= Arfaz Ayub =

Indian filmmaker

- Born: Thiruvananthapuram, Kerala, India
- Occupations: Film director; screenwriter; actor; assistant director

Arfaz Ayub is an Indian film director, screenwriter, actor, and former assistant director who works in Malayalam films. He made his directorial debut in 2024 with the psychological thriller Level Cross, which received critical acclaim from critics and audiences.

== Personal life ==
Arfaz Ayub was born and raised in Thiruvananthapuram, Kerala, India. Arfaz's father Adam Ayub is an actor and screenwriter who works in the Malayalam film and television industry. He is an alumnus of Mar Ivanios College, Thiruvananthapuram.

== Career ==
Arfaz Ayub assisted director Jeethu Joseph for several of his films including The Body (2019), Drishyam 2 (2021), Drushyam 2 (2021), 12th Man (2022), and Kooman (2022). In 2024, he made his directorial debut with the film Level Cross, presented by Joseph. The film was selected to be screened at the 55th International Film Festival of India in the Indian Panorama section. Whilst attending the 1st Guwahati Asian Film Festival in February 2025, Ayub announced that he was working on a Hindi feature film that would portray how a section of Northeast Indians migrate to Kerala and integrate into the workforce, often in the labour sector.

== Filmography ==
=== As director ===
Year	Title	Notes	Ref.
2013-2014	Bhoot Aaya	Television series	
2024	Level Cross	Also screenwriter; Directorial debut	

==== Assistant Director ====
Year	Title	Notes
2013	Horror Story	Associate Director
2019	Cabaret	Associate Director
2019	The Body	Associate Director
2020	Undekhi	Web Series; Associate Director
2020	Torbaaz	Associate Director
2021	Drishyam 2	Chief Associate Director
2021	Drushyam 2	Co-Director
2022	12th Man	Co-Director
2022	Kooman	Co-Director
2024	Aliya Basu Gayab Hai	Co-Director
2026	Valathu Vashathe Kallan	Chief Associate Director
2026	Drishyam 3	Chief Associate Director

==== Acting Credits ====
Year	Title	Role
2021	Drishyam 2	Forensic Assistant
2021	Drushyam 2	Forensic Assistant
2022	12th Man	Cashier Suresh
2022	Kooman	Joyce
2023	Neru	James
2024	Aliya Basu Gayab Hai	Delivery Boy
2026	Valathu Vashathe Kallan	Emmanuel
