= Ram (film) =

Upcoming Indian Malayalam action thriller film by Jeethu Joseph

- First look poster
- Directed by: Jeethu Joseph
- Written by: Jeethu Joseph
- Produced by: Ramesh P. Pillai; Sudhan Sundharam
- Starring: Mohanlal
- Cinematography: Satheesh Kurup
- Edited by: V. S. Vinayak
- Music by: Vishnu Shyam
- Production companies: Peacock Film Production; Abhishek Films; Passion Studios
- Country: India
- Language: Malayalam
- Budget: ₹140 crore

Ram is an upcoming Indian Malayalam-language action thriller film written and directed by Jeethu Joseph. It stars Mohanlal in the title role, with an ensemble cast. The film's music was composed by Vishnu Shyam.

Principal photography began in January 2020. The production has been delayed for over half a decade due to the COVID-19 pandemic. In April 2026, it was revealed by the director that the progress stalled due to financial cashflow and funding issues faced by producers. The long-delayed project officially resumed shooting in September 2026 across schedules in Ernakulam and Hyderabad, with Priyamani joining the cast.

== Premise ==
The film focuses on the efforts of RAW to track down a former operative, Ram Mohan, who went rogue and disappeared. The military needs his mental and physical abilities to deal with Bael, a terrorist group that possesses nuclear weapons capable of destroying an entire nation.

== Cast ==
- Mohanlal as Ram Mohan
- Trisha Krishnan
- Indrajith Sukumaran
- Priyamani
- Samyuktha
- Adil Hussain
- Durga Krishna as Meera
- Anoop Menon
- Saikumar
- Suman as Dhananjay
- Chandhunadh
- Vasishta N. Simha
- Siddique as Balakrishan
- Leona Lishoy as SP Aswathy
- Anjali Nair
- Santhi Mayadevi
- Priyanka Nair
- Anant Mahadevan
- Santhosh Keezhattoor
- Suresh Chandra Menon
- G. Suresh Kumar
- Shobi Thilakan
- Jayan Cherthala
- Sunil Sukhada
- Adam Ayub
- Hima Shankar
- Krishna

== Production ==
=== Development ===
Jeethu Joseph began working on the pre-production of Ram in early 2020 while simultaneously overseeing the post-production of The Body and Thambi. In November-December that year, it was reported that Mohanlal and Trisha would be starring in Jeethu's high-budget thriller film, which would be shot across various locations in India and overseas, with filming scheduled to begin in December-January and last for 60 days. It was jointly produced by the UK and Chennai-based Peacock film Production as main film making company and Abhishek Films and Passion Studios as joint venturist. However, the filming date was postponed to late December to coincide with the release of Thambi. Jeethu described the film as an action-thriller with a story spanning several countries. On 16 December, a pooja function and press meet were held for the film, during which its title was revealed. Jeethu shared that he was approached by the producers three years ago to make one film with Mohanlal after the success of Drishyam (2013). He further added, "I was tensed about doing another film with Lalettan [Mohanlal] because it's a huge responsibility. It took me three years to come up with the right subject".

The production of the film faced a delay during the COVID-19 pandemic in 2020. Utilizing the break, Jeethu expanded the film's scope, expanding it into a two-part film. As Jeethu explained, "we can't make a movie that is five hours long, and that's why it's been split into two parts. When I initially tried to compress everything into a single film, it turned out to be too long, and the editing process caused disruptions to the continuity of the film". He said that initially he had planned to limit Ram, a globetrotter, to a single film, "but following the success of Drishyam 2, the subsequent expansion of Lal sir's market, and the delay of the film for about two years, I felt it could be done on a bigger canvas", which the producers agreed to.

=== Casting ===
Mohanlal reportedly plays a R&AW agent in the film. During the casting process, Trisha was suggested for the role by Mohanlal. Trisha plays one of the lead roles in the film. She plays Vineetha, a doctor. Mohanlal also suggested Prachi Tehlan for a role, who was in talks in January 2020. Tehlan reportedly joined the film that month. Anoop Menon also joined in January. Chandhunadh plays Vivek, a journalist. Adil Hussain was cast in a brief but crucial role, while Indrajith Sukumaran was cast in a role with ample screen time. Suresh Chandra Menon was cast in the role of a villain.

Durga Krishna played the character of Meera in the first schedule of filming. Meera is sister to Vineetha. David John, who had contested in the Mohanlal-hosted reality TV show Bigg Boss was cast in a negative role, he was suggested by Mohanlal. Samyuktha Menon joined the film's shoot in September 2022 at London. Her character was created after the film was scaled-up after the schedule break due to the COVID-19 pandemic. Priyanka Nair also joined the shoot in London.

=== Filming ===
Initially, Ram was planned as a single film when the production began. Principal photography commenced on 6 January 2020, with the first phase of filming in India. Following this, the film was shot in Kerala . In February, the team completed the shoot in India. However, plans to shoot remaining portions in other countries were impeded by the COVID-19 pandemic. In May, Jeethu announced that filming would resume in the United Kingdom and Uzbekistan once the spread of the virus was under control. Meanwhile, he also decided to direct another film that could be shot entirely in his home state of Kerala. Post-production work for Ram began in UK, along with Drishyam 2 in India which he had completed by that time. The budget spent until then was approximately ₹94 crore, with additional ₹94 crore required to complete the film. The team contemplated moving the location to France due to prolonged restriction in the UK due to the COVID-19 pandemic, but decided to wait until the restrictions were lifted due to the higher cost. Jeethu said that Ram was his most expensive film to date.

During the pandemic break, Jeethu increased the scope of the film and expanded it into a two-part film, with both parts planning to be shot back-to-back. In the meantime, Jeethu directed three more films—Drishyam 2, 12th Man, and Kooman, between 2021 and 2022. In May 2022, Jeethu said that they are conducting location scouting in the Middle East and the UK that month. In July, the crew scouted in England and North Africa.

After a two-year seven months production delay, filming resumed the film. These portions featured Mohanlal, Indrajith, and Trisha. The filming schedule in London was deferred due to the death of Queen Elizabeth II on 8 September 2022, four days before production was set to begin. Filming eventually resumed that month. American stunt director Peter Pedrero choreographed the action sequence for the London shoot. The schedule was completed in October 2022. Following that, there was a 3-day shoot in Ernakulam. In the first week of December, the crew traveled to Morocco for the next phase of filming. The Moroccan schedule was wrapped on 23 December 2022.

The film has pending schedules in Tunisia, the UK, and Delhi. According to Jeethu, it may have a schedule in Israel too.

== Music ==
The soundtrack is composed by Vishnu Shyam. Ram marks his debut work as a music director, although his second film Kooman (also directed by Jeethu) was released ahead of it. The lyrics are written by Vinayak Sasikumar.

== Release ==
Before production began, Ram was originally planned for release during Onam 2020. However, due to the COVID-19 pandemic, filming was delayed. In May 2022, Jeethu revealed that they had to push the shooting dates to secure the desired locations.
