= 12th Man (film) =

2022 Indian mystery film by Jeethu Joseph

- Poster
- Directed by: Jeethu Joseph
- Written by: K. R. Krishna Kumar
- Story by: Sunir Khetarpal
- Produced by: Antony Perumbavoor
- Starring: Mohanlal
- Cinematography: Satheesh Kurup
- Edited by: V. S. Vinayak
- Music by: Anil Johnson
- Production company: Aashirvad Cinemas
- Distributed by: Disney+ Hotstar
- Release date: 20 May 2022
- Running time: 163 minutes
- Country: India
- Language: Malayalam

12th Man is a 2022 Indian Malayalam-language mystery thriller film directed by Jeethu Joseph and produced by Antony Perumbavoor under Aashirvad Cinemas, with a screenplay and story written by K. R. Krishna Kumar and Sunir Khetarpal. The film stars Mohanlal, with an ensemble cast consisting of Unni Mukundan,Saiju Kurup, Rahul Madhav, Anu Mohan, Chandhunadh, Anusree, Priyanka Nair, Anu Sithara, Sshivada, Aditi Ravi, and Leona Lishoy.

The soundtrack was composed by Anil Johnson. Principal photography took place from August to October 2021 lasting 48 days and post-production went up to March 2022. The film was shot extensively at a custom-built mansion in a hillside resort in Kulamavu, Idukki district, and the remaining portions were shot in Ernakulam. 12th Man was released directly on Disney+ Hotstar on 20 May 2022 and received mixed-to-positive reviews from critics.

== Plot ==
11 friends - Fida, Mathew and his wife Shiny, Sam and his wife Merin, Zachariah and his wife Annie, Siddharth and his fiancée Aarathy, and Jithesh and his wife Dr. Nayana - gather at a resort for the bachelor party of their friend, Siddharth. Out of the group, Annie, Fida, Jithesh, Mathew, Sam, Siddharth, and Zachariah are college classmates. They are interrupted by a seemingly annoying person, Chandrashekhar, who demands alcohol from them; they pacify and send him away.

During dinner, an argument happens between the friends when Fida claims that even though they are friends, there are always certain secrets kept within them that they would not even share with their spouses. To settle the argument, they decide to play a game wherein each one of them is to keep their phone on the table and read out loud the text messages they receive as well as place their phones on speaker, should they receive a call.

This leads to many embarrassing secrets being revealed. The main conflict happens when one of his friends calls Siddharth and asks him about the name of the abortion pills used by him when he made one of the group members pregnant. This leads to a brawl among them as he is unmarried, leading everyone to believe that he must have had an affair with one of their wives. As the night progresses, Shiny is revealed to have fallen to her death on the nearby view point.

An investigation is immediately opened, and the group discovers that Chandrashekhar is actually a DySP, who is on leave. He begins to question each one of them regarding their alibis and possible motives; he also plays the same game from earlier that night. It is revealed that Siddharth was not the one having an affair, but was merely covering up for Jithesh. When questioned, Jithesh claims that he was having an affair with Shiny, implying that she must have committed suicide to avoid the fear of being humiliated.

The fact that Shiny had bipolar disorder also contributes to his claims as Shiny's doctor confirms that bipolar people do have suicidal tendencies depending on their state, but to everyone's shock, Jithesh's claims are proven wrong as Dr. Nayana claims that it is impossible that Shiny fits into the abortion story as she cannot have children. Chandrashekar finds out that ₹10 lakh (US$10,000) was transferred to Shiny's account prior to her death, which is revealed from the calls from one of Mathew's moneylenders.

It is revealed that only ₹5 Lakhs had been transferred from Jithesh's account, meaning that the remaining ₹5 Lakhs must have been transferred from the account of the woman involved in the affair. Upon further investigation, it is revealed that Merin is the one who transferred the money and was with whom Jithesh was having an affair. Merin sought Shiny's help as Aarathy told Siddharth to bring both Jithesh and his lover to her in order to prove his innocence.

Shiny thus requested ₹5 Lakhs from both Jithesh and Merin. She then asks Annie to pretend to be Jithesh's lover in front of Aarathy instead of Merin, blackmailing her with a video Shiny recorded of Annie having an extramarital/illicit affair with a colleague, but Annie refuses. After extensive questioning, Chandrashekar deduces that since Sam and Merin have a joint account, Sam is confused as to why a large amount of money was transferred to Shiny. While confronting Shiny, in a fit of rage, Shiny reveals that it was to hide his wife's affair. An enraged Sam unintentionally pushes her to the edge, making her fall to her death. Chandrashekhar leaves the friends in the room as dawn breaks, leaving their fates unknown.

== Cast ==
- Mohanlal as DYSP Chandrashekhar
- Unni Mukundan as Zachariah, Annie's husband
- Saiju Kurup as Mathew, Shiny's husband
- Rahul Madhav as Sam, Merin's husband
- Anu Mohan as Siddharth, Aarathy's Fiancé
- Chandhunadh as Jithesh, Nayana's husband
- Anusree as Shiny, Mathew's wife
- Priyanka Nair as Annie, Zachariah's wife
- Anu Sithara as Merin, Sam's wife
- Sshivada as Dr. Nayana, Jithesh's wife
- Aditi Ravi as Aarathy, Sidharth's fiancee
- Leona Lishoy as Fida
- Siddique as Psychiatrist Dr. Harishankar
- Nandhu as Davis, resort manager
- Pradeep Chandran as Kumily Police Station CI Vipin Chandran
- Chali Pala as Chemmeen Jose
- Disney James as Kumily Police Station SI Biju Thomas
- Arfaz Ayub as Cashier Suresh
- Jomon as CPO Vijayan
- Javad Hussain as CPO Sunil

=== Voice cast ===
- Murali Gopy as DySP Sreekumar, Chandrasekhar's friend and colleague
- Mallika Sukumaran as Zachariah's mother
- Pradeep Kottayam as Sidharth's uncle
- Soubin Shahir as "Pwoli Sarath", Jithesh's friend
- Aju Varghese as Sajish, Sidharth's friend
- Irshad as John
- Jeethu Joseph as Merin's brother

== Production ==
=== Development ===
On 5 July 2021, sharing a title poster, Mohanlal announced 12th Man as his consecutive and forthcoming association with director Jeethu Joseph following the release of Drishyam 2 earlier that year. Antony Perumbavoor of Aashirvad Cinemas was announced to be producing the film. The announcement came amid the suspended production of Ram, their unfinished project, which was put on hold indefinitely due to the COVID-19 pandemic in India. The screenplay was written by K. R. Krishna Kumar. Describing the film, Jeethu told in an interview that the film tells the story of 12 people, with about 90 percent of the film set in a single location, He added that the suspense laid story happens within 24 hours and 12th Man can be made within the restrictions of the COVID-19 pandemic and would begin filming once the government lifts the pause on film productions.

Sunir Khetarpal, who produced Jeethu's The Body gave the story idea of 12th Man to Jeethu, hence the film's story right has been given to Khetarpal. Jeethu and Kumar discussed the story in from July 2021. It took 18 months for Kumar to complete the screenplay, which he described as a mystery thriller. Even though, they decided on making Kooman first, Jeethu narrated the story to Mohanlal and Antony on the sets of Drishyam 2. Jeethu received the final screenplay from Kumar during the filming of Drushyam 2, who conveyed it to Mohanlal and Antony, thus the project was green-lit. 12th Man was planned to go on floors after the completion of Mohanlal's Barroz and Ram. However, following the surge of the second wave of COVID-19 in India, Kooman has placed on hold as it required multiple location shoots, which was difficult with the COVID-19 restrictions in effect, hence they decided to go ahead with 12th Man which only required two locations.

=== Casting ===
There are a total of 14 characters in the film. The final principal cast include Mohanlal, Unni Mukundan, Saiju Kurup, Rahul Madhav, Anu Sithara, Leona Lishoy, Anu Mohan, Anusree, Chandunadh, Aditi Ravi, Sshivada, and Priyanka Nair. Mukundan read the screenplay while he was filming for Bro Daddy. Shine Tom Chacko, Veena Nandakumar, and Santhi Priya were part of the initial cast but opted out. Jeethu said that the challenge was to synchronise everyone's dates as everyone were already committed to other projects which were at various stages of production. Sshivada recalled in an interview that she was invited to the film by Jeethu asking that if she was interested in doing a "small OTT film" produced by Aashirvad Cinemas and starring Mohanlal.

=== Filming ===
Principal photography began on 17 August 2021 coinciding with the Kerala New Year on the first day of the Malayalam month Chingam. It commenced with a customary pooja ceremony in Ernakulam. Shooting then took place at GreenBerg Holiday Resorts in Kulamavu, Idukki district. Mohanlal joined the set on 15 September. The entire resort was booked for the shoot. Idukki was the primary location of the film. Filming was completed on 3 October after 48 days of shooting. Satheesh Kurup was the film's cinematographer. Shooting of the film was delayed by five days due to rain and mist. It was the first instance in Jeethu's career that filming went beyond the scheduled dates.

Jeethu said "12th Man requires quite a bit of post-production work". In November 2021, Jeethu said that the post-production was going on which he expects to complete by January or February next year. Post-production was completed by late March 2022.

== Music ==
The original background score was composed, arranged, and produced by Anil Johnson. The title song "Find" in English was sung by Souparnika Rajagopal. The Times of India wrote that "the song indeed has some mysterious vibes which are very reminiscent of James Bond Theme songs".

== Themes & Influences ==
The core idea of the story is loosely inspired by the 2016 Italian film Perfect Strangers and the screenplay keeps a mystery that is mainly influenced by Agatha Christie's crime novels.

== Release ==
=== Streaming ===
12th Man was released on the eve of Mohanlal's birthday in 2022 on the streaming platform Disney+ Hotstar.

=== Marketing ===
Prior to release, Jeethu promoted the film on the Mohanlal hosted TV show Bigg Boss (season 4). Disney+ Hotstar also conducted a game to find out the killer based on clues.

== Reception ==
The film received positive reviews from critics and audiences.

The Times of India gave the film 4 out of 5 stars and wrote "An Entertaining, Delicious Whodunnit. 12th Man is definitely worth a watch and is sure to appeal to more than the Malayali audience."
