= Level Cross (film) =

2024 Indian film

- Theatrical release poster
- Directed by: Arfaz Ayub
- Screenplay by: Arfaz Ayub
- Dialogues by: Adam Ayub
- Produced by: Ramesh P. Pillai; Jeethu Joseph (presenter)
- Starring: Asif Ali; Amala Paul; Sharaf U Dheen
- Cinematography: Appu Prabhakar
- Edited by: Deepu Joseph
- Music by: Vishal Chandrashekhar
- Production company: Abhishek Films
- Distributed by: Wayfarer Films; Phars Film (overseas); Yash Raj Films (UK/Europe)
- Release date: 26 July 2024
- Running time: 116 minutes
- Country: India
- Language: Malayalam

Level Cross is a 2024 Indian Malayalam-language psychological drama film written and directed by Arfaz Ayub (in his directorial debut). It stars Asif Ali, Amala Paul, and Sharaf U Dheen. The music was composed by Vishal Chandrashekhar.

The film was shot in Tunisia. Level Cross was released theatrically on 26 July 2024.

== Plot ==
In a desert, a disheveled man works as the gatekeeper of a level crossing, living alone in a remote dwelling. One day, he finds an unconscious woman and takes her to his home. When she regains consciousness, she explains that she fell off a train. Feeling unsafe, she leaves but collapses while walking toward the horizon.

The man tends to her and introduces himself as Raghu. With no other option, she stays the night. The next morning, when Raghu offers to contact the railway authorities, she stops him. Introducing herself as Chaithali, a psychiatrist, she begins to recount her troubled past and her marriage to a man named Zincho.

Chaithali explains that Zincho had sought therapy after his first wife's suicide. They fell in love and married, but she later discovered that Zincho struggled with substance abuse and became abusive. He was admitted to a mental asylum. He killed the matron to escape and later caught Chaithali reading his diary, which revealed he had killed his first wife. Fleeing together, Chaithali jumped off the train.

Raghu shares his own story. He grew up with his mother, who had wished for him to marry. He never took it seriously, and after her death, he lived in regret and isolation. Raghu believes fate brought Chaithali to him. Chaithali begins to trust him, and Raghu finds happiness in her companionship.

While Chaithali cleans the house during Raghu's absence, she finds his identity card with a different man's photo, alongside newspaper clippings about a murder involving a family of four. When Raghu returns, he notices her frightened demeanor and tries to console her but discovers the identity card she inadvertently left behind. She holds a knife at him. He disarms her and shares more about his past.

Raghu tells her that he had a girlfriend from childhood who dumped him for a wealthy suitor. Fulfilling his mother's wish, he entered into an arranged marriage. His wife invited her cousin to stay with them. Their marriage consummated with two children. Two years later, during a hospital visit for a vasectomy, Raghu discovered he had been infertile. Upon returning home, he found his wife in bed with the man pretending to be her cousin. Enraged, Raghu killed them and their children. He suspected his wife had also killed his mother to make way for her affair. He fled and assumed the identity of another man—the original Raghu—who had offered him refuge before dying.

As they share their pasts, their mutual sense of isolation draws them closer, and Chaithali decides to live with him. Raghu sends her to fetch water from an abandoned village whose inhabitants, according to legend, fled in fear of a creature that walked upside down.

While Chaithali is away, Raghu senses someone lurking outside. It is Zincho, who asks if Raghu has seen anyone in need of help. Sensing danger, Raghu lies. A fight ensues and Zincho overpowers Raghu. Zincho explains that he is a psychiatrist, and Chaithali, whom he calls Shikha, was his patient. They had fallen in love, but she was a drug addict who lost her sanity and killed the asylum's matron, adopting her name. Zincho warns Raghu that Shikha is a dangerous psychopath and that his life is at risk.

Raghu confronts Chaithali. She claims Shikha was Zincho's first wife. Unable to convince him, she surrenders to her husband. As they walk away, Raghu pleads with Zincho to let her stay. While Zincho is distracted, Chaithali strikes him, causing him to collapse, seemingly dead. When Zincho stirs, Raghu bludgeons him to death, assuring Chaithali of his trust.

Raghu discovers a medical bill in Zincho's pocket, confirming that he was indeed a psychiatrist and that Shikha was his patient. Before Raghu can react, Shikha strikes him with a shovel. The next scene shows Raghu, now revealed as George, prepared for another day as a gatekeeper. Shikha is presumably dead. A final flashback reveals that George fabricated his backstory—he was never married and had actually killed the family of his ex-girlfriend.

In the closing scene, something watches George's house from an inverted perspective, accompanied by a low growl—presumably the creature that once terrorized the villagers.

== Cast ==
- Asif Ali as Raghu / George
- Amala Paul as Chaithali / Shikha
- Sharaf U Dheen as Dr. Zincho Phillip
- Dyna Suresh as Raghu's wife
- Lal Jose as Urologist
- Indrans (photo appearance)

== Production ==
=== Development ===
The untitled film was officially announced in March 2023. The film marks the feature film directorial debut of Arfaz Ayub, a former associate of filmmaker Jeethu Joseph, who is also credited as the film's presenter. Ayub's father Adam Ayub wrote the dialogues, based on his screenplay. The film was produced by Ramesh R. Pillai of Abhishek Films. The film's title was announced in January 2024, with a motion poster. Ayub described the film as a drama centred around three characters. The story takes place in the Sahara desert, even though the place and time remains undefined.

Ayub had previously worked with Asif Ali in Kooman. He envisaged Amala Paul as Chaithali during the scripting process. It took several months to reach Amala, who was eventually contacted with the assistance of Jeethu. Among the three main cast members, Sharaf U Dheen was the last to be cast.

=== Filming ===
Initially, Ayub planned to film in Rajasthan but changed his plans after visiting Morocco for the shoot of Ram. However, due to the high costs of filming in Morocco, he chose Tunisia as the new location. According to Ayub, during the initial location scouting, they traveled eight hours from the Tunisian capital, Tunis, to reach Tozeur and then walked another two hours to their shooting location. They constructed a makeshift road from the highway to facilitate transportation.

Principal photography began on 28 March 2023 in Tunisia. It was held in the Tunisian desert, close to the Sahara. After 21 days shoot, principal photography was wrapped on 18 April 2023. A few scenes were also shot in Kerala, India.

== Music ==
The music was composed by Vishal Chandrashekhar. Amala Paul made her debut as a playback singer with the song "Ente Pinnile Roopam". The soundtrack was distributed by Think Music. Prachi Tehlan also featured in the music video of "Donkey Song".

All lyrics are written by Vinayak Sasikumar.

Track listing
No.	Title	Singer(s)	Length
1.	"Ente Pinnile Roopam"	Amala Paul	2:29
2.	"Donkey Song"	Anthony Daasan	3:18
3.	"Payye Payye"	Devu Mathew	2:37
4.	"Ente Pinnile Roopam (Film version)"	Shakthisree Gopalan	2:29
Total length:			10:53

== Release ==
Level Cross was released theatrically on 26 July 2024.

== Reception ==
Rohit Panikker of Times Now gave it 4 out of 5 stars and wrote, "Level Cross is an exciting and interesting experiment in story-telling, and a psychological thriller that definitely offers a different experience in the theatre." Sanjith Sidhardhan of OTTplay gave it 3.5 out of 5 stars and wrote, "If you are a fan of slow-burn, psychological thrillers, then Arfaz Ayub's confident debut makes for a good watch."

Anjana George of The Times of India gave it three out of five stars and wrote, "it is a film that rewards viewers who appreciate intricate narratives and symbolic storytelling. Its artistic approach makes it a promising debut, though its unconventional style might not appeal to all audiences." Vivek Santhosh of The New Indian Express rated the film two-and-a-half out of five stars and wrote that "What ultimately makes this psychological thriller both interesting and defeating is that no one is quite what they seem."
