= Lakshyam (2017 film) =

- Theatrical release poster
- Directed by: Anzar Khan
- Written by: Jeethu Joseph
- Based on: Mukhamukham by Anzar Khan
- Produced by: Teji Manalel; Jeethu Joseph; Joy Thomas Sakthikulangara
- Starring: Biju Menon; Indrajith Sukumaran; Sshivada
- Cinematography: Sinu Sidharth
- Edited by: Ayoob Khan
- Music by: M. Jayachandran; Anil Johnson
- Production companies: JT Films; Vintage Films
- Distributed by: Kalasangham Films
- Release date: 6 May 2017 (India)
- Country: India
- Language: Malayalam

Lakshyam (transl. Target) is a 2017 Indian Malayalam-language adventure thriller film directed by Anzar Khan (in his feature debut), and written and co-produced by Jeethu Joseph. It is based on the short film Mukhamukham directed by Anzar Khan. The film stars Biju Menon and Indrajith Sukumaran in the lead roles. The soundtrack was composed by Anil Johnson.

== Plot ==
Both Mustafa (Biju Menon) and Vimal (Indrajith Sukumaran) are convicts who escaped during transport from Peermade to Ernakulam. Musthafa and Vimal are handcuffed together. Musthafa is a petty thief convicted of stealing a watch from a mall while Vimal is arrested for a murder he did not commit. Vimal asks Musthafa to help him to find the real killer whom he suspects, in exchange for ₹3 lakhs. They move through the forest and encounter wild creatures.

Vimal tells Musthafa his story. Vimal is rich. He and Shalini (Sshivada), who is hearing-impaired, fall in love with each other and get engaged with each other. One rainy night, after reaching her Aunt's home, Shalini calls Vimal for help because somebody enters the house. Even though Vimal reaches the house, he is unable to save Shalini from falling from the terrace. Shalini dies and Vimal is framed for her murder. The only mark on the real murderer is that Shalini stabbed the real killer.

Then it is revealed that it was actually Musthafa who is the real killer. Musthafa stole the watch and put it into Shalini's bag at the Shopping mall as police find him. At night Musthafa goes to take the watch from her house but Shalini sees him and thinks that he is a rapist and accidentally falls from the terrace. Finally, Vimal knows that it was Mustafa who was responsible for Shalini's death. Mustafa admits that it was an accident and saves Vimal from police by admitting his role and goes to jail.

He is sentenced for five years. The film ends with Mustafa receiving a cheque for ₹10 lakhs from Vimal (who is shown to be in Dubai) for keeping his word and starting a new life after release from jail.

== Cast ==
- Biju Menon as Mustafa
- Indrajith Sukumaran as Vimal Kumar
- Sshivada as Shalini
- Kishor Satya as Alexander Mathew
- Shammi Thilakan as Ravi
- Sudhi Koppa as Lock Lalu
- Balaji Sarma
- Nandu Poduval as Advocate Rajeevan
- Koottickal Jayachandran as Sunny Eapen
- Disney James as Constable D. James
- Lishoy as Police Officer

== Production ==
Lakshyam is the feature film debut of Anzar Khan, who had earlier worked as an associate director under Viji Thampi and directed shorts and telefilms. The film's costume designer was Jeethu's wife Linta Jeethu. The screenplay was written by director Jeethu Joseph and it was the first time Jeethu was writing a script for another director. The story is based on the short film Mukhamukham directed by Anzar Khan. Principal photography began in November 2016.
