= Dridam =

- Theatrical release poster
- Directed by: Martin Joseph
- Written by: Jomon John; Linto Devasia
- Produced by: Mukesh R. Mehta; C.V. Sarathi
- Starring: Shane Nigam
- Cinematography: P. M. Unnikrishnan
- Edited by: V. S. Vinayak
- Music by: Sreerag Saji
- Production companies: E4 Entertainment; Bedtime Stories
- Release date: 8 May 2026
- Running time: 128 minutes
- Country: India
- Language: Malayalam

Dridam (transl. Strong) is a 2026 Indian Malayalam-language crime thriller film directed by Martin Joseph (in his directorial debut) and produced by Mukesh R. Mehta and C. V. Sarathi under the banner E4 Entertainment. Presented by Jeethu Joseph, the film stars Shane Nigam in the lead role, with Shobi Thilakan, Krishna Praba, Dinesh Prabhakar, Abhiram Radhakrishnan and Kottayam Ramesh in supporting roles. Dridam was theatrically released on 8 May 2026.

== Plot ==
Vijay Radhakrishnan, a newly appointed Sub-Inspector, is posted to the Kuzhinilam Police Station in Idukki district. Shortly after his arrival, a severed human hand is discovered in a plantation, leading police to a mutilated corpse whose identity remains unknown. Around the same time, the station investigates a robbery at Aanamala Finance, a lending company unpopular among local residents due to its predatory practices.

The investigation becomes more complex when a second body is recovered from a nearby dam. Forensic examination indicates that both victims were killed in a similar manner, suggesting a connection between the murders. Later, acting on information received from a local source, Vijay and his team discover a third body buried in a plantation. The victim is found holding a gold ornament that is identified as property stolen during the Aanamala Finance robbery.

Police identify the deceased as a migrant labourer from Tamil Nadu and learn that he had been working with three other labourers who disappeared after the robbery. Investigators initially conclude that the four labourers committed the theft and that internal disputes over the stolen gold led to a series of killings, leaving one survivor who escaped with the loot. Vijay begins searching for the presumed remaining suspect.

The case takes a new direction when a goldsmith reports that a woman attempted to sell a necklace linked to the stolen gold. Vijay traces the woman and discovers that she had recently purchased medication commonly prescribed to stroke patients. Further inquiries reveal a connection between the woman and the bedridden mother of a police officer at Vijay's station. Vijay's suspicions are strengthened when he learns that the officer's wife uses the same distinctive ringtone that had been heard on the woman's phone.

Vijay subsequently uncovers evidence implicating members of his own police team. The officers had accidentally killed one of the migrant labourers during an unofficial interrogation. To conceal their involvement, they orchestrated a cover-up, framing the labourers for the Aanamala Finance robbery, stealing the gold for themselves, and murdering the remaining labourers to eliminate witnesses.

When confronted, the officers admit their actions and attempt to persuade Vijay to remain silent and share in the stolen wealth. Vijay refuses and a violent confrontation follows. After defeating the corrupt officers, he ensures their arrest and recovers the stolen gold. The conspiracy is exposed, and justice is delivered for the murdered labourers.

== Cast ==
- Shane Nigam as SI Vijay Radhakrishnan
- Shobi Thilakan as ASI Krishnan Kurup, a corrupt cop and a member of the antagonist gang
- Dinesh Prabhakar as CPO Sathyan, a corrupt cop
- Krishna Praba as CPO Remya Surendran
- Nandan Unni as CPO Anand, a corrupt cop
- Kottayam Ramesh as SCPO Balan Nair
- Saniya Fathima as CPO Vidya Jayachandran, a corrupt cop
- Sreedhanya as Deepa,Vijay's mother
- Amal Rajdev as Vijay's father
- Abhiram Radhakrishnan as Manoj
- Mathew Varghese as DYSP Alex Jacob
- Joji K. John as Shaji
- Vinod Bose as CPO Bibish
- Prasant Murali as Saneesh
- Bitto Davis as Sabu
- Abhishek Raveendran as Aanamala finance manager
- Sreejith Gangadharan
- Adam Ayub as Forensic Surgeon
- Renji Panicker as retired DySP Rajeev Kumar (voice appearance)

== Release ==
=== Theatrical ===
Dridam was released in theatres on 8 May 2026.

=== Home media ===
The film began streaming on Disney+ Hotstar from 12 June 2026.

== Reception ==
Goutham S of Pinkvilla gave 2 out of 5 stars, writing that "Despite its shortcomings, Dridam has enough going for it to keep an average viewer mildly engaged. However, the freshness and originality a mystery thriller requires to fully captivate its audience are largely missing, which affects the overall experience even on OTT platforms". S. R. Praveen of The Hindu wrote that "Despite initial promise, ‘Dridam’ falters under the weight of clichéd storytelling and excessive violence, failing to deliver the suspense and depth expected from the genre". Anandu Suresh of The Indian Express gave 1.5 out of 5 stars, writing "Considering that the Shane Nigam-starrer often attempts to be a police procedural, there is an abundance of dialogues, and most of it sounds soulless and uninspired". Sajin Shrijith of The Week gave 3.5 out of 5 stars, writing "For a change, it's refreshing to see a police hero who doesn't have any vices or doesn't suffer from a triggering trauma from a past tragedy. Shane Nigam's new film creates this impressive smoke-and-mirrors effect that enhances the impact of the finale".
