= Drishyam =

2013 Indian film by Jeethu Joseph

- Theatrical release poster
- Directed by: Jeethu Joseph
- Written by: Jeethu Joseph
- Produced by: Antony Perumbavoor
- Starring: Mohanlal
- Cinematography: Sujith Vaassudev
- Edited by: Ayoob Khan
- Music by: Songs: Vinu Thomas; Anil Johnson; Score: Anil Johnson
- Production company: Aashirvad Cinemas
- Distributed by: Maxlab Cinemas and Entertainments
- Release date: 19 December 2013 (India)
- Running time: 164 minutes
- Country: India
- Language: Malayalam
- Budget: ₹3.5–5 crore (Note: Gautaman Bhaskaran of Hindustan Times claims the film's budget as ₹ 3.5 crore Sify claims the budget of the film to be ₹4.5 crore and IANS claims it to be ₹5 crore)
- Box office: ₹62 crore

Drishyam (transl. Visual) is a 2013 Indian Malayalam-language crime thriller film written and directed by Jeethu Joseph. It stars Mohanlal alongside Meena, Ansiba Hassan, Esther Anil, Kalabhavan Shajohn, Asha Sharath, Siddique, Roshan Basheer and Neeraj Madhav. The film was produced by Antony Perumbavoor under Aashirvad Cinemas. It is the first installment in the Drishyam film series. The film follows the struggle of Georgekutty and his family, who come under suspicion when Varun Prabhakar, the son of the IG Geetha Prabhakar, goes missing.

Principal photography commenced in October 2013 in Thodupuzha, where the film was extensively shot. The cinematography was handled by Sujith Vaassudev whilst the film was edited by Ayoob Khan. The soundtrack was composed by Anil Johnson and Vinu Thomas.

Drishyam was released on 19 December 2013. The film received widespread critical acclaim with critics praising the cast performance, story, screenplay, and direction. It was the first Malayalam film to collect ₹50 crore. The film grossed over ₹62 crore worldwide. It ran in theatres for more than 150 days. It also became the longest-running film in the United Arab Emirates, running for 125 days. The film remained the highest-grossing Malayalam film of all time until it was surpassed by Premam in 2015 and remained among the top 10 highest-grossing Malayalam films of all time for a decade. A sequel titled Drishyam 2 was released in 2021.

Drishyam won numerous accolades, including the Kerala State Film Award for Best Film with Popular Appeal and Aesthetic Value and the Filmfare Award for Best Film – Malayalam. The film was also screened at the 45th International Film Festival of India and the 8th Asian Film Festival. Drishyam has been remade into several languages including four regional languages which were Drishya (2014) in Kannada, Drushyam (2014) in Telugu, Papanasam (2015) in Tamil and Drishyam (2015) in Hindi. Internationally, it was remade in Sinhala language as Dharmayuddhaya (2017) and in Chinese as Sheep Without a Shepherd (2019). A Korean remake was announced, making it the first Indian film to be remade in that language. The Indonesian remake was announced in September 2021 and released in 2026 as Ayah, Aku Mau Cerita..., making it the first Indian film to be remade in Indonesian. An English language remake has been announced by Panorama Studios in 2024 with U.S. companies Gulfstream Pictures and JOAT Films. The Spanish remake was announced at the 2026 International Film Festival of Delhi.

== Plot ==
Georgekutty is an orphan and a fourth-grade dropout who operates a successful cable television service in the rural village of Rajakkad. He lives with his wife, Rani, and their two daughters, Anju and Anu. Aside from his dedication to farming, Georgekutty's primary obsession is watching films, a pastime that occupies most of his working hours in his office.

The family's peaceful life is disrupted when Anju attends a school nature camp, where she is secretly recorded in the bathroom via a hidden smartphone by Varun Prabhakar, the spoiled son of Inspector General of Police Geetha and Prabhakar. Varun later corners Anju and uses the footage to blackmail her, demanding she meet him outside her home late at night. When Varun arrives, Rani intervenes and desperately begs him to leave her daughter alone. Varun agrees only on the condition that Rani submit to his sexual demands instead. In a frantic attempt to defend her mother, Anju strikes Varun's head with a rod, accidentally killing him. Rani and Anju bury his body in a nearby compost pit while Anu witnesses. Upon returning home, Georgekutty learns of the tragedy and immediately devises a meticulously calculated plan to protect his family from criminal prosecution. He destroys Varun's phone and disposes of his car, though the vehicle transfer is noted by Sahadevan, a corrupt local police constable who harbors a personal grudge against Georgekutty.

Anticipating a rigorous police inquiry once Varun is reported missing, Georgekutty takes his family on an apparent weekend trip to the city of Thodupuzha to attend a religious retreat, watch a movie, and dine at a restaurant. Geetha spearheads the missing person investigation, and suspicion eventually falls on Georgekutty's family. When summoned for questioning, the family members maintain an identical, unwavering alibi. Georgekutty produces restaurant bills, movie tickets, and bus receipts to substantiate their timeline. Furthermore, when Geetha interrogates the business owners from Thodupuzha, they all corroborate the family's presence on the alleged dates. However, Geetha eventually uncovers Georgekutty’s manipulation: he had actually traveled alone on the day after the murder to collect the tickets and forge relationships with the local merchants, only bringing his family on the identical trip a day later. By doing so, he trickily conditioned the witnesses' memories to inadvertently validate a false timeline.

Unable to break the alibi through standard procedures, Geetha authorizes the unauthorized detention of the family. Sahadevan subjects them to brutal physical torture, eventually targeting young Anu. Terrified, Anu relents and points the investigators to the backyard compost pit. However, when the police excavate the site before a gathering crowd of locals and media personnel, they unearth the carcass of a cow rather than Varun's remains, revealing that Georgekutty anticipated the betrayal and relocated the body. Seizing the momentum, Georgekutty exposes the police brutality to the public. The outraged villagers, led by Rani's brother Rajesh, riot against the police and subdue Sahadevan. The public backlash results in Sahadevan's suspension and Geetha's resignation.

Sometime later, a grieving Geetha and Prabhakar privately confront Georgekutty. They apologize for their son’s predatory behavior and plead for closure regarding his fate. While expressing profound sympathy, Georgekutty subtly confesses to the shielding of his family without explicitly admitting to the homicide or revealing the burial site.

The film concludes at the newly constructed Rajakkad police station, where Georgekutty, currently out on bail, signs the daily attendance register. The new station inspector vows to eventually uncover the truth and locate the body, to which Georgekutty calmly replies that he maintains faith in the protective nature of the law. As he walks away from the compound, a flashback reveals that Georgekutty had permanently concealed Varun's corpse within the foundational cement of the police station's interrogation room floor during its construction.

== Cast ==
- Mohanlal as Georgekutty, a cable TV operator
- Meena as Rani George, Georgekutty's wife
- Ansiba Hassan as Anju George, Georgekutty and Rani's elder daughter
- Esther Anil as Anu George, Georgekutty and Rani's younger daughter
- Asha Sharath as IG Geetha Prabhakar IPS
- Siddique as Prabhakar, Geetha's husband
- Roshan Basheer as Varun Prabhakar, Geetha and Prabhakar's son
- Kalabhavan Shajohn as Constable Sahadevan
- Irshad as SI Suresh Babu
- Kunchan as Head Constable Madhavan Nair
- Neeraj Madhav as Monichan
- Kozhikode Narayanan Nair as Sulaiman, a tea shop owner
- Aneesh G. Menon as Rajesh, Rani's brother
- P. Sreekumar as Rani's father
- Shobha Mohan as Rani's mother
- Koottickal Jayachandran as Murali, a bus conductor
- Kalabhavan Haneef as theatre operator
- Kalabhavan Rahman as bus conductor
- Balaji Sarma as restaurant owner
- Sony Solomon as lodge owner
- Baiju V. K. as Soman
- Pradeep Chandran as new Sub Inspector of Police
- Antony Perumbavoor as Antony, a police officer
- Mela Raghu as Raghu
- Nisha Sarang as school principal
- Arun S. Panackal as Alex, Varun's friend

== Production ==
=== Development ===
In July 2013, it was reported that Jeethu Joseph will be directing a film titled My Family with Mohanlal in the lead. In August 2013, Jeethu clarified that the film was titled Drishyam. A thread similar to that of Drishyam has been with the director since the early 1990s. He was inspired by a conversation he had overheard about the plight of two families involved in a legal battle. Jeethu had penned the story of Drishyam even before Memories (2013). He says, "I started working on the subject some two years back. But I wanted to stick to the planned order and hence postponed the project till I finished Memories". The script was initially planned to be filmed by another director but since that director could not find a producer, Jeethu took back the script and decided to direct it himself. Drishyam contrasts from the director's previous films. He says, "Different films require different treatment. I toiled hard while filming Memories as the film was full of twists and turns and the handling of the subject mattered a lot. But Drishyam is a complete script-oriented film that does not require any special effort. We shot the film sticking completely to the script, and the shooting was completed effortlessly."

=== Casting ===
Jeethu had initially approached Mammootty to play the lead, but he was unable to commit and asked Jeethu to proceed with the film with another actor. According to the director, Mammootty was instrumental in casting actress Meena for the film. The director, in an interview with The New Indian Express, stated that he wrote the screenplay with Mohanlal in mind and that the character was tailor-made for Mohanlal. He later added that no changes were made in the script when Mohanlal agreed.

Kalabhavan Shajohn, who previously worked in the industry as a comedian and the sidekick of the lead actors, was chosen for the main antagonistic role. The director stated, "I had two-three actors in mind, but at last decided to pick Shajon. I was very clear that I did not want anyone who has played negative characters so far to do the role. Shajon was a total revelation." Roshan Basheer, who debuted through Plus Two (2010), was chosen after conducting a screen test. Asha Sarath was later signed for the role of a police officer. Child actors Ansiba Hassan and Esther Anil, along with Siddique, Irshad, Kunchan and Koottickal Jayachandran were also cast to play major supporting roles.

=== Filming ===
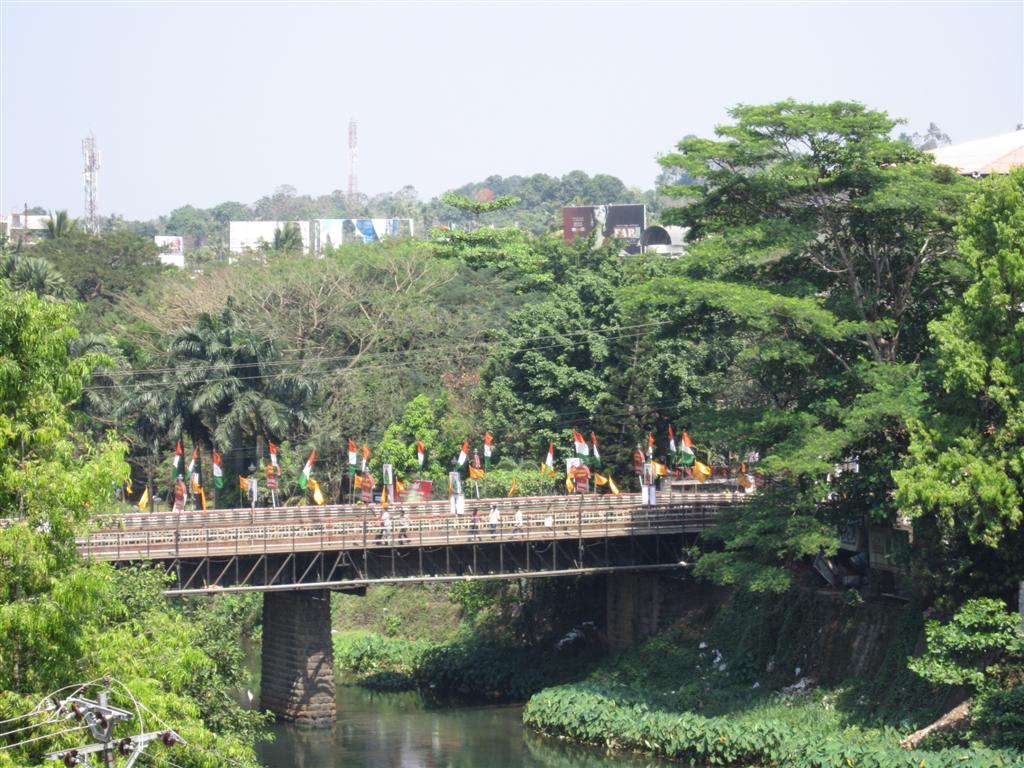
Film was shot in Thodupuzha

Drishyam commenced principal photography in the first week of October 2013. Mohanlal joined the sets only from 10 October. The film was shot at Thodupuzha in Kerala. The road-side house shown in the film, which was a major location, is situated at Vazhithala, near Thodupuzha. The shooting had to be halted for a while as Meena fainted on the location. Drishyam was initially planned to be filmed in 52 days, though it was completed in 44 days.

== Themes ==
A reviewer from The Hindu noted, "The film takes off as a typical family drama. The first half of the film is intentionally slow-paced and shows to the audience the lighter moments in the family of Georgekutty. This half combines the elements of drama and comedy genres. The audience gets completely absorbed in the twist of events that begin to unfold from the end of the first half. The second half is more like a thriller and is about how the family, despite the vengeful villainy of a corrupt cop, stands its ground even as the law takes its course." When asked whether this change in narrative style post-interval was intentional, Jeethu replied: "I really don't understand when people say the first half lacked pace. A story or a film has its own way of progression and it does travel in a zig-zag way, capturing all the ups and downs of our lives. Right from the start if you accelerate the pace, sooner or later, the story-telling will lose its steam."

When asked whether he had kicked off a new genre in Malayalam—family thriller, a genre which combines the elements of a family drama and thriller, Jeethu replied, "I still believe it belongs to the genre 'drama', not a thriller." He also stated in another interview, "We usually brand a film as a thriller, simply because there is some mystery in the narrative or the story unfolds through an investigation. But I don't subscribe to this. Although there are some twists in the tale and some suspense as well, Drishyam is essentially the story of a family."

The film has also been said to be inspired by The Devotion of Suspect X, a Japanese novel written by Keigo Higashino. Ekta Kapoor, who had purchased the Hindi movie rights of the novel, sent a legal notice to the makers of the film. However, the director clarified, "After Ekta's legal team sent us the letter, I watched the Japanese film, Suspect X, which is an adaptation of the Japanese novel. There could be similarities between my film and that Japanese film, but my film is neither an adaptation nor a copy. The Japanese film is also about a murder cover-up and hence the allegation. Similarities are quite common in the works of creators and that shouldn't be made into an issue." Rashomon (1950) was also cited as an inspiration for the film.

The film was criticised for the use of some "sexist dialogues" in the first half which were playing to a certain "new generation" audience. Sowmya Rajendran of Sify criticised the same and stated about one of such scenes in the film, "it is such banter, which we often dismiss with a laugh, that helps perpetuate rape culture." When asked about this, the director replied, "I firmly believe such conversations are part of our lives. I don't want to elaborate, but it also throws an insight into each character featured in the sequences. Yes, frankly, I was a bit worried how the family audience would react to those scenes. But then I read out that part of the script to a select group of women and they nodded their heads in approval."

There were also allegations that Drishyam might provoke murder. Kerala ADGP T. P. Senkumar IPS claimed that two people accused of murdering a woman from Nilambur in February 2014 admitted that their methods for disposing of the victim's body and mobile phone SIM card were influenced by the film. The murder of a young girl in Irinjalakuda by her father and his mistress was also said to be influenced by Drishyam.

== Music ==
Drishyam

Soundtrack album by Anil Johnson, Vinu Thomas
- Released: 25 November 2013
- Recorded: 2013
- Studios: Sound Factory, Cochin
- Genre: Feature film soundtrack
- Length: 10:20
- Language: Malayalam
- Label: Muzik 247

Drishyam's soundtrack album features two songs used in the film, each of them were composed by Anil Johnson and Vinu Thomas, with lyrics penned by Santhosh Varma; the former provided the background score for the film. The album was released on 25 November 2013 by Muzik 247.

Veeyen of NowRunning noted in his review of the film that the songs "have a refreshingly delightful tenor to them that deserve an applause for certain." The reviewer of IndiaGlitz called the score "refreshing" and stated that it "builds the tempo" for the film.

Track list
No.	Title	Music	Singer(s)	Length
1.	"Maarivil"	Vinu Thomas	Najim Arshad	04:13
2.	"Nizhale"	Anil Johnson	Vijay Yesudas	06:07
Total length:				10:20

== Release ==
=== Theatrical ===
Drishyam released on 19 December 2013 in India. It also received a theatrical release in the United States, United Kingdom and the United Arab Emirates on 3 January 2014. The film was selected to be screened in the Indian Panorama at the 45th International Film Festival of India. It also screened at the 8th Asian Film Festival held in Jeddah in 2015, representing India.

=== Home media ===
Drishyam was released on Blu-ray Disc, DVD and VCD on 9 May 2014. The film created a new record in the DVD and VCD sales on the first day of release itself.

=== Plagiarism allegations ===
In August 2014, film director Satheesh Paul filed a copyright infringement suit against the makers, saying that it had similarities to his script titled Oru Mazhakkalathu, written in 2013. The court passed an order saying that the movie had prima facie similarities to Satheesh' script, but allowed the making of the Tamil version Papanasam to proceed, on the condition that the makers of Drishyam produce a ₹10 lakh bank guarantee before the court to ensure the compensation. The case was dismissed in March 2015 as it was proved that Jeethu had written the script in 2011.

== Reception ==
=== Critical response ===
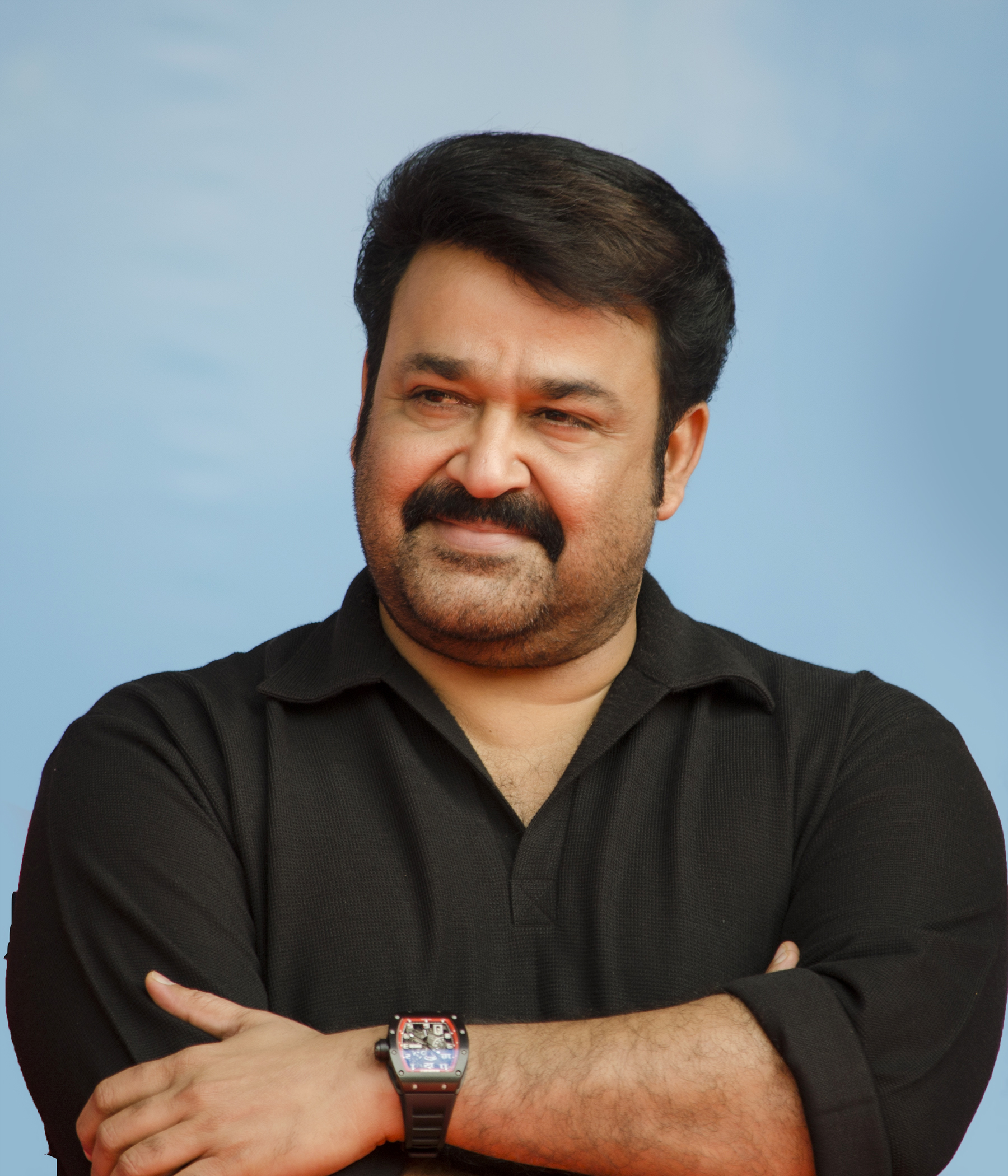
Mohanlal attracted positive reviews for his performance.

Drishyam received widespread critical acclaim from critics. On the review aggregator website Rotten Tomatoes, 95% of 6 critics' reviews are positive, with an average rating of 8.4/10.

Sify's reviewer rated the film as "Excellent" and stated, "It is not often that you sit in a theatre with bated breath, never wanting to miss a moment of the film on screen. Writer director Jeethu Joseph's Drishyam is one such film, a gripping tale that leaves you spellbound with its skillful craft."

Veeyen of NowRunning rated the film 3/5 and commented, "In Drishyam Jeethu attempts a stunning mix of the real with the imaginary, and the result is an unpredictable cinematic artichoke that takes you by surprise at every turn."

Rating the film 3.5/5, Paresh C. Palicha of Rediff said, "Drishyam can be credited for bringing Mohanlal back to form and pushing director Jeethu Joseph into the big league as he has made a cracker of a thriller."

Jabir Mushthari of The Hindu wrote: "It takes craft, intelligence, and the superior acumen of a genuine storyteller to pull off a film in such an engaging manner." He also noted that the film's "thread and treatment are new to Malayalam cinema in many ways" and its "principles go against the set rules film goers here are familiar with".

Shibu B S of The New Indian Express wrote, "For his latest outing Drishyam, Jeethu attempts a splendid mix of emotions, relationships, suspense and thrill. End result: a spectacular cinematic experience."

Dalton L. of Deccan Chronicle gave the film a 3-star rating, writing, "The limelight belongs entirely to Mohanlal. Like the versatile greats of Hollywood, this actor possesses such a vast repertoire that he isn't required to always attempt the radically new to stamp his towering persona."

Mythily Ramachandran wrote in her review for Gulf News: "Drishyam is an unforgettable picture, shorn of irrational fight sequences and mindless dance numbers."

Aswin J. Kumar of The Times of India said, "Drishyam is an elegantly crafted piece of film which Lal and Joseph can proudly hold close to their hearts."

Unni R. Nair noted in his review for Kerala9.com, "The care with which the script is done, the finesse with which the direction part is executed and the characterization and performance plus the thoughtful placing of the songs makes Drishyam worth real appreciation. That the film has almost zero-'filmy' humour is also worth noting. It's the logical manner in which the story unfolds and the very convincing manner in which the characters behave makes it impressive." The critic rated the film three in a scale of five.

IndiaGlitz's reviewer rated the film 8/10 and stated, "Drishyam is undoubtedly cladded with exceptional story telling combined with bravura performances. An undoubtedly exceptional film as far the content is concerned, the movie is a must watch for all the audiences of family and thriller movies."

=== Box office ===
According to Sify, the film "started on a low key" but "swept the box-office" from its second day of release. The film grossed ₹6.7 crores in eight days. In 31 days, following its release, Drishyam became the highest-grossing Malayalam film of all time, beating the record of Twenty:20 (2008). The film ran for more than 150 days in Kerala, with collections of over ₹42.5 crores.

The film grossed around ₹10 crores from rest of India. It ran for 100 days in Tamil Nadu. It had a 100-day theatrical run in multiplexes in Mumbai, Bengaluru, Ahmedabad and Hyderabad. The collection from the overseas markets was more than ₹4 crores, with around ₹1 crores from England alone. Drishyam became the second film to complete 100 days in the UAE after Titanic (1997) and later emerged as the longest running film in the UAE by completing 125 days, beating the 110 days run of Titanic. The film completed 100 days in 60 theaters in Kerala and rest of India.

Drishyam was the first Malayalam film to collect ₹50 crores. The film collected ₹62 crores in its theatrical run worldwide.

== Accolades ==
Award	Category	Nominee(s)	Result	Ref.
2013 Kerala State Film Awards	Best Popular Film	Drishyam	Won	
2013 Kerala State Film Awards	Special Jury Award	Kalabhavan Shajon	Won	
61st Filmfare Awards South	Best Film	Drishyam	Won	
61st Filmfare Awards South	Best Director	Jeethu Joseph	Nominated	
61st Filmfare Awards South	Best Actor (Male)	Mohanlal	Nominated	
61st Filmfare Awards South	Best Actor (Female)	Meena	Nominated	
61st Filmfare Awards South	Best Supporting Actor (Male)	Siddique	Nominated	
61st Filmfare Awards South	Best Supporting Actor (Female)	Asha Sarath	Won	
3rd South Indian International Movie Awards	Best Film	Drishyam	Won	
3rd South Indian International Movie Awards	Best Director	Jeethu Joseph	Won	
3rd South Indian International Movie Awards	Best Actor (Male)	Mohanlal	Nominated	
3rd South Indian International Movie Awards	Best Actor (Female)	Meena	Nominated	
3rd South Indian International Movie Awards	Best Supporting Actor (Female)	Asha Sarath	Nominated	
3rd South Indian International Movie Awards	Best Actor in a Negative Role	Kalabhavan Shajon	Won	
3rd South Indian International Movie Awards	Best Child Actor	Esther Anil	Nominated	
3rd South Indian International Movie Awards	Best Playback Singer (Male)	Najim Arshad	Nominated	
Amrita Film Awards	Best Film	Drishyam	Won	
Amrita Film Awards	Best Director	Jeethu Joseph	Won	
Amrita Film Awards	Best Actor (Male)	Mohanlal	Won	
Amrita Film Awards	Best Producer	Antony Perumbavoor	Won	
Amrita Film Awards	Best Supporting Actor (Female)	Asha Sarath	Won	
Amrita Film Awards	Best Playback Singer (Male)	Najim Arshad	Won	
Asianet Film Awards	Best Film	Drishyam	Won	
Asianet Film Awards	Millenium Actor	Mohanlal	Won	
Asianet Film Awards	Best Supporting Actor (Male)	Siddique	Won	
Asianet Film Awards	Best Supporting Actor (Female)	Asha Sarath	Won	
Asianet Film Awards	Best Character Actor (Female)	Meena	Won	
Asianet Film Awards	Best Actor in a Negative Role	Kalabhavan Shajon	Won	
Asiavision Awards	Best Popular Film	Drishyam	Won	
Asiavision Awards	Best Supporting Actor (Male)	Siddique	Won	
Asiavision Awards	Best Supporting Actor (Female)	Asha Sarath	Won	
Kerala Film Critics Association Awards	Best Film	Drishyam	Won	
Kerala Film Critics Association Awards	Best Director	Jeethu Joseph	Won	
Kerala Film Critics Association Awards	Best Actor (Male)	Mohanlal	Won	
Kerala Film Critics Association Awards	Best Choreography	Sabu Ram	Won	
Kerala Film Critics Association Awards	Best Playback Singer (Male)	Najim Arshad	Won	
Vanitha Film Awards	Best Film	Drishyam	Won	
Vanitha Film Awards	Best Director	Jeethu Joseph	Won	
Vayalar Film Awards	Best Script	Jeethu Joseph	Won	
Vayalar Film Awards	Best Actor (Female)	Meena	Won	
Vayalar Film Awards	Best Cinematography	Sujith Vaassudev	Won	
Jai Hind Film Awards	Best Film	Drishyam	Won	
Jai Hind Film Awards	Best Director	Jeethu Joseph	Won	
Jai Hind Film Awards	Best Actor	Mohanlal	Won	
Jai Hind Film Awards	Best Actress	Meena	Won	
Jai Hind Film Awards	Best Character Actress	Asha Sarath	Won	

== Remakes ==
Drishyam was remade into several languages. The Indian remake rights of the film were sold for ₹155 million. All the versions were commercially successful. Drishya (2014) in Kannada, Drushyam (2014) in Telugu, Papanasam (2015) in Tamil and Drishyam (2015) in Hindi. It was also remade in Sinhala language as Dharmayuddhaya (2017) and in Chinese as Sheep Without a Shepherd (2019) thereby becoming the first Indian film to be remade in Mainland China. The Indonesian remake was announced in September 2021, making it the first Indian film to be remade in Indonesian. The film was released in Indonesia on 20 August 2026. The Korean remake was announced in May 2023, it will also be the first Indian film to be remade in Korean. The film will be remade in English language, produced by India's Panorama Studios with U.S. companies Gulfstream Pictures and JOAT Films. Gulfstream's Karz and Bindley said, “The film is a timeless thriller that has entranced audiences across the globe. We can’t wait to bring the movie to fans here in the U.S.” The update on the Spanish remake was announced at the 2026 International Film Festival of Delhi.

Language	Name	Cast	Director
Kannada	Drishya (2014)	Ravichandran, Navya Nair, Asha Sharath	P. Vasu
Telugu	Drushyam (2014)	Venkatesh, Meena, Nadhiya	Sripriya
Tamil	Papanasam (2015)	Kamal Haasan, Gautami, Asha Sharath	Jeethu Joseph
Hindi	Drishyam (2015)	Ajay Devgan, Shriya Saran, Tabu	Nishikant Kamat
Sinhala	Dharmayuddhaya (2017)	Jackson Anthony, Dilhani, Kusum Renu	Cheyyar Ravi
Mandarin Chinese	Sheep Without a Shepherd (2019)	Xiao Yang, Tan Zhuo, Joan Chen	Sam Quah
Indonesian	Ayah, Aku Mau Cerita (2026)	Vino G. Bastian, Niken Anjani, Marsha Timothy	Danial Rifki

== Sequels ==
Jeethu Joseph and Mohanlal were filming for Ram prior to the COVID-19 lockdown in India, however the shooting of the film was stalled as some sequences they want to film in foreign locations, such as London and Cairo. As the crew realised that the filming would take time to continue, Jeethu decided to start the works for Sequel. Drishyam 2 was officially announced by Mohanlal on his 60th birthday, 21 May 2020. Mohanlal, Meena, Ansiba Hassan, Esther Anil, Asha Sarath, Siddique, Kozhikode Narayanan Nair, Mela Raghu, Aneesh G Menon, Shobha Mohan and Antony Perumbavoor reprise their roles.

Principal photography began on 21 September 2020, and was shot for 46 days in Kochi and Thodupuzha and it was concluded on 6 November 2020. The film was released directly through the OTT platform Amazon Prime Video on 19 February 2021.

The third instalment in the franchise Drishyam 3 was confirmed by Mohanlal on 20 February 2025, and was released worldwide on 21 May 2026, coinciding with Mohanlal's birthday.
