= Adam Ayub =

Indian actor, screenwriter, and film academician (born 1952)

- Born: 8 March 1952 (age 74); Kochi, (present day Kochi, Kerala), India
- Education: SRV High School, Ernakulam; Maharaja's College, Ernakulam; Madras Film Institute
- Occupations: Actor; screenwriter; film academician
- Years active: 1975–present
- Children: Arfaz Ayub

Adam Ayub is an Indian actor, screenwriter, and film academician, primarily associated with Malayalam cinema for over 25 years. He has also worked as an assistant/associate director with noted film makers, including P. A. Backer, K. R. Mohanan, and A. Vincent. He assisted Backer on 11 films. Additionally, he served as a film academician at the Southern Film Institute, Thiruvallam, Thiruvananthapuram, for several years. Ayub has directed several television serials and documentaries for Doordarshan, including Kumilakal (Bubbles). Kumilakal marked the debut acting role of Manoj K Jayan, one of Adam Ayub's students at the Southern Film Institute. He has also written the dialogues for the 2024 Malayalam movie Level Cross. Furthermore, Ayub appeared as a judge in the climax scene of 2021 Malayalam movie Drishyam 2.

== Early life ==
Adam Ayub was born as the son of Ayub Adam Sait. He attended SRV High School, Ernakulam (1963–66). In 1972, he graduated with a degree in Applied History from Maharaja's College, Ernakulam. Thereafter, he joined the M.G.R. Government Film and Television Training Institute in Chennai. Notably, actors Sreenivasan and Rajinikanth were his classmates at the film institute. Ayub reportedly persuaded Rajinikanth to resign from his bus conductor job with Bangalore Transport Service (later renamed Bengaluru Metropolitan Transport Corporation) and dedicate himself full-time to a career in film acting. Ayub graduated from the institute in 1975. Filmmaker Arfaz Ayub is his son.

== Partial filmography ==
As actor

- Priyamulla Sophia (1975)
- Naam Pirandha Mann (1977)
- Yaro Oraal (1978)
- Vayanadan Thampan (1978)
- Charam (1981)
- Visa (1983)
- Adhyathe Anuragam (1983)
- Pournami Raavil (1985)
- Sach (1989)
- Asthikal Pookunnu (1989)
- Mayilpeelithaalu (2002)
- Our Lady of Lourdes (2007)
- Oru Kuttanadan Blog (2018)
- At Once (2019)
- Drishyam 2 (2021)
- Kooman (2022)
- Valathu Vashathe Kallan (2026)
- Dridam (2026)
- Drishyam 3 (2026)

As assistant director

- Kabani Nadi Chuvannappol (1975)
- Chuvanna Vithukal (1977)
- Mani Muzhakkam (1977)
- Vayanadan Thampan (1978)
- Unarthupattu (1980)
- Charam (1981)
- Visa (1983)
- Asthi (1983)
- Premalekhanam (1985)
- Innalayude Baaki (1988)

As television series director

- Kumilakal (1991)
- Minnaaminungukal (2000)
