= Koottickal Jayachandran =

Indian film Actor in Malayalam movies

- Born: Kottayam
- Years active: 2002–present
- Spouse: Basanthi

Koottickal Jayachandran is an Indian actor who works in the Malayalam film industry. He started his career as a Mimicry artist. He is a well known mimicry artist and presenter of shows like 'Jagathy v. Jagathy' and 'Comedy Time' on Surya TV.

== Personal life ==
'Koottickal Jayachandran was born in Kottayam, Kerala, India. He married Basanthi.

== Filmography ==
=== Films ===
Key
†	Denotes films that have not yet been released

Year	Title	Role	Notes
2001	Raasaleela	Eby	
2002	Thilakam	Raghu	
2002	Chirikkudukka	Harikrishnan	
2004	Freedom	Kumaran	
2005	Chanthupottu	Lawrence	
2006	Vargam	Const. Poulose	
2007	Detective	Ashokan	
2012	My Boss	Villager	
2013	Memories	Merchant	
2013	Ezhamathe Varavu	Driver	
2013	Nadodimannan	Padmanabhan's friend	
2013	Drishyam	Murali	
2014	Njaan	C.B.I Officer	
2014	Beware of Dogs	Sabu	
2015	Life of Josutty	Babukuttan (Cameo)	
2015	Nellikka	Raghu	
2015	Oru Second Class Yathra	James	
2015	Akkaldhamayile Pennu	Ambulance driver	
2017	Rakshadhikari Baiju Oppu	Panchayath Member	
2017	Lakshyam	Sunny Eeppan	
2022	Naradhan	Tommy Kanjikkadan	
2022	Kara	Govindh	
2022	Pathonpatham Noottandu	Achupilla	
2024	Chithini		
2024	Thanupp	Prakash	

=== TV series ===
Year	Film	Channel	Notes
2022-2023	Rani Raja	Mazhavil Manorama	
2022-2024	Anuraga Ganam Pole	Zee Keralam	
2023	Muttathe Mulla	Asianet	
2024–2025	Constable Manju	Surya TV	
2026–present	Kunjumaalakha	Mazhavil Manorama	

TV shows

- Comedy time (Surya TV) as Host
- Padam Namukku Padam (Surya TV) as Host
- Jagathy vs Jagathy (Surya TV) as Host
- Star Magic (Flowers TV)
- Funs upon a time (Amrita TV)
