= Valathu Vashathe Kallan =

2026 Indian film

- Theatrical release poster
- Directed by: Jeethu Joseph
- Written by: Dinu Thomas Eelan
- Produced by: Shaji Nadesan
- Starring: Biju Menon; Joju George
- Cinematography: Satheesh Kurup
- Edited by: V. S. Vinayak
- Music by: Vishnu Shyam
- Production companies: August Cinema; Bedtime Stories; Cineholis
- Distributed by: Goodwill Entertainments
- Release date: 30 January 2026
- Running time: 135 minutes
- Country: India
- Language: Malayalam

Valathu Vashathe Kallan (transl. The thief on the right) is a 2026 Indian Malayalam-language crime thriller film directed by Jeethu Joseph, written by Dinu Thomas Eelan, and produced by Shaji Nadesan. The film stars Biju Menon and Joju George.

Valathu Vashathe Kallan was released on 30 January 2026 and received mixed reviews from critics.

== Plot ==
Anthony, a corrupt police officer, handles the case of Deepthi, a college student who attempts to file a complaint against her classmate Rajeev for trying to sexually assault her. Rajeev is a friend of Philip - Anthony's son - and his father is a powerful politician. Acting on his superior's instructions, Anthony refuses to register Deepthi's complaint and instead accuses her of indecency in front of her mother. Unable to bear the humiliation, Deepthi commits suicide. Deepthi's friend Irene Samuel, a human rights activist, confronts Anthony and vows to hold him accountable and seek justice for Deepthi.

One year later, Irene goes missing. Her father, Samuel Joseph (aka Sam, Joju George), files a missing-person complaint with the police. The police begin an investigation and eventually discover Irene's body in a forest. Sam, an intelligent hacker, also investigates independently. Through another police officer, he learns that Irene had made enemies because of her work, including Rajeev and Anthony. Irene was due to testify in court against Rajeev and Anthony, giving both men a possible motive for her murder.

Sam subsequently kidnaps Rajeev and tortures him. He sends a video of it to Anthony, warning him that he knows Anthony was also responsible for Irene's death and that he will be next. The police begin searching for both Sam and Rajeev. Sam later surrenders to Anthony at the police station with the assistance of a group of news media workers. Anthony tortures Sam in an attempt to force him to reveal Rajeev's whereabouts, but Sam refuses. He then reveals that he has also kidnapped Philip and buried him alive inside a coffin, warning Anthony that he has little time left to save him. Sam gives Anthony a clue — a telephone number — before committing suicide, suggesting that he has arranged a game for Anthony to play in order to find Philip.

The police discover that the number belongs to Ahmed Mustafa, a convicted murderer and rapist who died by suicide years earlier. Anthony had handled Ahmed's case. Soon afterward, a video of former MLA Indira being kidnapped reaches the media and is broadcast live. In the video, Indira is held captive and forced to confess that her son committed a rape and murder, while she used her political influence and Anthony's assistance to frame Ahmed Mustafa for the crimes. Indira is eventually rescued by the police.

Another clue prepared by Sam then reaches Anthony: the case of Elizabeth's murder. The case remains unsolved and bears striking similarities to Irene's murder. Believing that it will lead him to another clue, Anthony contacts Elizabeth's family, but the call is forwarded to Theresa, Sam's wife. Theresa explains what Sam discovered:

While investigating Anthony's possible involvement in Irene's death, Sam dug into Anthony's entire history. He discovered that, as a result of Anthony's troubled upbringing, Philip had gradually developed an extreme hatred toward strong and independent women. Philip's therapist had warned Anthony that his increasingly severe misogynistic behavior could eventually turn him into a violent criminal. Rajeev had confessed to Sam during the torture that Elizabeth was Philip's girlfriend. After Philip discovered that Elizabeth was a feminist, he brutally murdered her. Rajeev also revealed that Philip murdered Irene for the same reason.

After revealing this information, Theresa gives Anthony another clue — a telephone number — and then commits suicide. The number belongs to Anthony himself. Believing that it indicates the location where Philip is being held, the police go to Anthony's house and dig up the grounds. However, they find only Rajeev, who is still alive, and are unable to locate Philip. Anthony then pieces together all the clues: Philip, Indira, Elizabeth, Theresa, and Anthony. He realizes that their initial letters spell "PIETA". Concluding that Philip must have been buried beneath a Pietà statue, Anthony goes there to rescue him.

Anthony finds Philip buried beneath the statue. However, Sam's elaborate game has forced Anthony to confront the consequences of his own actions and the lives he has destroyed, including Philip's. His late wife Mary, who knew the truth about his character, had refused to forgive him before her death. Overwhelmed by guilt, Anthony makes a final decision: rather than rescue Philip, he leaves him buried beneath the statue as redemption.

In the final scene, Anthony surrenders to the authorities. He confesses to all the crimes he personally committed and also claims responsibility for the murders committed by Philip.

== Cast ==
- Biju Menon as CI Antony Xavier
- Joju George as Samuel Joseph
- Lena as Theresa Joseph
- Leona Lishoy as ASI Vidhya Shekhar
- Vyshnavi Raj as Irene Samuel
- Niranjana Anoop as Veena
- Shaju Sreedhar as DySP Firose
- Irshad as Head Constable Johnny Vincent
- Manoj K. U. as SP B. Krishnakumar IPS
- Shyamaprasad as Psychiatrist
- Santhi Mayadevi as Forensic Surgeon Seetha
- Rinosh George as Rajeev
- K. R. Gokul as Phillip Antony
- Shiva Hariharan as Johnny's son
- Remya Suresh as Ex-Aluva MLA Indira
- Abhiram Radhakrishnan as SI Devan
- Arfaz Ayub as Emmanuel
- Shraddha Gokul as Deepthi
- Priya Sreejith as Revathi
- Krishna Prabha as SI Sandhya
- Jolly Chirayath as Sreedevi
- Adam Ayub as Dr. Radhakrishnan

== Production ==
The project was officially announced on 21 April 2025 by Jeethu Joseph. Principal photography began in May 2025 in Kochi with a pooja ceremony. Filming wrapped on 11 August 2025.

== Release ==
Valathu Vashathe Kallan was released on 30 January 2026.

=== Streaming rights ===
The Streaming rights of this movie were later acquired by both OTT platforms Amazon Prime Video, ManoramaMAX, Simply South, AP International South Cinema and Lionsgate Play on 27 March 2026 and Aha on 30 April 2026 for its Tamil version and 8 May 2026 for its Telugu version. While the Hindi version of this movie is also available on JioHotstar.

== Reception ==
A mixed review in The Hindu wrote: "Part of the film works because of the presence of the two towering performers in Biju Menon and Joju George, who, even when they are not at their best, lend some gravitas to the proceedings. Although Jeethu’s films are not particularly known for their visual or technical aspects, here the darker tone sits well with the theme until the screenplay spoils the game." Other reviews were also mixed, similarly praising the two lead male actors’ performances but particularly criticising the plot, judged confused. Anandu Suresh of The Indian Express gave 1.5 out of 5 stars, writing "Jeethu Joseph delivers yet another unsatisfactory crime thriller aimed solely at outsmarting the audience". Vishal Menon of The Hollywood Reporter India said that "For all the credit Jeethu Joseph gets for being the Malayalam master of suspense, one doesn’t realise how often he’s made films that talk about something as soft and subtle as parenting."

== Controversies ==
The film became the subject of controversy following allegations regarding its promotional activities. B. Unnikrishnan, general secretary of the Film Employees Federation of Kerala (FEFKA), criticised lead actor Biju Menon for allegedly failing to participate in any promotional events associated with the film.

According to Unnikrishnan, Menon's absence from promotional commitments reportedly part of his agreement led to a financial loss of approximately ₹25 lakh for the producer, including the loss of a potential television deal.

Separately, Joby George, one of the film's distributors also criticised Menon and stated that the film resulted in a loss of approximately ₹16 crore, describing it as the first loss-making project for his banner, Goodwill Entertainments.
