= Mr. & Ms. Rowdy =

- Theatrical release poster
- Directed by: Jeethu Joseph
- Written by: Jeethu Joseph
- Story by: Linta Jeethu
- Produced by: Gokulam Gopalan; Jeethu Joseph
- Starring: Kalidas Jayaram; Aparna Balamurali
- Cinematography: Satheesh Kurup
- Edited by: Ayoob Khan
- Music by: Songs: Arun Vijay; Score: Anil Johnson
- Production companies: Sree Gokulam Movies; Vintage Films
- Distributed by: Central Pictures
- Release date: 22 February 2019 (India)
- Running time: 138 minutes
- Country: India
- Language: Malayalam

Mr. & Ms. Rowdy is a 2019 Indian Malayalam-language buddy comedy film written and directed by Jeethu Joseph. It is produced by Gokulam Gopalan and Jeethu Joseph under the banner of Sree Gokulam Movies. The film stars Kalidas Jayaram, Aparna Balamurali, Ganapathi and Shebin Benson in lead roles.

== Plot Summary ==
Appu and his group of friends, Maniyan, Pathro, Asif, and Anto, are a tight-knit squad of wannabe goons. Driven by financial desperation and the need to support their families, they attempt to establish themselves as local tough guys. However, they are far from professional; their "missions" are often absurd, petty, and poorly executed, leading to frequent public embarrassments rather than the feared reputation they crave.

Their aimless lives take a sharp turn when Appu crosses paths with Poornima, a bold and feisty girl. Their initial encounter is marked by immediate hostility, evolving into a humorous "war of the sexes" as they constantly clash. Poornima, far from a damsel in distress, is more than capable of holding her own against the boys, frequently challenging their fragile egos.

As the story progresses, the group finds themselves entangled in a convoluted kidnapping scheme involving an influential businessman named Jeevan. What begins as another amateur attempt at a "quotation" job spirals into a chaotic series of misunderstandings and comedic mishaps. As the stakes rise, the friends are forced to confront the reality of their "rowdy" aspirations.

Ultimately, the film shifts from the absurdity of their criminal pursuits toward themes of redemption and personal growth. The group’s deep camaraderie is tested, and they must learn to navigate the consequences of their choices. By the end, they abandon their misguided path, realizing that their self-fashioned tough-guy images are not only unsustainable but deeply incompatible with their true nature.

== Cast ==
- Kalidas Jayaram as Appu
- Aparna Balamurali as Poornima
- Shebin Benson as Pathrose
- Ganapathi as Asif
- Vishnu Govindan as Antappan
- Sarath Sabha as Maniyan
- Vijay Babu as Jeevan George
- Vijayaraghavan as Father Pulikoodan
- Esther Anil as Anu
- Irshad as Film Star
- Shaheen Siddique as Dominic
- Saikumar as Varghese Mappila
- Dinesh Prabhakar as Paint shop owner
- Ambika Mohan as Varghese's wife
- Sanuja Somanath as Veni
- Naseer Sankranthi as Sadanandan
- Joy Mathew as Abraham Mathew
- Baiju V.K. as SP Dasan
- Manju Satheesh as Anu's mother
- Pauly Valsan as Hostel warden
- Santhakumari as Valyamachi
- Bhagath Manuel as Pachu
- Meghanathan as Poornima's father
- Babu Annur as Poornima's uncle
- Jeethu Joseph as Car buyer (cameo appearance)

== Music ==
The film's music is composed by Arun Vijay, with lyrics written by Harinarayanan. The background score was composed by Anil Johnson.

All tracks are written by Harinarayanan.

No.	Title	Singer(s)	Length
1.	"Ushirathi Penn"	Afsal, Arun Vijay, Gubbi	4:51
2.	"Puthiya Vazhi"	Najim Arshad, Arun Vijay	3:56

== Marketing ==
The teaser was released on 11 January 2019. The trailer was released on 25 January 2019.

== Reception ==
The Times of India gave 3.5 out of 5 and wrote, "Mr and Ms Rowdy can sure be a great one-time watch, for the chemistry of the lead actors and the comedy in their goofiness."
