= Detective (2007 film) =

- Theatrical release poster
- Directed by: Jeethu Joseph
- Written by: Jeethu Joseph
- Produced by: Mahi
- Starring: Suresh Gopi; Sindhu Menon
- Cinematography: Anandakuttan
- Edited by: P. C. Mohanan
- Music by: Rajamani
- Distributed by: Super Release
- Release date: 16 February 2007
- Running time: 135 minutes
- Country: India
- Language: Malayalam

Detective is a 2007 Indian Malayalam-language crime thriller film written and directed by Jeethu Joseph in his directorial debut. The film stars Suresh Gopi in a dual role and Sindhu Menon. It was a box-office success.

== Plot ==
Rashmi is found dead under mysterious circumstances and her death is reportedly declared a suicide. Rashmi's family is in a deep sorrow and her father Prabhakaran Thampi blames his son-in-law Mohan Kumar, a bold politician, for his daughter's death. Soon, everyone starts doubting Mohan and the party terminates him from being elected as an MP and appoints his friend Jose as the new MP. However, Jose didn't believe any false statements of the society and was sure of Mohan's innocence. SP James Joseph convinced everyone of Mohan being the culprit and arrests him briefly. A suicide note is found where its written that Mohan is reason for Rashmi's death.

As the case proceeds, Mohan's twin step-brother Shyam Prasad, a well known police detective and investigator is appointed to investigate the case. He is assisted by Basheer, Shekhar, Rajeev and Aravind. Everyone tries hard to find out the reason behind Rashmi's apparent suicide. Shyam and team go to Rashmi's house to enquire her whereabouts. Her father doesn't say much but claims that Mohan was the actual reason for Rashmi's death. Suresh, their relative gives further clarification about Mohan's and Rashmi's marriage. Shyam continues his investigation further. After many researches and gathering proofs such as fingerprints, Shyam discovers that the Rashmi's suicide note was fabricated by James and John Samuel and her death was not a suicide, but a murder. John Samuel and James decide to get rid of Shyam and send some goons in order to finish him off. But Shyam courageously defeats all and arrests James and John Samuel.

In a conference with the DGP and the Chief Minister, Shyam puts forth the facts, to the people in the conference Hall that Rashmi's death was a murder, where everyone gets shocked. Shyam reveals that Rashmi was actually pretending to love Mohan after she realised Mohan's plan of being the MP and she avoided her boyfriend who was her problem when she decided to marry Mohan. Shyam reveals that Rashmi was killed by her boyfriend Sumesh, who was Rashmi's and Mohan's neighbour. The crowd begin having doubts, on how a simple man like Sumesh could kill his own girlfriend. Shyam and team brings Sumesh's friend Vinod to gather more information about the events that had happened the night when Sumesh reached Rashmi's house. Shyam also takes in Sumesh to question him why on he had done it. But Sumesh maintains that he hasn't killed Rashmi. However, when Shyam and his colleagues provoke him, he gets in a rage and finally admits that he killed Rashmi, saying that Shyam and team have no proof regarding the murder. He injures himself and rushes back to the conference Hall to fool everyone. But whatever he disclosed to Shyam was already displayed on a screen. Shyam knew how Sumesh had done it and Sumesh reveals everything.

In a flashback, Sumesh and Rashmi were lovers from childhood. Even though both had fallen in love with each other, Rashmi soon began avoiding Sumesh as per her family's wish. Sumesh understands her and tells her to follow her parents' wish. But shortly, he visits her in order to deliver milk and overhears her conversation with her parents. He came to know that it was Rashmi who wanted to marry Mohan and her parents were against it, as they were afraid of the insecurities in marrying a politician and she was cheating Sumesh all the while. So in order to seek revenge, Sumesh decided to kill Rashmi after she married Mohan. He seeks the help of Vinod and got addicted to drugs. He learned the schedule of Rashmi in the absence of Mohan and stole the key of Rashmi's bedroom to make a duplicate. One night after arriving from Bangalore, Sumesh rushes towards Rashmi's house without her knowledge. Meanwhile, Mohan went away from the house after an argument with Rashmi. Sumesh waited for his chance and brought the required tools along with a bottle of strong poison with him. At first he poisoned a jar of milk kept in the room. But the plan failed. Subsequently, he had climbed up a ladder to reach the ventilator and attached some pieces of plastic pipes after tying a thread on its end. As Rashmi slept, Sumesh bought the thread quietly to Rashmi's mouth. He then sent poison to Rashmi's mouth via the pipe and thread. That was how Rashmi lost control and died. After that he burnt all the materials including bottles, gloves and dropped the bottle that contained poison to make everyone believe that it was a suicide.

Back to the present, Shyam further explains that he understood the method of murder by observing the poison drops being dropped from Rashmi's bed to the ventilator in a straight line and often the drops were of different sizes. He further explains that the culprit had entered the house to switch off the inverter. This was to keep the ceiling fan out of use in order to hold the thread used for the murder steady. The police arrests Sumesh and the DGP and Chief Minister appreciate Shyam while Rashmi's family apologizes to Mohan as his innocence was proven. Mohan and Shyam happily smile at each other. The film ends as Shyam and team leave the conference hall.

== Cast ==
- Suresh Gopi in a dual role as:
  - Detective Shyamaprasad
  - Politician Mohan Kumar, Shyamaprasad's stepbrother
- Sindhu Menon as Reshmi, Mohan Kumar's wife
- Saikumar as SP James Joseph IPS
- Devan as DGP
- Madhu Warrier as Detective Basheer
- Subair as John Samuel, James Joseph's friend
- Prem Prakash as Chief Minister of Kerala
- Jagathy Sreekumar as Detective Chandrachoodan
- Kalabhavan Prajod as Sumesh, Reshmi's friend and ex-lover
- Cochin Haneefa as Opposition Leader, Chandrachoodan's brother-in-law
- Babu Namboothiri as Prabhakaran Thampi, Reshmi's father and Mohan Kumar's father-in-law
- Ponnamma Babu as Devaki, Reshmi's mother and Mohan Kumar's mother-in-law
- T. P. Madhavan as forensic surgeon
- Augustine as Thankachan
- Baiju Santhosh as Suresh, Reshmi's cousin
- Madhupal as Kumbalam Jose, Mohan Kumar's friend
- Joju George as Detective Shekhar
- Koottickal Jayachandran as Ashokan, Sumesh's brother
- Baiju V.K. as Police Inspector
- Cherthala Lalitha as Reshmi's servant
- Suresh Prem as Vinod, Sumesh's friend
- Subi Suresh as journalist
- Jagannatha Varma as Father Gabriel
