= Mirage (2025 film) =

2025 Indian-Malayalam language film

- Theatrical release poster
- Directed by: Jeethu Joseph
- Written by: Srinivasan Abrol; Jeethu Joseph
- Story by: Aparna R. Tarakad
- Produced by: Mukesh R. Mehta; Jatin M. Sethi; C. V. Sarathi; Vikram Mehra; Siddharth Anand Kumar
- Starring: Asif Ali; Aparna Balamurali; Hakim Shahjahan; Hannah Reji Koshy
- Cinematography: Satheesh Kurup
- Edited by: V. S. Vinayak
- Music by: Vishnu Shyam
- Production companies: E4 Enertainment; Saregama; Seven 1 Seven Productions; Naad Studios; Bedtime Stories
- Release date: 19 September 2025
- Running time: 150 minutes
- Country: India
- Language: Malayalam

Mirage is a 2025 Indian Malayalam-language mystery thriller film co-written and directed by Jeethu Joseph. The film stars Asif Ali, Aparna Balamurali, Hakim Shahjahan and Hannah Reji Koshy. The film was released on 19 September 2025, and received mixed reviews from critics.

This movie was a box-office bomb.

== Plot ==
The film follows Abirami, a young woman who begins a new life at a financial consultancy firm, where she falls in love with a colleague named Kiran. Their relationship is interrupted when Kiran goes missing during a trip to Palakkad, with subsequent reports suggesting he died in a train accident.

Following his disappearance, Abirami is approached by two individuals seeking a pendrive allegedly in Kiran's possession: a police officer named Aarumugam, who claims Kiran was an undercover operative gathering evidence against the firm’s corrupt owner, Rajkumar; and an investigative journalist named Ashwin, who asserts that Kiran is still alive.

Abirami joins forces with Ashwin to locate the pendrive. As the investigation progresses, it is revealed that Abirami is actually Anjali Chandran, who has assumed a false identity to seek vengeance for her sister’s suicide, which was caused by two men who assaulted her years prior. The investigation eventually reveals that the two men responsible for the assault are Kiran (whose real name is Amal) and Ashwin (whose real name is Anand Shankar).

The narrative concludes with the revelation that Ashwin and Kiran were partners in crime who manipulated the situation for financial gain. After the truth is uncovered, Anjali kills Ashwin to complete her retribution.

== Cast ==
- Asif Ali as Aswin Kumar / Anand Shankar-The Main Antagonist
- Aparna Balamurali as Abirami / Anjali
- Hakim Shahjahan as Kiran / Amal-Secondary Antagonist
- Hannah Reji Koshy as Rithika
- Saravanan as Rajkumar
- Sampath Raj as SP Y. Aarumugam IPS
- Deepak Parambol as Prakash
- Arjun Syam Gopan as Anandu
- Aruvi Madhan as Riyas
- Priya Sreejith as maid

== Production ==
The project was officially announced on 6 January 2025. A pooja ceremony was held on 20 January 2025 in Kozhikode as part of commencing the shoot with principal photography commencing the following day.

== Release ==
=== Theatrical ===
The first look poster of the film was released on 23 June 2025. The second look poster was released on 1 August 2025. The film's teaser was released on 17 August 2025.

Mirage was released theatrically on 19 September 2025.

=== Home media ===
The film began streaming on SonyLIV from 23 October 2025, a month after its theatrical release on 19 September 2025.

== Music ==
The film's music was composed by Vishnu Shyam.

No.	Title	Lyrics	Singer(s)	Length
1.	"Ilavenal Poove"	Vinayak Sasikumar	Najim Arshad	3:08

== Reception ==
=== Critical reception ===
Gopika Is of The Times of India rated the film 2.5 out of 5 stars and wrote that the film "makes it a passable crime thriller at best." She stated that the film has a slow pace, with the plot taking a long time to unfold. She also states that the film "struggles to connect the audience with its characters." She pointed out that the plot has multiple "twists and turns" and a "surprising ending," but many plot points are revealed abruptly without proper foreshadowing, and the numerous twists don't lead to a substantial conclusion. She noted that Aparna Balamurali's acting was "believable" in some points but "lacked intensity." She criticised the dialogues, the word choices and delivery as it "robbed all the intensity it deserved".

S. R. Praveen of The Hindu criticises the film's weak screenplay and its over-reliance on excessive and unbelievable plot twists, which drains the film of any impact. He further criticises that instead of a "perfect thriller climax," the film resulted in a complicated and predictable narrative. He also noted that the film fails to maintain an intriguing pace despite approaching the mystery straight away. According to the review, the "dramatic" presentation, "stilted" dialogue, and "obvious" character reveals make the film's twists "almost laughable." He wrote: "The absence of a coherent, believable screenplay and the compulsion to deliver one shocking twist after another drains 'Mirage' of any impact."

Princy Alexander of Onmanorama praised the cast performance, stating that Aparna Balamurali and Asif Ali share an "honest and natural chemistry." She notes that the twists were "compelling", while some scenes were "predictable." She also notes that the film's climax is somewhat underwhelming due to an overindulgence in suspense, and the female character's backstory motifs are "repetitive". She felt the background score "blends with the narrative" but found it was a "bit underwhelming." She praised the cinematography as "clean and unfussy." She wrote: "Overall, Mirage works as an engaging watch, with Jeethu delivering his trademark twists. But the burden of expectations and a tendency to overplay surprises hold the film back from becoming truly memorable."

Anandu Suresh of The Indian Express rated Mirage 1.5 out of 5 stars and criticised the screenplay being "hollow" despite having frequent twists. He states that the film relies heavily on dialogue rather than visual storytelling. Despite having many twists, he points out that none of them are sufficiently surprising or emotionally engaging, which fails to hold the audience's attention. He criticised the weak characterisation of the characters as they seem "flat". He also gave a mixed review of the cast performance. He criticised the cinematography as "weird camera angles," and the music fails to uplift meaningfully. He wrote: "In the Asif Ali and Aparna Balamurali-starer, director Jeethu Joseph has tried to inflate a wafer-thin plot and an equally papery script by slipping in ineffectual twists very frequently."
