= Mela Raghu =

Indian actor (died 2021)

Raghu (Sasidaran)
- Born: Sasidaran; Chengannur, Kerala
- Died: 3 May 2021 (age 60); Cherthala
- Occupation: Actor
- Years active: 1980–2021

Mela Raghu (Puthenveli Sasidharan) was an Indian actor who worked in the Malayalam film industry.

== Biography ==
In 1980, at a circus show in Kozhikode, Raghu caught the attention of actor Sreenivasan and acted in the film Mela. With his performance in this film, he came to be known as Mela Raghu. He later acted in films in Malayalam and Tamil, including the film Apoorva Sagodharargal.

== Death ==
Raghu died on 3 May 2021, at Amrita Institute of Medical science Hospital in Kochi.

== Filmography ==
- Mela (1980)
- Sanchari (1981)
- Kakkothikkavile Appooppan Thaadikal (1988)
- Apoorva Sagodharargal (1989)
- Irikku M.D. Akathundu (1991)
- Mukha Chithram (1991)
- O' Faby (1993)
- Athbhutha Dweepu (2005)
- Best Actor (2010)
- Oru Indian Pranayakadha (2013)
- Drishyam (2013)
- Drishyam 2 (2021)
