= Jeethu Joseph =

Indian filmmaker (born 1972)

- Jeethu Joseph in 2019
- Born: 10 November 1972 (age 54); Muvattupuzha, Kerala, India
- Occupations: Director; screenwriter; producer
- Years active: 2007–present
- Spouse: Linta
- Children: 2

Jeethu Joseph (born 10 November 1972) is an Indian film director, screenwriter, and producer who predominantly works in Malayalam cinema. He has also worked in a few Tamil, Hindi and Telugu films, a few of which are remade from his own Malayalam films. He made his directional debut with the 2007 suspense thriller Detective. He is best known for directing the 2013 crime thriller Drishyam starring Mohanlal, which was the highest-grossing Malayalam film at the time of its release. Its sequel Drishyam 2 (2021) was released on Amazon Prime Video, due to the COVID-19 pandemic. Like its prequel, it was highly acclaimed and appreciated worldwide.

His other works include Mummy & Me (2010), My Boss (2012), Memories (2013), Life of Josutty (2015), Oozham (2016), Aadhi (2018), Neru (2023), Nunakkuzhi (2024), and Mirage (2025). Jeethu made his Tamil debut with Papanasam (2015), a remake of his 2013 film Drishyam, Hindi debut with The Body (2019), and Telugu debut with Drushyam 2 (2021), a remake of Drishyam 2.

== Early life ==
Jeethu Joseph was born at Mutholapuram, a small village near Muvattupuzha in the Ernakulam district of Kerala. His father, V. V. Joseph, was a politician who belonged to the Kerala Congress (Joseph) party and served as the MLA from Muvattupuzha Assembly constituency.

Jeethu studied at Fatima Matha School in Piravom and then at St. Berchmans College, Changanassery, before completing his B.A. degree in Economics from Nirmala College, Muvattupuzha. During this time, he aspired to study at the Film and Television Institute of India, Pune, although his father wanted him to become an engineer.

== Career ==
Jeethu Joseph started his career as an assistant director to Jayaraj. He got a chance to direct a film starring Dileep however it failed to materialize. Meanwhile, Jeethu developed the one-line plot of Detective. After failing to find a producer, his mother Leelamma Joseph offered to co-produce the film, which became his directorial debut. A month into the project, a producer took interest and agreed to produce the film. Detective was released in 2007. The film fared well at the box-office.

His next film, the comedy-drama Mummy & Me was a box-office success. Though it took close to three years in the making, Mummy & Me marked a turning point in his career as a director. "My first film was easy compared to the struggle I had to go through for my second, Mummy and Me." There were offers to make films like Detective, but Jeethu declined. "I wanted to do a different film" It was for this reason that, though he had one line scripts of Mummy and Me and Memories ready in 2008, he chose to make Mummy and Me. His third film My Boss starring Dileep was also a commercial success. His fourth film, the slasher thriller Memories starring Prithviraj Sukumaran was released in 2013 and was a blockbuster at the box-office.

In 2013, he directed the crime thriller Drishyam starring Mohanlal, which was critically and commercially acclaimed. It was the highest-grossing Malayalam film, until 2016, and the first Malayalam film to cross the ₹50 crore mark at the box-office. Drishyam has been remade into four regional languages including Tamil, Telugu, Hindi, and Kannada, as well as internationally in Sinhalese and Mandarin Chinese. In 2015, he directed Life of Josutty starring Dileep and Papanasam, the Tamil remake of Drishyam starring Kamal Haasan. His next directorial, Oozham (2016), starring Prithviraj was a commercial success. In 2018, he directed the action-thriller Aadhi which marked the acting of debut of Pranav Mohanlal. Aadhi received positive reviews from critics and was a commercial success at the box-office.

In 2021, he directed Drishyam 2, the sequel to his 2013 film Drishyam which released on Amazon Prime Video. Like its prequel, it was critically acclaimed by critics. The third instalment in the franchise, Drishyam 3, was released on the 21 May 2026.

== Personal life ==
Jeethu is married to Linta. The couple have two daughters, Catherine Ann and Katina Ann. Linta is a costume designer who has worked on several of his films.

== Filmography ==
Year	Title	Credited as		Language	Notes
Year	Title	Director	Screenwriter	Language	Notes
2007	Detective	Yes	Yes	Malayalam	
2010	Mummy & Me	Yes	Yes	Malayalam	
2012	My Boss	Yes	Yes	Malayalam	
2013	Memories	Yes	Yes	Malayalam	
2013	Drishyam	Yes	Yes	Malayalam	
2015	Papanasam	Yes	Yes	Tamil	Remake of Drishyam
2015	Life of Josutty	Yes	No	Malayalam	
2016	Oozham	Yes	Yes	Malayalam	
2017	Lakshyam	No	Yes	Malayalam	
2018	Aadhi	Yes	Yes	Malayalam	
2019	Mr. & Ms. Rowdy	Yes	Yes	Malayalam	
2019	The Body	Yes	Yes	Hindi	Based on The Body
2019	Thambi	Yes	Screenplay	Tamil	
2021	Drishyam 2	Yes	Yes	Malayalam	
2021	Drushyam 2	Yes	Yes	Telugu	Remake of Drishyam 2
2022	12th Man	Yes	No	Malayalam	Disney+ Hotstar release; voiceover for Merin's brother
2022	Kooman	Yes	No	Malayalam	
2023	Neru	Yes	Yes	Malayalam	
2024	Nunakkuzhi	Yes	No	Malayalam	
2025	Mirage	Yes	Yes	Malayalam	
2026	Valathu Vashathe Kallan	Yes	No	Malayalam	
2026	Drishyam 3	Yes	Yes	Malayalam	
TBA	Untitled Fahadh Faasil Project †	Yes	No	Malayalam	
TBA	Ram †	Yes	Yes	Malayalam	

=== As producer ===
Year	Title	Language	Notes
2017	Lakshyam	Malayalam	
2019	Mr. & Ms. Rowdy	Malayalam	
2022	Antakshari	Malayalam	Presenter; SonyLIV release
2024	Level Cross	Malayalam	Presenter
2026	Secret Stories: Roslin	Malayalam	Presenter; JioHotstar series
2026	Dridam	Malayalam	Presenter

== Awards and nominations ==
Year	Award	Category	Film	Result	Ref
2014	44th Kerala State Film Awards	Best Popular Film	Drishyam	Won	
2014	Vanitha Film Awards	Best Director	Drishyam	Won	
2014	Kerala Film Critics Association Awards	Best Director	Drishyam	Won	
2014	Jaihind TV Film Awards	Best Director	Drishyam	Won	
2014	South Indian International Movie Awards	Best Director	Drishyam	Won	
2016	63rd Filmfare Awards South	Best Director	Papanasam	Nominated	
2022	67th Filmfare Awards South	Best Director	Drishyam 2	Nominated	
2022	South Indian International Movie Awards	Best Director	Drishyam 2	Nominated	
2025	South Indian International Movie Awards	Best Director	Neru	Nominated	
2025	Filmfare Awards South	Best Director	Neru	Nominated	
