= Drishyam 2 =

2021 Indian film by Jeethu Joseph

- Promotional poster
- Directed by: Jeethu Joseph
- Written by: Jeethu Joseph
- Produced by: Antony Perumbavoor
- Starring: Mohanlal; Meena; Ansiba Hassan; Esther Anil; Siddique; Murali Gopy; Asha Sarath
- Cinematography: Satheesh Kurup
- Edited by: V. S. Vinayak
- Music by: Anil Johnson
- Production company: Aashirvad Cinemas
- Distributed by: Amazon Prime Video
- Release date: 19 February 2021
- Running time: 153 minutes
- Country: India
- Language: Malayalam

Drishyam 2: The Resumption is a 2021 Indian Malayalam-language crime drama film written and directed by Jeethu Joseph. It was produced by Antony Perumbavoor under the banner of Aashirvad Cinemas. A sequel to the 2013 film Drishyam and second instalment in the Drishyam film series, the film stars Mohanlal, Meena, Ansiba Hassan, Esther Anil, Asha Sharath, Murali Gopy, and Siddique.

Jeethu Joseph wrote the script for Drishyam 2 during a pause in production for his other film Ram, owing to the COVID-19 pandemic. The project was officially announced on 21 May 2020, coinciding with Mohanlal's 60th birthday. Principal photography began on 21 September 2020 and wrapped on 6 November 2020, following strict safety protocols. The film was shot over 46 days, primarily in and around Thodupuzha, retaining the same locations used in the first film, with additional scenes shot in Kochi. Anil Johnson composed the music and film score, while the cinematography and editing were handled by Satheesh Kurup and V. S. Vinayak, respectively.

Originally intended for a theatrical release, the producers later opted to release the film through the streaming service Amazon Prime Video. Drishyam 2 was released worldwide on 19 February 2021. Like its predecessor, it received widespread critical acclaim, with particular praise for its narrative and performance, particularly Mohanlal's. It was scheduled for a theatrical rerelease on 10 April 2026, several years after its initial direct-to-video premiere.

The third instalment in the franchise Drishyam 3 was released on 21 May 2026.

== Plot ==
In the early morning of 4 August 2013, a man named Jose George goes on the run after murdering his brother-in-law. While hiding near an under-construction police station, he notices Georgekutty emerging from the compound late at night under suspicious circumstances. Before Jose can make sense of what he witnessed, the police capture and arrest him while he attempts to flee with his family.

By 2019, Georgekutty, Rani, Anju, and Anu are leading a far more comfortable life. Georgekutty is now a successful businessman who owns a movie theatre and has ambitions of producing a film someday. However, Varun's death continues to haunt the family. Anju suffers from severe psychological trauma caused by the incident and lives in constant fear and anxiety. Rumours about her past occasionally spread through the town, leaving Rani emotionally disturbed and increasingly protective of her daughter. During this period, Rani grows close to her neighbour Saritha, often confiding in her about the struggles their family has endured. Unknown to Rani, Saritha and her abusive husband Sabu are actually undercover police officers planted near the family by Inspector General of Police Thomas Bastin, who has reopened Varun's case at the request of Geetha Prabhakar.

Meanwhile, Jose George is released from prison after completing his sentence. Struggling to reconnect with his estranged family and desperate to find work, he eventually learns that the police have reopened the Varun investigation. Suddenly recalling the events of the night he was arrested years earlier, Jose realises that Georgekutty had been near the unfinished police station at the exact time Varun went missing. Sensing the importance of this memory, he informs Thomas about what he saw for the reward money.

Thomas immediately contacts Geetha and Prabhakar before organizing an excavation beneath the now-completed police station. To everyone's shock, skeletal remains are discovered buried underneath the building.

Georgekutty, who has secretly been monitoring the police station through surveillance cameras installed nearby, notices the excavation taking place and realizes the situation has spiraled beyond his control. Soon after, he surrenders before the authorities.

Thomas summons Georgekutty and his family for interrogation. Despite intense questioning, Georgekutty, Rani, Anju, and Anu firmly maintain the same alibi they had given years earlier. However, the investigation takes a dramatic turn when the police obtain a secretly recorded conversation in which Rani unknowingly reveals details about Varun's death to Saritha. The police also discover that the family had been under surveillance for months.

As pressure mounts on his wife and daughters, Georgekutty finally claims responsibility for the crime in an attempt to shield his family from legal punishment. Although the police believe they have finally solved the case, Geetha remains unconvinced and continues demanding justice for Varun.

The matter soon reaches court, where Georgekutty unexpectedly pleads not guilty. His lawyer argues that the police have fabricated the entire case using the storyline of a crime novel titled Drishyam, written by Vinayachandran. It is revealed that Georgekutty himself had narrated the story idea to the writer years earlier while discussing a possible film project. At the same time, forensic reports create chaos inside the courtroom when DNA analysis confirms that the skeleton recovered from the police station does not belong to Varun.

Vinayachandran later discloses that Georgekutty had once narrated an alternate ending for his proposed crime thriller. In that version, the protagonist, anticipating that his original cover-up could someday be uncovered, secretly arranges for another unidentified corpse of a similar age and build to be used as a substitute. Over the years, he carefully preserves the skeletal remains while slowly gaining the trust of a morgue employee at the district medical college under the guise of discussing a role in his upcoming film project. On the very night the remains recovered from the police station are transferred for forensic examination, the protagonist quietly switches the bodies before the DNA testing can expose the truth.

The police slowly realize that Georgekutty had anticipated every possible outcome long before the investigation was reopened. Due to the complete lack of conclusive evidence, the court grants Georgekutty bail and orders the police to discontinue further action against him and his family.

Later, Vinayachandran quietly reveals to Geetha and Prabhakar that Georgekutty's “alternate climax” had one final twist, the protagonist would anonymously return the victim's buried remains to his grieving parents so they could finally perform his last rites.

At the same time, Geetha and Prabhakar receive Varun's remains anonymously. As Varun's remains are being finally immersed, Thomas quietly urges Geetha and Prabhakar to let go of their pursuit of Georgekutty. He admits that throughout the investigation, Georgekutty had always remained one step ahead, willing to go to any extent to protect his family. Thomas realizes that, while the police believed they were constantly watching Georgekutty, in reality it was Georgekutty who had been observing them all along, patiently anticipating every move they would make next. As Geetha and Prabhakar finally begin to find closure, Georgekutty watches from a distance before silently walking away, continuing to live in constant vigilance for whatever may come next.

== Cast ==
- Mohanlal as Georgekutty, a movie theatre owner and aspiring film producer
- Meena as Rani George, Georgekutty's wife
- Ansiba Hassan as Anju George, Georgekutty and Rani's elder daughter; a PTSD patient
- Esther Anil as Anu George; Georgekutty and Rani's younger daughter
- Asha Sharath as Geetha Prabhakar, former Inspector general of police; Varun's mother
- Siddique as Prabhakar, Varun's father
- Murali Gopy as IG Thomas Bastin IPS
- Saikumar as Vinayachandran, a screenwriter
- K. B. Ganesh Kumar as CI Phillip Mathew
- Anjali Nair as Saritha, Georgekutty's neighbour; an undercover police officer
- Sumesh Chandran as Sabu, Saritha's husband; an undercover police officer
- Ajith Koothattukulam as Jose George, an ex-convict sentenced for murder
- Dinesh Prabhakar as Rajan, a medical college security guard
- Antony Perumbavoor as SI Antony
- Santhi Mayadevi as Advocate Renuka, Georgekutty's lawyer
- Kozhikode Narayanan Nair as Sulaiman
- Aneesh G. Menon as Rajesh, Rani's brother
- Shobha Mohan as Rani's mother
- Krishna Prabha as Mary, Jose's wife
- Pauly Valsan as Jose's mother
- Boban Samuel as DySP Raghuram
- Krishna as Forensic Surgeon
- Joy Mathew as Public Prosecutor Janardhanan
- Adam Ayub as Judge of District Court
- Murali Kannur as DGP Jayakrishnan
- Mela Raghu as Reghu
- Jayashankar as Pathrose
- Ranjini George as Dr. Ranjini, Anju's doctor
- Rajesh Paravoor as Tehsildar
- Arfaz Ayub as Forensic Assistant

== Production ==
=== Development ===
Jeethu Joseph and Mohanlal were filming for Ram prior to the COVID-19 lockdown in India, however the shooting of the film was stalled as some sequences they want to film in foreign locations, such as London and Cairo. As the crew realised that the filming would take time to continue, Jeethu decided to start the works for Drishyam 2, a sequel to their 2013 film Drishyam which he had plans for some time. As the shooting of the film would only take place in Kerala, Jeethu realised it was most appropriate film to shoot after the lockdown ends. The film was officially announced by Mohanlal on his 60th birthday on 21 May 2020. It was intended to start filming soon after the government allows permission to begin film shootings. Mohanlal said during an interview that he has read the script, and shooting might begin after lockdown. Antony Perumbavoor who produced Drishyam returns as the producer. Jeethu said that it is a direct continuation of the last film and for that he has retained the principal characters along with some new additions in the secondary cast. In the turn of events, Georgekutty and his family now leads an affluent life and Georgekutty has opened a cinema theatre and is also planning to produce a film.

=== Filming ===
Principal photography began on 21 September 2020 in Kochi. It was conducted adhering to the safety precautions set for preventing COVID-19 spread. Indoor scenes were shot there. Filming was held in Kakkanad, Kochi. It was shifted to Thodupuzha after two weeks. The same house in Vazhithala featured as Georegekutty and family's residence in Drishyam was used as the location for Drishyam 2, reportedly, an 18-day shoot was charted at the house. The house was renovated to reflect Georgekutty's present-day prosperity. Filming was also held at some other houses in Thodupuzha, and was also shot at nearby areas such as Kanjar and Arakkulam.

A set was constructed at Kaipa Kavala in Kudayathoor where Drishyam was filmed. An entire street was erected at the place, including Rajakkadu Police Station, Georgekutty's cable TV shop, and surrounding stores and structures, which was one of the main locations. Rajeev Kovilakathu was the art director. Following the portions at Kaipa Kavala, filming was concluded on 6 November 2020. The entire filming, which was scheduled to last for 56 days was completed in 46 days. A special team was designated to observe the film crew, including the director, were abiding the COVID-19 protocol.

== Music ==
The songs and the film score were composed by Anil Johnson, with lyrics by Vinayak Sasikumar. The music album consists of only one song titled "Ore Pakal" which was recorded by Zonobia Safar, and was released on 10 February 2021 by Saina Music.

Track listing
| No. | Title | Music | Singer(s) | Length |
|---|---|---|---|---|
| 1. | "Ore Pakal" | Anil Johnson | Zonobia Safar | 04:33 |

== Marketing and release ==
Director Jeethu Joseph stated the plans for a theatrical release on 22 January 2021 before Mohanlal's big-budget film Marakkar: Lion of the Arabian Sea, citing that it is served to be a "litmus test in getting the audience back when theatres reopen". However, as the Kerala Film Chamber decided against reopening theatres since they demanded relief package from the government as theatre business took a severe hit following the coronavirus-induced lockdown and full exemption from entertainment tax, plans for the theatrical release had interrupted and the team opted for the digital streaming platform Amazon Prime Video to distribute the film. A teaser released on the occasion of New Year's Day, confirmed that it will release in Amazon Prime Video.

The film's official trailer was supposed to be unveiled on 8 February 2021, however on 6 February (two days before the trailer release), the trailer was leaked online which resulted the team to release the trailer officially on the same day, also announcing the release date of 19 February 2021. However, Drishyam 2 was released worldwide on the midnight of 18 February 2021, and was made available for streaming in over 240 countries.

The move for direct-to-digital release of Drishyam 2 met with criticism from theatre owners and distributors, with Liberty Basheer president of Kerala Film Exhibitors Federations, opined that "a prominent actor-like Mohanlal accepting this, is a selfish act" and opined that the film will easily bring "huge audience to movie theatres, being the sequel to one of the most successful films in the last decade". However, few trade analysts and members from the film circuit supported that "it is due to Anthony Perumbavoor's (the film producer) financial constraints. He had paid advance from theatre owners to screen Marakkar: Lion of the Arabian Sea, since it is a huge film and made for theatrical experience. But he did not pay advance from Drishyam 2, which is why he accepted for a digital release." In an online interaction with fans, prior to the film's release, Mohanlal stated that there are possibilities for a theatrical re-release. However, Kerala Film Chamber denied the producer's request for theatrical release of Drishyam 2 stating that they would not violate the guidelines by releasing a film in theatres, which is speculated for an online platform release.

The film had a limited theatrical release in GCC countries from 1 July 2021, post its digital release.

== Reception ==
=== Critical response ===
On the review aggregator website Rotten Tomatoes, 88% of 8 critics' reviews are positive, with an average rating of 7.5/10.

Aishwarya Vasudevan of the Daily News and Analysis gave a 4 out of 5 star rating and wrote, "Drishyam 2 is a gripping tale of an investigation and a family which is threatened by it, is a must-watch sequel we didn't know we deserved and the film will make you think for hours after you completed watching it".

Sanjith Sidhardhan of The Times of India gave a 4 out of 5 star rating, and stated "Jeethu's script for the sequel is tight as ever; like Drishyam ... the film is an expertly crafted sequel meant for the audience to enjoy and the team to be proud of", and also praised Mohanlal's acting.

Haricharan Pudippedi of Hindustan Times wrote that "It's no exaggeration to call Drishyam 2 one of the best sequels ever", it is "a thoroughly gripping and entertaining sequel, a rare occurrence in Indian cinema. Powered by top class writing and plenty of unexpected twists, the sequel packs a solid punch and makes for a riveting watch right till the end. Drishyam 2 is a masterclass in suspense building and it works as effectively as the first part if not better".

Rating 4 out of 5 stars, Sowmya Rajendran of The News Minute said that this "thriller is a superb sequel ... looking at the strength of the writing, it looks like in Jeethu's mind, Drishyam was always supposed to be two films".

Rating 4 out of 5 stars, Suresh Mathew of The Quint said that "Mohanlal's gripping thriller is a winner again ... unlike the original, Drishyam 2 grips you from the very start ... Drishyam 2 is a worthy contender to the original. It grabs your attention from the word go and entertains you throughout its two-and-a-half-hour duration", he also praised Mohanlal's acting.

Anna M. M. Vetticad of Firstpost called it "a surprisingly satisfying sequel to a spectacular first film ... Drishyam 2 is clever in the way it smoothly slips back into the world of Drishyam ... it now feels as if Part 1 is incomplete without Part 2".

Janaki K. of India Today called it "a fitting sequel to Drishyam" and stated "Jeethu Joseph’s staging and strengths to work on a solid script are the film’s assets ... Mohanlal is just excellent", rating 3.5 out of 5 stars.

Baradwaj Rangan of Film Companion called it a "solid sequel, which swaps tension with existentialism", with a "superb structure. Like Part 1, this is more a writer’s film than a director’s film", he praised the writing – "it’s basic exposition, scene after scene" and "the writing during the climactic portions treats Part 1/Part 2 of Drishyam as two halves of the same story. It’s a brilliant meta touch ... the film is at its best when we look at Part 1/Part 2 as one unified universe".

Tina Sara Anien of Deccan Herald rated 4 out of 5 stars, calling it "a thrilling, befitting sequel" and that "Drishyam 2 quashes the notion that sequels lack the magic of the originals ... not many thrillers have succeeded to impress an audience by intensifying the original's plot and that's the clinching proof of this film's special quality".

Sajin Shrijith of The New Indian Express also rated 4 in a scale of 5, describing it as "a richer, expansive, and far superior sequel ... successful sequels are a rarity, and rarer still is a sequel that surpasses the original. Drishyam 2 is one such".

Rating 4 out of 5 stars, Sify critic said "It is not always that a sequel lives up to the huge expectations of the highly successful original. Drishyam 2 does that in a brilliant way ... with an engaging script, Jeethu Joseph has presented the sequel in a gripping manner".

Joginder Tuteja of Rediff.com said that "this Mohanlal suspense drama may well go down as yet another modern day classic ... this is a true sequel to Drishyam and is, in fact, the first ever suspense thriller to move from the first to the second part with a seamless ease", he rated 3.5 out of 5.

Gautaman Bhaskaran of News18 wrote that "Mohanlal returns with more vigour and charisma ... Georgekutty is not a man to be cowed down, and the rest of the movie is an exciting game of how he foxes the cops and saves his family. The twist, in the end, is simply superb", he rated 3 out of 5 stars.

Vipin Vijayan of Asianet News rated 4 out of 5 and called it a "perfect sequel" and that its "a must-watch for the sheer brilliance of Georgekutty aka Mohanlal and the marvellous script of Jeethu Joseph".

Saibal Chatterjee of NDTV gave a 2.5 out of 5 stars and wrote, "Mohanlal is flawless yet again ... in terms of structure and rhythm, writer-director Jeethu Joseph follows pretty much the arc of the original film", but felt "the writing could have done with more punch".

S. R. Praveen of The Hindu opined, "Drishyam 2 might not work as a stand-alone film — as many sequels do — since it is completely dependent on the first film with constant references. But despite its negatives, it still is a decent companion piece to its much celebrated predecessor".

However, Nirmal Narayanan of IB Times felt that it "failed to match the cinematic making quality of its prequel [sic]... the first half of the movie had its originality, but the second half of the film was a pure letdown, as it questioned the thinking capability", but he praised Mohanlal's acting.

== Sequel ==
After the release of Drishyam 2, producer Antony Perumbavoor commented that it is possible for a third film in the series, although Jeethu had neither confirmed nor denied it. Antony also said that Jeethu is researching on possible story arcs for Drishyam 3, and there had been discussions with Mohanlal. On 23 February 2021, Jeethu said in a press conference that he currently has figured out the climax for Drishyam 3, but the screenplay and production may take at least three years to materialise. On 20 February 2025, Drishyam 3 was officially announced. Drishyam 3 was released on 21 May 2026.

== Remakes ==
The film was remade in Kannada as Drishya 2 and Telugu as Drushyam 2, both released in 2021. The Hindi remake of the same name was released in 2022. A Sinhalese remake titled Dharmayuddhaya 2 was released in 2026.

| Year | Title | Language | Director | Cast |
|---|---|---|---|---|
| 2021 | Drushyam 2 | Telugu | Jeethu Joseph | Venkatesh, Meena, Nadhiya, Sampath Raj |
| 2021 | Drishya 2 | Kannada | P. Vasu | Ravichandran, Navya Nair, Asha Sharath, Pramod Shetty |
| 2022 | Drishyam 2 | Hindi | Abhishek Pathak | Ajay Devgn, Akshaye Khanna, Tabu, Shriya Saran |
| 2026 | Dharmayuddhaya 2 | Sinhala | Aruna Jayawardana | Bimal Jayakody, Dilhani Ekanayake, Kusum Renu, Ashan Dias |
