= Satheesh Kurup =

Indian cinematographer (born 1981)

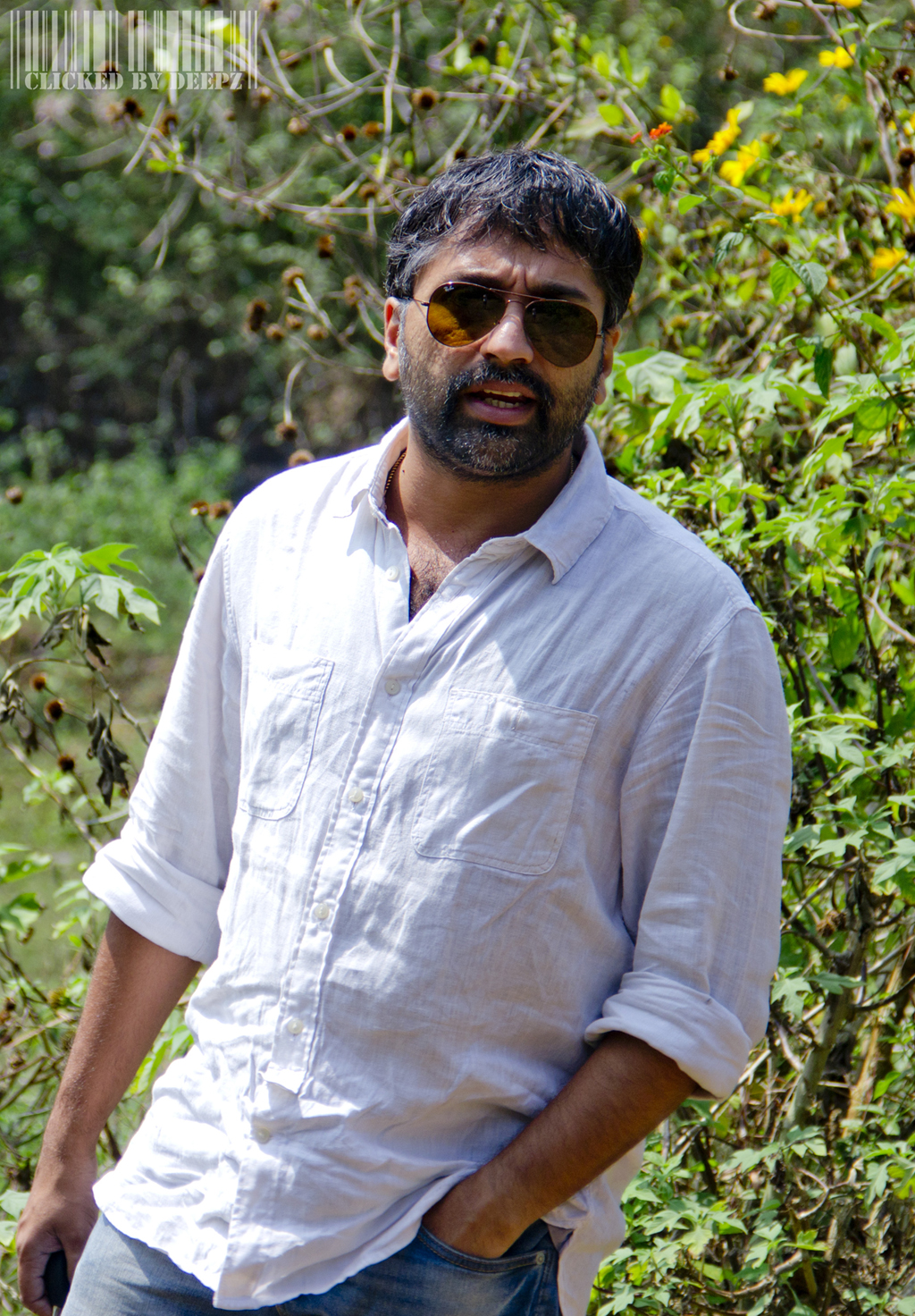
- Born: 7 November 1981 (age 44); Changanassery, Kerala, India
- Occupation: Cinematographer
- Years active: 2010 – present

Satheesh Kurup (born 7 November 1981) is an Indian cinematographer who works in Malayalam cinema.

== Career ==
Satheesh made his debut with Anwar (2010). His well-known films include Pranayam (2011), Jawan of Vellimala (2012), Kalimannu (2013), Ladies and Gentleman (2013), Salala Mobiles (2014), Mr. Fraud (2014), and Haram (2015). He was an assistant cinematographer to Jibu Jacob and Amal Neerad.

== Filmography ==
Year	Title	Language	Notes	Ref.
2010	Anwar	Malayalam		
2011	Pranayam	Malayalam		
2012	Jawan of Vellimala	Malayalam		
2012	I Love Me	Malayalam		
2013	Ladies and Gentleman	Malayalam		
2013	Kalimannu	Malayalam		
2014	Salalah Mobiles	Malayalam		
2014	Mr. Fraud	Malayalam		
2015	Haram	Malayalam		
2016	Pa Va	Malayalam		
2016	Undo Thinkforth	Hindi	Short film	
2016	Ore Mukham	Malayalam		
2016	100 Years of Chrysostom	Malayalam	Documentary	
2017	Tiyaan	Malayalam		
2017	Alamara	Malayalam		
2018	Aadhi	Malayalam		
2018	Padayottam	Malayalam		
2019	Mr. & Ms. Rowdy	Malayalam		
2019	The Body	Hindi	Remake of The Body	
2021	Drishyam 2	Malayalam		
2021	Drushyam 2	Telugu	Remake of Drishyam 2	
2022	12th Man	Malayalam		
2022	Monster	Malayalam		
2022	Kooman	Malayalam		
2023	Neru	Malayalam		
2024	Nunakkuzhi	Malayalam		
2025	Mirage	Malayalam		
2026	Valathu Vashathe Kallan	Malayalam		
2026	Drishyam 3	Malayalam		
