= Drushyam 2 =

2021 Indian Telugu film by Jeethu Joseph

- Official release poster
- Directed by: Jeethu Joseph
- Written by: Jeethu Joseph
- Dialogues by: Ramesh Samala
- Based on: Drishyam 2 by Jeethu Joseph
- Produced by: D. Suresh Babu; Antony Perumbavoor; Rajkumar Sethupathi
- Starring: Venkatesh; Meena; Kruthika Jayakumar; Esther Anil; Nadhiya; Sampath Raj
- Cinematography: Satheesh Kurup
- Edited by: Marthand K. Venkatesh
- Music by: Anup Rubens; Anil Johnson
- Production companies: Suresh Productions; Aashirvad Cinemas; Rajkumar Theatres Pvt. Ltd.
- Distributed by: Amazon Prime Video
- Release date: 25 November 2021
- Running time: 154 minutes
- Country: India
- Language: Telugu

Drushyam 2 (transl. Visual 2) is a 2021 Indian Telugu-language crime drama film written and directed by Jeethu Joseph. It is a remake of his 2021 Malayalam film Drishyam 2 and sequel to Drushyam (2014). The film was jointly produced by D. Suresh Babu, Antony Perumbavoor, and Rajkumar Sethupathi under Suresh Productions, Aashirvad Cinemas, and Rajkumar Theatres. It stars Venkatesh, Meena, Kruthika Jayakumar, Esther Anil, Nadhiya, and Sampath Raj. The story takes place six years after the events of Drushyam.

Drushyam 2 was released on Amazon Prime Video on 25 November 2021. It was dubbed in Hindi as Aankhen 2 in 2023 through the distribution company Goldmines Telefilms.

== Plot ==
On the night of 3 August 2014, Janardhan sees Rambabu exiting an under-construction police station (burying Varun's body at the end of Drushyam) as he flees from the authorities after murdering his brother-in-law. He attempts to apologize to his wife and hide at their home but gets arrested.

Six years later, Rambabu, Jyothi, Anju, and Anu are living semi-normally. After selling some land, Rambabu now owns a movie theatre and is producing a film of his own with renowned screenwriter Vinaya Chandra. Anju has PTSD and seizures from her experience with the police. Jealous of Rambabu's wealth, the rest of the village claims Anju led Varun on and gossips about Rambabu and his family. Feeling isolated from the rest of her family, Jyothi forms a sister-like bond with her new neighbor Saritha, a government clerk, who is often abused by her alcoholic husband Sanjay, a real estate broker.

On the anniversary of Varun's death, Prabhakar, Varun's father, begs Rambabu to give him his son's remains to conduct the final rites to console Geetha, but Rambabu refuses, enraging her. Meanwhile, Anu comes home over break and invites her friends for a sleepover despite Jyothi's objections. With Rambabu remaining aloof to her concerns, Jyothi spends more time with Saritha and inadvertently discloses that Anju killed Varun. Unbeknownst to her, Sanjay and Saritha are undercover cops assigned by Geetha's friend inspector general of police N. Gowtham Sahu, who wants to avenge Geetha and the embarrassment the case has caused the police, and they had bugged the house. Meanwhile, Janardhan is released from prison and sets out to earn for and restore relations with his estranged wife. After learning about Rambabu's case and a potential reward, he goes to Gowtham to get the money, which Geetha and Prabhakar give him. Janardhan divulges what he saw, leading to the authorities excavating the station floor and discovering a skeleton. Rambabu, seeing this through CCTV cameras he had installed around the station, prepares for the worst.

Gowtham, Geetha, and Prabhakar summon Rambabu's family for more questioning, but they maintain their alibi. However, Geetha plays a recording of Jyothi's confession to Sarita, defeating them. An enraged Geetha probes Anju about the case and triggers her fits. Desperate, Rambabu falsely confesses to Gowtham that he murdered Varun. With the police satisfied, the family is released, but Gowtham plots to trap them all later. The next day, the police formally arrest Rambabu and place him on trial for Varun's murder. Having learned about this, Chandra goes to Gowtham, Geetha, and Prabhakar and reveals Rambabu had written a movie script loosely based on the case and then published it as a novel under Chandra's name, titled Drushyam, to give the story copyright protection. Rambabu pleads not guilty and claims that the police used scenes from Drushyam as the basis of a forced confession, making them realize it was part of his scheme. Furthermore, the DNA tests reveal that the body isn't Varun's, to everyone's shock. Chandra reveals that Rambabu had created a different climax for his film: knowing his initial plan might fail, the hero immediately procures the remains of another young man who died of similar injuries by befriending the undertaker of the cemetery where the other body is buried. He keeps those remains for three years before befriending a security guard at the local morgue by promising him a role in the film. The night after the original body arrives at the morgue, the hero switches them before DNA samples are collected and secretly burns the original body.

Rambabu is released on bail due to lack of evidence and the police are temporarily prohibited from bothering the family. The judge calls Gowtham to his chambers and tells him to stop pursuing the case, disclosing that unsolved cases "are not new to the system", just as Rambabu leaves the court as Sanjay and Saritha watch in disbelief. Outside the courthouse, Chandra narrates the end of Rambabu's alternate climax to Geetha and Prabhakar - the hero would discreetly transfer the ashes to his bereaved parents and live with his sins. Simultaneously, Rambabu sends Varun's ashes anonymously to Geetha and Prabhakar with a message requesting they stop hounding his family. As Varun's father conducts the last rite, Gowtham convinces Geetha to let go of her enmity, concluding that they will never win as Rambabu will do anything to protect his family. Gowtham also states that Rambabu's life is punishment - he has to live in fear and always be prepared to evade the justice system. Rambabu, who was watching the proceedings from afar, solemnly leaves.

== Cast ==
- Venkatesh as Rambabu, a movie theatre owner and aspiring film producer
- Meena as Jyothi, Rambabu's wife; Anju and Anu's mother
- Kruthika Jayakumar as Anju, Rambabu and Jyoti's elder daughter
- Esther Anil as Anu, Rambabu and Jyoti's younger daughter
- Nadhiya as Geetha Prabhakar, Varun's mother; former Inspector-general of police
- Sampath Raj as IG N. Goutham Sahu IPS
- Naresh as Prabhakar, Geetha's husband and Varun's father
- Tanikella Bharani as Vinay Chandra, a screenwriter
- Vinay Varma as CI J. Prathap, a member of Goutham's investigation team
- Suja Varunee as Saritha, Rambabu's neighbour; an undercover cop and member of Goutham's investigation team
- Satyam Rajesh as Sanjay, Saritha's husband; an undercover cop and member of Goutham's investigation team
- Shafi as Janardhan, an ex-convict jailed for murder
- Poorna as Advocate Renuka, Rambabu's lawyer
- Annapurna as Jyothi's mother
- Chammak Chandra as Raju, a watchman
- Rajshri Nair as Doctor
- Sirisha as Latha, Janardhan's wife
- Gautam Raju as Somaraju
- Naidu Gopi as Hotel Babai
- Sammeta Gandhi as Peter, a gravedigger whom Rambabu's befriends
- Tammareddy Bharadwaja as DGP
- Raja Ravindra as DySP
- C. V. L. Narasimha Rao as Public Prosecutor Janardhan
- Adam Ayub as Judge of District Court

== Production ==
Following the success of Drishyam 2 in February 2021, director Jeethu Joseph announced its Telugu remake, serving as the sequel to Drushyam (2014) which would be directed by himself. The film was formally launched on 1 March 2021 with a puja ceremony in Hyderabad. The film was jointly produced by D. Suresh Babu under Suresh Productions, Antony Perumbavoor under Aashirvad Cinemas, and Rajkumar Sethupathi under Rajkumar Theatres.

Venkatesh, Meena, Nadhiya, Naresh, Kruthika Jayakumar, and Esther Anil were confirmed to reprise their roles from Drushyam. Poorna was cast in an undisclosed role. Sampath Raj was cast in the role portrayed by Murali Gopy in the original.

Principal photography commenced on 5 March 2021 in Hyderabad with Venkatesh on the sets. Meena joined the production on 16 March. The final shooting schedule took place in Kerala. Filming wrapped in April 2021, after 50 days of shoot. The cinematography was handled by Satheesh Kurup.

== Music ==
The music for the film was composed by Anup Rubens, with lyrics written by Chandrabose. The album features one song "Inka Ennaallu" sung by Shreya Ghoshal which was released on 22 November 2021 by Suresh Productions Music.

Track list
No.	Title	Lyrics	Singer(s)	Length
1.	"Inka Ennaallu"	Chandrabose	Shreya Ghoshal	2:54

== Release ==
In May 2021, owing to the COVID-19 pandemic, the makers planned a direct OTT release for the film just like the original Malayalam film. It premiered on Amazon Prime Video on 25 November 2021.

== Reception ==
Sangeetha Devi Dundoo of The Hindu praised Jeetu's work and also the actors' work by stating: "With the remake remaining unflinchingly loyal to the original, the onus to make it worthwhile for those who know the story, falls on the shoulders of the actors." Neeshita Nyayapati of The Times of India gave a rating of 3.5 out of 5 and cited as a "worthy sequel" to a "stellar film". She further praised film's direction, acting by the ensemble cast, cinematography, screenplay and the film score.
