= Kooman (film) =

2022 Indian thriller film directed by Jeethu Joseph

- Theatrical release poster
- Directed by: Jeethu Joseph
- Written by: K. R. Krishna Kumar
- Produced by: Listin Stephen; Allwin Antony
- Starring: Asif Ali; Renji Panicker; Hannah Reji Koshy; Jaffar Idukki; Baburaj
- Cinematography: Satheesh Kurup
- Edited by: V. S. Vinayak
- Music by: Vishnu Shyam
- Production companies: Magic Frames; Ananya Films
- Distributed by: Magic Frames
- Release date: 4 November 2022
- Running time: 153 minutes
- Country: India
- Language: Malayalam

Kooman (transl. Owl) is a 2022 Indian Malayalam-language crime thriller film directed by Jeethu Joseph, written by K. R. Krishna Kumar and jointly produced by Listin Stephen and Allwin Antony. The film stars Asif Ali, with Renji Panicker, Jaffar Idukki, Baburaj, Hannah Reji Koshy, and Meghanathan. The plot follows Giri Shankar, a C.P.O. disregarded by his colleagues and looked upon with contempt by his villagers. As he takes revenge for a humiliating incident, his life turns upside down. The original background score was composed by Vishnu Shyam.

Principal photography began in February 2022. Kooman was released in theatres on 4 November 2022 to critical acclaim from critics and audiences. The film was a commercial success at the box office.

== Plot ==
Giri Shankar is a young CPO stationed at a village police station in Kerala. Although he is highly observant, which has enabled him to solve several mysterious cases, he is egotistical and tries to win anything he considers a challenge. After his senior officer, Circle Inspector (CI) Pillai, retires, the new CI, Harilal, takes over and treats Giri harshly, frequently humiliating him.

To avenge Harilal’s humiliation, Giri decides to commit a series of thefts in the village to embarrass him. Using techniques he learned from Mani, a habitual thief he recently got to know, Giri successfully breaks into two houses and steals some money without leaving any clues. Unable to identify the thief, Harilal comes under pressure as the villagers lose faith in his ability to maintain law and order. During the investigation, Giri intentionally misleads Harilal, which results in a mess and Harilal's suspension.

Giri subsequently develops kleptomania, and his poor impulse control makes the compulsion to steal increasingly difficult to manage. He particularly targets people who challenge him, such as those who boast that their homes are secure or vow to catch him in the act if he dares to rob them. However, Giri keeps none of the stolen money for himself, instead distributing it anonymously among poor people.

One day, a villager named Ramesh boasts that he has bought a dog to guard his house and deter the thief. Taking this as a personal challenge, Giri breaks into Ramesh’s house a few days later. Ramesh catches him in the act, but Giri escapes in a panic. The following day, prepared to face the consequences, Giri is shocked to learn that Ramesh has been found hanged. Ramesh never had the opportunity to tell anyone that he had caught Giri stealing from his house.

The police presume that Ramesh died by suicide, but Giri grows suspicious after noticing tyre marks at the site where the body was found. He discovers similar marks outside Ramesh’s house and remembers seeing a van there while escaping after being caught. Unable to share his observations with the police without exposing his own thefts, Giri approaches the former CI Pillai, confesses his criminal activities, and asks for help investigating Ramesh’s death. Although disappointed to learn what Giri has become, Pillai agrees to help and enlists Kumar, a police officer loyal to him. Kumar agrees to investigate the killing alongside Giri while keeping Giri’s thefts confidential.

Giri subsequently receives a video from an unknown number showing him being caught by Ramesh and fleeing the house. The camera angle suggests that the footage was recorded by someone inside the van Giri noticed that night. Giri traces the phone number to a villager from another village and visits the address, only to discover that the owner died several months earlier. To Giri’s shock, the villager’s death closely resembles Ramesh’s: the victim was found hanging at night, with no suicide note, and the same type of rope was used in both cases.

Suspecting a serial killer, Giri examines the case files of people found dead by hanging in neighbouring villages over the previous year. He discovers several more deaths with the same characteristics: the victims were found hanging at night, no suicide notes were recovered, and identical rope was used in each case.

Giri then receives another video from an unknown number. It contains further footage of his thefts and warns him to abandon the investigation or the recordings will be made public. Unable to identify the sender, Giri decides to continue investigating, treating the threat as another challenge.

As he searches for more common patterns among the deaths, Giri eventually notices that they all occurred on new moon nights, suggesting a possible religious motive. He recalls a note in one victim’s case file that appears to be a prescription for a Hindu puja. He consults several Hindu priests, who explain that the note describes a sinister ritual associated with black magic, which treats human death as a sacrifice for immortality. According to their account, the ritual was once performed by black magicians at a remote temple that was destroyed in a landslide.

While recording the priests’ phone numbers for future enquiries, Giri notices that the number used to send him the second threatening video belongs to a priest named Durai. Durai quickly denies that the number is his, which makes Giri suspicious of him, and Durai notices this.

On the night of the next new moon, Giri learns that his young neighbour Lakshimi has been taken away by Durai to perform a puja. Suspecting that she will become the next victim, Giri rushes to intervene. He reaches the site of the destroyed temple and discovers a cave nearby. Inside, he finds Durai performing rituals after tying a rope around Lakshimi’s neck. Giri frees her but is attacked by Durai and knocked unconscious.

When Giri regains consciousness, he finds himself restrained, with a rope around his neck. To his shock, Lakshimi is helping Durai perform the rituals. Durai reveals that Lakshimi is transgender and that he regards her as a rare offering for the black magic rituals. He has been brainwashing her since childhood and turning her into a pawn in his killings. Durai killed all the villagers in the hanging cases in the name of seeking immortality for them. Giri manages to free himself and fights Durai, and in the ensuing violent confrontation, he kills him.

Several months later, Lakshimi has returned to normal life after undergoing rehabilitation. Giri receives an invitation to join the Crime Branch. However, he is shown to continue committing thefts because of his addiction.

== Cast ==
- Asif Ali as CPO Giri Shankar
- Renji Panicker as Rtd. CI Soman Pillai
- Hannah Reji Koshy as Lakshmi Manoharan
- Jaffar Idukki as Maniyan
- Baburaj as CI Harilal Dev
- Meghanathan as SI Sukumaran Nair
- Baiju Santhosh as Thampi
- Nandhu as Subbayya Swami
- Pauly Valsan as Giri's mother
- Rajesh Paravoor as Manoharan, Lakshmi's father
- Karate Karthi as Karuppu Durai
- Adam Ayub as Acharyan
- Rifa as Dexter
- Abhiram Radhakrishnan as CPO Vinod
- Deepak Parambol as Suresh
- Jayan Cherthala as DYSP Prem Kumar
- Vinod Bose as CPO Subhash
- Prasant Murali as CPO Chandran
- Riyas Narmakala as Balan Pillai, Tea Shop Owner
- T. G. Ravi as Forest Ranger (Rtd.)
- George Maryan as Tamil Nadu CI Ramakrishamoorthy
- Ramesh Thilak as Tamil Nadu CPO Senthil Kumar
- Parasparam Pradeep as CPO Rasheed
- Sundarapandiyan as Shaji, Thampi's assistant
- Sriya Nath as CPO Rani
- Femina Nelson as CPO Shiny
- Krishna as Lakshmi's mother
- Unni Chittoor as Ramaswami
- Anoop Menon as Psychiatrist Sandeep Mathew (cameo appearance)

== Production ==
=== Development ===
Kooman was announced on 2 February 2022 with a title motion poster poster. Jeethu Joseph described it as a thriller.

=== Filming ===
The makers started the principal photography on 24 February 2022 with the switch-on ceremony. It took 32 days to complete the shoot. The post-production of the film started in March and Jeethu Joseph himself announced the release date when the promotions for the film were ongoing.

== Release ==
The film was released on 4 November 2022. The official trailer of the film was released on 27 October 2022. The film received positive reviews.

== Reception ==
=== Critical response ===
S.R. Praveen of The Hindu wrote, The investigative thriller might be director Jeethu Joseph's most comfortable space, but what keeps the interest alive is the main thread related to the vengeful character essayed masterfully by Asif Ali.

Shajin Shrijith of The New Indian Express wrote, Kooman, too, similarly exercises your brain. Considering what happens to Giri's career in the climax, I wish he would appear in the next Drishyam film.

== Music ==
The original background score and songs were composed by Vishnu Shyam.

No.	Title	Lyrics	Singer(s)	Length
1.	"Irulkkannumay"	Vinayak Sasikumar	Vishnu Shyam	3:57
