= The Body (2019 film) =

2019 Indian film directed by Jeethu Joseph

- Theatrical release poster
- Directed by: Jeethu Joseph
- Written by: Jeethu Joseph
- Based on: The Body by Oriol Paulo
- Produced by: Sunir Kheterpal
- Starring: Rishi Kapoor; Emraan Hashmi; Vedhika; Sobhita Dhulipala
- Cinematography: Satheesh Kurup
- Edited by: Ayoob Khan
- Music by: Songs: Shamir Tandon; Arko; Tanishk Bagchi; Score: Clinton Cerejo
- Production companies: Viacom 18 Studios; Azure Entertainment
- Distributed by: Viacom18 Motion Pictures
- Release date: 13 December 2019
- Running time: 100 minutes
- Country: India
- Language: Hindi
- Box office: ₹3.47 crore

The Body is a 2019 Indian Hindi-language mystery thriller written and directed by Jeethu Joseph. The film stars Rishi Kapoor, Emraan Hashmi, Vedhika, and Sobhita Dhulipala. It is a remake of the 2012 Spanish film of the same name.

The film was released on 13 December 2019. It marked the final film appearance of Kapoor prior to his death.

== Plot ==
The dead body of a powerful businesswoman named Maya Verma, who died because of a heart attack, disappeared from the morgue before the autopsy. SP Jairaj Rawal calls in Maya's husband, Ajay Puri, for investigation. Ajay Puri, who is the owner of a lab and worked under Maya's company seemed to have committed something wrong along with his girlfriend Ritu.

Jairaj suspects Ajay and makes him stay in the morgue until Maya's corpse is found. Strange incidents start to happen with Ajay. He feels Maya's presence around him and gradually gets clues including the bottle of toxin (TH-16) which he had used to induce a heart attack in Maya's body and also gets a phone in another corpse's bag having the calls only from Maya. All these events make him believe that Maya is still alive and is playing a game with him to take her revenge.

In a flashback, it is shown that Maya always used to dominate Ajay with her money and power. Ajay's possessiveness and his affair with Ritu made him kill Maya and made it look like a heart attack by using a cardiotoxin which takes about 8 hours to work. In the morgue, Ajay continuously keeps contact with Ritu and they find out that Maya knew about their relationship by hiring a private detective named Tony D'Costa. Ajay tells Ritu to run away to a safe place as he feels that Maya is after her. When Ajay fails to contact Ritu, he confesses everything to Jairaj out of fear and requests him to save Ritu from Maya. In the meantime, Jairaj gets a call from his team that they have found a female corpse which is revealed to be Maya's. When Jairaj orders the police to arrest Ajay, he tries to run away but falls down due to chest pain.

Finally, it is revealed that Ritu is none other than Jairaj's daughter Isha. Everything that has happened to Maya and Ajay since the last night was their plan. Yet again, in a flashback, it is revealed that Jairaj's wife Nancy, who died in a car accident, was hit by a drunk Maya and Ajay, who, instead of helping them, returned to the crime scene and hit the car again as Ajay had noticed that the little girl sitting on the back seat had seen them. After 10 years, when Isha recognizes Ajay and Maya in her university, she plans revenge along with her father. Isha attracts Ajay towards her and starts an affair.

In the end, Jairaj discloses to Ajay that he is going to have a heart attack from the cardiotoxin that he had used to kill Maya, which Ritu (Isha) had mixed in his drink 8 hours ago.

== Cast ==
- Rishi Kapoor as SP Jairaj Rawal IPS (The investigating officer of Maya's case)
- Emraan Hashmi as Ajay Puri (Maya's husband and Ritu's love interest)
- Sobhita Dhulipala as Maya Varma, Ajay's wife and a rich and powerful businesswoman
- Vedhika as Ritu Jha (fake name) / Isha Rawal, Jairaj's daughter (voice dubbed by Sonal Kaushal)
  - Meenakshi Anoop as Little Isha
- Arif Zakaria as Mohammed Shekhawat
- Rukhsar Rehman as Dr. Tanya Mehra
- Anupam Bhattacharya as Pawan Sinha
- Tara Singh as Morgue's security guard
- Chandan K Anand as Keith Suliman
- Nataša Stanković (Special appearance in the song "Jhalak Dikhla Jaa Reloaded")
- Scarlet Mellish Wilson (Special appearance in the song "Jhalak Dikhla Jaa Reloaded")

== Soundtrack ==
The Body

Soundtrack album by Shamir Tandon, Arko and Tanishk Bagchi
- Released: 13 December 2019
- Recorded: 2019
- Genre: Feature film soundtrack
- Length: 28:00
- Language: Hindi
- Label: T-Series
External audio
- Official Audio Jukebox on YouTube

The soundtrack for the film was composed by Shamir Tandon, Arko and Tanishk Bagchi with the lyrics written by Arko, Kumaar, Manoj Muntashir and Sameer Anjaan. The song "Jhalak Dikhlaja Reloaded" is a remake of the song ''Jhalak Dikhlaja'', originally composed by Himesh Reshammiya for the film Aksar, which was recreated by Bagchi.

Track listing
No.	Title	Lyrics	Music	Singer(s)	Length
1.	"Aaina"	Arko	Arko	Arko, Tulsi Kumar, Neha Kakkar	4:12
2.	"Main Janta Hoon"	Sameer	Shamir Tandon	Jubin Nautiyal	4:17
3.	"Jhalak Dikhlaja Reloaded"	Sameer	Tanishk Bagchi	Himesh Reshammiya	2:28
4.	"Khuda Haafiz"	Manoj Muntashir	Arko	Arijit Singh	4:46
5.	"Rom Rom"	Sameer	Shamir Tandon	Sunny Hindustani	3:40
6.	"Itna Pyaar Karo"	Kumaar	Shamir Tandon	Shreya Ghoshal	4:57
7.	"Rom Rom" (Version 2)	Sameer	Shamir Tandon	Altamash Faridi	3:40
Total length:					28:00

== Reception ==
=== Critical reception ===
Pallabi Dey Purkayastha of The Times of India gave the film, a rating of 2.5 out of 5 and wrote "The Body is low on content and high on glamour. There is not much to unravel in this one." Hindustan Times wrote "As the series of events unfold, you’re shown flashbacks which are, each time, topped with a romantic song. Even though they’re shot at the most picturesque locales and look pretty, they totally take you away from the story." Saibal Chatterjee of NDTV gave 2 out of 5 and wrote "The Body has no scope for Bollywood-style romance but it insists on banking on plenty of it framed against the picturesque backdrops on offer in the Indian Ocean nation where the story is set." Criticizing the plot and performances, Shubhra Gupta of Indian Express stated "Everything in it is flat: the plot, the performers, the alleged twists. And that must have taken some doing, given that the filmmakers had a ready-made plot to dip into." Filmfare wrote "What could have been a short film for a digital platform has unnecessarily been stretched as a feature. Weak writing, flawed editing and a disinterested cast doesn't help its prospects..."
