= Antony Perumbavoor =

Indian film producer

- Born: M. J. Antony; 25 May 1968 (age 58); Perumbavoor, Kerala, India
- Occupations: Film producer; film distributor; film exhibitor; actor
- Years active: 1987–present
- Spouse: Santhy Antony
- Children: 2 (inlcuding Aashish Joe Antony)

Malekudy Joseph Antony (born 25 May 1968), professionally known as Antony Perumbavoor, is an Indian film producer, distributor, and cinema exhibitor, who works in Malayalam film industry. He founded Aashirvad Cinemas in 1999, a film production company producing films starring Mohanlal, whom he first met in 1987 while working as a chauffeur. Antony later co-founded the film distribution company Maxlab Cinemas and Entertainments and expanded Aashirvad Cinemas into film distribution, including international releasing. Antony also owns the multiplex theatre chain Aashirvad Cineplexx and has made cameo appearances in several Mohanlal films.

As a producer, he has received several awards, including two National Film Awards, four Kerala State Film Awards and a Filmfare Awards South among others. In 2026, The Indian Express wrote that "Antony Perumbavoor is widely regarded as the most successful Malayalam film producer of all time".

== Early life and family ==
Antony was born on 25 May 1968 to Malekudy Joseph and Elamma in Perumbavoor, Kerala, India. His father worked as a contractor at a sawmill in the town. Antony was one of four children; his siblings were Baby, Pappachan, and Selena. He grew up in Perumbavoor and attended Iringole Upper Primary School and MGM Higher Secondary School, Kuruppampady. At age 18, he bought his first vehicle, a four-wheel drive Jeep. His first association with the film industry came when the Jeep was hired for a day's work on a film set. He later began working as a driver on the set of Pattanapravesham (1988) and met Mohanlal, which became a turning point in his career. His father encouraged him after learning that he was working with the actor. Antony was 20 when he first drove Mohanlal.

== Career ==
In 1987, Antony worked as a driver on the set of Pattanapravesham (1988), where he drove several actors before being asked to pick up Mohanlal from Ambalamugal, marking their first meeting. He subsequently drove Mohanlal for the film's remaining 22-day shooting schedule before returning to his hometown. A month later, while watching the filming of Moonnam Mura (1988) in Ambalamugal, Antony was recognised by Mohanlal in the crowd and invited to work as his driver again. Afterward, Mohanlal offered him a position as his personal chauffeur, which Antony accepted. He took over the position after Mohanlal's regular driver, Mohanan Nair, developed health problems. Nair had previously served as the driver of Mohanlal's father, Viswanathan Nair.

In 1999, Antony established the film production company Aashirvad Cinemas. It debuted with Mohanlal-starring action drama Narasimham, which became the highest-grossing Malayalam film to that date. Until 2009, the films of Aarshirvad Cinemas were distributed by Swargachitra and later by Central Pictures. In 2009, Antony along with Mohanlal and industrialist K. C. Babu established the film distribution company Maxlab Cinemas and Entertainments, debuting with Sagar Alias Jacky Reloaded.

In 2016, Antony established his first multiplex theater, Aashirvad Cineplexx in Perumbavoor and later opened its chain in other regions in the state. In 2017, Antony was elected the vice-president of the newly formed Film Exhibitors United Organisation of Kerala (FEUOK), an organisation comprising producers, distributors, and exhibitors in Malayalam film industry. Since July 2017, he is the president of FEUOK. In 2019, Aashirvad Cinemas opened office in Hong Kong under the name Feitian Aashirvad Cinemas. In 2022, Aashirvad opened office at Business Bay in Dubai and began distributing films overseas in collaboration with Phars Film, debuting with Barroz.

In a OnManorama article in 2020, Unni K. Warrier wrote that "his colleagues in the industry see him as superstar Mohanlal's closest friend, aide and confidante". In 2026, The Indian Express wrote that "Antony Perumbavoor is widely regarded as the most successful Malayalam film producer of all time". Mohanlal's wife Suchitra once said that Antony would say "no" in situations where Mohanlal cannot say it and he "always has his back".

== Personal life ==
Antony is married to Shanti and the couple have two children. He resides in Aimury, Perumbavoor. Antony is a teetotaller.

== Filmography ==
=== Acting credits ===
Antony is known for appearing in cameo roles in Mohanlal films.

Year	Title	Role	Notes
1991	Kilukkam	Driver Antony	
1991	Uncle Bun	School bus driver	
1992	Adhwaytham	Messenger	
1992	Kamaladalam	Messenger	
1993	Gandharvam	Thief on motorcycle	
1994	Thenmavin Kombath	Festival committee member	
1994	Minnaram	Man at Squash Club	
1994	Pingami	Devasootty	
1995	Thacholi Varghese Chekavar	College student	
1996	Kaalapani	Mukundan's friend	
1997	Varnapakittu	Man in the store	
1997	Chandralekha	Company staff	
1997	Iruvar	Man sitting near the body of Anandan during the funeral parade	Tamil film; cameo appearance
1998	Kanmadam	Police constable	
1998	Harikrishnans	Antony	
1998	Ayal Kadha Ezhuthukayanu	Man in the shop	
2007	Ali Bhai	Bus driver	
2009	Sagar Alias Jacky Reloaded	Thawb clad man	
2013	Drishyam	Constable Antony	
2016	Oppam	Boat passenger	
2016	Pulimurugan	Jeep driver	
2017	Velipadinte Pusthakam	Man at wedding	
2017	Villain	SI Joy K. Thomas	
2018	Aadhi	Himself	Cameo appearance
2018	Odiyan	KSEB employee	Cameo appearance
2019	Irupathiyonnaam Noottaandu	Antony Bavoor	
2019	Lucifer	Daniel Rowther	Cameo appearance
2019	Ittymaani: Made in China	De-addiction centre attender	
2021	Drishyam 2	SI Antony	
2021	Marakkar: Arabikadalinte Simham	Shopkeeper	
2022	Bro Daddy	SI Antony Joseph	
2022	Aaraattu	Himself	Cameo appearance
2023	Neru	Mohammed's neighbour	
2024	Barroz 3D	Intelligence officer	
2025	L2 Empuraan	Daniel Rowther	
2025	Hridayapoorvam	Himself	Cameo appearance
2026	Drishyam 3	CI Antony	
2026	Thudakkam	Cafe owner	

=== Distribution ===
==== Aashirvad Cinemas ====
- 2024: Barroz
- 2025: Empuraan
- 2025: Hridayapoorvam
- 2026: Drishyam 3
- 2026: Thudakkam

== Accolades ==
National Film Awards

- 2012: Best Film on Other Social Issues – Spirit
- 2021: Best Feature Film – Marakkar: Arabikadalinte Simham

Kerala State Film Awards

- 2001: Best Film with Popular Appeal and Aesthetic Value – Raavanaprabhu
- 2008: Best Film with Popular Appeal and Aesthetic Value – Innathe Chintha Vishayam
- 2009: Best Film with Popular Appeal and Aesthetic Value – Evidam Swargamanu
- 2013: Best Film with Popular Appeal and Aesthetic Value – Drishyam

Filmfare Awards South

- 2013: Best Film – Malayalam - Drishyam

South Indian International Movie Awards

- 2013: Best Film in Malayalam – Drishyam

Asianet Film Awards

- 2000: Best Film – Narasimham
- 2012: Most Popular Film – Spirit
- 2013: Best Film – Drishyam
- 2013: Most Popular Film – Drishyam
- 2016: Best Film – Oppam
- 2020: Best Film — Lucifer

Jaihind TV Awards

- 2007: Best Film – Paradesi
- 2013: Best Film - ‘’Drishyam’’

Kairali TV – World Malayali Council Film Award

- 2009: Best Film – Evidam Swargamanu
