= Marakkar: Lion of the Arabian Sea =

2021 film directed by Priyadarshan

- Theatrical release poster
- Malayalam: Marakkar: Arabikadalinte Simham
- Directed by: Priyadarshan
- Screenplay by: Priyadarshan; Ani I. V. Sasi
- Story by: Priyadarshan
- Produced by: Antony Perumbavoor
- Starring: Mohanlal; Arjun Sarja; Prabhu; Suniel Shetty; Manju Warrier; Siddique
- Cinematography: Tirru
- Edited by: M. S. Aiyyappan Nair
- Music by: Score: Rahul Raj; Ankit Suri; Lyell Evans Roeder; Songs: Ronnie Raphael
- Production companies: Aashirvad Cinemas; Confident Group CJ Roy
- Distributed by: Maxlab Cinemas and Entertainments (Kerala); V. Creations (Tamil Nadu); Phars Films (Overseas)
- Release date: 2 December 2021
- Running time: 181 minutes
- Country: India
- Language: Malayalam
- Budget: ₹100 crore

Marakkar: Lion of the Arabian Sea (titled Marakkar: Arabikadalinte Simham in Malayalam) is a 2021 Indian Malayalam-language epic historical action drama film directed by Priyadarshan. Set in the 16th century Kozhikode, the film is based on the fourth Kunjali Marakkar named Muhammad Ali, the admiral of the fleet of the Zamorin. Priyadarshan scripted the film with Ani I. V. Sasi. The film is produced by Antony Perumbavoor's Aashirvad Cinemas. Marakkar features Mohanlal as Marakkar and Pranav Mohanlal as young Marakkar in the titlular roles, with an ensemble cast consisting of Arjun Sarja, Suniel Shetty, Prabhu, Ashok Selvan, Nedumudi Venu (his posthumous film), Mukesh, Siddique, Manju Warrier, Keerthy Suresh, Kalyani Priyadarshan, Suhasini Maniratnam, Innocent, Mamukkoya, Hareesh Peradi, Santhosh Keezhattoor and K. B. Ganesh Kumar. In the film, upon being terrorised by an oppressive Portuguese regime, legendary naval chieftain Kunjali Marakkar IV wages an epic war against the Europeans and their allies. This film was Keerthy Suresh's comeback to Malayalam cinema after a gap of seven years and the Malayalam debut of Ashok Selvan.

The initial plan for a film based on the admirals Kunjali Marakkar started between Priyadarshan, Mohanlal, and screenwriter T. Damodaran in 1996. Damodaran pitched a plot idea in 1999. However, the film did not materialise in Damodaran's lifetime because of the high budget requirements, which was unaffordable for a Malayalam film at that time. Priyadarshan kept the project in mind for years, until in 2017 he proceeded with the research work. The final draft was completed by June 2018.

Principal photography took place from December 2018 to March 2019, filmed in sets created at Ramoji Film City in Hyderabad. It lasted 104 days and post-production took 14 months. Four life-size ship replicas were constructed and were shot inside a water tank. The sea was completely created using visual effects. Sabu Cyril and Siddharth Priyadarshan oversaw the production design and visual effects supervision, respectively. Production began with a budget of ₹100 crore, making it the most expensive Malayalam film to date. The original score was composed by Rahul Raj, Ankit Suri and Lyell Evans Roeder; and songs by Ronnie Raphael.

The film, originally scheduled to release on 19 March 2020, was delayed by the outbreak of COVID-19. It was then rescheduled and postponed through three more dates in March, May, and August 2021 before settling on release date by the end of the year. Meanwhile, at the 67th National Film Awards, the film won three awards — Best Feature Film, Best Special Effects, and Best Costume Design. The film released theatrically worldwide on 2 December 2021. It received mixed to negative reviews and became a box office bomb.

== Plot ==
During the late 1500s, the empire of Portugal allies with the kingdom of Kochi in Malabar, Kerala, seeking to colonise the region by overthrowing the rival kingdom of Kozhikode. Portuguese commander Alfonso de Noronho trains Kochi soldiers in firearms and supplies cannons in exchange for crops and spices. The natives resent the Cartaz licence system, which restricts trade with Arabs. Merchant Kuttiyali Marakkar circumvents Portuguese customs, but his brother-in-law Moidu, an ally of Alfonso, betrays him.

Former Kozhikode naval commanders Kuttiyali and his sons, Kutti Poker Ali and Pattu Marakkar, had resisted the Portuguese before becoming merchants following Poker's death in battle. Years later, Poker's son Muhammad Ali marries his childhood sweetheart Aisha, but Alfonso kills Aisha, Muhammad's mother, and Kuttiyali in a raid that night. Kochi's king disguises the attack as a civil massacre and blames Muhammad and Pattu, who escape. They assassinate Moidu and flee by raft, eventually reaching Ponnani, where they meet Kozhikode commanders Achuthan and Anandan. After the corrupt nāduvāzhi Namathu Kurup hoards supplies intended for storm victims, Muhammad recruits bandit Thangudu and robs Kurup to distribute the goods. He subsequently leads raids against corrupt nobles, adopting the name Kunjali Marakkar and becoming both protector of the people and a fugitive.

Years later, Marakkar's gang wages guerrilla warfare against Portuguese vessels. During one raid, they encounter Chiang, a Chinese slave. When gang member Aimutty threatens Chiang's mother, Marakkar saves her but accidentally kills Aimutty. Chiang and his mother are rescued, and Chiang becomes Marakkar's friend, earning the name "Chinnali". Aimutty's brother Mayinkutty seeks revenge but is killed by Chinnali first.

Viceroy Francisco de Gama threatens war after the Samoothiri rejects a Portuguese trading proposal. When Achuthan claims the Portuguese cannot be defeated, Anandan proposes recruiting Marakkar. Recognised as Poker's son, Marakkar replaces Achuthan as naval commander after the Samoothiri condemns Achuthan's dishonourable conduct. Marakkar defeats the Portuguese using naval traps and kills Alfonso, earning the court's praise. The Samoothiri restores his family's fortress, which develops into a village, though diplomats of Kolathunadu remain allied with the Portuguese.

Chinnali falls in love with Aarcha, daughter of minister Dharmoth Panicker, who reciprocates despite Achuthan's feelings for her. Their parents arrange Aarcha's marriage to Achuthan, but she, pregnant with Chinnali's child, elopes with him. Achuthan falsely accuses Chinnali of abducting her. During a confrontation, Achuthan kills Chinnali and flees; Aarcha then commits suicide. Arriving too late, Marakkar mistakenly believes Anandan killed Chinnali and slashes his throat.

Achuthan further frames Marakkar for assaulting a court member. After a new monarch, Nambyathiri, submits Kozhikode to Portuguese rule, the Portuguese and Kozhikode forces besiege Marakkar's village, aided by Kolathunadu's betrayal. When Marakkar continues resisting, De Gama proposes executing his captured followers daily. Nambyathiri refuses and is beaten by De Gama; Pattu is among the first executed.

Marakkar kidnaps De Gama, securing his people's release, but Achuthan and Aimutty's wife Subaida lure him into a trap. Subaida regrets her betrayal after Marakkar forgives her, but he is arrested. Taken to Velha, Goa, Marakkar is convicted and sentenced to death by guillotine after refusing to seek mercy. He is last seen joining his mother in the afterlife.

== Cast ==
- Mohanlal as Muhammad Ali / Kunjali Marakkar IV, an Indian Muslim warrior and the last Marakkar, who organizes armed rebellions against the nobles of Kozhikode and imperial Portuguese.
  - Pranav Mohanlal as Young Kunjali (Mammali)
- Arjun Sarja as Anandan, the elder son of Mangattachan and commander of the Kozhikode military, known for being just and compassionate.
  - Arun Kurian as Young Anandan
- Suniel Shetty as Chandroth Panicker, the monarch of Kolathunadu under the Samoothiri and Marakkar's ally, who's eventually betrayed by his own diplomats.
- Ashok Selvan as Achuthan Mangattachan, Mangattachan's second son and Anandan's brother who is jealous and arrogant of Anandan and Marakkar's popularity and plots to kill them
  - Jitin Puthenchery as Young Achuthan
- Prabhu as Thangudu, a physically strong bandit troop leader and Kunjali's best friend
  - Arjun krishnadas as Young Thangudu
- Manju Warrier as Subaida
- Keerthy Suresh as Aarcha
- Kalyani Priyadarshan as Aisha, Marakkar's wife
- Mukesh as Dharmoth Panicker, Samoothiri's minister and Aarcha's father
- Nedumudi Venu as Samoothiri
- Siddique as Pattu Marakkar, Kunjali's uncle
- Jay J. Jakkrit as Chiang Juvan (Chinnali), Kunjali's helper and fighter
- Innocent as Namath Kurup
- K. B. Ganesh Kumar as Verkottu Panicker, Chandroth Panicker's uncle
- Baburaj as Puthumana Panicker, Chandroth Panicker's father
- Hareesh Peradi as Mangattachan, Anandan and Achuthan's father and Chandroth Panicker's guru
- Mamukkoya as Aboobakkar Haji
- Nandu as Kuthiravattath Nair, Samoothiri's helper
- Santhosh Keezhattoor as Kokkattu Panicker, Chandroth Panicker's uncle
- Fazil as Kutti Ali Marakkar, Kunjali's father
- Suhasini Maniratnam as Khadeejumma, Kunjali's mother.
- Suresh Krishna as Moidu, Kutti Ali's brother
- Manikuttan as Mayinkutty, Aimutty's younger brother and Subaida's brother-in-law
- G. Suresh Kumar as Kochi Raja
- Srikant Murali as Kochi Raja's advisor
- Krishna Prasad as Translator
- Arjun Nandhakumar as Nambyathiri, Samoothiri's nephew
- Parvathi T. as Samoothiri's sister
- Komal Sharma as Puthumana Thampuratti, Anandan's wife
- Toby Sauberback as Viceroy Francisco Da Gama, Portuguese colonists's leader
- Max Cavenham as André Furtado de Mendonça
- Paul Huntley-Thomas as Alphonso De Noronha, Portuguese military officer
- Bineesh Kodiyeri as Thangudu's assistant
- Shiyas Kareem as Marakkar's assistant
- Kozhikode Narayanan Nair as Aboobakkar Haji
- Antony Perumbavoor as Street Vendor (cameo appearance)
- Vikraman Nair as Rajaguru

== Production ==
=== Development ===
A film based on Kunjali Marakkar was originally planned by Priyadarshan with screenwriter T. Damodaran in 1996, with Mohanlal in the title role. The idea for the film originated and was discussed in length at the sets of Mohanlal-starring Kaalapani (1996) in Kozhikode. Due to budget constraints, it did not progress, "back then, our industry size was very limited and most producers weren't ready to invest hugely in such big ventures", said Priyadarshan. Damodaran pitched a plot idea in 1999, but "it was inconceivable back then to make a film that was extensively set at sea", said Priyadarshan. The project was still on their mind for years. Priyadarshan recalled that it was difficult to shoot with one ship in Kaalapani, let alone a film with multiple ships on turbulent waters of the Arabian Sea. Years later, with the advancement of visual effects and producers willing to fund the film, Priyadarshan revisited the idea. Meanwhile, during 2008 – 2009, director Jayaraj too planned a film on Kunjali Marakkar with Mohanlal in the title role and hired T. P. Rajeevan to write the screenplay. It was ready to begin production and when the screenplay was handed over to Mohanlal, he did not show interest. That screenplay was later bought by August Cinema from Rajeevan for making a separate project with different cast and crew.

In 2013, Priyadarshan revealed that in addition to a Hindi film, he was working on a Malayalam period film about a Kunjali Marakkar chieftain with Mohanlal in the title role for which the research work was ongoing. On 1 November 2017, Priyadarshan confirmed to The Times of India that he would start the project after completing a Hindi film first and the ongoing research would require at least 10 more months to complete. They wanted to look deeper into history since what was gathered until then was information already available to the public. It was undecided then on which Kunjali Marakkar would Mohanlal portray out of the four Marakkars. Priyadarshan said the story he would come up with would be a mix of fact and fiction, as the information about many of the incidents that happened during that era are unavailable. Priyadarshan zeroed in on Kunjali Marakkar IV as the protagonist as he "has the most interesting story". Mohanlal said that their idea was to make a patriotic film. Marakkar IV was at the forefront of resistance against the Portuguese invaders and is regarded as the first naval commander in India and was also an expert navigator. That is why they have dubbed him the "lion of the Arabian Sea".

The movie is something that all of us can be proud of, as it's well made. It tells the story of Kunjali Marakkar, who is considered as India's first Naval Commander and we are dedicating the film to the Indian Navy. The making is a level higher than usual Malayalam films and it has made use of all the available technical facilities.

— Mohanlal

The title of the film was officially announced at a press conference held at Kochi on 28 April 2018 by Priyadarshan, Mohanlal, producer Antony Perumbavoor and co-producers Santhosh T. Kuruvilla and Roy C. J. The budget was revealed to be ₹100 crore, making it the most expensive film made in Malayalam cinema—produced under the company Aashirvad Cinemas, with Moonshot Entertainments and Confident Group as co-producers. Production is said to have begun on 1 November 2018 on the day of Kerala Piravi. Priyadarshan said that it took him three years to commence filming from the day he had conceived the film.

=== Writing ===
Priyadarshan co-wrote the screenplay with his assistant Ani I. V. Sasi. Ani himself expressed interest in collaborating with Priyadarshan when he learnt that the latter was working on a film about Kunjali Marakkar. Priyadarshan also incorporating many inputs from late Damodaran from their early discussions. The first draft was completed in April 2018. It was estimated to require seven months for pre-production and eight months for post-production. They completed the final draft by early June 2018. The story spans the period from 1505 to 1601. Marakkar IV was chosen as the protagonist not only because he has the most interesting story, but also they knew more about him than the other Marakkars, and he was the one who brought a lot of strategies, and "everything ended with him". Priyadarshan said that not many reliable sources exist about Marakkar I, and facts about Marakkar II, III, and IV are a mystery, and their available accounts are conflicting with each other. The screenplay was written with a combination of facts, fiction, and folklore. He said that his characters are historical figures but they all may not be contemporaries, cinematic liberty that he has taken.

Most of the female characters in the film are imaginary. Due to a lack of sufficient written history and reliable sources, it is difficult to know the facts about Marakkars. There were more unanswered questions and contradicting accounts and perspectives. Priyadarshan relied on commonsense and basic human behavioral patterns to fill the gaps. According to him, the screenplay contains 30 percent history and 70 percent fiction. Marakkar IV is presented as a hero of a fairy tale. Since nothing much is known about Marakkar IV, artistic freedom was to be used to tell his story. Whatever was found about him was completely contradictory, while the Europeans portray him as a villain, the Arabs hail him as a savior. Priyadarshan took the basic structure of the story from a chapter he learned as a child in his grade three textbook and worked on that. According to him, "Marakkar was a patriot whose loyalty to his land came above barriers of caste and religion. That is my message in my film. If Kunjali Marakkar could do it so many years ago, why do we find it so difficult to put our country ahead of caste, religion and region?". A disclaimer is added in the opening of the film that it contains fiction.

=== Casting ===
Mohanlal was attached to the project in the initial discussion itself in 1996. The screenplay was written with Mohanlal in mind as Priyadarshan wanted an actor with an image that fits the larger-than-life stature of Marakkar IV. Priyadarshan said that, "heroic figures like Marakkar or Velu Thampi Dalawa had this aura about them and Lal has that", also Marakkar IV was 53 years old when he died and Mohanlal suits the age too. The team was then on a lookout for a Chinese actor to play the role of Chinali, Marakkar IV's trusted lieutenant. In May 2018, it was reported that Nagarjuna, Suniel Shetty, and Paresh Rawal has been cast alongside Mohanlal in ensemble roles. Shetty was confirmed to have signed the film, while Nagarjuna was in talks for a role. Shetty grew his hair out for his role. In June, Nagarjuna said he has not yet heard the script and will sign only after that. At the end, he did not take the role. Madhu and Prabhu were confirmed in that month, with the former cast as Kunjali Marakkar I / Kuttiyali Marakkar. Prabhu plays a Tamil shipwright who build boats for Marakkar, such a character is mentioned in history. Madhu opted out from the film (and other films) as part of his decision to retire from cinema industry. Fazil took the role in his absence. Akshay Kumar was offered a role, but declined.

In July 2018, Durga Krishna was reported to have been cast in a pivotal role. The team was aiming to complete the casting by the end of September 2018, including the actress for female lead role. More cast were revealed in that month. Arjun Sarja was confirmed in a principal role. Both Shetty's and Sarja's roles are based on real-life characters in a "slightly fictionalised" form as not much about them are known from history. Renji Panicker, Nedumudi Venu and Siddique were confirmed to play supporting roles. Priyadarshan revealed that Pranav Mohanlal and Kalyani Priyadarshan will be making "special appearances" in the film, with Pranav playing a young Marakkar IV. They play a couple. Kalyani said she herself asked her father for a role in the film. Keerthy Suresh plays an important role. She learned veena as part of preparing for her character who is trained in classical music. Her character has a romantic relationship with Chinali / Chiang Juvan, played by Chinese actor Jay J. Jakkrit. Mukesh was confirmed to be in the film. In October 2018, Pooja Kumar was in talks for a role. Manju Warrier was cast as Subaida. Ashok Selvan was cast in an antagonistic role, making his debut in Malayalam cinema. Shiyas Kareem was cast as a sidekick in Marakkar IV's gang; he had 50 days shoot.

=== Filming and production design ===
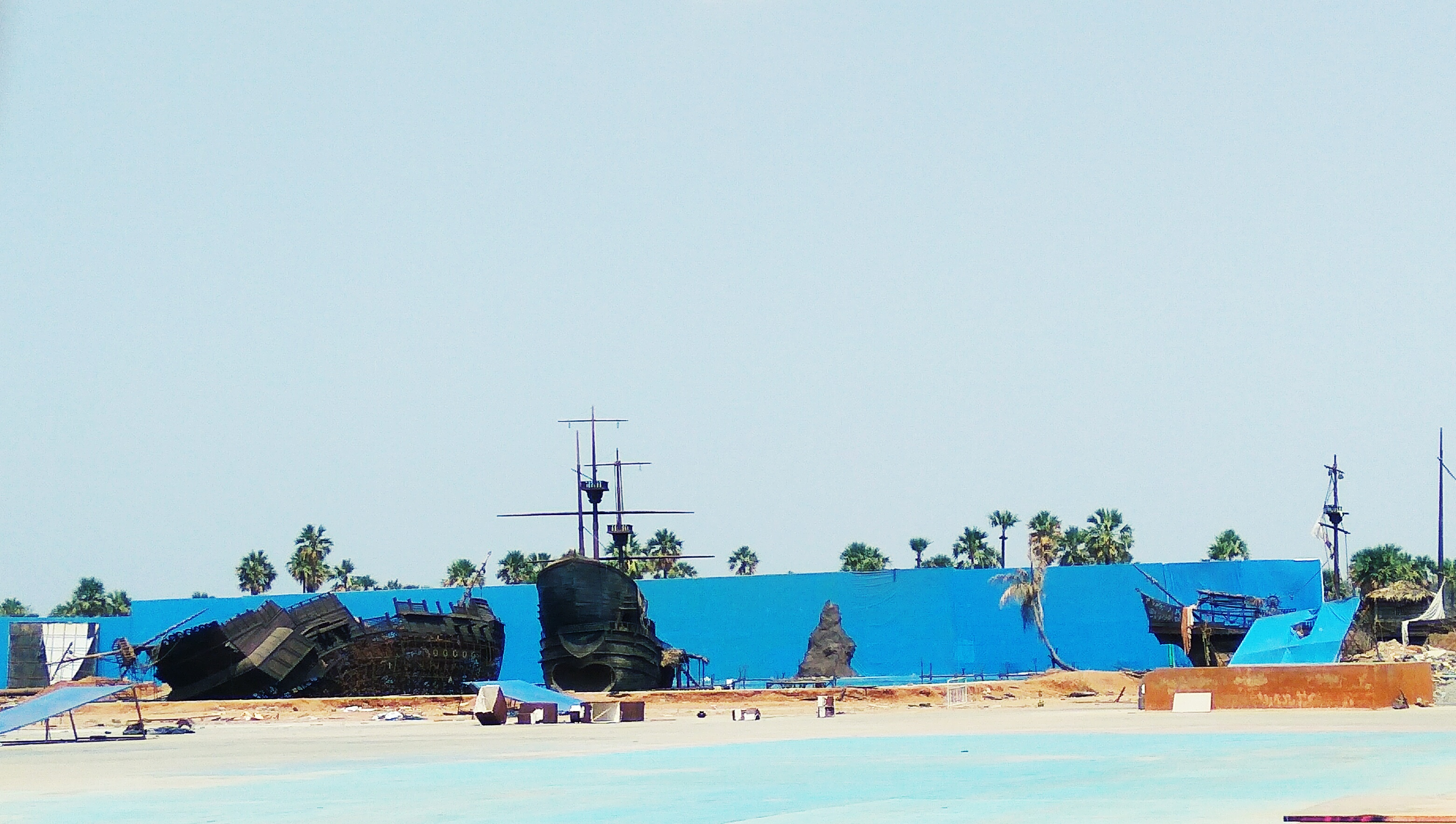
One of the abandoned set of Lion of the Arabian Sea at Ramoji Film City.

Principal photography began on 1 December 2018 at Ramoji Film City, Hyderabad. Cinematography was handled by Tirru. Co-writer Ani Sasi also worked as an assistant director in the film. Pranav and Kalyani shot a few scenes early that month. A song sequence between the two was choreographed by Brinda. Prasanna Sujit choreographed another sequence. Mohanlal joined the sets in mid December. Filming was wrapped by late March 2019. Principal photography lasted 104 days. The bulk of filming took place at Ramoji Film City itself, a five-day shoot was also held in Thiruvananthapuram. Meeting scene between the Samoothiri and the Portuguese was shot at Adimalathura. Kazu Neda, Sumret Muangput, and B. Thyagarajan were responsible for the action sequences.

Priyadarshan's frequent collaborator Sabu Cyril was the film's production designer. The story is set 500 years ago in what is now Kerala. Even though the events happened during that period are recorded in history, there are no proper documentation about the outfits, ornaments, their colour, weapons or home appliances used. Hence, some of them were made from imagination and referring available material. Ships were not built but bought from Egypt during the period of Kunjali Marakkars. Four life-size ship replicas and a 200×200 metre tank were built at Ramoji Film City. Installed on a one-acre space, the tank was filled with 150,000 litre of water. The film was never shot on sea, the action sequences on the high seas, the storm, and the thundering waves was completely created using visual effects. There are no paintings of Marakkar IV, and it is unknown how he became the admiral of the Samoothiri. There were hardly any pictorial references regarding the costumes or ornaments worn by the warriors and the people, for that they had to depend on their imagination and some books and paintings for reference. Several other sets were also created for the film. Cannons were built accurately, but swords, shields, and helmets of Samoothiri's arsenal was made by referring similar armory existed in that century, exact models could not be found. A total of 40 cannons and more than 1000 swords were made. Some swords were made from carbon fibers while others were from bamboo. Horses were used in the film because there was recorded history that Samoothiri used to import horses from Bahadur Shah of Gujarat.

On setting the period, they also considered the temperature of that period, which was only 21 degree Celsius at peak in summer. Priyadarshan said that creating the old mast ships, war galleys of the Portuguese, and the battle sequences on sea were the bigger challenges in making the film. For research, Priyadarshan could not locate the spot or remains of neither Marakkars' fort in Iringal, nor Samoothiri's palace, even Archaeological Survey of India did not have any clue. In the film, elephant is used as the insignia of Samoothiri's kingdom. The idea was taken from the Emblem of Kerala which is presumed to be composed of the elephant insignia of Samoothiri and shanku insignia of Trivandrum kingdom. Since Samoothiri bought the ships from Egypt by bartering spices, his ships are Arabian model. Cyril took only ₹25 lakh as remuneration, which was far less than what he usually charge, for his love for the film. Sujith Sudhakaran and V. Sai was in charge of the costume department. Keerthy's wardrobes, ornaments and character looks were based on three Raja Ravi Varma paintings. Indrakshi Pattanaik was her stylist.

=== Post-production ===
M. S. Aiyappan Nair was the editor, and the digital intermediate was processed by Prime Focus studio with Ashirwad Hadkar as the colorist. Sachin Sudhakaran and Hariharan Muralidharan of Sync Cinema served as the sound designers, while M. R. Rajakrishnan of Four Frames Sound Company handled the sound mixing. Around a quarter of the film is set in sea, nonetheless, the film was never shot on sea, except for a shot of sea shore. The sea was completely created using visual effects. Priyadarshan's son Siddharth Priyadarshan worked as the film's visual effects supervisor, he hired his son to reduce the film's cost. Siddharth divided the graphics work among four personnel. The film was shot using storyboard (which is scarcely used in Indian productions) as it is helpful in creating visual effects. In Priyadarshan's view, success of a film like Lion of the Arabian Sea depends largely on the fineness of graphics, "if you don't get your graphics right, the film will look terrible. Which we have seen often in Indian cinema". Priyadarshan said that the most difficult thing to create in VFX is water and fire, for that they bought necessary software from Austria and Hungary. Pune-based Anibrain, and two Chennai-based Knack Studios and Golden Star Studio were employed for the film's visual effects creation. Post-production began in Chennai as soon as they completed filming. It was expected to last 11 months, with eight months consuming for visual effects alone. Post-production took 14 months to complete. The film was reportedly completed with a cost of ₹85 – 100 crore. The film's theatrical cut runs for 181.07 minutes. It underwent censoring in India on 23 December 2019.

== Music ==
The original score was composed by Rahul Raj, Ankit Suri and Lyell Evans Roeder. Suri and Roeder, composers of Alternative Fidelity, a British-American music production house were hired to compose the score for battle sequences in the film. It was also their debut in Malayalam cinema. A few months later, Rahul Raj, who freshly graduated from Berklee College of Music was hired to independently compose and produce the rest of the score. Raj was chosen by Priyadarshan after being impressed watching a video of him conducting a 52-piece London orchestra as part of his thesis in Berklee. While scoring, Raj avoided giving a regional touch to the music which would have been easier for a film set in Malabar, as Priyadarshan was clear that he was making a film which caters for a global audience and it should resonate in its music too. Deviating from his usual norm, Priyadarshan who is known for giving references and definitive instructions to his composers, gave full creative freedom to Rahul Raj for scoring. His only instruction was to imagine as if he is working for a Hollywood epic and compose with that on mind. Raj wanted a soundscape that could bring an epic feel as in films produced during the golden age of Hollywood. He mentioned Ben-Hur and The Ten Commandments as examples. Beside composing, Rahul Raj also performed programming and production entirely by himself as opposed to havIng additional programmers in many regular film scores. The Chennai Strings Orchestra played string pieces for some of the significant portions.

The original songs in Malayalam were composed by Ronnie Raphael. In the initial stage, Priyadarshan planned only fours songs in the film, with one being instrumental. His plan was to experiment by diving three songs to three composers. However, all songs were finally given to Raphael. Raphael had composed music for Priyadarshan's Hindi film Anamika in the Forbidden Love series, after which he was offered the position in Lion of the Arabian Sea too. He composed five songs for the film. Recording began as early as November 2018 when filming had not begun. The songs were sung by K. S. Chithra, M. G. Sreekumar, Vineeth Sreenivasan, Shweta Mohan, Shreya Ghoshal and Zia Ul Haq, with lyrics by Prabha Varma, B. K. Harinarayanan, Shafi Kollam, and Priyadarshan. Saina Music acquired the music rights in February 2020 for an all-time record sum in Malayalam cinema.

The first single "Kunju Kunjali", sung by K. S. Chithra was released in all languages on 10 February 2021. A flute cover of "Kunju Kunjali" by Josy Alappuzha, who also played flute in the original track, was released on 22 February 2021. It was released on digital music platforms on 3 March 2021 as a track in the album. A teaser of second track "Kannil Ente" was released on 24 March 2021, and the full song was released in all languages on 31 March 2021. The third track "Chembinte Chelulla", sung by Vishnu Raj was released in all languages on 21 May 2021, marking Mohanlal's birthday. On 10 November 2021, the theme of "Marakkar" composed by Rahul Raj, was launched through streaming platforms and also on YouTube.

== Marketing ==
On 22 September 2019, The first teaser trailer of the film was exclusively screened at Aashirvadathode Lalettan, an event held at Gokulam Park, Kochi, organised by Aashirvad Cinemas. The first trailer released in March 2020 was edited by Alphonse Putharen. In November 2021, a promotional event was conducted on the luxury cruise ship Nefertiti Cruise, organised in association with Jain International School of Creative Arts.

== Release ==
=== Theatrical ===
The film was originally scheduled to be released on 19 March 2020, as announced in October 2019. It was then moved to 26 March by January 2020. However, it was further postponed without a release date after the outbreak of COVID-19 pandemic. Priyadarshan said that the postponement was at the behest of exhibitors in the Gulf, particularly those across Kuwait, Saudi Arabia and the United Arab Emirates, as the box office collection from these countries are crucial to the film's success. In February 2021, Mohanlal told to Variety that it is a global film with an international release, so they are waiting for the COVID-19 situation to normalise, "when everything settles and people are back to the theaters, only then can we release". The film was then rescheduled and postponed again three times in 2021: 26 March, 13 May, and 12 August.

Fans show tickets for more than 100 shows were already sold out when it postponed release in March 2020. There was a surge in COVID-19 cases in India when it was about to release in May 2021 coinciding with Eid al-Fitr. The film could not release in the Onam holidays aimed August 2021 date as the test positivity rate (TPR) in Kerala was the highest in India at that time and theatres remained closed per government order. Theatres were later allowed to run with half its seating capacity. On 6 November 2021, producer Antony Perumbavoor said that they are cancelling theatrical release and the film will have a direct-to-OTT premiere through Amazon Prime Video. Reportedly, they made a ₹90 crore deal with Prime Video for a direct-to-OTT premiere. In early November 2021, a preview show was held for Mohanlal, his wife Suchitra Mohanlal, and producer Antony in Chennai, the theatrical experience from the show changed their decision to opt for a theatrical release. On 11 November, Saji Cherian, minister of Kerala State Film Development Corporation announced that the film will be releasing on 2 December 2021 in theatres, which was decided after a meeting with the makers. The government also waived entertainment tax for all films releasing in Kerala until 31 December. The makers renegotiated and relaxed the deal with Prime Video to allow for a theatrical debut prior to OTT. The film's release date coincide with the National Day holiday of the United Arab Emirates, where it premieres a day early, on 1 December 2021.

=== Distribution ===
The film was reported to be releasing in more than 5000 theatres worldwide in March 2020, and in more than 50 countries worldwide, which would make it the largest release for a Malayalam film up until then. Besides the original Malayalam version, the film also has dubbed versions in Hindi, Tamil, Telugu, and Kannada. Priyadarshan said that they also plans to dub the film in Arabic. In 2019, they made a deal to release the film in China, dubbed in Chinese, and signed a co-production and distribution agreement with a Chinese company. Kalaipuli S. Thanu of V. Creations bought the distribution right for the film's Tamil dubbed version. The Telugu version is distributed by Suresh Productions. The film is releasing in 4100 screens worldwide in five languages, with 16,000 shows on the opening days. Out of the 631 screens in Kerala, 626 screens is playing Lion of the Arabian Sea.

=== Home media ===
Marakkar was released on 17 December 2021 through Amazon Prime Video in Malayalam, Tamil, Telugu, Kannada and Hindi.

== Reception ==
=== Critical response ===
The movie received mixed reviews from critics and audience. In his review for The Hindu, S. R. Praveen wrote, "Kunjali Marakkar certainly deserved a much better tribute. In the end, it is not about the crores that you spend, but about how well you manage to engage and move the audience." The Times of India rated the film 2.5 on a scale of 5 and wrote that the film is "a historical hero's story that isn't rousing." Malayala Manorama praised the visuals, cinematography and production design. They wrote, "Marakkar is undoubtedly the biggest film by the Priyadarshan-Mohanlal combo, but not the best by the two." The Indian Express wrote, "Priyadarshan tells an age-old story without wearing down the viewers, though after a point, you may feel the movie is reluctant to show its inevitable climax. Otherwise, the movie makes for an engaging watch." The News Minute rated the movie 3 out of 5 and wrote that the film is "visually stunning" but "badly written." The New Indian Express wrote that the film "is yet another testament to Priyadarshan's remarkable ability to paint in broad strokes, but it falters when it comes to the emotional stakes." Anna M. M. Vetticad of Firstpost gave the film 1.5 out of 5 writing "Mohanlal-led war drama is remarkably unremarkable." Hindustan Times wrote that the film is "ambitious but underwhelming." Rating the film 2 out of 5, Deccan Herald also wrote that the film is an "underwhelming experience." The Quint gave the film a rating of 2.5 out of 5 and wrote that the film "is an epic disappointment."

=== Accolades ===
Year	Ceremony	Category	Recipient(s)	Result	Ref.
2020	50th Kerala State Film Awards	Best Dubbing Artist	Vineeth	Won	
2020	50th Kerala State Film Awards	Best Choreography	Brinda, Prasanna Sujit	Won	
2020	50th Kerala State Film Awards	Special Jury Award (Visual Effects)	Siddharth Priyadarshan	Won	
2021	67th National Film Awards	Best Feature Film	Priyadarshan, Antony Perumbavoor	Won	
2021	67th National Film Awards	Best Costume Design	Sujith Sudhakaran, V. Sai	Won	
2021	67th National Film Awards	Best Special Effects	Siddharth Priyadarshan	Won	
