= Odiyan =

2018 film by V. A. Shrikumar Menon

- Theatrical release poster
- Directed by: V. A. Shrikumar Menon
- Written by: Harikrishnan
- Produced by: Antony Perumbavoor
- Starring: Mohanlal; Prakash Raj; Manju Warrier
- Narrated by: Mammootty
- Cinematography: Shaji Kumar
- Edited by: Johnkutty
- Music by: Songs: M. Jayachandran; Score Sam C. S.
- Production company: Aashirvad Cinemas
- Distributed by: Max Creations Release
- Release date: 14 December 2018
- Running time: 167 minutes
- Country: India
- Language: Malayalam
- Box office: ₹54 crore

Odiyan (transl. Shapeshifter) is a 2018 Indian Malayalam-language supernatural fantasy drama film directed by V. A. Shrikumar Menon (in his feature film debut). Written by Harikrishnan, it is based on the legend of the Odiyan clan, who in Kerala folklore are men believed to possess shapeshifting abilities and can assume animal forms. Odiyans are said to have inhabited the Malabar region of Kerala before the widespread use of electricity. The film stars Mohanlal in the title role, alongside an ensemble cast of Prakash Raj, Manju Warrier, Siddique, Innocent, Manoj Joshi, Sana Althaf, Kailesh, Narain, Sreejaya Nair and Nandu. It was produced by Antony Perumbavoor through Aashirvad Cinemas. Manikyan, a notorious Odiyan, returns to his village after an exile of 15 years to see his lover once, including his friends, Damodharan and more over, Manikyan's girlfriend Prabha. His arrival causes much unease to some of the villagers, especially Ravunni Nair, Prabha's cousin brother, who has a personal grudge against him.

Principal photography began in Varanasi, Uttar Pradesh in August 2017. Major parts of the film were shot in Palakkad district, where the story's Thenkurissi village was recreated. Some scenes were filmed in Vagamon, Athirappilly, and Kochi. The film was completed after 145 days of shooting. Sam C. S. composed the film's score, which also features songs composed by M. Jayachandran. The film has editing by Johnkutty and cinematography by Shaji Kumar respectively.

Odiyan was released worldwide on 14 December 2018 alongside its dubbed versions in Tamil and Telugu languages. Upon release, Odiyan mainly received mixed reviews from critics who praised the performances, score and action sequences but criticized the direction, visual effects and the screenplay. Despite it the film grossed over ₹54 crore worldwide becoming one of the highest-grossing Malayalam films of all time.

== Cast ==
- Mohanlal as Odiyan Manikyan
- Prakash Raj as Raavunni Nair
- Manju Warrier as Prabha
- Manoj Joshi as Muthappan / Mootha Manikyan
- Innocent as Gopi
- Siddique as Damodaran Nair
- Narain as K. Prakashan
- Nandu as Ezhuthachan
- Kailash as Ravi
- Sreejaya Nair as Thankamani Varassiar
- Sana Althaf as Meenakshi
- Santhosh Keezhattoor as Vasudevan
- Aneesh G. Menon as Unnikrishnan
- Kannan Pattambi as Panchayat President
- Antony Perumbavoor as KSEB Employee
- Rajendran as Odiyan (cameo appearance)

== Production ==
=== Development ===
On 4 February 2017, Kerala Kaumudi reported that a 3D film titled Odiyan starring Mohanlal and Amitabh Bachchan, written by Harikrishnan and to be directed by commercial director V. A. Shrikumar Menon in what will be his feature film debut, was in development. Bachchan was reported to be playing the father of Mohanlal's character, and Prakash Raj and Manju Warrier were in substantial roles. The film is based on the legends of the "Odiyan" clan—mythical black magicians with the ability to shapeshift by using a trick called odi vidya. The mythical clan, which supposedly Inhabited the Malabar region of North Kerala, were said to terrorise people to death by appearing in animal forms called odi veykkuka at night. This story was based on folk tales of Odiyan; Harikrishnan did not undertake any additional research.

On 26 March 2017, Mohanlal confirmed the project officially via social media. He wrote that Antony Perumbavoor would produce the film through Aashirvad Cinemas, and that Sabu Cyril—who was later replaced by Prashanth Madhav—and Shaji Kumar would serve as production designer and cinematographer. Warrier would play the female lead role—though he did not mention Bachchan, Raj or the 3D format. According to Menon, Odiyan is a "rustic thriller" and the story is based on the tribes of Odiyans and their myth. Odiyans are said to have been the first "quotation gangs" (hired criminals) in Kerala, who went disguised as animals during night hours to attack their enemies. Menon described the film as a magical realism thriller. Both Menon and Harikrishnan originate from Palakkad (Malabar) and grew up hearing the legends of Odiyans during their childhood. It was Harikrishsnan's long-time dream to write a story on Odiyans. The film is also set in rural Palakkad.

Menon and Harikrishnan initially planned a children's film titled Randu Vaanavillukal, which was set in the drylands of Tamil Nadu. Before filming, however, the Tamil Nadu flood happened, turning the film location green and lush, making it unsuitable for the film and their plans to shift the location was unsuccessful. The two met again for a follow-up discussion. Odiyan originated from a conversation between Menon and Harikrishnan. Menon liked a one-line story narrated by Harikrishnan, who later wrote a single scene for Odiyan, which he intended as the introduction of the title character. He showed it to Menon, who sent it to Mohanlal and the project got underway. The scene remains in the film's final cut. Earlier, writer-director A. K. Lohithadas had proceeded with a story based on an Odiyan with Mohanlal in the lead role, but it was not made into a film. Director Lal Jose also contemplated making such a film, but later abandoned the idea. Evaluating these unsuccessful attempts, Harikrishnan said they may have failed because they might have directly followed the myth of the Odiyans rather than making a novel attempt. Harikrishnan wrote Odiyan devoid of myth. Antony Perumbavoor suggested a major change in the first draft of the screenplay, which introduced a villain into the film. The script was completely rewritten, after which Menon described Antony as an ace script doctor. Mohanlal suggested two minor changes in the second draft and in the second sitting approved the screenplay.

Harikrishnan got the plot idea when he was lecturing journalism classes; he asked the students to write a feature story to test their creativity. The subject was "if Hollywood director Steven Spielberg comes to Palakkad to meet the last Odiyan". The word "last" was registered in his mind and became the plot point in his screenplay. His story is about the last surviving Odiyan and the reasons his clan is almost extinct. The story spans 50 years and three generations of the last Odiyan lineage; it is set in the Thenkurissi village in Palakkad, where Odiyans were most popular. It is based on folktales prevalent in the Malabar region, chiefly in Palakkad. The screenplay was registered with the Writers Guild of America; producer Antony Perumbavoor gave them freedom to conceive the film as big as possible, giving the film an open budget.

=== Pre-production ===
The initial plan was to shoot the film in 3D but the plan was later dropped. In March 2017, it was reported that A. Sreekar Prasad would be the film's editor (he was later replaced by Johnkutty), M. Jayachandran as music director, P. M. Satheesh as sound designer, Peter Hein as stunt coordinator and Gokuldas (replaced by Prashanth Madhav) as art director. Menon said Odiyan is likely to release in 2017, but is uncertain as the film requires an extensive post-production with a large chunk of time need to be spent for visual effects. Filming was then scheduled to begin on 25 May 2017. In June 2017, the film crew convened for a script discussion session at an outdoor location in Kava, Palakkad. The film was then scheduled to begin on 1 August.

The official puja function of the film was held at hotel Vivanta by Taj in Thiruvananthapuram on 5 July 2017. The venue was shared by Aashirvad Cinemas' Aadhi's puja as well. In July, Menon said filming would begin by mid-August, "we will be shooting in locations such as Thasarak, Kollengode, Alathur, Nemmara, and Pollachi, where it is believed that Odiyans lived", additionally it will also have Varanasi as a location. He said many special effects would be utilised in the film and the post-production would last close to six months. It was also revealed the plan is to simultaneously release the film in Tamil and Telugu languages along with the original Malayalam version.

In August, Prashanth Madhav began the film's set work in Palakkad by creating the Thenkurissi village which pass through three eras in the story. The crew went for location recce in Palakkad and Varanasi in the month. Menon said that Odiyan Manikyan's journey starts from the holy Ghats in Varanasi, where he spend 15 years before returning to Thenkurissi. For the climax fight sequence set inside an Indian banyan tree, the team traveled across India to find a suitable tree, in places such as Cumbum, Theni, Mysore and almost finalised a tree called Dodda Alada Mara in Bangalore Urban. However, they were unable to obtain permission for night shooting there. The team finally able to find a tree in Kerala itself, in Palakkad.

=== Casting ===
Both Harikrishnan and Menon wanted Mohanlal in the lead role from the film's initial discussion itself and the screenplay was later tailor-made with Mohanlal in mind. His character Odiyan Manikyan has two stages, one at present and the other 30 years ago. Describing him, Menon said: "Manikyan is considered the greatest Odiyan that ever lived. He has mastered the skills that have been passed down by his forefathers of the clan". Soon after the film's confirmation by Mohanlal in March 2017, Menon revealed to media outlets that Raj would be portraying the antagonist and Warrier will have an equally important role as that of Mohanlal, while a leading Bollywood actor would also play a pivotal role. Raj plays the character of Ravunni. The characters of Mohanlal, Warrier and Raj pass through three stages of their life. Warrier portrays the character of Prabha. In the film, Prabha is shown in her late 20s, at 35 and in her 50s and so will have three looks.

In April, Menon confirmed Siddique and Nandu in the cast. In the same month, it was reported Appani Sarath would be part of the cast, but was not present in the final cast. Negotiations were going on with Hindi actor Amitabh Bachchan for a role. However, close to filming it was reported Tamil actor Sathyaraj had replaced Bachchan. It was for the role of Manikyan's grandfather, for which Hindi actor Manoj Joshi was ultimately cast. Writer Harikrishnan said, Bachchan had indeed agreed to work in the film, but was unable to join for personal reasons. Since the film would have been delayed if they waited for Bachchan, they move on to other actors. In June, a casting call was released seeking children and teenagers for playing the younger versions of Mohanlal, Warrier and Raj. It also invited youngsters for other undisclosed roles.

In September, Aneesh G. Menon confirmed he is part of the cast. In November, Narain confirmed he is part of the cast and would join the film in its final schedule, which will shoot Odiyan Manikyan's younger age. He plays the husband of Prabha and his scenes are with Mohanlal, Raj and Warrier. From the teaser trailer released in December, more of the cast was revealed confirming Kailash, Sana Althaf, and Sreejaya Nair. Sana plays Warrier's sister and Kailash's wife in the film. She said it was a difficult role to portray. The character has less screen time but is important in the script. Her character has transitioned from a young girl to an aged woman. Including Sana, many of the artists were prepared through a week long acting workshop. Atul Mongia served as the acting workshop director.

=== Filming ===
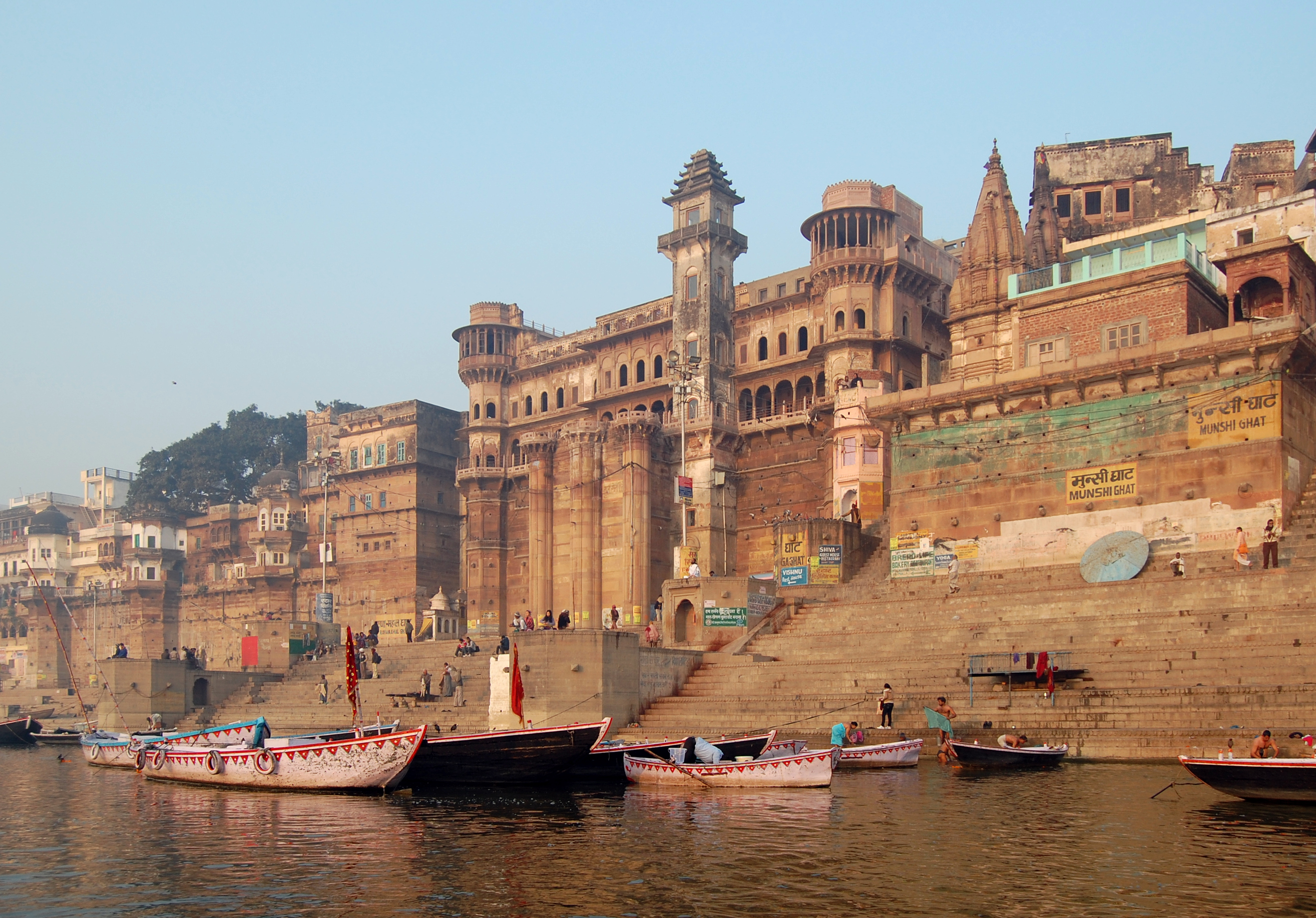
Film was shot in Varanasi

Principal photography began on 25 August 2017 in Varanasi, Uttar Pradesh. Mohanlal joined the film three days later. Some scenes were shot at the Assi Ghat with Mohanlal. Underwater action scenes were filmed in the Ganges River. In Varanasi, the film was extensively shot at the Havelis, the lanes, and the Ghats. Sreejaya Nair was also part of this schedule. In the film, Odiyan Manikyan spent 15 years in the sacred lands of Varanasi before returning to his native village, Thenkurissi. This period of his life, his older age, was filmed there. After completing, the crew left Varanasi by the end of the month and remaining was the scenes in Thenkurissi. Since the film wanted a period setting, the modern-day Thenkurissi was unsuitable for filming. Hence, the village was recreated in a 20-acre land in Mucheeri, Palakkad district. The second schedule in Palakkad was scheduled to begin on 6 September. Raj joined the film with Mohanlal and Warrier in the banks of Bharathappuzha on 9 September. A champion goat named Madurai Machadaiyan was used in the film.

The film's climax portions was filmed from 6 October in Palakkad, which was scheduled to last for 25 days. It was completed in 22 days on 27 October. By this schedule, Odiyan Manikyan's sexagenarian scenes were over and younger scenes were remaining to be shot. Climax scenes were shot in four locations. The climax fight sequence was filmed inside an Indian banyan tree beside the base of empty Walayar Dam. Action choreographer Peter Hein had around 60 days work in Odiyan. Hein later commented that Odiyan is his best work to date. The film contains five action scenes. After the second schedule, Mohanlal took break from filming for his physical transformation to become the younger Odiyan Manikyan. He began weight loss training under the supervision of a 22-member personal training team from France. After 51 days, he lost 18 kilograms (40 lb).

In meantime, the third schedule began by filming night scenes on 12 November in the absence of Mohanlal. The film completed 50 days shooting by 20 November. Mohanlal was to join the sets in December for the fourth schedule. However, the schedule had to be postponed for two more months due to scheduling conflicts with Raj's dates. Finally, the schedule commenced on 3 March 2018. Scenes featuring the younger ages of Odiyan Manikyan, Prabha and Ravunni were filmed in this part. Sana Althaf, Kailash, Narain, Siddique, and Innocent also joined the sets. It was also the final schedule, during which 1960–1970 period was filmed in Palakkad. Odiyan Manikyan's house was created in Kollengode, which is also the native place of screenwriter Harikrishnan.

Olappamanna Mana, an illam situated in Vellinezhi, served as a location in March. The song sequence featuring Mohanlal and Warrier was filmed at the Athirappilly Falls towards the end of the month. A temple-like set was created for the song under the waterfall. In early April, the scene where Odiyan Manikyan swam underwater across the Thenkurissi river was filmed. Manoj Joshi joined the sets in the month. Filming also took place in Vagamon, Idukki district. Principal photography was completed by 25 April after 123 days of shooting. Final schedule alone lasted 50 days. Filming was held in Malampuzha during the final wrap. Later, some pick-up footage was shot in May. After four months and post-production, an additional three-day brief schedule took place from 18 to 20 October in Kochi. Mohanlal also joined. The film in its entirety was completed in 145 days shooting.

=== Post-production ===
The film's post-production took place in Mumbai, Chennai and Kochi. Mumbai-based company NY VFXWAALA provided the visual effects for the film. Prasad Sutar was the visual effects supervisor. An early estimate for the cost of visual effects during pre-production was ₹7 crore. The film without the computer graphics and actions scenes were used during the dubbing process. The film was edited by Johnkutty. The length of the screenplay matched with the runtime of the film and none of the scenes in the screenplay were to be removed while editing. The final mixing of the songs was undergoing in August 2018. Final cut was 167 minutes long.

== Soundtrack ==
Odiyan

Soundtrack album by M. Jayachandran
- Released: 6 December 2018
- Recorded: 2017–2018
- Venues: Chennai, Mumbai
- Genre: Feature film soundtrack
- Language: Malayalam
- Label: Satyam Audios

M. Jayachandran chronology
Koode (2018)	Odiyan (2018)

The background score for the film was composed by Sam C. S., making his debut in Malayalam cinema. The film also features five songs composed by M. Jayachandran, the lyrics were written by Rafeeq Ahamed, Lakshmi Shrikumar, and Prabha Varma. "Kondoram", a duet from the film was sung by Shreya Ghoshal and Sudeep Kumar, and written by Ahamed. The other four songs were sung by Ghoshal, Shankar Mahadevan, M. G. Sreekumar, and Mohanlal each.

Jayachandran began composing the songs in June 2017. Composing took place at GreenPark hotel in Chennai. Mohanlal was also present during the time. Jayachandran composed the film's five songs in five days. For the song "Kondoram", lyrics were written after the tune was composed. Ahamed wrote the lines in a style resembling dialogue writing. Recording took place at Chennai (Musik Lounge Studio) and Mumbai. Shankar Mahadevan recorded the song "Nenjile" in August 2017.

For scoring, Menon chose Sam after he was impressed by his work in Vikram Vedha (2017). Sam joined the film after the songs were already composed. Scoring began in January 2018. Following his usual method, Sam composed the score beforehand based on the screenplay, contrary to the conventional method of scoring the filmed scenes during post-production. The musical score was then played while filming. Since the film had a period setting, old ethnic musical instruments of Kerala was utilised in the score. The film's theme music was chosen from four themes composed by Sam.

=== Track listing ===
Odiyan (Original Motion Picture Soundtrack)
No.	Title	Lyrics	Singer(s)	Length
1.	"Kondoram"	Rafeeq Ahamed	Shreya Ghoshal, Sudeep Kumar	5:00
2.	"Maanam"	Rafeeq Ahamed	Shreya Ghoshal	4:54
3.	"Enoruvan"	Prabha Varma	Mohanlal	2:59
4.	"Nenjile"	Lakshmi Shrikumar	Shankar Mahadevan	4:51
5.	"Muthappante"	Lakshmi Shrikumar	M. G. Sreekumar	3:50

== Release ==
Odiyan was released worldwide on 14 December 2018, released simultaneously with its dubbed versions in Tamil and Telugu languages. It was released in 42 countries via Qube Wire, the film had the largest release in Malayalam film history. The film met with mixed reviews.

=== Marketing ===
The concept art of the younger Odiyan Manikyan was revealed through a digital motion poster in July 2017. The official marketing campaign of the film began in October 2018 by unveiling a life-size statue of Odiyan Manikyan at PVR Cinemas in Lulu International Shopping Mall, Kochi. Statues was later distributed to various releasing theatres in Kerala. The team invited entries from public for a video making contest conceptualised on Odiyan, with prize money ranging from ₹25,000 to ₹1 lakh for the finalists. Odiyan, the mobile application of the film was released. Aashirvad Cinemas partnered with telecommunications service provider Bharti Airtel for merchandising Odiyan branded sim cards and would also conduct other offers and contests through various Airtel services, including free access to behind-the-scenes in Airtel TV application. A "global launch" function for the film was held on 8 December 2018 at Dubai Festival City.

== Reception ==
=== Box office ===
Odiyan earned the highest opening-day collection for a film at Kerala box office and for a Malayalam film at worldwide box office. It grossed a total of around ₹18.3 crore worldwide on day-1, with ₹9.76 crore from India (Kerala – ₹7.25 crore, Karnataka – 90 lakh, Andhra Pradesh and Telangana – 85 lakh, Tamil Nadu – 51 lakh, other states – 25 lakh) and ₹8.5 crore from overseas markets from all three languages. Odiyan registered the highest opening weekend (14 – 16 December) collection for a Malayalam film at domestic and worldwide box office, earning ₹21.5 crore from India, with a global total of ₹39.14 crore. The film had the highest opening weekend for a Malayalam film at Chennai (₹25.6 lakh from 66 shows) and Bangalore (₹1.33 crore). It is estimated to have grossed ₹14 crore from the Gulf Cooperation Council (GCC) territories in first three days. It grossed £44,479 (₹40 lakh) from 56 sites in the United Kingdom in its opening weekend. As of 27 December, the film has grossed more than ₹54 crore from worldwide ticket sales. As of December 2018, Odiyan was the second highest-grossing Malayalam film of the year, behind Kayamkulam Kochunni. As of 2021, Odiyan, with a gross collection of ₹1.26 crore, became the third highest-grossing Malayalam film in Tamil Nadu, behind Lucifer and Premam.

=== Accolades ===
Award	Category	Recipient	Ref
Kerala State Film Awards	Best Dubbing Artist	Shammi Thilakan (Voice dubbed for Prakash Raj )	
Vanitha Film Awards	Best Actor	Mohanlal	
Vanitha Film Awards	Best Actress	Manju Warrier	
Vanitha Film Awards	Best Music Director	M. Jayachandran	
Vanitha Film Awards	Best Singer - Female	Shreya Ghoshal	
Vanitha Film Awards	Best Duet Song	"Kondoram" (Sudeep Kumar, Shreya Ghoshal)	
Vanitha Film Awards	Best Lyricist	Rafeeq Ahammed	
