= Spirit (2012 film) =

- Theatrical release poster
- Directed by: Ranjith
- Written by: Ranjith
- Produced by: Antony Perumbavoor
- Starring: Mohanlal; Nandu; Kaniha; Shankar Ramakrishnan; Madhu; Lena; Kalpana; Govindankutty; Thilakan
- Narrated by: Siddique; Ranjith
- Cinematography: Venu
- Edited by: Sandeep Nandakumar
- Music by: Shahabaz Aman
- Production company: Aashirvad Cinemas
- Distributed by: Maxlab Entertainments
- Release date: 14 June 2012
- Running time: 145 minutes
- Country: India
- Language: Malayalam

Spirit is a 2012 Indian Malayalam-language satirical black comedy film written and directed by Ranjith. The film primarily focuses on the increasing habits of alcoholism in Kerala. It was produced by Antony Perumbavoor under the company Aashirvad Cinemas. The film stars Mohanlal in the lead role, while Kaniha, Shankar Ramakrishnan, Nandu, Kalpana, Madhu, Lena and Thilakan plays supporting roles. The film features music composed by Shahabaz Aman.

According to Ranjith, "the movie does not, in any way, advocate or proscribe alcohol. Spirit discusses the subject and examines what happens when a person, however intelligent, falls prey to an addiction, any addiction for that matter." The film released on 14 June 2012 to overwhelming positive reviews from critics. It also performed well at the box office and completed 125 days theatrical run in Kerala. The film won the National Film Award for Best Film on Other Social Issues and two Kerala State Film Awards for music. This movie is also noted as the last film of Thilakan released before his death on 24 September 2012

== Plot ==
Raghunandan was a former executive for the Bank of England who resigned his lucrative job because he was bored with nature of his work. For his next step he chose journalism, where he published many reports and directed several documentaries. His hard work led him to be the host of a widely viewed show named "Show the Spirit". However, his occupation doesn't diminish his passion for writing as he is working on an English novel. Raghunandan has a great reputation among others for being an intellect, and a polyglot. Although, he has little social life, is a vain narcissist, and a compulsive alcoholic.

It was his excessive drinking that resulted in his divorce some years back, but he shares a healthy friendship with his ex-wife Meera and her current husband Alexy. The couple has custody of Raghunandan's and Meera's son Aditya a.k.a. Sunny, who is deaf and mute. Captain Nambiar is his jovial next door neighbour. Raghunandan, however, is not really bothered about relationships, friendships or the norms of society and prefers to live life on his own terms. He rubs off some powerful politicians, who come to his TV show threatening dire consequences and offering bribes, the wrong way and does not regret it.

Raghunandan's fatal addiction towards alcohol takes a heavy toll on his personal and professional life. However, good sense dawns, albeit late, when he comes across a man who is worse than him because of his drinking problem. That is plumber Mani who is so drunk that he cannot distinguish between what is real and unreal. His character manifests all the worst characteristics of an alcoholic, including abusing his wife. Mani changes everything, bringing some meaning to Raghunandan's life.

== Cast ==
- Mohanlal as Raghunandan, a popular television host, an alcoholic.
- Nandu as Maniyan, an alcoholic plumber.
- Kaniha as Meera, Raghu's ex-wife.
- Shankar Ramakrishnan as Alexy, Meera's current husband and a close friend of Raghu.
- Kalpana as Pankajam, Maniyan's wife.
- Madhu as Captain Nambiar, Raghu's neighbour.
- Govindankutty as Benoy, News TV cameraman.
- Lena as ASP Supriya Raghavan.
- Thilakan as Mesthiri, Master of Maniyan
- Siddharth as Sameer, an alcoholic poet.
- Tini Tom as Johnson, the bartender.
- Suraj Venjaramoodu as Muralikrishnan, Minister for Tourism and Cultural Affairs (cameo appearance).
- Ganesh Kumar as Ashraf, CEO, News TV
- Jayaraj Warrier
- Vijay Menon
- Prajwal Prasad as Adithya / Sunny
- Jis Joy

== Production ==
Ranjith previously collaborated with Mohanlal on several successful films, including Devasuram, Aaraam Thampuran and Narasimham. Following a period of estrangement, reportedly after the commercial failure of Rock N' Roll, the two reunited for Spirit after a hiatus. Ranjith stated that he chose Mohanlal for the role because he considered him the most suitable actor for the character.

Talking about the film, Ranjith explains: "I believe there are two kinds of people in Kerala. On one hand, you have intelligent, successful people who become slaves to alcohol. They cannot function without it. As a result of it, their families suffer. Many of these alcoholics have marital problems and often, physically and emotionally, abuse their spouse. On the other, there are many others who are not teetotallers but they don't need booze 24X7 to keep them in good spirits," says Ranjith.

After the success of Indian Rupee, Ranjith announced his new film Leela which was an adaptation of Unni. R's short story of the same name. But the project was postponed and Ranjith began the works of Spirit. According to Shankar Ramakrishnan, who was to play the lead in Leela, "Leela has a landscape and a mindscape and the film was postponed as it requires us [the crew] to travel from Kottayam to Wayanad." Ranjith completed the film's script in a short time and the whole film, including post-production works, was completed in about a month. The principal photography of the film started in March 2012 and was completed by mid-April. The film was shot mainly from Kochi and the "Casa Rosa resort" in the film was set in Choice house in Kochi. It was produced by Antony Perumbavoor under the banner Aashirvad Cinemas. Prakash Raj was initially cast for the role of Alexy but he opted out reportedly due to payment issues. He was replaced by Shankar Ramakrishnan who makes his debut as an actor.

== Soundtrack ==
Spirit

Soundtrack album by Shahabaz Aman
- Released: 2012
- Genre: Film
- Length: 13:35
- Label: Satyam Audios
- Producer: Shahabaz Aman

Shahabaz Aman chronology
Indian Rupee	Spirit	Bavuttiyude Namathil

The film features songs composed by Shahabaz Aman and written by Rafeeq Ahammed. The audio released on 12 June 2012. Mathrubhumi managing director M. P. Veerendra Kumar released the CD by handing over the CD to actor Mammootty. Mathrubhumi Music and Sathyam Audios were jointly released the music.

All lyrics are written by Rafeeq Ahamed; all music is composed by Shahabaz Aman.

No.	Title	Artist(s)	Length
1.	"Ee Chillayil"	K. J. Yesudas	3:43
2.	"Mazhakondu Mathram"	Vijay Yesudas	3:34
3.	"Maranamethunna"	Unni Menon	3:25
4.	"Mazhakondu Mathram"	Gayatri Asokan	3:33

== Release ==
A premiere show was held on 10 June 2012 in Chennai where it garnered good responses. Noted filmmakers and writers such as Priyadarshan, M. P. Virendra Kumar and Anjali Menon were all praise for the film with special mention to Mohanlal's performance.

Originally set to release on 7 June 2012, Spirit opened in more than 100 theatres a week later, on 14 June 2012 with good results. The film was screened in 84 centres in Kerala while the Chennai, Mumbai and Bangalore sector had the film in around 20 centres. The movie was reportedly well received by the audiences who opined that it is a class affair with a fine script from the director. Most of them suggested that it gives a good message to the youth who is addicted to alcohol.

The film was screened in front of several politicians and ministers such as K. Babu, Ramesh Chennithala, N. Sakthan, Mullakkara Ratnakaran, A. P. Abdullakutty, P. C. Vishnunath and Dominic Presentation on 21 June 2012 at Sreekumar Theatre, Thiruvananthapuram. The show was presided over by about fifty legislative assembly members and other politicians who were all praise for the film. P. C. Vishnunath suggested the Ministry of Entertainment exempt the film from entertainment taxes stating that the film carries a good message. In late-June, the decision to exempt the film from the tax was announced in the assembly by Minister for Panchayats and Social Welfare M. K. Muneer. "The film created an awareness on social issues faced by the society due to increase in liquor consumption," M. K. Muneer said. The Minister also congratulated the film's crew including Mohanlal and Ranjith for presenting a value oriented film to Malayalam film industry. Central minister Vayalar Ravi has written to the Ministry of Broadcasting to screen the film all over India through Doordarshan television channels.

=== Accusation of plagiarism ===
Abdul Azeez, a short filmmaker and assistant director, has accused that Spirit is plagiarised from his short film My Hero But Big Zero. He adds that Plumber Maniyan, the character played by Nandu in Spirit, was entirely based on the protagonist of his film.

== Reception ==
=== Critical reception ===
Performance of Nandu as Plumber Maniyan was particularly praised.

Paresh C Palicha of Rediff.com gave the film a rating of 3 out of 5 stars and said, "Spirit is not flawless but is recommended for the sincere effort by the cast and the crew." In regards to Mohanlal's performance, the critic said: "Spirit belongs to Mohanlal who brings to the table a kind of vulnerability hidden behind the arrogant exterior. There are occasions when the mask of arrogance falls away and Mohanlal has the expertise to handle such situations with élan."

A review by Sify.com said, "If you are not expecting a high voltage drama stuffed with the usual share of emotions, Spirit can turn out to be a nice experience. It may not bowl you over like some of Ranjith's brilliant movies and seems to be a bit too long, at nearly two hours and thirty minutes. Still, this one has been made with noble intentions."

The film received negative reviews as well. Parvathy Anoop of Deccan Herald stated, "There are too many characters and side stories, some of which are not relevant at all. Also, it [the film] has too many disconnects. Some ideas are introduced and left incomplete, which is a shame. All the drinking, smoking and swearing in this movie seem to have gone waste as it does not drive the message strongly. Mohanlal, as always, has done his part well, but Ranjith had set his own bar high with movies like Pranchiyettan and Indian Rupee and this one does not come anywhere close to that league." Dalton L, in his review for Deccan Chronicle, criticised Mohanlal's acting: "Mohanlal acts like he's never really been sloshed in his entire life; the only indications to the contrary being his trembling fingers, the clichéd dazed look, and an occasional stagger. He should learn a thing or two from Thilakan's sterling performance. Kalpana and Nandu too get real." He gave the film a rating of three in a scale of five.

Sreenath Nair of The Hindu said that the film "lacks punch and kick". He praised the film's art direction and acting by Mohanlal and Nandu but was critical about the film's cinematography, dialogues and background score. He particularly criticised the statements about fashionable drinking and the attributes of the rich, saying, "these could have avoided by an intelligent director." He also criticised the slow pace of the film, saying, "as the film moves towards the climax comes the spoilsport device, a television show."

=== Box office ===
Sify called it a box office super hit. It completed a theatrical run of more than 125 days in Kerala.

== Awards ==
60th National Film Awards

- Best Film on Social Issues

Kerala State Film Awards

- Best Lyricist – Rafeeq Ahammed (Mazhakondu Mathram)
- Best Male Singer – Vijay Yesudas

2nd South Indian International Movie Awards

- Best Actor - Mohanlal
- Best Actor in a Supporting Role – Nandu
- Best Male Playback Singer – Vijay Yesudas for "Mazhakondu Mathram"
- Nominated—Best Film
- Nominated—Best Cinematographer - Venu
- Nominated—Best Music Director - Shahabaz Aman
- Nominated—Best Lyricist – Rafeeq Ahmad for "Mazha Kondu"
- Nominated—Best Male Playback Singer – K. J. Yesudas for "Ee Chillayil"
- Nominated—Best Male Debutant – Shankar Ramakrishnan

60th Filmfare Awards South

- Best Lyricist – Rafeeq Ahmed for "Maranamethunna Nerathu"
- Best Playback Singer – Male – Vijay Yesudas for "Mazhakondu Mathram"

Asianet Film Awards

- Best Actor – Mohanlal
- Best Supporting Actor - Male - Shankar Ramakrishnan
- Best Supporting Actor - Female - Lena
- Best Scriptwriter – Ranjith

Asiavision Movie Awards

- Best Actor – Mohanlal
- Best Director – Ranjith
