= Maxlab Cinemas and Entertainments =

Indian film production and distribution company

- Type: Private
- Industry: Film distribution
- Founded: 23 October 2008; 17 years ago in Kochi, Kerala
- Founder: Mohanlal
- Headquarters: Kochi, India
- Key people: Mohanlal; Antony Perumbavoor; K. C. Babu
- Products: Motion pictures

Maxlab Cinemas and Entertainments is an Indian film distribution and production company established in 2009 by actor-producer Mohanlal, producer Antony Perumbavoor and industrialist K. C. Babu. Since then, it has distributed several films in Malayalam and other Indian languages. The company is a regular distributor of films produced by Aashirvad Cinemas and Tamil films.

== Filmography ==
Year	Film	Language	Production House	Ref.
2009	Sagar Alias Jacky Reloaded	Malayalam	Aashirvad Cinemas	
2009	Bhramaram	Malayalam	Yavonne Entertainment Co.	
2009	Angel John	Malayalam	Creative Team	
2009	Evidam Swargamanu	Malayalam	Aashirvad Cinemas	
2010	Janakan	Malayalam	Sathgamaya Productions	
2010	Mummy & Me	Malayalam	JJithin Arts	
2010	Shikkar	Malayalam	Sreeraj Cinema	
2010	Kandahar	Malayalam	Zoe Estabe Moviez, Pranavam Arts International	
2011	China Town	Malayalam	Aashirvad Cinemas	
2011	Vaadamalli	Malayalam	Zoe Estabe Moviez	
2011	Pranayam	Malayalam	Fragnent Nature Cinema	
2011	Doctor Love	Malayalam	JJithin Arts	
2011	Snehaveedu	Malayalam	Aashirvad Cinemas	
2011	Innanu Aa Kalyanam	Malayalam	–	
2012	Casanovva	Malayalam	Confident Group, Aashirvad Cinemas	
2012	Grandmaster	Malayalam	UTV Motion Pictures	
2012	Spirit	Malayalam	Aashirvad Cinemas	
2013	Lokpal	Malayalam	Happy & Ruby Cinemas	
2013	Ladies and Gentleman	Malayalam	Confident Group, Aashirvad Cinemas	
2013	Drishyam	Malayalam	Aashirvad Cinemas	
2014	Jilla	Tamil	Super Good Films	
2014	Mr. Fraud	Malayalam	AVA Productions	
2014	Aamayum Muyalum	Malayalam	Full House Entertainment	
2015	Rasam	Malayalam	Group Ten Entertainments Pvt. Ltd, Chaya Films	
2015	Ennum Eppozhum	Malayalam	Aashirvad Cinemas	
2015	Lailaa O Lailaa	Malayalam	Finecut Entertainments	
2015	Papanasam	Tamil	Wide Angle Creations	
2015	Loham	Malayalam	Aashirvad Cinemas	
2015	Kanal	Malayalam	Abaam Movies, Aashirvad Cinemas	
2016	Kabali	Tamil	V Creations	
2016	Vismayam	Malayalam	Varahi Chalana Chitram	
2016	Janatha Garage (Dubbed)	Malayalam	Mythri Movie Makers	
2016	Oppam	Malayalam	Aashirvad Cinemas	
2017	Careful	Malayalam	Wide Angel Creations	
2017	Velaiilla Pattadhari 2	Tamil	V Creations, Wunderbar Films	
2017	Velipadinte Pustakam	Malayalam	Aashirvad Cinemas	
2017	Villain	Malayalam	Rockline Entertainments Pvt Ltd.	
2018	Odiyan	Malayalam	Aashirvad Cinemas	
2019	Lucifer	Malayalam	Aashirvad Cinemas	
2019	Ittymaani: Made in China	Malayalam	Aashirvad Cinemas	
2019	Asuran	Tamil	V Creations	
2019	Android Kunjappan Version 5.25	Malayalam	Moonshot Entertainments	
2021	Marakkar: Arabikadalinte Simham	Malayalam	Aashirvad Cinemas	
2024	Malaikottai Vaaliban	Malayalam	John & Mary Creative; Century Films; Saregama; Amen Movie Monastery	

== See also ==
- Aashirvad Cinemas
- Mohanlal
- Antony Perumbavoor
