= Ittymaani: Made in China =

2019 film directed by Jibi Joju

- Theatrical release poster
- Directed by: Jibi-Joju
- Written by: Jibi-Joju
- Produced by: Antony Perumbavoor
- Starring: Mohanlal; Radhika Sarathkumar; K. P. A. C. Lalitha; Honey Rose; Siddique
- Cinematography: Shaji Kumar
- Edited by: Sooraj E. S.
- Music by: Songs: Deepak Dev; Kailas Menon; 4 Musics; Score: Deepak Dev
- Production company: Aashirvad Cinemas
- Distributed by: Maxlab Cinemas and Entertainments; Tricolor Entertainment
- Release date: 6 September 2019
- Running time: 158 minutes
- Country: India
- Language: Malayalam
- Budget: ₹12 crore
- Box office: est. ₹35.4 crore

Ittymaani: Made in China is a 2019 Indian Malayalam-language comedy drama film written and directed by Jibi-Joju (in their directorial debut). Produced by Antony Perumbavoor through the company Aashirvad Cinemas, the film stars Mohanlal in the title role, along with an ensemble cast including Radhika Sarathkumar, K. P. A. C. Lalitha, Honey Rose, Siddique, Sijoy Varghese, Vinu Mohan, Kailash, Swasika, Aju Varghese, Salim Kumar, Hareesh Kanaran and Dharmajan Bolgatty. The original songs were composed by 4 Musics, Kailas Menon, and Deepak Dev and background score by Dev. The story is set in Kunnamkulam, Thrissur and revolves around Ittymaani, a Chinese-born Indian who moved to his homeland at age 10 and is now engaged in selling knockoff products among other businesses.

The film began principal photography on 24 April 2019 and was concluded in July, shot mainly in Kerala and a few scenes in China. Ittymaani: Made in China was released in theatres worldwide on 6 September 2019 to mixed reviews from critics and became commercial success at box office.

== Plot ==
Ittymaani was born and raised in China until age 10 before moving to India. He now runs a Chinese restaurant and a catering service in hometown Kunnamkulam, and owns an ambulance, whose driver Sugunan is his best buddy. Although, his main business is selling knockoff products, a family business started by his grandfather in China. Ittymaani takes commission for any money transaction he does, including when his mother Theyyama was hospitalised for gallstone treatment.

Ittymaani takes a contract to build a church bell. He is also a member of the church committee. Meanwhile, Ittymaani has an arranged marriage fixed with Jessy, a doctor in London, through matchmaker Paulinos. However, when Paulinos asks for brokerage, Ittymaani demands commission from it, an argument ensues between them that ends in Ittymaani ditching Jessy. Paulinos turns Jessy's brother Joji against him by telling fabricated anecdotes of Ittymaani making fun of Joji and emasculating him.

Current priest's tenure is over and the new bell is inaugurating on his farewell function. While swinging the rope, the bell breaks and falls down right in front of the priest, who blackout. Ittymaani receives rebuke for making counterfeit bell and is dismissed from church committee. Later, Sugunan finds out that their employee cheated them by providing faulty bell by taking bribe from Joji. Meanwhile, the new priest is John (Joppan), whom Ittymaani recalls as an inmate while attending an alcohol rehabilitation centre some years ago. They come into an understanding to not reveal Joppan's past in exchange of reinstating Ittymaani into church committee.

Annamma, Ittymaani's neighbour and Theyyama's friend lives alone estranged by her children—Alex, Ajo, and Betty. Annamma invites them home to commemorate their father's death anniversary, but none of them shows up, as usual. Ittymaani sympathises Annamma and meets each of them along with her, getting promises to visit her on Christmas. Annamma is hospitalised after a cardiac arrest but her children refuse to cancel their holidaying in Munnar for visiting her. At Munnar, Alex receives a phone call informing that Annamma died. They arrive at their family home only to find out that their mother has married Ittymaani. This causes an altercation between Annamma, Ittymaani and her children.

Their parish condemns Ittymaani and Annamma. Ittymaani secretly reveals to Joppan that the marriage is a drama they set up while at the hospital with the knowledge of Theyyama. Annamma has not partitioned her assets, so a marriage would compromise her children's right to her wealth. It forces them to be with Annamma. Alex, Ajo, and Betty seeks the advice of Joji to get rid of Ittymaani. Following that, Betty makes sexual misconduct allegation against Ittymaani. But the plan fails as their cook had a recorded footage of Betty while the alleged incident happened. Annamma slaps Betty and Ittymaani takes full control of the house from that point onward.

On consulting an attorney they come to know that Annamma can dispose her assets to whoever she wants without any liability to children. It compels them to offer Ittymaani money in exchange for leaving their mother. But Ittymaani tells them that he may leave only when she wants him to leave. So, they plot a new idea to persuade her to make him leave. They starts showing intense affection to their mother, hoping she would leave him as she is getting back their love. Annamma is happy with the care they are giving her.

While observing their father's death anniversary, they brings attorney with documents to dissolve their marriage, believing she would sign. Foreseeing it, Ittymaani and Annamma stages another drama, that they are expecting a child, so he cannot leave her. It ensues a fight between Ittymaani, Alex and Ajo. Annamma tries stopping them, but Alex knocks her down. Her heart problem reemerges. She is hospitalised, needing an emergency surgery. But her children refuses to sign the consent form. Ittymaani cannot sign as they are not legally married. He has no choice but to reveal the truth.

Knowing that Ittymaani and Annamma staged the marriage for regaining their forsaken love, her children's heart melts down and feels remorse. Later it is seen Annamma has recovered her health and reunited with her now affectionate children and their family. Ittymaani marries Jessy and reconcile with Joji. It is revealed that Ittymaani was donating commissions levied by him to an old age home.

== Cast ==
- Mohanlal in a dual role as:
  - Ittymaani (Son)
    - Niranjan Kannan as Young Ittymaani
  - Ittymaathan (Father)
- Radhika Sarathkumar as Plamoottil Annamma
- Siddique as Fr.John Paul / Joppan, Ittymaani's best friend
- Honey Rose as Jessy Pothen
- K. P. A. C. Lalitha as Theyyamma, Ittymaani's mother
  - Madhuri Braganza as Young Theyyama
- Aju Varghese as Sugunan
- Salim Kumar as Mapranam Varkey
- Hareesh Kanaran as Joji Pothen, Jessy's brother and Ittymaani's brother-law
- Dharmajan Bolgatty as Sainu
- Sijoy Varghese as Alex
- Vinu Mohan as Ajo
- Kailash as Xavier
- Swasika as Betty, Xavier's wife
- Viviya Santh as Ajo's wife
- Komal Sharma as Alex's wife
- Johny Antony as Advocate Tharyan Kurian
- Ashokan as Dr. Asif Moopan
- Aristo Suresh as Kapyar Pranchi
- Nandu as Roy Mathew (Cameo)
- Sreejith Ravi as Advocate Jerry Idikkula (Cameo)
- Saju Navodaya as Mooshari Bhaskaran
- Thushara Pammu as Sugunan's wife
- Rajesh Paravoor as Broker Paulinos
- Sekhar Menon as Achayan (Cameo)
- Sunil Sukhada as Fr. Chandykunju
- Anjana Appukuttan as Kurian's wife
- Krishnaprasad as Doctor
- Saju Kodiyan as Babu, Registrar
- Sethu Lakshmi as Mother Superior
- Sarasa Balussery as Inmate at old-age-home
- Savithri Sreedharan as Inmate at old-age-home
- Chali Pala as Kunjachan, Ittymani's relative
- Yamuna as Joji's and Jessy's mother
- Antony Perumbavoor as Hospital attender (Cameo appearance)
- Jibi Joju as Roadside vendors (Cameo appearance)
- Mammootty as Adv. Nandagopal Marar (archive footage, cameo appearance)
- Sukumaran as Avaraachan, Annamma's late husband (photo)

== Production ==
=== Development ===
The duo Jibi and Joju made their directorial debut with Ittymaani: Made in China, produced by Aashirvad Cinemas. Previously they had worked as assistant and associate directors in Malayalam films. It was while working in Vellimoonga (2014) that they decided to work together as a director duo. They came up with the subject of Ittymaani: Made in China in January 2016. Actors were undecided while conceiving the story. They approached Mohanlal when they had the chance to meet him in May 2016 while working as chief associate directors on his film Munthirivallikal Thalirkkumbol. It was on that set that they first told him about Ittymaani: Made in China and the full story was narrated to him during the final dubbing work of Munthirivallikal Thalirkkumbol. Jibi and Joju briefed the screenplay to Mohanlal in January 2017 and told him beforehand that it was not written with him in mind and may require rework. Mohanlal too felt that when heard and suggested changes.

They reworked the screenplay in five months and met him again at the sets of Velipadinte Pusthakam, but Mohanlal recommended them to cast someone else for the role as the film will delay if waited for him as he had committed multiple big-budget projects at that time. But Jibi and Joju had set their mind to proceed only if Mohanlal was available. Hence, Mohanlal directed them to discuss the matter with producer Antony Perumbavoor. Antony liked the reworked screenplay and called for a final meeting in October 2018. Mohanlal approved the screenplay and the project was green-lit when Antony decided to produce the film. The film was officially announced by Mohanlal through his social media handles on 22 October 2018. Initially, Jibi and Joju approached some screenwriters to write the screenplay, but they declined as the project was not approved at that time. Later the duo decided to write it themselves. Mohanlal suggested changes to include a message in the story and sanctioned the screenplay after several drafts.

=== Filming ===
The pooja ceremony of the film was held at Kochi on 24 April 2019 followed by the start of principal photography. Characters speak Thrissur slang in the film. Part of the film was shot at St. Stanislaus Forane Church, Mala, where Mohanlal, Salim Kumar, Aristo Suresh and Johny Antony performed the traditional Kerala Christian woman's dance Margamkali along with 512 artistes between the ages of 3 and 65. It is featured as part of a church fund raiser for constructing houses in the film. Prasanna Sujit was the film's dance choreographer, but the Margamkali was choreographed by actress Swasika. Filming underwent in Ernakulam and Alappuzha locales in June 2019. Four days filming was conducted in China in July 2019. Ittymaani's father's portions were filmed there. One of the stills released from the set featured him along with Tai Chi fighters as part of a song sequence. Ittymaani's childhood was filmed in China and the look of old China was needed for that. Hence, the scenes were filmed in studios in China. Filming was concluded in that month and entered post-production.

== Soundtrack ==
Ittymaani: Made in China

Soundtrack album by 4 Musics, Kailas Menon, Deepak Dev
- Released: 16 September 2019
- Recorded: 2019
- Venues: Kochi, Mumbai
- Studios: My Studio; Wow and Flutter Studios; Studio 6/8; NHQ Studios; Dev's Wonderland
- Genre: Feature film soundtrack
- Languages: Malayalam, Mandarin
- Label: Goodwill Entertainments
External audio
- Audio Jukebox on YouTube

4 Musics chronology
Ottam (2019)	Ittymaani: Made in China (2019)	Brother's Day (2019)

Deepak Dev chronology
Lucifer (2019)	Ittymaani: Made in China (2019)	Ganagandharvan (2019)

Kailas Menon chronology
Theevandi (2018)	Ittymaani: Made in China (2019)	Finals (2019)

The original soundtrack consists of five tracks composed by the ensemble group 4 Musics (two songs), Deepak Dev (two songs), and Kailas Menon (one songs), with lyrics for the songs written by Santhosh Varma, Liu Shuang (Mandarin lyrics), and Manu Manjith. The background score was composed by Deepak Dev. The soundtrack album was released by the label Goodwill Entertainments on 16 September 2019.

=== Track listing ===
Ittymaani: Made in China (Original Motion Picture Soundtrack)
No.	Title	Lyrics	Music	Singer(s)	Length
1.	"Bomma Bomma"	Santhosh Varma, Liu Shuang	4 Musics	M. G. Sreekumar, Vrinda Shameek Ghosh, Master Adithyan, Liu Shuang, Teresa Rose Geo	4:14
2.	"Kunjade Ninte Manassil"	Santhosh Varma	4 Musics	Shankar Mahadevan, Biby Mathew, Sulfiq L., Devika Sooryaprakash, Vrinda Shameek Ghosh, Haritha Balakrishnan	4:31
3.	"Kando Kando"	Santhosh Varma	Deepak Dev	Mohanlal, Vaikom Vijayalakshmi	4:06
4.	"Vennilavu Peythalinja"	Manu Manjith	Kailas Menon	Najim Arshad, K. S. Harisankar, Devika Sooryaprakash, Manjari	3:57
5.	"Gimme Money"	Santhosh Varma	Deepak Dev	Anwar Sadath, Aloshya, Ajeesh Anto, Vishnu Krishnan, Yadhu S. Marar	2:30

== Release ==
Ittymaani: Made in China was released in theatres worldwide on 6 September 2019, ahead of the week of Onam in Kerala. In Kerala, the film was released in nearly 250 screens. The film was made available for online streaming on Amazon Prime Video.

== Reception ==
=== Box office ===
Ittymaani: Made in China grossed ₹2.05 crore in the opening day in Kerala. In the overseas opening weekend (6 – 8 September), the film earned US$378,727 from 47 screens in the United Arab Emirates, US$59,371 (₹42.57 lakh) from 40 screens in the United States, £35,137 (₹30.93 lakh) from 91 screens in the United Kingdom, A$60,317 (₹29.64 lakh) from 22 screens in Australia, and NZ$10,751 (₹4.96 lakh) from 4 screens in New Zealand. In two weeks, it grossed £61,269 (₹54.59 lakh) in the UK, A$81,375 (₹40 lakh) in Australia, and NZ$20,545 (₹9.39 lakh) in New Zealand, $513,544 in the UAE and $9,100 in Portugal. In four weeks, it earned US$105,092 (₹74.28 lakh) in the US and €3,545 (₹2.74 lakh) in Germany.

=== Critical response ===
Upon release, the film received generally mixed reviews from critics. G. Ragesh of Malayala Manorama rated 3 out of 5 stars and wrote "Ittymaani Made in China has an interesting plot that appeals to audience all over the world". Sangeetha Lakshmi of Mathrubhumi wrote that the film is a "feel good family entertainer". Writing for Indian Express Malayalam, Dhanya K. Vilayil wrote that Ittymaani: Made in China is a festival celebration movie, with all the right ingredients for the fans to celebrate. Behindwoods.com critic wrote: "'Ittymaani: Made in China' is entertaining with Mohanlal - KPAC Lalitha's endearing performances and humorous moments", and rated 2.75 out of 5. Rating 2.5 out of 5, The New Indian Express stated that the film is "all about loving your parents" and it "has one of the most daring interval blocks in recent memory".

However, writing for Huffington Post, Neelima Menon said, "At a time when Malayalam cinema has come a long way in terms of craft, concepts, technology and ideas, a film like Ittimani is a huge step back—more so when you have a superstar like Mohanlal anchoring it". Vidya Nair of Deccan Chronicle rated 2 out of 5 and wrote: "a weak attempt to narrate a good subject that might only survive due to the performances of some ace actors." Deepa Antony of The Times of India also rated 2 out of 5 and wrote: "'Ittymani :Made in China' is a weak story and a weaker script that even the Mohanlal cannot save." The Indian Express rated 1.5 out of 5 and wrote that "the script has no originality or fresh ideas, it is Mohanlal who gives everything to make even a dull scene tolerable." The Hindu critic felt that the "latter half, where the social message gets delivered, is almost like an unending television soap".
