= Evidam Swargamanu =

Ividam Swargamanu
- Poster
- Directed by: Rosshan Andrrews
- Written by: James Albert
- Produced by: Antony Perumbavoor
- Starring: Mohanlal; Lalu Alex; Thilakan; Sreenivasan; Shankar; Lakshmi Rai
- Cinematography: R. Diwakaran
- Edited by: Ranjan Abraham
- Music by: Gopi Sundar
- Production company: Aashirvad Cinemas
- Distributed by: Maxlab Cinemas and Entertainments
- Release date: 25 December 2009
- Running time: 166 minutes
- Country: India
- Language: Malayalam
- Budget: ₹ 4 crore

Ividam Swargamanu (transl. This is heaven) is a 2009 Indian Malayalam-language drama film directed by Rosshan Andrrews and written by James Albert. It was produced by Antony Perumbavoor under the company Aashirvad Cinemas. The film stars Mohanlal, Lalu Alex, Thilakan, Sreenivasan, Shankar and Lakshmi Rai. The music was composed by Gopi Sunder. It tells the story of Mathews, a farmer who has to fight the real estate mafia over selling his farmland which he refuses to give away.

Ividam Swargamanu was released on 25 December 2009. The film won the Kerala State Film Award for Best Film with Popular Appeal and Aesthetic Value. Also, the film was a commercial success.

== Plot ==
The movie narrates the tale of a diligent farmer named Mathews and his struggle against a land mafia that seeks to seize his lands. Hardworking farmers Mathews and his father Jeremias have developed a dairy farm that can house many cattle. Together with his father, mother Elsamma and her sister Rahelamma, Mathews has a quiet, contented life.

Problems arise when Mathews' farm is eyed by Aluva Chandy, a powerful real estate dealer and land mafia, who tries to persuade Mathews to sell the land to Chandy so that he may flip it and resell it to a Mumbai-based businessman for a sizable profit. However, Mathews is unwilling to comply to Chandy's demands and complains to the police about Chandy's intrusion into his property. Instead, the policeman works as Chandy's agent, leaving Mathews in a hopeless predicament.

Chandy's false promise of establishing a township enticed the locals to support Chandy. They try to persuade Mathews to sell the property, but he refuses, and the other villagers started hating him for it. Mathews and his father are adamant about staying in the community although several of his friends and neighbours opt to leave by selling their farm to Chandy. The court appoints a one-man committee to visit, submit, and report after Aluva Chandy fabricates many civil complaints against Mathews and his dairy farm using his neighbours for nuisance causes by the farm. When attorney Sunitha visits the farm, she considers it to be quite satisfactory and provides a report to the court. She gets fired from her team by her senior, acting on Chandy's orders. In order to get Jeremias from being imprisoned, several government agencies are now bringing legal claims against Mathews' farm, including allegations of financial irregularities and failure to return the loan.

A news reporter named Betsy tries to broadcast on her station about the difficulties Mathews is having, but the channel's administrators prevent her from doing so. Sunitha now takes up Mathews' cause, petitions the court on his behalf, and is successful in appointing an "amicus curiae" ("friend of the court") to investigate shady real estate activities in the State. An effective lawyer named Advocate Prabalan is chosen to serve as the "amicus curiae." The remaining portion of the narrative describes how Mathews, with Prabalan's assistance, uncovers the corruption of numerous government agencies and finally wins back his land.

== Cast ==
- Mohanlal as Mathews Jermias
- Lalu Alex as Aluva Chandy
- Thilakan as Jeremias
- Sreenivasan as Adv. Prabhalan
- Lakshmi Rai as Adv. Sunitha
- Shankar as Sudheer
- Kaviyoor Ponnamma as Elsamma Jermias
- Sukumari as Rahelamma
- Baiju Ezhupunna as Jose
- Sreehari as Thomas, agricultural officer
- Jagathy Sreekumar as Bhuvanendran
- Maniyanpilla Raju as Adv. Jayaraj
- Innocent as Chandrachoodan Kaimal, Revenue Secretary
- Priyanka Nair as Betsy Varghese
- Lakshmi Gopalaswamy as Maria
- Shobha Mohan as Nirmala teacher
- Sadiq as Sudhakaran
- Anoop Chandran as Babu
- Mukundan as Adv. Issac
- Idavela Babu as Peethambaran, village officer
- Babu Namboothiri as Justice Sukumaran Marar
- Manikandan Pattambi as Antony
- T. P. Madhavan as Stephen Edakochi, Tourism Minister
- Lakshmi Priya as Deenamma
- Chembil Ashokan as Charlie
- Geetha Vijayan as District Collector Sindhu Pradeep IAS
- Prem Prakash as Jacob
- Chali Pala as CI Prabhakaran
- Balachandran Chullikkadu as Elias, party leader
- Kunjan as Pappachan, councillor
- Sudheer Karamana as Palkaran Lakshmanan
- Poojappura Radhakrishnan as Abdu, tea shop owner
- Nandhu Podhuval as Raju
- Bindu Murali as Maria's mother
- Omana Ouseph as Shantha, Sunitha's mother
- Manoj Nair as tea shop man
- Pradeep Chandran as Shibu Areekutty
- Assim Jamal as Jayadevan
- Rajesh Sharma as Zachariah, Channel Cameraman
- Meena Ganesh as tea shop owner
- Manjusha Sajish

== Production ==
The film was made on a budget of ₹4 crore. The crew bought cattle and 15 acres of land to build the farm of protagonist. Vegetable cultivation was initiated 6 months prior to production with instructions from agricultural department.

== Soundtrack ==
Though the movie did not feature any songs, a promotional album was released by Manorama Music. The album features two songs composed by Mohan Sithara, with lyrics by Bichu Thirumala and Kaithapram.

Track #	Song	Singer(s)	Lyrics
1	"Kurisinte Vazhiye"	K. J. Yesudas	Bichu Thirumala
2	"Velutha Muthe"	M. G. Sreekumar	Kaithapram

== Awards ==
Kerala State Film Awards

- Best Film with Popular Appeal and Aesthetic Value – Antony Perumbavoor (producer), Rosshan Andrrews (director)

Kerala Film Critics Association Awards

- Best Film
- Best Director – Rosshan Andrrews
- Best Screenplay – James Albert

Asianet Film Awards

- Best Actor – Mohanlal
- Best Villain – Lalu Alex
- Most Popular Actress – Lakshmi Rai

Amrita Mathrubhumi Film Awards

- Best Villain – Lalu Alex
- Most Popular Actress – Lakshmi Rai

Atlas State Film Critics Award

- Best Film
- Best Screenplay – James Albert

Vanitha Film Awards

- Most Popular Actor – Mohanlal
- Best Screenplay – James Albert

Kairali TV – World Malayali Council Film Award

- Best Film
- Best Actor – Mohanlal
- Best Director – Rosshan Andrrews
