= Oppam =

2016 Indian film by Priyadarshan

- Theatrical release poster
- Directed by: Priyadarshan
- Screenplay by: Priyadarshan
- Story by: Govind Vijayan (credited for "story idea")
- Produced by: Antony Perumbavoor
- Starring: Mohanlal; Samuthirakani
- Cinematography: N. K. Ekambaram
- Edited by: M. S. Ayyappan Nair
- Music by: Songs: 4 Musics; Score: Ron Ethan Yohann
- Production company: Aashirvad Cinemas
- Distributed by: Maxlab Cinemas and Entertainments
- Release date: 8 September 2016 (India)
- Running time: 157 minutes
- Country: India
- Language: Malayalam
- Box office: est.₹65 crore

Oppam (transl. Along) is a 2016 Indian Malayalam-language neo-noir crime thriller film directed by Priyadarshan from a story by Govind Vijayan. The film, produced Antony Perumbavoor for Aashirvad Cinemas, stars Mohanlal and Samuthirakani in lead roles.The songs were composed by the group 4 Musics, while the score was composed by Ron Ethan Yohann. The cinematography and editing were handled by N. K. Ekambaram and M. S. Ayyappan Nair.

Regular collaborators Mohanlal and Priyadarshan were expected to work on a film in 2015, but it was postponed before principal photography began until the following year. Priyadarshan decided to make another film with Mohanlal, and began looking at screenplays. They wanted a break from their usual comedy films. Priyadarshan agreed on a short story by Govind Vijayan which was suggested by Mohanlal. The director developed a plot and screenplay, which was on its final draft in February 2016. The film began principal photography in March and ended in June; it was filmed in Kochi, Ooty, Vagamon, Thiruvananthapuram, and Idukki.

Oppam was released in India on 8 September 2016 and internationally on 21 September 2016 where it received positive reviews from critics with praise for Mohanlal's performance and script. The film was box office success earning above ₹52 crore worldwide. It became the third-highest-grossing Malayalam film of all time and the second-highest-grossing Malayalam film of the year, behind Pulimurugan. At the Filmfare Awards South, the film was nominated in five categories (including Best Film, Best Director for Priyadarshan and Best Actor for Mohanlal) and won in the categories of Best Lyricist (for Madhu Vasudevan) and Best Male Playback Singer (for M. G. Sreekumar). It was remade in Kannada as Kavacha (2019) and in Hindi as Haiwaan (2026).

== Plot ==
Jayaraman is a blind lift operator and caretaker living in Kochi. Despite his visual impairment, he possesses heightened senses of hearing, smell, and touch, and is skilled in the martial art of kalaripayattu. He is devoted to Krishnamoorthy, a retired Supreme Court chief justice who lives in the same apartment complex.

Krishnamoorthy reveals to Jayaraman that years earlier he had sentenced a man named Vasudevan for a crime he knew the man had not committed. Following his release from prison, Vasudevan becomes determined to take revenge on the judge and his family. Fearing the consequences of his past actions, Krishnamoorthy lives in constant anxiety and relies on Jayaraman for assistance with personal matters.

Following an incident at the apartment complex, Krishnamoorthy is found dead and a large sum of money disappears. Jayaraman becomes the prime suspect in both the theft and the murder. While attempting to clear his name, he uncovers connections between Krishnamoorthy's past decisions, Vasudevan's quest for revenge, and a young girl named Nandini, whose safety becomes increasingly important.

As the investigation progresses, Jayaraman must evade the authorities, protect Nandini, and uncover the truth behind the crimes, leading to a final confrontation that resolves the long-running conflict.

== Cast ==
- Mohanlal as Jayaraman, blind caretaker and lift operator in an apartment building
- Samuthirakani as Vasudevan, the serial killer (voiceover by Vijay Menon)
- Nedumudi Venu as Krishnamoorthy, former Supreme Court Justice
- Meenakshi as Nandini, Vasudevan's daughter and Jayaraman's adopted daughter
- Anusree as ACP Ganga IPS
- Vimala Raman as Devayani, apartment maid
- Mamukkoya as Kunju "Kunjikka" Mohammad, security guard
- Renji Panicker as City Police Commissioner P. Padmakumar IPS
- Chemban Vinod Jose as CI Anayadi Anandan
- Innocent as Madhavan, Jayaraman's uncle
- Hareesh Kanaran as Veeran, security guard
- Kalabhavan Shajohn as Constable Madhu, Devayani's ex-husband
- Kaviyoor Ponnamma as Jayaraman's aunt
- Kunchan as Narendran, Ganga's grand father
- Idavela Babu as Swaminathan, apartment resident and Krishnamoorthy's nephew
- Aju Varghese as "Maala" Babu, auto-driver
- Krishna Prasad as Raghavan, apartment resident
- Manikuttan as Devayani's brother
- Arjun Nandhakumar as Ravi, apartment resident
- Kalasala Babu as R. K. Menon, apartment resident
- Devshi Khanduri as Sardarji's daughter and Ravi's Fiancée
- Sona Heiden as Sardarji's wife
- Kozhikode Narayanan Nair as Pillai, shopkeeper
- Sreelatha Namboothiri as Krishnamoorthy's sister
- Balaji Sarma as SI Bhadran
- Chethan Jayalal as the janitor boy
- Anjali Nair as Lakshmi, Jayaraman's sister
- Bineesh Kodiyeri as Kannan, Jayaraman's brother
- Pradeep Chandran as ACP George IPS
- Sasi Kalinga as Varghese Mappila, money loaner
- Suchitra Pillai as Alphonsa, school principal
- Siddique as Bappootty, Jayaraman's friend (cameo appearance)
- Antony Perumbavoor as Boat passenger (cameo appearance)

== Production ==
=== Development ===
According to Priyadarshan, he was in a traumatic state after separating from his wife Lissy; he "couldn't think straight" and felt he had lost his "ability to make films". Mohanlal encouraged him to return to work, but "not with another comedy" (on which they had frequently collaborated). They were scheduled to work on an untitled, multilingual film in late 2015. The principal photography, expected to begin in September, was first postponed until March 2016 and never begun due to unfavourable weather in Russia (where the film was set). Priyadarshan decided to go ahead with a new project, and began reading screenplays; the director also had a two-month commitment from Mohanlal because of the other film.

He chose a script by November, and it was reported that filming would begin in January 2016; Mohanlal would join the set after finishing his commitment to Janatha Garage. In December, it was reported that filming would tentatively begin in February. In the same month, the film's title was announced; Priyadarshan would take over the screenplay, based on a story by Govind Vijayan. The film was reported to be a thriller, with Mohanlal playing a blind man falsely accused of murder. Priyadarshan described it as a "cat-and-mouse game" with a "little bit of humour too". Ooty and Kochi were scheduled as the primary filming locations.

Oppam was conceived as a crime thriller and developed from the gist of a short story by Vijayan. Mohanlal discovered the story and sent it to Priyadarshan. When the director pointed out several logical errors in the story, Mohanlal asked if he could rework it into a screenplay. Priyadarshan was intrigued by its premise of a blind man witnessing a murder. After spending a month working on it, Priyadarshan told Mohanlal that it can be made into a film and took two more months to draft a screenplay. According to the director, Oppam was the most challenging screenplay he had written to date. Priyadarshan said in January that filming would begin on 20 February, but in February he was still working on the screenplay's final draft and casting.

Although it was reported in December 2015 that G. P. Vijayakumar would produce Oppam for Seven Arts International, the film was produced by Antony Perumbavoor through his company, Aashirvad Cinemas. Director I. V. Sasi's son, Ani, was an associate director, and Priyadarshan's son Sidharth was an unofficial assistant director. In a later interview, in 2019, Priyadarshan said that Mohanlal had contemplated on directing Oppam (which would have been his directorial debut) but later he decided against it.

=== Casting ===
Priyadarshan tailored the lead character, Jayaraman, for Mohanlal (his regular collaborator) when he wrote the screenplay. Tamil actor Samuthirakani was cast after Mohanlal in December 2015, with the rest of the cast and crew yet to be finalised. Vijay Menon dubbed for Samuthirakani's character. Even though Mohanlal has acted temporarily blinded characters, Oppam was the first film in which he played a blind character throughout the film. Mohanlal told Priyadarshan that he would not act like a stereotypical blind man (blinking and look up), but like a sighted person. They had visited a school for the blind in Chennai for pre-production research, and saw children playing and running between obstacles as if they could see. Priyadarshan had also known blind men whose other senses were keen. The character of Jayaraman has exceptionally sharp senses, and an expert in martial art of kalaripayattu.

In a January Deccan Chronicle article, Sanchita Shetty said that she liked the screenplay and would play a substantial role in her Malayalam film debut. The following month, Priyadarshan confirmed that Vimala Raman would play one of the film's two lead female roles; Shetty was on the shortlist for the other role. Vimala said that her role was Jayaraman's love interest, and the role is different from what she has done to date. Anusree was later cast in the other role, since Priyadarshan wanted an actress who "look[ed] very much a Malayali". She played Ganga, a newly appointed DSP whose grandfather is visually impaired; she trusts Jayaraman, and helps him uncover the truth. Anusree was so looking forward to act in a Priyadarshan directorial that she did not ask about her role when he called.

In February, Baby Meenakshi was confirmed in a significant role with Mohanlal. Kalabhavan Shajohn confirmed his role that month as a villainous character. Sreeya Ramesh was confirmed in an unidentified role in April, and Sasi Kalinga in June. Mamukkoya played comic security guard Kunjikka, who was unable to get names right, mistakenly substituting them with Islamic names. Aju Varghese had a brief role as an auto rickshaw driver in scenes with Mohanlal and Samuthirakani. Varghese, a fan of Priyadarshan's films, requested a role in Oppam. Devshi Khanduri made her Malayalam debut as a Punjabi girl in love with a Malayali boy (Arjun Nandhakumar). Priyadarshan described the film to Nandhakumar during preparations for the 2016 Celebrity Cricket League.

Innocent played Jayaraman's uncle, and Anjali Nair his sister. Producer Antony Perumbavoor made a cameo appearance. Chemban Vinod Jose, Hareesh Kanaran, Renji Panicker, Kunchan, Kalasala Babu, Idavela Babu, Sona Heiden, Kaviyoor Ponnamma, and Siddique also had supporting roles. In a December 2016 interview, Dharmajan Bolgatty said that he was offered a role in the film but could not commit due to scheduling conflicts.

=== Filming ===
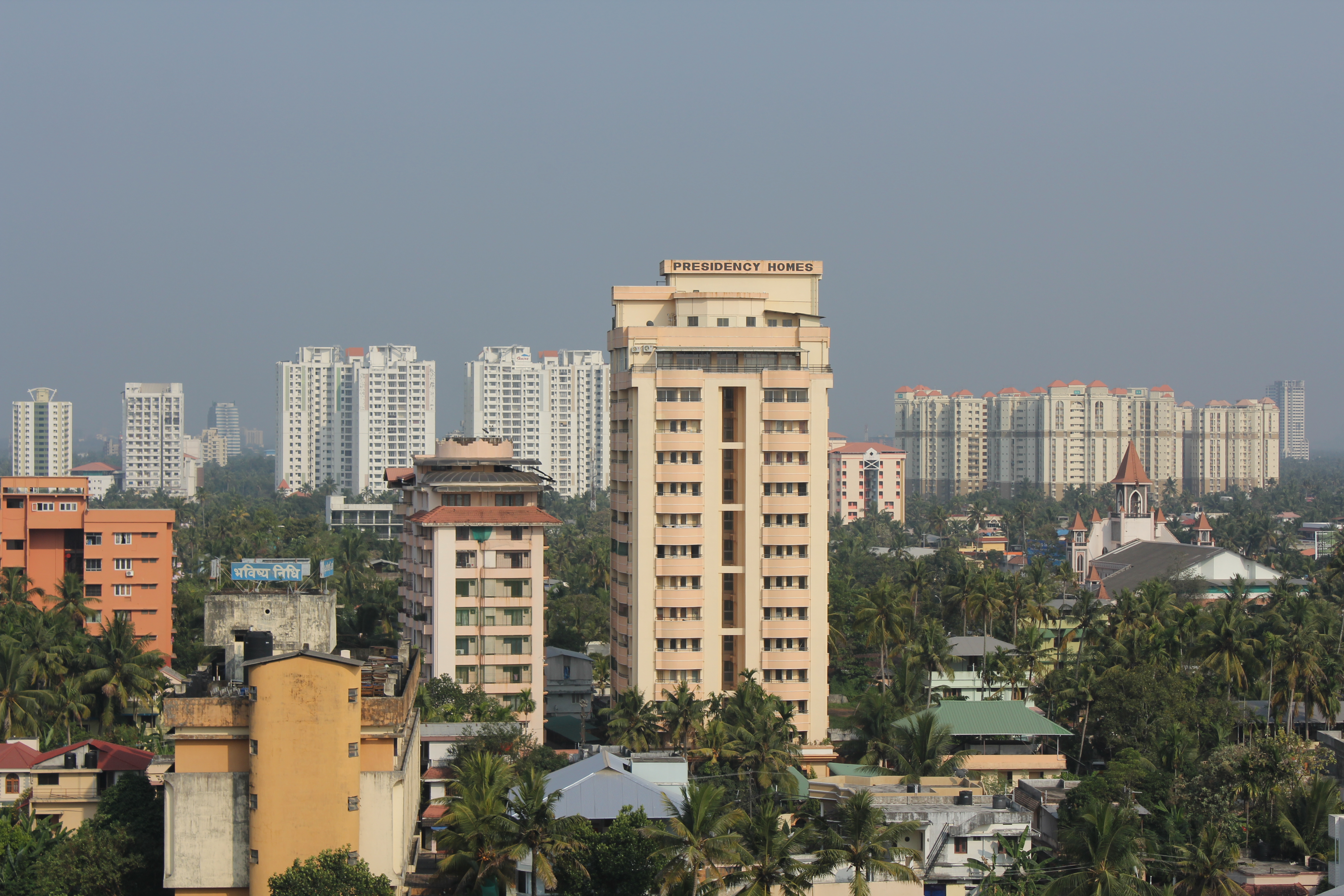
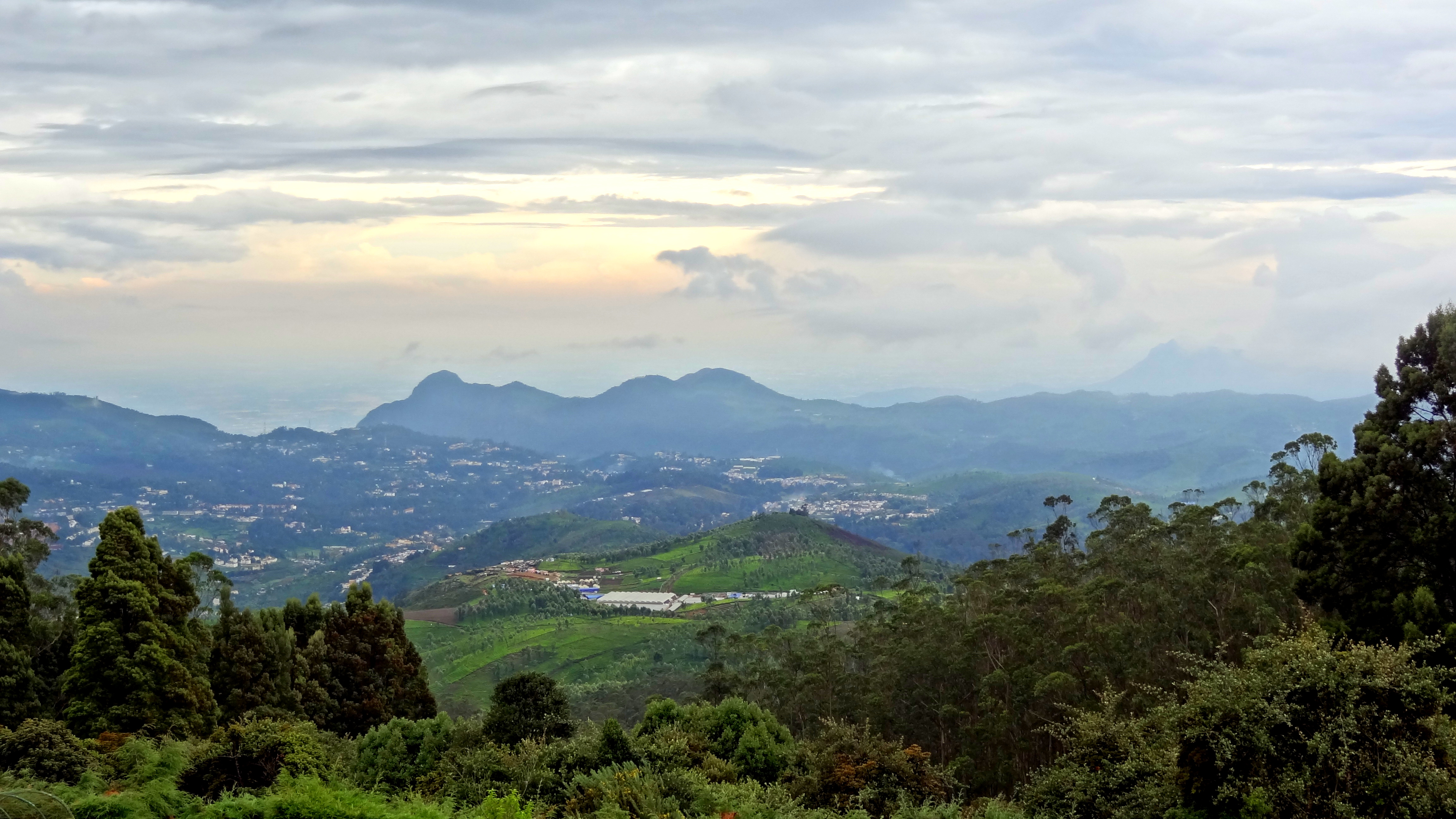
Much of Oppam was filmed in Kochi (top) and Ooty.

Oppam began principal photography on 5 March 2016 in Kochi, Kerala. Mohanlal joined the set that day, and Vimala a week later. A large set was constructed for a North Indian wedding with a song sequence with Mohanlal and Vimala and dancers in Punjabi dress. The elaborately produced song was completed in five days, and the dance was choreographed by Kala. Filming took place for three weeks at locations in Thammanam, Thrippunithura, and on Marine Drive in Kochi. The first shooting schedule was finished by the end of March. The film's cinematographer was N. K. Ekambaram.

The crew resumed filming in Kochi and in and around Ernakulam district in May 2016. Some scenes were shot at Fort Kochi, and tharavad scenes were filmed in Chottanikkara. Additional filming was done in Pullikkanam and Kanjar in Idukki district, where Mohanlal joined the set for a 10-day shooting schedule. Filming was done at Vagamon during the second week of May. Oppam's fight scenes were coordinated by Stunt Silva.

Filming moved to Ooty in Tamil Nadu in the first week of June. Priyadarshan considers Ooty a lucky charm, since it was a location for some of his successful films. He recreated a frame from the 1986 film, Thalavattam, (his first film in Ooty) in the song "Minungum Minnaminuge". Using the same camera lens used in Thalavattam, it was filmed in School Manth (where the song "Ponveene", from Thalavattam, was shot). Mohanlal and Meenakshi appeared in the frame which featured Mohanlal and Lissy in the original.

After Ooty, there was a two-day schedule at Chitranjali Studio in Thiruvananthapuram on 13 and 14 June for scenes with Mohanlal and Samuthirakani which were reportedly the film's climax. After the Thiruvananthapuram schedule, filming wrapped at the studio on the evening of 14 June 2016. Vimala said in an interview that directors usually take extra master shots, suggestion shots and counter shots while filming, but Priyadarshan had edited scenes in mind and did not make extra shots of any scenes. Oppam reportedly cost ₹7 crore.

=== Post-production ===
Post-production began as soon as the filming ended, and progressed in June and July 2016 at Priyadarshan's Four Frames studio in Chennai. Oppam was edited by M. S. Ayyappan Nair, and the crew returned to Chithranjali Studio in early July for dubbing. Composer Ron Ethan Yohann began working on the score after editing was completed by the end of July, first spotting the film. The post-production progressed through August 2016. Priyadarshan said that he reluctantly cut some of Mamukkoya's comedy scenes to reduce Oppam's length. Its final cut censored by the Central Board of Film Certification was 157 minutes long.

== Music ==
The film's six-song soundtrack was composed by 4 Musics (a group consisting of Jim Jacob, Biby Matthew, Eldhose Alias, and Justin James) in their second composition after Just Married (2015), whereas the background score was contributed by Ron Ethan Yohann in his Malayalam-film debut. The soundtrack was recorded, mixed and mastered at Jacob's Noise Headquarters in Kochi during December 2015, and completed within late-July 2016. The soundtrack album was released on the Satyam Audios label on 17 August 2016, and was positively received by critics with the songs: "Chinnamma Adi" and "Minungum Minnaminuge" being successful and among the most-viewed Malayalam video songs in YouTube.

== Release ==
Oppam's theatrical release was announced along with its first poster in March 2016, scheduled for the festival of Onam in September. At his request, a special showing was arranged for the actor Rajinikanth at his Chennai home a day before the film's general release. Oppam was released in India on 8 September 2016 by Maxlab Cinemas and Entertainments on 104 screens across Kerala, and the film opened internationally on 21 September. In Europe, it was scheduled for a limited release on 14 September by PJ Entertainments and a general release on 23 September. The release was postponed until 21 September due to a censorship issue, and advance booking began on 19 September. The film was released on 119 screens in the United Kingdom and Ireland on 23 September, the widest release there for a Malayalam film.

In November 2016, Priyadarshan said that the film would be dubbed and released in Telugu and Tamil and Mohanlal would dub his voice in both. Its Telugu dubbing rights were purchased by Overseas Network Entertainment. Entitled Kanupapa, the Telugu version was released worldwide on 3 February 2017. Oppam was released for home video on 22 December 2016 by Satyam Audios. The film premiered on 9 April 2017 on the Asianet television channel. According to Broadcast Audience Research Council data, it was in fourth place among premiere films of all time with the most target rating points on Malayalam channels (3,949,000 impressions) as of September 2017.

=== Marketing ===
In May 2016, Mohanlal and Priyadarshan produced and released a Dubsmash video to encourage entries in its video contest. Priyadarshan asked director Alphonse Puthren to edit the film's trailer. The trailer debuted in Kerala theatres on 22 July with the Tamil film, Kabali, which was distributed by Maxlab Cinemas and Entertainments in the state. "Minungum Minnaminunge"'s music video, with Mohanlal and Meenakshi, was released on 24 August on YouTube. Oppam was promoted on "Thiruvonam Lalettanodu Oppam", a September program which was part of a photography contest organised by Mathrubhumi, 94.3 Club FM and the electronic retailer Bismi, and Mohanlal met with the winners.

== Reception ==
=== Box office ===
The film grossed ₹1.56 crore on its opening day at the Kerala box office, topping parallel releases Oozham and Iru Mugan. The film received positive word of mouth, which boosted ticket sales. Box-office earnings increased exponentially over the next few days; the film grossed ₹7.25 crore through its four-day opening weekend (₹2.03 crore that Sunday), with a distributor's share of ₹3.45 crore. It exceeded the first-week earnings of Premam by grossing ₹12.6 crore with a share of ₹6 crore, setting an opening-week record in the Kerala state.

Oppam was the fastest film to earn ₹20 crore in Kerala (11 days). By grossing over ₹25 crore on day 17 it became the highest-grossing film of the year at the Kerala box office, passing Jacobinte Swargarajyam. Within 22 days it crossed the ₹30 crore mark, the fastest film to do so in Kerala. The film's worldwide total was ₹35 crore at 31 days, with ₹22.75 crore from Kerala. The film grossed ₹42 crore worldwide, Oppam was the second-highest-grossing Malayalam film of the year (behind Pulimurugan), with box-office earnings of over ₹30 crore in Kerala box office. The film ran for over 125 days in Kerala theatres.

Oppam grossed ₹8.31 crore overseas in Gulf Cooperation Council territories in 10 days. The film grossed £45,371 in its opening weekend (23 – 25 September) from 74 British theatres, the fourth-best foreign opener that weekend. It grossed £84,185 in four weekends from the United Kingdom and Ireland regions. In the United States, it earned US$44,790 in the opening weekend (30 September – 2 October) from 16 screens, and US$94,466 in four weekends.

=== Critical reception ===
Oppam received generally positive responses from critics. G. Ragesh of Malayala Manorama gave Oppam three-and-a-half out of five stars, he said it is a carefully crafted and well-made thriller with some "edge-of-the-seat moments". Ragesh found Mohanlal's portrayal of Jayaraman the best part of the film (which "celebrates the natural actor that Mohanlal is"), and praised the "perfectly choreographed" action scenes. A Sify critic called it an engaging film and wrote: "Oppam is based on a script which is fine at best. But it is the slick presentation and of course, a brilliant performance from Mohanlal that overcomes its minor weaknesses" and adding, "It is the stellar performance from Mohanlal that adds to the merits of this thriller in a crucial way". The critic gave Samuthirakani a special mention.

The Indian Express's Goutham V. S. gave Oppam three out of five stars, and opined that the film is engaging and have an interesting plot that brings back the vintage Mohanlal-Priyadarshan combo. "Watching Mohanlal as Jayaraman, one is reminded of the skill set this actor possesses. He seamlessly becomes his character and so smooth is the transition that you forget the effort that must have gone into it". He praised the cinematography and score that "maintain a tensed mood as the intriguing hide-and-seek between the protagonist and antagonist plays out". Also giving the film three out of five stars, Deepa Soman of The Times of India wrote: "Oppam has a few elements to create some entertainingly 'tensed' moments through its length, but it's not one of those gripping thrillers that leave you content when you leave the hall". Soman enjoyed the songs that she felt suit the situations well, and are engaging.

For Rediff.com, Paresh C. Palicha wrote: "It's an interesting film with the basics of the typical Priyadarshan films remaining in place ... the biggest positive about Oppam is that Mohanlal gives more sharpness and detailing to the writing and direction with his extraordinary performance and that makes the film a must watch". He gave it 2.5 out of five stars. Srivatsan of India Today wrote, "Oppam, on many levels, is solid at its core. Unlike many commercial entertainers, the film is formulaic ... what's intriguing is the director's treatment of the subject". He praised Mohanlal's performance and the film's score and songs, giving it two-and-a-half out of five stars.

Anu James of the International Business Times called Oppam "a winner all the way": "The movie offers some edge-of-the-seat moments with an engaging narrative. Even though the culprit is revealed in the first half of the thriller, the movie doesn't let you get bored" and said the direction and screenplay are impressive. She praised Mohanlal's performance and the songs, cinematography, and editing and added that even with a predictable plot and few questions that might leave the audience confused, "the many positive aspects of the movie make the negatives fade away". For The News Minute, Sowmya Rajendran wrote: "Mohanlal nails the role of a blind man in this well-executed thriller" and also noted the performances of the rest of the cast. Although the film "keeps you interested till the end, the plot somewhat loses steam in the second half".

=== Awards ===
Oppam received six nominations at the 64th Filmfare Awards South and won two awards for the song "Chinnamma Adi"—Sreekumar won the award for playback singing, and Vasudhevan for lyrics. The film received six nominations at the 6th South Indian International Movie Awards, but did not win in any category. Menon who dubbed for Samuthirakani's voice won an award for dubbing at the 47th Kerala State Film Awards. Oppam was not eligible for the 64th National Film Awards, since Priyadarshan chaired the year's award jury.

Award	Date of ceremony	Category	Nominee(s)	Result	Ref.
Asianet Film Awards	20 January 2017	Best Film	Antony Perumbavoor, Priyadarshan	Won	
Asianet Film Awards	20 January 2017	Best Actor	Mohanlal	Won	
Asianet Film Awards	20 January 2017	Best Music Director	4 Musics	Won	
Asianet Film Awards	20 January 2017	Best Lyricist	B. K. Harinarayanan	Won	
Asiavision Awards	18 November 2016	Best Director	Priyadarshan	Won	
Asiavision Awards	18 November 2016	Outstanding Movie of the Year	Priyadarshan	Won	
Asiavision Awards	18 November 2016	Popular Actor of the Year	Mohanlal	Won	
Asiavision Awards	18 November 2016	Best Singer – Male	M. G. Sreekumar (for "Chinnamma Adi")	Won	
Asiavision Awards	18 November 2016	Best Lyricist	B. K. Harinarayanan	Won	
Asiavision Awards	18 November 2016	New Sensation in Singing	Sreya Jayadeep	Won	
Filmfare Awards South	17 June 2017	Best Film – Malayalam	Oppam	Nominated	
Filmfare Awards South	17 June 2017	Best Director – Malayalam	Priyadarshan	Nominated	
Filmfare Awards South	17 June 2017	Best Actor – Malayalam	Mohanlal	Nominated	
Filmfare Awards South	17 June 2017	Best Lyricist – Malayalam	Madhu Vasudevan (for "Chinnamma Adi")	Won	
Filmfare Awards South	17 June 2017	Best Lyricist – Malayalam	B. K. Harinarayanan (for "Minungum Minnaminuge")	Nominated	
Filmfare Awards South	17 June 2017	Best Male Playback Singer – Malayalam	M. G. Sreekumar (for "Chinnamma Adi")	Won	
IIFA Utsavam	28 – 29 March 2017	Performance in a Leading Role – Male	Mohanlal	Nominated	
IIFA Utsavam	28 – 29 March 2017	Performance in a Leading Role – Female	Anusree	Nominated	
IIFA Utsavam	28 – 29 March 2017	Direction	Priyadarshan	Nominated	
IIFA Utsavam	28 – 29 March 2017	Performance in a Negative Role	Samuthirakani	Nominated	
IIFA Utsavam	28 – 29 March 2017	Music Direction	4 Musics	Nominated	
IIFA Utsavam	28 – 29 March 2017	Playback Singer – Female	Sreya Jayadeep	Won	
Kerala Film Critics Association Awards	2 March 2018	Best Film	Oppam	Won	
Kerala Film Critics Association Awards	2 March 2018	Best Director	Priyadarshan	Won	
Kerala Film Critics Association Awards	2 March 2018	Best Actor	Mohanlal	Won	
Kerala Film Critics Association Awards	2 March 2018	Special Jury Award	Samuthirakani	Won	
Kerala State Film Awards	10 September 2017	Best Dubbing Artist	Vijay Menon (dubbed for Samuthirakani)	Won	
South Indian International Movie Awards	30 June 2017	Best Film	Aashirvad Cinemas	Nominated	
South Indian International Movie Awards	30 June 2017	Best Director	Priyadarshan	Nominated	
South Indian International Movie Awards	30 June 2017	Best Actor in a Negative Role	Samuthirakani	Nominated	
South Indian International Movie Awards	30 June 2017	Best Lyricist	B. K. Harinarayanan (for "Minungum Minnaminuge")	Nominated	
South Indian International Movie Awards	30 June 2017	Best Playback Singer (Male)	M. G. Sreekumar (for "Chinnamma Adi")	Nominated	
South Indian International Movie Awards	30 June 2017	Best Playback Singer (Female)	Sreya Jayadeep (for "Minungum Minnaminuge")	Nominated	
Vanitha Film Awards	12 February 2017	Best Actor	Mohanlal	Won	
Vanitha Film Awards	12 February 2017	Popular Actress	Anusree	Won	
Vanitha Film Awards	12 February 2017	Best Male Singer	M. G. Sreekumar (for "Chinnamma Adi")	Won	
Vanitha Film Awards	12 February 2017	Best Choreographer	Kala	Won	

== Remakes ==
In June 2016, two months before Oppam's release, Priyadarshan told Press Trust of India that he was interested in making a Bollywood version, saying "there are already inquiries for Tamil and Telugu remakes. I am just waiting for it to release and see how it is received by the audience". After the film's release, he said that he planned to show it to Shah Rukh Khan and Aamir Khan; he would not direct any South Indian-languages versions, but "a lot of offers have come for remake rights and negotiations are still going on". Overseas Network Entertainment bought the remake and dubbing rights for Telugu, with Nagarjuna approached to play the lead. In November, Priyadarshan confirmed that the Kannada remake rights were sold and it would star Shiva Rajkumar, though he would not direct. The following month, he said that Ajay Devgn, Saif Ali Khan, and John Abraham had seen the film but the cast for the Hindi remake was not finalised. The director said that he made cultural changes in the story to appeal to Bollywood audiences, primarily in the film's first half. Devgn was virtually confirmed in February 2017, and the film would be produced by Viacom 18 Motion Pictures. The Kannada remake, Kavacha, began filming in November 2017 with Meenakshi reprising her role, and was released on 5 April 2019.

On 4 July 2025, Priyadarshan confirmed that he will be directing Oppam's Hindi remake starring Saif Ali Khan and Akshay Kumar in lead roles, whose shooting began by August 2025 and supposed to release on 11 September 2026, under the title Haiwaan. This will also mark the final film appearance of Asrani who died in October 2025.
