= Aashirvad Cinemas =

Indian film studio

- Type: Privately held company
- Industry: Motion picture
- Founded: 1999
- Headquarters: Kochi, India
- Area served: Worldwide
- Products: Films
- Owner: Antony Perumbavoor
- Subsidiaries: Maxlab Cinemas and Entertainments
- Website: aashirvadcinemas.com

Aashirvad Cinemas is an Indian film production and distribution company based in Kochi, Kerala. It was established in 1999 by Antony Perumbavoor since then, it has produced over 30 Malayalam films, starring Mohanlal. Since 2009, the company co-operates with the distribution company Maxlab Cinemas and Entertainments co-founded by Mohanlal and Antony Perumbavoor for distributing films. It is one among the most active and leading production houses in the Malayalam film industry.

Aashirvad Cinemas has established itself by producing several hits such as Narasimham (2000), Ravanaprabhu (2001), Naran (2005),Rasathanthram (2006), Drishyam (2013), Oppam (2016), Lucifer(2019) and Neru (2023). It has also produced three of the most expensive Malayalam films — Odiyan (2018), Lucifer (2019), and Marakkar: Arabikadalinte Simham (2020) with Marakkar not being profitable ventures for the production house.

Aashirvad Cinemas has won several awards, including two National Film Awards, four Kerala State Film Awards and a Filmfare Awards South. In 2019, Aashirvad Cinemas opened office in Hong Kong with the name Feitian Aashirvad Cinemas and signed an agreement with a Chinese film production company to co-produce and distribute films in China. Aashirvad Cinemas is the currently the biggest production company in Mollywood. It has made big budget films like Odiyan (₹30 crore), Lucifer (₹35 crore), Marakkar: Arabikadalinte Simham (₹100 crore), and Barroz (₹150 crore). It also made the 2025 film L2: Empuraan, co-producing with Lyca Productions and Sree Gokulam Movies, which became the second highest-grossing Malayalam film of all time.

== History ==
=== 2000-2010 ===
Aashirvad Cinemas was founded by Mohanlal's former chauffeur Antony Perumbavoor in 1999. Its first production was the 2000 film, Narasimham. The company's next was the 2001 action drama film, Raavanaprabhu, which was a sequel to the 1993 film, Devasuram. The film won the Kerala State Film Award for Best Film with Popular Appeal and Aesthetic Value. Over the years, Aashrivad Cinemas have continued to receive great reception and success for their films and continue making new records. The action drama Natturajavu was the only release in 2004. It released coinciding with the festival of Onam and was the winner among the Onam releases. Joshiy-directed action drama Naran was the only release in 2005, which was the winner among the Onam releases of the year. In the following year, Sathyan Anthikkad-directed family drama Rasathanthram became a commercial success. Two films released in 2009, action film Sagar Alias Jackie Reloaded directed by Amal Neerad, a spiritual successor to Mohanlal's 1987 film Irupatham Noottandu. It had a good opening which did not sustain in the following weeks.

=== 2010-2020 ===
The 2011 comedy film China Town made ₹15.2 crore at the box office and was a major commercial success. The 2012 drama Spirit won the National Film Award for Best Film on Other Social Issues. In 2013, family-thriller Drishyam received widespread critical acclaim and became the highest-grossing Malayalam and industry hit film and the first to gross over ₹50 crore mark at the box office. The 2016 crime thriller Oppam also became one of the highest-grossing Malayalam films of all time by grossing ₹65 crore worldwide. Mohanlal and Lal Jose collaborated for the first time in Velipadinte Pusthakam in 2017, which was a moderate success. In 2019, Prithviraj Sukumaran-directed action drama Lucifer grossed ₹128 crore worldwide, becoming the highest-grossing Malayalam film till date, beating Mohanlal's Pulimurugan. It was also the first Malayalam film to gross over ₹50 crores in overseas markets. It was followed by the comedy-drama Ittymaani: Made in China directed by debutant duo Jibi-Joju.

=== 2021-present ===
During the COVID-19 pandemic, Aashirvad Cinemas produced the sequel to Drishyam, Drishyam 2, which was the first film in Mohanlal's career to premiere on an OTT platform Amazon Prime Video instead of the normal theatrical release. The film received widespread positive reviews. Then the company produced Telugu film titled Drushyam 2 (co-produced by Suresh Productions and RajKumar Theatres), which was a remake of Drishyam 2 also premiered on OTT platform Amazon Prime Video instead of the theatrical release. Then the company produced Marakkar: Arabikadalinte Simham (co-produced by Moonshot Entertainments and Confident Group), an action period film directed by Priyadarshan based on the life of Kunjali Marakkar. It is the most expensive Malayalam film ever, with a budget of ₹100 crores. The film released on 2 December 2021 and met with negative reviews and became a Box-office failure. In 2022, the company produced three films, out of which two films, Bro Daddy directed by Prithviraj Sukumaran and 12th Man directed by Jeethu Joseph had Direct OTT release on Disney+ Hotstar. Both films received generally positive reviews. Then they produced Monster directed by Vysakh and the film was Mohanlal's second collaboration with Vysakh (as director) after Pulimurugan which received negative reviews and was a Box-office failure. In 2023, the company produced Alone directed by Shaji Kailas. The film received mixed to positive reviews but was a Box-office failure mainly because the film was originally filmed for OTT. In the same year, the company produced the court room drama film Neru directed by Jeethu Joseph and received highly positive response and became one of the highest-grossing Malayalam films of all time by grossing ₹100 crore worldwide. In 2024, Mohanlal's debut directorial Barroz received mostly mixed-to-negative reviews, and emerged as a box-office bomb. In 2025, the sequel to Lucifer, titled L2: Empuraan, which has also been co-produced by Lyca Productions and Sree Gokulam Movies was released and it grossed over ₹265 crores and emerged as the highest grossing Malayalam film ever .

== Filmography ==
Key
†	Denotes films that have not yet been released

Title	Year	Director	Budget	Worldwide gross	Notes
Narasimham	2000	Shaji Kailas	₹1.1 crore (US$110,000)	est.₹22 crore (US$2.3 million)	The film was a commercial success, and became the first Malayalam film to cross ₹20 crore and second highest-grossing South Indian film of the year. The film also marked the 1000th film of Jagathy Sreekumar.
Ravanaprabhu	2001	Ranjith		₹20 crore (US$2.1 million)	The film marked the directorial debut of screenwriter Ranjith. It is a sequel to the 1993 film Devaasuram. The film emerged as a commercial success and emerged as the highest-grossing South Indian film of the year.
Kilichundan Mampazham	2003	Priyadarshan			
Natturajavu	2004	Shaji Kailas	₹1.75 crore (US$180,000)	₹2.87 crore (US$300,000)	
Naran	2005	Joshiy	₹2.55 crore (US$260,000)	₹3.70 crore (US$380,000)	
Rasathanthram	2006	Sathyan Anthikkad	₹2.88 crore (US$300,000)	₹16 crore (US$1.7 million)	The film marked the first collaboration between Mohanlal and Sathyan Anthikad since Pingami. It was a commercial success at the box office.
Baba Kalyani	2006	Shaji Kailas			
Ali Bhai	2007	Shaji Kailas			
Paradeshi	2007	P. T. Kunju Muhammed			Mohanlal won the Kerala State Film Awards For Best Actor for his performance in the film.
Innathe Chintha Vishayam	2008	Sathyan Anthikkad			
Sagar Alias Jacky Reloaded	2009	Amal Neerad			Sequel to Irupatham Noottandu
Evidam Swargamanu	2009	Rosshan Andrrews			Won the Kerala State Film Award for Best Film with Popular Appeal and Aesthetic Value.
China Town	2011	Rafi Mecartin			Multistarrer with Mohanlal, Jayaram, and Dileep. The film was declared a blockbuster at the box office and was one of the highest-grossing films of the year. Also the last collaboration of Rafi Mecartin duo in direction.
Snehaveedu	2011	Sathyan Anthikkad			The film marked the 300th film of Mohanlal.
Casanovva	2012	Roshan Andrews			The film was co-produced with Confident Group.
Spirit	2012	Ranjith			
Ladies and Gentleman	2013	Siddique	₹8 crore (US$830,000)	₹12 crore (US$1.2 million)	The film was co-produced with Confident Group.
Drishyam	2013	Jeethu Joseph	₹3.5 crore (US$360,000) - ₹5 crore (US$520,000) (Note: Gautaman Bhaskaran of Hindustan Times claims the film's budget as ₹35 million, while IANS claims it to be ₹50 million. Sify claims the budget of the film to be ₹45 million.)	₹75 crore (US$7.8 million)	The film became the highest-grossing Malayalam film at the time of its release. It was also the highest-grossing Malayalam film of the year. It has been remade into 7 Languages: Tamil, Telugu, Kannada, Hindi, Sinhalese, Chinese and Indonesian becoming the fourth Malayalam film to be remade into 6 languages after Poovinu Puthiya Poonthennal, Kireedam and Shutter. It is also the first Indian film to be remade in Chinese and Indonesian.
Ennum Eppozhum	2015	Sathyan Anthikad			
Loham	2015	Ranjith			
Oppam	2016	Priyadarshan	₹7 crore (US$730,000)	₹65 crore (US$6.7 million)	The film was the second highest-grossing Malayalam film of the year after Pulimurugan.
Velipadinte Pusthakam	2017	Lal Jose		₹15 crore (US$1.6 million) - ₹20 crore (US$2.1 million)	The film marked Mohanlal's first collaboration with Lal Jose.
Aadhi	2018	Jeethu Joseph		₹50 crore (US$5.2 million)	The film was one of the highest-grossing Malayalam films of the year. It marked Pranav Mohanlal's debut as an adult lead actor. It is the first and only production that does not feature Mohanlal in the lead role.
Odiyan	2018	V. A. Shrikumar Menon	₹25 crore (US$2.6 million)	₹55 crore (US$5.7 million)	The film marked V. A. Shrikumar Menon's directorial debut. It is the first to feature Mohanlal and Prakash Raj together since the 1997 Tamil film Iruvar.
Lucifer	2019	Prithviraj Sukumaran	₹30 crore (US$3.1 million)	₹135 crore (US$14 million)	It was the second Malayalam film after Pulimurugan to collect more than ₹100 crores. It also collected ₹50 crore from overseas. The film marked the directorial debut of actor Prithviraj Sukumaran.
Ittymaani: Made in China	2019	Jibi–Joju	₹12 crore (US$1.2 million)	₹35.4 crore (US$3.7 million)	The film marked the directorial debut of Jibi-Joju.
Drishyam 2	2021	Jeethu Joseph			A sequel to Drishyam. The film was directly released on Amazon Prime Video.
Drushyam 2	2021	Jeethu Joseph			The first Telugu film produced by the company and a remake of Drishyam 2. It was co-produced with Suresh Productions and Rajkumar Theatres Pvt. Ltd.
Marakkar: Arabikadalinte Simham	2021	Priyadarshan	₹65 crore (US$6.7 million)	₹50 crore (US$5.2 million)	The film was then the most expensive Malayalam film made on a budget of ₹ 65 crore. It was co-produced with Moonshot Entertainments and Confident Group.
Bro Daddy	2022	Prithviraj Sukumaran			The film was directly released on Disney+ Hotstar.
12th Man	2022	Jeethu Joseph			The film was directly released on Disney+ Hotstar.
Monster	2022	Vysakh			The film marked Mohanlal's second collaboration with Vysakhas a director after Pulimurugan.
Drishyam 2	2022	Abhishek Pathak			As co-producer. First Hindi film production venture.
Alone	2023	Shaji Kailas		₹1.75 crore (US$180,000)	The film featured Mohanlal only in an on-screen role.
Neru	2023	Jeethu Joseph	₹10 crore (US$1.0 million)	₹90 crore (US$9.3 million)	
Barroz 3D	2024	Mohanlal			The film marked the directorial debut of Mohanlal.
L2: Empuraan	2025	Prithviraj Sukumaran	₹175 crore (US$18 million)	₹268 crore (US$28 million)	The film is a sequel to Lucifer. It is co-produced with Lyca Productions and Sree Gokulam Movies. It is currently the second highest-grossing Malayalam film of all time, and also the first Malayalam film to collect more than ₹250 crores. It also collected more than ₹140 crores from overseas.
Hridayapoorvam	2025	Sathyan Anthikad			The film marked Mohanlal's 20th collaboration with Sathyan Anthikad after Ennum Eppozhum.
Drishyam 3	2026	Jeethu Joseph			Also co-distributor
Thudakkam	2026	Jude Anthany Joseph			

== Accolades ==
Following are the accolades won by Aashirvad Cinemas. The awards received by the producer alone is included in this list.

Award	Year	Category	Film	Result
National Film Awards	2012	Best Film on Other Social Issues	Spirit	Won
National Film Awards	2019	Best Feature Film	Marakkar	Won
Kerala State Film Awards	2001	Best Film with Popular Appeal and Aesthetic Value	Raavanaprabhu	Won
Kerala State Film Awards	2008	Best Film with Popular Appeal and Aesthetic Value	Innathe Chintha Vishayam	Won
Kerala State Film Awards	2009	Best Film with Popular Appeal and Aesthetic Value	Evidam Swargamanu	Won
Kerala State Film Awards	2013	Best Film with Popular Appeal and Aesthetic Value	Drishyam	Won
Kerala Film Critics Association Awards	2000	Best Popular Film	Narasimham	Won
Kerala Film Critics Association Awards	2006	Best Popular Film	Rasathanthram	Won
Kerala Film Critics Association Awards	2009	Best Film	Evidam Swargamanu	Won
Kerala Film Critics Association Awards	2013	Best Film	Drishyam	Won
Kerala Film Critics Association Awards	2016	Best Film	Oppam	Won
Filmfare Awards South	2008	Best Film – Malayalam	Innathe Chintha Vishayam	Nominated
Filmfare Awards South	2009	Best Film – Malayalam	Evidam Swargamanu	Nominated
Filmfare Awards South	2013	Best Film – Malayalam	Drishyam	Won
Filmfare Awards South	2016	Best Film – Malayalam	Oppam	Nominated
South Indian International Movie Awards	2012	Best Film – Malayalam	Spirit	Nominated
South Indian International Movie Awards	2013	Best Film – Malayalam	Drishyam	Won
South Indian International Movie Awards	2016	Best Film – Malayalam	Oppam	Nominated
South Indian International Movie Awards	2019	Best Film – Malayalam	Lucifer	Won
Asiavision Awards	2013	Best Popular Movie	Drishyam	Won
Asiavision Awards	2016	Outstanding Movie of the Year	Oppam	Won
Vanitha Film Awards	2013	Best Film	Drishyam	Won
Vanitha Film Awards	2019	Most Popular Film	Lucifer	Won
Asianet Film Awards	2000	Best Film	Narasimham	Won
Asianet Film Awards	2012	Most Popular Film	Spirit	Won
Asianet Film Awards	2013	Best Film	Drishyam	Won
Asianet Film Awards	2013	Most Popular Film	Drishyam	Won
Asianet Film Awards	2016	Best Film	Oppam	Won
Jaihind TV Awards	2007	Best Film	Paradeshi	Won
Jaihind TV Awards	2013	Best Film	Drishyam	Won
Kairali TV – World Malayali Council Film Award	2009	Best Film	Evidam Swargamanu	Won

== See also ==
- Pranavam Arts International
- Maxlab Cinemas and Entertainments
