= Film Exhibitors United Organisation of Kerala =

Film association in Kerala

- Nickname: FEUOK
- Formation: January 24, 2017; 9 years ago
- Founded at: Kochi, Kerala
- Headquarters: Kochi
- Location: India

The Film Exhibitors United Organisation of Kerala (FEUOK) is an association representing film theatre owners, producers and rdistributers in Kerala, India. The group was established to address issues in the state's film exhibition sector, including box-office practices, revenue-sharing terms, and the coordination of theatrical releases.

== Formation ==
FEUOK was established on 24 January 2017 and actor-producer Dileep was announced as the organisation's president, and a committee of theatre owners and distributors was appointed.

== Internal issues ==
In 2024, police registered a case against several office-bearers following an alleged altercation during an industry meeting.
