= Shiju Nambyath =

- Born: Shiju Nambiyath; 6 June 1973 (age 52); Palakulam, Alappuzha, Kerala
- Occupation: Screenwriter
- Spouse: Sandhya
- Children: Sarang, Saketh

Shiju Nambiyath, is a Script Writer and Dialogue writer in Malayalam cinema.

== Personal life ==
Shiju was born to Sri. K. C Thankappan and Smt. N.K Pankajakshi in Palakulam, Alappuzha district on 6 June 1973.

== Film career ==
He started his Script writing career with well known Script writer Cheriyan Kalpakavadi. Then he worked as assistant director and associate script writer with many versatile film Directors and writers like Venu Nagavally, Vipin Mohan, Madhupal and T. A. Shahid. In his early professional life, he was working with C-DIT as assistant director in Documentary wing and also wrote and Directed a documentary for PRD Kerala named "Alappuzha Vikasana Vismayam". He was also a member of Theater classification project for Kerala Chalachithra Academy.

His noted co-writing includes blockbusters like Ben Johnson, Rajamanikyam, Keerthi Chakra, Kurukshetra. His independent story, Screenplay and Dialogues were Housefull, Mission 90 Days (Dialogues) and Major Ravi - Mohanlal movie, 1971: Beyond Borders (Dialogues), Sadrishya Vakyam 24 : 29 (2017) (Screenplay and dialogues)

He achieved significant recognition at the Target Sky International Film Festival Season 1, held in Bangalore during the 2021–22 edition. He wrote and directed a Malayalam short film titled The Bet, based on the short story of the same name by Russian author Anton Chekhov. His film received critical acclaim and went on to win four prestigious awards at the festival — Best Malayalam Film, Best Thriller, Best Drama, and Best Short Film. He was praised for his unique storytelling and gripping direction, which brought a classic literary work to life in a contemporary cinematic format.

He wrote the screenplay and dialogues for Ebenezer, a horror thriller movie directed by Mithun Bose, which was released in 2025.
