= 1971: Beyond Borders =

2017 film

- Theatrical release poster
- Directed by: Major Ravi
- Written by: Major Ravi; Shiju Nambyath (Dialogues)
- Produced by: Andrew Johnson
- Starring: Mohanlal; Arunoday Singh; Allu Sirish
- Narrated by: Mammootty
- Cinematography: Sujith Vaassudev
- Edited by: Samjith Mohammed
- Music by: Gopi Sunder
- Production company: Red Rose Creations
- Distributed by: Red Rose Release; Singapore: Singapore Coliseum
- Release date: 7 April 2017 (India)
- Running time: 130 minutes
- Country: India
- Language: Malayalam
- Budget: ₹15 crore
- Box office: ₹10.24 crore

1971: Beyond Borders is a 2017 Indian Malayalam-language war film written and directed by Major Ravi. It is the fourth and final installment in the Major Mahadevan film series and circumquel to 2006 film Keerthi Chakra and 2010 film Kandahar, with Mohanlal in a double role as reprising his as Major / Colonel Mahadevan and a new character as Major / Brigadier Sahadevan. It also features Arunoday Singh and Allu Sirish. The film, set in two time periods, is based on the Indo-Pakistani War of 1971 and act as both prequel, in 1971 and follow-up to the series in the present year of 2017. Mohanlal's and Sirish's characters were modeled on Hoshiar Singh Dahiya and Arun Khetarpal, both of whom were awarded the Param Vir Chakra for their roles in the 1971 Indo-Pakistani War.

Dialogues were written by Shiju Nambyath from a script by Ravi. The film was shot by Sujith Vaassudev, while Gopi Sunder provided the score. Siddharth Vipin, Najim Arshad, and Rahul Subramanian composed the soundtrack. Principal photography commenced on 31 October 2016 in Suratgarh, Rajasthan and completed on 5 February 2017 in Georgia. 1971: Beyond Borders released on 7 April 2017 in India, and flopped at the box office.

== Plot ==
The film starts in Georgia where a Pakistani UN Peace Keeping Forces reaches a building where Gangsters are hiding. As the counter insurgency operation begins, the insurgents open fire. The team is stuck in cross firing and calls for reinforcements. At that time, an Indian UN Peace Keeping Forces reaches there and guns down all the militants rescues the contingent. The leader of the contingent is Colonel Mahadevan. He meets the leader of the Pakistani contingent, whose name is Col. Ajmal Raja Akram. He reveals that he is the son of Lt. Col Mohd.Akhram Raja. At a function to honour the UN Peace Keeping Forces, Ajmal reveals that his father was killed in the Indo-Pakistani War of 1971. On hearing about this, Col. Mahadevan reveals that his father, Major Sahadevan, killed Ajmal's father.

The story shifts to 1971 when Bangladesh was fighting for independence from Pakistan. On 3 December 1971, Indian airfields are attacked in retaliation to which the Prime Minister Indira Gandhi announces war. After the announcement, the entire army is rallied, and leaves are cancelled. The war starts when the Pakistan Army Armoured Corps attack Indian positions at the Basantar river. The Indians are not prepared and face a defeat. The Pakistani Army takes many POWs. The prisoners are tortured by the army men. At the same time, Raja notices this and reprimands his senior officer for violating the Geneva Convention which state that POWs should be treated like guests to which his senior officer is not happy.

Later, the Indians launch a full offensive against the Pakistanis in which one of their best tank commander Chinmay is martyred. On seeing Chinmay's face, Raja remarks that such a young boy had destroyed six tanks. He declares ceasefire to let the Indian Army collect the body. On seeing Chinmay's death, the Indian Army vows to take revenge. The Battle of Basantar begins with heavy casualties on both sides. In the end, Raja and Sahadevan face each other in a one on one battle, which is won by Sahadevan. At the same time, Pakistan surrenders unconditionally, and the official ceasefire to end the war is declared. Even though India had won the battle, Sahadevan is deeply disturbed by the deaths of the Indian soldiers and the Pakistani soldiers. He resolves that there should be no more wars as it leads to death and destruction.

In the final credits scene, we can see an aged retired Brigadier Sahadevan narrating this story to his little grandchildren. He tells them that nothing can be gained through wars or conflicts.

== Cast ==
- Mohanlal in a dual role as
  - Colonel Mahadevan (Son), The Grenadiers regiment
    - Dev Prayag Hari as Young Mahadevan
  - Major Sahadevan (Father), later Brigadier (Major Hoshiar Singh Dahiya), The Grenadiers regiment
- Arunoday Singh as Pak Lieutenant colonel Muhammed Akhram Raja sharif (Major Shabbir Sharif)
- Allu Sirish as Second Lieutenant Chinmay (Second Lieutenant Arun Khetarpal), Poona Horse regiment
- Renji Panicker as Lieutenant Colonel Janardanan
- Deepak Jethi as Pak Colonel Ajmal Raja (Akhram Raja's son)
- Asha Sarath as Parvathy Sahadevan, Sahadevan's wife and Mahadevan's mother
- Priyanka Agrawal as Sharif's wife
- Srushti Dange as Chinmay's wife
- Sudheer Karamana as Captain Aadhiselvam
- Jayakrishnan as Captain Anand
- Saiju Kurup as Gunner Nathan
- Padmaraj Ratheesh as Gunner Prayag
- Krishna Kumar as Havildar Sudharshan
- Manikuttan as Soldier
- Pradeep Chandran as Radio operator Abhinand
- Kannan Pattambi as Kunjikannan
- Devan as IB Director Nair IPS
- Souparnika Subhash as Nurse Fathima
- Neha Khan as Public Relations Officer
- Zoya Zayed Khan as Pakistani doctor
- Balaji Sarma as Sahadevan's friend
- Krishna Prasad as Sahadevan's friend
- Meghanathan as Sulaiman, Sahadevan's friend
- Kollam Thulasi as Sahadevan's friend
- Shaju Sreedhar as Chandru, Sahadevan's friend
- Manuraj as Geethanandhan, soldier
- Sudheer Sukumaran as Pakistan Maj.General Balukha Khan
- Vijayan Peringode as Krishna Pillai
- Sethu Lakshmi as Sahadevan's mother
- Saranya Anand as Military nurse
- Shone George as Soldier
- Tini Tom as soldier

== Production ==
Overseas distribution of 1971: Beyond Borders was handled by Josemon Simon.

=== Development ===
The film is set in two time periods, with Mohanlal playing both Colonel Mahadevan and his father Major Sahadevan (later brigadier) . The film will also see his transition from a Major to a Colonel. The film is based on a true incident and explores the friendship and life of two army officials. Mohanlal will be appearing in his fourth film as Mahadevan after Keerthi Chakra (2006), Kurukshetra (2008), and Kandahar (2010). Ravi said in an interview in October 2015, that unlike the previous films in the series, Beyond Borders will be more like his last military film Picket 43 (2015), that "the focus will be on the individuals rather than the war, and will portray the relationships that are forged during the war". Rahul Subramaniam, Siddharth Vipin, and Najim Arshad is composing the music for the film.

In early August 2016, Bollywood actor Arunoday Singh was confirmed playing the role of Lieutenant colonel (Lt. Col.) Rana Sharif, a soldier of Pakistan Army. Before zeroing in Singh, there were talks with other actors. Ravi was particularly looking for a Bollywood actor to play the role. Singh's character was modeled after a real life soldier in the Pakistan Frontier Force Regiment during the 1971 war. Ravi said, it is not a negative role that he is also fighting for his country and will have equal importance as Mahadevan. On 22 October 2016, Telugu actor Allu Sirish himself confirmed his role in the film by announcing in Twitter. He plays Lieutenant (Lt.) Chinmay, an armoured tank Commando, of the wing headed by Mahadevan. It is the Malayalam film debut of Sirish. Ravi was looking for younger actors to play the role. Mumbai-based model Priyanka Agrawal was signed to appear as Shariff's wife, in two different appearances—as a 65 year old and as her younger self. Hers is one among the two leading female roles in the film. It is also her feature film debut.

In early December 2016, it was confirmed that the production team negotiated with Nikki Galrani to play a Tamilian girl, a love interest of Chinmay, played by Sirish. She was busy with her Tamil films, but attracted as a Mohanlal film and the debut of Sirish, she agreed on verbal terms. Galrani later opted out from the film in early January 2017 due to a schedule change and conflicting date issues with some of her Tamil films in contract. Her portions opposite Sirish were supposed to be shot at Pollachi the same month. She was replaced by Srushti Dange, making her debut into Malayalam cinema. Zoya Zayed Khan was confirmed in December 2016, to play a traditional Pakistani doctor. She is acting alongside Singh. Khan was cast after a screen test. Shafeeq Rahman was cast as Jayakrishnan, one of the soldiers under Mahadevan's command. Saiju Kurup and Sudheer Karamana also plays soldiers, among others. Asha Sarath is paired opposite to Mohanlal's Sahadevan, the mother role of Mahadevan.

=== Filming ===
The filming commenced on 31 October 2016 at Suratgarh in Rajasthan, India. Art director Saloo K. George built huge sets resembling army camps and bunkers. Built in Kochi, Kerala, they were transported to Rajasthan. The filming was conducted in the deserts of Rajasthan, the Viper population was highest in that area, the crew unaware of it first, immediately ordered antivenoms and worn heavy shoes on reaching the location. Chest congestion often occurred to the crew. Sirish joined filming on 5 November 2016. Indian army base in Arjungarh, Junagarh and Mahajan in Bikaner were some of the filming locations in Rajasthan. After 25 days of filming, the schedule was wrapped on 23 November 2016. There was also a schedule in Srinagar, Jammu and Kashmir.

The next few schedules underwent at various location in Kerala, beginning in Pattambi, Palakkad district. The Indo-Pakistani war sequences were planned to shoot at Uganda, later they decided to film it in Georgia instead, following the Kerala schedule. After finishing in Pattambi, they shifted to nearby Ottapalam in early January 2017. Then to Perumbavoor, Ernakulam district in the third week of January 2017, where sets were built resembling North Indian borders and warfare trenches. It was constructed in a 40 acre reclaimed land near Perumbavoor. Mohanlal joined the location on 16 January 2017, filming held during day and night.

The team began filming its final schedule in Georgia on 31 January 2017 for a week. Beyond Borders is the first Malayalam film to be shot in the Eurasian country. Major Mahadevan's action sequences were shot in Georgia who is in a UN peacekeeping mission. The filming wrapped on 5 February 2017.

=== Music ===
The film will feature four songs composed by three music directors—Najim Arshad, Siddharth Vipin, and Rahul Subramanian. The film score is composed by Gopi Sunder. Singer Arshad debuts as a music director through the film. He composed a Hindi patriotic song written by a Kolkata-based lyricist named Kamal Karthik, the song come towards the end of the film. Vipin known for his compositions in Tamil films, is composing two songs—one is a romantic song picturised in the locations in Kerala. The other one is a motivational song that will follow after a speech delivered by Mohanlal's character. Subramanian composed a nostalgic song, sung by M. G. Sreekumar and featuring Mohanlal and Asha Sarath.

1971: Beyond Borders (soundtrack)
No.	Title	Lyrics	Music	Performer (s)	Length
1.	"Oruvakkinal Vida"	Nikhil S. Mathattil	Rahul Subrahmanian	M. G. Sreekumar, Swetha Mohan
2.	"Pesipokuthu"	Mohan Rajan	Siddharth Vipin	Vipin Lal, N. K. Priyanka, Meenakshi Ilayaraja
3.	"Armaan Hasare"	Kamal Karthik	Najim Arshad	Hariharan, Chorus (Arshad, Vipin, Shyam)
4.	"Sarhade Layi"	Kamal Karthik	Najim Arshad	Najim Arshad, Vipin Xavier
5.	"Dooreyaavani"	Jyothish T. Kassi	Siddharth Vipin	Vipin Lal, Merin Gregory, Sithara
6.	"Oruvakkinal (R)"	Nikhil S. Mathattil	Rahul Subrahmanian	Swetha Mohan, M. G. Sreekumar
7.	"Dooreyaavani (R)"	Jyothish T. Kassi	Siddharth Vipin	Vipin Lal, Sahana, Sithara

== Release ==
1971: Beyond Borders released on 7 April 2017 in India. The Telugu dubbed version titled Yuddha Bhoomi (Battlefield) was released on 29 June 2018. The Tamil version was released later. The film released in its original version on 13 April 2017 in GCC countries. The television broadcast right of 1971: Beyond Borders was bought by Amrita TV for an amount of ₹5.5 crore.

== See also ==
- List of films about 1971 India-Pakistan war
