= Kunddala Puranam =

2024 Indian Malayalam language film

- Directed by: Santhosh Puthukkunnu
- Written by: Sudheesh Kumar
- Produced by: Anil T. V.
- Starring: Indrans; Remya Suresh; Dinesh Prabhakar; Babu Annur
- Cinematography: Sharan Sasidharan
- Edited by: Ghanashyam P. K.
- Music by: Blesson Thomas
- Production company: Menokkils Films
- Release date: 28 June 2024
- Country: India
- Language: Malayalam

Kunddala Puranam is a 2024 Indian Malayalam language comedy-drama film directed by Santhosh Puthukkunnu after Moppala. The film stars Indrans, Remya Suresh, Dinesh Prabhakar, Babu Annur and Unni Raja. Film produced by Anil T. V. under the banner of Menokkils Films.

== Cast ==
- Indrans
- Remya Suresh
- Dinesh Prabhakar
- Babu Annur
- Unni Raja
- Rithesh Aramana
- Sivaani Shibin
- V. Madhusoodhanan
- K.T. Sudhakaran
- Sreeya V.

== Premise ==
Venu's well draws crowds in a parched area. His daughter Kingini loses her earrings in it, igniting conflicts that test relationships. A simple incident exposes underlying tensions.

== Music ==
The film's music was composed by Blesson Thomas and the background score was composed by Rahul Subrahmanian. The audio rights were acquired by Manorama Music. The first song "Pularumbo Thotte" was released on 31 May 2024.

Track listing
No.	Title	Lyrics	Singer(s)	Length
1.	"Pularumbo Thotte"	Santhosh Puthukkunnu	Abhaya Hiranmayi	2:25
2.	"Thattikko Thattare"	Vaisakh Sugunan	Sarath Chettanpady	4:06
3.	"Mayathen Tharame"	Vaisakh Sugunan	Najim Arshad	3:42
4.	"Mounamay"	Sathosh Puthukkunnu	Thankachan Abhi	2:00

== Release ==
The film was released in theatres on 28 June 2024.

== Reception ==
Kunddala Puranam received generally positive to mixed reviews. In his review, Rohit Panikker of Times Now gave 3.5/5 and wrote, "The Right Dose Of Feel-good That Can Be Enjoyed At Every Watch". Princy Alexander of Malayala Manorama also gave a positive review and wrote, "A simplistic tale featuring an in-form Indrans, Remya Suresh".
