= Two Countries =

- Theatrical poster
- Directed by: Shafi
- Screenplay by: Rafi
- Story by: Najeem Koya; Rafi
- Produced by: M Renjith
- Starring: Dileep; Mamta Mohandas
- Cinematography: Santhana Krishnan Ravichandran
- Edited by: V.Sajan
- Music by: Gopi Sunder
- Production company: Rejaputhra Visual media
- Release date: 25 December 2015
- Running time: 161 minutes
- Country: India
- Language: Malayalam
- Box office: ₹55 crore

Two Countries is a 2015 Indian Malayalam-language romantic comedy film written by Rafi and directed by Shafi. The film stars Dileep and Mamta Mohandas in the lead roles with Suraj Venjarammoodu, Mukesh, Aju Varghese, and Jagadish appearing in supporting roles. It was released on 25 December 2015 and became a commercial blockbuster at box office. It grossed 10 crores in just two days. The film was remade in Telugu as same name with Sunil and in Kannada with Sharan titled Adyaksha in America.

== Plot ==
The plot revolves around Ullas, a 35 year old cunning procrastinator, who makes a living by conning people in his hometown. Money is the only motivator that works for him and he wants it without any risks. He decides to marry a disabled woman, Simran, who is the sister of a Maarwadi Patelar, from whom he had borrowed some money. Patelar agreed as he wanted nothing but to put a smile on his sister's face. But Ullas' motivation behind the marriage was the assets in favour of her. A name coincidence resulted in bringing Ullas a proposal from an Indo-Canadian rich Malayali woman, Laya. He immediately agreed to the proposal, and told Patelar that he had left his interest in marrying her sister, who in turn, was furious and became violent. Immigration to Canada and easy money allure him. Only later does Ullas come to the knowledge that Laya is a chronic alcoholic. The knowledge of funds deposited in her name, that Laya cannot claim due to her alcoholism, and the possibility of access entices him however and he adjusts to the troubles.

Ullas falls in love with his alcoholic wife, and the call of a husband makes him care for Laya even in trouble. Laya learns of Ullas's original plan through Avinash, Ullas's friend, accidentally. This leads to a divorce case. Initially, Ullas gains the upper hand from the court, citing his wife is an alcoholic and needs treatment and that the divorce case is resistant towards it. Laya gets treated through a de-addiction center.

With the guidance of the doctor, Ullas goes with the divorce process to help Laya. He returns and decides to marry Simran again. Patelar reluctantly agreed as Ullas promised he wouldn't change his mind again. Later, Laya understands the role of Ullas in her wellness and decides to fly back to India to meet Ullas. Ullas on meeting her requests her to never disturb him again as he is planning to marry a woman whom he deceived before and cannot do the same again. Ullas, regretfully, dresses up and leaves for the wedding. On arrival, he discovers that it was all a play by Patelar, as Ullas is deceived by him, for his past activity towards Simran. Ullas, cried mockingly, as things went well as he was reunited with Laya.

== Cast ==
- Dileep as Ullas Kumar
  - Master Naif as Young Ullas
- Mamta Mohandas as Laya Ullas
  - Baby Parvathi as Young Laya
- Mukesh as Simon Varghese/ Achayan, Ottawa Malayali Samajam President.
- Aju Varghese as Avinash Kumbalachottil, Ullas's best friend
- Suraj Venjarammoodu as Jimmy Chokliyil, Ullas's friend in Canada
- Jagadish as Ujwal, Ullas's elder brother
- Isha Talwar as Simran, Patelar's sister
- Rafi as Daniel, Laya's father
- Ashokan as Mukundan Menon, Laya's step father
- Vinaya Prasad as Revathi, Laya's mother
- Srinda Arhaan as Jessy / Jessica, Laya's stepmother
- Lena as Adv. Susan, Simon's wife
- Sajitha Betti as Reshmi, Ujwal's wife
- Ajmal Ameer as Ullas Kumaran, a politician
- Makarand Deshpande as Patelar
- Kalasala Babu as Sukumaran Pilla, Ullas' father
- Vijayaraghavan as Kochachan, Ullas's uncle
- Shobha Mohan as Radhika, Ullas' mother
- Kalyani Nair as Usha, Avinash's wife
- Hareesh Kanaran as Sajan Koyilandy
- Balachandran Chullikadu as Kanaran Master
- J. Pallassery as Politician
- Nandu Poduval as Politician Rameshan
- Riyaz Khan as Kiran (cameo)
- Dinesh Prabhakar as Bus Driver (cameo)
- Saju Kodiyan as Chellappan (cameo)

== Production ==
Originally, the film was entitled Canadian Tharavu, but this was later changed to "2 Countries" in August 2015. Principal photography started in July 2015 in Canada by CanEast Films Ottawa (Biju George and Satheesh Gopalan) ., Nepean MPP Lisa MacLeod and Ottawa Film Commission actively helped the Team. Team Fondly remembers Lisa's help all through during the shoot. About 80 per cent of the film was shot in Ottawa at locations like ByWard Market, Rideau Canal, Almonte, Manotick, and Brockville. The filming in Canada was completed on 6 August 2015. A large part of the film was shot in Ottawa, Montreal, and a song sequence was filmed at Niagara Falls, becoming the second Malayalam film that was shot in Niagara, after I. V. Sasi directed Ezham Kadalinakkare in 1979. The filming took place over the course of a month. The second schedule held in Kochi, Kerala. The filming was finished in November 2015.Namitha Pramod signed into play second female lead but was replaced by Isha Talwar.

== Release ==
The film was released in Kerala on 25 December 2015 in the Christmas Day. It was released in theatres outside Kerala on 22 January 2016 and in 63 screens in the United Kingdom on 29 January.

== Critical reception ==
The Times of India rated 3.5 out of 5 stars and stated "Packaged with umpteen laugh-out-loud moments, Two Countries is definitely what one would expect from a Dileep movie. The screenplay by Rafi is clean, situational humour with clever quips and the actors hit the ball out of the park with their comic timing".

=== Box office ===
The film received a good opening at the box office, grossing ₹100 million (US$1.0 million) from theatres within five days. It grossed ₹178 million (US$1.8 million) in twenty days from the Kerala box office. After 40 days, the film had collected more than ₹300 million (US$3.1 million) from Kerala alone and the worldwide gross would come in much higher after adding the earnings from the rest of India and overseas markets. By this time, film already achieved the status of being one of the highest-grossing film in Malayalam. It grossed an estimated sum of ₹315 million (US$3.3 million) with a net amount of ₹249.8 million (US$2.6 million) from 60 theatres in Kerala after 44 days, with a worldwide collection of ₹500 million (US$5.2 million). After 60 days, worldwide gross was over ₹550 million (US$5.7 million).

== Soundtrack ==
The film's soundtrack contains three songs composed by Gopi Sundar and lyrics by B. K. Harinarayanan.

#	Title	Singer(s)
1	"Chenthengin"	Najim Arshad
2	"Thanne Thanne"	Karthik, Abhaya Hiranmayi
3	"Veluveluthoru"	Afsal
