= Shiju =

Shiju is a unisex given name in India, especially often for men in Kerala. Notable people with the name include:

- Shiju A R (born 1974), Indian actor
- Shiju Nambyath (born 1973), script and dialogue writer in Malayalam cinema
- Shiju Kataria (21st century), Indian television actress and producer
- Shiju Sam (born 1978), Indian-born international cricket umpire
