= Pradeep (Malayalam actor) =

Indian actor

Pradeep Chandran
- Born: Thiruvananthapuram, Kerala, India
- Occupation: Actor
- Years active: 2007-present
- Spouse: Anupama Ramachandran (m. 2020)
- Children: 1, Abhiraam

Pradeep Chandrasekharan Nair or better known as Pradeep Chandran is an Indian actor who appears in Malayalam films and television. He is best known for his role as Kunjali Marakkar in the television serial 'Kunjali Marakkar' in 2010 and DCP Abhiram IPS in the Malayalam television serial Karuthamuthu.

== Early life ==
Pradeep was born in Thiruvananthapuram, Kerala, to Chandrasekharan Nair, who is Retired Director from Short Hand Bureau of Special Branch CID, Kerala Police Department, and Valsala C Nair. He has an elder brother Pramod Chandran. Pradeep completed his master's degree in Business Administration from VLB Janakiammal College of Engineering and Technology, Anna University and then worked in Bangalore for an insurance company before entering into movies.

== Career ==
Pradeep made his acting debut in 2007 with director Major Ravi’s Mission 90 Days, where he played the role of a commando along with Mammooty, the top investigating officer. After this he appeared in multiple movies like Kurukshetra, Kandahar, Ividam Swargamanu, Lokpal, Geethaanjali, Loham, Oppam, Drishyam, 12th Man. He has shared screen space with actor Mohanlal in many of his movies. Pradeep has also acted in a Sanskrit movie Madhurasmitham മധുരസ്മിതം as an IAS Officer where he can be seen encouraging school students on life lessons.

Pradeep made his television debut in 2010 through serial “Kunjali Marakkar” on Asianet, for which he won the Asianet Television Awards 2011 for Best Debut Actor. His most notable work in television came across in the year 2017, when he got the opportunity to play the role of DCP Abhiram IPS in Malayalam television serial Karuthamuthu, which made Pradeep popular among the Malayalee audience.

In January 2020, he entered as a contestant in the Malayalam reality TV show Bigg Boss Season 2.

== Personal life ==
On 12 July 2020, he married Anupama Ramachandran. They have a son Abhiraam.

== Filmography ==
Year	Title	Role
2007	Mission 90 Days	NSG Commando
2008	Kurukshetra	Saravanan
2009	Angel John	Gangster
2009	Evidam Swargamanu	Shibu Areekutty
2010	Kandahar	Senior Officer
2011	Vaadamalli	Police officer / Brother
2012	Karmayodha	Cameo
2012	Nizhal/Anabella	
2012	Simhasanam	Cheriyappilli Sadaananthan
2013	Drishyam	The new Sub Inspector
2013	Oru Yathrayil	One of the Director
2013	Geethaanjali	Doctor
2013	Lokpal	C I Sunil
2014	Naku Penta Naku Taka	Customs officer
2015	Loham	Biju
2016	Oppam	Asst. Commissioner George
2017	Villain	SI
2017	1971: Beyond Borders	Radio operator Abhinand
2019	Sanskrit Movie Madhurasmitham മധുരസ്മിതം	IAS Officer
2022	12th Man	CI Vipin
2023	Kakkipada	SI Stephen Varghese
2023	Kaapa	CI Joy Poommattam
2023	Garudan	CI Suresh Karunakaran
2025	Thudarum	CPO Sadanandan

== Television ==
=== Serials ===
Year	Title	Role	Channel	Language
2010	Kunjali Marakkar	Kunjali Marakkar(Hero)	Asianet	Malayalam
2017-2019	Karuthamuthu	DCP Abhiram IPS(Hero)	Asianet	Malayalam
2020	Padatha Painkili	Aravind(Villain)	Asianet	Malayalam
2025	Archana Chechi LLB	Advocate Vijay Shankar(Hero)	Mazhavil Manorama	Malayalam

=== Programs ===
Year	Program	Channel	Notes
2017	Onappooram Season 2	Asianet	Participant
2017	Comedy Stars Season 2	Asianet	Guest
2018	Urvashi Theatres	Asianet	Participant
2018	Onapookalam	Asianet	Guest
2018	Sell me the answer season 3	Asianet	Participant
2019	Comedy Stars Season 2	Asianet	Guest
2019	Shappile Kariyum Naavile Ruchiyum	Asianet	Guest
2019	Start Music	Asianet	Contestant
2019	Onamamangam	Surya Tv	Participant
2019	Keralolsavam	Surya Tv	Participant
2019	Badai Bungalow	Asianet	Guest
2020	Comedy Stars Season 2	Asianet	Guest
2020	Star Magic	Flowers TV	Guest
2020	Start Music Season 2	Asianet	Contestant
2021	Day with a Star Season 2	Kaumudy TV	Guest
2021	Haritham Sundaram	Kaumudy TV	Guest
2021	Red Carpet	Amrita TV	Guest
2021	Big B Dhamaka	Asianet	Participant
2022	Vanchippattum Vallasadyayum	Jaihind	Anchor
2025	Serial Mamangam	Mazhavil Manorama	Contestant

=== Reality shows ===
Year	Program	Channel	Notes
2020	Bigg Boss Season 2	Asianet	Contestant

=== Web series ===
Year	Program	Channel	Notes
2021	Boeing Boeing WebSeries	YouTube	Actor

== Awards and nominations ==
=== Asianet Television Awards, 2011 ===
- Best Debutant Actor – Kunjali Marakkar

=== Asianet Television Awards, 2018 ===
- Most popular Actor (Nominated) – Karuthamuthu
- Best pair (Nominated) – Karuthamuthu
