= Beyond Borders =

Beyond Borders may refer to:

- 1971: Beyond Borders, a 2017 Indian Malayalam-language war film
- Beyond Borders (film), a 2003 American romantic-drama film about aid workers
- Criminal Minds: Beyond Borders, an American police procedural television series
