= Oru Yathrayil =

- Directed by: Rajesh Amanakkara; Mathew Scaria; Priyanandanan; Major Ravi
- Produced by: Siby Thottappuram; Joby Mundamattam; Mathews
- Starring: Kannan Pattambi; Pooja; Jayan Cherthala; Lakshmi Gopalaswami; Vineeth Kumar; Remya Nambeesan; Janardhanan; Sukumari
- Cinematography: Sanjeev Shankar; Pratap P. Nair; Vel Raj
- Music by: Anil Panachooran
- Distributed by: S. J. M. Entertainment
- Release date: 18 January 2013
- Running time: 150 minutes
- Country: India
- Language: Malayalam

Oru Yathrayil is a 2013 Indian Malayalam anthology film. The film comprises four shorts namely Honeymoon, I Love My Appa, Marichavarude Kadal and Amma which all are half an hour long each. The four featurettes are directed by Rajesh Amanakkara, Mathews, Priyanandanan and Major Ravi respectively. Major Ravi coordinated the efforts for the film.

Another featurette titled Sarvashiksha Abhiyan directed by Vinod Vijayan was originally announced but was not included in the final print.

== Films ==
No.	Title	Director	Writer	Editor	Cinematographer	Actors
1	Honeymoon	Rajesh Amanakara		Hariharaputhran	Sanjeev Shankar	Kannan Pattambi, Pooja, Kulappulli Leela, Rani Larius
2	I Love My Appa	Mathew Scaria	Major Ravi	Kapil G.	Sanjeev Shankar	Jayan Cherthala, Lakshmi Gopalaswami, Master Vivas, Subbalakshmi
3	Marichavarude Kadal	Priyanandanan	Priyanandanan	Venugopal	Pratap P. Nair	Vineeth Kumar, Remya Nambeesan, C. K. Babu
4	Amma	Major Ravi	Major Ravi	Donmax	Velraj	Janardhanan, Sukumari, Jayakrishnan, Manikandan Pattambi, Valsala Menon

== Common Cast ==
- Anoop Chandran
- Bineesh Kodiyeri
- Rajeev Pillai
- Jayakrishnan
- Pradeep Chandran

== Plots ==
Honeymoon is a take on the life of a newlywed couple in the backdrop of a slum. I Love My Appa is a family drama set in the backdrop of a typical Brahmin colony in Kalpathy in Palakkad. Marichavarude Kadal is about the decline of Gandhian principles in the modern era. It flits between past and present, as the tale of an elderly couple wedded to Gandhism is narrated, in the backdrop of sea. The sea, here is a symbol of the watery end of the great ideals of Mahatma Gandhi. Amma is a tale of an elderly housewife who yearns for love and attention from her husband and grown up children.
