= Abhaya Hiranmayi =

Indian playback singer

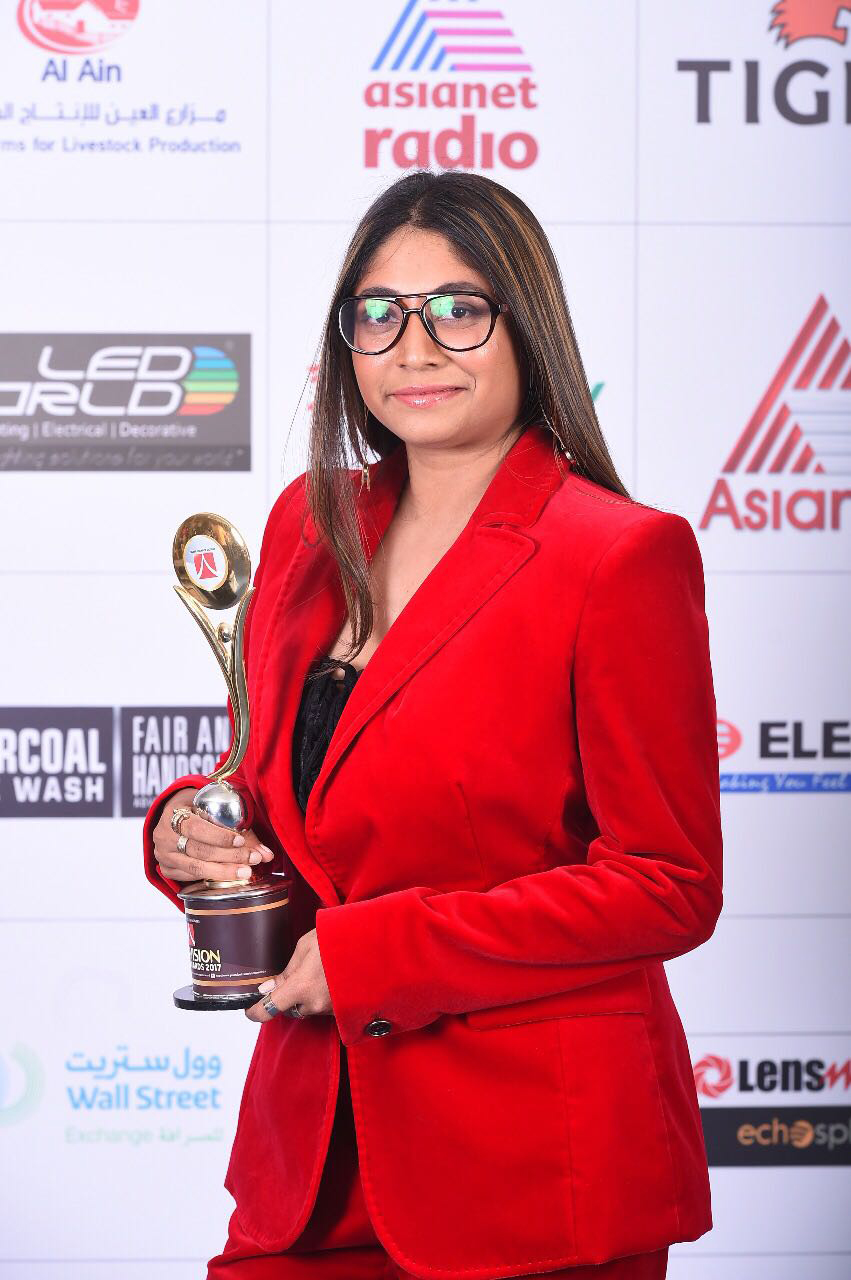

Background information
- Born: Thiruvananthapuram, India
- Occupations: Playback Singer, Actress
- Years active: 2014–present

Abhaya Hiranmayi is an Indian playback singer. She has recorded songs and provided backing vocals for film music in Malayalam and Telugu languages.

== Early life and education ==
Born in a creatively inclined family in Thiruvananthapuram, Kerala. Hiranmayi did not take up any formal training in music until later. She learnt the basics of music from her mother Lathika, a postgraduate in music and a disciple of Prof. Neyyattinkara M.K. Mohanachandran and gained further knowledge by passively listening to musical lessons conducted by her father's brother, a professor at Swati Thirunal College of Music. Her father G. Mohan, was a programme producer for Doordarshan Kendra.

Hiranmayi grew up in Thiruvananthapuram where she attended Carmel School.

Abhaya was in a live-in relationship with composer Gopi Sundar, and in July 2018, Sundar revealed that they had been together for 9 years. In May 2022, Gopi Sundar declared their break up by confirming his relationship with the singer Amrutha Suresh.

== Career ==
Hiranmayi started off her career in 2014 providing backing vocals for Malayalam film songs. She made her debut through the song "Naku Penta Naku Taka" from the eponymous film, providing backup vocals in a Swahili dialect. It was followed by "Thanne Thanne" from Dileep-Mamta Mohandas starrer Two Countries whose music composer, Gopi Sundar, used her voice as an interlude to the song. The same year, she crooned the song "Choti Zindagi" for the Telugu film Malli Malli Idi Rani Roju. In 2016, she lent her vocals for the romantic ballad "Mazhaye Mazhaye" along with Karthik for the film James & Alice followed by Sathya directed by late Diphan and in the following year, "Koyikode Song", an ode to Kozhikode and its rustic music, composed by her longtime collaborator, Gopi Sundar for the Malayalam film Goodalochana became an instant hit post its release and got her first award at Asiavision Awards for excellence in singing.

== Discography ==
List of Abhaya Hiranmayi film song credits
Year	Film	Song	Composer	Ref.
2014	Naku Penta Naku Taka	"Naku Penta, Naku Taka"	Gopi Sundar	
2015	Vishwasam Athallae Ellaam	"No Foolakking"	Gopi Sundar	
2015	Malli Malli Idi Rani Roju	"Choti Zinagi"	Gopi Sundar	
2015	Two Countries	"Thanne Thanne"	Gopi Sundar	
2015	James and Alice	"Mazhaye Mazhaye"	Gopi Sundar	
2017	Satya	"Njan Ninne Thedivarum"	Gopi Sundar	
2017	Goodalochana	"Koyikode Song"	Gopi Sundar	
2017	Two Countries	"Cheliya Cheliya Vidipoke Kalala"	Gopi Sundar	
2020	Joshua	"Cheliya Konda Konda Kondattom"	Gopi Sundar	
2024	Malaikottai Vaaliban	"Punnara Kattile Poovanatthil"	Prashant Pillai	
2024	Kunddala Puranam	"Pularumbo Thotte"	Blesson Thomas	

== Filmography ==
Key
†	Denotes films that have not yet been released

- All films are in Malayalam language unless otherwise noted.

Year	Title	Role	Notes
2024	Pani	Jaya, Davi's Wife	Debut
