= Santosh Sleeba =

Santosh Sleeba is an actor in Malayalam film industry.

== Biography ==
Santosh Sleeba was born on 16 March 1972 in Ernakulam district. He did his diploma in pharmaceuticals. Started a living by helping his father's medical business. His passion for acting bloomed later when he got a break in the Mohanlal film, Grandmaster, as a cop. He then continued his career with films like Nakhangal, Spirit, Nee Ko Njaa Cha, Karmayodha. Surprisingly, he has played as a cop in all his films. He is also an integral part of Pooja Cricket tournament in Tripunitara and also plays an important part in Tripunitara Cricket club. He is also a part of Kerala Strikers of Celebrity Cricket League.

== Filmography ==
- Grandmaster - 2012
- Nee Ko Njaa Cha - 2012
- Spirit - 2012
- Nakhangal - 2013
- Karmayodha - 2013
