= Housefull (2013 film) =

- Theatrical release poster
- Directed by: Linson Antony
- Screenplay by: Shiju Nambyath
- Story by: Shiju Nambyath
- Produced by: Jomon Antony
- Starring: Tini Tom; Jyothirmayi
- Cinematography: Neil D'Cunha
- Edited by: Shyam Sasidhar
- Music by: Ram Surender; Sejo John
- Production company: Movie Masters
- Distributed by: Movie Masters Release; Kalasangham Films
- Release date: 15 February 2013 (India)
- Running time: 127 minutes
- Country: India
- Language: Malayalam
- Box office: ₹31 crore (US$3.2 million)

Housefull (also stylized as House Full) is a 2013 Indian Malayalam-language family drama film directed by Linson Antony. The film stars Tini Tom, Jyothirmayi and Shammi Thilakan, and released on 15 February 2013. Filming for Housefull had begun in mid-2012, with the film marking Tom's first leading role.

== Synopsis ==
Ananthan, a 36-year-old police constable who has experienced multiple failures at trying to find a woman to marry. He eventually meets and marries Emily, a textile worker, much to the chagrin of both of their families. The couple tried for a baby in the hopes of placating their family, but were unable to conceive and began a series of fertility treatments. Initially overjoyed when the treatments are successful, Ananthan and Emily are shocked to discover that she was now pregnant with quadruplets.

== Cast ==
- Tini Tom as Constable Anantha Krishnan J, later SI
- Jyothirmayi as Emily
- Shammi Thilakan as Kiliyaachan
- Vijayaraghavan as Cherukkappan (Susheelan Nair)
- Guinness Pakru as Dr. Shenayi
- Kalasala Babu as Janardhanan Nair
- Bhagath Manuel as Constable Joe
- Bheeman Raghu as DYSP Benjamin Joseph
- Nandu as Constable Mohammed Pookunju
- Lakshmi Priya as Constable Mumthaz
- Surabhi Lakshmi as Constable Mercy
- Anjana Appukuttan as Constable Sugunavalli
- Binu Adimali as Espade
- Gomathi Mahadevan as Ananthan's mother
- Abu Salim as ASP Sharafudeen IPS
- Sonia
- Durga Premjith as Sarayu's daughter

== Production ==
Tini Tom, after doing comic and character roles in over 30 films, was given his first lead role in a film by debutant director Linson Antony, who had previously directed several devotional videos. Jyothirmayi, who was not seen in a commercial film for a longer time, was chosen to portray the character of a saleswoman at a textile shop. Four babies were reported to be playing the lead alongside actors Tini Tom and Jyothirmayi, with auditions being held in July 2012 to find "the best ones". The actors were continuously shooting for Housefull for 40 days throughout September and October 2012, with Jyothirmayi stating that the shoot took more days than what was initially planned, because of the four children involved.

== Reception ==
=== Critical response ===
Housefull was received mixed review, with a reviewer for Sify giving a neutral review and stating that it was a "meek entertainer, which treads along a rather safe path". Sreenath Nair of The Hindu was critical of the film, citing that there were "no situations in the script and screenplay by Shiju Nambiath which offer the director a challenge. The duo walks down the much-tread and familiar story lanes to reach a commonplace end".
