= Rohini Mariam Idicula =

Indian actress, anchor and model

- Born: Neerattupuram, Tiruvalla, Kerala, India
- Education: Government Law College, Ernakulam
- Occupations: Model, actress, television anchor
- Years active: 2013–present
- Parent(s): Idicula Mathew; Beena Mathew
- Awards: Impresario Miss Kerala 2007; 2nd Runners Up : Miss Navy Queen 2002

Rohini Mariam Idicula is an Indian actress, anchor and model known for her work in Malayalam films.

She was crowned as 2nd runner up Navy Queen in 2002, in the same year she passed the state level law entrance exams with the 10th rank. She was later crowned as Impresario Miss Kerala 2007 along with subtitle Miss Perfect 10 for both the beauty pageants.

She played the lead role in the critically acclaimed South Indian Avant Garde film ‘Karma Cartel’ which was screened in several renowned film festival across the US, Canada and Italy. It picked up awards in the excellence in film-making in the Canadian International Film Festival and the Debut Director Award at the American Movie Awards in Nevada.

Her debut in the Malayalam suspense-thriller ‘Nee Ko Njaa Cha’ .She was one of the female lead in that movie along with Poojitha Menon, Sija Rose and Parvathy Nair.

== Early life ==
Rohini Mariam Idicula was born in 1984. She hails from Southern Kerala from a place named Neerattupuram in Thiruvalla, Kerala. She was born to Idicula Mathew and Beena Mathew as the youngest daughter. Her father served as Chief Accountant for Lee plastics in Nigeria while, her mother managed the home.

== Education ==
She was raised in the city of Cochin and went to Chinmaya Vidyalaya. She holds bachelor's degree in law (LL.B) from Government Law College, Ernakulam and pursued masters in Human Rights from University of Warwick, UK.

== Career ==
She is a model, emcee, VJ by profession and a lawyer by educational qualification. She proved to be a successful model by bagging the 2nd runner-up position at the Navy Queen 2002 and the title of Miss Kerala 2007 along with Perfect 10 for both the beauty pageants.

She appeared on small screen by acting in TV commercials and hosting chat shows. The first ever show she emceed for was Tata Motors corporate event.

She has also marked her name as a successful VJ by hosting a chat show named ‘Star Jam’ in Kappa TV.The show received immense attention for its candid feel. She has interviewed many celebrities such as Rahman (actor), Lena (actress), Neeraj Madhav etc. She acted in the critically acclaimed ‘Karma Cartel’ and a Malayalam movie ‘Nee Ko Njaa Cha’.

== Filmography ==
Year	Film	Director	Language
2013	Nee Ko Njaa Cha	Gireesh	Malayalam
2015	Karma Cartel	Vinodh Bharathan	Malayalam

== Achievements ==
- 2001 - Navy Queen 2001 : 2nd Runners Up
- 2007 - Femina Miss Kerala 2007
