= Karmayodha =

2012 Indian film

- Theatrical release poster
- Directed by: Major Ravi
- Written by: Shaji S. V. Sumesh V. Robin; Reji Mathew
- Produced by: Haneef Mohammed; Major Ravi
- Starring: Mohanlal; Murali Sharma
- Cinematography: Pradeep Nair
- Edited by: Don Max
- Music by: M. G. Sreekumar
- Production companies: Red Rose Creations; M. R. Productions
- Distributed by: Red Rose Release; PJ Entertainments (Europe)
- Release date: 21 December 2012
- Country: India
- Language: Malayalam

Karmayodha is a 2012 Indian Malayalam-language action thriller film directed and co-produced by Major Ravi. It stars Mohanlal, with Murali Sharma, Mukesh, Sai Kumar, Bineesh Kodiyeri, Rajeev Pillai, Asha Sarath, Aishwarya Devan, Malavika Nair, Janardhanan and Riyaz Khan in supporting roles. The soundtrack was composed by M. G. Sreekumar; the background score was provided by Jeffrey Jonathan.

Karmayodha was released on 21 December 2012. It was dubbed in Tamil as Vetrimaran IPS. Ahead of its release, the film became embroiled in a legal dispute when Reji Mathew alleged unauthorized use of his story, screenplay, and dialogues. In November 2025, the Commercial Court of Kottayam ruled that the authorship belonged to Mathew, awarding him ₹30 lakh in compensation and the copyright of the film.

== Plot ==
Madhavan Menon alias Mad Maddy is a ruthless and psychotic cop working with the Mumbai Police. He is an encounter specialist who makes decisions on the spot, without always waiting for orders from the top.

His latest assignment is to investigate the missing of a teenage school girl from Mumbai. He reaches Kerala on being tipped off that the girl could be taken to Kerala.

In the meantime, another girl gets kidnapped in Kerala, presumably by the same people or people linked to them. There is also information that some other girls too have been kidnapped. Following the leads, Maddy comes to the conclusion that all the girls have been abducted by a Kerala-based sex trafficking racket led by a psychotic pimp named Khais Khanna, who had a grudge on Maddy.

As long ago, when Khanna kidnaps a girl, Maddy comes to save her. When Khanna try to attack Maddy, Maddy stab at Khanna's penis with a knife, resulting Khanna to lose his penis permanently.

Maddy embarks on a mission to eliminate the racket and save the girls, including his daughter Diya. Finally, Maddy kills Khanna and rescues his daughter along with the other girls with the help of his colleagues.

== Cast ==
- Mohanlal as DCP Madhavan Menon IPS ("Mad Maddy"), a psychotic Mumbai Police officer and encounter specialist
- Murali Sharma as Khais Khanna, a psychotic pimp (voiceover by Shobi Thilakan)
- Mukesh as SI Balendran, Kovalam Police Station
- Rajeev Pillai as ACP Tony Varghese IPS, Mumbai Police officer
- Asha Sarath as Arathi Madhavan, Maddy's wife
- Sai Kumar as Cantonment ACP Nadhakumar IPS
- Pradeep Chandran as Prathap Nair
- Bineesh Kodiyeri as Manu
- Shaalin as Renuka
- Aishwarya Devan as Mercy
- Sona Heiden as Selena, Khais Khanna's leader
- Malavika Nair as Diya Madhavan, Maddy's daughter
- Kannan Pattambi as Thenkasi Selvam (Dubbed by Major Ravi)
- Riyaz Khan as Sathan Sunny
- Vishnu Hariharan as Fazal
- Sarayu as Asha
- Sudheer Karamana as Anoob
- Anil Murali as Suraa
- Santosh Sleeba as Range IG Joseph George IPS
- Janardhanan as Narayana Menon
- Sukumari as Gouriamma, Maddy's mother
- Gayathri Varsha as Janu, Balendran's wife
- Jayakrishnan as District Collector Muhammad Riyaz IAS
- Bindu Ramakrishnan as Devikamma, Manu's mother
- Lakshmi Menon as Divya
- Sasi Kalinga as Chachaji
- Dr Rony David as City Police Commissioner Rajesh Kumar IPS, Mumbai Police (Voice Dubbed By Vijay Babu)
- Nandu as Dr Rathesh

== Production ==
Notably, Karmayodha is not set in the military backdrop that had characterised all other Mohanlal–Major Ravi films. "Mohanlal's characterisation is similar to Denzel Washington's in the action film Man On Fire, which is about a single man on a mission who doesn't play by the rules to reach there," says Ravi.

The pooja ceremony of the film was held on 7 July 2012 at the BTH Sarovaram Hotel in Cochin, India. The film was shot on locations in Mumbai, Cochin, Munnar and Nagercoil. Filming began in August 2012.

== Soundtrack ==
Karmayodha

Soundtrack album by M. G. Sreekumar
- Released: 25 November 2012
- Recorded: 2012
- Genre: Film soundtrack
- Length: 15:28
- Language: Malayalam
- Label: Music Zone
- Producer: M. G. Sreekumar

M. G. Sreekumar chronology
Ardhanaari (2012)	Karmayodha (2012)

The soundtrack was composed by M. G. Sreekumar, with lyrics by Dr. Madhu Vasudevan. The album was launched on 25 November 2012 at IMA Hall in Kochi. The background score for the film was provided by Jeffrey Jonathan. The film features Murukan Kattakada's poem "Kannada", which has been rendered by the poet himself.

Track listing
No.	Title	Lyrics	Singer(s)	Length
1.	"Mooliyo Vimookamay"	Madhu Vasudevan	Najim Arshad	4:20
2.	"Karmayodha Theme"	Madhu Vasudevan	Jeffrey Jonathan	2:55
3.	"Ellavarkkum"	Murukan Kattakada	Murukan Kattakada	3:40
4.	"Karmayodha Rap"	Madhu Vasudevan	Jeffrey Jonathan	4:20
Total length:				15:28

== Release ==
The film's premiere show was held on 20 December 2012 in Dubai, United Arab Emirates. The worldwide release took place on 21 December 2012. The film was distributed in Kerala by Red Rose Release. Karmayodha was released in Europe and the UAE on 27 December 2012.

=== Marketing ===
The film's teaser featured the song "American VI: Ain't No Grave" by American musician Johnny Cash. It was the first time that an English track was being used in a Malayalam film. The makers also gave credit to Cash's song. Ravi stated that, "I thought it truly complemented the Mexican-style footage that was used for the teaser. Though the song is a free template that's been made available by its producers to be used by anyone, we have also given the due credit".

== Critical reception ==
The film opened to mixed reviews.

Rediff.com rated the movie 2 out of 5, saying: "Karmayodha is not worth watching". Indiaglitz gave the film an average rating of 5.9/10, saying that "Karmayodha may satisfy the die-hard Mohanlal fans."

Sify.com said: "A rather flimsy plot, some bad performances, silly lines and villains who are unintentionally comical make you cringe in the seats. The plot moves ahead without a definite aim or direction with some weak links that barely look convincing."

== Legal dispute ==
A month prior to the film’s release, Reji Mathew filed a legal suit alleging that the film had used his story, screenplay, and dialogues without permission, seeking a stay on its release. The court allowed the film to be released on the condition that ₹5 lakh be deposited with the court and that a note be displayed stating that there was an ongoing dispute regarding the story, screenplay, and dialogues. Despite this, the film was released with writing credits attributed to Shaji S. V. and Sumesh V. Robin. Subsequently, Mathew approached the court again seeking compensation, naming Ravi, Haneef Mohammed, Shaji S. V., and Sumesh V. Robin as the accused parties. In November 2025, the Commercial Court, Kottayam ruled that the film's authorship belonged to Mathew, directing the defendants to pay ₹30 lakh as compensation and awarding him the copyright of the film.
