= Picket 43 =

2015 Indian film

- Theatrical release poster
- Directed by: Major Ravi
- Written by: Major Ravi
- Produced by: O. G. Sunil
- Starring: Prithviraj Sukumaran; Javed Jaffrey
- Narrated by: Mohanlal
- Cinematography: Jomon T. John
- Edited by: Ranjan Abraham
- Music by: Songs: Ratheesh Vegha; Background Score: Rex Vijayan
- Production company: Film Brewery
- Distributed by: Murali Films
- Release date: 23 January 2015
- Running time: 167 Minutes
- Country: India
- Language: Malayalam

Picket 43 is a 2015 Indian Malayalam-language anti-war film written and directed by Major Ravi, starring Prithviraj Sukumaran and Javed Jaffrey. The story centers on Harindran Nair, an Indian Army havildar stationed at a remote picket along the Line of Control, where he forms an unlikely yet profound friendship with Mushraff Khan, a soldier from the Pakistan Army stationed behind enemy lines.

The film was predominantly shot in Kashmir, with a few scenes in Ottappalam. Picket 43 was released on 23 January 2015 to generally positive reviews from critics. It was a profitable film considering theatrical collection and revenue from selling rights.

== Plot ==
Harindran Nair, an Indian soldier, is assigned to guard an isolated Indian border post called Picket 43 in Kashmir. Known to be a high-risk area, Harindran is compelled by his superior officer to take on this duty, even though he had been granted leave. His only companion at the picket is a trained dog named Baccardi, whom Harindran treats with deep respect, regarding the dog almost as a human partner and forbidding others from calling Baccardi a mere "dog". He shares his thoughts and emotions with Baccardi, which helps him endure the isolation and challenges of his post.

It is gradually revealed that Harindran's leave had been planned so he could marry his cousin, whom he loves. However, his marriage proposal had been rejected by his uncle in favor of a wealthier suitor from Dubai. Determined to marry her, Harindran had planned a registry marriage during his next leave. This disappointment over his canceled leave contributes to his initial despondence at the picket.

During his first eight months at Picket 43, Harindran encounters a hostile Pakistani soldier stationed at an opposing border post. However, this soldier is eventually replaced by Mushraff, a more amiable Pakistani ranger. Despite their differing nationalities, Harindran and Mushraff find common ground, gradually developing a close friendship that lifts their spirits amid the harsh conditions.

One day, terrorists launch an attack on the border. Mushraff is fatally wounded while supporting Harindran, who, despite being alone, manages to repel the attack, neutralizing all the militants. As reinforcements arrive, Harindran urgently requests that Mushraff receive medical attention, warning that he would cross the Line of Control (L.O.C.) himself if aid does not arrive swiftly. Medics eventually arrive, and it is revealed that Mushraff survives.

In recognition of his courage, Harindran is honored by his commanding officer and recommended for the Shaurya Chakra award. The story highlights the sacrifices made by soldiers in protecting the nation and serves as a reflection on the shared humanity and bonds that can form even across hostile borders.

== Cast ==
- Prithviraj Sukumaran as Havildar Harindran 'Hari' Nair
- Javed Jaffrey as Mushraff Khan, Pakistani soldier
- Hakka a.k.a. Bacardi as Bacardi, a Labrador Retriever
- Renji Panicker as C.O Vinay Chandran
- Sudheer Karamana as Rajan Pattambi
- Kannan Nair
- Meghanathan as Subedar Major Thampi
- Hareesh Peradi as Lakshmi's father
- Angana Roy as Hanara
- Anu Mohan as Soldier Dineshan
- Anshu Sharma as Lakshmi
- Shobha Mohan as Hari's mother
- Madan Mohan
- Allan Varghese Chandy

== Theme ==
Instead of focusing on devastating wars and the like, the movie deals more with the psychological trauma a soldier has to go through in order to safeguard his motherland. It also throws light on the fact that friendship is not based on certain rules or conventions and that the key factor for a true friendship is to have a better understanding and compassion for each other. It also explains how a faithful dog can turn out to be your confidante when you feel alone and dejected.

== Production ==
Initially, Ravi developed the film with Mohanlal in the lead role as the next installment in the Major Mahadevan film series. However, Mohanlal felt the character was not suited to his age and recommended casting a younger actor. He was also uncertain about how a lower-ranking Havildar Mahadevan would align with the series. Ultimately, he suggested Prithviraj Sukumaran for the role. Ravi stated that Havildar Harindran was originally written as a heroic character, but this aspect was later softened following Prithviraj's suggestion. For the role of Harindran's companion dog, he cast Hakka, also known as Bacardi, a trained Labrador Retriever with six years of service as a tracker dog for the Indian Army. However, the dog died before the film's release.

Prithviraj joined the film's shooting in Kashmir in March 2014. Home portions of the film was shot in Ottappalam, Kerala. The film was shot over three to four seasons in Jammu and Kashmir. During filming, Major Mukund Varadarajan, who was assisting the crew, was killed in combat in the Shopian area. Protection for the team was provided by army friends of Ravi, himself a retired Major. Ravi dedicated Picket 43 as a tribute to Major Varadarajan. Originally scheduled for 35 days, filming was completed in just 22 days.

== Release ==
Picket 43 was released in theatres on 23 January 2015. It was later released for digital streaming on Amazon Prime Video in multiple dubbed languages.

=== Critical response ===
Mythily Ramachandran of Gulf News gave a positive review, noting that "shorn of regular melodrama and mindless song dance sequences, this story has an enjoyable freshness. Picket 43 makes you pause and remember those valiant soldiers who face death at every moment", also praising the "breathtaking" cinematography. Shruti Karthikeyan of The Times of India remarked that the director has "stitched a film that says– let humanity prevail and the countries live in peace", also praising its music and "breath-taking visuals". Paresh C. Palicha of Rediff.com wrote that "Picket 43 is the best film in Major Ravi's oeuvre and deserves to be seen despite its shortcomings".

In 2022, filmmaker Alphonse Putharen wrote a social media post requesting Major Ravi to make a film like Picket 43 again. Putharen expressed his admiration, saying "when I saw this long back I was very happy watching it. I thought it was a war story in the beginning. But it was nice to see a different perspective of military people from a person like you sir. Or should I tell this to Prithviraj to tell you do a film like that. It was a pleasant heart touching movie ..." In a retrospective analysis in 2024, Megha M. of Mathrubhumi wrote that "the director's thoughtful approach creates tension and unease, drawing the viewer in. A slow-burning pace and minimalist approach add to the impact, making for a powerful and moving experience. It is a must-watch for fans of war dramas and meaningful storytelling".

=== Box office ===
In April 2015, a spokesperson from the Kerala Film Producers Association said that Picket 43 had a long run at the theatres, but collected just ₹1.8 crore from Kerala. However, later taking opinions from trade analysts, Hindustan Times and Manorama Online wrote that the film was one among the commercially successful Malayalam films of that year.

In March 2015, producer O. G. Sunil filed a complaint against Ravi with the Kerala Film Producers Association, citing a cost overrun of ₹70 lakh beyond the agreed ₹4 crore budget.
