= Nee Ko Njaa Cha =

Nee Ko Njaa Cha (Ninnem Kollum Njanum Chavum)
- Directed by: Gireesh Mano
- Written by: Gireesh Mano
- Produced by: Sandip Senan; Anish M. Thomas
- Starring: Sunny Wayne; Sanju Sivram; Praveen Anidil; Poojitha Menon; Sija Rose; Rohini Mariam Idicula; Parvathy Nair
- Cinematography: Neil D'Cunha
- Edited by: Manoj
- Music by: Prashant Pillai; Gopi Sundar
- Production company: Urvasi Theatres
- Release date: 4 January 2013
- Running time: 114 minutes
- Country: India
- Language: Malayalam
- Box office: ₹2.35 crore (US$250,000)

Nee Ko Njaa Cha (acronym of Ninnem Kollum Njaanum Chavum) (English: I Will Kill You And Kill Myself) is a 2013 Indian Malayalam-language comedy thriller film written and directed by Gireesh Mano.

The story, set in Kochi and Goa, follows the lives of three friends played by Sunny Wayne, Sanju and Praveen Anidil. Poojitha Menon, Sija Rose, Rohini Mariam Idicula and Parvathy Nair form the female leads. It is an unofficial remake of the 2008 American film Forgetting Sarah Marshall. Shooting was carried out in Goa and some shots in Kochi.

== Plot ==
Roshan is a cosmetic surgeon and a casanova by nature. Abu, a budding filmmaker and Joe, a TV show producer, are his friends. Joe has just been ditched by his girl friend Ann. A devastated Joe heads over to Goa along with his friends to get over the tragedy that has befallen him. At Goa, Roshan and Abu have a merry time with "spicy girls" Alice and Sania, while Joe stalks Ann who has arrived at the beach town as well with her new boy friend Peter. Meanwhile, Joe falls for Anjali, a hotel receptionist, and he decides to stay in Goa even after his friends leave for Kochi.

After all the adventure, Roshan and Abu, on their way back to Kochi, receive a phone call from the "spicy girls" informing that one of them is an AIDS patient and by now either Roshan or Abu will be infected. Roshan and Abu return to Goa to know more about the girls but in vain. A few days pass and then they get another call from the spicy girls informing that the infected one is Roshan. They also inform that they did this not out of sadism but was taking revenge on Roshan who had ditched their best friend Anita George who turned into a lunatic after the breakup and committed suicide. Roshan is devastated by the news of his disease. He feels a kind of loneliness.

Once he finds his ex-wife Maya with another man which adds to his feelings. It is shown that Roshan and Maya have been separated since six months after Maya discovers that her husband has been cheating her. When Roshan finds everyone moving away from him, he feels very lonely and decides to commit suicide. However, in the final scene, it is shown that the whole Goa episode was a trap planned by Maya, Abu and the spicy girls to prove Roshan the value of relationship.

== Cast ==
- Sunny Wayne as Dr.Roshan Fenwickman
- Sanju Sivram as Abu Hameed Griekman
- Praveen Anidil as Joe Bilsken
- Poojitha Menon as Ann Mathews
- Sija Rose as Anjali Menon
- Arun Benny as Pappu Timmytom
- Rohini Mariam Idicula as Alice
- Parvathy Nair as Sania
- Santosh Sleeba as Police
- Mithun Ramesh Guest Appearance
- Merin Mathew as Maya
- Shani as Peter Maximus
- Shammi Thilakan as Ravi Kumar K.V. (Police Sub Inspector)Guest Appearance

== Reception ==
The film received mixed to positive reviews upon release. Veeyen of Nowrunning.com gave the film rating and said, "Nee Ko Njaa Cha is a scattershot film that throws in a few sex jokes together, hoping to make a point eventually." Sify.com's reviewer gave the verdict as "Average" and said that the movie is "for those who are looking for brainless fun." The reviewer was highly critical about the cast performances and was not impressed with the direction or technical expertise. According to EnteCity, which rated the film, "The first half is a rip-rocker while the 2nd half though slower isn't bad either leading up to a good unexpected climax. On the whole, it's a good entertainer which is likely to be accepted by the youth."
