= Blesson Thomas =

Indian music and film director

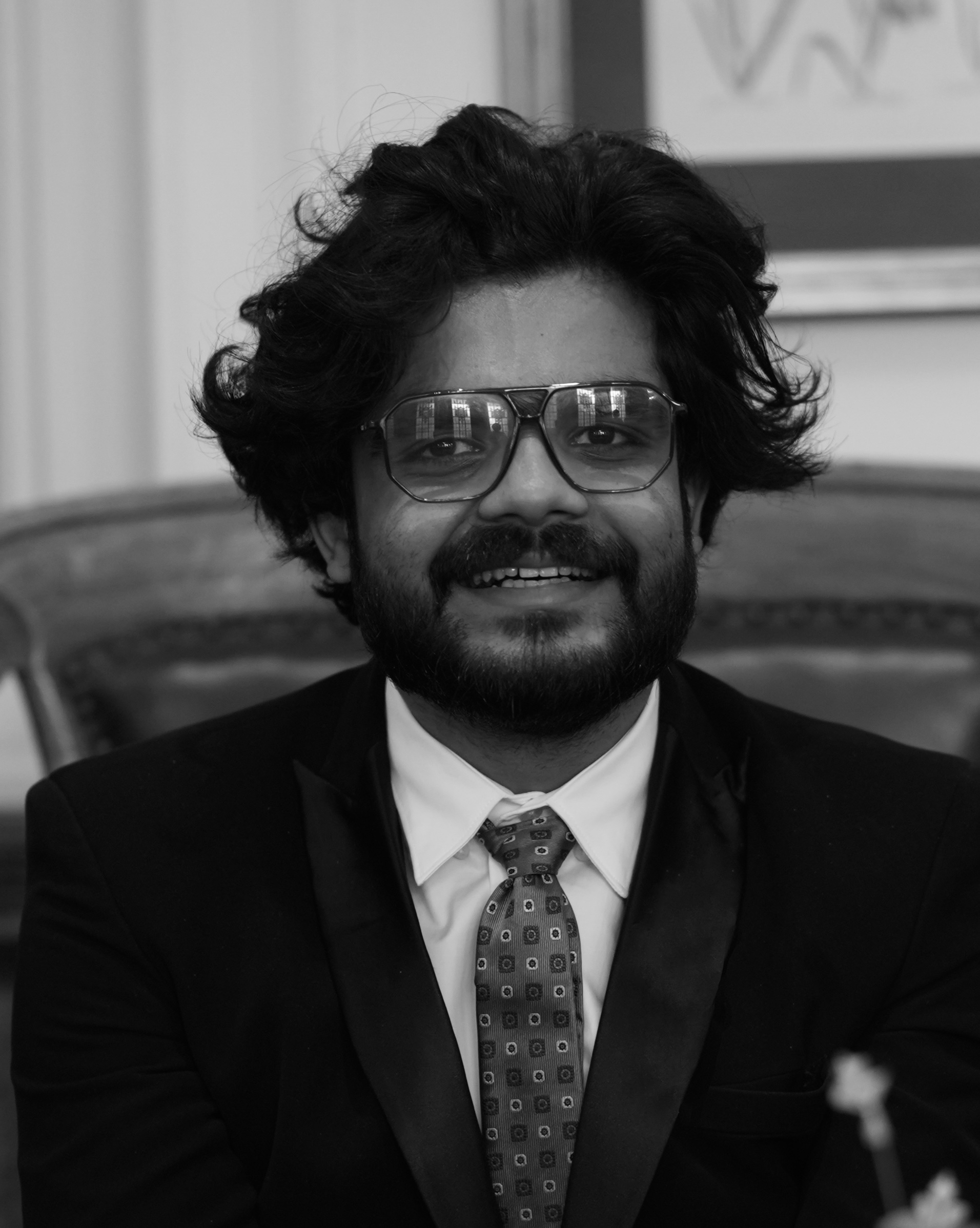
- At London, Oxford in 2023

Background information
- Born: Iritty, Kerala, India
- Genres: Filmi; Indian classical; world music
- Occupations: composer; Instrumentalist; Film director; Writer
- Website: www.blessonthomas.com

Blesson Thomas is an Indian music director, film director, music producer and writer. He has composed music for Malayalam films, advertising films and television commercial jingles in different languages.

He started his music career assisting music directors Tony Joseph Pallivathukal and Jubair Muhammed in Kochi. As a music producer, he has collaborated with several music directors in the South Indian music industry. He made his debut as a film score composer in 2024 with the movie L directed by Shoji Sebastian.

== Early life ==
Blesson Thomas, the youngest son of Thomas P.T. and Mini John, was born in Iritty, located in the Kannur district of Kerala, India.He attended the Government Higher Secondary School in Meenangadi, Wayanad, and earned a bachelor's degree in Music from RLV College of Music and Fine Arts in Thripunithura, Kochi. From a very young age, he received training in Carnatic Music and Piano.

== Career ==
=== Music ===
Blesson Thomas began his career by composing music for television and commercials, amassing nearly a thousand jingles to his credit. The song Pularumbo Thotte from the movie Kundalapuranam, sung by Abhaya Hiranmayi, was a hit. Following this, the song Thattikko Thattare, sung by Sarath Chettan, also captured the hearts of the audience. The song Yaamam from the movie 'L'sung by Najim Arshad was notable

=== Film Direction ===
Blesson expanded his creative endeavors to filmmaking, producing and directing short films on YouTube. His directorial debut, a science fiction short film titled Spyware, won the Best Science Fiction Award at the Alternative Film Festival in Toronto in September 2021, making it the first Indian short film to achieve this accolade. Spyware has also been shortlisted for over 20 international awards. Additionally, he created two prequel short films, Locked in George and Burnt Offering, both of which received significant appreciation from audiences.In 2024, Blesson Thomas directed the short film ‘Thottotte,’ a project celebrated for its unique storytelling and fresh cinematic approach.

=== Films ===
Year	Film	Language	Remarks
2021	Peace	Malayalam	Music Programmer
2020	Vichithram	Malayalam	Music Programmer
2023	Abhyuham	Malayalam	Music Programmer
2024	L	Malayalam	Music Director
2024	Kunddala Puranam	Malayalam	Music Director
2025	Uyirin Uyire	Malayalam	Sound designer
