= Grandmaster (2012 film) =

- Theatrical release poster
- Directed by: B. Unnikrishnan
- Written by: B. Unnikrishnan
- Produced by: Ronnie Screwvala; Siddharth Roy Kapur
- Starring: Mohanlal; Priyamani; Narain; Anoop Menon; Jagathy Sreekumar; Babu Antony; Arjun Nandhakumar
- Cinematography: Vinod Illampally
- Edited by: Manoj
- Music by: Deepak Dev
- Production company: UTV Motion Pictures
- Distributed by: Maxlab Cinemas and Entertainments (Kerala); UTV Motion Pictures (Overseas)
- Release date: 3 May 2012
- Running time: 130 minutes
- Country: India
- Language: Malayalam

Grandmaster is a 2012 Indian Malayalam-language action thriller film written and directed by B. Unnikrishnan and produced by Ronnie Screwvala and Siddharth Roy Kapur under the production company UTV Motion Pictures. The film stars Mohanlal as IG Chandrasekhar, a senior IPS officer who begins investigating a series of murders after receiving an anonymous note. The supporting characters are played by Priyamani, Narain, Anoop Menon, Babu Antony, Jagathy Sreekumar, and Arjun Nandhakumar.

Grandmaster was the debut Malayalam production of UTV Motion Pictures. The film was released on 3 May 2012 to widely positive reviews from critics and was a success at the box office. Grandmaster was released in the online video streaming service Netflix in the United States and Canada, making it the first ever Malayalam film to be released on Netflix. It was also the first Malayalam film to be released with English subtitles outside Kerala. The movie is based on the book The A.B.C Murders by Agatha Christie which was already adapted by Unnikrishnan for the script of a TV series named Black and White.

== Plot ==
Inspector General (IG) Chandrasekhar, a straightforward police officer, is the head of the newly created Metro Crime Stopper Cell in Kochi. He is also a chess master obsessed with the game, to the point where it has become his favourite hobby. Chandrasekhar arrests Jerome, a psychologically troubled man, and rescues the three girls he had kidnapped. But Chandrasekhar's ex-wife Deepthi, a lawyer, manages to get Jerome out of a prison sentence and instead sent to treatment in a psychiatric facility run by her friend Dr. Jacob. It is discovered that the three girls had been insulting and harassing Jerome, which had motivated him to kidnap them.

Chandrasekhar gets a congratulatory note from an anonymous killer who calls himself as "Z," who challenges Chandrasekhar to figure out how he is going to kill his next victims. Chandrasekhar is forced to investigate a string of 3 murders: Alice, a coffee shop owner, Beena Thomson, a famous singer and Chandrika Narayanan, a leading businesswoman. These murders follow a mysterious alphabetical pattern, and each victim has a cross cut onto their forehead. Around the same time, Chandrasekhar's school-aged daughter Dakshayani is preparing for a play under the lead of famous actor Mark Roshan.

Exposition reveals that Chandrasekhar divorced Deepthi ten years earlier, following his discovery that Deepthi was using confidential information from him for professional gain. Deepthi confesses to Chandrasekhar that the three recently murdered women were all involved in the murder of a rich non-resident Indian, Paul Mathew, and made it appear as suicide. Chandrasekhar was the investigating officer in charge of Mathew's murder at the time, when he was the Superintendent. Chandrasekhar realizes that Deepthi is the next target and comes with her to their daughter's play, where they meet a religious fanatic named Victor Rosetti who had been present in all three crime scenes, disguised as a salesman and has been followed Deepthi. The recurring theme of chess is obvious in the game between Chandrasekhar and the Z.

Chandrashekhar understands that there is a mastermind behind Victor Rosetti and decides to play a 'queen's gambit' in his own words. Chandrasekhar finally manages to corner Victor on the rooftop of a theater, and Victor commits suicide by falling off the rooftop to the pavement. Then, Chandrasekhar questions Dr. Jacob and says that he has evidence that he is the killer of the three women and takes him to custody. Dakshayani goes missing and Deepthi goes back to the school to find her. The real serial killer arrives and tries to strangle Deepthi with a red scarf. Fortunately, Chandrasekhar stops him and then finally corners him on the stage. The killer turns out to be none other than Mark himself, who is then revealed by Chandrasekhar to be Paul's younger brother Roshan Mathew. He reveals that he framed Dr. Jacob to mislead Mark and shifted Dakshayani with his colleague Rasheed's help to bring Deepthi alone to Mark.

Mark confesses that he has held a grudge against the women for his brother's death, which Chandrasekhar had already known. Then, Mark also confessed that, disguised as a priest named Father Alexander, he manipulated Victor, who was a schizophrenic patient, into believing that he had committed the murders himself. He had planned for Victor to commit the final murder on Deepthi during the play, but attempted to use the scenery of the fight between Chandrasekhar and Victor to complete his plan. In a last-minute attempt to avenge Paul's death, Mark tries to jump from the stage to murder Deepthi with a dagger, but Chandrasekhar kills him with his gun and saves Deepthi.

The film then ends with Chandrasekhar and Deepthi, along with Dakshayani, finally together again in their house.

== Cast ==
- Mohanlal as IG Chandrasekhar IPS, former SP, a brilliant chessmaster
- Priyamani as Adv. Deepthi Chandrasekhar
- Narain as SP Kishore IPS, Chandrasekhar's subordinate
- Anoop Menon as Dr. Jacob Varghese, A psychiatrist and Deepthi's friend
- Jagathy Sreekumar as CI Rashid, Chandrasekhar's subordinate
- Babu Antony as Victor Rosetti
- Arjun Nandhakumar as "Mark" Roshan Mathew (Z)
- Roma Asrani as Beena Thomson, a playback pop singer
- Siddique as Paul Mathew, Mark's elder brother
- Devan as ADGP Vijayan IPS, Chandrsekhar's superior officer
- Seetha as Chandrika Narayanan
- Riyaz Khan as Jerome Jacob
- Santosh Sleeba as SI Sandeep Menon
- Sreelekshmy V as Dakshayini Chandrasekhar
- Mithra Kurian as Bindya Mathew
- Fathima Babu as Alice
- Rajashree as Police Commissioner Susan, a corrupt and egoistic cop who is Jerome's illegitimate cousin
- Manikuttan as Aby Kuriakose
- Ambika Mohan as Radhika, Chandrasekhar's mother
- Gayathri as Alice, Jerome's mother

== Production ==
Grandmaster is the maiden production of Bollywood production company UTV Motion Pictures in Malayalam cinema. About naming the film Grandmaster, Unnikrishnan said he cannot thinks a better title than Grandmaster, "the whole story is about a grandmaster. He is a great chess enthusiast; he is also a great detective. It is the most appropriate title". For the leading female role of advocate Deepthi, Unnikrishnan approached Andrea Jeremiah, Sonia Agarwal, and Reemma Sen before signing Priyamani. Grandmaster is the first film of Priyamani with Mohanlal. Few years back Priyamani had expressed her desire to act in a film alongside Mohanlal. Deepthi is a criminal lawyer who is separated from her husband Chandrasekhar and in the turn of events, they are forced to work together.

Principal photography began in December 2011 and was carried out primarily at Kochi and Ottapalam.

== Soundtrack ==
Grandmaster

Soundtrack album by Deepak Dev
- Released: 4 April 2012
- Recorded: 2012
- Genre: Feature film soundtrack
- Length: 25:04
- Language: Malayalam
- Label: UTV
- Producer: Deepak Dev

Deepak Dev chronology
Padmasree Bharat Dr. Saroj Kumar (2012)	Grandmaster (2012)	101 Weddings (2012)

The soundtrack of the film was composed by Deepak Dev and consisted six tracks. It was released on 4 April 2012, launched at a function held at People's Plaza, Kochi.

Track listing
No.	Title	Lyrics	Singer(s)	Length
1.	"Akaleyo Nee"	Chitoor Gopi	Vijay Yesudas	4:38
2.	"Aaranu Nee"	Chandra Shekar	Suchithra	4:52
3.	"Doore Engo Nee"	Hari	Sanjeev	4:25
4.	"Aaranu Nee (Club Mix)"	Chandra Shekar	Suchithra	4:14
5.	"My Moment"	Deepak Dev	Krishna Kumar	2:02
6.	"The Grandmaster Theme"		Instrumental
Total length:				25:04

== Release ==
Grandmaster was expected to be released on 27 April 2012, but was postponed. The film was released on 3 May 2012. In Vue, it was released on 29 July 2012. Surya TV purchased the broadcast rights for ₹3.25 crore (US$340,000). Grandmaster was released in the online video streaming service Netflix in the United States and Canada, making it the first ever Malayalam film to be released on Netflix. It was also the first Malayalam film to be released with English subtitles outside Kerala.

== Reception ==
=== Critical reaction ===
Rediff.com rated the film 3.5 out of 5. Sify's critic rated the movie as "watchable" (3.5/5) and said, "Grandmaster easily turns out to be an engaging watch".

=== Accolades ===
Award	Category	Recipient(s)	Result	Ref.
Kerala State Film Award	Best Male Singer	Vijay Yesudas (for "Akaleyo Nee")	Won	
Asianet Film Awards	Best Actor	Mohanlal	Won	
Asiavision Awards	Best Actor	Mohanlal	Won	
South Indian International Movie Awards	Best Debutant Producer	Siddharth Roy Kapur, Ronnie Screwvala	Won	

== Legacy And In Popular Culture ==
Grand Master's Kitchen, a multi-cuisine restaurant opened by director B. Unnikrishnan in 2016 in Palayam, Thiruvananthapuram, was named after the film.
