= Arun Gopan =

- Born: 27 October 1985 (age 40); Kozhikode, Kerala, India
- Genres: Playback singing, Carnatic music, Music director
- Occupations: Singer, Composer
- Instrument: Vocals
- Years active: 2008–present
- Labels: Audiotracs
- Spouse: Nimmy (m. 2013)

Arun Gopan (born 27 October 1985) is an Indian playback singer and music director in the Malayalam, Tamil, Telugu and Kannada film industries. His first film song was "Thathamma" for the movie Kurukshetra in 2008. He has sung more than 50 movie songs. His popular songs include "Maayakkanavu", "Ninnu Kori", "Daivame", "Bhaiyya", "Lalamalamalamalamale", "Piriyukayano" and "Ye Manishike Majiliyo".

== Personal life ==
He married Nimmy in 2013. The couple have a son Aaryan Gopan (born 2021).

== Discography ==
Following is a partial discography:

Year	Film	Song	Language	Notes
2008	Kurukshetra	"Jwalamukhi ...", "Thathamma ..."		
2010	Nallavan	"Maayakkanavu ..."		
2010	Oridathoru Postman	"Ottapettum Kuttapettum ..."		
2011	Kayam	"Devangane ..."		
2011	Aazhakadal	"Kattamaram ..."		
2013	Nellai Pattanam	"Namakkoru Pathai ..."	Tamil Film	
2017	Ninnu Kori	"Once Upon A Time Lo ...", "Ninnu Kori ..."		
2017	Chunkzz	"Hey kili Penne ..."		
2017	Goodalochana	"Daivame ...", "Bhaiyya ...", "Lalamalamalamalamale ...", "Piriyukayano ..."		
2018	Diwanjimoola Grand Prix	"Trissur ..."		
2018	Premasoothram	"Maaram Smarantham ...", "Ninnullil Premam ..."		
2018	Mangalyam Thanthunanena	"Chase Theme ..."		
2018	Amutha	"Mukilea ..."	Tamil Film	Music director
2019	Majili	"Ye Manishike Majiliyo ..."	Telugu Film	
2020	Love FM	"Mullapoo Cholayil ..."		
2020	Pathonpatham Noottandu	"Mayilpeeli Ilakunnu ..."		
2023	Mugajjana Koli		Kannada Film	Music director
