= Najim Arshad =

Indian musical artist (born 1986)

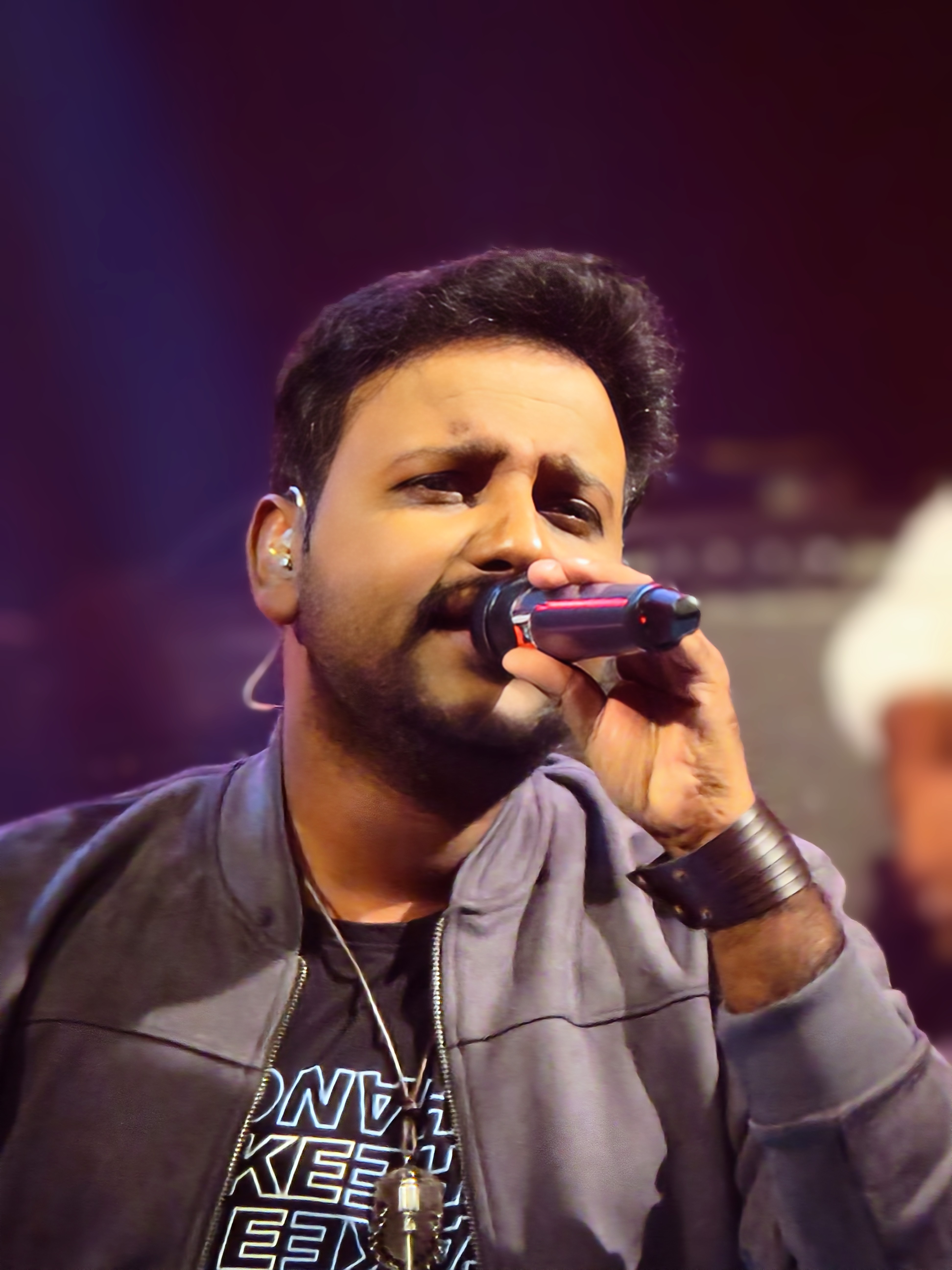

Background information
- Born: 8 June 1986 (age 40); Thiruvananthapuram, Kerala, India
- Genres: Filmi, Melody, Carnatic music
- Occupations: Playback singer; Music director
- Years active: 2007–present

Najim Arshad (born 8 June 1986) is a state award-winning Indian playback singer and music director, sung more than 500 songs in the Malayalam, Tamil, Telugu and Hindi film industries. In 2007, he won the reality show Idea Star Singer. He studied in Swathi Thirunal College of Music and holds graduation and post-graduation degree in music. He was the Rank Holder of University of Kerala in Bachelor Of Performing Arts. He also won the Kalaprathibha title 13 times at the district and sub-district levels during his early school days. He is a recipient of Kerala State Film Award for Best Male Playback Singer.

== Personal life ==
Najim was born to Shahul Hameed (Thirumala Shahul) and Rehma. His father retired from his position as an administrative officer of the Central Vigilance Commission and his mother is a music teacher. He has two elder brothers, Dr. Ajim Shad and Sajim who works as a sound engineer. On 13 September 2015, he married Thazni Thaha (Kiki) in Punalur.

== Career ==
Najim debuted as a playback singer in 2007, with the song "Mizhineer" in Major Ravi's Malayalam film Mission 90 Days. Arshad first gained attention through his album, I'm Here. Najim sang a ghazal for the movie Khaafiron ki Namaaz. He also sang in Diamond Necklace, Casanovva, Doctor Love, Drishyam, Oru Indian Pranayakadha, Jomonte Suvisheshangal, etc. Arshad rose to the top of the music charts in 2012 with the songs Diamond Necklace, Trivandrum Lodge, Ayalum Njanum Thammil and Da Thadiya. He is known for his collaboration with almost all music composers in the Malayalam film industry. He debuted as a music director by composing two Hindi songs in the Mohanlal film 1971 Beyond Borders. The war drama that sheds light onto the Indo-Pak war of 1971, is a multi-lingual film which was also released in Tamil, Telugu and Hindi. Najim has composed the songs Armaan Hazare (singer: Hariharan) and Sarhade (singer: Najim Arshad), that come towards the end portion of the movie. "He received a Kerala State Award for Best Male Playback Singer for the film 'Ketyolanu Ente Malaakha' (Aathmaavile Vaanangalil) in 2019."

== Discography ==
Year	Film	Director	Song	Music director	Other Note(s)
2007	Mission 90 Days	Major Ravi	Mizhineer	Jaison J Nair	Debut film as a Playback Singer
2008	Kurukshetra	Major Ravi	Jwaalamukhi, Thathamma	Siddharth Vipin	
2008	Chembada	Robin Thirumala	Ente Pranayathin, Raavin Viral Thumbinal	Robin Thirumala	
2009	Pattalam	Rohan Krishna	Disayettum	Jassie Gift	
2010	Nalla Pattukare	K.S Sivachandran	Oh Neelambale, Aalaapam	Sharreth	
2010	Ishtam Enikkishtam	NA	En Nenjile Penkonjale	Manomurthy	
2010	Ithu Nammude Katha	Rajesh Kannankara	Pathiye Sandhya Raavil	Sundar	
2011	Note Out	Kutty Naduvil	Neelakuyile...	Vinu Thomas	
2011	Doctor Love	K. Biju	Palappoo Manamayi, Aakasham Doore	Vinu Thomas	
2011	Angane Thudangi	Nandini Reddy	Ammammo Ammo, Kandille Nee Kandille	Jassie Gift	
2012	Casanovva	Rosshan Andrrews	Omanichumma	Gopi Sundar	
2012	Veendum Kannur	Haridas	Nee Vidaparayum	Robin Thirumala	
2012	Diamond Necklace	Lal Jose	Thotte Thotte	Vidyasagar	
2012	Friday	Lijin Jose	Sugandha Neerala	Roby Abraham	
2012	Trivandrum Lodge	V.K Prakash	Kanninullil Nee Kanmani	M. Jayachandran, Bijibal	
2012	Husbands in Goa	Saji Surendran	Mounam Mazhayude	M. G. Sreekumar	
2012	Da Thadiya	Aashiq Abu	Allah Allah	Bijibal	
2012	Ayalum Njanum Thammil	Lal Jose	Thulli Manjinullil	Ouseppachan	
2012	Kochi To Kodambakkam	Venu Pradeep	Daivam Vidhichatho	Thaman	
2012	Idiots	K.S Bava	Muthumani Mazhayay	Nandu Kartha	
2012	Karma Yodha	Major Ravi	Mooliyo	M. G. Sreekumar	
2013	Lisammayude Veedu	Babu Janardhanan	Vellimukil	Vinu Thomas	
2013	Paathiramanal	M Padmakumar	Alolam Thenolum	Afzal Yusuf	
2013	Radio	Umar Muhammed	Thuyilunarunnu	Mohan Sithara	
2013	Red Wine	Salam Bappu	Ilam Veyil Thalodave	Bijibal	
2013	3G Third Generation	Jayaprakash	Azhake Arike	Mohan Sithara	
2013	Immanuel	Lal Jose	Manathudichathu	Afzal Yusuf	
2013	Tourist Home	Shebi	Ariya Maramunde	Muhammed Jesnifer	
2013	Black Ticket	Udayachandran	Thora Ramazha	Gayoz Johnson	
2013	Pullipulikalum Aattinkuttiyum	Lal Jose	Koottimuttiya	Vidyasagar	
2013	Kaanchi	Krishnakumar	Mullappoo	Music Ronie Raphael	
2013	Philips and the Monkey Pen	Rojin and Shanil Muhammad	Kanavukalil	Rahul Subrahmanyan	
2013	Nadan	Kamal	Ethu Sundara Swapna Yavanika	Ousepachan	
2013	Chewing Gum	Praveen M Sukumaran	Akasam	Jonathan Bruce	
2013	Weeping Boy	Felix Joseph	Kilimozhikal	Anand Madhusoodhanan	
2013	Oru Indian Pranayakatha	Sathyan Anthikad	Omanapoove	Vidyasagar	
2013	Drishyam	Jeethu Joseph	Marivil	Music Vinu Thomas	
2014	Pakida	Sunil Karyattukara	Aranara	Bijibal	
2014	Dial 1091	Santo Thattil	Ethrayum, Ilakalum	Syam Dharman	
2014	Snehamulloral Koodeyullappol	Riju Nair	Swapnathinu	Sajeev Mangalathu	
2014	Hang Over	Sreejith Sukumaran	Vellithinkal	Mejo Joseph	
2014	Parankimala	Senan Pallassery	Mazhayil Nirayum	Afzal Yusuf	
2014	Ring Master	Raffi	Aaro Aaro	Gopi Sunder	
2014	Kaafiron Ki Namaaz	Ram Ramesh Sharma	Sawalon Ki	Advait Nemlakar	
2014	To Noora with Love	Babu Narayanan	Oodin Puka	Mohan Sithara	
2014	Law Point	Lijin Jose	Evideyo	Mejo Joseph	
2014	Call Me@	Francis	Araarum	Afzal Yusuf	
2014	Garbhasreeman	Anil Gopinath	Inakkamulla	Ousepachan	
2014	Vikramadithyan	Lal Jose	Mazha Nila	Bijibal	
2014	Bhaiyya Bhaiyya	Johny Antony	Nenjilaara	Vidyasagar	
2014	Rajadhi Raja	Ajai Vaasudev	Kanninu kannin	Karthik Raja	
2014	Vellimoonga	Jibu Jacob	Mavelikku shesham	Bijibal	
2014	Ithihasa	Binu .S	Kannimalare	Deepak Dev	
2014	Paathsaala (Telugu)	Mahi V Raghav	Sooryodayam	Rahul Raj	
2014	Day and Night	Shibu prabhakar	Hridayame	Jinosh Antony	
2014	Mithram	Jespal Shanmukhan	Naanamulla	Latheef	
2014	Mylanchi Monchulla Veedu	Benny thomas	Thammil Thammil	Afzal Yusuf	
2014	8.20	Shyam Mohan	Thoomanjin kulirilo	Alex	
2014	Kaaranavar	Sandhya Rajendran	Madhurikkum ormakale	Ousepachan	
2014	At Once	Syed Usman	Oru Pushpam/ pranayini	Sibu sukumaran	
2014	Ellam Chettante Ishtam Pole	haridas	Nimishangal manjidum	Music Yunaseeyo	
2015	Mariyam Mukku	James Albert	Kavil Apple	Vidyasagar	
2015	Mili	Rajesh Pillai	Manju peyyumee	Gopi Sundar	
2015	Saaradhi	Gopalan Manoj	Mazhamukile	Gopi Sundar	
2015	Namasthe Bali	KV Bijoy	Bahi bu	Gopi Sundar	
2015	White Boyz	Melila Rajashekhar	Vellinool	Ramesh Narayan	
2015	Nellikka	Bijith Bala	Chirakurummi	Bijibal	
2015	Nikkah	Azad Alavil	Kannethathe	Gopi Sundar	
2015	Jilebi	Arun Shekhar	Varikomale	Bijibal	
2015	Laila O Laila	Joshiy	Rathri mulla	Gopi Sundar	
2015	Sir C. P.	Shajoon Karyal	prayam	Sejo John	
2015	Swargathekkal Sundaram	Manoj Aravindakshan	Jeevanil	Rakesh Kesav	
2015	Wonderful Journey	dileep Thomas	Azhake	Sp Varma	
2015	Oru New Generation Pani	Sankar Narayan	Kulirukondu	Karthik Prakash	
2015	32aam Adhyayam 23aam Vakyam	Arjun Prabhakaran & Gokul Ramakrishnan	pathiye novay	Bijibal Gemini Unnikrishnan	
2016	Muttayikallanum Mmmaliyum	Ambujaction Nambiar	Venal kurumbinte	Music Ratheesh Kannan	
2016	Malgudy Days	Vyshakh Sreeekumar	love is falling	Dr Praveen	
2016	Chennai Koottam	Pradeep Madhavan	Pennu pennu	Sajan K. Ram	
2016	Kaattu Maakkaan	Shallil Kallur	Manassinnullil	Murali Guruvayoor	
2016	Ennul Aayiram (TAMIL)	Krishna Kumar	Kaadhal Kolluthadi	Gopi Sundar	
2016	MA CHU KA	Jayan Vannery	Maanasam	Music Gopi Sundar	
2016	Oru Murai Vanth Paarthaya	Saajan K Mathew	Arikil Pathiye	Music Vinu Thomas	
2016	Aadupuliyattam	Kannan Thaamarakkulam	Chilum Chilum Chil	Music Ratheesh Vegha	
2016	Happy Wedding	Omar Lulu	Thenni Thenni	Music Arun Muraleedharan	
2016	Varna Vasathangal	Padmakrishnan	Aarum Ariyathe	Anand Madhusoodanan	
2016	Karinkunnam 6's	Deepu Karunakaran	Medappoo pattum chutti	Rahul Raj	
2016	Oppam	Priyadarshan	Palanaalaay		
2016	Mudmaza	Jeyin Raj	Ee malarvaadiyi	Mohan Sithara	
2016	Swarnakaduva	Jose Thomas	Mailanchi medu vaaazhum	Ratheesh Vegha	
2016	Kattappanayile Hrithik Roshan	Nadirsha	Azhake azhake	Nadirsha	
2016	Gemini	Baburaj	Jeevitham ithu	Shaan Rahman	
2016	Jomonte Suvisheshangal	Sathyan Anthikad	Neelakaasam	Vidyasagar	
2016	Fukri	Sidhique	Konji va Kanmani	Sudheep Elayidom	
2017	1971 Beyond Borders	Major Ravi	Sarhade ]]	Najim Arshad	
2017	Engeyum Naniruppen	Benny Thomas	Vinnulaga & Knavukal	Afzal Yusuf	
2017	Achayans	Kannan Thamarakkulam	Kaana Chirakutharoo	Ratheesh Vegha	
2017	Viswa Vikhyatharaya Payyanmar	Rajesh Kannankara	Ni en nenjil	Arun Ram	
2017	Role Models	Raffi	Theru There	Gopi Sundar	
2017	Matchbox	Sivaram Mony	Orayiram	Bijibal	
2017	Sherlock Toms	Shafi (director)	Eeswarante pambaram	Bijibal	
2017	History Of Joy	Vishnu Govindan	Maari Peyyuna	Jovey George Sujo	
2017	Meezan	Jabbar Chemmadu	En Khalbile	4musics	
2017	Chembarathi poovu	Arun Vaiga	Aaro	Raakesh	
2017	Deadline	Krishnajith s Vijayan	Chilambitta	Nikhil Prabha	
2017	Vimaanam	Pradeep M Nair	Vaaniluyare	Gopi Sundar	
2018	Aadhi	Jithu Joseph	Sooryane, Mizhiyoram & Piriyum	Anil Johnson	
2018	kalyanam	Rajesh Nair	Mazhamukile	Prakash Alex	
2018	Theneechayum Peerankippadayum	Haridas	Irumizhiyil	Thej Mervin	
2018	Khaleefa	Mubi Huque	Mekhamaala & Allahu allahu	DeviKrishna	
2018	Pranayatheertham	Dinu Gopal	Kandittumenthe	Ambalappuzha Vijayan	
2018	Angane Njanum Premichu	Rajiv Varghese	Snehithano	Hesham Abdul Wahab	
2018	nalla vishesham	ajithan	nin mizhiyil & nin snehamennumen	Rex Isaacs	
2018	Ente Ummante Peru	Jose Sebastian	Sancharamay Sancharamay	Gopi Sundar	
2019	Neeyum Njanum	A. K. Sajan	Ishq Kondu	Vinu Thomas	
2019	Irupathiyonnaam Noottaandu	Arun Gopy	indindarangal	Gopi Sunder	
2019	Gramavasis	BN Shajeer sha	Oru Pakal	Prince Rex, Sooraj S Nair	
2019	Kalikoottukar	pK Baaburaj	neeyoral	Vinu Thomas	
2019	Mr. & Ms. Rowdy	Jeethu Joseph	puthiya vazhi	Arun Vijay	
2019	Rakshapurushan	Coral Reef Productions	Pranayam En Kanavil	Jibin George Sebastian	
2019	Prakashante Metro	Haseena Suneer	Mazhamukiletho	Rahul Subrahmanyan	
2019	Oru Yamandan Premakadha	BC Noufal	Kanno Nilakaayal	Nadirsha	
2019	Childrens Park	Shafi (director)	Enthoram Enthoram	Arun Raj	
2019	My Great Grandfather	Aneesh Anwar	kannil kannil	Music Vishnu Mohan Sithara	
2019	Ittymaani: Made in China	Jiby Joju	Vennilavu	Kailasmenon	
2019	Thureeyam	Jithin Kumbukaatu	Virunnu Vannu Maadhavam	Sibu Sukumaaran	
2019	Pranayameenukalude Kadal	Kamal	Neelime Neelime	Shaan Rahman	
2019	Adhyarathri	Jibu Jacob	Onavillane	Bijibal	
2019	Aakasha Ganga 2	Vinayan	Aaru Thannuvo	Bijibal	
2019	Kettyolanu Ente Malaakha	Nisam Basheer	Aathmaavile	William Francis	
2020	kuttiyappanum Daivadootharum	Gokul Hariharan	Anthimaanam	Adarsh PV	
2020	Thallumpidi	Prajin Prathap	Neeharam	Sumesh Parameswar	
2020	Dhamaka	Omar Lulu	ee Ventheeram & Vazhikattum	Gopi Sundar	
2020	Nishabdham	Hemant Madhukar	Madhuramithe	Gopi Sundar	
2021	Guardian	Satheesh Paul	Savariya	Pradeep Tom	
2021	Udumbu	Kannan Thamarakkulam	Mrigamadamode	saanand George	
2021	Vaanku	Kavya Prakash	Malayudemukalil	Ousepachan	
2021	Priyatham	Anand Daiv	oro udayavum	sajeev mangalath	
2021	Kristeena	Sudharsanan Russelpuram	Venmeghame	Srinath S Vijay	
2021	Ammachikoottile Pranayam	Rasheed Palluruthy	puthan manavaalan	Ninoy Varghese	
2022	Lalitham Sundaram	Madhu Warrier	Meghajaalakam	Bijibal	
2022	Four	Sunil Haneef	Manju Thullikal	Bijibal	
2022	Origami	Binoy Pattimattom	Kathoram	Suresh Nandan	
2022	John Luther	Abhijith Joseph	Oru Nalithaa	Shaan Rahman	
2022	Kuri	KR Praveen	Angu Mele	Vinu Thomas	
2022	Vibaha Avahanam	Sajaan Alummoottil	Neelakasham pole	Vinu Thomas	
2022	Thattassery Koottam	Anoop Padmanabhan	Maya Mathilukal	Raam Sarath	
2022	Paaykappal	Mohammed Rafi	Kachanam Kaattadiche	Music Mohammed Rafi	
2022	Four Years	Ranjith Sankar	paranne pokunne	Sankar Sarma	
2022	Origami	Binoy pattimattom	Kathoram Amma	Music Suresh Nandan	
2022	Shefeekinte Santhosham	Anup Pandalam	Vaanambadi	Shaan Rahman	
2022	Kaipola	KG Shyju	Kayyanju Kalam	Mejo Joseph	
2023	Thankam	Saheed Arafath	Devi Neeye	Bijibal	
2023	Flush	Aisha Sulthana	Thenni Thenni	William Francis	
2023	Pendulam	Rejin S. Babu	Roohin Nizhale	Jean P. Johnson	
2023	Love	RP Bala	Kodayin	Ronnie Rapheal	
2023	Mr Hacker	Haris	Chankinu Chanke	Sumesh Koottikkal	
2023	praavu	Navaz Ali	Thaarakam	Bijibal	
2023	Zha	Gireesh PC Palam	thalam thulli	Rajesh Babu	
2023	Rani	Nizamudeen Nazar	Kannil Kannil	Rahul Raj Thottathil	
2023	L	Shoji Sebastian	Yaamam	Blesson Thomas	
2023	thaal	Rajasaagar	Kaattu padunnoree	Bijibal	
2023	Vaasam	Charles	Hridayame	Viswajith	
2023	Adiyantharavastha kaalathe pranayam	Alappy Ashraf	pranayathin Poole	Ts Jayaraj	
2023	Anuragam	Shahad Nilambur	Oru Nooru ninavukal	Joel Johns	
2023	Abhyooham	Akhil Sreenivas	Poomandaram	Jubair Muhammed	
2023	Praavu	Navaz Ali	Thaarakam	Bijibal	
2024	Hi Nanna (malayalam & Kannada )	Arun Alat, Kaviraj	Ithale nee & Allondu	Hesham Abdul Wahab	
2024	Perunkaliyattam	Sunil K Tilak	Poove Poove	Satheesh Bhadra	
2024	Behindd	Amhan Raphy	parayathe	Arif Ansar	
2024	Palayam PC	VM Anil	Snehatheeram	Sadik Pandallur	
2024	Kuruvipaappa	Joshy John	Sanchaari	Pradeep Tom	
2024	Vishnu Priya(Kannada)	VK Prakash	Chiguru Chiguru	Gopi Sundar	
2024	Secret Home	Abhayakumar	Pathiye Thoduvan	Sankar Sharma	
2024	Kundala Puranam	Santhosh Puthukkunn	Mayathen Tharame	Blesson Thomas	
2024	Adios Amigos	Nahas Nazar	Iniyum veruthe	Jakes Bejoy	
2024	Saripodhaa Sanivaaram - (D)	Vivek Athreya	"Sa Ri Ma Pa"	Jakes Bejoy	
2024	Cup	Sanju Samuel	Chirimalarukale	Shaan Rahman	
2024	Oshana	N.V.Manoj	Nee Pathiye Moolum	Mejo Joseph	
2025	Machante Maalakha	Boban Samuel	Arikil etho novin	ousepachan	
2025	Aathmasaho	Gopukiran Sadasivan	Chellacheru	Ronnie Rapheal	
2025	Kannappa	Mukhesh Kumar Singh	Irumey Chernnoru	Stephen Devassy	
2025	Koodal	Shanu Kakkoor & Shefi Eppikadu	Kanne ninne kande	Sumesh Raveendran	
2025	SoothraVakyam	Eugien Jos Chiramel	doore vanathiril	Jean p Johnson	
2025	Odiyankam	Sunil Subrahmanyan	Venal Maayave	Rijosh	
2025	Mirage	Jeethu Joseph	Ilavenal poove	Vishnu Syam	
2026	Magic Moments	Rajeev Neduvanadu	akaasham mele	p j	
2026	Karimbadam	Amladh Jaleel	Vannu nee	Anaz Sainudheen	

=== Music Director ===
Year	Film	Director	Song	Other Note(s)
2017	1971 Beyond Borders	Major Ravi	Armaan Hazare	Singer: Hariharan
2017	1971 Beyond Borders	Major Ravi	Sarhade	Singer: Najim Arshad

=== Albums ===
Year	Language	Album	Song	Music	Lyrics
2011	Malayalam	Meghamalhar	Malharile Venmeghame	Damodar Narayanan	Adarsh
2011	Tamil	Mannippaaya En Aasau	Mannippaaya	Narayanan R Menon	Narayanan R Menon
2012	Tamil	I'm Here	Idhayanila	Haarith Shahzad	Dr Rajesh Thirumala
2014	Malayalam	Olangalkkumappuram	Thaalathiladum	Akhil S Kiran	Mahesh Gopal
2015	Malayalam	Mi Adhyathe Love	Manjupoloru Pennu	Aswin Jose	Aswin Jose
2015	Tamil	Anbe En kadhal	anbe ni asai	Najim Arshad	Dr Rajesh thirumala
2016	Malayalam	Christmas Tharakam	Pookal Pole	Najim Arshad & Anju Joseph	Joice Samuel
2017	Malayalam	Madhumozhi	Madhumozhi	Appu John	Joe Paul
2018	Malayalam	Joanna	En Manassil	liJO Mathew	Linku Abraham
2018	Malayalam	Olathil Thalathil	Olathil Thalathil	Josy Alappuzha	Beeyar Prasad
2019	Malayalam	Ni En Sakhi	Aararo Neeyaro	Joice Samuel	Najim Arshad
2020	Malayalam	Vaaka	May maasa poove	Clement Kalathiparambil	Dhanya Gautham
2021	Malayalam	Himabindu	Himabindupozhiyum	Thirumala Shahul	Dr Ajim Shad
2021	Malayalam	Aardhram	Pranayathen Mazhayil	Narayanan R Menon	Narayanan R Menon, Rajesh Athikkayam
2021	Malayalam	Ya Rabb	Ya rabbil Alameene	Thirumala Shahul	Vadassery khader & Dr Ajim Shad
2021	Malayalam	Kanne Kanmaniye	Kanne Kanmaniye	Najim Arshad	Arun Alat
2022	Malayalam	Theeram	Oru theeram	Najim Arshad	Harinarayanan
2022	Malayalam	Kannale Nee	Kannale Neeyen	Najim Arshad	Arun Alat
2022	Malayalam	Nee pokathe	Nee pokathe	Najim Arshad	Arun Alat
2022	Malayalam	En Onathumbi	En Onathumbi	Narayanan R Menon	Narayanan R Menon
2023	Tamil	Mazhai pol	Mazhai pola	Najim Arshad	Dr Rajesh Thirumala
2023	Malayalam	Karineela Kannullolu	Karineela	Anchu Kasaragod	Anchu Kasaragod
2023	Malayalam	Jaathi poothaRavil	Jathipootha	Najim Arshad	Suhail Sulthan
2023	Malayalam	Mayamayooram	Mayamayooram	Najim Arshad	Suhail Sulthan
2024	Malayalam	kanne kanne mallipoove	kanne kanne	Najim Arshad	Suhail Sulthan
2024	Malayalam	Mukil Pole	Melle Melle	Najim Arshad	Suhail Sulthan

== Awards ==
- 2023 : Poovachal Khader Film Awards 2023 - Best Singer
- 2022 : Gandhi Bhavan Award - Best Singer
- 2020 : Kerala State Film Award for Best Male Playback Singer
- 2016 : Indywood Excellence Award ||Popular Singer (Note: "Indywood Award"||url=http://expressnews.asia/tap-global-market-for-music-sohan-roy-tells-indian-film-industry/|)
- 2015 : Ramu Karyattu Award || Best Male Singer
- 2015 : Mangalam Publications Film Awards || Best Male singer
- 2015 : EFA Award || Voice of the year
- 2014 : Asiavision Awards || Sensational Singer
- 2014 : Cera Big Malayalam music awards (92.7 BIG FM)
- 2013 : Amrita TV Film Awards || Best Male Singer
- 2013 : Mollywood Nakshathra Best Male Singer
- 2013 : Gulf Malayalam Music Award
- 2013 : Lions Club Best Singer Awards 2013
- 2013 : Kerala Film Critics Association Awards – Best Male Singer – Drishyam, Emmanuel
- 2013 : Thikkurushi Foundation award best male singer
- 2008 : Vayyankara Madhusoodanan Award
