= Keerthi Chakra (film) =

- Theatrical release poster
- Directed by: Major Ravi
- Written by: Major Ravi
- Produced by: R. B. Choudary
- Starring: Mohanlal; Jiiva; Biju Menon; Gopika; Lakshmi Gopalaswamy; Nawab Shah; Shammi Thilakan
- Cinematography: Tirru
- Edited by: V. Jaishankar
- Music by: Songs: Joshua Sridhar; Background Score: C. Rajamani
- Production company: Super Good Films
- Distributed by: Super Good Films
- Release date: 4 August 2006
- Running time: 144 minutes
- Country: India
- Language: Malayalam

Keerthi Chakra is a 2006 Indian Malayalam-language war film written and directed by Major Ravi. The film stars Mohanlal in lead role as Major Mahadevan and also features Jiiva, Biju Menon, Gopika, Lakshmi Gopalaswamy and Nawab Shah in supporting roles. This film marks the debut of Jiiva in Malayalam cinema. The film is based on true events related to incidents that took place in Jammu and Kashmir. The film is the first in the Major Mahadevan film series. The title is derived from the Indian gallantry award, Kirti Chakra.

The film was released worldwide on 4 August 2006. It was critically and commercial well received. It was the third highest-grossing Malayalam film of the year. The film was dubbed released into Tamil titled Aran, with a few additional scenes shot and added for Prakash Raj. Major Ravi won the Kerala State Film Award for Best Screenplay for the film.

== Plot ==
Major Mahadevan is an Indian Army officer deputed to the National Security Guards (NSG). His native place is in Kerala. He has been assigned to counter-terrorism duties in Kashmir and commands an elite group of NSG commandos. He is always supported and encouraged by his superior officer, Colonel Ravi Dutta who is an honest officer. He calls back his buddy Havildar Jaikumar from his honeymoon because he has information about major activities of the militants; he feels Jai is needed for the team. Jai's native place is in Tamil Nadu. The commandos raid a mosque in civilian dress and seize a big collection of arms and explosives. Havildar Jai's wife Sandhya informs him over telephone, that she is pregnant with his child.

Later, during an operation focused on some cottages near the Dal Lake, a commando Kishori Lal in the team is killed and an outraged Jai shoots down a captured terrorist who challenges the commandos. Athira, a human rights activist learns about this and threatens to file a complaint with the government. She later understands the situation and the sincerity of the commandos and decides not to proceed with the complaint.

Meanwhile, a group of terrorists from Afghanistan and Pakistan conspire to hit the Hazratbal Shrine with a missile as they think this will create unrest in the region and that the Indian army will be blamed. They hijack a house that offers a good vantage point on the shrine and plants the missile there. Some of them rape a girl in the house in front of her family and shoot a boy who protests. A military patrolling vehicle hears the gunshot; as they approach the house, they are fired upon. The patrolling team intimates the NSG, and Mahadevan and his team immediately join the battle.

After a long operation, the team kills the terrorists, frees the civilian hostages and disarms the missile. But a civilian informs that one more terrorist is not to be seen among the corpses, and the commandos goes to find him in the house. They locate the terrorist, who is the leader and Mahadevan recognises him as the same perosn who killed his wife Sreekutty and daughter. Mahadevan overpowers and subdues him. The terrorist tries to shoot Mahadevan, but Jai covers him, who gets hit by the bullet and dies. The terrorist gets killed by the commandos and Jai is awarded the Kirti Chakra posthumously. Later, Sandhya gives birth to his son. She visits Jai's grave, along with his son.

== Cast ==
- Mohanlal as Major Mahadevan (Mahi), NSG officer
- Jiiva as Havildar Jaikumar, NSG Commando
- Biju Menon as Gopinath, CRPF officer
- Shammi Thilakan as Captain Hari, NSG Commando
- Sai Kumar as Colonel Ravi Dutta, NSG officer, Mahi's superior officer
- Gopika as Sandhya, Jai's wife
- Lakshmi Gopalaswamy as Sreekutty, Mahadevan's wife
- Shweta Menon as Athira, Human Rights Activist
- Nawab Shah as Terrorist leader
- Santhosh Jogi as Havildar Kishori Lal, NSG Commando
- Cochin Hanifa as Nairettan, Tea shop owner
- Baiju Ezhupunna as Siddharthan, NSG Commando
- Spadikam George as Colonel Krishnakumar, a corrupt and dishonest officer
- Ganja Karuppu as Ganja Karuppu, Jai's friend
- Delhi Ganesh as Jai's father
- Paravai Muniyamma as Paati (Grandma)
- Ramesh Khanna as a soldier
- Payal Malhotra as Kashmiri
- Sanusha as Kashmiri girl
- Kannan Pattambi as Appukuttan, Tea boy
- Kiran Raj as Terrorist

== Production ==
Major Ravi, a retired officer of the Indian army, planned a film on Kashmir militancy based on real-life incidents while he was under duty in counter-terrorism activities in Punjab & Kashmir. He wrote the film which reveals the actual mode of working of Islamic terrorist groups within India: their recruitment, training, target choosing, terror strikes, propaganda, and how Indian armed forces tackle the attacks via its special services forces. The movie develops with this backdrop and tries to convey the dedication and selfless service defence personnel exhibit while on duty.

Ravi got R. B. Chaudhary of Super Good Films, a major production house in Tamil Nadu, to produce the film. The film was re-shot and released Tamil as well. Chaudhary's son Jiiva was cast in a major role in the film. A few additional scenes were shot for the Tamil version, Aran. The filming was predominantly done in Srinagar and Pollachi.

== Soundtrack ==
The soundtrack has songs composed by Joshua Sridhar and Sajid-Farhad, penned by Gireesh Puthenchery, Sajid-Farhad and Pa. Vijay

Keerthichakra

Soundtrack album by Joshua Sridhar and Sajid-Farhad
- Released: 3 July 2006
- Studio: AM
- Genre: Film soundtrack
- Language: Malayalam
- Label: Johny Sagariga

=== Original tracklist ===
No.	Title	Singer(s)	Lyricist	Composer
1	"Kaveri Nadiye"	Karthik, Asha G. Menon	Gireesh Puthenchery	Joshua Sridhar
2	"Mukile Mukile"	M. G. Sreekumar	Gireesh Puthenchery	Joshua Sridhar
3	"Thottaal Poo"	Anushka Manchanda, Chorus	Pa. Vijay	Joshua Sridhar
4	"Ghanashyama"	M. G. Sreekumar	Gireesh Puthenchery	Joshua Sridhar
5	"Khuda Se Mannath"	Kailash Kher	Sajid-Farhad	Sajid-Farhad
6	"Pooncholai Kiliye"	Karthik, Asha G. Menon	Pa. Vijay	Joshua Sridhar
7	"Giddy Up Giddy Up Brave Prince"	Pete Hillier	Gireesh Puthencherry	Joshua Sridhar

=== Tamil tracklist ===
No.	Title	Singer(s)	Lyricist	Composer
1	"Allahve Engalin"	Manikka Vinayagam, Sajid Farth	Na.Muthukumar	Joshua Sridhar
2	"Pooncholai"	Karthik,Ashamenaon	Sivanthi K. Selvarasan	Joshua Sridhar
3	"Idhu Yarum"	Srinivas	Na.Muthukumar	Joshua Sridhar
4	"Mugilae Mugilae"	Srinivas	Na.Muthukumar	Joshua Sridhar
5	"Thottal Poo Pookkudhey"	Anushka	Pa.Vijay	Joshua Sridhar

== Release ==
The film was released on 4 August 2006.

=== Critical reaction ===
Keerthi Chakra received generally positive reviews. The Rediff.com reviewer describes the casting of Mohanlal as "near perfect" and comments, "though people may complain that his bulky physique doesn't suit the role of a commando… Mohanlal overcomes this shortcoming by the agility and the emotional roundness he gives to his character." He also thought Major Ravi was "successful in keeping the feel of the film authentic most of the time." On the negative side, he found that "there are certain times when the narrative lapses into the stereotypical terrain." He also thought the film "lacks in pace" and that "except for the main characters; the others are cardboardish." The reviewer wraps up his review by commenting that "the effort that went behind making Kirtichakra is commendable."

Indiaglitz.com review calls the film one that parallels national standards. The reviewer goes on to state that "proving to be an effective story teller and a crafty film maker, the film and the director holds the viewers till the end with very little short comings." The major actors and the cinematographer were also praised. The reviewer did not find too many negative points about the film and described it as a "technically sound, visually striking flick largely based on reality."

=== Box office ===
Kirti Chakra performed well at the box office, becoming the third highest-grossing Malayalam film of the year (behind Classmates and Rasathanthram). The film also had a great opening. However, Aran - the Tamil version, which had additional footage of Prakash Raj, Jeeva, Santhana Bharathi, Delhi Ganesh, Paravai Muniyamma, and Cochin Haneefa; comedy tracks with Ramesh Khanna, Ganja Karuppu; and song montages featuring Jeeva and Gopika, was not well received, with the additional scenes being lamented as the reason. Mohanlal disowned Aran since his voice had been dubbed by another artist, Rajeev, without his consent.

=== Satellite rights ===
The satellite right of the original movie was acquired by Asianet while the rights for Tamil dubbed version Aran was obtained by Kalaignar TV.

== Sequels and prequel ==
The film spawned two sequels—Kurukshetra (2008), Kandahar (2010) and one prequel 1971: Beyond Borders (2017)—directed by Major Ravi and Mohanlal reprising his role with new supporting cast in each film. While Kurukshetra was a commercial success at the box office, the other two was not that well received critically and commercially.
