= Kurukshetra (2008 film) =

- Theatrical release poster
- Directed by: Major Ravi
- Written by: Major Ravi
- Produced by: Santhosh Damodharan
- Starring: Mohanlal; Siddique; Biju Menon; Ravi Mariya; Sania Singh; Anjana Chandran; Assim Jamal
- Cinematography: Loganathan Srinivasan
- Edited by: V. Jaisankar
- Music by: Siddharth Vipin
- Production company: Damor Cinema
- Distributed by: Damor Cinema Release
- Release date: 28 October 2008
- Running time: 125 minutes
- Country: India
- Language: Malayalam

Kurukshetra is a 2008 Indian Malayalam language war film written and directed by Major Ravi. It is a sequel to the 2006 film Keerthi Chakra and the second installment in the Major Mahadevan film series, with Mohanlal reprising his role as Colonel Mahadevan The film is based on the Kargil conflict of 1999 between India and Pakistan. The political situation of the conflict is portrayed from an Indian perspective.

The film was released on October 28 coinciding with Diwali. It was a box office success and was one of the highest-grossing Malayalam films of the year. The third film in the series, Kandahar, was released in 2010 and the fourth, 1971: Beyond Borders, in 2017.

== Plot ==
The story revolves around the 1999 Kargil War between India and Pakistan. It revolves around the Battle of Tololing between Indian Army Colonel Mahadevan and Pakistani Army Colonel Chengiz. In the climax, India wins the war and Mahadevan kills Chengiz and avenges the brutal murder of many Indian soldiers.

== Cast ==
- Mohanlal as Colonel Mahadevan, CO- 2 JAT
- Siddique as Subedar Major Ahmed Khan, 2 JAT
- Biju Menon as Major Rajesh, 2 JAT
- Shrysh Zutshi as Umer Chengis, Pakistani Army Colonel
- Ravi Mariya as Brigadier Krishna, 2 JAT
- Sania Singh as Captain Lekshmi Rajesh, army doctor
- Manikuttan as Naik Prakash Menon
- Pradeep Chandran as Naik Saravanan, Radio Operator
- Rony David as Naik Sasi
- Saju Attingal as Naik Swaminathan
- Sudheer Sukumaran as Havildar Johnson Varghese
- Anu Anand as Lieutenant Saurabh Kalia
- Major Kishore as Major Jerry Prem Raj
- Sanu Salim as Captain Vikram Batra
- Kannan Pattambi as Naik Kannan, Cook
- Anil as Naik Anilkumar
- Cochin Haneefa as Havildar Sathyan
- Bineesh Kodiyeri as Naik Bineesh
- Suraj Venjaramoodu as Naik Ganeshan
- Anjana Chandran as Alma, Kashmiri Girl
- Anil Murali as Squadron Leader Ajay (Indian Air Force officer)
- Joy John Antony as Soldier
- Assim Jamal as Hyder, Pakistani officer
- Sukumari as Fussy's mother (Cameo appearance)
- Kavitha Nair as Swaminathan's wife
- Major Ravi (Cameo appearance)
- Asrani (Cameo appearance)

== Soundtrack ==
Kurukshetra

Soundtrack album by Siddharth Vipin
- Released: 2008
- Genre: Popular music
- Language: Malayalam
- Label: Manorama Music
- Producer: Santhosh Damodar

Siddharth Vipin chronology
Kurukshetra (2008)	Currency (2009)

The film has four songs composed by debutant Siddharth Vipin, with lyrics by Gireesh Puthenchery and Bombay S. Kamal (Chalo Chalo).

Track	Song title	Singer(s)
1	"Jwalamukhi"	Najim Arshad, Arun Gopan, Roshan, Nithin Raj
2	"Oru Yathramozhiyode"	M. G. Sreekumar, Swetha
3	"Thathamma"	Najim Arshad, Arun Gopan, Roshan, Nithin Raj
4	"Chalo Chalo Jawan"	Kailash Kher
5	"Oru Yathramozhiyode"	Swetha
6	"Jwalamukhi"	Instrumental

== Accolades ==
Kerala Film Critics Association Awards

- Second Best Film
- Best Actor – Mohanlal
- Best Editor - V. Jaisankar

== See also ==
- Kargil War
