= Kandahar (2010 film) =

- Theatrical release poster
- Directed by: Major Ravi
- Written by: Major Ravi
- Produced by: Sunil C. Nair; Mohanlal
- Starring: Mohanlal; Amitabh Bachchan; Ganesh Venkatraman; Ragini Dwivedi; Sumalatha; Ananya; Vijesh Rana
- Cinematography: Ravi Varman; Velraj
- Edited by: Don Max
- Music by: Shamir Tandon; Vivek V. K.
- Production companies: Zoe Estebe Moviez; Pranavam Arts International
- Distributed by: Maxlab Cinemas and Entertainments
- Release date: 16 December 2010
- Running time: 142 minutes
- Country: India
- Language: Malayalam

Kandahar is a 2010 Indian Malayalam-language war film written and directed by Major Ravi. It is the third installment in the Major Mahadevan film series, with Mohanlal reprising his role as Major Mahadevan after the 2006 film Keerthi Chakra and 2008 film Kurukshetra. The film also stars Amitabh Bachchan and Ganesh Venkatraman in their Malayalam debuts.

The film follows the fictional character Major Mahadevan and his unit undertake a mission to deal with an international terrorist organisation after a group of hardcore terrorists hijack a plane. The plot is based on the hijacking of the Indian Airlines Flight 814 in 1999. The political situation is portrayed from an Indian perspective in the film. Kandahar was released on 16 December 2010, along with its dubbed versions in Tamil and Hindi languages.

The film's sound design was done by Baylon Fonseca. Kandahar was co-produced by Sunil Nair and Mohanlal. It was marketed online by Shaz Shabeer Strikers and Crew Kochi. The film, unlike the prequels, received mixed reviews.

== Plot ==
Suryanatha Sharma (Ganesh Venkatraman) is an educated, unemployed man. His father, Lokanatha Sharma (played by Amitabh Bachchan), wants to see his son succeed in life. Things change when he meets Major Mahadevan (Mohanlal). Though, their initial encounter is hostile at first, Suryanath apologizes to Mahadevan for his rudeness, and impressed with Suryanath and seeing potential in him, he suggests him to join the Indian Army. Though he struggles a bit in the beginning, Suryanath is able to pass out of the Indian Military Academy with flying colors' and gets commissioned in the Indian Army

After getting Commissioned, he joins the NSG (National Security Guard) as a commando where he joins Mahadevan's crew. Soon after, an Air India flight becomes hijacked by hardcore terrorists whose objective was to have the Indian government release their leader who was caught by Mahadevan himself. They are then forced to land in New Delhi to refuel. Mahadevan and his crew are able to infiltrate the plane through the wheels, even though their superior ordered them not to.

Once inside the plane they are able to find out the number of terrorists who are inside and quickly kill them and their leader and retake the plane. However a sleeper cell reveals himself and shoot the pilots and Suryanath injuring them. Mahadevan and Suryanath take control of the plane and with the pilot's guidance are able to land plane. But Suryanath unfortunately dies from his injuries. He is given a hero's funeral with honour after which Mahadevan consoles Lokanath, who reveals that he is proud of his son and thanks Major Mahadevan for making his son a hero.

== Cast ==
- Mohanlal as Major Mahadevan, from Jat Regiment attached to NSG
- Amitabh Bachchan as Lokanatha Sharma
- Ganesh Venkatraman as Captain Suryanatha Sharma, NSG officer
- Ragini Dwivedi as Aishwarya, Surya's fiancé
- Sumalatha as Sumangaly, wife of Lokanatha Sharma
- Ananya as a student
- Major Ravi as Havildar Major Shiva
- K. P. A. C. Lalitha as Pathumma
- Mamukkoya as Mullah
- N. L. Balakrishnan as Ballston
- Joemon Joshy as Cadet Kishore
- Major Kishore as NSG Commando Nair
- Naveen Arakkal as Naveen, NSG Commando
- Suresh Nair as Cadet
- Saju Attingal as NSG Commando
- Renjith Reghu
- Anoop Chandran as Selvan
- Pradeep Chandran as Senior Officer
- Jaffar Idukki as Mani
- S.P.Sreekumar as Cadet
- Kannan Pattambi
- Shrikant Kamat
- Soorya J Menon
- Nawab Shah as Cadet Instructor
- Ragasya
- Vijesh Rana (Indian Model and Producer)as Sleeping Terrorist

== Production ==
=== Development ===
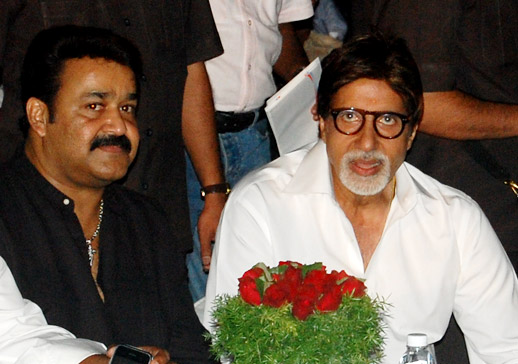
Mohanlal with Amitabh Bachchan

Kandahar is the third film in the "Major Mahadevan series", the previous ones being Keerthichakra (2006) and Kurukshetra (2008). Jeeva played a supporting role in Kirtichakra and Siddique in Kurukshetra. This time Ganesh Venkatraman is playing the supporting role.

=== Casting ===
Mohanlal plays the lead role and is the film's producer. Amitabh Bachchan was approached for a major role in the film, and he immediately agreed. Even though he did not ask for any remuneration for his appearance, he was offered ₹8 crores. His son in Kandahar is played by Ganesh Venkatraman. Later, model and Kannada actress, Ragini Dwivedi was signed up to play a supporting role. There were reports that Parvathy Omanakuttan was also cast in the film.

=== Filming ===
At a press conference, Major Ravi reported that the aeroplane sequences of the film would be shot in Russia. Other locations include Ooty and New Delhi.

== Soundtrack ==
Kandahar

Soundtrack album by Shamir Tandon
- Released: 27 November 2010
- Genre: Film soundtrack
- Language: Malayalam
- Label: Satyam Audios
- Producers: Sunil C. Nair; Mohanlal

The soundtrack features five songs composed by Shamir Tandon, who is known for his compositions in Madhur Bhandarkar's films, with lyrics by Sandeep Nath, Vayalar Sarath Chandra Varma, Sudhakar Sharma, and Kaushal Kishor.

No.	Title	Lyrics	Singer(s)	Length
1.	"Aye Janani"	Sandeep Nath	Sonu Nigam	4:56
2.	"Pakida Pakida"	Vayalar Sarath Chandra Varma	M. G. Sreekumar, Neetha Subhir	4:22
3.	"Ho Chupi He"	Kaushal Kishor	Kailash Kher	4:23
4.	"Dheemee Dheemee"	Sudhakar Sharma	Sunidhi Chauhan	4:18
5.	"Aye Janani"	Sandeep Nath	Neetha Subhir	5:08
6.	"Ho Chupi"	Kaushal Kishor	Kailash Kher	4:39
7.	"Tigde Tigde"	Sandeep Nath	Amit Kumar, Neetha Subhir	4:22

== Release ==
The film was released on 16 December 2010 in 111 theatres in Kerala, 9 theatres in Bengaluru, 5 theatres in Chennai, and around 18 theatres in Mumbai, Delhi, Pune and Hyderabad. Kandahar has collected ₹ 5.25 crores revenue from before releasing through selling satellite rights, audio rights, video rights, overseas distribution rights, and theatre advances.

== Reception ==
Kandahar received mixed reviews upon release. Though it was one of the most-awaited films of the year, it failed to attain a good word-of-mouth. A review by Sify, which rated it "below average" said, "There are moments when every Indian would feel proud about being born in this great land, but the shaky script, ordinary action sequences and a faulty climax lets the film down." Rediff published a nearly negative review saying, "A better script would have perhaps made the return of Major Mahadevan more appealing." It rated the film 2.5 in a scale of five.

== Accolades ==
Asianet Film Awards

- 2010 - Best Feature Film on National Integration Award - Major Ravi
