= Mission 90 Days =

- DVD release of Mission 90 Days.
- Directed by: Major Ravi
- Screenplay by: Major Ravi; S. Tirru; Shiju Nambiath (dialogues)
- Story by: Major Ravi
- Produced by: Sasi Ayyanchira
- Starring: Mammootty; Tulip Joshi; Lalu Alex; Innocent; Baburaj; Radhika
- Cinematography: Tirru
- Edited by: Jayashanjar
- Music by: Jaison J Nair
- Release date: 12 July 2007
- Country: India
- Language: Malayalam

Mission 90 Days is a 2007 Indian Malayalam-language film directed by retired Army officer and former commando Major AK Raveendran SM starring Mammooty. It is Major Ravi's second directorial venture and is based on the assassination of former Indian Prime Minister Rajiv Gandhi and the following investigation.

== Plot ==
Rajiv Gandhi was assassinated on 21 May 1991 in Sriperumbudur, in Tamil Nadu. The government of India constituted SIT a day later, and Major Sivaram a top investigation officer and a NSG commando with a proven track record is put in charge to hunt down the killers. His bosses Partipan, the SIT chief and DIG Raju give him all the necessary logical support with only one request- "Catch Sivarasan alive, before he consumes the deadly cyanide."

Sivaram due to his meticulous and systematic search is able to piece together the case, after the arrest of Murugan, Nalini, and their interrogation leads the team to the conspirator Sivarasan hiding in a house in Bangalore. The crux of the story is the last 15 minutes climax of the film. Sivaram and his team have silently and stealthily moved and covered the house where the killers are staying. They are moving in for the final kill under the cover of darkness; waiting for orders from higher-ups sitting in Delhi, to start the operations.

But bosses in Delhi want it to be delayed, so that they can be on the spot to corner the glory of capturing Sivarasan alive in front of the media! Major Sivaram, waits the entire night for the order to start the operation, which is given only next day after the bosses arrive, at 10am in broad daylight in front of thousands of onlookers and bungling Karnataka police. The surprise element in the operation is lost as Sivaram finds to his horror the entire LTTE team had bitten the cyanide and Sivarasan the kingpin had shot himself, a few seconds before they broke in.

== Cast ==
- Mammootty as Major Sivaram, An army officer and commando in NSG, A member of the Special Investigation Team. This character is based on the professional life of Major AK Raveendran SM (also known as Major Ravi), who wrote the story of this film and directed this film.
- Lalu Alex as Deputy Inspector General Radhavinod Raju IPS, CBI officer & Chief of the Special Investigation Team.
- Vijayaraghavan as Colonel Vijay, NSG officer, Sivaram's superior officer
- Kiran Raj as Salim Ali IPS, CBI officer & member of the Special Investigation Team
- Baburaj as Major Deepak, NSG officer & SIT member
- Abu Salim as DSP Shivaji, SIT member
- Sindhu Shyam as Journalist
- Cochin Haneefa as Doctor Rajendran, SIT member
- Pradeep Chandran as NSG commando Prathapan, SIT member
- Kollam Ajith as Raghoothaman Inspector, SIT member
- Tulip Joshi as Anitha Sivaram, wife of Major Sivaram.
- Radhika as Nalini, wife of LTTE member Murugan
- Sreejith Ravi as Sivarasan, LTTE member
- Bineesh Kodiyeri as Murugan
- Kannan Pattambi as Dixon
- Ravi Mariya as ACP Chempayya, Bangalore police
- Kalasala Babu as Ramalingam IPS, Commissioner of Police, Bangalore City
- Salim Kumar as Aravindan
- Innocent as Sivaram's father, retired army officer
- Siddharth Vipin as Rajiv Gandhi
- Devi as Dhanu, the suicide bomber who assassinated Rajiv Gandhi.
- Denny Philip
- Manikandan Pattambi
- Geetha Vijayan
- Major Ravi as NSG officer (Cameo appearance)

== Songs ==
Song	Lyricist	Music director	Singer
Shaan hai thoo	Sajath, Farhad	Sajath, Farhad	Shalini Singh
Mizhineeru pozhiyumbozhum	Vayalar Sarathchandra Varma	Jaison J Nair	Najim Arshad
