= Jerry Prem Raj =

Indian Army officer

Captain Jerry Prem Raj VrC
- Born: Venganoor, Kerala, India
- Died: 7 July 1999; Tiger Hill, Kargil, India
- Military career
- Allegiance: India
- Branch: Indian Army
- Service years: 1997–1999
- Rank: Captain
- Service number: SS-37033
- Unit: 158 Med Regt (SP)
- Conflicts: Kargil War †
- Awards: Vir Chakra

Captain Jerry Prem Raj, VrC, was a commissioned officer in the Indian Army during the Kargil War. He was a Forward Observation Officer at Point 4875. During battle, he sustained grievous injuries but showing undaunted courage, continued to direct artillery fire against enemy positions. He succumbed to his injuries later the same day. Because of his effort in the battle, he was declared a war hero. His body was cremated in his native city,Thiruvananthapuram. He was awarded the Vir Chakra, the third highest wartime gallantry award, posthumously.

== Personal life and career ==
Captain Jerry Prem Raj was born in Venganoor, near Kovalam in Thiruvananthapuram district of Kerala state in India. His father Retna Raj worked in the Department of Technical Education, Kerala and his mother Chella Thayee worked in the Health Department of the Government of Kerala. His brother is Rejinald Pavithran, a retired officer of the Indian Air force. Captain Jerry Premraj married Praseena in April 1999.

Captain Jerry Prem Raj was commissioned into the 158 Medium Regiment (SP) on 5 September 1997 from Officers Training Academy, Chennai.

== Kargil War ==
He answered the call of duty and rejoined the unit under Operation Vijay after voluntarily cutting short his honeymoon. On the night of 6 July 1999, he was the Forward Observation Post Officer with 2 Naga during its assault on Twin Bumps in area Point 4875 (Gun Hill) in Dras Sector. During the assault, while directing artillery fire onto the enemy positions with devastating effect, he was wounded by enemy sniper fire.

Undeterred, he continued his mission amidst heavy enemy fire, when he was yet again hit by a volley of enemy machine gun fire. Gravely injured, he refused to be evacuated and continued to direct accurate artillery fire onto the enemy till he succumbed to his injuries. His action resulted in inflicting heavy casualties on the enemy and in the capture of the objective by assaulting infantry. His remains were carried by Maj Amarpal Singh of 158 Medium regiment from Delhi to Thiruvananthapuram. A flower-decked military vehicle carried his body from airport to his home which was lined up on both sides by the people of the city who showered flower petals on the vehicle as a final farewell. The display of courage and resolve in the face of insurmountable odds earned Captain Jerry a Vir Chakra award posthumously.

== Vir Chakra Citation ==
The Vir Chakra citation on the Official Indian Army Website reads as follows:

Gazette Notification: 18 Pres/2000,15-8-99

Operation: – Date of Award: 07 Jul 1999

Citation: On the night of 6th/7th July 1999 during "Operation Vijay", Captain R. Jery Prem Raj was the Forward Observation Post Officer with 2 Naga tasked to launch an assault on Twin Bumps in area Gun Hill in Drass sub-sector. During the assault, Captain R. Jery Prem Raj searched, sought and identified enemy positions and directed accurate artillery fire onto them with devastating effect.

In this endeavor, he was shot by enemy sniper fire. Undeterred, he continued to bring down effective fire on enemy positions. However he was again hit by a volley of enemy machine gun fire. Though severely wounded, he continued to direct accurate fire onto the enemy until he succumbed to his injuries. By then he had inflicted heavy casualties on the enemy that not only assisted in the capture of the objectives but also helped in minimizing casualties to own infantry.

Captain R. Jery Prem Raj displayed bravery of a very high order and tremendous professional acumen with total disregard to his safety and made the supreme sacrifice.
