= Major Mahadevan =

Fictional character portrayed by Mohanlal

Colonel Mahadevan
- Major Mahadevan series character
- Mohanlal as Major Mahadevan in Kandahar
- First appearance: Keerthi Chakra (2006)
- Last appearance: 1971: Beyond Borders (2017)
- Created by: Major Ravi
- Portrayed by: Mohanlal

In-universe information
- Nickname: Mahi
- Gender: Male
- Title(s): Major, Colonel
- Occupation: NSG Team Commander, army officer
- Family: Major Sahadevan (father); Parvathy Sahadevan (mother)
- Spouse: Sreekutty
- Children: Arathi Mahadevan
- Nationality: Indian

Major Mahadevan is a fictional character and the protagonist in the Major Mahadevan film series. The character was created by Major Ravi and is portrayed by Mohanlal. Mahadevan is a commanding officer in the Indian Army, who held the title Major and was promoted to a Colonel. He first appears in the 2006 film Kirthi Chakra, and later in the sequels Kurukshetra (2008), Kandahar (2010), and 1971: Beyond Borders (2017).

Major Mahadevan is one of the most influential characters to have appeared in Malayalam cinema. Mohanlal was given an honorary position as a lieutenant colonel in the Territorial Army of India by the Indian Ministry of Defence, taking into account his honest portrayal of an army man and the reach the character got through the films Kirthi Chakra (2006) and Kurukshetra (2008). The third installment Kandahar was released in 2010. He appeared in the latest film 1971: Beyond Borders in 2017.

== Family ==
Mahadevan was married and had a daughter, Arathi Mahadevan with his wife, Sreekutty (portrayed by Lakshmi Gopalaswamy), who were killed in a bomb explosion. Both his wife and daughter appeared in the first film Keerthi Chakra. His father Sahadevan was a war veteran, an army Major, who had fought in the Indo-Pakistani War of 1971. Major Sahadevan appeared in the 2017 prequal 1971: Beyond Borders.

== Appearances ==
=== Single role films ===
Year	Film	Role	Co-Actors	Language	Installments	Notes
2006	Keerthi Chakra	Major / Colonel Mahadevan	Jiiva	Malayalam	First Installment	Original
2008	Kurukshetra	Major / Colonel Mahadevan	Ravi Mariya	Malayalam	Second Installment	Sequel
2010	Kandahar	Major / Colonel Mahadevan	Amitabh Bachchan and Ganesh Venkatraman	Malayalam	Third Installment	Prequel

=== Non-Single role films ===
Year	Film	Role	Co-Actors	Language	Installments	Notes
2017	1971 Beyond Borders	Major / Colonel Mahadevan and Major / Brigadier Sahadevan (Double Role as father and son)	Allu Sirish, Arunoday Singh and Deepak Jethi	Malayalam	Fourth and Final Installment	Sequel in present story in the year is 2017 and Prequel in past story in the year is 1971.
