= Major Ravi =

Indian actor, director and politician (born 1958)

Major A. K. Raveendran Nair SM
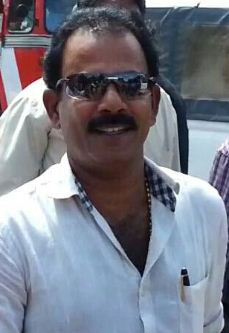
- Born: 13 June 1958 (age 68); Pattambi, Palakkad, Kerala, India
- Other name: Major Ravi
- Education: Army Cadet College, Indian Military Academy
- Occupations: Indian Army; Commando; Film director; screenwriter; actor; politician
- Political party: Bharatiya Janata Party (2023-present)
- Other political affiliations: Indian National Congress (2021-2023)
- Spouse: Anitha (m. 1988)
- Children: Arjun Ravi
- Parents: P. Kuttisankaran Nair; A. T. Satyabhama
- Relatives: Kannan Pattambi (Brother)
- Military career
- Allegiance: India
- Branch: Indian Army
- Rank: Major

A. K. Raveendran Nair (born 13 June 1958), popularly known as Major Ravi, is a retired officer of the Indian Army, former National Security Guard commando, politician, former marathon athlete, film actor and film director predominantly works in Malayalam cinema and some films in Tamil and Hindi. He was awarded the President's gallantry medal in 1991 and 1992 for his contributions in fighting terrorism in Punjab and Kashmir. After retiring from the army, he began his career in Indian cinema as a consultant for military-based films. He made his independent directorial debut in 2006 with Keerthi Chakra for which he won the Kerala State Film Award for Best Screenplay.

== Family ==
Ravi was born to Indian Army soldier P. Kuttisankaran Nair and A. T. Satyabhama in Malabar, Palakkad, Kerala. He is married to Anitha. The couple has a son Arjun Ravi.

== Military career ==
He joined the army as a Sepoy after his schooling and later pursued his studies within the army and graduated from the Army Cadet College and from the Indian Military Academy to become an officer in Dec 1984. He served in the Indian Army as a commando in the National Security Guards, as aide-de-camp (ADC) to the then chief of Indian Army General Sunith Francis Rodrigues and as an officer in the Indian Military Intelligence in the Andaman and Nicobar Islands and Jammu and Kashmir. He was a member of the mission code-named Operation One Eyed Jack to capture suspects of the Rajiv Gandhi assassination (the assassination of Rajiv Gandhi by Thenmozhi Rajaratnam on 21 May 1991 at Sriperumbudur in Tamil Nadu). His military tenure of three years in the National Security Guard as a commando inspired him to direct Keerthi Chakra (2006) and Mission 90 Days (2007). He retired from the army with the rank of major.

== Film career ==
After serving for 24 years in the Indian Army, he became a military consultant for Indian films. He has worked with Indian film makers Priyadarshan, Rajkumar Santoshi, Kamal Haasan, and Mani Ratnam. His first feature film was Keerti Chakra, a film on Kashmir militancy.

His second movie Mission 90 Days was his own experience of the mission to capture the suspects of Rajiv Gandhi murder case. His third project Kurukshetra based on the Kargil war starring Mohanlal was a sequel to Keerthi Chakra. The 2010 film Kandahar was a third installment to the Major Mahadevan film series.

In 2012, he directed Karma Yodha with Mohanlal. In 2015, Picket 43, starring Prithviraj and Javed Jaffery was made. It turned out to be a hit. He is now heading towards a fourth installment in the Major Mahadevan series. About the film he quoted: "The focus will be on the individuals rather than the war, and will portray the relationships that are forged during the war."

In 2025 after a 13-year-long legal battle, Kottayam Commercial Court ruled that 'Karma Yodha' script was plagiarised and Major Ravi was ordered to pay ₹30 lakh to the original author Reji Mathew as compensation

== Political career ==
In 2021, Raveendran joined Indian National Congress but left the party owing to difference of opinion with the leadership.

In 2023, he joined Bharathiya Janata Party and he is appointed Kerala State Vice Presidents of the party.

In 2026 Kerala Legislative Assembly election, he contested as BJP candidate from Ottapalam Assembly constituency in Palakkad district. He got third position.

== Filmography ==
Year	Title	Credited as			Notes
Year	Title	Director	Writer	Actor	Notes
1999	Megham			Yes	
1999	Olympian Anthony Adam			Yes	
2000	Sradha			Yes	
2000	Pukar			Yes	Hindi film
2000	Snegithiye			Yes	Bilingual film (Malayalam and Tamil)
2001	Aalavandhan			Yes	Tamil film
2002	Onnaman			Yes	
2002	Punarjani	Yes	Yes		Co-director
2003	Lesa Lesa			Yes	Tamil film
2003	Pattalam			Yes	
2006	Keerthi Chakra	Yes	Yes		
2007	Raakilipattu			Yes	
2007	Mission 90 Days	Yes	Yes	Yes	
2008	Kurukshetra	Yes	Yes		
2010	Toofan	Yes	Yes	Yes	Hindi film
2010	Kandahar	Yes	Yes	Yes	
2012	Karma Yodha	Yes	No		Court ruled in 2025 that ‘Karmayodha’ script was plagiarised
2013	Oru Yathrayil	Yes	Yes		Segments Amma and I Love My Appa
2015	Picket 43	Yes	Yes		
2015	Anarkali			Yes	
2016	Action Hero Biju	No	No	Yes	
2016	Marubhoomiyile Aana			Yes	
2017	Lavakusha			Yes	
2017	1971: Beyond Borders	Yes	Yes		
2019	Driving License	No	No	Yes	
2020	Varane Avashyamund	No	No	Yes	
2021	The Last Two Days			Yes	
2021	Oru Thathvika Avalokanam			Yes	
2022	Santacruz			Yes	Filming
2022	Mei Hoom Moosa			Yes	
2022	Meppadiyan			Yes	
2023	Valatty	No	No	Yes	Cameo appearance
2023	Garudan	No	No	Yes	
2024	Thankamani	No	No	Yes	
2024	Kishkindha Kaandam	No	No	Yes	
2025	Raveendra Nee Evide?	No	No	Yes	
2025	Ambalamukkile Visheshangal	No	No	Yes	
2026	Spa	No	No	Yes	
2026	Baby Girl	No	No	Yes	

== Television ==
Year	Show	Role	Channel
2018–2019	Unarunna Keralam	Host	Amrita TV
2020-2021	Flowers students startup	Judge	Flowers TV
2021	Charithram Enniloode	Narrator	Safari TV
2021-2022	Beautiful Minds	Host	Behindwoods ICE

== Awards ==
- Sena Medal
- Kerala State Film Awards
  - 2006: Best Screen Play - Keerthi Chakra
- Asianet Film Awards
  - 2006: Best Director Award - Keerthi Chakra
- 2008: Special Honour Jury Award - Kurukshetra
  - 2010: Best Feature Film on National Integration Award - Kandahar
