= Drishyam (film series) =

Indian film series

- Created by: Jeethu Joseph
- Owner: Aashirvad Cinemas

Films and television
- Films: Drishyam (2013); Drishyam 2 (2021); Drishyam 3 (2026)

Miscellaneous
- Budget: est.₹19.5 — ₹21 crores (2 films)
- Box Office: est.₹304 crores (2 films)

Drishyam is an Indian Malayalam-language crime thriller film series, written and directed by Jeethu Joseph, produced by Antony Perumbavoor under Aashirvad Cinemas. It stars Mohanlal, Meena, Ansiba Hassan and Esther Anil as Georgekutty, Rani George, Anju George and Anu George. The film series follows the struggle of Georgekutty and his family who are considered as the main suspects when Varun Prabhakar, the son of the inspector-general of police, goes missing.

It has been remade in several regional languages including Tamil, Telugu, Hindi, and Kannada, as well as internationally in Sinhalese, Chinese, and Indonesian.

The first installment to the film series, Drishyam, released on 19 December 2013, met with widespread critical acclaim and was a major box office success as the highest-grossing Malayalam film at that time.

The sequel Drishyam 2, shot completely in the COVID-19 pandemic, was released through Amazon Prime Video on 19 February 2021. Drishyam 2 was critically acclaimed, being known as 'one of the best ever sequels in Indian cinema'.

The third instalment in the series, Drishyam 3 was released on 21 May 2026.

== Development ==
=== Drishyam ===
In July 2013, it was reported that Jeethu Joseph will be directing a film titled My Family with Mohanlal in the lead. In August 2013, Jeethu clarified that the film was titled Drishyam. A thread similar to that of Drishyam has been with the director since the early 1990s. He was inspired by a conversation he had overheard about the plight of two families involved in a legal battle. Jeethu had penned the story of Drishyam even before Memories (2013). He says, "I started working on the subject some two years back. But I wanted to stick to the planned order and hence postponed the project till I finished Memories". The script was initially planned to be filmed by another director but since that director could not find a producer, Jeethu took back the script and decided to direct it himself. Drishyam contrasts from the director's previous films. He says, "Different films require different treatment. I toiled hard while filming Memories as the film was full of twists and turns and the handling of the subject mattered a lot. But Drishyam is a complete script-oriented film that does not require any special effort. We shot the film sticking completely to the script, and the shooting was completed effortlessly."

=== Drishyam 2 ===
Jeethu Joseph and Mohanlal were filming for Ram prior to the COVID-19 lockdown in India, however the shooting of the film was stalled as some sequences they want to film in foreign locations, such as London and Cairo. As the crew realised that the filming would take time to continue, Jeethu decided to start the works for Drishyam 2, a sequel to their 2013 film Drishyam for which he had plans for a while. As the shooting of the film would only take place in Kerala, Jeethu realised it was the most appropriate film to shoot after the lockdown ended. The film was officially announced by Mohanlal on his 60th birthday on 21 May 2020. It was intended to start filming soon after the government allows permission to begin film shootings. Mohanlal said during an interview that he has read the script, and shooting might begin after lockdown. Antony Perumbavoor who produced Drishyam returns as the producer. Jeethu said that it is a direct continuation of the last film and for that he has retained the principal characters along with some new additions in the secondary cast. In the turn of events, Georgekutty and his family now leads an affluent life and Georgekutty has opened a cinema theatre and is also planning to produce a film.

=== Drishyam 3 ===
Jeethu Joseph stated that the idea for a third part came to him after completing Drishyam 2, beginning with the climax that first took shape in his mind. During the film's release, when Mohanlal asked whether there was a possibility of another sequel, he shared with him the envisioned climax of the potential continuation, which Mohanlal liked and encouraged Jeethu to develop further. In February 2021, shortly after the release of Drishyam 2, producer Antony Perumbavoor told Manorama News that Jeethu was contemplating about Drishyam 3 and had discussed it with Mohanlal, expressing hope that it would happen. A few days later, Jeethu told The Quint, "if I get a thread good enough to explore, I will start developing it. It will be a crime if I don't". At the Mazhavil Entertainment Awards in August 2022, Antony confirmed that Drishyam 3 would "definitely happen" and they were working on ideas. In November that year, Jeethu stated that he had "something in mind. However, I'm still looking for the spark to move it forward".

In a March 2024 interview with Deccan Chronicle, Jeethu said he was exploring the possibility of a sequel and would proceed only if he found a good idea, stressing that he would never make a sequel purely for financial gain. In August 2024, during an interview with Red FM, he revealed that he was stuck on a particular area of the story, though he already knew how the film would end. On 20 February 2025, Drishyam 3 was officially announced by Mohanlal through his social media handles.

== Cast and crew ==
=== Cast ===
==== Drishyam ====
- Mohanlal as Georgekutty, a local cable TV operator
- Meena as Rani George, Georgekutty's wife
- Ansiba Hassan as Anju George, George's elder daughter
- Esther Anil as Anumol George (Anu), George's younger daughter
- Asha Sharath as Geetha Prabhakar, Inspector General of Police
- Siddique as Prabhakar, Geetha's husband
- Kalabhavan Shajon as Constable Sahadevan Ramkant
- Neeraj Madhav as Monichan, George's aide
- Irshad as SI Suresh Babu
- Roshan Basheer as Varun Prabhakar, Geetha & Prabhakar's son
- Aneesh G. Menon as Rajesh, Rani's brother
- Kunchan as Head constable S. Madhavan
- Kozhikode Narayanan Nair as Sulaiman, Owner of the Tea Shop
- Baiju V. K. as Soman
- P. Sreekumar as Rani's father
- Shobha Mohan as Rani's mother
- Koottickal Jayachandran as Murali
- Kalabhavan Rahman as Bus Conductor
- Kalabhavan Haneef as Theatre Operator
- Balaji Sharma as Restaurant Owner
- Pradeep Chandran as the new Sub-Inspector
- Antony Perumbavoor as Antony, a police officer
- Mela Raghu as Raghu, Waiter at the Tea Shop
- Arun S. Panackal as Alex, Varun's friend at Nature Camp
- Nisha Sarang as School Principal
- Jeethu Joseph as Contractor of Police Station building

==== Drishyam 2 ====
- Mohanlal as Georgekutty – A movie theatre owner and aspiring film producer
- Meena as Rani George – Georgekutty's wife; Anju and Anu's mother; a homemaker
- Ansiba Hassan as Anju George – Georgekutty and Rani's college-going elder daughter; a PTSD patient
- Esther Anil as Anu George – Georgekutty and Rani's school-going younger daughter
- Murali Gopy as IG Thomas Bastin IPS – Geetha’s friend
- Asha Sharath as Geetha Prabhakar – Varun’s mother; former Inspector General of Police (resigned)
- Siddique as Prabhakar – Varun's father; Geetha's husband
- Saikumar as Vinayachandran – A screenwriter
- K. B. Ganesh Kumar as Philip Mathew – Circle Inspector of Police; member of Bastin’s Investigation Team
- Anjali Nair as Saritha – Georgekutty's neighbor-Sabu's wife;an undercover cop; member of Bastin’s Investigation Team
- Sumesh Chandran as Sabu – Georgekutty's neighbor-Saritha's husband;an undercover cop; member of Bastin’s Investigation Team
- Ajith Koothattukulam as Jose George – An ex-convict sentenced for homicide
- Santhi Mayadevi as Advocate Renuka – a defense lawyer appearing for Georgekutty
- Dinesh Prabhakar as Rajan – Kottayam Medical College's Forensic Medicine block security whom Georgekutty befriends with him
- Antony Perumbavoor as Antony Joseph – Sub Inspector of Police
- Kozhikode Narayanan Nair as Sulaiman – A tea shop owner who is a sympathiser of Georgekutty
- Raghu as Raghu – Sulaiman’s assistant in his tea shop
- Adam Ayub as Judge of District Court, Thodupuzha
- Krishna as Police Forensic Surgeon
- Joy Mathew as Advocate Janardhanan – The public prosecutor appearing for police
- Boban Samuel as DySP Raghuram
- Rajesh Paravoor as Tehsildar
- Krishna Praba as Mary – Jose's wife
- Pauly Valsan as Jose's mother
- Ranjini George as Dr. Renjini P Dev - Anju's doctor
- Murali Kannur as DGP V. Jayakrishnan IPS
- Shobha Mohan as Rani's mother
- Aneesh G. Menon as Rajesh, Rani's brother and local politician
- Jayashankar as Pathrose – A gravedigger whom Georgekutty befriends with him.
- Kalabhavan Shajon as Constable Sahadevan Ramkant (mentioned only)
- Neeraj Madhav as Monichan, George's aide (mentioned only)

==== Drishyam 3 ====
- Mohanlal as Georgekutty – A movie theatre owner and film producer
- Meena as Rani George – Georgekutty's wife; Anju and Anu's mother; a homemaker
- Ansiba Hassan as Anju George – Georgekutty and Rani's post graduate elder daughter
- Esther Anil as Anu George – Georgekutty and Rani's post graduate younger daughter
- Kalabhavan Shajohn as Sahadevan
- Siddique as Prabhakar
- Murali Gopy as IG Thomas Bastin IPS
- Biju Menon as Harikumar
- Asha Sharath as Geetha Prabhakar – Varun’s mother who suffers depression; former Inspector General of Police (resigned)
- Veena Nandakumar as Yami Sahadevan – a reporter who finds to trace Georgekutty also Sahadevan's daughter
- Santhi Mayadevi as Advocate Renuka – a defense lawyer appearing for Georgekutty
- Sumesh Chandran as Sabu
- Ajith Koothattukalum as Jose
- Dinesh Prabhakar as Rajan
- Irshad as Suresh Babu - a retired Police Officer
- K. B. Ganesh Kumar as Philip Mathew — Deputy superintendent of police
- Shiva Hariharan as Rony
- Adam Ayub as Judge
- Riyas Narmakala as Mathayi - a marriage broker
- Muhammad Musthafa as Aneesh Raj
- Srikant Murali as Public Prosecutor (PP)
- Antony Perumbavoor as Antony Joseph – Circle Inspector of Police
- Krishna Praba as Mary — Jose's wife
- Shraddha Gokul as Shreya — Pathro's daughter
- Faizal P. V. as Abraham
- Nikhil Nair as Avira Chacko, Anju's fiancee
- Lishoy as Chacko, Avira's father
- Priya Sreejith as Avira's mother
- Ranjini George as Dr. Ranjini P Dev - Anju's doctor
- Sajitha Sreejith as Dr. Priya
- Aneesh G. Menon as Rajesh, Rani's brother and local politician
- Shobha Mohan as Rani's mother
- Prashanth Madhav as Broker James
- Jayashankar as Pathros
- Saumya Bhagyan Pillai as Shanthi
- Johny Antony as Jacob (Voiceover)
- Jeethu Joseph as Roshy (Voiceover)
- Anjali Nair as Saritha (mentioned only)

=== Crew ===
Designation	Film		
Designation	Drishyam (2013)	Drishyam 2 (2021)	Drishyam 3 (2026)
Director	Jeethu Joseph		
Producer	Antony Perumbavoor		
Writer	Jeethu Joseph		
Cinematography	Sujith Vaassudev	Satheesh Kurup	
Editor	Ayoob Khan	V. S. Vinayak	
Music	Anil Johnson; Vinu Thomas	Anil Johnson	
Art Director	Sabu Ram	Rajeev Kovilakom	Prasanth Madhav
Costume Designer	Linta Jeethu		

== Remakes ==
=== Drishyam ===
Drishyam was remade into several languages. The Indian remake rights of the film were sold for ₹155 million. All the versions were commercially successful. The film was remade in Kannada as Drishya (2014), in Telugu as Drushyam (2014), in Tamil as Papanasam (2015) by Joseph himself, in Hindi as Drishyam (2015), in Sinhala as Dharmayuddhaya (2017) in Mandarin Chinese as Sheep Without a Shepherd (2019) with a different ending, and in Indonesian as Ayah, Aku Mau Cerita... (2026)

Language	Name	Cast	Director
Kannada	Drishya (2014)	Ravichandran, Navya Nair, Asha Sharath	P. Vasu.
Telugu	Drushyam (2014)	Venkatesh, Meena, Nadhiya	Sripriya
Tamil	Papanasam (2015)	Kamal Haasan, Gautami, Asha Sharath	Jeethu Joseph
Hindi	Drishyam (2015)	Ajay Devgan, Shriya Saran, Tabu	Nishikant Kamat
Sinhala	Dharmayuddhaya (2017)	Jackson Anthony, Dilhani, Kusum Renu	Cheyyar Ravi
Chinese (Mandarin)	Sheep Without a Shepherd (2019)	Xiao Yang, Tan Zhuo, Joan Chen	Sam Quah
Indonesian	Ayah, Aku Mau Cerita... (2026)	Vino G. Bastian, Niken Anjani, Marsha Timothy	Danial Rifki

=== Drishyam 2 ===
The film was remade in Kannada as Drishya 2 (2021) directed by P. Vasu and in Telugu as Drushyam 2 (2021) by Jeethu Joseph himself. The Hindi remake titled Drishyam 2 (2022) was directed by Abhishek Pathak. Jeethu had plans to direct a Tamil remake. A Sinhalese remake titled Dharmayuddhaya 2 was released in 2026.

Language	Name	Cast	Director
Kannada	Drishya 2 (2021)	Ravichandran, Navya Nair, Asha Sharath	P. Vasu
Telugu	Drushyam 2 (2021)	Venkatesh, Meena, Nadhiya	Jeethu Joseph
Hindi	Drishyam 2 (2022)	Ajay Devgan, Akshaye Khanna, Shriya Saran, Tabu	Abhishek Pathak
Sinhala	Dharmayuddhaya 2 (2026)	Bimal Jayakody, Dilhani Ekanayake, Kusum Renu, Ashan Dias	Aruna Jayawardana

=== Drishyam 3 ===
Unlike the previous films in the franchise, Drishyam 3 released in Telugu, Tamil, and Kannada as dubbed versions of the original Malayalam film instead of being remade separately in those languages. The Hindi version, titled Drishyam: The Conclusion, directed by Abhishek Pathak and starring Ajay Devgn, released on 2 October 2026. Unlike the original, the Hindi version followed a different narrative and is not a direct remake.

== Revenue ==
=== Box Office ===
Film	Release date	Budget	Box office revenue	Ref.
Drishyam	19 December 2013	₹3.5–5 crores	₹62 crores	
Drishyam 2	19 February 2021	₹16 crores	₹239 crores	
Drishyam 3	21 May 2026	–	–	
Total		₹19.5–21 crores	₹301 crores	
