= Lafangey Parindey =

2010 Hindi-language romantic drama film

- Theatrical release poster
- Directed by: Pradeep Sarkar
- Written by: Gopi Puthran
- Produced by: Aditya Chopra
- Starring: Neil Nitin Mukesh; Deepika Padukone
- Cinematography: Natty Subramaniam
- Edited by: Sanjib Datta
- Music by: Songs: R. Anandh; Score: Zubin Balaporia
- Production company: Yash Raj Films
- Distributed by: Yash Raj Films
- Release date: 20 August 2010
- Running time: 155 minutes
- Country: India
- Language: Hindi
- Box office: ₹227 million (US$2.4 million)

Lafangey Parindey (transl. Cheeky Birds) is a 2010 Indian Hindi-language romantic drama film directed by Pradeep Sarkar and produced by Aditya Chopra under the Yash Raj Films banner. The film stars Neil Nitin Mukesh and Deepika Padukone in lead roles and blends elements of romance, sports, and resilience. Partially inspired by the 1978 American film Ice Castles the narrative follows a blind roller skater and a street fighter whose lives intertwine in the gritty underbelly of Mumbai.

Released theatrically on 20 August 2010, Lafangey Parindey received mixed reviews for its performances, soundtrack, and emotional core, while some criticism was directed toward its pacing and screenplay. The film marked Sarkar's second directorial collaboration with Yash Raj Films following Laaga Chunari Mein Daag (2007).

In parallel with the film's release, Indian software developer ASTPL launched a mobile video game based on the film's skating and boxing themes.

== Synopsis ==
Pinky Palkar is a spirited young woman from a Mumbai chawl who aspires to become a professional skater and win a reality television competition. Her aspirations are abruptly derailed when she is blinded in a freak accident caused by Nandan "One-Shot-Nandu" Kamthekar, a street fighter renowned for winning blindfolded bouts.

Overcome with guilt, Nandu resolves to help Pinky reclaim her dream. He begins training her to navigate the world through her remaining senses, helping her adapt to her new reality. In exchange, Pinky teaches Nandu how to skate, preparing him to become her partner in the competition. As they spend time together, a bond develops between them, eventually blossoming into love.

== Cast ==
- Neil Nitin Mukesh as Nandan 'One-Shot Nandu' Kamthekar
- Deepika Padukone as Pinky Palkar
- Kay Kay Menon as Anna (special appearance)
- Piyush Mishra as Usmaan Bhai
- Manish Choudhary as Inspector Keki Sethna
- Namit Das as Faizal Lateef Sheikh a.k.a. Chaddi
- Amey Pandya as Bablu Mane
- Rahul Pendkalkar as Pinky's younger brother
- Pankaj Jha as the Eunuch
- S. M. Zaheer as Commissioner M. Suri
- Viraj Adhav as Diesel a.k.a. Rameshwar Iyer
- Vinay Sharma as Gulkand
- Palomi as Tina Mukherjee
- Juhi Chawla as Judge (special appearance)
- Jaaved Jaaferi as Judge (special appearance)
- Shiamak Davar as Judge (special appearance)

== Production ==
Lafangey Parindey was shot on location in Mumbai, using real chawls and boxing arenas for authenticity. Neil Nitin Mukesh revealed that the fight scenes involved real physical contact, leading to injuries during filming.

== Soundtrack ==
Lafangey Parindey

Soundtrack album by R. Anandh
- Released: 20 July 2010
- Genre: Film soundtrack
- Length: 29.19
- Label: YRF Music
- Producers: Aditya Chopra and Yash Chopra

The soundtrack of Lafangey Parindey consists of six original tracks composed by R. Anandh, which marked his return to Hindi cinema after Zor (1998). The lyrics were penned by Swanand Kirkire.

No.	Title	Artist(s)	Length
1.	"Lafangey Parindey"	Ronit Sarkar	4:55
2.	"Mann Lafanga"	Mohit Chauhan	5:37
3.	"Dhatad Tatad"	Shail Hada, Anushka Manchanda	3:44
4.	"Nain Parindey"	Shilpa Rao	4:26
5.	"Rang Daalein"	Suraj Jagan	5:07
6.	"Born To Fly"	Instrumental	3:06
7.	"Mann Lafanga" (Club Mix)	Mohit Chauhan, Joshilay	3:45

Award Ceremony	Category	Recipient	Result	Ref.(s)
3rd Mirchi Music Awards	Best Song Recording	Anil Kumar Konakandla and Biswadeep Chatterjee (for "Man Lafanga")	Nominated	

== Reception ==
Lafangey Parindey received mixed reviews from critics. Subhash K. Jha of Indo-Asian News Service rated the film 3.5 out of 5, calling it “an inspirational tale told with as little fuss and as much feeling as cinematically possible,” and urged viewers not to miss it. Noyon Jyoti Parasara of AOL India gave it 3 out of 5, writing, “Expect fun and you won't be disappointed; expect goosebumps and you may be!”

Conversely, Rajeev Masand of CNN-IBN rated the film 2 out of 5, commenting, “It’s the kind of film that keeps you waiting for something to happen, but nothing ever does.” Sukanya Verma of Rediff.com also rated it 2.5 out of 5, describing the film as “unapologetically superficial with a brief attention span.” Mayank Shekhar of Hindustan Times was more critical, rating it 1.5 out of 5 and calling it a “scatterbrained mishmash of a movie.”
