= Drishyam 3 =

2026 Indian film by Jeethu Joseph

- Theatrical release poster
- Directed by: Jeethu Joseph
- Written by: Jeethu Joseph
- Produced by: Antony Perumbavoor
- Starring: Mohanlal; Meena; Ansiba Hassan; Esther Anil; Kalabhavan Shajohn; Siddique; Murali Gopy; Asha Sharath
- Cinematography: Satheesh Kurup
- Edited by: V. S. Vinayak
- Music by: Anil Johnson
- Production company: Aashirvad Cinemas
- Distributed by: see below
- Release date: 21 May 2026
- Running time: 160 minutes
- Country: India
- Language: Malayalam
- Box office: ₹237.70 crore

Drishyam 3: The Past Never Stays Silent, or simply Drishyam 3, is a 2026 Indian Malayalam-language crime drama film written and directed by Jeethu Joseph. Produced by Antony Perumbavoor for Aashirvad Cinemas, it is a sequel to Drishyam 2 (2021) and the third installment in the Drishyam film series. The film stars Mohanlal, alongside Meena, Ansiba Hassan, Esther Anil, Kalabhavan Shajon, Siddique, Murali Gopy, and Asha Sharath.

Principal photography commenced on 22 September 2025, and concluded on 2 December 2025. The film was released on 21 May 2026 and received mixed reviews from critics. Nonetheless, it emerged as a commercial success, grossing ₹237.70 crore to become the highest-grossing installment in the franchise and one of the highest-grossing Malayalam films ever made.

== Plot ==
Five years after the events of Drishyam 2, Georgekutty’s life appears stable. He has adapted the story of his past into a successful film and continues to live with his family while attempting to move forward. However, journalists Yami and Rony begin investigating possible real-life inspirations behind the film, particularly the circumstances surrounding Varun’s death. Georgekutty denies any connection between the film and real events, despite increasing public scrutiny.

Meanwhile, Georgekutty encounters Jose and Mary, who seek his forgiveness for past wrongdoing. He assures them that Jose’s actions were not wrong and provides financial assistance to help them restart their lives. Jose also becomes a trusted friend and confidant of Georgekutty. At home, Georgekutty and Rani search for a suitable marriage proposal for their daughter Anju through the marriage broker Mathayi. However, each promising alliance is repeatedly disrupted by anonymous interference. Georgekutty later traces the calls with assistance from retired police officer Suresh Babu and identifies the callers as Rajan and his wife Shanthi. Rajan, previously suspended for assisting Georgekutty, had suffered severe personal and financial consequences, including his daughter’s educational disruption and a suicide attempt that left her unable to speak. Feeling abandoned after Georgekutty failed to recognize his situation, Rajan develops resentment toward him.

Shortly afterward, Georgekutty becomes aware of suspicious activity near his plantation after Rani reports seeing an unknown person in the area. He discovers that a pit had been dug and later refilled. His investigation is secretly observed by Sahadevan. Sahadevan, who was suspended from police service, has since become unstable and financially desperate. He seems to be investigating Georgekutty, with the help of his daughter, the journalist Yami, and have him arrested. In the process, Sahadevan forcibly obtains medical records from Dr. Ranjini, Anju’s psychiatrist, and intimidates Pathrose to gather further information about the unidentified skeletal remains previously used in the case. His activities are reported to Inspector general of police Thomas Bastin by Sabu, leading to Sahadevan’s questioning and subsequent arrest order.

At the same time, Bastin is approached by Prabhakar, who reveals that Geetha, now living in the United States, has developed severe depression following Varun’s funeral and the unresolved circumstances surrounding his death. Motivated by concern for her condition and resentment toward Georgekutty’s continued freedom, Prabhakar decides to act against him. He has hired Sahadevan and requests Bastin's support to gather evidence and reopen the case. Prabhakar has orchestrated a marriage proposal for Anju with Avira, a UAE-based businessman whom he has secretly manipulated into cooperation by resolving his financial difficulties. He also influences marriage brokers to ensure the proposal is accepted.

Prabhakar and Bastin plan to entrap Georgekutty by staging an incident in which Anju is drugged and falsely implicated in the death of Avira. The plan includes the use of falsified psychiatric records suggesting that Anju suffers from Sexual Aversion Syndrome, allegedly causing violent behavior when approached. This is intended to link the staged incident to Varun’s earlier death and secure convictions against Georgekutty and Anju. However, the plan begins to unravel when Sahadevan deviates from the agreed sequence of events. During the staged encounter, Anju unexpectedly regains consciousness, causing panic. Sahadevan injures Anju, and flees, presumably with Avira. Georgekutty arrives shortly thereafter and deduces that the pit on his plantation was intended for concealment of Avira’s body. He mobilizes local support through his brother-in-law Rajesh, preventing further concealment of evidence, and along with Jose, he later locates Sahadevan, who is brutally assaulted and injured with a sharp dagger and coerced into recording a confession implicating Prabhakar and Bastin.

Following these events, Georgekutty offers to surrender to the police, accompanied by Advocate Renuka, while setting conditions regarding his family’s safety. Renuka later learns that Anju was attacked by Georgekutty himself in order to misdirect the investigation and protect her from external threats, with Sahadevan being framed for the act. In a post-credits scene, as Georgekutty’s surrender is broadcast, Geetha still not satisfied, wants Anju to also face justice, perturbing Prabhakar further.

== Cast ==
- Mohanlal as Georgekutty, a theatre owner and film producer
- Meena as Rani George, Georgekutty's wife
- Ansiba Hassan as Anju George, Georgekutty and Rani's elder daughter
- Esther Anil as Anu George, Georgekutty and Rani's younger daughter
- Kalabhavan Shajohn as Sahadevan, a real estate broker and former police constable
- Siddique as Prabhakar, Varun's father
- Murali Gopy as IG Thomas Bastin IPS, Head of the police department
- Asha Sharath as Geetha Prabhakar, Varun's mother and former IG of police
- Biju Menon as Actor Harikumar
- Veena Nandakumar as Yamini Sahadevan, Sahadevan's daughter
- Santhi Mayadevi as Advocate Renuka, Georgekutty's advocate
- Irshad as Suresh Babu, Georgekutty's friend and former police officer
- K. B. Ganesh Kumar as DySP Philip Mathew, Thomas Bastin's subordinate officer
- Sumesh Chandran as Sabu
- Ajith Koothattukalum as Jose
- Dinesh Prabhakar as Rajan
- Shiva Hariharan as Rony, Yamini's friend
- Adam Ayub as District Court Judge
- Riyas Narmakala as Broker Mathayi, Prabhakar's accomplice
- Muhammad Musthafa as Film Director Aneesh Raj
- Srikant Murali as Public Prosecutor (PP)
- Antony Perumbavoor as CI Antony
- Krishna Praba as Mary, Jose's wife
- Shraddha Gokul as Shreya
- Faizal P. V. as Abraham
- Nikhil Nair as Avira Chacko, Anju's ex-fiancé and Prabhakar's business partner
- Lishoy as Chacko, Avira's father
- Priya Sreejith as Avira's mother
- Ranjini George as Dr. Ranjini, Anju's doctor
- Sajitha Sreejith as Dr. Priya
- Aneesh G. Menon as Rajesh, Rani's brother and Georgekutty's brother-in-law
- Shobha Mohan as Rani's mother and Georgekutty's mother-in-law
- Prashanth Madhav as Broker James
- Jayashankar as Kuzhivettu Pathrose, Shreya's father
- Saumya Bhagyan Pillai as Shanthi, Rajan's wife
- Roshan Basheer as Varun Prabhakar (archived footage and mentioned only)
- Saikumar as Vinayachandran (archived footage and mentioned only)
- Kunchan as Head Constable Madhavan Nair (archived footage)
- Kozhikode Narayanan Nair as Sulaiman / Sulaimanikka (archived footage)
- Neeraj Madhav as Monichan (archived footage)
- Anjali Nair as Saritha, Sabu's wife (archived footage and mentioned only)
- Habeena Nijab as an actress
- Johny Antony as Jacob (voiceover)
- Jeethu Joseph as Roshy (voiceover)

Kunchacko Boban, Asif Ali, Rahman, Joju George, and Nimisha Sajayan appear in archival footages from certain films.

== Production ==
=== Development ===
Jeethu Joseph stated that the idea for a third part came to him after completing Drishyam 2, beginning with the climax that first took shape in his mind. During the film's release, when Mohanlal asked whether there was a possibility of another sequel, he shared with him the envisioned climax of the potential continuation, which Mohanlal liked and encouraged Jeethu to develop further. In February 2021, shortly after the release of Drishyam 2, producer Antony Perumbavoor told Manorama News that Jeethu was contemplating about Drishyam 3 and had discussed it with Mohanlal, expressing hope that it would happen. A few days later, Jeethu told The Quint, "if I get a thread good enough to explore, I will start developing it. It will be a crime if I don't". At the Mazhavil Entertainment Awards in August 2022, Antony confirmed that Drishyam 3 would "definitely happen" and they were working on ideas. In November that year, Jeethu stated that he had "something in mind. However, I'm still looking for the spark to move it forward".

In a March 2024 interview with Deccan Chronicle, Jeethu said he was exploring the possibility of a sequel and would proceed only if he found a good idea, stressing that he would never make a sequel purely for financial gain. In August 2024, during an interview with Red FM, he revealed that he was stuck on a particular area of the story, though he already knew how the film would end. On 20 February 2025, Drishyam 3 was officially announced by Mohanlal through his social media handles.

Jeethu also revealed that Drishyam 3 would not serve as a conclusion to Georgekutty's story. However, in February 2026, he stated that he is trying to end the series. In April 2026, Pen Studios published a statement announcing that they have invested ₹100 crore in Aashirvad Cinemas through Panorama Studios for Drishyam 3, without revealing further. Pen and Panorama received "presented by" credits in the film.

=== Filming ===
Principal photography began on 22 September 2025 at Sree Narayana Law College, Poothotta, Ernakulam, with a traditional pooja ceremony. Filming took place across Thodupuzha, Vagamon, Ernakulam and Thiruvalla. Filming was completed on 2 December 2025.

== Music ==
The film's soundtrack was composed by Anil Johnson, which was released by Panorama Music. The film has only one single, titled "Ini Varumo", which was released on 18 May 2026 and its female version was released on 20 May 2026. The full background score album was released on 3 June 2026.

== Release ==
=== Theatrical ===
Drishyam 3 was released worldwide on 21 May 2026, coinciding with Mohanlal's birthday. Earlier, the film was planned for release on 2 April 2026, but was postponed due to the 2026 Iran war.

=== Distribution ===
Panorama Studios and Pen Marudkar jointly bought the theatrical distribution rights in Rest of India. Phars Film acquired the distribution rights in GCC countries and Turkey while Hamsini Entertainments, Prathyangira Cinemas and York Cinemas acquired the distribution rights in North America reportedly for ₹10 crores (US$1 million). RFT Entertainments holds the distribution rights in UK, Ireland and rest of Europe.

=== Home media ===
In April 2026, Amazon Prime Video claimed to be the sole holder of the film's post-theatrical streaming rights, stating that the rights had been acquired through a valid agreement with the makers. The statement followed reports that the makers were negotiating streaming deals with other third parties. Subsequently, Amazon Prime Video filed a petition at the Delhi High Court, which granted interim relief restraining the makers from entering into agreements with third parties for the creation or exploitation of streaming rights related to the Drishyam film series. The film began streaming on the platform from 18 June 2026 in Malayalam and dubbed versions of Tamil, Telugu and Kannada languages.

== Reception ==
Drishyam 3 received mixed reviews from critics.

Rating 4 out of 5 stars, Suchin Mehrotra of The Quint described it as "a solid third chapter" and "a worthy sequel and continuation of Georgekutty’s journey, and I can’t think of a greater compliment". Sia Viju of Mathrubhumi, who also gave 4 out of 5 stars, noted that "Jeethu Joseph adopts a slightly different narrative rhythm here, choosing to explore emotional repercussions rather than purely relying on twists or procedural drama". Vishal Menon of The Hollywood Reporter India called the film a "mostly satisfying conclusion", noting that "the storytelling elevates Drishyam 3 beyond thriller territory into a complex morality tale".

Calling it "a hattrick", Athulya Nambiar of Mid-Day remarked that "it may seem that the twists and turns in the third film are not as elaborate or impactful as those in the earlier instalments. But that is precisely the point. Unlike the previous films, Georgekutty is never entirely in control of the narrative in Drishyam 3. He is constantly reacting to situations rather than orchestrating them". Bhawana Tanmayi of Moneycontrol rated 3.5 out of 5 stars and wrote that "the film has enough suspense and drama to satisfy fans of the franchise thanks to Mohanlal’s commanding performance and Jeethu Joseph’s storytelling".

Vignesh Madhu of The New Indian Express gave 3 out of 5 stars, describing it as "short on thrills, not soul". The film has "Mohanlal shining the best as the vulnerable Georgekutty, while Jeethu Joseph’s writing takes a hit despite some brave calls". Divya P. of Deccan Herald rated 3 out of 5 stars, stating that the "credit goes to Jeethu for creating Georgekutty, for whom the audience still roots for. Mohanlal ably anchors the film with his compelling performance", although she felt "Drishyam 3 does not quite meet the standards set by its predecessors". Anjana George of The Times of India awarded 3 out of 5 stars and wrote: "Jeethu Joseph attempts to explore guilt, paranoia, and psychological exhaustion more than suspense this time. The focus is not entirely on investigation or survival, but on how violence silently continues to exist inside relationships, memory, and everyday life".

Latha Srinivasan of NDTV gave 2.5 out of 5 stars, writing that "Drishyam 3 is not as thrilling and grilling as the previous two films but it is a must watch for Mohanlal and what Georgekutty represents". Janani K. of India Today gave 2.5 out of 5 stars, describing it as "a sequel that prioritises drama over intelligence. While the film has some meaty ideas that could make for a brilliant thriller, it settles for less because of its writing", but praised the actors' performances.

Gayathri Kallukaran of the Eastern Eye wrote that "Drishyam 3 may not deliver the Georgekutty many expected, but it offers a version of the character shaped by years of fear, guilt and survival. That change is likely to define much of the conversation around the film". Anandu Suresh of The Indian Express gave 2.5 out of 5 stars, writing that the "script feels all over the place, evidently torn between the writer-director's attempts to make it both an emotional drama and a crime thriller". However, "only Mohanlal delivers a performance worth mentioning. He highlights the many layers of Georgekutty's psyche with finesse, especially in the climax".

S. R. Praveen of The Hindu wrote that "Mohanlal’s interpretation of Georgekutty’s character saves the film from getting completely bogged down by director Jeethu Joseph’s outdated visual style and heavy-handed drama". Neeshita Nyayapati of the Hindustan Times gave 2 out of 5 stars, calling it "the weakest in Jeethu Joseph's hit franchise. It struggles even with its much-hyped twists".

Several online publications also analyzed the hidden narrative details and behind-the-scenes secrets that contributed to the film's massive success.

=== Box office ===
Drishyam 3 grossed around ₹237.70 crore worldwide by the end of its theatrical run.

== Potential sequel ==
During an appearance on a Reporter TV programme following the release of Drishyam 3, Jeethu Joseph addressed speculation about a fourth installment of the franchise. He stated that while he had previously intended Drishyam 3 to conclude Georgekutty's story, the audience response and discussions surrounding the film had prompted him to think about the possibility of continuing the series. Joseph said that he had begun considering ideas for a potential Drishyam 4, but emphasized that he would proceed only if he could develop a storyline that matched the standards and expectations associated with the Drishyam franchise. He added that the post-credit scene was designed to leave open the possibility of further exploration rather than serve as a definitive announcement of another sequel. In late August 2026, producer Antony Perumbavoor confirmed that Drishyam 4 would be made.
