= Dharmayuddhaya 2 =

- Sinhala: ධර්මයුද්ධය 2
- Directed by: Aruna Jayawardene
- Screenplay by: Aruna Jayawardene
- Story by: Jeethu Joseph
- Produced by: Maharaja Media Network
- Starring: Bimal Jayakody; Dilhani Ekanayake; Kusum Renu; Thisuri Yuwanika
- Cinematography: Channa Deshapriya
- Production companies: MTV Channel; The Capital Maharaja Organisation
- Distributed by: M Entertainments
- Release date: January 23, 2026 (Sri Lanka)
- Running time: 143 minutes
- Country: Sri Lanka
- Language: Sinhala
- Box office: 630.5 Million LKR

Dharmayuddhaya 2 (ධර්මයුද්ධය 2) is a 2026 Sri Lankan Sinhala-language crime drama film directed by Aruna Jayawardene and produced by the MTV Channel and The Capital Maharaja Organisation. It is the sequel to the 2017 Dharmayuddhaya and is a remake of the Indian Malayalam film Drishyam 2 (2021). The film stars Bimal Jayakody in the lead role, replacing the late Jackson Anthony, where Dilhani Ekanayake, Kusum Renu, Thisuri Yuwanika, Kumara Thirimadura, Douglas Ranasinghe and Vinumi Vansadhi reprised their roles. Dharmayuddhaya 2 is the second highest grossing Sri Lankan film of all time.

== Plot ==
Seven years have passed since the disappearance of Shane, and Harishchandra has moved up in the world, transitioning from a small real estate agent to a successful cinema owner. Despite his professional growth, his family remains deeply scarred by the past; Achini suffers from frequent seizures and anxiety due to the trauma, and the family lives under the constant, judgmental gaze of their neighbors. Harishchandra spends his time obsessively studying film scripts and technical filmmaking, ostensibly to produce a movie, but secretly to refine his knowledge of how to manipulate a narrative and stay one step ahead of the law.

The family’s peace is shattered when the investigation is reopened by a new, meticulous police team that views the case as a personal challenge. Unlike the previous investigators who used brute force, this team employs subtle psychological tactics and undercover operations. They plant a married couple as "friendly neighbors" next to Harishchandra’s house to spy on the family and gain their confidence. The breakthrough comes when a man who was a fugitive on the night of the murder returns to town and confesses that he saw Harishchandra leaving the site of the unfinished police station with a shovel seven years prior.

Armed with this new witness testimony, the police secure a warrant to dig up the foundation of the Manudampura Police Station. In front of a gathered crowd and the media, they successfully unearth a human skeleton. Harishchandra is immediately arrested, and his family is brought in for questioning once again. The police are confident that they finally have the physical evidence needed to secure a conviction, as the timeline and the location match the witness’s story perfectly.

However, Harishchandra reveals his ultimate "climax" during the legal proceedings. Having anticipated that the body would eventually be found, he had spent years tracking the police investigation and befriending graveyard staff. He secretly swapped the remains found under the station with the body of another person who died of natural causes. When the DNA results return, they do not match Shane, leaving the police with no legal grounds to hold him. Once again, Harishchandra’s deep understanding of storytelling and "plot twists" allows him to shield his family, eventually leading to a final, somber closure where he helps Shane’s parents find peace without surrendering his family to the law.

== Cast ==
- Bimal Jayakody as Harishchandra
- Dilhani Ekanayake as Rani Harishchandra
- Thisuri Yuwanika as Achini Harishchandra
- Vinumi Vansadhi as Sachini Harishchandra
- Kusum Renu as Vishaka Samaranayake
- Douglas Ranasinghe as Upali Samaranayake
- Kumara Thirimadura as Constable Wimal
- Ashan Dias as Senior D.I.G Vishwa Kariyawasam
- Dinakshie Priyasad as S.I Waruni Munasinghe, disguised police officer
- Ananda Athukorala as Jinadasa, Police OIC
- Sanath Gunathilake as Mangala Widanapathirana, the screenwriter
- Nalin Lusena as Darshan Gajendran
- Kalana Gunasekara as Kelum, Security officer
- Buddhadasa Vithanarachchi as Court judge
- Malcolm Machado as Narada, cemetery keeper
- Heshan Mallawa as Police officer
- Mauli Fernando as S.I. Kalana Siriwadena, disguised police officer
- Harshika Rathnayake as Nuwani, Gajendra's wife
- Thilakshini Rathnayake as Harischandra's Lawyer
- Danu Innasithamby as Manoj
- Nirukshan Ekanayake as Palitha, Harischandra's secretary
- Chami Senanayake as Mahesh

== Production ==
The sequel was officially announced on 28 May 2025 by MTV Channel. Muhurath ceremony was commenced at the Stein Studios, Ratmalana. Aruna Jayawardene was selected to direct the film, taking over from the original director, the late Cheyyar Ravi. Due to the passing of lead actor Jackson Anthony, the production team cast Bimal Jayakody to portray the central character of Harishchandra.

== Box office ==
The film received positive reviews from critics. Dharmayuddhaya 2 has become the fastest film in Sri Lankan cinema history to cross the 100 million mark, which took only 10 days to reach the milestone. After 17 days of screening, the film became the fastest film in Sri Lankan cinema history to cross the 200 million mark and later became the fastest film in Sri Lankan cinema history to cross the 300 million mark in 26 days.

The film crossed the 400 million mark in 36 days, 500 million mark in 50 days, 600 million mark in 100 days becoming the first Sri Lankan film to reach the milestone only with local ticket market. After Screened more than 120 days the film earned 630.5 million lkr and became the second highest grossing Sri Lankan film of all time.
