= Harichandra (1998 film) =

- DVD cover
- Directed by: Cheyyar Ravi
- Screenplay by: Cheyyar Ravi; G. Thyagarajan; K. Jeevakumaaran
- Story by: K. Jeevakumaaran
- Produced by: G. Thyagarajan; G. Saravanan
- Starring: Karthik; Meena
- Cinematography: Ravi Yadav
- Edited by: G. R. Anilmalnad
- Music by: Agosh
- Production company: Sathya Jyothi Films
- Release date: 15 May 1998
- Running time: 150 minutes
- Country: India
- Language: Tamil

Harichandra is a 1998 Indian Tamil-language comedy film directed by Cheyyar Ravi. The film stars Karthik and Meena, while Priya Raman, Chinni Jayanth, Vivek, Delhi Ganesh, and Sathyapriya play supporting roles. It was released on 15 May 1998. The film was remade in Telugu as Harischandra (1999).

== Plot ==
Harichandra aka Hari is an ad filmmaker that has a habit of telling lies for the good of the people around him, but has no intent to cheat. Only his three friends know this. Hari has gained a good name in the society.

Hari meets a school principal Nandhini in a shooting spot, who happens to be a relative of his friend. Later, he falls in love with her, hides his true nature and lies to impress her.

Unfortunately for him, Nandhini was clever enough to identify all his lies, but no matter what, they still reunite after every quarrel and fight. Quarrels and fights lasted until their wedding moment.

Eventually in the end, everyone knew that even though Hari lies and cheats people, he is still a good human being. Thus, Hari and Nandhini got married and lived happily.

== Cast ==
- Karthik as Harichandran
- Meena as Nandhini
- Priya Raman as Chitra
- Chinni Jayanth as Sundaram
- Vivek as Gopal
- Vaiyapuri as Muthu
- Delhi Ganesh as Harichandra's father
- Sathyapriya as Harichandra's mother
- Anand as Joseph Fernandez
- Thalaivasal Vijay as Raghu, Chitra's brother
- Janagaraj as Doctor
- Vinu Chakravarthy as Anthony
- Thyagu as General Manager
- Kaka Radhakrishnan as Raghu and Chitra's grandfather
- Mohan Raman as Nandhini's father
- Vichithra guest appearance in song "Kadhal Enbadhu"
- Kavithalaya Krishnan
- T. S. Raghavendra as fake church priest
- R. S. Shivaji as marriage broker
- Anusha as Harichandran's neighbour
- K. R. Vatsala as Nandhini's mother
- Oru Viral Krishna Rao as Ramayya
- Kovai Senthil as temple priest

Uncredited

- Ganeshkar as hotel staff member
- Meera Krishnan as Sun TV newsreader
- Dhadi Balaji as office staff member
- Laxmi Rattan as Victor Banerjee
- R. Anandh as music director in recording

== Production ==
The film's title is an ironic reference to Harishchandra, a legendary king known for being truthful. Two of the songs were shot at Switzerland. The song "Mundhanai Selai" was shot at locations including Switzerland, Geneva, and London. The film's producer Thyagarajan co-wrote the screenplay with Cheyyar Ravi.

== Soundtrack ==
The music is composed by the band Agosh.

Track listing
No.	Title	Lyrics	Singer(s)	Length
1.	"Harichandran Varraan"	Vaasan	Gopal Rao, Karthik
2.	"Mundhaanai Saelai"	Arivumathi	Mano, K. S. Chithra
3.	"Kaadhal Enbadhu"	Piraisoodan	Swarnalatha
4.	"Naadodi Paattu Paada"	Ravishankar	S. P. Balasubrahmanyam
5.	"Enna Idhu Kanavaa"	Palani Bharathi	Mano, Sujatha

== Reception ==
D. S. Ramanujam of The Hindu praised Ravi's direction and said Karthik, "with his inimitable style of halting delivery, makes fine use of the part, his evasive tactics and lies being rich like his costume". Ji of Kalki praised Karthik's performance, climax humour, songs but panned the background score and felt the director who tried to surprise by hinting towards a different end falls into routine logicless pit. K. N. Vijiyan of New Straits Times praised Karthik's performance, Ravi's direction, the cinematography and art direction.
