= Annakodiyum Aindhu Pengalum =

Indian Tamil-language soap opera

- அன்னக்கொடியும் ஐந்து பெண்களும்
- Genre: Soap opera
- Written by: R. Selvaraj
- Screenplay by: Baba Kendy
- Directed by: Cheyyar Ravi
- Creative director: T.G. Thiyagarayan
- Starring: Shruthi Raj; Vibhu Raman; Venkat Ranganathan; Sridevi Ashok; Kavitha Solairajan; Mahalakshmi; Lakshmi; Sathish; Deepa Nethran
- Country of origin: India
- Original language: Tamil
- No. of seasons: 2
- No. of episodes: 460

Production
- Producers: T.T.G. Thiyagarayasaravanan; Selvi Thiyagarayan
- Camera setup: Multi-camera
- Running time: approx. 20-22 minutes per episode
- Production company: Sathya Jyothi Films

Original release
- Network: Zee Tamil
- Release: 23 February 2015 – 16 December 2016

Annakodiyum Aindhu Pengalum (Tamil: அன்னக்கொடியும் ஐந்து பெண்களும்) is a 2015 Tamil soap opera that aired on Zee Tamil. The show is set to launch on 23 February 2015 and 16 December 2016 airs Monday through Friday 7:00PM IST. Starting from Monday 27 December 2016, the show was shifted to 10:00PM IST for 460 episodes.

Starring Thendral and Office Serial Fame Shruthi Raj acting Female lead role. Story of the protagonist and her five sisters who come to Tamil Nadu in search of their father from Kerala and how their life takes turns there after The show directed by Cheyyar Ravi.

== Plot ==
Annakodiyum Ainthu Pengalum is an aspiring story of Annakodi and her five daughters. Gauri, the eldest daughter of Annakodi and Muthupandi is in search for an identity for her mother, herself and siblings as her mother being the second wife of Muthupandi is ill-treated by people around her, in spite of her step mother Pandiamma supporting them. How Gowri, a lawyer by profession tackles all the hurdles is captured as an interesting story. Gowri's role model in life is Uma Maheshwari, the leading lawyer in the town. Destiny lands her as the daughter-in-law of Uma Maheshwari where she faces threat to practice her profession. How she takes over her role model and fights all injustice forms the rest of the story.

== Cast ==
- Sathish as Muthupandi, Gowri, Kavitha, Manohari, Shankari & Eshwari's father
- Deepa as Pandiamma, Muthupandi's 1st wife
- Lakshmi / Kavitha as Annakodi, Muthupandi's 2nd wife
- Vibhu Raman as Siddarth
- Shruthi Raj as Advocate Gowri Siddarth
- Venkat as Vel Murugan
- Sridevi Ashok as police inspector, Manohari
- Dharish Jayaseelan as Dass (Shankari's husband)
- Bhagya as Shankari Dass
- Mahalakshmi as Kavitha
- Guhan Shanmugham as Thangadurai
- Veena Venkatesh as Advocate Uma Maheswari
- Akhila as Kanchana Thangadurai
- Sherin Thaha as Leelavathi
- Sivan Sreenivasan as Shenbagapandi, Muthupandi's elder brother
- Srividhya Shankar as Shenbagapandi's wife
- Veera as Kanchana's father
- Sasi Anand as Kanchana's uncle
