= Nadu Center =

- Genre: Coming-of-age; Sports drama
- Created by: Naru Narayanan; Mahaakerthi Aravindraj
- Written by: Naru Narayanan; Mahaakerthi Aravindraj; Nirmal K. Rajendran
- Directed by: Naru Narayanan
- Starring: SK Surya; Sarah Black; Surya Sethupathi; Terance Patrick Evers; Mukesh MK; Dominic Donald; Yashwanth; Sahana Sundar; Madhu Vasanth; Arthi Ashwin; Kishore; Shivani Shukla; Asha Sharath; M. Sasikumar; Regena Cassandrra; Kalaiyarasan
- Composers: Songs: Vishal Chandrashekhar; Score: Rajkumar Chandrasekaran
- Country of origin: India
- Original language: Tamil
- No. of seasons: 1
- No. of episodes: 17

Production
- Producers: Senthil Veeraasamy; Arabbhi Athreya; Avinaash Hariharan
- Cinematography: Hestin Jose Joseph
- Editor: K. J. Venkatramanan
- Running time: 22-25 minutes
- Production company: Aqua Bulls Content

Original release
- Network: JioHotstar
- Release: 20 November – 24 December 2025

Nadu Center (transl. Mid Center) is a 2025 Indian Tamil-language coming-of-age sports drama television series created by Naru Narayanan and Mahaakerthi Aravindraj for JioHotstar. The series directed by Naru Narayanan and produced by Senthil Veeraasamy, Arabbhi Athreya and Avinaash Hariharan under the banner of Aqua Bulls Content.

It follows a story of teenage school students who are struggling to bloom in their lives and the challenges faced by the basketball club at their school. The series stars SK Surya, Sarah Black, Surya Sethupathi, Terance Patrick Evers, Mukesh MK, Dominic Donald, Yashwanth, Sahana Sundar, Madhu Vasanth, Arthi Ashwin, Kishore, Shivani Shukla, Asha Sharath, M. Sasikumar, Regena Cassandrra and Kalaiyarasan. It premiered on JioHotstar on 20 November 2025 and consists of 17 episodes.

== Synopsis ==
Pradeep Kadhirchelvan "PK" is a 17-year-old national-level basketball player expelled from an elite school for alleged misconduct. Transferred to a notorious institution plagued by violence and indiscipline, PK struggles to fit in until the vice principal sees in him the potential to lead change. Tasked with building a basketball team out of the school's most unruly students, PK begins an unexpected journey of leadership and self-discovery — fighting prejudice, earning trust, and reviving the school's lost pride.

== Cast ==
- SK Surya as Pradeep Kadhirchelvan "PK"
- Surya Sethupathi as Chandru
- Mukesh MK as Kaali Das Rajendran
- Shivam as Abel
- Dominic Donald as Jeyanth
- Sarah Black as Fara
- Yashwanth as Nandha
- Asha Sharath as Vice-principal Parvathi "VP"
- Elango Kumanan as Kadhirchelvan, PK's father
- Sujatha Babu as PK's mother
- K. J. Venkatramanan as PK's brother
- Terance Patrick Evers as Guru
- Kishore as Thadchanamoorthy "Thachi"
- Jeeva Balachandran as Kuldeep
- M. Sasikumar as Coach Selva
- Regena Cassandrra as herself and also as Fara in GCU (Guru Cinematic Universe)
- Kalaiyarasan as Vettri
- Delhi Ganesh as Thachi's grandfather
- Vichu Vishwanath as SPI school's PE teacher
- Janaki Sabesh as Thachi's mother
- Mime Gopi as Vettri's father
- P. L. Thenappan as Jeyanth's father
- R. Aravindraj as Kaali friend's dad
- Ilavarasu as Rajendran.D, Kaali's father
- Aruldoss as Fara's uncle
- Lizzie Antony as Fara's aunty
- Srilekha Rajendran as Fara's grandmother
- Munnar Ramesh as Nagarjun Master, KB school's PE teacher
- Ramachandran Durairaj as Chandru and Shalini's father
- Sahana Sundar as Jade
- V.T. Madhu Vasanth as Cheetah
- Arthi Ashwin as Nisha
- Tara Amala Joseph as Pallavi Teacher "French Teacher"
- Nandagopal MK as Vasu sir
- Tanisha Thilakesh as Chanchal
- Jayakumar Janakiraman as KB's chairman
- Keerthana as Bhagyalakshmi, Kaali's mother
- Harris Moosa as Shaahid, Fara's father
- Riya Thiyagarajan as Smitha
- Deepika as Sanjana
- Priya Deivanayakam as Swetha
- Vetri as Shaahid
- Gayathri Saba as Archana
- Jenson Dhivakar as Canteen Staff
- Pradeep K.Vijayan as Canteen Staff
- Magalakshmi Sudarsanan as Shalini, Chandru's sister

== Episodes ==
Series	Episodes	Originally released	
Series	Episodes	First released	Last released
1	17	20 November 2025	24 December 2025

Season	Episode	Title	Directed by	Written by	Original release date
1	1	"Watch and Learn"	Naru Narayanan	Naru Narayanan; Mahaakerthi Aravindraj; Nirmal K. Rajendran	20 November 2025
1	2	"You Should Play Again"	Naru Narayanan	Naru Narayanan; Mahaakerthi Aravindraj; Nirmal K. Rajendran	20 November 2025
1	3	"School Full of Cuckoos"	Naru Narayanan	Naru Narayanan; Mahaakerthi Aravindraj; Nirmal K. Rajendran	20 November 2025
1	4	"You Dunnit"	Naru Narayanan	Naru Narayanan; Mahaakerthi Aravindraj; Nirmal K. Rajendran	27 November 2025
1	5	"Final Warning!"	Naru Narayanan	Naru Narayanan; Mahaakerthi Aravindraj; Nirmal K. Rajendran	27 November 2025
1	6	"Coffee..?"	Naru Narayanan	Naru Narayanan; Mahaakerthi Aravindraj; Nirmal K. Rajendran	27 November 2025
1	7	"Break-up and Basketball"	Naru Narayanan	Naru Narayanan; Mahaakerthi Aravindraj; Nirmal K. Rajendran	3 December 2025
1	8	"If Only Words Meant Something"	Naru Narayanan	Naru Narayanan; Mahaakerthi Aravindraj; Nirmal K. Rajendran	3 December 2025
1	9	"Wanna Play?"	Naru Narayanan	Naru Narayanan; Mahaakerthi Aravindraj; Nirmal K. Rajendran	3 December 2025
1	10	"The Cultural Fest"	Naru Narayanan	Naru Narayanan; Mahaakerthi Aravindraj; Nirmal K. Rajendran	10 December 2025
1	11	"Knock out"	Naru Narayanan	Naru Narayanan; Mahaakerthi Aravindraj; Nirmal K. Rajendran	10 December 2025
1	12	"Written and Directed by Guru"	Naru Narayanan	Naru Narayanan; Mahaakerthi Aravindraj; Nirmal K. Rajendran	10 December 2025
1	13	"Never Quit Basketball"	Naru Narayanan	Naru Narayanan; Mahaakerthi Aravindraj; Nirmal K. Rajendran	17 December 2025
1	14	"Not in Sync"	Naru Narayanan	Naru Narayanan; Mahaakerthi Aravindraj; Nirmal K. Rajendran	17 December 2025
1	15	"A Days Time"	Naru Narayanan	Naru Narayanan; Mahaakerthi Aravindraj; Nirmal K. Rajendran	17 December 2025
1	16	"Lets Face It"	Naru Narayanan	Naru Narayanan; Mahaakerthi Aravindraj; Nirmal K. Rajendran	24 December 2025
1	17	"One Win!"	Naru Narayanan	Naru Narayanan; Mahaakerthi Aravindraj; Nirmal K. Rajendran	24 December 2025

== Production ==
=== Development ===
The series was developed as part of the Hotstar Specials lineup for JioHotstar as a long-form Tamil web series combining coming-of-age and sports drama.

=== Casting ===
Newcomer actors Surya SK, Sarah Black, Terrance, Mukesh, Yashwanth, Sahana, Dom, Madhuvasanth, Arti, Kishore, Jeeva, Nandagopal MK, Tara Amala Joseph, and Shivam, play the lead roles with actor Surya Sethupathi. Actor M. Sasikumar was cast as Coach Selva. This is his first role in a limited series. Actress Asha Sharath and Regena Cassandrra play the supporting role.

=== Release ===
The first trailer was released by actor M. Sasikumar on 14 November 2025, highlighting the series' blend of basketball and sports drama. The series was released on 20 November 2025 in Tamil.
