= Vidhushi Uththara =

Sri Lankan actress, voice artist and model

Vidhushi Uththara විදූෂි උත්තරා
- Born: Dabare Liyanage Vidhushi Uththara; 29 November 1991 (age 34); Colombo, Sri Lanka
- Education: Sangamiththa Balika Vidyalaya; Gothami Balika Vidyalaya
- Occupations: Actress, model, dubbing artist
- Years active: 2001 - 2022
- Spouse: Dr. Laknath Prasantha Rajasiri (m. 2013)
- Parents: Vipul Ariyathilaka Liyanage (father); Kumari Deepika Dharmapala (mother)
- Relatives: Priscilla Opatha (grandmother); Kusum Renu (aunt); Sriyantha Mendis (uncle)

Dabare Liyanage Vidhushi Uththara (born 29 November 1991), popularly known as Vidhushi Uththara, is an actress in Sri Lankan television and theater as well as a model and voice artist. Started as a child television presenter, she later became one of the popular actresses in the television with the serials Deveni Inima, Rajayogaya, Lansupathiniyo and Kusumasana Devi.

== Personal life ==
She was born on 29 November 1991 in Rajagiriya, Colombo as the second child of the family. Her father Vipul Ariyathilaka Liyanage is a mechanic who runs his own business 'Vipul enterprises'. Her mother Kumari Deepika Dharmapala is a housewife. Vidhushi has one elder sister, Dilini Rangana who is a journalist and editor. Her grandmother Priscilla Opatha was a renowned singer in the Gramophone era who became very popular with the song "Monawada Amme Akuru Jathiyak" sung with Kingsley Jayasekera.

Vidhushi started education at Sangamiththa Balika Vidyalaya, Colombo and later attended Gothami Balika Vidyalaya, Colombo. Then in 2012, she graduated with a degree at National Gem and Jewellery Authority, Colombo. Before starting an acting career, she worked as a jewelry designer at Aminra collection from 2012 to 2013.

Her aunt Kusum Renu is a popular actress active in cinema, television and theater in a career spanning more than four decades. Kusum Renu is married to fellow dramatist Sriyantha Mendis. Sriyantha has dominated theater, television and cinema since 1979 and received several awards for Best Actor in multiple award ceremonies.

She is married to Laknath Prasantha Rajasiri, a policeman. The wedding was celebrated on 24 October 2013.

== Career ==
In 2001, she joined with Sri Lanka Rupavahini Corporation "Athuru Mithuru" children's unit as a child announcer and continued to work until 2005. Then in 2005, she made her maiden television role in the serial Sathara Ima Gini as a child artist. Then in 2016, she participated in the screen test for the television serial Deiyange Rate with one of her friends. During the screen test, she acted with her friend to help her during the screening. Later she was selected for a supportive role in the serial. Meanwhile, in 2017, she appeared in the soap opera Deveni Inima directed by Saranga Mendis and played the role 'Malki'. She became very popular with the serial and she continued to play the role until 2018.

In 2018, she became one of the Top 5 Popular actresses at Raigam Tele'es. In 2019, she was nominated for the award for the Upcoming Actress for her role in the television serial Rajayogaya. In 2018, she played the main titular role in the television serial Kusumasana Devi which became very popular. Then in 2019, she acted in three television serials: Lansupathiniyo, Sanda Vimana and Aeya. She played the main antagonist role Rithu in Aeya teledrama. However, She quit Aeya teledrama in 2020 which replaced by Chathu Rajapaksha. She also performed in two stage plays Miringu Ma Ima directed by her sister and Hankithi Daha Thuna directed by Jayantha Chandrasiri.

Apart from serials, she also starred in several telefilms including: Magiya, Dharu Senehasa, Senehewanthaya, Moha, Sepalika, Guru Paduru, Piyawara and Dinuma. She also appeared in several commercials such as Commercial Bank, Riztbury Chocolates, Tiara Layer Cake, Vim Dish-wash soap, Milo, Munchee Chocolate Marie, Astra Butter, Clorgard Toothpaste, Sera coconut Milk, Comfort fabric liquid, Laojee Tea and Dettol soap.

Apart from acting, she is also a popular dubbing artist who rendered her voice to several international soap operas and serials including; Kiduru Kumariyo (Niksy), Chooty Dhuu (Mansi), Mini Pahana Obai (Minty), Vidya Pawula (Alice), Sakwala Kumariyo (Madison), Panditha Rama (Kali Amma), Nihada Dhoni (Mohana), Hamu Wemu Aye Sansare (Pooja), Vishwa Charika and Sihinayaka Seya (Zoya).

== Television serials ==
Year	Film	Role	Ref.
2005	Sathara Ima Gini	Malithi	
2016	Deiyange Rate	Himansa	
2017	Deveni Inima	Malki	
2017	Rajayogaya	Udari	
2017	Ahimi	Janaki	
2018	Kusumasana Devi	Dona Kathirina	
2018	Sillara Samanallu	Harini	
2018	Rakungira	Priyanvada	
2019	Sanda Vimana	Vindya	
2019	Lansupathiniyo	Kathy	
2020	Kiss Season 1	Methma	
2019-2020	Aeya	Rithu	

== Music video appearances ==
- Bambarindu
- Palu Sitha Langa
- Sanasum Hade
- Hitha Mage
- Kiss Theme Song
- Madhu
