= Mehfil (film) =

- Theatrical release poster
- Directed by: Jayaraj
- Written by: Jayaraj
- Produced by: Manoj Govindan
- Starring: Mukesh; Unni Mukundan; Asha Sharath; Manoj K. Jayan
- Cinematography: Rahul Deep
- Edited by: Vipin Mannoor
- Music by: Deepankuran Kaithapram
- Production company: Widescreen Media Productions
- Release date: 8 August 2025
- Country: India
- Language: Malayalam

Mehfil is a 2025 Indian Malayalam-language musical drama film written and directed by Jayaraj. It is based on the life of music enthusiast Mullassery Raju and his wife, told in a span of a mehfil night. The film stars Mukesh, Unni Mukundan, Asha Sharath and Manoj K. Jayan.

The film released on 8 August 2025.

== Plot ==
Set in a culturally rich feudal household, the film follows a retired landlord (Mukesh) who is deeply rooted in classical music and poetry. As he strives to preserve the dying tradition of mehfil gatherings, the story interweaves the emotional journey of a new generation of artists, including a passionate young musician (Unni Mukundan).

== Cast ==
- Mukesh as Mullassery Raju
- Unni Mukundan as Vijay Bhaskar
- Asha Sharath as Devi
- Manoj K. Jayan as Sethu
- Renji Panicker as Dr. Shakeel
- Siddharth Menon as Anoop
- Ramesh Narayan
- Meenakshi Raveendran as Merlin
- Vyshnavi as Naani
- Kailash as Rahul
- Aswathlal as Abdu
- Krishna Chandran
- Manoj Govindan as Sura
- Shibu Nair
- Nikhil Renjipanicker
- Sabitha Jayaraj as Latha
- Anil Anto
- Akhila Anand as Dr. Anitha
- G. Venugopal as Suresh

== Production ==
The film completed production in late 2022. The shooting locations of the film include heritage homes and culturally rich interiors of Kerala.

== Music ==
The soundtrack of Mehfil is composed by Kaithapram Viswanathan and Deepankuran Kaithapram, with lyrics by Kaithapram Damodaran Namboothiri. The film features several classical tracks and poetic tributes.

=== Soundtrack ===
- "Mehfil Poothoru Ravum"
- "Raagathin Raavil"
- "Tribute to Mullassery Rajagopal"

== Release ==
=== Theatrical ===
The first-look poster of Mehfil was released in July 2025 and received appreciation for its elegant presentation. The trailer was released on 3 August 2025.

The film was theatrical released on 8 August 2025.

=== Home media ===
Mehfil was released digitally through Sun NXT on 10 October 2025.
