= Asha Sharath =

Indian actress and classical dancer

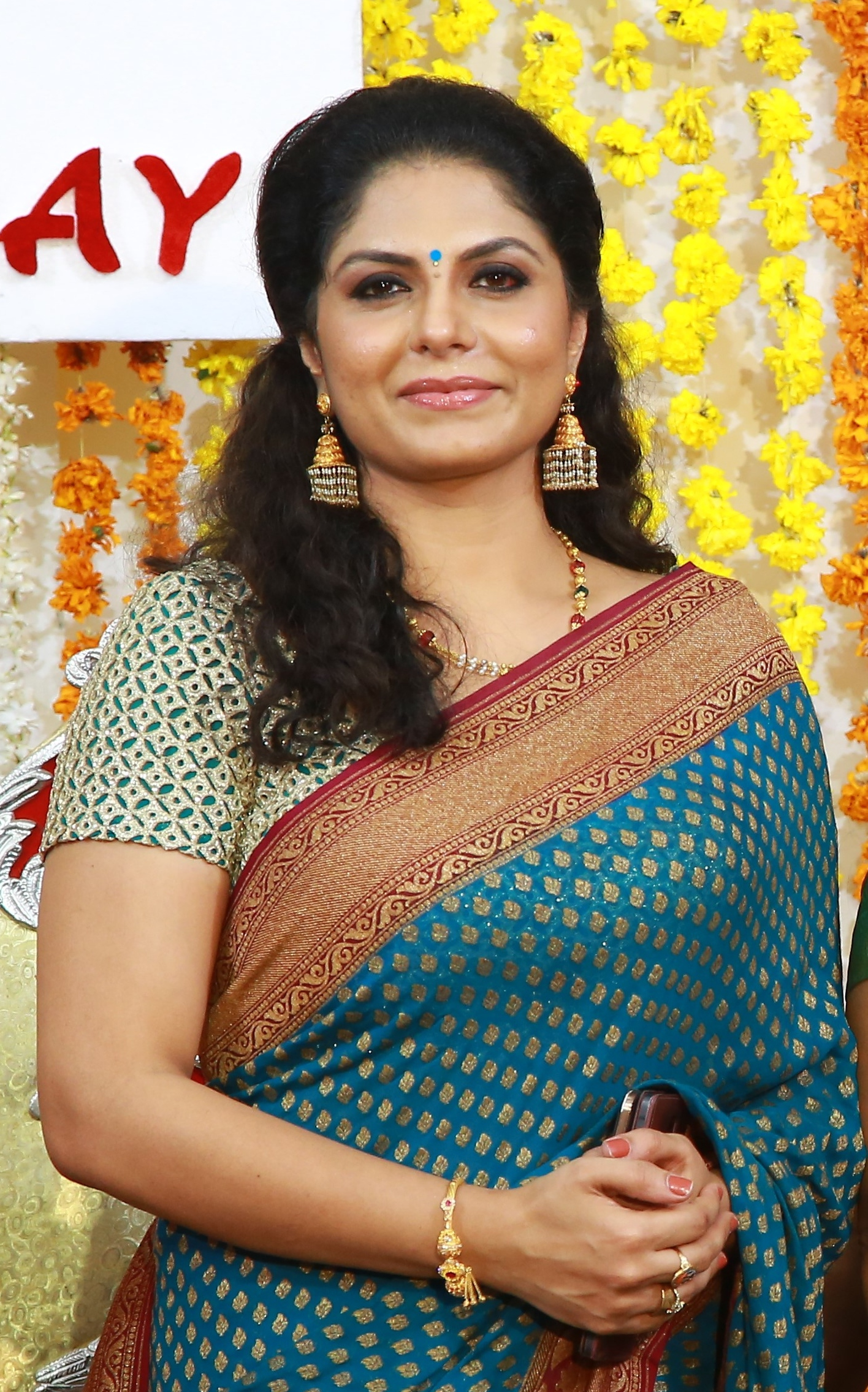
- Asha Sharath in 2015
- Born: Perumbavoor, Kerala, India
- Education: Sree Sankara College, Kalady
- Occupations: Actor; classical dancer
- Years active: 1996–present
- Spouse: T. V. Sharath
- Children: 2
- Website: ashasharath.com

Asha Sharath is an Indian actress and classical dancer, who predominantly works in Malayalam films and television, in addition to a few Tamil, Kannada and Telugu films. She is best known for her role as a police officer in the Drishyam film series.

== Career ==
Asha Sharath appeared in many television serials including Jathaka Kathakal and Mikhayelinte Santhathikal, her most notable being the soap opera Kumkumapoovu. Her first feature film was the Friday (2012). Her role as Geetha Prabhakar in Drishyam (2013) was her breakthrough performance.

== Filmography ==
Key
†	Denotes films that have not yet been released

=== Malayalam films ===
Year	Title	Role	Notes
2012	Friday	Parvathy	
2012	Karmayodha	Deepa	
2012	Ardhanaari	Balu Menan's wife	
2013	Buddy	Meenakshi	
2013	Zachariayude Garbhinikal	Susan	
2013	Drishyam	Geetha Prabhakar	
2014	Varsham	Nandini	
2014	Angels	Haritha Menon	
2016	Pavada	Sicily Varghese	
2016	King Liar	Devika Varma	
2016	Anuraga Karikkin Vellam	Suma	
2016	Aanandam	Dia's Mother	Photo presence only
2017	Munthirivallikal Thalirkkumbol	Indulekha	
2017	1971: Beyond Borders	Parvathy Sahadevan	
2017	Viswasapoorvam Mansoor	Fathibi	
2017	Sunday Holiday	Dr. Sreedhanya	
2017	Pullikkaran Staraa	Manjari Anthony	
2018	Bhayanakam	Gowri Kunjamma	
2018	Drama	Rekha	
2019	Evidey	Jessy	
2019	Subharathri	Suhara	
2019	Thelivu	Gowri	
2020	Janaki	Janki/Herself	Short film
2021	Drishyam 2	Geetha Prabhakar	
2022	CBI 5: The Brain	Adv. Prathibha Satyadas	
2022	Paappan	Dr. Sherly/Bennitta Issac	
2022	Peace	Jalaja	
2022	Khedda	Savitha	
2023	Antony	Jessy	
2025	Mehfil	Lakshmi Rajagopal	
2026	Ashakal Aayiram	Asha	
2026	Drishyam 3	Geetha Prabhakar	

=== Other language films ===
Year	Title	Role	Language	Notes
2014	Drishya	IG Roopa Chandrasekhar	Kannada	Remake of Drishyam
2015	Papanasam	IG Geetha Prabhakar	Tamil	Remake of Drishyam
2015	Thoongaa Vanam	Dr. Sujatha	Tamil	Bilingual film
2015	Cheekati Rajyam	Dr. Sujatha	Telugu	Bilingual film
2018	Bhaagamathie	Vaishnavi Natarajan	Telugu	Bilingual film
2018	Bhaagamathie	Vaishnavi Natarajan	Tamil	Bilingual film
2021	Drishya 2	Roopa Chandrasekhar	Kannada	Remake of Drishyam 2
2022	Anbarivu	Lakshmi	Tamil	
2026	My Lord	Central Minister Sujatha Mohan	Tamil	
2026	Good News †	TBA	Tamil	

=== Web series ===
Year	Title	Role	Language	Platform	Notes
2025	Nadu Center	Parvathi "VP"	Tamil	JioHotstar	

=== Television ===
Year	Title	Role	Channel
2011-2014	Kumkumapoovu	Jayanthi Prabhakaran	Asianet
2015	Sell Me the Answer	Contestant	Asianet
2019	Top Singer	Judge	Flowers TV
2020-2021	Super 4	Judge	Mazhavil Manorama
2020	Ammayariyathe	Herself	Asianet
2022-2023	Dancing Stars	Judge	Asianet
2023	Start Music season 5	Guest	Asianet
2023-2024	Musical Wife	Judge	Flowers TV
2025	Enkile Ennodu Para	Guest	Asianet

== Awards ==
=== Kerala Film Critics Association Awards ===
- 2014: Best Actress for Varsham

=== Filmfare Awards South ===
- 2014: Best Supporting Actress for Drishyam
- 2016: Best Supporting Actress for Anuraga Karikkin Vellam
