= Dharma Seelan =

- Poster
- Directed by: Cheyyar Ravi
- Screenplay by: Cheyyar Ravi
- Story by: Agasthiya Vasahan
- Produced by: V. Mohan; V. Natarajan
- Starring: Prabhu; Khushbu; Napoleon; Geetha; Salim Ghouse
- Cinematography: Thangar Bachan
- Edited by: B.S. Mahendran
- Music by: Ilaiyaraaja
- Production company: Anandhi Films
- Release date: 16 July 1993
- Country: India
- Language: Tamil

Dharma Seelan is a 1993 Indian Tamil-language film directed by Cheyyar Ravi in his debut. The film stars Prabhu in dual roles as father and son and Khushbu, whilst Napoleon, Geetha and Salim Ghouse play supporting roles. It was released on 16 July 1993.

== Plot ==
Thamizh Selvan, an orphan who works in a hospital, tries to discover the truth of his parentage. Though the head of his orphanage claims that a recently deceased nun was his mother, others deny it. Thamizh teams up with a reporter Durga, they meet at the nun's wake, and they two work to unearth the facts.

== Cast ==
- Prabhu as SP Dharma Seelan and Thamizh Selvan
- Khushbu as Durga
- Napoleon as Vaappa
- Geetha as Parvathi
- Manorama as Mother Mary
- Goundamani as Aarusamy
- Senthil as Dindigul Sahayam
- Salim Ghouse as Pradeep Chakravarthi
- Ishari Ganesh
- Sathyapriya as a Nun

== Soundtrack ==
The music composed by Ilaiyaraaja.

Track listing
No.	Title	Lyrics	Singer(s)	Length
1.	"Kinnaaram Kinnaaram"	R. V. Udayakumar	S. P. Balasubrahmanyam	4:58
2.	"Engumulla Allah"	Gangai Amaran	"Nagore" E.M. Hanifa, S. P. Balasubrahmanyam	5:09
3.	"Thendral Varum"	Vaali	Arunmozhi, Minmini	4:52
4.	"Iruppathai Maranthu"	Pulamaipithan	Mano	3:39
5.	"Anbe Vaa"	Vaali	Mano, Swarnalatha	4:50
6.	"Aiya Ithai Meiya"	Vaali	Sunandha	3:31
7.	"Aada Sonnaal"	Pulamaipithan	K. S. Chitra	5:11
Total length:				32:10

== Reception ==
Malini Mannath of The Indian Express wrote, "A gripping screenplay, taut narration and some fine performances make Dharmaseelan a film worth watching".
