= Ganagandharvan =

- Directed by: Ramesh Pisharody
- Written by: Ramesh Pisharody; Hari P. Nair
- Produced by: Anto Joseph; Shankar Raj R.; Sreelakshmi R.; Soumya Ramesh
- Starring: Mammootty; Santhi Mayadevi; Manoj K Jayan; Suresh Krishna
- Cinematography: Alagappan N.
- Edited by: Lijo Paul
- Music by: Deepak Dev
- Production companies: Anto Joseph Film Company; Ichais Productions; Ramesh Pisharody Entertainments
- Distributed by: Anto Joseph Film Company
- Release date: 27 September 2019
- Country: India
- Language: Malayalam

Ganagandharvan (transl. Celestial singer) is a 2019 Indian Malayalam-language musical comedy-drama film written and directed by Ramesh Pisharody. The film stars Mammootty, Santhi Mayadevi, Manoj K. Jayan, Siddique, and Suresh Krishna. The film was released on 27 September 2019, and received mixed reviews from critics.

== Synopsis ==
Kalasadhan Ullas is a ganamela singer who has worked for the popular ganamela troupe Kalasadhan for the past 26 years. His family consists of his wife Mini and daughter Sowmya. However, Ullas's life takes a different turn after a girl named Sandra enters his life for a nefarious purpose. How he handles the following incidents forms the crux of the story.

== Cast ==
- Mammootty as Kalasadhan Ullas
- Vanditha Manoharan as Mini, Ullas's wife
- Athulya Chandra as Sandra Samson
- Santhi Mayadevi as Advocate Anamika
- Sithara as Family Court Magistrate, Ullas's ex-girlfriend
- Manoj K. Jayan as Kalasadhan Titto
- Suresh Krishna as Shyamaprasad
- Siddique as Advocate Manoj
- Mohan Jose as Jacob
- Maniyanpilla Raju as Kuttan
- Rafi as Samson
- Sneha Babu as Kalasadhan Dhanya
- Baiju Ezhupunna as Moorthi
- Mukesh as Aby
- Johny Antony as Prince
- Dharmajan Bolgatty as Rajan
- Devan as Sivadasan
- Ashokan as SI Santhosh Zacharia
- Innocent as Mulayidam Appukutta Panicker
- Salim Kumar as Rajaji
- Hareesh Perumanna as P C Joji
- Sadiq as Magistrate Sandeep
- Arya as Anchor Sanitha
- Kunchan as Balan
- Kottayam Nazeer as Binoy
- Sudheer Karamana as Prabhakaran
- Rajesh Sharma as Ranjan, Anamika's father
- Kochu Preman as Cherian, marriage broker
- Sunil Sukhada as Saju
- Kishore Varma as Sonu Madhav
- Kalabhavan Prajod as Suresh, Temple committee member
- Appa Haja as Ganeshan, Temple committee president
- Sindhu Varma as School Principal Lakshmi
- Chali Pala as Bahuleyan
- Shiney Sarah as Physics Teacher Elizabeth
- Binu Thrikkakkara as Praveen
- Anoop Menon as Yousuf (cameo appearance)
- Abu Salim as Prisoner Satheesh
- Sajan Palluruthy as Bank Manager Vikram
- Subeesh Sudhi as Ajayan
- Ramesh Kurumasserry as Temple Committee Man
- Sathi Premji as Santhakumari
- Siju Irumpanam as School Staff
- Kalabhavan Jayakumar as Temple Committee Man

== Production ==
Ramesh Pisharody announced his second directorial venture on 1 November 2018 by unveiling the title poster featuring Mammootty. It was screened in theatres alongside the Mohanlal-starrer Drama (2018). According to Pisharody, "The film is about the life of a senior singer. The character is influenced by some singers I know. It's not a fully serious story. You can expect some humour as well." Newcomer Vanditha was brought in to play one of the female leads.

Principal photography began in Kochi on 1 June 2019. Filming was completed on 22 July 2019.

== Soundtrack ==
Ganagandharvan

Soundtrack album by Deepak Dev
- Released: 2019
- Recorded: 2019
- Genre: Film soundtrack
- Language: Malayalam

The film's music was composed by Deepak Dev with lyrics written by Rafeeq Ahmed and Santhosh Varma.

Track No.	Title	Singer(s)
01	"Aalum Kolum"	K. S. Harishankar, Jeenu Nazeer
02	"Kalayude Keli"	Shyam Prasad
03	"Undh Undh"	Zia Ul Haq
04	"Veedhiyil"	Unni Menon

== Release ==
The film was released on 27 September 2019.

=== Box office ===
In the UAE, it grossed $125,902 in the opening weekend and $172,068 in three weeks. It grossed $18,710 (₹13.32 lakh) in the US in three weeks. The film ended as a financial succuss, with a worldwide gross of ₹18.5 crore of which the final global theatrical share is estimated to be ₹9.75 crore with recovery more than 20 percent.

== Reception ==
The Times of India rated the film 3.5 out of 5 and wrote, "The strength of Ganagandharvan though is the acting and script. While Pisharody has resorted to straightforward, old school storytelling, he has done it with panache, proving that a good script does not need any gimmick to entertain the audience."

Manorama Online gave 3 out of 5 and wrote, "Director Ramesh Pisharody has successfully presented a small yet relevant subject without making the audience feel tedious or irksome. This movie is sure to cater to the interests of all kinds of audience. Sify rated the film 2 out of 5, described the film "average" and wrote "there is a fine idea here that is worth a story, but the way the script has been written and packaged makes this one a rather dull affair".

The News Minute critic rated 1.5 out of 5 stars and said "Ganagandharvan tries too hard with badly written comedy. Except the occasional wisecrack or a reference to an old movie (the scene with Karaman Sudheer), the film is largely not amusing".

Anna M. M. Vetticad of Firstpost rated 0.25 out of 5 and wrote "Pisharody's failure lies not only in his status-quoist, antagonistic ideology, but in his inability to tell a story well" and heavily criticized the anti-feministic writing.

Manoj Kumar R. of The Indian Express rated zero out of five stars and said the film "has a skeleton of a story to tell", "it is unclear why Mammootty would do such an in-your-face, one tone and biased film that neither understands men's right activism or the plight of men that fall into the trap of some evil women".

S. R. Praveen of The Hindu wrote "The whole appearance, aesthetics and structure of the movie harks back to a time gone by in Malayalam cinema. In that sense, the movie is almost like the titular character Ganagandharvan, who has become irrelevant, but doesn't know ".
