= Agosh =

Indian band

- Genres: Pop; punk
- Years active: 1994–2000s
- Past members: R. Anandh; Gopal Rao; Shaleen Sharma

Agosh was an Indian pop-punk band, consisting of R. Anandh, Gopal Rao, and Shaleen Sharma. Formed in 1994, they are considered India's first significant pop-punk band. The band dissolved in the 2000s, with all three members pursuing solo careers.

== Career ==
Anandh, a Chennai-based mathematics graduate and veena player, joined Prasad Media as a composer in the early 1990s till the studio caught on fire. He had worked as a composer for Malayalam and Tamil films. He started a studio called Aqua Regia (named after the chemical substance) with Gopal Rao, a Carnatic singer whom he met at Prasad Media. After Anandh's college mate Shaleen Sharma joined, the band Agosh was formed in 1994 with Anandh playing the guitar, Rao as the lead singer, and Sharma playing drums. The name Agosh, which translates to "Embrace", is also a portmanteau of the members' first names Anandh, Gopal and Shaleen. Anandh, Rao, and Sharma studied at IIT Roorkee with the latter two being mechanical engineers. Apart from playing the drums (tabla), Sharma was a Hindustani classical vocalist.

Agosh composed ad jingles for Fanta, Pepsi, Pond's, and for a Nestlé Munch advertisement. They also composed the song "O Yaara Re" for Come On India, a music compilation for the 1999 Cricket World Cup. In 1998, they composed for their first Hindi film Zor, which was known for the song "Main Kudi Anjai Hoon". Later that same year, their album Americana was released. The song "Pretty fly for a white guy" from the album was a hit and was aired on MTV and Channel V. They also did music for Radio City. They worked on the album Paisa in 2002, which was released under the label of Z Records. In a music review of the album, a critic wrote, "all the songs in Paisa are of even quality – melodious and humable. This album is "'paisa vasool'".

After the trio dissolved, Anandh went on to compose ad jingles for Limca, Motorola, Nokia, Paper Boat, Samsung, and Sprite; Rao continued as a Chennai-based singer and Sharma moved to Mumbai. Anandh composed for the Hindi film Lafangey Parindey (2010), which was directed by ad filmmaker Pradeep Sarkar. Anandh collaborated with Sarkar for advertisements for around a year. The songs were predominantly well received by critics.

== Discography ==
=== As composer ===
Agosh

- Zor (1998)
- Harichandra (1998)
- Americana (1998)
- Harischandra (1999)
- Come On India (1999)
- Paisa (2002)

R. Anandh's solo career

- Nirnayam (1995)
- Mazhayethum Munpe (1995)
- Siragugal Murivathillai
- Sakthi (1997)
- Kodiesvaran (1999)
- Ishaan: Sapno Ko Awaaz De (2010–2011)
- Lafangey Parindey (2010)

=== As playback singer ===
Gopal Rao

- Dilruba – Priyam (1996)
- Achu Vellame – Sakthi (1997)
- Love Attack – Ratchagan (1997)
- Hello Maruthi – Priyamudan (1998)
- Akkuthe – Nilaave Vaa (1998)
- Noorandukku – Thayin Manikodi (1998)
- Vannakili – Uyirodu Uyiraga (1998)
- Yenna Yenna – Chinna Raja (1999)
- Shape Chusi – Raja (1999) (Telugu)
- Hollywood Mudhal – Malabar Police (1999)
- Holi Holi – Vaanavil (2000)
- Naan Un Vaaname / Gunde Aadina – Krrish (2006; Tamil/Telugu dubbed versions)
- Thee Illai – Engeyum Kadhal (2011)
- Naagamalai – Aravaan (2012)
- Mannavane – Irandam Ulagam (2013)
- Noorukodi Pennil – Nijama Nizhala (2016)
- "Spirit of Chennai" (2016)

== Filmography ==
=== Shaleen Sharma ===
As lyricist

- Love Khichdi (2009)

As actor

- Morning Raga (2004)
