= Harischandra (1999 film) =

- Directed by: Thulasi Kumar
- Written by: Marudhuri Raja (dialogues)
- Screenplay by: Thulasi Kumar
- Story by: K. Jeevakumaaran
- Based on: Harichandra (Tamil)
- Produced by: Kovela Shantha Nagulapati; V. Raja Rajeshwari
- Starring: J. D. Chakravarthy; Raasi; Brahmanandam
- Cinematography: V. Srinivasa Reddy
- Edited by: V. Nagireddy
- Music by: Agosh
- Distributed by: Chekravarthy Productions
- Release date: 6 February 1999
- Country: India
- Language: Telugu

Harischandra is a 1999 Indian Telugu-language comedy film directed by Thulasi Kumar, starring J. D. Chakravarthy and Raasi. It is a remake of the Tamil film Harichandra (1998).

== Plot ==
Harischandra falls in love with Nandini at the first sight. In order to impress her, he lies to her that he does not drink, smoke or even eat non-vegetarian food. Soon he is caught red-handed and she, Nandini forgives him. Now enters another girl in the scene and Nandini assumes that Harishchandra has an affair with the girl. What will happen now?

== Cast ==
- J. D. Chakravarthy as Harischandra "Hari"
- Raasi as Nandini
- Ali
- Uttej
- Sivaji Raja
- Achyuth as Joseph
- Kota Srinivasa Rao
- AVS
- Tanikella Bharani
- Sudha
- Raghunatha Reddy
- Chitti Babu
- Sri Lakshmi
- Jenny
- Giridhar

== Soundtrack ==
The soundtrack was composed by Agosh and all lyrics were written by Sirivennela Seetharama Sastry. All the tunes from the original Tamil film are retained.

Track list
No.	Title	Singer(s)	Length
1.	"Daychey Dora"	Gopal Rao, Srini	4:57
2.	"Muvva Gopala"	Mano, K. S. Chithra	4:18
3.	"Premante Tenela"	Mano	5:25
4.	"Chinna Saayam Cheyava"	Mano, K. S. Chithra	5:14
5.	"Shadi Mubharak"	Gopal Rao, Swarnalatha	4:41
6.	"Vinudu Vinudu Antha"	Mano, Srini	5:42
Total length:			30:20
