= Neru (film) =

2023 Indian film

- Theatrical release poster
- Directed by: Jeethu Joseph
- Written by: Santhi Mayadevi; Jeethu Joseph
- Produced by: Antony Perumbavoor
- Starring: Anaswara Rajan; Mohanlal; Priyamani
- Cinematography: Satheesh Kurup
- Edited by: V. S. Vinayak
- Music by: Vishnu Shyam
- Production company: Aashirvad Cinemas
- Distributed by: Aashirvad Cinemas
- Release date: 21 December 2023
- Running time: 152 minutes
- Country: India
- Language: Malayalam
- Box office: ₹86 crore

Neru (pronounced [n̪eːɾə]; transl. Truth) is a 2023 Indian Malayalam-language courtroom drama film directed by Jeethu Joseph, who co-wrote the screenplay with Santhi Mayadevi. It was produced by Antony Perumbavoor under Aashirvad Cinemas. The film stars Anaswara Rajan,Mohanlal, Priyamani, Santhi Mayadevi, Siddique, Jagadish and Sankar Induchoodan.

The project was officially announced on 13 July 2023 under the working title Production No. 33, marking Joseph's fifth collaboration with Mohanlal with the title revealed on 12 August 2023. Principal photography took place between August and October 2023 in Thiruvananthapuram. The film's music was composed by Vishnu Shyam, while the cinematography and editing were handled by Satheesh Kurup and V. S. Vinayak.

Neru was theatrically released on 21 December 2023 and received positive reviews from critics who praised the cast performances (particularly Mohanlal, Rajan and Siddique), screenplay, and direction. Neru was noted as the comeback of Mohanlal after a series of unsuccessful films. The film was a commercial success grossing ₹86 crore worldwide, emerging as the second highest grossing Malayalam film of the year, and one of the highest-grossing Malayalam films of all time.

== Plot ==
Sara, a blind girl, is raped while she is alone at home. The police are unable to identify the offender due to Sara's blindness. Sara sculpts a statue of her rapist and based on the similarities, they arrest Michael, the son of Christopher Joseph, a Mumbai-based rich businessman. Michael's parents hire Advocate Rajashekhar, a renowned defense lawyer. Due to the Public Prosecutor unreliability, alongside Rajashekhar's twisting questioning tactics, Michael is granted bail, an unforeseen situation in a case like this. While Sara's family receive a settlement offer, they decide to fight the case.

CI Paul Varghese, the investigating officer, recommend Vijayamohan as the special public prosecutor, since no other lawyers will take up the job owing to Rajashekhar's influence. However, Vijayamohan no longer practices law due to an incident with Rajashekar a few years earlier: Vijayamohan was a junior to Rajashekar along with the latter's daughter Poornima, whom he got close to. Unhappy with their relationship, Rajashekar committed foul play that resulted in Vijayamohan getting debarred from practising law for 5 years. Initially reluctant to take up the case, Vijayamohan changes his mind after meeting Sara.

As the trial begins, Rajashekar uses many underhanded tactics such as character assassination of Sara's parents; her father, Muhammed, was married previously and left his first family for Sara's mother, Parveen. He tries to accuse Muhammed as the culprit by claiming that his story was fabricated as a way of trapping Michael and his family due to their wealth. Vijayamohan's key witness, Sara's neighbor and Michael's friend Vinod, whom Michael had stayed with on the day of the incident, changes their version of events, making the case hard to believe. Additionally, no semen sample was found due to Michael using a condom, leaving no scientific evidence or eyewitness to link him to Sara's assault, causing the case to be open-and-closed.

Rajashekar argues that at the time of the incident, Michael was with his friends at a party in a different location. CCTV footage proves his alibi, shocking Vijayamohan. However, Vijayamohan discovers that the footage was edited by Rajashekar and that Michael had left his phone in the car of his driver to make it seem like he was there. Vijayamohan proves in the court that the footage was faked and Rajashekar won many cases by presenting false evidences. The judge debars Rajashekar and Poornima takes the position as the defense lawyer. Media activists make the case go viral, leading to Michael's fiancée breaking off their engagement. Enraged, Michael shows up at Sara's house again and threatens her to withdraw the case.

Sara's family, however, continue to fight the case. Witnesses who claimed to be with Michael at the time of the crime are disproven by Vijayamohan due to errors in their story. Towards the end, Vijayamohan proves that Micheal's alibi was fake. He also reveals that Michael had committed rape before in Mumbai but the case went cold and he was not punished for it. Vijayamohan is still not convinced that this case can be won, as Sara has to prove beyond reasonable doubt that the accused is guilty and the current eyewitnesses cannot do so. The sculpture, which was Sara's way of ‘sight’, is discredited, due to her father also being a skilled sculptor and possibly its creator. Vijayamohan convinces the judge to allow Sara to create a sculpture based on a random person in the courtroom to prove her skills.

Despite Poornima's objections, the judge allows Sara to create a sculpture in the court as the court is creating a history. Poornima takes the chance to select the subject as Rajashekar, who tries unnerving Sara so that the sculpture is messed up. Ultimately, Sara manages to create a sculpture that is an exact replica of Rajashekar, which shocks everyone in the court. Michael is found guilty of rape and sentenced to life imprisonment as well as paying a fine. Vijayamohan regains his reputation. After winning the case, Sara touches Vijayamohan's face in gratitude, implying that she is going to make a sculpture and a replica of him. She walks out of the courtroom with no cover, refusing to be anonymous and gaining respect from the media around her (who refuse to film her) and the world.

== Cast ==
- Anaswara Rajan as Sara Mohammed, a blind sculptor artist
- Mohanlal as Advocate Vijayamohan, Sara's special prosecutor
- Priyamani as Advocate Poornima Rajasekharan, Rajasekharan's daughter
- Santhi Mayadevi as Adv. Ahaana John, Vijayamohan's assistant
- Siddique as Advocate Rajasekharan, Michael's defense lawyer and Poornima's father
- Jagadish as Mohammed, Sara's father
- Sreedhanya as Parveen Mohammed, Sara's mother
- Sankar Induchoodan as Michael Joseph
- K. B. Ganesh Kumar as Thumba Police Station CI Paul Varghese
- Abraham Jacob as Christopher Joseph, Michael's father
- Sabitta George as Ancy Joseph, Michael's mother
- Haritha G. Nair as Adv. Aswathy Nair, Vijayamohan's junior
- Mathew Varghese as Judge
- Prashant Nair as CI Martin Joseph
- Reshma Anil as Seema, Mohammed's housemaid
- Krishna Prabha as Dr. Beena Nair
- Kalesh Ramanand as Vinod, Michael's friend
- Nandhu as Public Prosecutor Adv. Sajan Varghese
- Dinesh Prabhakar as Robin, Michael's driver
- Arfaz Ayub as James, Michael's friend
- Harikrishnan as Jayachandran, Michael's friend
- Aditi Ravi as Nikhila, Jayachandran's wife
- Poojappura Radhakrishnan as Vijayamohan's clerk
- Rajesh Hebbar as Resort Manager
- Antony Perumbavoor as Mohammed's neighbour
- Suresh Pillai as Senior Advocate's clerk

== Production ==
=== Development ===
I asked Shanti to write down in order as to how the legal procedures would unfold for such a case. But once she wrote it, I realised that it would be ideal for a series but there are different sets of challenges when you package it for a film. Also, there is a risk of monotony that can creep into the narrative. So the challenge was to keep it engaging and play to the gallery a bit without taking away the authenticity.

— Jeethu Joseph about the challenges in writing.

On 13 July 2023, producer Antony Perumbavoor officially announced an untitled film directed by Jeethu Joseph starring Mohanlal. The project, under the working title Production No.33, signifies the 33rd production of Aashirvad Cinemas, with filming scheduled to commence in August that year. It was reported that Mohanlal would complete his work in a single short schedule before the commencement of the filming of Prithviraj Sukumaran's L2: Empuraan, which was postponed due to Prithviraj's leg injury, allowing Mohanlal to work in Neru.

The title was officially revealed on 12 August 2023 with a moster featuring the tagline "seeking justice," along with the title presented in Braille inscription. Neru marks the fifth collaboration between Mohanlal and Joseph. The screenplay was co-written by Santhi Mayadevi and Joseph, with the former having previously collaborated with the latter as an actress in Drishyam 2. Jeethu conceived the story several years ago. Santhi, a practicing lawyer, was initially hired by Jeethu to assist him in writing the court scenes in Drishyam 2. Impressed by her contributions, he invited her to co-write Neru. Jeethu shared the story with her on the sets of Drishyam 2. She characterized the genre of the film as a "courtroom drama". Santhi explained that they approached the courtroom scenes in a more realistic manner, deviating from the dramatic courtrooms typically portrayed in films. According to Jeethu, his intention was to make an authentic courtroom drama that incorporates all technical procedures while maintaining a balance between dramatic elements and procedural tone. He said he was careful not to "stretch" the film with excessive realism. His objective was to offer a real courtroom experience to the majority of the audience who may not have encountered such a setting in real life.

=== Casting ===
Mohanlal was cast as a lawyer. Priyamani was cast in an important role. She joined the sets in September 2023. Anaswara Rajan was cast as Sara, a blind sculptor, around whom the story unfolds. Santhi Mayadevi, who initially had no plans to act in her own screenplay, eventually took on a role in the film at the invitation of Jeethu. The cast also consists of Jagadish, K. B. Ganesh Kumar, Siddique, Aditi Ravi, Nandhu, Dinesh Prabhakar, Sankar Induchoodan, Mathew Varghese, Kalesh Ramanand, Ramadevi, Sreedhanya, Kalabhavan Jinto, Reshmi Anil, and Prashant Nair.

=== Filming ===
Principal photography commenced on 17 August 2023, coinciding with the commencement of the Malayalam month of Chingam, considered an auspicious day. It began with a customary pooja function held at the Freemasons Club in Vazhuthacaud, Kerala. Subsequent filming took place in and around Thiruvananthapuram. Mohanlal joined the sets in Chitranjali Studio in early September. Filming was wrapped on 4 October 2023. Satheesh Kurup handled the cinematography. The costumes were designed by Jeethu's wife Linta Jeethu.

== Music ==
The film's music was composed by Vishnu Shyam with lyrics written by Vinayak Sasikumar. A pre-release single, "Roohe", was released on 19 December 2023, sung by Karthik along with a chorus by Shyam and Cathy Jeethu. The Times of India called it an "evocative composition" that showcases the "emotional ambiance of the narrative" which "further cemented the film's genre as an emotional drama". The soundtrack was released, two days later, which includes themes from the film and the trailer.

All tracks are written by Vinayak Sasikumar.

Neru (Original Motion Picture Soundtrack)
No.	Title	Singer(s)	Length
1.	"Roohe"	Karthik	03:11
2.	"Neru Theme"		02:43
3.	"Neru Trailer Theme"		02:20
Total length:			08:00

== Release ==
=== Theatrical ===
Neru was released in theatres worldwide on 21 December 2023. According to the media, the slot, initially reserved for Mohanlal's directorial debut, Barroz, was reassigned to Neru due to delays in post-production. The film competed with other major Christmas releases, such as Aquaman and the Lost Kingdom, Dunki, and Salaar: Part 1 – Ceasefire.

=== Home media ===
The streaming rights of the film were acquired by Disney+ Hotstar. The film was premiered on Disney+ Hotstar from 23 January 2024.

== Reception ==
=== Critical response ===
Neru received positive reviews from critics.

Anna Mathews of The Times of India gave 4.5 out of 5 stars and wrote that Mohanlal's and Siddique's David-Goliath battle "keeps viewers on the edge of their seats and emotional for the full 152-minute duration of the film. You will barely take your eyes off the screen" and noted that the film merits from its realistic story, "nonetheless, it is no less massy, and will appeal to all audiences". She also praised the cast, particularly Mohanlal's "superb subdued performance". Sajin Shrijith of The New Indian Express rated 3.5 out of 5 stars, describing it a "sensitive, insightful legal drama with an unwavering focus", acknowledging the makers for ensuring "Mohanlal's presence doesn't take the limelight away from Anaswara and the issues addressed". He singled out the performances of Mohanlal, Anaswara and Siddique, and praised the makers for exploring "various intricacies of the legal system" and its call for increased sensitivity from the public.

Sowmya Rajendran of Moneycontrol stated that "the screenplay is so fast-paced and the performances so superlative that Neru is almost always riveting even when it takes cinematic liberties". K. Janani of India Today gave 3 out of 5 stars and wrote, "Neru is a riveting courtroom drama that holds your attention throughout. And to have Mohanlal belting out dialogues on consent, women's rights and victim-shaming makes this film a worthy addition to the long list of women empowerment films." S. R. Praveen of The Hindu said the film "almost delivers a cathartic high" and that "Mohanlal is back to form with an understated performance, while Jeethu Joseph has found his mojo in this mostly riveting legal drama".

Nirmal Narayanan of International Business Times India commented that "Neru is not a fully-fledged commercial entertainer. But it is an emotional courtroom drama which will make you thrill until the credit starts rolling". He particularly praised the acting of Mohanlal and Anaswara, and the background score. Pavithra A. of The Week called it an "engaging courtroom drama" and concluded that "Jeethu Joseph's touch is evident throughout the film, reminding me of Drishyam and its sequel". She praised Mohanlal, Anaswara, and Siddique and rated 3 out of 5 stars. Rating 3 out of 5 stars, Cris from The News Minute described it a "poignant court drama" and added that "despite its amateurish setting, Neru becomes an important film with a few careful arguments, strongly worded and delivered by its key actors, from Mohanlal to Anaswara Rajan".

Swathi P. Ajith of Onmanorama wrote, "Neru is undeniably a satisfying and enjoyable watch, marking a successful return for Mohanlal in more serious roles. Witnessing Mohanlal portraying a lawyer and participating in thrilling courtroom debates for the case is truly refreshing." Anandu Suresh of The Indian Express gave 2.5 out of 5 stars and wrote that Mohanlal's performance makes the "150-minute runtime feel less prolonged. By fully immersing himself in the narrative and the filmmaker’s vision, Mohanlal avoids letting his star persona become a burden to the story. He adeptly portrays the role of Vijayamohan with precision, balancing the character’s vulnerability and abilities without overshadowing Vijayamohan’s ordinary nature".

Netizens pointed out that the film has similarities with the plot and climax scenes of Sketch Artist II: Hands That See, and that this is an inspired remake of it.

=== Box office ===
Neru collected ₹30 crore worldwide in 5 days of its release. It reached the ₹50 crore mark within 8 days of its release. The film crossed ₹60 crore globally in 11 days. The film grossed ₹75.25 crore on its 15th day with an overseas collection of ₹29.50 crore and a domestic gross of ₹45.75 crore. The film reached the ₹80 crore mark in 18 days. The film has grossed ₹84.50 crore worldwide by collecting ₹51.50 crore from India and ₹33 crore from overseas. In its final theatrical run, Neru grossed ₹86 crore worldwide.

== Plagiarism allegations ==
The allegations arose when Deepu K Unni filed a case with the Kerala HC, alleging that Jeethu Joseph and Santhi Mayadevi had plagiarized the script that he had written. Deepu claimed that he had met Jeethu and Santhi and had narrated the story to him.

There were reports that Neru bears a resemblance to the film Sketch Artist II: Hands That See, directed by Jack Sholder, and that it draws inspiration from Believe Me: The Abduction of Lisa McVey, directed by Jim Donovan.

== Sequels and spin-offs ==
In a pre-release promotional discussion in December 2023, Mohanlal, Jeethu, Santhi, and Antony disclosed that potential sequels to Neru may occur if the first film proves successful at the box-office. These sequels would explore additional cases handled by Advocate Vijayamohan. Mohanlal also mentioned the possibility of spin-offs centered around other characters.

== Accolades ==
Award	Category	Recipient	Result	Ref.
69th Filmfare Awards South	Best Film	Neru	Nominated	
69th Filmfare Awards South	Best Director	Jeethu Joseph	Nominated	
69th Filmfare Awards South	Best Supporting Actress	Anaswara Rajan	Won	
12th South Indian International Movie Awards	Best Actress	Anaswara Rajan	Won	
12th South Indian International Movie Awards	Best Film	Neru	Nominated	
12th South Indian International Movie Awards	Best Director	Jeethu Joseph	Nominated	
12th South Indian International Movie Awards	Best Actor	Mohanlal	Nominated	
12th South Indian International Movie Awards	Best Actor in a Supporting Role	Siddique	Nominated	
12th South Indian International Movie Awards	Best Lyricist	Vinayak Sasikumar – "Roohe"	Nominated	
