= Kuthukalvalasai =

- Suburb of Tenkasi City
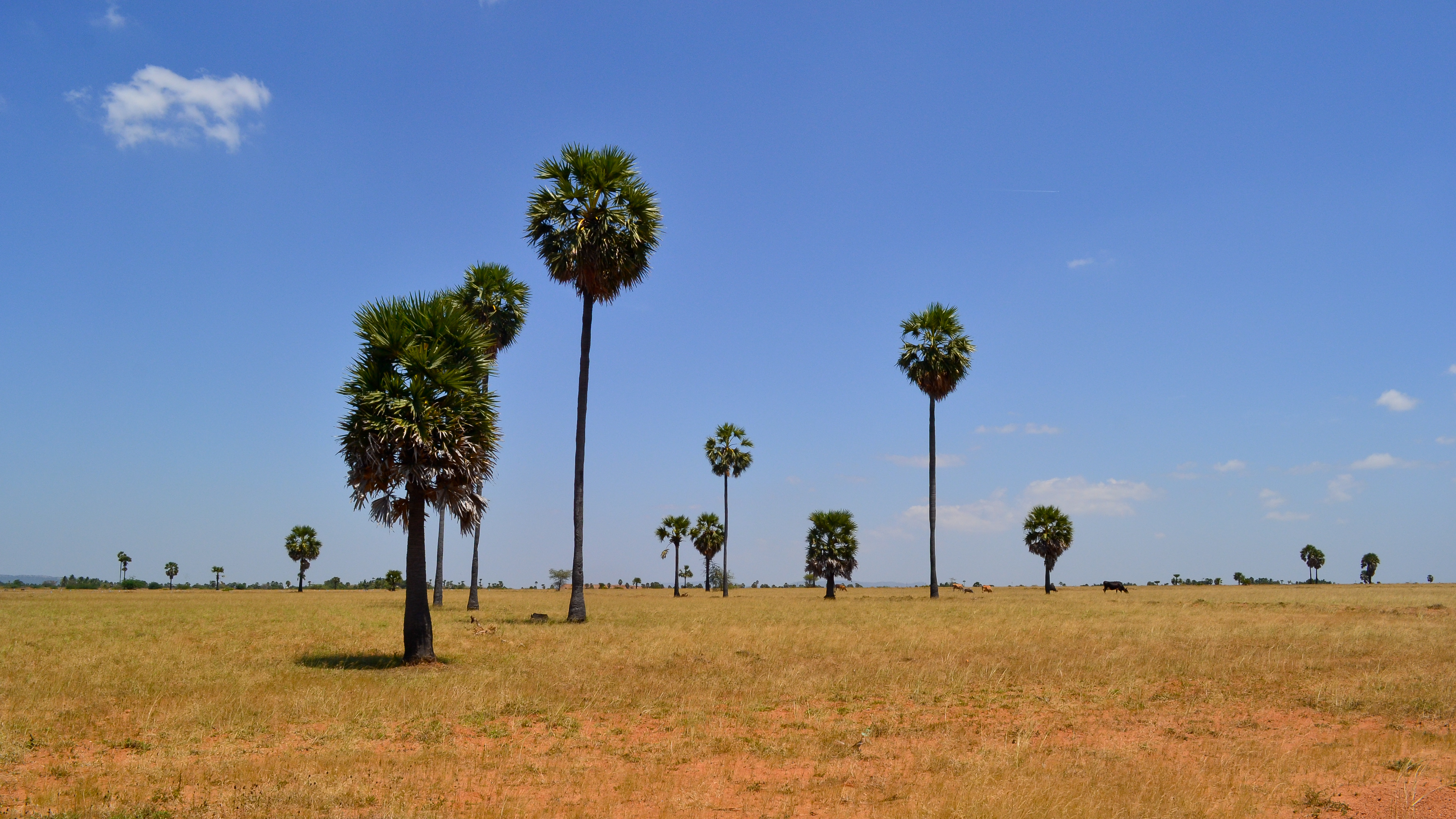

- Location in Tamil Nadu, India Kuthukalvalasai (India)
- Coordinates: 8.97°N 77.3°E
- Country: India
- State: Tamil Nadu
- District: Tenkasi

Languages
  - Official: Tamil
- Time zone: UTC+5:30 (IST)
- PIN: 627803
- Vehicle registration: TN-76
- 1 km northwest from Tenkasi new bus stand

Kuthukalvalasai is a neighborhood and suburb located in Tenkasi, Tamil Nadu, India, 1 km away from District headquarters Tenkasi. It is located at the foot of the Western Ghats and Courtallam hills.
