= Kusum Renu =

Sri Lankan actress (born 1961)

- කුසුම් රේණු
- Born: Dabare Kusum Renuka Liyanage; January 30, 1961 (age 65); Colombo
- Education: Anula Vidyalaya, Nugegoda
- Occupation: Actress
- Years active: 1979–present
- Spouse: Sriyantha Mendis (m. 1986)
- Children: Tharuki Amaya Mendis; Nipuni Preksha
- Relatives: Vidhushi Uththara (cousin daughter)

Dabare Kusum Renuka Liyanage (born January 30, 1961, as කුසුම් රේණු) [Sinhala]), popularly known as Kusum Renu, is an actress in Sri Lankan cinema theater and television. She is best known for the role Madhuri in television sitcom Nonavaruni Mahathvaruni and role Vishaka Samaranayake in the film Dharmayuddhaya.

== Personal life ==
Kusum Renu was born on 30 January 1961 in Colombo and completed her education from Anula Vidyalaya, Nugegoda. At the school times, she was a good sportswoman, a Girl Guide, a school prefect and a member of the school debating team. She also played Esraj for the Eastern Band.

Kusum Renu is married to Sriyantha Mendis, who is also a renowned actor and director. She met Sriyantha during the stage drama Pandukabhaya in 1984 and couple married on 25 October 1986 after the proposal in April 1985. The couple has two daughters. Elder daughter Nipuni Preksha is married to Shan Amanda Perera. Younger daughter Tharuki Amaya Mendis also acted in stage play Subha saha Yasa. Her cousin daughter Vidhushi Uththara is also a popular actress in television.

Elder daughter Nipuni specializes in fashion design, costume design, and stage costume design. Her husband Shan is a peon. Their daughter is Gabriela Kathleen. Second daughter Tharuki Amaya Mendis completed a NIBM course and studied Human Resources Degree.

== Acting career ==
Renu started acting since school times. Her uncle Senadheera Kuruppu was a popular actor at that time, where she made her public acting debut. Her first role came through T.B. Illangaratne's stage play Sailasanaya. Then she acted many television serials. In 1982 for Mandaram Wahi, Renu won four Certificates of Merit from National Youth Services Council. In the following year, she won a merit award for the role in Deiyange Punchi Akkaraya. In 1984, she won the Best actress award for the role in Hima Kunatuwa.

Renu got the opportunity to play the role of a maid and then the role of a prostitute in Prof. Ediriweera Sarachchandra's play Mahasara. She was given the role of Jane Oyster, the wife of a police officer Oyster Perera, in Sriyantha Mendis' play Sudu Saha Kalu. The uniqueness was that her verbal gesture was limited to three dialogues throughout the play. She also has had the opportunity to play many historical characters in various art forms in recent times: as the queen of King Gajaba in the play Shashree Gajaba created by Vijaya Nandasiri. She also played the role 'Puransina' in the play Rassa Saha Parassa directed by Sriyantha Mendis. Prior to that, Renu acted as 'Lenchina' in Prof. Ariyaratne Kaluarachchi's play Jasaya and Lenchina. She then starred in the later production of Bandula Vithanage's play Romaya Gini Gani.

After the marriage in 1986, she took a break for the acting. She marked the comeback by winning Best Actress award at the State Drama Festival for the role in Deweni Mahinda in 1998. In 2000, she played the role 'vasuki' in the play Paadada Asapuwa directed by Sriyanatha. The premiere was held here on her birthday, January 30, 2000.

=== Selected television serials ===
- Agni Piyapath
- Aluth Gedara
- Anne
- Bandhanaa (2022)
- Damini
- Damsaari (2012)
- Dangamalla (2006)
- Deiyange Punchi Akkaraya (1983)
- Deydunu Yanaya (2001)
- Doowaru (2012)
- Ethuma
- Gajaman Nona
- Himagira Naga
- Hima Kunatuwa (1984)
- Hiruta Pipena Sooriyakantha
- Iththo (2019)
- Itu Devi Vimana
- Mandaram Wahi (1982)
- Mathi Nethi Daa (2003)
- Mawa Mathakada
- Mini Muthu (2012)
- Nannaththara (2022)
- Neela Pabalu (2023)
- Nil Mal Viyana (2004)
- Nonavaruni Mahathvaruni as Madhuri (1997)
- Paradeesaya
- Package (2018)
- Pinkanda Simona
- Pipi Piyum (2007)
- Prarthana Mal (2010)
- Puja (2002)
- Raja Bhavana (2003)
- Rankira Soya (2004)
- Ran Miriwedi
- Ran Sevaneli (2009)
- Ruwan Maliga as Trilicia
- Sanda Numba Nam
- Satharadenek Senpathiyo
- Sathara Ima Gini
- Senehase Geethaya (2006)
- Sihina Genena Kumariye (2020)
- Sihina Kumari (2009)
- Sulang Kapolla
- Veeduru Thira
- Visirunu Renu (2008)
- Wassane Sihinaya (2009)
- Wes Muhunu
- Paba
- Mage Adara Awanaduwa

=== Selected stage dramas ===
- Danga Malla (2013)
- Mama Wenama Malak
- Suba Saha Yasa
- Mandaram Wehi (1982)
- Jasaya Saha Lenchina
- Deiyange Punchi Akkaraya (1983)
- Hima Kunatuwa (1984)
- Mahasara
- Raththaran
- Bheema Bhumi
- Ekata Mata Hinahina
- Magul Prastawa
- Ratnawalee
- Padada Asapuwa
- Wellawehum
- Deveni Mahinda (1998)
- Mama Wenama Malak (2011)
- Gebbara Minisa (2011)
- Raassa Paraassa
- Sudu Saha Alu
- Mamai Anduwa (2018)
- Hankithi Dahathuna
- Yathuru Hilen Balanna

== Filmography ==
Her maiden cinematic experience came through 1979 film Jeewana Kandulu, but was an uncredited role. In 1981, her major cinematic breakthrough was from Sathkulu Pawwa, which gained fame. Some of her popular films are Suhada Koka, Maharaja Gemunu and Dharmayuddhaya.

Key
†	Denotes films that have not yet been released

Year	Film	Role	Ref.
1979	Jeewana Kandulu		
1981	Eka Dawasak Ra		
1981	Sathkulu Pawwa		
1998	Julietge Bhumikawa	Patient	
2002	Punchi Suranganavi	Mrs. Pereira	
2003	Sonduru Dadabima	Madhumathi	
2006	Bherunda Pakshiya		
2011	Sinhawalokanaya	Dingiri Menike	
2012	Kusa Pabha	Queen Madhuraja	
2015	Suhada Koka	Malini	
2015	Sanjana		
2015	Maharaja Gemunu	Queen Viharamaha Devi	
2017	Dharmayuddhaya	Vishaka Samaranayake	
2018	Gharasarapa	Vidya's mother	
2018	Goal		
2019	Jaya Sri Amathithuma	Godamune madam	
2023	Kathuru Mithuru	cameo role	
2023	Midunu Vishwaya		
2025	Housefull		
2026	Dharmayuddhaya 2	Vishaka Samaranayake	
TBA	Surangana Lowin Awilla †	Jayashan's Mother	
TBA	Dharmayuddhaya 3 †	Vishaka Samaranayake	

== Awards ==
=== Hiru Golden Film Award ===
Year	Nominee / work	Award	Result
2016	Maharaja Gemunu	Best Supporting Actress	Won
2018	Dharmayuddhaya	Merit Award	Won
