= Dharmayuddhaya =

- Directed by: Cheyyar Ravi
- Story by: Jeethu Joseph
- Produced by: The Capital Maharaja Organisation Limited
- Starring: Jackson Anthony; Dilhani Ekanayake; Kusum Renu; Thisuri Yuwanika
- Cinematography: S. Saravanan
- Edited by: S. P. R. Raja Sethupathi
- Music by: Song: Sachith Peris; Score: Ghibran (reused from Papanasam)
- Production company: MTV Channel
- Distributed by: M Entertainments
- Release date: 14 July 2017
- Running time: 158 minutes
- Country: Sri Lanka
- Language: Sinhala
- Box office: 22.4 LKR Crores

Dharmayuddhaya (Sinhalese: ධර්මයුද්ධය; transl. War for Justice) is a 2017 Sri Lankan Sinhala-language crime drama film directed by Cheyyar Ravi and produced by MTV Channel and The Capital Maharaja Organization Limited, and distributed by M Entertainments. It is a shot-for-shot remake of the Indian Malayalam-language film Drishyam (2013) starring Mohanlal by Jeethu Joseph. The film stars Jackson Anthony and Dilhani Ekanayake in the lead roles and features Kusum Renu, Kumara Thirimadura, Thisuri Yuwanika and Roshan Pilapitiya in supporting roles. The song was composed by Sachith Peris.

It is the 1282nd Sri Lankan film in the Sinhala cinema. The premiere of the movie was held on 13 July 2017 at Regal Cinema. The director, Cheyyar Ravi, had died in March 2017 before the release. The film successfully passed a 100 days run in theatres.

== Plot ==
Harishchandra, an orphan, who had dropped out of school after 4th grade, now is a businessman running a real estate center in Manudampura. He is married to a woman named Rani and they have two daughters, Achini and Sachini. His only interest apart from his family is watching films and he spends most of his time in front of the TV in his small office.

During a nature camp, Achini gets recorded in the bathroom by a hidden cell phone which belongs to a young boy named Shane, the spoiled son of MP Vishaka Samaranayake. Shane blackmails Achini to open store room door while he come at late night, or else he would put the video on social media that would humiliate her. When Rani finds out about this and confronts Shane for it, Shane retaliates by demanding Rani sleep with him instead of Achini. Enraged by this, Achini hits on Shane's head with a pipe and broke the cell phone, killing him instantly. Horrified of what happened to Shane, Rani and Achini hide his body in a compost pit, which is witnessed by Sachini. Rani tells about the incident to Harishchandra, who devises a way to save his family from the law. He removes the broken cell phone and drives the Shane's car, which is seen by Harischandra's rival, Constable Vimal. Then, Harischandra drowns Shane's car into the river. This murder actually happened on August 2. To ensure things go smooth, Harischandra takes his family out on August 4,5 to a Meditation program which actually held on Matale August 2, watch a movie and eat at a restaurant. Upon seeing that Shane has gone missing, Vishaka starts an investigation.

After Vimal revealed that Shane's car which driven by Harishchandra, had found in a river, Vishaka calls Harishchandra and family for questioning. Predicting that this would happen, Harishchandra had already taught his family how to change their alibi at the time of murder. When questioned individually, they give the same replies, surprising Vishaka. Harishchandra also presents the bill of the restaurant, the movie tickets and the bus tickets as proof of their alibi. Vishaka questions the owners of the establishments they claim they have been to, and their statements prove Harishchandra's alibi. However, after contacting Thero who held meditation program on Matale, Vishaka learns that some DVDs had released about that program. Then, She realizes that, Harishchandra had faked the evidence and established his alibi on the owners by going on a trip with his family to the same establishments later; some time after the murder, Harishchandra had met the owners again, and during the meetings, he had cleverly plotted in their minds that they had visited Matale on August 2,3.

With that in mind, Vishaka arrests Harishchandra with his family, and Vimal uses brute force to beat the truth out of them. Eventually, Sachini gives in after being brutally beaten by Vimal and reveals the place where the body is buried. However, Vishaka and her husband soon learned from Shane's friend, Damith that Shane took pictures of Achini on his phone, realizing that they raised a perverted teenager who tried to rape a young girl. After digging the compost pit, they only find the carcass of a calf, as Harishchandra anticipated that they would find the location by moving Shane's body elsewhere. With no evidence to prove that Harishchandra and his family have murdered Shane, Harishchandra gets Sachini to publicly speak out against Vimal for beating her, resulting several citizens to chase and beat up Vimal, who then gets suspended for battery and assault. All charges against Harishchandra and his family are dropped, and Vishaka resigns from her post, presumably out of guilt over Shane's actions.

Later on, Vishaka and her husband apologize to Harishchandra and his family for their rude and violent behavior, holding themselves responsible for spoiling Shane in the first place and pleading to know what happened to him. A remorseful Harishchandra finally confesses that his family accidentally killed Shane because of what Shane tried to do to Achini. Harishchandra signs a register at the newly constructed local police station, where the new Inspector states that Harishchandra won't be fooling him and the police, to which Harishchandra replies that the police are only there to protect citizens like him, and that he has no intention of fooling them any further. As he leaves, a flashback shows him leaving the incomplete police station with a shovel in hand. The earlier dialogue and the flashback both subtly imply that he has hidden Shane's body in the foundations of the police station itself because no one would think to look there.

== Cast ==
- Jackson Anthony as Harischandra – A businessman who runs an estate center
- Dilhani Ekanayake as Rani Harischandra – Harischandra's wife
- Kusum Renu as PM Vishaka Samaranayake – Parliament member and lawyer, Shane's mother
- Roshan Pilapitiya as OIC Ravi – OIC of Manudampura Police
- Kumara Thirimadura as PC Vimal – Former inspector of Manudampura Police
- Thisuri Yuwanika as Achini Harischandra – Harischandra and Rani's elder daughter
- Vinumi Vansadhi as Sachini Harischandra – Harischandra and Rani's younger daughter
- Danuka Dilshan as Shane Samaranayake – Vishaka and Upali's son
- Rohan Jayakody as Restaurant Cashier
- Ananda Atukorala as Sargent Jinadasa – Sargent of Manudampura Police
- Douglas Ranasinghe as Upali Samaranayake – Vishaka's husband and Shane's father
- Awanthi Aponsu as Rani's mother
- Wasantha Kumarasiri as Rani's father
- Ariyasena Gamage as Mudalali – Owner of Tea shop
- Tharanga Bandara as Rani's brother
- Mahinda Jinasena as Nihal – Contractor of New Police building
- Samantha Kumara Gamage as Film projector operator
- Sarath Rupasinghe as Rest House manager
- Somasiri Colambage as Siripala
- Nirukshan Ekanayake as Palitha – Harischandra's secretary
- Suresh Chandra as CTB Bus Conductor
- Damith Rukshan as Gamini
- Sureni Senarath as Principal
- Manjula Dissanayake as Damith – Shane's friend
- Sisira Thadikara as OIC – OIC of New Police building
- Madhusanka Bandara as Saman Witharana – Sargent of New Police building

== Production ==
Dharmayuddhaya is a remake of Drishyam.

== Songs ==
No.	Title	Lyrics	Singer(s)	Length
1.	"Neela Akase"	Sunil Ariyaratne	Meena Prasadini, Rooney	3:36
Total length:				3:36

== Box office ==
The film earned 5.35 crore SL rupees ($167,205) from 31 days of screening. The CEL theatre corporation revealed that the film has been watched by more than 235,000 viewers, by the end of first month. The film earned 9.55 crore SL rupees ($298,469) from 45 days, a record box office in Sri Lankan cinema. After 65 days of screening, the film had been watched by over 700,000 viewers, according to CEL theatres. After 100 days of screening, the film earned 22.4 crore SL rupees ($700,076).

== Accolades ==
Award	Category	Recipient(s)	Result
34th Sarasaviya Awards	Blockbuster Movie of the Year 2017	Dharmayuddhaya	Won
34th Sarasaviya Awards	Best Actress 2017	Dilhani Ekanayake	Nominated
34th Sarasaviya Awards	Best Actor 2017	Jackson Anthony	Nominated
34th Sarasaviya Awards	Best Emerging Actress 2017	Thisuri Yuwanika	Won
SLIM-Nielsen Peoples Awards 2018	People's Choice Film Of The Year	Dharmayuddhaya	Won
Derana Film Awards 2018	Blockbuster Movie of the Year	Dharmayuddhaya	Won
Derana Film Awards 2018	Best Actor	Jackson Anthony	Won
Derana Film Awards 2018	Best Actress	Dilhani Ekanayake	Won
Derana Film Awards 2018	Best Actor In a Supporting Role	Kumara Thirimadura	Won
Hiru Golden Film Award 2018	Best Actor in a Supporting Role	Kumara Thirimadura	Won
Hiru Golden Film Award 2018	Most Popular Child Actor	Vinumi Wasandi	Won
Hiru Golden Film Award 2018	Special Recognition Certificate	Kusum Renu	Won
SIGNIS Awards (Sri Lanka) 2018	Best Actor	Jackson Anthony	Won
SIGNIS Awards (Sri Lanka) 2018	Best Actor In a Supporting Role	Kumara Thirimadura	Won
Presidential Film Awards 2019 for 2017	Special Jury Award	Vinumi Vansadi	Won
Presidential Film Awards 2019 for 2017	Film with Highest Patron Response	Dharmayuddhaya	Won
Presidential Film Awards 2019 for 2017	Best Actress in a Supporting Role	Thisuri Yuwanika	Nominated
Presidential Film Awards 2019 for 2017	Best Actress in a Supporting Role	Kusum Renu	Nominated
Presidential Film Awards 2019 for 2017	Best Actor in a Supporting Role	Kumara Thirimadura	Nominated
Presidential Film Awards 2019 for 2017	Best Actress in a Leading Role	Dilhani Ekanayake	Nominated
Presidential Film Awards 2019 for 2017	Best Actor in a Leading Role	Jackson Anthony	Nominated

== Sequel ==
Dharmayuddhaya 2 was officially announced by MTV Channel on 28 May 2025. It is directed by Aruna Jayawardene. Bimal Jayakodi will be seen playing the role of Harischandra and while Dilhani Ekanayake, Kumara Thirimadura, Kusum Renu, Thisuri Yuwanika, Douglas Ranasinghe reprise their roles. Ashan Dias, Dinakshie Priyasad, Nalin Lusena and Kalana Gunasekara played in other supportive roles.
