= Zor (film) =

- Directed by: Sangeeth Sivan
- Screenplay by: N. Maharajan
- Dialogues by: Sanjay Masoomm
- Story by: N. Maharajan
- Produced by: Vivek Kumar
- Starring: Sunny Deol; Sushmita Sen; Om Puri; Anupam Kher; Mohan Agashe; Milind Gunaji
- Cinematography: Jeeva
- Edited by: A. Sreekar Prasad
- Music by: Score: Vidyasagar; Songs: Agosh
- Production company: Vicky Films
- Distributed by: Eros Entertainment
- Release date: 13 February 1998 (India)
- Running time: 155 minutes
- Country: India
- Language: Hindi
- Budget: ₹10 crore
- Box office: ₹18.59 crore

Zor (transl. Strength) is a 1998 Indian Hindi-language action film produced by Vivek Kumar and directed by Sangeeth Sivan. It stars Sunny Deol, Sushmita Sen, Om Puri, Anupam Kher, Mohan Agashe and Milind Gunaji. In the film, a man tries to prove his father's innocence when the latter is labeled a traitor, and in the process discovers the involvement of his friend, a terrorist, in this fiasco. After directing Malayalam films, Sivan makes his directorial debut in Hindi cinema with this film.

The film was released theatrically on 13 February 1998. It grossed ₹18.59 crore worldwide against a budget of ₹10 crore.

== Plot ==
Arjun, a photojournalist, is the only son of Police Commissioner Uday Singh, living happily with his parents, younger sister and grandmother. He meets Aarti, a low profile reporter in a small daily who wants to be a famous journalist. They both fall in love and decide to get married, but there is a problem.

Arjun tells Aarti that they need to wait for the approval of his close friend Iqbal, who is a former Indian Army Captain before they can get married. Meanwhile, Arjun's father is blamed for letting off an unknown terrorist and declared a traitor. Iqbal is also present at Arjun's house during Arjun's sister's engagement, when the police arrest Commissioner Singh. Arjun believes it is a conspiracy against his father and sets off to find the fugitive terrorist and catch the people behind the conspiracy to restore his father's dignity. Meanwhile, Iqbal leaves Arjun's home without any clue.

This makes Arjun suspicious about Iqbal and he goes to Kashmir. He survives a terrorist attack there and finds that Iqbal is the leader of the group which attacked him. Iqbal tells Arjun why he became a terrorist from a patriotic army captain. Iqbal had a family and wife whom he loved more than anything, however he lost them in a communal riot in his village. A communal leader Shah Alam took him along hundreds of youths to prepare them to fight against the people who destroyed their village. Gradually, Iqbal is turned into an anti-national and eventually a leader of a terrorist group.

Upon hearing Iqbal's story, Arjun explains to him that it is all a conspiracy to make Iqbal a terrorist as he was an expert in explosives while serving in the Indian Army, thus utilizing his skills to produce explosives to destroy his own country and his own people. Iqbal finally understands Arjun's point and agrees to help him.

Upon hearing that Iqbal has left him, Shah Alam informs his crime partner Swamiji. Swamiji goes to Ajay's home and threatens to finish off his family if he does not keep quiet. Swami and Alam are also looking for Iqbal, to kill him, as he is going to be a witness against them.

Finally, when Arjun's father is about to be pronounced guilty, Arjun brings Iqbal to court after going through a lot of bloodshed. Arjun clarifies to the judge that it's people like Swamiji and Alam who are the real traitors, who create terrorists out of innocent people like Iqbal. Iqbal gives all evidence against Alam and Swamiji, thus the court declares Iqbal and Commissioner innocent and releases them. Alam is arrested, however, Swamiji refuses to give in, saying that his followers will create a ruckus if he is arrested, however, Arjun with help of his media friends have entire proceedings of the court live telecast on a national television channel, hence revealing Swamiji's real nature to his followers. Upon coming to know of this, Swamiji's own followers beat him to death. Arjun has accomplished his mission after restoring his father's dignity.

== Cast ==
- Sunny Deol as Arjun Singh
- Sushmita Sen as Aarti, Arjun's girlfriend.
- Om Puri as Shah Alam
- Anupam Kher as Police Commissioner Uday Singh, Arjun’s father.
- Mohan Agashe as Swami Satyanand
- Milind Gunaji as Iqbal Khan, Arjun's friend.
- Govind Namdeo as Central Minister
- Dina Pathak as Dadi, Arjun's grandmother.
- Laxmikant Berde as Pandu, Aarti’s colleague.
- Tiku Talsania as Newspaper Editor, Aarti's boss.
- Deepanjali as Sarita, Arjun's sister.
- Sucheta Khanna as Shabana Khan, Iqbal’s sister.
- Veeru Krishnan as Municipality worker

== Production ==
The song "Tere Pyaar Mein" was shot in Switzerland.

== Music and soundtrack ==
The music for the songs of the film was composed by Agosh and the lyrics were penned by Anand Bakshi. The background score of the film was done by Vidyasagar.

Zor

Soundtrack album by Agosh
- Released: November 1997
- Genre: Feature film soundtrack
- Language: Hindi
- Label: Plus Music

No.	Title	Artist(s)	Length
1.	"Tere Pyar Mein"	Shankar Mahadevan, Hema Sardesai	5:21
2.	"Mein Kudi Anjaani"	Hema Sardesai	6:00
3.	"Koi Dekh Raha"	Udit Narayan, Kavita Krishnamurthy	5:37
4.	"Pehli Pehli Baar"	Anuradha Sriram, Gopal Rao	6:43
5.	"Zor Dekho"	Gopal Rao	4:10
6.	"Gham Na Karo"	Sonu Nigam, Kavita Krishnamurthy	4:43
7.	"Kya Tum Ne Hai Kah Diya"	Kavita Krishnamurthy	4:40
8.	"Naina Bole Naina"	Asha Bhosle
9.	"Chup Tum Raho"	M. M. Keeravani, K.S. Chithra
