= Santhi Mayadevi =

Indian actress

- Born: Nedumangad, Kerala, India
- Education: Kerala Law Academy
- Occupations: Actress; television presenter; screenwriter
- Years active: 2019–present

Santhi Mayadevi, also known as Santhi Priya, is an Indian actress and lawyer who primarily works in Malayalam films.

Mayadevi debuted as an actress alongside Mammootty in Ganagandharvan (2019). She worked with director Jeethu Joseph for the films Drishyam 2 (2021) and Neru (2023), which she co-wrote. In 2023, she acted alongside Vijay in the film, Leo.

== Personal life ==
Santhi Mayadevi born to Velayudhan Pillai and Radha Velayudhan Pillai in Nedumangad, Trivandrum, Kerala, India. She holds a Bachelor of Laws from the Kerala Law Academy and is a practicing advocate.

== Filmography ==
Key
†	Denotes films that have not yet been released

Year	Title	Role(s)	Notes
2019	Ganagandharvan	Adv. Anamika	
2021	Drishyam 2	Adv. Renuka	
2022	Naalam Mura	SP Reema John IPS	
2023	Leo	Parthiban's/Leo's Advocate	Tamil film
2023	Neru	Ahaana	Also screenwriter
2026	Valathu Vashathe Kallan	Forensic Surgeon Seetha	
2026	Drishyam 3	Adv. Renuka	
2026	Untitled Fahadh Faasil Project †	–	Screenwriter
