= Papanasam (film) =

2015 film by Jeethu Joseph

- Theatrical release poster
- Directed by: Jeethu Joseph
- Written by: Jeethu Joseph
- Dialogues by: Jeyamohan
- Based on: Drishyam by Jeethu Joseph
- Produced by: Suresh Balaje; George Pius; Rajkumar Sethupathi; Sripriya
- Starring: Kamal Haasan; Gautami; Nivetha Thomas; Esther Anil; Asha Sarath
- Cinematography: Sujith Vaassudev
- Edited by: Ayoob Khan
- Music by: Ghibran
- Production companies: Wide Angle Creations; RajKumar Theatres Pvt. Ltd.
- Distributed by: Maxlab Entertainments
- Release date: 3 July 2015
- Running time: 175 minutes
- Country: India
- Language: Tamil
- Box office: est. ₹100 crore

Papanasam (transl. Destruction of Sins) (Note: Also a film's title reference to Tirunelveli district famous picnic spot town of the same name.) is a 2015 Indian Tamil-language crime thriller film directed by Jeethu Joseph. A remake of Jeethu's own 2013 Malayalam film Drishyam, it was jointly produced by Suresh Balaje and Rajkumar Sethupathi. The film stars Kamal Haasan, Gautami, Nivetha Thomas, Esther Anil, Asha Sharath, Roshan Basheer, and Kalabhavan Mani. Sharath, Anil, and Basheer reprise their roles from the original.

The film tells the story of Suyambulingam, a middle-class cable TV operator, and his family. They come under suspicion when Varun Prabhakar, the son of the Inspector General Geetha Prabhakar, goes missing soon after sexually harassing Suyambulingam's elder daughter. The rest of the film reveals how Varun disappeared, and what Suyambulingam does to escape from being suspected, what he did to Varun, and to keep his family from not going to prison.

The production work of Papanasam was undertaken by Suresh Balaje and George Pious. The film's music was composed by Ghibran, the cinematography was handled by Sujith Vaassudev, while the editing was done by Ayoob Khan. Principal photography commenced on 25 August 2014 and lasted for seven months, with shooting held at Tirunelveli, Nanguneri, Tenkasi, Kuthukalvalasai, and Thodupuzha. The film was released on 3 July 2015 and is estimated to have grossed over ₹100 crore (equivalent to ₹165 crore or US$17 million in 2026) worldwide.

== Plot ==
Suyambulingam is an orphan who dropped out of school after the 4th grade. He is now a businessman running a cable TV service in Papanasam, a small town in the Tirunelveli district of Tamil Nadu. He owns two buildings in the main part of the village, and a well-built house in a garden of 5 acres. Suyambulingam is married to Rani Suyambulingam, and they have two daughters, 16-year-old Selvi Suyambulingam and 10-year-old Pulli Meena Suyambulingam. His only interest apart from his family is watching movies, and he spends most of his evenings in front of the TV in his small office.

When Selvi goes on an overnight camp tour to Kodaikanal with her school, she's filmed in the shower by a hidden cellphone. The culprit, Varun Prabhakar, is the spoiled son of Inspector General, Geetha Prabhakar. Days later, Varun calls Selvi and blackmails her for sexual favours. He tells her to come to her house's garden shed at midnight. Selvi brings Rani along, and both beg Varun to leave them alone. Varun asks Rani to replace Selvi in the deal. Enraged, Selvi strikes Varun's head, killing him instantly. Terrified, Rani and Selvi bury Varun's body in a compost pit, which Meena witnesses. The next morning, Rani tells Suyambulingam about the incident and he devises a way to save his family from the law. He removes Varun's broken cell phone and places Varun's SIM card in another mobile phone which he throws onto a national permit truck, and disposes Varun's yellow Maruti Suzuki Zen car in a abandoned mineral mine pond, which is spotted by Constable Perumal, who has a grudge against Suyambulingam. Suyambulingam then takes his family out on a trip to Tenkasi to attend a temple prayer meeting, and they watch a movie in a theatre, stay in a hotel, and eat at a restaurant. Meanwhile, Inspector General Geetha Prabhakar starts an investigation into her missing son.

After a preliminary investigation, Geetha calls Suyambulingam and his family for questioning. Suyambulingam, who had predicted that this would happen, had already taught his, plan their alibis for the time of the murder. When questioned individually, and also pre-practiced them to give the same replies during investigation. Suyambulingam also presents the alibi bill from the restaurant, hotel, as well as the tickets from the bus and the movie, as proof of their alibi. Geetha questions the owners of the establishments they have been to and their statements prove Suyambulingam's alibi. However, Geetha subsequently realises later that Suyambulingam had established his alibi on the owners by going on a trip alone, on the days presented in the receipts, and then once again with his family to the same establishments a few days later. Meanwhile, Suyambulingam tells his brother-in-law, Thangaraj, that if they are ever taken away by the police, he must notify the media and report their unlawful arrests.

Geetha arrests Suyambulingam and his family, and Perumal brutally hits them, including Meena to make the truth come out. Geetha learns from Varun's friend Alex about Selvi's video created by Varun. Eventually, Meena gives in and reveals the place where Varun's body is buried. After digging the compost pit, they find the carcass of a cattle Calf, indicating that Suyambulingam had moved the body. Before Geetha and Perumal could react to it, Suyambulingam and Meena go to the media and complain that Perumal brutally tortured them for a crime they didn't commit. Enraged, Perumal tries to hit Suyambulingam but Thangaraj and the villagers save them and trash Perumal.

Perumal is suspended from the job, all officers in the Papanasam Police station are transferred out of the district and Geetha resigns from her post. The district court prohibits the police from investigating Suyambulingam's family without their permission, in any case. Suyambulingam and his family are proven innocent.

Later, Geetha and her husband Prabhakar meet Suyambulingam to ask forgiveness for their rude and violent behaviour. Prabhakar then explains that they both plan to relocate to the US. Before leaving, Prabhakar begs Suyambulingam to reveal what happened to Varun. Filled with guilt, Suyumbulingam cryptically explained that Varun was killed by accident and wishes them well. The scene moves back to the police station at the beginning. As Suyambulingam signs out, the station's new sub-inspector tells him that he will find Varun's body. As Suyambulingam leaves, a flashback is shown of him burying something in the station's construction, implying that he has hidden Varun's body underneath the newly opened police station building.

== Cast ==
- Kamal Haasan as Suyambulingam
- Gautami as Rani Suyambulingam
- Nivetha Thomas as Selvi Suyambulingam
- Esther Anil as Meena Suyambulingam
- Asha Sarath as IG Geetha Prabhakar IPS
- Anant Mahadevan as Prabhakar
- Roshan Basheer as Varun Prabhakar
- Kalabhavan Mani as Constable Perumal
- Aruldoss as Sub-Inspector R. Suresh Babu
- Ilavarasu as Head Constable C. Shanmugam
- Delhi Ganesh as Vijayakumar, Rani's father
- Shanthi Williams as Radhika, Rani's mother
- Charle as Kannan, Bus Conductor
- Vaiyapuri as Krishnaswamy, Hotel Owner
- M. S. Bhaskar as Sulaiman Bhai, Tea Shop Owner
- Sree Raam as Cheramadurai
- Abhishek Vinod as Thangaraj
- Cheran Raj as Sub-Inspector S. Boominathan
- Madhan Gopal as Karuppu
- Kavi Periya Thambi as Mariappan
- Jayamani as Bus Conductor
- Hello Kandasamy as Cinema Operator
- Nellai Siva as Suyambulingam's neighbour
- Arun Panackal as Alex, Varun's friend

== Production ==
=== Development ===
After the critical and commercial success of the 2013 Malayalam film Drishyam directed by Jeethu Joseph and starring Mohanlal, several regional producers approached the makers for remake rights. A Tamil version was planned to be jointly produced by Suresh Balaje, George Pius of Wide Angle Creations, Rajkumar Sethupathi and Sripriya Rajkumar of Raj Kumar Theatre. The team subsequently signed on Kamal Haasan in late January 2014, to enact the leading role after successful negotiations, with Jeethu choosing to direct the Tamil version himself.

Jeethu said that Rajinikanth was initially approached to do the lead role and although he was interested, he had doubts regarding a few scenes and how they would appeal to his fans. Jeethu and Haasan then chose to alter the storyline to make it familiar with Tamil audiences. Jeethu further said that the Tamil version had been made "more emotional" since Kamal Haasan felt that Tamil audiences like to be "emotionally piqued". In August 2014, the film was reported to be titled Papanasam. Pranav Mohanlal joined the team as an assistant director during the film's first schedule. B. Jeyamohan was selected to write the dialogues. He revealed that Suka, known for his Tirunelveli-based short story series "Moongil Moochu" that was published in Ananda Vikatan trained Hassan to speak in the Tirunelveli accent.

=== Casting ===
Haasan's partner Gautami was confirmed to play Meena's role from the original in June 2014, marking her comeback to acting after a sixteen-year sabbatical. Asha Sarath was chosen to reprise her role as a police officer from the original version. Niveda Thomas, who was supposed to act in Drishyam as the elder daughter of the lead pair but could not due to her examinations, was signed on to play the role in Papanasam, while child artiste Esther Anil was also added to the cast, reprising her role from the original. Roshan Basheer was also selected to reprise his role as Varun from the original. Sree Raam joined in the role of the protagonist's cable assistant after being recommended by one of the film's assistant directors.

=== Filming ===
Jeethu Joseph confirmed that principal photography would commence in the second half of 2014. It eventually commenced on 25 August 2014, with first schedule beginning in Tirunelveli where scenes featuring Haasan and Gautami were initially shot. Shooting took place in Nanguneri and Tenkasi, Kuthukalvalasai, Mekkarai, a town in the Tirunelveli district. Shooting also took place in Thodupuzha in the house originally used in the Malayalam version. The house underwent minor changes to look like a Tamil household. Principal photography was completed in October 2014.

== Plagiarism allegations ==
Sathish Paul, a Malayalam filmmaker, filed a petition with the Ernakulam District Court asking to stop the Tamil remake of Drishyam, alleging that the original film was a copy of his story published as a book in May 2013 called Oru Mazhakalathu. Benoy Kadavan, Sathish's advocate, informed that his client was told by Jeethu that Drishyam was going to be a family drama, and not a thriller. But when the film was released, he noted that it was an exact copy and that a notice was sent to Jeethu and both the Malayalam and the Tamil production houses asking for equal shares in the profits of the film. Jeethu clarified that his story might have had some similarities with the Japanese film, Suspect X (2008), but cited that it was not a copy of any other story and was willing to move to the High Court to prove it. In mid-March 2015, it was proved at the High Court that the allegation was false, with a verdict being passed confirming the film's originality.

== Soundtrack ==
The film's soundtrack is composed by Ghibran, continuing his association with Kamal Haasan after Uttama Villain (2015), with lyrics written by lyricist Na. Muthukumar. The official tracklist was released on 18 June 2015. The album was launched on 22 June 2015.

== Release ==
=== Theatrical ===
Papanasam was released theatrically on 3 July 2015.

== Reception ==
=== Critical response ===
On the review aggregator website Rotten Tomatoes, 100% of 9 critics' reviews are positive, with an average rating of 7.3/10.

Gautaman Bhaskaran of Hindustan Times gave the film 4 out of 5 and stated "A must watch for those fans of Kamal who have been waiting to see him as an actor -- not just a star driven to stunts". Deccan Chronicle gave 4 stars as well and wrote, "Riffing a sophisticated mix of the human condition and a simplistic storyline, Papanasam is a movie that engages your senses while managing to dispel any misgivings on a timely basis...director Jeethu Joseph has recreated the original magic of Drishyam but with a more localized flavor to boot".

Sify wrote "the Tamil version is even tighter [than Drishyam] and there is absolutely no room for error in the writing. Flawless is the word", going on to call the film "excellent". Writing for Rediff.com, Sukanya Verma, while calling the film a "worthy remake of Drishyam, stated, "I still like Drishyam better but Papanasam is a laudable runner up even if somewhat self-aware". Baradwaj Rangan wrote a positive review for The Hindu, praising the writing and Haasan's performance.

=== Box office ===
The film is estimated to grossed over ₹100 crore (equivalent to ₹165 crore or US$17 million in 2026) worldwide.
