= Cheyyar Ravi =

Indian film and TV director (1962–2017)

- Born: 14 February 1962; Thiruvannamalai dist, Cheyyar, Vadamanappakkam Village
- Died: 11 March 2017 (aged 54)
- Occupation: Film director
- Years active: 1998–2017

Cheyyar Ravi (c.14 February 1962 – 11 March 2017) was an Indian film and television director, who has directed Tamil and Sinhala films and serials.

== Career ==
Cheyyar Ravi directed two Tamil films in the 1990s, Dharma Seelan (1993) featuring Prabhu and Harichandra (1998) with Karthik. In 2009, he began pre-production on an untitled film starring Bharath and written by Crazy Mohan, but the film failed to materialise. It was reported in 2011 that Cheyyar Ravi would direct Nanbargal 40 Thirudargalum for Sivaji Productions featuring Kamal Haasan and Prabhu, but again, the film was never made.

He has since prioritised work as a director of television serials with most of the series produced by Sathya Jyothi films, making Gopuram in 2000, Panam in 2003, Anandham from 2003, Soruthihudu maneya maaligi in 2013 and Annakodiyum Aindhu Pengalum featuring Shruthi Raj in 2015. He also sits on the committee for the South Indian Small Screen Producers Council. He directed the Sinhalese remake of Malayalam film Drishyam titled Dharmayudhaya.

== Death ==
He died due to cardiac arrest on 11 March 2017, aged 54, while directing a TV series.

== Filmography ==
=== Films ===
Year	Film	Notes
1993	Dharma Seelan	
1998	Harichandra	
2017	Dharmayudhaya	Sinhalese film

=== Television ===
Year	Serial	Notes
2000-02	Gopuram	
2003	Varam	
2003	Panam	
2003-09	Anandam	
2015	Annakodiyum Aindhu Pengalum	
