= Anto Joseph =

Indian film producer

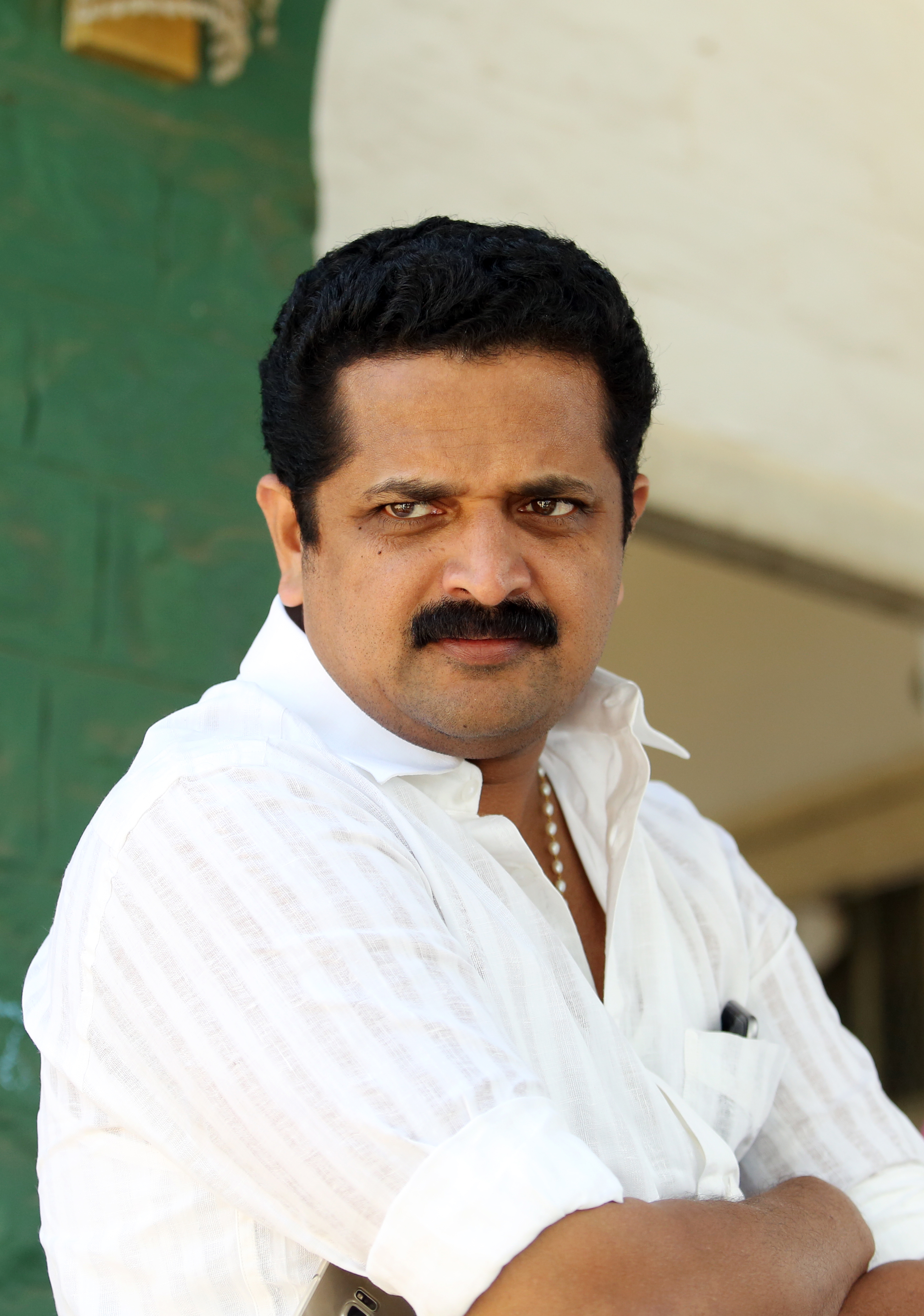
- Anto in 2021
- Born: 1 June 1972 (age 54); Kottayam, Kerala, India
- Occupations: Film producer; distributor
- Spouse: Neeta Pinto
- Children: 2

Anto Joseph (born 1 June 1972) is an Indian film producer, distributor and cinema exhibitor, who works predominantly in the Malayalam film industry. He began his career in Malayalam cinema in the early 1990s as a production associate.

In 2007, Joseph started his career as a film producer and served as the co-producer of Big B, starring Mammootty. Later, he launched his own film production company named Anto Joseph Film Company and produced films including Malik, Take Off, and The Priest. He currently serves as the general secretary of Kerala Film Producers Association and the president of KPCC Samskarika Sahithi.

Joseph's wife, Neeta Pinto, also started a company alongside Priya Venu in 2009, named Aan Mega Media. The company produces and distributes Malayalam films.

== Early life ==
Anto Joseph was born on 1972 June 1, as the son of P M Joseph and Molly Joseph. He hails from Kottayam, Kerala and studied in SH Mount High School. While studying in Government College, Kottayam he also served as the district secretary of Kerala Students Union.

== Career ==
Anto began his career as a production executive in the early 90s. His served as the production controller in many hit Malayalam movies like Black (2004 film), Thommanum Makkalum, Rajamanikyam and Mayavi etc. In 2007, he started as a film producer in association with other film production companies and made his debut as a producer with Mammootty-starrer crime thriller Big B (film), which despite having a lukewarm response in the theaters later went to be one of the biggest cult following movies in Malayalam Cinema. The movie also marked the debut of popular film director Amal Neerad. In 2009, Anto had his first major breakthrough as a producer with the film Annan Thambi. The movie was directed by Anwar Rasheed and had Mammooty on the double role. The movie turned out to be one of the highest grossers of that year. In 2014, he produced his first Tamil film starring named Bramman starring Sasikumar.
Later launched his own film production company named "Anto Joseph Film Company" and produced films like Malik, Take Off, The Priest etc. In 2020, he produced Kannum Kannum Kollaiyadithaal in association with Viacom18 Studios with Dulquer Salmaan on the lead. In 2017, he produced the film Take Off Starring Kunchacko Boban and Parvathy Thiruvothu which was one of the most critically acclaimed films of that year. The movie was well received in the box office and went to earn many prestigious film awards including two national awards and five Kerala state film awards.
He is the general secretary of Kerala Film Producers Association, vice president of Kerala Film Distributors Association and executive committee member of Kerala Film Chamber.

== Personal life ==
Anto Joseph is married to Neeta Pinto and they have two children named Andrea Neeta Anto and Avarachan Neeta Anto.

== Filmography ==
=== As producer ===
==== in association with other producers ====
Year	Film	Director	Lead	Other notes
2007	Big B	Amal Neerad	Mammooty, Manoj K. Jayan, Bala, Mamta Mohandas	Debut as producer
2008	Lollipop	Shafi	Prithviraj, Kunchako Boban, Jayasurya, Bhavana, Roma Asrani	
2008	Roudram	Renji Panicker	Mammooty, Sai Kumar, Rajan P.Dev, Lalu Alex, Abu Salim	
2008	Annan Thambi	Anwar Rasheed	Mammootty, Gopika, Lakshmi Rai, Siddique	
2009	Chattambinadu	Shafi	Mammootty, Raai Laxmi, Siddique, Manoj K.Jayan, Suraj Venjaramoodu, Salim Kumar, Vinu Mohan	
2014	Bramman	Socrates	Sasikumar, Lavanya Tripathi	First Tamil Film

==== via Anto Joseph Film Company ====
Year	Title	Director	Lead	Other notes
2012	The King & the Commissioner	Shaji Kailas	Mammootty, Suresh Gopi, Sai Kumar, Samvrutha Sunil	
2012	Cobra	Lal	Mammootty, Lal, Padmapriya, Kaniha	
2012	Da Thadiya	Aashiq Abu	Sekhar Menon, Sreenath Bhasi, Nivin Pauly, Ann Augustine	
2013	Proprietors: Kammath & Kammath	Thomson K. Thomson	Mammootty, Dileep, Rima Kallingal, Baburaj	
2013	Bharya Athra Pora	Akku Akbar	Jayaram, Gopika	
2013	Vishudhan	Vysakh	Kunchako Boban, Mia George, Hareesh Peradi	
2014	Salala Mobiles	Sharath Haridassan	Dulquer Salmaan, Nazriya	
2014	God's own Country	Vasudev Sanal	Fahadh Faasil, Mythili, Sreenivasan, Lal	
2014	Mathai Kuzhappakkaranalla	Akku Akbar	Jayasurya, Bhama, Mukesh, Lakshmi Gopalaswamy	
2015	Ivan Maryadaraman	Suresh Divakar	Dileep, Nikki Galrani, Sudheer Sukumaran,Kailash	Remake of Maryada Ramanna
2015	Bhaskar The Rascal	Siddiqque	Mammootty, Nayanthara, J D Chakravarthi,Kalabhavan Shajohn	
2015	Thinkal Muthal Velli Vare	Kannan Thamarakulam	Jayaram, Anoop Menon	
2017	Take Off	Mahesh Narayan	Kunchacko Boban, Parvathy Thiruvothu, Fahadh Faasil, Asif Ali	Winner of Two National Awards and Five Kerala State Film Awards
2018	Ente Ummante Peru	Jose Sebastian	Tovino Thomas, Urvashi	
2019	Oru Yamandan Premakadha	B.C. Noufal	Dulquer Salmaan, Nikhila Vimal, Vishnu Unnikrishnan	
2019	Ganagandharvan	Ramesh Pisharody	Mammootty, Manoj K.Jayan, Suresh Krishna, Johny Antony	
2019	Stand Up	Vidhu Vincent	Nimisha Sajayan, Rajisha Vijayan	
2020	Kannum Kannum Kollaiyadithaal	Desingh Periyasamy	Dulquer Salmaan, Ritu Varma	In association with Viacom18 Studios
2020	Kilometers and Kilometers	Jeo Baby	Tovino Thomas, India Jarvis	Released on Asianet
2021	The Priest	Joffin T. Chacko	Mammooty, Manju Warrier, Nikhila Vimal	
2021	Irul	Naseef Yusuf Izuddin	Fahadh Faasil, Soubin Shahir, Darshana Rajendran	Released on Netflix
2021	Nizhal	Appu N. Bhattathiri	Kunchako Boban, Nayanthara	
2021	Cold Case	Tanu Balak	Prithviraj, Aditi Balan	Released on Amazon Prime Video
2021	Malik	Mahesh Narayan	Fahadh Faasil, Nimisha Sajayan, Dileesh Pothan, Vinay Forrt	Released on Amazon Prime Video
2022	19(1)(a)	Indu VS	Vijay Sethupathi, Nithya Menen, Indrajith Sukumaran, Indrans	Released on Disney+ Hotstar; In association with Ann Mega Media
2026	Patriot	Mahesh Narayanan	Mammootty, Mohanlal, Fahadh Faasil, Kunchacko Boban	

==== via Aan Mega Media ====
Year	Films	Director	Lead Actors	Other notes
2009	Kana Kanmani	Akku Akbar	Jayaram, Padmapriya, Biju Menon	Remake of Gauri: The Unborn
2010	Kaaryasthan	Thomson K. Thomas	Dileep, Akhila, Siddique, Madhu	
2012	Mallu Singh	Vysakh	Kunchacko Boban, Unni Mukundan, Samvrutha Sunil, Biju Menon, Manoj K.Jayan	
2012	Puthiya Theerangal	Sathyan Anthikad	Nivin Pauly, Namitha Pramod, Nedumudi Venu, Innocent	
2022	Night Drive	Vysakh	Indrajith Sukumaran, Anna Ben, Roshan Mathew, Siddique	
2022	Malikappuram	Vishnu Sasi Sankar	Unni Mukundan, Saiju Kurup, Ramesh Pisharody, Manoj K. Jayan	In association with Kavya Film Company
