= Aakashamittayee =

Akashamittayee
- Theatrical release poster
- Directed by: Samuthirakani; M. Padmakumar
- Written by: K. Gireesh Kumar
- Screenplay by: Samuthirakani
- Based on: Appa (Tamil)
- Produced by: Maha Subair
- Starring: Jayaram; Kalabhavan Shajohn; Iniya; Sarayu
- Narrated by: Mohanlal
- Cinematography: Alagappan N.
- Edited by: Ranjan Abraham
- Music by: Mansoor Ahamed
- Production company: Varnachitra Big Screen Studios India
- Distributed by: Maha Subair Movies
- Release date: 19 October 2017 (Kerala)
- Running time: 138 minutes
- Country: India
- Language: Malayalam

Akashamittayee is a 2017 Indian Malayalam-language family drama film co-directed by Samuthirakani and M. Padmakumar. Written by K. Gireesh Kumar. Scripted by Samuthirakani, it is a remake of his 2016 Tamil film Appa directed by Samuthirakani with Yuvasri Lakshmi and Nasath reprising their roles. The film stars Jayaram, Kalabhavan Shajohn, Iniya, and Sarayu in the lead roles. It was released in Kerala on 19 October 2017 coinciding with Deepavali. The movie captures the area around Hindustan Newsprint Limited (HNL), located at Velloor in Kottayam District in Kerala.

== Plot ==
The story is about two different fathers, and how they raise their kids.

== Cast ==
- Jayaram as Jayasankar
- Kalabhavan Shajohn as Peethambaran
- Iniya as Radhika
- Sarayu as Rekha
- Yuva Lakshmi as Aparna
- Nandhana Varma as Saira Bhanu
- Dev Prayag Hari as young Aakash
- Anil Murali as Pazhani
- Usha as Pazhani's wife
- Seema G. Nair as Aparna's mother
- Anthony Kochi as Radhika's father
- Suresh Krishna as Dr. Mohan
- Majeed as School staff
- Irshad as Joseph
- Balachandran Chullikkad as himself

== Soundtrack ==
Aakashamittayi

Soundtrack album by Manzoor Ahamed
- Released: 21 October 2017
- Recorded: 2017
- Genre: Feature film soundtrack
- Label: Satyam Audios
- Producer: Manzoor Ahamed

The songs were composed by Manzoor Ahamed. The soundtrack album, which was released on 2017, features songs with lyrics penned by Rafeeq Ahmed.

Track	Song	Artist(s)
1	"Aakaasha Palakombathu"	Abhijith Vijayan
2	"Aakaasha Palakombathu"	Manzoor Ahmed
3	"Kiya Kiya Kokkku"	Rimi Tomy, Anusha
4	"Pularikal Pookkalil"	Gopu Krishna
5	"Uyaramillaymayanente"	Viswajith, Sudheep

== Reception ==
Padmakumar K of Onmanorama rated the film two-and-a-half out of five stars and wrote that "Though average in terms of artistic scale, the movie gives some worthwhile insights into the present scenario of education system. It's preachy yet watchable."
