= Gopika =

Indian actress (born 1984)

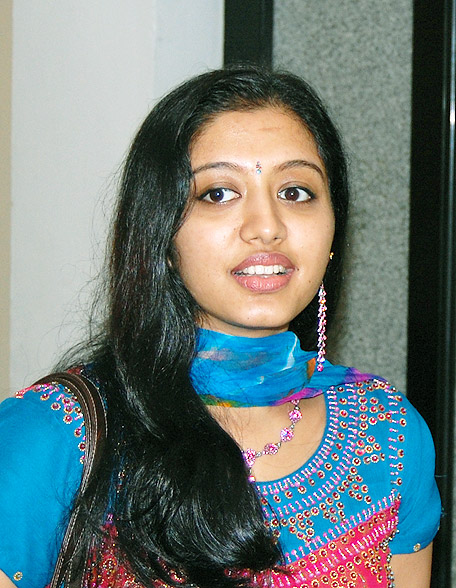
- Born: Girly Anto; 1 February 1984 (age 42); Ollur, Thrissur, Kerala
- Occupations: Actress; model
- Years active: 2002–2009,2013
- Spouse: Ajilesh Chacko (m. 2008)
- Children: 2

Girly Anto, credited by her stage name Gopika (born 1 February 1984), is an Indian former actress, who has starred in Malayalam films. Starting her career as a model, she ventured into acting with the Malayalam film, Pranayamanithooval (2002), directed by Thulasidas, opposite Vineeth Kumar. She acted in the Tamil, Telugu and Kannada film industries as well.

== Early life ==
Gopika was born on 1 February 1984, as Girly Anto at Ollur in the Thrissur district of Kerala to Anto Francis and Tessy. She has a younger sister, Glini. She studied at St. Raphael's Convent Girls High School, Ollur, and then pursued a degree in Sociology from Calicut University.

Gopika learned classical dance from an acclaimed teacher, Kamalher, and she was crowned 'Miss College' during her farewell ceremony at the college. The beauty contest 'Miss Thrissur' was a turning point in her life. Though she did not win the title, she stood as the runner-up in the contest, which gained her a few modeling assignments. She claims that she never wanted to be an actress, and her ambition was to be an air hostess.

== Career ==
Her first film was Pranayamanithooval, in which she starred with Jayasurya and Vineeth under the direction of Thulasi Das, did not do well, but it got her recognition in the industry. Her second film, 4 the People, was a blockbuster and was dubbed in many Indian languages. It was directed by Jayaraj, and she acted opposite Tamil actor Bharath. The song "Lejjavathiye Ninde Kalla Kadaikkannil" from the film was a big hit in Kerala. Renowned Tamil movie director Cheran signed her up for his film Autograph, which was another big hit in 2004. She also acted in Kana Kandaen (2005).

Among her other work, she has acted in the Kannada film Kanasina Loka, her Kannada debut, which was a remake of the 1998 Malayalam film Meenathil Thalikettu which is also her one and only Kannada film till date and the Telugu remake of Azhagi, Leta Manasulu, both, crashed at the box office. She starred in the Malayalam movie Keerthi Chakra opposite Jiiva. Directed by Major Ravi, the movie tells the story of a soldier against the backdrop of the Kargil war. Apart from Keerthi Chakra, she did another movie with Dileep: Pachakuthira. Her previous film with Dileep, Chanthupottu, was a big hit. Veruthe Oru Bharya was a phenomenal hit, and it gained her the Asianet Best Actress award of 2008. Sreeja has been providing her voice since the first movie. Devi has voiced in the last three films and Vimmy Mariam George in Smart City.

== Personal life ==
On 17 July 2008, Gopika married Ajilesh Chacko, a doctor working in Northern Ireland. They have a daughter and a son. The family then moved to Brisbane, Australia, and has settled there.

== Filmography ==
Year	Title	Role	Language	Notes
2002	Pranayamanithooval	Meera Manjari	Malayalam	Debut film
2003	Aaradyam Parayum	Priya	Malayalam	Unreleased
2004	4 the People	Divya Anand	Malayalam	Partially reshot in Tamil as 4 Students
2004	Autograph	Lathika	Tamil	Tamil debut
2004	Kanasina Loka	Amulya	Kannada	Kannada debut
2004	Naa Autograph	Latika	Telugu	Telugu debut Remake of Autograph
2004	Letha Manasulu	Bhanu	Telugu	
2004	Yuvasena	Sarika	Telugu	
2004	Vesham	Revathi	Malayalam	Won - Asianet Best Supporting Actress Award
2005	Finger Print	Preethi Varma	Malayalam	
2005	Chanthupottu	Malathi	Malayalam	
2005	Nerariyan CBI	Anitha	Malayalam	
2005	The Tiger	Suhara Ahammed	Malayalam	
2005	Kana Kandaen	Archana	Tamil	
2005	Ponniyin Selvan	Kani	Tamil	Partially reshot in Telugu as Muddula Koduku
2005	Thotti Jaya	Brindha	Tamil	
2006	Pachakuthira	Nimmi	Malayalam	
2006	The Don	Zaheeda	Malayalam	
2006	Keerthi Chakra	Sandhya	Malayalam	Won - Asianet Best Star Pair Award (shared with Jeeva); Partially reshot in Tamil as Aran
2006	Pothan Vava	Gladis	Malayalam	
2006	Emtan Magan	Janani	Tamil	
2006	Veedhi	Seetha Mahalakshmi	Telugu	
2007	Mayavi	Indu	Malayalam	
2007	Smart City	Devi	Malayalam	
2007	Ali Bhai	Ganga	Malayalam	
2007	Nagaram	Radhika	Malayalam	
2007	Veerappu	Bharathi	Tamil	
2008	Malabar Wedding	Smitha	Malayalam	
2008	Janmam	Anthony's wife	Malayalam	
2008	Annan Thambi	Lakshmi	Malayalam	
2008	Twenty:20	Devi	Malayalam	
2008	Velli Thirai	Mythili	Tamil	
2008	Veruthe Oru Bharya	Bindu Sugunan	Malayalam	Won - Asianet Best Actress Award
2008	Veedu Mamoolodu Kadu	Swathi	Telugu	
2009	Swantham Lekhakan	Vimala	Malayalam	
2013	Bharya Athra Pora	Priya Sathyanathan	Malayalam	Final film
