= Geetha Salam =

Indian actor

- Geetha Salam
- Born: Abdul Salam; 9 October 1946; Oachira, Travancore, British Raj
- Died: 19 December 2018 (aged 72)
- Other name: Salam
- Occupations: Actor; Dramatist
- Years active: 1979 – 2018
- Spouse: Rahmath
- Children: 2

Abdul Salam (9 October 1946 – 19 December 2018) was an Indian actor in Malayalam cinema known by his stage name Geetha Salam, known for Malabar Wedding, Jalolsavam (2004) and Mylanchi Monchulla Veedu (2014). He lived in Krishnapuram, Alappuzha, Kerala. He performed in about 82 Films and some TV series.

== Personal life ==
He was married to Rahmath, and was survived by two sons, Shan and Shafeer.

== Career ==
He started his career as a Dramatist artist with the drama group Geetha. He started his film career in the Malayalam film Mani Koya Kurup (1979), directed by S. S. Devadas and produced by P. P. Jose. His second movie was Megasandesam (Horror movie), directed by Rajasenan and produced by K. Radhakrishnan. He performed in about 82 films and some TV series. He received the Kerala Sangeetha Nataka Akademi Award in 2010.

== Filmography ==
Year	Film	Role	Director
2015	Thinkal Muthal Velli Vare	Pushpavalli's Uncle	Kannan Thamarakkulam
2014	Mathai Kuzhappakkaranalla	Teastall owner	Akku Akbar
2014	John Paul Vaathil Thurakkunnu	Paniker	Chandrahasan
2014	Vellimoonga	Politician	Jibu Jacob
2014	Romans	Oracle	Boban Samuel
2014	Sringaravelan	Astrologer	Jose Thomas
2008	Thirunakkara Perumal		Prasad Valacherry
2008	Malabar Wedding		Rajesh Faisal
2008	Kanal Kannaadi		AK Jayan Poduval
	Crazy Gopalan	school principal	Deepu Karunakaran
2007	Veeralipattu	Mammadikka	Kukku Surendran
2006	Kanaka Simhasanam	Kanakambaran's father	Rajasenan
2006	Kisan	Ayyappan	Sibi Malayil
2005	Kochi Rajavu	Auto Driver	Johny Antony
2005	Maanikyan		K. K. Haridas
2005	Pandippada	Broker	Rafi Mecartin
2005	Dead Line		Krishnajith S Vijayan
2005	December		Ashok R. Nath
2004	Jalolsavam	Kunjunju	Sibi Malayil
2004	Mampazhakkalam	Ashraf	Joshiy
2004	Kerala House Udan Vilpanakku	Ammavan	Thaha
2004	Udayam	Astrologer	Vinu Joemon
2004	Aan Piranna Veedu		K. P. Sunil
2003	Gramophone	Saigal Yousuf	Kamal
2003	Ente Veedu Appuvinteyum	Bhaskaran	Sibi Malayil
2003	Sadanandante Samayam	Saithali	Akku Akbar - Jose
2003	Meerayude Dukhavum Muthuvinte Swapnavum		Vinayan
2002	Kuberan		Sundar Das
2002	Savithriyude Aranjanam		Mohan Kupleri
2001	Ee Parakkum Thalika	Father of the groom	Thaha
2001	Megasandesam	Grandfather of Rosy	Rajasenan
1979	Mani Koya Kurup		SS Devadas

- Vasanthathinte Kanal Vazhikal
- To Let Ambadi Talkies
- David and Goliath
- Outsider
- Ee Thirakkinidayil
- Vellaripravinte Changathi
- Roudram

== Television series ==
- Grand Kerala Circus (Media One TV) 2014
- Akkamma Stalinum Pathrose Gandhiyum (Asianet) 2015
- Eeran Nilav (DD Malayalam) 2014
- Amala (Mazhavil Manorama) 2013
- Ammakilli (Asianet) 2011
- Kuttichatan (Surya TV) 2008
- Ellam Mayajalam (Asianet) 2005
- Aa Amma (Kairali TV) 2007-2008
- Kadamattathu Kathanar (TV series) (Asianet) 2004
