= CID Ramachandran Retd. SI =

- Official poster
- Directed by: Sanoop Sathyan
- Written by: Sanoop Sathyan; Aneesh V Sivadas
- Produced by: Shiju Mispa; Sanoop Sathyan
- Starring: Kalabhavan Shajohn; Baiju Santhosh; Sudheer Karamana
- Cinematography: Joe Christo Xavier
- Edited by: Lijo Paul
- Music by: Anu B Ivar
- Production company: AD 1877 Pictures
- Release date: 17 May 2024
- Country: India
- Language: Malayalam

CID Ramachandran Retd. SI is a 2024 Indian Malayalam language crime thriller film written and directed by Sanoop Sathyan. He has also co-written the script with Aneesh V Sivadas. The film stars Kalabhavan Shajohn, Baiju Santhosh and Sudheer Karamana. Film produced by Shiju Mispa and Sanoop Sathyan.

== Plot ==
After stepping down from his long-standing career, Ramachandran moves from Thiruvananthapuram back to his rural hometown in Punalur. Deeply passionate about his profession, he heavily struggles to adapt to civilian life and faces a severe sense of purposelessness. Seeing his restlessness, his lawyer friend Adv. Lalji suggests that he start a private crime investigation bureau to keep his passion alive.

Ramachandran takes the advice and sets up the detective agency. His first official case involves the mysterious murder of Urmila Devi, a local money lender and single mother who lived a complicated life after leaving her abusive, alcoholic husband.

The local police department severely mismanages the initial investigation. Under pressure to close the case, they wrongfully accuse and frame a local man named Jayarajan. Desperate to clear his name, Jayarajan approaches Ramachandran's new private bureau and pleads his innocence.

Driven by a desire for genuine justice, Ramachandran dives headfirst into the independent investigation.

He ultimately deduces that Urmila was involved in a secret extramarital affair. The murder was committed by her secret lover to steal money for his business.

== Cast ==
- Kalabhavan Shajohn as Rtd S.I Ramachandran
- Anumol as Urmila
- Baiju Santhosh as Advocate Lalji
- Sudheer Karamana as Jayarajan
- Shanker Ramakrishnan as DYSP Shahjahan
- Prem Kumar as Vasundaran
- Srikant Murali as Omanakuttan
- Anand Manmadhan as Raghu
- Azees Nedumangad as Saji
- Thulasidas as Balan Maash
- Deepu Navayikkulam as Rajan
- Pauly Valsan as Madhavi
- Balaji Sarma as ASI Sahadevan
- Geethi Sangeetha as Bindu
- Thushara Pillai as Vasantha
- Arun Punaloor as Conductor Suni
- Viyaan Mangalassery as Inspector Arun
- Nikhil as Manu
- Lakshmi Devan as Lathika
- Varsha as Arya
- Nandhana as Raji
- Selvaraj as Akri Ramesh
- Unni Raj as Purushan
- Shiju Mispa as Inspector

== Production ==
Principal photography began on 27 February 2023 with a customary pooja function held at Thiruvananthapuram.

== Music ==
The film's music was composed by Anu B Ivar and the background score was composed by Anto Francis. The song "Aarum Kaana" was released on 16 May 2024.

== Release ==
The film was released in theatres on 17 May 2024.

== Reception ==
CID Ramachandran Retd. SI received generally positive to mixed reviews. Gopika of The Times of India also gave a positive review rating the movie 2.5/5.
