= Achayans =

2017 film by Kannan Thanarakkulam

Achayans Movie
- Theatrical release poster
- Directed by: Kannan Thamarakkulam
- Written by: Sethu
- Produced by: C. K. Padma Kumar
- Starring: Jayaram; Unni Mukundan; Prakash Raj; Amala Paul; Anu Sithara; Sshivada; Adil Ibrahim; Sanju Sivram
- Cinematography: Pradeep Nair
- Edited by: Rejith K. R.
- Music by: Ratheesh Vega; Gopi Sundar (Background Score)
- Production company: DNVP Creations
- Distributed by: Rejaputhra Release
- Release date: 19 May 2017 (India)
- Running time: 140 minutes
- Country: India
- Language: Malayalam

Achayans is a 2017 Indian Malayalam-language comedy crime thriller film directed by Kannan Thamarakkulam and written by Sethu. It stars Jayaram, Unni Mukundan, Prakash Raj and Amala Paul in lead role as well as Sshivada, Anu Sithara, Sanju Sivram and Adil Ibrahim. Principal photography began in November 2016, with shooting locations being Edakochi and Vagamon. The film was released in India in May 2017 with mixed-to-negative reviews, Despite that, it was a Hit at box office. The film was later dubbed into Telugu as Marana Mrudangam.

== Synopsis ==
Four friends - Roy, Tony, Rafi, and Aby - get drunk on the night before Tony's wedding. Their family members send them to a Christian de-addiction centre, but they are kicked out. When they decide to start a road trip, they are accompanied by two women, Reetha and Prayaga, who have escaped from a critical situation. When they reach a hotel on New Year's Eve 2017, they sleep late after the celebration. The next day Reetha is found dead. Finding the culprit and the reason behind her death is the main plot of the film.

== Cast ==
- Jayaram as Roy Thottathil
- Unni Mukundan as Tony Vavachan
- Prakash Raj as Commissioner Karthik Viswanathan IPS
- Amala Paul as Reetha Fernandez
  - Baby Parthavi as Young Reetha
- Shivada as Jessica
- Anu Sithara as Prayaga
  - Akshara Kishor as Young Prayaga
- Sanju Sivram as rafi
- Adil Ibrahim as Aby
- Kaviyoor Ponnamma as Roy's mother
- Janardhanan as Varkey Vavachan, Tony's father
- Ponnamma Babu as Aleyamma Vavachan, Tony's mother
- Jayan Cherthala as George, Jessica's father
- Usha as Jessica's mother
- Siddique as Fernandez, Reetha's father
- Anju Aravind as Aleena, Reetha's mother
- Kumarakam Raghunath as Aravindan, Prayaga's father
- Nitha Promy as Prayaga's mother
- Maniyanpilla Raju as DSP Satheeshan Pothuvaal
- Suja Varunee as SI Panchami
- Shanu Suresh
- Idavela Babu as Sugathan
- Dharmajan Bolgatty as Sudharman
- Ramesh Pisharody as Father Jose Keerikkadan
- Kalabhavan Navas as Jose Keerikkadan's assistant
- Saju Navodaya as SI Nalinikanth
- Jayakrishnan as Police Officer
- Sohan Seenulal as Lakshmana
- Thesni Khan as Valsa
- Krishna as Craig
- Rajavarman Ramakrishnan as Tony's driver
- Sajan Palluruthy as Alcohol addict
- Jaise Jose as Goon
- Sruthi Ramakrishnan as Geetha
- Maya Viswanath
- P. C. George as himself (cameo appearance)

== Production ==
The venture began production in November 2016. Achayans marked third collaboration for the duo after Aadupuliyattam.

== Release ==
=== Theatrical ===
Achayans was opened in over 1000 screens in India, released alongside Godha and Adventures of Omanakuttan on 19 May 2017.

== Reception ==
=== Critical response ===
Indiaglitz rated 3/5 and said that "Achayans needs to have been reworked in a different way. A more sharper script would have made it more entertaining". Deccan Chronicle stated that the movie is a one time watch and rated 3.5/5. The Times of India rated the movie 3.5/5 and said that "Overall, Achayans is a film that requires some patience to watch and doesn't quite qualify as an entertainer".

=== Box office ===
Though the critic reviews were unfavourable, the film managed to be one of the profitable ventures of 2017. The film made on a budget of ₹ ~6 crore and collected above ₹17.5 crore worldwide.
