= Akshara Kishor =

Indian actress

- Born: Kannur, Kerala
- Other names: Baby Akshara; Balamol
- Occupation: Actress
- Years active: 2014–present
- Notable work: Balachandrika in Karuthamuthu

Akshara Kishor, credited as Baby Akshara, is an Indian child actress who predominantly works in Malayalam television soap's and films. She is known for her role as Balachandrika in the series Karuthamuthu on Asianet. In 2014, she made her debut film through Mathai Kuzhappakkaranalla, directed by Akku Akbar.

== Early life and career ==
Akshara was born to Kishor, an architect and Hemaprabha, a bank employee in Kannur. Later they shifted to Eranakulam. She has a sister named Akhila Kishor.

Akshara is well known popular for her role Balachandrika in the tele-serial Karuthamuthu which is being telecast on Asianet channel. Before coming to the limelight, she made her appearance in several advertisements in which the ads Kalayan Silks, Nirapara and Jayalakshmi are much notable. She made her debut to the Malayalam film industry in 2014 through Mathai Kuzhappakkaranalla, which is directed by Akku Akbar.

== Filmography ==
Year	Film	Role	Notes
2014	Mathai Kuzhappakkaranalla	Cameo	Debut film
2015	Kanal	Parvathy	
2015	Punchirikku Parasparam	School Girl	Short film
2016	Vettah	Angel	
2016	Hello Namasthe	Amina	
2016	Darvinte Parinamam	Girl who is seeing the angel	Cameo appearance
2016	Aadupuliyattam	Aami	
2016	Pinneyum	Revathy Purushothaman	
2016	Maravil Oral	Liya	Short film
2016	Thoppil Joppan	Rosikutty	
2016	Kachadathapa	Teacher	Short film
2017	Devayanam	Sathyabhama	
2017	Achayans	Young Prayaga	
2017	Clint	Ammu	
2017	Lava Kusha	Angel	
2018	Kamuki	Young Achaamma	
2018	Samaksham	January	
2019	Pengalila	Radhalakshmi	
2019	Oru Yamandan Premakadha	Sandra (Kunjimani)	
2019	March Rendam Vyazham	Anna	
2019	Bhayam	Allumol	
2020	Ponmagal Vandhal	Young Venba	Tamil film
2022	Eesho	Shivani	

== Television ==
Year	Show	Role	Channel	Notes
2015– 2017	Karuthamuthu	Balachandrika	Asianet	debut
2016	Onnum Onnum Moonu	Guest	Mazhavil Manorama	
2016	Comedy Super Nite	Guest	Flowers TV	
2016	JB Junction	Guest	Kairali TV	
2017	Lal Salam	Guest	Amrita TV	
2017-2018	Laughing Villa Season 2	Participant	Surya TV	
2018	Comedy Stars season 2	Participant	Asianet	
2018	Urvasi Theatres	Participant	Asianet	
2018	Laughing Villa Season 3	Participant	Surya TV	
2018	Thenum Vayambum	Lakshmi's neighbor	Surya TV	Cameo appearance
2018	Ponnonam Kunjonam	Guest	ACV	
2019	Sabarimala Swami Ayyapan	Malli	Asianet	
2020	Kuttipattalam	Herself	Surya TV	
2021	Star Magic	Participant	Flowers TV	

== Awards and nominations ==
- Won, Asianet Television awards 2016 – Best Child Artist - Karuthamuthu
- Won, 2nd Asianet comedy awards for Best child artist - Vettah, Aadupuliyattam
- Nominated, 19 th Asianet film awards for Best child artist - Aadupuliyattam, Thoppil Joppan
- Nominated, Asianet Television awards 2017– Best Child Artist - Karuthamuthu
- Kerala Film Critics Association Awards 2017 - Best Child Artist - Aadupuliyattam
- Kerala Film Critics Association Awards 2019 - Best Child Artist - Pengalila, Samaksham
