= The Tiger (2005 film) =

- Poster
- Directed by: Shaji Kailas
- Written by: B. Unnikrishnan
- Produced by: Sasi Ayyanchira
- Starring: Suresh Gopi; Gopika
- Cinematography: Shamdat
- Edited by: Don Max
- Music by: Ishaan Dev; C. Rajamani (score)
- Production company: Sri Uthruttathi Films
- Release date: December 16, 2005
- Country: India
- Language: Malayalam

The Tiger (also known as Tiger) is a 2005 Indian Malayalam-language action crime thriller film directed by Shaji Kailas and written by B. Unnikrishnan. It stars Suresh Gopi and Siddique in the lead roles, while, Sai Kumar, Gopika, Vineeth Kumar, Anand and Rajan P. Dev appear in supporting roles.

The Tiger was released on 16 December 2005 and became a commercial success at the box office alongside its Telugu dubbed version Police Samrajyam.

== Plot ==
A container packed with fake currency is stopped at the check post by Thomas Kurien, an honest senior customs officer along with city police commissioner Rajath Naidu, but is shocked to learn that Rajath himself is a part of the gang, who shoots down Kurien to save himself. Few months later, Jnanashekhara Varma, who is the DG of Vigilance Department makes a controversial press conference, in which he alleges the role of hawala transactions in the sudden rise in the crimes in the state. The statements were directly pointed at seniors in the state cabinet and police department.

Varma is summoned by the CM in the presence of Rajya Sabha MP John Varghese, and is warned of serious actions, unless he gives a proper explanation in the next couple of days. Instead of falling in line with the CM, Varma threatens him with further revelations in the coming days. The next morning, Varma is found dead in his bedroom. John Varghese is also involved in several hawala dealings taking place in the state, including terror activities. Crime Branch DIG "Tiger" Chandrashekhar is appointed to solve the mystery of Varma's death, assisted by Joseph Pothen and Sudev Sachidanand.

In the meantime, Suhara Ahmed is a young journalist who along with her close friend Kishore is found missing. She is believed to have certain sensational information regarding a minister named Vakkachan. Chandrasekhar meets her father Vivekam Ahmed Sahib, who leads him to Suhara's personal computer, which sheds light to certain truths. One day, Suhara is found in midst of a forest, critically wounded. Chandrasekhar admits her to the hospital, but her life is targeted many times. Chandrasekhar finds out shocking information regarding the anti-national activities of Vakachan along with John Varghese from Suhara's video tapes.

Vakkachan is forced to resign from the cabinet and is arrested by Chandrasekhar, who follows John Varghese to the sea port and learns about his plan to escape to Turkey. However, Varghese is stopped by Chandrasekhar, who also learns that his subordinate Sudev is none other than Musafir, an ISI agent and Varma and Kishore's killer. Sudev tries to shoot Chandrashekhar, but finds that the gun Chandrashekhar gave him had no bullets. Chandrashekhar reveals about his suspicion about the presence of a traitor when they were attacked while transporting Suhara to the hospital.

Since Sudev was the only outsider in the team, Chandrashekhar enquired about his track record and found that Sudev was present every time in the presence of Musafir was detected. In order to get concrete evidence against Sudev, Chandrashekhar secretly entered his house and managed to decrypt Sudev and Varghese's terrorism plans (which was stored in Sudev's Hard disk drive and CD's) with the help of experts, thus foiling all their plans to turn Kerala into a safe haven for terrorism. Chandrasekhar shoots down Musafir and kills John Varghese with a time bomb.

== Cast ==
- Suresh Gopi as DIG "Tiger" Chandrasekhar IPS, Crime Branch
- Siddique as MP John Varghese
- Anand as SP(fake) Sudev Sachidanand IPS / Musafir
- Saikumar as DYSP Joseph Pothan
- Gopika as Suhara Ahmed
- Rajan P. Dev as Varkeychan Narimattom, Revenue Minister
- Rajmohan Unnithan as Chief Minister of Kerala Santhosh Kurup
- Vineeth Kumar as Kishore, close friend of Suhara Ahmed
- Murali as DGP Palliserri Kovilakathu Jnanashekhara Varma IPS, Vigilance Director
- Subair as DGP Rajan Manjooran IPS, Crime Branch
- Anil Jitendra as Steven, John Varghese's right hand
- Kiran Raj as Mathew Varghese/Monayi, John Varghese's brother
- Ramu as Thomas Kurien, Customs Assistant Collector
- Kundara Johnny as Venugopal, Customs Assistant Collector
- Santosh as Rajath Naidu IPS, City Police Commissioner, Kochi City
- Janardhanan as Ahmed Sahib
- Kollam Thulasi as IG Cheriyan Thundiyil, Vigilance
- V. K. Sreeraman as C.R. Menon, Deputy Director of R&AW
- Ajith Kollam as Nasser CI of Police
- Kozhikode Narayanan Nair as Yousef Khan
- Vijayakumar as Harris Khan, Yousaf khan's grand son
- Sadiq as DCP Shakthivel IPS
- Kochaniyan as Dr. Ramachandran, Forensic Surgeon
- Balachandran Chullikkadu as Dr. Bharathan Kumar
- T. P. Madhavan as MLA Gopinathan
- Biju Pappan as Surendran, a police officer
- Augustine as Mankunnil Satish
- Kunchan as Appa, a tea shop vendor
- Santhakumari as a tea shop vendor

== Reception ==
A critic from Sify wrote that "In effect Tiger has the right mood and creates anxiety and dread essential for racy thriller. In sum the reliable Kailas-Gopi combo deliver the goods. Satisfaction guaranteed for audience who love action based investigative thrillers". A writer from Rediff.com wrote that the film was "an investigative police story that left us [the audience] unsatisfied".

== Legacy ==
One of the dialogues of Suresh Gopi "Polayadi Mone" gone trending in social media through trolls.
