= Mathai Kuzhappakkaranalla =

- Directed by: Akku Akbar
- Written by: Akku Akbar
- Produced by: Anto Joseph
- Starring: Jayasurya; Bhama; Mukesh; Lakshmi Gopalaswamy
- Cinematography: Pradeep Nair
- Edited by: Lijo Paul
- Music by: Anand Madhusoodhanan
- Production company: Anto Joseph Productions
- Release date: 28 November 2014
- Country: India
- Language: Malayalam

Mathai Kuzhappakkaranalla is a 2014 Malayalam family comedy film directed by Akku Akbar and produced by Anto Joseph. It stars Jayasurya in the lead roles while Bhama and Lakshmi Gopalaswamy play notable supporting roles.

== Plot ==
Mathai is an innocent auto driver who unnecessarily interferes into the problems of others with a good intention of solving them. The story happens on a harthal day when Mathai comes to meet his fiancée, Annamma, an advocate clerk. The film revolves around a series of incidents when he tries to solve the problems between Dr. Nandagopan and his wife, Geetha.

== Cast ==
- Jayasurya as Mathai
- Mukesh as Dr. Nandagopan
- Bhama as Annamma
- Lakshmi Gopalaswamy as Geetha
- Sreejith Ravi as Sudhan
- Adya as Radha, Sudhan's wife
- Kuyili as Sumathi, Geetha's mother
- Aju Varghese as Mathai
- Thesni Khan as Omana
- Geetha Salam as Teastall owner
- Kollam Thulasi as Menon
- Harisree Martin
- Akshara Kishor as the daughter of a separated couple

== Soundtrack ==
Mathai Kuzhappakkaranalla

Soundtrack album by Anand Madhusoodhanan
- Genre: Film
- Language: Malayalam

The film features songs composed by Anand Madhusoodhanan and written by children's story writer Sippy Pallippuram.

== Release ==
Sify stated that "Mathai Kuzhappakkaranalla? is an amateurish movie that tests your patience. Even an episode of Krishi Darshan will prove more engaging than this inane misadventure! Better to give this one a miss".
