= Letha Manasulu (2004 film) =

2004 Indian Telugu film

- VCD cover
- Directed by: S. V. Krishna Reddy
- Screenplay by: S. V. Krishna Reddy; Chintapalli Ramana (dialogues)
- Based on: Azhagi by Thangar Bachan
- Produced by: Vallabhaneni Balasouri; M. Anantha Varma
- Starring: Srikanth; Kalyani; Gopika
- Cinematography: Kanteti Sankar
- Edited by: Muthyala Nani
- Music by: M. M. Keeravani
- Production company: Sri Sivasai Pictures
- Release date: 1 October 2004
- Running time: 149 minutes
- Country: India
- Language: Telugu

Letha Manasulu (transl. Tender hearts) is a 2004 Indian Telugu-language romantic drama film directed by S. V. Krishna Reddy. The film is produced by V. Balasouri and M. Anantha Varma under Sri Sivasai Pictures. It is a remake of the Tamil film Azhagi (2002) and stars Srikanth, Kalyani, and Gopika. Raju (Srikanth) and Dhana Lakshmi (Kalyani) are childhood sweethearts who eventually marry others. When Dhana Lakshmi loses her husband, Raju pities and takes her in as a maidservant while keeping his wife Bhanu (Gopika) in the dark about their past.

The film's score and soundtrack is composed by M. M. Keeravani. Letha Manasulu was released on 1 October 2004.

== Cast ==
- Srikanth as Raju
- Kalyani as Dhana Lakshmi
- Gopika as Bhanu
- Raghunatha Reddy as Bhanu's father
- AVS
- S. S. Kanchi
- Sivaji Raja as Raju's friend
- Siva Parvathy as Bhanu's mother
- Draksharamam Saroja
- Rajeswari
- Banda Jyothi
- Krishna Chaitanya
- Narsing Yadav
- Baby Sruthi
- Master Manoj
- Baby Kavya

== Soundtrack ==
The soundtrack album consists of six singles composed by M. M. Keeravani. The audio launch was attended by Y. S. Rajasekhara Reddy, then chief minister of Andhra Pradesh. Reviewing the soundtrack album, The Hindu stated: "All the songs in the film are made rich by sensible and poetic lyrics [..] However, the singers' good rendition notwithstanding, the pronunciation by the non-Telugu artistes remains much to be desired as usual".

Tracklist
No.	Title	Lyrics	Singer(s)	Length
1.	"Tholi Tholi Korika"	M. M. Keeravani	Tippu, Madhushree	4:53
2.	"Kanula Kela"	Bhuvana Chandra	M. M. Keeravani, Bindu	4:44
3.	"Kur Ku Kooru"	Bhuvana Chandra	Shreya Ghoshal	4:06
4.	"Letha Manasaa"	Kosaraju	Sunitha Upadrashta	2:35
5.	"Thannana Thannana"	M.M. Keeravani	K. S. Chithra, M. M. Keeravani	4:59
6.	"Aanaati Mana Chelimi"	Bhuvana Chandra	M.M. Keeravani, Sadhana Sargam	5:54
Total length:				27:11

== Reception ==
Reviewing the film for The Hindu, Gudipoodi Srihari wrote: "Though neat and simple, there is nothing novel in the storyline which is akin to the narration in a novel. It is surprising to note that a popular director known for neat themes, Krishna Reddy chose a routine theme involving a man and two women." A critic from Sify termed it "Slow and dreary," and stated, "Music of Keeravani is very average and dialogues by Ramana Chintapally are adequate. On the whole is film is slow with no surprises or commercial elements." Griddaluru Gopalrao of Zamin Ryot criticised the direction and screenplay, writing that the director failed to bring any novelty to the old storyline. He added that the characterisation was poor and performances were mediocre.
