= Bhaskar the Rascal =

2015 film by Siddique

- Official theatrical poster
- Directed by: Siddique
- Written by: Siddique
- Produced by: Anto Joseph
- Starring: Mammootty; Nayanthara; Sanoop Santhosh; Anikha Surendran; J. D. Chakravarthy; Kalabhavan Shajohn
- Cinematography: Vijay Ulaganath
- Edited by: K. R. Gowri Shanker
- Music by: Deepak Dev
- Production company: Anto Joseph Film Company
- Distributed by: Popcorn Entertainments
- Release date: 15 April 2015
- Running time: 160 minutes
- Country: India
- Language: Malayalam
- Budget: ₹ 6 crore
- Box office: ₹ 25 crore

Bhaskar The Rascal is a 2015 Malayalam action comedy film written and directed by Siddique. It stars Mammootty and Nayanthara with a supporting cast of J. D. Chakravarthy, Sanoop Santhosh, Anikha Surendran, Janardhanan, Kalabhavan Shajon, Harisree Ashokan, and Saju Navodaya. The music was composed by Deepak Dev with cinematography by Vijay Ulaganath and editing by K. R. Gowri Shanker.

The film was released on 15 April 2015. The movie completed 100 days at theatres. The film was remade in Tamil as Bhaskar Oru Rascal starring Aravind Swamy and Amala Paul reprising the roles played by Mammootty and Nayanthara.

== Plot ==
Bhaskaran Pillai is a business tycoon and single parent. His father Sankara Narayanan Pillai was also a businessman once, but when his business failed and he faced financial crisis, his relatives and friends had abandoned him. His son Bhaskar was his only pillar of support. Since then, Bhaskar's sole aim has been to create and amass wealth. His business empire is the result of his hard work. Bhaskar is impatient and reacts harshly to anyone who does something against his will. This behaviour earns him the name "Rascal". Bhaskar is a widower and has a son named Aadhi, who along with Shivani study in the same school.

Bhaskar indulges in a fight at Aadhi's school, where Shivani, who is also short-tempered and aggressive like Bhaskar, witnesses the encounter and develops an admiration towards Bhaskar and is excited to meet him. Shivani's mother Hima, who is also a single parent, and Bhaskar were involved in a small fight in Aadhi's school. Bhaskar goes with Aadhi for a felicitation function, where actress Rani Kabeer is the chief guest. Rani gives an interview stating that she is in love with a businessman, who is a single parent. Bhaskar reaches the venue at the same time. This creates a confusion in the media and Bhaskar was mistaken as Rani's love interest. The reporters bombard him with questions about Rani. Bhaskar answers their questions while mistaking their questions to be about his choice of beer, a brand named "Ranika" (Ranika Beer). The statements go viral and Rani's real love interest happens to see the news and severs his ties from Rani.

Acting on the advice of his father, Bhaskar tries to set things right by meeting Rani's love interest and settling the misunderstanding. Things take a different course when Rani's love interest denies Bhaskar an audience and insults him. Bhaskar then thrashes Rani's boyfriend in his office, which is also covered by the press. In school, Aadhi is being mocked by his classmates because of his father's fiasco. Shivani tries to save Aadhi, but one of the boys twists her hand. She attacks the boy in self-defense. The boy's mother Dr. Malini makes an issue of it, but thanks to Bhaskar's timely intervention, the matter is resolved without much hassle. Bhaskar encourages Shivani to be outspoken and aggressive, but Hima dislikes it as she is a girl. She argues with Bhaskar and leaves.

Upon reaching home, Hima reveals to Shivani about how she lost her husband Sanjay Sharma. A few thugs misbehaved with Hima in a shopping mall, and she humiliated them. Sanjay does nothing, and Hima gets annoyed with him. Once Sanjay drops her off, he drives back to the place. Hima followed and saw him in a fight with them. Hima tried to stop Sanjay, but was shot by one of the thugs and died, but he manages to shoot the thug and kill him with a gun. She states that she does not want the same fate for Shivani. Malini goes to the police station to get information about Sanjay and Hima's family. Aadhi and Shivani plan to get their parents married and decide to spend time with their "new parents" - Shivani with Bhaskar and Aadhi with Hima.

Bhaskar shows some interest in Hima, but she remains indifferent and tries to avoid him on all occasions. On Shivani's birthday, a small party is organized. The only guests invited are Aadhi and Bhaskar, but a third uninvited guest appears and surprises everyone. It turns out to be Sanjay, who introduces himself to Bhaskar and Aadhi. After Sanjay was gunned down by the henchman, he was sent to a nearby hospital. The doctor plans to shift him to another hospital. Hima and her friend Manitha follow the ambulance, but to no avail. There was no patient named Sanjay admitted in the hospital. Hima discovers that Sanjay is an assassin and he had been using her to gain access to a party and had killed her friend's father, who is a scientist and had stolen a research hard disk containing locations of plutonium mines in the country.

Hima is shocked because Sanjay and Hima had ended up in an intimate relationship, which results in Hima becoming pregnant. She moved away from the city without informing anyone. Bhaskar and Hima decide to get married because of Sanjay emotionally blackmailing her. When Hima and Bhaskar were about to get married, Sanjay and his parents arrive at Hima's house where Hima leaves with Sanjay to retrieve the hard disk for him, but Sanjay plans to kill Hima. Bhaskar arrives in the nick of time and saves Hima, while Sanjay, Manitha and Sanjay's parents get killed. Hima and Shivani finally cancel their trip to Canada and reunite with Bhaskar and Aadhi.

== Cast ==
- Mammootty as Bhaskaran Pillai
- Nayanthara as Hima
- Sanoop Santhosh as Aadi Bhaskaran Pillai
- Anikha Surendran as Shivani, Hima's daughter and Aadi's friend
- Janardhanan as Sankara Narayanan Pillai, Bhaskar's father and Aadi's grandfather
- Isha Talwar as Rani Kabir, a film actress (cameo appearance)
- J. D. Chakravarthy as Sanjay Sharma, Hima's husband
- Harisree Ashokan as Driver Stensilavos
- Kalabhavan Shajon as Abdhu Razak
- Saju Navodaya as Vikraman
- Jennifer Antony as Jennifer
- Mukundan Menon as Manoj Menon Commissioner
- Chali Pala
- Abu Salim as Suresh
- Rajeev Govinda Pillai as Inspector
- Karen Mejo as Rani Kabir's daughter

== Production ==
In August 2014, the flick was titled "Rascal" and it was planned that filming will commence in December 2014 and it will be released in April the next year. Siddique said in an interview that the film would be a light-hearted comedy entertainer in his typical style. Harisree Ashokan and Janardhanan were confirmed to be cast in supporting roles. Nayanthara, was cast to play the female lead, making her return to Malayalam cinema. Nayanthara stars opposite Mammootty after Thaskaraveeran and Rappakal. Principal photography commenced on 25 December 2014.

== Reception ==
=== Critical reception ===
Bhaskar the Rascal received positive reviews from critics and audiences.

Deepa Soman of The Times of India rated the film 3 out of 5 stars and said, "A vacation release, Bhaskar The Rascal is pure escapist cinema at its best. It's not another film with morals woven into the script, hoping to see the audience in tears, but a light-hearted, slick urbane entertainer." Lauding performances of the child actors, Master Sanoop and Baby Anikha, Mythily Ramachandran of Gulf News called the film "a light-hearted entertainer".

Nelson K. Paul of Malayala Manorama rated the film 2.5 out of 5 and said, "The carelessness of Siddique, who has made us laugh to tears with his dialogues, is very palpable in this flick, unfortunately. We miss the vintage you, Siddique." A reviewer from Indiaglitz.com rated the film 7 out of 10 stars and said, "One shouldn't keep high hopes of it being unique or exceptional, since the theme and execution are quite run of the mill. However, the movie is a decent attempt at the comic genre and Siddique — Mammootty combo does strike again, added to Nayanthara's charm and grace. This is a decent comedy entertainer that can be enjoyed with the family."

Sify' called the film "a well-oiled, formula family entertainer," and wrote: "Bhaskar The Rascal may not have many surprises in store but is a nice option for sure this festival season. For all the fans of the lead stars, this could turn out to be a nice treat. Enjoy this one!" Veeyen of Nowrunning rated the film 2 out of 5 stars and said, "Siddique's 'Bhaskar the Rascal' is a film sans an internal narrative logic that hardly outweighs its jaded stereotypes. The only redeeming fact about the two and a half hour long film is the highly agreeable combination of its four lead actors — Mammootty, Nayanthara, Sanoop and Baby Anikha - all of whom desperately struggle to bring in some sense into an otherwise bizarre storyline." Pramod Thomas of The New Indian Express said, "Bhaskar the Rascal is a movie that borders on average. It's high time to get rid of the old formats and directors like Siddique should lead the change." The critic felt that the film "lacks focus, not to mention a strong theme" but also remarked: "for a hard-core Mammootty fan, it is a treat to watch."

=== Box office ===
According to the Kerala Film Distributors Association, the film earned good collections on its first day of release. In the third week, it collected around ₹13.77 crore in 19 days at the Kerala box office. The film collected ₹25 crore from Worldwide box office at its final run. The film was commercial successful at box office. The movie also completed 100 days run at the theatres, and completed more than 10,000 shows in theatres. The film was also successful at other Indian states and UAE-GCC (Gulf countries) box office.

== Soundtrack ==
Bhaskar the Rascal

Soundtrack album by Deepak Dev
- Released: March 2015
- Genre: Film soundtrack
- Language: Malayalam
- Producer: Deepak Dev

Deepak Dev chronology
| Avatharam (2015) | Bhaskar the Rascal (2015) | Lavender (2015) |

The soundtrack was released in March 2015. It comprises three songs composed by Deepak Dev. The lyrics are written by Rafeeq Ahamed and Harinarayanan. Composer Deepak Dev's daughter Devika Deepak Dev debuted as a playback singer in the film. She was hired by Siddique and sang the song "I love you mummy" with Shweta Mohan.

| No. | Title | Singer(s) | Length |
|---|---|---|---|
| 1. | "I Love you Mummy" | Shweta Mohan, Devika Deepakdev | 03:41 |
| 2. | "Manassil Ayiram" | Afsal | 05:06 |
| 3. | "Pularoli" | Vijay Yesudas | 04:04 |

=== Plagiarism controversy ===
The song "I Love You Mummy" in the film was alleged to be a copy of an Arabic song "I Love You Mamma" by Hala Al Turk. Film director Siddique stated:

Yes, the visuals are inspired from the Arabic song I Love You Mamma. However, the songs, their lyrics and music are entirely different; only the theme is the same ... I happened to watch the Arabic song, I Love You Mamma, and I felt the visuals and the setting can be used in this one as well. In fact, the situations in both the songs are similar. Like in the album, in this song sequence too the daughter is appeasing her mother when she is in distress. I got inspired after watching the video. That's it.
