= Lijo Paul =

Indian film editor

- Born: Lijo Paul; 18 October 1984 (age 41); India
- Occupation: Film editor
- Years active: 2011–present
- Spouse: Sherina Lijo

Lijo Paul (born 10 October 1984) is a Kerala State Award-winning Indian film editor who works in Malayalam films.

== Film career ==
Lijo Paul started working as an independent editor with the Malayalam film Vellaripravinte Changathi (2011). He got break in his second film Romans (2013). His work on the 2014 Malayalam film Ohm Shanthi Oshaana got him the Kerala State Film Awards for Best Editing in that year.

== Filmography ==
=== Film editor ===
Year	Film	Language
2011	Vellaripravinte Changathi	Malayalam
2012	Molly Aunty Rocks	Malayalam
2013	Romans	Malayalam
2013	Punyalan Agarbattis	Malayalam
2014	Ohm Shanthi Oshaana	Malayalam
2014	Ulsaha Committee	Malayalam
2014	Mathai Kuzhappakkaranalla	Malayalam
2015	Aadu	Malayalam
2015	Urumbukal Urangarilla	Malayalam
2015	Adi Kapyare Kootamani	Malayalam
2015	Jaadayum Mudiyum (Short Film)	Malayalam
2016	Mudhugauv	Malayalam
2016	Aakashvani	Malayalam
2016	Shajahanum Pareekuttiyum	Malayalam
2016	Annmariya Kalippilaanu	Malayalam
2016	Oru Muthassi Gadha	Malayalam
2017	Pokkiri Simon	Malayalam
2017	Aadu 2	Malayalam
2018	Johny Johny Yes Appa	Malayalam
2019	Argentina Fans Kaattoorkadavu	Malayalam
2019	Janamaithri	Malayalam
2021	Oru Thathvika Avalokanam	Malayalam
2022	Lalitham Sundaram	Malayalam
2025	The Case Diary	Malayalam
2025	Khajuraho Dreams †	Malayalam

== Awards ==
=== Kerala State Film Awards ===
- 2014 – Kerala State Film Award for Best Editor for Ohm Shanthi Oshaana
