= K. Gireesh Kumar =

Indian screenwriter in Malayalam cinema

- Occupation: Screenwriter
- Years active: 2005–present

K. Gireesh Kumar is an Indian screenwriter in Malayalam cinema.

== Films ==
Year	Films	Direction	Ref.
2004	Amrutham	Sibi Malayil	
2005	Alice in Wonderland	Sibi Malayil	
2008	Veruthe Oru Bharya	Akku Akbar	
2008	Samastha Keralam PO	Bipin Prabhakar	
2010	Oridathoru Postman	Shaji Aziz	
2011	Khaddama	Kamal	
2011	Swapna Sanchari	Kamal	
2013	Bharya Athra Pora	Akku Akbar	
2013	Pattam Pole	Azhakappan	
2014	Njangalude Veettile Athidhikal	Siby Malayil	
2017	Akasha Mittayi	M. Padmakumar	
