= Saju Navodaya =

Indian actor

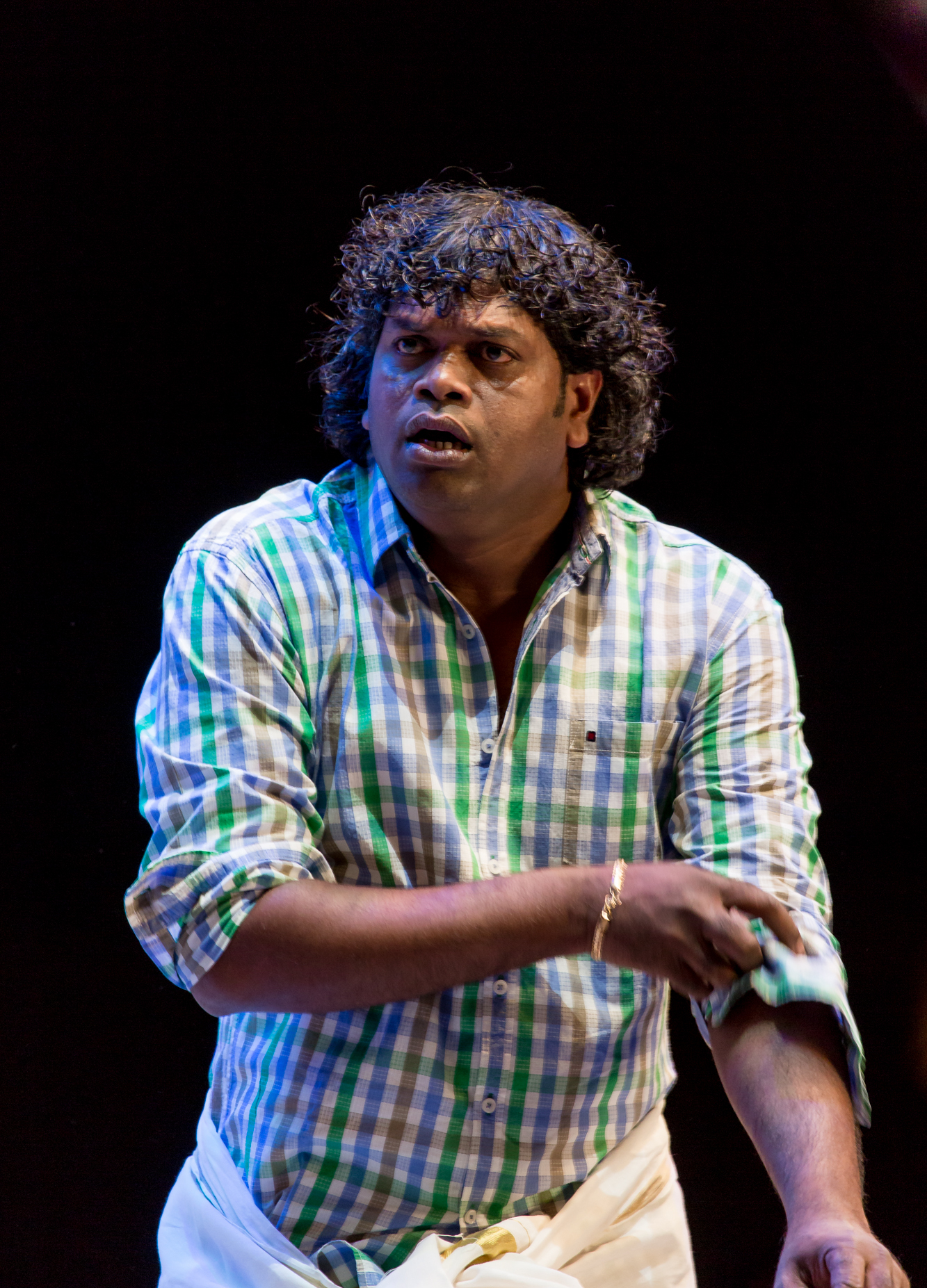
- Saju during Kairali TV event in Doha, 2016
- Born: P. T. Saju; 14 October 1973 (age 52); Udayamperoor, Ernakulam district, Kerala, India
- Other name: Pashanam Shaji
- Occupations: Actor; comedian; mimicry artist
- Years active: 2014 – present
- Spouse: Resmi

Pappanikunnel Thankappan Saju (born 14 October 1973), better known by his stage name Saju Navodaya, is an Indian actor and comedian who works in Malayalam films, television and stage. He began his career as a comedian on stage shows and later forayed into television and into films. In January 2020, he contested in the second season of Malayalam reality TV show Bigg Boss.

== Personal life ==
Saju Navodaya was born sixth among nine children to Pappanikunnel Thankappan and Manka at Udayamperoor, Kochi in Kerala, India. He did his schooling at SNDP HSS, Udayamperoor. He was a regular participant in almost all the competitions in school youth festivals. Saju has directed many dramas which won prizes in Ernakulam district level youth festivals in late 1990s. He studied at Sree Rama Varma Government Sanskrit College, Thrippunithura before starting a dance institute in Udayamperoor to teach classical and cinematic dance. He is also an ardent follower of sports and enjoys playing Cricket and Association football. He has organized and managed sports teams, sports clubs and sports events, such as cricket and football tournaments. Saju Navodaya is married to Resmi, a trained classical dancer.

== Career ==
Saju began his career as an amateur mimicry artist performing in stage shows for some local clubs and festivals in his hometown. A professional mimicry artist Manoj Guinness gave him an opportunity in his professional mimicry troupe in Kochi named Cochin Navodaya. Later on, Saju's name was changed to Saju Navodaya after associating with the troupe. He was known for imitating actors that made him a regular performer during stage shows presented by his troupe in India and abroad.

As of 2020, Saju is the Captain of the Mimicry Artists Association Fighter (MAA Fighters), a team in the Celebrity Cricket Fraternity (CCF), a Cricket league that includes film actors, directors, assistant directors, musicians, producers, choreographers, television actors, mimicry artistes, and media professionals. In January 2020, he entered as a contestant in the second season of the 15 week-long Malayalam reality television show Bigg Boss (Malayalam season 2), broadcast on Asianet and hosted by actor Mohanlal. He was elected as the Captain of the Bigg Boss house four times, in week 2, 6, 7, and 8.

== Filmography ==
=== Films ===
Key
†	Denotes films that have not yet been released

Year	Title	Role	Notes
2014	Mannar Mathai Speaking 2	Thief	
2014	Vellimoonga	Kochappy	
2014	Little Superman		
2015	Mariyam Mukku	Nazerath	
2015	Ivan Maryadaraman	Traveler in train	
2015	Bhaskar The Rascal	Vikraman	
2015	Oru Second Class Yathra	Biju	
2015	Thinkal Muthal Velli Vare	Jayadevan's Helper	
2015	Acha Dhin	Police Officer	
2015	Jamna Pyari	Sreenivasan	
2015	Utopiayile Rajavu		
2015	Life of Josutty	Rameshan	
2015	Pathemari	Narayanan's Roommate	
2015	Amar Akbar Anthony	Rejimon	
2016	Kattumakkan		
2016	Hallelooya	Uthaman	
2016	Aadupuliyattam	Saju	
2016	Marubhoomiyile Aana	Kamal's asst	
2016	Thoppil Joppan	Eldho	
2017	Achayans		
2018	Kalyanam	Panchayath Member	
2018	Ladoo	Itoope	
2018	Karinkannan	Das	Leading role
2019	Old is Gold		
2019	Prakashante Metro	Agasthi	
2019	Kochin Carnival	Nazeer	
2019	March Randam Vyazham	Bhargavan	
2019	Vattamesha Sammelanam		
2019	A for Apple		
2019	Mattoru Kadavil Kuliscene 2	Kochettan	Short film debut
2020	Panavally Pandavas	Himself	Debut as writer and director
2021	Velukkakka Oppu Ka		OTT Release
2021	Kalakaran		OTT Release
2022	Pothum Thala		
2023	Kenkemam	Rajendran	
2023	Dance Party		
2024	Blue Star	Bullet Babu	Tamil film Credited as Pashanam Shaji
2024	Once Upon a Time in Kochi		
2024	Kudumbasthreeyum Kunjadum		
2024	Prathibha Tutorials		
2024	Swargathile Katturumbu		
2026	Revolver Rinko		

=== Television ===
- Bhima Jewels Comedy Festival
- Comedy Stars season 1
- Comedy Super Nights 2
- Cinemaa Chirima
- Pashanam Shaji Speaking
- Kaliyil Alpam Kaaryam
- Tamaar Pataar
- Comedy Stars Plus
- Onam Upperi
- Nalla Best Family
- Bigg Boss (Malayalam season 2)
- Priyapetta Nattukare
- Comedy stars season 2
- Star Singer season 8
- Boeing Boeing (Web Series)
- Sura Chettai (Web Series)
- Funs Upon a time
- Wife is beautiful

=== Playback singer ===
Year	Song	Film	Co-singers	Language	Music	Notes
2016	"Manja Kattil Pokande"	Aadupuliyattam	Jayaram, Ramesh Pisharody	Malayalam	Ratheesh Vegha	

== Awards ==
Year	Organization	Category	Movie	Language	Place	Notes
2015	Ramu Karyat Film Awards	Best Comedian	Multiple movies	Malayalam	Kerala	
2016	Asianet Comedy Awards	Most Promising Actor	Multiple movies	Malayalam	Kerala	
