= Veruthe Oru Bharya =

- Theatrical release poster
- Directed by: Akku Akbar
- Written by: K. Gireesh Kumar
- Screenplay by: K. Gireesh Kumar
- Story by: K. Gireesh Kumar
- Produced by: Salahudeen
- Starring: Jayaram; Gopika; Nivetha Thomas; Innocent
- Cinematography: Shaji Kumar
- Edited by: Ranjan Abraham
- Music by: Shyam Dharman
- Production company: Cinema Kottaka
- Distributed by: Pyramid Saimira
- Release date: 11 August 2008 (India)
- Running time: 142 minutes
- Country: India
- Language: Malayalam

Veruthe Oru Bharya (transl. A Wife for Nothing) is a 2008 Indian Malayalam-language drama film written by K. Gireesh Kumar and directed by Akku Akbar. The film stars Jayaram, Gopika and Nivetha Thomas in the lead roles. It was a commercial success at the box office. The film is about the woes of Bindu, a wife and mother (Gopika) struggling with domestic chores on one hand and a controlling husband (Jayaram) on the other. The film was widely accepted by the family audience in the State, and most viewers sympathised with the predicament of women in households. The film's success resurfaced actor Jayaram's leading status in Malayalam cinema, as he had been going through several box office failures prior to it.

== Plot ==
Sugunan is a husband who habitually underestimates his wife Bindu in managing a family. Sugunan wants her only to keep house - cook food for him, iron his clothes and clean the house. Even after a long tiring day for Bindu, who does all these and more; but, there is never a word of appreciation or a compliment from her husband. He does not even acknowledge the work that she is doing without any rest in her life. This often results in quarrels between them; Bindu tolerates it for some time.

Sugunan is also indifferent (and possibly hostile) to Bindu's family - even though her father makes many attempts to get close to him. Bindu is upset at his behaviour. He shuts the electricity supply to her father's house since they were drawing power from the electrical grid, during her brother Rameshan's wedding, Bindu misunderstands.

Later, during a trip to Kodaikanal with Sugunan's friends and their wives, Sugunan does not "allow" Bindu to indulge in normal tourist activities like train rides etc. She ends the trip and they all go back to their home when Sugunan fights with two guys for telling bad things about Bindu and their daughter Anjana in a hotel where they were booking a room. Sugunan's indifferent behaviour when Bindu's mother dies drives her to a point that she is just a non-entity in her husband's life. Once Sugunan slaps her in a fit of rage, she comes up with a final decision and goes back to her house.

A boy named Sandeep persuades Anjana to go for a drive with him, and the jeep breaks down. Some thugs chance upon the hapless girl and try to molest her. Sugunan arrives there and saves her. He fights with the thugs but they attack him. The police then arrives and saves them. Slowly, Sugunan becomes a mad man thinking of his daughter's protection. He cuts the telephone wire and behaves very badly to everyone including his friends. During the time, Bindu tries to call her but the phone did not ring. Her father tells her to bring Anjana to her house. She goes to Anjana's school and finds that she did not come to the school for two weeks. She enquires Sugunan's friends then they reveals the incident happened in Sugunan's house. When they did not see Sugunan in house they put his signature for few days, and later they got caught. Bindu goes to their house with Sugunan's friends. But when Sugunan sees them, he sees them as Sandeep and the thugs who tried to attack Anjana. In the tussle that goes in the house, Sugunan hits Anjana with a stick on her head.

Alarmed by the situation, Sugunan and Bindu are reunited and live happily ever after.

== Cast ==
- Jayaram as Sugunan Raman
- Gopika as Bindu Kalyani
- Nivetha Thomas as Anjana Sugunan (Anju)
- Innocent as Rajasekharan, Bindu's father
- Suraj Venjaramoodu as Kabir
- Sivaji Guruvayoor as Chackochan
- Kalabhavan Prajod as Sunny
- Madhu Warrier as Rameshan, Bindu's brother
- Jaffar Idukki as Kuttan
- Rahman as SP Sudeep IPS
- Ganesh Kumar as Dr Cherian Paul
- Sona Nair as Tara
- Mini Arun
- Sarayu Mohan as Betty
- Mahima
- Vishal as Sandeep, Anjana's Friend
- Ambika Mohan as Headmistress

== Production ==
The film was mainly shot at various locations in Thodupuzha.

== Soundtrack ==
Music was composed by Shyam Dharman. The song "Manjil Kulikkum" was popular among the audience upon its release.

#	Song	Singer
1	Omkaram	Unni Menon
2	Muttathengum	Franco, Sowmya
3	Manjil Kulikkum	Shyam Dharman
4	Padathengango	Biju Narayanan
5	Vedham Chollum	Pradeep Palluruthy
6	Omkaram	Malavika

== Box office ==
The film was a commercial success at the box office and completed 150 days run in theatres. Made on a budget of ₹1.45 crore, it grossed a distributor's share of ₹6 crore.

== Awards ==
For her role, Nivetha Thomas received Kerala State Film Award for Best Child Artist that year.

== See also ==
- Bharya Athra Pora, 2013 Indian film, largely a sequel
