= Pavi Caretaker =

2024 Indian Malayalam comedy drama film

- Theatrical release poster
- Directed by: Vineeth Kumar
- Written by: Rajesh Raghavan
- Produced by: Dileep
- Starring: Dileep; Johny Antony; Radhika Sarathkumar
- Cinematography: Sanu Thahir
- Edited by: Deepu Joseph
- Music by: Midhun Mukundan
- Production company: Grand Production
- Distributed by: Right Release through FEOUK
- Release date: 26 April 2024
- Country: India
- Language: Malayalam
- Box office: ₹7.98 crore

Pavi Caretaker is a 2024 Indian Malayalam-language romantic comedy drama film directed by Vineeth Kumar and written by Rajesh Raghavan. It was produced by Dileep through Grand Production and stars himself in the title role. It also features Vineeth Kumar, Johny Antony, Radhika Sarathkumar, and Dharmajan Bolgatty.

It was released in theatres on 26 April 2024 to mixed reviews from critics leading to its average grosser in the box office.

== Plot ==
Pavi is an unmarried caretaker in a residential apartment in Kerala. His life changes when he forms an unexpected bond, adding joy to his routine existence in a residential complex amidst life's challenges.

Pavi spends most of his time in the building, often working double shifts including nighttime security duty to improve his financial situation. The irritating behaviours common among many middle-aged men have surfaced in him too and he's extremely nosy and believes the world revolves around him and the building. A short-tempered loner, Pavi finds solace in his pet dog, Bro, and his rented house where he sleeps during the daytime. Meanwhile, the house's owner, ex-cop Mariyamma (Radhika Sarathkumar), decides to rent out a portion of the top floor, where Pavi resides, despite his initial objections. Pavi, who has never met this person due to his night shift work, learns from Mariyamma that the tenant is a woman. He slowly begins communicating with her through notes left on their shared table, eventually developing feelings for her. However, a miscommunication leads to the woman moving out abruptly, leaving Pavi heartbroken and affecting his work performance, previously done flawlessly. Whether they will ever meet again forms the remaining part of the movie.

== Cast ==
- Dileep as Pavithran "Pavi", flat security and caretaker
- Johny Antony as Maathan, Pavi's flat security guard
- Radhika Sarathkumar as Mariyamma
- Shreya Rukmini as Janaki Vishwanathan
- Vineeth Kumar as Abhishek Krishna / Abhi, Janaki's husband
- Rosmin as Jeena
- Swathi Konde as Leena / Maya, Pavi's love interest (voiceover by Judith Ann Iype (in-person) and Anne Amie (letters only))
- Joohi Jayakumar as Malini
- Dilina Ramakrishnan as Sruthi
- Dharmajan Bolgatty as Ratheesh, Pavi's relative
- Spadikam George as Purushan TP
- Abishek Joseph George as Prince
- Jinu Ben as Jerry
- Sreepath as Appu
- Ajisha Prabhakaran as Usha
- Prof. Aliyar as Abdullah
- Indira Devi as Mollamma
- Rajesh Raghavan as Adv. Gireesh
- Rajkumar Rajasekharan
- Deepu G. Panicker as Pramosh

== Release ==
=== Theatrical ===
Pavi Caretaker was released in theatres on 26 April 2024.

=== Home media ===
The digital rights of the film has been brought by ManoramaMAX.

=== Marketing ===
Prior to release, Dileep promoted the film on the Mohanlal hosting TV show Bigg Boss (season 6). He entered the Bigg Boss House on Day 47, met the contestants and shared the details about the film in a similar appearance of a press meet.

== Reception ==
=== Critical reception ===
The film generally received mixed reviews from critics.

Anna Mathews of The Times of India rated the film 3 out of 5 stars and called it "A typical Dileep comedy". Times Now Entertainment Desk called the film "A Hardcore Dileep Showcase That Entertains" and rated it 3.5 out of 5. Latha Srinivasan of Hindustan Times wrote "It's time for Dileep to think up stories that can put him in the league of his contemporaries who are pushing the boundaries".

Anandu Suresh of The Indian Express rated the film 2 out of 5 and wrote "Vineeth Kumar's Dileep-starrer proves that both the actor and filmmakers should cease attempting to resurrect the "vintage Dileep" and instead focus on creating something fresh." Vivek Santhosh of Cinema Express rated the film 1.5 out of 5 and wrote "For someone who previously directed Dear Friend, one of the best films of 2022, Pavi Caretaker is a serious downgrade for Vineeth Kumar as a filmmaker". Gayathri Krishna of OTTPlay gave a rating of 2.5/5 and wrote "Director Vineeth Kumar's attempt to bring back the beloved old-school Dileep has, for the most part, fallen flat due to a bland and prolonged narrative."

=== Box office ===
Despite the film having very low shows on its opening day due to the Lok Sabha election, the film managed to collect ₹1.2 crore.
