= Sadanandante Samayam =

2003 film directed by Akbar

- Video cover Designed
- Directed by: Akku Akbar
- Written by: J. Pallassery; Sharathchandran Wayanad
- Starring: Dileep; Kavya Madhavan; Cochin Haneefa
- Cinematography: P. Sukumar
- Edited by: Ranjan Abraham
- Music by: Mohan Sithara
- Release date: 2 May 2003
- Running time: 152 minutes
- Country: India
- Language: Malayalam

Sadanandante Samayam (transl. Sadanandan's Time) is a 2003 Indian Malayalam-language satirical film directed by Akbar-Jose, starring Dileep and Kavya Madhavan. It was hit of the year at the box office.

== Plot ==
The movie is about Sadanandan, an ordinary school teacher and according to others, a good teacher. However, some problems always revolve around him concerning his lifestyle as he is a strong believer in astrology. If he does anything, it is according to the laws of astrology, and he cannot make a strong decision of his own as he mistrusts everything. His life takes a turn when an astrologer informs him that he will soon meet death. He panics and tries to do everything required for his wife Sumangala and daughter before he dies.

== Cast ==
- Dileep as Manakkapalli Sadanandan
- Kavya Madhavan as Sumangala, Sadanandan's wife
- Siddique as Sudhakaran, Sadanandan's elder brother
- Janardhanan as Sankara Menon, Sadanandan's uncle
- Cochin Haneefa as Headmaster Chacko
- Jagathy Sreekumar as Krishnanunni
- Sukumari as Kalyani, Sankara Menon's wife and Sadanandan's aunt
- Bindu Panicker as Devootty, Sudhakaran and Sadanandan's elder sister
  - Dimple Rose as Young Devootty
- Salim Kumar as Gopalan, Sadanandan's friend
- Maya Vishwanath as Ramani, Sudhakaran's wife
- Sadiq as Adv. Gopinathan, Sumangala's elder brother and Sadanandan's brother-in-law
- Augustine as Divakaran, Sadanandan's brother-in-law
- Unnikrishnan Namboothiri as Sadananda Menon, Sadanandan's grandfather and a noted astrologer
- T. P. Madhavan as Abdullah Master
- Reena as Sumangala and Gopinathan's mother
- Kalabhavan Shajohn as Beerankutty, Sadanandan's neighbour
- Narayanankutty as village drunkard Bhaskaran
- Machan Varghese as Insurance agent Joseph
- Jose Pellissery as Vaidyar
- Geetha Salam as Tea-shop owner Saithali
- Ambika Mohan as Nabeeesu, Beerankutty's wife
- Jija Surendran as Teacher
- Gayathri as Gopinathan's wife
- Beena Sabu as Vishukani Janu
- Nivia Rebin as the Muslim bride
- Nivedita as Kochammini
- Meena Ganesh as Vayattatti
- Ramankutty Varier As Astrologer Panicker
- Keerthana Anil as Soumya Mol, Sadanandan's daughter

== Soundtrack ==
The film's soundtrack was composed by Mohan Sithara, with lyrics penned by Yusufali Kechery.

#	Song	Singers
1	Janma Nakshathrame	K. J. Yesudas
2	Nee Arinjo (M)	K. J. Yesudas
3	Neeyarinjo (D)	K. J. Yesudas, Sujatha Mohan
4	Omalaale (D)	K. J. Yesudas, Sujatha Mohan
5	Oomalaale (M)	K. J. Yesudas
6	Souparnnika	V. Devanand
7	Tharivalakayyaalenne	Mahadevan, Vidhu Prathap

== Reception ==
A critic from Nowrunning wrote that "There is nothing new in this Dileep starrer. It's just another mandatory comedy where Dileep tries the same things which we have seen thousand times". A critic from Chithram wrote that "On the whole unless Dileep pulls up his socks, his comedy act will turn out to be a great tragedy".
