= Pranayamanithooval =

- Directed by: Thulasidas
- Written by: Kaloor Dennis; Thulasidas
- Based on: Nee Varuvai Ena (Tamil)
- Produced by: P.K.R. Pillai
- Starring: Vineeth Kumar; Gopika; Jayasurya; Harisree Asokan
- Cinematography: Anil Gopinath
- Edited by: G. Murali
- Music by: Rajamani; Mohan Sitara
- Production company: Shirdhi Sai Creations
- Distributed by: Shirdhi Sai Creations
- Release date: 18 October 2002
- Country: India
- Language: Malayalam

Pranyamanithooval is a 2002 Malayalam comedy drama romance film directed by Thulasidas, starring Vineeth Kumar and Gopika (in her film debut). In lead roles. This movie is a remake of 1999 Tamil movie Nee Varuvai Ena.

== Plot ==
The movie has three young people - Vinod, Balu and Meera - as its central characters. Vinu is a young college student and Meera is his girlfriend. Their marriage was almost fixed when Vinu died in an accident and his eyes were transplanted to Balu. Meera tries to see Balu to see Vinu's eyes, but Balu misunderstands and thinks that she loves him. Meera tells him the truth and his friends give him an idea to make Meera fall in love with him. They tell him to create a rumor that he is going to commit suicide by jumping off a building. While standing there, Balu accidentally falls and is admitted to the hospital. The doctor tells Meera that Balu is dead, but after they realize that he is alive, Meera falls in love with Balu.

== Cast ==
- Vineeth Kumar as Balagopal (Balu)
- Jayasurya as Vinod Sankar (Vinu)
- Dinu Dennis as Raju Cheriyan, Vinod's friend
- Gopika as Meera, Vinod's Love interest after balu's love interest
- Harisree Asokan as Ponnappan, Balagopal's friend
- Salim Kumar as Sundaran, Balagopal's friend
- Cochin Hanifa as Moosakka, house owner of Balagopal
- Ravi Vallathol as Vishwanath Menon, Meera's father
- T.S Raju as Sankaran Nair, Vinod's father
- Jose Pellissery as Achayan, college principal
- Sherin Tom as Reshmi
- Manka Mahesh as Subhadra, Vinod's mother
- Beena Soman as Khadeeja, Moosa's first wife
- Bindu Murali as Jameela, Moosa's second wife
- Krishna Nair as Deepa, Moosa's secret wife and mother of a baby girl
- Gayathri as Nadathara Kanakam, a drama artist
- Abhinayasree as herself
- Zeenath as Balagopal's mother
- Deepika Mohan as Meera's mother
- Thulasidas as himself

== Reception ==
A critic from Chithram wrote that "The main flaw with the film lies with the script by Kaloor Dennis".
