= Njangalude Veettile Athidhikal =

- Poster
- Directed by: Siby Malayil
- Written by: K. Gireesh Kumar
- Produced by: Milan Jaleel
- Starring: Jayaram; Priyamani; Narain; Lena
- Cinematography: Sameer Haq
- Edited by: Bijith Bala
- Music by: Ratheesh Vega; Background score: Bijibal
- Production company: Galaxy Films
- Distributed by: Galaxy Films Release (Kerala); Popcorn Entertainments (Asia Pacific)
- Release date: 23 October 2014
- Country: India
- Language: Malayalam

Njangalude Veettile Athidhikal (transl. Our home guests) is a 2014 Malayalam-language family drama film directed by Sibi Malayil produce by Milan Jaleel under his banner Galaxy Films. It stars Jayaram, after a long gap, opposite Priyamani in the lead; Priyamani has been paired up with Jayaram for the first time. Narain, Innocent, Kalabhavan Shajon, and Lena play significant roles in the film. The movie is penned by K. Gireesh Kumar. The background score and soundtrack are composed by Bijibal and Ratheesh Vega respectively. Kalabhavan Shajon debuts as a singer in the film through the song Maaye Maaye.

The film is produced by Milan Jaleel under his banner Galaxy Films. Popcorn Entertainments Australia distributed the film all over Australia, New Zealand, Singapore, and Malaysia. The film released on 23 October 2014 coinciding with the Diwali festival with mixed reviews.

== Plot ==
The film's story revolves around Advocate Manoj and Bhavana played by Jayaram and Priyamani, respectively. Their life takes a turn when their only daughter meets a tragic death. The demise of their daughter leads to a gap between them. Eventually, Bhavana will start doubting her husband of having an extramarital affair. The film then talks about some uninvited guests, who come into their life and how they influence the couple and their life.

== Cast ==
- Jayaram as Adv.Manoj
- Priyamani as Bhavana
- Narain as Rajiv Menon
- Innocent as Sreedharan
- Kalabhavan Shajon as Rajan
- Lena as Maya
- KPAC Lalitha as Manoj's mother
- Noby Marcose as Lalu
- Niyas Backar as Priyan
- Manju Pathrose as Rajani
- Antony Thekkek
- M.G. Sasi

== Critics review ==
Paresh C Palicha of rediff.com rated 2/5 stars and wrote "The film cannot be taken seriously and it turns out to be a miserable disappointment". Cochintalkies.com rated 2/5 stars and said "Watchable, But do not expect anything. A movie made out of desperation that would the exact sentence to define this movie. Njangalude Veettile Adhithikal with no doubt has a good story but mediocre script and lousy direction has ruined this movie Sify.com gave "below average" verdict and stated "There is no point in mincing words, Njangalude Veettile Adhithikal tests the patience of the viewer big time. Watch it at your own risk please!". Indiaglitz.com rated 5/10 stars and wrote "Even after with a convincing story and decent performances from the key players, the movie fails to impress, enthuse or amuse at any points of its narratives. The problem with the movie is that the whole theme is handled in an inept matter by K Gireesh kumar, whose script lines fail to bringing any impressions."

Nowrunning.com rated 1.5/5 stars and gave a "poor" verdict and wrote "From the levels of a normal family drama, the movie attempts to become a psychological thriller. Technically the movie doesn't bear the stamp of an experienced director. 'Njangalude Veettile Athidhikal' in all likelihood will struggle in theatres like uninvited guests in a party.". Unni R Nair of Kerala9.com rated 2/5 stars and said "The film seems just about OK, but fails to impress; it once again proves that it's the script that makes or mars it all. In this case the script mars it all, despite the story being convincing and the key players delivering rather decent performances. The film, on the whole, fails to impress, excite or entertain." and concluded as "Unimpressive; poor scripting mars it all....Forgettable!!!".

The Times of India rated 3/5 stars and wrote "As likely as not it deals with a subject related to a mental malady, audience see the ghost of Manichithrathazhu here and there. One also wonders why certain scenes which could have been handled better with situational comedy. Overall the film is worth a watch for the subject that Siby Malayil has tried to deal with and has its heart in the right place.".

== Music ==
Composer Ratheesh Vega's album features three tracks. One is sung by actor Shajon and the rest by newbie singers. Though it boasts of no musical novelty, it's a playlist-friendly album with one melodic fast number and two other soft melodies. Shajon debuts as a singer through singing the track Maaye Maaye penned by Santosh Varma. The song is rhythmic and has a folk feel. Mazhavil Thundu by Sanup is a melody that sets up a hazy mood. However, it reminds you of many other hit melodies here and there. The song Oru Naal is included both in the male and female version by Joju Sebastian and Anitha. Rafeeq Ahamed's lyrics for the song are also haunting and romantic.

No	Song	Singers	Lyrics	Length
1	"Maaye Maaye"	Kalabhavan Shajon	Santhosh Varma	3:34
2	"Mazhavil Thundu"	Sanup		4:27
3	"Oru Naal" (Male)	Joju Sebastian	Rafeeq Ahamed	3:48
4	"Oru Naal" (Female)	Anitha	Rafeeq Ahamed	2:27
