= Thoppil Joppan =

2016 Malayalam film

- Directed by: Johny Antony
- Written by: Nishad Koya
- Produced by: Noushad Alathur
- Starring: Mammootty; Mamta Mohandas; Andrea Jeremiah; Kaviyoor Ponnamma; Renji Panicker; Suresh Krishna
- Cinematography: Sunoj Velayudhan
- Edited by: Ranjan Abraham
- Music by: Vidyasagar
- Production companies: Grande Film Corporation; S N Group
- Distributed by: Grande Film Corporation Release
- Release date: 7 October 2016
- Running time: 130 minutes
- Country: India
- Language: Malayalam
- Budget: ₹5.5 crore
- Box office: est. ₹22 crore

Thoppil Joppan is a 2016 Indian Malayalam-language romantic comedy film directed by Johny Antony, starring Mammootty in the title role as a Kabaddi player. The film also features Mamta Mohandas, Andrea Jeremiah, Renji Panicker, Suresh Krishna, Kaviyoor Ponnamma, Harisree Ashokan, Alancier Ley Lopez, Saju Navodaya and Sreejith Ravi among others.

== Plot ==
While Joppan's friends take a bath, each of them narrates a flashback concerning Joppan. Joppan is an adept kabaddi player, and during an informal victory parade, he falls for Annie's beauty. Annie, an estate supervisor's daughter, does not initially reciprocate Joppan's feelings, but Joppan attains her love by saving her younger brother's life. Their love becomes the talk of the town and Joppan's father reprimands him. Joppan renounces his family and locals, except Annie, and assures her that he will return for her after becoming an affluent man.

In the course of time, Annie grows into a woman. Abruptly, Annie's father dies and Annie is taken to Mettupalayam by her kindred. Joppan returns to town and meets his friends. The Mercedes-Benz and the cash case are the proof of his affluent status. He asks for Annie and helplessly witnesses her marriage. Broken, he finds relief in alcohol. The friends finish the flashback and take a final dip in the lake.

Joppan brings back his kabaddi team and wins many trophies. Joppan and his friends pass the time by watching Dilwale Dulhania Le Jayenge and drinking. The vicar, a marriage broker, Joppan's mother and friends compel him to seek a bride. He at last consents but sees a girl with modern views. Later on in the parish, amidst a downpour, Maria sneaks into Joppan's umbrella and later witnesses his street duel with SI George Thomas, a law enforcement officer. Joppan and Maria then coincidentally meet each other in different ways. Joppan discovers qualities of Annie in Maria and falls for her. However, Joppan ends up helping her to elope with Thomaskutty. His friends and family believe that Joppan has married Maria, but when they acknowledge the truth, his desperate mother implores him to attend a retreat. Thus, Joppan and his friends go to a retreat centre. There, Joppan happens to meet Annie, but later discovers that she is with her fiancé, a physically challenged person. After attending Annie's marriage, Joppan angrily comes home, but is met with his mother's order to again visit a potential bride. Reluctantly, Joppan, the broker and his friends go to the girl's home and learns that the girl is Maria. She reveals that Thomaskutty was spineless and cowardly, unlike Joppan, and has left her in the church. In the climax Joppan and Maria confirm their marriage.

== Cast ==
- Mammootty as Thoppil John "Joppan" Samuel
- Mamta Mohandas as Dr. Maria
- Andrea Jeremiah as Annie, Joppan's former lover
  - Binny Sebastian as young Annie
- Kaviyoor Ponnamma as Marykutty, Joppan's mother
- Renji Panicker as Fr. James Aanakkattil
- Sudheer Sukumaran as SI George Thomas
- Harisree Ashokan as Poulose
- Alancier Ley Lopez as Pappichayan
- Saju Navodaya as Eldho
- Brijila Ragesh as Annie's friend
- Sreejith Ravi as Aravindan
- Sohan Seenulal as Mathan
- Salim Kumar as Fr. Issac Vaalamparambil
- Suresh Krishna as Roy, Annie's husband
- Mohan Jose as Retired Police Captain Kunjappan Koshy
- Jude Anthany Joseph as Thomaskutty
- Meghanathan as Lazer Mash
- Jaise Jose as Anto, Joppan's friend
- Arya Rohit as Kunjappan's daughter
- Reshmi Boban as Susamma
- Pradeep Kottayam as Chellappan
- Thesni Khan as Alice
- Akshara Kishore as Rosy Kutty
- Santhakumari as Rosy's Grandmother
- Gokulan as Balram
- Resmi Anil as Kunjumol
- Chali Pala as Stephen, Divine Center Employee
- Muhammed Fawaz as Fawu

== Production ==
The filming began in Ernakulam in April 2016. Amala Paul signed to play the lead lady. Initially Vedhika and Deepti Sati were each considered for another lead role but replaced by Mamta Mohandas. The actress announced the news via her Facebook page on May 17. Later Andrea Jeremiah replaced Amala .

== Music ==
Thoppil Joppan

Soundtrack album by Vidyasagar
- Released: 21 September 2016
- Recorded: Varsha Vallaki Studios
- Genre: Feature Film Soundtrack
- Length: 18:22
- Language: Malayalam
- Label: Satyam Audios
- Producer: VidyaSagar

Vidyasagar chronology
Uchathula Shiva (2016)	Thoppil Joppan (2016)	Jomonte Suvisheshangal (2016)

The music and background score for the film is composed by Vidyasagar, who has worked with Johny Antony in several times. The music release was coincided with an event held at Avenue Center in Kochi. The soundtrack album comprises six songs, with lyrics written by Rafeeq Ahammed and Vayalar Sarath Chandra Varma

Track listing
No.	Title	Singer(s)	Length
1.	"Thoppil Joppan"	Niranj Suresh	4:31
2.	"Onpathilage"	Jithin	1:15
3.	"Poovithalai"	K. S. Chithra	3:15
4.	"Manamilla"	Benedict Shine	1:26
5.	"Poovithalai Njaan"	Abhirami Ajai	4:18
6.	"Chil Chinchilamai"	Shweta Mohan, Madhu Balakrishnan	4:17
Total length:			18:22

== Reception ==
=== Box office ===
In Kerala, the film collected ₹1.40–2.06 crore on its opening day. By the end of its first week in theatres, the film had collected an estimated ₹3.46 crore from Kerala box office. The film collected ₹8.1 crore in 24 days from Kerala box office. The film collected ₹4.61 lakhs in its 1st weekend from US box office. The film earned ₹15.50 crore in Kerala and its final worldwide gross is ₹22 crore.

=== Critical ===
Manoj Kumar R of Indian Express rated the film three out of five and appreciated the story, performance by actors, Vidyasagar's music and its placement in film, characterisation and comedy, saying "Almost 30 minutes into the film, I realised that I have been grinning widely and frequently breaking into a laugh. And this continued till the end of the film." Rating three out of five, in a review for Manorama Online, Amrutha Menon P called the film "a rustic bundle of love and wine" and appreciated the comic performances by actors, music and story and concluded saying "Thoppil Joppan's climax may be predictable, but there too we find ample scope for fun." Calling the film "Right mix of fun, booze and romance", Aravind. K S, in a review for Deccan Chronicle, also gave a rating of three out of five and concluded, saying "Like his previous Achayan roles, Mammootty’s Joppan also will be a memorable character in his career. Actors Sohan, Alencier, Mamta Mohandas, Jude Anthany Joseph and Saju have come up with good performances. Cinematographer Sunoj and music director Vidyasagar also have backed the director to come up with a clean family entertainer."

== Awards ==
K.S.Chithra won the Asiavision Awards 2016 for Best Singer Female for the song "Poovithalai Njaan Naadha"
