= Kana Kanmani (film) =

2009 film by Akku Akbar

- VCD Cover
- Directed by: Akku Akbar
- Written by: K. Gireesh Kumar; Aku Akbar
- Produced by: Neeta Anto
- Starring: Jayaram; Padmapriya; Baby Nivedita; Biju Menon
- Cinematography: Vipin Mohan
- Edited by: Ranjan Abraham
- Music by: Shyam Dharman
- Release date: 4 September 2009
- Running time: 132 minutes
- Country: India
- Language: Malayalam

Kana Kanmani is a 2009 family comedy horror film by Akku Akbar starring Jayaram and Padmapriya. The film is a remake of the director's previous Hindi film Gauri: The Unborn (2007).

== Plot ==
Roy is a successful architect married to Maya with a daughter named Anakha alias Anu. Roy decides to take his family on a vacation to Singapore, but Anu insists that they first go to Roy's old home. They agree to go there first, stay for 4 days and then go to Singapore.

But upon arriving at the old house, Anu starts behaving strangely and soon Roy and Maya understand that she is possessed by the ghost of their unborn child Shivani, who was aborted. It was at this house both that Maya conceived Shivani and that they decided to abort the pregnancy. Shivani tells them that she is envious of the love that Roy and Maya are giving Anu and that she will kill Anu as revenge. Roy and Maya try to escape in vain. Roy calls his friend Rajeevan to his house. They all anxiously pray and wait until the time when Shivani said she would kill Anu. By that time, Shivani has changed her mind, after seeing the parent's love for Anu, and spares her life.

The movie ends with Roy and Maya accepting Shivani's presence in their world and giving her space.

== Cast ==
- Jayaram as Roy
- Biju Menon as Rajeevan
- Padmapriya as Maya
- Nivedita Vijay as Anakha (Anu)/Shivani, the ghost
- Sukumari as Akhilanda Ammal (Paati), Maya's grandmother
- Suraj Venjaramood as Bhaskaran
- Nedumudi Venu as Krishna Iyer, Maya's father
- Vijayaraghavan as Stephen, Roy's father
- Ambika as Doctor
- Reshmi Boban as Thresiamma
- Lubina as Seena
- Nandu Poduval as Sugunan, Security guard
- Baby Achu as Rajeevan's Daughter
- Geetha Nair as Maya's Mother
- Yathikumar as Brahmin Uncle
- Merlin as Brahmin Aunty
- Chali Pala as Ouseppachan, Thressyamma's husband
- Amboori Jayan as Gunda (Cameo)
- Kripa as Dancer (cameo in song Penpoovo)

== Soundtrack ==
The music was composed by Shyam Dharman, with lyrics written by Sarath Vayalar.

No.	Song	Singers	Lyrics	Length (m:ss)
1	"Aadamalle"	Biju Narayanan, Manisha Sheen	Vayalar Sarath Chandra Varma	
2	"Muthe Muthe" (D)	Sujatha Mohan, Shyam Dharman	Vayalar Sarath Chandra Varma	
3	"Muthe Muthe" (M)	Shyam Dharman	Vayalar Sarath Chandra Varma	
4	"Penpoovo"	Rakhi R. Nath	Vayalar Sarath Chandra Varma	
