= Akkamma Stalinum Pathrose Gandhiyum =

- Opening sequence
- Also known as: ASPG
- Genre: Comedy drama
- Written by: Krishna Das
- Directed by: Manu Sudhakaran
- Starring: List of cast members
- Opening theme: "Akkama stalinum pathros gandhiyum"
- Country of origin: India
- Original language: Malayalam
- No. of seasons: 1
- No. of episodes: 129

Production
- Producer: Teza Creations
- Running time: 22 minutes

Original release
- Network: Asianet
- Release: 5 January – 3 July 2015

Akkamma Stalinum Pathrose Gandhiyum is a 2015 Indian comedy television series that aired from 5 January 2015 and 3 July 2015 for 129 episodes on Asianet. Veena Nair and Shaju played the title characters. The series was telecast from Monday to Thursdays. The show ended after six months and was replaced by the horror series 7 Rathrikal. This is rebroadcast in Asianet Plus.

== Plot ==
The story revolves around the journey of a married couple Akkamma Stalin and Pathros Gandhi who differ on their political views: Akkamma is a communist, Patros is a congressman. The story highlights different types of political parody happening in Kerala and the view of the characters on it.

== Cast ==
- Veena Nair as Akkamma Stalin
- Kalabhavan Shaju as Pathrose Gandhi
- Aadil Mohammed as Nehru Lenin
- Vijayakumari as Mariyamma
- Binny George as Anna
- Azees Nedumangad as Appukuttan (Akkama's political man)
- Geetha Salam as OudhaKutty
- Solomon (not found)
- Binny John as Anna

== Awards ==
Won-Asianet Television Awards 2015

- Best Comedy Serial
