= Aandavan (2008 film) =

2008 Malayalam-language film directed by Akbar Jose

- Directed by: Akbar Jose
- Starring: Kalabhavan Mani; Sindhu Menon; Jagathy Sreekumar
- Cinematography: Vipin Mohan
- Edited by: Ranjan Abraham
- Music by: Alex Paul
- Distributed by: Kalasangham Films
- Release date: 16 May 2008
- Country: India
- Language: Malayalam

Aandavan is an Indian Malayalam-language film directed by Akbar Jose and starring Kalabhavan Mani, Sindhu Menon and Jagathy Sreekumar. The film was telecasted on Mazhavil Manorama.

== Plot ==
This movie revolves around Aandavan alias Murugan, a thief from the slum of Cochin who robs from a corrupt business tycoon Parameshwara Panicker. Soon, SI Sreerekha is appointed to capture him.

== Cast ==
- Kalabhavan Mani as Aandavan (Murugan)
- Sindhu Menon as SI Sreerekha
- Jagathy Sreekumar as Kavungal Parasmeshwara Panicker
- Salim Kumar as Mayinkutty
- Irshad as Constable Rameshan
- Bijukuttan as Bhaskaran
- Indrans as Chandran
- Seema G. Nair as Sarasu
- Kulappuli Leela as Mariyamma
- Narayanankutty as Narayankutty
- Anand as CI Sadashiva Panicker
- Besant Ravi as Tyson George (Georgekutty)
- Chali Pala as SI Gangadharan
- Ponnamma Babu
- T. S. Raju as Velayudhan
- Boban Alummoodan
- Priyanka
- Nivia Rebin

== Reception ==
Nowrunning wrote that "Aandavan is as formulaic an action flick as has ever graced the silver screen. It's in reality a series of pointless fights, murders, verbal aggression and plenty of bloodshed frantically on the hunt for an interesting storyline". Indiaglitz wrote that "`Aandavan' is a regular Kalabhavan Mani affair -yet another take which glorify one-man vigilant justice. And as usual with his films, this too remains unsurprising and predictable to the core. In an obvious attempt at making a formulaic masala movie, the creators come up with another that turns out far from satisfactory".
