= Mani Koya Kurup =

- Directed by: S. S. Devadas
- Written by: Vijayan Karote
- Screenplay by: Vijayan Karote
- Produced by: P. P. Jose
- Starring: Alummoodan; Jayakala; K. P. Ummer; Kuthiravattam Pappu; Padmapriya
- Cinematography: G. Vittal Rao
- Music by: M. S. Viswanathan
- Production company: Rajesh Films
- Distributed by: Rajesh Films
- Release date: 13 May 1979
- Country: India
- Language: Malayalam

Mani Koya Kurup is a 1979 Indian Malayalam-language film, directed by S. S. Devadas and produced by P. P. Jose. The film stars Alummoodan, Jayakala, K. P. Ummer Kuthiravattam Pappu and Padmapriya. The film has musical score by M. S. Viswanathan.

== Cast ==
- K. P. Ummer
- Vincent
- Alummoodan
- Kuthiravattam Pappu
- Lalu Alex
- Thikkurissy Sukumaran Nair
- Jayamalini
- Padmapriya
- Philomina
- Sadhana
- Geetha Salam

== Soundtrack ==
The music was composed by M. S. Viswanathan and the lyrics were written by P. Bhaskaran.

No.	Song	Singers	Lyrics	Length (m:ss)
1	"Aadyachumbanalahari"	K. J. Yesudas	P. Bhaskaran	
2	"Anthiyilam"	K. J. Yesudas, P. Jayachandran	P. Bhaskaran	
3	"Aruthe Aruthe"	Vani Jairam	P. Bhaskaran	
4	"Chadukudu Chadukudu"	S. Janaki, P. Jayachandran	P. Bhaskaran	
