= Mazhathullikkilukkam =

- Directed by: Akku Akbar
- Written by: Shailesh; Divakaran; J. Pallassery
- Produced by: Sharada
- Starring: Dileep; Navya Nair; Sharada; Bharathi
- Cinematography: P. Sukumar
- Edited by: Ranjan Abraham
- Music by: Suresh Peters
- Production company: Sharada Productions
- Distributed by: Sargam Speed Release
- Release date: 15 February 2002
- Country: India
- Language: Malayalam

Mazhathullikkilukkam (transl. Jingle of rain drops) is a 2002 Indian Malayalam-language comedy-drama film directed by the Akbar-Jose duo (in their directorial debut). The film stars Dileep, Navya Nair, Sharada and Bharathi. The movie was produced by Sharada under the banner of Sharada Productions and was distributed by Sargam Speed Release. It was a commercial success.

== Plot ==
The story starts when Soloman and his sister travel to Kannadahalli, a village in Karnataka to meet two retired teachers. He reaches the house on top of a hill - "Swargam", where he finds the two old women, who live along with a cook and a home nurse who look after them. Anna John and Alice are sisters who are spinsters and they own the huge estate. The home nurse Sofiya, the cook, cook's son and the priest are the only people close to them. Soloman takes charge as the manager of the estate and soon wins over the two oldies.

He realizes that they are two angels and he tries to bring back joy into their morbid life. Soon, Soloman becomes the apple of their eye and they both consider him as their own son. Meanwhile, he falls in love with Sofiya with whom he had regular fights. Their wedding is fixed and the sisters give away all their wealth to both of them. Sofiya reveals to Soloman that her brother Sabu was a photographer who got murdered by some drug addict students.

Then during a flashback it is revealed, Soloman has a dark and disturbing past. Soloman is actually falsely accused in a murder case of a photographer and is hiding from the police. The photographer was revealed to be Sabu. Soloman is filled with guilt and decides to leave the place on the pretext of higher education abroad. Sophiya overhears a conversation between Soloman and his sister Treesa. Unaware of all this, Soloman goes to the teachers and insists on them having payasam from him.

Meanwhile, a very guilty Sofiya confesses to the priest about what she heard and that she had poisoned Soloman's payasam, in order to avenge her brother's death. Just then Soloman visits the priest and learns all this. Soloman rushes back only to find the two teachers dead. Soloman takes the punishment for Sophie and when he comes out he goes to the tombs of Anna and Alice where he meets Sofiya. The story ends with them deciding to live together.

== Cast ==
- Dileep as Soloman
- Navya Nair as Sofiya
- Sharada as Anna John (voiceover by Anandavally)
- Bharathi Vishnuvardhan as Alice John
- Nedumudi Venu as Father Palaykkal
- Cochin Haneefa as Mathukkutty
- Salim Kumar as Mayandi
- Sukumari as Kikkili Chethathi
- Boban Alummoodan as Sabu
- Machan Varghese as Kuriakose
- Kozhikode Narayanan Nair as Father Ignetious
- Jose Pellissery
- Narayanankutty
- Manoj Guinness as Horse Cart Rider
- Suvarna Mathew as Treesa

== Soundtrack ==
The songs in the movie has been composed by Suresh Peters with lyrics by R. Rameshan Nair. The Background score has been done by Ouseppachan. The songs were distributed by Super Star Audios.

#	Track Titles	Singer
1	"Kinavinte"	Viswanath
2	"Therirangum Mukile"	P. Jayachandran
3	"Velippenninu Thaalikku"	Srinivas, Sujatha Mohan
4	"Puthuvettam Thedi Vannu"	M. G. Sreekumar
5	"Ravinte Devahrudayathil"	K. J. Yesudas
6	"Swargam Nammude"	Vidhu Prathap
7	"Ravinte Devahrudayathin"	Chithra Sriram

== Reception ==
A critic from Nowrunning wrote that "The directors Akbar and Jose has tried to build the story around Dileep's comedy image, but the comedy track of Cochin Haneefa and Salim Kumar combination has come out with some stale jokes, which have already been seen in many other films. But the highlight of the film is Sarada and Bharathi, who are simply fantastic stealing the show from Dileep and others". A critic from Cinesouth wrote that "The film is a perfect mixture of comedy and sentiments. It moves at a very realistic pace. 'Mazathulikilukkam' is a perfect entertainer from Akbar-Jose. A film targeted at the ordinary movie goers".
