= Azhagi (2002 film) =

- Poster
- Directed by: Thankar Bachan
- Based on: "Kalvettugal" by Thankar Bachan
- Produced by: Udhaya Geetha
- Starring: R. Parthiban; Nandita Das; Devayani
- Cinematography: Thangar Bachan
- Edited by: B. Lenin; V. T. Vijayan
- Music by: Ilaiyaraaja
- Production company: Uthaya Geetha Productions
- Release date: 14 January 2002
- Running time: 147 minutes
- Country: India
- Language: Tamil

Azhagi (Note: The film is titled as CBFC certificate and title card as Udhaya Geetha's Azhagi.) (transl. Beautiful lady) is a 2002 Indian Tamil-language romantic drama film written and directed by Thankar Bachan in his directoral debut, based on his short story "Kalvettugal". The film stars R. Parthiban, Nandita Das (in her Tamil debut) and Devayani. It was released on 14 January 2002 and won the Filmfare Award for Best Film – Tamil. The film was remade in Telugu as Letha Manasulu in 2004.

== Plot ==
Shanmugam, a veterinary doctor, lives in the city with his wife Valarmati and their two children. In school, Shanmugam was in love with his classmate Dhanalakshmi, but fate had forced them to go their separate ways, with Dhanam being forced to wed her brother-in-law (Sayaji Shinde). One day, Shanmugam spots Dhanam, who, having lost her husband, now lives a life of poverty on the platforms with her son Balu. After an unsuccessful attempt to find her a job in a friend's house, he hires her as their servant-maid. However, memories of the past start to create a tension between Shanmugam and Dhanam, despite their attempts to maintain a distance.

One day, Valarmati finds out from Shanmugam's old classmates how her husband and Dhanam were in love when they were young, and she starts fearing that Shanmugam might leave her and her children for Dhanam. Valarmati becomes so distraught that she even humiliates Dhanam at a party organised by one of their friends. When they return home, Valarmati confronts Shanmugam, and an argument ensues. Dhanam overhears their argument and silently goes to bed. The next morning, Dhanam and Balu are nowhere to be found. When Shanmugam searches the house, he finds a letter written by Dhanam, saying that she wants Valarmati and Shanmugam to be happy and doesn't want to come between them. Soon, Valarmati realises the truth and wants to bring Dhanam back home and ask her for her forgiveness.

Shanmugam searches everywhere for them and at last finds Balu in an orphanage. The matron informs them that his mother had left instructions that her son should remain at the orphanage till her return. However, when the matron questions Balu, he replies that he wants to go with Shanmugam and stay in their house and to tell his mother that he is there when she returns. The matron agrees and lets him go. At the ending of the movie, it is mentioned that Balu has been adopted by Shanmugam but still continues to call him "Sir" and never "Father or "Dad". As Shanmugam leaves for home from the orphanage, he mentions that he is still searching for Dhanam's whereabouts to that day.

== Cast ==
- R. Parthiban as Shanmugam
  - Ramu Saravanan as little Shanmugam
  - Sathish Stephen as young Shanmugam
- Nandita Das as Dhanalakshmi aka Dhanam (Voice dubbed by Savitha Radhakrishnan)
  - Shruthi as little Dhanalakshmi aka Dhanam
  - Monica as young Dhanalakshmi aka Dhanam
- Devayani as Valarmathi (Voice dubbed by Jayageetha)
- Vivek as Veterinary Doctor Desingu
- Sayaji Shinde as Gothandam
- Pandu as Shanmugam's assistant
- Loose Mohan as Pandu's father-in-law
- Pyramid Natarajan as Natarajan
- Elango Kumaravel as Kaakaiyan
- Vennira Aadai Moorthy as Sundaralingam
- George Maryan as Maths Teacher

== Soundtrack ==
The music was composed by Ilaiyaraaja.

Song	Lyrics	Singer(s)
"Paattu Solli Paada Solli"	Ilaiyaraaja	Sadhana Sargam
"Damakku Damakku Dum"	Palani Bharathi	Bhavatharini, Chorus
"Un Kuthama En Kuthama"	Ilaiyaraaja	Ilaiyaraaja
"Oru Sundari Vandhalam"	Karunanithi	P. Unnikrishnan, Sadhana Sargam, Malgudi Subha
"Oliyile Therivadhu Devadhaya"	Ilaiyaraaja	Karthik, Bhavatharini
"Kuruvi Kodanja"	Palani Bharathi	Pushpavanam Kuppusamy, Swarnalatha

== Release and reception ==
Azhagi was released on 14 January 2002, Pongal day. Sify wrote "Azhagi is a much talked about film, as it promises to usher in good cinema. The debutant director of the film is Thankar Bachchan, who has made a name for himself as one of the best cinematographers in Tamil. Visual Dasan of Kalki appreciated the film's plot and direction for realism while also praising the music, cinematography and performances of lead artistes. Malathi Rangarajan of The Hindu wrote, "The sensitivity with which emotions have been portrayed, speaks volumes of the capabilities of director Thankar Bachchan who has already made a mark as a meritorious camera person".

== Accolades ==
Azhagi won the Filmfare Award for Best Film – Tamil. At the 49th National Film Awards, Sadhana Sargam won the award for Best Female Playback Singer for the song "Pattu Solli". At the 2002 SICA Awards, the film won in three categories: Best Actress (Nandita Das), Best Director (Thangar Bachan) and Best Music Director (Ilaiyaraaja).

== Legacy ==
G. Dhananjayan in his book Pride of Tamil Cinema said, "A trendsetting film shows how childhood love remains in the hearts of people even after they have grown up and settled in their adult lives. It made a deep impact among the audience and aspiring film makers".

== Bibliography ==
- Dhananjayan, G. (2014). Pride of Tamil Cinema: 1931–2013. Blue Ocean Publishers. OCLC 898765509.
