= Bharya Athra Pora =

- Directed by: Akku Akbar
- Written by: K Gireesh Kumar
- Produced by: Anto Joseph
- Starring: Jayaram; Gopika
- Cinematography: Jibu Jacob
- Edited by: Lijo Paul
- Music by: Shyam Dharman
- Production company: AJ Film Company
- Release date: 3 May 2013
- Running time: 150 minutes
- Country: India
- Language: Malayalam
- Box office: 10 crores

Bharya Athra Pora (transl. Wife is not that good) is a 2013 Malayalam family film directed by Akku Akbar, starring Jayaram and Gopika in the lead roles. The cast and crew of 2008 film Veruthe Oru Bharya came together to make the film, although it is not a sequel to the first. The film was a commercial success. It marked Gopika's comeback and remains her last film to date too.

== Plot ==
Bhaskaran alias Bhas, a fourteen-year-old boy runs way from the police and collapses. He gets hospitalised and reveals his flashback to a doctor Augustine. Bhaskaran tells about his father Satyanathan who is a teacher at Vivekodayam Higher Secondary School and his mother Priya, is a bank employee. Satyanathan is an alcoholic. After school hours, he can be seen with his friends in the local bar or at thekkinkad maithanam where they play cards. He is dissatisfied with his life and wife. He befriends some young men of the new generation whose lifestyle tempts him. During an outing to a beach, he reveals to his newly formed friends that he is in love with a girl called Neena Kuruvila whose thoughts and personality match his.

Priya learns of this while logging on to his Facebook account without his knowledge. She then tells her close friends who suggest she take him to a rehabilitation center. Priya is not interested in any experiments and is disgusted with his behaviour. She files a joint petition for divorce and both sign it. They decide to live separately until the six months given by the court to settle for their divorce. Satyanathan decides to live on the first floor and Priya lives on the ground floor with Bhaskaran. After some time, he notices a man dropping by to see Priya every day and becomes jealous. One day, Neena decides to meet Satyanathan at the beach side. She asks for four lakh rupees as help and flirts with him. He gives her the money, not realizing that it's a trap. Later on, Satyanathan realizes that she is fake and has been taking money from many men outside and doing illicit affairs when the news about a raid flashes on TV.

Bhaskaran sexually abuses his female autistic friend Neha and saves it in a pen drive. Priya discovers that her son is a porn addict and Sathyanathen also finds it and thrashes him. Finally, Dr. Augustine brings Bhaskaran back to his house where he sees Neha and breaks down. Satyanathan consoles him. At the family court, Priya and Satyanathan get divorced and expect them to change while living in the same house but separately. Satyanathan and Bhaskaran take an oath that they will change for good and Priya will return to them.

== Cast ==
- Jayaram as Sathyanathan Nair
- Gopika as Priya Sathyanathan
- Master Ken Sanal as Bhaskaran Sathyanathan/Bhas
- Aju Varghese as Jilan
- Balachandran Chullikkad as Rajendran
- Molly Kannamally as Thandamma
- Siddique as Dr. Rahman
- Sunil Sukhada as Sunil Menon, Principal
- Jayaraj Warrier as Anil, Sathyanathan’s friend
- Anwar Sherif as Jilan's friend
- Majeed as Dr. Augustine
- Sivaji Guruvayoor as Advocate Chellappan Kumar
- Reena Basheer as Zeenath
- Ambika Mohan as Family Court Judge
