= Aadupuliyattam =

- Poster
- Directed by: Kannan Thamarakkulam
- Written by: Dinesh Pallath
- Produced by: Haseeb Haneef; Noushad Alathur
- Starring: Jayaram; Om Puri; Ramya Krishnan; Akshara Kishor; Sheelu Abraham; Sampath Raj; Ramesh Pisharody
- Narrated by: Siddique
- Cinematography: Jithu Damodar
- Edited by: Sandeep Nandakumar
- Music by: Ratheesh Vegha
- Production company: Grande Film Corporation
- Distributed by: Anto Joseph Film Company
- Release date: 20 May 2016
- Country: India
- Language: Malayalam

Aadupuliyattam (transl. lambs and tigers game) is a 2016 Indian Malayalam-language horror film directed by Kannan Thamarakkulam and written by Dinesh Palleth, starring Jayaram, Om Puri, Ramya Krishnan, Sheelu Abraham, Akshara Kishor, Saju Navodaya, Ramesh Pisharody and Sampath Raj in lead roles. The major filming locations are Palani and Thodupuzha. Film released on 20 May 2016. The horror thriller film is dubbed in Tamil as Shenbaga Kottai and Telugu as Mathangi and Hindi as Mera Badla - Revenge 2. The film was a commercial success at the box office.

== Plot ==
The film starts showing a prince falling in love with a woman named Chempakam. Later, the prince is defeated in a war and he escapes to a palace where Chempakam resides (Chempakakotai). Chempakam, tells the prince that he cannot be captured by anyone as long she is there because she has some special powers and then cuts her throat. From there on, whoever enters Chempakakotai area will be killed by a supernatural power. The king spent nights alone in the palace with Chempakam's spirit until his death.

The story then shifts to the lives of Sathyajith, his wife Amala and his daughter Aami. Satyajith is a wealthy businessman who is haunted by some visions. On his psychiatrist's advice, he meets a yogi named Yogendra Muni.

Yogendra Muni tells him that the property, Chempakakottai, which he bought 2 years ago, is the reason for his visions and that some spirits are waiting to take revenge against him by killing his family and friends. He also says that soil taken from four corners of the kottai should be brought to him. Satyajith sends his friend to take the soil. Although his friend who does not believe in ghosts manages to get the soil, he is brutally beaten up and put in the ICU by a supernatural power. Satyajith takes the soil to the yogi who puts it with some statues in three bags. He tells Satyajith to take the two bags to a priest and a musalyar while the third one is left with him. Later, the yogi asks him to stay in the house before the next full moon, 13 days from then as the spirit gets full powers on that day. Yogendra Muni gives them a raksha to be buried in front of the house. Satyajith and his friends go to Chempakakotai.

In a flashback scene, Satyajith and his friends are shown to be fraudsters. After gathering lot of money, they go stay in Chempakakotai. There, Satyajith falls in love with a woman named Mathangi who has a daughter named Malli. Satyajith is seen to protect Mathangi and Malli from a man named Aadhishwaran who wants to marry Mathangi. Satyajith marries Mathangi. In the Chempakakotai, Mathangi waits for first night with Sathyajith. But, Aadhishwaran arrives instead, and reveals to Mathangi that he had a deal with Sathyajith. Aadhishwaran would help Satyajith to take away the fort in exchange for Mathangi. Aadhishwaran chases Mathangi, but she escapes away with Malli. Then Satyajith comes with his friends and locks the Chempakakotai doors and sets fire to Mathangi's house. For this, Sathyajith gets lot of money from a minister. That night, Sathyajith and his friends tries to celebrate but Sathyajith gets sad as he now feels that he shouldn't have cheated Mathangi. Next day, Sathyajith asks Aadhishwaran for Mathangi, who tells him that she ran away. Mathangi and Malli are shown to be trapped inside Chempakakotai without food and water. Malli dies from hunger. Later, Sathyajith comes to Chempakakkotai in search for Mathangi and finds Malli dead and darkened with Mathangi sitting close immobile. Sathyajith digs the grave, while this time Aadhishwaran comes and tells he will dig the grave as he only loved Mathangi but Sathyajith never loved Mathangi.

In present day, Sathyajith resides Amala and Aami. Meanwhile, Malli's ghost kills one of Sathyajith's friend Appu in a car crash and explosion. Sathyajith and his family starts to live in Chempakakotai. Aami gets possessed by Malli's ghost. Yogendra Muni tells that only Mathangi can calm Malli's ghost, and she is still alive. Sathyajith and Aami goes to Aadhishwaran's house for Mathangi. A fight happens when Aadhishwaran doesn't want Mathangi to be taken away. Aadhishwaran tells Mathangi is tied up because she is mad. Sathyajith accuses Muthu for telling lies regarding Mathangi. Mathangi tells Satyajith that she acted mad and waited till this time in the hope of meeting Satyajith to ask why he cheated her and Malli. Mathangi finally agrees to come when Amala tells her that her child is innocent for the cheating from Sathyajith.

At Chempakakotai, upon seeing Mathangi, Malli tells she wants revenge as she was cheated. Now a Yaga with full swamy around start mantras. Mathangi takes the plate in which bone pieces of Malli is put, and puts it in fire. Mathangi dies there itself. Now, Sathyajith is safe as Aami is now normal with Amala. The film ends showing Mathangi and Malli spirit together ascend up to sky.

== Cast ==
- Jayaram as Sathyajith
- Om Puri as Yogendra Muni
- Ramya Krishnan as Mathangi, Malli's mother (Mahishwari in Hindi version)
- Sheelu Abraham as Amala, Sathyajith's wife and Aami's mother
- Ramesh Pisharody as Sunny
- Saju Navodaya as Saju
- Akshara Kishor as Aami, Sathyajith's and Amala's daughter
- Aangelina Abraham as Malli, Mathangi's daughter (Mallika in Hindi version)
- Sampath Raj as Aadhishwaran
- Siddique as Psychiatrist/Narrator
- S. P. Sreekumar as Appu
- Pradeep Kottayam as Kunju Narayanan (a journalist)
- Valsala Menon as a Black magician
- Thampi Antony as Father Arun Mouli
- Veena Nair as Jyothi (Appu's wife)
- Amritha Meera Vijayan as Chempakam
- Mamta Mohandas as Singer (cameo appearance)

== Production ==
The film is directed by Kannan Thamarakkulam which is a "horror comedy". Jayaram was selected in the leading role along with Om Puri and Ramya Krishnan in other pivotal roles. Jayaram used a salt and pepper hair style in the film which was suggested by his son Kalidas Jayaram. Sheelu Abraham is playing the female lead, the role which was initially offered and rejected by Jewel Mary, Sheila Kaur, and Asha Sarath.

The film's pooja ceremony was held in November 2015 at Thodupuzha, Kerala.

== Music ==
Aadupuliyattam

Soundtrack album to Aadupuliyattam by Ratheesh Vegha
- Released: 6 April 2016
- Recorded: Ratheesh Vega Studios
- Genre: Feature film soundtrack
- Length: 15:48
- Language: Malayalam
- Label: East Coast Audios
- Producer: Ratheesh Vegha

Ratheesh Vegha chronology
Picket 43 (2015)	Aadupuliyattam (2016)	Marubhoomiyile Aana (2016)

The soundtrack and background score was composed by Ratheesh Vegha. The soundtrack comprising 4 tracks was released on 6 April 2016 by East Coast Audios. The release coincided with a promotional event held at the Adlux International Convention & Exhibition Centre in Angamaly, Kochi.

All lyrics are written by Kaithapram Damodaran Namboothiri, Mohan Rajan, Harinarayanan.

Aadupuliyattam (Original Motion Picture Soundtrack)
No.	Title	Lyrics	Singer(s)	Length
1.	"Vaalmuna Kannile"	Kaithapram Damodaran Namboothiri	Jayachandran	4:04
2.	"Karuppana Kannazhaki"	Mohan Rajan	Mamta Mohandas, Ratheesh Vegha	4:19
3.	"Chilum Chilum"	Harinarayanan	Rimi Tomy, Najim Arshad	6:00
4.	"Manja Kattil Pokande"	Traditional	Jayaram, Ramesh Pisharody, Saju Navodaya	1:25
Total length:				15:48

== Release and reception ==
Aadupuliyattam released on 20 May 2016 in 70 centers across Kerala.

=== Box office ===
The film collected around ₹15.42 crore (US$1.6 million) within 50days from Kerala box office. The film was commercial success.

=== Post-release ===
Soon after the release, it was announced that a percentage of the film's gross profit will be shared with the family of 'Jisha', a Dalit girl from Perumbavoor who was brutally raped and killed in 2016.
