= Gauri: The Unborn =

- Directed by: Akku Akbar
- Written by: Mohan Azaad; K. Gireesh Kumar
- Produced by: R. Mohan
- Starring: Atul Kulkarni; Rituparna Sengupta; Anupam Kher
- Cinematography: Viswamangal Kitsu
- Edited by: K. Ravi Kumar; Kiran Rajput
- Music by: Raju Singh
- Production company: Shogun Films
- Release date: 30 November 2007
- Running time: 98 min
- Country: India
- Language: Hindi

Gauri: The Unborn is a 2007 Indian Hindi-language horror film directed by Akku Akbar, starring Atul Kulkarni and Rituparna Sen Gupta. The film was produced by Shogun Films. In 2009, Akku Akbar himself remade the film in Malayalam as Kana Kanmani.

== Plot ==
Sudeep (Atul Kulkarni) and Roshni (Rituparna Sengupta) are a happy-go-lucky couple who have a school-going child, Shivani (Rushita Pandya), and lead a happy life in the suburbs of Mumbai. One day, during a sports event at school, Shivani accidentally slips and falls to the ground, unknown to her and her mother that an invisible entity was responsible for the fall. Since the incident, Shivani has begun behaving quite stubbornly. Nevertheless, the family takes no heed to the change and moves on.

Meanwhile, Sudeep's company promotes him and offers him a business trip to any place he desires. Though Sudeep and Roshni decide on Mauritius, Shivani insists that they should visit their ancestral home first, which surprisingly Shivani had never seen or visited before. After much persuasion, the family decides to visit the ancestral home for just a few days and then go to Mauritius. When they reach, Roshni and Sudeep observe Shivani's behaviour becoming more erratic and stubborn. During this time, supernatural events occur in the house.

To their horror, the couple discovers that the reason for Shivani's strange behaviour was due to an evil entity that had possessed her. Through this entity, a series of flashbacks revealed that before Shivani, Roshni and Sudeep had an unplanned pregnancy which ended in abortion within three months. The entity revealed itself to be Gauri, the name the couple had given had their first child been a girl. Through Shivani, Gauri told them that she was jealous of the love and affection they were giving to Shivani, and as revenge for killing her, within three days she would kill Shivani on the third night.

The couple tries many attempts to protect Shivani from the clutches of Gauri but fails every time while Gauri teases the couple with supernatural attacks. On the third night, they pray anxiously for Shivani's life, even requesting Gauri to leave Shivani's body. However, Gauri does not harm or kill Shivani because she realised that her parents had and will not provide the kind of love to her as that of Shivani's. While bidding a tearful goodbye, Gauri's final wish was that if she ever felt scared, she'd like to be around her parents for a short while. The couple accepted her wish and since then have accepted Gauri's presence in their lives.

== Cast ==
- Atul Kulkarni as Sudeep "Deepu"
- Rituparna Sengupta as Roshni "Roshu"
- Rushita Pandya as Gauri/Shivani
- Mohan Azaad as Sameer "Sam"
- Anupam Kher as Paapa (Sudeep's dad)
- Mansi Pritam as Neena
