= Vineeth Kumar =

Indian Malayalam actor, director

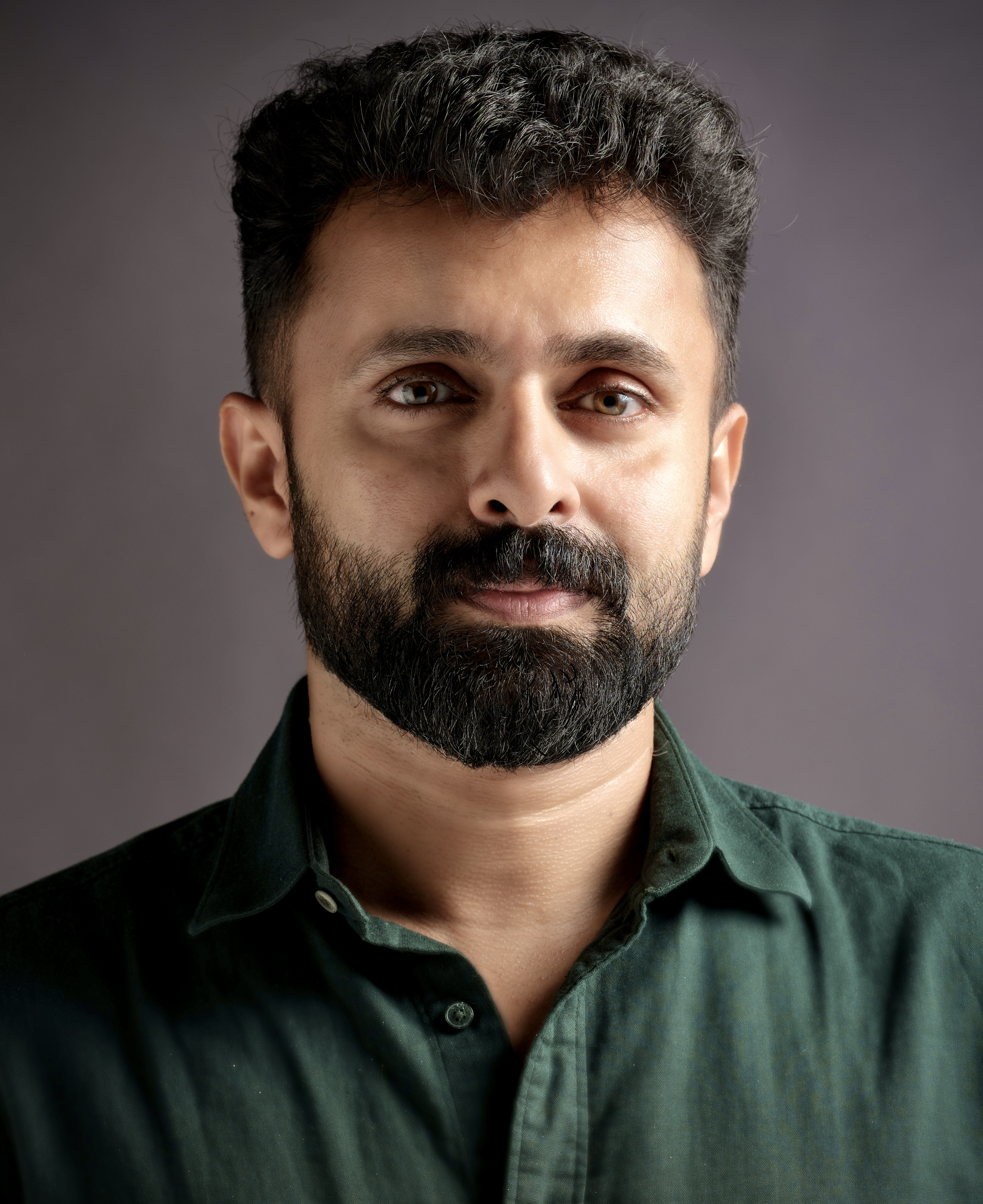
- Born: 11 November 1977 (age 48); Pazhayangadi, Kannur, Kerala, India
- Education: University of Calicut
- Occupations: Actor; director
- Years active: 1988–present
- Spouse: Sandhya (m. 2010)
- Children: 2
- Awards: Kerala State Film Awards

Vineeth Kumar (born on 11 November 1977) is an Indian actor, director and screenwriter known for his work in the Malayalam film industry. He has had a career spanning decades, transitioning from a child artist to an accomplished director.

He made his acting debut in 1988 as a child artist in the movie Padippura. The same year, he earned critical acclaim and the Kerala State Film Award for his performance in the epic historical drama Oru Vadakkan Veeragatha. Directed by Hariharan and written by M.T. Vasudevan Nair, this film featured him as the younger version of Mammootty's iconic character Chandu Chekavar.

He made his directorial debut with Ayal Njanalla (2015), a romantic comedy entertainer, starring Fahad Faasil.

== Personal life ==
Vineeth was born on 11 November 1977 to Karunan and Yamuna in Pazhayangadi, Kannur. He had his primary education from Koodali Higher Secondary School. After pre-degree from Government Brennen College, Thalassery, he pursued a BSc degree in Mathematics.

He started learning Bharatanatyam at the age of six and quickly became known for his talent. As a student, he won several dance prizes, including the top "Kalaprathibha" title at the Kerala School Kalolsavam in 1988.

He married Sandhya on 19 August 2010. They have two daughters, Maitreyi and Mathangi.

== Film career ==
=== As a child actor ===
During his early years, Kumar played significant roles in several notable films, including Oru Vadakkan Veeragatha (1989), Bharatham (1991), Sargam (1992), Midhunam (1992), and Adwaitham (1993). These performances established him as a versatile child actor in Malayalam cinema.

After he transitioned into adult roles, Kumar gained recognition for his performances in films such as Devadoothan (2000), Kanmashi (2002), Sethurama Iyer CBI (2004), Aparichithan (2004), The Tiger (2005), Vegam (2014), and Simon Daniel (2022)

=== As director ===
Vineeth Kumar ventured into direction with his debut film Ayal Njanalla (2015), starring Fahadh Faasil. He also wrote the screenplay for this film which explored themes of self-discovery and relationships.

His second directorial venture, Dear Friend (2022), starring Tovino Thomas in the lead, premiered in theaters on 10 June 2022. The film received widespread acclaim and was subsequently released on the Netflix OTT platform in July 2022, where it continued to garner positive reviews. The movie delved into the lives of a group of friends searching for their missing companion, who is later revealed to be a con artist. The film received praise for its engaging narrative and character development.

His latest movie was Pavi Caretaker (2024) starring Dileep.

== Filmography ==
Film credits as an actor
Year	Title	Role	Notes
1989	Oru Vadakkan Veeragatha	Young Chandu	Child actor
1989	Mudra		Child actor
1989	Padippura		Child actor
1989	Anagha		Child actor
1989	Dasharatham	Joseph	Child actor
1991	Bharatham	Appu	Child actor
1991	Inspector Balram	Jithu	Child actor
1992	Sargam		Child actor
1992	Adhwaytham		Child actor
1993	Mithunam	Young Sethu	Child actor
1994	Vishnu		Child actor
1996	Azhakiya Ravanan	Santhosh	
1997	Krishnagudiyil Oru Pranayakalathu	Balan	
2000	Devadoothan	Nikhil Maheshwar	
2000	Thottam		
2001	Sharja to Sharja	Kannan	
2002	Pranayamanithooval	Balagopal	
2002	Kanmashi	Vishnu	
2003	Melvilasom Seriyanu	Nandu	
2003	Mazhanoolkkanavu		
2004	Aparichithan	Chacko	
2004	Sethurama Iyer CBI	Ganesh	
2004	Kottaaram Vaidyan		
2005	The Tiger	Kishore	
2006	Pulijanmam		
2006	Baba Kalyani	Santhosh	
2007	Flash	Arunkumar	
2008	Thirakkatha		
2010	Sufi Paranja Katha	Writer	
2011	Sevenes	Aravindan	
2011	Ithu Nammude Katha	Mahesh	
2012	Chapters	Arun	
2012	Face2Face	Anwar	
2013	Oru Yathrayil		
2014	Vegam	Sidharth	
2015	Oru Vadakkan Selfie	himself	Cameo
2016	Sahapadi 1975		
2017	Careful	Bijoy	
2018	Oru Kuttanadan Blog		Cameo
2019	Krishnam		
2022	Simon Daniel	Simon Daniel	
2023	Higuita	Goon	
2024	Pavi Caretaker	Abhishek Krishna	Also Director
2024	Rifle Club	Shahjahan	
2026	Sambhavam Adhyayam Onnu		

Short Films
Year	Title
2012	The Spark
2020	Oru Nurungu Samsayam (The Little Riddle)

Film credits as director
Year	Title	Notes	Ref.
2015	Ayal Njanalla		
2022	Dear Friend		
2024	Pavi Caretaker		

Television credits as judge
Year	Title	Channel	Ref.
2026-present	Dance Dhamaka	Flowers TV	
