= Ulsaha Committee =

- Directed by: Akku Akbar
- Written by: Shyju Anthikad
- Produced by: Arun Ghosh; Binoy Chandran
- Starring: Jayaram; Baburaj; Kalabhavan Shajon
- Cinematography: Anil Nair
- Edited by: Lijo Paul
- Music by: Bijibal
- Production company: Chand.V.Creations
- Release date: 2 May 2014
- Country: India
- Language: Malayalam

Ulsaha Committee is a 2014 Malayalam Science Fiction comedy film directed by Akku Akbar and starring Jayaram, Baburaj and Kalabhavan Shajon.

== Plot ==
The film is about a school drop out and his friends whose pursuits for amazing scientific inventions lands him in trouble.

== Cast ==
- Jayaram as Apoorvan (Appu)
- Baburaj as Gunda Chopra
- Kalabhavan Shajon as Babumon
- Sheela as Rosie
- Isha Talwar as Rosemary
- Vinutha Lal as Haritha S. Nair
- Suraj Venjaramoodu as Natholi Goplan
- Vinaya Prasad as Jancy, Rosemary's mother
- Lakshmi Priya as Chandrika
- Sunil Sukhada as Babumon's father-law
- Kochu Preman as Peethambaran Kurup, Manadarakadavu Panchayath President
- Joy Mathew as Thathamangalam Narayana Ayyengar
- Sasi Kalinga as Kadavil Aashan
- Hareesh Perumanna as Jallian Kanaran
- Arun Gosh as Roy
- Nelson
- Neethu Thomas as Suma, Babumon's wife
- Thomas Unniyadan as Doctor
- Mukesh as the narrator (voice only)
- Prem Nazir as Rosie's love interest (Archieved footage)

== Reception ==
The film received negative reviews from critics. Sify.com wrote: "Disturbingly loud and totally pointless, all this film manages is to make you cringe." The Times of India rated the film 1.5 in a scale of 5 and said, "the film turns out to be a nagging watch with its never-ending stream of loud, boisterous, tasteless humour. Rating the film 1.5/5, Veeyen of Nowrunning.com said, "Ulsaha Committee' is a visual onslaught on the audience from the Jayaram - Akku Akbar team that takes it by total shock. Faced with the unenviable choice of burying his head in his palms or throwing it back for a quick snooze, the viewer lets out one yawn after the other until the prospect of a lock jaw petrifies him.
