= Kalabhavan Shajohn =

Indian actor

- Born: Shaji John; Kottayam, Kerala, India
- Occupations: Actor; mimicry artist; director; playback singer
- Years active: 1998–present
- Spouse: Dini
- Children: 2

Shaji John, professionally credited by his stage name Kalabhavan Shajohn is an Indian actor, director and comedian who works primarily in Malayalam cinema. He started his career as a mimicry artist in Kalabhavan, Kochi. Making his debut in 1999 as a body double in My Dear Karadi and having made more than 100 appearances, he received a major breakthrough in his career with Drishyam (2013), in which he played a negative role. He made his directorial debut with Brother's Day starring Prithviraj Sukumaran. As of 2025, he has starred in more than 150 Malayalam films.

== Personal life ==
He was born as Shaji John to E. J. John, a retired ASI and Rejina, a retired nurse, in Varissery, Kottayam, Kerala in India. He studied at St. Mary's College, Manarcaud. He has a brother Shibu John who is also a mimicry artist and RJ in Voice of Kerala.

He married Dini on 28 October 2004. The couple has a daughter, Hanna and a son, Yohan.

== Awards and honours ==
Year	Award	Award Category	Recipient	Notes
2013	Kerala State Film Awards	Special Mention	Drishyam	
2013	South Indian International Movie Awards (SIIMA)	Best Actor in a Negative Role	Drishyam	
2013	Vanitha Film Awards	Best Actor in a Negative Role	Drishyam	
2013	Asianet Film Awards	Best Actor in a Negative Role	Drishyam	
2023	Kerala Film Critics Association Awards	Best Supporting Actor	Ithuvare, Aattam	

== Filmography ==
=== As actor ===
==== Films ====
Year	Title	Role	Notes
1999	My Dear Karadi	Rangan / Body Double for Kalabhavan Mani in Bear Costume	
2000	Kinnara Thumbikal		
2000	Kathara		
2001	Aparanmar Nagarathil	Psychiatrist	
2001	Ee Parakkum Thalika	Traffic Police Officer	
2002	Chirikudukka	Dr. Shankar	
2002	Kashillatheyum Jeevikkam	Police Officer	
2002	www.Anukutumbam.com		
2002	Bamboo Boys	SI Jagan	
2002	Kayamkulam Kanaaran		
2002	Nammal		
2002	Akhila	Lineman	
2003	Thilakkam	Pappan	
2003	CID Moosa	Police Constable	
2003	Sadanandante Samayam		
2003	Chakram		
2004	Thalamelam	Sharavanan	
2004	Runway	Paramasivam's friend	
2004	Rasikan		
2004	Greetings	Traffic Policeman	
2005	Kochi Rajavu	Car driver	
2005	Rajamanikyam		
2005	Pandippada	Raghavan	
2005	Chanthupottu		
2006	Achanuragatha Veedu		
2006	Thuruppu Gulan	Truck Driver	
2006	Kisan	Kuyilan	
2006	Pachakuthira		
2007	Inspector Garud	Police Constable Chacko	
2007	Khaki	Suraj	
2008	Annan Thambi	A drunkard	
2008	Magic Lamp		
2008	Pachamarathanalil	Murukan	
2008	Crazy Gopalan	Police Officer	
2008	Cycle		
2009	Hailesa	Kuttayi	
2009	Vellathooval		
2009	Ee Pattanathil Bhootham	Police Constable Sahadevan	
2009	Duplicate	Maikkattu Moose	
2009	Swantham Lekhakan		
2009	Shambhu	Kumaran	
2010	In Ghost House Inn	Van Driver	
2010	Kanmazha Peyyum Munpe	Khadar	
2010	Alexander the Great		
2010	Paappi Appacha	Shashankan's sidekick	
2010	Karyasthan	Aadu Ramu	
2010	Shikkar		
2010	Elsamma Enna Aankutty		
2010	Marykkundoru Kunjaadu	Solomon's Friend	
2011	Kudumbasree Travels	Suman	
2011	Priyappetta Nattukare	Mani	
2011	Venicile Vyapari	Isthiri Lonappan	
2011	Christian Brothers		
2011	Swapna Sanchari		
2011	Lucky Jokers		
2011	Janapriyan		
2011	Killadi Raman		
2011	Dr. Love		
2011	Ulakam Chuttum Valiban	Police constable	
2011	Maharaja Talkies		
2011	Aazhakadal	Bosco	
2012	Kunjaliyan		
2012	Unnam		
2012	Masters	Driver Santhosh	
2012	Ee Thirakkinidayil	Sadananthan Pattikadu	
2012	Mayamohini	Sisubalan	
2012	Josettante Hero	Chandran	
2012	Mullamottum Munthiricharum		
2012	Pulival Pattanam		
2012	Namukku Parkkan	Mohanan	
2012	Thappana	Kochappi	
2012	Ustad Hotel	Driver	
2012	Scene Onnu Nammude Veedu		
2012	MLA Mani: Patham Classum Gusthiyum	Neelakandan	
2012	Bhoopadathil Illatha Oridam		
2012	Manthrikan	Shekharan kutty	
2012	Mullassery Madhavan Kutty Nemom P. O.		
2012	My Boss	Ali (errand boy)	
2012	Chapters	Bus conductor	
2013	Isaac Newton S/O Philipose	ASI Singampuli Raju	
2013	Rebecca Uthup Kizhakkemala		
2013	72 Model	Sub-Inspector S.R. Pavanan	
2013	Kathaveedu	Johny	
2013	Ladies and Gentleman	Mani	
2013	Proprietors: Kammath & Kammath	Kallan Pathrose	
2013	Sound Thoma	Sabu	
2013	Sringaravelan	Vasu (Kannan's friend)	
2013	Drishyam	Constable Sahadevan	
2014	Mannar Mathai Speaking 2	Babumon	
2014	Black Forest		
2014	Praise the Lord	Fr. Antony	
2014	Ring Master	Veterinary Doctor Muthu	
2014	Ulsaha Committee	Babumon (Baliyaadu)	
2014	Garbhasreeman	Gopalakrishnan	
2014	Vaikeetentha Paripadi	Sadanandan	Short Film
2014	Njangalude Veettile Athidhikal	Rajan	
2014	Mylanchi Monchulla Veedu	Ismail	
2014	Cousins	Veerappa Naidu Gounder	
2015	Bhaskar The Rascal	Abdu Razack	
2015	Rudrasimhasanam	Abdullah	
2015	Compartment		
2015	High Alert		
2015	Urumbukal Urangarilla	Carlose	
2015	Amar Akbar Anthony	Jadayu Sabu Ambulance Driver	
2015	Vishwasam Athalle Ellam	Franklin	
2015	Rajamma @ Yahoo	R Pavithran Nair	
2016	Pavada	Eldo	
2016	Oppam	Madhu	
2016	Kattappanayile Rithwik Roshan	Director James Antony	
2017	Munthirivallikal Thalirkkumbol	Monayi	
2017	Oru Mexican Aparatha	Shiyaz	
2017	The Great Father	Sathyan	
2017	Adventures of Omanakuttan	Vinayak Hegde	
2017	Ramaleela	Thomas Chacko/TC	
2017	Pareeth Pandari		
2017	Sherlock Toms	Sugunan Master	
2018	Kallai FM	Abdullah Koya	
2018	Sakhavinte Priyasakhi		
2018	Orayiram Kinakkalal	Shajahan P. K.	
2018	Abrahaminte Santhathikal	CI Sukumaran	
2018	Kaithola Chathan		
2018	Nonsense	PT Sir	
2018	Oru Pazhaya Bomb Kadha	SI Rajendran	
2018	Ottakoru Kaamukan	Firoz Khan	
2018	2.0	Telecommunication Minister Vairamoorthy	Tamil film; debut
2018	Johny Johny Yes Appa	Chavaramplakal Jose	
2018	Thattumpurath Achuthan	SI Justin John	
2019	Irupathiyonnaam Noottaandu	Abusi	
2019	Lucifer	Aloshy Joseph	
2019	Madhura Raja	Peruchazhi Perumal	
2019	Unda	Sam J. Mathen	
2019	Brother's Day	Police officer	Directorial debut
2019	Ulta	Bhairavan Ayyappan	
2020	Shylock	Prathap Varma	
2021	Keshu Ee Veedinte Nadhan	Rajendran (Keshu's Brother in Law	
2022	Meppadiyan	Registrar Office Worker	
2022	Night Drive	DYSP Cherian Chacko	
2022	Kaduva	SI Dominic Benjamin	
2022	Jo and Jo	Saji, Indhu's father	
2022	Ini Utharam	CI Karunan	
2022	5il Oral Thaskaran	Shahjahan	
2023	Theru		
2023	Santhosham	Suresh Kumar	
2023	Kaipola	Kochu	
2023	Nadhikalil Sundari Yamuna	RC	
2023	Bandra	Mirchi	
2023	Pulli	Simon	
2024	Aattam	Hari	
2024	Ithuvare		
2024	CID Ramachandran Retd. SI	Ramachandran	
2024	Kudumbasthreeyum Kunjadum		
2024	Partners	Parthasarathi	
2024	Petta Rap	Kasimedu Michael	
2024	Oru Anweshanathinte Thudakkam		
2025	ID:The Fake		
2025	Bromance	Courier Babu	
2025	Chattuli	Shivadasan	
2025	Ouseppinte Osyath	George	
2025	L2 Empuraan	Aloshy Joseph	
2025	Karam	Kamal Muhammed	
2026	Drishyam 3	Sahadevan	
2026	Ottam Thullal †	TBA	

==== Web series ====
Year	Title	Role	Language	Notes
2024	Nagendran's Honeymoons	Inspector Varkey Avarachan	Malayalam	Disney+ Hotstar

=== Playback singing ===
Year	Song	Title	Music	Lyrics	Notes
2014	"Maaye Maaye Neeyen"	Njangalude Veettile Athidhikal	Ratheesh Vegha	Santhosh Varma	
2015	"Premamennal"	Amar Akbar Anthony	Nadirsha	Nadirsha	Party song

=== As director ===
Year	Title	Writer	Notes
2019	Brother's Day	Himself	Directorial debut
