= Akku Akbar =

Indian film director of Malayalam films

- Occupation: Director
- Years active: 2002–present

Akku Akbar (also referred to as Akbar Jose) is an Indian film director of Malayalam films. He shot to fame with the 2009 blockbuster film Veruthe Oru Bharya, which had a family theme. He later remade his Bollywood film Gauri: The Unborn in Malayalam as Kana Kanmani (2009).

== Career ==
Earlier, Akbar had directed three Malayalam films along with Jose, including Sadanandante Samayam (2003) which starred Dileep and Kavya Madhavan. He then directed a Hindi film, produced by Goodnight Mohan, that dealt with abortion with a cast comprising Rituparna Sengupta, Atul Kulkarni and Anupam Kher. It was written by K. Gireesh Kumar.

He directed Kana Kanmani (2009), a remake of his Bollywood film, Gouri. He teamed up with Jayaram and the writer K Gireesh Kumar.

He directed Vellaripravinte Changathi (2011) starring Dileep and Kavya Madhavan, produced under the banner of Chandvi Creations by Bijoy Chandran. According to him, "The film talks about a cinema within cinema in true sense."

== Filmography ==
- Mazhathullikkilukkam (2002)
- Sadanandante Samayam (2003)
- Gauri: The Unborn (2007)
- Aandavan (2008)
- Veruthe Oru Bharya (2008)
- Kana Kanmani (2009)
- Vellaripravinte Changathi (2011)
- Bharya Athra Pora (2013)
- Ulsaha Committee (2014)
- Mathai Kuzhappakkaranalla (2014)

== Awards and nominations ==
- Asianet Film Awards
  - 2008: Best Director: Veruthe Oru Bharya
