= List of Malayalam films of 2019 =

The tables list the Malayalam films released in theaters in the year 2019. Premiere shows and film festival screenings are not considered as releases for this list.

== Released films ==
Opening		Title	Director	Cast	Production house	Ref
J A N U A R Y	4	1948 Kaalam Paranjathu	Rajeev Naduvanad	Bala, Prakash Chengal, Devan		
J A N U A R Y	10	Janaadhipan	Thanseer M.A	Hareesh Peradi, Vinu Mohan, Sunil Sukhada, Kottayam Pradeep		
J A N U A R Y	11	Bolivia	Faizal Koonath	Abhay Stephen, Soumya Sadanandan, Ashok Kumar, Neena Kurup, Master Aslaabith		
J A N U A R Y	11	Madhaveeyam	Thejas Perumanna	Vineeth, Geetha Vijayan, Mammukoya, Babu Namboothiri		
J A N U A R Y	11	Oru Caribbean Udayippu	A. Joji	Samuel Abiola Robinson, Mareena Michael Kurisingal, Aneesh G. Menon, Nandan Unni		
J A N U A R Y	11	Vijay Superum Pournamiyum	Jis Joy	Asif Ali, Aishwarya Lekshmi, Aju Varghese, Balu Varghese, KPAC Lalitha, Renji Panicker		
J A N U A R Y	18	Mikhael	Haneef Adeni	Nivin Pauly, Unni Mukundan, Manjima Mohan, J. D. Chakravarthy		
J A N U A R Y	18	Neeyum Njanum	A. K. Sajan	Siju Wilson, Sharafudheen, Anu Sithara, Vishnu Unnikrishnan, Dileesh Pothan, Surabhi Lakshmi		
J A N U A R Y	18	Praana	V. K. Prakash	Nithya Menen, Kunchacko Boban, Nani		
J A N U A R Y	25	Irupathiyonnaam Noottaandu	Arun Gopy	Pranav Mohanlal, Rachel David, Manoj K. Jayan, Gokul Suresh		
J A N U A R Y	25	Panthu	Aadhi	Nedumudi Venu, Aju Varghese, Irshad		
J A N U A R Y	25	Sakalakalashala	Vinod Guruvayur	Niranj Maniyanpillai, Manasa Radhakrishnan, Tini Tom, Dharmajan Bolgatty, Hareesh Kanaran, Renji Panicker		
J A N U A R Y	25	Oru Kaattil Oru Paaykappal	G P Vijayakumar	Shine Tom Chacko, Mythili		
J A N U A R Y	25	Nalla Vishesham	Ajithan	Biju Sopanam, Sreeji Gopinathan, Aneesha Seena		
J A N U A R Y	25	Vallikettu	Jibin	Ashkar Soudan, Jaffer Idukki, Mamukkoya		
F E B R U A R Y	1	Allu Ramendran	Bilahari K. Raj	Kunchacko Boban, Chandini Sreedharan, Aparna Balamurali, Sreenath Bhasi, Krishna Shankar		
F E B R U A R Y	1	Lonappante Mamodeesa	Leo Thaddeus	Jayaram, Anna Rajan, Hareesh Kanaran, Kaniha, Nisha Sarangh, Joju George		
F E B R U A R Y	1	Ningal Camera Nireekshanathilaanu	C. S. Vinayan	Bhagath Manuel, Shaitya Santhosh, Renji Panicker, Sasi Kalinga, Ambika Mohan		
F E B R U A R Y	1	Theerumaanam	P. K. Radhakrishnan	Santhosh Keezhattoor, Neena Kurup, Shobhi Thilakan		
F E B R U A R Y	7	9	Jenuse Mohamed	Prithviraj Sukumaran, Wamiqa Gabbi, Mamta Mohandas, Prakash Raj		
F E B R U A R Y	7	Kumbalangi Nights	Madhu C. Narayanan	Fahadh Faasil, Shane Nigam, Soubin Shahir, Sreenath Bhasi		
F E B R U A R Y	14	Oru Adaar Love	Omar Lulu	Roshan Abdul Rahoof, Priya Prakash Varrier, Noorin Shereef, Aneesh G. Menon, Ashish Vidyarthi		
F E B R U A R Y	15	June	Ahammed Khabeer	Rajisha Vijayan, Sarjano Khalid, Joju George, Arjun Ashokan, Aju Varghese		
F E B R U A R Y	15	Kantharam	Shan Kechery	Hemanth Menon, Jiivika Pillappa, Shivaji Guruvayoor, Biju Kuttan		
F E B R U A R Y	15	Ilakal Pacha Pookkal Manja	Vijayakrishnan	Nandu, Neena Kurup, Krishna Prabha,Master Saharsh, Master Pranav		
F E B R U A R Y	21	Kodathi Samaksham Balan Vakeel	B. Unnikrishnan	Dileep, Mamta Mohandas, Priya Anand, Suraj Venjaramoodu, Lena		
F E B R U A R Y	22	Mr. & Ms. Rowdy	Jeethu Joseph	Kalidas Jayaram, Aparna Balamurali, Vijay Babu, Shebin Benson		
F E B R U A R Y	22	Red Signal	Sathyadas Kanjiramkulam	Indrans, Charmila		
F E B R U A R Y	22	Swarna Malsyangal	G. S. Pradeep	Vijay Babu, Siddique, Rasna Pavithran, Anjali Nair, Hareesh Kanaran, Sudheer Karamana		
F E B R U A R Y	22	Vaarikkuzhiyile Kolapathakam	Rejishh Midhila	Dileesh Pothan, Anjana Appukuttan, Amith Chakalakkal, Dheeraj Denny, Lena		
M A R C H	1	An International Local Story	Harisree Ashokan	Rahul Madhav, Aswin Jose, Deepak Parambol, Mamitha Baiju, Manoj K. Jayan, Surabhi Santosh, Harisree Ashokan		
M A R C H	1	Daivam Sakshi	Snehajith	Suraj Venjaramoodu, Sunil Sukhada, Biju Kuttan, Ambika Mohan		
M A R C H	1	Prashna Parihara Shala	Shabeer Yena	Akhil Prabhakar, Biju Kuttan, Jayan Cherthala, Jowin Abraham, Kiran Raj, Sarath Babu		
M A R C H	1	Thenkashikattu	Shinod Sahadevan	Hemanth Menon, Kavya Suresh, Jeevika, Padmaraj Ratheesh, Biyon, Sunil Sukhada		
M A R C H	8	Kalikoottukkar	P. K. Baburaaj	Devadas, Nidhi Arun, Jenson Jose, Renji Panicker, Shammi Thilakan, Siddique, Sunil Sukhada		
M A R C H	8	Ormma	Suresh Thiruvalla	Sooraj Kumar, Gayatri Arun, Audrey Miriam Henest, Dinesh Panicker		
M A R C H	8	Ottam	Zam	Roshan Ullas, Althaf, Renu Soundar, Nandu Anand, Madhuri Dilip, Thesni Khan		
M A R C H	8	Padmavyuhathile Abhimanyu	Vineesh Aradya	Anoop Chandran, Indrans, Sona Nair		
M A R C H	8	Pengalila	T. V. Chandran	Narain, Lal, Iniya, Renji Panicker, Akshara Kishore		
M A R C H	8	Soothrakkaran	Anil Raj	Gokul Suresh, Varsha Bollamma, Jacob Gregory, Lalu Alex, Shammi Thilakan		
M A R C H	8	The Gambinos	Girish Panicker	Vishnu Vinay, Radhika Sarathkumar, Sampath Raj, Sreejith Ravi, Sijoy Varghese		
M A R C H	15	Kosrakollikal	Jayan C. Krishna	Bhagath Manuel		
M A R C H	15	Arayakadavil	Gopi Kuttikol	Shivaji Guruvayoor, Kalasala Babu, Zeenath, Sasi Kalinga		
M A R C H	15	Mere Pyare Deshvasiyom	Sandeep Ajith Kumar	Nirmal Palazhi, Neena Kurup, K. T. C. Abdullah, Ashkar Saudan		
M A R C H	15	Therottam	Pradeesh Unnikrishnan	Azhar Mohammed, Antony Francis, Rony Joseph, Jayalakshmi, Rupesh Raj, Aishwarya Prashanth		
M A R C H	15	Mullapoo Viplavam	Nicleson Poulose	Kalyani Nair, Jayakrishnan		
M A R C H	15	Muttayikkallanum Mammaliyum	Ambujakshan Nambiar	Rajeev Pillai, Dharmajan Bolgatty, Kailash Varghese		
M A R C H	15	Old is Gold	Prakash Kunjhan Moorayil	Nirmal Palazhy, Saju Navodaya, Dharmajan Bolgatty, Haritha, Maya Menon		
M A R C H	15	British Bungalow	Subair Hameed	Santhosh Keezhattoor, Anoop Chandran, Kochu Preman, Aparna Nair		
M A R C H	22	Argentina Fans Kaattoorkadavu	Midhun Manuel Thomas	Kalidas Jayaram, Aishwarya Lakshmi		
M A R C H	22	Ali	Sikkandhar Dulkarnain	Abid Wayanad, Shamsudeeen Pappinissery, Nishad Shah		
M A R C H	22	Ilayaraja	Madhav Ramadasan	Guinness Pakru, Gokul Suresh, Harisree Ashokan, Deepak Parambol		
M A R C H	22	Priyapettavar	Khader Moidu	Rajasenan, M. R. Gopakumar		
M A R C H	28	Lucifer	Prithviraj Sukumaran	Mohanlal, Prithviraj Sukumaran, Indrajith Sukumaran, Tovino Thomas, Manju Warrier, Vivek Oberoi, Nyla Usha, Saniya Iyappan, Kalabhavan Shajon		
A P R I L	5	Mera Naam Shaji	Nadirshah	Asif Ali, Nikhila Vimal, Biju Menon, Baiju, Dharmajan Bolgatty		
A P R I L	5	The Sound Story	Prasad Prabhakar	Resul Pookutty, Joy Mathew		
A P R I L	12	Athiran	Vivek	Fahadh Faasil, Sai Pallavi, Prakash Raj, Renji Panicker, Shanthi Krishna		
A P R I L	12	Madhura Raja	Vysakh	Mammooty, Jai, Jagapati Babu, Siddique, Anusree, Shamna Kasim, Mahima Nambiar, Anna Rajan, Nedumudi Venu, Vijayaraghavan		
A P R I L	25	Oru Yamandan Premakadha	B. C. Noufal	Dulquer Salmaan, Nikhila Vimal, Samyuktha Menon, Vishnu Unnikrishnan, Soubin Shahir, Salim Kumar		
A P R I L	26	Uyare	Manu Ashokan	Parvathy, Asif Ali, Tovino Thomas, Siddique, Samyuktha Menon, Anarkali Marikkar		
M A Y	3	Prakashante Metro	Haseena Suneer	Dinesh Prabhakar, Saju Navodaya, Irshad Ali, Jayan Cherthala, Noby Marcose		
M A Y	10	Kalippu	Jessen Joseph	Bindu Aneesh, Jeffin Joseph, Sajan Palluruthy, Bala Singh, Shobi Thilakan, Ambika Mohan		
M A Y	10	The Great Indian Road Movie	Sohanlal	Master Ashray, Vijay Anand, Anila, Madhupal, Sunil Sukhada, Prem Manoj		
M A Y	10	Swapnarajyam	Ranji Vijayan	Jagadish, Parvathi T., Mamukkoya, Ranji Vijayan		
M A Y	17	Ishq	Anuraj Manohar	Shane Nigam, Ann Sheetal, Shine Tom Chacko, Leona Lishoy		
M A Y	17	Kuttymama	V. M. Vinu	Sreenivasan, Dhyan Sreenivasan, Durga Krishna, Meera Vasudevan, Prem Kumar		
M A Y	17	Oru Nakshatramulla Aakasam	Ajith Pulleri	Aparna Gopinath, Lal Jose, Santhosh Keezhattoor, Jaffer Idukki, Sethulakshmi, Eric Zachariya		
M A Y	17	Sidharthan Enna Njan	Asha Prabha	Sibi Thomas, Dileesh Pothan, T.S.Arun Giladi, Indrans, Athuliya premod, Kalabhavan Haneef		
M A Y	24	Adutha Chodyam	AKS Nambiar	Sheikh Rasheed, Malavika Narayanan		
M A Y	24	Jeem Boom Bhaa	Rahul Ramachandran	Askar Ali, Baiju Santhosh, Anju Kurien		
M A Y	24	Oronnonnara Pranayakadha	Shibu Balan	Shebin Benson, Rachael David, Surabhi Lakshmi		
M A Y	24	Onnam Sakshi	Vinod Manasseri	Abhilash Nair, Lishoy, Sunil Karanthur, Kulappulli Leela		
M A Y	24	Rakshapurushan	Nalini Prabha Menon	Deepak Menon, Manju Sankar		
M A Y	24	The Gambler	Tom Emmatty	Anson Paul, Dayana, Innocent, Salim Kumar		
M A Y	31	Hridyam	K. C. Binu	Kottayam Nazeer, Kochu Preman, Kalabhavan Navas		
M A Y	31	Mangalathu Vasundhara	K. S. Sivakumar	Shanthi Krishna, Krishna Ganesh, Lakshmi Priya		
M A Y	31	Vishudha Pusthakam	Shabu Usman	Badushah, Aaliyah, Manoj K. Jayan, Janardhanan, Mamukoya		
J U N E	5	Children's Park	Shafi	Gayathri Suresh, Manasa Radhakrishnan, Sharafudheen, Vishnu Unnikrishnan, Dhruvan		
J U N E	5	Thamaasha	Ashraf Hamza	Vinay Forrt, Divya Prabha, Grace Antony, Chinnu Chandhini		
J U N E	5	Thottappan	Shanavas K. Bavakutty	Vinayakan, Roshan Mathew, Dileesh Pothan, Manoj K Jayan		
J U N E	7	Mask	Sunil Hanif	Shine Tom Chacko, Chemban Vinod, Priyanka Nair		
J U N E	7	My Great Grandfather	Aneesh Anwar	Jayaram, Divya Pillai, Surabhi Santosh, Baburaj, Unni Mukundan		
J U N E	7	Virus	Aashiq Abu	Kunchacko Boban, Parvathy, Asif Ali, RIma Kallingal, Tovino Thomas, Indrajith Sukumaran, Revathy, Rahman, Sreenath Bhasi, Soubin Shahir, Madonna Sebastian, Poornima Indrajith, Joju George		
J U N E	14	Ikkayude Shakadam	Prince Avaraachan	Sarath Appani, Nandan Unni, DJ Thommi		
J U N E	14	Unda	Khalid Rahman	Mammootty, Shine Tom Chacko, Jacob Gregory, Arjun Ashokan, Asif Ali		
J U N E	21	And the Oscar Goes To...	Salim Ahamed	Tovino Thomas, Sreenivasan, Anu Sithara, Siddique, Salim Kumar, Sarath Appani, Lal, Hareesh Kanaran		
J U N E	21	Naan Petta Makan	Saji S. Palamel	Minon John, Sarayu, Joy Mathew, Sidhartha Siva		
J U N E	21	Vakathirivu	K. K. Muhammad Ali	Kailash, Revathy Menon, Meenakshi Madhuraghavan, Mohammed Althaf, Lalu Alex, Shanthi Krishna		
J U N E	28	Gramavasis	B. N. Shajeer Sha	Indrans, Santhosh Keezhattoor, VishnuPrasad, Azees Nedumangad		
J U N E	28	Kakshi: Amminippilla	Dinjith Ayyathan	Asif Ali, Ahmed Sidhique, Basil Joseph, Ashwathy Manoharan, Fara Shibla, Vijayaraghavan		
J U N E	28	Luca	Arun Bose	Tovino Thomas, Vinitha Koshy, Ahaana Krishna, Sooraj S. Kurup, Thalaivasal Vijay		
J U N E	28	Queen of Neermathalam Pootha Kalam	A. R. Amal Kannan	Khalfan, Dona Maria Anthraper, Sidharth Menon, Anil Nedumangad, Preethi Gino, Arun Chandran		
J U L Y	4	Evidey	K. K. Rajeev	Shebin Benson, Asha Sarath, Anaswara Rajan, Manoj K. Jayan, Suraj Venjaramoodu		
J U L Y	5	Pathinettam Padi	Shankar Ramakrishnan	Mammootty, Prithviraj Sukumaran, Unni Mukundan, Ahaana Krishna, Priyamani, Manoj K. Jayan, Aarsha Chandini Baiju		
J U L Y	6	Subharathri	Vyasan K. P.	Dileep, Anu Sithara, Siddique, Suraj Venjaramoodu, Nedumudi Venu, Indrans		
J U L Y	11	Maarconi Mathaai	Sanil Kalathil	Jayaram, Vijay Sethupathi, Athmiya Rajan, Tini Tom, Joy Mathew		
J U L Y	12	Sathyam Paranja Viswasikkuvo	G. Prajith	Biju Menon, Samvrutha Sunil, Sudhi Koppa, Saiju Kurup, Bhagath Manuel		
J U L Y	19	A for Apple	B. Madhusoodhanan Nair	Salim Kumar, Nedumudi Venu, Sheela, Kalyani Nair, Saranya Anand, Devan, Santhosh Keezhattoor		
J U L Y	19	Janamaithri	John Manthrikan	Saiju Kurup, Indrans, Vijay Babu, Manikandan Pattambi		
J U L Y	19	Kunjiramante Kuppayam	Siddique Chennamangaloor	Thalaivasal Vijay, Sajitha Madathil, Major Ravi		
J U L Y	19	Sachin	Santhosh Nair	Dhyan Sreenivasan, Anna Rajan, Aju Varghese, Ramesh Pisharody, Renji Panicker		
J U L Y	19	Shibu	Arjun Prabhakaran and Gokul Ramakrishnan	Karthik Ramakrishnan, Anju Kurian, Salim Kumar, Biju Kuttan, Lukman Lukku, Aiswarya		
J U L Y	19	Chilappol Penkutty	Prasad Noorand	Krishnachandran, Sunil Sukhada, Aristo Suresh		
J U L Y	26	Chila New Gen Nattuvisheshangal	East Coast Vijayan	Akhil Prabhakaran, Suraj Venjaramoodu, Biju Kuttan, Noby Marcose		
J U L Y	26	Maffi Dona	Pauly Vadakkan	Maqbool Salmaan, Sreevidya Nair, Jubil Rajan P Dev		
J U L Y	26	Oru Desha Vishesham	Sathyanarayanan Unni	Kalapathi Balakrishnan, Porur Unnikrishnan, Swasthika Dutta		
J U L Y	26	Thankabhasma Kuriyitta Thamburaatti	Sujan Aromal	Bhagath Manuel, Devika Nambiar, Baiju, Sajimon Parayil, Kalabhavan Navas, Jaffer Idukki		
J U L Y	26	Thanneer Mathan Dinangal	Girish A.D	Mathew Thomas, Anaswara Rajan, Vineeth Sreenivasan, Naslen K. Gafoor		
A U G U S T	2	Ormayil Oru Shishiram	Vivek Aryan	Deepak Parambol, Anaswara Ponnambath, Basil Joseph, Sijoy Varghese		
A U G U S T	2	Mammali Enna Indiakkaran	Arun Shivan	Santhosh Keezhattoor, Prakash Bare, Rajesh Sharma		
A U G U S T	2	Moonam Pralayam	Ratheesh Raju MR	Sai Kumar, Bindhu Panikkar, Ashkar Soudhan		
A U G U S T	2	Margamkali	Sreejith Vijayan	Bibin George, Namitha Pramod, Gouri Kishan, Siddique, Hareesh Kanaran		
A U G U S T	2	Fancy Dress	Ranjith Skaria	Guinness Pakru, Shweta Menon, Hareesh Kanaran, Kalabhavan Shajon, Bala		
A U G U S T	2	Shakthan Market	Jeeva	Sreejith Ravi, Akhil Prabhakar, Sudheer Karamana		
A U G U S T	2	Viplavam Jayikkanullathaanu	Nishad Hassan	Assi Moidu, Anwara Sulthana		
A U G U S T	8	Kalki	Praveen Prabharam	Tovino Thomas, Samyuktha Menon, Sudheesh, Saiju Kurup		
A U G U S T	9	Ambili	John Paul George	Soubin Shahir, Naveen Nazim, Tanvi Ram		
A U G U S T	9	Olessia	Nazruddinshah	Anson Paul, Bindu Aneesh, Afzal Ali		
A U G U S T	16	Rameshan Oru Peralla	Sujith Vigneshwar	Krishna Kumar, Rajesh Sharma, Manikandan Pattambi, Krishnan Balakrishnan		
A U G U S T	23	Porinju Mariam Jose	Joshiy	Joju George, Nyla Usha, Chemban Vinod Jose, Vijayaraghavan		
A U G U S T	23	Pattabhiraman	Kannan Thamarakkulam	Jayaram, Miya George, Sheelu Abraham, Baiju Santhosh, Hareesh Kanaran		
A U G U S T	23	Kumbarees	Sagar Hari	Aswin Jose, Eldo, Ramesh Pisharody, Indrans, Tito Wilson		
A U G U S T	23	Mohabbathin Kunjabdulla	Shanu Samad	Indrans, Balu Vargheese, Nandhana Varma		
A U G U S T	23	Raktha Sakshyam	Bijulal	Jijoy Rajagopal, Divya Gopinath, Devi Ajith, Sunil Sukhada		
A U G U S T	30	Aniyankunjum Thannalayathu	Rajeev Nath	Nandu, Geetha, Abhirami, Indrans, Renji Panicker		
A U G U S T	30	Big Salute	A. K. B. Kumar	Dinesh Panicker, Ambika Mohan, Kalabhavan Rahman, Shanavas Shanu		
A U G U S T	30	Isakkinte Ithihasam	R. K. Ajayakumar	Siddique, Kalabhavan Shajon, Bhagath Manuel, Pashanam Shaji, Ashokan, Ambika Mohan		
A U G U S T	30	Ivide Ee Nagarathil	Padmendra Prasad	Biju Sopanam, Sreedhanya, Thanuja Karthik, Anandi Ramachandran		
A U G U S T	30	Poovalliyum Kunjadum	Farookh Ahamedali	Basil N. George, Arya Manikandan, Shammi Thilakan, Neena Kurup, Ambika Mohan		
S E P T E M B E R	5	Love Action Drama	Dhyan Sreenivasan	Nivin Pauly, Nayanthara, Aju Varghese		
S E P T E M B E R	6	Ittymaani: Made in China	Jibi - Joju	Mohanlal, Radhika Sarathkumar, K. P. A. C. Lalitha, Honey Rose, Aju Varghese, Dharmajan Bolgatty		
S E P T E M B E R	6	Brother's Day	Kalabhavan Shajon	Prithviraj Sukumaran, Aishwarya Lekshmi, Prayaga Martin, Madonna Sebastian, Prasanna		
S E P T E M B E R	6	Finals	P. R. Arun	Rajisha Vijayan, Suraj Venjarammood, Niranj Maniyanpilla Raju		
S E P T E M B E R	20	Oolu	Shaji N. Karun	Shane Nigam, Esther Anil, Indrans		
S E P T E M B E R	20	Pra Bra Bhra: Pranayam Brandy Bhranthu	M Chandramohan	Sree Hari, Sneha Chithi Rai, Rajeesh Rajan		
S E P T E M B E R	27	Gaana Gandharvan	Ramesh Pisharody	Mammooty, Vanditha Manoharan, Manoj K Jayan, Mukesh, Athulya Chandra		
S E P T E M B E R	27	Manoharam	Anwar Sadik	Vineeth Sreenivasan Aparna Das, Basil Joseph, Indrans		
S E P T E M B E R	27	March Randaam Vyazham	Jahangir Ummar	Shammi Thilakan, Saju Navodaya		
S E P T E M B E R	27	Ooha	Sreejith Panicker	Sreejith Panicker, Suriya Lakshmi		
S E P T E M B E R	27	Mr. Pavanayi 99.99	Captain Raju	Captain Raju, Devadevan, Pinky, Lintu Rony, Bheeman Raghu		
O C T O B E R	4	Jallikattu	Lijo Jose Pellisseri	Antony Varghese Pepe, Chemban Vinod, Santhy Balachandran, Sabumon Abdusamad		
O C T O B E R	4	Adhyarathri	Jibu Jacob	Biju Menon, Anaswara Rajan, Anu Sithara, Aju Varghese		
O C T O B E R	4	Pranaya Meenukalude Kadal	Kamal	Vinayakan, Dileesh Pothan, Riddhi Kumar		
O C T O B E R	4	Vikruthi	Emcy Joseph	Suraj Venjaramoodu, Soubin Shahir, Vincy Aloshious, Mamitha Baiju		
O C T O B E R	4	Orchid Pookal Paranja Kadha	Binoy John	Arthana Binu, Harish Thottil Palam, Giri Krishna		
O C T O B E R	11	Thureeyam	Jithin Kumbukattu	Jenny Pallath, Bhasi Thiruvalla, Jeeja Surendran, Joshy Mathew, Soorya J Menon		
O C T O B E R	18	Edakkad Battalion 06	Swapnesh K. Nair	Tovino Thomas, Samyuktha Menon, Divya Pillai, Salim Kumar, Shalu Rahim, Santhosh Keezhattoor		
O C T O B E R	18	Roudram 2018	Jayaraj	Renji Panicker, KPAC Leela, Nisha N P		
O C T O B E R	18	Ennodu Para I Love You Ennu	Nikhil Vahid	Iihan Layiq, Megha Mahesh, Al Sabith		
O C T O B E R	18	Mounaksharangal	Devdas Kallurutty	Master Asif Erattupetta, Baby Sreelakshmi		
O C T O B E R	18	Muthassikkoru Muthu	Anil Karakkulam	Kaviyoor Ponnamma, Prasanth Minerva, Chembil Ashokan, Shivaji Guruvayoor		
O C T O B E R	18	Safe	Pradeep Kalipurayath	Siju Wilson, Anusree, Aparna Gopinath, Aji John, Hareesh Peradi		
O C T O B E R	18	Take It Easy	AK Sathar	Anand Soorya, Shanoop Manacherri, Anil Vasudev		
O C T O B E R	18	Thelivu	M. A. Nishad	Asha Sarath, Sudheer Karamana, Nedumudi Venu, Lal, Renji Panicker, Joy Mathew		
O C T O B E R	25	Oru Kadath Naadan Katha	Peter Sajan	Shaheen Siddique, Pradeep Rawat, Abu Salim, Salim Kumar, Arya Ajith		
O C T O B E R	25	Marappava	T S Arun Giladi	T.S.Arun Giladi, Mallika, Vasanthi		
O C T O B E R	25	Vattamesha Sammelanam	Vipin Atley	Jibu Jacob, Jude Anthany Joseph, Mareena Michael Kurisingal, Sasi Kalinga, Anjali Nair, Sudhi Koppa, Saju Navodaya		
N O V E M B E R	1	Aakasha Ganga 2	Vinayan	Ramya Krishnan, Sreenath Bhasi, Vishnu Vijay, Salim Kumar, Dharmajan Bolgatty		
N O V E M B E R	1	Bhayam	Ajith	Adil Ibrahim, Hima Shankar, Manoj Guinness, Akshara Kishore		
N O V E M B E R	1	Under World	Arun Kumar Aravind	Asif Ali, Farhaan Faasil, Mukesh, Samyuktha Menon, Jean Paul Lal		
N O V E M B E R	1	Makkana	Raheem Khader	Indrans, Sajitha Madathil, Santhosh Keezhattoor, Kulappulli Leela		
N O V E M B E R	8	Moothon	Geetu Mohandas	Nivin Pauly, Sobhita Dhulipala, Roshan Mathew, Shashank Arora, Sanjana Dipu		
N O V E M B E R	8	Nalpathiyonnu (41)	Lal Jose	Biju Menon, Nimisha Sajayan, Saran Jith, Dhanya Ananya		
N O V E M B E R	8	Android Kunjappan Version 5.25	Ratheesh Balakrishnan Pothuval	Suraj Venjarammood, Soubin Shahir, Saiju Kurup, Kendy Zirdo		
N O V E M B E R	8	Lessons	Taj Bashir	Meera Vasudevan, Santhosh Keezhattoor, M A Nishad, Kalabhavan Rahman		
N O V E M B E R	8	Upama	S.S. Jishnu Dev	Sasikanthan, Nithin Noble, Jinu Celine, Manasa Prabhu,Anas J Rahim	Artist Films	
N O V E M B E R	15	Jack & Daniel	SL Puram Jayasurya	Dileep, Arjun Sarja, Anju Kurian		
N O V E M B E R	15	Helen	Mathukutty Xavier	Anna Ben, Lal, Aju Varghese, Noble Babu Thomas, Rony David Raj		
N O V E M B E R	22	Kettyolaanu Ente Maalakha	Nisam Basheer	Asif Ali, Veena Nandakumar, Basil Joseph, Raveendran		
N O V E M B E R	22	28	Jayan Naduvathazhath	Jackson AJ, Vinodh Mohanan, Anjith Merrie Jan, Sarath Prakash, Praveen Sukumaran		
N O V E M B E R	22	Vaarthakal Ithuvare	Manoj Nair	Vinay Forrt, Siju Wilson, Abhirami Bhargavan, Saiju Kurup		
N O V E M B E R	22	Sullu	Vishnu Bharadwaj	Vijay Babu, Anumol, Master Vasudev		
N O V E M B E R	22	Odunnon	Noushad Ibrahim	Santhosh Keezhattoor, Sivaji Guruvayoor, Rajesh Sharma		
N O V E M B E R	28	Happy Sardar	Sudip & Geethika	Kalidas Jayaram, Merin Philip, Sreenath Bhasi, Sidhique		
N O V E M B E R	28	Kamala	Ranjith Sankar	Aju Varghese, Ruhani Sharma, Anoop Menon		
N O V E M B E R	29	Puzhikkadakan	Gireesh Nair	Chemban Vinod, Dhanya Balakrishna, Balu Vargheese		
N O V E M B E R	29	Oru Mass Kadha Veendum	Gokul Karthik	Mamukoya, Dinesh Panicker, Charmila		
D E C E M B E R	6	Chola	Sanal Kumar Sasidharan	Joju George, Nimisha Sajayan, Akhil Viswanath		
D E C E M B E R	6	Thakkol	Kiron Prabhakaran	Indrajith Sukumaran, Murali Gopy, Iniya, Sudev Nair, Lal		
D E C E M B E R	6	Happy Christmas	Johny Adams	Spadikam George, Jaffar Idukki, Prasad Bindu, Saju Kodiyan		
D E C E M B E R	6	Ulta	Suresh Poduval	Gokul Suresh, Prayaga Martin, Anusree, Siddique, Shanthi Krishna		
D E C E M B E R	6	Jimmy Ee Veedinte Aishwaryam	Raju Chandra	Mithun Ramesh, Suraj Venjaramoodu, Divya Pillai		
D E C E M B E R	6	Munthiri Monchan: Oru Thavala Paranja Kadha	Vijith Nambiar	Manesh Krishnan, Gopika Anil, Salim Kumar, Innocent, Devan, Saleema		
D E C E M B E R	6	Udalaazham	Unnikrishnan Aavala	Anumol, Mani, Sajitha Madathil, Indrans		
D E C E M B E R	6	Kavachitham	Mahesh Menon	Natasha, Rohith Menon, A. Venkitesh, Kalasala Babu		
D E C E M B E R	6	Pathaam Classile Pranayam	Nitheesh K. Nair	Sunil Sukhada, Manoj Guinness, Kottayam Pradeep		
D E C E M B E R	6	Oru Nalla Kottayam Karan	Simon Kuruvila	Anjali Nair, Sreejith Vijay, Ashokan, Shaju Sreedhar, Neena Kurup		
D E C E M B E R	12	Mamangam	M. Padmakumar	Mammootty, Unni Mukundan, Prachi Tehlan, Siddique, Anu Sithara, Kaniha		
D E C E M B E R	13	Stand Up	Vidhu Vincent	Rajisha Vijayan, Nimisha Sajayan, Venkitesh, Arjun Ashokan		
D E C E M B E R	13	Freakens	Anish J. Karrinad	Biju Sopanam, Indrans, Niyas Backar		
D E C E M B E R	13	Oru Njayarazhcha	Shyamaprasad	Murali Chand, Sally Varma, Megha Thomas, Niranjan Kannan		
D E C E M B E R	20	Driving License	Lal Jr.	Prithviraj Sukumaran, Suraj Venjaramoodu, Miya George, Deepti Sati		
D E C E M B E R	20	Prathi Poovankozhi	Roshan Andrews	Manju Warrier, Anusree, Roshan Andrews, Alencier Ley Lopez, Saiju Kurup		
D E C E M B E R	20	Valiyaperunnal	Dimal Dennis	Shane Nigam, Himika Bose, Joju George, Atul Kulkarni		
D E C E M B E R	20	Thrissur Pooram	Rajesh Mohanan	Jayasurya, Swathi reddy, Sabumon Abdulsamad, Vijay Babu, Sudev Nair		
D E C E M B E R	25	My Santa	Sugeeth	Dileep, Sunny Wayne, Manasvi Kottachi, Anaswara Rajan, Anusree, Siddique		

== Dubbed films ==
Films that are dubbed into Malayalam
Opening	Title	Director(s)	Original film		Cast	Ref.
Opening	Title	Director(s)	Film	Language	Cast	Ref.
23 February	Vinaya Vidheya Rama	Boyapati Srinu	Vinaya Vidheya Rama	Telugu	Ram Charan Tej, Kiara Advani, Vivek Oberoi, Prashanth	
23 February	Yatra	Mahi V. Raghav	Yatra	Telugu	Mammootty, Jagapati Babu, Anasuya Bharadwaj, Sachin Khedekar, Suhasini Maniratnam	
21 June	Rangasthalam	Sukumar	Rangasthalam	Telugu	Ram Charan Tej, Samantha Akkineni, Aadhi Pinisetty, Anasuya Bharadwaj, Prakash Raj, Jagapati Babu	
26 July	Dear Comrade	Bharat Kamma	Dear Comrade	Telugu	Vijay Deverakonda, Rashmika Mandanna, Shruthi Ramachandran, Jayaprakash, Sukanya	
18 October	Kurukshetra	Naganna	Kurukshetra	Kannada	Darshan, Arjun, V. Ravichandran, Ambareesh, Shashikumar, Sneha, Meghana Raj, Sonu Sood	
30 August	Saaho	Sujeeth	Saaho	Telugu	Prabhas, Shraddha Kapoor, Lal, Jackie Shroff, Neil Nitin Mukesh	
2 October	Sye Raa Narasimha Reddy	Surender Reddy	Sye Raa Narasimha Reddy	Telugu	Chiranjeevi, Amitabh Bachchan, Sudeep, Vijay Sethupathi, Jagapathi Babu, Nayanthara, Tamannaah Bhatia, Anushka Shetty	
1 November	Terminator: Dark Fate	Tim Miller	Terminator: Dark Fate	English	Arnold Schwarzenegger	
31 December	Avan Srimannarayana	Sachin	Avane Srimannarayana	Kannada	Rakshit Shetty, Shanvi Srivastava, Achyuth Kumar	

== Notable deaths ==
Celebrities died during the year
Month	Date	Name	Age	Profession	Notable films	Ref.
January	14	Lenin Rajendran	67	Director, screenwriter	Daivathinte Vikrithikal	
January	17	S. Balakrishnan	69	Music director	Ramji Rao Speaking • In Harihar Nagar • Godfather • Vietnam Colony • Mohabbath	
January	18	John Anthony	69	Musician	Poochakkoru Mookkuthi • Engirundho Vandhan • Chithram • Vandanam	
February	9	Mahesh Anand	57	Actor	Abhimanyu • The Godman • Oottyppattanam • Praja	
February	24	Nayana Sooryan	29	Director	Pakshikalude Manam	
March	22	K. G. Rajasekharan	72	Director	Padmatheertham • Velluvili • Maattuvin Chattangale •Simhadhwani	
March	26	Shafeer Sait	44	Actor, producer, production controller	Aathmakatha • Onnum Mindathe	
June	29	Babu Naryanan	59	Director	Valkanadi • Uthaman	
July	12	M. J. Radhakrishnan	61	Cinematographer	Veettilekkulla Vazhi • Veettilekkulla Vazhi	
September	17	Sathaar	67	Actor	Thachiledathu Chundan • 22 Female Kottayam • Natholi Oru Cheriya Meenalla	
November	12	Raju Mathew	82	Producer, distributor	Thanmathra • Athiran	
December	21	Ramachandra Babu	72	Cinematographer	Oru Vadakkan Veeragatha • Nirmalyam • Professor Dinkan	
