= Dilli Dark =

Indian drama film

- Directed by: Dibakar Das Roy
- Written by: Dibakar Das Roy
- Produced by: Reeligion Films
- Starring: Samuel Abiola Robinson
- Cinematography: Kartik Parmar
- Edited by: Manendra Singh Lodhi
- Music by: Utkarsh Dhotekar
- Distributed by: Panorama Studios
- Release dates: November 2023 (Mami); 30 May 2025 (Worldwide)
- Country: India
- Languages: English; Hindi

Dilli Dark (transl. Dark Delhi) is a 2025 Indian English-Hindi-bilingual language drama film directed by Dibakar Das Roy and starring Samuel Abiola Robinson, Geetika Vidya Ohylan and Shantanu Anam. The film was initially released in 2023 at various film festivals. Dilli Dark had its global theatrical release on May 30, 2025.

== Plot ==
Adorable African outsider Michael Okeke left Nigeria six years ago to survive in the frequently disconnected and overcrowded New Delhi, a city with which he has a bittersweet relationship. He dreams of true love and a better job but is pushed into the 4 C-s: cell phone, cocaine, cash, and clients.

The film follows Michael Okeke, a Nigerian living in Delhi, who tries to overcome racism and stereotypes while searching for stable employment and a better life in the city.

== Cast ==
- Samuel Abiola Robinson as Michael "Mike" Okeke
- Geetika Vidya Ohylan as Mansi
- Shantanu Anam as Debu
- Stutee Ghosh

== Production ==
The film began production at the end of 2020. The project was selected for NFDC Work-in-progress Lab. The film was shot in 2021.

== Themes and influences ==
The director incorporated Queen Razia Sultana's love story with the struggles of the protagonist since she was speculated to be in love with an African, which was not acceptable in society at that time.

== Release ==
The film debuted at the MAMI festival in November 2023 and the Tallinn Black Nights Film Festival later that month. The film was the closing feature at the 31st New York African Film Festival in May 2024.

== Reception ==
=== Critical response ===
Dilli Dark premiered at film festivals in 2023 before its global theatrical release in May 2025, receiving generally positive reviews from critics.

==== Festival screenings (2023) ====
At the Tallinn Black Nights Film Festival:

- Dirty Movies rated the film 4/5, calling it "an impressively inventive work, one that reveres and chastises India in equal measure".
- Eye For Film rated it 3/5 stars, noting that it "wraps this [racism] issue up within a boisterous, if unruly, comedy" while suggesting that "streamlining the plot would have helped to keep the pace from flagging".

The film served as the closing feature at the 31st New York African Film Festival in May 2024.

==== Theatrical release (2025) ====
Following its global release on 30 May 2025:

- The Times of India (3.5/5) praised "its strong messaging layered with satire"
- The Hollywood Reporter India highlighted it as "a neat black comedy with Delhi-shaped angst"
- Outlook India described it as "a refreshing caricature piercing racial prejudices"
- The New Indian Express noted its exploration of "outsider syndrome", calling it "a film about dark horses that subvert expectations"
- Scroll.in offered a mixed perspective, describing it as "an occasionally sharp, scattershot comedy about prejudice"
