= Hareendran Oru Nishkalankan =

- Directed by: Vinayan
- Written by: Vishnu Vinay (story) Vinayan (screenplay)
- Produced by: Satish Nair
- Starring: Indrajith Sukumaran; Jayasurya; Manikuttan
- Cinematography: Venugopalan
- Edited by: G. Murali
- Music by: songs Berny-Ignatious: Background score Bijipal
- Release date: 16 November 2007
- Country: India
- Language: Malayalam

Hareendran Oru Nishkalankan (transl. Hareendran, an innocent) is a 2007 Indian Malayalam-language crime drama mystery thriller film directed by Vinayan and written by Vishnu Vinayan, based on his own comic book. The movie stars Indrajith Sukumaran and Jayasurya in the lead roles.

== Plot ==
The movie is narrated by Hareendra Varma, a rich young businessman. He is acquitted by the court in a sensational murder case. He begins narrating his story on the morning of the date of a person's death sentence.

GK alias Gopalakrishnan is Hareendran's close friend who thinks money is the only important thing in life. He used to work sincerely for Hareendran's company, Starline Software Incorporates. Hareendran got a proposal from Indu, the daughter of a rich businessman. GK and his girlfriend, Pooja, help Hareendran in meeting Indu and discussing things since Hareendran is a shy guy. Alex, who is an idealist, is in love with Indu. Nevertheless, they have silly quarrels, and many times, their respective egos do not permit them to move forward in their relationship. How GK, using Pooja, tarnishes Hareendran's reputation and life and Hareendran getting entangled in a murder case forms the rest of the story.

== Cast ==
- Indrajith Sukumaran as O. G. Hareendra Varma
- Jayasurya as Gopalakrishnan (G.K),The Main Antagonist
- Manikuttan as Alex
- Sherin Shringar as Pooja Vasudevan
- Bhama as Indulekha
- Jagathy Sreekumar as "Gulf" Vasudevan
- Salim Kumar as Rajendran Vazhayila
- Cochin Haneefa
- Majeed as Indu's father
- Narayanankutty as Hareendran's servant
- Tini Tom as James
- Bala as Commissioner Rajan Joseph IPS
- Ambika as Hareendran's mother
- Suja Menon as Indu's friend

== Soundtrack ==
The music was composed by Berny-Ignatius, and the lyrics were written by Sarath Vayalar and Rajeev Alunkal.

No.	Song	Singers	Lyrics	Length (m:ss)
1	"Kannipenne"	M. G. Sreekumar	Sarath Vayalar	
2	"Kannipenne" (D)	M. G. Sreekumar, Gayathri Varma	Sarath Vayalar	
3	"Love Me Love Me"	Rimi Tomy, Shelton Pinheiro, Susan	Rajeev Alunkal	
4	"Nenjile Sanchaari"	Chorus, Cicily	Rajeev Alunkal	

== Reception ==
A critic from Sify noted that "On the whole Vinayan had a very topical issue, which after his commercial packaging for entertainment purpose lost its focus and fizzled out. Better luck next time!". Paresh C. Palicha of Rediff.com rated the film 1.5 out of 5 stars and opined that "Vinayan may have got his heart in the right place in doing this film, but it lacks the head".
