= Prem Poojari =

- Directed by: Hariharan
- Written by: Dr. Balakrishnan
- Starring: Kunchacko Boban; Shalini; Vineeth; Thilakan
- Cinematography: K. P. Nambiathiri
- Edited by: M. S. Mani
- Music by: Uttam Singh
- Release date: 9 April 1999
- Running time: 172 minutes
- Country: India
- Language: Malayalam

Prem Poojari is a 1999 Indian Malayalam-language romance film directed by Hariharan, starring Kunchacko Boban, Shalini and Vineeth. The plot is loosely based on Engane Nee Marakkum. Prem Poojari is the third collaboration of the leading pair, Kunchacko and Shalini.

== Plot ==
Prem Jacob wants to become a singer but is forced to pretend as a Brahmin to get a home for rent. There he meet Hema. Hema drew a picture of a rose on his shirt and gives him sweets. She gave him a note, writing Mandan (fool) as he does not notice her love. Prem gets angry and meets Hema in a park and angrily kisses her. Hema gets angry and says that she will tell her relatives. Prem becomes afraid and begs her forgiveness and said that he is ready for any punishment. Hema kisses his hands and they hug revealing their love.

Later Prem tells Hema that he is a Christian but she does not care. Prem gets a chance as a playback singer. Hema is being forced to marry Murali. Prem wins the national award for his song and when he sings in a program, Hema emotionally hugs him. Murali becomes angry and hurts Hema. Her relatives call off the wedding and agree that Prem and Hema can marry. Then Prem's friend Chanjal says that Murali is great as he understood Hema's love for Prem and was only acting to help them get united. Hema and Prem rushes to the airport and thank Murali as he was going back.

== Cast ==
- Kunchacko Boban as Prem Jacob / Premanathan Namboothiri
- Shalini as Hema
- Vineeth as Murali
- Captain Raju as Hema's father
- Thilakan as Prem's grandfather and Music director
- Jagathy Sreekumar as Pattabhi
- Oduvil Unnikrishnan as Bhairavan, Chanchal's father
- Sudheesh as Prem's friend
- Sukumari as Hema's grandmother
- Mayoori as Chanchal
- Mamukkoya as Kidavu
- Reshmi Soman as Priya, Murali's sister
- Mammootty as himself (cameo- song-Kathil Vellichittu)
- Khushbu - Herself (Cameo- Song-Kathil vellichittu)
- Suresh Gopi - Himself (cameo- song-Kathil Vellichittu)
- Sukanya - Herself (Cameo- Song-Kathil vellichittu)
- Manoj K. Jayan - Guest appearance as a singer
- Chakyar Rajan as Sundaraman Iyer
- Master Gokul as Kicha
- KTS Namboodiri as Subbu
- Dr. Siddhan as Kalyanaraman
- Faisal Rasy

== Songs ==
The soundtrack features songs composed by Uttam Singh, who is famous for his music in Dil To Pagal Hai and lyrics by O. N. V. Kurup.

No.	Title	Singers	Length
1.	"Aayiram Varnamaayi"	K. J. Yesudas; K. S. Chithra
2.	"Devaraagame"	P. Jayachandran; K. S. Chithra
3.	"Humming and Swarangal"	K. J. Yesudas; K. S. Chithra
4.	"Kathil Vellichittu"	K. J. Yesudas; K. S. Chithra
5.	"Maanthalirin Pattu (M)"	K. J. Yesudas
6.	"Mathi Mounam Veene"	K. S. Chithra
7.	"Panineeru Peyyum Nilaavil"	K. J. Yesudas; K. S. Chithra
8.	"Maanthalirin Pattu (F)"	K. S. Chithra

== Reception ==
A critic rated the film 3/5 and wrote that "Prem Poojari is a good comedy for the first 90 minutes but after that the movie drags for the next hour".
