= Raghunath Seth =

- Born: Pandit Raghunath Seth; 1931; Gwalior, India
- Died: 15 February 2014 (aged 83) Mumbai, India
- Genres: Hindustani classical music
- Occupations: Musician, composer
- Instrument: Bansuri
- Formerly of: Suns of Arqa

Pandit Raghunath Seth (1931 – 15 February 2014) was a noted Indian exponent of Hindustani classical music through the medium of Bansuri, or bamboo flute; he was also a noted film score composer. He has received Sangeet Natak Akademi Award in 1994, given by Sangeet Natak Akademi, India's National Academy for Music, Dance and Drama.

== Early life and training ==
Born in Gwalior in 1931, he started his music training from his elder brother Kashi Prasad, at the age of 12, and went on to train under eminent musicologist Dr. S. N. Ratanjankar and principal of Bhatkhande Music Institute (Bhatkande Sangeet Sansthan) in Lucknow. Later at the age of 19 he moved to Mumbai, where he learnt under Pandit Pannalal Ghosh of Maihar gharana.

== Career ==
He was an Indian Classical Music Bamboo Flautist. His flute composition "Music to help you sleep" from the album Nidra has over 5.5 million views on YouTube.

His filmography included songs by stalwarts like Yesudas, Lata Mangeshkar, Asha Bhosle, Anuradha Paudwal, Chithra, Kavita Krishnamurty, Alka Yagnik, Bhupinder, Suresh Wadkar, Hariharan, Udit Narayan and more. "Yeh Paudhay Yeh Pattay", from the film "Ek Baar Phir", has been documented as Anuradha Paudwal's first film song.

His private albums included songs by Talat Mehmood, Asha Bhosle, Vani Jairam, Arti Mukherjee, Talat Aziz, Peenaz Masani, Sudha Malhotra, Hari Om Sharan and Sharma Bandhu.

He scored music for around 2000 documentary films and many television serials. Several of them like, 'Ocean to Sky, 'The Last Tiger', 'Mughal Gardens' & 'Death Sentence' were widely recognised for their music scores as well. He also composed songs for the 1988 Malayalam film 'Aaranyakam', directed by Malayalam film director Hariharan, with lyrics by the late Malayalam poet O. N. V. Kurup.

As a flute professional, he has raised children, many of whom have gone on to follow musical pursuits including: his son Apurva Shrivastava, Steve Gorn, Rao Kyao, Chris Hinze, Clive Bell, Sunil Gupta, Krishna Bhandari, Joshua Geisler, Chetan Joshi, Atul Sharma and Datta Chaughule.

== Death ==
He died on February 15, 2014, in Mumbai, at the age of 83.
