= Samuel Abiola Robinson =

Nigerian actor (born 1998)

- Born: Samuel Abiola Robinson; 30 June 1998 (age 28); Lagos, Nigeria
- Education: Grait International College
- Occupation: Actor
- Years active: 2013–present
- Notable work: Green White Green; Sudani from Nigeria

Samuel Abiola Robinson (born 30 June 1998) is a Nigerian actor who appears in Nollywood and Indian films. He is best known for his role from the 2018 Malayalam movie Sudani from Nigeria, directed by Zakariya Mohammed.

== Personal life ==
Robinson attended Grait Secondary School but put off university to pursue a career as a professional actor.

== Career ==
Samuel's career as an actor began in 2013. He has appeared in several major productions in Africa such as Walt Disney's Desperate Housewives Africa, M-Net's Tinsel, MTV Base's Shuga and Raconteur Production's 8 Bars And A Clef to name a few.

He became the first African Actor to play a leading role in Indian cinema when he featured in an Indian film, the 2018 film Sudani from Nigeria, with Indian actor Soubin Shahir.

In 2024, he was seen as Kendrick in Tamil movie Sorgavaasal.

In 2025 Samuel had his leading debut in Hindi Cinema as Michael Okeke in Dilli Dark directed by Dibakar Das Roy

== Filmography ==
=== Film ===
Year	Title	Role	Language	Notes
2015	8 Bars & A Clef	Young Victor	English	
2016	Green White Green	Segun	English	
2018	Sudani from Nigeria	Samuel Abiola Robinson / Sudani	Malayalam	Debut Indian movie
2019	Oru Caribbean Udayippu	Samuel (Tik Tak)	Malayalam	
2024	Sorgavaasal	Kendrick	Tamil	
2025	Dilli Dark	Michael Okeke	English; Hindi	Debut as Solo Lead

=== Television ===
Year	Title	Role	Notes
2014	Tinsel	Gogo	
2015	Shuga	Ozzy	
2015	The MiddleMen	Amos	
2015	Desperate Housewives Africa	Akin Bello	
2017	The Governor	Toju Ochello	

=== Short films ===
Year	Title	Role	Notes
2013	Playing Victim	Tekena	
