= Bharya Veettil Paramasukham =

- Directed by: Rajan Sithara
- Written by: Rafeeq Seelat
- Screenplay by: Rafeeq Seelat
- Starring: Vijayaraghavan; Mayoori; Jagathy Sreekumar; Rajan P. Dev; Chithra
- Cinematography: Utpal V. Nayanar
- Edited by: K. Rajagopal
- Production company: Sunrise Movies
- Distributed by: Sunrise Movies
- Release date: 19 March 1999
- Country: India
- Language: Malayalam

Bharya Veettil Paramasukham is a 1999 Indian Malayalam film, directed by Rajan Sithara. The film stars Vijayaraghavan and Mayoori in the lead roles.

== Cast ==
- Vijayaraghavan as Ramankutti
- Rajan P. Dev as Anakkadu Vasu/Anakkadu Pappan
- Jagathy Sreekumar as Sadhashivan
- Sudheesh as Puthooramvettil Unnikrishnan/Unnikuttan
- Harishree Ashokan as Shiyami
- Chithra as Puthooramvettil Durgadevi
- Mayoori as Puthooramvettil Maya
- Devi Chandana as Gayathri
- Priyanka as Puthooramvettil Padminidevi
- Kundara Johnny as Ramabhadran
- Manuraj
- Philomina as Bhargavi
- Mafia Sasi

== Soundtrack ==
The music was composed by Jerson Antony and the lyrics were written by Ranjith Mattanchery.

No.	Song	Singers	Lyrics	Length (m:ss)
1	"Kannil"			
