= Aana Alaralodalaral =

- Theatrical release poster
- Directed by: Dileep Menon
- Written by: Sarath Balan
- Produced by: Siby Thottupuram; Navis Xaviour
- Starring: Dileep; Vineeth Sreenivasan; Anu Sithara
- Cinematography: Deepu S Unni
- Edited by: Manoj
- Music by: Shaan Rahman
- Production company: Poetry Film House
- Distributed by: Kalasangham Films
- Release date: 22 December 2017
- Running time: 120 minutes
- Country: India
- Language: Malayalam

Aana Alaralodalaral is a 2017 Malayalam language comedy film produced by Poetry Film House. The film is directed by Dileep Mohan (in his directorial debut) and stars Dileep in a titular voice role with Vineeth Sreenivasan and Anu Sithara, Thesni Khan,Suraj Venjaramood, Innocent, Vijayaraghavan,Vishak Nair and Hareesh Kanaran. The music is composed by Shaan Rahman. The film is based on a story written by Sarath Balan.

== Plot ==
The story revolves around Shekarankutty, the new elephant bought by Padmanabhan Thampi. The whole village is excited to be around the animal. The atmosphere changes as Hashim, comrade Jalaludin's son, is accused of stealing Shekarankutty's golden 'elas'. Velayudhan uses this opportunity to seek vengeance against his enemy, Jalaludhin, by accusing Hashim. The situation forces Jalaludin and his family to flee. Later, Shekarankutty is disowned by Thampi and is handed over to Hashim who returns to the village to claim ownership. Hashim and Parvaty, Thampi's daughter, have a love affair. The ownership of the elephant gets exchanged with different people from different religions, and at last, Shekarankutty himself has to choose his real owner. The story comes to an end picturing the acts people do in the name of religion.

== Cast ==
Voice cast

- Dileep as Shekhrankutty / KunjiKaadhar. Elephant Voice over

Actors

- Vineeth Sreenivasan as Hashim, Shekhrankutty's Master
- Anu Sithara as Parvathy, Shekhrankutty's Master & Hashim's lover
- Suraj Venjaramoodu as Velayudhan
- Vishak Nair as Achootty
- Thezni Khan as Hajara Beevi
- Innocent as Pathrose
- Vijayaraghavan as Stalin Prabhakaran
- Hareesh Perumanna as Dasharathan
- Bijukuttan as Eenasu's Assistant
- Dharmajan Bolgatty as Inzamam Imran Khan
- Trichur Elsi as Plamena
- Vinod Kedamangalam as Ponnappan
- Saju Kodiyan as Black Magician
- Mammukoya as Ibrahim
- Srikant Murali as Jamaludeen
- Murugan as Panicker
- Priyankb as Black Magician
- Sreejith Ravi as Eenasu
- Naseer Sankranthi as Kunji Pokker
- Manju Sunichen as Kunji Pokker's Wife
- Manju Vani as Snehalatha
- Manjusha Sajish
