= Momo in Dubai =

2023 Malayalam film

- Theatrical release poster
- Directed by: Ameen Aslam
- Written by: Zakariya Mohammed; Ashif Kakkodi
- Produced by: Zakariya Mohammed; Harris Desom; P.B. Anish; Nahla Al Fahad
- Starring: Athrey Baiju Raj; Anu Sithara; Johny Antony; Aneesh G. Menon
- Cinematography: Sajith Purushan
- Edited by: Ratheesh Raj
- Music by: Jassie Gift; Gafoor M. Khayyam; Yakzan Gary Pereira; Neha Nair
- Production companies: Imagine Cinemas; Cross Border Camera
- Distributed by: Icon Cinemas
- Release date: 3 February 2023
- Country: India
- Language: Malayalam

Momo In Dubai is a 2023 Indian Malayalam-language film directed by Ameen Aslam and produced by Zakariya Mohammed, Haris Desom, P. B. Aneesh and Nahla Al Fahad under the banners Imagine Cinemas and Cross Border Camera. The movie features Athrey Baiju Raj in the titular role with Anu Sithara, Johny Antony, Aneesh G. Menon as supporting cast. The film was released on 3 February 2023.

== Plot ==
Momo in Dubai revolves around a Malayalee kid named Momo who dreams of visiting Burj Khalifa someday.

== Cast ==
- Athrey Baiju Raj as Muhammed a.k.a. Momo
- Anu Sithara as Khadeeja, Momo's mother
- Aneesh G. Menon as Habeeb a.k.a. Muthutty, Momo's father
- Johny Antony as Hussain Mama
- Najin as Dhillu, Momo's brother
- Arafa Rahman as Shana, Momo's sister
- Mubarak Mashi as Abdullah
- Sruthy Jayan as Teacher
- Ahammed Yahiya Izawi as safety officer
- Jennifer Castro as Jennifer
- Bhanumathi Payyannur as Grandmother
- Mani Mash as Grandfather

== Production ==
The film was announced in December 2020 with Zakariya Mohammed as writer and producer. Ameen Aslam would direct the movie with Ashif Kakkodi as co-writer. Emirati Filmmaker Nahla Al Fahad joined the movie as co-producer. On associating with the film, she said:

"I have always wanted to push boundaries with cinema and team up with filmmakers from India, Syria, Lebanon or any other country. India was a great choice because of our shared love for the movies as well as the ties between the two countries."

Principal photography started on 5 October 2021 in Dubai. Shoot was wrapped on 15 November 2021. The first look poster of the film was revealed on the occasion of Children's Day, 14 November 2021. The trailer was released on 18 January 2023. Ameen Aslam mentioned that the film will be a Children's film in an interview with Times of India.

== Release ==
The film released in theatres on 3 February 2023. The digital rights of the film is acquired by ManoramaMAX and started streaming from 17 March 2023.

== Reception ==
Conceived as a Children's film, The movie generally received positive reviews. Gopika I.S. of Times of india rated the movie 3.5 stars out of 5 and wrote "Ameen Aslam succeeds in bringing forth the emotions of children and subsequently their parents when they realise their dreams". Vignesh Madhu of The New Indian Express stated that "The film literally ends on a high ensuring the audience leaves the cinema hall with moist eyes" and gave 3.5 out 5 stars.

== Music ==
The film features songs composed by Jassie Gift, Gafoor M. Khayyam, Yakzan Gary Pereira and Neha Nair. The film score is composed by Yakzan Gary Pereira and Neha Nair. Lyrics were penned by B. K. Harinarayanan, Ameen Karakkunnu and Dr. Hikmathulla.

Momo In Dubai

Soundtrack album by Jassie Gift, Gafoor M. Khayyam, Yakzan Gary Pereira and Neha Nair
- Released: 27 March 2023
- Genre: Feature film soundtrack
- Length: 19:38
- Language: Malayalam
- Label: Saregama India Limited
- Producer: Jassie Gift; Gafoor M. Khayyam; Yakzan Gary Pereira; Neha Nair

Jassie Gift chronology
Khaki Pada (2022)	Momo In Dubai (2023)

Yakza Gary Pereira and Neha Nair chronology
Vaashi (2022)	Momo In Dubai (2023)

External audio
- Original Motion Picture Soundtrack, from Spotify

Momo In Dubai
No.	Title	Lyrics	Music	Singer(s)	Length
1.	"Thankakatti (Promo Song)"	B. K. harinarayanan	Jassie Gift	Jassie Gift; Jyotsna Radhakrishnan	02:36
2.	"Kurukum Nooru Pravin"	Ameen Karakkunnu	Yakzan Gary Pereira and Neha Nair	Vaikom Vijayalakshmi	03:33
3.	"Kirukkinaale"	Ameen Karakkunnu	Yakzan Gary Pereira and Neha Nair	Zia Ul Haq	03:36
4.	"Ormakal"	Dr. Hikmathulla	Gafoor M. Khayyam	Shahabaz Aman	03:36
5.	"Vaa Paravakale"	B. K. Harinarayanan	Jassie Gift	Anne Amie	03:24
Total length:					19:38
