= Pottas Bomb =

- Directed by: Suresh Achoos
- Written by: Suresh Achoos
- Produced by: People Cinema
- Starring: Tini Tom; Priyanka; Indrans; Irshad; Kottayam Naseer; Vishnu Unnikrishnan; Rajiv Rajan; Achu Arun Kumar; Rohit Menon
- Cinematography: Neil D'Cunha
- Edited by: Shibish K. Chandran
- Music by: Mohan Sithara
- Distributed by: Mahadeva Cinemas
- Release date: 25 October 2013
- Country: India
- Language: Malayalam

Pottas Bomb is a 2013 Indian Malayalam-language drama film written and directed by Suresh Achoos.

== Plot ==
The film narrates the story of four boys who ran away from a juvenile home and get involved in a murder.

== Cast ==
- Vishnu Unnikrishnan as Musthafa
- Mohith Sharma as Balu
- Anu Sithara as Aswathy
- Tini Tom as CI Santhosh Kumar.
- Priyanka as CI Santhosh Kumar's friend.(a social activist & writer)
- Indrans as Rayappan.
- Irshad as Babby Thomas
- Kottayam Naseer as PA Mohanan.
- Shibil Paravath as Juvenile Boy
