= Mayoori (actress) =

Indian actress

- Born: August 1983; Kolkata, West Bengal, India
- Died: 16 June 2005 (aged 21–22); Chennai, Tamil Nadu, India
- Other name: Shalini
- Occupation: Actress
- Years active: 1998–2005

Mayoori (August 1983 – 17 June 2005), credited as Shalini in Tamil films, was an Indian actress who appeared in Malayalam, Tamil and Kannada films from 1998 to 2005. She did major roles in films such as Summer in Bethlehem, Aakasha Ganga, Prem Poojari and Sarvabhouma.

Mayoori completed her schooling in Bangalore. She pursued a bacherlor's degree in economics from Ethiraj College for Women, Chennai. In 2005, she died by suicide at the age of 22.

== Filmography ==
Year	Film	Role	Language	Notes
1998	Kumbakonam Gopalu	Geetha	Tamil	
1998	Summer in Bethlehem	Gayathri	Malayalam	
1999	Aakasha Ganga	Ganga	Malayalam	
1999	Bharya Veettil Paramasukham	Maya	Malayalam	
1999	Chandamama	Annie	Malayalam	
1999	Prem Poojari	Chanchal	Malayalam	
2000	Arayannangalude Veedu	Ragini	Malayalam	
2000	Summer Palace	Reshmi	Malayalam	
2001	Chethaaram	Panchali	Malayalam	
2001	Neela	Chandri	Kannada	Kannada debut
2003	Whistle	Sharmi	Tamil	
2004	Pudhukottaiyilirundhu Saravanan		Tamil	
2004	7G Rainbow Colony	Special appearance	Tamil	In "Naam Vayathukku Vanthom" song
2004	Manmadhan	Malathi	Tamil	
2004	Aai	Kanmani	Tamil	
2004	7G Brindavan Colony	Special appearance	Telugu	In "Mem Vayasuku Vachcham" song
2004	Sarvabhouma	Basanthi	Kannada	
2005	Kana Kandaen	Madan's fake wife	Tamil	
2014	Tharangal	Herself	Malayalam	Archive footage Photo only
2019	Aakasha Ganga 2	Ganga	Malayalam	Archive footage Recreated version

== Television ==
- Ilayaval Gayathri (photo only)
- Kadamattathu Kathanar as Kalyani
- Salanam as Sandhya
- Sthree as Malini
