= Kurukkan Rajavayi =

- Directed by: P. Chandrakumar
- Starring: Mukesh; Maniyanpilla Raju; Saleema; Jagathy Sreekumar
- Music by: A. T. Ummer
- Production company: Roshni Movies
- Distributed by: Roshni Movies
- Release date: 16 January 1987
- Country: India
- Language: Malayalam

Kurukkan Rajavayi (transl. Fox became the King) is a 1987 Indian Malayalam-language throughout comedy film directed by P. Chandrakumar. The film stars Mukesh, Maniyanpilla Raju, Saleema and Jagathy Sreekumar in the lead roles. The film has musical score by A. T. Ummer.

== Plot ==
Prathapan Nair (Mukesh) and Rajendran Nair (Maniyanpilla Raju) are cousins and roommates. While they were bathing in a stream they accidentally find a dead body(Oduvil Unnikrishnan). A series of comic events forms the rest of the movie.

== Cast ==
- Mukesh as Prathapan Nair
- Maniyanpilla Raju as Rajendran Nair
- Saleema
- Jagathy Sreekumar
- Kuthiravattam Pappu as Tea Shop owner
- Oduvil Unnikrishnan
- Sathaar
- T.G Ravi
- Soorya
- Bahadoor as Rajendran's father

== Soundtrack ==
The music was composed by A. T. Ummer and the lyrics were written by Poovachal Khader.

No.	Song	Singers	Lyrics	Length (m:ss)
1	"Moham Nee"	Ashalatha, Krishnachandran, Oduvil Unnikrishnan	Poovachal Khader	
2	"Thaarunyathin Vaniyil"	S. Janaki	Poovachal Khader	
