= Neerali =

2018 Indian Malayalam-language film

- Theatrical release poster
- Directed by: Ajoy Varma
- Written by: Saju Thomas
- Produced by: Santhosh T. Kuruvilla; Praveen Kattukaran; Mibu Jose Nettikadan
- Starring: Mohanlal; Nadhiya; Parvatii Nair; Suraj Venjaramoodu
- Cinematography: Santosh Thundiyil
- Edited by: Ajoy Varma; Sajit Unnikrishnan
- Music by: Songs: Stephen Devassy; Background Score: Ronnie Raphael
- Production company: Moonshot Entertainments
- Distributed by: Moonshot Entertainments
- Release date: 13 July 2018 (India)
- Running time: 123 minutes
- Country: India
- Language: Malayalam

Neerali (Theatrical title: Nieraali; transl. Octopus) is a 2018 Indian Malayalam-language survival thriller film directed and co-edited by Ajoy Varma from a screenplay by Saju Thomas, with Mohanlal in the lead role. The film was produced and distributed by Moonshot Entertainments. It began principal photography on 9 January 2018 in Mumbai and was completed in February. The film was released in India on 13 July 2018.The film is inspired from the 2010 Canadian film Wrecked. This movie was a box-office bomb.

== Plot ==
Sunny George is a gemologist, working in Kandy. His wife Molly is hospitalized back in their native place, as she has gone into labour, and they are expecting twins. Sunny hurries to the hospital in an old jeep, with one of his close aides, Veerappan.

Veerappan is driving the vehicle. While driving hastily through a spooky forest area, Veerappan loses control of the vehicle, in an attempt to save a man on the road, he collides with a truck. The jeep glissade, and is on the edge of a cliff, with the front tyres hanging in the air, above a deep sunken valley.

Veerappan is completely broken and is hanging with the help of a seat belt. While a frightened Sunny is unable to do anything. He tries all possible means, but to no avail. Even talking with a monkey and to come face to face with a venomous cobra.

Runs parallel is their personal story. Sunny and Molly are expecting a child after 12 years. Sunny have a connection with office colleague Naina. She is suffering from a psychological problem. She is obsessive about Sunny, while he treats her as his friend. He calls her but Naina deliberately hangs up, because of ignoring her in the past. We also see Veerappan was carrying diamonds worth millions and a few guys were following him during the ride. As he has done some dealing with them, for the sake of money so that he can get back his daughter's medals which was taken away by some goons.

When it nears morning, Veerappan dies and by mistake falls off the clip. Sunny is shattered. When he finds that the jeep is about to fall he jumps and gets hold of a branch. The jeep slides down. After hanging for a few minutes, few police officers rescues him.

Sunny comes to the hospital and learns that he is blessed with twins as expected. He is happy to be back with Molly. We also get to know that Naina was the one who called the Police. Sunny apologizes and thanks her for her selfless deed. In the end, Sunny adopts Veerappan's daughter and hands off her the medals, her dad always wished to give her.

== Cast ==
- Mohanlal as Sunny George
- Suraj Venjaramoodu as Veerappan
- Nadhiya as Mollykutty
- Parvatii Nair as Naina
- Dileesh Pothan as Rajan
- Santosh T Kuruvila as Doctor
- Sandeep Narayanan as Sando
- Bineesh Kodiyeri
- Nassar as George
- Megha Mathew

== Production ==
Neerali was financed by Santhosh T. Kuruvilla under his company Moonshot Entertainments, and co-produced by Praveen Kattukaran and Mibu Jose Nettikadan. It was written by Saju Thomas. Ajoy Varma makes his directorial debut in Malayalam cinema with this film, having earlier worked as an editor and director in Bollywood. The then-untitled film was officially announced by lead actor Mohanlal on 3 October 2017. Filming was said to begin soon after he finished his work in Odiyan. When asked, Varma told The Times of India that the film is a "drama-thriller" set in Mumbai, Pune, and Sri Lankan locales, and that principal photography would take place between December 2017 and January 2018. Mohanlal's character and the rest of the cast was not revealed. The film's title was revealed on 27 January 2018 along with a title poster.

Mohanlal was approached for the role right after the scripting was finished. Initially it was announced that south Indian actresses Meena and Trisha Krishnan would be playing the female leads but later the casting was changed. In November 2017, a casting call was released seeking male actors the age groups 50–60 and 30–35, and female actors between the ages of 25 and 30. Varma offered Parvatii Nair a role after he spotted her on the sets of Nimir. She was cast only a few weeks before filming began, and plays an urban character. By the start of filming, only Mohanlal, Parvatii, Suraj Venjaramoodu, Sai Kumar, and Dileesh Pothan were cast. The rest of the cast was filled out as filming progressed. Suraj plays Veerappa, Sunny's chauffeur. Mohanlal and Suraj take up the most screen space in the film. Nadhiya and Nassar were cast in February 2018. Nadhiya and Parvatii play two of the film's important female characters. Nadhiya portrays Sunny's wife Molly Kutty. Megha Mathew confirmed her part in February.

Principal photography began on 9 January 2018 in Mumbai, India, with Santosh Thundiyil serving as director of photography. Director John Matthew Matthan was invited to the first day of filming, and officially performed the switch on of the movie camera. Filming schedules were planned to meet a May 2018 release date (later postponed). Sandeep Narayan and Arun C. Thampi are the executive producers. Parvatii was present on the first day of shooting. Mohanlal joined the set by the fourth week of January. He allotted 15 days dates for filming. Stunt scenes were choreographed by Sunil Rodriguez. Serena Tixeria was the make-up artist. Costumes were designed by Himanshi Nijhawan, while Udai Prakash Singh oversaw the art department. Location filming continued in Mumbai into February in locations including: Bhandup, Powai, and Mira Road. Nadhiya's scenes were shot in early February after her sudden casting that month. Filming was completed in 36 days and wrapped in Mumbai on 15 February 2018.

== Music ==
The film features songs composed by Stephen Devassy; the score was by Ronnie Raphael. Mohanlal sings a duet, written by P. T. Binu, with Shreya Ghoshal. Nieraali, the soundtrack album was released on 5 June 2018 by the label Manorama Music. It consists of seven tracks that runs for 25:23 minutes all together.

Nieraali (Original Motion Picture Soundtrack)
No.	Title	Singer(s)	Length
1.	"Azhake Azhake Aadyamayi"	Mohanlal, Shreya Ghoshal	3:57
2.	"Kannane Kannalane"	M. G. Sreekumar, Syam Prasad, Suraj Venjaramoodu	3:49
3.	"Neeralippidutham"	Vijay Yesudas	3:57
4.	"Azhake Azhake" (Female Version)	Shreya Ghoshal	3:53
5.	"Neerali Reloaded"	Sreeraj Sahajan, Tojan	3:12
6.	"Azhake Azhake" (Male Version)	Mohanlal	3:52
7.	"Kadhanam"	Baburaj Menon	2:43

== Release ==
Neerali originally scheduled to release on 14 June 2018 was moved to 15 June, coinciding with Eid al-Fitr. It was later rescheduled to 12 July 2018 and was again pushed to 13 July.
