= Andha Oru Nimidam =

1985 film by Major Sundarrajan

- Theatrical release poster
- Directed by: Major Sundarrajan
- Written by: Major Sundarrajan; K. Dinakar (dialogues)
- Produced by: Pala. Karuppiah; S. Sampath
- Starring: Kamal Haasan; Urvashi
- Cinematography: T. S. Vinayagam
- Edited by: R. Devarajan
- Music by: Ilaiyaraaja
- Production company: Geethakamalam Movies
- Release date: 31 May 1985
- Country: India
- Language: Tamil

Andha Oru Nimidam (transl. That One Minute) is a 1985 Tamil-language thriller film directed and written by Major Sundarrajan. The film stars Kamal Haasan and Urvashi while Sundarrajan, Jayamalini, Thengai Srinivasan and Pandari Bai play supporting roles. It was released on 31 May 1985.

== Plot ==
Kumar is a lawyer by profession and also actively involved in social work. He falls in love with Vasanthi, a village girl and her grandfather works as housekeeper/car driver in Raj Shekhar's house. One day Raj Shekhar murders his friend/partner Madan and cunningly puts the blame on the grandfather who is arrested and put behind bars. He manages to escape from prison one night to kill Raj Shekhar, but is murdered by Raj Shekhar in front of Kumar and Vasanthi instead. Kumar tries his best to prove in court that Raj Shekar is guilty but loses the case as there is no proper proof of Raj Shekar's guilt. Kumar, with the help of Vasanthi starts investigating and gathering evidence of the murders of Madan and the grandfather. Kumar's family and his lady love, Vasanthi, are put in danger as he tries to prove Raj Shaekar's guilt. How does Kumar catch the culprit Raj Shekhar? What happens to the love of Kumar and Vasanthi? The climax reveals all these answers.

== Cast ==
- Kamal Haasan as Kumar
- Urvashi as Vasanthi
- Major Sundarrajan as Rajasekar
- Y. G. Mahendran as Balu
- Thengai Srinivasan as Seenu
- Jayamalini
- Anuradha
- Pandari Bai as Radha
- Venu Arvind as Inspector Raju
- Saleema as Archana

== Production ==
Sundarrajan, in addition to directing, also played the main antagonist. A day's production schedule was cancelled because of the assassination of Indira Gandhi. The film was launched at Prasad Studios along with song recording.

== Soundtrack ==
The music was composed by Ilaiyaraaja. The songs were composed at a place near Aliyar Dam. The orchestration for "Siriya Paravai" was finished by Ilaiyaraaja in half an hour.

Tamil Track listing
No.	Title	Lyrics	Singer(s)	Length
1.	"Alaigalil Midhakkudhu"	Vairamuthu	S. P. Balasubrahmanyam, S. Janaki	4:27
2.	"Pachondiyye Kelada"	Gangai Amaran	S. P. Balasubrahmanyam	4:28
3.	"Kaathiruppadhu Pathiruppadhu"	Gangai Amaran	S. P. Balasubrahmanyam, Malaysia Vasudevan	4:30
4.	"Siriya Paravai"	Vairamuthu	S. P. Balasubrahmanyam, S. Janaki	5:50
5.	"Thevai Indha Paavai"	Na. Kamarasan	S. P. Balasubrahmanyam, S. P. Sailaja	4:20
6.	"Nalla Neram Neram"	Vairamuthu	S. Janaki	4:04
Total length:				27:39

The movie was dubbed into Telugu as Dongala Vetagadu and lyrics were written by Rajashri

Telugu (dubbed) Track listing
No.	Title	Singer(s)	Length
1.	"Aasalu Palikenu"	S. P. Balasubrahmanyam, S. P. Sailaja	4:27
2.	"Mugisenu New Katha"	S. P. Balasubrahmanyam	4:28
3.	"Baatanepudu Jaarakura"	S. P. Balasubrahmanyam, M. Ramarao	4:30
4.	"Kanulu Palike"	S. P. Balasubrahmanyam, S. P. Sailaja	5:50
5.	"A1 Kanne Pilla"	S. P. Balasubrahmanyam, S. P. Sailaja	4:20
6.	"Naaku Yogam"	S. P. Sailaja	4:04
Total length:			27:39

== Critical reception ==
Balumani of Anna praised the acting of the star cast and Ilaiyaraaja's music, and called it an entertaining film.
