= Anand Sreebala =

2024 Indian film directed by Vishnu Vinay

- Theatrical release poster
- Directed by: Vishnu Vinay
- Written by: Abhilash Pillai
- Produced by: Neeta Pinto; Priya Venu; Venu Kunnapilly
- Starring: Arjun Ashokan; Sangita Madhavan Nair; Aparna Das; Dhyan Sreenivasan; Saiju Kurup
- Cinematography: Vishnu Narayanan
- Edited by: Kiran Das
- Music by: Ranjin Raj
- Production companies: Aan Mega Media; Kavya Film Company
- Distributed by: Kavya Film Company
- Release date: 15 November 2024
- Country: India
- Language: Malayalam

Anand Sreebala is a 2024 Indian Malayalam-language mystery thriller film directed by Vishnu Vinay in his directorial debut, written by Abhilash Pillai and produced by Aan Mega Media and Kavya Film Company.

The film stars Arjun Ashokan in the title role alongside Sangita Madhavan Nair, Aparna Das, Malavika Manoj, Dhyan Sreenivasan, Sshivada, Saiju Kurup, Abin K., Siddique and Krishna in prominent roles. The film was based on true events, and it was released on 15 November 2024 and it received only a mixed response from audiences.

== Plot ==
Anand, a young man haunted by visions of his late mother Sreebala — a respected police constable — dreams of following in her footsteps. Her voice often guides him through his moments of doubt and despair. Though unable to secure a place in the force, Anand takes up a part-time investigator's job at a news agency, where his girlfriend, coincidentally also named Sreebala, works as a journalist.

When she begins investigating the mysterious death of Merin Joy, a college law student whose six-month-old case was dismissed as suicide, Anand becomes deeply involved. As he digs into the inconsistencies, disturbing truths emerge, suggesting a darker conspiracy behind Merin's death.

Driven by his mother's lingering presence and his own thirst for justice, Anand risks everything to expose the truth. But in his pursuit, he must confront a chilling question — will unveiling the real culprit finally bring peace to Merin's parents, or will it destroy the lives of those he loves most?

== Cast ==
- Arjun Ashokan as SCPO Anand Sreebala
  - Sreepath Yaan as young Anand
- Sangita Madhavan Nair as SCPO Sreebala K.S, Anand's mother
- Aparna Das as Sreebala, The Media Reporter and Anand's girlfriend
- Malavika Manoj as Merin Joy
- Sshivada as Commissioner Amala Viswanathan IPS
- Dhyan Sreenivasan as Lalu
- Saiju Kurup as DYSP Shankar Das
- Siddique as Issac
- Kottayam Nazeer as Pradeep
- Aju Varghese as CPO Ayyappan
- Nandu as CI Benny
- Abin Kapoor
- Indrans as Coroner's attender
- Manoj K. U. as Joy, Merin's father
- Krishna as Coroner
- Azees Nedumangad as Antony
- Dr. Bashid Basheer as Rony John
- Jayakrishnan as Anil
- Nandan Unni
- Thushara Pillai as Joy's wife and Merin's mother
- Rini Udayakumar as Grace John, Rony's adopted mother
- Aniyappan as Thondikkuttan
- K. S. Prasad as Edappally Church Vicar
- Murali Krishnan as Merin's local church Vicar
- Sreeja Das as Merin's hostel warden

== Production ==
The film was officially announced on 12 February 2024. The principal photography commenced on 19 February 2024 in Kochi and wrapped up on 20 April 2024. The filming locations including Kochi and Nagercoil.

== Music ==
The music and background score is composed by Ranjin Raj, in his second collaboration with Arjun Ashokan after Wolf (2021) and in his first collaboration with Vishnu Vinay. The first single is a duet sung by Evugin Emmanuel and Suchetha Sathish
