= Megha Mathew =

Indian film actress

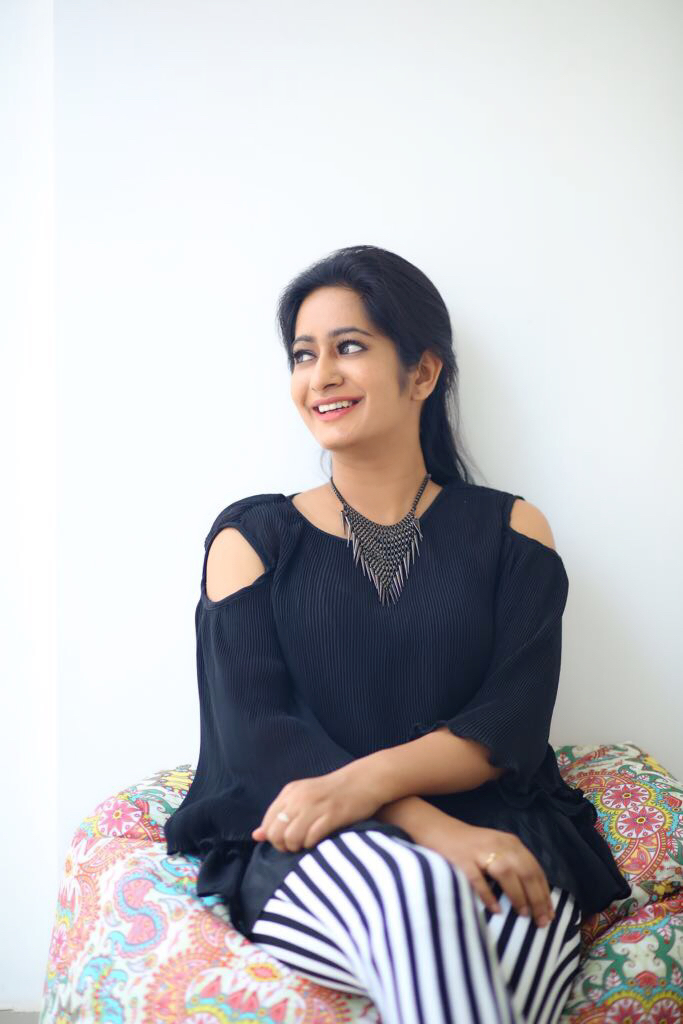
- Born: Kottayam, Kerala, India
- Occupations: Film actress; model

Megha Mathew is an Indian actress who predominantly appears in Malayalam films. She made her debut in 2016 in Aanandam.

== Acting career ==
Mathew started her film career in the film Aanandam (2016). Aanandam is an Indian Malayalam romantic comedy film written and directed by Ganesh Raj in his directorial debut and produced by Vineeth Srinivasan. Subsequently, she was offered parts in Oru Mexican Aparatha also as a college student. Oru Mexican Aparatha is an Indian Malayalam film directed by Tom Emmatty along with Tovino Thomas, Roopesh Peethambaran, Neeraj Madhav.

Mathew's upcoming release is Sidhique Thamarassery's directorial debut Sakhavinte Priyasakhi.

== Filmography ==
Year	Film	Role	Notes
2016	Aanandam	Swetha	Uncredited
2017	Oru Mexican Aparatha	Ardra	
2017	Adam Joan	Niya	
2017	Tiyaan	Indhu	
2017	Masterpiece	Athira	
2018	Sakhavinte Priyasakhi	Lissy	
2018	Haram	Geethu	Musical Album
2018	Mercy Killing	Mercy	Short film
2018	Vikadakumaran	Mini	
2018	Neerali	Lakshmi	
2018	Mandharam	Remya	
2018	Kaly	Andriya	
2018	Neeli	Zareena	
2019	Oru Caribbean Udayippu	Avanthika	
2019	Android Kunjappan Version 5.25	Seetha	
2021	The Creator		
2022	Aviyal	NA	as Executive Producer
