= Anurakthi =

- Directed by: P. K. Ashokan
- Written by: Sanal Machad; Dr S N Mahesh Babu (dialogue)
- Story by: Sanal Machad
- Produced by: P. K. Ashokan; Vijith Nambiar
- Starring: Kalamandalam Sivan Namboodiri, Vani Vashishth, Sreehari Attoor, Vijith Nambiar, Sanju Madhav, Bindu Jayan
- Cinematography: Sasi Ramakrishnan; Anmol
- Edited by: Sunil Kalyani
- Music by: Joy Cheruvathoor; Lyrics-Muraleedharan.P; Singer-Vijith Nambiar
- Production company: Happy Tune Media
- Release date: 2017
- Running time: 83 minutes
- Country: India
- Language: Sanskrit

Anurakthi is a Sanskrit-language film made in Kerala, India. The film is about the Indian traditional performing art Koodiyattom. This is the first Sanskrit film to feature a song. The song was shot in 3D, making the film the first 3D Sanskrit film. The film was screened at the 48th International Film Festival of India (IFFI), Goa in 2017. It won the special jury award for best regional film at the 5th Rajasthan International Film Festival (RIFF), Jaipur in 2018.

== Plot ==
The film revolves around a Punjabi dancer (Vani Vashishth) who arrives in Kerala to learn the ancient dance form Koodiyattam from a master (Kalamandalam Sivan Namboodiri). The master's son falls in love with the dancer, and later mistakes the relationship between his father and the student.

== Cast ==
- Kalamandalam Sivan Namboodiri
- Vani Vashishth
- Sreehari Attoor
- Vijith Nambiar
- Sanju Madhav
- Bindu Jayan
