= Vijith Nambiar =

Indian filmmaker and musician

- വിജിത്‌ നമ്പ്യാർ
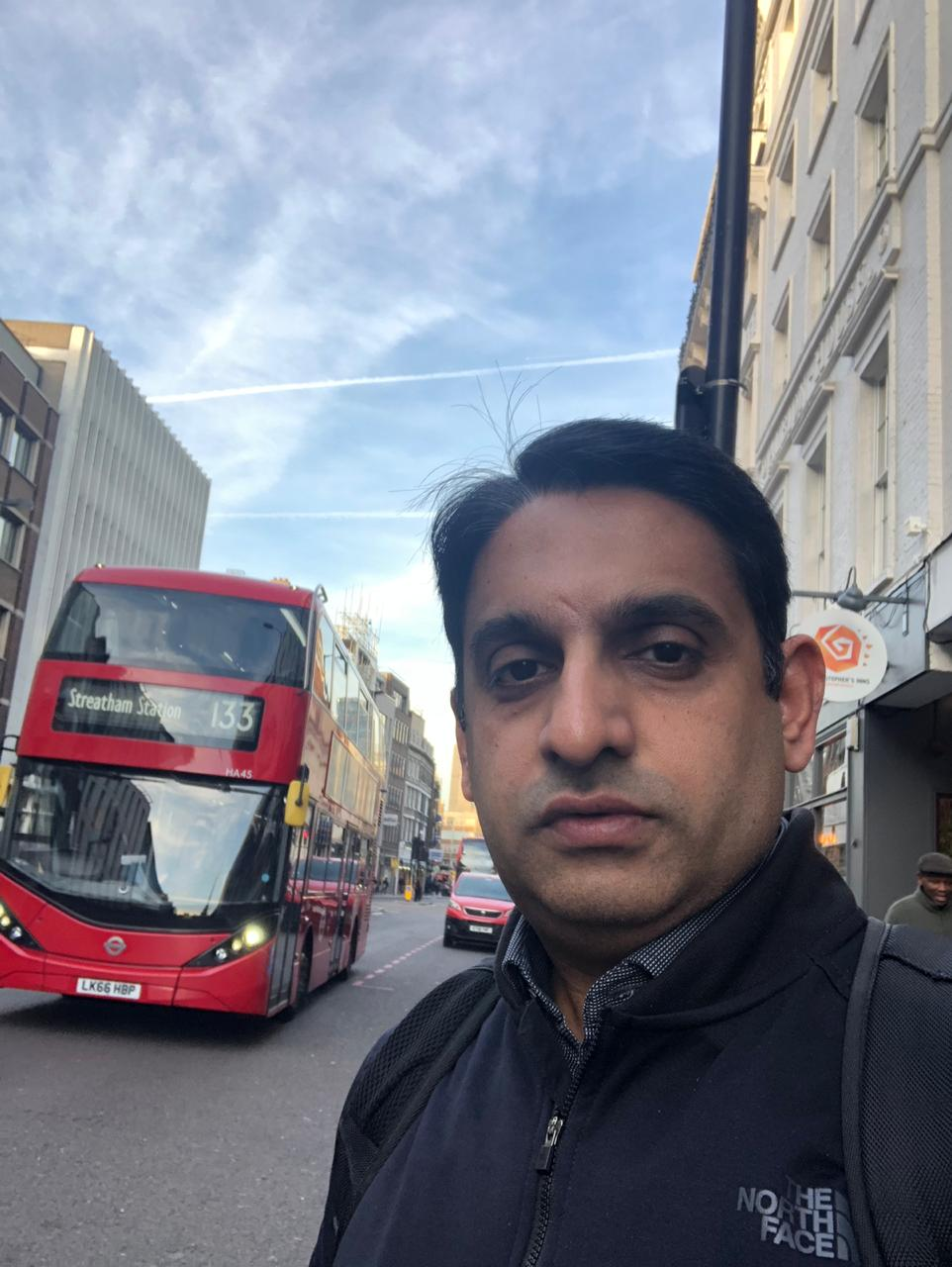
- Born: 9 December 1977 (age 48)
- Occupations: Director, Composer, Actor, Producer
- Years active: 1995–present
- Website: www.vijithnambiar.com

Vijith Nambiar (born 9 December 1977) is an Indian film director, music composer, playback singer, actor and producer, who works in Malayalam cinema and Tamil cinema. He made his film debut in 1995 as an assistant director in the Tamil film industry. As a trained Carnatic singer, he started playback track singing in the Malayalam and Tamil film industries from 1995 onwards for leading musical composers and professional playback singers.

He made his original playback singing debut in 2018 with the song "Thava Chintasu" from Anurakthi, which is world's first 3D Sanskrit movie and the movie was showcased at IFFI. Vijith made his acting debut in Anurakthi (2018). His debut in the Malayalam film industry as director and music director was in 2018 with Munthiri Monchan: Oru Thavala Paranja Kadha, an urban musical romantic comedy, which was released in September 2019.

== Early life and career ==
Vijith Nambiar was born in Cherukunnu, Kannur district, Kerala. He started learning Carnatic music as a child, at the age of seven. Vijith Nambiar studied music under the guidance of musicians BA Chidambaranath Chennai and Kaithapram Vishwanathan Nambudiri.

He graduated in 1999 with a degree in mechanical engineering from the Amrita Vishwa Vidyapeetham in Coimbatore and in 2014 was working as the director of Middle East operations at Dunbar and Boardman Partnership, Ltd.

== Filmography ==
=== Director ===
- Munthiri Monchan: Oru Thavala Paranja Kadha (2019) Malayalam

As Debutant Director Vijith Nambiar's Munthiri Monchan cast includes Manesh Krishnan, Devan, Saleema, Innocent (actor), Salim Kumar, Gopika Anil and crew. Munthiri Monchan is a romantic and a musical film filled with social liveliness. Produced by PK Asokan, written by Manu Gopal and Meharali Poilungal Ismail, Currently the Production company, Vishvas Movies set to release the movie in October 2019

=== Music composer ===
- Munthiri Monchan: Oru Thavala Paranja Kadha (2019) Malayalam

=== Actor ===
- Anurakthi (2017) Sanskrit
- Munthiri Monchan: Oru Thavala Paranja Kadha (2019) Malayalam

== Producer ==
- Anurakthi (2017) Sanskrit

== Playback singer ==
- Anurakthi (2017) Sanskrit

Vijith Nambiar has started singing career has a professional playback track singer from 1995 onwards for leading musical composers and professional playback singers. Vijith made his original playback singing debut in 2018 with the song "Thava Chintasu" from Anurakthi, which is world's first 3D Sanskrit movie and the movie was showcased at IFFI. Vijith Nambiar is the world's first singer to sing a Sanskrit film song in a Sanskrit movie.

== Albums (non films) ==
Azhakil Pozhiyum, Vijith Nambiar singing the song while music given by Kalamandalam Joy Cheruvathoor.

== Awards ==
- 1997: Vijith Nambiar participated in Chembai Sangeetolsavam.
- 2014: He was given an Amrita Alumni award for distinguished contribution to industry.
- 2018: Awarded for best regional feature film Anurakthi in Rajasthan International Film Festival, RIFF 2018
- 2020: Best debut director - Bharat Murali Award.
