= Munthiri Monchan =

- poster
- Directed by: Vijith Nambiar
- Written by: Manu Gopal; Meharali Poilungal Ismail
- Produced by: PK Ashokan; Executive Producer Manosh Mony; CO- Producer; Vineeth Aravind
- Starring: Manesh Krishnan; Gopika Anil; Devan; Saleema; Innocent; Salim Kumar; Cairavee Thakkar; Idavela Babu; Irshad; Anjali Nair; Vishnu Nambiar; Niyaz Backer
- Cinematography: Shan Hafsaali
- Edited by: Anaz Muhammed
- Music by: Vijith Nambiar
- Production company: Vishvas Movies Pvt Ltd
- Distributed by: Movie Factory
- Release date: 6 December 2019
- Running time: 130 minutes
- Country: India
- Language: Malayalam

Munthiri Monchan: Oru Thavala Paranja Kadha is a 2019 Indian cinema Malayalam film directed by debutant director Vijith Nambiar for producer P. K. Ashokan. The film, a Movie Factory presentation stars Manesh Krishnan, Gopika Anil, Salim Kumar, Innocent, Devan and Saleema with several others. The film unites actors Devan and Saleema after a gap of 31 years as the pair's last film was Aranyakam, directed by Hariharan, written by M. T. Vasudevan Nair.

== Summary ==
Munthiri Monchan: Oru Thavala Paranja Kadha revolves around Vivek Viswanath, a young marketing guy working in an advertising firm and his accidental meeting with Ima Rajiv, who runs an online lending library startup. Deepika enters their life as the third person on a train trip to Mumbai. The further incidents in the film give rise to humour, satire, and emotion. Manu Gopal and Meharali Poilungal Ismail have penned the script. The film is a feel-good romantic urban movie and a musical entertainer.

== Cast ==
- Manesh Kumar as Vivek Viswanath
- Gopika Anil as Ima Rajiv
- Devan as Madhavan Kutty
- Saleema as Mary
- Innocent as Menon
- Salim Kumar as Thavala (Frog)
- Cairavee Thakkar as Deepika
- Idavela Babu as Devaraj
- Irshad as Dr. Gautham
- Anjali Nair as Magistrate
- Vishnu Nambiar as Mahesh
- Niyas Backer as Aniyachan
- Meharali Poilungal Ismail as Anwer Shameer
- Amar Ramachandran as Baijuraj
- Kutty Akhil As Sanal

== Production ==
Vijith Nambiar, launched himself as film director with a romantic comedy for producer P. K. Ashokan. The film's two important roles were signed by actors Devan and Saleema, the stars of 1988 release, Aranyakam. Vijith Nambiar also signed actors like Innocent, Salim Kumar, Idavela Babu, Irshad, Vishnu Nambiar, Niyaz Beckar and Bollywood actress Cairavee Thakkar for important roles. The filming was at Kochi, Kozhikode, Nilambur, Theni and Janjheli (Himachal Pradesh) and the entire shooting was completed in January 2019, releasing on 25 October 2019. The cinematography and editing of the film are handled by Shan Hafsali and Anez Muhammed respectively.

== Music ==
The film's music was composed by the director Vijith Nambiar, while Rijosh does the background score. The film has four songs, one of which is a Mehfil. Shankar Mahadevan, K. S. Chithra, Sreya Jayadeep, K. S. Harisankar, Vijesh Gopal and Sudhamayi Nambiar are the playback singers for the lyrics penned by Rafeeq Ahamed, Muralidharan Guruvayur, Manu Gopal and Nishad Ahamed.

The lyric video song "Orkkunnu Njana" from the movie, sung by Shankar Mahadevan, garnered popular acclaim upon its release.

The video song "Pathiye Ithal Vidraum" from the movie, sung by K. S. Chithra and K. S. Harisankar, also garnered popular acclaim upon its release.

No.	Title	Singer(s)	Length
1.	"Orkkunnnu Njana"	Shankar Mahadevan	4:57
2.	"Pathiye Ithal Viriyum"	K. S. Chithra; K. S. Harisankar	5.25
3.	"Ellame Pollappu"	Vijiesh Gopal	4.17
4.	"Moncha Moncha Munthiri Moncha"	Sreya Jayadeep; Sudhamayi Nambiar	3.45
