= Zakariya Mohammed =

Malayalam film director

Zakariya Edayur
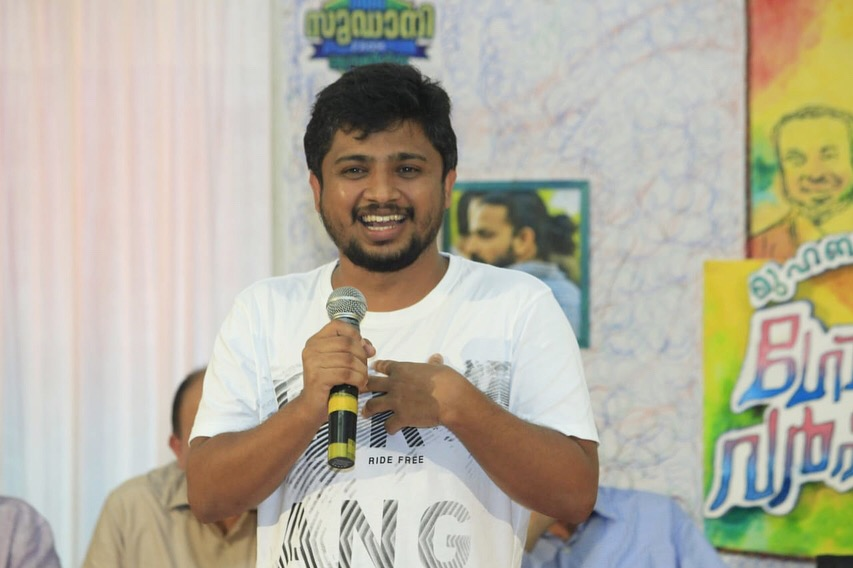
- Zakariya Edayur
- Born: 19 February 1986 (age 40); Valanchery, Kerala, India
- Occupations: Film director, Producer, Actor
- Years active: 2018–present
- Organisation: Cross Border Camera
- Known for: Sudani from Nigeria
- Spouse: Labeeba Mohammed
- Children: 1
- Awards: Kerala State Film Award for Best Screenplay; Kerala State Film Award for Best Debut Director

Zakariya Edayur is an Indian film director, screenwriter, actor and producer who works in Malayalam films. Hailing from Valanchery, Malappuram, Zakariya Edayur is best known for his directorial debut Sudani from Nigeria, which won several awards and accolades. His second directorial feature was Halal Love Story.

== Personal life ==
He is a postgraduate in Mass Communication and Journalism from SAFI Institute of Advanced Study, Vazhayur. and worked as an assistant professor in MediaOne Academy at Kozhikode. He started his career as an Assistant Director in an Advertising production house, TVC Factory, Kochi, Kerala.

== Filmography ==
Year	Title	Director	Writer	Producer	Notes
2018	Sudani from Nigeria	Yes	Yes	No	Debut movie as director
2020	Halal Love Story	Yes	Yes	Yes	
2023	Ayisha	No	No	Yes	
2023	Momo in Dubai	No	Yes	Yes	
2023	Jackson Bazaar Youth	No	No	Yes	

=== Acting roles ===
Year	Title	Role	Notes
2019	Virus	Zakariya	
2019	Thamaasha	Himself	Brief Cameo
2025	Communist Pacha Adhava Appa	Wahid	

== Awards ==
Year	Film	Award	Category
2018	Sudani from Nigeria	Kerala State Film Awards	Best Film with Popular Appeal and Aesthetic Value
2018	Sudani from Nigeria	Kerala State Film Awards	Best Screenplay
2018	Sudani from Nigeria	Kerala State Film Awards	Best Debut Director
2018	Sudani from Nigeria	23rd International Film Festival of Kerala	FIPRESCI Award: Best Malayalam Film
2018	Sudani from Nigeria	66th National Film Awards	Best Feature Film in Malayalam
2018	Sudani from Nigeria	Aravindan Puraskaram	Best Debut Director
2018	Sudani from Nigeria	Mohan Ragavan Award	Best Director
2018	Sudani from Nigeria	Padmarajan Award	Best Director
2018	Sudani from Nigeria	Movie Street Film Awards	Best Film
2018	Sudani from Nigeria	Movie Street Film Awards	Best Director
2018	Sudani from Nigeria	Asianet Film Awards	Best Film
2018	Sudani from Nigeria	Indywood Academy Awards 2018	Best Screenplay - Original
2018	Sudani from Nigeria	SIIMA	Best Debut director
2018	Sudani from Nigeria	CPC Cine Awards	Best Screenplay
2018	Sudani from Nigeria	CPC Cine Awards	Best Film
2018	Sudani from Nigeria	MACTA Sadananda Puraskaram	Best Debut Director
2018	Sudani from Nigeria	Vanitha Film Awards	Best Debut Director
