= The Gambinos =

2019 Indian film

- Directed by: Girish Panicker Mattada
- Written by: Sakkir Madathil
- Based on: Animal Kingdom
- Produced by: P. M Sasidharan, Biju Nandakumar, Advaith manholi
- Starring: Vishnu Vijay; Radhika Sarathkumar; Sampath Raj; Sijoy Varghese
- Cinematography: Elban Krishna
- Edited by: Shafique Mohamed Ali
- Music by: Jakes Bejoy
- Release date: 8 March 2019
- Country: India
- Language: Malayalam

The Gambinos is a 2019 Indian Malayalam-language film directed by Girish Panicker Mattada. The film stars Vishnu Vijay, Radhika Sarathkumar, Sampath Raj and Sijoy Varghese. The film revolves around a mother and her four sons, leading their criminal lives, until the arrival of a young man called Mustafa, who brings unexpected twists and turns to the tale.

== Cast ==
- Vishnu Vinay as Mustafa
- Radhika Sarathkumar as Mariamma a.k.a. Mamma
- Sampath Raj as Jose
- Sijoy Varghese as Crime Branch Officer
- Sreejith Ravi as Aby
- Muhammad Musthafa as Alex

== Soundtrack ==
The soundtrack was composed by Jakes Bejoy.

#	Title	Lyricist	Performer(s)
1	Labella	B. K. Harinarayanan	Abhay Jodhpurkar

== Production ==
Radhika Sarathkumar plays a don in the film.

== Reception ==
A critic from The Times of India wrote that "The uncertainty in the mind of the filmmaker shows in the film as well in terms of how certain characters and scenes are crafted". A critic from The New Indian Express wrote that "Radhika and Sampath are talented actors no doubt, but except for a few moments which convey their characters’ true colours, they’re terribly miscast here".
