= Aranyakam =

- Theatrical Release poster
- Directed by: Hariharan
- Written by: M. T. Vasudevan Nair
- Produced by: B. Shashi Kumar
- Starring: Saleema; Devan; Vineeth; Nedumudi Venu; Jagannatha Varma; Parvathy Jayaram; Bahadoor; Sukumari
- Cinematography: Venu
- Edited by: M. S. Mani
- Music by: Raghunath Seth
- Production company: Mudra Films
- Distributed by: Mudra Release
- Release date: 8 December 1988
- Country: India
- Language: Malayalam

Aranyakam (Malayalam:ആരണ്യകം, English:Forest) is a 1988 Malayalam film, directed by Hariharan, written by M. T. Vasudevan Nair, and starring Saleema, Devan, and Vineeth. The film was produced by B. Sasikumar. The music was composed by Raghunath Seth, with lyrics by O. N. V. Kurup and vocals by K. J. Yesudas and K. S. Chitra. It is about a teenage girl named Ammini who likes to visit forests and has a hobby of writing imaginary letters to famous people. Actress Saleema memorably portrays Ammini. She remains one of the few quirky female characters in Malayalam cinema to date.

== Synopsis ==
The film handles the issue of exploitation of Adivasis by feudal lords, and that of Naxalism which attempts to resist and counter this, and of how the feudal lords use the "system" to suppress the resistance. The film speaks through the eyes of protagonist Ammini, a 16-year-old girl whose life takes a turn when Devan, who is a stranger and Mohan, who has a romantic interest in her, inspires her and believes in her brilliance unlike everyone else, enter her life. Ammini starts loving Mohan back. Devan turns out to be a Naxalite conspiring to kill her uncle, a feudal lord, who has been exploiting the tribal community in the area for his own personal interests. But Devan accidentally kills Mohan instead of her uncle. The police kill Devan as a result.

== Cast ==
- Saleema as Ammini
- Devan as a stranger / naxal activist
- Vineeth as Mohan
- Nedumudi Venu as a feudal lord
- Jagannatha Varma as Madhavan Nair
- Parvathy Jayaram as Shailaja
- Balan K. Nair as Ravunni, a police officer
- Bahadoor as Nanu
- Prathapachandran as Nambiar
- Captain Raju as a police officer
- Sukumari as Madhavan Nair's wife
- Valsala Menon as Nambiar's wife
- Deepthi Kurupp as Shailaja's sister

== Soundtrack ==
All lyrics are written by O. N. V. Kurup; all music is composed by Raghunath Seth.

No.	Title	Artist(s)	Length
1.	"Athmaavil Muttivilichathu"	K. J. Yesudas
2.	"Olichirikkaan Vallikkudilonnorukki"	K. S. Chithra
3.	"Thaarakale"	K. S. Chithra
4.	"Thanichirikkaan Ivide Enikkkoru" (Slow)	K. S. Chithra
