= Oru Caribbean Udayippu =

Malayalam film

- Directed by: A.Joji
- Produced by: RVK Nair
- Starring: Samuel Robinson; Rishi Prakash; Vishnu Vinay; Aneesh G Menon; Megha Mathew; Mareena Michal; Niharika; Vishnu Govindan
- Cinematography: Venugopal
- Edited by: Sandeep Nandhakumar
- Music by: Charu Hariharan
- Release date: 11 January 2019
- Running time: 131 minutes
- Country: India
- Language: Malayalam

Oru Caribbean Udayippu (translation: A Caribbean con) is 2019 Indian Malayalam drama film directed by A.Joji starring Samuel Robinson, Rishi Prakash, Vishnu Vinay, Aneesh G Menon, Megha Mathew, Mareena Michal, Niharika and Vishnu Govindan. The movie is about rivalry between two musical bands in a college.

== Plot ==
The movie tells the story of 6 music enthusiastic youths from a village forms a music band in college. They develops a rivalry between other music band which is formed by their seniors.

== Cast ==
- Samuel Robinson as Samuel (Tik Tak)
- Rishi Prakash as Kevin
- Vishnu Vinay
- Aneesh G Menon
- Megha Mathew as Avanthika
- Mareena Michael as Meenakshi
- Niharika
- Vishnu Govindan as Benson
- Kochu Preman
- Jassie Gift
