= Aakasha Ganga 2 =

2019 film directed by Vinayan

- Theatrical release poster
- Directed by: Vinayan
- Written by: Vinayan
- Produced by: Vinayan
- Starring: Veena P Nair
- Cinematography: Prakash Kutty
- Edited by: Abhilash Viswanad
- Music by: Bijibal
- Production company: Akash Films
- Release date: 1 November 2019 (India)
- Running time: 140 minutes
- Country: India
- Language: Malayalam

Aakasha Ganga 2 (transl. Milky Way 2) is 2019 Indian Malayalam-language supernatural horror comedy film written and directed by Vinayan. It is a sequel to his 1999 film Aakasha Ganga. The film stars Ramya Krishna, Veena Nair, Vishnu Vinay, and Sreenath Bhasi in the lead roles. Its soundtrack and score are by Bijibal and cinematography by Prakash Kutty. The film was produced by Vinayan under the banner of Akash Films. In the film, years later, when Arathi, daughter of Maya (Daisy) and Unni, accepts the challenge of exposing an ashram, which claims to help its followers communicate with the dead, she gets haunted by an evil spirit of Ganga that once tormented her family.

It was shot in Ottapalam, Cochin, and Pondicherry.

== Plot ==
Twenty years after the incident at the Maanikaseri Kovilakam, several members of the family have now died, leaving behind Unnikrishnan Varma/Unni, his sister (Oppol), and his only daughter Arathi Varma. An atheist and rationalist, Arathi is a medical student who hangs around with her close friends, Jithu, Titus, and Gopi, who is also her lover. One day, the friends come across an ashram that is headed by Soumini Devi, a tantrik ritualist who specialises in dark spells and black magic. Arathi decides to test the authenticity of the claims of the ashram. Hence, she is allowed to make contact with the soul of her deceased mother, Maya/Daisy, who died after childbirth. The soul tells her about a bracelet she intended to give her newborn daughter, made by her great-grandmother after Arathi was born.

Out of curiosity, Arathi searches for the bracelet, which leads to a forbidden temple that contains the evil soul of Ganga, the maid who was killed mercilessly by the male members of the Maanikaseri family decades ago. Arathi accidentally releases the soul, leading to several paranormal incidents in the house. Frightened, the four friends decide to meet Meppadan Thirumeni, the exorcist who subdued the evil spirit previously, at his house but find out that he has died too. Eventually, they contact Soumini Devi, the estranged daughter of Meppadan, about the strange problems. Soumini Devi says that it was the spirit of Ganga that was causing the current problems. She also tells them that after the spirit was exorcised from Arathi's mother's body, several members of the family died after Arathi's birth due to this spirit. So Meppadan used his tantric powers to imprison the evil soul, this time inside the family's temple, and told the family members to not open its doors. The spirit was now targeting Arathi, intending to kill her on the new moon night of 31 July. Before that time, the spirit must be subdued.

However, the spirit causes more trouble and eventually possesses Arathi. After this, Unni gets killed by the soul, thereby avenging the actions caused by his ancestors leading to Ganga's death. Soon, an exorcism is arranged by Soumini Devi along with the help of Ananthan Thirumeni, the disciple of Meppadan. They successfully remove the spirit from Arathi's body, with Thirumeni promising her that the spirit would never come near her again. While Arathi and her friends leave home, Soumini Devi is attacked and killed by the spirit. The fate of the spirit as well as the family members affected by it, to this day remains unknown.

== Cast ==
- Mayoori as Ganga/Spirit (Recreated version)
- Veena P Nair as Arathi Varma
- Ramya Krishna as Soumini Devi
- Sreenath Bhasi as Titus
- Vishnu Vinay as Goutham Varma
- Vishnu Govindan as Jithu
- Riyaz as Unnikrishna Varma Thampuran
- Senthil Krishna as SI T.Balaraman
- Salim Kumar as Joseph/ Anatomy Professor
- Hareesh Kanaran as Dr.Damu (Medical College Principal)
- Dharmajan Bolgatty as Bharathan
- Hareesh Peradi as Ananthan Thirumeni
- Sunil Sukhada as Swami Chinmayi
- Saju Kodiyan as Anil, Bus Driver
- Praveena as Oppol
- Thesni Khan as Sundari Bharathan's wife
- Valsala Menon as Kausalya Antharjanam
- Saranya Anand(Dual role) as
  - Burnt Ganga (spirit)
  - Collage teacher
- Kanakalatha – Daisy's mother
- Idavela Babu - Unni's friend, Ravi

=== Photo Archive ===
- Kalpana as Aaveshananda Swamigal
- Rajan P Dev as Meppadan Thirumeni
- Divya Unni as Maya/Daisy
- Jagadish as Krishnan Thampuran
- Innocent as Ramavarma Thampuran
- Sukumari as Maanikkasseri Thampuratti
- Spadikam George as Maanikkasseri Thampuran

== Production ==
=== Development ===
Vinayan announced Aakasha Ganga 2 on his Facebook page on 4 March 2019. Vinayan himself launched the title poster. On 4 March 2019, The Times of India had reported that Vinayan divulges about Aakasha Ganga sequel. The film was produced by Vinayan under the banner of Aakash Films.

=== Filming ===
The filming started in Palakkad on 24 April 2019. Cinematographer Prakash Kutty, music composers Bijibal, and lyricists Hari Narayanan and Rameshan Nair joined the crew initially. Ramya Krishnan was confirmed as the central character for the film. Other primary filming locations were Kannur and Palani, Tamil Nadu.

== Soundtrack ==
Bijibal composed the film's music and Berny-Ignatius remade the song "Puthumazhayayi vannu ne" from the first part. The lyrics were written by Harinarayanan and Rameshan Nair.

Track listing
No.	Title	Lyrics	Music	Singer	Length
1.	"Puthu Mazhayayi Vannoo Nee..."	S. Ramesan Nair	Berny–Ignatius	K. S. Chithra	3:06
