= Subharathri =

2019 Indian Malayalam-language family drama film

- Directed by: Vyasan K. P.
- Written by: Vyasan K. P.
- Produced by: Abraham Mathew
- Starring: Siddique; Dileep; Anu Sithara; Shanthi Krishna; Asha Sharath; Nadirsha; Vijay Babu
- Cinematography: Alby Antony
- Edited by: H. K. Harshan
- Music by: Bijibal
- Production company: Abaam Movies
- Distributed by: Abaam Film Release
- Release date: 6 July 2019 (India)
- Running time: 155 minutes
- Country: India
- Language: Malayalam

Subharathri (transl. Goodnight) is a 2019 Indian Malayalam-language family drama film written and directed by Vyasan K. P. The film, based on true events, follows Mohammad who set out for his first Hajj pilgrimage. It stars Siddique, Dileep, Anu Sithara, Shanthi Krishna, Asha Sharath and Aju Varghese. The film was released in India on 6 July 2019.

== Plot ==
Muhammed is a sincere and generous man. Having lost his father at a young age, it becomes his responsibility to look after his younger sisters and mother.Later, Though he couldn't succeed in his love life, he is a happily married elderly man whose major goal is to go for Hajj. (According to Islam, Hajj is one of the five pillars and all Muslims who fulfill 'certain' conditions must perform Hajj at least once in their lifetime. And the certain conditions includes spiritual fitness and being emotionally happy.) For this he makes sure to reconcile with his brother, get reacquainted with people he know, seek forgiveness from his childhood friend and even meets up with long lost love. Muhammed meets all these conditions and is jovial enough for the trip until the fateful night, when he encounters the stranger in his house, Krishnan.

The 2nd half of the movie moves with Krishnan and his love interest Sreeja. They are married and has a daughter. As he was leading a happy life anincident (robbery) which happened in the past boomerangs back into his life. He is caught by the police and discovers that his old friends who were his alliance in the old crime got caught in a bigger robbery. After being released as he comes back home who is feeling betrayed which lead to an argument and she leaves home.

Though the 1st half looks bit lengthy but the way how it is being handled to show case the importance of Muhammad trying to reconcile with all his relatives and friends (even with his class 7 friend Indrans are classic moments).

Muhammad meets Suhara his youth time lover after 30+ years. His entire family now receive Suhara with lots of love and affection. Also the love, loss and reunion between Muhammad and Suhara comes to an end in a beautiful note.

The movie ends with beautiful message.

== Cast ==
- Siddique as Mohammed
- Dileep as Krishnan
- Anu Sithara as Sreeja
- Shanthi Krishna as Khadeeja
- Asha Sarath as Suhara
- Sheelu Abraham as Dr. Sheela
- Nadirshah as Shanavas
- Aju Varghese as George
- K. P. A. C. Lalitha as Mother superior
- Nedumudi Venu as Majeed
- Suraj Venjaramoodu as Adv. Harikumar
- Indrans as A. C. Suresh
- Sai Kumar as Ummer
- Hareesh Peradi as CI Hari
- Swasika as Sulnama
- Jayan Cherthala as Jayapalan
- Thesni Khan as Sainaba
- Ashokan as SI Ashok
- Sudhi Koppa as Raju, Krishnan' Child Hood friend
- Sreejit Sudhakaran as Riyas, Krishnan' Child hood friend
- Manikandan R. Achari as Charli, Krishnan's child hood friend
- Vijay Babu as CI Balachandran
- Majeed as Thomachan
- Nandu Poduval as Narayanan
- Shobha Mohan as Jameela
- Prashanth Alexander as Salam
- Rekha Ratheesh as Sreeja's mother
- Archana Menon as Nabeesu

== Production ==
The film is based on a true incident that occurred in Clappana in Kollam district. Filming began in March 2019 in Ernakulam. It was completed in early May 2019. Subharathri is the second directorial of Vyasan K. P. after Ayal Jeevichirippundu (2017).

== Release ==
The film was released in Indian on 6 July 2019.

=== Critical reception ===
The Times of India rated 3.5 stars out of 5 and wrote that the film "narrates a simple tale, which can't claim to offer anything path-breaking. However, this is a movie that still manages to move the audience, in an age-old yet feel-good fashion, which will appeal to the family audience, the best". Sify rated it 3 in scale of 5 and wrote that it is "A feel good film, narrated in a rather conventional but honest manner". Rating 3 out of 5, Malayala Manorama wrote that "Shubharathri is a simple tale of a man and an honest approach made with lots of goodness". Gulf News wrote that "'Shubarathri' connects well with its simplicity and a social message that needs to be heard". Deccan Chronicle called it a "thrilling family drama" and said that "Though Shubharathri doesn't have anything path-breaking to narrate, it will please family audience" and rated 2.5 out of 5 stars.
