= Anu Sithara =

Indian actress, dancer (born 1995)

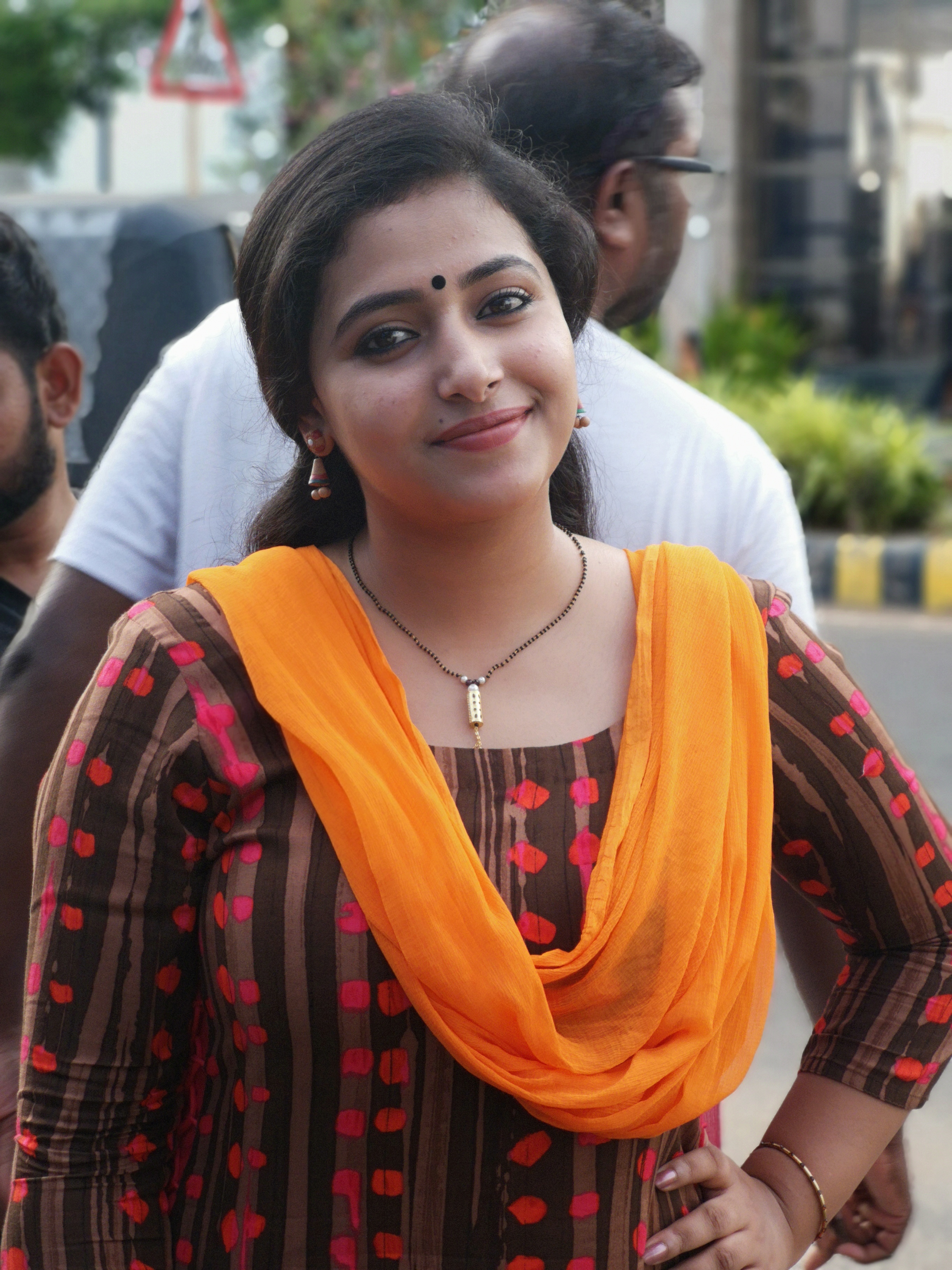
- Anu sithara at shubharathri movie shooting spot
- Born: Anu Sithara Salam; 21 August 1995 (age 31); Wayanad, Kerala, India
- Occupations: Actress; dancer
- Years active: 2013–present
- Spouse: Vishnu Prasad (m. 2015)
- Parents: Abdul Salam (Father); Renuka (Mother)

Anu Sithara (born August 21, 1995) is an Indian actress who appears predominantly in Malayalam films. She has also appeared in some Tamil films. She made her debut in 2013 as a child artist Pottas Bomb in 2013. Anu is also a trained Bharatanatyam dancer and well known for her stage shows.

== Personal life ==
Anu was born on 21 August 1995 to Renuka and Abdul Salam. She has one sibling, Anu Sonora. Sithara did her schooling at SKMJ Higher Secondary School in Kalpetta and later graduated from WMO Arts and Science College with a degree in B.Com. She was always active in her dancing classes and has won many prizes henceforth. She learned classical dance from Kerala Kalamandalam. She married her boyfriend Vishnu Prasad in 2015.

== Career ==
=== Early career (2013–2016) ===
Sithara stepped into acting in 2013. She made her debut in Malayalam Cinema with the movie Pottas Bomb. Later, she played a minor role in the super-hit film Oru Indian Pranayakadha. In 2015, she appeared in a cameo role in Sachy's film Anarkali as Athira. Since then she has acted the movies such as Happy Wedding, Campus Diary, and Marupadi.

=== Breakthrough and recognition (2017–present) ===
In 2017, she played a lead role with Kunchacko Boban in the film Ramante Edanthottam. The film was directed by Ranjith Shankar. The film was successful and received positive reviews from audiences and critics alike. Later she acted in films such as Achayans, Sarvopari Palakkaran, and Aana Alaralodalaral. She then appeared in the film Captain, and received appreciation for her role. She then acted with Tovino Thomas in the film Oru Kuprasidha Payyan and she won the Filmfare Award for Best Actress – Malayalam in 2019. Apart from acting in Malayalam, Anu made her first debut in Tamil Cinema with the film Podhu Nalan Karudhi in 2018, She played the female lead role opposite Karunakaran in the film.

In 2019, she shared screen space with Dileep in the film Subharathri as Sreeja Krishnan. It was directed and written by Vyasan K.P. Later, she appeared in an action-drama Mamangam directed by M. Padmakumar. Mammookka, Unni Mukundan, and Siddique. After playing a cameo appearance in the film Maniyarayile Ashokan as Unnimaya (cameo) in 2020, Anu was last seen in the film 12th Man as Merin. It was a thriller movie directed by Jeethu Joseph and starred Mohanlal in the lead role.

She also acted in the first Graphic novel style Newspaper movie Locked Inn, published by Malayala Manorama in 2020.

== Filmography ==
Key
†	Denotes films that have not yet been released

- All films in Malayalam unless otherwise indicated

List of Anu Sithara film credits
Year	Film	Role	Notes	Ref.
2013	Pottas Bomb	Aswathy	Debut film	
2013	Oru Indian Pranayakadha	Young Thulasi		
2015	Anarkali	Athira	Cameo appearance	
2016	Happy Wedding	Shahina		
2016	Campus Diary	Kaashi Thumba		
2016	Marupadi	Riya		
2017	Fukri	Alia Ali Fukri		
2017	Ramante Edanthottam	Malini		
2017	Achayans	Prayaga		
2017	Sarvopari Palakkaran	Linta Jose		
2017	Naval Enna Jewel	Asma		
2017	Aana Alaralodalaral	Parvathy		
2018	Captain	Anitha Sathyan		
2018	Padayottam	Meera Teacher		
2018	Oru Kuttanadan Blog	Hema Rahul Bhanuprasad		
2018	Johny Johny Yes Appa	Jaisa		
2018	Oru Kuprasidha Payyan	Jalaja		
2019	Neeyum Njanum	Hashmi Anzari		
2019	Podhu Nalan Karudhi	Mridula	Tamil film	
2019	And the Oscar Goes To...	Chitra		
2019	Subharathri	Sreeja Krishnan		
2019	Adhyarathri	Anitha Mullakkara	Cameo appearance	
2019	Mamangam	Manikyam Chandroth Panicker		
2020	Maniyarayile Ashokan	Unnimaya	Cameo appearance	
2021	Vanam	Malli	Tamil film	
2022	12th Man	Merin Sam		
2023	Momo in Dubai	Khadeeja Muhammed		
2023	Santhosham	Aadhya Suresh Kumar		
2023	Pathu Thala	Samudra Arunmozhi	Tamil film	
2023	Vaathil	Thani		
2024	Aalan	Thamarai	Tamil film	
2024	Jananam 1947: Pranayam Thudarunnu	Angel		
2026	Hail Mary †	TBA		

== Television ==
Year	Title	Role	Channel	Notes	Ref.
2015	Bug	Vani	YouTube	Short film	
2016	Ninachirikkathe	Ayisha	YouTube	Short film	
2017	Lifinu Venam Plus	Anchor	Asianet Plus	Comedy show	
2017	Yuva Film Awards	Dancer	Asianet	Award show	
2017	Mazhavil Mango Music Awards	Dancer	Mazhavil Manorama	Award show	
2017	D4 Dance Junior v/s Senior	Judge	Mazhavil Manorama	Reality show	
2017	Onnum Onnum Moonu	Guest	Mazhavil Manorama	Reality show	
2017	Annies Kitchen	Guest	Amrita TV	Cooking show	
2018	Thakarppan Comedy	Judge	Mazhavil Manorama		
2018	Comedy Utsavam	Judge	Flowers TV	Talent Show	
2018	Nadanam Venulaayam	Dancer	Surya TV	Award show	
2018	Red FM Malayalam Music Awards	Dancer	Mazhavil Manorama	Award show	
2019	Badai Bungalow	Guest	Asianet	Talk show	
2019	Vanitha Film Awards	Dancer	Surya TV	Award show	
2020	Box	Producer	YouTube	Web series as Producer	
2020	Red Carpet	Mentor	Amrita TV	Reality show	
2020	Super 4 Season 2	Guest	Mazhavil Manorama	Reality show	
2020	Top Singer (TV series)	Guest	Flowers TV	Reality show	
2021	Parayam Nedam	Participant	Amrita TV		
2021	Welcome 2021	Dancer	Kairali TV		
2021	Atham Pathu Ruchi	Host	Mazhavil Manorama	Cooking show	
2021	Bigg Boss (Malayalam season 3)	Dancer	Asianet	Reality television	
2021	Sa Re Ga Ma Pa Keralam	Guest	Zee Keralam	Reality television	
2022	Start Music Aaradhyam Padum Season 4	Guest	Asianet		
2022	Atham Pathu Ruchi	Promo Host	Mazhavil Manorama	Cooking show	
2022	Flowers Oru Kodi	Participant	Flowers TV		
2023	Dancing Stars	Judge	Asianet		
2023	Funs upon a time season 3	Judge	Amrita TV	Comedy show	
2026-present	Dance Dhamaka	Judge	Flowers TV		

== Awards and nominations ==
Anu Sithara awards and nominations
Awards and nominations
Award	Wins	Nominations

Totals (Note: Certain award groups do not simply award one winner. They acknowledge several different recipients, have runners-up, and have third place. Since this is a specific recognition and is different from losing an award, runner-up mentions are considered wins in this award tally. For simplification and to avoid errors, each award in this list has been presumed to have had a prior nomination.)
- Wins: 3
- Nominations: 12

Year	Award	Category	Film	Result	Ref.
2017	Asiavision Awards	New Sensation in Acting (Female)	Ramante Edanthottam	Won	
2017	Asianet Film Awards	Best Actress	Ramante Edanthottam	Nominated	
2017	SIIMA for Best Actress – Malayalam	Best Actress	Ramante Edanthottam	Nominated	
2017	Filmfare Award for Best Actress – Malayalam	Best Actress	Ramante Edanthottam	Nominated	
2018	Asianet Film Awards	Best Actress	Ramante Edanthottam	Nominated	
2018	Vanitha Film Awards	Special Performance (Actress)	Ramante Edanthottam	Won	
2018	Filmfare Award for Best Actress – Malayalam	Best Actress	Ramante Edanthottam	Nominated	
2018	65th Filmfare Awards South	Best Actress	Ramante Edanthottam	Nominated	
2018	7th South Indian International Movie Awards	Best Actress	Ramante Edanthottam	Nominated	
2019	Asianet Film Awards	Best Actress	Oru Kuprasidha Payyan	Won	
2019	21st Asianet Film Awards	Best Actress	Ramante Edanthottam	Nominated	
2019	66th Filmfare Awards South	Best Actress	Captain	Nominated	
2019	8th South Indian International Movie Awards	Best Actress	Captain	Nominated	
2019	SIIMA for Best Actress – Malayalam	Best Actress in a Leading Role	Captain	Nominated	
2019	Filmfare Award for Best Actress – Malayalam	Best Actress	Captain	Nominated	
