= Aneesh G. Menon =

Indian Malayalam actor

- Born: 20 May 1985 (age 41); Valanchery, Malappuram, Kerala, India
- Occupation: Actor
- Years active: 2010–present
- Spouse: Aishwarya Rajan

Aneesh G. Menon is an Indian actor who predominantly acts in Malayalam films. He has acted in films such as Drishyam, Odiyan, Njan Prakashan, Driving License, Kayamkulam Kochunni and Momo in Dubai.

== Personal life ==
Aneesh married Aishwarya Rajan on 18 January 2019. The couple have a boy named Aryan Aneesh. He began his career at the Kerala People's Arts Club as an artist and performed on more than 100 stages in India.

== Filmography ==
Key
†	Denotes films that have not yet been released

=== Films ===
Year	Title	Role	Notes	Ref.
2010	Apoorvaragam			
2010	Oru Nunakadha			
2010	Best Actor	Binosh		
2012	Gramam	Kuttan		
2013	Arikil Oraal			
2013	Thee Kulikkum Pachai Maram	Vaalie	Tamil film	
2013	Memories	Vijay		
2013	Drishyam	Rajesh		
2014	Manglish	Simon		
2014	Balyakalasakhi	Kurissu Thoma		
2014	Peruchazhi	Youth Secretary Rahul Chakkappan		
2014	Tamaar Padaar			
2014	Angels	Rishi		
2014	Namma Gramam	Pottan Kuttan	Tamil film	
2015	KL 10 Patthu	Yousaf		
2016	Valliyum Thetti Pulliyum Thetti	Keerikkadan Jose		
2016	Amoeba			
2017	Cappuccino	Jeevan		
2017	The Great Father	Asif		
2018	Kallai FM	Aju		
2018	Khaleefa	Muneer		
2018	Queen	Manoj		
2018	Sudani from Nigeria	Nizar		
2018	Karalmax Bakthanaanu	College Teacher		
2018	Pappu	Ramesh		
2018	Kottayam	Johnny		
2018	Purple	Abhi		
2018	Kayamkulam Kochunni	Noorahmad		
2018	Odiyan	Unnikrishnan		
2018	Njan Prakashan	Bahuleyan		
2019	Oru Adaar Love	Shibu Sunny		
2019	Lucifer	Sumesh		
2019	Driving Licence	Zaheer		
2019	Oru Caribbean Udayippu			
2021	Drishyam 2	Rajesh	Released on Amazon Prime	
2021	Yuvam	Sushanth Nair IAS		
2022	Randu	Habeeb		
2022	Kaduva	Sunny		
2023	Momo In Dubai	Habeeb		
2023	Sesham Mike-il Fathima	Asif		
2023	Binary			
2025	Empuraan	Sumesh		
2025	Ambalamukkile Visheshangal †	TBA		

=== Television ===
Year	Title	Role	Notes
2011-2013	My Name Is Mangamma	Krishna	Tamil serial
