= Vishnu Vinay =

Indian actor (born 1987)

- Born: 8 April 1987 (age 39); Kochi, Ernakulam, Kerala, India
- Occupations: Actor; Film director; Scriptwriter
- Years active: 2017–present
- Spouse: Dr. Vidhu Sreedharan (m. 2019)
- Parent(s): Vinayan; Neena

Vishnu Vinay (born 8 April 1987) is an Indian actor who appears predominantly in Malayalam films. He is the son of Malayalam film director Vinayan. Vishnu made his debut in Malayalam through the film History of Joy (2017) directed by Vishnu Govindan. Vishnu has also written the story for Hareendran Oru Nishkalankan (2007), which was directed by his father.

== Early life ==
Vishnu lives in Palarivattom, Ernakulam. He did schooling from Rajagiri, Kalamasserry and later Chinmaya Vidyalaya, Kochi. He then graduated with a Bachelor of Science in Aerospace Engineering from Virginia Tech, US and later pursued masters in Aeronautics from Purdue University, US.

His father Vinayan is a veteran filmmaker from the Malayalam film industry and his mother Neena is a homemaker. He has a younger sister Nikhila who is married and settled in the United States. Vishnu started his career in the film industry in 2007 when he wrote the story for Hareendran Oru Nishkalankan which was turned into a film by his father. Vishnu is a trained percussionist and also has a keen interest in singing. On 19 January 2019, he married Dr. Vidhu Sreedharan, a dentist.

== Filmography ==
Key
†	Denotes films that have not yet been released

- All films are in Malayalam language unless otherwise noted.

=== As actor ===
Year	Film	Role	Notes	Ref.
2017	History of Joy	Joy	Debut Film	
2019	Oru Caribbean Udayippu			
2019	The Gambinos	Musthafa		
2019	Aakasha Ganga 2	Gopikrishnan		
2022	Pathonpatham Noottandu	Inspector Kannan Kurup		

=== As writer/director ===
Year	Title	Credited as		Notes	Ref.
Year	Title	Director	Writer	Notes	Ref.
2007	Hareendran Oru Nishkalankan	No	Yes	Directed by Vinayan	
2024	Anand Sreebala	Yes	No	Written by Abhilash Pillai	
