= Saleema =

Indian actress

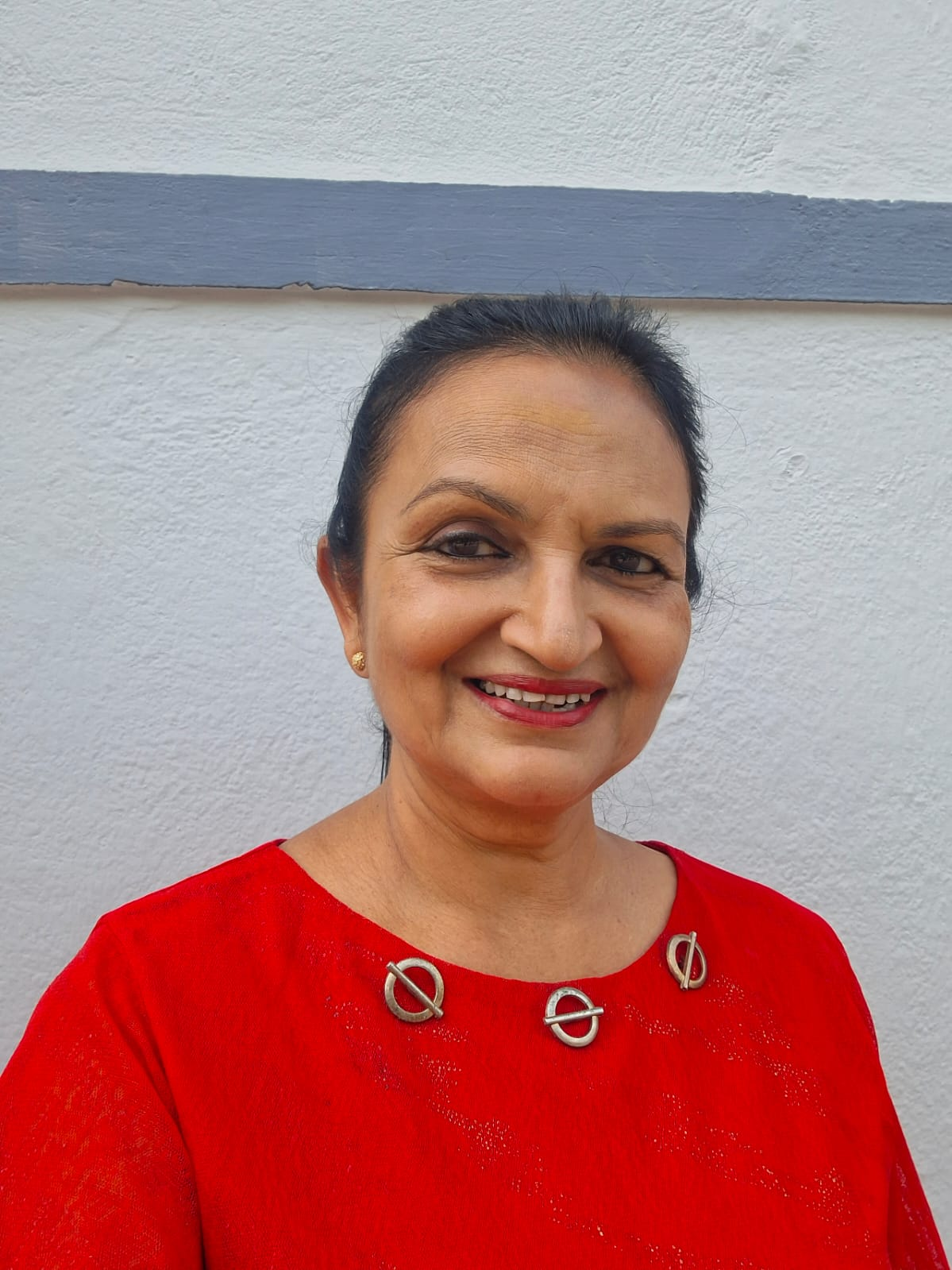
- Born: Kaleeshwari Devi; Andhra Pradesh, India
- Occupations: Actress; Dancer; Entrepreneur; Businessperson
- Years active: 1982–1989; 2019–Present
- Parent: Girija

Kaleeshwari Devi better known by her stage name Saleema is an Indian actress who predominantly acts in Malayalam film and Tamil films. She is best known for her portrayal of Ammini in Aranyakam and Lakshmi in Nakhakshathangal. She is the daughter of Telugu actress Girija.

== Background ==
She had acted in a few Tamil, Kannada and Telugu movies as well. She remained largely invisible in the film industry for many years. She made her comeback to Malayalam film industry through Munthiri Monchan: Oru Thavala Paranja Kadha in 2019.

== Filmography ==
=== Films ===
Year	Title	Role	Language	Notes
1982	Meghasandesam	Ravindra Babu's Daughter	Telugu	Telugu Debut
1985	Sonnathu Nee Thana	Latchmi	Tamil	
1985	Andha Oru Nimidam	Dancer Archana	Tamil	
1985	Njan Piranna Nattil		Malayalam	
1985	Saandham Bheekaram		Malayalam	
1986	Niramulla Ravulkal	Peethambaran's daughter	Malayalam	
1986	Bhagavan		Malayalam	
1986	Nakhakshathangal	Lakshmi	Malayalam	
1987	Onde Goodina Hakkigalu	Sarojini	Kannada	Kannada debut
1987	Kurukkan Rajavayi		Malayalam	
1988	Aranyakam	Ammini	Malayalam	
1989	Mahayanam	Mollykutty	Malayalam	
1989	Vandanam	Mercy	Malayalam	
1991	Vanakkam Vathiyare		Tamil	
2019	Lisaa	Saradha / Nancy	Tamil	
2019	Munthiri Monchan: Oru Thavala Paranja Kadha	Mary	Malayalam	
2023	Demon		Tamil	
2024	Bloody Beggar	Mandakini	Tamil	
2024	DNA	paati	Malayalam	
2025	Rekhachithram	Pushpam/Alice Vincent	Malayalam	

=== Television ===
Year	Title	Role	Channel	Language
2018-2019	Lakshmi Stores	Janaki	Sun TV	Tamil
2019	Lakshmi Stores	Janakamma	Gemini TV	Telugu
2022	Kaiyum Kalavum		SonyLIV	Tamil
2024	Chinna Marumagal		Star Vijay	Tamil
2025–Present	Vinodhini		Sun TV	Tamil

==== Television shows as guest ====
- Onnum Onnum Moonu - Mazhavil Manorama
- Annies Kitchen - Amrita TV
- Varthaprabhatham - Asianet News
- Yours Truly - Mathrubhumi News
