= 40th Kerala State Film Awards =

Annual Indian film awards ceremony

- Awarded for: Best of Malayalam Cinema in 2009
- Date: 6 April 2010
- Location: Thiruvananthapuram
- Country: India
- Presented by: Kerala State Chalachitra Academy
- First award: 1969
- Website: http://www.keralafilm.com

The 40th Kerala State Film Awards, honoring excellence in Malayalam cinema, were announced and presented on 6 April 2010.

== Awards ==
Name of Award	Awardee(s)	Name of Film	Remarks
Best Film	Ranjith	Paleri Manikyam: Oru Pathirakolapathakathinte Katha	
Second Best Film		Ramanam	
Best Director	Hariharan	Pazhassi Raja	
Best Actor	Mammootty	Paleri Manikyam: Oru Pathirakolapathakathinte Katha	
Best Actress	Shwetha Menon	Paleri Manikyam: Oru Pathirakolapathakathinte Katha	
Second Best Actor	Manoj K Jayan	Pazhassi Raja	
Second Best Actress	Padmapriya	Pazhassi Raja	
Best Comedian	Suraj Venjaramoodu	Ivar Vivahitharayal	
Best Child Artist	Baby Niveditha	Bhramaram	
Best Story	Sasi Paravoor	Kadaksham	
Best Cinematography	K G Jayan	Sufi Paranja Katha	
Best Screenplay	M. T. Vasudevan Nair	Pazhassi Raja	
Best Lyrics	Rafeeq Ahammed	Sufi Paranja Katha	for the song Thekkinikkolaya chumaril
Best Music Director	Mohan Sithara	Sufi Paranja Katha	for the song Thekkinikkolaya chumaril
Best Male Playback Singer	K. J. Yesudas	Madhya Venal	for the song Swantham balyathiloode
Best Female Playback Singer	Shreya Ghoshal	Banaras	for the song Chandhu Thottille

== See also ==
- National Film Awards
