= Daivanamathil =

- Poster
- Directed by: Jayaraj
- Written by: Aryadan Shoukath
- Produced by: Aryadan Shoukath
- Starring: Prithviraj Sukumaran; Bhavana; Cochin Haneefa
- Cinematography: Sunny Joseph
- Edited by: Beena Paul
- Music by: Pravin Mani
- Distributed by: Central Pictures
- Release date: 3 June 2005
- Country: India
- Language: Malayalam

Daivanamathil (lit. 'In the Name of God') is a 2005 Indian Malayalam-language film directed by Jayaraj and written and produced by Aryadan Shoukath. The film is based on the Demolition of the Babri Masjid in December 1992, which had its repercussions on Muslims in Kerala. It features Prithviraj Sukumaran and Bhavana in the lead roles.

Daivanamathil was released on 3 June 2005, the film received the Nargis Dutt Award for Best Feature Film on National Integration and Kerala State Film Award for Second Best Actress for Bhavana.

== Plot ==
The story is about Anwar (Prithviraj Sukumaran) who continues his education further at the Aligarh Muslim University soon after his marriage. During his stay the Babri Masjid demolition occurs and as a result he turns into a fundamentalist. His wife, an educated Muslim girl Sameera (Bhavana), tries to change the ideals of her Islamist fanatic husband. But to reform himself he rather chooses the way to jail and starts afresh. The thread of the story is the aftermath of the Babri Masjid demolition and the Gujarat riots.

Anwar encounters a group of Karsevaks in a train, all of them headed towards the demolition of Babri Masjid. The encounter greatly disturbs him and he is no longer the same loving and romantic husband to his wife as well as the engrossed PG student.

He writes a letter to Sameera about his intentions and his decision to join Jehad to seek revenge on others. Anwar goes on to become a full-time extremist and plants a bomb in a hotel at the Ramzan time. This hurts his grandfather a lot who is always against extremism.

Anwar on the other hand is unstoppable and believes that the deaths of innocents are a part of the Jehad. Sahib tells his grandson to stop all his activities at once and warns him about the ugly consequences, the community has to face, because of his deeds, but to no avail.

Meanwhile, Anwar lands up in jail. Sameera only has one wish, her husband should come back to his normal life. He should become her old Anwar, romantic and soft person. During the long jail term, Anwar is shown to grow back into his old gentle self, and Sameera diligently waits for the day of his release. On the day of the release, Sameera boards a bus that goes up to the prison, but the bus explodes killing all of the passengers including Sameera, presumably as a result of terrorist activity. The movie closes as we see the reformed and released Anwar waiting at the prison gate in vain to see Sameera who will never come.

== Cast ==
- Prithviraj as Anwar
- Bhavana as Sameera
- Cochin Haneefa as Sulaiman
- Zeenath
- Nilambur Ayisha
- Unni Ariyanoor as Hasina's father
- Radhika as Najma
- Maliyekkal Mariyumma
- Jayaraj Kozhikode
- Bhasi Puthillam as a police inspector

== Awards ==
National Film Awards

- Nargis Dutt Award for Best Feature Film on National Integration

Kerala State Film Awards

- Kerala State Film Award for Second Best Actress - Bhavana, 2005.

Asianet Film Awards

- Asianet Film Award for Best Supporting Actress for Bhavana in 2005.
