= Kerala State Film Award for Second Best Actress =

Annual Indian film award

- Awarded for: Best performance by an actress in a Malayalam film
- Sponsored by: Kerala State Chalachitra Academy
- First award: 1969
- Final award: 2014
- Most winner: Kaviyoor Ponnamma (4); Sukumari (4); K. P. A. C. Lalitha (4)

Highlights
- Total awarded: 46
- First winner: Adoor Bhavani
- Last winner: Sethulekshmi

The Kerala State Film Award for Second Best Actress was an award presented annually from 1969 to 2014 at the Kerala State Film Awards of India. The Kerala State Film Awards is managed by the Kerala State Chalachitra Academy, an autonomous non-profit institution working under the Department of Cultural Affairs, Government of Kerala. The award was discontinued in 2014 and succeeded by the Kerala State Film Award for Best Character Actress from 2015 onward.

== Superlatives ==
Wins	Recipient(s)
4	Sukumari; K. P. A. C. Lalitha; Kaviyoor Ponnamma

== Winners ==
Year	Actress	Film	Ref.
1969	Adoor Bhavani	Kallichellamma	
1970	Philomina	Thurakkatha Vathil,Olavum Theeravum	
1971	Kaviyoor Ponnamma	Various films	
1972	Kaviyoor Ponnamma	Theerthayathra	
1973	Kaviyoor Ponnamma	Various films	
1974	Sukumari	Chattakkari	
1975	Mallika Sukumaran; KPAC Lalitha	Swapnadanam; Neelaponman, Srishtti	
1976	Kuttyedathi Vilasini	Dweepu	
1977	Shoba	Ormakal Marikkumo	
1978	KPAC Lalitha	Aaravam	
1979	Sukumari	Various films	
1980	Rajam K. Nair	Kolangal	
1981	Madhavi	Valarthumrugangal	
1983	Sukumari	Koodevide, Kariyam Nissaram	
1984	K. R. Vijaya	Ithiripoove Chuvannapoove	
1985	Sukumari Srividya	Arappetta Kettiya Graamathil , Irakal	
1986	Srividya	Ennennum Kannettante	
1987	Philomina	Thaniyavarthanam	
1988	Cuckoo Parameswaran	Ore Thooval Pakshikal	
1989	Geetha	Oru Vadakkan Veeragatha	
1990	KPAC Lalitha	Amaram	
1991	KPAC Lalitha	Kadijool Kalyanam, Godfather, Sandesam	
1992	Santhikrishna	Savidham	
1993	Madhavi	Aakashadooth	
1994	Kaviyoor Ponnamma	Thenmavin Kombathu	
1995	Aranmula Ponnamma	Kathapurushan	
1996	Mini Nair	Desadanam	
1997	Sreelakshmi	Bhoothakkannadi	
1998	Praveena	Agnisakshi	
1999	Lakshmi Gopalaswamy	Arayannangalude Veedu	
2000	Vani Viswanath	Susanna	
2001	Sona Nair	Neythukaran	
2002	Jyothirmayi	Bhavam	
2003	Roslin	Padam Onnu Oru Vilapam	
2004	Sheela	Akale	
2005	Bhavana	Daivanamathil	
2006	Padmapriya	Karutha Pakshikal, Yes Your Honour	
2007	Lakshmi Gopalaswami	Thaniye	
2008	Praveena	Oru Pennum Randaanum	
2009	Padmapriya	Pazhassi Raja	
2010	Mamta Mohandas	Kadha Thudarunnu	
2011	Nilambur Ayisha	Oomakkuyil Padumbol	
2012	Sajitha Madathil	Shutter	
2013	Lena	Left Right Left, Kanyaka Talkies	
2014	Sethu Lakshmi	How Old Are You?	

== See also ==
- Kerala State Film Award for Best Character Actress
