= Sree Guruvayoorappan =

Sree Guruvayoorappan may refer to:

- Guruvayurappan, a form of the Hindu god Vishnu worshipped in Guruvayur, Kerala, India
- Sree Guruvayoorappan (1964 film), an Indian Malayalam-language film
- Sree Guruvayoorappan (1972 film), an Indian Malayalam-language film
