= Jyothibai Pariyadath =

Indian poet, translator, transcriber and blogger (born 1965)

- Born: Jyothibai; 26 April 1965 Palakkad, Kerala, India
- Occupation: Writer, Poet, Translator and blogger
- Language: Malayalam
- Spouse: Kunduveettil Janardhananan

Jyothibai Pariyadath is a poet, translator, transcriber and blogger in Malayalam language from Palakkad, Kerala, India.

== Early life and education ==
Born on 26 April 1965 in Nemmara village in Palakkad district, as seventh child of Anthikkaad Puzhukoloth Krishna Panicker and Nemmara Pariyadath Sathybhama Amma. She did her studies at Pazhayagramam GLP School, Govt.Girls high school Nemmara and NSS college Nemmara. She Completed her graduation in Chemistry and post graduation in sociology and Malayalam.

== Career ==
Jyothibai actively started writing poems in periodicals in 2008 periodicals such as Kalakaumudi and madhyamam weekly. Her first work is a transcription Mayilammaoru jeevitham which is about Mayilamma the tribal warrior of Plachimada struggle against the Coca-Cola company. This book was translated to Tamil language as Mayilamma Porattame vazhkai by sukumaran, published in 2007, English translation were included in different universities as a study material for cultural and environmental studies. She was a member of the Purogamana Kala Sahitya Sangham state committee, O. V. Vijayan Smarakasamithi, Palakkad district Public library. Was in the editorial board of the book' Palakkad Sthalam Kalam Charithram' which describes the cultural history of Palakkad published DTPC Palakkad. She published two blogs (poems and translations) and Kavyam Sugeyam. Which is an audio blog . She herself recited several poems of many renowned poets in Malayalam. She was a judge in the Kairali Mambazham poetry recital reality show in two seasons. Was a member of the kavyanjali panel for reciting poems in All India Radio Thrissur Station.

== Personal life ==
She is Married to Kunduveettil Janardhananan.

== Works ==
=== Poetry ===
- 2009 - Pesamatantha, Fabian books & 2015 - Sahithya Pravarthaka Co-operative Society
- 2017- Kodich, Chintha publishers
- 2021- Mooliyalankari, DC Books

=== Translations ===
- 2009- La Notte - Script of the movie La Notte of Michelangelo Antonioni
- 2013- Mayakowski kavithakal - poems of Vladimir Mayakovsky

=== Transcriptions ===
- 2006 Mayilammaoru jeevitham, MathrubhumiBooks
- 2007 Mayilamma Porattame Vazhkai -Tamil translated by Sugumaran, published by Ethir Veliyedu
- 2018 Mayilamma the story of a Tribal eco warrior - English translated by Prof. Swarnalatha Rangarajan, of IIT Madras and Dr. Sreejith Varma, of Christ University, published by Orient

Black swan hydarabad

== Awards ==
- 2010- Kovai cultural centre literary award (pesamatantha)
- 2021- Muthukulam Parvathiyamma smaraka Sahithya puraskaram.(Mooliyalankari)

== Sources ==
- Poetry in a sweet voice
- ജ്യോതിഭായ് പരിയേടത്തിന്റെ കവിത.
- You can listen to poems on this blog in Kozhikode
- O.V. Vijayan literary awards announced
- Mayilamma: The Life of a Tribal Eco-Warrior - -on a tribal widow who fights for cause
- Book Launch: Mayilamma, The Life of an Eco-Tribal Warrior | Professor Swarnalatha and Mr. Sreejith
