= Father's Day (2012 film) =

- Directed by: Kalavoor Ravikumar
- Written by: Kalavoor Ravikumar
- Produced by: Bharath Samuel J.
- Starring: Shehin; Indu Thampy; Revathi; Lal; Shankar Panikkar
- Cinematography: S. G. Raman
- Edited by: K. Sreenivas
- Music by: M. G. Sreekumar; Sajeev Mangalath
- Release date: 17 February 2012
- Country: India
- Language: Malayalam

Father's Day is a 2012 Malayalam film directed by Kalavoor Ravikumar, starring Shehin, Indu Thampy, Revathi, Lal and Shankar Panikkar in the lead roles. this is the second film from director Kalavoor Ravikumar, who earlier directed Oridathoru Puzhayundu. Oscar award winner Resul Pookutty made his acting debut through this film.

== Plot ==
The story revolves around Seetha, a tutor in a Government College. A person continuously goes behind her, spying her and later when they both meet up, he tells that he is a Criminology student, who specializes in rapes. Seetha Lives in her niece's house. She has a caring brother, who is afraid that Seetha is not married yet. This student turns out to be her own son. He wanted to research on her history, so he collects all the relevant evidences, and starts his work. The story goes on and on, until it ends up in a DNA test. The story later revolves on how he takes revenge on the 4 rapists.

== Cast ==
- Shehin as Joseph K. Joseph
- Indu Thampy
- Revathi as Prof. Seethalakshmi
- Lal as Seethalakshmi's suitor
- Shankar Panikkar as Ram Menon
- Idavela Babu as Abeed Ali
- Suresh Krishna
- Vijay Menon as Noble Mathew
- Maya Viswanath as Betty Noble Mathew
- Reena Basheer as Geetha Menon
- Vineeth as Gopan
- Jagathy Sreekumar
- Lakshmi Priya
- K. P. A. C. Lalitha
- Chithra Shenoy as Dr. Elizabeth Thomas
- Resul Pookutty

== Reception ==
A critic from Rediff.com said that "Father's Day is not flawless but we can appreciate the effort it takes to make a meaningful film that tackles a difficult subject with some degree of success". A critic from Indiaglitz wrote that "Father's Day, in not a regular plot, is meant for those who like a little difference in a regular pattern of a tearjerker".
