= Baby Niveditha =

Indian actress

- Born: Nivedita Vijayan; Abu Dhabi, United Arab Emirates
- Other name: Baby Nivedita
- Education: St Joseph's School, NIT Calicut
- Occupation: Actress
- Years active: 2006–2012
- Known for: Performance in Kanakanmani, Moz&Cat and Brahmaram
- Parents: Vijayan Parayankot Veetil (father); Praseetha Sivasankaran (mother)
- Relatives: Niranjana Vijayan (Sister)
- Awards: Kerala State Film Award 2009 – Best Child Artist (Bhramaram)

Niveditha Vijayan credited as Baby Niveditha is a former Indian child actress who works predominantly in Malayalam films. She won the Kerala State Film Award for Best Child Artist in 2009 for her acting in Kaana Kanmani and Bhramaram.

== Personal life ==
She is born as the second child to Vijayan and Praseetha who has settled in Abu Dhabi. She has an elder sister named Niranjana Vijayan who is also an actress.

== Filmography ==
Year	Film	Role	Notes
2006	Palunku	Neethu	Debut film
2007	Azhagiya Thamizh Magan	Renuka	Debut Tamil film
2008	Innathe Chintha Vishayam	Treesa's daughter	
2009	Bhramaram	Lakshmi	
2009	Moz & Cat	Tessy	
2009	Kaana Kanmani	Shivani/Anakha	

== Awards ==
Year	Ceremony	Category	Film	Result
2009	2009 Kerala State Film Awards	Best Child Artist	Bhramaram; Kaana Kanmani	Won
2009	Kerala Film Critics Association Awards	Best Child Artist	Bhramaram	Won
2009	Annual Malayalam Movie Award	Best Child artist	Bhramaram	Won
2009	Surya film awards 2009	Best child artist female	Bhramaram	Won
2009	Vanitha Film Awards 2009	Best child actress	Kaana Kanmani	Won
2009	Asianet Film Awards	Best Child Artist (Male/Female)	Bhramaram; Kaana Kanmani	Won
2008	Asianet Film Awards	Best Child Artist (Male/Female)	Innathe Chintha Vishayam	Won
2006	Mathrubhumi film awards 2006	Best child actress	Palunku	Won
2006	Jaycey foundation film awards 2006	Best child artist	Palunku	Won
2006	Asianet Film Awards	Best Child Artist (Male/Female)	Palunku	Won
