= Prem Nawas =

Indian producer and actor

- Born: Abdul Wahab; 1 January 1932; Chirayinkeezhu, Travancore, British India
- Died: 27 March 1992 (aged 60); Madras, Tamil Nadu, India
- Occupation: actor
- Years active: 1952–1980
- Spouse: Sulochana
- Children: Prem Kishore
- Parent(s): Shahul Hamid, Asmabeevi
- Relatives: Prem Nazir (brother); Shanawas (nephew)

Prem Nawas (born Abdul Wahab) was an Indian actor and producer in Malayalam cinema, and the younger brother of Malayalam cinema actor Prem Nazir. His parents were Shahul Hameed and Asma Beevi. He lost his mother at a very young age, and his father remarried. He moved to Madras, before his brother, in search of a film career. He debuted as the hero of Koodapirappu in 1956. He was the hero in the first colour film made in Malayalam, Kandam Becha Kottu. He also played an important role in the 1974 blockbuster Nellu, directed by Ramu Kariyattu. When he found he could not succeed as well as his brother as an actor, he turned to producing films. He produced the award-winning blockbuster Agniputhri (1967), starring his brother and Sheela, the evergreen pair of Malayalam cinema. His son Prem Kishore was an actor as well, and appeared in two Malayalam films, Vacation and Thaskara Puthran.

Prem Nawas died in a train accident in Madras on March 27, 1992, at age 60.

== Filmography ==
=== As an actor ===
Year	Film	Role	Notes
1956	Koodappirappu		
1959	Naadodikal		
1960	Sthreehridayam		
1961	Arappavan	Bhasi	
1961	Kandam Becha Kottu	Ummer	
1962	Kalpadukal		
1962	Shree Rama Pattabhishekam	Lakshmanan	
1962	Veluthambi Dalawa	Unni Namboodiri	
1964	Atom Bomb	Sudhakaran	
1964	Sree Guruvayoorappan	Mahavishnu	
1965	Ammu	Appu	
1965	Subaidha	Salim	
1965	Kadathukaran	SI Mukundan	
1968	Karthika	Prabhakaran	
1971	Anadha Shilpangal	Jagadeeshan	
1971	Yogamullaval		
1971	Manpeda		
1972	Preethi		
1973	Thottavadi	Pulluvan	
1974	Nellu	Unnikrishnan	
1974	Kanyakumari	Jayan	
1974	Vrindavanam		
1977	Poojakkedukkatha Pookkal	Maniswami	
1983	Prem Nazirine Kanmanilla	Himself	

=== As a producer ===
- Agniputhri (1967)
- Neethi (1971)
- Thulaavarsham (1976)
- Poojakkedukkaatha Pookkal (1977)
- Keni (1982)
