= Veluthambi Dalawa (film) =

Malayalam film

Veluthampi Dalawa
- Film poster
- Directed by: G. Viswanath
- Screenplay by: Jagathy N. K. Achary
- Produced by: P. K. Satyapal
- Starring: Kottarakkara Sreedharan Nair; Thikkurissy Sukumaran Nair; Prem Nawas; Adoor Bhasi; G. K. Pillai; Ragini
- Cinematography: P. K. Madhavan Nair
- Edited by: K. D. George
- Music by: V. Dakshinamoorthy
- Production company: Oriental Movies
- Distributed by: Chandrathara
- Release date: 22 February 1962 (Kerala)
- Country: India
- Language: Malayalam

Veluthampi Dalawa is a 1962 Malayalam-language historical drama film based on the life of Velu Thampi Dalawa, the Dewan of Travancore, during the first decade of 19th century, was one of the first to rebel against the British East India Company's supremacy. The film, directed by G. Viswanath and written by Jagathy N. K. Achary, was shot in Newton Studios. Kottarakkara Sreedharan Nair, Thikkurissy Sukumaran Nair, Prem Nawas, Adoor Bhasi, G. K. Pillai, Ragini, Ambika Sukumaran and Sukumari portrayed prominent roles. The dances were choreographed by Chinni and Sampath along with Kalamandalam Madhavan. The film was a box office success.

== Plot ==
During the tyrannical regime of Jayanthan Namboodiri, the 'Dalawa' of Travancore, the country was plagued by corruption and mismanagement at all levels. Veluthampi, who was in royal service, succeeded in exposing the tyranny of Jayanthan Namboodiri and rose to the position of Dalawa. Jayanthan Namboodiri's ears were cut as punishment, and he was banished from Travancore.

Veluthampi resorted to harsh punishments in order to improve the law and order of the kingdom. His overbearing conduct created resentment among his colleagues. The corrupt revenue officer Mallan Pillai was punished and terminated from service. The powerful cabinet official Kunju Neelan Pillai and his group were supporters of the British East India Company. They leaked the defence secrets of the country to the Resident British Officer Macaulay. Veluthampi was vigilant and, in his landmark 'Kundara Proclamation' urged the people to fight against the British. This made him popular among the states of Cochin and Kozhikode, and they offered their support to him in his fight against the British.

Jagadambika was in love with Veluthampi and supported him in his plans against the British. She entered Macaulay's bungalow in disguise and managed to recover the defence files, but was shot dead. Before she died, Jagadambika handed over the files to Veluthampi. He took an oath to drive out the British from the country.

The British succeeded in invading and capturing several towns and villages surrounding Thiruvananthapuram. Veluthampi requested the king to release more arms and ammunition, including rifles, to fight against the British. Kunju Neelan Pillai alleged that it was Veluthampi who provoked the British against Travancore. The king believes the allegation, and Veluthampi quit his post as Dalawa. After conducting the marriage of his niece Seethalakshmi and Unni Namboodiri, Veluthampi left to take refuge in the sanctum sanctorum of Mannadi Temple along with his brother Padmanabhan Thampi. The British surrounded the temple, but Veluthampi killed himself before they could enter; Padmanabhan decapitated Veluthampi.

== Cast ==
- Kottarakkara Sreedharan Nair as Veluthampi Dalawa
- Thikkurissy Sukumaran Nair as Jayanthan Namboodiri
- Ragini as Jagadambika
- Adoor Bhasi as Mallan Pillai
- Ambika Sukumaran as Seethalakshmi
- Prem Nawas as Unni Namboodiri
- G. K. Pillai as Kunju Neelan Pillai
- Satyapal as Macaulay
- Bahadoor as Peter, Macauly's butler
- Sukumari as Janaki
- Aranmula Ponnamma
- N. N. Pillai
- T. R. Omana as Rahael
- Kedamangalam Sadanandan
- Parthasarathy
- R. N. Nambiar
- A. R. Kizhuthally
- Panjabi as Subha Iyyer
- Velayudhan Nair
- Simhalan
- P. A. Thomas as Mathew Tharakan
- Wahab Kashmiri

== Soundtrack ==
The music was composed by V. Dakshinamoorthy and Parthasarathy and lyrics were written by Abhayadev. The tracks "Innu Nalla Laakkaa", "Viral Onnillenkilum", "Enthinu Moham", and "Kaathu Kolka Njangale" were popular during those times.

No.	Song	Singers
1	"Aakasathilirikkum"	Shantha P. Nair
2	"Enthinnu Moham"	P. Leela
3	"Innu Nalla Laakkaa"	K. Rani, K. P. Udayabhanu
4	"Kaathukolka Nangale"	P. Leela
5	"Kappalileri Kadal Kadannu"	P. Leela
6	"Poojari Vannille"	P. Leela, T. S. Kumaresh
7	"Pushpaanjalikal"	K. J. Yesudas
8	"Thankachilanka Kilukki"	P. Leela]
9	"Viralonnillenkilum"	A. P. Komala, K. P. Udayabhanu

== Legacy ==
The film's success and the performance of Kottarakkara Sreedharan Nair as Veluthampi Dalawa prompted Udaya Studio and director Kunchacko to cast him as Kerala Varma Pazhassi Raja in their historical film Pazhassi Raja (1964), but it did not perform well at the box office.
