= Kandam Becha Kottu =

- Directed by: T. R. Sundaram
- Written by: K. T. Muhammed; T. Muhammad Yusuf
- Produced by: T. R. Sundaram
- Starring: Thikkurissy Sukumaran Nair; Prem Nawas; Aranmula Ponnamma
- Cinematography: T. M. Sundarababu
- Edited by: Balu
- Music by: Baburaj
- Production company: Modern Theatres
- Release date: 24 August 1961
- Running time: 156 minutes
- Country: India
- Language: Malayalam

Kandam Becha Kottu (transl. The Patched-up Coat) is a 1961 Indian Malayalam-language drama film directed and produced by T. R. Sundaram under the banner of Modern Theatres. It stars Thikkurissy Sukumaran Nair and Prem Nawas in the lead roles, along with T. S. Muthaiah, Aranmula Ponnamma and Ambika Sukumaran in supporting roles. The film deals with the negative effects of the dowry system in India through customs of the Muslim community. It notably became Malayalam cinema's first full-length colour film.

Kandam Becha Kottu was based on a popular novel by T. Muhammad Yusuf. Sundaram had earlier produced and directed Malayalam cinema's first talkie Balan (1938). The film was initially planned to be K. S. Sethumadhavan's directorial debut. However, when Sundaram decided to shoot the film in colour, which would be much more expensive than planned, he decided to direct the film himself. The screenplay of the film was written by K. T. Muhammed in the Kozhikodan dialect. The film's music was composed by M. S. Baburaj, while the cinematography was done by T. Sundarababu.

Kandam Becha Kottu was released on 24 August 1961 to high expectations, being the first colour film and Eastmancolor film in Malayalam. The film was a huge box office success, running for weeks in packed theatres. The film received the Certificate of Merit for Second Best Feature Film in Malayalam at the 9th National Film Awards.

== Cast ==
- Thikkurissy Sukumaran Nair as Alikoya Haji
- Prem Nawas as Ummer
- T. S. Muthaiah as Mammadikka
- Ambika Sukumaran as Kunju Bivi
- Pankajavalli as Kadeeja
- Aranmula Ponnamma as Amina
- Nellikode Bhaskaran as Hassan
- Kedamangalam Sadanandan as Avaran
- S. P. Pillai as Minnal Moideen
- Bahadoor as Khader
- Nilambur Ayisha as Bethatha
- Chandni as Beechipathu
- Kottayam Chellappan
- Omana
- Muttathara Soman

== Crew ==
- director - T. R. Sundaram
- producer - Modern Theatres
- writer - K. T. Muhammed -T. Muhammad Yusuf
- music - Baburaj
- Art Direction - A.J.Dominic

== Soundtrack ==
The music was composed by M. S. Baburaj and lyrics were written by P. Bhaskaran.

No.	Song	Singers	Lyrics	Length (m:ss)
1	"Aananda Saamraajyathil"	P. Leela	P. Bhaskaran	
2	"Aatte Potte Irikkatte"	P. Leela, M. S. Baburaj	P. Bhaskaran	
3	"Allaavin Thiruvullam"	P. B. Sreenivas	P. Bhaskaran	
4	"Ennittum Vannillallo"	P. Leela	P. Bhaskaran	
5	"Kandam Bechoru Kottaanu"	M. S. Baburaj, Mehboob	P. Bhaskaran	
6	"Maappila Puthumaappila"	P. Leela, Kamukara	P. Bhaskaran	
7	"Puthan Manavatti"	P. Leela, Gomathy Sisters	P. Bhaskaran	
8	"Sindabad"	Mehboob	P. Bhaskaran	
9	"Thekkunnu Vanna Kaatte"	P. Leela	P. Bhaskaran	

== Reception ==
The film was a big box office success and ran for weeks in packed theatres.

== Awards ==
National Film Awards

- 1961: Certificate of Merit for Second Best Feature Film in Malayalam
