= Moz & Cat =

- Promotional poster
- Directed by: Fazil
- Written by: Fazil
- Produced by: Johny Sagarika
- Starring: Dileep; Rahman
- Cinematography: Anandakuttan
- Edited by: K. R. Gaurishankar
- Music by: Ouseppachan
- Production company: Johnny Sagarika Film Company
- Release date: 12 April 2009
- Country: India
- Language: Malayalam

Moz & Cat is a 2009 Indian Malayalam-language comedy thriller film written and directed by Fazil, starring Dileep, Aswathi Ashok and Rahman.

== Cast ==
- Dileep as Moz D. Samuel
- Baby Niveditha as Tezzy (Cat)
- Aswathi Ashok as Nandana (Nandu)
- Rahman as Sumesh
- Manoj K. Jayan as Panakal das
- Jagathy Sreekumar as Father Cyriac John
- Harisree Ashokan as Kunnumel Shankaran/ Shankaran kunnumel
- Janardhanan as Outha
- Sudheesh as Stephen
- Jaffar Idukki as Father Kuriakose
- Sudheer Sukumaran Das 'Assistant
- Anoop Chandran as Kunjoonju
- Priyanka as toilet cleaner (cameo)

== Soundtrack ==
The film's soundtrack contains 7 songs, all composed by Ouseppachan and lyrics written by Kaithapram Damodaran Namboothiri.

=== Tracklist ===
#	Title	Singer(s)
1	"Five Star"	K. J. Yesudas
2	"Innu Kondu Theerum"	Biju Narayanan, Jagathy Sreekumar, Durga Viswanath, Anoop Chandran, Harishree Ashokan, Sudheesh
3	"Kulir Manju"	Sujatha Mohan, Sudeep Kumar
4	"Oru Koodanayaanoru"	M. G. Sreekumar, Sujatha Mohan
5	"Thottaal Pookkum"	Shweta Mohan
6	"Thottaal Pookkum [Pathos] [F]"	Parvathy Manjunath
7	"Thottaal Pookkum [Pathos] [M]"	Yasir Sali

== Reception ==
Sify.com wrote that "With a script that is full of flaws, the film is like a never ending journey. Fazil should call it day and retire gracefully, than making such stupid films. Our advice- Pick some of the old gems (DVD) of the director like Nokketha Doorathu Kannum Nattu, Ente Mamattikuttiyammaykku, Manivathoorile Ayiram Sivarathrikal or Aniyathi Pravu and re-live those fine memories . You will find it much more enjoyable than getting a migraine watching this film!" Paresh C Palicha from Rediff.com wrote" All seen and suffered; Fazil's Moz & Cat may just turn out to be the biggest disappointment of this festive season" Unni R Nair from Indian Express wrote "sadly enough, it turns out to be a damp squib. Dileep is his usual self as Moz, while Baby Nivedhitha is good as Tessy. Debutante Ashwathy is also good as Nandana. The rest of the cast are all strictly okay. Music, technical aspects etc. jell with the theme and the mood, but it's the confusion about the overall mood that's to be mentioned. It's rather confusing and hence whatever is good about Moz And Cat is lost in this maze"
