= Chakkaramuthu =

Indian film directed by A. K. Lohithadas

- VCD cover
- Directed by: A. K. Lohithadas
- Written by: A. K. Lohithadas
- Produced by: G. P. Vijayakumar
- Starring: Dileep; Kavya Madhavan; Sai Kumar; Jishnu Raghavan
- Cinematography: Raajaratnam
- Edited by: Raja Mohammad
- Music by: M. Jayachandran (songs); Ouseppachan (background music)
- Release date: 17 November 2006
- Running time: 150 minutes
- Country: India
- Language: Malayalam

Chakkaramuthu (Darling) is a 2006 Indian Malayalam-language film directed by A. K. Lohithadas and starring Dileep, Sai Kumar, Jishnu and Kavya Madhavan. Made by Seven Arts International and produced by G. P. Vijayakumar, the film was distributed by Seven Arts Release. The story, screenplay, and dialogue are by A. K. Lohithadas. Dileep plays the role of a person with an intellectual disability.

The film was initially released with a tragic ending but was changed to a more bittersweet ending.

== Plot ==
Aravindan is a sought-after tailor, specialising in blouses, and works in a shop owned by Kumaran. Despite his evident mental difficulty, he is shown as worldly-wise, with his own way of dealing with things.

He loves Anitha deeply while she feels pity for him. In fact, he is known as her black cat security. One day, at the instigation of his friend Santosh, he tries to kiss her. She is shocked but later uses the incident to cover up her relationship with Jeevan from her strict mother, who wants her to marry a doctor, Rajiv.

Anitha's uncle Vijayaraghavan, a police officer, and her mother fix her marriage after learning about her affair. She elopes with Jeevan and goes to Bangalore with the help of Aravindan but soon realizes that Jeevan is a pervert. When Jeevan tries to molest her, Anita ends up accidentally killing him. Aravindan, who knows the truth, helps her escape from the police who are looking for them.

Now wanted for murder, Anita tries to convince Aravindan to leave her and escape, but he refuses. This makes Anita realize Aravindan's love for her, as well as the hopelessness of their situation, as both of them are now being mercilessly pursued. They decide to commit suicide, rather than living in a painful world, and lay on a railway track. But the train driver spots them and stops the train, sparing them. Later, Anita and Aravindan are arrested for murder, but they decide to accept their fate, with the realization that they have found each other in the process.

Original Theatrical Ending

After learning that Jeevan has been killed, and Anita and Aravindan are somehow involved, a desperate Vijayaraghavan asks for them to be captured and the murder be pinned on Aravindan. Anita and Aravindan try to hide from the police but are discovered and chased. Eventually, Aravindan is fatally shot by the police while trying to protect Anita, who completely breaks down after seeing Aravindan get killed.

Sometime later, Anita, who has become mentally unstable due her trauma, is shown in an institution sitting on a wheelchair beside her mother, where she hallucinates Aravindan smiling at her.

This ending was only shown during the early release days of the film and was changed due to negative feedbacks. It however has not been made available anywhere since.

== Cast ==
- Dileep as Aravindan
- Kavya Madhavan as Anitha, Aravindan's Love Interest
- Lakshmy Ramakrishnan as Anitha's Mother (voice dubbed by Sreepriya)
- Jishnu Raghavan as Jeevan George, Anitha's Fake Lover
- Sai Kumar as DYSP Vijayaraghavan, Anitha's Uncle
- Cochin Haneefa as Kumaran / Kumarettan, Aravindan's Friend
- Kalabhavan Navas as Santhosh, Aravindan's Friend
- Manikandan Pattambi as Shivanandan, Aravindan's Elder Brother
- Santhakumari as Servant
- Mahesh as Ravi, Anitha's Uncle
- Sarath as Rajeev, Anitha's Fiancé
- Sarayu as Dhanya, Anitha's Friend
- Kochu Preman as Kundara Ramachandran
- Sreekala as Aravindan's Mother
- Jayashree Sivadhas as Younger Anitha
- Lakshmipriya
- Dimple Rose
- Ravindran
