= Kaazhcha =

- VCD Cover
- കാഴ്ച
- Directed by: Blessy
- Written by: Blessy
- Produced by: Chef K. Naushad; Xavy Mano Mathew
- Starring: Mammootty; Padmapriya; Yash Malaviya; Innocent; Sanusha; Venu Nagavalli; Manoj K. Jayan
- Cinematography: Alagappan N
- Edited by: Raja Mohammad
- Music by: Mohan Sithara
- Production company: NX Visual Entertainment
- Distributed by: Liberty Cinemas
- Release date: 27 August 2004
- Running time: 137 minutes
- Country: India
- Language: Malayalam

Kaazhcha (transl. Vision) is a 2004 Indian Malayalam-language family drama written and directed by Blessy, in his directorial debut. The story revolves around a boy, Pavan (Yash Malaviya), who reaches Kerala after losing everything in the 2001 Gujarat earthquake. Film projectionist Madhavan (Mammootty) happens to meet the boy and takes him with him. The film won three Filmfare Awards South.

== Plot ==
Madhavan, a simple village man who gets bitten by the film bug in his childhood, gives up his studies and finally ends up as a projectionist. He tours the countryside with his 16 mm projector and shows films at temple festivals and other public events. Madhavan's family consists of his wife and a daughter.

Madhavan comes across a six-year-old boy who was displaced from his native land (Gujarat) and separated from his family after the devastating 2001 Gujarat earthquake. He was taken into a gang of beggars from where he managed to escape. Madhavan takes the boy home and cares for him, just like a son. He and his family takes a fondness for the boy, but eventually find out that they cannot adopt the boy legally. The boy is taken away from Madhavan to a juvenile home and allegations of ill treatment is charged on Madhavan, but soon dismissed. The issue gets media coverage.

Madhavan then goes to Gujarat with the boy with hopes of finding his family or adopting him. At the disaster camp in Gujarat, Madhavan understands that the boys relatives are all probably dead but due to legal hurdles, the boy must stay at the camp as there is an expectation that his real parents might be traced. Madhavan, dejected, returns to his family in Kerala.

== Cast ==
- Mammootty as Madhavan
- Padmapriya as Lakshmi Madhavan
- Yash Malaviya as Pavan a.k.a. Kochundapri
- Sanusha as Ambily
- Manoj K. Jayan as Joy
- Innocent as Fr. Kuriakose
- Augustine as Suresh
- Venu Nagavalli as Magistrate
- Hakim Rawther as man at film club society
- T. S. Raju as Police Officer
- Nedumburam Gopi as Madhavan's father
- Pala Aravindan as Mathai mapla-Film Distributor
- Binda as Old man's daughter
- Vyjayanthi as Sreelatha Menon

== Production ==
The film marked the debut of Blessy as an independent director, and Padmapriya as actress. It was also the debut of Ranjith Ambady, who was an assistant of Pattanam Rasheed.

== Soundtrack ==
Except for the song Jugunure, lyrics for all other songs were written by Kaithapram Damodaran Namboothiri, while lyrics for Jugunure were written by K.J.Singh. All songs were composed by Mohan Sithara.

No.	Title	Artist(s)	Length
1.	"Jugunure"	Anwar Sadat
2.	"Kunje Ninakku Vendi"	K. J. Yesudas
3.	"Dup Dup Janaki"	Mubina Mohan, Priya R Pai
4.	"Kuttanadan Kaayalile"	Madhu Balakrishnan, Kalabhavan Mani
5.	"Kunje Ninakku Vendi"	Asha Madhu

== Critical reception ==
Sify gave a verdict "Excellent" saying "The biggest asset of Kazhcha is the story and screenplay by Blessy, (an associate of Lohithadas) which is perfect. Another plus point of the film is the racy way in which the director has been able to tell the story with right mix of comedy and sentiments woven into the plot." The critic praised Mammootty for his "perfect comedy timing", also saying "Mammooty is the heart and soul of the film and he has proved once again that no actor can match up to him in such roles." Rediff ranked Kaazhcha amongst the best films of 2004, writing, "Kaazhcha was different from the majority of films seen over recent years. After a long time, a film was made with an original concept. Blessy's apprenticeship under the late Padmarajan was evident in each frame."

== Box office ==
The film was released onam weekend.Initially it had slow response. But later the film gained popularity and emerged as box office success.

== Awards ==
Kerala State Film Awards - 2004

- Kerala State Film Award for Best Film with Popular appeal & Aesthetic quality – Chef K. Naushad &

Xavy Mano Mathew

- Kerala State Film Award for Best Debutant Director -Blessy
- Kerala State Film Award for Best Actor – Mammootty
- Kerala State Film Award for Best Child artist – Baby Sanusha & Master Yash

Filmfare Awards South - 2004

- Best Film – Kaazhcha
- Best Director – Blessy
- Best Actor – Mammootty

Asianet Film Awards - 2004

- Best Film – Chef K. Naushad &

Xavy Mano Mathew

- Best Actor – Mammootty
- Best New Face of The Year (Female) – Padmapriya
- Best Child artist – Master Yash
- Best Cameraman - Azhagappan

Others

- John Abraham Award for Best Malayalam Film (2004) - Chef K. Naushad &

Xavy Mano Mathew
