= Pranav Mohanlal =

Indian actor (born 1990)

- Born: 13 July 1990 (age 36); Thiruvananthapuram, Kerala, India
- Education: University of New South Wales
- Occupation: Actor
- Years active: 2002–2003 , 2009 (child artist); 2018–present
- Parents: Mohanlal (father); Suchitra Mohanlal (mother)
- Relatives: Vismaya Mohanlal (sister); Suresh Balaje (uncle); K. Balaji (grandfather)
- Family: Mohanlal-Balaji family
- Awards: Kerala State Film Awards (2002)

Pranav Mohanlal (born 13 July 1990) is an Indian actor, who works in Malayalam cinema.The son of actor Mohanlal, Pranav made his acting debut as a child actor portraying the younger version of his father's character in Onnaman (2002), followed by a lead role in Punarjani (2003), for which he received the Kerala State Film Award for Best Child Artist.

After a long hiatus, he returned to the films in 2015 as an assistant director to Jeethu Joseph, working on Papanasam and Life of Josutty. He made his comeback to acting with the title role in Aadhi (2018), directed by Jeethu Joseph, for which he won the SIIMA Award for Best Debut Actor. In addition to acting, he made his debut as a singer-songwriter by writing, composing, and performing the song “Gypsy Women” for the film.

Pranav found commercial success starring in Vineeth Sreenivasan's coming-of-age romantic drama film Hridayam (2022) and the period comedy drama Varshangalkku Shesham (2024) Rahul Sadasivan's Horror thriller film Dies Irae (2025).

== Early life ==
Pranav Mohanlal was born on 13 July 1990 in Trivandrum (now Thiruvananthapuram), Kerala in India to actor Mohanlal and Suchitra Mohanlal. He has a younger sister, Vismaya Mohanlal. His maternal grandfather is the Tamil film producer K. Balaji and his maternal uncle Suresh Balaje is also a producer.

Pranav completed his schooling from a boarding school, the Hebron School, in Ooty, Tamil Nadu. He graduated with a bachelor's degree in philosophy from the University of New South Wales in Australia. Known for maintaining an extremely private lifestyle, Pranav has not given any interviews or appeared at award shows, advertisements throughout his acting career spanning nearly a decade. He is also known for being highly selective about his projects, typically appearing in one film every one or two years.

== Career ==
Pranav made his screen debut in 2002, appearing in a minor role in the action crime drama Onnaman, starring his father Mohanlal and directed by Thampi Kannanthanam. He played the childhood version of his father's character Ravisankar. In the same year, he acted in his first leading role in Punarjani, a drama directed by Major Ravi and Rajesh Amanakara. He played Appu, a troubled child who ran away from home thinking his parents love his younger brother more than him. His performance earned him the Kerala State Film Award for Best Child Artist. After that, he took a break to concentrate on his education. He stayed away from film industry and was not keen on returning to pursue acting, as he was interested in books and travel more than cinema. In between, he made a cameo appearance in a song in Sagar Alias Jacky Reloaded in 2009. Director Priyadarshan, who is also their family friend said in an interview: "He is a terrific actor. I have seen him act in plays in school and he was selected as the best actor too ... But now, he says he does not want to be [in] cinema".

In 2014, Pranav began working as an assistant director under Jeethu Joseph in the Tamil film Papanasam (2015), starring Kamal Haasan. He continued working as an assistant in Jeethu's next film Life of Josutty (2015) before departing. In September 2016, it was announced that he would be returning as an actor in a film to be directed by Jeethu and produced by Aashirvad Cinemas. The action-thriller titled Aadhi began principal photography in August 2017 and was released in January 2018. He wrote, sang and performed the English song "Gypsy Women" in the film. Aadhi received positive response, particularly for Pranav's parkour stunt; the film was a commercial success grossing ₹35 crore in a month. It was one of the highest-grossing Malayalam films of the year. His second film Irupathiyonnaam Noottaandu directed by Arun Gopy and produced by Tomichan Mulakuppadam was released in 2019, receiving mostly negative reviews and was a commercial failure.

He appeared in a guest role as young Kunjali Marakkar IV in the Priyadarshan-directed period film Marakkar: Arabikadalinte Simham (2020), starring Mohanlal. In 2020, he began filming Hridayam, written and directed by Vineeth Sreenivasan. Released worldwide in January 2022, the film was well received by critics and was one of the highest-grossing films of the year. He collaborated again with Vineeth for Varshangalkku Shesham (2024).The film released to positive to mixed response from critics and audience but collected well at the box office eventually became one of the highest grossing Malayalam film of 2024.

In 2025, Pranav starred in the Malayalam horror thriller Diés Iraé, directed by Rahul Sadasivan.Released on 31 October 2025 coinciding with halloween, Dies Irae garnered positive reviews from critics and audiences, with particular praise for Pranav's performance and the film's direction, screenplay and technical execution. Diés Iraé performed well at the box office, becoming the highest-grossing A-rated Malayalam film after Marco and one of the highest-grossing Malayalam films in 2025.

== Filmography ==
=== Actor ===
Key
| † | Denotes films that have not yet been released |

List of Pranav Mohanlal film credits
| Year | Title | Role | Notes | Ref. |
|---|---|---|---|---|
| 2002 | Onnaman | Child Ravisankar | Child artist | |
| 2003 | Punarjani | Appu | Kerala State Film Award for Best Child Artist | |
| 2009 | Sagar Alias Jacky Reloaded | Youngster | Uncredited appearance in the song "Sagar Alias Jackie" | |
| 2018 | Aadhi | Aditya Mohan "Aadhi" | Also singer-songwriter for the song "Gypsy Woman" | |
| 2019 | Irupathiyonnaam Noottaandu | Appu | | |
| 2021 | Marakkar: Arabikadalinte Simham | Young Mammali / Kunjali Marakkar IV | Extended Cameo | |
| 2022 | Hridayam | Arun Neelakandan | | |
| 2024 | Varshangalkku Shesham | Murali Vishwambaran | | |
| 2024 | Barroz | Anonymous | Cameo | |
| 2025 | L2: Empuraan | Teenage Khureshi-Ab'raam / Stephen Nedumpally | Cameo | |
| 2025 | Diés Iraé | Rohan Shankar | | |

=== As assistant director ===
| Year | Title | Director | Ref. |
|---|---|---|---|
| 2015 | Papanasam | Jeethu Joseph | |
| 2015 | Life of Josutty | Jeethu Joseph | |

== Awards ==
Awards and nominations received by Pranav Mohanlal
| Award | Year | Category | Nominated work | Result | Ref. |
|---|---|---|---|---|---|
| Kerala State Film Awards | 2002 | Kerala State Film Award for Best Child Artist | Punarjani | Won | |
| South Indian International Movie Awards | 2019 | Best Debut Actor | Aadhi | Won | |
| Kerala Film Critics Association Awards | 2019 | Best Debutant – Male | Aadhi | Won | |
