= Neethi (1971 film) =

- Poster
- Directed by: A. B. Raj
- Produced by: Prem Nawas
- Starring: Prem Nazir; Sheela; Thikkurissy Sukumaran Nair; Adoor Bhasi
- Production company: Azuma Productions
- Distributed by: Drishya
- Release date: 12 February 1971
- Country: India
- Language: Malayalam

Neethi (lit. 'Justice') is a 1971 Indian Malayalam-language film, directed by A. B. Raj and produced by Prem Nawas. The film stars Prem Nazir, Sheela, Thikkurissy Sukumaran Nair and Adoor Bhasi in lead roles.

== Cast ==
- Prem Nazir
- Sheela
- Thikkurissy Sukumaran Nair
- Adoor Bhasi
- Nellikode Bhaskaran
