= Punarjani =

- Home media cover
- Directed by: Major Ravi; Rajesh Amanakara
- Written by: Major Ravi; Rajesh Amanakara
- Produced by: P. L. Thenappan
- Starring: Pranav Mohanlal
- Cinematography: S. Sreeram
- Edited by: K. Thanigachalam
- Music by: Suresh Manimala; A. K. Heman (Score)
- Production company: Sri Rajlakshmi Films
- Distributed by: Sri Rajlakshmi Films
- Release date: 17 September 2003
- Running time: 160 minutes
- Country: India
- Language: Malayalam

Punarjani (transl. Reincarnation) is a 2003 Indian Malayalam-language drama film written and directed by Major Ravi and Rajesh Amanakara, starring Pranav Mohanlal. The film was produced by P. L. Thenappan under the production house Sri Rajlakshmi Films. Pranav won the Kerala State Film Award for Best Child Artist for his performance in the film.

== Plot ==
11-year-old Appu feels that his mother gives more love and attention to his younger brother. Though Appu argues with his mother to give his younger brother the same workload as he does, he is required to visit the temple in the early morning to sing the Sopanam, after which he provides milk to a tea shop and then goes to school.

His only friend is the Swamiji who sits next to the temple and tells him the stories of the famous "Naranathu Bhrandhan". Appu at times imagines himself as Naranathu Bhrandhan. Over time, he becomes convinced that his mother loves only his younger brother and he begins to consider his younger brother as an enemy.

One day Appu injures his younger brother. After seeing his brother bleeding and unconscious, Appu runs away from the village and is taken in by a child labour broker. Appu is employed under contract at a wealthy man's house. The man's children treat Appu poorly, which reminds Appu of his mother. He runs away and is cheated by another child labour broker.

Appu realises the importance of his family. One night, after dreaming about his mother, he leaves town and returns home, where he finds that she has died. Appu decides to stay at home and take care of his brother.

== Cast ==
- Pranav Mohanlal as Appu
- Urmila Unni
- Jagannathan
- Anila Sreekumar
- Master Vishnu Soman
- Major Ravi
- Arjun Ravi
- Rohith Dananjayan

== Soundtrack ==
The film features two songs composed by Dr. Suresh Manimala.

No.	Title	Writer(s)	Artist(s)	Length
1.	"Sritha Kamalaakucha"	Jayadevar	G. Venugopal, Yazin Nizar
2.	"Thaniye Parakkunna Pakshi"	V Madhusoodanan Nair	G. Venugopal

== Accolades ==
Ceremony	Category	Nominee	Result	Ref.
Kerala State Film Award	Best Child Artist	Master Pranav Mohanlal	Won	
Kerala State Film Award	Special Jury Mention	Master Vishnu	Won	
