= Malavika Nair (Malayalam actress) =

Indian actress

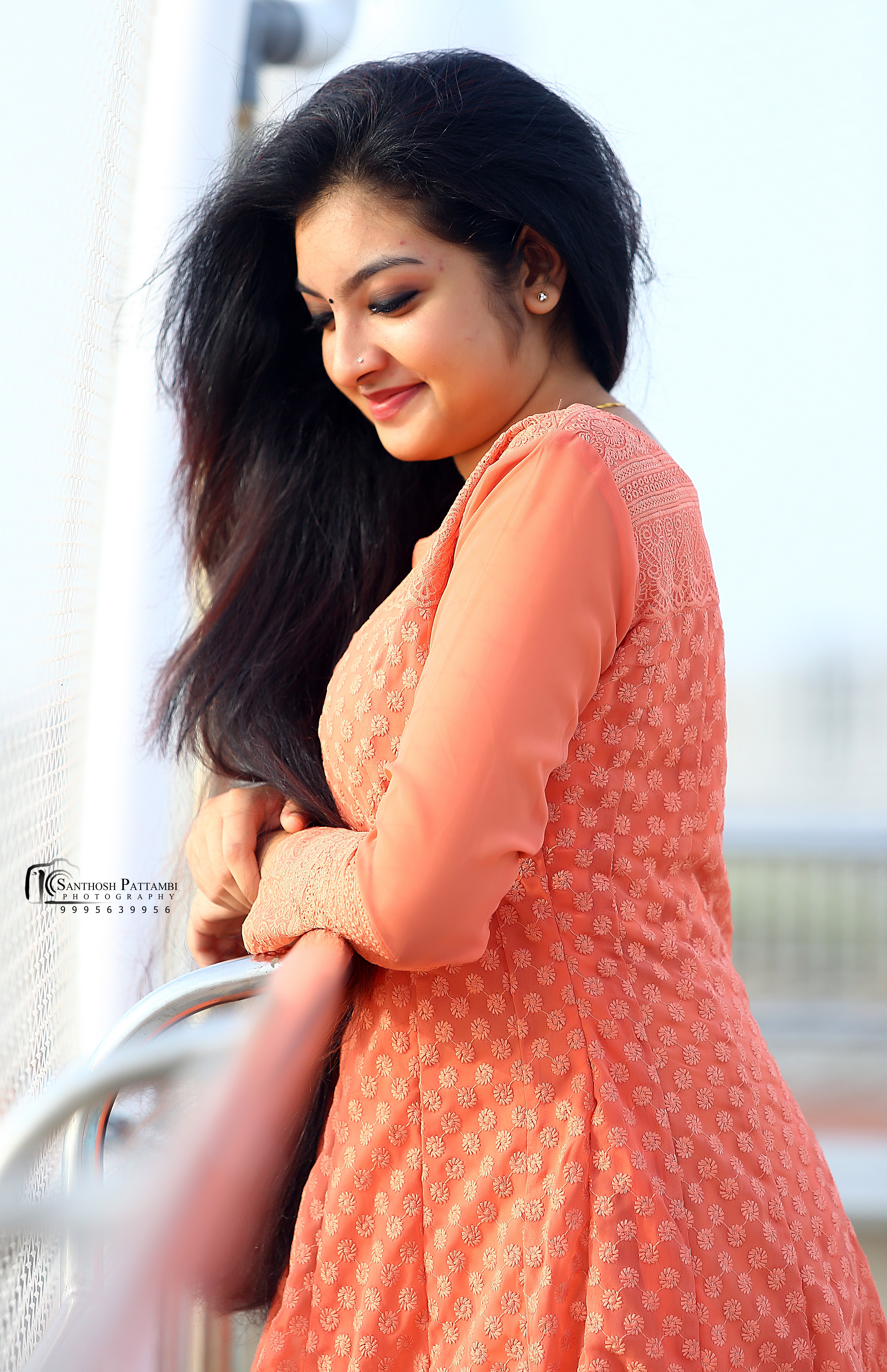
- Born: Malavika Nair; Thrissur, Kerala, India
- Occupation: Actress
- Years active: 2004–present
- Notable work: Karutha Pakshikal; Oomakkuyil Padumbol
- Awards: Kerala State Film Award for Best Child Artist

Malavika Nair is an Indian actress who predominantly appears in Malayalam films. She has appeared in more than 20 films, mostly as a child artist and is a two time recipient of the Kerala State Film Award for Best Child Artist, in 2006 and 2012.

== Personal life ==
Malavika Nair was born in Thrissur.

== Education ==
Malavika Nair graduated in 2022 in journalism and mass communication at St Teresa's College, Ernakulam.

== Career ==
Malavika began her career as a child actress in Malayalam television serials. Malayalam film director Kamal then cast her in his acclaimed film Karutha Pakshikal. This role won her the Kerala State Film Award. She has also acted in other Malayalam movies – Yes Your Honour, Maya Bazar, Orkkuka Vallappozhum, Shikkar, Penpattanam, Kandahar, Little Master, Vaadhyar, The Reporter, Oomakkuyil Padumbol, Naughty Professor, Ithra Mathram, and Omega.Exe.

== Awards ==
Malavika got her first Kerala State Film Award for Best Child Artist for her portrayal of a poor blind girl, Malli, in the movie Karutha Pakshikal released in 2006. She got her second Kerala State Film Award for Best Child Artist for her role as Reema in Oomakkuyil Padumbol.

== Filmography ==
Year	Film	Role	Language	Ref.
2006	Karutha Pakshikal	Malli	Malayalam	
2006	Yes Your Honour	Ravishankar's daughter	Malayalam	
2008	Maya Bazar	Rameshan's daughter	Malayalam	
2009	Orkkuka Vallappozhum	Paru	Malayalam	
2010	Shikkar	Sathyan's daughter	Malayalam	
2010	Penpattanam	Girija's daughter	Malayalam	
2010	Kandahar	Student	Malayalam	
2012	Oomakkuyil Padumbol	Reema	Malayalam	
2012	Naughty Professor	Karthika's daughter	Malayalam	
2012	Ithra Mathram	Anasuya	Malayalam	
2012	Vaadhyar	Reshmi	Malayalam	
2012	Little Master		Malayalam	
2012	Pankayam	Anjali's daughter	Malayalam	
2013	Omega.exe		Malayalam	
2015	The Reporter	Eby's sister	Malayalam	
2015	Akkaldameyile Pennu	Mariakutty	Malayalam	
2016	Daffadar	Aami	Malayalam	
2017	Georgettan's Pooram	Vava's wife	Malayalam	
2021	Bhramam	Vrinda	Malayalam	
2022	CBI 5: The Brain	Anuja	Malayalam	

== Television ==
Year	Serial	Channel	Notes
2004	Sahadharmini	Asianet	Acting debut
2005	Krishnakripa Sagaram	Amrita TV	as Radha
2007	Sreeguruvayoorappan	Surya TV	
2007	Ente Manasaputhri	Asianet	
2008	Sreekrishnaleela	Asianet	
2009	Devimahathmyam	Asianet	as Lord Muruga
2010	Kunjali Marakkar	Asianet	as Devootty
2016	Smart Show	Flowers TV	as Participant
2017	Vachakavum Pachakavum	Kairali TV	as Presenter
2017	Katturumbu	Flowers TV	as Mentor
2017	Yuva Film Awards	Asianet	as Dancer
2018	Emmini Balya Fan	Amrita TV	as Judge
2018-2019	Dance Kerala Dance	Zee Keralam	as Mentor
2019	New year promo	Kaumudy TV	as Herself
2020	Parayam Nedaam	Amrita TV	as Contestant
2021	Super 4 Juniors	Mazhavil Manorama	as Celebrity Guest
