= Sreerama Pattabhishekam =

Indian film by G.K. Ramu

Sreeraama Pattaabhishekam
- Directed by: G. K. Ramu
- Written by: Based on mythology Nagavally R. S. Kurup (dialogues)
- Screenplay by: Nagavally R. S. Kurup
- Produced by: P Subramaniam
- Starring: Prem Nazir; Vasanthi; Kaviyoor Ponnamma; Thikkurissy Sukumaran Nair; Prem Nawas
- Edited by: N. Gopalakrishnan
- Music by: Br. Lakshmanan
- Production company: Neela
- Distributed by: Neela
- Release date: 11 September 1962
- Country: India
- Language: Malayalam

Sreeraama Pattaabhishekam is a 1962 Indian Malayalam-language film, directed by G. K. Ramu and produced by P. Subramaniam. The film stars Prem Nazir, Vasanthi, Kaviyoor Ponnamma, Thikkurissy Sukumaran Nair and Prem Nawas and features a musical score by Br. Lakshmanan. It was dubbed into Hindi as Prabhu Jai Shri Ram.

== Cast ==
- Prem Nazir as Sree Raman
- Vasanthi as Seetha/Ahalya
- Kaviyoor Ponnamma as Mandodari
- Thikkurissy Sukumaran Nair as Dasaradhan
- Prem Nawas as Lakshmanan
- GK Pillai as Vishwamithran
- Miss Kumari as Kaikeyi
- K. V. Shanthi as Surpanakha/Kamavalli
- T. K. Balachandran as Bharathan
- Aranmula Ponnamma as Kausalya
- Jose Prakash as Janakaraja
- Kaduvakulam Antony as Badan
- Kottarakkara Sreedharan Nair as Ravanan
- Vanchiyoor Radha as Mallika
- Adoor Pankajam as Manthara
- Hari as Shatrughnan
- S. P. Pillai as Vaidyar
- Sukumari dance appearance in song sequence

== Soundtrack ==
The music was composed by Br. Lakshmanan and lyrics were written by Thirunayinaarkurichi Madhavan Nair. Slokas taken from Thunchathu Ezhuthachan's Adhyathmaramayanam were also taken to the film.

No.	Song	Singers	Lyrics	Length (m:ss)
1	"Chollu Sakhi"	P. Susheela	Thirunayinaarkurichi Madhavan Nair	
2	"Lankesha"	P. Leela, Soolamangalam Rajalakshmi	Thirunayinaarkurichi Madhavan Nair	
3	"Mama Tharuni"	Kamukara	Thirunayinaarkurichi Madhavan Nair	
4	"Mohini Njaan"	S. Janaki	Thirunayinaarkurichi Madhavan Nair	
5	"Naaduvaazhuvaan"	K. J. Yesudas, P. Susheela, Kamukara, A. P. Komala, Chorus	Thirunayinaarkurichi Madhavan Nair	
6	"Ninne Piriyukil"	P. B. Sreenivas	Thirunayinaarkurichi Madhavan Nair	
7	"Parannu Parannu"	P. Susheela, Kamukara	Thirunayinaarkurichi Madhavan Nair	
8	"Pokunnitha"	P. B. Sreenivas, Chorus	Thirunayinaarkurichi Madhavan Nair	
9	"Ponnittu Porulittu"	P. Susheela, Kamukara	Thirunayinaarkurichi Madhavan Nair, Thunchathezhuthachan	
10	"Pookkaatha Kaadukale" (Theyyare)	K. J. Yesudas, Chorus	Thirunayinaarkurichi Madhavan Nair	
11	"Raajaadhi Raaja"	A. P. Komala, Jikki, Vaidehi	Thirunayinaarkurichi Madhavan Nair	
12	"Raamaraama Seetha"	K. J. Yesudas, Chorus	Thirunayinaarkurichi Madhavan Nair	
13	"Sooryavamshathin"	P. Leela, Kamukara	Thirunayinaarkurichi Madhavan Nair	
14	"Thaathan Nee Mathavu"	P. B. Sreenivas	Thirunayinaarkurichi Madhavan Nair	
15	"Vatsa Soumithre"	Kamukara	Thunchathezhuthachan	
