= Subaidha =

- Directed by: M. S. Mani
- Written by: M. Hussain (dialogues)
- Screenplay by: M. Hussain
- Produced by: H. H. Ebrahim
- Starring: Madhu; Ambika; Prem Nawas; Bahadoor
- Cinematography: U. Rajagopal
- Edited by: M. S. Mani
- Music by: M. S. Baburaj
- Production company: Kalalaya
- Distributed by: Kalalaya
- Release date: 3 February 1965
- Country: India
- Language: Malayalam

Subaidha is a 1965 Indian Malayalam film, directed by M. S. Mani and produced by H. H. Ebrahim. The film stars Madhu, Ambika, Prem Nawas and Bahadoor in the lead roles. The film had musical score by M. S. Baburaj.

== Plot ==
It tells the story of Subaidha, a poor village girl from Northern Kerala. Her father died when she was an infant. Ahmed is her mother's nephew. He completes MBBS and returns from Madras. Ahmed goes to Subaida's house to meet his ailing aunt. Ahmed decides to marry Subaida and later marries her with the blessings of both their families. On the way back home, Ahmed meets an accident and becomes unconscious. Ahmed's friend Mammu sits by his bed looking after him during that night. Ahmed wakes up after midnight and meets his wife. After their first night, he dies. Only Mammu knows about the meeting of Ahmed with Subaida. Subaida gets pregnant and her suspicious in-laws expel her and send her back home. Her mother dies on hearing the news of her pregnancy and Subaida does not get a chance to tell her the truth. She later gives birth to a baby girl and leaves the child near the tomb of Ahmed. Mammu finds the baby and hands her over to a childless couple. Subaida joins that family as a nanny. Her daughter gets college education. She falls in love with her classmate and their marriage is fixed. The boy happens to be the son of Ahmed's elder brother. During the marriage, it is revealed that the girl is an orphan and the marriage gets cancelled. A few days later, Mammu reveals the secret of Subaida's pregnancy and the story ends happily with the marriage.

== Cast ==
- Madhu as Ahmed
- Ambika as Subaida
- Prem Nawas as Salim
- Bahadoor as Mammu
- Devaki
- Haji Abdul Rahman
- Meena as Ayisha
- Nilambur Ayisha
- Philomina as Raziya
- Santo Krishnan
- Suprabha
- Saroja
- Sachu (Tamil actress)
- Shukkoor
- S.A Fareed
- Ravi

== Soundtrack ==
The music was composed by M. S. Baburaj and lyrics were written by P. Bhaskaran.

No.	Song	Singers	Lyrics	Length (m:ss)
1	"Ee Chiriyum Chiriyalla"	L. R. Eeswari, M. S. Baburaj, L. R. Anjali, Mehboob	P. Bhaskaran	
2	"Ente Valayitta"	P. Susheela	P. Bhaskaran	
3	"Kollaan Nadakkana"	L. R. Anjali, Mehboob	P. Bhaskaran	
4	"La Ilaaha"	P. Susheela, Jikki	P. Bhaskaran	
5	"Manimalayaattin"	K. J. Yesudas, S. Janaki	P. Bhaskaran	
6	"Oru Kudukka Ponnutharaam"	L. R. Eeswari, L. R. Anjali	P. Bhaskaran	
7	"Ponnaaram Chollaathe"	Latha Raju, L. R. Anjali	P. Bhaskaran	
8	"Pottithakarnna"	M. S. Baburaj	P. Bhaskaran	
