= Onnaman =

- Directed by: Thampi Kannanthanam
- Written by: Thampi Kannanthanam
- Produced by: A. V. Govindhankutty
- Starring: Mohanlal; N. F. Varghese; Biju Menon; Ramya Krishnan
- Cinematography: Anil Gopinath
- Edited by: A. Sreekar Prasad
- Music by: S. P. Venkatesh
- Production company: GK Film International
- Release date: 2002
- Running time: 168 minutes
- Country: India
- Language: Malayalam

Onnaman (transl. Topper) is a 2002 Indian Malayalam-language action drama film written and directed by Thampi Kannanthanam, starring Mohanlal, N. F. Varghese, Biju Menon, and Ramya Krishnan. The film features an original soundtrack composed by S. P. Venkatesh. Mohanlal's son, Pranav, makes a guest appearance in the film.

== Plot ==
Ravishanker, comes under the patronage of Salim Bhai, a self-styled messiah of the masses and a don. When Ravishankar grows up, he becomes an adviser to Salim Bhai. With the help of his gang of young friends, Ravishankar soon emerges as a leader of the poor and the oppressed. The 'bad' guys led by Gulab Chand Shah, resent him and do everything possible to eliminate Ravishankar.

== Cast ==
- Mohanlal as Ravishankar (Ravi)
  - Pranav Mohanlal as Young Ravi
- N. F. Varghese as Salim Bhai
- Biju Menon as ACP Vishnu S. Pillai
- Ramya Krishnan as District Collector Kamala IAS, Ravi's Love Interest
- Kavya Madhavan as Raziya, Bhai's Daughter
- Lalu Alex as R.D.O Harishankar (Hari), Ravi's Elder Brother
- Jagathy Sreekumar as Vasu, Ravi's Friend (Cameo)
- Jagadish as Krishnakumar / Krishnan, Ravi's Friend
- Vijayakumar as Balan, Ravi's Friend
- Tej Sapru as Gulab Chand Shah
- Shehzad Khan as City Police Commissioner Karunakaran
- Hemanth Ravan as CI Martin
- Narendra Prasad as Sukumaran Menon, Ravi's Father
- Jayabharathi as Parvathy, Ravi's Mother
- Aswathi Menon as Radha, Ravi's Younger Sister
- Dr. Sharmila as Lakshmi, Ravi's Sister-in-Law and Hari's wife
- Suresh Krishna as Remanik, Gulab Chand Shah's Son
- Arun Ghosh as Navin, Gulab Chand Shah's Son
- Baburaj as Prathapan, Gulab Chand Shah's Henchman
- P. Sreekumar as Shekharankutty, Home Minister
- Vinayakan as Patrick, Ravi's Friend
- Major Ravi as ACP Prabhakaran
- Tini Tom as S.I. Chandrappan
- Ravi Menon as Gopalan Mesthiri, Balan's Father
- Saju Kodiyan as Ajayan, Ravi's Friend
- Fathima Babu as Deepa Martin
- Chali Pala as A. P. P. Tharakan
- James Stalin as Rafi
- Abu Salim as Karthikeyan
- Kollam Ajith as Najeeb, Gulab Chand Shah's Henchman
- Ponnamma Babu as Sainaba's Mother
- Rajesh Rajan
- Manuraj
- Harisree Martin
- Haneef Kumaranellur
- Deepika Mohan

== Soundtrack ==
The songs of this film were composed by S. P. Venkatesh.

Track	Song title	Singer(s)	Lyrics
1	"Kadukedu"	M. G. Sreekumar	Gireesh Puthenchery
2	"Maanathe Thudiyunarum"	K. J. Yesudas, Gayathri Asokan	Gireesh Puthenchery
3	"Maanathe Thudiyunarum"	K. J. Yesudas	Gireesh Puthenchery
4	"Mizhiyithalil"	K. J. Yesudas, S. Janaki	Gireesh Puthenchery
5	"Piranna Mannil"	M. G. Sreekumar, Sujatha Mohan, Alex Paul	Gireesh Puthenchery
6	"Poove Vaa"	Biju Narayanan	Gireesh Puthenchery
7	"Vattalla Vattiyilla"	K. S. Chithra, P. Jayachandran	Gireesh Puthenchery
