= Ennu Swantham Sreedharan =

- Directed by: Siddik Paravoor
- Written by: Siddik Paravoor
- Story by: Siddik Paravoor
- Produced by: Suresh Nellikode
- Starring: Nirmala Kannan, Suresh Nellikode, Rajitha Santhosh, Sachin Roy, Abhinand
- Cinematography: Siddik Paravoor
- Edited by: Siddik Paravoor
- Music by: MS Baburaj, Raza
- Production company: Memories Creations
- Distributed by: Memory Creations
- Release date: 1 June 2023
- Running time: 90 minutes
- Country: India
- Language: Malayalam
- Budget: est. ₹7 Million

Ennu Swantham Sreedharan (Yours Truly, Sreedharan) is a 2023 Indian Malayalam-language drama film written and directed by Siddik Paravoor. The film stars Nirmala Kannan, Suresh Nellikode, Rajitha Santhosh, Sachin Roy, Abhinand, Nilambur Ayisha, Shihabuddin Poithumkadavu, Nadish, Mishal, Vaibhav Amarnath, Harsha Arun, Hima Ganga, Arya, Sadhika, Dr Shali Ashok, Vinod Parppidam, KN Yasodharan, Sulochana, Abdul Latheef, Sajina Alex.

The film was screened in Delhi and was well received for accurately depicting the story of a Muslim woman bringing up three Hindu kids.

The story was falsely depicted in The Kerala Story (2023).
