= Jayashree Sivadhas =

Indian actress

- Born: Jayashree Sivadhas; Thrissur, Kerala, India
- Occupation: Actress
- Years active: 2007–present
- Notable work: Action Hero Biju; Idukki Gold; Bhramaram; Pradhama Drishtiya Kuttakkar
- Awards: Kerala State Film Award for Best Child Artist; Kerala Film Critics Award 2007 for Best Child Artist

Jayashree Sivadhas is an Indian actress who predominantly appears in Malayalam cinema. She began her career as a child artist with Chakkaramuthu (2006) and won the Kerala State Film Award and Film Critics Award for Best Child Artist in 2007 for her performance in Oridathoru Puzhayundu.

She gained wider recognition for her appearance in the song sequence "Annarakkanna Va" from the Mohanlal-starrer Bhramaram (2009). After transitioning from child roles to character roles, she has appeared in several notable films, including Idukki Gold (2013), Action Hero Biju (2016), Nithyharitha Nayakan, 2018: Everyone is a Hero (2023), Idiyan Chandhu (2024), and Pradhama Drishtiya Kuttakkar (2026).

== Early Life and Education ==
Jayashree Sivadhas was born in Thrissur district, Kerala. She is the daughter of Sivadas and Swapna, and has a younger brother, Jayakrishnan.

She completed her lower primary education at Holy Family Convent School, Mannuthy, high school at St. Clare's Higher Secondary School, Thrissur, and higher secondary education at Vivekodayam Boys Higher Secondary School, Thrissur. She graduated with a Bachelor of Commerce degree from Christ College, Irinjalakuda, and later completed her Certified Management Accountant (CMA - US) qualification.

A trained classical dancer, Jayashree began learning dance during early childhood and has regularly participated in the District and State School Youth Festivals in categories including Mohiniyattam, folk dance, monoact, drama, and Thiruvathirakali.

== Career ==
Jayashree began her career in the Malayalam film industry as a child artist, portraying the younger version of Kavya Madhavan in Chakkaramuthu (2006). She gained widespread recognition for her role as Ambili in the sensational song sequence "Annarakkanna Va" from Bhramaram (2009).

She received critical acclaim for her early performances, winning the Kerala State Film Award for Best Child Artist and the Kerala Film Critics Association Award for Best Child Artist in 2007 for Oridathoru Puzhayundu.

Over the subsequent years, she established herself as a familiar face in Malayalam cinema through diverse projects. Her filmography expanded with prominent roles such as Jalaja in the comedy-drama Idukki Gold (2013), and a student police cadet in the action-comedy Action Hero Biju (2016), followed by Nithyaharitha Nayakan (2018).

Continuing her active presence in the 2020s, she has appeared in films including 2018: Everyone is a Hero (2023), Idiyan Chandhu (2024), Turkish Tharkkam (2024), Sahasam (2025), and Prathama Drishtya Kuttakkar (2026).

Alongside acting, Jayashree has developed an interest in direction. She directed the music video Rithwa in 2020 and later worked as an assistant director to Abrid Shine on the films Mahaveeryar (2022).

== Awards ==
Jayashree Sivadhas's breakthrough came early in her career when her performance as a child artist was recognised at the state level. She won the prestigious Kerala State Film Award for Best Child Artist and the Kerala Film Critics Association Award for Best Child Artist in 2007 for Oridathoru Puzhayundu.

Expanding her artistic reach beyond acting, she won the Best Director award at the Lohithadas International Film Festival in 2020 for her music video Rithwa.

== Filmography ==
| Year | Film | Role | Language | Ref. |
|---|---|---|---|---|
| 2006 | Chakkaramuthu | Young Anitha | Malayalam | |
| 2008 | Oridathoru Puzhayundu | Sumangala | Malayalam | |
| 2008 | Minnaminnikoottam | Young Charulatha | Malayalam | |
| 2009 | Bhramaram | Ambili | Malayalam | |
| 2010 | Pulliman | Radha's Sister | Malayalam | |
| 2011 | Bhakthajanangalude Sradhakku | Sumangala's daughter | Malayalam | |
| 2011 | Doctor Love | Young Sreekutty | Malayalam | |
| 2012 | Asuravithu | Sheikh's daughter | Malayalam | |
| 2012 | Ezham Suryan | | Malayalam | |
| 2013 | Idukki Gold | Jalaja | Malayalam | |
| 2013 | Varsham | Omana's Daughter | Malayalam | |
| 2013 | Venmegam | Pooja | Tamil | |
| 2016 | Action Hero Biju | SPC cadet leader | Malayalam | |
| 2018 | Nithyaharitha Nayakan | Nithya | Malayalam | |
| 2019 | 1948 Kalam Paranjathu (2019) | | Malayalam | |
| 2021 | Djibouti | Kunjumol | Malayalam | |
| 2023 | 2018 - Everyone is a Hero | Meera | Malayalam | |
| 2024 | Idiyan Chandhu | Teena Kunjachan | Malayalam | |
| 2024 | Chandranum Policeum | Ashwathy | Malayalam | |
| 2024 | Turkish Tharkkam | Minha | Malayalam | |
| 2025 | Sahasam | Priya | Malayalam | |
| 2026 | Pradhama Drishtiya Kuttakkar | Shilpa | Malayalam | |
