= Palunku =

- Directed by: Blessy
- Written by: Blessy
- Produced by: Houli Pottoor
- Starring: Mammootty; Lakshmi Sharma; Nazriya Nazim; Nivedita; Jagathy Sreekumar; Kottayam Santha
- Cinematography: Santosh Thundiyil
- Edited by: Raja Mohammed
- Music by: Mohan Sithara
- Production company: Dream Team Productions
- Release date: 22 December 2006
- Running time: 136 minutes
- Country: India
- Language: Malayalam

Palunku (transl. Crystal) is a 2006 Malayalam-language drama film written and directed by Blessy. It stars Mammootty in the lead role with Nazriya Nazim making her on-screen debut, along with Lakshmi Sharma, Baby Nivedita, Kottayam Santha, and Jagathy Sreekumar playing other pivotal roles.

The film was mainly shot at various locations in Muvattupuzha and Thodupuzha. It was released on 22 December 2006. Mammootty won the Best Actor award for the film at the Kerala Film Critics Awards.

== Cast ==
- Mammootty as Monichan
- Lakshmi Sharma as Susamma
- Nazriya Nazim as Geethu Monichan
- Baby Nivedita as Neethu Monichan
- Jagathy Sreekumar as Soman Pillai
- Nedumudi Venu as Teacher
- Thampi Antony as Prof. Sukumaran Nair
- Santhakumari as Lalitha
- Tony Sigimon as Alexander
- Kottayam Santha as Ammayi
- Subair as Police Officer
- Mahima
- Vishnu Unnikrishnan as Asalappan

== Critical reception ==
A review by The Hindu said, "Palunku is a commendable attempt at portraying the changing attitude of the modern Malayali through the story of a small family of a husband, wife, and two children. The family succumbs to the temptations of a modern lifestyle and gets down to making money. The movie realistically depicts how the craze for modernity and consumerist culture affects family values". A review by Deccan Herald wrote "performances by Mammootty as Monichan, new girl Lakshmi Sharma as Susamma, the children Nazriya Nazim as Geethu and Niveditha as Neethu and Jagathy Sreekumar as Soman Pillai this technically superb film is a must watch this weekend".

== Soundtrack ==
The film's soundtrack was composed by Mohan Sithara, with lyrics penned by Kaithapram, Sarath Vayalar, and D. Vinayachandran.

#	Song	Singers
1	Ettu Vatta Kettum	G. Venugopal, Anwar Sadath
2	Maanathe Velli Vithaanicha Kottaaram	K. J. Yesudas
3	Neru Parayanam	Madhu Balakrishnan, Anu V. Kadammanitta
4	Neru Parayanam [V2]	Anu V. Kadammanitta
5	Pottu Thotta	P. Jayachandran, Jassie Gift, Sheela Mani
6	Theme Song	-
