= Kerala State Film Award for Best Child Artist =

Indian film award

Kerala State Film Award Best Child Artist
- State award for contributions to Malayalam cinema
- Awarded for: Best performance by a child artist
- Sponsored by: Kerala State Chalachitra Academy
- First award: 1969
- Final award: 2020
- Most recent winner: Niranjan S Aravya Sharma

Highlights
- Total awarded: 65
- First winner: Pramod; Sumathi

The Kerala State Film Award for Best Child Artist is an award, begun in 1969, presented annually at the Kerala State Film Awards of India for the best performance by a child actor in the Malayalam cinema. Until 1997, the awards were managed directly by the Department of Cultural Affairs of the Government of Kerala. Since 1998, the awards have been controlled by the Kerala State Chalachitra Academy, an autonomous, non-profit institution functioning under the Department of Cultural Affairs.

== Winners ==
Indicates a joint award for both male and female

Year	Recipient(s)	Film	Ref.
1969	Pramod	Mooladhanam	
1969	Sumathi	Nadhi	
1970	Sridevi	Poompatta	
1971	Vijayakumar		
1971	Sobha		
1972	Sathyajith	Theertha Yathra	
1972	Sumathi		
1973	Sathyajith		
1974	Raghu	Rajahamsam	
1975	Raghu	Prayanam, Swami Ayyappan	
1976	Jayashanthi	Lakshmi Vijayam	
1977	Sumathi	Sankhupushpam	
1978	Manohar	Rathinirvedam	
1979	Sujith	Vadaka Veedu	
1980	Aravind	Oppol	
1981	Sudha	Ilakkangal	
1982	Suresh	Padayottam, Sahyante Makan	
1983	Shalini	Ente Mamattikkuttiyammakku	
1984	Prashob	Aalkkoottathil Thaniye	
1985	Vimal	Anubandham	
1986	Anoop	Ennennum Kannettante	
1986	Geethu Mohandas	Onnu Muthal Poojyam Vare	
1987	Sonia	Nombarathipoovu	
1988	Baby Chaithanya	Ormayilennum	
1989	Vineeth Kumar	Oru Vadakkan Veeragatha	
1990	Shamili	Malootty	
1991	Santhosh Antony	Kadavu	
1992	Siddharth Lama	Yoddha	
1992	Badusha	Pappayude Swantham Appoos	
1993	Seena Antony	Akashadoothu, Sopanam	
1994	Praseeda	Swaham	
1995	Nithin K. David	Ormakalundayirikkanam	
1995	Aarati Ghanashyam	Mini	
1996	Kumar	Deshadanam	
1997	Shilpa	Janmadinam	
1998	Mohan Philip	Kochu Kochu Mohangal	
1998	Hency	Garshom	
1999	Munna Salam	Kuruthipookkal	
2000	Ashwin Thampi	Madhuranombarakattu	
2000	Manjima	Madhuranombarakattu	
2001	Krishna	Saree	
2002	Pranav Mohanlal	Punarjani	
2003	Kalidas Jayaram	Ente Veedu Appuvinteyum	
2004	Master Yash	Kaazhcha	
2004	Sanusha	Kaazhcha, Soumyam	
2005	Neeraja	Kane Madanguka	
2006	Mani	Photographer	
2006	Malavika Nair	Karutha Pakshikal	
2007	Jayashree Sivadhas	Oridathoru Puzhayundu	
2008	Niveda Thomas	Veruthe Oru Bharya	
2009	Niveditha	Bhramaram	
2010	Krishna Padmakumar	Janaki	
2011	Malavika Nair	Oomakkuyil Padumbol	
2012	Minon	101 Chodyangal	
2012	Vyjayanthi	Manjadikuru	
2013	Sanoop Santhosh	Philips and the Monkey Pen	
2013	Anikha	5 Sundarikal	
2014	Adwaith	Ankuram	
2014	Anna Fathima	2 Penkuttikal	
2015	Gourav Menon	Ben	
2015	Janaki Menon	Maalgudi Days	
2016	Chethan Jayalal	Guppy	
2016	Abeni Aadhi	Kochavva Paulo Ayyappa Coelho	
2017	Abhinand	Swanam	
2017	Nakshatra	Rakshadhikari Baiju Oppu	
2018	Master Ridhun	Appuvinte Sathyanweshanam	
2018	Abeni Aadhi	Panth	
2019	Pranav	Biriyaani	
2019	Catherine	Nani	
2020	Niranjan S.	Kasiminte Kadal	
2020	Aravya Sharma	Pyali	
2021	Adithyan	Niraye Thathakalulla Maram	
2021	Sneha Anu	Thala	
2022	Davinchi Santhosh	Pallotty 90s Kid	
2022	Thanmaya Sol A.	Vazhakku	
2023	Avirth Menon	Pachuvum Athbutha Vilakkum	
2023	Thennal Abhilash	Sesham Mike-il Fathima	
2024	No Award		
