= Kalavoor Ravikumar =

Indian author, screenwriter and film director

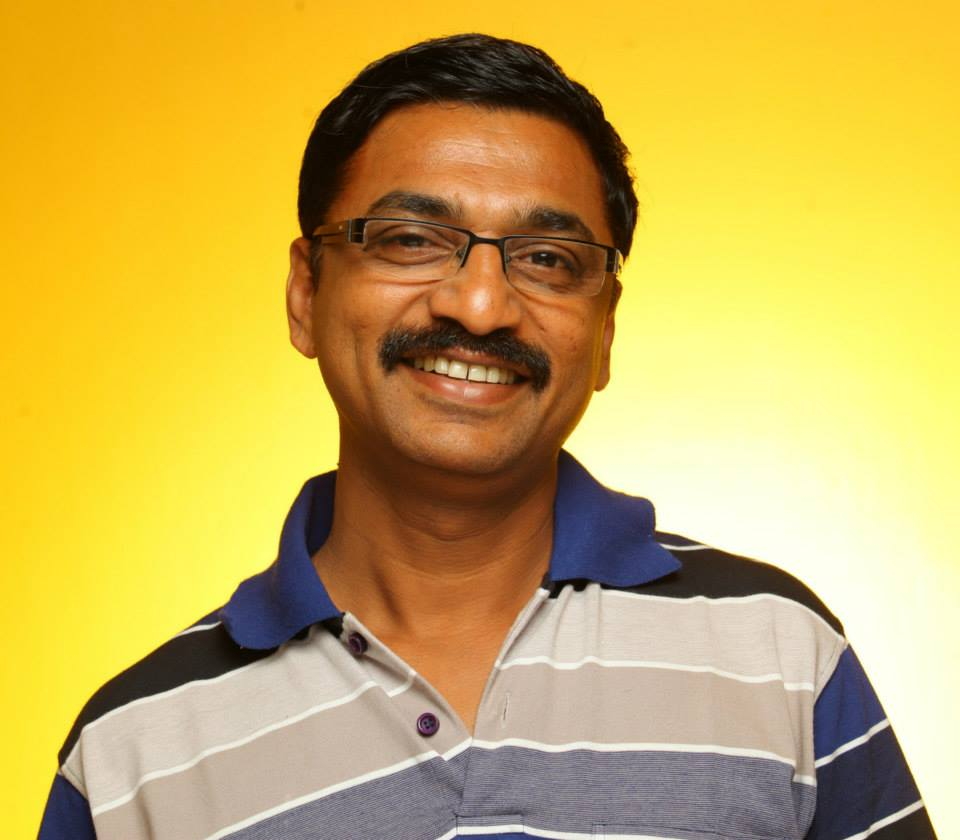
- Born: Kalavoor, Alappuzha, Kerala, India
- Occupations: Writer, film director
- Years active: 1991 - Present
- Children: Suryachandana, Nilachandana

Kalavoor Ravikumar is an Indian author, screenwriter and film director who works in the Malayalam film and literature.

== Early life and family ==
He joined Kerala Kaumudi daily after the studies and started his professional career as a journalist. Later on he joined Kalakaumudi as Sub Editor and Program selection committee member in Jeevan TV.

== Film career ==
Ravikumar started his film career as a screenwriter with the movie Ottayal Pattalam in 1991. He made his Directorial debut in 2008 with Oridathoru Puzhayundu.

Ravikumar moved legally against the makers of the 2018 film Mohanlal as per the copyright act, Ravikumar claims that the movie was based on his collection of stories titled ‘Mohanlaline Enikipol Bhayankara Pediyanu’, and had already lodged a complaint with Film Employees Federation of Kerala (FEFKA) before the shooting of the film commenced.

== Filmography ==
Year	Film	Credited as	
Year	Film	Director	Screenwriter
1991	Ottayal Pattalam		Yes
2001	Ishtam		Yes
2002	Nammal		Yes
2003	Choonda		Yes
2003	Njan Salperu Ramankutty		Yes
2004	Manju Poloru Penkutty		Yes
2007	Goal		Yes
2008	Oridathoru Puzhayundu	Yes	
2009	Swa. Le.		Yes
2010	Aagathan		Yes
2012	Navagatharkku Sagatham		Yes
2012	Father's Day	Yes	Yes
2012	101 Weddings		Yes
2016	Kuttikalundu Sookshikkuka	Yes	Yes
2024	Barroz		Yes

== Literary works ==
=== Novels ===
- Oral Jadha
- Hridayajalakam
- Nakshathrangalude Album
- Dulquarum Malakhamarum

=== Short story collections ===
- P. Krishnapillayude Mobile Number
- V.Essum Penkuttikalum
- Mohan Laline Enikippol Bhayankara Pediyanu
- Pokkuveyil Chuvappu

=== Children's literature ===
- Abduvinte Meenukal (Novel)
- Chinese Boy (Short stories; published by Bala Sahitya Institute)

== Awards and honours ==
- Kerala State Institute of Children's Literature's Bala Sahitya Award for Best Novel - Chinese Boy
- Abu Dhabi Sakthi Award for Children's Literature (2019) - Chinese Boy
