= Karutha Pakshikal =

- Movie Poster
- Directed by: Kamal
- Written by: Kamal
- Produced by: K. V. Kaladharan; GV productions
- Starring: Mammootty; Meena; Padmapriya; Jagathy Sreekumar
- Cinematography: P. Sukumar
- Edited by: Rajagopal
- Music by: Mohan Sitara
- Release date: 17 November 2006
- Running time: 2hrs
- Country: India
- Language: Malayalam

Karutha Pakshikal (English: Black Birds) is a 2006 Indian Malayalam-language family drama film written and directed by Kamal. It stars Mammootty, Meena, and Padmapriya.

== Plot ==
Widower Murugan moves to Kerala with his three children and irons clothes to make a living. While dealing with daily issues, he also aims to fund the operation of his child who is visually impaired. They come across Suvarna who belongs to a rich household and is living the last days of her life, as she is suffering from a disease. She bonds with the family, especially the visually impaired daughter of Murugan, and gives her consent to have her eyes donated to the child after her imminent death. The family, especially the children are caught in a dilemma, whether to wish for her death (as that would mean eyes for the child) or her recovery. Murugan advises them to pray for her good health. Later, she dies but her busy husband and family does not care about her pledge to donate eyes and she is cremated without eye donation procedures. Initially saddened by this turn of events, Murugan and the family goes back to their usual life with their positive outlook amidst poverty.

== Cast ==
- Mammootty as Murugan
- Meena as Suvarna
- Padmapriya as Poongodi
- Malavika Nair as Malli, Murugan's daughter
- Jagathy Sreekumar as Wariarettan
- Rajesh Hebbar as Sathish
- V. K. Sreeraman as Dr. Pai
- Salim Kumar as Shanmughan
- T. G. Ravi as Muthuvannan
- Anoop Chandran
- Narayanankutty as Schoolmaster
- Lishoy as Manichan
- Reshmi Boban
- Merlin Charles as PC Saramma

== Soundtrack ==
The film's soundtrack was composed by Mohan Sithara, with lyrics penned by Sarath Vayalar.

#	Song	Singers	Raga
1	"Mazhayil"	Manjari	Vrindavana Saranga
2	"Venmukiletho Kaattin Kayyil"	P. Jayachandran	—
3	"Venmukiletho Kaattin Kayyil (F)"	Sheela Mani	—

== Awards ==
National Film Awards

- 2006 National Film Award for Best Film on Family Welfare

Kerala State Film Awards

- 2006 Kerala State Film Award for Second Best Actress - Padmapriya
- 2006 Kerala State Film Award for Best Child Artist - Baby Malavika

Kerala Film Critics Association Awards

- 2006 Kerala Film Critics Association Awards for Best Actor - Mammootty

Filmfare Awards South

- 2006 Filmfare Award for Best Actor – Malayalam - Mammootty
- 2006 Filmfare Award for Best Actress – Malayalam - Padmapriya

Asianet Film Awards

- 2006 Best Actress - Padmapriya
- 2006 Best Child Artist - Baby Malavika
- 2006 Best Sound Recordist - Anoop, Vinod
