= Oomakkuyil Padumbol =

- Directed by: Siddique Chennamangalloor
- Written by: Siddique Chennamangalloor
- Produced by: Siddique Chennamangalloor
- Starring: Malavika Nair; Akash Roshan; Shankar; Sangeetha Rajendran; Dhanraj
- Cinematography: Noushad Shereef
- Edited by: Nishad Yousef
- Music by: M. R. Rison
- Production company: Century Visual Media
- Distributed by: Sreekrishna Films
- Release date: 17 February 2012
- Country: India
- Language: Malayalam

Oomakkuyil Padumbol (transl. When the Mute Nightingale Sings) is a 2012 Indian Malayalam-language children's film produced and directed by Siddique Chennamangalloor, starring Malavika Nair, Akash Roshan, Shankar and Sangeetha Rajendran.

== Plot ==
The story is about Reema (Malavika Nair), a young Muslim schoolgirl in Malabar, who loved Malayalam and poetry. The film is about her mental trauma once she was moved to an English medium school by her parents, for their social status.

== Cast ==
- Malavika Nair as Rima Mansoor
- Akash Roshan as Roshan
- Shankar as Doctor
- Sangita Rajendran as Zeenath/Rima's mother
- Nilambur Ayisha as Valiyumma/Rima's granmothermother
- Dhanraj as Rahman
- Dolly as Geetha

== Awards ==
Kerala State Film Awards

- Nilambur Aisha - Second Best Actress
- Malavika Nair - Best Child Artist

Kerala Film Critics Awards

- Special Jury Prize: Oomakkuyil Padumbol
- Best Debutant Director: Siddique Chendamangalloor
- Best Child Artist – Female: Malavika Nair
- Best Playback Singer – Male: Vidhu Prathap
