= Plachimada Coca-Cola struggle =

Environmental protests in Kerala, India

The Plachimada Coca-Cola struggle is a series of protests that led to permanent closure the Coca-Cola factory in the village of Plachimada, Palakkad District, Kerala, India in the early 2000s. Villagers noted that soon after the factory opened, their wells started to run dry and the available water turned contaminated and toxic. Soon, waste from the factory was passed off to farmers in the area as fertiliser. The controversy became "one of the most studied corporate controversies" in recent times.

== History of Plachimada Plant ==
The Hindustan Coca-Cola Beverage (HCCB) is an Indian bottling entity of The Coca-Cola. Its Plachimada plant was launched and became operational in 2000. The 34.64 acres of HCCB factory produced beverages Limca, Fanta, Thums Up, Sprite, Kinley and Maaza etc.

The factory was closed in 2004 following local agitations, though it briefly opened for a week in 2005. In July 2017, Hindustan Coca-Cola Beverages informed the Supreme Court that it does not intend to commence manufacturing operations at the plant located at Plachimada (Palakkad district) in Kerala. The Bench comprising Justice Rohinton Fali Nariman and Justice Sanjay Kishan Kaul made a note of the statement and in its order dated 13 July 2017, stated, “We record the aforesaid statement and, therefore, dispose of these appeals as being become infructuous in terms of the signed order.”

The court was hearing seven civil appeals on the issue. The petitioners’ counsels decided not to oppose the issue.

In June 2021, during the Covid-19 pandemic, the factory was converted into a Covid First Line treatment center (CFLTC).

== History of Plachimada Struggle ==
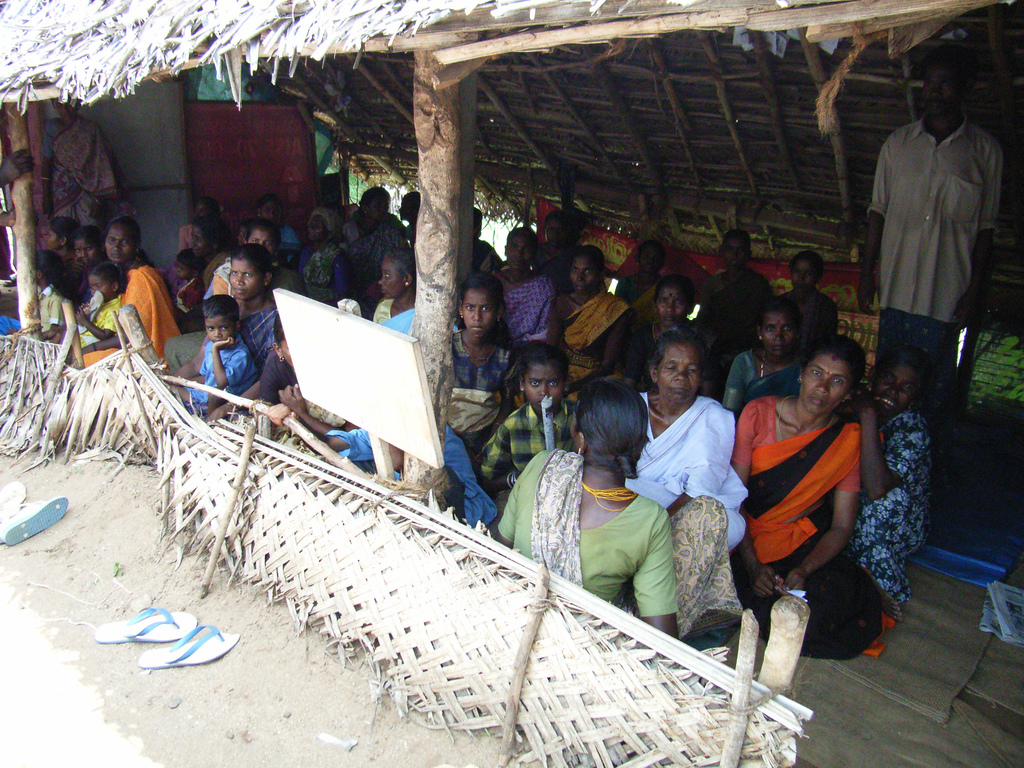
Protest camp

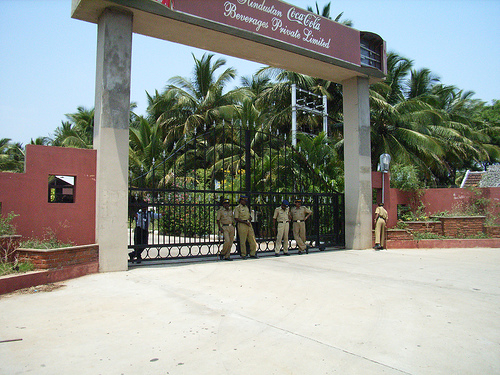
Plachimada Cococola factory

On 22 April 2002, the villagers, mostly Adivasi, began to protest in front of the factory by blocking its entrance. The impromptu protest continued and lasted for years, by gathering support from environmental groups, locals and national political parties and activists. Continued protests and litigation eventually helped the people of Plachimada to shut down the factory in March 2004.

While a government committee estimated the damages to be around ₹ 216 crore ($30 million), compensation has yet to be paid to the villagers.

On 8 October 1999, Hindustan Coca-Cola Beverages Private (HCBLP), a subsidiary of the Coca-Cola Company, applied for a license at Perumatty panchayat to establish a factory in Plachimada. On 27 January 2000 the company was granted permission to open the factory. The firm purchased a roughly 34.64-acre (14.02 ha) plot, which had previously been used to cultivate paddy, peanuts and vegetables. The factory employed 130 permanent workers and approximately 250 temporary laborers. Brands produced at the Plachimada factory included Coca-Cola, Limca, Fanta, Thums Up, Sprite, Kinley Soda, and Maaza. The factory used 500,000 litres of groundwater a day for its production after obtaining permission from Perumatty panchayat, which was later confirmed by the Kerala High Court.

Villagers living nearby the factory started reporting increased water pollution six months after the factory was opened. Accessing water for agricultural purposes became an issue.

The factory had also made a practice of distributing its sludge waste from the manufacturing process as free fertilizer to the villagers. In 2003, a BBC journalist visited the village to investigate the claims made by the villagers that the sludge was contaminated. As part of his reporting for BBC Radio 4's Face the Facts, he has picked up samples of the sludge and sent to the United Kingdom to be analyzed. A lab at the University of Exeter found unacceptably high levels of cadmium and lead in the sludge. Lead is toxic to human development and the nervous system, while cadmium is a documented carcinogen.

Mounting pressure on the Kerala Government to shut down the factory, Greenpeace Campaign Head Ameer Shahul shared the University of Exeter analysis report to the Kerala State Pollution Control Board and to the local media, and demanded permanent closure of the factory. Soon, the Kerala State Pollution Control Board confirmed these test results and ordered The Coca-Cola Company to stop distribution of its waste and to recover what had been dispersed in the past.

== Protests ==
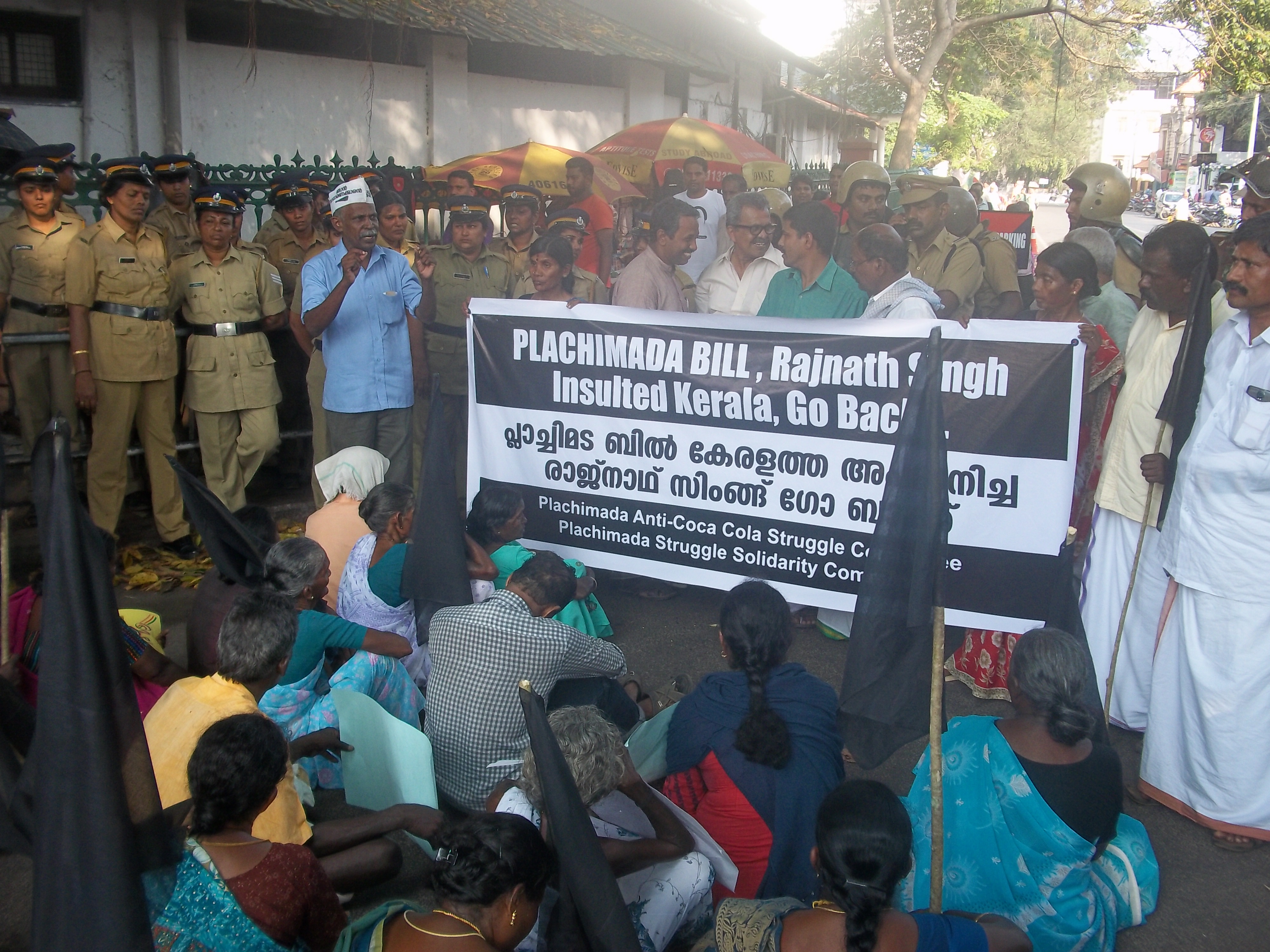
Protest by Plachimada people

After mounting evidence that The Coca-Cola Company was polluting the environment and harming local citizens, the Coca-Cola Virudha Janakeeya Samara Samithy (Anti-Coca-Cola Peoples Struggle Committee) launched their protests on 22 April 2002 by blocking the entrance to the factory. Over 1,300 people participated in this protest, mostly Adivasis and women. Scientific tests were conducted on the water by Sargram Metals Laboratories in March 2002 which deemed the water unfit for "human consumption, domestic use and for irrigation." The independent report was backed up by the government primary health center which also reported that the water was not potable in May 2003. Coca-Cola eventually admitted that there was an issue with the water, unrelated to their activities, and offered to provide drinking water to the community via trucks and to start rainwater harvesting programs at the factory and in the community.

As the villagers maintained the protest outside the factory, support grew for the movement. In January 2004, a three-day International Water Conference at Plachimada was organized to bring together activists from around the world to discuss water issues. Two environmentalists, Canadian Maude Barlow and Indian Vandana Shiva, attended the conference and issued the Plachimada Declaration stating that "water is not a private property, not a commodity" but a common resource and a fundamental right.

== Results ==
On 3 April 2003, the Perumatty panchayat revoked the license for the plant. Coca-Cola took the case to the Kerala High Court, which at first sided with the firm, saying the panchayat's claims were unscientific and unfounded. The legal battle lasted years. At times, for example, between 8 and 15 August 2005, the plant operated, but eventually, the plant was closed permanently, after Coca-Cola declared it had no plans to restart bottling operations. In 2018, the factory sat empty with a few security guards. In 2019, Coca-Cola submitted a proposal to turn the plant into a training center for local farmers.

The case was said to turn upon the legal doctrines of public trust and the polluter pays principle, as well as the legal role of local government.

The wells are still contaminated and water must be piped in from a nearby village. A High Powered Committee has determined that the damage to the community amounts to ₹ 216.26 crores or ($28 million). This figure was broken down into categories of agriculture loss, health damage, cost of providing water, wage loss and opportunity cost and the cost of pollution of water resources. However, as of 2018, no compensation has been paid to the villagers.

== Present status ==
In 2017, the Supreme Court of India dismissed all appeals concerning the Coca-Cola bottling plant in Plachimada after Hindustan Coca-Cola Beverages stated that it did not plan to resume operations there. Attempts to raise compensation issues in court have been unsuccessful, and Coca-Cola’s decision to halt operations prevented further legal consideration on this matter.

The Kerala government took over 35 acres of land from Coca Cola in Perumatty, with permission from Hindustan Coca Cola Beverages. This move sparked protests from the Anti-Coca Cola Agitation Council at Plachimada in June 2024, who argue that the government’s action benefits Coca Cola by allowing them to avoid compensating local victims first. The council demanded that the government delay taking over the land until compensation is ensured for the damages allegedly caused by the company to the Plachimada community.

== See also ==
- Mayilamma
- Oridathoru Puzhayundu, a film based on these events.
