= Bhramaram =

- Directed by: Blessy
- Written by: Blessy
- Produced by: Raju Malliath; A. R. Zulfikar
- Starring: Mohanlal; Bhumika Chawla; Suresh Menon; Murali Gopy
- Cinematography: Ajayan Vincent
- Edited by: Vijay Shanker
- Music by: Mohan Sithara
- Production company: YavonnE Entertainment Company
- Distributed by: Maxlab Cinemas and Entertainments
- Release date: 25 June 2009
- Running time: 150 minutes
- Country: India
- Language: Malayalam

Bhramaram (transl. Beetle) is a 2009 Indian Malayalam-language road thriller film, written and directed by Blessy, starring Mohanlal, Bhumika Chawla, Murali Gopy and Suresh Menon. The film was released on 25 June 2009. The film was a commercial success and was one of the highest-grossing films of the year.

== Plot ==
Unni is a share broker in Coimbatore and leads a comfortable and peaceful life with his wife Latha and daughter Lakshmi alias Lechu. Into the cosiness of such a living intrudes a stranger who introduces himself as Jose. Cashing in on Unni's forgetfulness, Jose goads him into believing that he is Unni's 7th-grade classmate. However, a sense of insecurity pervades, with the unwelcome guest – alcoholic and somewhat eccentric – pitching for an extended stay. Unni's misgivings about the 'mystery man' and his ulterior motives prove true, when his confidant and classmate, Dr. Alex Varghese, on consultation, reaffirms his doubts that they had no schoolmate in the name of Jose.

Soon, they discover to their horror that Jose is Sivankutty, a man whose arrival they have been dreading for a long time now. It is eventually revealed that Unni and Alex ruined Sivankutty's life by framing him in a murder which they had accidentally committed in their childhood. The duo realizes that it is payback time and that they are at the receiving end. Sivankutty compels Unni to accompany him back to his village and confess the crime to Sivankutty's wife Jaya and daughter Meenakshi, who have left him after they found out the secret that he has been in jail. Midway, Unni decides to abandon the plan of meeting Sivankutty's family but is threatened to accompany him. Alex joins Unni in meeting Sivankutty's family. Unni and Alex confess their crime to Sivankutty and finally agree to tell the truth about the murder to his family.

However, when they reach his house, they find out that his Jaya and Meenakshi have already died. They learns that after Jaya and Meenakshi left Sivankutty and went to Jaya's house, she didn't speak to anyone and locked themselves in her room. When Sivankutty and her parents broke in her room, they saw Jaya hung to death. Everyone believed that Jaya committed suicide after she was unable to bear Meenakshi's death. Unni and Alex escapes from the house but Sivankutty chases and catches them. Sivankutty gives Poppie, Meenakshi's pet Spitz to Unni and tells him to give Lechu by stating that her sister gave it and to not reveal anything to her. Sivankutty reveals that his main intention of bringing Unni and Alex to his village was to kill them for revenge, but he changes his mind and lets them go back after they confessed their mistake.

== Cast ==
- Mohanlal as Sivankutty/Jose Abraham/Vishnu
- Suresh Menon as Unnikrishnan (Unni)
- Murali Gopi as Dr. Alexander Varghese (Alex)
  - Tony Sigimon as Young Alex
- Bhumika Chawla as Jaya, Sivankutty's wife
- Lakshmi Gopalaswamy as Latha, Unni's wife
- Baby Niveditha as Lakshmi (Lechu), Unni's daughter
- Jayashree Sivadhas as Ambili
- KPAC Lalitha as Kavumpadathu Sharada Teacher, Sivankutty's mother
- Madhan Bob as Policeman
- Fathima Babu as Sivankutty's sister
- Shobha Mohan as Thekketharayil Kochammini, Ambili's mother
- Thampi Antony as Teacher

== Soundtrack ==
Bhramaram

Soundtrack album by Mohan Sithara
- Released: 2009
- Genre: Soundtrack
- Length: 19:04
- Label: Manorama Music
- Producers: Raju Malliath, A. R. Zulfikar

Mohan Sithara chronology
Dalamarmarangal	Bhramaram	Malayali

The soundtrack features two songs composed by Mohan Sithara, with lyrics by Anil Panachooran.

Track	Song title	Singer(s)	Duration
1	"Kuzhaloothum Poomthennale"	G. Venugopal, Sujatha Mohan	4:26
2	"Annarakanna Va"	Vijay Yesudas, Poornasree Haridas, Krishna, Vishnu, Dr. Unnikrishnan	5:06
3	"Kuzhaloothum Poomthennale"	G. Venugopal	4:26
4	"Annarakanna Va"	Mohanlal, Vishnu, Dr. Unnikrishnan	5:06

== Release ==
The film was released on 25 June 2009.

=== Reception ===
The film got positive reviews. It was widely appreciated for Mohanlal's performance. Many directors commented on the style of making and maintaining suspense. The film got overwhelmingly positive reviews from critics. It was dubbed in Telugu under the same title.

== Awards ==
Kerala State Film Awards

- Best Child Artist – Baby Niveditha

Filmfare Awards South

- Filmfare Special Jury Award – Mohanlal

Asianet Film Awards

- Best Actor – Mohanlal
- Best Child Artist – Baby Niveditha
- Best Cinematographer – Ajayan Vincent
- Best Editing – Vijay Sankar

Annual Malayalam Movie Awards (Dubai)

- Best Artistic Movie
- Best Actor – Mohanlal
- Best Child Artist – Baby Niveditha
- Best Cinematographer – Ajayan Vincent
- Best Background Score – Mohan Sithara

Amrita Mathrubhumi Film Awards

- Best Cinematographer – Ajayan Vincent

State Film Critics Awards

- Best Child Artist – Baby Niveditha

Vanitha Film Awards

- Most Popular Actor – Mohanlal
- Best Cinematographer – Ajayan Vincent

Kairali TV – World Malayali Council Film Awards

- Best Actor – Mohanlal

Federation of Film Societies

- Special Jury Award (Director) – Blessy

Jaihind TV Film Awards

- Best Director – Blessy
- Best Music Director – Mohan Sithara

Jaycee Award

- Best Actor – Mohanlal

South Cine Awards

- Best Director – Blessy

Surya TV Film Awards

- Best Cinematographer – Ajayan Vincent
- Best Child Artist – Baby Niveditha

The Sathyan Memorial Film Awards

- The Best Supporting Actor – Murali Gopy
