= Nilambur Ayisha =

Indian actress

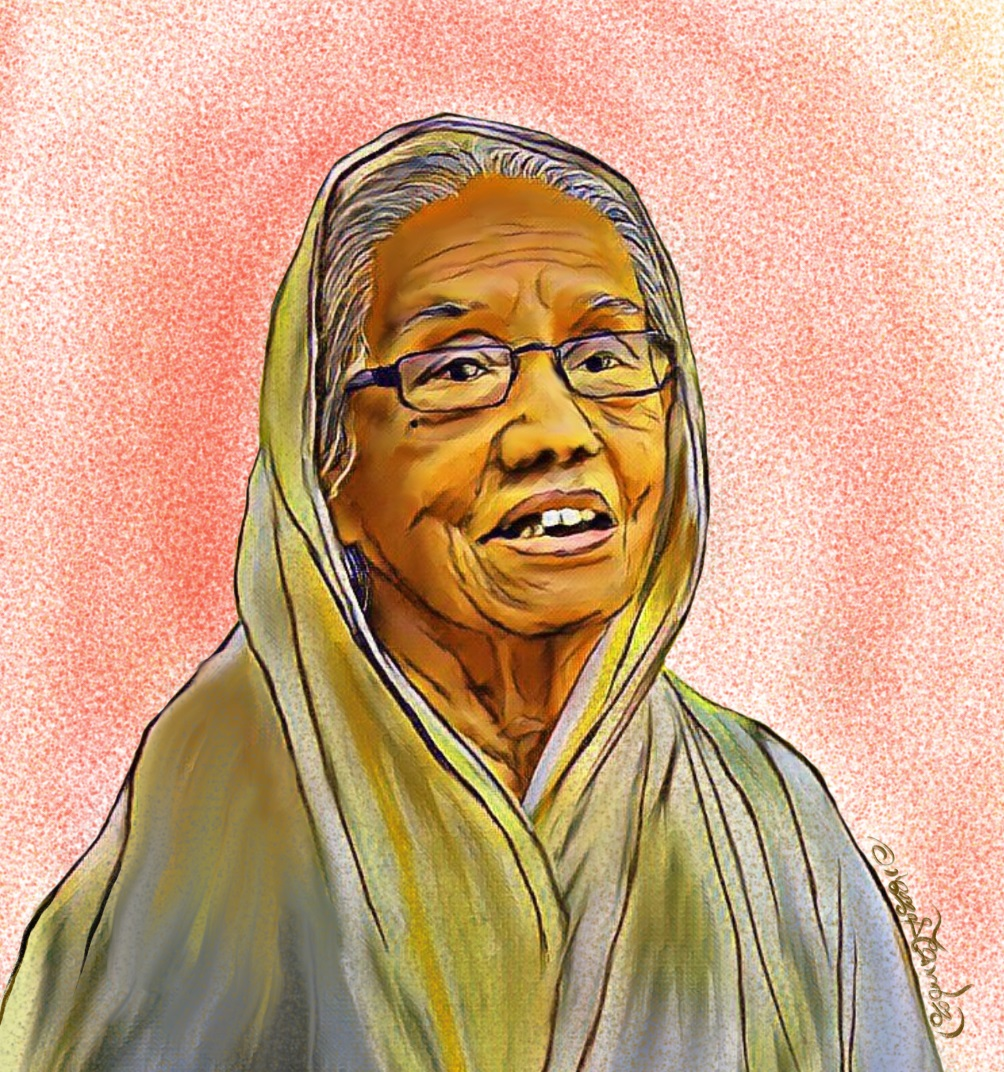
- Born: Nilambur, Malabar District, British India (present day Malappuram, Kerala, India)
- Occupations: Film Actress; Drama Artist
- Years active: 1961–present
- Children: 1

Nilambur Ayisha is an Indian actress known for her work in the Malayalam film and theatre industries. She began her career as a theatre artist before transitioning to supporting roles in Malayalam films during the late 1960s and 1970s. Over the course of her career, she has appeared in more than 50 films. She is regarded as the first woman from the Muslim community to act in Malayalam films and theatre.

== Early life ==
Ayisha was born in Nilambur, in the erstwhile Madras Presidency. She grew up in a wealthy family and developed an interest in the arts from a young age. At the age of 13, she was married to a 47-year-old man; however, the marriage ended after five days. She later raised her child as a single mother.

== Acting career ==
Ayisha began her career in theatre in the 1950s. She made her stage debut in 1953, at the age of 16, in playwright E. K. Ayamu's Ijju Nalloru Mansanakan Nokku (1953). The production was staged more than 2,500 times across different parts of the country. She subsequently worked with theatre personalities including K. T. Muhammed, Vaikom Muhammad Basheer, Khan Kavil, and P. J. Antony. She also played leading roles in K. T. Muhammed's plays Ithu Bhoomiyanu, Theekkanal, Srishti, and Kafir.

Ayisha made her film debut in the 1961 Hindi film Elephant Queen, directed by Rajendra. She portrayed a woman from a hunting family and was cast after the production was filmed in her hometown. Later that year, she made her Malayalam film debut with Kandam Becha Kottu. She subsequently appeared in films including Subaida, Kuttikkuppayam, Olavum Theeravum and Kuppivala.

== Awards and honours ==
In 2002, Ayisha received the Kerala Sangeetha Nataka Akademi Award for Drama. She has received the S.L. Puram State Prize for her overall contribution to theatre. She won the Kerala State Film Award for the Second Best Actress for her role in Oomakkuyil Padumbol in 2011. She was also awarded Premji Award in the year 2011.

Ayisha's life was the subject of the 2023 Malayalam-language biographical film Ayisha, in which Manju Warrier portrayed her. The film was directed by Aamir Pallikkal and produced by Zakariya Mohammed.

== Partial filmography ==
- Elephant (1961) as Woman in hunting family (Hindi film)
- Kandam Becha Kottu (1961) as Bethatha
- Laila Majnu (1962)
- Kutti Kuppayam (1964)
- Subaidha (1965) as Subaidha's mother
- Kuppivala (1965) as Pathiri Aminumma
- Kaathirunna Nikkah (1965) as Amina
- Kattupookkal (1965)
- Thommante Makkal (1965)
- Kavyamela (1965) as Bhavaniyamma
- Thankakkudam (1965) as Payasakkaran's wife
- Chemmeen (1966)
- Olavum Theeravum (1970) as Ayisha
- Pathiraavum Pakalvelichavum (1974)
- Kaathirunna Nimisham (1978) as Ramu's mother
- Chuvanna Vithukal (1978)
- Thenthulli (1979)
- Nalumanipookkal (1979)
- Anyarude Bhoomi (1979)
- Thraasam (1981)
- Mylanji (1982) (Ayishumma)
- Vaalkkannadi (1992)
- Ammakkilkoodu (2003) as Inmate of old age home
- Nizhalattam (2005)
- Chandrolsavam (2005) as Indu's mother
- Makalkku (2005) as Mental patient
- Daivanamathil (2005) as Ammayi
- Paradesi (2007) as Sainu
- Kaiyoppu (2007) as Beeyathu
- Shakespeare M.A. Malayalam (2008) as Mentally challenged man's mother
- Shalabham (2008) as Villager
- Vilapangalkkappuram (2008) as Valyumma
- Passenger (2009) as Nabisa Umma
- Paleri Manikyam: Oru Pathirakolapathakathinte Katha (2009)
- Keralolsavam 2009 (2009) as Basheer's umma
- Entumma (2009) as Umma
- Khilafath
- Oru Manjukalam as Lakshmikuttiyamma
- Njangalude Veedu
- Nilavinte Muthu
- Oomakkuyil Padumbol (2012) as Mansoor's umma
- Kuthanthra Siromani
- Bioscope (2013)
- Ms. Lekha Tharoor Kanunnathu (2013) as Deceased patient in hospital
- Balyakalasakhi (2014) as Jinnumma
- Koothara (2014) as Thufail's mother
- Pedithondan (2014) as Umma
- Alif (2015) as Ummakunju/Fathima's grandmother
- Compartment (2015) as Devi
- Nikkah (2015) as Aasiyumma
- Pakal Mayum Mumoe (2016)
- Pravasalokam (2016) as Najeeb's Ammayi
- Ka Bodyscapes (2016) as Kadeesumma
- Ayishakkalam (2017)
- Hello Dubaikkaran (2017) as Prakashan's grandmother
- Mattanchery (2018)
- Khalifa (2018)
- Koode (2018) as Grandmother
- Poochedi Poovinte Mottu (2019)
- Panthu (2019) as Amina's grandmother
- Virus (2019) as Staff of OP Counter, Hospital
- OP Kakshi Amminipilla (2019) as Quarrelling lady at court
- Mamangam (2019) as old woman in Chandroth family
- Udalazham (2019) as Housemaid
- Halal Love Story (2020) as actress in telefilm
- Baton Award (2020)
- Tharapori (2020) as Valyumma
- Mazhayathoru Veedu (2020) as Muthassi
- Niyathi (2021)
- Gift of Ummachi (2021) as Khadeesumma
- Khubboos (2022)
- Swami Saranam (2022)
- Olappurakkendhinoru Irumbuvaathil (2022) as
- Sparsham (2022) as Ammamma
- Vishnuvinte Umma (2022) as Vishnu's umma
- Rorschach (2022) as Shafi's mother
- Wonder Women (2022) as Mini's grandmother
- Aakasham Kadannu (2023)
- Nilambooritne Viplava Nakshathram
- Ennu Swantham Sreedharan (2023)
- Naattilellam Pattayi
- Kuruvipaappa (2023)
- Randam Naal (2023)
- Perumkaliyaattam (2024)
- Choppu (2025)

=== Television serials ===
- Rudraveena (Surya TV)

== Dramas ==
- Karinkurangu
- Ithu Bhoomiyanu
- Ullathu Paranjal
- Ee Dhuniyavil Njan Ottakkanu
- Ijju Nalloru Mansanakan Nokku
- Kafir
- Theekkanal
- Srishti
