= Sree Guruvayoorappan (1964 film) =

1964 film by S. Ramanathan

- Directed by: S. Ramanathan
- Written by: Mythology; Kedamangalam Sadanandan (dialogues)
- Screenplay by: Kedamangalam Sadanandan
- Produced by: K. S. Ganapathy
- Starring: Prem Navas; T. S. Muthaiah; Kaduvakulam Antony; Thikkurissy Sukumaran Nair; Ambika (Old); Kamala; Pandaribhai; Kedamangalam Sadhanandan
- Cinematography: P. K. Madhavan Nair
- Edited by: G. Venkittaraman
- Music by: V. Dakshinamoorthy
- Production company: Sudarsan Films
- Distributed by: Sudarsan Films
- Release date: 11 September 1964
- Country: India
- Language: Malayalam

Sree Guruvayoorappan is a 1964 Indian Malayalam-language film, directed by S. Ramanathan and produced by K. S. Ganapathy. The film stars Kaduvakulam Antony, Thikkurissy Sukumaran Nair, Kamala and Kedamangalam Sadanandan. The film had musical score by V. Dakshinamoorthy.

== Cast ==
- Thikkurissy Sukumaran Nair
- Prem Nawas
- Kamala
- Kedamangalam Sadanandan
- Pappukutty Bhagavathar
- T. S. Muthaiah
- Kaduvakulam Antony
- Ambika
- Devaki
- Kushalakumari
- Pandaribhai
- Panjabi
- S. P. Pillai
- Baby Vinodini
- Lalitha Ramanathan

== Soundtrack ==
The music was composed by V. Dakshinamoorthy and the lyrics were written by Abhayadev.

No.	Song	Singers	Lyrics	Length (m:ss)
1	"Aapath Baandhava"	K. J. Yesudas, Chorus		
2	"Bhajare Maanasa Gopalam"	V. Dakshinamoorthy	Abhayadev	
3	"Janaka Kumaariyethedi"	P. Leela	Abhayadev	
4	"Kannaal Ennini" (Avarnaneeyam)	P. Leela	Abhayadev	
5	"Krishna Krishna Enne"	P. Leela	Abhayadev	
6	"Maayaamaanava"	P. Leela	Abhayadev	
7	"Malayalipenne"	P. Leela, Renuka	Abhayadev	
8	"Omkaaramaaya Porul" (Santhakaaram)	V. Dakshinamoorthy		
9	"Radhamadhavagopala"	K. J. Yesudas	Abhayadev	
10	"Saandraananthaavabodham" (Naaraayaneeyam)	V. Dakshinamoorthy		
11	"Shivathaandavam" (Instrumental)			
12	"Umma Tharam"	P. Leela	Abhayadev	
13	"Uthar Pathwali"	V. Dakshinamoorthy	Abhayadev	
