= Maliyekkal Mariyumma =

Indian social reformer

Mariyumma Mayanali
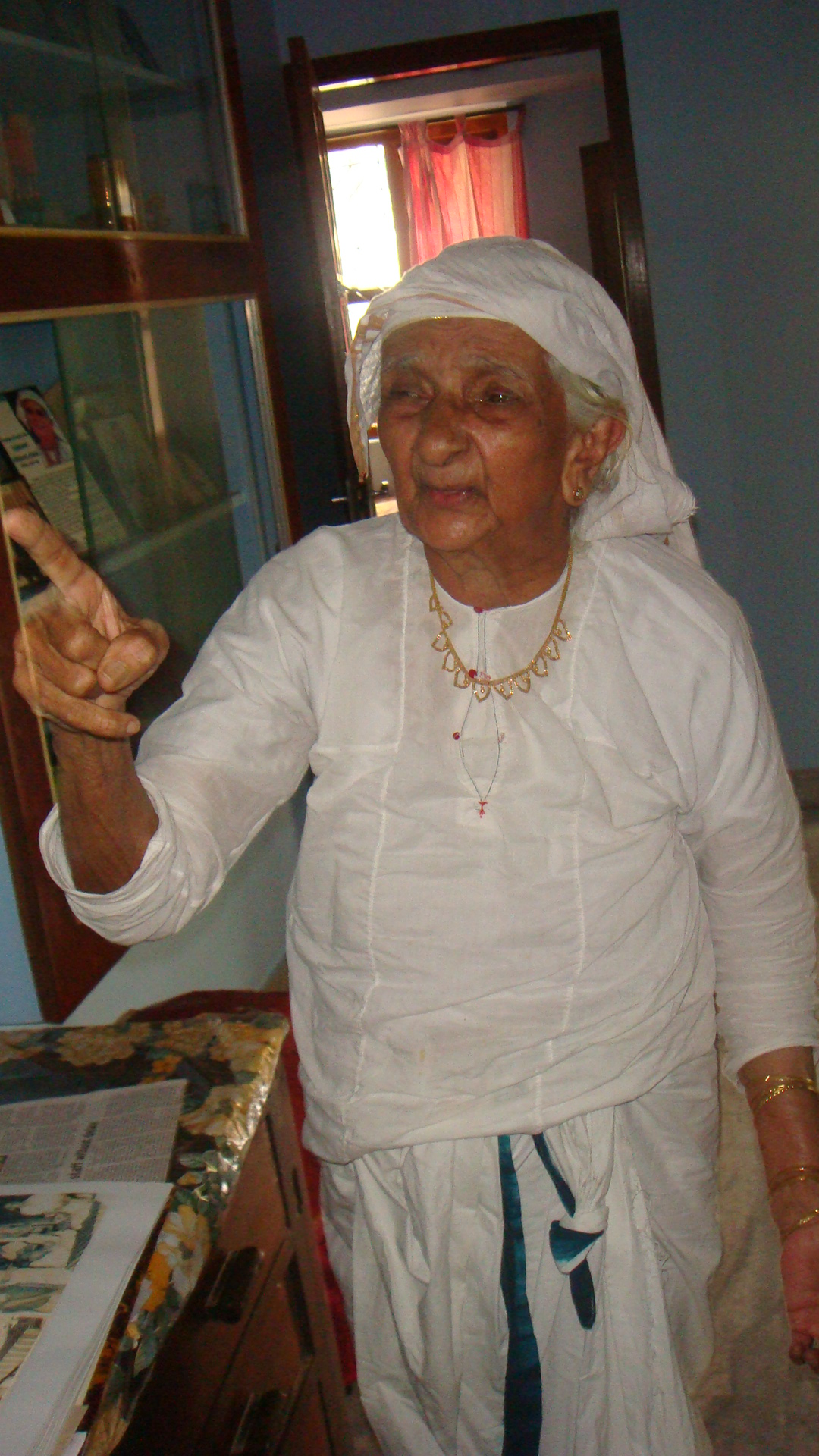
- Mariyumma in 2009
- Born: 1925; Kerala, India
- Died: 5 August 2022 (aged 96–97)
- Children: 4

Mariyumma Mayanali, known as Maliyekkal Mariyumma (1925 - 5 August 2022) was an Indian social reformer from Kerala, who is considered as one of the important icons in the history of women's progress in Kerala. When the Muslim community during her time turned its back on public education, Mariyumma, who was a member of the Thalassery Maliyekkal family, joined a convent school and passed the fifth form, equivalent to the present tenth class and learned English. She is also known for forming the Women's Society and fought against the dowry system, which still exists in India.

== Life ==
Maliyekal Mariumma was born in 1925 as the daughter of Manjumma and O. V Abdullah, who was a Muslim community leader. Her parents had participated in the Khilafat Movement. She studied English from a convent school at a time when Muslim women were very backward in the field of education. She joined Thalassery Sacred Heart School in 1938, which was run by the nuns in Mangalore and studied up to fifth standard which is equivalent to today's class ten. She was the only Muslim woman among the 200 students in the school. Mariyumma went to school until her marriage in 1943. Later, when she became pregnant, she started studying at home and became active in social activities. Mariyumma was also known for speech in English. Mariyumma, who held progressive ideas made some important interventions for the upliftment of women, especially the women among the Muslim community. The Women's Society established under the leadership of Mariyumma worked for the upliftment of women. During her final days, she used to read The Hindu, an English newspaper. She died on 5 August 2022 due to age-related issues.
