= Padmapriya Janakiraman =

Indian actress

- Born: Padmapriya Janakiraman; 28 February 1980 (age 46); Delhi, India
- Other name: Priya
- Occupations: Actress; Model
- Years active: 2004–2017; 2022–present
- Spouse: Jasmine Shah (m. 2014)

Padmapriya Janakiraman, better known as Padmapriya, is an Indian actress who mainly appears in Malayalam films. Padmapriya made her acting debut in the Telugu film Seenu Vasanthi Lakshmi in 2004.

== Early life ==
Padmapriya hails from Delhi and was born to Janakiraman, a distinguished brigadier in the Indian Army, and Vijaya, both of Tamilian descent.

She did her schooling at Kendriya Vidyalaya, Tirumalagiri, Secunderabad, Telangana and studied at Loyola Academy, Alwal, Secunderabad, from which she graduated with a B.Com degree. Later, she pursued an MBA degree in finance at KIAMS, Harihar. She was then working for GE Capital as a risk consultant in Bangalore and Gurgaon. After GE she was with Symphony in Bangalore. During her free-time, she ventured into modelling, which would later pave her way to the film business and acting. She has also won Miss Andhra Pradesh in 2001. While studying in 12th class in Andhra Pradesh, Padmapriya did a music album.

She also holds a PG Diploma in Environmental Law from National Law School of India University and Masters in Public Administration from New York University.

== Career ==
Padmapriya made her acting debut in the 2004 Telugu film Seenu Vasanthi Lakshmi, a remake of the Malayalam film Vasanthiyum Lakshmiyum Pinne Njaanum. She played the role of a sexually exploited poor sister of a blind man in the film. Padmapriya says, she accepted this offer "for the sake of friendship". This made possible her entry into the Malayalam film industry in the same year, starring in the film Kaazhcha alongside Mammootty. For her portrayal of a mother of a young girl, who struggles to accommodate another child, a victim of the Gujarat earthquake, she received rave reviews and the Asianet Award for Best Female New Face of the Year.

In 2005, she acted in her first Tamil-language film, Thavamai Thavamirundhu, a drama that dealt with familial bond, depicting a father-son relationship, in which she was paired opposite actor-director Cheran. She played a simple college girl in the film, which garnered highly positive reviews and won several awards at major Indian award ceremonies, including a National Film Award (for Best Film on Family Welfare). Padmapriya herself was awarded the Filmfare Award for Best Debut Actress for her critically acclaimed performance. She next starred in the Malayalam film Rajamanikyam again alongside Mammootty. The comedy film, featuring also Rahman and Sindhu Menon, was a success.

In 2006, she appeared in 6 films. Her first release that year was Vadakkum Nathan, which Padmapriya considers as her debut film, citing: "I started taking this career seriously with that movie". She next starred in the Tamil film Pattiyal, in which she portrayed a salesgirl at a garment company. The Vishnuvardhan-directed gangster film, in which she shared screen space with Arya, Bharath and Pooja Umashankar, was a commercial and critical success, becoming one of the highest-grossing Tamil films of the year. Later that year, she acted in the Malayalam-language film Karutha Pakshikal and Yes Your Honour, which both were well appreciated by critics. Padmapriya's performance in both the films received positive reviews, particularly her portrayal as Poongodi, a street beggar, in the former fetched her rave accolades and earned her several awards including a Filmfare Best Actress Award.

In 2007, she had 7 releases, the first being Anchil Oral Arjunan. Next she starred in Veeralipattu and Satham Podathey, a Tamil film. The latter was a psychological thriller directed by Vasanth, where she enacted the role of a helpless wife, who gets kidnapped by her former husband, whom she had divorced due to his alcohol addiction.

Following Satham Podathey, she appeared in the films Naalu Pennungal in Malayalam, directed by Adoor Gopalakrishnan and Mirugam in Tamil, directed by Samy. In Naalu Pennungal, which fetched its director the National Film Award for Best Direction, she played the role of a street prostitute, whilst in Mirugam, she played a tomboyish wife to a ruffian, who behaves like an animal, for which she won the Tamil Nadu State Film Special Award for Best Actress.

In 2010, Padmapriya debuted into Hindi films by playing a bar owner in Striker, as well as into Kannada films as a human rights activist in Thamassu. She also starred in the Tamil cowboy-based film Irumbukkottai Murattu Singam as an army officer's daughter, and in the Malayalam Kutty Shrank with Mammootty. In 2011, she starred in Naayika with a performance that won critical acclaim. NDTV wrote that her "beauty and acting skills helped in portraying the role to perfection and 'young Gracy' ends as the saving 'grace' of the film". She has acted in some advertisements.

== Personal life ==
On 12 November 2014, Padmapriya married Jasmine Shah in Mumbai. He is from Gujarat and works as the Policy Head for South Asia at Abdul Latif Jameel Poverty Action Lab, which is headquartered in Massachusetts Institute of Technology. She met him while both were pursuing their Master's from New York University and Columbia University, respectively.

While fliming Mirugam (2007), Padmapriya claimed Tamil director Samy slapped her on set. At an event, Padmapriya claimed the media falsely reported that the director was slapped instead by her.

== Filmography ==
Key
†	Denotes films that have not yet been released

Year	Title	Role	Language	Notes
2004	Seenu Vasanthi Lakshmi	Vasanthi	Telugu	Debut film; credited as Priya
2004	Kaazhcha	Lakshmi Madhavan	Malayalam	
2004	Amrutham	Sainaba Gopinathan	Malayalam	
2005	Thavamai Thavamirundhu	Vasanthi Ramalingam	Tamil	Won -Filmfare Award for Best Female Debut - Tamil
2005	Rajamanikyam	Malli	Malayalam	
2006	Vadakkumnadhan	Meera	Malayalam	
2006	Pattiyal	Saroja	Tamil	
2006	Ashwaroodan	Sitalakshmi	Malayalam	
2006	Bhargavacharitham Moonam Khandam	Sophia	Malayalam	
2006	Karutha Pakshikal	Poongodi	Malayalam	Won -Filmfare Award for Best Actress – Malayalam
2006	Yes Your Honour	Maya Ravishankar	Malayalam	
2007	Veeralipattu	Pooja	Malayalam	
2007	Satham Podathey	Bhanumathi	Tamil	
2007	Paradesi	Usha	Malayalam	
2007	Naalu Pennungal	Kunnipennu	Malayalam	
2007	Time	Susan Mary Thomas	Malayalam	
2007	Mirugam	Azhagama Ayyanar	Tamil	Won - Tamil Nadu State Film Award Special Prize
2008	Pachamarathanalil	Anu Sachidanandan	Malayalam	
2008	Laptop	Payal	Malayalam	
2009	Pokkisham	Nadira	Tamil	Won - Tamil Nadu State Flim Award For Best Actress
2009	Katha Parayum Theruvoram	Neeraja	Malayalam	
2009	Kana Kanmani	Maya Roy	Malayalam	
2009	Pazhassi Raja	Neeli	Malayalam	Won - Filmfare Award for Best Supporting Actress – Malayalam; National Film Award – Special Mention (feature film)
2009	Boomi Malayalam	Fousia	Malayalam	
2010	Striker	Madhu	Hindi	
2010	Irumbukkottai Murattu Singam	Pappali	Tamil	
2010	Andari Bandhuvaya	Paddu	Telugu	Also playback singer for "Jama Chattuki Jamakayalu"
2010	Thamassu	Dr. Shanthi	Kannada	
2010	Kutty Srank	Revamma	Malayalam	
2011	Aidondla Aidu	Shantha	Kannada	
2011	Seniors	Indhu	Malayalam	
2011	Snehaveedu	Sunanda	Malayalam	
2011	Naayika	Gracy	Malayalam	
2012	Aparajita Tumi	Kuhu	Bengali	
2012	Cobra	Sherly	Malayalam	
2012	Manjadikuru	Roja	Malayalam	Cameo appearance
2012	Bachelor Party	Item number	Malayalam	Cameo appearance
2012	No. 66 Madhura Bus	Soorya Padmam	Malayalam	
2012	Ivan Megharoopan	Ammini	Malayalam	
2012	Poppins	Kantha	Malayalam	
2013	Maad Dad	Dr. Rasiya	Malayalam	
2013	Papilio Buddha	Collector	Malayalam	
2013	Ladies and Gentleman	Jyothy	Malayalam	
2013	Thanga Meenkal	Evita	Tamil	
2014	Bramman	Item number	Tamil	Cameo appearance
2014	Iyobinte Pusthakam	Rahel	Malayalam	
2017	Tiyaan	Vasundhara Devi	Malayalam	
2017	Patel S. I. R.	Rajeswari / Raaji	Telugu	
2017	Crossroad	Seema	Malayalam	
2017	Chef	Radha Menon	Hindi	
2022	Oru Thekkan Thallu Case	Rukmini	Malayalam	
2022	Wonder Women	Veni	English	
2025	Yuva Sapnon Ka Safar	Gowri	Multilingual (mainly English)	Anthology series Segment: Backstage
2025	Dear Maa	Ahana Nair	Bengali	Cameo appearance

== Awards ==
National Film Awards

- 2010 - Special Mention – Pazhassiraja

Tamil Nadu State Film Award

- 2007 - Tamil Nadu State Film Award Special Prize – Mirugam
- 2009 - Tamil Nadu State Film Award - Pokkisham

Kerala State Film Awards

- 2006 - Second Best Actress – Karutha Pakshikal
- 2009 - Second Best Actress – Pazhassiraja

Filmfare Award South

- 2005 - Best Female Debut (South) – Thavamai Thavamirundhu
- 2006 - Best Actress – Malayalam – Karutha Pakshikal
- 2009 - Best Supporting Actress – Malayalam – Pazhassiraja
