= Mayilamma =

Indian social activist (1937–2007)

Mayilamma (10 August 1937 – 6 January 2007) was an Indian social activist whose claim to fame was the campaign against Coca-Cola Company in Plachimada in Palakkad, Kerala. She belonged to a native tribal community. She was the recipient of the Speak Out award by Outlook magazine and the Sthree Shakthi Award. She is also known as the 'Plachimada Heroine'.

== Early life ==
She was born on 10 August 1937 in the village Muthalamada, on the border of Palakkad. When she turned 15 years old, her father Raman and mother Kurumanda married her off to Mari Muthu from Plachimada. She came to live with him in Plachimada after her wedding. The couple had four children. Mari muthu died before she stepped into the terrain of grassroots activism.

== Fight against Coca-Cola ==
Mayilamma was directly affected by Coca-Cola's operations in Plachimada, in Kerala's Palakkad district. The water in her well (in Vijaynagar colony in Plachimada) had been so heavily polluted by Coca-Cola's operations that it has been deemed unfit for human consumption.

Mayilamma played a key role in the campaign to hold Coca-Cola accountable for water shortages and pollution in the area. She joined the agitation after one year of its operation. She launched a Satyagraha against Coco-Cola on April 22, 2002. It was under her leadership that the community forced the Coca-Cola bottling plant to shut down in March 2004. The plant has remained shut down since.

Mayilamma, a member of the Eravalar tribe, was the founder of the Coca-Cola Virudha Samara Samiti (Anti Coca-Cola Struggle Committee) in Plachimada which has spearheaded the campaign against Coca-Cola. The Anti-Coca-Cola Struggle Committee has held a continuous vigil directly outside Coca-Cola's factory gates since 22 April 2002, demanding its permanent closure.

She never joined a political party as she felt that political parties were detrimental to grassroots based development.

Mayilamma lived with her extended family in Vijaynagar Colony in Plachimada, and is survived by three sons and a daughter.

Mayilamma died on 6 January 2007. She was cremated in the Sarkarpathy burial ground in Perumatty grama panchayat, Chittur.

== See also ==
- Oridathoru Puzhayundu, film based on these events.
- Plachimada Coca-Cola Struggle
- C Saratchandran
