= Yes Your Honour =

- Poster
- Directed by: V. M. Vinu
- Written by: T. Damodaran
- Produced by: P. V. Gangadharan
- Starring: Sreenivasan; Innocent
- Cinematography: Shaji Kumar
- Edited by: P. C. Mohan
- Music by: Songs: Deepak Dev; Background Score: Rajamani
- Release date: 24 November 2006
- Country: India
- Language: Malayalam

Yes Your Honour is a 2006 Indian Malayalam-language courtroom thriller film directed by V. M. Vinu. The film stars Sreenivasan in the lead role. The film had musical score by Deepak Dev.

== Plot ==
Advocate Ravishankar is an idealistic lawyer who begins his career as a junior under the experienced but manipulative advocate Venugopal, whose treatment of his junior colleagues is often harsh and dismissive. Having entered the legal profession with the intention of serving society, Ravishankar becomes disillusioned by corruption and ethical shortcomings within the judicial system. After spending several years as a junior, he is finally assigned a case to argue in court, only for Venugopal to reassign it to another lawyer at the last moment. Frustrated, Ravishankar resigns and establishes an independent legal practice.

His first major case involves the murder of Divisional Forest Officer Sarath Shetty, with Venugopal appearing as opposing counsel. During the investigation and subsequent trial, Ravishankar uncovers evidence implicating former minister Isaac Samuel and contractor Mustafa in the murder. Following the filing of a revised charge sheet naming them as the accused, Ravishankar is appointed Public Prosecutor to conduct the case.

As the investigation progresses, Ravishankar learns that Isaac Samuel and Mustafa are associated with an organised criminal network involved in contract killings, illegal wealth accumulation, and other criminal activities. Aware that the group poses a threat to him and his family, he pretends to cooperate with them in order to gather evidence from within the organisation. Assisted by his friend, Prakash who is the Assistant Superintendent of Police, Ravishankar exposes the network's activities and presents the evidence before the court. He successfully secures the conviction of the accused and requests the maximum sentence permitted under the law. The case establishes Ravishankar's reputation as a lawyer and marks the beginning of a successful legal career.

== Cast ==
- Sreenivasan as Adv. Ravishankar
- Saikumar as Ex-Minister Isaac Samuel
- Innocent as Adv. Venugopal B. V.
- Thilakan as Sessions Judge Mukundan
- Jagathy Sreekumar as Mani, Ravishankar's friend
- Padmapriya as Maya, Ravishankar's wife (voice by Devi S.)
- Ramu as Musthafa
- Suresh Krishna as ASP Prakash IPS, Ravishankar's friend
- Riyaz Khan as Gopikrishnan, Maya's brother and Ravishankar's brother in law
- Meghanathan as CI 'Udumbu' Lakshmanan
- Babu Namboothiri as Appukkuttan, Advocate Clerk
- Anand as DFO Sarath Shetty
- Abu Salim as CI Philip Mathew (voice by Jis Joy)
- K. T. C. Abdullah as Kunjambu
- V. K. Sreeraman as Maya's father
- Sreelatha Namboothiri as Maya's mother
- Mythili Roy as Venugopal's daughter
- Varada as Ravishankar's niece
- Malavika Nair as Ravishankar's daughter
- Poornima Anand as Premi, Venugopal's wife
- Ponnamma Babu as Ravishankar's elder sister
- Geetha Nair as Mukundan's wife
- James as Velayudhan
- Nisha Sarang as Narayani
- Kiran Raj
- Kollam Ajith as Sivankutty

== Box office ==
The film became commercial success and ran 100 days in theatres.
