= Oridathoru Puzhayundu =

- Film DVD cover
- Directed by: Kalavoor Ravikumar
- Written by: Jiju Asokan
- Screenplay by: Jiju Asokan
- Story by: Jiju Asokan
- Produced by: T. B. Reghunathan
- Starring: K. B. Venu; Jenny Jasmine; Jayashree Sivadhas
- Cinematography: S. G. Raman
- Edited by: Sajit Unnikrishnan
- Music by: Dr. Mohammed Shakeel
- Production company: Kamalam Films
- Release date: February 2008
- Running time: 1:43 hrs
- Country: India
- Language: Malayalam

Oridathoru Puzhayundu is a 2008 Malayalam environmental film directed by Kalavoor Ravikumar, written and screenplay by Jiju Asokan, starring K. B. Venu, Jenny (Meera Jasmine's sister), Jayashree Sivadhas, Goutham Babu, Balachandran Chullikad etc. The film is based on a real-life incident and is dedicated to the people of Plachimada. The film won the Kerala Film Critics Association Awards for the Best film for children of 2007. Jayashree Sivadhas won the Kerala State and Kerala Film Critics awards for the best child artist.

== Plot ==
The film is about Sumangala (Jayashree Sivadhas), a young girl from Valayapatti village in Tamil Nadu, seeking refuge in Kuriachira in Thrissur, Kerala along with her folks after a factory completely exploited the water sources in her village.

The villagers come to Kerala hoping to start a new life and settle in a private land which they found. Sumangala goes to collect old plastic articles from nearby households to make a living. Once she found a clay statue in Sandeep's (Goutham Babu) house which was made by her father earlier. As she tried to get the statue, Sandeep shouted and she hid herself in the shed near the house. Later Sandeep and friends found her and continue to hide and feed her. After a few days, Venu (K. B. Venu) and Lakshmi (Jenny Jasmine) found Sumangala and the people in the neighbourhood decides to keep her with them till her mother is found. With the help of the authorities, Venu succeeded in locating Sumangala's mother and they all happily sent her back to her village. The children were worried about how Sumangala will survive in her village without water and started collecting money to help Sumangala's villagers dig a well in Valayapatti. Venu and friends came to know about this noble cause and contributed the full amount required for digging the well and sent to Sumangala. After three months, Sandeep received a letter saying that the well in constructed but the villagers want Sandeep and friends to come and drink the first pot of water from the well. Venu and friends took the children to Valayapatti and meet Sumangala and the villagers and enjoyed the water from the well.

While returning to their homes in Kuriachira, Venu saw a packaged drinking water factory beginning construction near the river in their village. Venu realised that a similar fate as that of Valayapatti is going to fall on them also sooner.

== Cast ==
- K. B. Venu as Venu
- Jenny Jasmine as Lakshmi
- Jayashree Sivadhas as Sumangala
- Balachandran Chullikad as Comrade Dasettan
- Goutham Babu as Sandeep
- Shaalin Zoya
- Harikrishnan
- Murukan
- Amarvind
- Rikhil
- Swathy

== See also ==
- Mayilamma
- Plachimada Coca-Cola Struggle
