= Vayalar Sarath Chandra Varma filmography =

List of movie songs by Sarath

This Vayalar Sarath filmography lists songs from movies written by the Indian lyricist Vayalar Sarath Chandra Varma. Overall Sarath is credited with songs from 174 movies, ranging from 1992 to 2020.

Sarath debuted in the Malay film industry with the 1992 film Ente Ponnu Thampuran. He would go on to win the Asianet Film Award for Best Lyricist in 2003 for Mizhi Randilum and in 2009 for Neelathaamara, and the P. Bhaskaran Award in 2011.

== List ==
| Year | Movie | Songs |
|---|---|---|
| 1992 | Ente Ponnuthampuraan | Surabhilaswapnangal |
| 1992 | Ente Ponnuthampuraan | Gaandharvathinu |
| 1992 | Ente Ponnuthampuraan | Maagha Maasam |
| 1992 | Aham Brahmaasmi | Himakanamaniyum |
| 1992 | Aham Brahmaasmi | Naadam Naarada |
| 1992 | Aham Brahmaasmi | Onamaasa Poonilaavum |
| 1996 | Harbour | Kannippenne Neeraadi Vaa |
| 1996 | Harbour | Maanam Vilakku Vacheda |
| 1996 | Harbour | Unni Pulkoodu |
| 1997 | Alakananda | Sringaara Yamunaa Pulinam |
| 1998 | Achaammakkuttiyude Achaayan | Cheppu kilukki Nadakkana |
| 1998 | Achaammakkuttiyude Achaayan | Janmangale Thengunnuvo |
| 1998 | Achaammakkuttiyude Achaayan | Daivahitham Pole |
| 1998 | Achaammakkuttiyude Achaayan | Njaan Kelkkunnu |
| 1998 | Achaammakkuttiyude Achaayan | Manassinte Maine |
| 2002 | Neelakaasham Niraye | Thennal Doothanaay |
| 2002 | Neelakaasham Niraye | Ariyaathe Oorumen |
| 2003 | Mizhirandilum Breakthrough Movie | Enthinaay nin |
| 2003 | Mizhirandilum Breakthrough Movie | Aalilathaaliyumaay |
| 2003 | Mizhirandilum Breakthrough Movie | Vaarmazhaville |
| 2003 | Mizhirandilum Breakthrough Movie | Omane |
| 2004 | Jalolsavam | Mizhiyile naanam |
| 2004 | Jalolsavam | Kanneerinte |
| 2005 | Chaanthu Pottu | Kaanaaponnum |
| 2005 | Chaanthu Pottu | Chaanthu Kudanjoru |
| 2005 | Chaanthu Pottu | Aazhakkadalinte |
| 2005 | Chaanthu Pottu | Omanappuzha |
| 2005 | Banglaavil Outha | Mizhikalil Nin Mizhikalil |
| 2006 | Achanurangaatha Veedu | Alelooya |
| 2006 | Achanurangaatha Veedu | Ozhukukayaay |
| 2006 | Achanurangaatha Veedu | Achanurangaatha veedu |
| 2006 | Achanurangaatha Veedu | Ziyon Manavaalan |
| 2006 | Achanurangaatha Veedu | Kunninte mele |
| 2006 | Chacko Randaaman | Doore shaarada |
| 2006 | Chacko Randaaman | Otta nokkile |
| 2006 | Chacko Randaaman | Snehavirunnukalode |
| 2006 | Chacko Randaaman | Kamba kamba |
| 2006 | Chacko Randaaman | Mast mast |
| 2006 | Chess | Chess |
| 2006 | Chess | Chandam Kaalindi |
| 2006 | Classmates | Ente khalbile |
| 2006 | Classmates | Chillujaalaka Vaathilil |
| 2006 | Classmates | Kaathirunna |
| 2006 | Classmates | Vottu |
| 2006 | Classmates | Kaattaadithanalum |
| 2006 | Classmates | Ethra Kaalam Naam |
| 2006 | Kalabham | Munayulla |
| 2006 | Kalabham | Neeyinnente |
| 2006 | Bhargavacharitham Moonam Khandam | Puthu Puthan |
| 2006 | Bhargavacharitham Moonam Khandam | Bhaargavacharitham |
| 2006 | The Don | Chandanatheril |
| 2006 | Yes Your Honour | Ravishankar in the club |
| 2006 | Yes Your Honour | Chellam |
| 2006 | Karutha Pakshikal | Venmukiletho Kaattin Kayyil |
| 2006 | Karutha Pakshikal | Mazhayil |
| 2006 | Vargam | Raajaadhiraajante |
| 2006 | Vargam | Paalaazhithumbi |
| 2006 | Vargam | Kakakkaribumuthe |
| 2006 | Vargam | Kaavalaayi |
| 2006 | Oruvan | Kuyilukale Thuyilunaroo |
| 2006 | Oruvan | Mangalyangal (Kannippenne) |
| 2006 | Ashwaaroodan | Anthivarum |
| 2006 | Ashwaaroodan | Meleyaayi |
| 2006 | Note Book | Hridayavum |
| 2006 | Note Book | Changaathikkoottam Vannu |
| 2006 | Note Book | Mazhayude Cherumani |
| 2006 | Note Book | Iniyum Mounamo |
| 2006 | Pothen Vava | Vaave makane |
| 2006 | Pothen Vava | Neraane ellaam neraane |
| 2006 | Pothen Vava | Omkaara Thidambulla |
| 2006 | Pothen Vava | Manjaadi Manimuthu |
| 2006 | Pothen Vava | Raaga |
| 2006 | Palunku | Maanathe Velli Vithaanicha |
| 2006 | Baba Kalyani | Kai Niraye Venna |
| 2006 | Baba Kalyani | Neelamizhippeelikale |
| 2006 | Baba Kalyani | Dhana Chananana |
| 2007 | Athisayan | Athishayan |
| 2007 | Athisayan | Pammi Pammi Vanne |
| 2007 | Athisayan | Neeyennomal |
| 2007 | Anchil Oraal Arjunan | Ponnunni |
| 2007 | Anchil Oraal Arjunan | Sukritham Sudhaamayam |
| 2007 | Anchil Oraal Arjunan | Vellivaal |
| 2007 | Maayaavi | Muttathe mulle |
| 2007 | Maayaavi | Sneham |
| 2007 | Inspector Garud | Manmadha |
| 2007 | Inspector Garud | Pathikkadichu |
| 2007 | Inspector Garud | Kannum Chimmi |
| 2007 | Chotta Mumbai | Vasco Da Gama |
| 2007 | Chotta Mumbai | Adithadakal Padichavanalla |
| 2007 | Chotta Mumbai | Chotta Mumbai |
| 2007 | Vinodayaathra | Thennippaayum |
| 2007 | Vinodayaathra | Akkikkokki |
| 2007 | Vinodayaathra | Mandaarappoo |
| 2007 | Vinodayaathra | Kaiyetha |
| 2007 | Panthayakkozhi | Sundariye |
| 2007 | Panthayakkozhi | Ilakozhiyum |
| 2007 | Panthayakkozhi | Karimpanayude |
| 2007 | Panthayakkozhi | Sankadathinu |
| 2007 | Goal | Enthaaninnennodonnum |
| 2007 | Goal | Maanam Thelinja |
| 2007 | Hallo | Mazhavillin |
| 2007 | Hallo | Chellathaamare |
| 2007 | Hallo | Bhajan |
| 2007 | Hallo | Kadukittu Varuthoru |
| 2007 | Hallo | Hallo |
| 2007 | Nanma | Sundarikunnile |
| 2007 | Black Cat | Aathmaavin Kaavil |
| 2007 | Best Friends | Kandilla Nee Ariyunnilla Nee |
| 2007 | Best Friends | Kili Konchunna Pol |
| 2007 | Best Friends | Mounam Vaazhum |
| 2007 | Mission 90 Days | Mizhineeru Pozhiyumbozhum |
| 2007 | Veeraalippattu | Aalilayum |
| 2007 | Veeraalippattu | Elaneerin |
| 2007 | Chocolate | Thaamarayum Sooryanum |
| 2007 | Chocolate | Kalkkanda Malaye |
| 2007 | Chocolate | Chocolate Poleyulla |
| 2007 | Chocolate | Ishtamalle Ishtamalle |
| 2007 | Hareendran Oru Nishkalankan | Kannipenne nin munnil |
| 2007 | Romeo | Kilichundan Maavin Thanuppulla |
| 2007 | Romeo | Paalkkadaliluyarum |
| 2007 | Romeo | Olikkunnu |
| 2007 | Kangaroo | Mazha Manimukile |
| 2007 | Ishtam Enikkishtam | Annum Ennum |
| 2007 | Ishtam Enikkishtam | Ilamaan Kunje |
| 2007 | Ishtam Enikkishtam | En Nenjile |
| 2007 | Ishtam Enikkishtam | Kannum Konde |
| 2007 | Ishtam Enikkishtam | Malaraangi Ninte |
| 2007 | Ishtam Enikkishtam | Manam Nontha |
| 2007 | Ishtam Enikkishtam | Piriyum Neramengilum |
| 2008 | Mohitham | Devi Kaavyamohini |
| 2008 | Mohitham | Vaave Neeyurangoo |
| 2008 | Mohitham | Manassile Kilikkood |
| 2008 | Mohitham | Raga Vathi |
| 2008 | Mohitham | Thoomanju |
| 2008 | Mohitham | Neerpola Pole |
| 2008 | Sound of Boot | Yamuna Sangeetham |
| 2008 | Calcutta News | Engu Ninnu |
| 2008 | Calcutta News | Kannaadikkoottile |
| 2008 | Calcutta News | Akaleyoru Chillamele |
| 2008 | Calcutta News | Nanmayaakunna |
| 2008 | Calcutta News | Kani Kanduvo |
| 2008 | Mulla | Aarumukhan Munnil Chennu |
| 2008 | Mulla | Ee Raavil |
| 2008 | Mulla | Kanalukalaadiya |
| 2008 | Mulla | Kannin Vaathil Chaaraathe |
| 2008 | Mulla | Mulla Mulla Mulla |
| 2008 | Positive | Oru Kaattaay Paari Nadakkaam |
| 2008 | Positive | Enthininnu Mizhineer |
| 2008 | Positive | Orikkal Neeparanju |
| 2008 | Positive | Kanda Naal Muthal |
| 2008 | SMS | Innalle Muttathu Kinnaaram |
| 2008 | SMS | Kadappurathoru D |
| 2008 | SMS | Marachonnu Pidikkan |
| 2008 | SMS | Ponathevide |
| 2008 | SMS | Om Shaanthi |
| 2008 | SMS | Kadappurathoru F |
| 2008 | Annan Thampi | Kanmaniye Punyam Nee |
| 2008 | Swarnnam | Vidhiyil |
| 2008 | Swarnnam | Cheppu Thuranne |
| 2008 | Swarnnam | Ekadantham |
| 2008 | Swarnnam | Kanneeril |
| 2008 | Pachamarathanalil | Janmatheeram |
| 2008 | Pachamarathanalil | Chithrathooval |
| 2008 | Veruthe Oru Bhaarya | Omkaram Shankil |
| 2008 | Veruthe Oru Bhaarya | Muttathengum |
| 2008 | Veruthe Oru Bhaarya | Manjilkkulikkum |
| 2008 | Veruthe Oru Bhaarya | Paadathengengo |
| 2008 | Veruthe Oru Bhaarya | Vedam Chollum |
| 2008 | Kanichukulangarayil CBI | Kuyil Swaram |
| 2008 | Parunthu | Nacho Nacho |
| 2008 | Thaavalam | Aanakeramala |
| 2008 | Thaavalam | Konnappoo |
| 2008 | Thaavalam | Thaavalangalilla |
| 2008 | Thaavalam | Vellikkolusumaayi |
| 2008 | Maya Bazar | Mizhiyil mizhiyil |
| 2008 | Maya Bazar | Jiliu Jillu Nee |
| 2008 | Lollipop | Poovin Kurunnu |
| 2008 | Lollipop | Assalaayi |
| 2008 | Lollipop | Rajakumari |
| 2008 | Lollipop | Vellimani Poo |
| 2008 | Lollipop | Jarusalemile |
| 2008 | Lollipop | Kannum Chimmi |
| 2009 | Samastha Keralam P.O. | Sundaree Sundaree |
| 2009 | Samastha Keralam P.O. | Maarikkaavadi |
| 2009 | Currency | Kottum Paattumayi |
| 2009 | Currency | Kashmir Poove |
| 2009 | Currency | Kottum |
| 2009 | Bhaagyadevatha | Allippoove Mallippoove |
| 2009 | Bhaagyadevatha | Swapnangal Kannezhuthiya |
| 2009 | Bhaagyadevatha | Aazhithirathannil |
| 2009 | Bhagavaan | Venalinte |
| 2009 | Pramukhan | Kunjolangal |
| 2009 | Pramukhan | Kanmunayaal |
| 2009 | Pramukhan | Ennunni Neeye |
| 2009 | Pramukhan | Kanna Kaarmukil |
| 2009 | Kaancheepurathe Kalyaanam | Ennada Sollada |
| 2009 | Kaancheepurathe Kalyaanam | Ankakkalialiya |
| 2009 | Oru Black and White Kudumbam | Pranava Shankholi |
| 2009 | Oru Black and White Kudumbam | Vidacholli |
| 2009 | Oru Black and White Kudumbam | Panchasaara |
| 2009 | Sudharil Sudhan | Kanpeeliyil M |
| 2009 | Kaanaakkanmani | Aadamalle |
| 2009 | Kaanaakkanmani | Muthe Muthe |
| 2009 | Kaanaakkanmani | Penpoovo |
| 2009 | Keralolsavam Mission 2009 | Mrithipaadam |
| 2009 | Keralolsavam Mission 2009 | Kannaale |
| 2009 | Keralolsavam Mission 2009 | Priyamaanasa |
| 2009 | Neelathaamara | Anuraaga Vilochananaayi |
| 2009 | Neelathaamara | Pakalonnu |
| 2009 | Neelathaamara | Neelathaamarayaay |
| 2009 | My Big Father | Nirathinkale F |
| 2009 | My Big Father | Appa Chattambi |
| 2009 | My Big Father | Nirathinkale |
| 2009 | My Big Father | Mohichille |
| 2009 | Decent Parties | Puthankodi |
| 2009 | Decent Parties | Manassin Kadalaassil |
| 2009 | Decent Parties | Poo Poo Pookkum |
| 2009 | Chattambinaadu | Mukkuttichaanthaniyunne |
| 2009 | Chattambinaadu | Chenkadalikkumbilile |
| 2009 | Chattambinaadu | Chattambinaadu |
| 2009 | Kanmazha Peyyum Munpe | Kaattu Vannu Chaare |
| 2010 | Brahmaasthram | Shaanthiyude Theerangal M |
| 2010 | Pullimaan | Thanthaaneno |
| 2010 | Paappee Appachaa | Manjin Velli |
| 2010 | Paappee Appachaa | Thammil |
| 2010 | Mummy and Me | Venmukilin F |
| 2010 | Mummy and Me | Venmukilin M |
| 2010 | Mummy and Me | Aarume Kaanaathe |
| 2010 | Mummy and Me | Malaakhapole |
| 2010 | Vande Maatharam | Chirichonnurangum |
| 2010 | Vande Maatharam | Vande Maatharam |
| 2010 | Vande Maatharam | Saarangiyil |
| 2010 | Valiyangaadi | Kinaavilinnoru |
| 2010 | Valiyangaadi | Neermizhiyode |
| 2010 | Valiyangaadi | Thenkaasikkaare |
| 2010 | Kadha Thudarunnu | Mazhemegha Chelin |
| 2010 | Kadha Thudarunnu | Kizhakkummala Kammalitta |
| 2010 | Kadha Thudarunnu | Aaro Paadunnu Doore |
| 2010 | Sakudumbam Shyamala | Naakkadichu Paattupaadi |
| 2010 | Sakudumbam Shyamala | Kannum Neetti |
| 2010 | Sakudumbam Shyamala | Manavaattippenninte |
| 2010 | Sakudumbam Shyamala | Vilicho Neeyenne |
| 2010 | Sakudumbam Shyamala | Paalaazhi Theerathe |
| 2010 | Thaskara Lahala | Raappaadikkilee |
| 2010 | Thaskara Lahala | Vidarunnathinu |
| 2010 | Puthumukhangal | Rareeraaro D |
| 2010 | Puthumukhangal | Rareeraaro |
| 2010 | Kaandahaar | Pakida Pakida |
| 2010 | Kanyakumari Express | Evide Evide |
| 2010 | Kanyakumari Express | Chilamboliyude Kalaapam |
| 2010 | Again Kasarkode Kadarbhai | Again Kasarkode |
| 2010 | Again Kasarkode Kadarbhai | Parayaruthe |
| 2010 | Again Kasarkode Kadarbhai | Paalkadal |
| 2010 | Tournament | Nila Nila |
| 2010 | Tournament | Heyyo |
| 2010 | Tournament | Manassil |
| 2010 | Chaaverppada | Nagaphana |
| 2010 | Chaaverppada | Onnanaam Kunnathe |
| 2011 | Traffic | Pakalin |
| 2011 | Traffic | Pakalin |
| 2011 | Kudumbasree Travels | Kochi Kandal |
| 2011 | Kudumbasree Travels | Thappum Thakilum |
| 2011 | Race | Manchaadi |
| 2011 | Race | Manchaadi |
| 2011 | Mohabbath | Atharu Peyyana |
| 2011 | Mohabbath | Thaimani Mulle |
| 2011 | Mohabbath | Kanakalipiyil |
| 2011 | Mohabbath | Thennalin Kaikal |
| 2011 | Mohabbath | Ente Padachavane |
| 2011 | Doubles | Aaru Nee Arike |
| 2011 | Doubles | Kiliyamma Koodu Koottum |
| 2011 | Doubles | Chaattamazhayo |
| 2011 | Doubles | Vedaanthame doore |
| 2011 | Doctor Love | Avanalle |
| 2011 | Doctor Love | Ormakal Verodum |
| 2011 | Doctor Love | Ninnodenikkulla Pranayam |
| 2011 | Doctor Love | Paalappoo Manamaayinnum |
| 2011 | Doctor Love | Aakaasham |
| 2011 | Doctor Love | Kai Onnadichen |
| 2011 | Doctor Love | Nannaavoolla |
| 2011 | Vaadaamalli | Raappukalude |
| 2011 | Vaadaamalli | Neeyo puzhapoleyen |
| 2011 | Vaadaamalli | Anuraaga Then |
| 2011 | Vaadaamalli | Thoomanjin |
| 2011 | Vaadaamalli | Neeyo puzhapoleyen |
| 2011 | Kaanaakkombathu | Doorathoru |
| 2011 | Kaanaakkombathu | Raadha Maadhavathin |
| 2011 | Vellaripraavinte Changaathi | Pathinezhinte poonkaralil |
| 2011 | Vellaripraavinte Changaathi | Thekko thekkorikkal |
| 2011 | Vellaripraavinte Changaathi | Naanam chaalicha |
| 2011 | Vellaripraavinte Changaathi | Pathinezhinte poonkaralil |
| 2011 | Innaanu Aa Kalyaanam | Oru Pole Chimmum |
| 2011 | Innaanu Aa Kalyaanam | Madhuramee Shubhayaathra |
| 2011 | Innaanu Aa Kalyaanam | Kallippenne Kamalappenne |
| 2011 | Track | Ilamkaattil |
| 2011 | Track | Kanal Vaazhum Ee Manassil |
| 2011 | Ulakam Chuttum Vaaliban | Chollu Chollu |
| 2013 | Ithu Paathiraamanal | Aalolam Thenolum |
| 2013 | Ithu Paathiraamanal | Eriveyil Kollum |
| 2013 | Ithu Paathiraamanal | Ekaaki Nee |
| 2013 | Ithu Paathiraamanal | Achanoru Malayunde |
| 2013 | Ithu Paathiraamanal | Ekaaki Nee |
| 2012 | Casanova | Kannaa Neeyo |
| 2012 | Vaidooryam | Veeralithanka |
| 2012 | Ennennum Ormmaykkaayi | Kaiyyil Kai Cherum |
| 2012 | Ennennum Ormmaykkaayi | Azhake Manjumani |
| 2012 | Ennennum Ormmaykkaayi | Ezham Kadalil |
| 2012 | Kunjaliyan | Chempazhukka |
| 2012 | Kunjaliyan | Chempazhukka |
| 2012 | Shikkaari | Kanninu Kalabhamaaya |
| 2011 | Scene No. 001 | Himaalayagiriyude Nerukayil |
| 2011 | Scene No. 001 | Sandhyaambarangalil |
| 2011 | Scene No. 001 | Pazhamozhiyile Idavazhiyude |
| 2011 | Manushyamrigam | Aalinkombil Choolam |
| 2011 | Manushyamrigam | Ashwaaroodanaaya |
| 2011 | Manushyamrigam | Nerinu Nerulla |
| 2012 | Lakshmivilaasam Renuka Makan Raghuraman | Ampili ponthaarakangal |
| 2012 | Lakshmivilaasam Renuka Makan Raghuraman | Yaathra Thudangum munpe |
| 2012 | Achante Aanmakkal | Kannum Kannum |
| 2012 | Achante Aanmakkal | Manassoru Naattu Pennine |
| 2012 | Maayaamohini | Ullil Kothi Vidarum |
| 2012 | Maayaamohini | Aavanipaadam |
| 2012 | Husbands In Goa | Neela Neela Kadalinu |
| 2012 | No. 66 Madhura Bus | Onnam Maanathe |
| 2013 | Entry | Nin Mounavum D |
| 2012 | Grihanaathan | Raagaveenayil |
| 2012 | Naadodi Mannan | Padmanaabha |
| 2012 | Maanthrikan | Alolam Thedunna |
| 2012 | Maanthrikan | Ormmakalude |
| 2012 | Maanthrikan | Ormmakalude |
| 2012 | Maanthrikan | Mukundante Vesham |
| 2013 | God For Sale - Bhakthiprasthaanam | Neelakkaadinu Mukalile |
| 2013 | God For Sale - Bhakthiprasthaanam | Vayyante Sivane |
| 2012 | Samraajyam II | Iruttine Poottaano |
| 2012 | Samraajyam II | Kettu Pottiya Pole |
| 2012 | Samraajyam II | Meghathin |
| 2013 | Housefull | Uyirin Varamaayi |
| 2013 | Housefull | Muttandaa Muttandaa |
| 2013 | Housefull | Ee Snehamukilin |
| 2013 | Lillies of March | Kannil Parakkum |
| 2012 | Lisammayude Veedu | Ziyon Manavaalan |
| 2012 | Kochi To Kodambaakkam | Nenchathile |
| 2012 | Kochi To Kodambaakkam | Odu Paambe Paambe |
| 2012 | Kochi To Kodambaakkam | Daivam Vidhichatho |
| 2012 | Kochi To Kodambaakkam | Manoharam |
| 2012 | Kochi To Kodambaakkam | Vanthittaayaa |
| 2012 | Ozhimuri | Vaakkinullile |
| 2012 | Mr. Pavanayi 99.99 | Oru Sundarippenninte |
| 2012 | Mr. Pavanayi 99.99 | Pavanaayi Varavaayi |
| 2012 | Ayaalum Njaanum Thammil | Azhalinte Aazhangalil (M) |
| 2012 | Ayaalum Njaanum Thammil | Januvariyil |
| 2012 | Ayaalum Njaanum Thammil | Thulli Manjinullil (M) |
| 2012 | Kaashh | Kaash Kaash Kaash |
| 2012 | Kaashh | Daivathin Varamulla |
| 2012 | Kaashh | Kuruvi Pathariya M |
| 2012 | Face 2 Face | Kannum Pootti |
| 2012 | Raasaleela | Himam Moodiyo |
| 2012 | Raasaleela | Nilaavelicham |
| 2012 | Raasaleela | Vilakkinte Naalam |
| 2012 | Raasaleela | Neelaambari |
| 2013 | Dracula | Manju Pole |
| 2013 | Dracula | Prince of Darkness |
| 2013 | Dracula | Paarijaatha Pookkal |
| 2013 | Kutteem Kolum | Kutteem Kolumeduthu |
| 2013 | Kutteem Kolum | Karalilozhukum |
| 2013 | Kutteem Kolum | Kutteem Kolumeduthu |
| 2013 | Isaac Newton S/o Philippose | Pakale Nee Doore |
| 2013 | Isaac Newton S/o Philippose | Thengum Meghangal |
| 2013 | Climax | Thaamara Poonkaikal |
| 2013 | Climax | Vinnin Kaalindiyil |
| 2013 | Climax | Mayangaan Kazhiyilla |
| 2013 | Pullippulikalum Aattinkuttiyum | Cheru Cheru |
| 2013 | Pullippulikalum Aattinkuttiyum | Haihai Hailasa |
| 2013 | Pullippulikalum Aattinkuttiyum | Koottimuttiya |
| 2013 | Pullippulikalum Aattinkuttiyum | Ottathumpi |
| 2013 | Pullippulikalum Aattinkuttiyum | Pullippulikal |
| 2013 | For Sale | Ente Mizhi |
| 2013 | Pottas Bomb | Ammaye Thedi |
| 2013 | Pottas Bomb | Chillam Chillitha |
| 2013 | Pottas Bomb | Kanmani |
| 2013 | Day Night Game | Kulirumma Nalki Ean |
| 2013 | Day Night Game | Kandaal Pennal Oru |
| 2013 | Day Night Game | Hridhayame Irukannil |
| 2013 | Day Night Game | Porattam Therottam |
| 2013 | Day Night Game | Irulilayi Irukannil |
| 2013 | Gypsy | Shilayiilaliyum |
| 2014 | Snehamulloraal Koodeyullappol | Kanmaniye Ninte |
| 2014 | Snehamulloraal Koodeyullappol | Swapnathinu |
| 2014 | Snehamulloraal Koodeyullappol | Jeevithamenna Koodu |
| 2014 | Alice A True Story | Manjin Kurumbu |
| 2014 | To Noora With Love | Kanna |
| 2014 | To Noora With Love | Swarnappattin |
| 2014 | To Noora With Love | Oodin Puka |
| 2014 | To Noora With Love | Love Mystery |
| 2014 | To Noora With Love | Pira Nee |
| 2014 | Garbhashreemaan | Wah Maaro Dhammaaro |
| 2014 | Garbhashreemaan | Kanmaniye Nee Chirichaal |
| 2014 | Garbhashreemaan | Inakkamulla Penne |
| 2014 | Garbhashreemaan | Nadodi Chaalum Mooli |
| 2014 | Apothecary | Eeran Kannino |
| 2014 | Vikramaadithyan | Manassin Thinkale |
| 2014 | Bhayya Bhayya | Nenchilaaraa |
| 2014 | Thaarangal | Kasthoorimaane |
| 2014 | 100 °C Part 1 | Pacha Manja |
| 2014 | Color Balloon | Naattumaavilum |
| 2014 | Color Balloon | Swapnakkoodu |
| 2014 | Color Balloon | Vida Chollaathe |
| 2014 | Actually | Chirakadi Mooliya |
| 2014 | Actually | Laharikaladiyana Theeram |
| 2014 | Actually | Munthiri Valliyil |
| 2015 | Rajamma@Yahoo | Olivile Kalikal |
| 2015 | Uthara Chemmeen | Kadale Alakadale |
| 2015 | Uthara Chemmeen | Pazhamozhiyude |
| 2015 | Mithram | Koottukaari Maina |
| 2015 | Mithram | Naanamulloru |
| 2015 | Mariyam Mukku | Ee Kadalinu Kolu |
| 2015 | Wonderful Journey | Poovin Chundil Chiriyumaayi |
| 2015 | Wonderful Journey | Varavayee |
| 2015 | The Reporter | Neeyen Kaathare |
| 2015 | The Reporter | Ekayaay |
| 2015 | The Reporter | Mullaykkoru Naanamaadi |
| 2015 | The Reporter | Vaarmathiye |
| 2015 | The Reporter | Karukkal Nirathi |
| 2016 | Welcome to Central Jail | Sundari |
| 2016 | Thoppil Joppan | Chil Chinchilamaay |
| 2016 | Dum | Ennodu |
| 2016 | Kochavva Paulo Ayyappa Coelho | Neelakkannula Maane |
| 2016 | Appooppan Thaadi | Vaalsalya |
| 2016 | Daivathinte Kayyoppu | Peythuvo Aadyamaay |
| 2016 | King Liar | Annadyamaay |
| 2016 | King Liar | Perum Nunappuzha |
| 2016 | Dhanayathra | Kanavunarum Mizhiye |
| 2016 | Dhanayathra | Muthaaram Choodi |
| 2016 | Dhanayathra | Kulirumen |
| 2016 | Poyi Maranju Parayaathe | Hima Bindukkal |
| 2016 | Poyi Maranju Parayaathe | Aadukiren Enullam |
| 2016 | Poyi Maranju Parayaathe | Ekaanthathayil |
| 2016 | Poyi Maranju Parayaathe | Jeevithamoru Nava |
| 2017 | Velipaadinte Pusthakam | Neeyum Ninakkulloree |
| 2017 | Dance Dance | Kaniyennumee Kannukal |
| 2017 | Dance Dance | Vaalkkannezhuthi |
| 2018 | Thenichayum Peerangippadayum | Irumizhiyil |
| 2018 | Thenichayum Peerangippadayum | Megham Njan |
| 2018 | Two Days | Chila Neram |
| 2018 | Two Days | Koumaarame |
| 2018 | Two Days | Rasayayaro |
| 2018 | Two Days | Koumaarame |
| 2018 | Puzhayamma | Omal Thingalo |
| 2019 | Vaarthakal Ithuvare | Kunneri Parannu |
| 2020 | Bhoomiyile Manohara Swakaryam | Enthinen Pranayame |
