= Rajesh =

Name list

Rajesh is a given name of Indian and Nepali origin with the translation "king".

== Given name ==
- Rajesh Sonkar, Indian politician
- Rajesh (Tamil actor), Tamil actor
- Rajesh (Kannada actor), Kannada actor
- Rajesh (Telugu actor), Telugu actor
- Rajesh Sonkar, Indian politician
- Rajesh Bishnoi, Indian cricketer
- Rajesh Chauhan, Indian cricketer
- Rajesh Gangwar, Indian social worker
- Rajesh Hamal, Nepali actor
- Rajesh Khanna, North Indian actor and politician
- Rajesh Khattar, Indian television and film actor
- Rajesh Krishnan, Indian actor and playback singer
- Rajesh Kumar (actor), Indian television actor
- Rajesh Kumar Manjhi, Indian Rashtriya Janata Dal politician
- Rajesh Mirchandani, British news presenter and communications executive
- Rajesh Pilot, Indian politician of the Congress party
- Rajesh Pillai, Indian film director
- Rajesh Roshan, Bollywood music composer
- Rajesh Sharma (disambiguation), several people
- Rajesh Singh, Fijian politician of Indian descent
- Rajesh Soosainayagam, Indian footballer known as Rajesh S
- Rajesh Touchriver, Indian film director
- Rajesh Vedprakash, Indian voice artist
- Rajesh Vaidhya, Indian veena player
- Rajesh Vivek, Indian actor

== Surname ==
- Aishwarya Rajesh (born 1990), Indian film actress
- Aryan Rajesh, Indian film actor
- Beela Rajesh (1969-2025), Indian civil servant
- M. Rajesh (born 1975), Indian film director and screenwriter
- M. B. Rajesh (born 1971), Indian politician
- Monisha Rajesh (born 1982), British travel writer and journalist
- Satyam Rajesh (born 1979), Indian actor
- Saundarya Rajesh (born 1968), Indian entrepreneur
- U. Rajesh (born 1977), Indian mandolin player, music producer and composer

== Fictional characters ==
- Raj Koothrappali, one of the main characters of The Big Bang Theory
- Rajesh Singh, a character from the British science fiction series Doctor Who.
