= Renjusha Menon =

Indian actress (1989–2023)

- Born: 1988; Kerala, India
- Died: 30 October 2023 (aged 35); Thiruvananthapuram, Kerala, India
- Cause of death: Suicide by hanging
- Occupation: Actress

Renjusha Menon (1988 – 30 October 2023) was an Indian actress, who primarily appeared in Malayalam television serials.

== Career ==
Renjusha, who was a contestant on the Malayalam celebrity reality show Nakshatra Deepangal on Kairali TV, first appeared in the program Sensation. She then acted in Surya TV's serials such as Anandaragam, Kaumudi's Varan Doctor and Ente Maathavu. Renjusha made her debut on the small screen with the serial Sthree. She then acted in serials like Nizhalattam, Magalude Amma and Balamani. In 2006, she made her film debut in Classmates. She also acted in films like Thalappavu (2008), Marykkundoru Kunjaadu (2010), City of God (2011), Bombay March 12 (2011), Lizammayude Veedu (2013). She was also a classic dancer, and took a degree in Bharatanatyam.

== Death ==
On 30 October 2023, Renjusha's body was found hanging in her rented apartment in Thiruvananthapuram. She was 35, and had been living in the apartment with her family.

== Filmography ==
=== Film ===
Year	Title	Role	Notes
2006	Classmates	Kavitha	
2008	Thalappavu	Narayani	
2010	Marykkundoru Kunjaadu	Lolappan's wife	
2011	City of God		
2011	Bombay March 12		
2013	Lisammayude Veedu		
