= Afzal Yusuf =

Indian music composer

- Born: Afzal K M
- Genres: Film score, world music
- Occupation(s): Composer, music director, keyboardist, keyboard programmer
- Instrument: Keyboard
- Years active: 2008–present
- Spouse: Jishamol (married 2005-present)
- Website: www.afzalyusuff.com

Afzal Yusuf is an Indian music composer who mainly works in the Malayalam film industry.

== Career ==
Yusuf started his music career as a keyboard live artist.

In 2008, he debuted into the Malayalam film industry with his composition for the movie 'Chandranilekulla Vazhi'. Afzal Yusuff has composed a number of songs for films. He has also been credited for introducing many great singers from Bollywood and other industries into Mollywood.

== Awards ==
- 2013 - Kerala State Film Award – Special Mention for Music Direction (Movies : Immanuel & God for Sale)
- 2013- CERA BIG Malayalam Music Awards (92.7 BIG FM) - Best contribution in Music Direction (Movies : Immanuel & Pathiramanal)
- 2013 - Thikkurushi Foundation Award - Popular Music Director (Movie : Immanuel)

== Discography ==
Year	Film	Lyrics	Other note(s)
2008	Chandranilekkoru Vazhi	Engandiyoor Chandrasekharan	Debut film as music director
2009	Calendar	Anil Panachooran	
2010	Orange	C. R. Menon	Only one song, titled Vaanam Thanna sung by Cicily.
2011	1993 Bombay, March 12	Rafeeq Ahammed, Ragesh Thivari	Mammootty Starrer film
2013	Ithu Pathiramanal	Vayalar Sarath Chandra Varma, Beeyar Prasad	A Padmakumar film, Second Collaboration with Unni Mukundan after Bombay, March 12
2013	Emmanuel (film)	Rafeeq Ahammed	A Lal Jose - Mammootty Starrer film
2013	God for Sale	Rafeeq Ahammed, Vayalar Sarath Chandra Varma, MT	Babu Janardhanan Film
2013	Parankimala	Murugan Kattakada	Senan Pallassery Film
2013	Call Me At	Beeyar Prasad, Francis T	with Tej Mervin
2014	Mylanchi Monchulla Veedu	Rafeeq Ahammed	Benny Thomas film
2016	Theeram	Rinu Razak, Hari Narayanan, Aji Kaattur	Saheed Arafath Film
2017	Engeyum Naan Eruppen (Tamil)	Nakamaneci	Debut Film in Tamil, Director Benny Thomas
