= Calendar (2009 film) =

2009 Indian film

- Directed by: Mahesh Padmanabhan
- Written by: Babu Janardhanan
- Produced by: Saji Nanthiyattu
- Starring: Navya Nair; Zarina Wahab; Prithviraj Sukumaran; Mukesh
- Cinematography: Vipin Mohan
- Edited by: Vijai Sankar
- Music by: Afzal Yusuf (songs); Benny Johnson (score)
- Production company: Nanthiyattu Films
- Distributed by: Nanthiyattu Films
- Release date: 21 May 2009
- Country: India
- Language: Malayalam

Calendar is a 2009 Indian Malayalam-language drama film directed by Mahesh Padmanabhan (in his directorial debut) and written by Babu Janardhanan. It features Navya Nair, Zarina Wahab, Prithviraj Sukumaran, Mukesh, Jagathy Sreekumar, and Maniyanpilla Raju.

== Plot ==
Thankam George, aka Thankamma, a college professor was widowed at a young age. But she didn't agree to remarriage and lived for her daughter Kochurani, now a college student.

Kochurani is in love with Olikkara Sojappan, who is a constant guest to their house. But things turn sour when Thankam learns that Sojappan and Kochurani are in love. She objects to their marriage. But ultimately relents on the condition that Sojappan won't take Kochurani away from her and will stay with her. They are engaged to be married. But fate has something else in store for them. In an accident, Sojappan dies and Kochurani who was found to be three months pregnant has miscarried. Cut to three years later, Thankam and Kochurani shift over to another place. And then comes Dr. Roy Chacko.

Roy's mother Annamma wants Roy to get married as soon as possible. She has been asking Manjooran, in whose hospital Roy works (and who is also related to Thankam), to find him a suitable bride. It's at this juncture that Thankam and Kochurani come there. Manjooran decides to try to get Roy married to Kochurani.

After Kochurani marry Roy things get changed. Kochurani, a newlywed, ceased to be as close to Thankam as she used to. Thankamma wants Kochurani near her so she decides to write an anonymous letter to her son in law, describing Kochurani's past engagement and her miscarriage. An angry Kochurani speaks harshly to Thankam. Roy convinces an angry Kochurani that her mother's happiness comes only from her and that all this happened because of some miscommunication . Now Kochurani understands her mistakes and goes to Thankam's house only to find her gone.

Finally, they find Thankamma in her uncle's house. As Kochurani tries to apologise to her mother, she realises that Thankam has died in her sleep.

== Cast ==
- Navya Nair as Kochurani Sebastian
- Zarina Wahab as Prof. Thankam George
- Prithviraj Sukumaran as Olikkara Sojappan
- Mukesh as Dr. Roy Philip/Ingachan
- Jagathi Sreekumar as K. K. Manjooran
- Mallika Sukumaran as Annamma
- Kottayam Nazeer as Varghese
- Sudheer Karamana as Pulikkapparambil Variyachan
- Maniyan Pilla Raju as Fa. Thazhekkadan
- Sidhartha Siva as Shasikuttan
- Ashokan as Punyalan
- Pratap K. Pothen as Cleetus
- Jeny Susan Joseph as Geethu
- Archana Menon as a nun
- Renjusha Menon as Clara
- Bindu Ramakrishnan as Sojappan's mother
- Sangeetha Shivan as Dr. Jessy Varghese
- Ambika Mohan as Pulikkapparambil Variyachan's wife
- Joy John Antony as Joy

== Soundtrack ==
The film's soundtrack contains eight songs, all composed by Afzal Yusuf and Lyrics by Anil Panachooran.

#	Title	Singer(s)
1	"Chirakaarnna Mounam"	K. J. Yesudas, Cicily
2	"Kaana Ponnalle" (M)	Vijay Yesudas
3	"Gandharaajan Poovidarnnu"	K. J. Yesudas
4	"Gandharaajan Poovidarnnu" (F)	Sujatha Mohan
5	"Pachavellam Thachinu Sojappan..."	Vineeth Sreenivasan
6	"Punarum Puthu Manam"	Vijay Yesudas, Cicily
7	"Punarum Puthu Manam" (M)	Vijay Yesudas
8	"Kaana Ponnalle" (F)	Sujatha Mohan

== Reception ==
Calling it "average", a critic from Sify.com concluded that "Calendar has a decent plot and resources as well, like a hugely talented cast, for instance. But here the makers just didn't know how to use it all, in a wise manner and make it into an enjoyable entertainer!" Paresh C. Palicha of Rediff.com rated two out of five stars and stated that "there are a few patches where the film works and others where it cannot hold it together. Since it's the director's first attempt, we have to be lenient. But the lack of freshness in the story-telling stands out as a sore thumb".

Nowrunning.com critic stated that "the performances are remarkable, but there's no breaking free for the actors from the sob-o-rama script. This downward spiraling tragedy lacks spontaneity and spirit, and just about manages to scrape through banking heavily on its high profile cast".
