= Jyothi Krishna =

Jyothi Krishna may refer to:

- A. M. Jyothi Krishna, Indian actor and director in Tamil cinema
- Jyothi Krishna (actress), Indian actress in Malayalam cinema
- Jyothi Krishna (cricketer) (born 1990), Indian cricketer
