= Pattabhiraman =

2019 film by Kannan Thamarakkulam

- Theatrical release poster
- Directed by: Kannan Thamarakkulam
- Written by: Dinesh Pallath
- Produced by: Abraham Mathew
- Starring: Jayaram; Miya George; Baiju Santhosh; Hareesh Kanaran; Sheelu Abraham
- Cinematography: Ravichandran
- Edited by: Ranjith K. R.
- Music by: Saanand George Grace (score); M. Jayachandran (songs)
- Production company: Abaam Movies
- Distributed by: Abaam Movies
- Release date: 23 August 2019
- Running time: 139 minutes
- Country: India
- Language: Malayalam

Pattabhiraman is a 2019 Indian Malayalam-language social action comedy directed by Kannan Thamarakkulam and written by Dinesh Pallath. It stars Jayaram, Miya George, Sheelu Abraham, Prem Kumar and Sai Kumar. Later the film was dubbed into Telugu as Sarkaru Vaari Officer.

Pattabhiraman was released on 23 August 2019.

== Premise ==
Pattabhiraman is a food inspector who is on a crusade against artificiality in food products. Things turn bad when he clashes with KRK, a FMCG company owner, whose company produces chemically unhealthy foods.

== Cast ==
- Jayaram as Pattabhiraman, Food Inspector
- Baiju Santhosh as Valsan, Food Inspector
- Miya George as Tanuja Varma, A Television Anchor
- Sheelu Abraham as Vineetha, Pattabhiraman's wife
- Jayaprakash as K.R.K
- Hareesh Kanaran as Shukoor, Food safety dept. officer
- Dharmajan Bolgatty as Sunimon, Food safety dept. officer
- Kalabhavan Prajod as Venu, Food safety dept. officer
- Nandu as Chullikkal Raman Nair, Vineetha's father and Valsan's uncle
- Prem Kumar as Sandeep Kumar
- Sai Kumar as Chengannur Thampuran
- Devan as Rajasekhara Varma
- Janardhanan as Varma
- Jayan Cherthala as Solomon
- Madhuri Braganza as Maya, Solomon's wife
- Sudheer Karamana as Chandran
- Namo Narayana as Muthuvel
- Thesni Khan as Rani
- Parvathy Nambiar as Kani
- Anumol as Fida Fathima
- Biju Pappan as Aadhikeshavan
- Manikuttan as Rajan
- Abu Salim as 'Current' Jaison
- Vijayakumar as Anantha Narayanan
- Payyanur Murali as Food safety dept. Supriendenent
- Maya Viswanath as Mayor Deepa Vasudevan
- Ramesh Pisharody as Unni (cameo appearance)
- Lakshmi Sanal
- Pria Menon as Doctor
- Sathi Premji as Devaki Amma
- Pauly Valsan as Revathi Sundaram
- Dinesh Panicker as Vasudevan, Mayor's husband
- E. A. Rajendran as Sundaram
- Gayathri as Vrinda Sundaram
- Kalabhavan Shaju as Pappan
- Balaji Sarma as Rameshan
- Rajesh Sharma as Saheb

== Release ==
The official trailer of the film was unveiled by Millennium Audios on 8 August 2019.

The film was theatrically released on 23 August 2019 by Abaam Movies.

== Soundtrack ==
Pattabhiraman

Soundtrack album by M. Jayachandran
- Released: 20 July 2019
- Recorded: 2019
- Genre: Feature film soundtrack
- Language: Malayalam
- Label: Millennium Audios

M. Jayachandran chronology
Odiyan (2018)	Pattabhiraman (2019)	Mamangam (2019)

The soundtrack of the film was composed by M. Jayachandran and lyrics were by Kaithapram and Murukan Kattakada. The songs are sung by M. G. Sreekumar, K. S. Chithra, M. Jayachandran and Sangeethaa-Sangeetha Sajith.

Track list
No.	Title	Lyrics	Singer(s)	Length
1.	"Pattabhiraman"	Kaithapram	M. G. Sreekumar	3:46
2.	"Konnu Thinnum"	Murukan Kattakada	M Jayachandran and Sangeetha Sajith	2:50
