= Orissa (film) =

- Directed by: M. Padmakumar
- Written by: G.S Anil
- Produced by: Madhavan Chettikkal Edappal
- Starring: Unni Mukundan; Nedumudi Venu; Sanika Nambiar; Swasika
- Cinematography: Vinod Illambally
- Edited by: Samjith Mohammed
- Music by: Ratheesh Vegha
- Production company: Heera Films
- Distributed by: Heera Films
- Release date: 17 May 2013
- Country: India
- Language: Malayalam

Orissa is a 2013 Indian Malayalam-language romance film directed by M. Padmakumar. The film stars Unni Mukundan and Sanika Nambiar as the leads, with Kaniha and Tanusree Ghosh in supporting roles. Produced under the banner of Heera Films, Orissa is the story of an Odia girl called Suneyi — played by Sanika Nambiar — her trials and tribulations. The film released on 17 May 2013.. Additionally, the film received the Kerala State Film Award for Best Choreography, recognizing the work of choreographer Kumar Shanthi.

== Plot ==
The film was based on a Malayali constable Christudas loving an Odia girl Suneyi.

== Cast ==
- Unni Mukundan as Christhudas
- Sanika Nambiar as Suneyi
- Nedumudi Venu
- Kaniha as Chandrabhaga
- Tanushree Ghosh as Meerabhai
- Sudheesh
- Swasika
- Sadiq
- Shari as Christhudas's Mother
- Nigel Akkara as Kamadeva Pradhan
- Ganja Karuppu
- Sanjeev Chakraborty

== Soundtrack ==
The soundtrack of this film was composed by Ratheesh Vegha. The music is owned by Manorama Music.

Song	Length	Singer(s)	Lyricist(s)	Picturization
"Meghame"		Haricharan	Prakash Marar	
"Parayumo"		Rahul Nambiar & Thulasi Yatheendran	Alankkode Leelakrishnan	
"Pidayuka"		P. Jayachandran	Prakash Marar & Alankkode Leelakrishnan	
"Janmandarangalil"		Pradeep Chandrakumar	Alankkode Leelakrishnan	
"Jhum Thana"		Ganga	Shankar	
"Oriya Keerthanam"		Pradeep Chandrakumar		

Playback singer Karthik was mistakenly awarded the Kerala State Film Award for Best Singer for the song "Janmandarangalil" which was actually sung by Pradeep Chandrakumar. Music director Ratheesh Vegha has revealed that although Karthik was chosen to sing the song, his rendition did not reach perfection and was replaced by Pradeep Chandrakumar who was to sing the track for this song. Pradeep's version was only included in the film and audio CD which was however credited to Karthik for commercial purposes. Similarly, the song Jhum Thana, although sung by Ganga has been credited officially on streaming platforms to Chinmayi.

== Production ==
The film is produced by Chettikal Madhavan Edappal, and directed by M. Padmakumar who has previously directed movies like Vaasthavam, Shikar - The Hunt, Ithu Pathiramanal etc.

== Reception ==
Orissa received an average response from critics and was a box office bomb.
