= Mylanchi Monchulla Veedu =

- Theatrical release poster
- Directed by: Benny Thomas
- Written by: Udayakrishna-Siby K. Thomas
- Produced by: Haneef Mohammed
- Starring: Jayaram; Asif Ali; Siddique; Kanika; Meera Nandan; Madhu
- Cinematography: Ajayan Vincent
- Edited by: Johnkutty
- Music by: Afzal Yusuf; Bijibal (Background Score)
- Production company: Red Rose Creations
- Distributed by: Red Rose Release
- Release date: 28 November 2014
- Running time: 160 minutes
- Country: India
- Language: Malayalam

Mylanchi Monchulla Veedu (transl. House with the beauty of Henna) is a 2014 Malayalam comedy drama film written by Udayakrishna-Siby K. Thomas, directed by Benny Thomas (in his directorial debut) and produced by Haneef Mohammed under the banner of Red Rose Creations. It features actors Jayaram, Asif Ali, Kanika, Meera Nandan, Siddique and Madhu. The film received mixed reviews to good reviews from critics and audiences alike. The film became a commercial success at the box office.

== Plot ==
Zoya Sahib is head of an aristocratic Muslim Family. Kasim is his son. Wahida, Kasim's eldest daughter elopes with her lover Madhavan Kutty on the eve of her wedding. That leads to a lot of ruckus including Kasim killing Rameshan son of Narayanan Kurup due to mistaken identity by Kasim. Kasim goes to jail and released after seven years. On the way back he meets with an accident, due to which he became paralyzed. Madhavan Kutty is a renowned Ayurveda physician. He comes to Kasim's treatment by feigning to be Muslim. The rest of the film revolves around incidents that occur in the family after arrival of Madhavan Kutty for Kasim's treatment. The film ends on a happy note.

== Cast ==
- Jayaram as Dr. Madhavankutty / Dr. Mammootty
- Asif Ali as Anwar
- Siddique as Parengadathu Kasim, Zoya Sahib's son
- Madhu as Parengadathu Zoya Sahib
- Sai Kumar as Narayanan Kurup
- Kanika as Wahida, Kasim's elder daughter and Madhavankutty's wife
- Meera Nandan as Shahina, Kasim's younger daughter and Anwar's fiancée turned wife
- Kalabhavan Shajon as Ismail
- Baburaj as Dr. Shajahan
- Kalabhavan Navas as Vishnu Namboothiri (Khadar)
- Irshad as Rameshan Kurup, Narayanan's son
- Kailash as Hamsa
- Babu Namboothiri as Krishnan Vaidyer, Madhavankutty's father
- Sasi Kalinga as Mullakah
- Sunil Sukhada as Minister Ibrahim Sahib
- Chali Pala as Satheeshan, Kurup's ally
- Jayakrishnan as Babu, police inspector
- Saju Kodiyan as Beerankutty

== Soundtrack ==
Mylanchi Monchulla Veedu

Soundtrack album by Afzal Yusuf
- Released: 4 November 2014
- Genre: Feature film soundtrack
- Length: 22:28
- Label: Muzik 247

Afzal Yusuf chronology
Parankimala (2014)	Mylanchi Monchulla Veedu (2014)

All lyrics are written by Rafeeq Ahammed; all music is composed by Afzal Yusuf.

Mylanchi Monchulla Veedu (Original Motion Picture Soundtrack)
No.	Title	Singer(s)	Length
1.	"Puthanilanjikk" (Version 1)	Anwar Sadat, Rimi Tomy, Yazin Nizar	4:35
2.	"Puthanilanjikk" (Version 2)	Haricharan, Radhika Narayanan	4:35
3.	"Thammil Thammil"	Vijay Yesudas, Najim Arshad, Arun Alat, Sithara	4:33
4.	"Wahida" (Duet Version)	Shreya Ghoshal, Ranjith	4:23
5.	"Wahida" (Female Version)	Shreya Ghoshal	4:22
Total length:			22:28

The tracks "Wahida" and "Thammil Thammil" were a success and received huge response through YouTube.
