= Clint (film) =

2017 film by Hari Kumar

- Directed by: Harikumar
- Written by: K .V .Mohankumar
- Based on: Edmund Thomas Clint
- Produced by: Gokulam Gopalan
- Starring: Master Alok; Rima Kallingal; Unni Mukundan; Vinay Forrt; Renji Panicker; Joy Mathew; K. P. A. C. Lalitha; Salim Kumar; Akshara Kishor
- Cinematography: Madhu Ambat
- Music by: Ilaiyaraaja
- Production company: Sree Gokulam Movies
- Release date: 11 August 2017
- Country: India
- Language: Malayalam

Clint is a 2017 Indian Malayalam-language biographical film about Edmund Thomas Clint, a child prodigy who created 25,000 paintings before his death shortly before his seventh birthday. It was directed by Harikumar, starring Master Alok, Rima Kallingal, Unni Mukundan, Joy Mathew and K. P. A. C. Lalitha.

== Summary ==
Clint is the story of a wonder kid whose life was cut short by kidney failure.

== Cast ==
- Master Alok as Edmund Thomas Clint
- Rima Kallingal as Chinnamma Joseph
- Unni Mukundan as M. T. Joseph
- Vinay Forrt as Artist Mohan
- Renji Panicker as Writer V. K. Nambiar
- Joy Mathew as Dr. Samuel
- K. P. A. C. Lalitha as Onamma
- Salim Kumar
- Akshara Kishor as Ammu
- Riaz M. T. as Hero office friend
- Gokulam Gopalan

== Soundtrack ==
Clint

Film score by Ilaiyaraaja
- Released: 21 July 2017
- Genre: Feature film soundtrack
- Language: Malayalam
- Label: Jio Studios

Ilaiyaraaja chronology
Oru Iyakkunarin Kadhal Diary (2017)	Clint (2017)	Kathalo Rajakumari (2017)

The music composed by Ilaiyaraaja and the audio was unveiled on 21 July 2017.

No.	Song	Singers	Lyrics
1	"Neeleyetho Marivillal"	Ilaiyaraaja	Prabha Varma
2	"Olathin Melathaal"	Shreya Ghoshal	Prabha Varma
3	"Thaaram Chenthaaram"	Vijay Yesudas	Prabha Varma
4	"Olathin Melathaal" (Sad)	Shreya Ghoshal	Prabha Varma

== Release ==
The film was released in India on 11 August 2017. It was premiered on Flowers TV during Onam after a month of its theatrical release.

=== Reception ===
Mathrubhumi wrote that the film should be watched to know more about the amazing talent Clint and the film will haunt the audience as the face of Clint, with colour palette follows you. The vacuum created by Clint's death is unbearable and the film is special for the same reason. Manorama said that it is the responsibility of audience to promote this small, but beautiful film with many touching scenes not to get drowned in the crowd of commercial potboilers. Mangalam wrote that the director Harikumar has made a simple, emotional and believable film of an unusual life.

=== Festivals ===
- 23rd Kolkata International Film Festival- Official Selection
- 20th International Children's Film Festival India (ICFFI)- Official Selection
- 16th Pune International Film Festival- Official Selection
- 16th Dhaka International Film Festival- Official Selection
- 10th Bengaluru International Film Festival- Official Selection
