= Unni Mukundan =

Indian actor and film producer (born 1987)

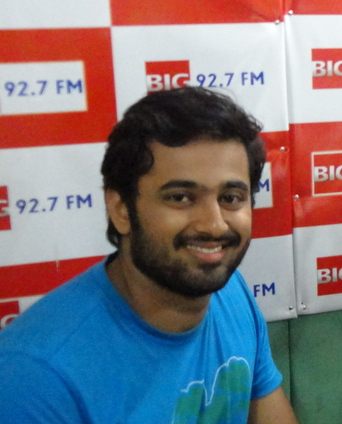
- Mukundan in 2013
- Born: Unnikrishnan; 22 September 1987 (age 39); Thrissur, Kerala, India
- Occupations: Actor; playback singer; film producer
- Years active: 2011–present

Unnikrishnan Mukundan Nair (born 22 September 1987), popularly known as Unni Mukundan, is an Indian actor and film producer who predominantly works in Malayalam cinema.

Unni made his acting debut with the Tamil film Seedan (2011). After playing several small roles, Unni got his breakthrough with his lead role in Vysakh's action comedy Mallu Singh (2012). Later, he went on to star in several commercially successful films, including Vikramadithyan (2014), KL 10 Patthu (2015), Style (2016), Oru Murai Vanthu Parthaya (2016), Achayans (2017), Malikappuram (2022) and Marco (2024), the last two emerged as his highest-grossing releases. Some of his best known non-Malayalam films are the Telugu film Janatha Garage (2016) and the Tamil film Garudan (2024).

In 2021, he won his first National Film Award as a producer for his debut production, Meppadiyan.

== Early life ==
Unni Mukundan was born in Thrissur, Kerala, on 22 September 1987 to Madathiparambil Mukundan Nair and Roji Mukundan. He did his schooling at Pragati Higher Secondary School in Ahmedabad and graduated in English literature and Journalism at Prajyoti Niketan College, Pudukad (Thrissur). He was brought up in Ahmedabad, Gujarat. During the early days of his career, he worked with Motif, now known as TTEC. He is a supporter of Bharatiya Janata Party (BJP).

== Career ==
=== Debut and breakthrough (2011–2016) ===
In 2011, Unni made his film debut with the Tamil film Seedan, a remake of the Malayalam film Nandanam. Unni entered the Malayalam film industry with Bombay March 12 featuring alongside Mammootty, directed by Babu Janardhanan. For his performance in Bombay March 12, he earned awards as best newcomer from SIIMA, Asianet Film Awards, Asiavision and Vanitha Film Awards. He played a supporting role in Thalsamayam Oru Penkutty, directed by T. K. Rajeev Kumar.

The turning point in his career came with the movie Mallu Singh (2012) directed by Vyshakh. It became a huge hit and ran for over 100 days. He did cameo appearances in movies Theevram and The Hitlist. In the same year, he appeared in Ezham Suryan and I Love Me directed by B. Unnikrishnan.

In 2013 he appeared in Ithu Pathiramanal and Orissa, both directed by M. Padmakumar. Also he was seen in D Company, an anthology of three independently shot action films.

In 2015, he was seen in supporting role in the Mammootty-starrer Fireman, directed by Deepu Karunakaran. In the same year, he played the lead role in the movie Samrajyam II: Son of Alexander as Jordan, the son of Alexander who was the protagonist in the prequel. His next release was KL 10 Patthu written and directed by debutant Muhsin Parari.

In 2016, he did the action thriller movie Style which turned out to be a decent commercial entertainer. He was then seen in the critically acclaimed movie Kaattum Mazhayum and fantasy romantic comedy film Oru Murai Vanthu Parthaya.

=== Regional films (2016–2021) ===
Unni made his Telugu debut with the film Janatha Garage in an negative role portraying Mohanlal's son. The film was both commercially successful and critically acclaimed. It was among the highest grossing Telugu films of the year.

In the 2017 film Achayans, he made his debut as a lyricist and singer. In the same year, he was seen in another multi-starrer movie Avarude Raavukal along with Asif Ali which received mixed reviews. In August of the same year, Clint by director Harikumar was released, in which he played the role of Joseph, father of Edmund Thomas Clint, a child prodigy known for having drawn over 25,000 paintings during his short life of seven years. He was seen in two different looks as a 35-year old and a 73-year-old man in the film. For this film he received Ramu Kariat Movie Award for the Best Actor. His next releases of 2017 was Mammootty-starrer Masterpiece in which he played the villain and Tharangam in which he had an extended cameo.

In 2018, he did the Telugu-Tamil bilingual film Bhaagamathie featuring Anushka Shetty which was commercially successful and critically acclaimed. His next releases were two thriller movies Ira and Chanakyathanthram. Both the films received positive reviews and were commercially successful.

His first release of 2019 was Haneef Adeni's Mikhael, in which he was the antagonist Marco Jr. He was then seen in the film Meppadiyan which had a theatrical release on 14 January 2022. Later, he was seen in the Telugu film Khiladi.

=== Malikappuram and beyond (2022–present) ===
His next appearance was in Malikappuram which earned him critical acclaim and praise. In the Telugu film Yashoda, he portrayed a negative role.

In 2024, he starred in Jai Ganesh, which he also produced, and portrayed a negative character in the Tamil film, Garudan. He next starred in Marco, a spin-off of the eponymous character from Mikhael which opened to positive reviews, it emerged as a huge box-office success and also his first 100 crore film, further cementing his position as a bankable artist.

== Other work ==
Unni launched his film production company Unni Mukundan Films (UMF) on 17 August 2020. Under this banner Unni Mukundan produced films: Meppadiyan (2022), Shefeekkinte Santhosham (2022), Jai Ganesh (2024) and Marco (2024).

Unni made his debut as a lyricist and singer with Achayans.

== Philanthropy ==
Unni sponsored road safety measures by appearing in the motor vehicle department's advertisements.

== Filmography ==
Key
†	Denotes films that have not yet been released

- Note: all films are in Malayalam, unless explicitly mentioned.

List of film credits
Year	Title	Role	Notes	Ref.
2011	Seedan	Mano Ramalingam	Tamil film; Credited as Jai Krishna	
2011	Bombay March 12	Shahjahan		
2011	Bangkok Summer	Madhavan		
2012	Thalsamayam Oru Penkutty	Suryan		
2012	Mallu Singh	Hari Narayan (Hareender Singh)		
2012	Ezham Suryan	Chitrabhanu		
2012	Theevram	Himself	Guest appearance	
2012	The Hitlist	SI Ajay Kumar	Cameo appearance	
2012	I Love Me	Savy		
2013	Ithu Pathiramanal	Eldho		
2013	Orissa	Christhuraj		
2013	D Company	Sarath	Segment: Gangs of Vadakkumnathan	
2014	The Last Supper	Alby		
2014	Vikramadithyan	Vikram Shenoy (Vikraman)		
2014	RajadhiRaja	Bridegroom	Cameo appearance	
2015	Fireman	Shahjahan		
2015	Samrajyam II: Son of Alexander	Jordan Alexander		
2015	KL 10 Patthu	Ahmad		
2016	Style	Tom		
2016	Janatha Garage	Raghava Sathyam	Telugu film	
2016	Oru Murai Vanthu Parthaya	Prakashan		
2017	Achayans	Tony Vavachan		
2017	Avarude Raavukal	Siddharth Gopan		
2017	Clint	Joseph		
2017	Tharangam	Reghu	Cameo appearance	
2017	Masterpiece	ACP John Thekkan IPS		
2018	Ira	Rajiv IPS		
2018	Bhaagamathie	Shakthi	Telugu-Tamil bilingual film	
2018	Chanakya Thanthram	Arjun Ram Mohan		
2019	Mikhael	Marco D'Peter Jr.		
2019	My Great Grandfather	Sam Christy	Cameo appearance	
2019	Pathinettam Padi	Ajith Kumar IAS	Cameo appearance	
2019	Mamangam	Chandroth Panicker		
2021	Bhramam	CI Dinesh Prabhakar		
2022	Meppadiyan	Jayakrishnan	Also producer	
2022	Bro Daddy	Dr. Cyril		
2022	12th Man	Zachariah		
2022	Khiladi	Rama Krishna	Telugu film	
2022	Pyali	Miska Saha Salman	Cameo appearance	
2022	Yashoda	Dr. Gautham	Telugu film	
2022	Shefeekkinte Santhosham	Shefeek	Also producer and playback singer	
2022	Malikappuram	CPO D. Ayyappadas		
2023	Kadhikan	Superintendent of juvenile home		
2024	Jai Ganesh	Ganeshan	Also producer	
2024	Garudan	Karuna	Tamil film	
2024	Marco	Marco D'Peter	Also producer	
2025	Get-Set Baby	Arjun Balakrishnan		
2025	Mehfil	Vijay Bhaskar		
2025	Mindiyum Paranjum	Sanal		
2027	Maa Vande †	Narendra Damodardas Modi	Hindi film; Filming	
TBA	Dare Devil †	TBA	Tamil film; Filming	

=== Dubbing roles ===
Film title	Actor	Character	Dub language	Original language	Original year release	Dub year release	Notes
He-Man and the Masters of the Universe	Nicholas Galitzine	Prince Adam / He-Man	Malayalam	English	2026	2026	

=== Television ===
List of Unni Mukundan television credits
Year	Title	Role	Notes
2020	Ente Narayanikku	Aravind a.k.a. Basheer	Short film (voiceover)
2022	Eureka 21	Williams	Cameo in final episode
2023	Muttathe Mulla	Himself	TV serial; Cameo

== Discography ==
List of Unni Mukundan film credits as a playback singer
Year	Film	Song	Composer(s)	Notes	Ref.
2017	Achayans	"Anuraagam Puthumazha Pole"	Ratheesh Vega		
2018	Chanakya Thanthram	"Etho Vazhithaarayil"	Shaan Rahman		
2018	Oru Kuttanadan Blog	"Chaarathu Nee"	Sreenath Sivasankaran		
2020	Shylock	"Ektha Boss"	Prakash Alex		
2021	Meppadiyan	"Ayyappa Song"	Vinayak Sasikumar		
2021	Ente Narayanikku	"Thodathe"	Arun Muraleedharan	Short film	
2022	Shefeekkinte Santhosham	"Khalbile Hoori"	Shaan Rahman		

List of Unni Mukundan film credits as a lyricist
Year	Film	Song	Composer(s)	Notes	Ref.
2017	Achayans	"Anuraagam Puthumazha Pole"	Ratheesh Vega		
2021	Vidhi	"Ho Jaane De"	Saanand George Grace		

== Awards ==
List of Unni Mukundan awards
Year	Award	Category	Film	Ref.
2011	Asianet Film Awards	Best New Face of the year	Bombay March 12	
2011	Asiavision Movie Awards	Best Promising Newcomer	Bombay March 12	
2011	Vanitha Film Awards	Best New Face	Bombay March 12	
2011	Jaihind TV Film Awards	Best Newcomer of the year	Bombay March 12	
2011	Amrita TV Film Awards	Best Debut actor	Bombay March 12	
2011	South Indian International Movie Awards	Best Debut Actor (Malayalam)	Bombay March 12	
2013	Pravasi Express Awards	Youth Icon	Mallu Singh	
2017	Anand TV Awards 2017 UK	Youth Icon	Achayans	
2017	Red fm Malayalam Music Awards 2017	Best Star singer	Achayans	
2017	Ramu Kariat Movie Awards	Best Actor	Clint	
2019	Creative Film Awards	Best Actor in negative role	Mikhael	
2020	Ramu Karyat award	Best second actor	Mamankam	
2020	Asianet Film Awards	Youth Icon	Mamankam, Mikheal	
2022	13th JC Daniel Foundation Awards	Best Actor (Jury Award)	Meppadiyan	
2022	Adoor NRI Forum Kuwait Chapter - Adoor Bhasi Puraskaram	Best Actor	Meppadiyan	
2022	Ramu Kariat Movie Awards	Best Actor	Meppadiyan and Shefeekinte Santhosham	
2021	69th National Film Awards	Best film of a debut director	Meppadiyan (Producer)	
2023	11th South Indian International Movie Awards	Nominated – Best Actor in a Negative Role – Telugu	Yashoda	
