= Rajesh Gangwar =

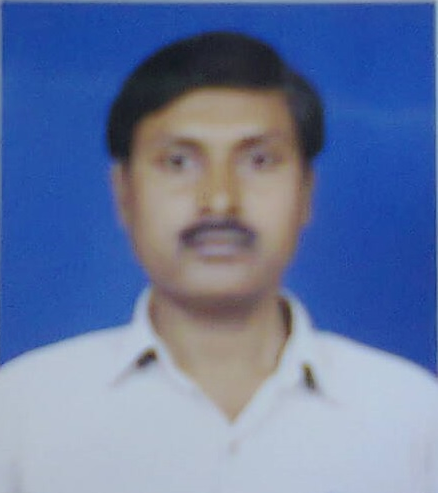
- Born: Rajesh Gangwar; 12 January 1967 (age 59); Chakdaha, Bareilly (Uttar Pradesh)
- Years active: 2001-present
- Known for: Nonviolence, Social work
- Children: Priyangi Gangwar (Daughter)

Rajesh Gangwar (born 12 January 1967) is an activist. Born and raised in a small village of Bareilly, Uttar Pradesh he became an engineer, but left his career after becoming interested in nonviolent social movements. He has been on several hunger strikes to protest against the harassment of women.

== Early life ==
Rajesh Gangwar was born in Chakdaha, a small village in Bareilly on 12 January 1967, to a family with a background in agriculture. After completing primary and secondary education at Patel Inter College, Dhaunra Bareilly, and Government Inter College, Bareilly, he studied engineering at Government Polytechnic Nainital before graduating from Bareilly College, with an interest in Sociology. He began working as an engineer at Oswal Sugar Mill, Nawabganj, Bareilly, but three years later found he lacked sufficient interest in the field, and left to focus on social work.

== Protests ==
Rajesh Gangwar has been on several hunger strikes to protest the harassment of women.

=== Hunger strike in Delhi ===
Gangwar travelled to Delhi on 24 December 2012 and went on hunger strike to protest the Government not taking enough action on the Delhi rape case. He and a 40-year-old farmer named Babu Singh, as well as other protesters and helpers, experienced extreme cold during the protest. The hunger strikers demanded the death sentence for those accused of the crime. On receiving medical advice he gave up the strike on 6 January after being hospitalized.

=== Hunger strike in Bareilly ===
After his daughter was murdered on 5 November 2014 he sat on hunger strike for 11 days.

=== Padayatra against corruption and unemployment ===
Gangwar started his padayatra on 26 May 2013 from Bareilly. He travelled more than 250 km in 11 days to raise attention to corruption and unemployment in India. He reached Delhi on 5 June 2013 via Rampur, Moradabad and Ghaziabad. After reaching Delhi, he went to Raj Ghat to pray to Mahatma Gandhi then walked around the Parliament and came to Jantar Mantar, Delhi.
