= Ravichandran (cinematographer) =

Indian Cinematographer

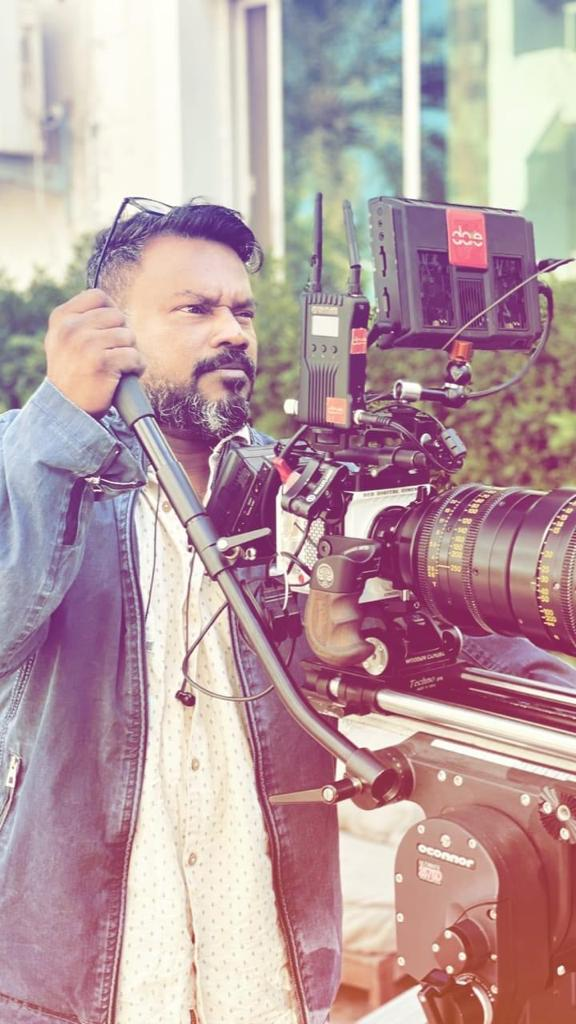
- Occupation: Director of photography
- Years active: 2013—present

Ravichandran is an Indian cinematographer, predominantly works in Malayalam films.

== Career ==
He started his career as assistant cinematographer in various Malayalam films and later he made his debut as an independent cinematographer through the film Kaanchi. His notable works includes Life of Josutty, Pattabhiraman etc.

== Filmography ==
Year	Title	Language	Notes
2013	Kaanchi	Malayalam	
2014	On the Way	Malayalam	
2015	Life of Josutty	Malayalam	
2018	Angine njanum premichu	Malayalam	
2019	Pattabhiraman	Malayalam	
2021	Vidhi	Malayalam	
2021	Udumbu	Malayalam	
2022	Ini Utharam	Malayalam	
2022	Virunnu	Malayalam	
2022	Varal	Malayalam	
2022	Aviyal	Malayalam	
2023	Quarry	Malayalam	
2023	@ at	Malayalam	
2024	DNA	Malayalam	
2025	Haal †	Malayalam	
