= Ithu Pathiramanal =

- Directed by: M. Padmakumar
- Written by: Babu Janardhanan
- Produced by: Haseeb Haneef
- Starring: Unni Mukundan; Jayasurya; Remya Nambeesan; Pradeep Rawat
- Cinematography: Manoj Pillai
- Edited by: Samjith Mohammed
- Music by: Afzal Yusuf
- Production company: Dhanush Productions
- Release date: 15 March 2013
- Running time: 130 minutes
- Language: Malayalam

Ithu Pathiramanal (English: This is Pathiramanal) is a 2013 Malayalam action film directed by M. Padmakumar starring Unni Mukundan in the lead role along with Jayasurya in a cameo role. It also stars Ramya Nambeeshan and Pradeep Rawat in supporting roles. The shooting locations are in Marayur, Pathiramanal and Alapuzha. The film became a flop at the box office.

== Plot ==
The story is about a private financer Eldho, who lives in a hill station with his mother Ambika. Ambika became mentally challenged after she was raped by a police constable Shouriyar during Eldho's childhood. His mother conceived from the rape and gave birth to a baby girl. Eldho's father Johnykutty decides to avenge Ambika's rape by going after Shouriyar and unfortunately he gets killed.

After Eldho has grown up, he reaches Pathiramanal, a place in Kuttanad, in search of Shouriyar to take revenge. There he meets Sara. He realizes that Sara is the daughter of Shouriyar and seeks her help to take his revenge.

== Cast ==
- Unni Mukundan as Eldho, Johnykutty's son
- Jayasurya as Johnykutty, Eldo's father (Cameo appearance)
- Remya Nambeesan as Sara, Shouriyar's elder daughter
- Shalu Menon as Ambika
- Pradeep Rawat as Shouriyar
- Bhagath Manuel as Murukan
- Kunchan as Chellapanashari
- Mahesh
- Anil Murali as Thankan
- Master Siddharth
- Jyothi Krishna as Salomi
- P.Balachandran as priest

== Production ==
The shoot of the film started at Alappuzha in May. The shooting was stopped for a while because of lead actor Jayasurya's injury during Vaadhyar film action sequence. Jayasurya was doing both the role of father and son in the film. But due to his injury, the son's role was filled by Unni Mukundan.

== Soundtrack ==
The soundtrack features three songs composed by Afzal Yusuff with lyrics by Vayalar Sarath Chandra Varma and Beeyar Prasad.

No.	Title	Singer(s)	Length
1.	"Ekakiyay"	K. J. Yesudas	5:57
2.	"Eriveyil"	Shreya Ghoshal	4:34
3.	"Alolam"	Najim Arshad, Mridula Warrier	4:35
