= Dexter (film) =

- Theatrical release poster
- Directed by: Suriyan G
- Written by: Sivam
- Produced by: Prakash SV
- Starring: Rajeev Pillai; Abishek Joseph George; Yukta Pervi
- Cinematography: Aathitya Govindraj
- Edited by: Srinivas P Babu
- Music by: Srinath Vijay
- Production company: Ram Entertainerss
- Distributed by: Uthraa Productions
- Release date: 14 March 2025
- Country: India
- Language: Tamil

Dexter is a 2025 Indian Tamil-language suspense thriller film directed by Suriyan G. The film stars Rajeev Govinda Pillai and Abishek Joseph George in the lead roles, alongside Yukta Pervi, Sithara Vijayan and Hareesh Peradi. The film was produced by Prakash SV under the banner of Ram Entertainers.

Dexter was released in theatres on 14 March 2025.

== Cast ==
- Rajeev Pillai
- Abishek Joseph George
- Yukta Pervi
- Sithara Vijayan
- Hareesh Peradi
- Shobha Priya
- Ashraff Gurukkul
- Janvi Muralidharan
- Fehmin Femi

== Production ==
The film was directed by Suriyan G. Cinematography was by Aathitya Govindraj, while editing was handled by Srinivas P. Babu. Srinath Vijay composed the soundtrack of the film.

== Reception ==
Dinakaran critic stated that "Aditya Govindaraj's different camera angles have traveled in line with the psycho crime suspense thriller. He has captured the dense forests with lush greenery." Maalai Malar critic rated the film two out of five stars and wrote that "Director Sooryan has made a story of revenge after becoming an adult, keeping in mind the humiliation he suffered as a child."
