= Jyothi Krishna (actress) =

Indian actress

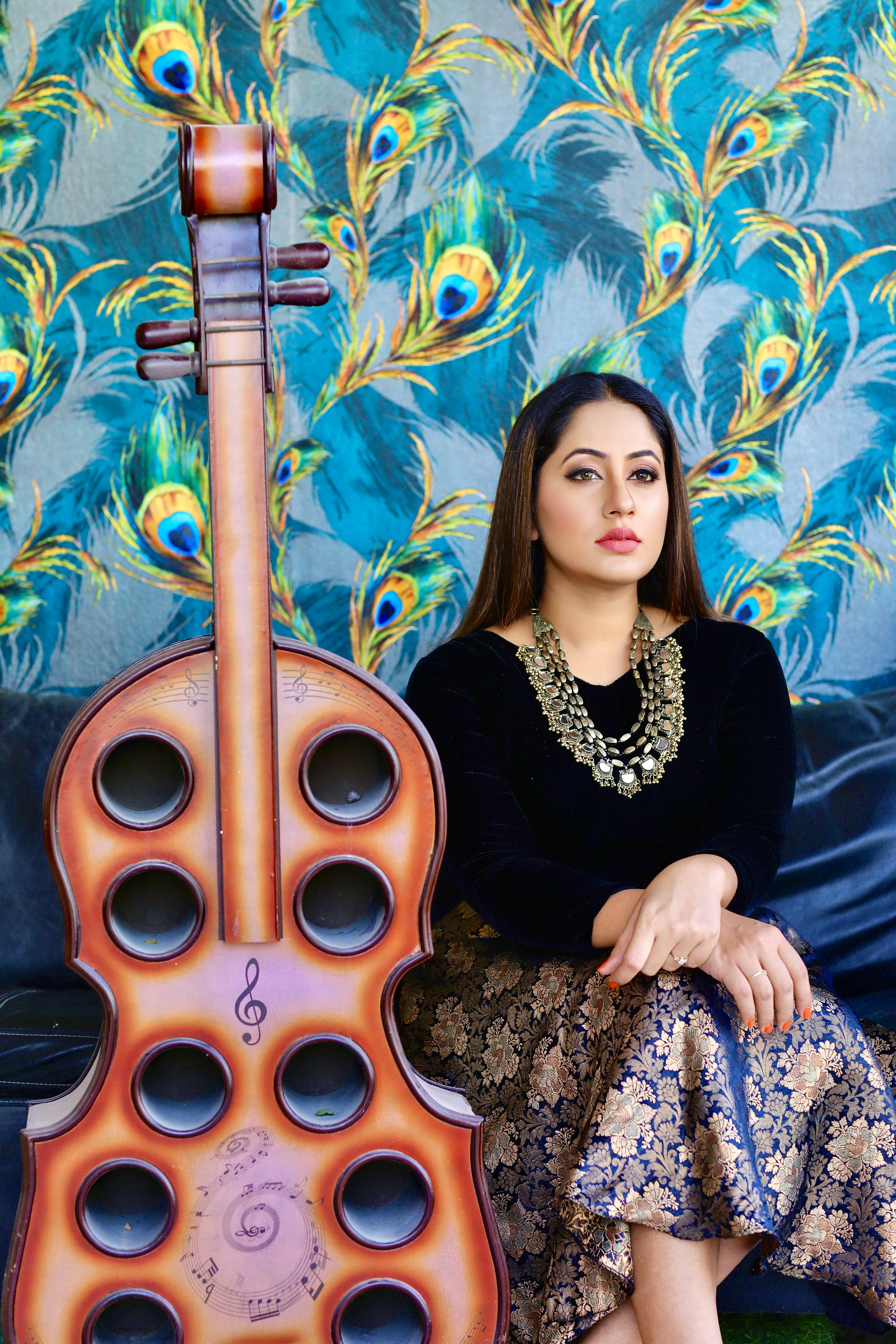
- Born: Jyothi Krishna; 27 August 1992 (age 34); Thrissur, Kerala
- Occupations: Actress, television presenter, radio jockey
- Years active: 2011-2018
- Spouse: Arun Anand Raja (m. 2016)
- Children: 1
- Parents: Rajan (father); Lolitha (mother)

Jyothi Krishna is an Indian actress and classical dancer, working in the Malayalam film industry. She is also a Television host and RJ. She made her acting debut through the 2011 film Bombay March 12. Later she acted in God for Sale (2013), Ranjith's Njaan (2014) and Jeethu Joseph's Life of Josutty (2015).

== Filmography ==
Year	Film	Role
2011	Bombay March 12	Maya
2012	Masters	Mary Paulose
2012	Last Bench	Sneha
2012	Orkut Oru Ormakoot	Malathi
2013	God for Sale	Kamala
2013	Ithu Pathiramanal	Salomi
2013	Dolls	Dr. Remya
2013	Lisammayude Veedu	School girl
2013	Avicharitha	Rihana
2014	Njaan	Lakshmikutty
2015	Life of Josutty	Rose
2016	Moonam Naal Njyayarazhcha	Kathreena
2018	Aami	Malathi

== TV ==
Year	Program	Net Work	Role	Notes
2017-2018	Laughing Villa Season 2	Surya TV	Host	

Television shows as Guest

- Get Set Chat (Kaumudy TV)
- Onnum Onnum Moonu (Mazhavil Manorama)
- Rhythm (Kairali TV)
- Grand Magical Circus (Amrita TV)
- Comedy Super Nite (Flowers TV)
- Annies Kitchen (Amrita TV)
- I Personally (Kappa TV)
