= Chathurangam (2002 film) =

2002 Indian film by K. Madhu

- Directed by: K. Madhu
- Written by: Babu Janardhanan
- Produced by: Firoz
- Starring: Mohanlal; Nagma
- Cinematography: Anandakuttan
- Edited by: P. C. Mohanan
- Music by: M. G. Sreekumar; Shyam
- Production company: Nia Production
- Distributed by: Nia Release
- Release date: 20 December 2002
- Running time: 150 minutes
- Country: India
- Language: Malayalam

Chathurangam (transl. Chess) is a 2002 Indian Malayalam-language action thriller film directed by K. Madhu and written by Babu Janardhanan. It stars Mohanlal and Nagma in lead roles. The soundtrack was composed by M. G. Sreekumar and Shyam. The plot follows Attiprackal Jimmy, a politician who aspires to become an MLA with the support of minister Kora. The film was released on 20 December 2002 and was the most anticipated Christmas release.

== Plot summary ==
The story is set in Kottayam. Jimmy Jacob of the Attiprackal house was everyone's favourite. Seeing his all round abilities and popularity, minister K.C. Korah who runs the Kerala Desham party, makes him the college chairman. And later he was made the district secretary of his party and rose to state level politics.

Jimmy becomes the be-leading right-hand of cabinet minister K.C. Korah in his fight against the opposite faction of the Kerala Desham party home minister P.P. Paulose group. but in the process creates new enemies like the Kottayam SP and IPS officer Nayana Pillai. But soon Paulose and Korah bury their hatchet and join hands. This makes Jimmy unhappy and he is left out. Later on Korah frames Jimmy in a murder case.

== Cast ==
- Mohanlal as Jimmy Jacob alias Attipraickal Jimmy
- Lalu Alex as Abkari Methikkalam Thommichan
- Nagma as SP R.Nayana Pillai IPS
- Anu Anand as Joshy Jacob
- Jagadish as Mathen Chethimattom
- Navya Nair as Sherin Mathew
- Sai Kumar as K. C. Korah, Electricity Minister
- Jagathi Sreekumar as Kochauseppu alias Thooval Ouseppu
- Vijayaraghavan as P. P. Paulose, Home Minister
- Radhika Menon as Liza Jacob (Jimmy's sister)
- Bindu Panikkar as Annie Alex(Jimmy's sister)
- Manianpilla Raju as Alex (Jimmy's brother-in-law and Annie's husband)
- K. P. A. C. Lalitha as Therutha
- Nedumudi Venu as Mathew Varghese (Sherin's father)
- Kollam Thulasi as Haridas, Prosecution Advocate
- Baburaj as SI Thankaraj
- Bheeman Raghu as SI Erattupetta Hakkim
- Suresh Krishna as Kozhuvanal Jose
- Jose Pellissery as Babychan, Uncle of Jimmy
- Sadiq as District Collector Sajan Peter
- Valsala Menon as Sister Theressa
- Augustine as Manamel Chackochan
- Shobha Mohan as Alice, wife of Mathew Varghese
- Hariprasad R as Lawyer

== Soundtrack ==
The film's soundtrack contains eight songs composed by M. G. Sreekumar, with lyrics by S. Ramesan Nair, Gireesh Puthenchery, and Shibu Chakravarthy.

#	Title	Singer(s)
1	"Chandanakoottinakathoru"	Anil Ram, Biju Mangad, Soumya Sanathanan
2	"Mizhiyil" (F)	Sujatha Mohan
3	"Mizhiyil" (D)	M. G. Sreekumar, Sujatha Mohan
4	"Nanma Niranjavale Kanya Mariyame"	K. S. Chitra, Chorus
5	"Neelaambale"	M. G. Sreekumar, Soumya Sanathanan
6	"Pookkanu"	K. J. Yesudas
7	"Valuthaayoru"	M. G. Sreekumar, Mohanlal
8	"Vellimani"	M. G. Sreekumar, Chorus

== Release ==
The film's producers signed a co-branding and sponsorship agreement with Goodlass Nerolac Paints for its marketing and advertising campaign. Such embedded marketing was novel to Malayalam cinema at that time. The film's promotional and publicity material featured branding of Nerolac Paints and was displayed in theatres and other strategic locations across Kerala. Commercials were also played in theatre halls.

Critic from Sify wrote that "Chathurangam which is entertaining up to interval, but later peters out to another tedious bore. The problem is that there are far too many murders and unmitigated violence towards the climax, which you'd have seen in a dozen Mohanlal actioneers. Still it is endurable just for Mohanlal".
