= Rajeev Pillai =

Indian film actor from Malayalam cinema (born 1982)

Rajeev Govinda Pillai
- Born: Nannoor, Kerala, India
- Occupations: Film actor, model, cricketer, dentist
- Years active: 2009–present

Rajeev Govinda Pillai is an Indian actor from Malayalam cinema. His acting debut was a lead role in the film City of God directed by Lijo Jose Pellissery (2011) where he played one of the protagonists. He has also worked as a dentist, a model, and as a cricketer for Kerala Strikers cricket team in the Celebrity Cricket League.

Being the first Kerala born and bred model to walk the major fashion weeks in India, he is considered as the pioneer in modelling in Kerala. His success in the industry motivated many Kerala youths to take up the career. Being the Captain of Kerala Strikers Cricket team in CCL, he top scored for the team 7 years of all the 9 years Kerala played.

== Early life ==
Born in a small village called ‘Nannoor’ in a Malayali Nair family from the south of Kerala, he relished the upbringing of a proper village boy. His father worked in Muscat while his mother is a retired high school Sanskrit teacher. After qualifying as a dentist, he quit his job at a hospital in Kerala to pursue an acting career.

== Career ==
In 2011, Pillai made his acting debut as the lead role in the film City of God, which was directed by Lijo Jose Pellissery.

Before making the debut in movies he had a successful run in all the major fashion weeks in India and did model for a few international brands as well. After a stint in the theatre in Mumbai he decided to try his luck in movies .

Pillai has played for Kerala Strikers team in the 2012 to 2024 seasons and Mumbai Heroes team in the 2025 season of the Celebrity Cricket League.

He represented Kerala in Celebrity Badminton League as well.

Pillai said in a 2016 interview there are no shortcuts to 'get fit quick', and encourages enthusiasts to take up mixed martial arts (MMA). His fitness regimen involves jiujitsu, capoeira, karate, boxing and CrossFit. His workout also involves a healthy and controlled diet. In the gym, he focuses on 45 minutes to 2 hours of weight training to keep his body fat content below 10 per cent.

== Awards ==
- 2016 – Asiavision Awards – special Jury Award, Oru Muthassi Gadha

== Filmography ==
Year	Film	Role	Language	Notes
2011	City of God	Sony Vadayattil	Malayalam	Debuted in a lead role
2011	Bombay March 12	Mushruf	Malayalam	Guest Appearance
2012	Kaashh	Sarath	Malayalam	
2012	Kamaal Dhamaal Malamaal	Gogo	Hindi	
2012	Karma Yodha	ACP K. Tony	Malayalam	
2013	My Fan Ramu	Abhiram	Malayalam	
2013	Oru Yathrayil		Malayalam	
2013	Thalaivaa	Raju	Tamil	
2013	D Company	Sanjay	Malayalam	Segment "Gangs of Vadakkumnathan"
2013	Second Innings	Manu Madhav	Malayalam	
2014	Yellow Pen	Akash Menon	Malayalam	Short film
2015	Guru Dakshina	Dev	Hindi	
2015	Aambala	Pasupathy's son	Tamil	
2015	Bhaskar The Rascal	Commissioner	Malayalam	Cameo Appearance
2016	Aviyal	Garudan	Tamil	Segment "Eli"
2016	The Legend		Malayalam	
2016	Oru Muthassi Gadha	Milind	Malayalam	Double Lead
2017	Nindru Kolvaan/Vyaghara		Tamil, Kannada	
2017	7 Naatkal	Siddharth Raghunath	Tamil	
2018	Diwanjimoola Grand Prix	Gunman PP Shibu	Malayalam	
2018	Angarajyathe Jimmanmar	Jimman	Malayalam	
2018	Who	Vinod Bharve	English	
2019	Muttayukallanum Mammaliyum		Malayalam	
2019	Athidi		Malayalam	Short film
2019	Pathinettam Padi	Monty's brother	Malayalam	Cameo Appearance
2020	Shakeela	Arjun	Hindi	
2021	Bruno	Rajeev	Hindi	Short film
2021	Satyameva Jayate 2	Ballu	Hindi	
2021	Sumesh and Ramesh	Kannan	Malayalam	
2022	Coffee with Kadhal	“Shining Star” Rohan	Tamil	
2023	Amigos	NIA officer	Telugu	
2023	Lily	Rajeev Pillai	Telugu	
2023	Salmon 3D	Firoz	Tamil	
2023	Hidimbha	Boya	Telugu	
2024	Malaikottai Vaaliban	General	Malayalam	
2024	Weapon	Solomon	Tamil	
2024	Petta Rap	Guna	Tamil	
2024	Gowri	Pattelar	Kannada	
2024	Prathimukham	Krishnakumar	Malayalam	
2025	Daaku Maharaaj	Goon	Telugu	
2025	Dexter	Aadi	Tamil	
2026	Peddi	Ratan Sisodia	Telugu	
