= Edmund Thomas Clint =

Indian artist (1976–1983)

- Born: 19 May 1976; Kochi, Kerala, India
- Died: 15 April 1983 (aged 6)
- Other name: Clint
- Known for: Painting, drawing

Edmund Thomas Clint (19 May 1976 — 15 April 1983) was an Indian child prodigy known for having drawn over 25,000 paintings during his life of less than seven years.

== Background ==
Clint was the only son of Late M. T. Joseph and Chinnamma Joseph. He was named after the veteran Hollywood actor and director Clint Eastwood.

He loved painting Hindu festivals and traditional events near his home in Kochi, Kerala. Although he was just six years and 11 months old when he died of kidney failure in 1983, he had drawn some 25,000 artworks. His work has been displayed in exhibitions in Thiruvananthapuram, Kerala in 1995 and 2007. At the age of 5, he secured first place in a competition held for painters below the age 18.

== Legacy ==
One of Clint's drawings - Temple Festival, c. 1982

Clint Road in Kochi, Kerala is named after him. A biography, Clint - Nirangalude Rajakumaran (Clint - The Prince of Colours) was written by Sebastian Pallithode about him. The 2007 Malayalam film Anandabhairavi, about a child prodigy was inspired by Clint's life. Edmund Thomas Clint memorial painting competition for children was held at Kochi in his memory.

In September 2014, director Harikumar declared he was planning to make a film based on the life of Clint. The movie shooting was completed in 2017. Its trailer was released on 25 July 2017, and finally the film Clint was released on 11 August 2017. Master Alok plays the title role as Clint, while Unni Mukundan and Rima Kallingal play Clint's parents.
