= Orange (2012 film) =

- Directed by: Biju Varkey
- Written by: Biju Varkey, Suresh Kochamminy
- Produced by: Ravi Bangalore
- Starring: Kalabhavan Mani; Biju Menon
- Cinematography: Ramalingam
- Edited by: B. Ajithkumar
- Music by: Manikanth Kadri, Afzal Yusuf
- Release date: 16 March 2012
- Country: India
- Language: Malayalam

Orange is a 2012 Indian Malayalam-language film directed by Biju Varkey who had earlier directed films like Devadasi, Chandranilekkulla Vazhi and Phantom. The film stars Kalabhavan Mani and Biju Menon.

== Plot ==
Yakobi is an orphan who works on a dairy farm, where he drives his own lorry on a contract basis. Orange is the name of his lorry. He falls in love with Saritha and they get marry. However, his sisters and relatives are not informed of this marriage. Later, Saritha bears a daughter, Orange. Whenever he goes to his native place, his relatives enquire why he remains a bachelor.

As usual when Yakobi was returning to Kambam after visiting his native place, a man asked him a free lift. While continuing their journey Yakobi learns that the man's name is Jith and he is going to an interview for a job in the dairy farm where Yakobi works. But they fail to arrive at the farm on time. Yakobi arranges a temporary job for Muthu at the dairy farm.

When Yakobi meets his old friend Baboottan, he invites him to his house, which becomes the turning point in the story.

== Cast ==
- Kalabhavan Mani as Yakobi
- Biju Menon as Baboottan
- Salim Kumar as Ashan
- Jaffar Idukki as Shivaji
- Lena as Saritha
- Machan Varghese as Allavuddin
- Manikandan Pattambi
- Sona Nair as Pullachi Thanku
- Prakash Nath as Jithu
- Saravanan as Thevar
- Diya Babu as Orange
- Krishna Prasad

== Production ==
The film has been shot on locations at Marayoor in 2011, but remained unreleased due to distribution problems.

== Soundtrack ==
The film's soundtrack contains 5 songs, all composed by Manikanth Kadri and Afzal Yusuf. Lyrics by Rafeeq Ahmed, C. R. Menon and Muthamizhu.

#	Title	Singer(s)
1	"Neerpalunku Mizhi"	Vineeth Sreenivasan, Shweta Mohan
2	"Oru Rosapoovin"	Benny Dayal
3	"Thinkal Tholatho"	Karthik
4	"Vanam Thanna"	Cicily
5	"Kannimunnale"	Manikka Vinayagam

== Reception ==
A critic from The Times of India wrote that "The gags are half-hearted and pop-up like uninvited guests in an otherwise dull plot. Orange, in spite of some powerful performances from Mani and Biju Menon, fails to impress the viewer".
