= Life of Josutty =

- Theatrical poster
- Directed by: Jeethu Joseph
- Written by: Rajesh Varma
- Story by: Jayalal Menon
- Produced by: Jayalal Menon; Anil Biswas; Sunil Lulla
- Starring: Dileep; Rachana Narayanankutty; Jyothi Krishna; Renjini Rupesh
- Narrated by: Dileep
- Cinematography: Ravichandran
- Edited by: Ayoob Khan
- Music by: Anil Johnson
- Production companies: Eros International; Backwater Studios
- Distributed by: Eros International; Popcorn Entertainments, Tricolor Entertainment
- Release date: 24 September 2015
- Running time: 166 minutes
- Country: India
- Language: Malayalam
- Box office: ₹10.5 crore

Life of Josutty is a 2015 Indian Malayalam-language coming-of-age drama film directed by Jeethu Joseph. The film stars Dileep in the title role along with a supporting cast consisting of Rachana Narayanankutty, Jyothi Krishna, Renjini Rupesh, Hareesh Peradi and Chembil Ashokan.

The story is formatted with commentaries from the protagonist. The screenplay and dialogue are written by Rajesh Varma. Co-produced and released by Eros International, the film is their debut production and distribution in Malayalam cinema. Life of Josutty released on 24 September 2015 and met with generally positive reviews.

== Plot ==
Josutty (Dileep) is the son of Joseph and Shoshamma. He belongs to a middle class traditional Christian farmer family in Kattappana, Idukki. As a child he desired to become a priest. But he falls in love with Jessy (Rachana Narayanankutty), his neighbor and childhood friend. Josutty is a sixth standard dropout and from a poor background, the reason why Jessy's dad refuses to marry her off to Josutty. Jessy was ready to go against her father and marry Josutty, but he doesn't want their families to suffer because of them. Later, Jessy married and moved on.

Josutty's family was in deep debt and had a sister to marry off, yielding to the advice from his friends and relatives he agrees to marry Rose (Jyothi Krishna), a divorcée nurse settled in New Zealand. After the marriage, he travels to Rotorua in New Zealand to join his wife. Upon reaching there, Josutty's life turns upside down. Rose's bipolar character confuses Josutty and he learns that his wife is having an extramarital life with a former boyfriend.

All of a sudden he realizes that he is a "total square" and that everything he believed to be true throughout life was wrong and he vows to make money. His friend Priya and Devassy help him to run a restaurant and he slowly grows economically. He falls for Priya and works for nine years in New Zealand. He proposes to Priya once but Priya confesses with grief that still her marriage status with her far staying and homosexual husband cannot be changed.

After his father's death he goes back to Kattappana facing repressed realities of emptiness in his life from the death of his mother, father and close friend. There he meets a door to door sales woman (Nayanthara) and marries her and vows to have more children than his first love and neighbor Jessy with the intent to "live life to the fullest".

== Cast ==
- Dileep as Josutty
  - Gourav Menon as Young Josutty
- Rachana Narayanankutty as Jessymol, Josutty's ex love interest
  - Nandana Varma as Young Jessy
- Jyothi Krishna as Rose, Josutty's Wife
- Renjini Rupesh as Priya
- Chembil Ashokan as Babychan
- Hareesh Peradi as Joseph
- Noby Marcose as Geevarghese
- Vijayakumari as Soshamma
- Aqsa Bhatt as Angel / Devil
- Krishna Praba as Mollykutty
- Suraj Venjarammoodu as Varkey Kunju
- Reshmi Anil as Kochu Rani
- Koottickal Jayachandran as Babu
- Saju Navodaya as Rameshan
- Nandu Pothuval as broker Stephen
- P. Balachandran as Peelipose, Jessy's Father
- Santhakumari as Geevarghese's Mother
- Sasi Kalinga as Narayanan Master
- Sunil Sukhada as Fr. Gabriel
- Sudheer Karamana as Mathews
- Jeethu Joseph in a cameo
- Nayanthara as Swapna (cameo), whom Josutty finally marries in the climax

== Marketing ==
The teaser of Life of Josutty released on 31 August and featured all actors in the film. Eros International's share value surged by 3.98% at the stock market, immediately after the announcement of this film. The trailer of film released on 2 September, telling that there is no twist or suspense in the film. Film's audio is released on 4 September. First video song "Mele Mele" released on 10 September.

== Reception ==
=== Critical reception ===
Upon release it received positive critical response.

Malayala Manorama rated 3.25 out of 5 stars and concluded "Josutty inspires, and in more ways than one, makes for a good structured story; something that is largely eclipsed by mass entertainers".

Rediff.com rated 3 out of 5 stars and called it "impressive" and concluded "On the whole, with Life of Josutty, director Jeethu Joseph carries on his good form that he showed in Drishyam giving Dileep one of the best characters of his career".

Bangalore Mirror rated 3.5 out of 5 stars and wrote "It is to Joseph's credit that in today's changing times he has gone ahead and presented us with a simple, slice of life tale, managing to emerge a winner to a large extent".

Indiaglitz awarded 3 out of 5 stars and said "Jeethu Joseph has once again come up with a good cinema. The makers' repeated warning that there is no twist of suspense is very much true. Its life - slow and steady like the beat of the heart".

Filmibeat.com rated 3 out of 5 stars and said "The movie falls into the slow pace with the excessive load of emotional elements and unnecessary scenes. The climax looks forced; but it may satisfy the audience who insists on a happy ending. But in a whole, Life of Josutty makes a perfect family movie".

The New Indian Express stated "The film is monotonous till the end. The flow is smooth in the first half which is made interesting with comic sequences. In the second half, it takes more time to narrate the story, hence lags".

=== Box office ===
The film released on 24 September 2015, grossed ₹9.70 crore (US$1.0 million) from all over India in 15 days, of which ₹8.80 crore (US$910,000) was collected from Kerala. The satellite right was bought by Surya TV for an amount of ₹5.5 crore (US$570,000).

== Music ==
Life of Josutty

Soundtrack album to Life of Josutty by Anil Johnson
- Released: 26 March 2015
- Genre: Feature film soundtrack
- Length: 25:32
- Language: Malayalam
- Producer: Anil Johnson

Anil Johnson chronology
Onnum Mindathe (2014)	Life of Josutty (2015)

The soundtrack is composed by Anil Johnson which comprises five songs. The singers include Shreya Ghoshal, Vijay Yesudas, Najim Arshad and Sangeetha Prabhu.

The first video song "Mele Mele" sung by Shreya Ghoshal was released in September first week. The song shows the transition of Josutty (Dileep) and Jessy (Rachana), from their childhood days to adulthood. It is penned by lyricist Santosh Varma.

No.	Title	Lyrics	Singer(s)	Length
1.	"Mele Mele (Solo)"	Santhosh Varma	Shreya Ghoshal	4:59
2.	"Ketoo Njan (Duet)"	Santhosh Varma	Najim Arshad, Sangeeta Prabhu	5:14
3.	"Kalaame"	Santhosh Varma	Vijay Yesudas	4:55
4.	"Mele Mele (Duet)"	Santhosh Varma	Shreya Ghoshal, Najim Arshad	5:00
5.	"Ketoo Njan (Solo)"	Santhosh Varma	Sangeeta Prabhu	5:14
Total length:				25:22

== Awards and nominations ==
Filmfare Awards South

- Nominated - Filmfare Award for Best Female Playback Singer – Malayalam -Shreya Ghoshal
