= Bombay March 12 =

- Promotional poster
- Directed by: Babu Janardhanan
- Written by: Babu Janardhanan
- Produced by: Haneef Muhammed
- Starring: Mammootty; Unni Mukundan; Roma
- Cinematography: Vipin Mohan
- Edited by: Vijay Shankar
- Music by: Prashant Pillai; Afzal Yusuf
- Production company: Red Rose Creations
- Distributed by: Red Rose Release; PJ Entertainments
- Release date: 30 June 2011
- Running time: 131 minutes
- Country: India
- Language: Malayalam

Bombay March 12 is a 2011 Indian Malayalam-language drama film written and directed by Babu Janardhanan in his the directorial debut. The film is based on the 1993 Bombay bomb blasts. The film stars Mammootty, Unni Mukundan and Roma. The narrative is in a hyperlink format. It was released on 30 June 2011. It was dubbed and released in Hindi as Hadsa Bombay March 12.

== Cast ==
- Mammootty as Sameer / Sanadhanan
- Unni Mukundan as Shahjahan
- Roma as Abida, Shahjahan's sister
- Sadiq as Kunju Mohammed, Shahjahan and Abida's father
- Shari as Shahjahan and Abida's mother
- Jayan Cherthala as Vasukuttan Nair
- Manikantan Pattambi
- Lal as Nissar, Intelligence officer
- Jyothi Krishna as Maya
- Sudheer Karamana as Sunil, ATS Officer
- Lijo Jose Pellissery as Terrorist
- Chemban Vinod Jose as Kasim, Police Officer
- Irshad as Iqbal, Abida's brother-in-law
- Saranya Sasi as Abida and Shajahan's sister
- Anil Murali as Jeevan, Police Officer
- Kochu Preman as Narayan Nair
- Rajeev Pillai as Mushuruf
- Balachandran Chullikkadu

== Production ==
=== Casting ===
Unni Mukundan (Krishna), who plays a major supporting role in Bombay March 12, was formerly working as an assistant to veteran director A. K. Lohithadas. Model-turned-child artiste Babydiya makes her film debut with Bombay March 12.

=== Filming ===
Production commenced on second week of February 2011 and was completed from Coimbatore, Mumbai, Hyderabad and parts of Kerala and Rajasthan. Originally filmed in Malayalam, it will have dubbed releases in Tamil and Telugu. It was rumored that Bombay March 12 would be simultaneously shot in Hindi.

== Music ==
Bombay March 12 features an original score composed by Prashant Pillai.

The soundtrack to Bombay March 12 is composed by Afzal Yusuf. Sonu Nigam and Sadhana Sargam sang songs for the film. The song titled "Chakkaramavin Kombathu" has lyrics by Rafeeq Ahmed.

=== Track listing ===
All lyrics are written by Rafeeq Ahmed.

No.	Title	Singer(s)	Length
1.	"Chakkara Maavin"	Sonu Nigam, Ganesh Sundaram
2.	"Viriyunnu"	Sadhana Sargam
3.	"Onaveyil"	M. G. Sreekumar, Soney Sai, Sudheesh
4.	"Maula Mere"	Kailash Kher
5.	"Chakkara Maavin"	Sonu Nigam, Soney Sai, Ganesh Sundaram
6.	"Viriyunnu"	Usha Uthup

== Critical reception ==
Bombay March 12 received positive reviews upon release. Paresh C. Palicha of Rediff.com said, "Bombay March 12 is a promising debut for scriptwriter Babu Janardhanan as a director." He rated it three in a scale of five. and said "The storytelling is complicated and you need to be focused as every scene exposes yet another layer of the story, something Babu Janardhanan did as a writer in the Lijo Jose Pellissery directed City of God. But there is always a niggling thought at the back of our minds that the point he is trying to make – that 'one bad egg can spoil the whole basket' – could have been conveyed just as well in a more simple and linear narrative." Mammootty's performance is appreciated as "one of his most subdued roles in recent times". According to Palicha, Unni Mukundan as Shahjahan "does full justice to the confidence that the director has reposed in him."
