= Lily (2023 film) =

- Theatrical release poster
- Directed by: Sivam
- Produced by: K Babu Reddy; G Satish Kumar
- Starring: Baby Neha; Baby Pranitha Reddy; Master Vedanth Varma
- Cinematography: Rajkumar
- Edited by: Lokesh Kumar Kadali
- Music by: Anto Francis
- Release date: 7 July 2023
- Country: India
- Language: Telugu

Lily is a 2023 Indian Telugu-language children's film directed by Sivam in his directorial debut. The film was announced and promoted as the first film in the genre to have a pan-Indian release. It stars Neha, Pranitha Reddy, Vedanth, Rajveer in the lead roles; the cast also includes Rajeev Pillai in a special appearance. It was produced by K Babu Reddy and G Sathish Kumar under Gopuram Studios.

== Plot ==
Of her group of friends, including Lily and Vedanth, Divya is the only orphan. Her foster mother, Deva, lives poorly. When Divya is taken to a hospital after having fainted, and diagnosed with leukemia, her friends and Deva wonder how they will afford the costs of her treatment.

== Cast ==
- Neha as Lily
- Pranitha Reddy as Divya
- Vedanth as Vedanth
- Rajveer as Deva
- Michelle Shah as Dr.Aparna
- Rajeev Pillai as Rajeev

== Promotion ==
Dil Raju launched the Telugu trailer of the film on 13 March 2023 in Hyderabad. Ragini Dwivedi launched the Kannada trailer on 23 March.

== Release ==
The film was released in five languages (Telugu, Tamil, Kannada, Malayalam and Hindi).

== Reception ==
The film received very mixed reviews at Sakshi. The director stated the film was receiving good response and that he aimed to show it to students of all schools in India.
