= DNA (2024 film) =

Indian action thriller film

- Directed by: T. S. Suresh Babu
- Written by: A.K. Santhosh
- Produced by: K.V. Abdul Nasar
- Starring: Ashkar Saudan; Raai Laxmi; Hannah Reji Koshy
- Cinematography: Ravichandran
- Edited by: Johnkutty
- Music by: Sharreth
- Production company: Benzy Productions
- Release date: 14 June 2024
- Country: India
- Language: Malayalam

DNA is a 2024 Malayalam language action thriller film written by A.K. Santhosh and directed by T.S. Suresh Babu featuring Ashkar Saudan, Riyaz Khan and Babu Antony. The film has cinematography by Ravichandran, editing by Johnkutty, and music by Sharreth, while KV Abdul Nazar has produced the film under the banner of Benzy Productions.

== Premise ==
A prolific murderer begins taking lives. To discover out, a female investigator and her crew start an inquiry. At last, the murderer-who nobody was suspecting-is apprehended. His reasons for killing were personal revenge.

== Cast ==
- Ashkar Saudan as RJ Lakshmi Narayanan
- Raai Laxmi as IG Raichel Punnoose IPS, Commissioner of Police Kochi City
- Hannah Reji Koshy as RJ Hanna Alexander, Lakshmi Narayan' s friend
- Swasika as Merlin Charlie
- Aju Varghese as Gopinath Menon
- Riyaz Khan as Peter John Vinayakam
- Sudheer Sukumaran as Charlie
- John Kaippallil as Mukundan
- Padmaraj Ratheesh as DYSP Anand Raj
- Raveendran as Dr. Raymond D’Cunha, Psychologist & Forensic Surgeon
- Irshad as CI Eldho Varkey
- Ravi Venkatraman as CI Ramamurthy, Tamil Nadu Police
- Rajendran as Constable Anbumani, Ramamurthy's assistant, Tamil Nadu Police
- Babu Antony as DCP Mujeeb Rahman IPS
- Kalabhavan Shajohn as Inspector Issac Vattaparambil
- Ineya as Naila Vincent
- Kottayam Nazeer as SI Sreejith
- Kunchan as Antony
- Idavela Babu as Eenasu
- Suresh Menon as Ranga
- Renji Panicker as DGP Martin Aloshius IPS
- Shaji Chen as Home Minister Rajan Kurian
- Senthil Krishna as Sunil
- Shivani Bhai as Revathi
- Seetha as Amrutha
- Sudev Nair as Prashanth
- Kailash
- Rahul Ravi as Parthi
- Gowri Nandha as Gayathri/Saroja
- Saleema as Paati

== Production ==
In mid-February 2023, actress Honey Rose was announced to essay the lead role in the upcoming film DNA, but later made the return of actress Raai Laxmi to the Malayalam industry portraying a role of an IPS officer Rachael Punnoose IG after 6 years, who was last seen in Oru Kuttanadan Blog (2018). The film stars Ashkar Saudan in the lead role, alongside the return prominent Tamil actress Sukanya to Malayalam who was last seen in Aamayum Muyalum (2014) now as a lyricist. The film has cinematography by Ravichandran, editing by John Kutty, and music by Sharreth, while KV Abdul Nazar has produced the film under the banner of Benzy Productions.

== Release and reception ==
DNA released in theatres on 14 June 2024.

Rohit Panikker of Times Now gave 3/5 stars and wrote "This film scores points for its ability to keep the audience engaged, and deliver a satisfying pay-off in the end."
