= Laughing Villa =

- Title card
- Genre: Comedy talk show Comedy reality show Comedy chat show
- Written by: William P Chacko; Shiju Anjumana
- Presented by: Navya Nair; Jyothi Krisna; Gayatri Arun
- Theme music composer: Balagopal
- Composer: Sree Vasanth (lyrics) Pradeep Palluruthy (Singer)
- Country of origin: India
- Original language: Malayalam
- No. of seasons: 03

Production
- Producers: Abitha Pullath; Syam S Namboothiri sabareesh Drishya; Anupam; Aneesh
- Editor: Anandu Krishna
- Running time: 60 minutes

Original release
- Network: Surya TV
- Release: 30 July 2016 – 17 November 2019

Laughing Villa is an Indian Malayalam celebrity comedy chat show which premiered on Surya TV from 30 July 2016 to 17 November 2019.

The first season of the show was hosted by south-Indian film actors Navya Nair and Maniyanpilla Raju. The show also cast Surabhi Lakshmi, Manju Pillai, Naseer Sankranthi and Noby Marcose as character artists.

Surya TV launched the second season of show from 2 April 2017 in a new format as a kids reality show. Jyothi Krishna hosts the show.

Surya TV launched the third season of show from 18 May 2018 as movie promotion talk show. Gayathri Arun hosts the show.

== Concept ==
=== Season 1 ===
The show consists of different segments where the celebrities plays the quiz games by Mr.X which is starred by the popular comedian-turned-actor Noby Marcose. The show started to telecast 30 July 2016 .

=== Season 2 ===
The kids' team of Laughing Villa season 2 is supported by Surabhi Lakshmi and Kishor. Laughing Villa season 2 is opened by Suraj Venjaramoodu. The kids' team performances which include skits, film scoops and special performances are judged by guest celebrities. The show launched on 2 April 2017 and is hosted by Jyothi Krishna and from January 2018 show is hosted by television actress Gayathri Arun for a short span. It has a format similar to Junior Super Star.

=== Season 3 ===
On 18 May 2018 the show launched as a movie promotion show along with skits by kids from television and film industries. The show is hosted by television actress Gayathri Arun.

== Cast ==
=== Cast season 1 ===
- Main cast
  - Maniyanpilla Raju as Owner of Laughing Villa/Rajuettan
  - Navya Nair as Sister of Rajuettan
  - Manju Pillai as Wife of Rajuettan
  - Surabhi Lakshmi as PA of Navya Nair/Suru
  - Naseer Sankranthi as Various roles/sankranthiri
- Supporting cast
  - Noby Marcose as Mr.X
  - Devi Chandana
  - Kochu Preman
  - Subbalakshmi as Muttashi
  - Lakshmi Priya
  - Sethulakshmi amma
  - Abu Salim
  - Vinod Kovoor

=== Cast season 2 ===
- Host
  - 2017 - Jyothi Krishna
  - 2018 - Gayathri Arun (few episodes)
  - 2018 - Jyothi Krishna
- Mentors
  - Surabhi Lakshmi
  - Kishore

=== Cast season 3 ===
- Host
  - Gayatri Arun
- Other cast
  - Sneha Sreekumar as various roles
