= Government Polytechnic Nainital =

Govt. Polytechnic, Nainital (Previously known as Nainital Polytechnic, Nainital)
- Motto: Providing Technical Education in Multi Engg. Branch.
- Established: 1958
- Location: Nainital, India
- Website: www.gpnainital.org

Government Polytechnic Nainital (previously known as Nainital Polytechnic Nainital) is a technical education institute located at Nainital, Uttarakhand. Established in 1975, the institute is affiliated from Uttarakhand Technical Education Board, Roorkee and All India Council For Technical Education, New Delhi.

Courses offered by institute are Civil Engineering, Computer Application, Electrical Engineering, Electronics Engineering, Information Tech., Mechanical Engineering, Modern Office Mgt. & Sec. Prac., and Pharmacy. Before Uttarakhand Technical Education Board, Roorkee affiliation Institute was affiliated from UP Technical Board, Lucknow.

Govt. Polytechnic, Nainital was in those few Polytechnics established at Uttarakhand.

== Principles ==
1.Present Mr. P.R.Patel
