= Mizhi Randilum =

2003 film directed by Ranjith

- Directed by: Ranjith
- Written by: Ranjith
- Produced by: Augustine
- Starring: Kavya Madhavan; Indrajith; Dileep
- Narrated by: Ranjith
- Cinematography: Alagappan N
- Edited by: Ranjan Abraham
- Music by: Songs: Raveendran; Background Score: Johnson
- Distributed by: Rajashri Films; Penra Arts; Ambalakara Films
- Release date: 31 October 2003
- Country: India
- Language: Malayalam

Mizhi Randilum (English: In both Eyes) is a 2003 Malayalam romantic drama film written and directed by Ranjith, starring Kavya Madhavan, Indrajith Sukumaran, Jagathy Sreekumar, Sukumari, Dileep, and Revathi. The movie was actor Narendra Prasad's last film.

== Plot ==
Bhadra is a nurse who is living with her widowed mother, grandmother, and twin sister, Bhama, a medical student. Her older brother Achuthankutty is a politician. Bhadra falls in love with Arun, a doctor who works with her. Arun has a Muslim father and a Hindu mother who agrees to have Bhadra as their daughter-in-law. Achuthankutty hates him because his father is a Muslim, causing Arun and Bhadra to break up.

Meanwhile, Achuthankutty has troubles with a ruthless businessman and moneylender named Krishnakumar who forces him to sell the family house to him. Bhadra and Bhama are left to be taken care of by their sister-in-law. She meets Krishakumar's sister, Sridevi, who was paralyzed after the death of their parents. Krishnakumar falls in love with Bhadra owing to her simplicity and proceeds to marry her. Bhadra's life takes a tragic turn when Arun commits suicide, and Bhadra goes into mental shock. Krishnakumar decides to take care of the traumatized Bhadra and later marry her.

The story has a positive ending where Bhadra is seen telling Krishnakumar that she is pregnant.

== Cast ==
- Kavya Madhavan in dual role as :
  - Thechikkattu Bhadra,(Voiceover by Praveena)
  - Thechikkattu Bhama
- Indrajith as Dr. Arun
- Dileep as Krishnakumar
- Jagathy Sreekumar as Thechikkattu Achuthankutti, Bhadra's and Bhama's elder brother
- Sukumari as Shantha, Bhadra's and Bhama's Mother
- Revathi as Sridevi, Krishnakumar's elder sister
- Vijayakumari as Yasodara
- Narendra Prasad as Bappuji
- Janardhanan as Thampi
- Siddique as Menon
- Sai Kumar asR . V
- Kunchan as Vasu
- Shobha Mohan as Devi
- Kalpana as Sarada
- Zeenath as Vathsala Koshy
- Augustine as Bichu
- Sadiq
- Abu Salim as Santosh, Sarada's Husband
- Meena Ganesh as Devaki
- Santha Devi as grandmother
- V. K. Sreeraman
- C V Dev as Uncle's Right Hand

== Release ==
The film was released on 31 October 2003.

=== Box office ===
The film received positive reviews from the critics.

== Soundtrack ==
The film's soundtrack contains six songs, all composed by Raveendran, with lyrics by Sarath Vayalar. All the songs are evergreen hits.

#	Title	Singer(s)	Raga(s)
1	"Aalilathaaliyumaay"	P. Jayachandran	Shuddha Saveri
2	"Enthinaay Nin"	K. S. Chitra	Sumaneesha Ranjani
3	"Omane"	K. J. Yesudas, Sujatha Mohan	Kalyani
4	"Omane" (M)	K. J. Yesudas	Kalyani
5	"Vaarmazhaville"	K. S. Chitra	Kamboji
6	"Vaarmazhaville" (M)	Srinivas	Kamboji
