= Mahesh (Malayalam actor) =

Indian actor

- Born: Tanzania
- Occupation: actor
- Years active: 1984–present
- Spouse: Hema
- Children: Malavika Nair, Meghna Nair
- Parents: P K Padmanabhan Nair (father); P Padmakumari (mother)

Mahesh is an Indian actor in Malayalam films and television serials. He started his movie career as a hero and later shifted his focus to negative roles and then supporting roles in Television series.

== Career ==
He started his career as an assistant director for the director J. Sasikumar in the early 1980s. Then he worked as an associate director for 16 Malayalam movies with different leading directors. Later he turned to the acting career. He first acted in the movie Mudra, directed by Sibi Malayil in 1989 at the age of 23. He went on to act in classic movies like Mrugaya, Sadayam Vyooham, etc. He took a break in the late 1999s and went to United States and settled there. He made a comeback in 2006 and directed a Malayalam movie in 2008; Calendar, with Prithviraj Sukumaran, Zarina Wahab and Navya Nair in the lead. He did story, screenplay and dialogue for the Malayalam movie Ashwaroodan. Currently he is active in direction for Malayalam films.

== Personal life ==
He was born to P. K. Padmanabhan Nair and Padmakumari in Tanzania, though he originally hails from Thiruvananthapuram. His father was working for the British government in Tanganyika, then he moved back to India in the early 1970s. They settled down in Alappuzha near to Udaya Studio, which attracted him to the film industry. He had his primary education from St. Joseph's Higher Secondary School, Pulinkunnoo and graduation in Bcom from S.D.(Sanatana Dharma College), Alappuzha. His father died when he was eleven years old.

He is married to Hema. They have two daughters, Malavika and Meghna. He currently resides at Tripunithura. His elder daughter Malavika married Ajay Nair, a senior sub-editor for Sky news, in September 2021. They are settled in UK.

== Filmography ==
=== As an actor ===
==== Malayalam ====
Year	Title	Role	Notes
1989	Mrugaya	Thomaskutty	
1989	Mudra	Babu	
1989	News	Roy Jacob	
1989	Shilpi		
1990	Purappadu		
1990	Commander		
1990	Vyooham	Kishore	
1990	Marupuram	Binoy's friend	
1990	Ponnaranjaanam	Vinod	
1990	Vembanaad		
1991	Arangu	Vineeth Menon	
1991	Parallel College	Ashok	
1991	Cheppukilukkana Changathi		
1991	Kuttapathram	Mahesh	
1992	Priyapetta Kukku		
1992	Sadayam	Vijayan	
1992	Chevaliyar Michael		
1992	Soorya Chakram		
1992	Neelakkurukkan		
1992	Kaazhchaykkappuram		
1992	Kakkatholaayiram		
1992	Kasarkode Khaderbai	Jayan	
1993	Uppukandam Brothers	Ettuveettil Sunil	
1993	Padhavi		
1993	Aacharyan	Jeevan Kumar	
1993	City Police	Jayan	
1994	Kambolam		
1994	Ponthan Mada	Rameshan	
1994	Sudhinam	School Manager	
1994	Simhavaalan Menon	Arun Nambiar	
1994	Dollar		
1994	Sukham Sukhakaram		
1994	Njaan Kodeeshwaran	Vijayan	
1994	Mimics Action 500	Rajan Thampan	
1995	Special Squad	Martin	
1995	Kidilol Kidilam		
1995	Thirumanassu		
1995	Minnaminuginum Minnukettu		
1995	Tom & Jerry	Ramanan	
1996	Man of the Match		
1996	Mimics Super 1000		
1996	Sulthan Hyderali		
1996	KL-7-95- Eranakulam North		
1997	Kalyana Unnikal	Krishnanunni	
1997	Moonukodiyum Munnurupavanum		
1997	Poothumbiyum Poovalanmarum		
1997	Irattakuttikalude Achan		
1997	Oral Mathram	Hameed	
1998	Achamakuttiyude Achayan		
1998	Gloria Fernandes From U.S.A.		
1999	Auto Brothers		
2001	Soothradharan		
2006	Chakkara Muthu	Ravi	
2008	Malabar Wedding		
2008	Best Friends		
2008	Twenty:20		Video Archive
2009	Calendar		
2010	Puthumukhangal	John	
2010	Sakudumbam Shyamala		
2010	Again Kasargod Khader Bhai		Video archive
2011	Uppukandam Brothers: Back in Action		Video archive
2012	Last Bench	Rejimon	
2012	Masters		
2012	101 Weddings		
2012	Face2Face	Raghuprasad	
2012	Second Innings		
2012	White Paper		
2012	Manthrikan		
2013	Lokpal	Tomichan	
2013	Omega.exe		
2013	Geethaanjali	Koshy	
2014	The Dolphins		
2016	Marubhoomiyile Aana		
2016	Ore Mukham		
2016	Kattappanayile Rithwik Roshan	Geo's father	
2017	Honey Bee 2: Celebrations		
2017	Lakshyam		
2017	Kala Viplavom Rashtreeyam		Cameo
2017	Honey Bee 2.5		
2017	Angarajiyathile Ginmanmmaar		
2017	Ayaal Jeevichirippundu		
2018	Vallikudilile Vellakkaran		
2018	Theater		
2018	Wonder Boys		
2018	Vikadakumaran	Renjith	
2019	Janaadhipan		
2019	Orma		
2019	Oru Yamandan Premakadha		
2019	Kottayam		
2020	Ellom		
2022	Upacharapoorvam Gunda Jayan		
2022	Eesho		
2022	Sheela		
2022	Autorickshawkarante Bharya		
2023	Garudan	Judge	
2024	Kurukku		

==== Tamil ====
Year	Title	Role	Notes
2016	Reengaara Oosai		Also director and writer

==== Hindi ====
Year	Title	Role	Notes
1986	Jaal		
1991	Galat Sambandh		
1992	Shauqeen Haseena		

==== Kannada ====
Year	Title	Role	Notes
2023	Sheela		

=== Story ===
- Ashwaroodan (2007)
- Calendar (2009)

=== Direction ===
- Street Of Harmony (documentary) (2004) (Won the New York film award in documentary category 2005.)
- Calendar (2009)
- Paarkathonnume Unmayalli (2011)
- Reengaara Oosai (Tamil) (2016) (Won special jury award for environmental friendly movie at Goa international Film festival 2022.)

=== Dialogue ===
- Ashwaroodan (2007)

=== Screenplay ===
- Ashwaroodan (2007)
- Reengaara Oosai (2016)

== Television ==
Year	Serial	Channel	Notes
1988	Nezhelyoudham	DD Malayalam	Serial debut
2007	Pavithra Jailelannu	Asianet	Return to serials
2007	Swami Ayyappan	Asianet	
2008	Mounanombaram	Kairali TV	
2008-2011	Paarijatham	Asianet	
2009	Vigraham	Asianet	
2010	Rahasyam	Asianet	
2012	Kadhyile Raajakumari	Mazhavil Manorama	
2012	Agniputhri	Asianet	
2012	Achante Makkal	Surya TV	
2012	Snehakoodu	Surya TV	
2014	Amma Manasam	Surya TV	
2014	Ganga	DD Malayalam	
2014	Ithalukal	Amrita TV	
2014-2015	Balaganapathy	Asianet	Asianet television award 2015 for best Character actor (Special Jury)
2015	Arayikkal Bivi	Sakhi TV	
2015	Junior Chanakyan	Flowers TV	
2015	Sthreedhanam	Asianet	
2015	My.Marumakan	Surya TV	
2015	Kalyanasougandhikam	Asianet	
2016	Jagratha	Amrita TV	
2016-2017	Sathyam Shivam Sundaram	Amrita TV	
2017	Ennu Swantham Jani	Surya TV	
2017-2018	Mamankam	Flowers TV	
2017-2018	Parishudhan	Flowers TV	
2018–2019	Bhagyajathakam	Mazhavil Manorama	
2019–2020	Pournami Thinkal	Asianet	
2019-2020	Bhadra	Surya TV	
2020	Koodathayi	Flowers TV	
2021–2022	Priyankari	Flowers TV	
2021–2022	KaanaKanmani	Surya TV	
2024–present	Madhura Nombara Kattu	Zee Keralam	
2024–present	Meenu's Kitchen	Mazhavil Manorama	Ilayidam Thirumeni (Guest Artist - Episode 1)
