= City of God (2011 film) =

2011 film directed by Lijo Jose Pellissery

- Theatrical release poster
- Directed by: Lijo Jose Pellissery
- Written by: Babu Janardhanan
- Produced by: Anitha Anil Mathew
- Starring: Prithviraj Sukumaran; Indrajith Sukumaran; Rohini Raghuvaran; Parvathy Thiruvothu; Rajeev Pillai; Rima Kallingal; Swetha Menon
- Narrated by: Prithviraj Sukumaran
- Cinematography: Sujith Vaassudev
- Edited by: Manoj
- Music by: Prashant Pillai
- Production company: Mary Matha Creations
- Distributed by: AP International
- Release date: 23 April 2011 (India)
- Running time: 145 minutes
- Country: India
- Language: Malayalam

City of God is a 2011 Indian Malayalam-language crime thriller film directed by Lijo Jose Pellissery and written by Babu Janardhanan. It tells the story of Tamil migrant workers and a team of land mafia gangsters in the city of Kochi, Kerala. It stars Prithviraj Sukumaran, Indrajith Sukumaran, Rajeev Pillai, Rohini, Parvathy Thiruvothu, Rima Kallingal and Swetha Menon.

The film uses the hyperlink cinema format as its narrative structure, a technique first used by Satyajit Ray in his film Kanchenjungha (1962). City of God is not a remake and shares no resemblance to the 2002 Brazilian film of the same name, although both use non-linear narrative structure. The film was subsequently dubbed and released in Hindi under the same name by Wide Angle Media in 2014.

City of God was one of the first among the "Malayalam New Wave" films, although the trend was just becoming recognised during 2011. Despite getting critical acclaim, the film was an average venture at the box office.

== Plot ==
City of God begins with a road accident and the story traces the life of the four families who are associated with the accident. Each family has a different perspective on the city of Kochi.

The first story revolves around the life of Tamil migrants. One of them named Swarnavel has a special affection towards another migrant named Marathakam. Marathakam was already married, but she had run away from her husband in Pollachi due to his unbearable torture. Marathakam and Swarnavel know that they love each other, but they don't show it. Because of some personal benefits, Lakshmi breaks their relationship and forces Marathakam to marry another migrant. On the night of the marriage, Marathakam learns that her new husband is a thief and returns to Swarnavel. They realize that their love is mutual and start living together. The second husband gets stricken with envy, where he takes revenge by bringing the first husband from Pollachi. The following day, Swarnavel rescues Marathakam from her husband and tries to escape on a moped; they have an accident, but survive. Swarnavel and Marathakam escape from the scene and settle down in a scenic village with Marathakam's son, thereby living happily ever after.

The second story deals with the life of real estate dealer Sony and his forehand Jyothi Lal. As per the instructions of Sony, Jyothi Lal and his gang kill a plot owner, who is the husband of Viji Punnose. Viji Punnosse identifies her husband's murderer as Jyothi Lal and associates with another businessman Shamir to plot revenge and destroy Sony and Jyothi Lal. Viji promises to marry Shamir if he can kill Jyothi Lal and Sony by arranging it with another gang. Sony has an eye on the growing actress Surya Prabha. Surya is leading an unpleasant married life with Mehaboob, who is a friend and later business partner of Sony. With the intention of collecting Surya Prabha, Sony cheats Mehaboob in the construction business; the police remand Mehaboob for the inadequate and unsafe construction practices which had caused the death of the Tamil migrant Lakshmi.

Sony forces Surya to have an illicit relation to get the papers that prove her husband's innocence. Jyothi Lal rescues Surya from this predicament and from a suicide attempt. Jyothi Lal takes Surya to Sony's guest house to collect the papers and they pick up Sony on the way. However, their vehicle is in the same accident which Swarnavel and Marathakam had, and Sony dies at the scene of the accident. The gang arranged by Shamir and Viji Punnoose arrives at the accident and tries to kill Jyothi Lal, but Jyothi Lal escapes with Surya and they began to realise the importance of each other in their future life, while Viji marries Shamir and goes to Dubai for further business.

== Cast ==
- Prithviraj Sukumaran as Jyothi Lal, a goon and the right-hand man of Sony.
- Indrajith Sukumaran as Swarnavel, a migrant Tamil construction worker who lives in Kochi.
- Rajeev Pillai as Sony Vadayaatil, a wealthy real estate dealer who has involvement in illegal activities.
- Rohini as Lakshmi, a Tamil construction worker in Kochi and friend of Marathakam.
- Parvathy Thiruvothu as Marathakam, a Tamil woman who flees her village to escape from her abusive husband.
- Swetha Menon as Viji Punnose, a Dubai-based wealthy businesswoman who is forced to stay in Kerala after her husband gets murdered.
- Rima Kallingal as Surya Prabha, an actress who is in some disturbed relationships.
- Arun Narayan as Shamir, a land mafia party
- Rajesh Hebbar as Punnose, a businessman and husband of Viji.
- Jagadish as Circle Inspector (C.I.) Pavamani.
- Anil Murali as Podiyadi Soman
- Sreehari as Babychan
- Kishore Sathya as Mehboob
- Sudheer Karamana as Nachimuthu
- Chemban Vinod Jose as Marathakam's husband
- Baby Ajai as Son Of Marathakam

== Soundtrack ==
Prashant Pillai scored the musical score and soundtrack. Three songs are in Tamil, two in Malayalam and one in Hindi. The musical score is known for its experimental approach and its dark theme, where it received wide attention from critics and moviegoers.

== Release ==
The film had a delayed release on 23 April 2011.

== Reception ==
=== Critical response ===
City of God received positive reviews from critics.

Veeyen of Nowrunning gave 3/5 stars and wrote "City of God is no City of Dreams. It's a raw and bleeding city that wails all night and day. A city where en eternal eclipse has cast a shadow over the rights and wrongs. A city where God has apparently deserted his illusory throne and vanished without a trace." Indiaglitz gave 3.5/5 stars and wrote "City of God is a movie with feelings and appeal for the proponents of differently made experimental cinema. Director Lijo, Anil Mathew and their crew needs to be applauded for the efforts in keeping away cliches and commercial thrusts on the narrative structure, though they may find it a little difficult to cruise in the box-office." Rediff gave 3/5 stars and wrote "Overall, City of God is a good watch when compared to the senseless stuff we have endured in this holiday season."
