= Rajesh Sharma =

Rajesh Sharma may refer to:

- Rajesh Sharma (actor) (born 1971), Indian film actor
- Rajesh Sharma (Malayalam actor) (born 1973), Indian film actor
- Rajesh Sharma (cricketer) (born 1995), Indian cricketer
- Rajesh Kumar Sharma (born 1978), Indian politician
