= Lisammayude Veedu =

2013 film directed by Babu Janardhanan

- Film poster
- Directed by: Babu Janardhanan
- Written by: Babu Janardhanan
- Produced by: P. T. Saleem
- Starring: Meera Jasmine; Rahul Madhav; Salim Kumar
- Cinematography: Sinu Sidharth
- Edited by: Sobin K Soman
- Music by: Deepankuran
- Production company: Green Advertising
- Release date: 4 January 2013
- Country: India
- Language: Malayalam

Lisammayude Veedu (English: Lisamma's House) is a 2013 Indian Malayalam-language drama film written and directed by Babu Janardhanan. The film stars Meera Jasmine, Rahul Madhav, and Salim Kumar. It is a sequel to the 2006 film Achanurangatha Veedu. The film was initially titled Samuvelinte Makkal but was later renamed Lisammayude Veedu based on the central character's name.

== Plot summary ==
Achanurangaatha Veedu (2006) told the story of a father's suffering as his under-aged daughter, Lisamma, is kidnapped and forced into a sex racket. In Lisammayude Veedu, the young girl, Lisamma, has grown up and seems to have adjusted to her past. She runs a telephone booth and looks after her two sisters and her father who has lost his mental balance after seeing his daughter suffer.

She, however, looks at life with a caustic sense of humour and has become worldly-wise. Her brave attitude wins her an admirer in Shivankutty, who is a head load worker and has communist ideals. He also acts as a strongman for his party when required.

The two get married and life is good for Lisamma as she gives birth to a baby boy. When the child is four years old, Shivankutty's past catches up with him and is killed by his enemies.

The film comments on current situations, is critical of the leftist ideology, and espouses the theory that what goes around comes around.

== Cast ==
- Meera Jasmine as Lisamma Samuel
- Rahul Madhav as Sivankutty/Arjun Sivankutty
- Master Navaneeth Madhav as Childhood of Arjun
- Salim Kumar as Samuel/Prabhakaran
- Jagadeesh as Utthaman
- Baiju as Rajappan Uduma
- Gopu Nair
- P. Sreekumar as Cherkalam Hamza
- Sudheer Karamana as Antappan
- Johny Antony as Himself
- V. K. Sreeraman
- Sangeetha Mohan as Tressa Samuel
- Anu Joseph as Sherly Samuel
- Renjusha Menon
- Murali as Shekharan Nair (Cameo Appearance)
- T. S. Raju as Thomas Mathew (Cameo Appearance)
- Prasanth as Tommy Kunjariya (Cameo Appearance)
- Manikandan Pattambi as Maniyappan (Cameo Appearance)
- Vishnupriya (Cameo Appearance)

== Reception ==
A critic from The Times of India wrote that "Lisammayude Veedu is a well-intended film stuffed with lot of hope and earnestness".
