= Vayalar Sarath Chandra Varma =

Malayalam lyricist and poet

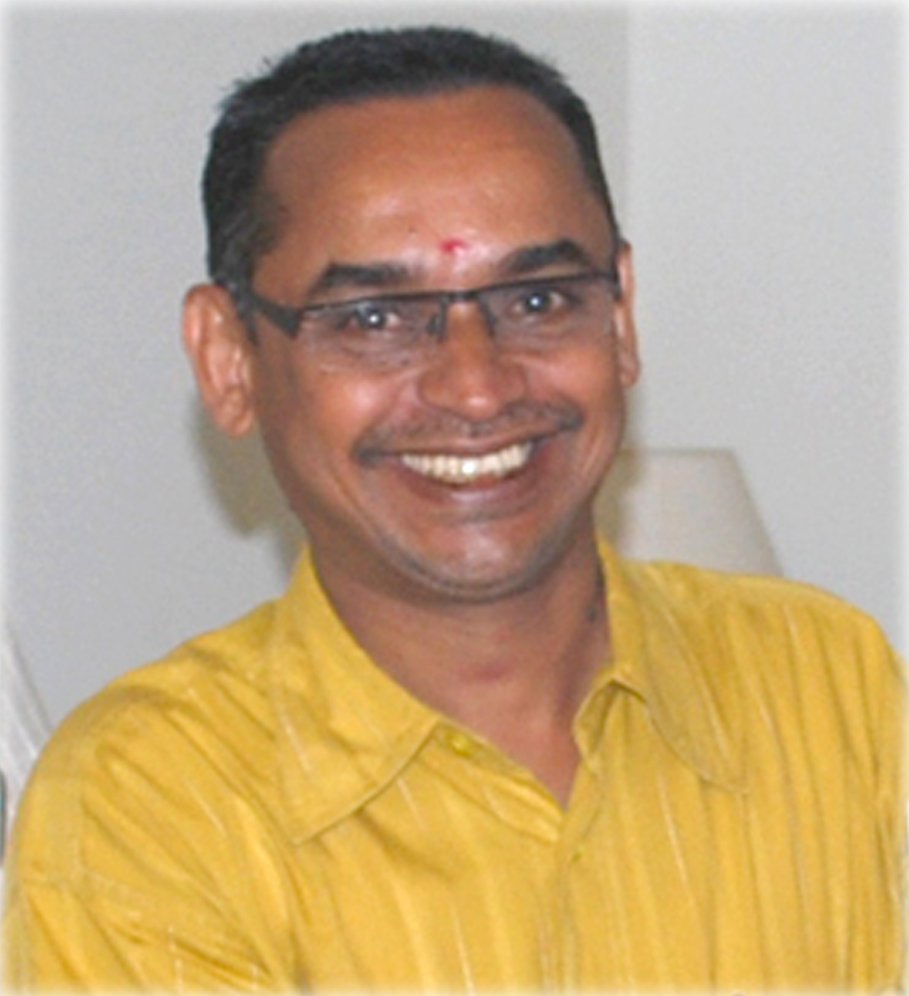
- Sarath in 2010
- Born: 12 February 1960 (age 66); Vayalar, Alappuzha, Kerala, India
- Education: Mar Ivanios College
- Occupation: Lyricist
- Years active: 1992–present
- Works: Full list
- Spouse: Sreelatha
- Father: Vayalar Ramavarma
- Awards: 2003 & 2009 Asianet Film Award for Best Lyricist

Vayalar Sarath Chandra Varma (born 12 February 1960) is a Malayalam lyricist and poet. He is the son of Malayalam poet and lyricist late Vayalar Ramavarma. He made his debut in the Malayalam film industry through the 1990 Malayalam movie Ente ponnu Thamburan which was directed by AT. Abu and music was composed by G. Devarajan.

== Life and career ==
Sarath was born to Vayalar Ramavarma and Bharathy Thamburatty in Vayalar village in Alapuzha district of Kerala. His father was a popular Malayalam lyricist. He was the eldest of the four children of his parents, followed by three younger sisters named Indulekha, Yamuna and Sindhu (died on 30 May 2021). He studied at St. Xavier's College, Thumba, Trivandrum and attended Mar Ivanious College, Thiruvanathampuram for graduation and was elected as college magazine editor. After completing his degree, he took a job at a distillery near Cherthala.

It was a stage in his life when his father had died and the family was undergoing a lot of hardships. After his father's death the Vayalar Trust was set up in fond memory of his father. Sarath's turning point came after he lost his job. His second sister's wedding was fixed and his grandmother was critically ill, and he was unable to go to the office for a long time. This led to his termination and his grandmother too had died then and the wedding was over too. As he was jobless, he was totally immersed in reading his father's works. However, one day he scribbled some lines which came out from his imagination, and it sounded good to him. He sent those works to singer K.J.Yesudas and the singer accepted his work. His lyrics were set to music by Alleppey Ranganath and appeared in the 10th volume of Ayyappa songs in 1990. Thus, Sarath started his journey in writing songs. Later, he debuted in films through the film 'Ente Ponnuthamburan', released in 1992. That film had four songs composed by G. Devarajan and Mohan sithara. But his career had a break only through the film 'Mizhi Randilum' which was directed by Rajith and the music was composed by Raveendran all of the songs in the film became iconic. He currently works in the songwriting field, having written about 508 songs from 174 movies. He is married to Sreelatha and they have a daughter Subadra.

== Awards ==
- 2012 - Nominated—SIIMA Award for Best Lyricist for "Azhalinte" - Ayalum Njanum Thammil
- 2011 - P. Bhaskaran Award
- 2009 - Asianet Film Award for Best Lyricist -Neelathaamara
- 2003 - Asianet Film Award for Best Lyricist -Mizhi Randilum
