= Babu Janardhanan =

Indian screenwriter and film director

- Born: Babu Janardhanan; Changanassery, Kerala, India
- Occupations: screenwriter, film director
- Years active: 1990 - present
- Children: Neelima Baburaj, Niranjan Baburaj

Babu Janardhanan is an Indian screenwriter and director, known for Malayalam films.

== Biography ==
=== Personal life ===
He was born at Changanassery, Kerala, as the son of Janardanan and Pankajakshi. Babu did his schooling at Madappally Govt. LPS and Govt. Higher Secondary School, Thrikkodithaanam and Pursued higher studies at AP School of Arts, Kottayam. He began his career as a school teacher at CPPHMHS, Ozhur, Tirur in Malappuram district.

He is married to Sheeba. The couple have two children, Neelima and Niranjan.

=== Film career ===
His debut movie was Anandavruthantham directed by P. Anil in 1990.

In 2005, Achanurangatha Veedu collected the best second movie award in the Kerala State Film Awards. Salim Kumar, who played the protagonist in the movie won the best supporting actor award. In 2006, Vaasthavam brought Prithiviraj the state award for the best actor. In 2008, Thalappavu won Lal the state award for the best actor in the Kerala State Film Awards.

== Filmography ==
=== As screenwriter only ===
Year	Film
1990	Anandavruthantham
1992	Oru Kochu Bhoomikulukkam
1994	Sudinam
1995	Manikyachembazhukka
1997	Varnapakittu
1997	Anubhoothi
1998	Panchaloham
1999	Thachiledathu Chundan
1999	Chandranudikkunna Dikhil
2000	Dreamz
2002	Chathurangam
2006	Achanurangatha Veedu
2006	Vaasthavam
2007	Avan Chandiyude Makan
2007	Heart Beats
2008	Thalappavu
2011	City of God
2013	Ithu Pathiramanal
2013	Musafir
2016	Swarna Kaduva

=== As director and writer ===
Year	Title	Notes
2011	Bombay March 12	
2013	Lisammayude Veedu	
2026	God for Sale	
2026	Gaandhi Bazaar Sunday Market	Filming
