= M. Jayachandran discography =

Discography

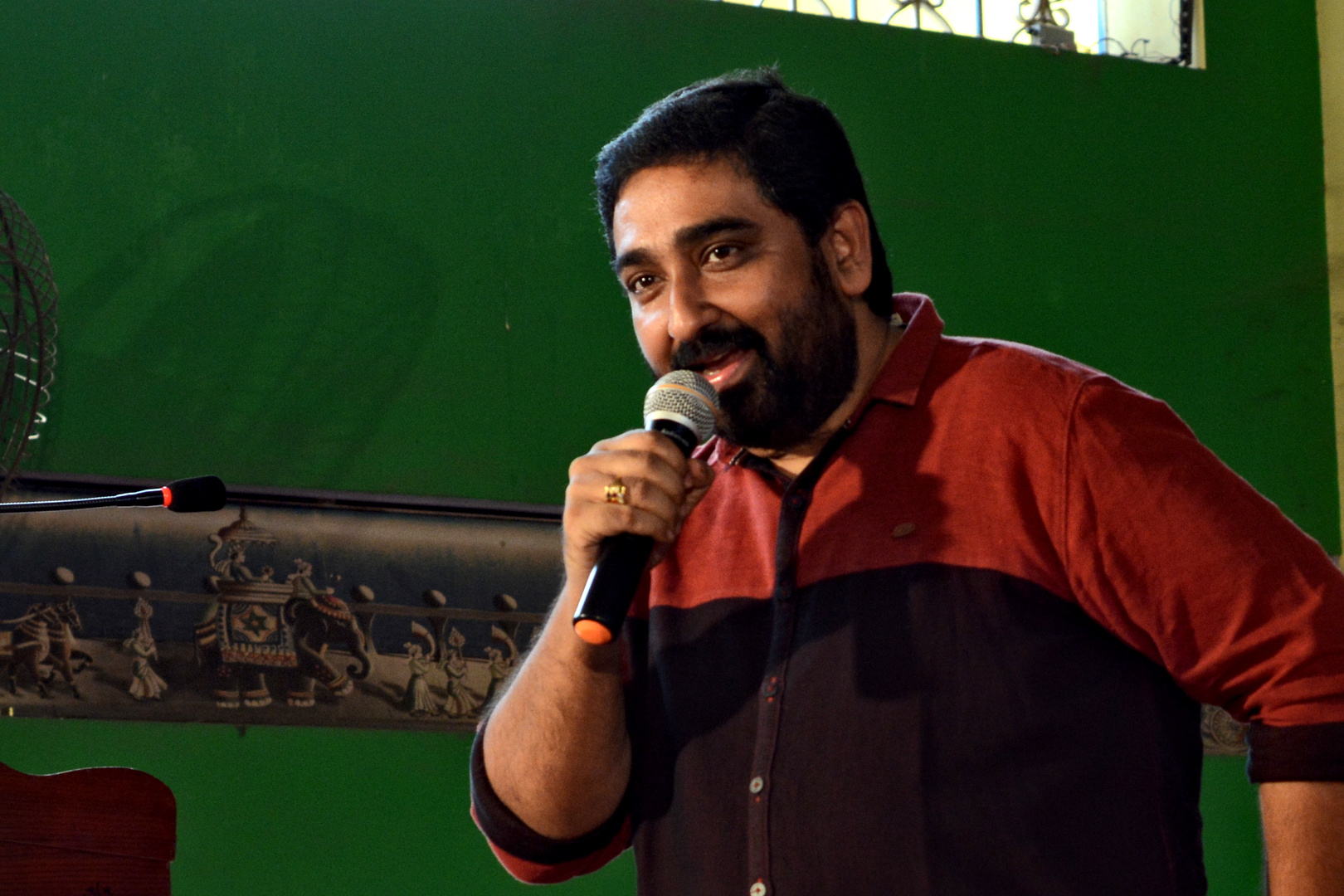
Jayachandran at University of Kerala, Kariavattom Campus in 2013

M. Jayachandran is a film score composer, singer, and musician in Indian films He has won the Kerala State Film Award for Best Music Director for a record number of seven times In 2005, he also won the state award for best male singer. In 2015, he won the National Film Award for Best Music Direction for the film Ennu Ninte Moideen. He has composed music for more than one hundred films.

== Discography ==
Year	Title	Lyricist	Director	Notes
1995	Chantha	Girish Puthenchery		
1996	Rajaputhran	Gireesh Puthenchery		
2001	Samana Thalam			
2001	Punyam			
2001	Naranathu Thamburan			
2001	Nagaravadhu			
2001	Sathyameva Jayathe	Girish Puthenchery, Kaithapram		
2001	Bharthavudyogam			
2002	Pakalppooram			Guest composer
2002	Valkannadi			
2002	Basket			
2002	Savithriyude Aranjanam			
2002	Kanmashi			
2003	Balettan	Gireesh Puthenchery		
2003	Gaurisankaram	Gireesh Puthenchery		Kerala State Film Award for Best Music Director, Asianet Film Award for Best Music Director
2004	Thalamelam			
2004	Kakkakarumban	Gireesh Puthenchery		
2004	Two Wheeler	Gireesh Puthenchery		
2004	Kusruthi			
2004	Vellinakshatram			
2004	Kanninum Kannadikkum	Gireesh Puthenchery		
2004	Akale	Gireesh Puthenchery		
2004	Mayilattam	Gireesh Puthenchery		
2004	Natturajavu	Gireesh Puthenchery		
2004	Sathyam	Gireesh Puthenchery		
2004	Youth Festival			
2004	Malsaram			
2004	Maampazhakkaalam	Gireesh Puthenchery		
2004	Kathavasheshan	Gireesh Puthenchery		Kerala State Film Award for Best Music Director
2004	Perumazhakkalam	Kaithapram		Kerala State Film Award for Best Music Director, Asianet Film Award for Best Music Director, Asianet Film Award for Best Male Playback Singer, Filmfare Award for Best Music Director – Malayalam
2004	Amrutham			
2005	The Campus	Gireesh Puthenchery		
2005	Sarkar Dada	Gireesh Puthenchery		
2005	Junior Senior			
2005	Immini Nalloraal	Gireesh Puthenchery		
2005	Athbhutha Dweepu			
2005	Krithyam			
2005	Paranju Theeratha Visheshangal			
2005	Gomathi Nayagam			Tamil film
2005	Lokanathan I.A.S			
2005	Boy Friend			
2006	Annorikkal			Guest composer
2006	Madhuchandralekha			
2006	Bada Dosth			
2006	Ravanan			
2006	Bus Conductor	Gireesh Puthenchery		
2006	Mahasamudram			
2006	Chakkara Muthu	Gireesh Puthenchery		
2006	Nottam			Kerala State Film Award For Best Male Playback Singer
2006	Kanaka Simhasanam			
2007	Nivedyam			Kerala State Film Award for Best Music Director, Asianet Film Award for Best Music Director
2007	Katha Parayumbol			
2008	Novel			Also guest appearance
2008	Anthiponvettam			
2008	Madampi	Gireesh Puthenchery		Kerala State Film Award for Best Music Director
2008	Parthan Kanda Paralokam			
2008	Sultan			
2008	De Ingottu Nokkiye			
2009	Vilapangalkappuram			
2009	I G Inspector General	Gireesh Puthenchery		
2009	Kaval Nilayam			Tamil
2009	Samastha Keralam PO			
2009	Nammal Thammil	Gireesh Puthenchery		
2009	Katha, Samvidhanam: Kunchacko			
2009	Vairam	Gireesh Puthenchery		
2009	Chemistry			
2009	Makante Achan			
2009	Orkkuka Vallappozhum			
2009	Banaras	Gireesh Puthenchery		
2009	Kancheepurathe Kalyanam			
2009	Utharaswayamvaram	Gireesh Puthenchery		
2009	Ivar Vivahitharayal	Gireesh Puthenchery		
2009	Bharya Onnu Makkal Moonnu			
2009	Robin Hood			
2010	Happy Husbands	Gireesh Puthenchery		
2010	Pramani	Gireesh Puthenchery		
2010	PSC Balan			
2010	April Fool	Gireesh Puthenchery		
2010	Kadaksham			
2010	Janakan	Gireesh Puthenchery		
2010	Oru Small Family			
2010	Arayan			
2010	Sadgamaya			
2010	Four Friends			
2010	Karayilekku Oru Kadal Dooram			Kerala State Film Award for Best Music Director
2010	Sahasram			
2010	Shikkar	Gireesh Puthenchery		
2011	Khaddama			Background music only
2011	Living Together			
2011	Bhakthajanangalude Sradhakku			
2011	Lucky Jokers			Composed along with Berny Ignatious and S.P Venkatesh
2011	Manikiakkallu			Also guest appearance
2011	Rathinirvedam			
2011	Pranayam			Filmfare Award for Best Music Director – Malayalam
2011	Swapna Sanchari			
2012	Ezham Suryan			
2012	Mallu Singh			
2012	Chattakaari			
2012	No. 66 Madhura Bus			
2012	916			
2012	Aan Piranna Veedu			
2012	Trivandrum Lodge			
2013	Romans			
2013	Kammath & Kammath			
2013	Celluloid			Kerala State Film Award for Best Music Director, Filmfare Award for Best Music Director – Malayalam
2013	72 Model			
2013	Up & Down - Mukalil Oralundu			
2013	Kalimannu			
2013	Pattam Pole			
2013	Radio Jockey			
2013	Kadhaveedu			
2014	Cousins			
2015	Nirnnayakam	Santhosh Varma	Boby Sanjay	
2015	Ennu Ninte Moideen	Rafeeq Ahamed	R.S Vimal	National Film Award for Best Music Direction, Filmfare Award for Best Music Director – Malayalam
2016	Kambhoji	ONV Kurup, Vinod Mankara, Gopalakrishna Bharathi	Vinod Mankara	Kerala State Film Award for Best Music Director
2016	Mohavalayam	Rafeeq Ahamed, Anchal Sreenath ...	T.V Chandran	
2017	Munthirivallikal Thalirkkumbol	Rafeeq Ahmed, Madhu Vasudevan, Dr B Ajithkumar	Jibu Jacob	
2017	Pullikaaran Staraa	Santhosh Varma, MR Jayageetha, Vinayak Sasikumar, BK Harinarayanan	Syamdhar	
2018	Kinar	B. K. Harinarayanan, Palani Bharathi	M. A. Nishad	
2018	Aami	Rafeeq Ahmed, Gulzar	Kamal	
2018	Ente Mezhuthiri Athazgangal	Rafeeq Ahmed	Sooraj Thomas	
2018	Koode	Rafeeq Ahmed	Anjali Menon	
2018	Odiyan	Rafeeq Ahamed, Prabha Varma, Lakshmi Sreekumar	V. A. Shrikumar	
2019	Pattabhiraman	Kaithapram	Kannan Thamarakkulam	
2019	Mamangam	Rafeeq Ahamed, Ajay Gopal	M. Padmakumar	
2020	Sufiyum Sujatayum		Naranipuzha Shanavas	
2022	Pathonpatham Noottandu	Rafeeq Ahamed	Vinayan	
2023	Otta	Rafeeq Ahamed, Vairamuthu	Resul Pookutty	
2023	Ayisha			4th 'Cinemana' International Film Festival, Oman, Award for background score
2024	Manorathangal			Series
2024	Oru Anweshanathinte Thudakkam	Palani Bharathi, Prabha Varma, Kunwar Juneja	M. A. Nishad	
2026	Chiram		Sindhu Paradayil; N. Sudheer	
