= Jaffar Idukki =

Indian actor

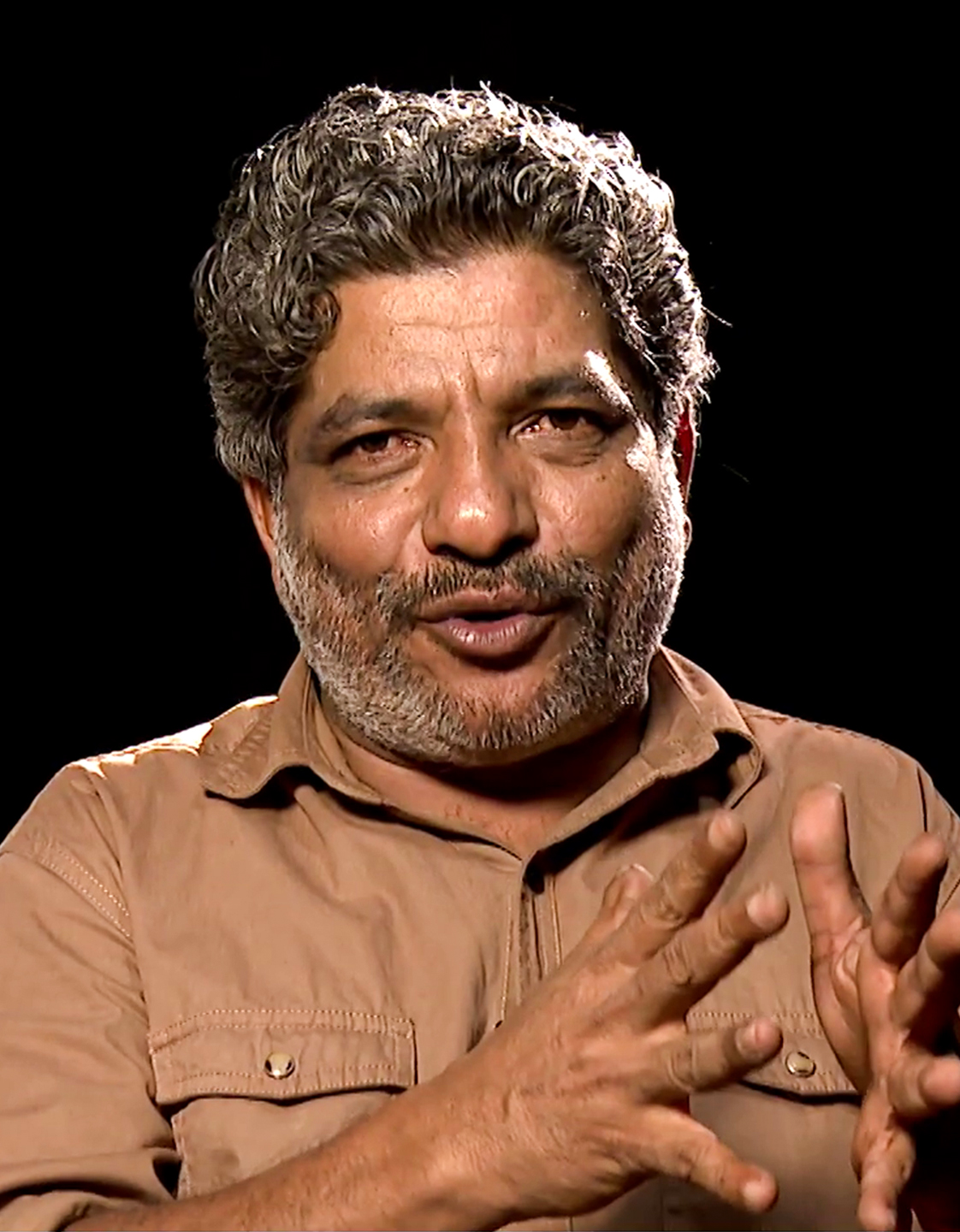
- Idukki in 2019
- Born: Jabbar A. M.
- Occupations: Actor; comedian; impressionist
- Years active: 2005–present
- Spouse: Arifa
- Children: 2

Jabbar A. M., professionally credited as Jaffer Idukki, is an Indian actor, impressionist, and comedian, who predominantly works in the Malayalam cinema. Started his career with the 2007 film Kaiyoppu, he has acted in about 100 films and has performed in a number of comedy stage shows.

== Filmography ==
Key
†	Denotes films that have not yet been released

- All films are in Malayalam language unless otherwise noted.

Year	Title	Role	Notes
2005	OK Chacko Cochin Mumbai	Hamsa	
2006	Chacko Randaaman		
2007	Kichamani MBA	Tharakan Pambadi	
2007	Nagaram	Barber	
2007	Big B	Dog Shamsu	
2007	Komban		
2007	Kaiyoppu	Firoz Babu (Jaffer)	
2007	Ayur Rekha		
2008	Bullet		
2008	Aayudham		
2008	Veruthe Oru Bharya	Kuttan	
2008	One Way Ticket	Chandran	
2008	Roudram	Police Constable	
2009	Vairam: Fight for Justice		
2009	Robin Hood	Sunny	
2009	Oru Black and White Kudumbam		
2009	Puthiya Mukham	Canteen Suni	
2009	Malayali	Jabbar	
2009	Moz & Cat	Fr. Rosario	
2010	Annarakkannanum Thannalayathu		
2010	Kadaksham		
2010	Oridathoru Postman	Leiju	
2010	Puthumukhangal	Kokkala Sulaiman	
2010	Swantham Bharya Zindabad	Balan	
2010	Thaskara Lahala	Maimunni	
2011	Pachuvum Kovalanum	Father Madikkel	
2011	Sarkar Colony	Jaffer	
2011	Adaminte Makan Abu	Photographer	
2011	Maharaja Talkies	Swaminathan	
2011	Mohabbath		
2011	Payyans		
2012	916		
2012	Hero Murugan	Decent Mukku	
2012	Doctor Innocentanu		
2012	Orange	Shivaji	
2013	Bicycle Thieves	Sajir aka Machan	
2013	Pigman	Davis	
2013	Romans	Durai Raj	
2014	Money Ratnam		
2014	Ulsaha Committee		
2015	Akkaldhamayile Pennu	Joseph	
2015	Swargathekkal Sundaram	Babu aka Tip	
2015	She Taxi	Kanjav Moideen	
2016	Kattappanayile Rithwik Roshan	Tea Shop Owner	
2016	Calling Bell		
2016	Darvinte Parinamam	Majeed	
2016	Maheshinte Prathikaaram	Kunjumon (Soumya's father)	
2017	Paippin Chuvattile Pranayam	Kunjachan	
2017	Parava	Khader	
2017	Karutha Joothan		
2017	Pakal Pole		
2017	Oru Cinemakkaran	Kumar	
2017	Pareeth Pandari	Dawood	
2017	Oru Mexican Aparatha	Jose	
2018	Nervarennu Immani Cherinjoo.. Taa..		
2018	Ippozhum Eppozhum Sthuthiyayirikatte		
2018	Joseph	Priest	
2018	Nithyaharitha Nayakan	Gangadharan	
2018	Drama	Mathukutty (Rosamma's housekeeper)	
2018	Aickarakkonathe Bhishaguaranmaar	Lalapan	
2018	Theevandi	Grocery Shop Man	
2018	Kenalum Kinarum		
2018	B. Tech	Lassarikka	
2019	Vikruthi	Varghese	
2019	Kettyolaanu Ente Malakha	Kuttiyachan	
2019	Jallikkettu	Kuriachan (Village guy)	
2019	Luca	Antony	
2019	Vakathirivu	CC Gundert	
2019	Happy Christmas		
2019	Ishq	Mukundan (Moral Police)	
2019	Oru Nakshathramulla Aakasham		
2019	An International Local Story	Srikandan	
2020	Anjaam Pathiraa	Lewis (Father of Benjamin)	
2020	Varky	Fr. Tom	
2021	Keshu Ee Veedinte Nadhan	Vijayanpillai (Keshu's brother-in-law)	
2021	Madhuram	Kunjikkaa	
2021	Mickey		
2021	Ajagajantharam	Committee President	
2021	Churuli	Kariya/Philipachayan (Toddy Shop Manager)	
2021	Chuzhal		
2021	Cabin		
2021	Changaayi		
2021	Vellakkarante Kamuki		
2021	Wolf	CPO	
2021	Star	Security Guard	
2021	Nayattu	Chief Minister Jayaraj	
2021	Anugraheethan Antony	Paulettan (Uncle of Anthony)	
2021	Yuvam	Transport Minister	
2021	Kanakam Kamini Kalaham	Drunkard - Sura (Surendran)	
2021	Saajan Bakery Since 1962	Benchamin Muthalali	
2022	Bro Daddy	Priest	
2022	Karnan Napoleon Bhagath Singh		
2022	Ini Utharam	Pastor Prakashan	
2022	Kooman	Maniyan	
2022	Malayankunju	Radhakrishnan	
2022	Priyan Ottathilanu	Sub Inspector	
2022	O2	Bus Passenger	Tamil film
2022	Upacharapoorvam Gunda Jayan	Trouble maker	
2022	Eesho	Ramcharan pillai	
2022	Pathonpatham Noottandu	Thandalkkaran Keshunni	
2022	Naaradan	Fr. Clement Purambokkil	
2022	Gold	Marriage Broker	
2022	Bharatha Circus	J.P	
2023	Djinn	Aniyan Nair	
2023	Aalankam		
2023	Kadina Kadoramee Andakadaham	Ismail	
2023	Jackson Bazaar Youth	Jackson Velayyan	
2023	Mindiyum Paranjum		
2023	Ramachandra Boss & Co	Siddique	
2023	Pulimada	Appachan	
2023	Maharani		
2023	Cheena Trophy		
2024	Palayam PC		
2024	Prathibha Tutorials		
2024	Mango Mury		
2024	Qalb		
2024	Iyer In Arabia		
2024	Anweshippin Kandethum		
2024	Oru Sarkar Ulpannam		
2024	Thalavan	Allappan	
2024	Mandakini	Sukeshan	
2024	Once Upon a Time in Kochi	Chandrappan	
2024	Kudumbasthreeyum Kunjadum		
2024	Little Hearts	Paappan	
2024	Big Ben		
2024	Kuttante Shinigami		
2024	Oru Kattil Oru Muri		
2024	Oru Anweshanathinte Thudakkam		
2024	Poyyamozhi	Chachan	
2025	Besty	Kolappuli Appan	
2025	Am Ah		
2025	Chattuli		
2025	Mindiyum Paranjum	Varghese	
2026	Magic Mushrooms	Ayon's father	
2026	Thudakkam	Varghese	
2026	Bouma		
