= Lishoy =

Indian actor

- Born: 26 April 1961 (age 65); Mathilakam, Kerala
- Occupation: Actor
- Years active: 2003–present
- Relatives: Leona Lishoy (daughter)

Lishoy is an Indian actor known for his work in Malayalam films and television.

== Filmography ==
| Year | Title | Role | Notes |
|---|---|---|---|
| 1986 | Prayanam | | |
| 1992 | Yoddha | | |
| 1993 | Bhoomigeetham | Police officer | |
| 1995 | Mazhavilkoodaram | Police officer | |
| 1997 | Hitler Brothers | DGP | |
| 2003 | Kasthooriman | Joseph Alukka | |
| 2004 | Vajram | | |
| 2004 | Symphony | | |
| 2005 | Rappakal | | |
| 2005 | Thanmathra | | |
| 2006 | Karutha Pakshikal | Manichan | |
| 2006 | Pakal | | |
| 2007 | Soorya Kireedam | Anandan | |
| 2007 | November Rain | | |
| 2007 | Veeraliapttu | | |
| 2007 | Panthaya Kozhi | | |
| 2008 | Kerala Police | | |
| 2009 | Passenger | D.G.P | |
| 2010 | Malarvaadi Arts Club | Damodaran | |
| 2010 | College Days | Joseph | |
| 2010 | Black Stallion | | |
| 2011 | Three Kings | | |
| 2011 | Melvilasom | | |
| 2011 | Beautiful | Stephen's father | |
| 2011 | Note Out | Pavithran's father | |
| 2012 | No. 66 Madhura Bus | | |
| 2012 | Ayalum Njanum Thammil | | |
| 2012 | Padmasree Bharat Dr. Saroj Kumar | Income Tax Department officer | |
| 2013 | Radio | | |
| 2013 | Red Rain | | |
| 2013 | Signal | | |
| 2013 | Sringaravelan | | |
| 2013 | Romans | Akash's father | |
| 2013 | Punyalan Agarbattis | Joy's Ilayachan | |
| 2014 | How Old Are You? | | |
| 2014 | Pranayakadha | | |
| 2014 | Koothara | Antony | |
| 2014 | Sapthamashree Thaskaraha | Superintendent Alexander | |
| 2014 | Apothecary | Dr. Peethambaran | |
| 2014 | Avatharam | Valsala's father | |
| 2014 | Actually | Deepak's father | |
| 2015 | Onnam Loka Mahayudham | | |
| 2015 | Kumbasaram | Dr. Prabhakaran | |
| 2015 | Chirakodinja Kinavukal | Apothecary | |
| 2015 | Appavum Veenjum | Bride's father | |
| 2016 | Shajahanum Pareekuttiyum | Devanarayanan I.P.S. | |
| 2016 | Thoppil Joppan | Varkey | |
| 2017 | Munthirivallikal Thalirkkumbol | Dasan | |
| 2017 | Alamara | Marriage counselor | |
| 2017 | The Great Father | William's father | |
| 2017 | Lakshyam | Police officer | |
| 2017 | Punyalan Private Limited | Joy's uncle | |
| 2019 | Kuttymama | Anjali's father | |
| 2019 | Pranaya Meenukalude Kadal | Khalid Rahman | |
| 2021 | The Priest | Alex Alatt | |
| 2022 | Son of Alibaba Nalapathonaman | Subair | |
| 2022 | Ullasam | Nima's father | |
| 2022 | Oru Jaathi Manushyan | | |
| 2023 | Mukalpparappu | | |
| 2024 | Marco | Adattu Varghese | |
| 2026 | Iniyum | | |
| 2026 | Drishyam 3 | Chacko | |

== Telvision ==
| Year | Show | Role | Channel |
|---|---|---|---|
| 2005 | Thulabharam | Ganga's father | Surya TV |
| 2007 | Mizhiyoram | | Kerala Vision |
| 2007 | Priyam | Ramachandran | Kairali TV |
| 2010 | Indraneelam | Balachandran | Surya TV |
| 2011–2014 | Kumkumapoovu | Prabhakaran | Asianet |
| 2013-2014 | Snehakoodu | | Surya TV |
| 2014 | Vadhu | | Surya TV |
| 2014 | Balamani | | Mazhavil Manorama |
| 2014–2015 | Karuthamuthu | Dr. Fernandez | Asianet |
| 2015 | Snehajalakam | | Surya TV |
| 2016 | Ennu Swantham Jani | | Surya TV |
| 2017 | Seetha | Meera's father | Flowers TV |
| 2017–2020 | Sthreepadham | Jayachandran | Mazhavil Manorama |
| 2019–2020 | Chocolate | Sethumadhavan | Surya TV |
| 2020 | Koodathayi | Joseph | Flowers TV |
| 2020–2021 | Pournami Thinkal | Prathap Shankar | Asianet |
| 2021 | Nandanam | Yamuna's father | Flowers TV |
| 2021 | Manasinakkare | Anjali's father | Surya TV |
| 2021–2022 | Pranayavarnangal | Sethupathi | Zee Keralam |
| 2023 | Sudhamani Superaa | Principal | Zee Keralam |
| 2023 | Muttathe Mulla | Jagannathan | Asianet |
| 2024–present | Mangalyam | Sethumadhavan | Zee Keralam |
