= Olavum Theeravum =

1970 Indian film

- Theatrical release poster
- Directed by: P. N. Menon
- Written by: M. T. Vasudevan Nair
- Based on: Olavum Theeravum by M. T. Vasudevan Nair
- Produced by: P. A. Backer
- Starring: Madhu; Usha Nandini
- Cinematography: Mankada Ravi Varma
- Edited by: Ravi
- Music by: M. S. Baburaj
- Production company: Charuchithra
- Distributed by: Asha Films
- Release date: 27 February 1970
- Country: India
- Language: Malayalam

Olavum Theeravum (transl. Ripples and the shore) is a 1970 Indian Malayalam-language drama film directed by P. N. Menon, written by M. T. Vasudevan Nair, and produced by P. A. Backer. It stars Madhu and Usha Nandini, with Jose Prakash, Philomina, and Nilambur Balan in supporting roles. The film has a musical score by M. S. Baburaj. Cinematography was done by Mankada Ravi Varma.

The film is based on a Vasudevan Nair short story of the same name, published in an anthology of short stories in 1957. The story is about a Muslim trader who falls in love with his dead friend's sister who is the daughter of a prostitute. But the girl's mother forces her to marry a wealthy man who has an eye on her.

Olavum Theeravum was released on 27 February 1970 to critical acclaim. The film was also a commercial success and went on to become one of the highest grossing Malayalam films of the year. The film won four Kerala State Film Awards that year for Best Film, Best Screenplay (Nair), Best Cinematography (Varma), and Second Best Actress (Philomina).

The film is now regarded as a landmark film in Malayalam film history as this film is credited to be the catalyst for the making of art house films that flourished in the Malayalam film Industry during the seventies. Films like Swayamvaram and Peruvazhiyambalam is said to have taken inspiration from this film. The film was remade as a featurette, Olavum Theeravum, as part of the web series Manorathangal (2024) on ZEE5.

== Plot ==
Timber traders Bapputty and Abdu are friends. Ashamed of his mother Beevathu's immoral life after his father's death, Abdu runs away from his native village Vazhakkadavu and is engaged in timber trading. Abdu never returns to his home after that. On the way to the trading centre after loading timber from the forest Abdu falls ill and dies on the way. Bapputty reaches Beevathu's hut with Abdu's dead body. Bapputty takes pity on the family and decides to support them.

Here, Bapputty falls in love with Abdu's only sister Nabeesa who also hates her mother's way of life but is helpless. Bapputty takes a decision to make enough money, marry Nabeesa and live happily. He leaves the village to distant timber depots to realize this dream.

Meanwhile, a rich trader Kunjali who was away from his native village for a long time now returns. He sees Nabeesa and makes advances. Beevathu, who only thinks of making money, encourages Nabeesa to befriend Kunjali, but she avoids going anywhere near him. She keeps waiting for Bapputty to return and take her away.

One day, with Beevathu's support Kunjali molests Nabeesa. On that fateful day Bapputty reaches the village and is heartbroken at the happenings. But the kind-hearted Bapputty who loved Nabeesa sincerely, affirms his decision to marry her. Nabeesa refuses and pleads with him to leave her. The film ends with Nabeesa's suicide and Bapputty staring at her swollen corpse washed ashore as he leaves the village.

== Cast ==
- Madhu as Baputty
- Ushanandini as Nabeesa
- Jose Prakash as Kunjali
- Nilambur Balan as Mooppan
- Abbas as Butcher Moosa
- Alummoodan as Narayanan
- Kunjava
- Mala Aravindan
- Nellikode Bhaskaran as Abdukka
- Nilambur Ayisha as Ayisha
- Paravoor Bharathan as Suleiman
- Pariyanampatta Kunjunni Namboodirippad as Kadathukaaran Mammathu
- Philomina as Beevaathu
- Sujatha
- T. Damodaran

== Soundtrack ==
The music was composed by M. S. Baburaj with lyrics by P. Bhaskaran and Moinkutty Vaidyar.

No.	Song	Singers	Lyrics	Length (m:ss)
1	"Chaampakkam Cholayil"	S. Janaki	P. Bhaskaran	
2	"Idakkonnu Chirichu"	S. Janaki	P. Bhaskaran	
3	"Kandaarakkattummel"	M. S. Baburaj	Moinkutty Vaidyar	
4	"Kavililulla Maarivillinu"	P. Leela, Chorus	P. Bhaskaran	
5	"Manimaaran Thannathu"	K. J. Yesudas, Machad Vasanthi	P. Bhaskaran	
6	"Oyye Enikkondu"	M. S. Baburaj, C. A. Aboobacker	Moinkutty Vaidyar	
7	"Thadaki Manathe"	M. S. Baburaj	Moinkutty Vaidyar	

== Reception ==
=== Critical response ===
In a retrospect review, B. Vijaykumar of The Hindu states that, " Madhu and Philomena excelled in their roles. In fact, Beevathu is considered as one of the best performances of Philomina, which fetched her a State award for the second best actress of the year. The songs written by P. Bhaskaran and set to tune by Baburaj were haunting. The films traditional Mappila songs were also very well done. The film will be remembered as a film that won State awards for best feature film, best cinematography (Mankada Ravi Varma), script (M.T. Vasudevan Nair) and second best actress (Philomina). And also for its haunting music."

=== Box office ===
The film was a commercial success.

=== Awards ===
Kerala State Film Awards

- Best Film
- Best Screenplay (Nair)
- Best Cinematography (Varma)
- Second Best Actress (Philomina)

== Legacy ==
Olavum Theeravum has been credited with helping to bring about a "flowering of art-house films that have today become the defining quality of Malayalam cinema", with being Malayalam cinema's "breakthrough into realism", and as "a watershed in the history of Malayalam cinema". The tragic realism in this art-house movie, which was also a commercial hit, later became a definitive formula for a whole generation of Malayalam directors, including P. A. Backer. MT's flawless script centering on the love affair of a trader with the daughter of a sex worker was the base on which P.N. Menon made this classic, which became a trendsetter for the realistic way of making movies in Malayalam. It is rightly regarded as one of the milestones in Malayalam cinema.

== Remake ==
The film was remade as a featurette under the same name as part of the Malayalam-language anthology series titled Manorathangal (2024) on ZEE5, with Mohanlal and Durga Krishna playing the lead roles. The episode was directed by Priyadarshan.
