= Confessions of a Cuckoo =

2021 Indian film

- Directed by: Jay Jithin Prakash
- Written by: Dinesh Neelakandan; Jay Jithin Prakash
- Produced by: Arjun Raveendran
- Starring: Nehrin Navas; Prarthana Sandeep; Durga Krishna
- Cinematography: Antony Jo; Raj Kumar
- Edited by: Tinu Thomas
- Music by: Aloshya Peter
- Release date: 8 January 2021
- Running time: 97 minutes
- Country: India
- Language: Malayalam

Confessions of a Cuckoo is 2021 Indian Malayalam-language drama film co-written and directed by Jay Jithin Prakash. It stars Nehrin Navas, Prarthana Sandeep, and Durga Krishna. The film narrates a social topic inspired by a real event.

== Plot ==
Sherin is pursuing a journey through the lives of many children who went through brutal abuses in past. She meets with many people, learning their stories for her documentary including the stories of Naseema and Anna which makes a change turn to Sherin's past.

== Cast ==
- Durga Krishna as Sherin
- Nehrin Navas
- Prarthana Sandeep as Anna
- Arjun Nandakumar as Vinay

== Reception ==
The movie received a mixed reviews. According to a review by Malayala Manorama, the film manages to capture the least reality of life within the headlines that are read over and over again every day in newspapers.
