= Vimaanam =

- Theatrical release poster
- Directed by: Pradeep M. Nair
- Written by: Pradeep M. Nair
- Produced by: Listin Stephen
- Starring: Prithviraj Sukumaran; Durga Krishna
- Cinematography: Shehnad Jalal
- Edited by: Baiju Kurup
- Music by: Gopi Sundar
- Production company: Magic Frames
- Distributed by: Adam's World of Imagination
- Release date: 22 December 2017
- Running time: 147 minutes
- Country: India
- Language: Malayalam

Vimaanam (transl. Airplane) is a 2017 Indian Malayalam-language comedy drama film written and directed by Pradeep M. Nair (in his directorial debut). The film stars Prithviraj Sukumaran and Durga Krishna. The film was released on 22 December 2017.

This film is said to be loosely based on the life of Saji Thomas, who can neither hear nor speak, but designed and built a lightweight aircraft.

== Plot ==
Professor J. Venkiteshwaran receives a Padma Bhushan for the designs of planes he built for the Indian Air Force. Venkiteshwaran receives a phone call from his old love interest Janaki's daughter, Gouri, who requests him to meet her terminally ill mother, as it is her final wish. Whilst on the train back to his hometown, the film goes into a flashback. A young Venkiteshwaran, known as Venkidi, has often dropped-out of school despite his intelligence due to bullying for his use of a hearing aid. He has a love of aircraft and has been attempting to fly an aircraft that he built himself, which he fails at. He falls in love with Janaki, who supports his dreams. Venkidi decides to build a new aircraft with the help of Janaki and steals her father's car for the aircraft parts. Venkidi is successful in building the aircraft and flies it over his village, however he crashes the aircraft, injuring his arm. Janaki's father learns of her love for Venkidi and forbids her from seeing him. Venkidi fixes the aircraft and flies it for the second time safely. Janaki's father learns that Venkidi stole his car and gets him arrested. In his jail cell, Venkidi learns that Janaki is being sent to Singapore to her relatives for higher studies and will be getting married. Venkidi who has been imprisoned for many days is allowed to visit Janaki. He then proceeds to take his aircraft and flies past Janaki before she boards her flight. He crash lands the aircraft at the airport and as he is escorted by police officers, he sees Janaki for one last time. In the present, he arrives at his hometown and is visited by Janaki and her daughter. Venkidi fulfills his dream of flying his old aircraft with Janaki.

== Cast ==
- Prithviraj Sukumaran as Venkiteshwaran (Venkidi)
  - Eric Anil as Young Venkidi
- Durga Krishna as Janaki
- Anarkali Marikar as Gouri, Janaki's daughter
- Alencier Ley Lopez as Roger
- Saiju Kurup as Ananthan
- Sudheer Karamana as Murugan
- Major Ravi as Elias
- Lena as Daisy
- P. Balachandran as Priest
- Liya Anu as Radha
- Baby Durga Premjith
- Dheepa Ramanujam as Venkidi's mother
- Vijilesh Karayad as Venkidi's friend
- Vishnu Govindan as Noufal

== Production ==
Vimaanam is a film involving high VFX works for the flying scenes. The film will have two time periods with Prithviraj appearing in two different looks. Reportedly, he will be reducing weight for the role and will also be taking flying courses.

Principal photography commenced on 9 February 2017 in Kochi, Kerala. The main filming locations was Bhatkal and Mangalore, and was also shot in Delhi, Mysore, and Thiruvananthapuram. Vimaanam is loosely based on the life of Saji Thomas, who could neither hear nor speak but who designed and built his own ultralight aircraft. Two films were released about the life of Saji Mathew, the other film being titled Aby.

== Music ==
The music was composed by Gopi Sunder. The lyrics were written by Rafeeq Ahamed.

Track	Song	Singer(s)
1	"Anthike Varikente"	Divya S. Menon, Kavya Ajit
2	"Vaanamakalunnuvo"	Sithara Krishnakumar
3	"Vaaniluyare"	Najim Arshad, Shreya Ghoshal, Gopi Sunder
4	"Meghakanavinu"	Divya S. Menon, Kavya Ajit
5	"Anthimaanam"	Nandini Srikar
