= Bharatha Circus =

2022 Indian Malayalam-language film

- Directed by: Sohan Seenulal
- Written by: Muhad Vembayam
- Produced by: Anooj Shaji
- Starring: Binu Pappu; Shine Tom Chacko; M. A. Nishad; Aradhya Ann
- Cinematography: Binu Kurian
- Edited by: V. Sajan
- Music by: Bijibal
- Release date: 26 May 2023
- Country: India
- Language: Malayalam

Bharatha Circus is a 2023 Indian Malayalam-language drama film written and directed by Sohan Seenulal, and starring Binu Pappu, Shine Tom Chacko and M. A. Nishad in the lead role. This film was produced by Anooj Shaji under the banner of Best Way Entertainment.

== Cast ==
- Binu Pappu as Lakshmanan
- Shine Tom Chacko as Anoop
- M. A. Nishad as C.I. Jayachandran
- Sunil Sukhada as Ashokan
- Jaffar Idukki as J.P
- Aradhya Ann as Tansi
- Megha Thomas as Kaveri
- Prajod Kalabhavan as Binish
- Saritha Kukku as Roslin
- Abhija Sivakala as S.P. Sara Simon
- Jayakrishnan as Hari
- Sudheer Karamana as Menon
- Lali P.M. as Ummoomma
- Jolly Chirayath as Anoop's Mother
- Divya M. Nair as Seena
- Riah Sarah as Sanjana
- Saju Navodaya as Aliyaar
