= Olavum Theeravum (2024 film) =

2024 Indian featurette

- Digital release poster
- Directed by: Priyadarshan
- Written by: M. T. Vasudevan Nair
- Based on: Olavum Theeravum by M. T. Vasudevan Nair
- Produced by: Vikram Mehra; Siddharth Anand Kumar; Rohandeep Singh; Rajesh Kejriwal; Jay Pandya
- Starring: Mohanlal; Surabhi Lakshmi
- Narrated by: Kamal Haasan
- Cinematography: Santosh Sivan
- Edited by: M. S. Aiyappan Nair
- Music by: Bijibal
- Production companies: Yoodlee Films; Jumping Tomato Studios; Blankslate Films
- Distributed by: ZEE5
- Release date: 15 August 2024
- Running time: 58 minutes
- Country: India
- Language: Malayalam

Olavum Theeravum (transl. Ripples and the bank) is a 2024 Indian Malayalam-language period drama featurette written by M. T. Vasudevan Nair and directed by Priyadarshan. It is based on Nair's 1957 short story of the same name and serves as a remake of the 1970 film adaptation. The featurette is part of the anthology web series Manorathangal (transl. Mindscapes), which consists of nine featurettes adapted from Nair's short stories. Mohanlal appears as the main lead as Bapputty. It also features Mamukkoya, Hareesh Peradi, Surabhi Lakshmi and Durga Krishna .

Principal photography for the featurette began in July 2022 in and around Thodupuzha and was completed in five and a half days. In keeping with the style of the 1970 film, the featurette was made in black-and-white format. The release was delayed for two years due to the anthology series, originally commissioned for Netflix, being turned down by the platform reportedly due to cost overrun. Olavum Theeravum was released on ZEE5 for digital streaming on 15 August 2024.

== Premise ==
Set in a riverside hamlet in 1950s Malabar, A boatman named Bapputty falls in love with Nebeesu while delivering the belongings of a deceased passenger to her family. A wealthy outsider, Kunjali, also desires Nebeesu and becomes a rival to Bapputty. Despite facing numerous challenges and misunderstandings, Bapputty's love for Nebeesu remains steadfast. The story culminates in a dramatic confrontation between the two men, with Bapputty asserting his love for Nebeesu.

== Cast ==
- Mohanlal as Bappootty
- Surabhi Lakshmi as Beevathu
- Durga Krishna as Nabeesu
- Mamukkoya as Mammadikka
- Hareesh Peradi as Kunjali
- Vijilesh Karayad as Narayanan
- Vinod Kovoor as Fisherman
- Appunni Sasi as Bangle Seller
- Jayaprakash Kuloor as Mollakka
- Jayaraj Kozhikode as Mooppan
- Vijayan Karanthoor as Sulaiman
- Babu Annoor as Abdu
- Muhammed Eravattur as Kuttan Nair
- Saiffudin as Veluthedathu Nair
- George Idukki as Cheruman
- Priya Kozhikode as Neeli
- Jayachandran A V as Butcher Moosa

== Production ==
=== Development ===
Olavum Theeravum is part of an anthology series, Manorathangal (transl. Mindscapes), consisting of nine featurettes, based on nine short stories of M. T. Vasudevan Nair, which was originally produced for Netflix. The anthology draws inspiration from Stories by Rabindranath Tagore (2015), a television series based on the works of poet Rabindranath Tagore. Written by Nair himself, Olavum Theeravum is based on his 1957 short story of the same name and serves as a remake of the 1970 film directed by P. N. Menon. This new segment in the anthology was initially reported by the media in September 2021, to be directed by Priyadarshan. It would make Olavum Theeravum Priyadarshan's second featurette in the anthology after Shilalikhithangal, making him the only director who has directed two featurettes in Manorathangal.

Priyadarshan was invited to join the project by Aswathy V. Nair, Nair's daughter and the creative producer of the anthology. After discussing the offer with Nair, Priyadarshan agreed to take on the role of showrunner and direct a featurette based on a short story of his choice. He initially chose a different story, but it did not pan out as expected. Subsequently, Nair suggested Shilalikhithangal, which Priyadarshan adapted. Upon completing Shilalikhithangal, the producers expressed a desire to cast Mohanlal in an additional featurette and suggested that Priyadarshan direct it. Priyadarshan proposed remaking Olavum Theeravum as his desire to become a director was sparked in high school when he read the published screenplay of the original film. However, both Nair and Mohanlal were skeptical about the story's relevance in contemporary times. Despite this, Mohanlal agreed to act in the remake as a gesture of support for Priyadarshan's dream. To address their concerns, Priyadarshan assured them that he would set the film in a period setting. Nair edited the original 1970 screenplay to 50 minutes, making it the longest featurette in the anthology.

Srikant Murali served as the associate director. The anthology was produced by Saregama India through their production house Yoodlee Films, with line production handled by Newsvalue Productions. Aswathi contributed as the creative producer, with Sudheesh Ambalappadu acting as the line producer.

=== Casting ===
Mohanlal plays timber trader Baputty, the role played by Madhu in the original film. In June 2022, a month before filming began, Priyadarshan said that he is yet to finalize the remaining cast barring Mohanlal. Durga Krishna was cast in the role of Nabeesa, played by Usha Nandini in the original. Hareesh Peradi was cast as the villain Kunjali (played by Jose Prakash in the original). Olavum Theeravum marked Mamukkoya's final film appearance, where he took on the role of Mammadikka, originally portrayed by Pariyanampatta Kunjunni Namboodirippad. Priyadarshan recalled that Mamukkoya had expressed a profound sense of fulfillment, stating that his "life was complete" as he remembered watching the original film's shooting as a spectator, never dreaming he would one day have the chance to perform in it himself.

The cast also includes Surabhi Lakshmi, Vinod Kovoor, Appunni Sasi, and Jayaprakash Kuloor.

=== Filming ===
The anthology began filming with its first featurette, Abhayam Thedi Veendum, in 2021. Principal photography for Olavum Theeravum began in early July 2022 in Thodupuzha. According to Priyadarshan, although the original screenplay mentioned the river as a character, the film itself did not prominently feature it, which left him disappointed. This prompted Priyadarshan to prioritize portraying the river as an integral character in the featurette. The featurette was shot in and around various locations including Thommankuthu, Chappathu, Kudayathoor, Kanjar, and the Malankara Dam reservoir. A set was constructed in Kudayathoor.

Mohanlal performed his own stunts in the rafting scenes in the flooded river. Filming wrapped up on 17 July 2022 in Thodupuzha. In the same month, it was revealed that the film would be released in black-and-white format, same as the 1970 film. Since the 1984 film Ente Gramam, only two films have been released entirely in black-and-white format—1956, Central Travancore (2019) and Bramayugam (2024). Despite Olavum Theeravum completing production ahead of Bramayugam, the two-year delay caused the latter to release first. In a 2022 interview with Mathrubhumi, actor Madhu, who portrayed Bappootty in the 1970 film adaptation, expressed his indifference towards filming in black-and-white. He noted that in 1970, Malayalam cinema was limited to black-and-white, despite the world being in colour. He felt the remake should have been in colour to offer a distinct experience for audiences viewing it 50 years later.

The entire filming process lasted five-and-a-half days. Although Nair edited the screenplay to 50 minutes, the final footage amounted to 55 minutes. Santosh Sivan was the cinematographer, while Sabu Cyril handled the art direction. Dhanya Balakrishnan was the costume designer, while Libin Mohanan handled the makeup. M. R. Rajakrishnan was the sound designer. The featurette's dubbing began in August.

== Release ==
Olavum Theeravum, along with the eight other featurettes, was originally commissioned for Netflix. However, the anthology series faced rejection by the streaming platform, purportedly due to cost overruns resulting from the inclusion of new featurettes, including Olavum Theeravum. The featurette was released on ZEE5 for digital streaming on 15 August 2024.

== Reception ==
Sajesh Mohan of Onmanorama wrote: "Priyadarshan-Mohanlal team's 'Olavum Theeravum': A monochrome echo of a classic"
