= Sudheer Karamana =

Indian film actor and politician

- Born: 24 May 1971 (age 55); Karamana, Thiruvananthapuram, Kerala, India
- Occupations: Film actor and politician
- Years active: 2006–present
- Political party: Communisat Party of India (Marxist)
- Spouse: Anjana
- Children: 2
- Parents: Karamana Janardanan Nair; Jaya J. Nair

Sudheer Karamana (born 24 May 1971) is an Indian actor and politician who appears mainly in Malayalam cinema. He is the son of actor Karamana Janardanan Nair.

== Personal life ==
Sudheer is the eldest son of actor Karamana Janardanan Nair and Jaya, at Karamana, Thiruvananthapuram. He has two brothers Sunil and Sujay. He attended the Kendriya Vidyalaya Pattom school, then later went on to finish a Geography degree from the University College Thiruvananthapuram and also received a Bachelor of Education from the Government College of Teacher Education, Thiruvananthapuram. After his graduation he worked at the Centre for Earth Science Studies, in Thiruvananthapuram. Then he worked as a teacher at Christ Nagar School, Thiruvananthapuram, and M.E.S Indian school, Qatar in 1993. Later in 1998 he returned from Qatar to join at Govt Girl's Higher Secondary School, Venganoor as a teacher. In 2003 he became the principal there. He has been the Principal of Girl's Higher Secondary School, Venganoor, Thiruvananthapuram for 13 years.

Sudheer is married to a school teacher at Sasthamangalam Higher Secondary School. He and his wife have a son and a daughter. He is settled in Thiruvananthapuram with his family.

== Politics ==
Sudheer Karamana has been fielded as an independent candidate supported by Left Democratic Front for the Thiruvananthapuram Assembly constituency in the 2026 Kerala Legislative Assembly election. He came as last-minute replacement after the sitting MLA Antony Raju faced legal troubles. UDF candidate CP John defeated Sudheer Karamana by 9,863 votes. Sudheer got 35,723 votes.

== Filmography ==
=== Films ===
Key
†	Denotes films that have not yet been released

- All films are in Malayalam language unless otherwise noted.

Year	Title	Role	Notes
2005	Maraviyude Manam		Tele Film
2006	Vaasthavam		
2006	Lion		
2007	Kichamani MBA		
2008	Ayudham		
2008	Mulla		
2008	Thalappavu		
2009	Calendar		
2009	Vairam: Fight for Justice		
2010	Anwar	Pork Shaji	
2011	City of God		
2011	Bombay March 12		
2012	The King & the Commissioner		
2012	Hero		
2012	Friday		
2012	Debt		Short Film
2012	Namukku Parkkan		
2012	No. 66 Madhura Bus		
2012	Ozhimuri		
2012	Karmayodha		
2012	Bavuttiyude Namathil		
2013	Red Wine		
2013	Amen	Shoshanna's brother	
2013	Left Right Left	Comrade Aliyar	
2013	Thank You		
2013	Nadan		
2013	Kanyaka Talkies		
2013	Kaanchi		
2013	Punyalan Agarbattis	Kollur Jayaprakash	
2013	Philips and the Monkey Pen	Decimal's Father	
2013	Lisammayude Veedu		
2013	Silence		
2014	Vellivelichathil		
2014	God's Own Country		
2014	Manglish		
2014	How Old Are You		
2014	Sapthamashree Thaskaraha	'Leaf' Vasu	
2014	Homely Meals		
2014	karnavar		
2014	Naku Penta Naku Taka		
2014	Varsham	School Principal	
2015	Sir CP		
2015	Picket 43		
2015	Rudrasimhasanam	Kunatthur Bhairavan	
2015	Acha Dhin		
2015	St Mary'sile Kolapathakam		
2015	Njan Samvidhanam Cheyyum		
2015	The Reporter		
2015	Nirnayakam	Judge	
2015	Jamna Pyari	SI Purushothaman	
2015	Kunjiramayanam	SI Sugunan	
2015	Urumbukal Urangarilla	Kelu Aasan	
2015	Utopiayile Rajavu		
2015	Jo and the Boy		
2015	Akkaldhamayile Pennu		
2015	Veyilum Mazhayum	Ram	
2015	Kohinoor	Maman	
2015	Salt Mango Tree	Mohan Kumar	
2015	Chirakodinja Kinavukal		
2015	Ennu Ninte Moideen	Bhasi	
2015	Lord Livingstone 7000 Kandi		
2016	Aalroopangal		
2016	Pavada		
2016	Ithu Thanda Police		
2016	Hallelooya		
2016	School Bus		
2016	Karinkunnam 6'S		
2016	Daffadar		
2016	Pulimurugan	Kaayikka	
2017	Dance Dance		
2017	Aby	Babychan	
2017	Sakhavinte Priyasakhi		
2017	Munthirivallikal Thalirkkumbol	Chalakan	
2017	1971: Beyond Borders	Captain Aadiselvan	
2017	Sunday Holiday	Benny	
2017	Utharam Parayaathe		
2017	Vimaanam	Murugan	
2018	Kammara Sambhavam		
2019	Oronnonnara Pranayakadha	Assanaar Haji	
2019	Marconi Mathai	Vijayan	
2019	Ormayil Oru Shishiram	Principal	
2019	Thelivu	Muhammed Iqbal	
2019	Pattabhiraman	Chandran	
2019	Ganagandharvan	Prabhakaran	
2019	Vikruthi	Pradalan	
2019	Thakkol		
2019	Thrissur Pooram	Syed	
2020	Avarodoppam Aliyum Achayanum	George Achayan	TV series on Asianet
2021	18 Hours		
2022	Karnan Napoleon Bhagath Singh		
2022	Pathaam Valavu	Priest	
2022	Cobra		Tamil film
2022	Pathonpatham Noottandu	Pachupanicker	
2022	Bharatha Circus	Menon	
2023	Within Seconds	LTT.Ganeshan	
2023	Kurukkan	Advocate	
2023	Bullet Diaries		
2024	Iyer In Arabia		
2024	Aaro		
2024	CID Ramachandran Retd. SI	Jayarajan	
2024	Once Upon a Time in Kochi	Nicholas	
2024	Oru Anweshanathinte Thudakkam	Adv. Vinayachandran	
2024	Njan Kandatha Sare		
2024	Extra Decent	Das	
2025	Besty	Siddikoya	
2025	The Protector		
2025	Ambalamukkile Visheshangal		
2025	Pongala		
2026	Christina		
2026	Juniors Journey		
2026	Aadu 3: One Last Ride - Part 1	Chudala	
2026	Lurk †	TBA	

=== Radio drama ===
Year	Title	Role	Broadcaster	Notes	Ref.
2024	AiDEN - The Ai Spirit		Club FM		
