= Sankeerthanam Pole =

- Directed by: Jeassy
- Written by: Pappachan
- Screenplay by: Pappachan
- Starring: Murali; Geetha; Rekha; Captain Raju; K. B. Ganesh Kumar
- Cinematography: Anandakuttan
- Edited by: K. Sankunni
- Music by: Johnson
- Production company: Chakravarthy Film Corporation
- Distributed by: Chakravarthy Film Corporation
- Release date: 1997
- Country: India
- Language: Malayalam

Sankeerthanam Pole is a 1997 Indian Malayalam-language film, directed by Jeassy. The film stars Murali, Geetha, Rekha, Captain Raju and K. B. Ganesh Kumar. The film has musical score by Johnson. This was Jeassy's last film as director.

== Cast ==
- Murali as Kunjachan
- Geetha as Achamma
- Rajan P. Dev as Mathayi/Mathachan
- Rekha as Joyamma George
- Baiju as Georgekutty Mathew
- Sadiq as Ravi
- Captain Raju as Father Zakariya
- K. B. Ganesh Kumar as Vijayan
- Mala Aravindan as Varkky
- Maathu as Thulasi Ayyappan
- Bindu Panicker as Suzy Mathew
- Thrissur Elsy as Salamma George
- Prof. Aliyar as N.K. / Narayanan Kutty
- Lishoy in Cameo Appearance
- K.P.A.C. Sunny in Cameo Appearance
- Kanakalatha in Cameo Appearance
- Sankaradi in Cameo Appearance
- Pradeep Varapuzha in Cameo Appearance

== Soundtrack ==
The music was composed by Johnson.

No.	Song	Singers	Lyrics	Length (m:ss)
1	"Nammal Varavaayi"	K. J. Yesudas, K. S. Chithra, Chorus	O. N. V. Kurup	
2	"Neela Meghame"	K. J. Yesudas, K. S. Chithra	O. N. V. Kurup	
