= Udal (film) =

2022 film directed by Ratheesh Raghunandan

- Theatrical release poster
- Directed by: Ratheesh Raghunandan
- Written by: Ratheesh Raghunandan
- Produced by: Hazeeb Malabar
- Starring: Indrans; Durga Krishna; Dhyan Sreenivasan
- Cinematography: Manoj Pillai
- Edited by: Nishad Yousaf
- Music by: William Francis
- Production companies: Hazeebs Films; JAIHO & MGC
- Distributed by: Sree Gokulam Movies
- Release date: 20 May 2022 (India)
- Country: India
- Language: Malayalam

Udal (transl. Body) is a 2022 Indian Malayalam language drama thriller film written and directed by Ratheesh Raghunandan and produced by Gokulam Gopalan.

Udal was theatrically released on 20 May 2022. The regional OTT platform Saina Play announced on 23 December 2023, that it had acquired the digital rights to the movie 'Udal'. Streaming begins 5 January 2024.

== Plot ==
Shiny is looking after her bedridden mother-in-law and lives with her father-in-law, Kuttichan, and her son. Her husband is away for work. Her only relief is spending time with her college friend, Kiran. One night, while Kiran is visiting her, they become intimate. Afterward, Shiny tells Kiran that she is fed up with taking care of her mother-in-law for nearly four years and wants freedom from this burden. Shiny decides to kill her mother-in-law.Shiny and Kiran strangle her mother-in-law to death using a bath towel. However, they forget to remove the bath towel from the body. They both return to Shiny's room.

Later, Kuttichan goes to see his wife and finds her dead. He mourns her loss and then hears Shiny talking to someone in her room.Shiny and Kiran become tense and go back to confirm that the murder was successful. When they look at the body, they discover that the bath towel is missing.

Suddenly, they hear strange noises inside the house. When they go to check where the sounds are coming from, Kuttichan brutally attacks both of them. He is so strong that they are unable to defend themselves.Kuttichan seeks revenge by continuously attacking and injuring Shiny and Kiran. Desperate, Shiny asks Kiran to call one of his friends to the house so they can kill Kuttichan.When Kiran's friend arrives, Kiran learns about Shiny's other affairs. Meanwhile, Kuttichan kills Kiran's friend.

Realizing there is no other way out, Shiny calls her husband and blames Kiran for everything. Kiran overhears the conversation and, in a fit of rage, kills Shiny.Kuttichan then kills Kiran.The next day, an ambulance arrives and takes Kuttichan to the hospital. Before leaving, Kuttichan asks his son to see his mother one last time.When Shiny's husband enters the house, he finds it covered in blood.Only Kuttichan survives in that house.

== Cast ==
- Indrans as Kuttichayan
- Durga Krishna as Shiny
- Dhyan Sreenivasan as Kiran
- Jude Anthany Joseph as Reji (Shiny's Husband)
- Master Kannan as Jerin (Shiny's Son)
- Anjana Appukkuttan as Reena
- Arun Punalur

== Release ==
Udal was theatrically released on 20 May 2022. On 23 December 2023, regional OTT platform Saina Play announced that they had acquired the digital rights to the film and began streaming it on 5 January 2024.

== Reception ==
A critic from The Times of India rated Udal 3 out of 5 stars and wrote "Udal is definitely worth a watch". Sajin Shrijith from Cinema Express rated Udal 3.5 out of 5 stars and wrote "The ambition of Udal, however, is more in line with James Hadley Chase than Raymond Chandler or James M Cain. It has the finesse of a small airport novel you read and then forget. But it's a decent effort, nevertheless. In the midst of its overwhelming darkness, Udal also finds some time for dark humour." Shilpa S from OTTPlay rated Udal 2 out of 5 and wrote "Although Udal boasts of the talents of stars such as Indrans and Dhyan Sreenivasan, Ratheesh Reghunandan fails to weave a compelling narrative out of the claustrophobic thriller." Sangeetha KS from Samayam rated Udal 4 out of 5 and wrote "The film fills in as a seat-edge thriller beyond the family drama. Throughout the film, the scenes are taken to another level, shattering the audience's guessing what will happen in the next moment. The film received an A certificate for its sexually explicit content, obscene language, and violent scenes. It is better to watch movies without children."

Watching Udal through the Theory of Ecstasism: My Reflections Dr. R. Arunachalam There are occasions when a literary theory unexpectedly finds confirmation not in a novel or a poem but in a visual medium. My experience with the Malayalam film Udal (2022) was one such occasion. I watched the film without any intention of examining it through the lens of the Theory of Ecstasism. In fact, I expected it to be just another psychological thriller built around crime, violence, and family conflict. As the narrative unfolded, however, I realized that the film was engaging with several issues that had occupied my mind while formulating the Theory of Ecstasism. By the time the film ended, I felt that I had witnessed not merely a thriller but a visual text that could be meaningfully interpreted through the concepts of nudity, nakedness, and ecstasy. The very title of the film attracted my attention. Udal, meaning Body, immediately reminded me that the human body occupies a central place in the Theory of Ecstasism. Throughout history, the body has been viewed from different perspectives—biological, religious, philosophical, psychological, and artistic. Yet the body itself remains innocent. It neither possesses morality nor immorality. It simply exists. What transforms the body into an object of fear, shame, desire, or conflict is not the body itself but the meanings that society imposes upon it. This distinction forms the basis of my understanding of nudity and nakedness. Nudity, as I have argued elsewhere, represents the natural condition of the human body. Nakedness, on the other hand, is a psychological and cultural construction. It emerges when the body becomes burdened with secrecy, guilt, shame, possessiveness, or exploitation. The movement from nakedness to nudity is, in Ecstasist terms, a movement towards acceptance, harmony, and ultimately ecstasy. While watching Udal, I repeatedly found myself returning to this distinction. The film does not merely narrate the story of an illicit relationship and its violent consequences. Beneath the surface lies a deeper exploration of human desire, emotional imprisonment, and the consequences of concealing one's inner conflicts. Every major character appears to be struggling with an invisible burden. Their actions are driven less by external circumstances than by unresolved psychological tensions. Shiny, the central character, lives within a house that has gradually become a prison. For nearly four years she has been caring for her bedridden mother-in-law while her husband works away from home. Her daily existence is marked by routine, responsibility, and emotional isolation. The arrival of Kiran, her college friend, appears to offer an escape from this suffocating existence. Their relationship is presented not merely as physical attraction but as an attempt to recover a sense of freedom that Shiny believes she has lost. At this stage, the film does not invite the audience to pass immediate moral judgement. Instead, it encourages us to observe the gradual transformation of human emotions. Desire itself is not portrayed as evil. Loneliness is not condemned. Emotional intimacy is not presented as inherently immoral. Rather, the tragedy begins when desire becomes inseparable from deception. It is at this point that the distinction between nudity and nakedness becomes particularly relevant. From the perspective of Ecstasism, physical intimacy by itself does not constitute nakedness. Nakedness begins when intimacy is accompanied by concealment, fear, betrayal, and manipulation. Shiny and Kiran do not merely hide their relationship; they gradually allow secrecy to dominate their emotional lives. Their love no longer seeks understanding but survival. Consequently, the relationship loses its liberating quality and becomes psychologically oppressive. One of the remarkable strengths of Udal is that it communicates these emotional transitions visually rather than verbally. Long before violence enters the narrative, the atmosphere of the film suggests that something within the household has already begun to decay. The silence of the rooms, the confined interiors, the bedridden mother-in-law, and the routine movements of the characters collectively create an environment where emotional suffocation becomes almost tangible. As I watched these scenes, I felt that the house itself was functioning as a metaphor. It was no longer merely a physical structure but an extension of the minds of its inhabitants. Every room appeared to conceal a secret. Every closed door seemed to separate one emotional reality from another. The architecture of the house reflected the architecture of the human mind—a mind divided between desire and duty, freedom and responsibility, concealment and revelation. It was at this point that I became convinced that Udal deserved to be examined through the Theory of Ecstasism. The film was no longer simply narrating events; it was visualizing the psychological journey from apparent freedom to complete inner imprisonment. What fascinated me most was that this transformation was achieved not through philosophical dialogue but through the language of cinema itself. The more I reflected on the film, the more I realized that every major cinematic element—characterization, lighting, sound, editing, camera movement, and setting—was participating in this exploration of the human condition. The body remained at the centre of the narrative, but the real conflict was taking place within the mind. It is precisely this tension between the visible body and the invisible consciousness that lies at the heart of the Theory of Ecstasism.

Part II: The Body, Desire, and the Psychology of Nakedness One of the reasons Udal continued to occupy my thoughts long after I had finished watching it was its refusal to remain a simple thriller. The murder is certainly the turning point of the narrative, but it is not the real beginning of the tragedy. The tragedy begins much earlier, when the characters gradually lose the ability to live honestly with themselves. From the perspective of Ecstasism, this is precisely the point at which nudity gives way to nakedness. While formulating the Theory of Ecstasism, I often reflected on the fact that society tends to confuse these two conditions. Nudity is natural; nakedness is psychological. The body by itself carries neither guilt nor virtue. It is our attitudes towards the body that transform it into an object of fear, shame, desire or exploitation. As I watched Udal, I repeatedly felt that the film was dramatizing this distinction without consciously attempting to do so. Shiny's relationship with Kiran illustrates this idea quite powerfully. Their intimacy is not presented merely to arouse curiosity or sensationalism. Rather, it reveals the emotional vacuum in which Shiny has been living. She is physically present in her home, yet emotionally absent from it. Her husband is away. Her daily routine revolves around caring for her bedridden mother-in-law. The house has ceased to be a home and has become a place of obligation. In such circumstances, Kiran enters not simply as a lover but as an emotional refuge. At this stage, I did not find myself condemning either character. Instead, I became interested in understanding the psychological movement that the film was portraying. Human desire, by itself, is not destructive. Every human being longs for companionship, affection and recognition. Ecstasism has never regarded desire as sinful. It becomes destructive only when it loses its balance and disconnects itself from responsibility. This, I believe, is exactly what happens in Udal. The relationship gradually ceases to be an expression of emotional intimacy and becomes a conspiracy sustained by deception. The lovers are no longer searching for happiness; they are searching for escape. Once escape becomes the primary objective, every obstacle appears as an enemy to be removed. The decision to murder the bedridden mother-in-law marks a decisive transformation. From a conventional moral perspective, it is simply a criminal act. From the perspective of Ecstasism, however, it represents something deeper. It is the moment when concealed desire destroys its own humanity. The body that once symbolized affection now becomes an instrument of violence. The same hands that sought intimacy are now employed to end another human life. What fascinated me most was the symbolic role of the bath towel used in the murder. After committing the crime, Shiny and Kiran forget to remove it from the body. Later, when they return, it has mysteriously disappeared. At first glance, this appears to be a clever suspense device. Yet I could not help seeing it differently. To me, the missing towel became a powerful symbol of nakedness itself. In literature, seemingly ordinary objects often acquire extraordinary significance. Shakespeare's handkerchief in Othello is one such example. In Udal, the forgotten towel functions in a similar manner. It refuses to remain merely an object. Instead, it becomes a reminder that concealed actions can never be completely concealed. Every attempt to erase guilt leaves behind another sign of its existence. This is one of the central propositions of Ecstasism. Nakedness continually seeks concealment, but concealment itself produces further anxiety. The more one attempts to hide reality, the more powerfully that reality returns. The disappearance of the towel therefore represents not merely a narrative surprise but the psychological impossibility of escaping one's own conscience. From this point onwards, the film undergoes a remarkable transformation. The atmosphere changes completely. The domestic drama suddenly acquires the intensity of psychological horror. Every sound inside the house becomes threatening. Every movement creates uncertainty. The audience begins to experience the same fear that has already taken possession of the guilty characters. I found this shift particularly impressive because the fear does not arise from supernatural elements. It emerges entirely from the human mind. The characters are no longer frightened merely of Kuttichan; they are frightened of themselves. Their greatest enemy is no longer outside the house but within their own consciousness. This, in my opinion, is where Udal rises above the conventions of an ordinary thriller. The violence that follows is certainly physical, but its roots are psychological. Every act of aggression grows out of an earlier emotional imbalance. The murders are therefore not isolated incidents but the final manifestations of conflicts that have been silently developing from the beginning of the film. As I reflected on these scenes, I became increasingly convinced that Ecstasism provides a meaningful framework for understanding the narrative. The film demonstrates that the greatest prison is not the house in which the characters live but the mind in which they hide their desires, fears and guilt. Once nakedness dominates human consciousness, peace becomes impossible. Every decision only deepens the crisis. The more I watched the unfolding events, the more I realised that Udal was inviting its viewers to look beyond the surface of crime and punishment. It was asking a deeper question: What happens when human beings lose the courage to accept themselves? It is this question that prepares the ground for appreciating the film not merely as a psychological thriller but as a remarkable visual text. In the next part, I shall examine how the director employs cinematography, lighting, sound, editing and mise-en-scène to transform these psychological conflicts into a compelling cinematic experience. From the standpoint of Ecstasism, these visual techniques are not ornamental; they become active participants in communicating the movement from concealment to revelation, from nakedness to the possibility of self-realization.

Part III: Cinema as a Visual Language of Ecstasism One of the questions that occupied my mind after watching Udal was this: Can a film express philosophical ideas without directly discussing philosophy? The more I reflected on the film, the more convinced I became that cinema possesses a language of its own. Unlike literature, which depends upon words, cinema communicates through images, sound, silence, light, movement and rhythm. It is precisely here that Udal impressed me. The director seldom explains the psychology of the characters through lengthy dialogues. Instead, he allows the visual medium itself to communicate what the characters are unable to express in words. This realization led me to another conclusion. The Theory of Ecstasism should not remain confined to literature alone. If a theory claims to explain human experience, it must also be capable of interpreting cinema, theatre, painting and other forms of artistic expression. While watching Udal, I repeatedly found myself applying the principles of Ecstasism not merely to the story but to the very grammar of filmmaking. The first aspect that attracted my attention was the cinematography. The camera seldom behaves like an external observer. It quietly enters the emotional space of the characters. Close-up shots frequently dominate the narrative. Faces occupy the screen more often than landscapes. Eyes, expressions and moments of silence become more meaningful than spoken words. This visual strategy draws the audience into the inner world of the characters. From the perspective of Ecstasism, these close-ups reveal the gradual transition from emotional balance to psychological nakedness. The camera does not merely record faces; it exposes concealed emotions. Every hesitation, every glance and every moment of anxiety becomes part of the visual narrative. The audience is encouraged not merely to watch the characters but to participate in their emotional turbulence. Equally remarkable is the use of lighting. Throughout the film, light and darkness are carefully balanced. Many scenes are illuminated only partially, allowing shadows to dominate significant portions of the frame. Initially, I regarded this as a conventional technique employed in thriller films. On further reflection, however, I felt that the lighting possesses symbolic significance. Darkness in Udal does not simply conceal physical objects. It conceals psychological realities. The characters themselves inhabit a world where nothing is fully revealed. Their emotions remain hidden from one another. Their intentions remain concealed. Their fears remain unspoken. The visual darkness therefore becomes an extension of their inner condition. Whenever light enters the frame, it rarely offers complete clarity. Instead, it exposes fragments. A face appears for a moment. A hand becomes visible. A movement is partially revealed. This incomplete illumination beautifully corresponds to the central concern of Ecstasism. Human beings seldom understand themselves completely. Self-realization arrives gradually, often through fragments rather than sudden revelation. The setting of the film deserves equal appreciation. Almost the entire narrative unfolds within a single household. Yet the audience never experiences monotony. On the contrary, the house gradually assumes the character of a living presence. Every room acquires emotional significance. Corridors become spaces of uncertainty. Closed doors generate suspense. Staircases separate different emotional worlds. While watching these scenes, I was reminded that architecture often reflects psychology. The house in Udal is not merely a physical structure; it becomes the external manifestation of the characters' imprisoned consciousness. The walls appear to imprison not only bodies but also emotions. Every room contains memories, tensions and secrets. In Ecstasist terms, the house becomes the visible structure of invisible nakedness. Another feature that fascinated me was the editing. The rhythm of the film changes significantly after the murder. Earlier scenes unfold at a measured pace, allowing the audience to observe relationships and routines. Once violence enters the narrative, the editing becomes sharper and more fragmented. The rapid succession of images generates emotional instability. This editing pattern serves an important artistic purpose. It reproduces the disturbed psychological condition of the characters. Their minds no longer function with calmness or clarity. Thoughts become fragmented. Decisions become impulsive. Fear interrupts rationality. The editing therefore mirrors the collapse of psychological harmony. The sound design also deserves careful attention. In many films, background music dominates emotional responses. Udal adopts a different strategy. Silence repeatedly becomes more powerful than music. The creaking of doors, footsteps, breathing, the movement of objects and sudden unexplained noises acquire extraordinary significance. I found this particularly effective because silence itself becomes a dramatic presence. Ecstasism recognizes silence as an important stage in human realization. Genuine understanding often emerges not from speech but from moments of inward reflection. In Udal, however, silence produces a different effect. Instead of leading towards self-realization, it intensifies fear. The silence of the house becomes the silence of concealed guilt. One sequence particularly impressed me. After the murder, ordinary household sounds suddenly appear frightening. Nothing supernatural occurs. Yet every small noise acquires psychological weight. This transformation demonstrates the remarkable ability of cinema to convert ordinary reality into emotional experience. The audience begins to hear not merely external sounds but the echo of the characters' disturbed conscience. The performances of the principal actors further strengthen this visual language. The actors seldom depend upon exaggerated gestures. Emotional tension is communicated through restrained expressions, prolonged silences and controlled physical movements. Such performances demand active participation from the audience. Instead of telling us what the characters feel, they invite us to discover those emotions ourselves. From the standpoint of Ecstasism, this artistic restraint is highly significant. Human consciousness rarely reveals itself directly. It discloses itself gradually through behaviour, hesitation and silence. The actors successfully communicate this inner fragmentation without unnecessary theatricality. As I reflected upon all these cinematic elements, I became convinced that Udal should not be appreciated solely for its story. Its true artistic achievement lies in the manner in which every component of filmmaking contributes to a unified psychological experience. The cinematography, lighting, editing, sound, setting and performances collectively transform the narrative into a visual exploration of the human mind. By the end of the film, I no longer regarded Udal merely as a crime thriller. It had become, for me, an important cinematic text demonstrating that Ecstasism is not confined to literary criticism alone. The same principles that illuminate novels and poetry can also deepen our understanding of visual narratives. Cinema, perhaps more powerfully than literature, enables us to witness the invisible movements of human consciousness through visible artistic forms.

Part IV: Kuttichan, Shiny and Kiran – Characterization, Violence and the Search for Ecstasy One aspect of Udal that continued to engage my attention was the characterization. At first sight, the characters appear to fit into familiar categories. Shiny seems to be the dissatisfied wife, Kiran the illicit lover, and Kuttichan the ageing father-in-law. Such a reading, however, does not do justice to the complexity of the film. As I reflected upon their actions through the lens of Ecstasism, I realized that none of them could be reduced to conventional labels of hero, heroine or villain. Each character represents a particular stage in the psychological journey from harmony to conflict. My first reaction was one of sympathy towards Shiny. Caring for a bedridden mother-in-law for nearly four years, in the absence of her husband, is undoubtedly an exhausting responsibility. The film neither romanticizes nor exaggerates her suffering. Instead, it quietly presents the emotional fatigue that has accumulated within her over the years. Her loneliness is real. Her frustration is understandable. Her longing for companionship appears perfectly human. For this reason, I found it difficult to condemn her at the beginning of the film. Ecstasism has never denied the reality of human desire. Emotional intimacy, companionship and physical affection are integral dimensions of human existence. The body naturally seeks love, and the mind naturally seeks understanding. These aspirations belong to what I have described elsewhere as the condition of nudity—a state in which human existence remains close to its natural self. Yet the tragedy of Shiny begins when her search for emotional fulfilment gradually loses its ethical centre. Desire itself is not the problem. The problem begins when desire demands the destruction of another human being in order to secure its own satisfaction. At that moment, her journey moves decisively from nudity into nakedness. Kiran, too, deserves closer examination. He is not portrayed as an inherently cruel individual. Initially, he appears affectionate and supportive. Nevertheless, his affection lacks responsibility. He enters Shiny's life as an escape rather than as a source of emotional stability. Instead of helping her confront her circumstances, he encourages a path of concealment. Their relationship therefore becomes increasingly dependent upon secrecy rather than openness. This, I believe, is one of the subtle strengths of the screenplay. Neither Shiny nor Kiran suddenly becomes violent. Violence emerges gradually from emotional dishonesty. The film suggests that every act of physical violence has its origins in earlier psychological compromises. From the perspective of Ecstasism, nakedness rarely appears suddenly. It develops slowly through repeated acts of concealment until it eventually dominates human behaviour. The character who fascinated me most, however, was Kuttichan. Initially, the audience sees him as an elderly father caring for his bedridden wife. Nothing suggests that he will become the dominant force in the narrative. Yet after the murder, the entire emotional centre of the film shifts towards him. His transformation is so unexpected that many viewers may regard it simply as a dramatic twist designed to sustain suspense. My own response was somewhat different. I began to see Kuttichan less as an individual character and more as a symbolic presence. He appears almost like the embodiment of truth that refuses to disappear. The guilty characters assume that they have removed every obstacle from their path. Instead, they encounter a force far more powerful than they anticipated. His extraordinary physical strength has often been questioned on grounds of realism. I did not find this particularly disturbing. Cinema frequently employs symbolic exaggeration to communicate psychological truths. From the perspective of Ecstasism, Kuttichan's strength need not be interpreted literally. Rather, it represents the overwhelming force of suppressed reality. No matter how carefully human beings conceal their actions, truth eventually returns with greater intensity. His revenge therefore acquires a philosophical dimension. He is not merely avenging the death of his wife. He becomes the visible expression of a moral order that the guilty characters can neither control nor escape. Every blow he delivers appears to shatter not only their bodies but also the illusion that concealed wrongdoing can permanently remain concealed. Another aspect that impressed me was the gradual reversal of power relationships. At the beginning of the film, Shiny and Kiran believe themselves to be in control. They make plans. They decide the future. They imagine that they possess complete freedom over their lives. After the murder, however, they lose that control almost immediately. Their confidence gives way to fear. Their courage disappears. Every decision becomes reactive rather than deliberate. This reversal beautifully illustrates one of the central insights of Ecstasism. Nakedness initially creates an illusion of freedom. Human beings imagine that by removing obstacles they will achieve happiness. In reality, every dishonest action creates new forms of imprisonment. The greater the concealment, the greater becomes the anxiety. What appeared to be liberation gradually becomes psychological slavery. I was equally struck by the film's refusal to glorify violence. Although the confrontations are brutal, they never become spectacles of entertainment. The violence remains painful, exhausting and emotionally disturbing. This artistic restraint enhances the seriousness of the narrative. Bloodshed is presented not as heroism but as the inevitable consequence of emotional and moral collapse. Perhaps the most tragic aspect of the film is that none of the principal characters attains peace. Every attempt to secure personal happiness ends in greater destruction. Even survival carries little sense of triumph. The audience is left contemplating not victory or defeat but the devastating consequences of choices rooted in concealment rather than acceptance. As I reflected upon the film, I became increasingly convinced that Udal is not fundamentally about murder. It is about the gradual disintegration of human consciousness. The murders merely reveal what has already taken place within the minds of the characters. Long before blood is spilled, harmony has already disappeared. This realization strengthened my conviction that Ecstasism offers a fruitful way of approaching cinema. The theory does not merely analyse the visible actions of characters. It attempts to understand the invisible psychological movements that generate those actions. In Udal, every major character illustrates a different stage in that journey—from longing to deception, from deception to violence, and finally from violence to irreversible loss. The film thus becomes more than a thriller. It becomes a profound meditation on the fragile relationship between the human body, human desire and human consciousness. Whether one agrees with the actions of the characters or not, one cannot escape the uncomfortable realization that the greatest battles in life are fought not outside but within the human mind.

Part V: Udal as a Visual Praxis of Ecstasism – Concluding Reflections When I completed watching Udal, I did not immediately arrive at any theoretical conclusion. Like most viewers, I was initially overwhelmed by the intensity of the violence and the psychological tension that dominates the latter half of the film. It was only after allowing the film to settle in my mind that I began to revisit several scenes. Each viewing strengthened my conviction that Udal is far more than an adult psychological thriller. It is a film that compels us to reflect upon the complex relationship between the body, desire, morality and self-awareness. My experience with this film has also strengthened my confidence in the wider applicability of the Theory of Ecstasism. While developing the theory, I was primarily concerned with literary texts. Gradually, I realised that literature is only one among many forms through which human consciousness expresses itself. Cinema, perhaps more than any other art form, possesses the unique ability to combine visual images, sound, silence, movement and emotion into a unified artistic experience. If Ecstasism seeks to understand human experience, it must necessarily extend its scope beyond literature into cinema. The very title Udal invited such an extension. The body occupies the centre of the narrative, but the film repeatedly demonstrates that the body alone is never the source of either happiness or suffering. The real conflict arises from the meanings that individuals attach to the body. When the body becomes an instrument of love, care and acceptance, it participates in the condition that Ecstasism describes as nudity. When it becomes entangled in concealment, betrayal, possessiveness and violence, it enters the realm of nakedness. One of the remarkable achievements of the film is that it never attempts to preach. It does not offer philosophical lectures, nor does it force moral conclusions upon the audience. Instead, it trusts the intelligence of its viewers. Every major incident invites reflection rather than judgement. This artistic restraint deserves appreciation because genuine art raises questions instead of supplying ready-made answers. While reflecting on the film, I also became aware of another important aspect of Ecstasism. Human beings often mistake freedom for the absence of restraint. The characters in Udal believe that by removing obstacles they will attain happiness. Ironically, every attempt to secure freedom through deception only produces greater bondage. Their psychological prison becomes more oppressive than the domestic circumstances from which they originally wished to escape. This paradox lies at the heart of the film. Freedom cannot be built upon concealment. Peace cannot emerge from violence. Emotional fulfilment cannot be achieved by denying another person's humanity. The tragedy of the film therefore does not begin with murder; it begins with the gradual erosion of honesty within the human mind. The ending of the film left a lasting impression on me. Almost every principal character is destroyed. Only Kuttichan survives. I found this conclusion symbolically significant. His survival may be interpreted in several ways, but from the standpoint of Ecstasism it suggests the endurance of reality itself. Human beings may suppress truth for a time, but they cannot eliminate it. Reality eventually outlives deception. This does not mean that Kuttichan represents absolute moral perfection. The film wisely avoids such simplifications. Rather, his survival reminds us that every human action ultimately encounters consequences beyond individual control. Ecstasism similarly maintains that human beings cannot permanently escape the psychological consequences of their own choices. As I reflected further, another thought occurred to me. Throughout the film, every character seeks ecstasy in one form or another. Shiny longs for emotional liberation. Kiran seeks physical intimacy. Kuttichan seeks justice for his murdered wife. Yet none of them attains true ecstasy because each remains imprisoned within a particular form of attachment. Their experiences repeatedly demonstrate that ecstasy cannot be reduced to pleasure, revenge or temporary satisfaction. Genuine ecstasy demands acceptance, harmony and inner integration. This, perhaps, is the most valuable insight that Udal offered me. The film does not illustrate Ecstasism by presenting ideal characters who attain perfect self-realization. Instead, it demonstrates the consequences of failing to move beyond nakedness. By portraying psychological fragmentation with remarkable artistic intensity, it indirectly reveals the necessity of the very harmony that Ecstasism seeks to understand. From the perspective of filmmaking, Udal deserves recognition for the disciplined manner in which all its artistic components contribute to a unified vision. The screenplay, performances, cinematography, lighting, editing, sound design and setting are not isolated technical achievements. They work together to create a powerful psychological atmosphere in which the viewer experiences the characters' emotional conflicts rather than merely observing them. Such integration is one of the hallmarks of mature cinema. My engagement with Udal has therefore convinced me that the Theory of Ecstasism possesses considerable potential for film criticism. Just as it has enabled me to reinterpret works by Raja Rao, Shakespeare, Thirukkural and several contemporary writers, it also provides a fresh perspective for understanding cinema. The language changes from words to images, but the fundamental concerns remain the same. Human beings continue to struggle with desire, concealment, identity, fear and the search for meaning. I therefore regard Udal not simply as a successful Malayalam film but as an important visual text that invites philosophical inquiry. Whether the director consciously intended such an interpretation is ultimately irrelevant. Great works of art often generate meanings beyond the conscious intentions of their creators. In this respect, Udal provides fertile ground for applying the Theory of Ecstasism and demonstrates that the theory can illuminate not only literary narratives but also the rich and complex language of cinema. Looking back on my experience of watching the film, I feel that Udal has become another milestone in my continuing intellectual journey. Every serious work of art teaches us something about ourselves. This film reminded me once again that the greatest conflicts are not fought between individuals but within the human mind. It is there that the journey from nakedness to nudity, and from fragmentation to ecstasy, truly begins.
