= Iyer in Arabia =

2024 Indian Malayalam comedy,family film by M A Nishad

- Theatrical release poster
- Directed by: M. A. Nishad
- Written by: M. A. Nishad
- Produced by: Vignesh Vijayakumar
- Starring: Mukesh; Urvasi; Dhyan Sreenivasan; Shine Tom Chacko; Durga Krishna
- Edited by: Johnkutty
- Music by: Anand Madhusoodanan
- Production company: Wealth I Productions
- Distributed by: MAN Media
- Release date: 2 February 2024
- Country: India
- Language: Malayalam

Iyer in Arabia is a 2024 Indian Malayalam-language comedy film, directed by M. A. Nishad, starring Mukesh, Urvashi, Dhyan Sreenivasan, Shine Tom Chacko and Durga Krishna in lead roles. It was initially named Iyer Kanda Dubai. It was theatrically released on 2 February 2024.

== Plot ==
The film follows a family's journey to the Middle East. Sreenivasa Iyer is an orthodox Brahmin who strongly clings to his traditional beliefs. His wife, Jhansi Rani, on the other hand, is a history professor and an atheist. Their son, Rahul, a straightforward and practical young man, travels to the Middle East for a job. Iyer later discovers that his son is involved with a girl from a different religion and intends to marry her.

Determined to stop the relationship, Iyer travels to the Middle East with his wife. However, a series of incidents there opens his eyes to a completely different world and gradually forces him to confront and reconsider his regressive beliefs. The mistakes Iyer makes in both thought and action during the trip are portrayed with sarcasm throughout the film. The contrast between the rigid mindset of a devout believer and the rational outlook of an atheist is humorously depicted, forming the central theme of the movie.

== Cast ==
- Mukesh as Sreenivasa Iyer
- Urvasi as Thansi Rani
- Dhyan Sreenivasan as Rahul Sreenivasan
- Shine Tom Chacko as Freddy
- Durga Krishna as Zahra
- Dayana Hameed as Tania
- Biju Sopanam as Thomaskutty
- Jaffar Idukki as Koya Sahib
- Sohan Seenulal as Fasal
- Kalabhavan Prajod as Shemeer
- Ullas Panthalam as Flat Security Sahadevan
- Sudheer Karamana as Adv. Jaganraj
- Sunil Sukhada as Pramukh Gopal
- Alencier Ley Lopez as Shubhair Hajji
- Maniyanpilla Raju as Rashid
- Uma Nair as Suma Jaganraj
- Divya M. Nair as Zerina
- Veena Nair as Nazeema
- Kailash as Dr.Abhilash
- Jayakumar Parameswaran Pillai as Major Soman Pillai
- Jayasankar as Shishupalan
- Sreelatha Namboothiri as Pankajakshi
- Reshmi Anil as Pavithra

== Production ==
The film was announced in January 2023, with production initially underway under the title Iyer Kanda Dubai (transl. The Dubai Iyer saw). Filming for the project took place in Dubai and was completed by July 2023. In October 2023, it was reported that the film's title had been changed to Iyer in Arabia.

== Soundtrack ==
The music was composed by Anand Madhusoodanan, with lyrics written by Rafeeq Ahamed, Manu Manjith, B. K. Harinarayanan, Prabha Varma.

Track listing
No.	Title	Lyrics	Singer(s)	Length
1.	"Iyyeru Kanda Dubai"	Manu Manjith	Mithun Jayaraj, Minnale Nazeer, Aswin Vijayan, Bharath Sajikumar, Anand Madhusoodanan	2:14
2.	"Thiruvananthapurame"	Rafeeq Ahamed	Mithun Jayaraj, Karthika Nair, Bhima	3:34
3.	"Mazhavil Poovayi"	B. K. Harinarayanan	Vijay Yesudas, Nithya Mammen	4:10
4.	"Parayaathe Parayunnathellam"	Prabha Varma	K. S. Chitra, Shahabaz Aman	5:05
Total length:				15:03

== Reception ==
A critic from Times Now rated the film three out of five stars and wrote, "Iyer in Arabia is a delightful rollercoaster of emotions, blending humour seamlessly with family dynamics. The film's ensemble cast, coupled with the director's vision, suggests a successful recipe for an entertaining cinematic experience." Swathi P. Ajith of Onmanorama wrote, "Although the movie started with a promising theme, it deviated from its path by following cliches, leaving the audience with a sense of disconnect. Director M A Nishad's well-intentioned efforts to incorporate feel-good elements seemed somewhat forced and didn't seamlessly integrate into the story. Despite these shortcomings, certain comedic elements, like Mukesh's character attempting to spy on his son with a fake Facebook ID, were indeed really funny."

Arjun Ramachandran of The South First gave the film two-and-a-half out of five stars and wrote, "Iyer in Arabia is a satirical movie with a cliched plot. It is a time-pass entertainer." Rashmi Kuttan of Asianet News wrote, "The film tries to expose the audience to the beliefs that are being politicized in the current situation with a little laugh. Iyer in Arabia ridicules the shrinking within the walls of religion and irrationally succumbing to the blindness of faith."
