= Mukalparappu =

2023 Malayalam film by Siby Padiyara

Mukalpparappu
- Poster
- Directed by: Siby Padiyara
- Written by: Siby Padiyara; J. P. Thavarool
- Produced by: J. P. Thavarool
- Starring: Mamukkoya; Lishoy; Urmila Unni
- Cinematography: Shiji Jayadevan; Nithin K. Raj
- Edited by: Linson Raphael
- Music by: Pramod Sarang; Geogy Thomas; Allen Varghese
- Production company: Jyothis Vision
- Release date: 8 September 2023
- Running time: 144 minutes
- Country: India
- Language: Malayalam

Mukalpparappu is a 2023 Indian Malayalam-language drama film directed by Siby Padiyara and produced by J. P. Thavarool. The film stars Mamukkoya, Lishoy, Urmila Unni, Aparna Janardhanan, Sunil Surya, Sivadas Mattannur and Unniraj Cheruvathur. It is the last movie Mamukkoya acted before his death.

== Cast ==
- Mamukkoya
- Lishoy
- Urmila Unni
- Sunil Surya
- Aparna Janardhanan
- Sivadas Mattannur
- Unniraj Cheruvathur

== Plot ==
Priyesh is the son of a well-known theyyam artist in village Kuruvakkunnu Village. He is an engineering graduate and has no interest in the ritual arts followed by his father and used to roam lazily. Later Priyesh fall in love with a girl who has keen interest in theyyam. The movie is about what happens further with these conflicts

== Release ==
=== Theatrical ===
The film was initially planned to be released on 1 September 2023 and later, it was released in theatres on 8 September 2023.

== Reception ==
=== Critical reception ===
Princy Alexander of Onmanorama wrote "'Mukalparappu', might not be everyone's cup of tea, since it is not overly commercial. However, it is definitely a good film with an important message."
