= Miriam Maa =

2023 Indian Tamil-language drama film

- Promotional poster
- Directed by: Malathy Narayan
- Starring: Rekha; Ezhil Durai; Ashiq Hussain
- Cinematography: Jason Williams
- Edited by: Kamalakannan K
- Music by: Moonroxx
- Production company: Sri Sai Film Factory
- Distributed by: Action Reaction Jenish
- Release date: 22 December 2023
- Country: India
- Language: Tamil

Miriam Maa is a 2023 Indian Tamil-language drama film written and directed by Malathy Narayan. The film stars Rekha, Ezhil Durai and Ashiq Hussain in the lead roles. The film was released theatrically on 22 December 2023.

== Cast ==
- Rekha
- Ezhil Durai
- Ashiq Hussain
- Malathy Narayan
- Sneha Kumar
- Anitha Sampath

== Production ==
The first look poster of the film was released in June 2023, with the makers announcing that the film would narrate the story of a 50-year-old who undergoes IVF treatment to get pregnant. Rekha Harris was cast in the lead role, with debutant director Malathy Narayan also appearing in the film as an actress. The shoot of the film took place throughout late 2023, and was majorly shot in Korukkupet.

== Release and reception ==
The film had a theatrical release on 22 December 2023 across Tamil Nadu. A critic from Times of India wrote that "the well-written characters from the world of Miriam Maa totally deserved to be presented in a better light". A reviewer from Dina Thanthi also gave the film a positive review, praising Rekha's performance.
