= Rekha Harris =

Indian actress

Rekha
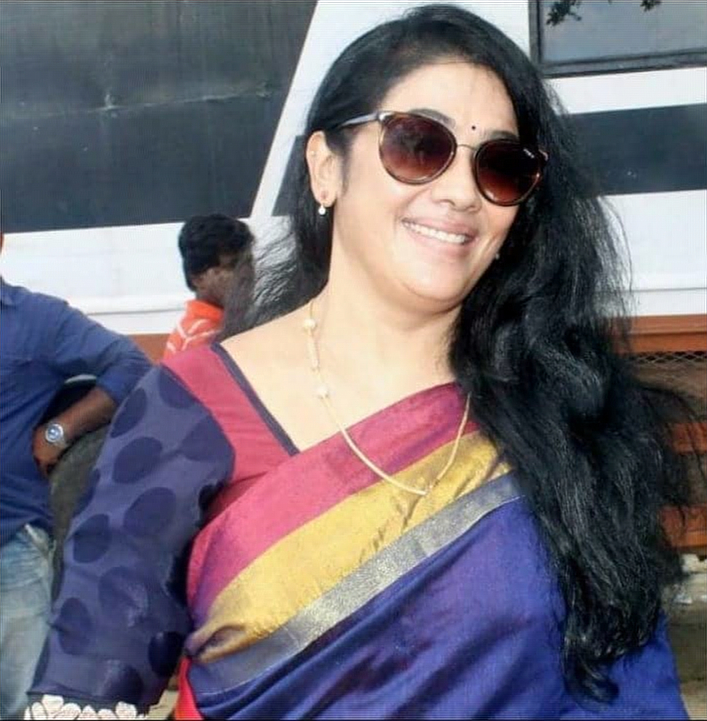
- Born: Sumathi Josephine
- Occupation: Actress
- Years active: 1986–1996; 2002–present
- Spouse: Harris Kottadath (m. 1996)
- Children: 1

Sumathi Josephine, better known by her stage name Rekha, is an Indian actress who predominantly works in Tamil and Malayalam films. She also starred in a few Telugu and Kannada films.She was one of the contestants of Bigg Boss Tamil Season 4.

== Career ==
She was introduced to the Tamil cinema with the film, Kadalora Kavithaigal (1986) directed by Bharathiraja.

Her notable works include Punnagai Mannan (1986), Enga Ooru Pattukaran (1987), En Bommukutty Ammavukku (1988), Puriyaadha Pudhir (1990) and Gunaa (1991). In Malayalam, Ramji Rao Speaking (1989), Aey Auto (1990) and In Harihar Nagar (1990) were also successful.

She won the Filmfare Award for Best Actress – Malayalam for the film Dasharatham (1989).

After a few roles as a heroine, she started to act in character roles, such as sister-in-law and mother.

In 2020, she is entering as a contestant in the reality show Bigg Boss 4.

== Personal life ==
Sumathi Josephine was born and brought up in Eramalloor, Alappuzha Kerala. She married Harris Kottadath, a Malayali seafood exporter, in 1996. They have a daughter.

== Filmography ==
=== Tamil ===
Year	Film	Role	Notes
1986	Kadalora Kavithaigal	Jennifer	Debut film
1986	Punnagai Mannan	Ranjani	
1986	Namma Ooru Nalla Ooru	Seetha	
1987	Solvathellam Unmai	Rekha	
1987	Megam Karuththirukku	Chithra	
1987	Idhu Oru Thodar Kathai	Radha	
1987	Enga Ooru Pattukaran	Kaveri	
1987	Kavalan Avan Kovalan	Uma Chakravarthy	
1987	Ini Oru Sudhanthiram	Kannamma	
1987	Aankalai Nambathey	Soorya	
1987	Veeran Veluthambi	Meghala	
1987	Ninaive Oru Sangeetham	Sandhya	
1987	Krishnan Vandhaan	Sumathi	
1987	Ullam Kavarntha Kalvan	Geetha	
1987	Meendum Mahaan	Julie	
1987	Arul Tharum Ayyappan	Lakshmi	
1987	Chinnamanikkuyile	Unknown	Unreleased
1988	Shenbagamae Shenbagamae	Shenbagam	
1988	Kaalaiyum Neeye Maalaiyum Neeye	Shanthi	
1988	Makkal Aanaiyittal	Kamala	
1988	Katha Nayagan	Radha	
1988	Raasave Unnai Nambi	Ranjitham	
1988	En Bommukutty Ammavukku	Mercy	
1988	Naan Sonnathey Sattam	Aasha	
1988	Kazhugumalai Kallan	-	
1988	Thambi Thanga Kambi	Uma	
1988	Mappillai Sir	Uma	
1988	Dhayam Onnu	Shanthi	
1989	En Purushanthaan Enakku Mattumthaan	Vatsala	
1989	Pillaikkaga	Kannamma	
1989	Moodu Manthiram	Kalpana	
1989	Thangamana Purushan	Sumalatha	
1989	Thaya Tharama	Uma	
1989	Kutravali	Radha	
1989	Kakka Kadi		
1989	Thalaivanukkor Thalaivi	Thenmozhi	
1989	Idhaya Geetham	Divya	
1990	Paattukku Naan Adimai	Sandhya	
1990	Varavu Nalla Uravu	Uma	
1990	Sigappu Nirathil Chinnappoo	Kasturi	
1990	Vedikkai En Vadikkai	Neelaveni	
1990	Puriyaadha Pudhir	Geetha Chakravarthi	
1990	Thiyagu	Vidhya	
1990	Nangal Puthiyavargal	Bharathi	
1991	Sigaram	Sukanya	
1991	Irumbu Pookkal	Pavunnu	Guest Appearance
1991	Nallathai Naadu Kekum	Radha	
1991	Vaidehi Kalyanam	Vasanthi	
1991	Paattondru Ketten	Usha	
1991	Gunaa	Rosie	
1991	Sirai Kadhavugal	Durga	
1992	Enga Veetu Velan	Kalyani	
1992	Idhuthanda Sattam	Lakshmi	
1992	Annaamalai	Shanthi	
1992	David Uncle	Malathi	
1992	Annan Ennada Thambi Ennada	Priyanka	
1992	Thirumathi Palanisamy	Jyothi	Guest Appearance
1992	Vasantha Malargal	Daisy	
1992	Palaivana Raagangal		
1992	Harihara Puthiran		
1994	Rasa Magan	Chellachamy's wife	
1994	Vaa Magale Vaa	Kalyani	
1996	Kaalam Maari Pochu	Lakshmi	
1996	Krishna	Anandhi	
1996	Gnanapazham	Professor Nirmala	
1996	Priyam	Aunty	
2002	Roja Kootam	Bhumika's mom, inspector	Comeback film after her marriage
2003	Anbu	Veena's mother	
2003	Kadhal Sadugudu	Kausalya's mother	
2003	Villain	Rajalakshmi	
2003	Vikatan	Ramu's mother	
2004	Kovil	Angel's mother	
2004	Arul	Ganapathy's wife	
2005	Aadum Koothu	Manimekhala's mother	
2005	Anbe Vaa	Karthik's mother	
2005	Priyasakhi	Judge	
2006	Madhu	Jennifer	
2006	Amirtham	Pasupathi Pillai's wife	
2006	Thodamaley	Narmada	
2007	Pokkiri	Mrs. Mohammed Maideen Khan	
2007	Malaikottai	Malar's mother	
2008	Dasavathaaram	Meenakshi	
2008	Inba	Priya's sister in law	
2008	Pazhani	Poovathal (Pazhanivel's mother)	
2009	Madhavi	Lakshmi	
2009	Adada Enna Azhagu	Vasan's mother	
2010	Thairiyam	Kumaran's mother	
2010	Thambi Arjuna	Radhika's mother	
2010	Uthama Puthiran	Meenakshi	
2010	Indrasena	-	
2010	Ilamai Itho Itho		
2011	Marudhavelu	Vidhya Venugopalan's mother	
2013	Thalaivaa	Ganga Ramadurai	Guest Appearance
2013	Ya Ya	Ramarajan's mother	
2013	Sibi	Lakshmi	
2014	Vazhum Dheivam	Durga	
2015	Rombha Nallavan Da Nee	A. SowmiyaKannan - IPS	
2015	Achaaram	Suriya's mother	
2015	Sakalakala Vallavan	Meenakshi	
2015	Maanga	Samyuktha	
2016	Bangalore Naatkal	Sarah's mother	
2016	Sowkarpettai	Shakthi's / Vetri's mother	
2016	Vellikizhamai 13am Thethi	Saravanan's mother	
2017	Muthuramalingam	Ashok Pandian's mother	
2017	En Aaloda Seruppa Kaanom	Sandhya's mother	
2018	Keni	Judge	
2018	Diya	Thulasi' mother	
2018	Goli Soda 2	Seetha Kumari	
2018	Pyaar Prema Kaadhal	Sree's mother	
2018	Antony	Antony's mother	
2019	Dharmaprabhu	Ayyo	
2019	100% Kadhal	Aruna	
2020	Dagaalty	Malli's mother	
2021	Chidambaram Railwaygate	Thillaiamma	
2021	Pei Mama	Jothi	
2021	Raajavamsam	Rani	
2021	Plan Panni Pannanum	Ambal's mother	
2023	Miriam Maa	Miriam	
2026	Sandakkari		Unreleased film

=== Malayalam ===
Year	Title	Role	Notes
1989	Ramji Rao Speaking	Rani	
1990	Dasharatham	Annie	Winner: Filmfare Award for Best Actress – Malayalam
1990	Oliyambukal	Usha	
1990	Arhatha	Anju	
1990	Aey Auto	Meenakshi	
1990	Randam Varavu	Indu Jayakumar	
1990	In Harihar Nagar	Annie Philip/Sr Josephine	
1990	Lal Salam	Stella	
1990	Pavam Pavam Rajakumaran	Radhika	
1991	Sundarikakka	Princy John	
1991	Swanthwanam	Gayathri	
1991	Pookkalam Varavayi	Nirmala	
1991	Kizhakkunarum Pakshi	Meera	
1991	Adayalam	Latha	
1991	Nettipattom	Indu	
1992	Vasudha	Vasudha	
1992	Grihapravsam	Radhika	
1993	Janam	Gomathiyamma	
1993	Sarovaram	Devu	
1993	Yaadhavam	Jayanthi	
1993	Pamaram		
1993	Kudumbasneham		
1994	Bheeshmacharya	Shanthi	
1994	Manathe Vellitheru	Julie	
1994	Harichandanam		
1995	Kidilol Kidilam	Raji	
1995	Thakshashila	Lakshmi	
1995	Mumpe Parakkunna Pakshi		
1997	Sankeerthanam Pole	Joyamma	
1997	Poonilamazha	Leena	
2005	Naran	Sunanda	
2006	Chinthamani Kolacase	Lal Krishna's sister	
2006	Pachakuthira	Akash's foster mother	
2006	Prajapathi	Narayanan's mother	
2006	Jayam	Bhanumathi	
2007	Veeralipattu	Gayathri	
2007	Avan Chandiyude Makan	Ealikutty	
2007	Nagaram	Mayor Sreelatha Varma	
2008	Chandranilekkoru Vazhi	Sulochana Kumaran	
2009	Vairam: Fight for Justice	Dr. Susan	
2009	Ivar Vivahitharayal	Adv. Nandini	
2009	2 Harihar Nagar	Annie Philip/Sr. Josephine	
2010	Kadaksham	Rosamma	
2012	My Boss	Priya's mother	
2012	Asuravithu	Sara Shaikh Muhammed	
2012	No. 66 Madhura Bus	Subhadra	
2013	Annum Innum Ennum	Indu	
2013	3G Third Generation	Manu's mother	
2014	Bangalore Days	Sarah's mother	
2015	My God	-	
2015	Jo and the Boy	Catherine	
2016	PachakKallam	Viswanathan's wife	
2017	Vedham	Nirmala Devi	
2019	Edakkad Battalion 06	Surayya	
2021	Kunjeldho	Kunjeldho's mother	
2022	Dear Friend	Vijayakumari Viswanathan	
2024	Guruvayoor Ambalanadayil	Raji	
2025	Randam Yaamam	Savithri	

=== Telugu ===
Year	Film	Role	Notes
1989	Rudranetra	Swarnarekha	
1989	Bala Gopaludu	Khantham	
1991	Minor Raja	Seeta	
1991	Sarpayagam	Santhi	
1991	Teneteega	Aparna	
1993	Kondapalli Raja	Shanthi	
1995	Muddayi Muddugumma	Shobha	
2008	Veedu Mamoolodu Kadu	Lakshmi	
2012	Money Money, More Money	Geetha Maadhuri	
2018	Kanam	Thulasi's mother	

=== Kannada ===
Year	Film	Role	Notes
1987	Poornachandra	Kumuda	
1992	Nanna Shathru	Asha	

== Television ==
=== Serials ===
Year	Serial	Role	Channel	Language
1996	Sudigundalu	Gayathri	ETV	Telugu
2000	Micro Thodar Macro Sinthanaigal - Oru Kadayin Sila Kilai Kadaigal		Raj TV	Tamil
2000	Micro Thodargal Macro Sinthanaigal - Savukkadi	Devanai	Raj TV	Tamil
2001–2004	Ninne Pelladatha	Seetha	Gemini TV	Telugu
2003	Velan		Sun TV	Tamil
2006–2009	Kana Kaanum Kaalangal	Lakshmi	Vijay TV	Tamil
2006	Neelakkurinju Veendum Pookkunnu		Surya TV	Malayalam
2007	Mandharam	Aparna	Kairali TV	Malayalam
2021	Baakiyalakshmi	Herself	Star Vijay	Tamil
2022–2023	Bharathi Kannamma	Sharmila	Star Vijay	Tamil
2024	My Perfectt Husband	Bharathi	Disney+ Hotstar	Tamil
2024	Kanyadanam	Rathnaprabha	Surya TV	Malayalam

=== Shows ===
Year	Title	Role	Channel	Language
2010	Rani Maharani	Surya TV	Participant	Malayalam
2011–2012	Comedy Festival Season 1	Mazhavil Manorama	Judge	Malayalam
2012	Nakshathradeepangal	Kairali TV	Judge	Malayalam
2014	Badai Bungalow	Asianet	Guest	Malayalam
2016	Comedy Super Nite	Flowers TV	Guest	Malayalam
2016–2017	Malayali Veetamma	Flowers TV	Judge	Malayalam
2017	Onnum Onnum Moonu	Mazhavil Manorama	Guest	Malayalam
2017	Lal Salam	Amrita TV	Guest	Malayalam
2018	Urvashi Theatres	Asianet	Mentor	Malayalam
2018	Vanakkam Tamizha	Sun TV	Guest	Tamil
2019–2020	Cooku with Comali	Star Vijay	Contestant	Tamil
2020	Bigg Boss 4	Star Vijay	Contestant	Tamil
2021	Bigg Boss Kondattam	Star Vijay	Guest	Tamil
2021	Cooku with Comali (season 2)	Star Vijay	Guest	Tamil
2021	Red Carpet	Amrita TV	Mentor	Malayalam
2022	Top Singer season 2	Flowers TV	Judge	Malayalam
2022	Comedy Stars Season 3	Asianet	Judge	Malayalam

== Awards ==
- Filmfare Award for Best Actress – Malayalam - Dasharatham
- Kalaimamani Award by Tamil Nadu Government
