= Nagaram (2007 film) =

- Film poster
- Directed by: M. A. Nishad
- Screenplay by: Rajan Kiriyath
- Story by: M. A. Nishad
- Produced by: Manju Thomas
- Starring: Kalabhavan Mani; Biju Menon; Lakshmi Sharma; Gopika; Thilakan; Salim Kumar; Rajan P. Dev
- Cinematography: Sadat
- Edited by: P.C. Mohanan
- Music by: Mohan Sithara
- Distributed by: EMIL and ERIC Digital Films Pvt Ltd.
- Release date: 22 June 2007
- Country: India
- Language: Malayalam

Nagaram is a 2007 Indian Malayalam film, directed by M. A. Nishad, starring Kalabhavan Mani, Biju Menon, Gopika and Lakshmi Sharma in the lead roles. Nagaram deals with social and environmental issues of utmost relevance. M.A. Nishad presented these issues in a story form.

== Plot ==
Each and every city and town in Kerala are facing a severe problem because of disposal of tons of waste. The focus here is on Cochin Corporation which is facing a similar crisis on waste management. Lalgudy Nanappan has taken the quotation for waste removal, but he has not found any suitable place to dispose the waste. The Mayor of the city, Prof. Sreelatha Varma, a politician with ethics doesn't sanction Nanappan's bills and all the works associated comes to a stand still. At the same time mayor cannot answer to the questions raised by the opposition members. Nanappan has good support from many members inside the corporation. His supporters are opposition leader in the City Council Stephen, Parasuraman an MLA of the area, Advocate Eenasu who is a legal consultant to the ruling party, and the State Health Minister.

Nanappan decided to dump the garbage in Sivaramapuram village with the support of corrupted politicians. Sivaramapuram is a village of calm and serene beauty where people living peacefully away from corruptions and pollutions. Ponnayya Thevar's family owned three-fourths of the land in Sivaramapura. Majority of the villagers were farmers doing agriculture by leasing land from Thevar. Thevar was always hungry for making money. Lalgudy manages to impress Thevar by agreeing a big amount as rental for giving space for waste disposal. Waste from the city starts flowing to Sivaramapuram. The villagers are made to believe with the help of Vasukuttan, a popular peer group leader, that a Waste Treatment Plant will come very soon in the village, thus providing employment to many. They are unaware of the environmental problems that are soon to engulf them.

== Cast ==
- Biju Menon as Dr Raveendran
- Kalabhavan Mani as Ponnayaya Thevar
- Gopika as Radhika
- Lakshmi Sharma as Mayamma
- Thilakan as Judge
- Ashokan as Stephen
- Master Dananjay as Mayamma's Son
- Salim Kumar as Lalkuzhi Nanappan
- Rajan P. Dev as Lonappan
- Harisree Ashokan as Parashuraman
- Seema as Chintamani Ammalu
- Rekha as Mayor Sreelatha Varma
- Nithya Das as Poonkodi
- Nisha Sarrang as Seetha
- Sudheesh as Vasu kuttan
- Subi Suresh as Sugandhavally
- Baburaj as Lorence
- Riza Bava as Adv.Enashu
- V. K. Sreeraman as Vaidyar
- Anil Murali as S.I Sugunan
- Zeenath as Dr.Sisily
- Nandan as Shanku
- Narayanankutty
- Jaffer Idukki as Kodali

== Reception ==
A critic from Indiaglitz wrote that "This time with an impressive storyline, Director M A Nishaad has graduated in film making, but still the film needs much to be desired to get converted into an interesting stuff".
