= Oru Anweshanathinte Thudakkam =

Indian thriller film

- Theatrical release poster
- Directed by: M. A. Nishad
- Written by: M. A. Nishad
- Produced by: K V Abdul Nazar
- Starring: Shine Tom Chacko; Sshivada
- Cinematography: Vivekh Menon
- Edited by: Johnkutty
- Music by: Songs; M. Jayachandran; Score: Manoj Sharrma
- Production company: Benzy Productions
- Release date: 8 November 2024
- Country: India
- Language: Malayalam

Oru Anweshanathinte Thudakkam (transl. The beginning of an investigation) is a 2024 Indian Malayalam-language police procedural crime thriller film directed by M. A. Nishad starring Shine Tom Chacko and Vani Viswanath, and also featuring Sshivada, Swasika, Durga Krishna, Anumol, Manju Pillai, Samuthirakani, Mukesh and Nishad.

== Cast ==
- Shine Tom Chacko as Journalist Jeeven Thomas
- Vani Viswanath as Sivamalli, Tenkasi Bhagavathipuram Village Don
- Sshivada as Ruby, Jeevan's Love Interest
- Swasika as Kottayam Crime Branch SP Sreya Menon IPS
- Durga Krishna as Kottayam Crime Branch Inspector Soumya
- Anumol as Annie Alex, Stephen's ex-lover and secondary antagonist
- Samuthirakani as SP S.Vetrivel IPS, Tamil Nadu Police, Tenkasi SP
- Mukesh as Crime Branch Ernakulam Range IG Premkumar IPS
- M. A. Nishad as Kottayam Crime Branch DYSP Issac Maman
- Kalabhavan Shajohn as Thommi Thekkumkala
- Baiju Santhosh as Sunil Mani, A Journalist
- Johny Antony as Kuriakose, Issac's Friend
- Alexander Prasanth as Inspector Prathapan
- Kottayam Nazeer as Seban/Thankachan
- Vijay Babu as Idukki MP Stephen,main antagonist
- Ashokan as DGP Thomas Koshi IPS
- Sudheesh as Ubaid
- Sudheer Karamana as Adv. Vinayachandran, Jeevan's Advocate
- Sminu Sijo as Judge
- Manju Pillai as Mollykutty, Issac's Wife
- Irshad as Dr. Babu Joseph
- Jaffar Idukki as Avarachan
- Ramesh Pisharody as Rajesh, Jeevan's friend
- Shaheen Siddique as Kottayam Crime Branch SI Habeeb Mohammad
- Kailash as Coach Suresh Babu
- Biju Sopanam as Kottayam Crime Branch ASI Achuthan
- Saikumar as Bishop Mar Chrystostom
- Kalabhavan Navas as Baby, Jeevan's Brother-In-Law
- P. Sreekumar as Joseph, Volga Bar MD and Annie's Father-In-Law
- Jayakrishnan as Alex, Annie's Husband
- Abhija Sivakala as Kaari Shantha
- Mallika as Liji
- Ponnamma Babu as Mariamma, Annie's Mother-In-Law
- Uma Nair as Asha
- Aneesh Gopal as Aneesh
- Chembil Ashokan as Thampi
- Sandhya Manoj as Tara, A Journalist

== Production ==
The film was shot in Dubai; Kochi, Kottayam, Kuttalam and Kuttikkanam in Kerala; Punjab; and Tenkasi, Tamil Nadu.

== Soundtrack ==
The songs were composed by M. Jayachandran.

- "Aale Patha" - Akila Ravindran (lyrics by Palani Bharathi [Tamil])
- "Kaalam Thelinju" - Kapil Kapilan, Nikhil Raj, and Jaswinder Singh Sangha (lyrics by Prabha Varma, Kunwar Juneja [Punjabi])

== Reception ==
Anna Mathews of The Times of India rated the film 3/5 and wrote, "Writer-director MA Nishad's Oru Anveishinathinte Thudakam starts strong, but gets a bit problematic with overwriting and over direction". Princy Alexander of Onmanorama wrote, "If Anweshipin Kandethum and Thalavan topped the list of best investigation thrillers this year, Nishad's Oru Anveshanathinte Thudakkam is also equally good". Rohit Panikker of Times Now rated the film 3/5 and wrote, "Oru Anweshanathinte Thudakkam is a satisfactory watch despite its tendency to wear out the audience's patience through its long runtime".
