= Kuttymama =

- Theatrical release poster
- Directed by: V. M. Vinu
- Screenplay by: Manaf
- Produced by: Gokulam Gopalan
- Starring: Sreenivasan; Dhyan Sreenivasan; Durga Krishna; Meera Vasudev
- Cinematography: Varun Vinu
- Edited by: Shameer Muhammed
- Music by: Achu Rajamani
- Production company: Sree Gokulam Movies
- Distributed by: Sree Gokulam Films Release
- Release date: 17 May 2019 (India)
- Running time: 134 minutes
- Country: India
- Language: Malayalam

Kuttymama is a 2019 Indian Malayalam-language action comedy-drama film directed by V. M. Vinu and starring Sreenivasan, Dhyan Sreenivasan, Durga Krishna, Meera Vasudev and Manju Pathrose in the leading roles. The songs were composed by Achu Rajamani, a talented musician.

== Plot ==
A retired military officer, Major Shekharankutty nicknamed Kuttymama has become a nuisance to others of his village because of his bragging nature. But later, the whole country flatter him positively.

== Cast ==
- Sreenivasan as Major Shekarankutty (Kuttymama)
  - Dhyan Sreenivasan as adult Shekarankutty
    - Amal Shah as Teenager Shekarankutty
- Meera Vasudev as Anjali
  - Durga Krishna as young Anjali
- Krittika Pradeep
- Rony Raj as Doctor Vimal
- Janardanan as a retired soldier
- Shivaji Guruvayoor
- Manju Pathrose as Athira, Shekarankutty'younger sister
- Bejoy Johnson
- Sasi Kalinga as Tea Shop Owner
- Santhosh Keezhattoor as Bank Manager Koshi
- Vinod Kovoor as marriage broker
- Prem Kumar
- Vishak Nair as Sachin
- Nirmal Palazhi
- Indian Pallassery
- Bheeman Raghu as a retired soldier
- Kalabhavan Rahman as Taxi driver
- Ponnambalam as Gounder
