= Nagaravadhu (film) =

2001 film by Kaladharan

- Directed by: Kaladharan
- Screenplay by: Rajan Kiriyath
- Story by: Gopala Chandran Kaarakkal (G. C. Kaarakkal)
- Produced by: Mani C. Kappan
- Starring: Vani Viswanath; Sai Kumar; Rajan P. Dev; Jayakrishnan; Mani C. Kappan
- Cinematography: Saloo George
- Edited by: L. Bhoominathan
- Music by: Film score: Rajamani; Songs: M. Jayachandran
- Production company: Okay Productions
- Distributed by: Emil and Eric
- Release date: 30 November 2001
- Country: India
- Language: Malayalam

Nagaravadhu is a 2001 Malayalam film directed by Kaladharan and starring Vani Viswanath, Sai Kumar, N. F. Varghese, Rajan P. Dev, Jayakrishnan, Baiju, Janardhanan, Spadikam George, Harishree Ashokan, Premachandran and Indrans.

== Cast ==
- Vani Viswanath as Sukanya
- Sai Kumar as Narendra Babuji
- N. F. Varghese as Hrishikesh Parameswaran Nampoothiri IPS
- Baiju as Eby Kuruvila
- Rajan P. Dev as Mamaji
- Jayakrishnan as Harshan
- Janardhanan as Kesari Govinda Pillai
- Spadikam George as DYSP Sadhanandhan
- Harishree Ashokan
- Ponnamma Babu as Akkama Tharakan
- V. D. Rajappan
- Premachandran
- Indrans
- Srividhya
- Mani C. Kappan as Tripathi

== Soundtrack ==
All songs are written by Prabha Varma.

- "Chillaattam (female)" - Sujatha Mohan
- "Chillaattam (male)" - Alex Kayyalakkal
- Mehbooba" - Vidhu Prathap, Sujatha Sathyan, Nikhil Krishna, Manu Vijayan
- "Pakalinnu" - G Venugopal
- "Pakalinnu (version 2)" - G Venugopal
- "Poonthen Nermozhi (female)" - KS Chithra
- "Poonthen Nermozhi (male)" - G Venugopal
- "Thai Piranthaal (female)" - KS Chithra
- "Thai Piranthaal (male)" - MG Sreekumar
