= Durga Krishna =

Indian actress (born 1996)

- Occupation: Actress
- Years active: 2017–present
- Spouse: Arjun R (m. 2021)

Durga Krishna is an Indian actress who works in Malayalam films.

== Early life ==
She was born in Kozhikode, Kerala, India.

== Personal life ==
On 5 April 2021, Krishna married Arjun Ravindran, producer of the film Confessions of a Cuckoo.

== Filmography ==
=== Films ===
Year	Title	Role	Notes	Ref.
2017	Vimaanam	Janaki		
2018	Pretham 2	Anu Thankam Paulose		
2019	Kuttymama	Anjaly Junior		
2019	Love Action Drama	Swathy		
2021	Confessions of a Cuckoo	Sherin		
2022	Udal	Shiny		
2022	Twenty One Hours	Madhuri Menon	Debut and only Kannada film till date	
2022	Kudukku 2025	Eve		
2022	King Fish	Kalindhi Paul		
2023	Anuragam	Neetha		
2024	Iyer In Arabia	Saira		
2024	Manorathangal	Nabeesa	Anthology series Segment:Olavum Theeravum Released on ZEE5	
2024	Oru Anweshanathinte Thudakkam	CI Soumya		
2024	Thankamani	Mercy Mani Peter		
TBA	Ram †	Meera		

=== Television ===
Year	Title	Role	Network	Ref.
2022-2023	Dancing Stars	Judge	Asianet	
