= No. 66 Madhura Bus =

- Movie Released
- Directed by: M. A. Nishad
- Written by: K. V. Anil
- Produced by: M. A. Nishad
- Starring: Pasupathy; Mallika; Padmapriya; Shwetha Menon; Makarand Deshpande
- Cinematography: Pradeep Nair
- Music by: M. Jayachandran (Songs); Rajamani (Background Score)
- Release date: 29 June 2012
- Country: India
- Language: Malayalam

No. 66 Madhura Bus is a 2012 Malayalam-language road crime thriller movie directed by M. A. Nishad and stars Pasupathy, Padmapriya, Mallika, Shwetha Menon and Makarand Deshpande in pivotal roles. The screenplay is by noted author K. V. Anil. A journey of love and revenge, the film's story unfolds amidst the travel of an interstate bus. M. A. Nishad, has earlier directed Pakal, Nagaram, Aayudham, Vairam and quite recently Best of Luck. M.Jayachandran composed the musical score for the film with lyrics written by Vayalar Sharathchandra Verma and Rajiv Alunkal.

== Cast ==
- Pasupathy as BFO A. Varadarajan
- Padmapriya as Sooryapadma
- Shwetha Menon as Rita Mathew Mammen, Jail Welfare Officer
- Mallika as Bhavayami, Varadan's wife
- Makarand Deshpande as Sanjayan (voiceover by Shammi Thilakan), the main antagonist
  - Abatis Thokalath as Young Sanjayan
- Thilakan as Vettaikaran Varkey
- Jagathy Sreekumar as Mathaikutty, Bus Conductor
- Vijay Babu as DFO Ravichandran
- Jagadish as SI Kristhudas, the secondary antagonist
- Sudheer Karamana as Parameshwaran
- Anil Murali as Antappan, Varkey's son
- Seema G. Nair as Sumithra, Padma's sister and Parameshwaran's wife
- Rekha as Subhadra, Ravichandran's sister
- Sasi Kalinga as Swami
- Lishoy as CF Adikeshavan, Ravichandran's and Subhadra's father
- Chembil Ashokan as Arumugam
- Sathaar as Jailer Koshy

== Awards ==
Ceremony	Category	Nominee	Result
2nd South Indian International Movie Awards	Best Actor in a Negative Role	Makarand Deshpande	Nominated
