= Kinar (film) =

2018 film by M. A. Nishad

Kinar / Keni
- Directed by: M. A. Nishad
- Screenplay by: Anwar Abdulla; Aju K. Narayanan
- Produced by: Sajeev P. K. Anne Sajeev
- Starring: Jaya Prada; Revathi
- Cinematography: Noushad Shereef
- Edited by: Sreekumar Nair
- Music by: Songs: M. Jayachandran; Kallara Gopan; Score: Bijibal (Malayalam); Sam C. S. (Tamil)
- Production company: Fragrant Nature Film Creations
- Release date: 23 February 2018
- Country: India
- Languages: Malayalam; Tamil

Kinar (Well in Malayalam), titled Keni (transl. Well in Tamil) in, is a 2018 Indian drama film co-written and directed by M. A. Nishad. It was produced by the studio of Fragrant Nature Film Creations, and was made simultaneously in Malayalam and Tamil. Focusing on the issue of water scarcity in a town between Kerala and Tamil Nadu, the film stars Jaya Prada and Revathi, with different sets of ensemble cast for the two versions. M. Jayachandran and Kallara Gopan composed the soundtrack while Bijibal composed the score. Noushad Shereef was director of photography and Sreekumar Nair edited the film. Both versions were released worldwide on 23 February 2018. The Malayalam version received positive reviews while the Tamil version received negative reviews. Both versions were box-office bombs.

== Cast ==
Cast (Malayalam)	Cast (Tamil)	Role (Malayalam)	Role (Tamil)
Jaya Prada		Indira	Indira
Revathi		Aruna	Aruna
Pasupathy	Parthiban	Sakthivel	Sakthivel
Archana	Anu Hasan	Suganthi	Suganthi
Parvathy Nambiar		Razeena	Razeena
Thalaivasal Vijay		Minister	Minister
Joy Mathew		Hariharan P.	Hariharan P.
Kailash		Sameer	Sameer
Seema	Rekha	High Court Judge	High Court Judge
Renji Panicker	Nassar	Advocate	Advocate
Sunil Sukhada		Lazar Kunnamkulam	Lazar Kunnamkulam
Bhagath Manuel		Nanda Kumar	Nanda Kumar
Maala Parvathi		Liya Rajeev	Liya Rajeev
Indrans		Khadar Uppapa	Khadar Uppapa
K. J. Yesudas		Cameo appearance in the song "Ayya Sami"	Cameo appearance in the song "Ayya Sami"
S. P. Balasubrahmanyam		Cameo appearance in the song "Ayya Sami"	Cameo appearance in the song "Ayya Sami"
Tamil version
M. S. Bhaskar as Vidisadaiyor; Chaams as Suruli; Pandi as Pavadaisamy

== Production ==
Directed by Malayalam filmmaker M. A. Nishad, the story revolves around a water dispute that crops up between the people of Tamil Nadu and Kerala on account of a well, with the film taking place in 1965 when Kerala was formed as a separate state. Jaya Prada revealed that her political experience of seeing people through problems of water scarcity motivated her to sign the film and play the lead role. Portraying the widow of a geologist, who wants to fulfil her husband's desire to make water available to all, she stated the story "fell in the category of ‘meaningful cinema’" and that she was keen to be a part of such attempts. Revathy was signed to portray a collector of the Tamil Nadu village of Thirunelveli, which faces a water shortage every year. She was selected after the original choice, Suhasini opted out citing date issues. Nishad chose to shoot two versions, one in Malayalam and the other in Tamil, where each party would have the stronger cause.

The Malayalam version of the film was shot first during May 2017, with most of the scenes being shot at the Punalur Municipality and Chemmanthur High School premises. Scenes were also shot in Thiruvananthapuram during the same month, where a launch ceremony was held. The film was later shot in Tamil with Parthiban, Nassar, Anu Hasan and Rekha amongst others joining the cast.

== Soundtrack ==
Kinar / Keni

Soundtrack album by M. Jayachandran & Kallara Gopan
- Released: 7 February 2018
- Genre: Feature film soundtrack
- Label: Muzik247

The film features a song titled "Ayya Sami", sung by S. P. Balasubrahmanyam and K. J. Yesudas, who worked together after a break of twenty seven years following Thalapathi (1991) for the song "Kaatukkuyilu Manasukkula". The song's lyrics narrates the celebration of Tamil Nadu and Kerala cultures, and was composed by M. Jayachandran and written by B. K. Harinarayanan and Palani Bharathi. The soundtracks were released simultaneously at an event on 7 February 2018, with the lead cast in both languages in attendance.

Malayalam version

No.	Title	Lyrics	Music	Singer(s)	Length
1.	"Ayya Sami"	B. K. Harinarayanan, Palani Bharathi	M. Jayachandran	K. J. Yesudas, S. P. Balasubrahmanyam	4:43
2.	"Mazhavil Kaavile"	Prabha Varma	M. Jayachandran	Sithara Krishnakumar	4:02
3.	"Alakkuvanaakumoo (Male Version)"	Sheela Paul	Kallara Gopan	Kallara Gopan	4:15
4.	"Alakkuvanaakumoo (Female Version)"	Sheela Paul		Varsha Haridas	4:16
5.	Untitled		Kallara Gopan

Tamil version

No.	Title	Lyrics	Music	Singer(s)	Length
1.	"Ayya Sami"	B. K. Harinarayanan, Palani Bharathi	M. Jayachandran	K. J. Yesudas, S. P. Balasubrahmanyam	4:43
2.	"Kalayum Meghame"	Palani Bharathi	M. Jayachandran	Sithara Krishnakumar	3:58
3.	"Vedithidum Bhoomi"	Palani Bharathi	Kallara Gopan	Vijay Yesudas	4:16

== Release ==
The Malayalam version received positive reviews for its bold take, but the Tamil version received negative reviews with the portions retained from Malayalam being criticized.
