= M. A. Nishad =

Indian film director and screenwriter

M A Nishad
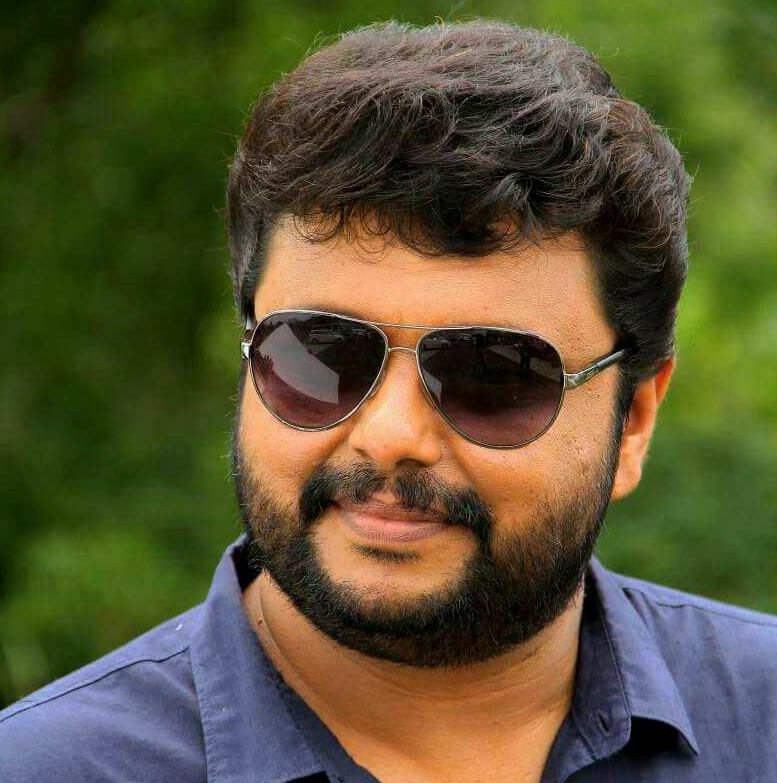
- M A Nishad
- Born: Kollam, Kerala, India
- Education: TKM College of Engineering, Kollam
- Occupations: Film Director; Producer; Scriptwriter; Actor
- Years active: 1997–present

M. A. Nishad is an Indian film director and screenwriter who has worked predominantly on Malayalam films.

== Career ==
Nishad has often made social dramas in Malayalam, starting his career with Pakal (2006) and Nagaram (2007). In 2009, he worked with Suresh Gopi and Pasupathy on Vairam: Fight for Justice, which was later dubbed into Tamil as Ammu Kolai Vazhakku. In the early 2010s, his Gandhi Square featuring Thilakan failed to materialise. In 2012, he filed a complaint against actress Padmapriya and her manager for raising the cost of his film, No. 66 Madhura Bus (2012).

In 2015, Nishad spoke out against the content from the film, Kohinoor (2015). His actions implied that the makers of the film had tried to make a big film and imitated the style of big films and stars to make it but at last ended up as a mediocre imitation. In 2018, he made Kinar, a bilingual film focusing on the issue of water scarcity in a town bordering Kerala and Tamil Nadu, and the film starred Jaya Prada and Revathi in the lead roles, with different ensemble casts for the two versions.

== Filmography ==
- All films are in Malayalam, otherwise noted the language

Year	Title	Credited as			Notes
Year	Title	Director	Writer	Producer	Notes
1997	Oral Mathram	No	No	Yes	
1999	Dreams	No	No	Yes	
2003	Thillana Thillana	No	No	Yes	
2006	Pakal	Yes	No	No	Directorial Debut
2007	Nagaram	Yes	Yes	No	
2008	Aayudham	Yes	Yes	No	
2009	Vairam	Yes	No	No	
2010	Best of Luck	Yes	No	No	
2012	No. 66 Madhura Bus	Yes	No	Yes	
2018	Kinar	Yes	Yes	No	Bilingual film
2018	Keni	Yes	Yes	No	Bilingual film
2019	Thelivu	Yes	No	No	
2024	Iyer In Arabia	Yes	Yes	No	
2024	Oru Anweshanathinte Thudakkam	Yes	Yes	No	
2026	Lurk †	Yes	No	No	

=== As actor ===
Year	Title	Role	Notes
1982	Anthiveyilile Ponnu		Child Artist
2014	Oru Korean Padam	Adv. Prakash Mathew	
2015	Valiya Chirakulla Pakshikal	Lawyer of DYFI	
2015	She Taxi	SP	
2016	Ore Mugham	Juby Ninan(Older)	
2016	Keni	Truck Driver	
2017	Vaakku	Chandran	
2017	Choolam	Kannan Nair	
2019	Lessons	Radhakrishnan Nair	
2022	Two Men	Abukka	
2022	Bharatha Circus	CI Jayachandran Nair	
2023	Iyer In Arabia	Dr Mathew	
2023	Mr Hacker	Minister	
2024	Oru Anweshanathinte Thudakkam	DySP Issac Maammen	
2024	Vivekanandan Vairalanu	Film Director	
2026	Ankam Attahasam	Luke Francis	
2026	Lurk	Jayaram Kalyana Raman	

=== Awards ===
Award	Year	Category	Film	result
Kerala Film Critics Association	2006	Best debutant director	PAKAL	Won
Singapore Film Association	2006	Best Director	PAKAL	Won
Kerala Critics award	2009	socially committed movie	VAIRAM	Won
Kerala film critics	2016	Special Jury	VAKKU	Won
Kerala State film award	2017	Best story writer	KINAR	Won
Kerala Critics Association	2017	Best Director	KINAR	Won
FOKANA award Philadelphia USA	2018	Best Director	KINAR	Won
J C Foundation award	2019	Best film	KINAR	Won
Kerala Film Critics association	2022	Special Jury	TWO MEN	Won
UFFC international award Dubai	2024	Best actor	TWO MEN	Won
Srilankan International Film Festival (UFMC)	2025	Best Actor	LURK	Won
