= Manorathangal =

Indian anthology television series

- Genre: Drama; Anthology
- Based on: Short stories by M. T. Vasudevan Nair
- Written by: M. T. Vasudevan Nair
- Directed by: Priyadarshan; Santhosh Sivan; Ranjith; Jayaraj; Shyamaprasad; Mahesh Narayanan; Ratheesh Ambat; Aswathy V. Nair
- Starring: Mammootty; Mohanlal; Biju Menon; Asif Ali; Fahadh Faasil; Madhoo; Parvathy Thiruvothu; Surabhi Lakshmi; Siddique; Aparna Balamurali
- Narrated by: Kamal Haasan
- Composers: M. Jayachandran; Ouseppachan; Bijibal; Ramesh Narayan; Rajesh Murugesan; Rahul Raj; Jakes Bejoy; Saeed Abbas
- Country of origin: India
- Original language: Malayalam
- No. of seasons: 1
- No. of episodes: 9

Production
- Producer: Rohandeep Singh
- Running time: 402 minutes
- Production companies: Saregama; Jumping Tomato Studios; Newsvalue Productions

Original release
- Network: ZEE5
- Release: 15 August 2024

Manorathangal (transl. Mindscapes) is a 2024 Indian Malayalam-language anthology streaming television series. The anthology features nine featurettes based on M. T. Vasudevan Nair's nine short stories. Aswathy V Nair, daughter of Vasudevan Nair, is the creative director of the film. Titles of the featurettes are Olavum Theeravum, Kadugannawa; Oru Yathra Kurippu, Sherlock, Silalikhitham, Vilpana, Kadalkkaattu, Kazhcha, Abhayam Thedi Veendum, and Swargam Thurakkuna Samayam.

The anthology is presented by Kamal Haasan. It comprises an ensemble cast including Mammootty, Mohanlal, Fahadh Faasil, Biju Menon, Nedumudi Venu, Siddique, Indrajith Sukumaran, Asif Ali, Mamukkoya, Vineeth, Indrans, Madhoo, Aparna Balamurali, Parvathy Thiruvothu, Surabhi Lakshmi, and Ann Augustine. The anthology released on 15 August 2024 on ZEE5.

== Cast ==
- Kamal Haasan as Narrator for all the segments

=== Kadugannawa, Oru Yathra Kurippu ===
- Mammootty as Adult Venugopal
- Vineeth as Venugopal's father
- Anumol as Venugopal's mother

=== Olavum Theeravum ===
- Mohanlal as Baputty
- Surabhi Lakshmi as Beevathu
- Durga Krishna as Nabeesa
- Hareesh Peradi as Kunjali
- Mamukkoya as Mammadikka

=== Kazhcha ===
- Parvathy Thiruvothu as Sudha
- Harish Uthaman as Vishwanathan
- Narain as Prabhakaran
- Kalamandalam Saraswathy as Grandma
- Manju Pathrose as Sumathi

=== Shilalikhitam ===
- Biju Menon as Gopalankutty
- Sshivada as Sarala
- Shanthi Krishna as Malu amma
- Joy Mathew as Raghavan Mama
- T. G. Ravi as Parameshwaran
- Manikandan Pattambi as Kumaran Mash
- Nila Bharathi as Renu
- Geethi Sangeetha as Kurumba
- Nandu Poduval as Eroman
- Krittika Pradeep as Narayani
- Hareesh Pengan as Uzhuthura Warrier

=== Vilpana ===
- Asif Ali as Sunil Das
- Madhoo as Gita Parekh
- Sreejith Ravi as broker Balu
- Chitra Iyer as visitor
- Ujjwal Chopra as Mr. Parekh

=== Sherlock ===
- Fahadh Faasil as Balu
- Nadhiya as Balu's elder sister
- Cat as Sherlock

=== Swargam Thurakkuna Samayam ===
- Surabhi Lakshmi as Sita
- Kailash as Achu
- Indrans as Kuttinarayanan
- Nedumudi Venu as Madhavan Mash
- Renji Panicker as Pathmanabhan
- Jayakumar Parameswaran Pillai

=== Abhyam Theedi Veendum ===
- Siddique as The Man
- Ishit Yamini as The Woman
- Naseer Sankranthi as Karyasthan

=== Kadalkkaattu ===
- Aparna Balamurali as Bharathi
- Indrajith Sukumaran as Keshav
- Ann Augustine as Margaret
- Sanju Sivram as Vincent

== Episodes ==
Title	Director	Writer(s)	Music director	Cinematographer	Editor
Olavum Theeravum	Priyadarshan	MT Vasudevan Nair	Bijibal	Santosh Sivan	MS Aiyappan Nair
Kadugannawa, Oru Yathra Kurippu	Ranjith	MT Vasudevan Nair	Bijibal	Sujith Vassudev, Prasanth Raveendran	Manoj Kannoth
Kazhcha	Shyamaprasad	MT Vasudevan Nair	Ouseppachan	Nimish Ravi	Vinod Sukumaran
Shilalikhitam	Priyadarshan	MT Vasudevan Nair	Rajesh Murugesan	Divakar Mani	MS Aiyappan Nair
Vilpana	Ashwathy V Nair	MT Vasudevan Nair	Bijibal	Divakar Mani	Dilip Damodar
Sherlock	Mahesh Narayanan	MT Vasudevan Nair	Saeed Abbas	Mahesh Narayanan	Rahul Radhakrishnan
Swargam Thurakkuna Samayam	Jayaraj	MT Vasudevan Nair	Ramesh Narayan	Nikhil S. Praveen	CR Sreejith
Abhyam Theedi Veendum	Santosh Sivan	MT Vasudevan Nair	Jakes Bejoy	Santosh Sivan	Dilip Damodar
Kadalkkaattu	Rathish Ambat	MT Vasudevan Nair	Rahul Raj	Lokanathan	Dilip Damodar

== Production ==
The anthology consists of nine short stories by M. T. Vasudevan Nair. It was conceptualised by Nair's daughter, Aswathy V. Nair, during the COVID-19 pandemic to commemorate his 90th birthday. Initially, she selected 20 stories, but eventually narrowed it down to 10, and finally settled on nine. While her initial intention was to focus on stories with female protagonists, she also included stories with male protagonists after discovering several compelling narratives. Explaining her decision, she stated, "I wanted women as the protagonists but discovered many wonderful stories with male protagonists. Ultimately, I chose stories with an abiding human element, with emotions of love, lust, greed and revenge, etc". Aswathy also directed one segment titled Vilpana. According to Onmanorama, the anthology draws inspiration from Stories by Rabindranath Tagore (2015), a television series based on the works of poet Rabindranath Tagore.

Aswathy served as the creative producer. The series began production in 2021. By January 2022, six of the films had completed production, including Silalikhitham, Vilpana, Kadalkkaattu, Kazhcha, Abhayam Thedi Veendum, and Swargam Thurakkuna Samayam. Priyadarshan-directed Olavum Theeravum is a remake of the 1970 film of the same name. It began production on 10 July 2022 and wrapped up on 17 July 2022. Priyadarshan also directed Silalikhitham. Kadugannawa Oru Yathra was initially supposed to be directed by Lijo Jose Pellissery. But Ranjith replaced him and began production on 16 August 2022 and wrapped up on 26 August 2022. Olavum Theeravum completed filming in July 2022 in Thodupuzha, which was made in black-and-white format. Initially, the series was produced for Netflix, but the platform rejected the anthology reportedly due to the addition of new segments starring Mohanlal, Mammootty, and Fahadh Faasil which increased the production cost. Later, ZEE5 acquired the series.the series was co-produced by Anil Thampi and Chandana Thampi

== Release ==
The trailer of the anthology released on 15 July 2024 on Occasion of M.T. Vasudevan Nair's birthday. The series will release on the OTT platform ZEE5. The series was initially planned for release in September on Occasion of Onam but later advanced to 15 August 2024. Apart from Malayalam, the series is also released in Hindi, Tamil, Telugu, and Kannada languages.

== Controversy ==
During the trailer launch of the series, Asif Ali was supposed to present a memento to Ramesh Narayan, but Ramesh allegedly refused to accept it from the actor, leading to widespread criticism about his behaviour. He responded that he was music director of Jayaraj's segment of the series, but he didn't get invited to stage on launch event and he was disappointed. He also clarified that he didn't hear the announcement and didn't know that Asif Ali is presenting the momento.

== Reception ==
A review in the Indian Express found, the anthology film "has some standout segments, some that are decent and others that fall short." while The Hindu too stated it contained "a few hidden gems". The Hindustan Times praised the poetic achievement of the production.
