= Vairam: Fight for Justice =

- Theatrical poster
- Directed by: M. A. Nishad
- Written by: Cheriyan Kalpakavadi
- Produced by: N.Shiva Rao
- Starring: Suresh Gopi; Pasupathi; Jayasurya; Mukesh; Dhanya Mary Varghese; Samvrutha Sunil
- Cinematography: Sanjeev Sankar
- Edited by: Samjith Mohd
- Music by: M. Jayachandran
- Distributed by: Cinema NSR India Pvt Ltd
- Release date: 20 September 2009
- Country: India
- Language: Malayalam

Vairam: Fight for Justice is a 2009 Malayalam crime drama thriller film directed by M. A. Nishad under the banner of Cinema NSR India Pvt Ltd. Production controller Sanjay Padiyoor. The main cast includes Suresh Gopi, Pasupathy, Jayasurya, Mukesh, Samvrutha Sunil, and Dhanya Mary Varghese.

== Plot ==
Vairam tells the story of Sivarajan who fights for justice, as he loses his daughter Vairamani who is raped and killed. When the law is blinded by political and monetary power, he has no other option than to hunt down Thalikkulam Josekutty who hails from an influential Achayan family in Thodupuzha.

An investigative journalist of a popular magazine, Annie Jacob digs up the whole story, which becomes a sensation. An offbeat advocate Ravi Varma takes up the case for re-investigation. The SP of the Crime Branch, Thomas Erali IPS, investigates the crime with great zeal, and then the real truth is exposed. The advocate, police officer, and the journalist start the fight for justice together. The movie also tells a small love story between journalist Annie Jacob and advocate Ravi Varma.

== Cast ==
- Suresh Gopi as Advocate Ravi Varma (extended cameo)
- Pasupathi as Sivarajan
- Jayasurya as Thalikkulam Josekutty,The Main Antagonist
- Mukesh as SP Thomas Eerali IPS, Crime Branch (extended cameo)
- Samvrutha Sunil as Annie Jacob
- Dhanya Mary Varghese as Vairamani Sivarajan
- Meera Vasudevan as Devi Sivarajan
- Thilakan as Thalikkulam Avarachan
- K. P. A. C. Lalitha
- Harisree Asokan as Sugunan
- Ashokan as Thalikkulam George Kutty
- Sai Kumar
- Tini Tom as nooruddin, Thomas Eerali's subordinate
- Bhama
- Rekha as Dr.Susan Jacob
- Ambika as Magistrate
- Sreelatha Namboothiri as sivarajan's mother and vairamani's grandmother
- Sudheer Karamana as Albert
- Ambika Mohan as Albert's & Rosy's mother

== Soundtrack ==
The music was composed by M Jayachandran, with lyrics written by Gireesh Puthenchery.

No.	Song	Singers	Lyrics	Length (m:ss)
1	"Munthirikkurunnu"	Vijay Yesudas	Gireesh Puthenchery	
2	"Nattu Paattu Ketto"	Shankar Mahadevan	Gireesh Puthenchery	
3	"Vennilaavu Kannu Vacha"	K. J. Yesudas	Gireesh Puthenchery	

== Production ==
The film is loosely based on the Krishnapriya murder case. The plot also resembles with the 1996 film A Time To Kill. After being shot at various locations mainly in Thodupuzha, the film was released on 20 September 2009.
