= List of Malayalam films of 1998 =

The following is a list of Malayalam films released in 1998.

Opening		Film	Cast	Director	Music director	Notes
J A N	5	Sreekrishnapurathe Nakshathrathilakkam	Nagma, Jagathy Sreekumar, Innocent, KPAC Lalitha, Cochin Haneefa	Rajasenan	Berny Ignatius	
J A N	8	Kudumba Vaarthakal	Jagadish, Jagathy Sreekumar, Rehana Navas	Ali Akbar	Berny-Ignatius	
J A N	26	Kanmadam	Mohanlal, Manju Warrier	A. K. Lohithadas	Raveendran	
F E B	6	Nakshatratharattu	Kunchako Boban, Shalini	K. Shankar	Mohan Sithara	
F E B	23	Pranayavarnangal	Suresh Gopi, Manju Warrier, Biju Menon, Divya Unni	Sibi Malayil	Vidyasagar	
M A R	8	Elavamkodu Desam	Mammootty, Rajeev, Khushbu	K. G. George	Vidyasagar	
M A R	13	Kusruthi Kuruppu	Jayaram, Meena	Venugopan	Johnson	
M A R	19	Sidhartha	Mammootty, Rambha	Jomon	Vidyasagar	
M A R	26	Amma Ammaayiyamma	Mukesh, Sukanya, Sukumari,	Sandhya Mohan	M. S. Viswanathan	
A P R	8	Vismayam	Dileep, Innocent	Raghunath Paleri	Johnson	
M A Y	6	Gloria Fernandes from USA	Babu Antony, Reena	P. G. Vishwambharan		
M A Y	21	Kaikudunna Nilavu	Jayaram, Ranjitha, Dileep, Shalini	Kamal	Kaithapram	
M A Y	21	Summer in Bethlehem	Suresh Gopi, Jayaram, Manju Warrier	Sibi Malayil	Vidyasagar	
J U N	3	Anuragakottaram	Dileep, Suvalakshmi	Vinayan	Ilayaraja	
J U N	9	Kallu Kondoru Pennu	Vijayshanti, Suresh Gopi	Shyamaprasad	Ilaiyaraaja	
J U N	19	Oru Maravathoor Kanavu	Mammootty, Biju Menon, Mohini, Divya Unni	Lal Jose	Vidyasagar	
J U L	18	Oro Viliyum Kathorthu	Mukesh, Sukumari, Suma Kanakala	V. M. Vinu	Berny-Ignatius	
J U L	16	Harikrishnans	Mohanlal, Mammootty, Juhi Chawla	Fazil	Ouseppachan	
J U L	19	Mangalya Pallakku	Sreenivasan, Jagadish, Kasthuri	Vinod Roshan	BalabhaskarRajamani	
J U L	30	Ayal Kadha Ezhuthukayanu	Mohanlal, Sreenivasan, Nandhini	Kamal	Raveendran	
S E P	4	Punjabi House	Dileep, Mohini, Lal	Rafi Mecartin	Suresh Peters	
O C T	1	British Market	Vijayaraghavan, Jagathy Sreekumar	Nizar	Rajamani	
O C T	15	Chinthavishtayaya Shyamala	Sangita, Sreenivasan	Sreenivasan	Johnson	
O C T	15	Manthri Maalikayil Manasammatham	George Vishnu. Jagathy Sreekumar, Dileep	Kalabhavan Ansar	Berny-Ignatius	
O C T	23	Rakthasakshikal Sindabad	Mohanlal, Suresh Gopi, Sukanya	Venu Nagavalli	M. G. Radhakrishnan	
N O V	3	Meenathil Thalikettu	Dileep, Sulekha	Rajan Sankaradi	Ouseppachen	
N O V	6	Mayajalam	Mukesh, Vineetha	Balu Kiriyath	S. P. Venkatesh	
N O V	6	Mayilpeelikkavu	Kunchako Boban, Jomol	Anil	Berny Ignatius	
N O V	29	Sneham	Jayaram, Jomol, Biju Menon, Kasthuri	Jayaraj	Perumbavoor G. Raveendranath	
N O V	30	Kottaram Veettile Apputtan	Jayaram, Shruti	Rajasenan	Berny-Ignatius	
N O V	30	Sundarakilladi	Dileep, Shalini	Muralikrishnan		
D E C	25	Meenakshi Kalyanam	Mukesh, Mohini	Jose Thomas	Nadirsha	
D E C	25	Dravidan	Vijayaraghavan, Jagathy Sreekumar, Rajan P Dev	Mohan Kupleri	S. P. Venkatesh	
		Aaghosham	Manoj K Jayan, Suvarna Mathew	T. S. Saji		
		Aalibabayum Aarara Kallanmarum	Vijayaraghavan, Jagadheesh, Jagathy Sreekumar		Berny Ignatius	
		Achaammakkuttiyude Achaayan	Rajan P Dev, Srividya, Jagadish	Rajan P Dev		
		Ayushman Bhava	Jayaram, Divya Unni, Innocent	Suresh Vinu		
		Chenapparambile Aanakkariyam	Sudheesh, Mukesh	Nissar		
		Chitrashalabham	Jayaram, Biju Menon, Jomol	K. B. Madhu		
		Daya	Manju Warrier, Krishna	Venu	Vishal Bhardwaj	
		Ennu Swantham Janakikutty	Jomol, Chanchal	Hariharan	Kaithapram	
		Graama Panchaayathu	Jagadish, Kaveri	Ali Akbar	Berni Ignatious	
		Harthaal	Vijayaraghavan, Vani Vishwanath			
		Ilamura Thamburan	Manoj K Jayan, Vani Viswanath		Raveendran	
		Kalapam	Manoj K. Jayan, Praveena	Baiju Kottarakkara		
		Kattathoru Penpoovu	Thilakan, Sangita, Murali	Mohan Kupleri		
		Magician Mahendralal from Delhi	Jagathy Sreekumar			
		Malabaril Ninnoru Manimaaran	Jagadish, Kalabhavan Mani			
		Manjukalavum Kazhinju	Manoj K. Jayan, Sukanya		Johnson	
		Manthrikumaran	Mukesh, Sangita	Thulasidas		
		Manthri Kochamma	Prem Kumar, Kanaka		Mohan Sithara	
		Mattupetti Machan	Mukesh, Sreelakshmi, Baiju, Maathu	Jose Thomas		
		Ormacheppu	Lal, Chanchal, Dileep	Lohithadas	Johnson	
		Poothiruvathira Ravil	Vijayaraghavan, Chippy			
		Samaantharangal	Balachandra Menon, Maathu	Balachandra Menon		
		Sooryaputhran	Jayaram, Divya Unni	Thulasidas	Ouseppachan	
		Sooryavanam	Shankar			
		Thakazhi		M. T. Vasudevan Nair	Raveendran	
		Thalolam	Murali, Suresh Gopi, Sreelakshmi	Jayaraj	Kaithapram	
		Thattakam	Kaithapram, Nedumudi Venu	Ramesh Das	Kaithapram	
		The Truth	Mammootty, Murali, Vani Vishwanath, Divya Unni	Shaji Kailas		
		Thirakalkkappuram	Suresh Gopi, Manju Warrier	Anil Adithyan		
		Kulirkaattu				
		Meenthoni				
		Aaraam Jaalakam				

== Dubbed films ==
Title	Director(s)	Original film		Cast	Ref.
Title	Director(s)	Film	Language	Cast	Ref.
Dravidam	Bhanu Chander				
