= Nazario =

Nazario may refer to

- Ronaldo Nazario (born 1976), Brazilian former footballer
- Nazario (given name)
- Nazario (surname)
- Nazário, a municipality in Brazil
- Nazario Collection, a cache of carved stones at Guayanilla, Puerto Rico
- San Nazario, Veneto, a town and comune in Italy
- Santi Nazario e Celso, Urgnano, a church in Lombardy, Italy
