= 1921 (disambiguation) =

1921 is a year.

1921 may also refer to:

- "1921" (song), a song by The Who on their 1969 album Tommy
- 1921 (1988 film), an Indian Malayalam-language historical film
- 1921 (2018 film), an Indian Hindi-language horror film, third part of the 1920 film series
- 1921 (2021 film), a Chinese film
- 1921: Puzha Muthal Puzha Vare, a 2022 Indian Malayalam-language historical drama film
