= Mamalakalkkappurathu =

Mamalaka
- Directed by: Ramasimhan
- Written by: Ramasimhan
- Starring: Manoj K. Jayan; Anil; Elias; Kilimol; Libu Philip
- Cinematography: M. J. Radhakrishnan
- Edited by: Venugopal
- Music by: Mohan Sithara
- Production company: Prathikarana Films
- Distributed by: Prathikarana Films
- Release date: 9 July 1988
- Country: India
- Language: Malayalam

Mamalakalkkappurathu (transl. Beyond the Mountains) is a 1988 Indian Malayalam-language drama film written and directed by Ramasimhan. The film stars Manoj K. Jayan, Anil, Elias and Kilimol in the lead roles. The film has musical score by Mohan Sithara. The film won the Kerala State Film Award for Best Debut Director.

== Cast ==
- Manoj K. Jayan
- Anil
- Elias
- Kilimol
- Manakkad Usha
- Master Hari
- Nazer
- Rathna Purushothaman
- Libu Philip
- Xavier
- Sheela

== Soundtrack ==
The music was composed by Mohan Sithara and the lyrics were written by Ali Akbar and T. C. John.

No.	Song	Singers	Lyrics	Length (m:ss)
1	"Nidra Veenudayum Raavil"	K. J. Yesudas, Sindhudevi	Ali Akbar	
2	"Uchalu Thira Malavan"	K. J. Yesudas, Sindhudevi	T. C. John	
3	"Vala Nalla Kuppivala" (Karinandu) (M)	K. J. Yesudas		
