= Salim Kumar =

Indian film actor, director and writer (1969–2026)

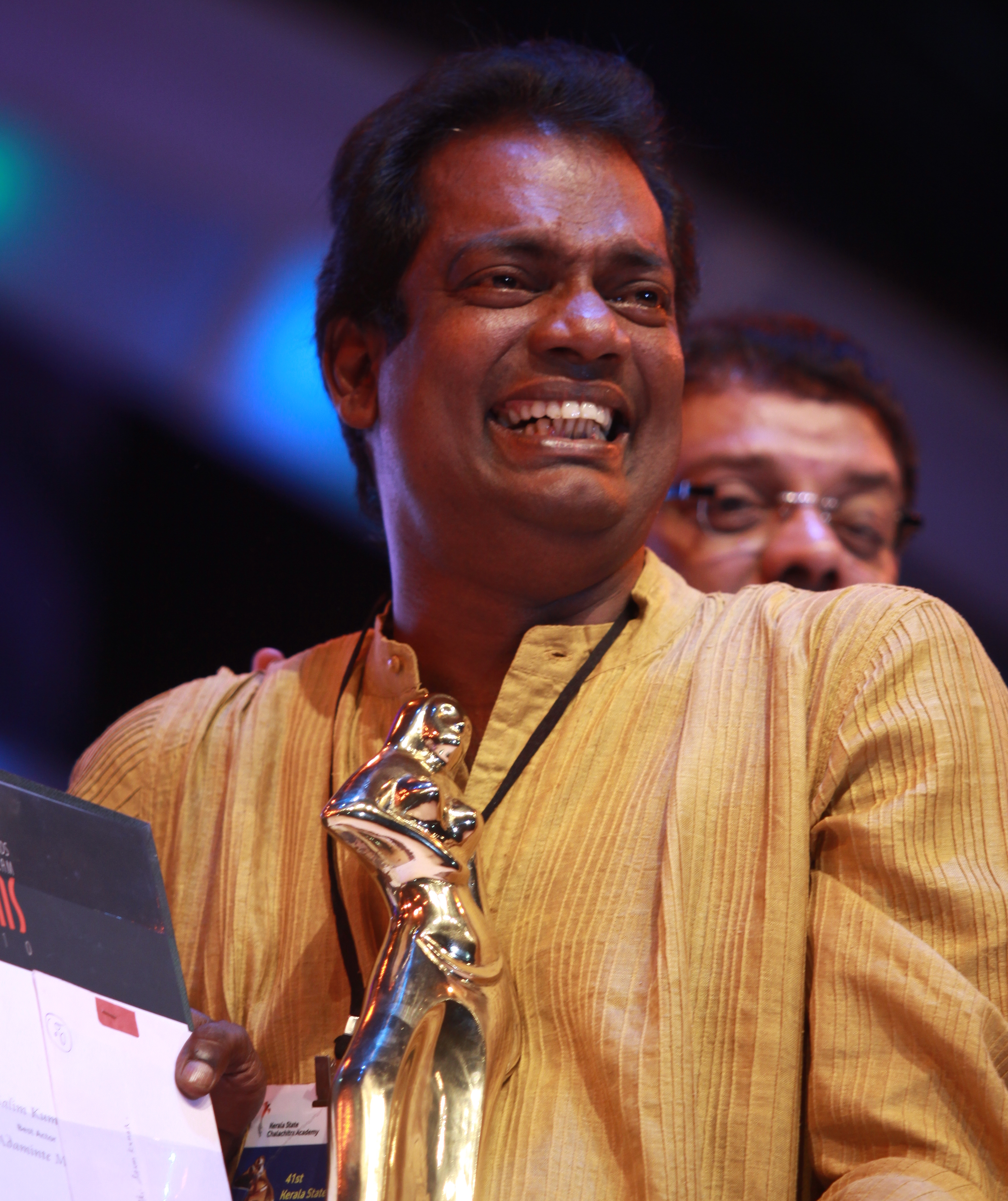
- Kumar receiving Kerala State Film Award in 2011
- Born: 10 October 1969; Chittatukara, North Paravur, Ernakulam, Kerala, India
- Died: 6 June 2026 (aged 56); Kochi, Ernakulam, Kerala, India
- Occupations: Actor; director; writer
- Years active: 1996–2026
- Spouse: Sunitha
- Children: 2, including Chandu Salim Kumar
- Awards: National Film Awards (2010); Kerala State Film Awards (2005, 2010, 2013, 2016); Filmfare Awards South (2011)

Salim Kumar (10 October 1969 – 6 June 2026) was an Indian actor, director and writer who worked predominantly in Malayalam cinema. Widely regarded as one of the most prominent and influential actors in the history of Malayalam cinema, he appeared in over 300 films across a career spanning three decades. He won the National Film Award for Best Actor in 2010 for his performance in Adaminte Makan Abu.

His directorial film Karutha Joothan won the 2017 Kerala State Film Award for Best Story. He also won the Kerala State Film Award for Second Best Actor for Achanurangatha Veedu (2005) and a Kerala State Television Award for Best Actor (2013).

== Early life and education ==
Salim Kumar was born as the youngest son of Gangadharan and Kausalya on 10 October 1969 in Chittattukara, North Paravur. His father, an atheist and a follower of the social reformer Sahodaran Ayyappan, named him Salim so that he would not be associated with any religion. The suffix "Kumar" was later added at the request of his school administration.

Kumar attended Government LPS, Chittattukara, and Government Boys High School, North Paravur, before pursuing his pre-degree at SNM College, Malyankara. Salim Kumar enrolled in a BA program at Maharajas College in Ernakulam because of his skill for imitation and a desire to work in the film industry and he won the Mahatma Gandhi University's Mimicry title thrice consecutively. He began his mimicry career at Cochin Kalabhavan before joining Cochin Sagar. He was also a performer on Asianet's comedy show Comicola. He also spent four years performing professional drama at Arathi Theatres in Kochi.

== Film career ==
Before entering the Malayalam film industry, Kumar was chosen as host for a comedy programme called Comicola broadcast on Asianet. He made his debut in Malayalam cinema with the 1997 family drama Ishtamanu Nooru Vattam, directed by Siddique Shameer. After doing some minor roles in numerous movies, Sibi Malayil offered Salim Kumar a role in his movie Nee Varuvolam. However he was sent back from the location by the production controller by saying that his acting was not right. He was later replaced by Indrans to do the role. He was later noted for his performance in the movie Satyameva Jayathe, which was released in 2000. After getting impressed with his performance in Satyameva Jayathe, director Rafi Meccartin offered Salim a role in his movie Thenkasipattanam, which was a major breakthrough in his film career. It was one of the highest grossing movies of 2000. In the movie One Man Show, he played the memorable role of a patient escaped from mental hospital. Salim Kumar then found success while acting along with Dileep. In some movies, the duo is joined by Harishree Ashokan. In the 2001 slapstick comedy movie Ee Parakkum Thalika, he played the role of cook Koshi while in the 2002 cult comedy movie Meesa Madhavan, he did the role of Advocate Mukundan Unni. He is also remembered for his performances alongside Cochin Haneefa in Mazhathullikkilukkam and Kunjikkoonan. In the movie Kalyanaraman, Salim Kumar played the role of Pyaari, which is considered one of the finest comedy performances in his career. He played one of the lead roles in the 2002 slapstick comedy film Bamboo Boys alongside Kalabhavan Mani, Cochin Haneefa and Harishree Ashokan.

Kumar probably played some of the most memorable comedy roles in his career in 2003. He played the character of a psychic mental patient in the classic cult movie C.I.D. Moosa. His role as Omanakkuttan in Thilakkam, Usman in Kilichundan Mampazham alongside Mohanlal and S. I. Gabbar Keshavan in Pattalam which starred Mammootty were memorable ones. It was in the romantic-comedy movie Pulival Kalyanam that Salim Kumar played the most memorable character in his career. Most of the critics acclaim this character called Manavalan as the best comedy character played by Salim Kumar. The many expressions of Manavalan, including his helpless face, his coy smile and act as a rich man smoking pipe later developed a cult following in Kerala troll community and are widely used in memes.

Alongside Jayasurya, Salim Kumar's other famous role is Dance Master Vikram in the movie Chathikkatha Chandu (2004). One of the other popular characters played by Salim Kumar came out in the 2007 Mammootty movie Mayavi (2007). His character called Kannan Srank/Ashan has been widely used in Malayalam memes.

His potential to do the character roles was revealed in 2004, after receiving critical acclaim for his role in the Kamal movie Perumazhakkalam. Though slightly comedic, the role was realistic, allowing him to display different acting skills. His role as the father in Achanurangatha Veedu (2005), directed by Lal Jose, was a major break in his acting career, when he was able to shrug off the usual idiot-fool-illiterate comedic roles for which he seemed destined. The role won him the Kerala State Film Awards for Second Best Actor. He was then declared the winner of the National Award for Best Actor for his performance in Adaminte Makan Abu in 2010.

Some of his other popular roles were Raajakkannu in Thommanum Makkalum, Umakandan in Pandippada, Chidhambaram in Hallo, Naranimangalam Narayanan in Romeo, Inspector Shyamalan in Annan Thampi and Maakri Gopalan in Chattambinaadu.

Kumar appeared in a hip-hop number in Vineeth Srinivasan's album "Coffee @ MG Road - Palavattam" (2008). It was an instant hit and developed a cult following.

He later ventured into direction, directing documentaries and feature-length dramas that were well received by critics. Karutha Joothan (2017), which is written and directed by Salim Kumar won the award for the Best Story at the 47th Kerala State Film Awards. His next directorial effort was Daivame Kaithozham K. Kumar Akanam (2018), starring Jayaram in the lead role.

== Personal life ==
Kumar lived in North Paravur, Ernakulam district, in a house called "Laughing Villa". He and his wife Sunitha have two sons, Chandu Salim Kumar and Aaromal. He was a member and staunch supporter of the Indian National Congress in Kerala. He wrote a memoir called Ishwara Vazhakkillello ("Oh God, I have no complaints") He conducted a mimicry troupe, Cochin Stallions, which introduced cine-serial actor Ramesh Pisharody and many other talents. His son Chandu is an actor who has appeared in films such as Manjummel Boys (2024).

=== Death ===
On 6 June 2026, Kumar was admitted to Amrita Hospital, Kochi due to physical difficulties in the morning, and was put on a ventilator after his condition deteriorated. He was pronounced dead the same night, at 10:43 PM IST. (Note: Kerala Kaumudi, Manorama Online, Mathrubhumi, Manorama News, Asianet News, Cinema Express) His funeral was held with official honours at his residence. In accordance with his wishes, the funeral was conducted without religious rites. Salim Kumar had reportedly instructed that no post-funeral rituals, including the immersion of ashes, be performed. After being draped in the flag of the Indian National Congress, his body was taken to the pyre. His sons, Chandu and Aromal, lit the funeral pyre. The ceremony was attended by Chief Minister V. D. Satheesan and All India Congress Committee General Secretary K. C. Venugopal, among other political and cultural figures and his colleagues and friends from the Malayalam film industry.

== Filmography ==
=== 1990s ===
Year	Title	Role	Notes
1991	Sandesham		Cameo (Uncredited Role)
1996	Ishtamanu Nooru Vattam	Radha Krishnan	
1997	Ishtadanam	Unnikuttan	
1997	Moonu Kodiyum Munnooru Pavanum	Mattanchery Mathen	
1997	Ancharakalyanam	Gireesan	
1997	Mannadiar Penninu Chenkotta Checkan	Kizhi	
1997	Adukkala Rahasyam Angaadi Paattu		
1997	Newspaper Boy	Venkiti	
1997	My Dear Kuttichathan	Guitarist in Bar	Reshot in 1997
1997	Suvarna Simhaasanam	Gopalan	
1997	Poothumbium Poovalanmarum		
1997	Guru Sishyan		
1998	Manthri Kochamma	Pankajakshan	
1998	Chenapparambile Aanakkariyam	Uthaman	
1998	Kudumba Vaarthakal	Kunjumon	
1998	Gramapanchayath	Bhaskaran	
1998	Mattupetti Machan	Manoharan	
1998	Meenakshi Kalyanam	Adv. Sivan Mullassery	
1998	Malabaril Ninnoru Manimaran	Stage Show	
1998	Mayajalam	Ezhupunna Mathai	
1998	Mangalya Pallakku	Phalgunan	
1998	Chenapparambile Aanakkariyam	Uthaman	
1998	Sooryavanam	Thamarathoppu	
1999	Auto Brothers		
1999	My Dear Karadi	Constable Ujwallan	
1999	Udayapuram Sulthan	Salim	
1999	Pattabhishekam	Illikkulam Kattumanakkal Ashtangahridayam Bhramadathan Moosad	
1999	Tokyo Nagarathile Viseshangal	Kadappuram Paarayi	

=== 2000s ===
Year	Title	Role	Notes
2000	Kinnara Thumbikal	Tea shop owner	
2000	Mera Naam Joker		
2000	Darling Darling	Telephone Booth Owner	
2000	Nadan Pennum Natupramaniyum	Showroom Manager	
2000	Vinayapoorvam Vidhyaadharan	Astrologer	
2000	Unnimaya		
2000	Melevaryathe Malakhakkuttikal	Bhaskaran	
2000	Sathyameva Jayathe	Mattancherry Mammathu	
2000	Thenkasipattanam	Muthuraman	
2001	Naranathu Thampuran	Shivan	
2001	Ee Parakkum Thalika	Koshy	
2001	Ee Nadu Innale Vare		
2001	Sundara Purushan	Balan	
2001	One Man Show	Bhaskaran	
2001	Nariman	Kochu Narayanan's Manager	
2001	Bharthavudyogam	Pushpan	
2001	Soothradharan	Leela Krishnan	
2002	Kakki Nakshatram		
2002	Valkannadi	Raghavan	
2002	Meesa Madhavan	Advocate Mukundanunni	
2002	Thandavam	Basheer	
2002	Pranayamanithooval	Sundaran	
2002	Punyam		
2002	Mazhathullikkilukkam	Maayandi	
2002	Kashillatheyum Jeevikkam		
2002	Kunjikoonan	Chandran	
2002	Bamboo Boys	Chamba	
2002	Kalyanaraman	Pyari	
2002	Vasanthamalika	Komalan	
2002	Savithriyude Aranjanam	Olympian Bhootham Appachan	
2003	Pattanathil Sundaran	Adv. Bhuvanachandran	
2003	Vellithira	Surendran	
2003	Gramophone	'Tabla' Bhaskaran	
2003	C.I.D. Moosa	Mental Patient	
2003	Thilakkam	Omanakkuttan	
2003	Kilichundan Mampazham	Usman	
2003	Pattalam	S.I. Gabbar Keshavan	
2003	Swantham Malavika		
2003	Pulival Kalyanam	Manavalan	
2003	Hariharan Pillai Happy Aanu	Sundaran	
2003	The Fire		
2003	Ente Veedu Appuvinteyum	Ganeshan	
2003	Malsaram	Vaira Muthu	
2004	Youth Festival	Veerapandi	
2004	Rasikan	Paramu	
2004	Chathikkatha Chandu	Dance Master Vikram	
2005	Pandippada	Umakandan	
2005	Thommanum Makkalum	Raajakkannu	
2005	Thaskaraveeran	Sugathan	
2005	Sarkar Dada	Kumaran	
2005	Maanikyan	Kumaran	
2005	Krithyam	Badsha	
2005	Izha		
2005	Kalyana Kurimanam		
2005	Rappakal	Govindan	
2005	Naran	Idimutt Rajappan	
2005	Junior Senior	Sathyan	
2005	Aandavan	Mayinkutti	
2005	Rajamanikyam	Dasappan	
2005	Udayananu Tharam	Rafeek	
2006	Chanthupottu	Vareed	
2006	Oruvan	Balan	
2006	Aanachandam	Aana paappan Manikandan	
2006	Narakasuran	CBI Officer Govind	
2006	Vrindavanam		
2006	Lion	Pottakuzhy Chellappan	
2006	Thuruppu Gulan	Khadar&Khadar	
2006	Eakantham	Velayudhan	
2006	Pulijanmam		
2006	Achanurangatha Veedu	Samuel/Prabhakaran	
2006	Pachakuthira	Chandran	
2006	Prajapathi	Film Star Abhilash	
2006	Chess	Unnikkannan	
2006	Vaasthavam	Thrippan Namboothiri	
2006	Karutha Pakshikal		
2007	Changathipoocha	Rajappan	
2007	Inspector Garud	Chakkachamparambil Lonappan	
2007	Mayavi	Kannan Srank	
2007	Hareendran Oru Nishkalankan	Rajendran Vazhayila	
2007	Romeo	Naranimangalam Narayanan	
2007	Ayur Rekha	P.C. Ismail	
2007	Kangaroo	'Current' Kunjachan	
2007	Anamika		
2007	Mission 90 Days	Aravindan	
2007	The Speed Track	Lali	
2007	Abraham & Lincoln	Constable Marcos	
2007	Nagaram	Lalkuzhi Nanappan	
2007	Eakantham	Velayudhan	
2007	Goal (2007 Malayalam film)	Kuriakose	
2007	July 4	Sakthivel	
2007	Hallo	Chidambaram	
2007	Arabikatha	Kareem	
2007	Chocolate	Pappan	
2007	Kadha Parayumbol	Poet Das Vadakkemuri	
2007	Flash		
2008	Twenty:20	Induchoodan IPS	
2008	De Ingottu Nokkiye		
2008	Jubilee		
2008	Shakespeare M.A. Malayalam	Sugunan Muthukunnam	
2008	Cycle	Stephen	
2008	Thavalam	Sundaran	
2008	Parthan Kanda Paralokam	Karunan	
2008	Gopalapuranam	Ramanan	
2008	Mulla	'Thotti' Sasi	
2008	One Way Ticket	Sakkath Beeran	
2008	Annan Thampi	Inspector Shyamalan	
2008	Mayabazar	Govindan Ashari	
2008	Sultan	Sundaran	
2008	Crazy Gopalan	Lakshmanan	
2008	Lollypop	Priest / Advocate Kuriakose	
2009	Sanmanassullavan Appukuttan		
2009	Samastha Keralam PO	Subrahmaniam	
2009	Aayirathil Oruvan	Usman	
2009	Loudspeaker	KP	
2009	Samayam		
2009	Malayali	Mohanakrishnan	
2009	Duplicate	Professional killer 1	
2009	Love In Singapore	Shukkur khan	
2009	2 Harihar Nagar	Ayyappan	
2009	Ee Pattanathil Bhootham	SI Madhavan Chandrappinni / Parakkum Madhavan	
2009	Makante Achan	Krishnan Kutty	
2009	Decent Parties	Rafeeq	
2009	Swantham Lekhakan	Chandramohan	
2009	Kappal Muthalaali	Omanakuttan	
2009	Angel John	Rajan	
2009	Gulumal-The Escape	Bhai	
2009	Kerala Cafe	Manikandan	
2009	Chattambinadu	Maakri Gopalan	

=== 2010s ===
Year	Title	Role	Notes
2010	Senior Mandrake		
2010	Nizhal		
2010	Cheriya Kallanum Valiya Policeum	Gopalan	
2010	Pokkiri Raja	Novelist Manoharan Mangalodayam	
2010	3 Char Sau Bees	Chandran Muthalali	
2010	Anwar	Ashraf	
2010	Swantham Bharya Zindabad	T K Vipin kumar	
2010	My Big Father	Unnikuttan	
2010	Four Friends	Kochouseph	
2010	Malarvaadi Arts Club	Kattapparam Sasi	
2010	Thaskara Lahala	Ayyappan	
2010	Oridathoru Postman	Chandrappan	
2010	Kaaryasthan	Kalidas	
2010	Best Actor	Vadival Pranchi	
2010	Aakashayathra		
2010	Marykkundoru Kunjaadu	Lonappan	
2011	Adaminte Makan Abu	Abu	
2011	Doubles	Mayyazhi	
2011	Arjunan Saakshi	Mechanic Jackson	
2011	Makeup Man	Lawrence	
2011	Christian Brothers	Purushothaman	
2011	Manikyakkallu	Kunjuraman/Thampuraan	
2011	Janapriyan	Kannappan kannapi	
2011	Teja Bhai & Family	Divakaran Nair	
2012	916		
2012	Players		
2012	Padmasree Bharat Dr. Saroj Kumar	Rafeek	
2012	Masters	Monichan	
2012	Annum Innum Ennum	Lopez	
2012	Cobra	Gopalan	
2012	Ordinary	Ashan - Bus mechanic	
2012	Vaadhyar		
2012	Prabhuvinte Makkal		
2012	Ezham Suryan		
2012	Mr. Marumakan	Sankaranunni	
2012	Mazhavillinattam Vare	The Cook	
2012	Ayalum Njanum Thammil	Thomachan	
2012	101 Weddings	Khader	
2013	Abhiyum Njanum	Jose	
2013	Pigman		
2013	Lisammayude Veedu	Samuel/Prabhakaran	
2013	Immanuel	Suku	
2013	Oonga	Kunja/Tramp	Oriya-Hindi bilingual film; released in film festivals
2013	Maryan	Thomayya	Tamil film
2013	Moonam Nal Nyararcha		
2013	Kunjananthante Kada		
2013	Nadodimannan	Ravi	
2013	KQ		
2013	Bicycle Thieves	Bose Prakash/Bossettan	
2014	Nedunchaalai	Mattu Sekar	Tamil film
2014	My Dear Mummy		
2014	Bhaiyya Bhaiyya	Korah	
2014	Seconds	Jeevan	
2015	Compartment		
2015	Fireman	Narendan Achari	
2015	Valiya Chirakulla Pakshikal	School Head Master	
2015	Elanjikkavu P.O		
2015	Female Unnikrishnan	Thamarakulam Raviyan	
2015	Pathemari	Narayanan's Father	
2016	Thoppil Joppan	Fr. Issac Vaalamparambil	
2016	Moonam Naal Njyayarazhcha	Karumpan	
2016	Kattappanayile Hrithik Roshan	Naxalite Chandran	
2017	Ramaleela	Sumesh Venjara	
2017	Karutha Sooryan		
2017	Hello Dubaikkaran		
2017	Sherlock Toms	Chouro Aashan	
2017	Karutha Joothan		
2017	Velipadinte Pusthakam	Prof. Premraj Idikkattutharayi	
2017	Clint		
2017	Chippy		
2018	Mangalyam Thanthunanena		
2018	Chalakkudikkaran Changathi		
2018	Mohanlal	Sathan Jose	
2018	Panchavarnathatha	Adv. Jimmy	
2018	Kuttanadan Marpappa	Philipose	
2018	Daivame Kaithozham K. Kumar Akanam	Karimannur Gopi	
2018	Shikkari Shambhu	SI Jimmy	
2018	Queen	Adv. Mukundan	
2018	Sakhavinte Priyasakhi		
2019	Driving License	Agasthi	
2019	Varky		
2019	Ulta	Pattelar Dopanna	
2019	Munthiri Monchan: Oru Thavala Paranja Kadha	Thavala	
2019	Edakkad Battalion 06	Santhosh	
2019	Ganagandharvan	Rajaji	
2019	Ittymaani: Made in China	Mapranam Varkey	
2019	A For Apple	Muhammed	
2019	Shibu	Dr.Thomachan	
2019	Rangeela		
2019	Mask	Cheguevara alias Jaggu Varapuzha	
2019	Thamara		
2019	Oru Yamandan Premakadha	Paanchi	
2019	Madhura Raja	Manoharan Manyolodayam	
2019	An International Local Story	MLA Joseph Manavalan	
2019	Oru Adaar Love	Manavalan	
2019	Allu Ramendran	SI Sinto Simon	

=== 2020s ===
Year	Title	Role	Notes
2020	Dhamaka	Doctor	
2021	Meow	Usthad	
2021	Malik	Moosakka	
2021	Sumesh and Ramesh	Indukaladharan	
2021	One	Dassappan	
2021	Keshu Ee Veedinte Nadhan		Narration
2022	Pada	Justice Thankappan Achari	
2022	Thallumaala	Singer	Cameo appearance
2022	Mei Hoom Moosa	Adv. Manoharan	
2023	Vellari Pattanam	Kunjikannan Mash	
2023	Kallanum Bhagavathiyum		
2023	Kenkemam		
2023	Kirkkan	Kirkkan	
2024	Badal		
2024	Malayalee From India	Hamsa	
2024	Marivillin Gopurangal		
2024	Kudumbasthreeyum Kunjadum		
2024	Pattapakal		
2024	Idiyan Chandhu	Balan	
2024	Panchayath Jetty	Radha Ramanan	
2025	Bha Bha Ba	Advocate Mukundanunni	Cameo appearance
2026	Koodothram		
2026	Khalifa		
2026	Avaranchan & Sons'		
2026	Tiki Taka		
2026	Ottakomban		

== As director ==
Year	Film	Notes
2015	Compartment	
2017	Karutha Joothan	
2018	Daivame Kaithozham K. Kumar Akanam	

== As dubbing artist ==
- Ohm Shanthi Oshaana - Narrator
- Utopiayile Rajavu - Voice for Kakka (Voice For Crow)
- Alamara - Voice for Alamara (Voice For Wooden Wardrobe)
- Keshu Ee Veedinte Nadhan - narrator
- Mukundan Unni Associates - Voice for Mukundan's grandfather

== Television ==
Year	Title	Role	Channel	Notes
2015	Cinema Chirima	himself	Mazhavil Manorama	
2016	Komedy Circus	Judge	Mazhavil Manorama	
2017–2019	Comedy stars season 2	Recurring Judge	Asianet	
2017	Comedy Utsavam	Himself	Flowers TV	
2018	Urvashi Theatre	Mentor	Asianet	
2018-2019	Thakarppan Comedy	Mentor	Mazhavil Manorama	
2020	John Jaffer Janardhanan	Narrator	Surya TV	
2020–2022	Comedy Masters	Judge	Amrita TV	
2021–2022	Star Magic	Mentor	Flowers TV	
2024	Chiri Kadhakal	Host	Kaumudy TV	

== Awards and nominations ==
Award	Year	Category	Film	Result
National Film Awards	2010	Best Actor	Adaminte Makan Abu	Won
Kerala State Film Awards	2005	Second Best Actor	Achanurangatha Veedu	Won
Kerala State Film Awards	2010	Best Actor	Adaminte Makan Abu	Won
Kerala State Film Awards	2013	Best Comedian	Ayalum Njanum Thammil	Won
Kerala State Film Awards	2016	Best Story	Karutha Joothan	Won
Kerala State Television Awards	2013	Best Actor	Parethante Paribhavangal	Won
Filmfare Awards South	2011	Best Actor (Malayalam)	Adaminte Makan Abu	Won
South Indian International Movie Awards	2012	Special Jury Award	Adaminte Makan Abu	Won
Kerala Film Critics Association Award	2010	Special Jury Award	Adaminte Makan Abu	Won
Asianet Film Awards	2008	Best Comedy Actor	Annan Thambi	Won
Asianet Film Awards	2011	Special Jury Award	Adaminte Makan Abu	Won
Vanitha Film Awards	2011	Best Comedian	Marykkundoru Kunjaadu	Won

=== Other awards ===
- 2005: Sathyan Award - Achanurangatha Veedu
- 2005: Bharathan Award - Achanurangatha Veedu
- 2010: Jaihind TV Film Award for Best Actor - Adaminte Makan Abu
- 2010: Amrita-FEFKA Film Award's Special Jury Award - Adaminte Makan Abu
- 2011: Prem Nazir Award
- 2012: Best Actor for Adaminte Makan Abu at Imagine India International Film Festival
