= Ponnuchami =

- Directed by: Ramasimhan
- Written by: A. R. Mukesh
- Produced by: P. K. Anand
- Starring: Suresh Gopi; Chithra (actress)
- Cinematography: A. Lalu
- Edited by: G. Murali
- Music by: Mohan Sithara
- Distributed by: Arakkal Release
- Release date: 1993
- Country: India
- Language: Malayalam

Ponnuchami is a 1993 Indian Malayalam-language drama film directed by Ali Akbar and written by A. R. Mukesh, starring Suresh Gopi and Chithra.

== Plot ==
Ponnuchami, a farrier, is assisted by Rajappan, an apprentice he adopted from the streets who is deaf and dumb. In the meantime, he marries a woman and has a child who is not walking despite many treatments. An astrologer tells him that it's because of a curse that his child is not walking on two legs. He then sees a doctor who tells him that it is curable. While returning from hospital, he sees his wife being raped by Rajappan who was under the influence of alcohol. Upon seeing this, he beats Rajappan up and decides to leave his wife and take the child with him. The day after, he learns that Rajappan has committed suicide out of guilt.

Years later, he comes back to his home with his child now cured and able to walk. However, with his wife, he sees the child she had with his apprentice who is also deaf and dumb. He embraces them all and accepts life's fate.

== Cast ==
- Suresh Gopi as Ponnuchammi
- Ashokan as Rajappan
- Vinodini as Maya
- Chithra as Kanakam
- Thodupuzha Vasanthi as Narayani
- Indrans as Velappan
- Mansoor Ali Khan as Ratnam
- Lalitha Sree as Mallika
- Kalpana as Vally
- Sainuddin as Aravindakshan
- Adoor Bhavani as Pathamavathi
- Jose Pellissery

== Soundtrack ==
Ponnuchami

Soundtrack album by Mohan Sithara
- Released: 1993
- Length: 24:34
- Language: Malayalam
- Label: Nisari Audios

Mohan Sithara chronology
Porutham (1993)	Ponnuchami (1993)	Vakkeel Vasudev (1993)

The songs of this movie were composed by Mohan Sithara and penned by O.N.V Kurup.

No.	Title	Artist(s)	Length
1.	"Chaapam Kulakkunnu"	M.G. Sreekumar	5:00
2.	"Kunjurangum Koottinullil (Female Version)"	K.S. Chithra	5:07
3.	"Kunjurangum Koottinullil (Male Version)"	M.G. Sreekumar	5:07
4.	"Neeyen Ulppoovinnullil"	K.S. Chithra	4:11
5.	"Ore Yaathra"	M.G. Sreekumar	5:09
Total length:			24:34
