= Junior Mandrake =

- Directed by: Ramasimhan aka Ali Akbar
- Screenplay by: Benny P. Nayarambalam
- Story by: Arun Kudamaloor
- Produced by: Mummy Century; Shameer Thukalil
- Starring: Jagadish; Jagathy Sreekumar; Rajan P. Dev; Janardhanan
- Cinematography: O. Lalu
- Edited by: G. Murali
- Music by: Berny-Ignatius
- Production companies: M & S Productions
- Distributed by: Kokers Films; Anupama Release; Evershine Release
- Release date: 1 October 1997
- Country: India
- Language: Malayalam

Junior Mandrake is a 1997 Indian Malayalam-language fantasy comedy film directed by Ramasimhan aka Ali Akbar and written by Benny P. Nayarambalam from a story by Arun Kudamaloor. The plot revolves around the carriers of a mysterious bust named Junior Mandrake, which is believed to bring misfortune to those who possess it. The film stars Jagadish, Jagathy Sreekumar, Rajan P. Dev and Janardhanan. The music was provided by the Berny-Ignatius duo. The film was a major commercial success at the box office. The bust used in the movie eventually became a mainstay in Malayali Pop culture and the word "junior mandrake" has become synonymous with misfortune . In 2010, a sequel titled Senior Mandrake was released.

== Plot ==
Nambiar is a building contractor and a staunch atheist, who even named his company Nireeswara Constructions. However, he is plagued by many problems in his contracting business, particularly due to the conspiracies plotted by his competitor, Shankara Pillai. Compelled by his wife Sudharma, who is devoted to God, and his sons, Pradeep and Sandeep, Nambiar consents to consult an astrologer Thanku Panicker to find if there is any supernatural cause behind their problems. Panicker ascertains that there is an evil spirit residing in the bust of Junior Mandrake kept in their house.

Actually, Nambiar had been entrusted to handover this bust to someone in the airport when he returned from Singapore, but no one showed up to receive it. Panicker prescribes the evil spirit can be got rid of only by presenting the bust to someone who may receive it "with pleasure", who in turn will be taken over by the evil spirit. Nambiar manages to present this bust to his adversary, Pillai, on his birthday party. Panicker is apparently proven right as the misfortune of Nambiar is now shifted to Pillai, starting with coconut falling on Pillai's new car, breaking its window, and also turning Nambiar into an ardent believer in God in the process.

Pillai soon learns about this and tries to get rid of the bust by several ways and finally manages to gift it to "Patti" Menon, the father-in-law of Nambiar. The bust makes various journeys back and forth, finally ending up with Omanakuttan, driver of Menon. Omanakuttan accidentally discovers that there is a bundle of precious stones hidden inside the bust. He takes some stones with him, and keeps the rest over the roof of his rented house.

By the time he came back as a wealthy man, the house had been rented out by the owner as a police station. Omanakuttan tries to retrieve the remaining treasure from the roof by various means, several of these failed attempts prompts the police to believe that Omanakuttan is insane, he is forcefully confined in a mental hospital. During his time at the hospital, there is a series of jokers. At the same time, the actual owner of the bust, Junior Mandrake, a crime boss in whose shape the bust was made, who was so far in jail in Singapore, is now out searching for it.

Mandrake tracks down all those involved with the bust—Pillai, Nambiar, Pradeep, Sandeep, Menon, and Omanakuttan. He plants a bomb on a moving school van as a decoy to keep the police station with less cops, but Pradeep manages to detach the bomb and saves the children. Mandrake ends up in police custody in his attempt to recover the treasure from the police station, and the treasure goes to the government. The story ends with Pradeep joined with the daughter of Pillai with whom he was in love.

== Cast ==
- Jagadish as Pradeep Nambiar
- Jagathy Sreekumar as driver Omanakuttan
- Rajan P. Dev as Nambiar, Pradeep's father
- Janardhanan as Shankaran Pillai / Pillaichan
- Kalabhavan Navas as Sandeep Nambiar, Pradeep's younger brother
- Sidharaj as Junior Mandrake
- Keerthi Gopinath as Priya, Pillai's Daughter and Pradeep's love interest
- Reena as Sudharma, Pradeep's mother
- Paravoor Bharathan as 'Patti' Menon, Sudharma's father
- M. S. Thripunithura as Thanku Panicker
- Cochin Haneefa as CI Sadasivan
- Mala Aravindan as Maniyan Vaidhyan
- Indrans as Driver Gopalan
- Mamukkoya as Constable Abu
- Kalpana as Vandana, Omanakuttan's wife
- Kalabhavan Rahman as Vakkachan
- Zeenath as Vishalakshi / Vishalam, Priya's mother
- Sreeni Njarakkal as Sadasivan, Nambiar's manager
- Sagar Shiyas as mental patient

== Production ==
Some of the scenes were improvised while filming, particularly that of Jagathy Sreekumar's.

== Soundtrack ==
Junior Mandrake

Soundtrack album by Berny Ignatius
- Released: 1 October 1997
- Recorded: 1997
- Genre: Feature film soundtrack
- Length: 13:43
- Language: Malayalam
- Label: Wilson Audios
- Producer: Berny Ignatius

Berny Ignatius chronology
Bharatheeyam (1997)	Junior Mandrake (1997)	Gajaraja Manthram (1997)

The film consists of three songs composed by the Berny–Ignatius duo, penned by O. N. V. Kurup and Ali Akbar. The original background score was also done by them. In the film, the character of Pradeep Nambiar (Jagadish) is a folk musician. So, the song "Ellarum Pokumcho" is written in the style of folk music.

Track listing
No.	Title	Lyrics	Singer(s)	Length
1.	"Ellarum Pokumcho"	O. N. V. Kurup	K. S. Chithra, K. G. Markose	4:32
2.	"Konnamalar"	O. N. V. Kurup	K. J. Yesudas	4:26
3.	"Sopanam Thammil"	O. N. V. Kurup	Biju Narayanan	4:45
Total length:				13:43

== Sequel ==
In 2010, a sequel titled Senior Mandrake was released, directed by Ali Akbar himself.
