= Chemmanam Chacko =

Indian satirical poet

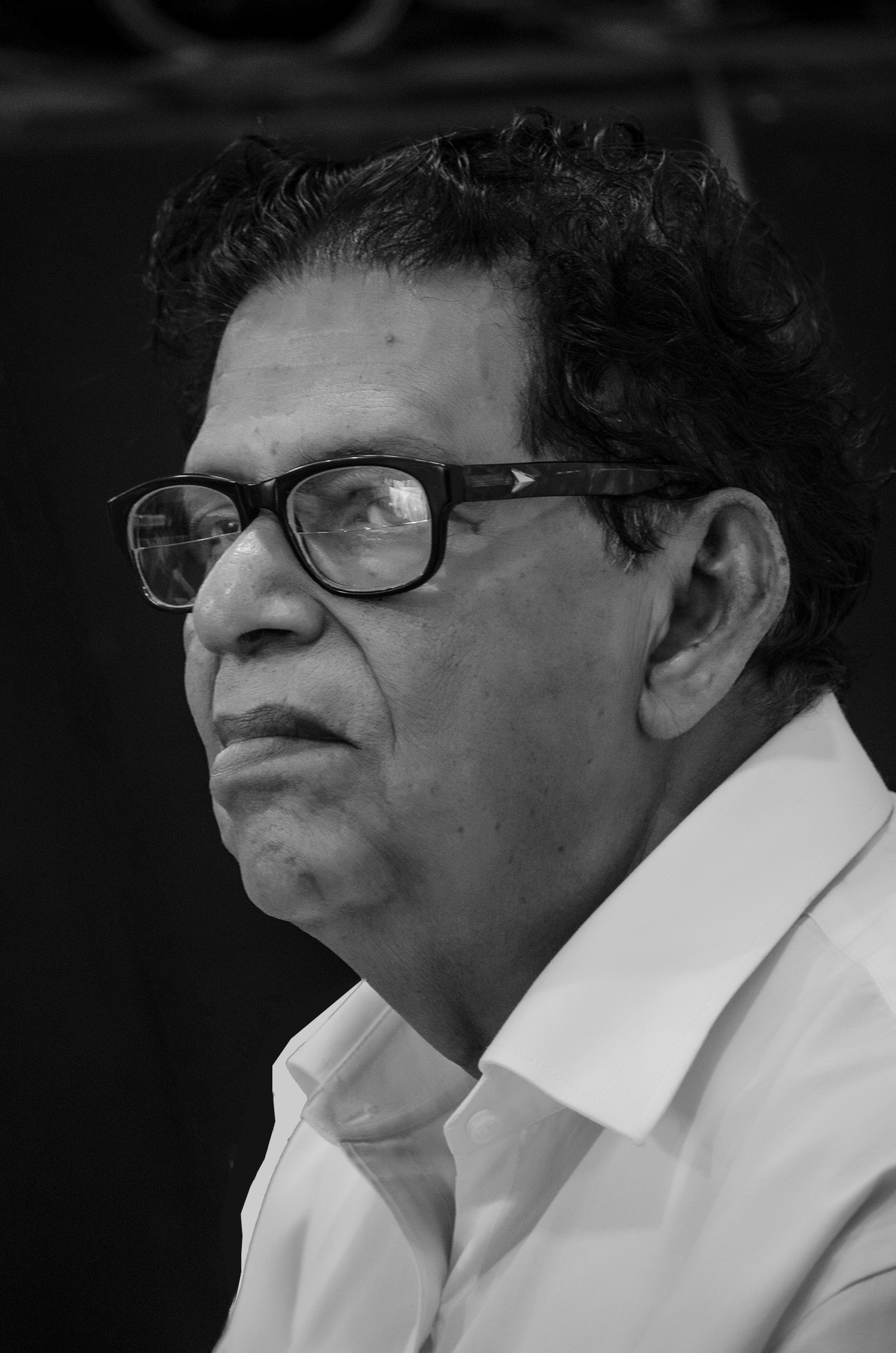
- Born: 7 March 1926; Mulakulam, Travancore
- Died: 14 August 2018 (aged 92); Kochi, Kerala, India
- Occupations: Poet, social worker
- Writing career
- Pen name: Chemmanam

Chemmanam Chacko (7 March 1926 – 14 August 2018) was an Indian satirical poet from Kerala, India. He died on 15 August 2018 at the age of 92 at his residence in Padamugal.

== Early life ==
Chacko was born on 7 March 1926, in the village of Mulakulam in erstwhile Travancore. Chemmanam is his family name. His father was an Orthodox Christian priest. He did his early schooling in Saint Joseph's school, Piravom, and went on to receive his BA honours in Malayalam literature with first rank from University College, Trivandrum. He worked as a professor at Mar Ivanios College and the Department of Malayalam, University of Kerala.

== Poetry ==
Chacko's first published poem was 'Munnottu' (Forward) which appeared in a local weekly in 1946. The poem 'Kanakaaksharangal' published in 1967 brought him popularity. Chemmanam is famed for efficiently utilising satire in his poems as a means of social and political critique. His poetic style has often drawn comparison to the early Malayalam language poet Kunjan Nambiar. His 1977 poetry collection Rajapatha won the Kerala Sahitya Akademi Award. He was conferred with the lifetime achievement award for literature by the Kerala Sahitya Akademi in 2006. He received the Mahakavi Pandalam Keralavarma Award for Poetry in 2014 and Asan Prize in 2015.

=== List of poems ===
- Vilamparam (Proclamation) (1947)
- Kanakaaksharangal (Golden Letters) (1967)
- Nellu (Rice) (1968)
- Innu (Today) (1969)
- Puthari (Fresh Rice) (1970)
- Asthram (Arrow) (1971)
- Agneyaasthram (Fire-arrow) (1972)
- Dukkhanthinte Chiri (Laughter of sorrow) (1973)
- Aavanazhi (Quiver) (1974)
- Jaithrayaathra (Victory Parade) (1975)
- Rajapaatha (Royal Path) (1976)
- Daahajalam (Water for Thirst) (1981)
- Bhoomikulukkam (Earthquake) (1983)
- Ampum Villum (Bow and Arrow) (1986)
- Raajavinu Vasthramilla (King is naked) (1989)
- Aalilla Kaserakal (Empty Chairs) (1991)
- Chinteru (Plane - as in tool for timber work) (1995)
- Narma Sankadam (Light Sadness) (1997)
- Onnu Onnu Randaayiram (1–1–2000) (2000)
- Ottayaal Pattaalam (One-man Army) (2003)
- Ottayaante Choonduviral (Pointing finger of a lone Elephant) (2007)
- Akshara Poraattam (War of Words) (2009)
- Akshara Poraali (Warrior of words) (2010)
