= Kalamasseriyil Kalyanayogam =

- Directed by: Balu Kiriyath
- Screenplay by: Kaloor Dennis
- Produced by: Puthezhathu Ravi
- Starring: Mukesh; Charmila; Premkumar; Narendra Prasad; Janardhanan; Rajan P Dev; Indrans; Rizabawa; Sreedhar Paliyath
- Cinematography: Sree Shankar
- Edited by: G. Murali
- Music by: Tomin J Thachangary; S. P. Venkitesh (background score)
- Production company: Radha Film Arts
- Distributed by: AKB Release; Amritha Release
- Release date: 1995
- Country: India
- Language: Malayalam

Kalamasseriyil Kalyanayogam (lit. "The marriage alignment in Kalamassery) is a 1995 Indian Malayalam film, directed by Balu Kiriyath, starring Mukesh and Charmila in the lead roles.

== Cast ==
- Mukesh as Balachandran
- Charmila as Ashwathy Nair
- Premkumar as Prakashan
- Narendra Prasad as Kodalipparampil Sankara Menon
- Janardanan as Kalamassery Krishnan Nair
- Indrans as Palarivattom Philippose
- Kalpana as Chembakassery Shakuntala
- Rajan P Dev as Edappally Raman Nair
- Rizabawa as Edappally Anantharaman
- Kanakalatha as Soudamini
- K. R. Vatsala as Ambika
- Zainuddin as Gundu Vasu
- Sreedhar Paliyath as Vasudevan
- Satheesh as Chembakassery Chandrappan
- KTS Padannayil
- Kalabhavan Navas as Navas
- Kalabhavan Haneef
- B.Harikumar as Senior Gunda and Shakuntala's brother
- Shaju
- Nikhil
- Bindu Varapuzha as Mariyamma
- Usha T.T. as Hostel warden Annakutty
- Ragini as Mrs Thara Umesh
- Rani Larius as Balachandran's sister
