= Kalabhavan =

Art school in Kochi, India

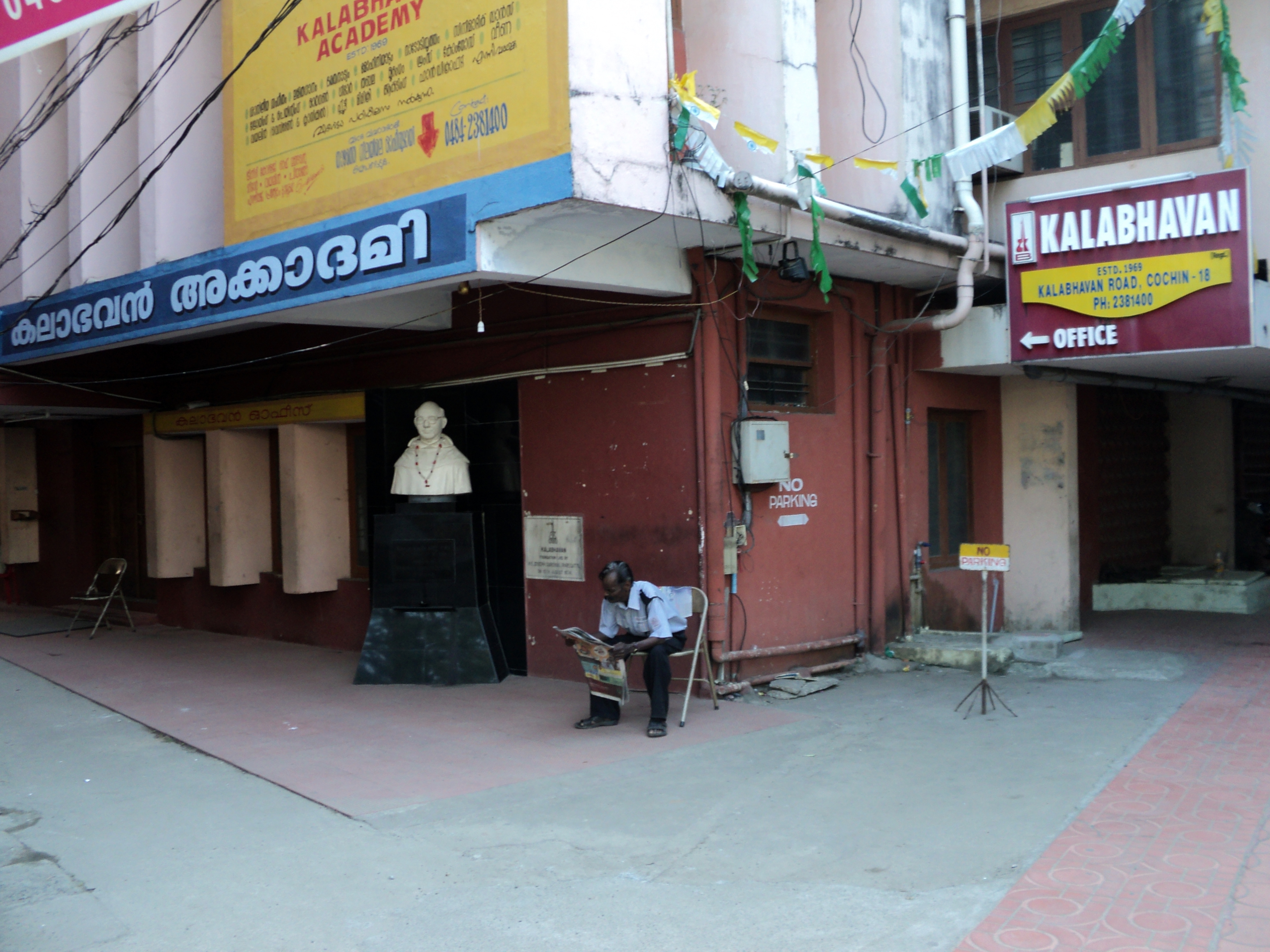
- Formation: 3 September 1969; 57 years ago
- Founder: Fr. Abel
- Headquarters: Kalabhavan Road, Kochi, Kerala, India
- Website: kalabhavan.org

Kalabhavan (lit. "The House of Arts"), also known as Cochin Kalabhavan, is a centre for learning the performing arts in Kochi, India. Kalabhavan is notable for being the first organised performing mimicry group in Kerala and which popularised the art of mimicry in the state of Kerala. Ever since its founding, Kalabhavan has served as a grooming centre for acting aspirants. As a result, Kalabhavan has contributed numerous actors and film directors to Malayalam cinema.

== History ==
Founded on 3 September 1969, by C.M.I. priest Fr. Abel, with the help of K. K. Antony, a music teacher, and K. J. Yesudas, then a budding playback singer, started Kalabhavan as the Christian Arts Club to promote Christian music. Kalabhavan received the patronage of Cardinal Joseph Parecattil, the Archbishop of Ernakulam. It was K. J. Yesudas, who suggested renaming the institution as 'Kalabhavan'. Kalabhavan initially took up the production of Christian religious songs. Later they moved on to Ganamela (Concerts for film songs). Mimicry performances of individual artists were used as 'fillers' between stage programs. Later, mimicry was organised as a team event to form the now popular Mimics Parade.

The professional mimicry troupe of Kalabhavan began with a team of six members consisting of Siddique, Lal, Anzar, K. S. Prasad, Varkkichan, and Rahman. It was this team that developed Mimics Parade in its present form. Harisree is another notable mimics troupe in Kerala.

In 2015, Kalabhavan opened its UAE centre at Sharjah.

== Notable alumni ==
(In chronological order)

- Siddique, director
- Lal, actor and director
- Zainuddin
- Jayaram, actor
- Kalabhavan Rahman
- Harisree Ashokan, actor
- Dileep, actor
- Nadirshah
- Kalabhavan Abi
- N. F. Varghese
- Kalabhavan Mani, actor
- Salim Kumar
- Kalabhavan Shajohn
- Narayanankutty
- Fayiz Muhammed, violinist and composer
- Thesni Khan
- Hakim Rawther
- Bindu Panicker, actress
- Machan Varghese
- Sujatha Mohan, playback singer
- Kalabhavan Navas
- Rafi of Rafi Mecartin duo
- Mecartin of Rafi Mecartin duo
- Berny of Berny-Ignatius duo
- Kalabhavan Haneef
