= Senior Mandrake =

- Directed by: Ali Akbar
- Screenplay by: Ali Akbar
- Story by: Ali Akbar
- Produced by: Mummy Century; Shameer Thukalil
- Starring: Jagadeesh; Jagathy Sreekumar; Kalpana
- Cinematography: Raju V. Krishna
- Edited by: Ali Akbar
- Music by: Hari Venu Gopal
- Release date: 29 January 2010
- Running time: 151 min
- Country: India
- Language: Malayalam

Senior Mandrake is a 2010 Indian Malayalam-language fantasy comedy-drama film directed by Ali Akbar. It is a sequel to the 1997 film Junior Mandrake. Jagathy Sreekumar, Jagadish and Kalpana plays the lead roles. The film was a box-office bomb.

== Plot ==
Kuttan has become enviably rich, and has disposed of the ill-fated statue, but soon it finds its way back to the money lender's doorstep. Without any further delay, the world starts crumbling around him, and he frantically scurries around to hand it over to some unfortunate soul.

== Cast ==
- Jagathy Sreekumar as Omanakuttan
- Kalpana as Vandana
- Jagadish as Pradeep
- Kalabhavan Navas as Sandeep
- Suraj Venjaramood as S.I. kidukkan
- Mamukkoya
- Salim Kumar
- Bijukuttan
- Kochu Preman
- Bindu Panicker
- Indrans as Gopalan
- Sidharaj as Senior Mandrake
- Mala Aravindan as Maniyan Vaidyan
- Kanakalatha
- Appa Haja
- Jaffar Idukki

== Reception ==
The film received highly negative reviews criticizing direction, art direction, location, camera, lighting, background, effects, graphics, editing and very poor level of making. Rediff.com rated the film 1 out of 5 stars and wrote "Avoid Senior Mandrake"
