= Daivame Kaithozham K. Kumar Akanam =

- Poster
- Directed by: Salim Kumar
- Written by: Salim Kumar
- Produced by: Zachariah Thomas; Alwin Antony; Sreejith Ramachandran
- Starring: Jayaram; Anusree; Nedumudi Venu
- Cinematography: Sinu Sidharth
- Edited by: Riyaz
- Music by: Nadirshah
- Production company: United Global Media Entertainment
- Distributed by: United Global Media Entertainment
- Release date: 12 January 2018
- Running time: 150 minutes
- Country: India
- Language: Malayalam

Daivame Kaithozham K. Kumar Akanam is a 2018 Indian Malayalam-language comedy drama fantasy time travel film written and directed by Salim Kumar. It stars Jayaram and Anusree, and also features Salim Kumar, Sreenivasan, Nedumudi Venu, Harisree Ashokan, Anjali Nair, and Pradeep Kottayam. The film revolves around how the lives of K. Krishna Kumar (Jayaram) and his wife Nirmala (Anusree) go for a toss after lord almighty enters their house. This film is credited as 500th film appearance of Nedumudi Venu.

== Plot ==
The movie begins with the narration that God is planning to visit earth in order to study the humans closely and has sent his personal secretary Mayadathan to enquire about a suitable house for him to stay in. They choose the home of K. Kumar/ Krishna Kumar to stay for the duration of their visit, as he is the only person on earth who has never troubled God by praying for his needs.

God and Mayadathan arrive in Kerala and arrives at K Kumar's house. They are welcomed by the entire village and starts living at Krishna Kumar's house.

The next morning they see how life is for Krishna Kumar and his wife Nirmala. Kumar is the Panchayath Secretary and spends his time wandering around, while Nirmala spends all her time toiling in the kitchen and doing the household works. Also, Krishna Kumar is a loafer who needs his wife to do everything for him and yet doesn't appreciate it and often finds fault with her. This leads to constant bickering among the couple.

During one such fight, Nirmala and Krishna Kumar challenge each other to exchange their roles to prove whether men or women are stronger. God tries to dissuade them from this attempt and warns them that there would be dire consequences to this game. But both Nirmala and Krishna Kumar are adamant. So God allows them to do as they want.

From the next day, Nirmala goes to work and Krishna Kumar stays at home to do the household works that Nirmala used to do for him. While life is easy for Nirmala, Kumar struggles to cope with the stress of having to manage the home and Kitchen.

On a parallel track, the life of Nirmala's cousin Karimannur Gopi is shown. He lives with his wife, who is very lazy and doesn't want to cook, and his son. He is supposedly a friend of Lionel Messi and has opened a jewellery store in partnership with him.

In Kumar's house, after many days into the role swapping, Nirmala and Krishna Kumar decides to end it (as Nirmala is unable to bear how much Krishna Kumar is suffering) and tells the same to God. But God drops the bombshell by saying that it is impossible to switch the roles back now because to experience the life of a woman completely, Krishna Kumar's will have to get pregnant and give birth to a child. This shatters the couple.

The couple tries many attempts to outsmart god's plans by adopting different methods to try to abort the child Kumar is carrying but fails each time. Then the villagers come to know that Krishna Kumar is pregnant and therefore media takes up the issue and together they criticises Krishna Kumar for his pregnancy and all this makes him attempt suicide.

Then he wakes up hearing knocks on the door to find Gopi who tell him that Nirmala gave birth to a boy. It was then he realised that all he saw was just a dream.

== Cast ==
- Jayaram as Krishna Kumar
- Anusree as Nirmala
- Salim Kumar as Karimannur Gopi
- Sreenivasan as Doctor
- Nedumudi Venu as God
- Harisree Ashokan as Doctor
- Anjali Nair as Gopi's Wife
- Kulappulli Leela as Narayani Eadathi
- Prayaga Martin as College Student
- Pradeep Kottayam as Maydathan, God's Personal Secretary
- Ramesh Pisharody as TV news reader
- Kochu Preman
- Surabhi Lakshmi as Betty
- Shivaji Guruvayoor
- Indrans
- Kalabhavan Joshy as Reporter
- Prasanth Kanjiramattom as Journalist
- Vinod Kedamangalam
- Nadirshah (Cameo Appearance in song)
- P.C. George as Chief Minister
- archived footage of Lionel Messi, Cristiano Ronaldo, Luis Suárez is also used in this film

== Music ==
The music for the film is composed by Nadirsha.
