= Achan (2011 film) =

2011 Indian film by Ali Akbar

- Film DVD cover
- Directed by: Ramasimhan
- Written by: S. R. Raveendran
- Produced by: Louisiama
- Starring: Thilakan; Sasi Eranjikkal
- Cinematography: Ramasimhan
- Edited by: Ramasimhan
- Music by: Vimal
- Production company: Daridra Films International
- Distributed by: Real Images
- Release date: 14 January 2011
- Running time: 107 min.
- Country: India
- Language: Malayalam

Achan (transl. Father) is a 2011 Indian Malayalam-language drama film directed by Ali Akbar and starring Thilakan. The film is based on a drama of the same name written by S. R. Raveendran, who also scripted the film. The film's shooting began on 28 July 2010, and was scheduled to release by October. Several issues regarding the casting of Thilakan, an expelled member of the Association of Malayalam Movie Artists, led the film to a delayed release on 14 January 2011. Ali Akbar's wife produced the film; the music was composed by his daughter.

== Plot ==
The film is about an elderly gentleman Major Madhava Menon aka Major Maman (Thilakan) who has seen better days but has been left alone, and his emotional relationship with a male nurse, Rahithan (Sasi Eranjikkal). An emotional bond develops between the two. Rahithan considers the Major like his father. In between he gets thoughts of killing the Major to free both the souls of the burden they are carrying. But he can not do it and even rejects a government job in order to serve the Major. In the end, the Major sends Rahithan away at gun point, so that Rahithan should not miss his future.

== Cast ==
- Thilakan as Major Madhava Menon
- Sasi Eranjikkal as Gopalakrishnan aka Rahithan, the male nurse

== Production ==
The film is based on a drama of the same name by S. R. Raveendran. The film was shot in various parts of Kozhikode. The first shot of the film was done at the director's house in Chevayoor near Kozhikode. The film was expected to be completed within 12 days and was headed for an October release. Thilakan plays the lead role of Major Madhava Menon in the movie.

== Controversies ==
Achan was Thilakan's first film after he was expelled from the Association of Malayalam Movie Artists (AMMA). A few weeks after the film was announced, Ali Akbar's car was stoned by miscreants. The filming had to be stopped for some days following similar issues. After the filming and the post-production activities completed, the theatres was not permitted to release the film, following the issues between Ali Akbar and the Film Producers' Association. The issues had considerable media attention right from its beginning. Ali Akbar organised protests in Kozhikode in January 2011, after which the theatres were permitted a limited release.
