= Bamboo Boys =

- Directed by: Ali Akbar
- Written by: Ali Akbar
- Produced by: V. H. M. Rafeeque
- Starring: Kalabhavan Mani; Cochin Haneefa; Harishree Ashokan; Salim Kumar; Nadirshah; Jagathy Sreekumar; Kalabhavan Shajohn
- Cinematography: J. Williams
- Edited by: G. Murali
- Music by: Thej Mervin; C. Rajamani (Score)
- Production company: Sealine Movies
- Distributed by: Sealine Release; Central Pictures
- Release date: 11 October 2002
- Running time: 170 minutes
- Country: India
- Language: Malayalam

Bamboo Boys is a 2002 Indian Malayalam-language comedy film written and directed by Ali Akbar. It stars Kalabhavan Mani, Cochin Haneefa, Harishree Ashokan, Salim Kumar, Nadirshah, Jagathy Sreekumar and Kalabhavan Shajohn. The film was released on 11 October 2002. The film follows a group of tribals who attempt to bring a doctor from town to the forest to treat their headman's wife.

== Plot ==
Four tribal men from a jungle - Olanga, Nakki, Makku and Themba come to town in search of a doctor to cure their headman's wife and to win the hands of Kuduki, the headman's daughter. Being in town for the first time, everything seems new and strange for them. They engage in mischief and cause much havoc.

== Cast ==
- Kalabhavan Mani as Olanga
- Cochin Haneefa as Makku
- Harishree Ashokan as Nakki
- Salim Kumar as Themba
- Nadirshah as Velumban
- Jagathy Sreekumar as CI Varkey
- Janardanan as Balachandran aka Mula Swamy
- Mamukkoya as Kannan, Harithakumari's Father
- Bindu Panicker as Harithakumari
- Kalabhavan Shajohn as SI Jagan
- Sagar Shiyas
- Sajan Palluruthy as Velumban's assistant
- Sidha Raj as Frederick Alberto, Underworld Don
- Kalabhavan Haneef as Krishnankutty
- RLV Ramakrishnan as Dassappan

== Soundtrack ==
The film's soundtrack contains 8 songs, all composed by Thej Merwin. Lyrics were by Gireesh Puthenchery and Ali Akbar.

#	Title	Singer(s)
1	"Bamboo Boys"	Madhu Balakrishnan, Chorus
2	"Eninnale Choppanam"	Kalabhavan Mani
3	"Karutha Kozhi"	Kalabhavan Mani
4	"Karutha Muthe"	K. J. Yesudas, Sujatha Mohan
5	"Karutha Muthe" (F)	Sujatha Mohan
6	"Karutha Muthe" (M)	K. J. Yesudas
7	"Olakkai Kondu Thaalam Pidichu"	M. G. Sreekumar
8	"Om Jaya Showre"	K. S. Chitra

== Reception ==
A critic from Chithram wrote that " In short, 'Bamboo Boys' is a slapstick comedy, worth watching". A critic from Cinesouth wrote that "This should give you a fair idea of what the film would be like. Never mind the fact that the film ends well. Sometimes, nothing works like a good laugh".

In a 2023 interview with Deshabhimani magazine, Salim Kumar, one of the leading actors in the film, expressed that the movie humiliated people residing in the jungle. He revealed that he frequently left the set due to clashes over ideas and the script with the director, Ali Akbar. Kumar also mentioned that he would not have participated in the film if he were given the choice today.
