= Kalabhavan Navas =

Indian actor and comedian (1974–2025)

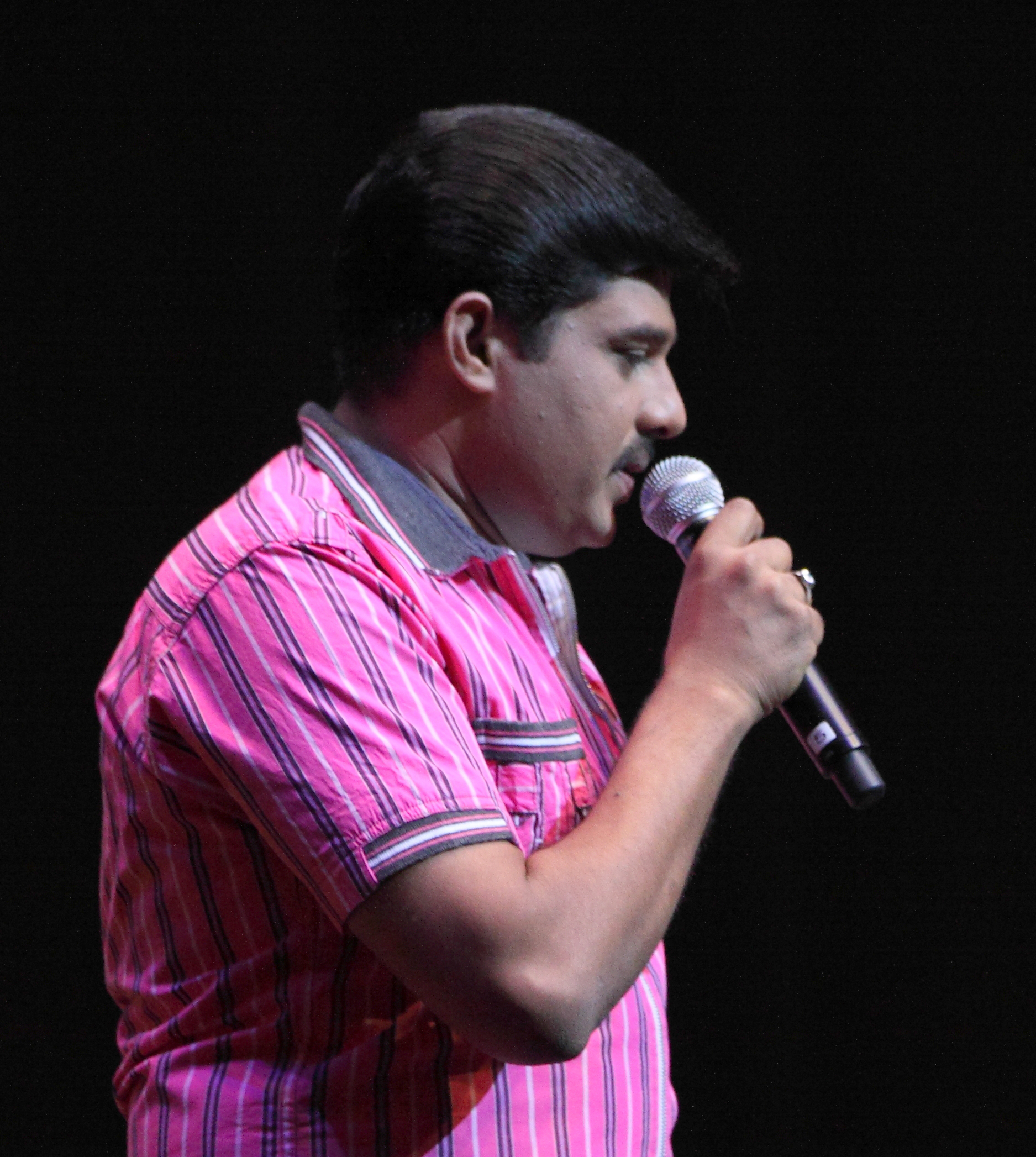
- Navas in 2010
- Born: 27 April 1974; Wadakkancherry, Thrissur, Kerala, India
- Died: 1 August 2025 (aged 51); Chottanikkara, Kerala, India
- Occupations: Actor; comedian; mimic; singer
- Years active: 1992–2025
- Spouse: Rehna Navas (m. 2002)
- Children: 3
- Father: Aboobacker
- Relatives: Niyas Backer (brother)

Navas Backer (27 April 1974 – 1 August 2025), better known by his stage name as Kalabhavan Navas, was an Indian actor, comedian and mimic. He began his career performing mimicry in stage shows and gained prominence after joining the Kalabhavan troupe, from which he adopted his professional moniker. He subsequently performed with the Cochin Arts troupe along with his brother, Niyas Backer. He was also a singer.

Navas made his film debut in Chaithanyam (1995) and appeared in approximately 50 Malayalam films, primarily in comedic roles. He is best known for his roles in Mimics Action 500 (1995), Hitler Brothers (1997), Junior Mandrake (1997), Mattupetti Machan (1998), Chandamama (1999) and Thillana Thillana (2003).

== Early life ==
Navas was born in a village at Wadakkancherry, Thrissur, on 27 April 1974. His father, Aboobacker, was a theatre and film actor who had appeared in several Malayalam films, while his mother, originally from Ernakulam, was a homemaker. Navas grew up with two siblings — an elder brother, Niyas, and a younger brother, Nisam. The family were practising Muslims. Though his father worked as an actor, his earnings were meagre, and the family lived within limited means during Navas's childhood.

After beginning his career as an artist, he moved to his mother's ancestral home in Ernakulam and lived there for twenty years. His brother, Niyas Backer, also went on to become a comic actor in film and television. His other brother Nisam (Nisamuddin) became a journalist.

== Career ==
Navas and his brother Niyas Backer used to visit the filming location of Venkalam, directed by Bharathan — who was also from Wadakkanchery — and would perform skits at the artists' camp. Inspired by mimicry artists of the time such as Jayaram and Zainuddin, the brothers developed a keen interest in mimicry and began performing on stage. Navas later joined Kalabhavan, where he started doing professional mimicry shows. Eventually, he became independent and, together with his brother Niyas, founded Cochin Arts, under which they continued performing mimicry. Navas used to imitate his father's role in Vatsalyam on stage.

Navas debuted as an actor in the feature film Mr and Mrs in 1992 as Newspaper Boy. He mostly played comic roles in films. He is best known for his roles in Mimics Action 500 (1995), Hitler Brothers (1997), Junior Mandrake (1997), Mattupetti Machan (1998), Chandamama (1999) and Thillana Thillana (2003). Sometime after his marriage, Navas wrote and directed the telefilm Velicham, which also featured his wife Rehna. The couple also appeared together in the short film Mandan Bench in 2015. The couple once again played leading roles in the 2025 film Izha, which also marked Rehna's return to feature films. His final release before death was Detective Ujjwalan (2025). That same year, he acted in Tiki Taka and Prakambanam. He died shortly after completing the latter.

== Personal life and death ==
Navas was married to Rehna, who had acted in a few films and television serials. Their marriage was arranged while they were both acting in the film Neelakasham Niraye (2002). The couple had three children — Naharin, Rihan and Ridwan. After their marriage, Navas built a house in Choondy, Aluva, where they lived for several years. Eventually, they moved to a new home he constructed at Nalam Mile, Aluva. Later on, Rehna repurposed their former residence, converting the upper floor into a boutique and the ground floor into a nursery school. She is originally from Palluruthy. Their daughter Naharin debuted in the film Confessions of a Cuckoo (2021).

On 1 August 2025, Navas was found unconscious at a hotel in Chottanikkara, after having returned to his room after a film's shooting. His death was confirmed at the nearest hospital due to cardiac arrest. He was 51.

== Filmography ==
=== Films ===
Year	Title	Role	Notes
1992	Mr and Mrs	Newspaper Boy	(Debut cameo)
1993	Venkalam		Cameo
1995	Chaithanyam		playback singer
1995	Ezharakoottam		
1995	Mimics Action 500	Babykutty	
1995	Kalamasseriyil Kalyanayogam	Navas	
1995	Kidilol Kidilam	Krishnankutty	
1996	Mimics Super 1000		
1996	Ishtamanu Nooruvattom		
1997	Hitler Brothers	Thankappan	
1997	Siamese Irattakal		
1997	Junior Mandrake	Sandeep Nambiar	
1998	Mayajalam	Pappan	
1998	Amma Ammaayiyamma	Sharath	
1998	Meenakshi Kalyanam	Unnikrishnan	
1998	Mattupetti Machan	Unnikrishnan	
1998	Aagosham		
1999	Chandamama	Pullepadi Monayi	
1999	My Dear Karadi	Appukuttan	
1999	Auto Brothers		
2001	One Man Show	Shajahan	
2001	House Owner		
2001	Korappan The Great		
2002	Neelakasham Niraye		
2002	Desam		
2003	Thillana Thillana	Govindan	
2004	Vettam	Prince	
2005	Thamburankunnu		
2006	Chakkara Muthu	Santhosh	
2006	Anuvadhamillathe		
2009	Chattambinadu	Manikandan	
2009	Boomi Malayalam		
2010	Senior Mandrake	Sandeep Nambiar	
2010	Valiyangadi	Pariyakutty	
2010	Kaaryasthan	Himself	Cameo
2011	Veeraputhran		
2012	Cobra		Also Playback Singer
2012	Thalsamayam Oru Penkutty	Gymman	
2013	ABCD: American-Born Confused Desi	Saji	
2013	The Factory		Single Character Film
2014	Mylanchi Monchulla Veedu	Khadar	
2015	John Honai	Jaffer	
2015	Ormakalil Oru Manjukaalam		
2015	3 Wicketinu 365 Runs		
2016	Iyer in Pakistan		
2017	Pretham Undu Sookshikkuka		
2017	Achayans	Fr. Jose Kireekadan's Assistant	
2018	Priyapettavar		
2018	Prashnaparihara Shala		
2019	Thanka Bhasma Kuriyitta Thamburatti	SI Rajan	
2019	Visudha Pusthakam		
2019	Mera Naam Shaji	Marunnu Johny	
2019	Driving License	Menon	
2021	Louis		
2023	Vanita		
2023	A Ranjith Cinema	Yousaf	
2023	KrishnaKripa Sagaram		
2024	Aaro		
2024	Oru Anweshanathinte Thudakkam	Rajeev	
2024	Izha	Shoukath	
2025	Detective Ujjwalan	Ashokan	
2025	Tikki Taka	Philip	Posthumous release
2025	Prakambanam		Posthumous release

=== Television ===
As Host

- Badai Bungalow
- Rani Maharani

As Judge

- Comedy Masters
- Comedy Stars Season 2
- Thakarppan Comedy
- Oru Chiri Iru Chiri Bumber Chiri Season 2

Himself as Guest

- Cinema Chirima
- Onnum Onnum Moonu
- Manam Pole Mangalyam
- Komedy Circus
- Star Ragging
- Idavelayil

TV serials

- Veedu
- Bhagyanakshatram
