= Swastham Grihabharanam =

- Directed by: Ali Akbar
- Written by: Siddique Thamarasseri
- Screenplay by: Siddique Thamarasseri
- Produced by: Kamarudeen K
- Starring: Mukesh; Jagathy Sreekumar; Sukanya; Jagadish
- Cinematography: Madhu Adoor
- Edited by: G. Murali
- Music by: Berny-Ignatius
- Distributed by: Samthirpthi Films
- Release date: 1999
- Running time: 136 minutes
- Country: India
- Language: Malayalam

Swastham Grihabharanam (transl. On peace with houseduty) is a 1999 Indian Malayalam-language film directed by Ali Akbar and produced by Kamarudeen K. The film stars Mukesh, Jagathy Sreekumar, Sukanya and Jagadish in the lead roles. The film has musical score by Berny-Ignatius. The songs are written by Chittur Gopi.

== Plot ==
Unni is the son of late Balan master, a reputed social service person in the village. Unni is unemployed and decides to start a living and working as a Fishmonger. However he gets into trouble with Moori Moosa, the goon in the market. This tosses Unni into the rivalry between local tycoons, Veerabhadran Nair and Bhargava Kurup

== Cast ==
- Mukesh as Unni
- Jagathy Sreekumar as Pachu
- Sukanya as Aswathi
- Jagadish as Appu
- Rajan P Dev as Veerabhadran Nair
- N F Varghese as Pattatharayil Bhargava Kurup
- K. P. A. C. Lalitha as Unni's Mother
- Paravoor Ramachandran as Captain
- Indrans as Vilakkoothi Vasu
- Mamukkoya as Mammathu
- Vijayakumar as Shibu
- Sidharaj as Balan Mashu
- Tony as Madhu
- K. P. A. C. Azeez as Pathrose
- Kalpana as Sarala
- Machan Varghese as Damodaran
- Lissy Jose as VeeraBhadran Nair's Wife
- Aliyar as Govindan

== Soundtrack ==
The songs were composed by Berny Ignatius with lyrics by Chittoor Gopi.

നമ്പർ.	പാട്ട്	പാട്ടുകാർ	രാഗം
1	Chenkurinji Poo Penne	KS Chithra	
2	Chenkurinji Poo Penne (D)	KS Chithra, Kester	
3	Moovarnakkodi Paarukayaay	KJ Yesudas	
4	Raappadikal Moolunnitha	KJ Yesudas	
5	Vellikkinnam Thullum	KS Chithra	
