= Abel Periyappuram =

Catholic priest

Abel Periappuram
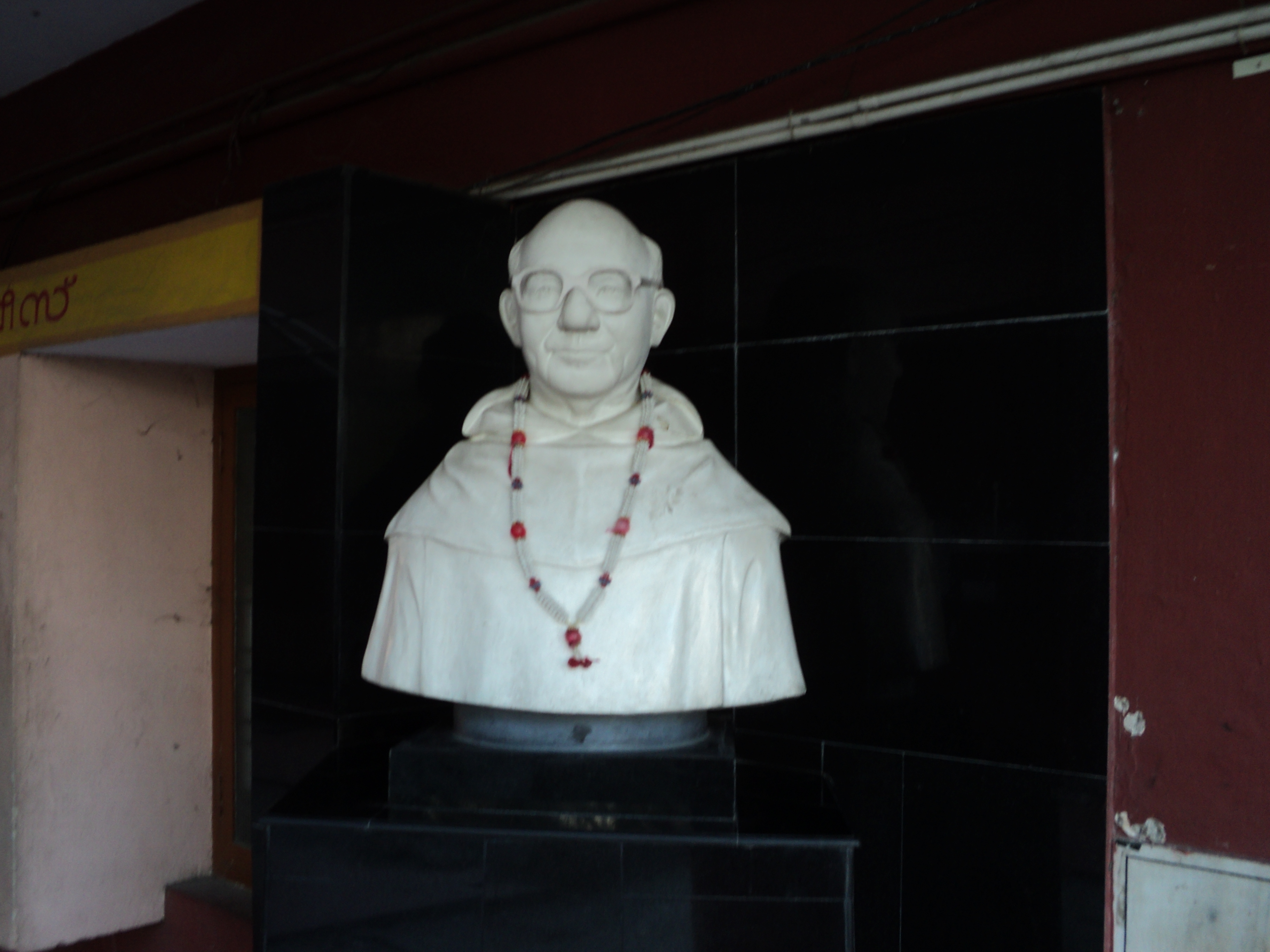
- Statue at Kalabhavan
- Born: P. M. Mathew; 19 January 1920; Mulakulam, Kingdom of Travancore, British India (present day Ernakulam, Kerala, India)
- Died: 27 October 2001 (aged 81); Thodupuzha, Idukki, Kerala, India
- Resting place: St Anne's CMI Monastery Kurianad, Kuravilangadu, Kottayam District
- Education: Sapienza University of Rome (Doctor of Philosophy)
- Occupations: Catholic priest; Journalist; Lyricist
- Years active: 1963–2001

Fr. Abel Periappuram (born Periappuram Mathan Mathew, 19 January 1920 – 27 October 2001), commonly known as Fr. Abel, was an Indian Syro-Malabar Catholic CMI priest, journalist, and lyricist, best known as the founding father of Kalabhavan, a centre for learning performance arts in Kochi, India. Periappuram, with the help of K. K. Antony, a music teacher, and K. J. Yesudas, then a budding playback singer, started Kalabhavan as the Christian Arts Club to promote Christian music, in the year 1969. Soon, with the support of Archbishop Joseph Parecattil and the Archdiocese of Eranakulam, the Club was registered as Kalabhavan.

== Early life and education ==
Abel Periappuram was born on 19 January 1920 in Mulakulam village (near Piravom) as P. M. Mathew to Aleyamma and Mathen Vaidyar of the Periappuram house, as their fifth child. In the 1940s, he set out for pastoral studies at Mannanam, Thevara and Koonammavu. He later went to Mangalore and was ordained as a priest in 1951, as custom he changed his name to Abel Periappuram, Periappuram being his surname.

== Career ==
In 1952, he joined the Deepika Daily at Kottayam as a journalist. The next year, he left for Rome, where, from the Sapienza University of Rome, he took a Doctorate in Journalism and Political science. On returning to Kerala, he rejoined the Deepika Daily, where he worked as an assistant managing director, till 1961. During this time, he started writing lyrics and poetry. He was then entrusted with a job of a professor at St. Joseph's College, Devagiri. On the request of Joseph Parecattil, Periappuram moved to Ernakulam to translate Christian prayer books from Syriac to Malayalam. This gave him the idea of writing original devotional songs in Malayalam. He penned the lyrics to numerous songs which were set to music by K. K. Antony. Their music was successful among the public as well as with the clergy. Kalabhavan was started in 1963 to train young artists in formal music education.

== Death ==
Periappuram died on 27 October 2001, at the age of 81 at Thodupuzha, following a cardiac arrest. His body was kept at Ernakulam Town Hall for the public to pay homage, two days later.
