= Karutha Joothan =

- Theatrical release poster
- Directed by: Salim Kumar
- Written by: Salim Kumar
- Produced by: Salim Kumar; Madhavan Chettikkal
- Starring: Salim Kumar; Ramesh Pisharody; Usha; Subheesh Sudhi; Shivaji Guruvayoor
- Cinematography: Sreejith Vijayan
- Edited by: Premsai
- Music by: B. R. Bijuram
- Production company: Laughing Buddha
- Distributed by: LJ Films
- Release date: 18 August 2017 (Kerala)
- Country: India
- Language: Malayalam

Karutha Joothan (English: The Black Jew) is a 2017 Indian Malayalam-language film written, directed and produced by Salim Kumar and starring himself in the lead role. Ramesh Pisharody, Subheesh Sudhi, and Usha other important roles. The film narrates the decimation of the Jewish community and its history in Mala, a small village in the Thrissur district of Kerala, through the life of Aron Ilyahu, a member of a prosperous Jewish family.

The film released on 18 August 2017 in Kerala. At the 47th Kerala State Film Awards, the film received the Best Story for Kumar.

== Plot ==
The story deals with the Jewish history in Kerala of 2000 years, mixed with the protagonist's autobiography. The protagonist shown in the film is Aaron Eliyahu, a Jew from the village of Mala. This film reminds one of the strong friendship of the Muslim Beerankunj and the Jew Aaron. It highlights the importance of the demolition of ancient memorials and restructuring new ones on them for the heirs of a new world. Above all the film sheds light on the impact created by Palestine - Israel conflict on the village of Mala in India. Aaron Eliyahu travels in search of the roots of the Jew tradition of 2000 years in India. Aaron starts his journey for this from the village of Mala. In the midst of his search the news of his death in a motor accident spreads. Independent Israel calls for the return of all the Jews to Israel from all over the world. Obeying the command of the Jewish chief of Mala, along with the other Jews, Veronica; the mother of Aaron, entrusts all her property with the Panchayath and she leaves for Israel. Really Aaron was not dead; he was in coma in a hermitage in North India. One night Aron returns to Mala, to his embarrassment, he sees his own house converted into Mala Postal Office and the natives are enjoying his property. The natives and the Panchayth authorities refuse to return the property of Aaron. They have their own justification that this person is not real Aaron, and he is an imposter to grab the property. Aaron has lost his own identity, the rulers and the people isolate him. But the Jew gets help only from his old Muslim friend Beerankunj. Even in court Aaron has no concrete evidence to establish his own identity. He is thrown into street. The film ‘The Black Jew’ reveals the unexpected happenings passing through the three generations of Aaron and Beerankunj.

== Cast ==
- Salim Kumar
- Ramesh Pisharody
- Usha
- Sivaji Guruvayoor
- Subeesh Sudhi
- Jaffar Idukki

== Production ==
Karutha Joothan is the second directorial of Salim Kumar after Compartment. B. R. Bijuram composed the music for the lyrics of Swami Samvidanand. Ganesh K. Marar and Davinci Suresh was the sound director and art director, respectively.
