= R. L. V. Ramakrishnan =

Indian classical dancer

Dr. R. L. V. Ramakrishnan
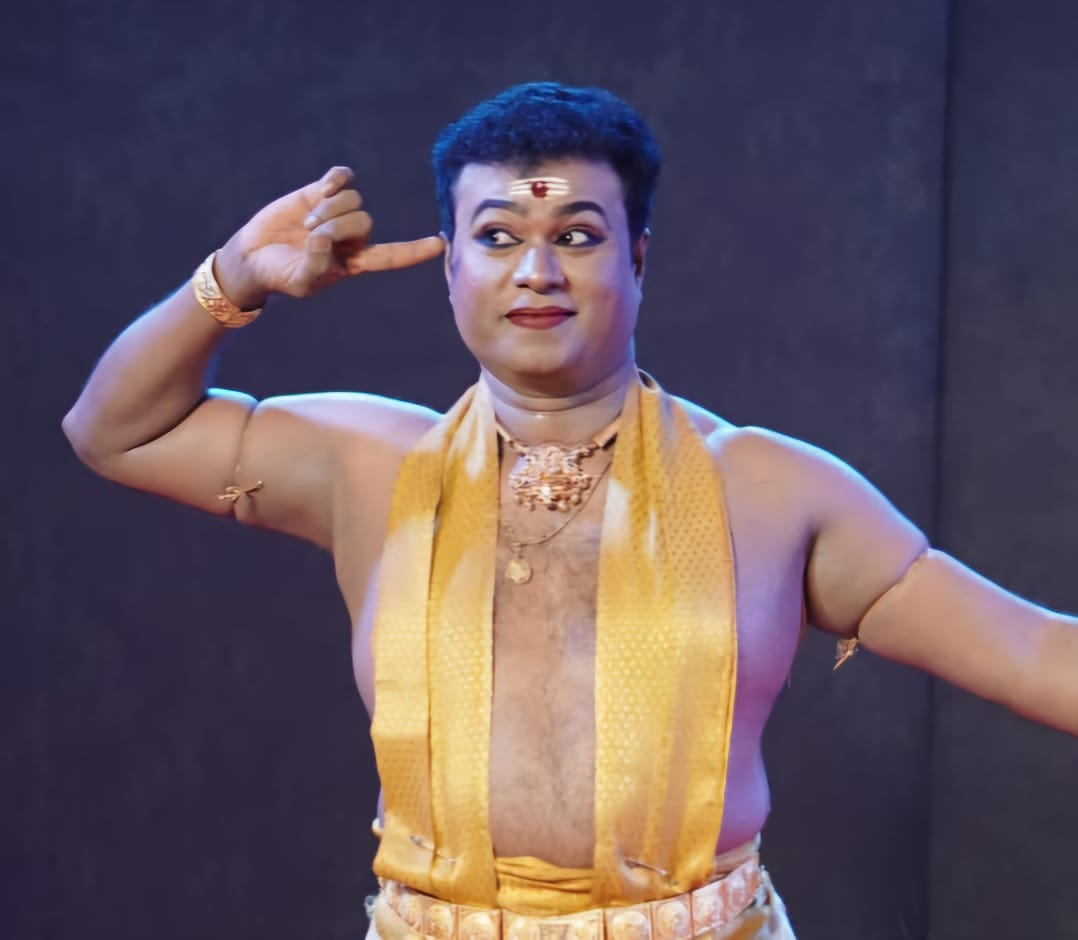
- Ramakrishnan during a Mohiniyattam performance
- Born: Ramakrishnan; Kerala, India
- Occupations: Classical dancer; Professor; Film Actor
- Relatives: Kalabhavan Mani (brother)
- Awards: Kerala Sangeetha Nataka Akademi Award
- Honours: Degree of Doctor of Philosophy in Mohiniyattam

Dr. R. L. V. Ramakrishnan is an Indian classical dancer and film actor from Kerala. He completed his Doctor of Philosophy (Ph.D.) in 2019 and currently serves as an Assistant Professor in the Department of Bharatanatyam at Kerala Kalamandalam. In 2022, he was honored with the Kerala Sangeetha Nataka Akademi Award for his contributions to Mohiniyattam.

== Early life ==
Ramakrishnan was born in Chalakudy. His brother is Kalabhavan Mani. He was a Kalaprathibha from the MG University in 2001.

Ramakrishnan is a male Mohiniyattam dancer from Kerala, known for his contributions to the art form traditionally performed by women. Hailing from a dedicated artistic family, Ramakrishnan began his classical dance journey at the age of 10 under the tutelage of Guru RLV Anand Master. He has an academic background in Mohiniyattam, having completed both a Diploma and Post-Diploma with First Class honors from RLV College, Tripunithura. He later earned a Masters degree in Mohiniyattam, securing the First Rank from Mahatma Gandhi University, and pursued an M.Phil. from Kerala Kalamandalam, Deemed University.

== Career ==
R. L. V. Ramakrishnan obtained a Ph.D. in Mohiniyattam from Kerala Kalamandalam under the guidance of Dr. N. K. Geetha. His doctoral research, titled "Masculine Heritage in Dance: An Enquiry Based on Mohiniyattam," explores the potential of male dancers in this traditionally female-dominated dance form. He is a qualified UGC-NET scholar in Performing Arts and holds the "A Top" grade from Doordarshan Kendra, New Delhi.

Ramakrishnan has performed at many national and international festivals in Kerala and abroad including the Nishagandhi Dance Festival, Soorya Festival, Kerala Cultural Tourism Festival, Mrinalini Sarabhai Dharpana dance festivel Gujarat, Devadasi festival Odisha, AIDA Festival Chhattisgarh and Naadam Festival, among others. In addition to his performances, he has presented papers at UGC-approved national and international seminars on Mohiniyattam.

Ramakrishnan has served as a Guest Lecturer in Mohiniyattam at RLV College and Sree Sankaracharya University of Sanskrit (SSUS), Kalady. His contributions to Mohiniyattam have earned him several accolades, including the Kerala Sangeetha Nataka Akademi Puraskaram, the Kerala Kshetra Kala Puraskaram, Devadasi Puraskar from Odisha and the CCRT Senior Fellowship (National) in Mohiniyattam.

Ramakrishnan also earned an M.A. in Bharatanatyam with a Second Rank from Sree Sankaracharya University of Sanskrit.

In January 2024, he was appointed as an Assistant Professor of Bharatanatyam at the Kerala Kalamandalam. Ramakrishnan is the first male Bharatanatyam teacher in the history of the Kerala Kalamandalam.

== Filmography and discography ==
Year	Movie	Notes	References
2002	Bamboo Boys	Debut movie	
2004	Masanagudi Mannadiyar Speaking		
2004	Quotation		
2005	Maniyarakallan		
2010	Canvas		
2018	Theeta Rappai	Lead Actor	
2020	Zebra Varakal		
2022	1921: Puzha Muthal Puzha Vare		

Year	Song	Movie / Album	Reference
2014	Kozhiyaruthu	Kavile Manippattu	
2017	Ponmani Koodaram	Ponmani Koodaram	
2018	Chalakudi Chandaku Pokumbo	Chalakkudikkaran Changathi	
2018	Kummatti Koottavum	Theetta Rappayi	
2019	Kokkarakko Kozhi Koovunne	Chalakkudikkaran Changathi	
2021	Parayappattu	Parayappattu	
2024	Ayyante Ponnambalam	Ayyante Ponnambalam	
2024	Kuppi Vala Kayyale	Chaar Chor	

Year	Album	Reference
2017	Ponmani Koodaram	
2019	Vel Vel	
2019	Sarayoo	
2024	Ayyante Ponnambalam	

== Awards and papers ==
Year	Type	Title/Description	Event	Ref
2013	Award	Kalabharathi Yuva Nrutha Pratibha Award	The National Young Dance Fest 2013	
2017	Award	Naatya Kala Poorna Award in the field of Mohiniyattam	Naatya Kousthubh Nrithyotsav 2017	
2017	Award	Nritya Kala Vidwaan Award in the field of Mohiniyattam	International Dancer's Alley Fests 2017	
2019	Award	Naadam Natyaprabha Award	Naadam Nrithyothsav International Classical Dance Festival 2019	
2019	Paper	Music and Dance in Vedas, Upanishads, Epics, and Sanga Literature - An Exploration – Two-day conference organized by Annamalai University.	International Conference (August 2019)	
2019	Chaired	Exploration of Theory and Praxis with focus on Bharatanatyam and Mohiniyattam performances.	Three-day National Seminar in Sree Sankara College, Kalady. (February 2019)	
2019	Paper	Thandava Lasya Sankalpangal Bharatheeya Sashthreeya Nrutharoopangail Natyasastra Grandhangale Adisthaanamakkiyulla Padanam — Study based on Natyasastra concepts.	Three-day National Seminar in Sree Sankara College, Kalady. (February 2019)	
2019	Doctoral Degree	Degree of Doctor of Philosophy "MASCULINE WAYS IN DANCE - AN ENQUIRY BASED ON Mohiniyattam"	Kerala Kalamandalam Deemed University	
2020	Paper	Influence of Natya Shastra on Kathakali and Mohiniyattam.	Two-day International Seminar (January 2020)	
2020	Paper	Natya Shastra Sankethangal in Mohiniyattam	Three-day National Seminar on Sanskrit Dramas and Fine Arts 2020	
2020	Paper	Natya Sankalpa in Mohiniyattam	International Seminar in Sree Sankara College, Kalady. (February 2020)	
2020	Paper	Femininity and Manhood in Indian Classical Dance.	Three-day Seminar (February 2020)	
2020	Chair	Problematizing Gender in Indian Classical Dance.	Three-day National Seminar (February 2020)	
2021	Award	Kerala Sangeetha Nataka Academy Award (Mohiniyattam)	Akademi Award 2021	
2022	Award	Kerala State Kshethrakala Fellowship from Kshethrakala Academy	Kshethrakala Academy Awards 2022	
2023	Paper	Male Lineage in Indian Classical Dances.	Three-day National Seminar (February 2023)	
2023	Award	Performance in World of Dance - 2023	6th Edition of Celebrating World of Dance - 2023 by Natarani and JG University.	
2023	Award	Participation Certificate at 11th Peringottukara Devasthanam Dakshinamoorthi Sangeetha Nritholsavam	11th Peringottukara Devasthanam Dakshinamoorthi Sangeetha Nritholsavam	
2023	Paper	Critical study related to Sukumara Concepts in Mohiniyattam.	International Seminar (March 2023)	

== Controversies ==
In October 2020, Ramakrishnan was denied a chance to perform Mohiniyattam in the online dance festival program of Kerala Sangeeta Nataka Academy which led to controversy. He allegedly attempted suicide after experiencing caste discrimination.
