= Mulakulam =

- Village
- Location in Kerala, India Mulakulam (India)
- Coordinates: 9°50′30″N 76°29′15″E
- Country: India
- State: Kerala
- District: Kottayam / Ernakulam

Languages
  - Official: Malayalam, English
- Time zone: UTC+5:30 (IST)
- PIN: 686610
- Vehicle registration: KL-36/17
- Nearest city: Piravom, Elanji
- Lok Sabha constituency: Kottayam

Mulakulam is a village spread over the Kottayam and Ernakulam districts of Kerala, India, and is situated on the banks of the River Muvattupuzha. Mulakulam lies in one municipality viz Piravom municipality and Mulakulam grama panchayath. While Mulakulam North falls under the purview of Piravom municipality in Ernakulam District, Mulakulam South is governed by the Mulakulam panchayat of Kottayam district. The village is located about 38 kilometers from both Kottayam town and Kochi city (the commercial capital of Kerala). Piravom and Elanji is the nearest town. The population of this village is about 22360 people.

== Notable people ==
- Chemmanam Chacko - Poet
- Ramesh Pisharody - Cine Artist
- Fr. Abel
