= Kalpana (Malayalam actress) =

Indian actress (1965–2016)

- Born: Kalpana Ranjani; 5 October 1965; Trivandrum, Kerala, India
- Died: 25 January 2016 (aged 50); Hyderabad, Telangana, India
- Occupation: Film actress
- Years active: 1977–2016
- Spouse: Anil Kumar (m. 1998; div. 2012)
- Children: 1
- Relatives: Kalaranjini (sister); Urvashi (sister); Sooranad Kunjan Pillai (grandfather)

Kalpana Priyadarshini (5 October 1965 – 25 January 2016), better known mononymously as Kalpana, was an Indian actress who appeared in South Indian films, predominantly in Malayalam and Tamil. Kalpana acted in over 300 films in various South Indian languages. She won the National Film Award for Best Supporting Actress for her performance in Thanichalla Njan (2012) at the 60th National Film Awards. Kalpana began her career as a child artist in the late 1970s. She became popular among the audiences for her comic roles.

== Career ==
Kalpana began her career as a child artist in the film Vidarunna Mottukal. After making her debut as a mainstream actor in the 1982 film Pokkuveyil, directed by G. Aravindan, she went on to star in several critically acclaimed films and her portrayals as a comedian were appreciated by critics. Her Tamil debut was through the 1985 released successful film Chinna Veedu, opposite K. Bhagyaraj. Her other memorable films include Sathi Leelavathi (1995) and Kaliveedu (1996). She performed in a music album with Usha Uthup. She published her memoirs, Njan Kalpana. Kalpana sang a song in the movie Kudumbakodathi, along with K.S. Chithra.

== Personal life ==
Kalpana was born to theater artists Chavara V. P. Nair and Vijayalakshmi. Actors Kalaranjini and Urvashi are her sisters. Her two brothers, Kamal Roy and Prince, had also acted in a few Malayalam movies. Prince (who acted as Nandu in Layanam) committed suicide at the age of 17. Kamal Roy (who acted as Ananthapadmanabhan in Kalyana Sougandhikam) died in 2026 at the age of 54 due to heart failure.

She married Malayalam film director Anil Kumar in 1998. They divorced in 2012. They have one daughter.

== Death ==
Kalpana went to Hyderabad for the shooting of the movie Oopiri / Thozha which starred Karthi. On 25 January 2016, she was found unconscious in her hotel room and was immediately taken to the hospital, but died of a heart attack on the way. Following a postmortem, her body was flown to her native place on 26 January 2016. The funeral took place on the same day.

== Awards ==
- 2013 - National Film Award for Best Supporting Actress – for the film Thanichalla Njan
- 2016 - Asianet Film Awards for Best Supporting Actress - for the film Charlie (Posthumously awarded)
- 2016 - Henko Flowers Indian Film Awards for Best Supporting Actress - for the film Charlie (Posthumously awarded)
- 2016 - South Indian International Movie Awards for Best Supporting Actress (Malayalam) - for the film Charlie (Nominated only)
- 2016 - CPC Cine Awards for Best supporting actress - for the film Charlie (Nominated only)

== Filmography ==
=== Malayalam ===
List of Kalpana Malayalam film credits
Year	Film	Role	Notes
1977	Vidarunna Mottukal		Child artist
1979	Sikharangal	Pankajam	
1980	Dwik Vijayam		Child Artist
1981	Pathirasooryan	Joly's friend	
1982	Pokkuveyil	Nisha	
1982	Ithum Oru Jeevitham	Sheela	
1982	Yaagam	Kannamma	
1982	Anthiveyilile Ponnu		
1983	Thaavalam	Latha	
1983	Manju	Rashmi	
1983	Aadhipathyam	Gracy	
1984	Radhayude Kamukan		
1984	Bullet		
1984	Panchavadi Palam	Anarkali	
1985	Ithu Nalla Thamasha	Sundari/Gracy	
1985	Choodatha Pookal	Hema's friend	
1985	Paara		
1985	Pathamudayam		
1986	Ithramathram	Rajani	
1986	Naale Njangalude Vivaham	Mini's friend	
1986	Ninnistham Ennishtam		
1989	Oru Sayahnathinte Swapnam	Thankamani	
1989	Peruvannapurathe Visheshangal	Mohini	
1990	Dr. Pasupathy	U. D. C. Kumari	
1990	Kouthuka Varthakal	Kamalu	
1990	Maalayogam	Subhadra	
1990	Orukkam	Alice	
1990	Superstar	Shakuntala	
1990	Saandhram	Anna	
1990	Kashandikku Marumarunnu		
1991	Inspector Balram	SI Dakshayani	
1991	Ottayal Pattalam	Venu's lover	
1991	Post Box No. 27	Gayathri	
1991	Innathe Program	Minikutty	
1991	Pookkalam Varavayi	Tuition Teacher	
1991	Souhrudam	Annamma	
1991	Adayalam	Rosemary	
1992	Ennodishtam Koodamo	Bhagyam	
1992	Cheppadividya	Mary	
1992	Ardram	Jaanu	
1992	Mr & Mrs	Kalpana	
1992	Aparatha	Mary	
1993	Butterflies	Parukutty	
1993	Gandharvam	Kottarakara Komalam	
1993	Narayam	Amina' s kin	
1993	Injakkadan Mathai & Sons	Annakutty	
1993	Kabooliwala	Chandrika	
1993	Kavadiyattam	Dolly	
1993	Ponnu Chami	Valli	
1993	Porutham	Vasantha Kokila	
1993	Kalippattam	Meenakshi	
1993	Sakshal Sreeman Chathunni	Reshmi	
1993	Uppukandam Brothers	Elamma	
1994	Dadha	Anandam	
1994	CID Unnikrishnan B.A., B.Ed.	House Maid	
1994	Kudumba Vishesham	Alykutty	
1994	Pidakkozhi Koovunna Noottandu	Ponnamma	
1994	Poochakkaru Mani Kettum	Karthika	
1994	Sukham Sukhakaram	Lilly	
1994	The President		
1995	Kaattile Thadi Thevarude Ana	Kanaka	
1995	Kalamasseriyil Kalyanayogam	Chempakasseri Sakunthala	
1995	Achan Kombathu Amma Varampathu	Swayamprabha	
1995	Parvathy Parinayam	Radha	
1995	Pai Brothers	Komalam	
1995	Avittam Thirunaal Aarogya Sriman	Kousalya	
1995	Punnaram	Chandrika	
1995	Rajakeeyam	Snehaprabha	
1995	Peter Scott	Bessy	
1995	No 1 Snehatheeram Bangalore North	Metilda	
1995	Mangala Soothram	Sumithra	
1995	Three Men Army	Indira Devi	
1995	Manashasthranjante Diary		
1995	Nirnayam		
1996	Excuse Me Ethu Collegila	Sundari	
1996	Kaathil Oru Kinnaram	Manikutty	
1996	Kaliveedu	Mary	
1996	Harbour	Palisha Kathreena	
1996	Kudumbakodathi	Gundur Parvathi	
1996	Malayaalamaasam Chingam Onninu	Rukku	
1996	Aramana Veedum Anjoorekkarum	Swarnam	
1997	Itha Oru Snehagatha	Kochuthresia	
1997	Junior Mandrake	Vandana	
1997	Kalyana Unnikal	Lucie	
1997	Ancharakalyanam	Kalyani	
1997	Raajathanthram	Damayanthi	
1997	Kottapurathe Koottukudumbam	Chandrika	
1997	Mannadiar Penninu Chenkotta Checkan	Chamba	
1997	Newspaper Boy	Komalam	
1997	Anuragakottaram	Mother Superior	
1997	Ullasapoongattu	Marykutti	
1997	Arjunan Pillayum Anchu Makkalum	Jayaprabha	
1997	Ishtadanam	Stella	
1997	Anubhoothi	Ambujakshan's wife	
1997	Five Star Hospital	Nurse Snehalatha	
1997	Mayaponman	Meenakshi	
1998	Alibabayum Arara Kallanmarum	Thanki	
1998	Graama Panchaayathu	Pankajakshi	
1998	Harthal	Dimple Mariya	
1998	Sooryaputhran	Neeli	
1998	Malabaril Ninnoru Manimaaran	Chandhrika	
1998	Kudumba Vaarthakal	Meera	
1998	Manthri Kochamma	Jayan's sister	
1998	Inspector Eeswara Iyer Green Roomilundu		
1999	American Ammayi	Thresia	
1999	Aakasha Ganga	Kochuthresia/ Krishnan's wife / Aaveshananda Swamigal Aaveshananda Swamigal	
1999	Chandamama	Kochammini	
1999	Charlie Chaplin	Chandrika	
1999	Swastham Grihabharanam	Sarala	
1999	Pranaya Nilavu		
2000	Kannaadikkadavathu	Bhavani	
2000	Manassil Oru Manjuthulli	Rajamma	
2000	Sayahnam	Mary Thomas	
2000	Manjukaalappakshi		
2000	Nishasurabhikal		
2001	Ishtam	SI Mariyamma Thomas	
2001	Ennum Sambhavami Yuge Yuge	Tapinokia / Kalyani	
2001	Kathakan		
2002	Chirikudukka	Seemanthini	
2002	Kakke Kakke Koodevide	Rahel	
2002	Kannaki	Kanakammal	
2002	Www.anukudumbam.com	Thief	
2002	Kashillatheyum Jeevikkam	Annamma	
2002	Krishna Gopalakrishna	Sujatha	
2002	Oomappenninu Uriyadappayyan	Kanyaka	
2002	Aaradyam Parayum		
2003	Varum Varunnu Vannu	House maid	
2003	Mizhi Randilum	Saradha	
2003	The Fire	Fathima Beevi	
2003	Mr. Brahmachari	Anasooya	
2003	Melvilasam Sariyanu	Sarasamma P. Varghese	
2003	Vellithira	Pushpam	
2004	Mambazhakkalam	Neelima	
2004	Vismayathumbathu	Maya	
2004	Vellinakshatram	School principal	
2004	Thalamelam	Kanakavalli	
2004	Sethurama Iyer CBI	Vijayamma	
2004	Priyam Priyamkaram	Alamelu	
2004	Nerkku Nere	Devu	
2005	Krithyam	Victoria	
2005	Athbhutha Dweepu	Mallika	
2005	Bunglavil Outha	Chemparathy	
2005	Udayon	Kunjujamma	
2005	Kalabham	Pachakili	
2005	Bus Conductor	Ambili	
2005	Five Fingers	Marykutti	
2006	Balram vs. Tharadas	Circle Inspector Dakshayani	
2007	The Unakka Chemmeen	Karuthamma	
2007	Anchil Oral Arjunan	Shantha	
2007	Bharathan Effect	Chinnakutty	
2008	Apoorva	Teacher	
2008	Kovalam	Mariya	
2008	De Ingottu Nokkiye	Ammu	
2008	Bullet	Reality Show Judge	
2008	Twenty:20	Swarnamma	
2008	Pakal Nakshatrangal	Raji	
2009	Bharya Onnu Makkal Moonnu	Dance teacher	
2009	Loud Speaker	Rugmini	
2009	Sanmanasullavan Appukuttan	Vasundhara	
2009	Kerala Cafe	Manikantan's wife	
2009	Seetha Kalyanam	Ramani	
2009	Thirunakkara Perumal	Pushpavalli	
2009	Saswatham		
2009	Paleri Manikyam: Oru Pathirakolapathakathinte Katha		
2010	Senior Mandrake	Vandana	
2010	Nizhal	Canteen owner (Maami)	
2010	Nirakazhcha	Aksharavalli	
2010	Yugapurushan	Drunkard Paramu's wife	
2010	Darpapnam	Kousalya	
2010	Njaan Sanchaari	Dr. Arundhathi	
2010	Jayan, the Man behind the Legend (Documentary)	Herself	
2010	Oru Small Family		
2010	Aakaashayathra		
2010	Pathamadhyam		
2011	Uppukandam Brothers: Back in Action	Elamma	Archive footage
2011	Shankaranum Mohananum	Janaki	
2011	Salt N' Pepper	Mary	
2011	Kanakompathu	Hotel Manager	
2011	Ninnishtam Ennishtam 2	Muthulakshmi	
2011	Pachuvum Kovalanum	Annamma	
2011	Snehadharam		
2011	Paarvanam		
2011	Sneham + Ishtam = Amma		
2011	Darsanasya Maunam		
2011	Living Together		
2011	Sivapuram		
2011	Bombay Mittayi		
2011	Kudumbasree Travels	Khadeeja	
2011	Makeup Man	Soorya's fiancée's aunt	
2011	Indian Rupee	Mary	
2012	Thanichalla Njan	Razia Beevi	
2012	Spirit	Pankajam	
2012	Vaadhyar	Shobha	
2012	Ezham Suryan	Nalini	
2012	Grihanathan		
2012	Theruvu Nakshatrangal	Advocate	
2012	Mullassery Madhavan Kutty Nemom P. O.	Maria	
2013	ABCD: American-Born Confused Desi (2013 film)	Mariyamma	
2013	Teens	Nun/College authority	
2013	Radio		
2014	Karnavar	Santha	
2014	The Dolphins	Vava	
2014	Nayana	Nurse	
2014	Malayalakkara Residency	Malu	
2014	Bangalore Days	Kuttan's mother (Amma)	
2015	Aana Mayil Ottakam		
2015	Ishtamanu Pakshe Achananu Preshnam		
2015	Charlie	Queen Mary / Mariya	
2015	3 Wikkattinu 365 Runs	Kanakavalli	
2015	Lavender	Janet	
2015	Ennum Eppozhum	Bindhu	
2015	Manam Thelinjathu		
2015	Ente Sathyanweshana Pareekshakal		
2019	Aakasha Ganga 2	Aaveshananda Swamigal	Photo only
2021	Anugraheethan Antony	Thresia Varghese	Photo only
2022	19(1)(a)	Gangettan's wife	Photo only
2025	Thudarum	George's wife	Photo only

=== Tamil ===
List of Kalpana Tamil film credits
Year	Movie	Role	Notes
1985	Chinna Veedu	Bhagyalakshmi	
1986	Thalaiyatti Bommaigal	Saradha	
1987	Thirumathi Oru Vegumathi	Uma	
1991	Mookuthi Poo Meley		
1994	Sindhu Nathi Poo	Shenbaga Valli	
1994	Ipadikku Kaadhal	Lilly	
1995	Sathi Leelavathi	Leelavathi	
1997	Poochudava	Arul, Kannan's sister	
2001	Chithiram		
2001	Looty	Sona	
2001	Dumm Dumm Dumm	Pattamma	
2001	Veettoda Mappillai	Jamuna	
2002	Pammal K. Sambandam	Nurse Mariyakutty	
2003	Aalukkoru Aasai	Govindamma	
2005	Idhaya Thirudan	Kamala	
2006	Kasu		
2007	Arputha Theevu	Mallika	
2009	Sirithal Rasipen	Eshwari	
2015	Kaaki Sattai	Meenakshi	
2016	Thozha	Lakshmi	
2017	Kadhal Kasakuthaiya	Arjun's mother	
2017	Vaigai Express	N/A; Voice for Anuradha (Archana Chandhoke)	
2018	Itly	Lilly	

=== Kannada ===
List of Kalpana Kannada film credits
Year	Movie	Role
1990	Chapala Chennigaraya	Rukku

=== Telugu ===
List of Kalpana Telugu film credits
Year	Movie	Role
2016	Oopiri	Lakshmi
2019	Majili	Poorna's Mother (″Photo appearance″)

== Albums ==
- Palavattam

== Television ==
=== Malayalam television ===
Serials

- Vamsham (DD Malayalam)
- Sathi Leelavathi (Amrita TV)
- Kudumbasametham Manikutty (Jaihind TV)
- Kochu Thresya Kochu (Kairali TV)
- Hukka Huvva Mikkado (Kairali TV)
- Jagapoga (Kairali TV)
- Aathma (Kairali TV)
- In Panchali House (Surya TV)
- Hello Machambi
- Women's Club
- Irattavalan Kurup

As Host

- Ponkireedam (Jaihind TV)
- Manaporutham (Asianet)
- Star Singer (Asianet)
- Run Baby Run (Asianet Plus)
- Amrita Onam (Amrita TV)
- Onakinnaram (Surya TV)
- Payasaperumma (Jeevan TV)
- Vellithirayile Ambilikala (Kairali TV)
- Kalpana Show 2006 (DD Malayalam)
- The Kalpana Show 2002 (Asianet)
- Apratheekshitha Athithi : Ee Onam Ivarodoppam (Asianet)
- Only Ministers (Jaihind TV)
- Golden Moments
- K P Ummer Interview
- Mukesh.com Mega Show

Other shows

- Smart Show (Flowers)
- Comedy Super Nite (Flowers)
- Tharapakittu (Kaumudy TV)
- Cinema Company (Kaumudy TV)
- Deal or No Deal (Surya TV)
- Hairomax Mrs. Kerala (Surya TV)
- Suryathejassod Amma (Surya TV)
- Suryaprabhayil Priyatharangal (Surya TV)
- Kitchen Tharangal (Surya TV)
- Super Dancer Junior (Amrita TV)
- Annie's Kitchen (Amrita TV)
- Malayali Durbar (Amrita TV)
- Vanitharatnam (Amrita TV)
- Star Family (Amrita TV)
- Ningalkkum Aakaam Kodeeshwaran(Asianet)
- Sarigama (Asianet)
- Saregamapadhanisa (Asianet)
- Idea Star Singer (Asianet)
- Sell Me The Answer (Asianet)
- Badai Bungalow (Asianet)
- Comedy Stars (Asianet)
- Smile Plz (Asianet Plus)
- Thiranottam (ACV)
- Ruchibhedam (ACV)
- Kerala's Favourite Film Actor (ACV)
- On Record (Asianet News)
- Onnum Onnum Moonu (Mazhavil Manorama)
- Cinema Chirima (Mazhavil Manorama)
- Idavelayil (Mazhavil Manorama)
- Katha Ithuvare (Mazhavil Manorama)
- Aniyarayil (Mazhavil Manorama)
- Nere Chovve (Manorama News)
- Veedu (Manorama News)
- Pachakuthira (Kairali TV)
- Star Wars (Kairali TV)
- Veettamma (Kairali TV)
- Chirikkum Pattanam (Kairali TV)
- JB Junction (Kairali TV)
- Students Only (Kairali TV)
- Jagapoga (Kairali TV)
- Love Bites (Kairali We)
- Ammayiyamma Marumakal Contest (Jaihind TV)
- Jeevitham Ithuvare (Jaihind TV)
- Ammaykku Oru Umma (Jaihind TV)
- Ini Njangal Parayam (DD Malayalam)
- 2 Crore Apple Mega Star (Jeevan TV)
- Karunaniravil Kalpana
- Mukhamukham Kalpana
- Onam in Singapore
- Crossroads
- Tharaprabha
- Asiavision
- Lux Asianet
- Asianet Television Awards
- Jaycey Awards
- Kerala Kaumudi Onam Celebrations 2009
- Malayalam Super Star Nite 1987
- Arabian Dreams
- Mazhavilazhakil Amma
- Special Athithi
- Kairali Cultural Association's Onam
- Asianet Film Awards
- Kerala Kalotsavam
- Kerala Tourism Onam Celebrations
- Siddique Lal's Cine Galaxy 94
- Rhythm 92

=== Tamil television ===
Serials

- Chinna Papa Periya Papa Season 2 (Sun TV) as China Papa
- Abirami (Kalaignar TV) as Kusalam
- Thangam (Sun TV) (guest role) as Kuchalambal
- Mama Maaple (Sun TV) as Parimalam
- Kathiravan (Sun TV) as Janu
