= Nazario (given name) =

Nazario is a masculine given name. It is a Hispanic variant of Nazar, Nazer, Nazaire, Nazari or Nazarius. The name may refer to the following people:

- Nazario Belmar (1919–1980), Spanish footballer, producer and lawyer
- Nazario Benavídez (1802–1858), Argentine general
- Nazario Carlo Bellandi (1919–2010), Italian music composer, organist, pianist and harpsichordist
- Nazario Chávez Aliaga (1891–1978), Peruvian journalist, politician and poet
- Nazario Escoto, President of Nicaragua
- Nazario Fiakaifonu (born 1988), Vanuatuan judoka
- Nazario Herrera Ortega (born 1964), Mexican politician
- Nazario Moreno González (1970–2014), Mexican drug lord
- Nazario Nazari (1724–1793), Italian painter
- Nazario Norberto Sánchez (born 1956), Mexican politician
- Nazario Padrón (born 1945), Spanish swimmer
- Nazario Pagano (born 1957), Italian politician
- Nazario Sauro (1880–1916), Austrian-born Italian irredentist and sailor
- Nazario Toledo (1807–1887), Costa Rican politician
