= Mattupetti Machan =

1998 Indian film by Jose Thomas

Mattupetty Machan
- Directed by: Jose Thomas
- Screenplay by: Udaykrishna–Sibi K. Thomas
- Story by: Rajan Kiriyath; Vinu Kiriyath
- Produced by: Gopikrishnan; Vinu Kiriyath; Kannan Nair
- Starring: Mukesh; Baiju Santhosh; Jagathy Sreekumar; Oduvil Unnikrishnan; Kalabhavan Navas; Sreelakshmi; Maathu
- Cinematography: Sree Shankar
- Edited by: K. Rajagopal
- Music by: C. Thankaraj
- Production company: Gopurachithra Films
- Distributed by: Gopurachithra Films Release
- Release date: 1998
- Running time: 136 minutes
- Country: India
- Language: Malayalam

Mattupetty Machan is a 1998 Indian Malayalam language comedy film directed by Jose Thomas and written by Udaykrishna–Sibi K. Thomas. It has an ensemble cast including Mukesh, Baiju Santhosh, Jagathy Sreekumar, Oduvil Unnikrishnan, Kalabhavan Navas, Sreelakshmi and Maathu. The film was a commercial success at the box office. It was remade in Tamil as Banda Paramasivam, in Telugu as Hungama and in Hindi as Housefull 2.

== Synopsis ==
Kumar Kubera and Prabhakara Prabhu are former friends, business rivals and bitter enemies. They want to outdo each other in everything, especially when it comes to marrying off their daughters. Manoharan, a marriage broker brings them many good suitors for their daughters, but Kubera and Prabhu are hellbent on not letting the other's daughter get married first.

One day, Manoharan brings a Middle Eastern NRI to see Prabhu's daughter. He works in Oman, but Prabhu finds him unsuitable, assaults and insults him, his family and Manoharan. He vows to take revenge and marry off Prabhu's daughter to the most unsuitable man in the land, with conditions saying that the man should be very poor, savage and an orphan. He enlists Manoharan's help to find such a suitor and Manoharan introduces him to Mattupetti Machan, a notorious coolie in the local market. Kannappan is the rival faction leader and the two often lock horns over unloading work.

== Cast ==
- Mukesh as Balakrishnan a.k.a. Mattupetti Machan
- Baiju Santhosh as Kannappan/Kannan
- Jagathy Sreekumar as Kumar Kubera/Kumaran
- Oduvil Unnikrishnan as Prabhakara Prabhu/Prabhakaran
- Kalabhavan Navas as Unnikrishnan
- Captain Raju as Mattupetti Mahadevan
- Sreelakshmi as Lakshmi Kubera
- Maathu as Parvathy Prabhu
- Salim Kumar as Manoharan
- Kottayam Nazir as "Achuthan"
- Bobby Kottarakkara as Velu
- Kochu Preman as Industries Minister Sankarankutty (Cameo role)
- Tony as Rajappan
- Kanakalatha as Prabhakara prabhu's wife
- Sonia as Chenthamara
- Lissy Jose as Mattuppetty Mahadevan's Wife
- Udaykrishna as Driver Kusulapi, Achuthan's driver
- Vijayakumar as Police Officer

== Songs ==
The songs in the movie were written by Bichu Thirumala and composed by Thankaraj. The BGM was done by Rajamani. This was the debut film for Thankaraj.

- "Chillu Janalinte Arikil" - M. G. Sreekumar, K. S. Chithra
- "Rasa Thaan Daa" - M. G. Sreekumar
- "Kadukodachu" - M. G. Sreekumar, K. S. Chithra
