= Kudumba Vaarthakal =

- Directed by: Ali Akbar
- Written by: V. C. Ashok
- Produced by: Milan Jaleel
- Starring: Jagadish; Jagathy Sreekumar; Innocent; Kalabhavan Mani; Kalpana
- Music by: Berny-Ignatius
- Production company: Chandrakala Films
- Distributed by: Chandrakala Films
- Release date: 8 January 1998
- Country: India
- Language: Malayalam

Kudumba Vaarthakal (transl. Family news) is a 1998 Indian Malayalam-language comedy film directed by Ali Akbar and produced by Milan Jaleel. The film stars Jagadish, Jagathy Sreekumar, Innocent, Kalabhavan Mani and Kalpana in the lead roles. The film has musical score by Berny-Ignatius. Songs are written by S. Ramesan Nair

== Cast ==
- Jagadish as Devadas
- Rehana Navas as Parvathy Nair
- Jagathy Sreekumar as Govindan
- Innocent as Ambu Nair/Devadas
- Kalabhavan Mani as Lonayi
- Kalpana as Meera Govindan
- Manka Mahesh as Pathmakshi
- Sadiq as Narendran
- Salim Kumar as Kunjumon
- Adoor Pankajam as Nani Amma

== Soundtrack ==
The music was composed by Berny-Ignatius and the lyrics were written by S. Ramesan Nair.

No.	Song	Singers	Lyrics	Length (m:ss)
1	"Dukha Swapnangale Nithya Sathyangale"	Biju Narayanan	S. Ramesan Nair	
2	"Dukha Swapnangale Nithya Sathyangale"	Sangeetha	S. Ramesan Nair	
3	"Ponnnusha Kanyake"	Sangeetha	S. Ramesan Nair	
4	"Ponvilakkenthum"	K. J. Yesudas	S. Ramesan Nair	
5	"Thankamani Thaamarayaay"	Biju Narayanan, Chithra Iyer	S. Ramesan Nair	
6	"Thiruvaanikkaavum"	Sangeetha	S. Ramesan Nair	
