= Gramapanchayath (film) =

1998 film directed by Ali Akbar

Graama Panchaayathu
- Directed by: Ali Akbar
- Screenplay by: Benny P. Nayarambalam
- Produced by: Shemeer Thukalil; Kukku
- Starring: Jagadish; Rajan P. Dev
- Cinematography: Madhu Adoor
- Edited by: G. Murali
- Music by: Berny-Ignatious
- Production company: SM Creations
- Distributed by: Kokers Films; Anupama; Evershine
- Release date: 1998
- Country: India
- Language: Malayalam

Graama Panchaayathu is a 1998 Indian Malayalam-language comedy-drama film directed by Ali Akbar and written by Benny P. Nayarambalam, starring Jagadish and Rajan P. Dev in the lead roles. It was a commercial success at the box-office.

== Plot ==
Two persons lifelong friendship takes a sour turn when one of them wins a court case and gets a hefty settlement. After this he considers his friend, who is a barber, to be of lower stature and goes back on his word to marry his daughter to his friend's son whom he now considers to be worthless as he has no job and is a barber's son. How the barber's son tries to woo and marry her despite her fathers resistance.

== Cast ==
- Jagadish as Chakrapani
- Rajan P. Dev as Pappu
- Jagathy Sreekumar as R.A. Japan/Rajappan
- NF Varghese as Gunasekharan
- Kaveri as Sunanda
- Kalpana as Pankajakshi
- Harishree Ashokan as Swa.Le
- Indrans as Bhaskaran
- Salim Kumar as Njandu
- Zeenath as Santha
- Sagar Shiyas as Bhargavan, a look alike of Rajanikanth
- Jayasurya as Bus conductor (junior artist)

== In popular culture ==
Jagathy Sreekumars character R.A. Japan (the stylish name which he would refer himself as), originally Rajappan, a self proclaimed modern barber who was brought by Gunasekharan to destroy his once good friend's barber shop, was immensely popular among the masses.Later it was used similarly in the film Njan Prakashan Fahad Fazils character P.R Akash, he changes his name from Prakashan to P.R Akash.
