= 1921: Puzha Muthal Puzha Vare =

2023 Indian film

- Theatrical release poster
- Directed by: Ramasimhan
- Written by: Ramasimhan
- Produced by: Ali Akbar
- Starring: Thalaivasal Vijay; R. L. V. Ramakrishnan
- Cinematography: Binu S. Nair; Sunil Kannur; Prajeesh Kannur
- Edited by: Ramasimhan
- Music by: Hari Venugopal; Jagathlal Chandrasekhar
- Production company: Mamadharma Productions
- Distributed by: Mamadharma Release
- Release dates: 13 August 2022 (Delhi); 3 March 2023 (India)
- Running time: 190 minutes
- Country: India
- Language: Malayalam
- Budget: 2.5 Crore

1921: Puzha Muthal Puzha Vare (transl. 1921: From River To River) is a 2022 Indian Malayalam-language period film written, produced, edited, and directed by Ramasimhan. It is based on the 1921 Malabar riots. The film depicts the accused religious persecution of Hindus spearheaded by Variyankunnath Kunjahammad Haji. The film stars Thalaivasal Vijay, R. L. V. Ramakrishnan, Joy Mathew, Dinesh Panicker, Vijay Menon, Santhosh K. Nayar, Kozhikode Narayanan Nair, Agna Suresh, and Kenas Mathew George.

Produced on a limited budget, capital for the film was sourced through crowdfunding. 1921: Puzha Muthal Puzha Vare was premiered at Delhi on 13 August 2022. The film was theatrically released in India on 3 March 2023.

== Cast ==
- Thalaivasal Vijay as Variyankunnath Kunjahammad Haji
- R. L. V. Ramakrishnan as Chathan
- Joy Mathew
- Krishnapriya as Naani (Thozhi)
- Santhosh T Nair as Driver
- Dinesh Panicker as Collector
- Vijay Menon as Aamu
- Santhosh K. Nayar as Abdullakutty
- Kozhikode Narayanan Nair as Chekutty Sahib
- Agna Suresh as Savithri
- Kenas Mathew George as Hitchcock
- Shobi Thilakan as Lavankutty
- Shibu Thilakan as Kunjalavi
- Sreejith Kaiveli as Mammad
- Santhosh Saras as Madhavan Nair
- Mohammed Eravattoor as Ali Musliyar
- J. P. Athavanad as Moideen Haji
- Krishna Prasad
- Vinodh Kavil as Vishnu Namboothiri
- Madhulal as Noonan

== Production ==
=== Development ===
In 2020, a film on Variyankunnath Kunjahammad Haji was announced by Ali Akbar (later rechristened as Ramasimhan) in the centenary year of Malabar rebellion of 1921. Capital for the film was sourced through crowdfunding from public. Ramahimhan said he based the incidents in the screenplay from books about Malabar riots by K. Madhavan Nair, Appu Nedungadi, and also from The Mopla Rebellion, 1921 by C. Gopalan Nair, the then Deputy Collector of Malabar. He was prompted to do the film after director Aashiq Abu and actor Prithviraj Sukumaran announced a film about Variyankunnath Kunjahammad Haji depicting him as a heroic figure.

=== Filming ===
Principal photography began on 20 February 2021 in Wayanad. Beside, the film was shot in Palakkad, interior scenes shot in Kozhikode, Nilambur, and kovilakam scenes in Manjeri. In September 2021, Ramasimhan said that they have raised ₹1.5 crore through crowdfunding and the film's budget is ₹3 crore and 60 percent of the filming has bee completed by then. Shooting was then postponed due to the COVID-19 pandemic crisis. By that time, Abu and Prithviraj had already backed out from their project.

== Soundtrack ==
The film's music was composed by Hari Venugopal and Jagathlal Chandrasekhar, with lyrics by Ramasimhan.

No.	Title	Length
1.	"Idanenjil Kortha Novin"	5:47

== Release ==
1921: Puzha Muthal Puzha Vare was premiered on 13 August 2022 at Delhi. The film was theatrically released in India on 3 March 2023.

=== Censoring issues ===
The film was submitted for certification at the regional office of Central Board of Film Certification in Kerala in May 2022. Three of its examination committee members recommended denial of certificate citing it contains "visuals as well as dialogues which are likely to endanger public order", while two other members recommended issuing UA certificate ("unrestricted public exhibition" with parental guidance for children below 12 years). The chairman denied certification and sent it to a revising committee in Mumbai. The revising committee, by majority decision, recommended issuing an adults-only A certificate with seven cuts. This committee also had a historian from the Indian Council of Historical Research. Nevertheless, the chairman send the film to a second revising committee which unanimously agreed on issuing an A certificate, but with 12 cuts. This prompted Ramasimhan to approach the Kerala High Court challenging the chairman's decision to send the film to a second revising committee which is against the scope of his powers and law. In December 2022, the court ruled in favour of Ramasimhan, noting that the chairman's decision was illegal and goes against the Cinematograph Act, 1952 and the Cinematograph (Certification) Rules, 1983. The film was granted certificate as per the first revising committee's report. Ramasimhan said that "when a historical riot is depicted, there will be bloodshed. It cannot be avoided. That is why the film got A certificate".
