= Ramasimhan =

Film director (born 1953)

Ramasimhan Aboobakker
- Born: Ali Akbar Aboobakker; 20 February 1953 (age 73); Meenangadi, Wayanad, Kerala
- Other name: Mamadarman
- Occupations: Director; screenwriter; lyricist; editor
- Years active: 1980 – present
- Spouse: Amminiyamma
- Children: 4
- Awards: Thekkedatthamma Award 2026

Ramasimhan Aboobakker (born Ali Akbar Aboobakker; 20 February 1953), formerly credited as Ali Akbar, is an Kerala film director, screenwriter, editor, and lyricist who works in Malayalam cinema. He has had directed more than 5 Malayalam films. He is mostly known for directing comedy-drama films, such as Junior Mandrake, Gramapanchayath, Kudumba Vaarthakal, and Bamboo Boys.

He won the Kerala State Film Award for Best Director for his debut film Bamboo Boys (2002), and the National Film Award for Best Educational/Motivational/Instructional Film for Rabia Chalikkunnu (1996). He was professionally credited as Ali Akbar until 2021. In 2021, he left Islam and started practising Hinduism, he changed his name to Ramasimhan.

== Early life ==
He was born in a Mappila Muslim family in Meenangadi in Kerala, India, on 20 February 1963.

== Film career ==
Ramasimhan made his directorial debut with the 1988 Malayalam film Mamalakalkkappurathu, for which he won the Kerala State Film Award for Best Debut Director that year. In 1995, he directed Pai Brothers, a comedy-drama starring Innocent and Jagathy Sreekumar as two entrepreneurs entrapped in a love triangle. His 1997 comedy film Junior Mandrake is one of his best known works, starring Jagadish and Jagathy Sreekumar. It was based on the bust of Junior Mandake which is believed to be a jinx. The film was a commercial success. In 2002, he directed another comedy film, Bamboo Boys, about four tribal men who come out of jungle on a quest to find a doctor in the city.

His 1996 drama film Rabia Chalikkunnu won the National Film Award for Best Educational/Motivational/Instructional Film at the 44th National Film Awards. It was followed by comedy-drama films Gramapanchayath (1998), Kudumba Vaarthakal (1998) and Swastham Grihabharanam (1999). His directorial Senior Mandrake (2010), a sequel to Junior Mandrake, received unfavourable reviews. In 2011, he was banned by FEFKA for associating with acot Thilakan and directing the film Achan with him in the lead role. In 2012, he directed Ideal Couple.

In 2020, Ramasimhan announced a film on Variyankunnath Kunjahammad Haji, which was produced through crowdfunding, titled 1921: Puzha Muthal Puzha Vare, based on the 1921 Malabar rebellion. The film was released in March 2023.

== Personal life ==
Ramasimhan is married to Amminiyamma and the couple has two daughters and two sons.

=== Religion ===
In 2015, Ramasimhan said that he was a victim of child sexual abuse as he was abused by an ustad (teacher) at his madrasa at Meenangadi when he was eight years old. In December 2021, Ramasimhan announced that he was renouncing Islam and he and his wife have decided to convert to Hinduism, and has changed his name to Ramasimhan. He said the decision came after seeing disrespectful reactions by many Muslims who put laughing emoji to the news about the accidental death in a helicopter crash of then-Chief of Defence Staff Bipin Rawat.

=== Politics ===
Ramasimhan was an Kerala Students Union (KSU) leader during his school days. After that, he stayed away from politics for a long period. In 2014, Ramasimhan contested in the 2014 Indian general election from Vatakara Lok Sabha constituency as an Aam Aadmi Party (AAP) candidate. But lost to Mullappally Ramachandran. He left AAP within 15 days after election, alleging he found evidence for financial corruption within the party in Kerala. He said he also communicated the matter with Sarah Joseph who also left the party. In 2016, he contested in the 2016 Kerala Legislative Assembly election from Koduvally constituency as a Bharatiya Janata Party (BJP) candidate. But lost to Karat Razak. In 2021, he resigned from BJP state committee, citing discontent to the party's then state leadership.

== Filmography ==
Directed films
Year	Title	Writer	Lyricist	Other	Notes
1988	Maamalakalkkappurath	Yes	Yes		
1992	Mukhamudra				
1993	Ponnuchaami				
1995	Pai Brothers	Yes			
1997	Junior Mandrake		Yes		
1998	Gramapanchayath				Cameo appearance
1998	Kudumba Vaarthakal				
1999	Swastham Grihabharanam				
2002	Bamboo Boys	Yes	Yes		
2010	Senior Mandrake	Yes	Yes	Yes	Also editor
2011	Achan		Yes	Yes	Also editor and cinematographer
2012	Ideal Couple	Yes	Yes	Yes	Also editor
2023	1921: Puzha Muthal Puzha Vare -Mamadarma Funding	Yes	Yes	Yes	Also editor, producer, and stunt choreographer

== Awards ==
- 1988 - Kerala State Film Award for Best Debut Director - Maamalakalkkappurath
- 1996 - 44th National Film Award for Best Educational/Motivational/Instructional Film - Rabia Chalikkunnu
