= Nazario (surname) =

Nazario or Nazário is a Portuguese: from the personal name Nazario, from the Late Latin personal name Nazarius ‘of Nazareth’, referring to Jesus of Nazareth. . Notable people with the surname include:

- Abel Nazario (born 1970), Puerto Rican senator
- Andrey Nazário Afonso (born 1983), Brazilian footballer
- Bruno Nazário (born 1995), Brazilian footballer
- Carlos Nazario (born 1958), Puerto Rican swimmer
- Clemente Ruiz Nazario (1896–1969), Puerto Rican judge
- Ednita Nazario (born 1955), Puerto Rican musician, singer, songwriter and actress
- Jose Luis Nazario, Jr. (born 1980), United States Marine
- Juan Nazario (born 1963), Puerto Rican boxer
- Lelo Nazario, Brazilian composer, arranger, pianist, producer and musical director
- Maritza Meléndez Nazario, Puerto Rican politician
- Minita Chico-Nazario (born 1939), Associate Justice of the Supreme Court of the Philippines
- Naydi Nazario (born 1956), Puerto Rican long-distance runner
- Rafael Nazario (born 1952), Puerto Rican-born pianist, composer and actor
- Ronaldo Nazário (born 1976), Brazilian footballer
- Sonia Nazario (born 1960), American journalist
- Thomas Nazario (born 1949), American attorney, author and children's rights advocate
