= Nazer =

Nazer is a surname. Notable people with the surname include:

- Gamal El-Nazer (1930–2006), Egyptian water polo player
- Hassan Nazer, British-Iranian film director
- Hisham Nazer (1932–2015), Saudi Arabian writer and diplomat
- Mende Nazer (born c. 1982), Sudanese writer and activist

== See also ==
- Nader
