= Rajeev Govindan =

Indian writer, lyricist and film producer

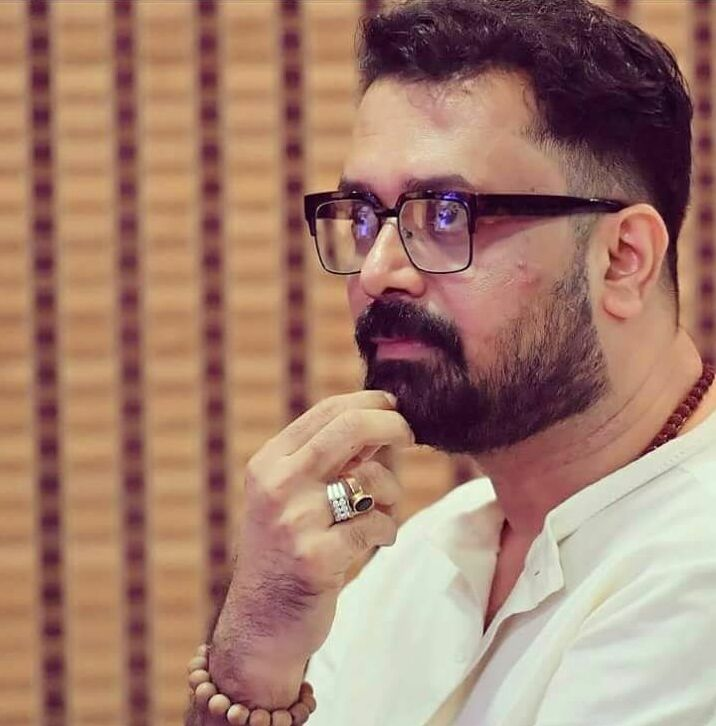
- Born: 2 October 1972 (age 53); Angadipuram, Malappuram, Kerala, India
- Other name: Rajeev Nair
- Occupations: Lyricist; Film producer; Entrepreneur
- Years active: 2003–present

Rajeev Govindan (born 2 October 1972), formerly known as Rajeev Nair, is an Indian writer, lyricist and producer known for his works in the Malayalam film industry. He is a civil engineer by profession.

His noted works include Ordinary and Trivandrum Lodge. His first production venture under the banner of Magic Moon Productions was Malayalam film Ordinary directed by Sugeeth. His next production was the Prithviraj Sukumaran starring film Anarkali which was directed by Sachy. He is also a member of the Indian Screenwriters Association (ISA).

== Early career ==
A civil engineer by profession, he established an entrepreneurial venture, Hydrotech Systems Pvt. Ltd. in August 2009. The company specializes in ocean engineering and offshore engineering with an emphasis on underwater operations.

He began as a lyricist with devotional songs from 2003. His early works include singer Biju Narayanan’s Lord Ayyapa devotional songs "Makara Nilavu" which was released by His Master's Voice. Another work was the devotional album Krishna Priyan. He worked with music director P. K. Reghu Kumar on Varumo Vasantham (2008) brought out by Sathyam Audios. His teamwork with Iype Mathew, Bibin Mathew Abraham & director Sugeeth for the Musical Video Album Keralam provided his entry into film production. He also wrote lyrics for the album Hare (2014), composed by Sreevalsan J Menon.

== Film career ==
=== Lyricist ===
His career as a lyricist in the Malayalam Film Industry began with the film Race (2011). Though he had written for the Jayasurya starrer Vaadhyar (2012), his debut production venture Ordinary (2012) was released first. His work for the film remains the most noticed in his career. His other work includes Trivandrum Lodge (2012), "Erunottam Ithenthinu Veruthe" from the movie Chettayees (2012), 3 Dots (2013) and the songs from the surprise hit Vellimoonga (2014). He also wrote the lyrics for Peruchazhi (2014), Picket 43 (2015), 100 days of Love, Haram (2015) and Careful (2017). His upcoming projects for 2018 are Kaaliyan and Kinavallikal.

=== Producer ===
His first production venture under the banner of Magic Moon Productions was the Malayalam film Ordinary (2012) directed by Sugeeth. The movie starring an ensemble cast including Kunchako Boban, Biju Menon and Ann Augustine was a success and one of the highest grossers of the year. The movie witnessed the upcoming of a new tourist destination Gavi, Pathanamthitta and the introduction of the new comic team of Kunchako Boban and Biju Menon. He produced the romantic movie Anarkali starring Prithviraj Sukumaran which was also the directorial debut of the writer Sachy.

Rajeev Govindan's (previously known as Rajeev Nair) poetry collection Thimirakanthi, published by D.C. Books was released on 5 November 2017.

== Awards ==
- New Mumbai cultural center award for the best lyricist in various films in 2018.
- Mumbai Tharangini Award, 2018 Best producer and lyricist for Anarkali.
- Eco Friendly Film Awards, 2013- Ordinary, Producer Rajeev Nair.
- Cinema Scapes, 2012- Ordinary, Award for Best feature film other than Hindi.

== Filmography ==
As producer

Year	Title	Cast
2012	Ordinary	Kunchacko Boban, Shritha Sivadas, Biju Menon
2015	Anarkali	Prithviraj Sukumaran, Biju Menon, Kabir Bedi
2028	Kaaliyan	Prithviraj Sukumaran, Sathyaraj

As lyricist

Year	Title	Composer
2026	Magic Mushrooms	Nadirshah
2024	Kadha Innuvare	Ashwin Aryan
2024	Anand Sreebala	Ranjin Raj
2023	Salaar: Part 1 – Ceasefire	Ravi Basrur
2023	Kabzaa	Ravi Basrur
2022	Thattassery koottam	Raam sarath
2022	Aaraattu	Rahul Raj
2018	Praana	Louiz Banks
2018	Kinavalli	Shashwath
2018	Kalyanam	Prakash Alex
2017	Careful	Aravind–Shankar
2015	Anarkali	Vidyasagar
2015	Loham (1 Song)	Sreevalsan J Menon
2015	Madhura Naranga	Sreejith–Saachin(Yuvvh)
2015	Haram	Thaikkudam Bridge
2015	Picket 43	Ratheesh Vegha
2014	Vellimoonga	Bijibal
2014	Peruchazhi	Arrorra
2014	Polytechnic	Gopi Sunder
2013	3 Dots	Vidyasagar
2012	Chettayees	Deepak Dev
2012	916 (1 Song)	M. Jayachandran
2012	Trivandrum Lodge (2 Songs)	M. Jayachandran
2012	Vaadhyar	R.Gautham, Manoj George
2012	Ordinary	Vidyasagar
2011	Race	Viswajith
