= Madhu Wariar =

Indian actor

Madhu Warrier
- Born: 5 July 1976 (age 50); Nagercoil, Tamil Nadu, India
- Education: Sainik School Kazhakootam
- Occupations: Film director; actor; film producer; entrepreneur
- Years active: 2004–present
- Relatives: Manju Warrier (sister)

Madhu Warrier (born 5 July 1976), professionally credited as Madhu Wariar, is a retired Indian actor known for his roles in Malayalam films, who now works as a director and producer. He produced the films Swantham Lekhakan (2009) and Mayamohini (2012). He directed the film Lalitham Sundaram, which was released in 2022.

== Family and early life ==
Born in Nagercoil, Tamil Nadu, he is the son of Madhava Warrier, an accountant, and Girija Warrier, a housewife. He is the elder brother of actress Manju Warrier. His family hails from Pullu, Thrissur.

== Career ==
Wariar made his acting debut with a lead role in the Malayalam film The Campus. Since then, he has acted in over 20 films.

Wariar and filmmaker P. Sukumar own a production house named Color Factory. He has produced two films, Swantham Lekhakan and Mayamohini. He directed the film Lalitham Sundaram.

== Filmography ==
Year	Title	Role	Notes
2004	Wanted	Unni	
2004	Parayam	Arjun Menon	
2005	The Campus	Rajiv Menon	
2005	Nerariyan CBI	Pradeep	
2005	Bharathchandran I.P.S.	Anwar	
2005	Immini Nalloraal	Rahul	
2005	Iruvattam Manavaatti	Hareendran	
2005	Ponmudipuzhayorathu	Kumaran	
2006	Ravanan	Rajeev Ariyar	
2007	Romeo	Manuel	
2007	Hallo	Susheel Bhai	
2007	Pranayakalam	Anand	
2007	The Speed Track	Rahul	
2007	Detective	Basheer	
2007	Anchil Oral Arjunan	Vinayan	
2008	Twenty:20	Rajanikanth	
2008	Kerala Police		
2008	Kanal Kannaadi		
2008	Chandranilekkulla Vazhi		
2008	SMS	Raj Mohan	
2008	Crazy Gopalan	Sooraj	
2008	Veruthe Oru Bharya	Rameshan	
2009	Swantham Lekhakan	Dr. Ram Kumar	
2009	Malayali	Ramesan	
2009	Patham Adhyayam	Niyas	
2011	Kanakompathu		
2012	Mayamohini	Anwar IPS	Also producer
2022	Lalitham Sundaram		Director
2025	Sarvam Maya		
