= Saivar Thirumeni =

2001 film by Shajoon Karyal

- Directed by: Shajoon Karyal
- Written by: Robin Thirumala
- Produced by: Nahas
- Starring: Suresh Gopi; Manoj K. Jayan
- Cinematography: P. Sukumar
- Edited by: Ranjan Abraham
- Music by: Songs: Raveendran; Score: Rajamani
- Distributed by: Punchiri Creations
- Release date: 2001
- Running time: 160 minutes
- Country: India
- Language: Malayalam

Saivar Thirumeni is a 2001 Indian Malayalam-language action drama film directed by Shajoon Karyal and written by Robin Thirumala. It features Suresh Gopi, Manoj K. Jayan,Samyuktha Varma, Narendra Prasad, Lalu Alex, Jagathy Sreekumar and Janardhanan. The music was composed by Raveendran. The plot revolves around Devadatthan (Suresh Gopi), a Namboothiri youth. This movie is dubbed in Telugu as Dhairyavanthudu and in Hindi as Jung ka maidan.

== Synopsis ==
Mazhamangalath Narayanan Namboothirippadu is the head of a prestigious Mazhamangalam family. His elder son is Mazhamangalath Kunjikuttan, and his younger son is Mazhamangalath Devadathan Namboothirippadu, popularly known as Saivar Thirumeni. His friends are Kunjappu and Neelakandan, who believe Saivar more than anyone else. Saivar looks after their estate at Kunthapuram in Karnataka, and people there call him Saivar Thirumeni, out of respect and love.

One day, Narayanan was honoured by the villagers for winning the Kendra Sahithya Academy Award. One of the elephants, named Ganeshan, turns violent but is calmed down by Saivar. He is appreciated by the villagers for saving the people from the violent pachyderm. Saivar knows from his friend Kunjappu that the elephant was turned violent by their family rivals. Saivar goes to meet them and gives them a final warning.

Later, he goes to church, where he meets his friend Fr. Kuruvithadam along with the orphans. Even as a Brahmin, Saivar looks after the orphans. Saivar sings a melodious Christian song to the orphans. He meets Annie at the church. Annie is the daughter of Fr. Kuruvithadam's brother. Annie has come to that village to learn Kathakali. Saivar's sister Bhaama is also a student at the school. Annie and Saivar quarrel at the beginning. As the story moves forward, Annie learns from Fr. Kuruvithadam that the orphans were looked after by Saivar, which leads her to fall in love with him. She learns more about him from Bhaama.

The next scene shows Saivar meeting his cousin Mithran. Mithran seeks help from Saivar to save him and his friend Sam from Paappachan. Saivar once saved Paappachan from an accident, and they became friends. Mithran cheated Paappa in their business deal, and Saivar was unaware of this. Saivar sets out with Kunjappu and Neelakandan to solve the issue with Paappa. On the way, Paappa's goons attack Mithran, but Saivar fights back and goes to meet Paappa at home. Saivar solves the issue, but Mithran quarrels with Paappachan again, which ends the friendship between Paappa and Saivar. Paappa warns Saivar not to believe Mithran, but he does not want to mistrust his cousin. Mithran's aim is to destroy Saivar's family, as his mother, who was Narayanan's sister, was sent out of their family for loving a man of another caste. Also during their childhood, Saivar caught Mithran stealing their family goddess's statue, which led Mithran to run away. Mithran wanted to avenge this.

He finds a photo of Saivar along with a girl named Sreekutty. This is shown to Narayanan by Mithran, and when asked about it, Saivar lies that he does not know who the girl is. He is beaten up by Narayanan and sent out of the family. This breaks his relationship with Annie. Later, it is proven that Sreekutty was actually Narayanan's daughter, who was born to his lover Martha during Narayanan's youth. Saivar was keeping this a secret as he had given his word to Martha that he would never tell anyone. Saivar kept his word. At the same time, Mithran plays many foul games to destroy the family. He plans to kill Sreekutty and blame Annie's brothers. He kills Kunjikuttan with an elephant. At last, Saivar learns that Mithran was behind the problems. Saivar fights Mithran. Mithran is killed by Kunjikuttan's elephant, and the family is reunited.

== Cast ==
- Suresh Gopi as Mazhamangalath Devadathan Namboothirippadu / Devan / Saivar Thirumeni
- Manoj K. Jayan as Mithran, Devan's Cousin and the main antagonist
- Narendra Prasad as Mazhamangalathu Narayanan Namboothirippadu, Devan's Father
- Jagathy Sreekumar as Mazhamangalath Kunjikuttan, Devan's Elder Brother
- Samyuktha Varma as Annie / Annamma, Devan's Love Interest
- Janardhanan as Father Kuruvithadam, Annie's Uncle
- K. P. A. C. Lalitha as Sreedevi, Devan's Mother
- Nedumudi Venu as Devan's Grandfather
- Lalu Alex as Paappa, Devan's Friend
- Vijayakumar as Thottungal Sam, Devan and Mithran's Friend
- Sangeetha Mohan as Sreekutty, Devan's Stepsister
- Sadiq as Neelakandan, Devan's Friend
- Augustine as Kunjappu, Devan's Friend
- Kalamandalam Kesavan as Kalamandalam Keshavan Namboothirippadu, Devan's Uncle
- Rehana Navas as Bhama, Devan's Younger Sister
- Ramu as Francis, Devan's Friend
- Sanusha as Krishnapriya
- Urmila Unni as Martha
- Subair as Xavier Joseph
- Kundara Johny as Bhaskara Menon
- V. K. Sreeraman as Damodara Menon
- Kozhikode Narayanan Nair as Padmanabhan Nair
- Baburaj as Ayyappan
- Shobha Mohan as Subhadra
- Pavithran as Anto Joseph
- Cherthala Lalitha as Devaki
- Vijayan Peringode as Geevarghese
