= Speed Track =

- Promo-Poster
- Directed by: S. L. Puram Jayasurya
- Written by: S. L. Puram Jayasurya
- Produced by: Subair
- Starring: Dileep; Gajala; Riyaz Khan; Madhu Warrier
- Cinematography: P. Sukumar
- Edited by: Ranjan Abraham
- Music by: Deepak Dev (songs) Ouseppachan (score)
- Production company: Varnachitra Production's
- Distributed by: Varnachitra Release
- Release date: 2 March 2007
- Country: India
- Language: Malayalam

Speed Track is a 2007 Indian Malayalam-language sports drama film written and directed by S. L. Puram Jayasurya (in his directorial debut). It stars Dileep, Gajala (in her Malayalam debut), Riyaz Khan, and Madhu Warrier.

== Plot ==
The movie begins with the selection of new students in BCM College which is famous for sports and athletics. Arjun is a young athlete all set to create history with his speed and spirit. He is going through tough times, mentally and financially following his father's demise. His family badly needs him to keep them going. Arjun joins BCM College for the new academic year, but has some specific tasks and targets on behalf of joining the college.

Everyone on the campus except Tinu, who was the unchallenged hero hailing from a bigger family, welcomed Arjun's talents as he beat Tinu's record in the high jump.

Arjun who makes consistent performances on the track puts Tinu in the back seat and becomes the heartthrob of many within a short time. These defeats were more than something Tinu could handle. He starts to take it on Arjun on a very personal level apart from sporting spirits. This leads to nasty street fights between the two, resulting in the principal calling both of them for talks.

The principal challenges them to take it on the field rather than going at each other. Both prepare to settle the score in the big race that follows. In the end, Anil, Arjun's brother, who is unable to walk, is seen playing basketball.

== Cast ==
- Dileep as Arjun Kumar
- Gajala as Gouri
- Riyaz Khan as Tinu Nalinakshan
- Madhu Warrier as Rahul, Gouri's Brother
- Yadu Krishnan as Hari
- Kalabhavan Prajod as Vinod
- Vishnupriya as Smitha
- Jagathy Sreekumar as K. T. Kunjavara
- Salim Kumar as Lali
- Vijayaraghavan as Chandradas, Gouri's and Rahul's father
- Captain Raju as College Principal
- Niyas Backer as Chakrapani, Tinu's Friend
- Bindu Panicker as M. Treesa
- Arun Kumar as Anil Kumar, Arjun's younger brother
- Ambika Mohan as Arjun's and Anil's mother
- Sai Kumar as Doctor
- Kalaranjini as Gouri's mother
- Ranjith Velayudhan as Sebastian
- Shanavas Shanu as Tinu's friend

== Production ==
Speed Track was first decided to be named Fast Track.

== Soundtrack ==
Gireesh Puthenchery lyrics for the movie,Deepak Dev composed the music for the movie, and Ouseppachan did the background score.

#	Title	Singer(s)
1	"Nerathe Kalathethi"	Deepak Dev, Jassie Gift, George Peter
2	"Ko Ko Ko Kozhi"	Vineeth Sreenivasan, Rimi Tomy
3	"Pattum Padi"	K. J. Yesudas
4	"Oru Kinnaraganam"	Udit Narayan, Sujatha Mohan
5	"Ko Ko Ko Kozhi" (Remix)	Vineeth Sreenivasan, Rimi Tomy, Jyothish

== Release ==
The film was released in theatres on 2 March 2007.
