= Sachy (writer) =

Indian screenwriter (1972–2020)

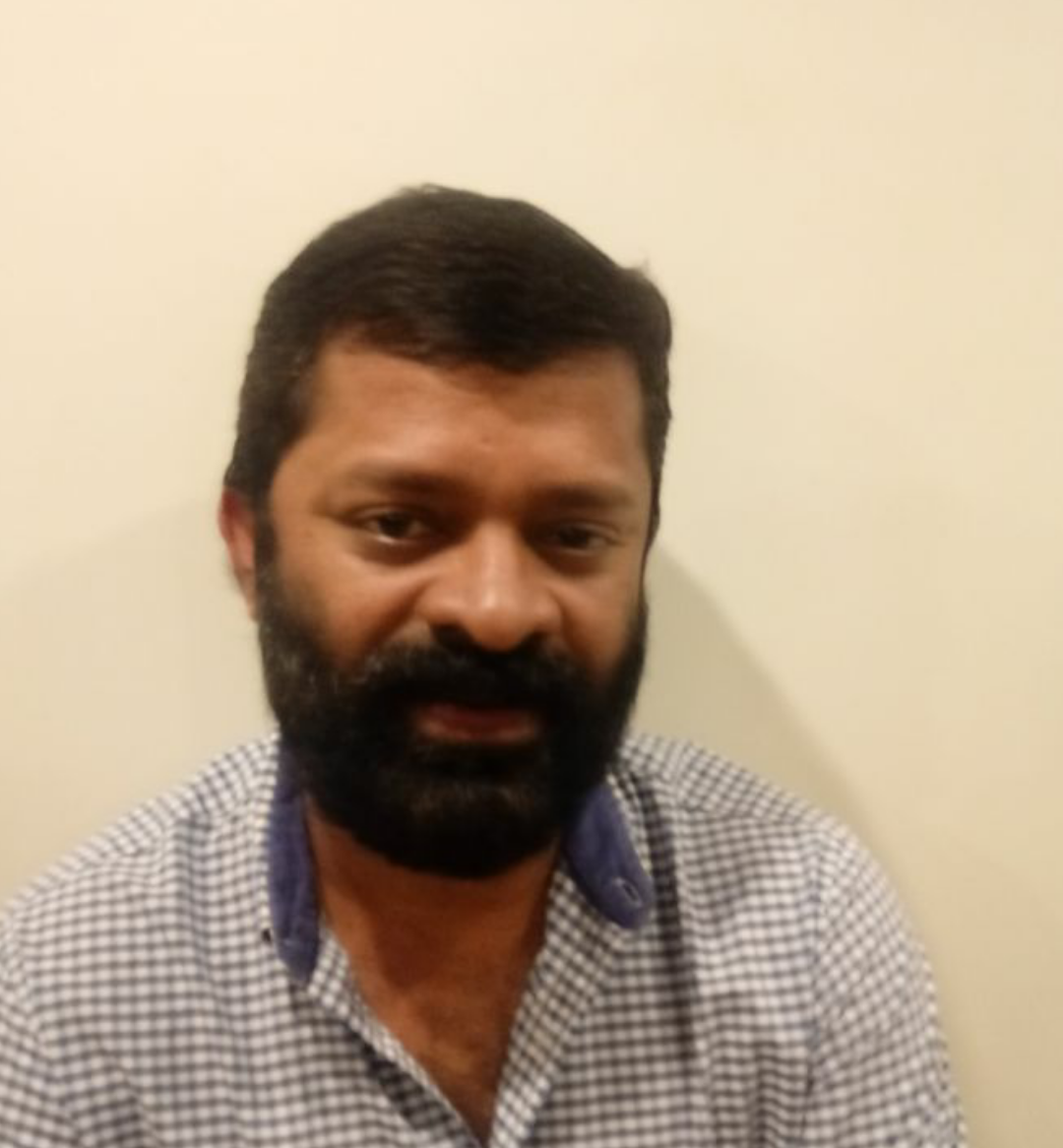
- Born: Koovakattu R. Sachidanandan; 25 December 1972; Kodungallur, Kerala, India
- Died: 18 June 2020 (aged 47); Thrissur, Kerala, India
- Occupations: Advocate; screenwriter; theatre artist; producer; director
- Years active: 1991–2020
- Awards: National Film Award for Best Director (2022)

K. R. Sachidanandan (25 December 1972 – 18 June 2020), professionally credited as Sachy, was an Indian screenwriter, director, and film producer who worked in the Malayalam film industry. Initially, he co-wrote films with Sethu as a writer duo known as Sachi-Sethu, their works include Chocolate (2007), Robinhood (2009), Makeup Man (2011) and Seniors (2011). He made his independent debut as a screenwriter with the 2012 film Run Baby Run and his directorial debut with Anarkali (2015).

He co-produced the film Chettayees (2012) under his company Thakkali Films. It was followed by Ramaleela (2017), Sherlock Toms (2017), and Driving Licence (2019). His last film was Ayyappanum Koshiyum (2020). He died at the age of 47 on 18 June 2020 at Jubilee Mission Hospital in Thrissur. He was posthumously awarded the National Film Award for Best Direction in 2022 for his last film Ayyappanum Koshiyum, which also won three national awards in 2022.

== Early life ==
Sachy was born on 25 December 1972 at Kodungalloor in Thrissur district of Kerala, India. He completed his bachelor's degree in commerce from Sree Narayana Mangalam College, Maliankara and LLB from Govt. Law College, Ernakulam. He practised as a lawyer in Criminal Law and Constitutional Law for eight years in the High Court of Kerala. During his time at college, Sachy was active in his college film society and theatre, directing several plays.

== Film career ==
=== Sachi-Sethu duo ===
He started off his venture in Malayalam Industry by collaborating with writer Sethunath. Their debut movie Chocolate was a success which led them to pair up for several movies. The next work together was Robin Hood which was directed by Joshiy, and later they teamed up for another comedy Makeup Man in 2011 directed by Shafi. They were successful again with comedy-mystery Seniors directed by Vysakh, but the duo split after Doubles (2011) failed to do well at the box office.

=== Independent works ===
After his split with Sethu in 2011, Sachy continued his career as an independent writer, debuting with the thriller Run Baby Run (2012) directed by Joshiy, which became one of the highest-grossing Malayalam films of that year. He later teamed up with director Shajoon Kariyal for Chettayees (2012) starring Biju Menon, Suresh Krishna, Miya and Lal which was not successful at the box office . After Makeup Man Sachy associated with Shafi for the comedy thriller film Sherlock Toms starring Biju Menon which also was a failure. Later, Sachy collaborated with debutant director Arun Gopy for Ramaleela starring Dileep that became a major commercial success at the box office. In 2019, Sachy collaborated with Lal Jr. to make another blockbuster hit Driving License.

=== Production and direction ===
Sachy co-founded the film production company Thakkali Films with his friends Biju Menon, Shajoon Karyal, P. Sukumar and Suresh Krishna, and produced the comedy film Chettayees in 2012. He made his directorial debut with the 2015 romantic drama Anarkali. It starred Prithviraj, Biju Menon, and Mia George. The film received positive reviews from critics and was a commercial success at the box office. It was followed by the action thriller, Ayyappanum Koshiyum, in 2020, for which Sachy received the National Film Award for Best Direction, posthumously. It was a huge blockbuster at the box office, and the last successful Malayalam film, right before the COVID-19 pandemic hit the world. It also led to a remake in Telugu, Bheemla Nayak, starring Pawan Kalyan in Biju's role, and Rana Daggubati in Prithviraj's role. A Tamil language remake is also in the pipeline, rumored to be starring Dhanush and Vijay Sethupathi.

== Death ==
Sachy died on 18 June 2020 following a cardiac arrest at Jubilee Mission Hospital, Thrissur.

== Filmography ==
=== Sachy-Sethu works ===
Year	Movie	Director
2007	Chocolate	Shafi
2009	Robin Hood	Joshiy
2011	Makeup Man	Shafi
2011	Seniors	Vysakh
2011	Doubles	Sohan Seenulal

=== Independent works as writer ===
Year	Movie	Director	Notes
2012	Run Baby Run	Joshiy	Debut film as independent writer
2012	Chettayees	Shajoon Kariyal	Also producer
2015	Anarkali	Himself	Directorial debut
2017	Ramaleela	Arun Gopy	
2017	Sherlock Toms	Shafi	
2019	Driving License	Lal Jr.	
2020	Ayyappanum Koshiyum	Himself	Final Film
2023	Selfiee	Raj Mehta	story credits; Hindi remake of Driving License

=== As director ===
Year	Movie	Starring	Notes
2015	Anarkali	Prithviraj Sukumaran, Biju Menon, Priyal Gor	Debut film as a director
2020	Ayyappanum Koshiyum	Prithviraj Sukumaran, Biju Menon	National Film Award for Best Director
