= Mrudhu Bhave Dhruda Kruthye =

- Directed by: Shajoon Kariyal
- Screenplay by: Ravi Thottathil
- Story by: Dr Vijayshanker Menon
- Produced by: Dr Vijayshanker Menon
- Starring: Sooraj Sun; Sravana TN; Maria Prince; Dinesh Panicker; Suresh Krishna; Anil Anto; Seema G. Nair
- Cinematography: Nikhil V Narayanan
- Edited by: Sumesh B'Wt
- Music by: Sajan Madhav
- Production company: Hydroair Tectonics Pvt Ltd Sahasra Expertise (Co-Producer)
- Release date: 2 February 2024
- Running time: 147 minutes
- Country: India
- Language: Malayalam

Mrudhu Bhave Dhruda Kruthye (also marketed as MBDK) is an Indian Malayalam-language film directed by Shajoon Kariyal and produced by Hydroair Tectonics (SPD) Pvt. Ltd. The film stars Sooraj Sun, Sravana TN, Maria Prince, Dinesh Panicker, Suresh Krishna, Anil Anto and Seema G. Nair in lead roles. The cinematography was handled by Nikhil V Narayanan, and the film's score and songs were composed by Sajan Madhav. The film's story was written by Vijayshankar Menon, while the screenplay was handled by debutant Ravi Thotthil and dialogues were written by Rajesh Kurumali. The film was shot in Kasaragod, Ottapalam, Ernakulam and Mumbai. The film was theatrically released on 2 February 2024.

== Cast ==
- Sooraj Sun
- Sravana TN
- Maria Prince
- Dinesh Panicker
- Suresh Krishna
- Anil Anto
- Sivaraaj
- Seema G. Nair
- Maya Menon
- Sunny Leone as item number
- Jeeja Surendran

== Soundtrack ==
No.	Title	Singer(s)	Length
1.	"Kanimalar"	Hesham Abdul Wahab	04:38
2.	"Vellaram Kannulla Mane"	Naresh Iyer, Mridula Warrier	04:39
3.	"Maamankam Pooram Koodan"	Sachin Raj	03:16
4.	"Fanaa"	Sayanora	04:52
5.	"Pathiye Pathiye"	Binu Mathew

== Reception ==
Received mixed reviews
