= Rajaputhran =

1996 film by Shajoon Kariyal

- Directed by: Shajoon Kariyal
- Written by: Ranjith
- Produced by: Dinesh Panicker
- Starring: Suresh Gopi; Vikram; Vijayaraghavan; Shobhana; Murali
- Cinematography: P. Sukumar
- Edited by: K. Narayanan
- Music by: M. Jayachandran
- Release date: 11 October 1996
- Running time: 150 minutes
- Country: India
- Language: Malayalam

Rajaputhran (transl. King's son) is a 1996 Indian Malayalam-language action thriller film directed by Shajoon Kariyal (in his directorial debut) written by Ranjith, and produced by Dinesh Panicker. It stars Suresh Gopi, Vikram, Vijayaraghavan, Shobana, and Murali.

The film was simultaneously released in Malayalam, Tamil, and Telugu languages. It was a commercial success at the box office.

== Plot ==
Anand, who is a wildlife photographer by profession, has to return from a tour program upon hearing the shocking news of his father, M. K. Nair's unexpected death. He soon had to manage all the business establishments of his father under the guidance of their family friend, Balaraman, and his father's adopted son, K. R. Bhadran. Anand is already in love with a girl named Veni, who is the only daughter of a wealthy businessman, Vishwanathan, and both the families were arranging everything for the marriage.

As the story progresses, Anand becomes friends with Manu and his gang and also with a smuggler, Akbar, who is working for KC. Anand soon realizes that the people with him were not trustworthy and were actually cheating him and his company Sun Marines. They were illegally smuggling under his company's label and with the help of KC, whose boss is a Malabari, a criminal and a businessman.

When Anand realizes the truth he is shown out of the company as the company is now in the hands of Bhadran and his cronies who have forced MK Nair to write all the properties to them. Overnight Anand loses everything and is shown out.

How Anand fights back and wins everything back and destroys his enemies forms the crux of the movie.

== Cast ==
- Suresh Gopi as Anand, aka "Colonel"
- Vikram as Manu, Anand's Friend
- Vijayaraghavan as Akbar, Anand's Friend
- Murali as K. R Bhadran
- Shobhana as Veni, Anand's Love Interest
- Vineetha as Moti, Manu's Love Interest
- Thilakan as Balaraman, Anand's Family Friend
- M. G. Soman as Vishwanathan, Veni's Father
- Nedumudi Venu as M. K. Nair, Anand's Father
- Narendra Prasad as Vamadevan Karunakaran, Bhadran's Aide
- N. F. Varghese as Adv. Issac Thomas, Bhadran's Aide
- Mohan Raj as KC, Bhadran's Henchman
- Sadiq as Prathap Menon, Bhadran's Aide
- Augustine as Aboobacker
- Mamukkoya as Sayed Ibrahim Jabbar Thangal
- Tej Sapru as Masood Ali Malabari
- Jagannatha Varma as Chief Minister
- Kollam Thulasi as Advocate
- Mohan Jose as Police Officer
- Shivaji as Ex-Minister Thomas Kurian
- Paravoor Ramachandran as Dr. Rahman
- Subair as Customs Officer Sadasivan
- Abu Salim as Goonda
- Sudheer Sukumaran as Goonda
- Manjulan as Goonda

== Production ==
Ranjith originally wrote the screenplay for director Shaji Kailas with Mohanlal in the leading role. The movie was initially titled Emperor. However, the film did not materialise. Producer Dinesh Panicker, who was then searching for a screenplay for Suresh Gopi, bought Emperor from Ranjith. Rajaputhran was shot in Thiruvananthapuram, Kollam, Ernakulam and the fight and underwater scenes in Chennai. Filming lasted around 60 – 63 days.

== Music ==
The film has music composed by M. Jayachandran.

All lyrics are written by Girish Puthenchery.

Track listing
No.	Title	Singer(s)	Length
1.	"Hello Hello Mr Romeo" (Duet)	M. G. Sreekumar, Sujatha Mohan	4:40
2.	"Mizhi Pookkal"	Sujatha Mohan	3:48
3.	"Niravaavo Narupoovo" (Female)	K. S. Chithra	4:55
4.	"Niravaavo Narupoovo" (Male)	K. J. Yesudas	4:55
Total length:			18:18
