= Anarkali (2015 film) =

2015 film by Sachi-Sethu

- Theatrical release poster
- Directed by: Sachy
- Written by: Sachy
- Produced by: Rajeev Nair
- Starring: Prithviraj Sukumaran; Biju Menon
- Cinematography: Sujith Vaassudev
- Edited by: Ranjan Abraham
- Music by: Vidyasagar
- Production company: Magic Moon Productions
- Distributed by: Kalasangham Films; Kas & Right
- Release date: 11 November 2015 (Kerala)
- Running time: 167 minutes
- Country: India
- Language: Malayalam

Anarkali is a 2015 Indian Malayalam-language romantic thriller film written and directed by Sachy (in his directorial debut) and produced by Rajeev Nair. The film stars Prithviraj Sukumaran and Biju Menon with Priyal Gor, Miya George, Suresh Krishna, Arun, Sudev Nair, Kabir Bedi, and Samskruthy Shenoy in supporting roles. The music was composed by Vidyasagar. The plot follows former Indian Navy officer Shanthanu who arrives at Kavaratti island, a popular tourist destination.

Principal photography began in February 2015 and was shot mostly in Kavaratti, Bangaram, and Agatti in Lakshadweep. Anarkali was released on 11 November 2015 on the occasion of Diwali. It received generally positive reviews from critics and was a commercial success.

== Plot ==
Shanthanu Varma, a former navy officer, travels to Kavaratti, Lakshadweep to work as a deep-diving instructor. On reaching there, he meets Atta Koya who was awaiting his arrival. During the check in procedure by the coastal police, a man named Dheeraj Iyengar is found to have fake documents. He escapes from the police by jumping into the ocean. Shanthanu, on seeing this, jumps in and catches him. This turns out to be a planned mock drill called Gemini, conducted twice a year. Shanthanu befriends Dheeraj.

Shanthanu's friend Zachariah works as the lighthouse operator at Kavaratti. When Shanthanu goes to meet him, Zachariah hides due to the past issues between them. But Shanthanu succeeds in finding him regardless. Shanthanu pines over Nadira Imam, whom he loved 11 years ago. Due to Nadira being a minor at the time, he had to leave the Navy because of his affair with her. Seeing Zachariah's anguish in seeing him, Shanthanu reveals the real purpose of his arrival to Kavaratti- to find Nadira's brother Naseeb Imam, who works at the naval base in Kavaratti. On hearing this, Zachariah becomes upset that Shanthanu is still not over Nadira, but decides to help him find Naseeb. Atta Koya comes and asks them about their past issues. Zacharia narrates the story to him.

The movie cuts back to 11 years ago when Shanthanu and Zachariah were working in the navy. Shanthanu sees Nadira Imam, the daughter of Rear Admiral Jaffer Imam during a Navy Fest of 2004. Nadira, after performing her dance, gets impressed on Shathanu's melody performance. However Zacharia creates a scene in the hall after power cut happened between Shanthanu's performance. Hence both receive a red mark on their academic performance. One fine day, Shanthanu and Zacharia tells Nadira that there are rumours about their affair and she instantly falls for Shanthanu. However, when she learns that he was pranking, she makes him seriously confess his love to her which was also a prank by her. They fall in love with each other. One day after swimming Shanthanu and Nadira kiss each other in the bathroom. Jaffer witnesses this and beats Shanthanu badly. Nadira tells him that she really loves Shanthanu. The next day Shanthanu and Zacharia are summoned to the court for the charges against them. It is then they both learn that Nadira is a 15-year-old girl. They both plead non guilty. However Nadira tells the court officials that she loved Shanthanu and they were in a relation. They both are dismissed from the Navy. Nadira promises that she will wait for 5 years to confess the love to him.

Back to the present, Koya is shocked to learn that his niece Dua Miyan is going away with his boyfriend in a helicopter. However she refuses to go on seeing Koya's attitude. Dheeraj boards into the helicopter, gazing at Shanthanu. A suspicious Shanthanu learns that Dheeraj was none other that Naseeb Imam. The final hope to know about Nadira is being shattered. However Koya informs that he went on a ten days leave and his father's name is Jaffer Imam.

Then he narrates what happened after 5 years. For the first few years, Shanthanu and Nadira keep in touch through recorded CDs, which Jaffer eventually finds out and prevents her from sending. They lose all contact but Shanthanu still waits for her. Back in the present time Shanthanu is telling his story to everyone in Kavaratti. All of them sympathize with him. They tell him that they will help him find her. After some days Naseeb comes back and meets Shanthanu. He informs him that Nadira is still waiting for him, but she left home due to constant fights with her father.

Shanthanu wanted to meet her as soon as possible. So he decides to take the helicopter from there. But the helicopter could only be used for emergencies. So he and Zachariah come up with a plan where Shanthanu acts as if he is poisoned so that he can go to the city for medical care since the medical options available there were limited and didn't include modern equipment. For that, first, the Kavaratti medical superintendent Dr. Sherin Mathew has to confirm that he requires emergency medical attention. When taken to the hospital she confirms that he needs emergency medical care and he is immediately taken to the city along with Zachariah and Naseeb. On their way to Kochi, Shanthanu vomits blood, and Zachariah learns that he wasn't pretending. Zachariah panics and tells the pilot to reach their destination faster.

On reaching there, Shanthanu, in his half-awake state, sees Nadira waiting there for him crying as Naseeb already informed her. He is taken to the hospital where all his relatives, Nadira, and Jaffer are waiting eagerly outside the ICU. Doctors inform them that he will be fine. He insists on meeting Nadira, and Jaffer allows her to be with him.

Some days later they are shown to be together. They go to a religious place and a man over there says that their names had a strange yet blissful connection. Shanthanu was another name for Prince Salim and Nadira meant Anarkali alluding to the famous love story of Salim and Anarkali.

== Cast ==
- Prithviraj Sukumaran as Sub Lieutenant Shanthanu Godavarma, Ex-Indian Navy officer
- Biju Menon as Lieutenant Zachariah, Ex-Indian Navy officer
- Priyal Gor as Nadira Imam
- Suresh Krishna as Aatta Koya
- Arun as Rajeev
- Kabir Bedi as Rear Admiral Jaffer Imam, Indian Navy officer
- Sudev Nair as Sub Lieutenant Naseeb Imam, Indian Navy officer
- Miya George as Dr. Sherin George, Medical Superintendent Lakshadweep
- Samskruthy Shenoy as Dua Miyan Koya
- Renji Panicker as Pappan
- Madhupal as Madhu
- Assim Jamal as Inspector Jamal Majnu, Lakshadweep police officer
- Shyamaprasad as Commodore Madhavan Nair, Indian Navy officer
- Major Ravi as Commander Rajan Jose, Indian Navy officer
- Jayaraj Warrier as Chettuva Shah Jahan Sahib Avarkal
- Vijayakumar as Public Prosecutor Suresh Nambiar, Indian Navy officer
- Manju Satheesh as Shanthi
- Chembil Ashokan as DYSP Ahmed Kutty
- Sunil Babu as Kunji Koya
- Anu Sithara as Athira, Shanthanu's niece (Cameo)
- V. K. Prakash as Dr. David (Cameo)

== Production ==
=== Casting ===
The story of the film is based on two Naval officers, Prithviraj Sukumaran and Biju Menon in the Indian Navy. Bollywood actor Kabir Bedi was cast as Nadira's father, Jaffer Imam, who is a commanding officer of base hailing from Lucknow. Sachy said that both Kabir and Priyal would speak mostly in Hindi and English in the film. Priyal Gor and Miya were signed for the lead female roles. While the former would play the main lead as Nadira Imam, the teenage daughter of a Rear Admiral in the Indian Navy, the latter's role is that of a supporting character, Dr. Sherin Mathew, who works in Kavarathi. Director Shyamaprasad was selected for a pivotal role and his character Commodore Madhavan Nair was said to be crucial to the film. Samskruthy Shenoy was later chosen to portray Duvha, a "Pucca Muslim woman" from Lakshwadweep, who is a medical student that left her studies 1 year shy of completion, due to a love affair and works as a physician assistant. Other supporting roles were given to directors Major Ravi, Renji Panicker and Madhupal. Sujith Vassudevv and Vidyasagar were signed as the cinematographer and music director, respectively.

=== Filming ===
The makers faced objections from the Sunni Students' Federation (SSF) against shooting the film in the Lakshadweep islands. The makers had permission to shoot the film in Agatti Island, Kavaratti, Bangaram Atoll, and Tinakkara Island in February 2015, however, a day before they were to reach the islands, the Lakshadweep administrator H. Rajesh Prasad revoked their permission informing that the SSF has filed a petition with him signed by the local Imam stating that "cinema is un-Islamic" and allowing to shoot would create communal issues. Sachy informed a senior official with the Ministry of Home Affairs, who called the administrator to Delhi and urged him to clear the permission and if there's a law and order issue then the central forces can be deployed. Permission was issued as soon as he reached the Island. Sachy recalled that most of the locals were in support of the shoot when they arrived at Kavaratti. Nevertheless, he faced difficulties to shoot a crowd scene as he could only get local men, as the islanders were Muslims who said their women are not to be featured in cinema. Sachy finally managed to get some reluctant local women to shoot the scene.

== Soundtrack ==
Anarkali

Soundtrack album by Vidyasagar
- Released: 23 October 2015
- Recorded: Varsha Vallaki Studios
- Genre: Feature film soundtrack
- Length: 23:14
- Language: Malayalam
- Label: Satyam Audios
- Producer: Vidyasagar

Vidyasagar chronology
Eli (2015)	Anarkali (2015)	Uchathula Shiva (2016)

The soundtrack was released on 23 October 2015, with songs composed by Vidyasagar and lyrics written by Rajeev Nair and Manoj Muntashir. The "over and over" song was written by Radhika Nair and composed by Sreevalsan J. Menon.

Track listing
No.	Title	Singer(s)	Length
1.	"Aa Oruthi"	Vineeth Sreenivasan, Manjari	4:20
2.	"Ee Thanutha"	Karthik, Shweta Mohan	4:09
3.	"Sahibaa"	Hariharan	4:41
4.	"Mohabbath (Hindi Version)"	Shreya Ghoshal, Shadab Faridi Nizami	5:22
5.	"Vaanam"	K. S. Harisankar	4:42
6.	"Over n' Over"	Dominique Cerejo	2:51
Total length:			23:14

== Release ==
Anarkali was released on 13 November 2015 during Diwali.
