= Driving Licence (film) =

2019 film by Lal Jr.

- Theatrical release poster
- Directed by: Lal Jr.
- Written by: Sachy
- Produced by: Supriya Menon; Listin Stephen
- Starring: Prithviraj Sukumaran; Suraj Venjaramood
- Cinematography: Alex J. Pulickal
- Edited by: Ratheesh Raj
- Music by: Yakzan Gary Pereira; Neha Nair
- Production companies: Prithviraj Productions; Magic Frames
- Distributed by: Magic Frames
- Release date: 20 December 2019
- Running time: 135 minutes
- Country: India
- Language: Malayalam

Driving Licence is a 2019 Indian Malayalam-language satirical comedy-drama film directed by Lal Jr, written by Sachy and produced by Prithviraj Productions and Magic Frames. It stars Prithviraj Sukumaran and Suraj Venjaramood. The story follows film actor Hareendran who wants a driving licence urgently and his ardent fan, Motor Vehicle Inspector Kuruvila Joseph, agrees on delivering it illegally, but their rendezvous does not go well, on the contrary, a feud develops between them that takes a toll on the personal and professional lives of both.

Driving Licence was released in India on 20 December 2019 and internationally from 25 December 2019. The film received positive reviews from critics and was a commercial success at the box office. The film was remade in Hindi as Selfiee (2023) starring Akshay Kumar and Emraan Hashmi in lead roles.

== Plot ==
Kuruvilla Joseph, a Motor Vehicle Inspector (MVI) at Kakkanad RTO is a passionate fan of Malayalam film actor Hareendran. Hareendran is preparing to leave for the United States for his wife's diagnosis, interrupting the shooting of his film, The Great Dictator, which has already incurred a budget overrun. With the climax still remaining to be shot at an Indian Navy leased land, the crew learns that Hareendran's driving licence, that needs to be submitted to get clearance, is missing. The producer is outraged as the film has to be wrapped as soon as possible.

Due to a clerical error while shifting between RTO buildings, Hareendran cannot apply for a duplicate licence as issuing a new licence would take time. Hence, Hareendran's politician friend Peringodan meets Kuruvila to speed up the procedure. Kuruvila agrees to issue the licence illicitly without Hareendran even taking a driving test. In return, he summons Hareendran to the RTO to meet him in person and as proof in case of an inquiry. Meanwhile, Hareendran's professional rival Bhadran is plotting to suppress competition from Hareendran by means of deceit.

Even though he realises going to the RTO might give away clues for his visit, Hareendran hesitatingly agrees, hoping that an unadvertised visit calls for less visibility. On his arrival, he sees TV channels surrounding the premises, amidst, a peon gives a misinformation to a reporter that Hareendran, an avid driver, has been driving without a licence. The news spreads, and an infuriated Hareendran scolds Kuruvila in front of his son and superiors for the leak and leaves. Angered, Kuruvila informs reporters that Hareendran was arrogant and wanted a licence without going through the normal procedures.

Hareendran's reputation has been severely damaged and to worsen the situation, Bhadran's fans community head, Saheer, organises a hit-and-run attack on Kuruvila. At midnight, a masked gang cast stones at his house and Kuruvila's son suffers a head injury. Kuruvila believes it is Hareendran's men. Meanwhile, Hareendran reluctantly cancels his US trip on the producer's insistence. While rushing his son to the hospital, a frustrated Hareendran calls Kuruvila by phone and threatens him, which affirms Kuruvila's suspicions.

On police inquiry, Kuruvila and wife accuses Hareendran, but Hareendran is not charged as his involvement was inconclusive. Protesting it, Kuruvila and family perform Satyagraha in front of Hareendran's residence, where media and fans also assemble. Amidst, a drunkard named Agasthi is trying to meet Hareendran but is denied entrance. Addressing media, Hareendran states that Kuruvila is a crazy fan and a kind of stalker who finds gratification by being a part in his idol's life through disruption. He shows Kuruvila's fan messages as evidence and announces that he has decided to attend the test in the supervision of Kuruvila.

Hareendran gets permission for an open test, which can be viewed by media and can be telecast live, the computer-based test is replaced with a direct question-answer session with Kuruvila. Kuruvila asks difficult and unusual questions, still Hareendran manages to pass the learner's test. Kuruvila's son is bullied by Hareendran's fan-boys in school. With that, Kuruvila decides not to send him school until Hareendran has failed and is determined to fail him using maximum discretion. Meanwhile, Hareendran's wife requires a surgery, and a flight is charted to reach there as soon as the test is completed.

On the practical assessment day, Hareendran smoothly completes the "H test", but Kuruvila fails him pointing petty mistakes. The Decision is overruled by his superior and passes Hareendran. Kuruvila makes Hareendran wait until noon for the follow-up "road test". At noon, he postpones the test by two days, which happens to be the day of Hareendran's wife's surgery. Hareendran announces to the onlooking fans and media that he is forfeiting driving forever because Kuruvila has totally misused his power and he will retire from acting if this disrupts his life further. Enraged fans begin lynching Kuruvila, Hareendran saves him and flees from the place.

While en route, they clear the misunderstandings. Hareendran brings Kuruvila and his family to his house. Two days later, before leaving to the airport Hareendran interacts with the press about their reconciliation. A drunken Agasthi interferes and deliver him a laminated copy of his lost licence and said he has been trying to reach him since the beginning. To the crowd, Hareendran says: "I can drive now, right ? Received my driving licence". He then drives off in his car.

== Cast ==
- Prithviraj Sukumaran as Hareendran, an actor
- Suraj Venjarammoodu as Motor Vehicle Inspector Kuruvila Joseph
- Miya George as Elsa, Kuruvila's wife
- Deepti Sati as Bhama, Hareendran's wife
- Saiju Kurup as Johny Peringodan, Hareendran's friend
- Suresh Krishna as Bhadran, an actor
- Lalu Alex as Jagannatha Varma
- Major Ravi as J. RTO Samuel Jackson
- Nandu as Kunjali / Kunjalikka, Hareendran's driver
- Shivaji Guruvayoor as RTO Siva G.
- Adish Praveen as Jinto Kuruvila, Kuruvila's son
- Arun as Movie Director
- Aneesh G. Menon as Saheer
- Salim Kumar as Agasthi
- Vijayakumar as DYSP Joseph Unniyadan
- Nandhu Pothuval as Driver, Production Controller
- Kalabhavan Navas as Menon
- Sohan Seenulal as Anandu Panicker
- Mridul Nair as Kabeer
- Boban Alummoodan as Kottukapalli
- Sunil Babu as RTO Office Peon
- Kalabhavan Haneef as Pillai
- Thomas Kuriakose as Kuruvila's neighbour
- Shafique Rahman as Channel Reporter
- Remya Panicker as Film Heroine
- Vijayaraghavan as Himself (Cameo)
- Idavela Babu as Himself (Cameo)
- Mafia Sasi as Himself (Cameo)
- Innocent as Himself (Cameo voice-role)

== Production ==
The film was launched on 11 July 2019 and principal photography began in the following week.

== Soundtrack ==
Driving Licence

Soundtrack album by Yakzan Gary Pereira
- Released: 2019
- Genre: Feature film soundtrack
- Length: 7:10
- Label: Magic Frames

The music and original score are composed by Yakzan Gary Pereira, and Neha Nair with lyrics written by Santhosh Varma, and Sam Matthew. There is title song and main track sung by Anthony Daasan, Sangeeth, and Neha Nair.

Track listing
No.	Title	Singer(s)	Length
1.	"Njan Thedum Ponthaaram"	Anthony Daasan	4:15
2.	"Varum Varum"	Anthony Daasan	2:55
Total length:			07:10

== Release ==
=== Theatrical ===
Driving License was released in India on 20 December 2019 and internationally from 25 December 2019, debuting in the Gulf Cooperation Council.

=== Home media ===
The film had a digital release through Amazon Prime Video. It is also available in Hindi dubbed version currently streaming on Ultra Play app.

== Reception ==
=== Critical reception ===
Rating 4 in a scale of 5, The New Indian Express praised writer Sachy, stating that he "proves once again why he is one of the best screenwriters in Malayalam cinema at the moment. His writing carries the sort of colour and flavour last seen in the early Priyadarshan, Sreenivasan, and Siddique-Lal films" and that "the purpose of any good cinema is to not just entertain but also deliver a wholesome community experience, which is exactly what Driving Licence does", and also praised the actors' performances. Anna M. M. Vetticad from Firstpost rated 3.5 out of 5 stars and said "Prithviraj is terrific in a captivating drama on pride and pettiness, fandom and fury", and "each time you think you have cracked Driving Licence, it takes a surprising turn. This screenplay is one of the cleverest pieces of writing to emerge from Malayalam cinema in what is already a great year for Mollywood" and praised the direction, editing and actors' performance.

Malayala Manorama rated 3.5 out of 5 and stated that "The plot, which gains incredible momentum from a small thread, is actually the hero of the movie. The screenwriter and the director have been able to present it amazingly without making the audience bored" and praised the acting of Prithviraj and Suraj. Rating 3 out of 5 stars, Sify dubbed it "entertaining" and "a fine journey that keeps the viewer engaged all along", also adding: "with a tight script that has humour, emotions and drama, Sachy scores well. Lal Jr. packages the movie in an entertaining way. The visuals and the music are good" and praised Prithviraj for his "top notch performance" and Suraj for his "terrific form".

The Indian Express rated 3 out of 5 and called it "an engaging watch" and that the "director Lal Jr and his writer Sachy have conceived a solid premise that makes this meta-film an engrossing watch". Rating 3 out of 5, The Times of India wrote that the film "has all the necessary elements to keep you glued to it. Mostly, it is a kick-back-your-shoes-and-enjoy fun ride". The News Minute also rated 3 out of 5 and wrote: "In an interesting plot that falters at places, especially in the characterisation of women, you catch present-day realities and the dangers of a star-fan relationship" and "Prithviraj and Suraj play the star-fan roles admirably well".

=== Box office ===
The film collected $358,424 in the opening weekend in the United Arab Emirates and $489,429 in two weeks.

== Remake ==
Dharma Productions and Cape of Good Films bought the remake rights for the film in January 2022. Directed by Raj Mehta, Akshay Kumar and Emraan Hashmi reprise the roles played by Prithviraj Sukumaran and Suraj Venjaramoodu.

Selfiee was announced in January 2022. Principal photography commenced in March in Mumbai and finished in August. The film was released on 24 February 2023.
