= Phantom (2002 film) =

- Poster
- Directed by: Biju Varkey
- Written by: Dennis Joseph
- Produced by: Dr. Sudhakaran Nair
- Starring: Mammootty; Manivannan; Manoj K. Jayan; Innocent; Nishanth Sagar; Nedumudi Venu; Lalu Alex
- Cinematography: Biju Viswanath
- Edited by: A. Sreekar Prasad
- Music by: Deva
- Release date: April 5, 2002
- Country: India
- Language: Malayalam

Phantom (theatrical release name: Phantom Pailey) is a 2002 Malayalam action drama film directed by Biju Varkey. It stars Mammootty in the title role, and Manivannan, Manoj K. Jayan, Innocent, Nishanth Sagar, Nedumudi Venu and Lalu Alex in other pivotal roles.

== Cast ==
- Mammootty as Phantom Pailey
- Manivannan as Varadaraja Perumal
- Innocent as Father Pothachan Kodalickal
- Manoj K. Jayan as SI Bastin alias Sebastian
- Nedumudi Venu as Gandhi Gangadharan Pillai
- Lalu Alex as Dhimdhi Mathai
- Cochin Haneefa as Sexton Devassi
- Nishanth Sagar as Josekutty, Pailey's younger brother
- Malavika as Sathi
- Monica as Hema
- Bindu Panikkar as Maria, Devasi's wife
- N. F. Varghese as Chellappan Pillai
- Shammi Thilakan as Bhadran
- Aswathy as Chandrika
- Sajan Palluruthy as Omanakuttan, newspaper agent
- Joemon Joshy as Kennedy, Avarachan's son
- Bheeman Raghu as Irachi Pranchi/Francis
- Ramji as dancer
- Jose Prakash as Senior Priest

== Soundtrack ==
Music: Deva, Lyrics: Gireesh Puthenchery

- Kurum Kuzhal Osai ... - KS Chithra
- Viral Thottal [D] ... - P Jayachandran, KS Chithra
- Sunu Mithuvare ... - KJ Yesudas
- Maattupongal [D] ... - SP Balasubrahmanyam, KS Chithra
- Viral Thottaal [F] ... - KS Chithra
- Maattupponkal [M] ... - SP Balasubrahmanyam

== Release ==
The film was released on 5 April 2002. Movie had released on vishu vacation season and went on to become hit in Kerala box office.
