= Anchil Oral Arjunan =

2007 Indian film

- Official poster
- Directed by: Anil
- Written by: T. A. Razzaq
- Produced by: P. Narayanan
- Starring: Jayaram; Padmapriya; Samvrutha Sunil; Siddique; Sreenivasan; Madhu Warrier; Jagathy Sreekumar; Venu Nagavally
- Cinematography: Anandakuttan
- Edited by: PC Mohanan
- Music by: Mohan Sithara
- Release date: 27 January 2007
- Country: India
- Language: Malayalam

Anchil Oral Arjunan is a 2007 Indian Malayalam-language family drama film directed by Anil and starring Jayaram, Padmapriya, Samvrutha, Siddique, Sreenivasan, Madhu Warrier, Jagathy Sreekumar and Venu Nagavally. The film was a box office failure.

== Plot ==
Sudheendran "Sudhi" works as a class tutor and theatrical actor and Kovilakam Sreedharan is his benefactor. Sudhi falls in love with Pavithra. When Sudhi reconnects with his childhood friend Sathi, Pavithra gets mad at Sudhi. More problems ensue after his cousins Vijayan and Vinayan want to take his family house. How Sudhi solves his problems forms the rest of the plot.

== Cast ==
- Jayaram as Sudheendran a.k.a. Sudhi
- Siddique as Vijayan
- Padmapriya as Pavithra
- Samvrutha Sunil as Sathi
- Sreenivasan as Kovilakam Sreedharan
- Madhu Warrier as Vinayan
- Jagathy Sreekumar as Paul
- Venu Nagavally as Padmanabhan
- Kalpana as Shantha
- Kaviyoor Ponnamma as Sudheendran's mother
- K. P. A. C. Lalitha as Vijayan's mother

== Release and reception ==
The film was ready for release in January 2007. A critic from Sify opined that "More bad news for Jayaram fans. His films are getting from bad to worse. They have the same hackneyed storyline, scenes and look the same with nothing new in it. And to put it mildly, Jayaram should stop getting saddled with such asinine and dumb roles". C. Parashuram from Webindia 123 wrote that ""Anchil Oraal Arjunan" is strictly for hardcore Jayaram fans". A critic from Indiaglitz called the film absorbing and not entertaining. Unni Nair of Nowrunning gave a mixed review and wrote that "But the subject chosen doesn't seem to have anything new and is like old wine in a new bottle.".
