= Miya George =

Indian actress

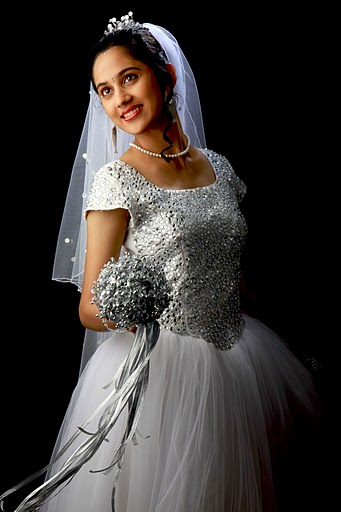
- Miya during a wedding photoshoot
- Born: Gimi George
- Education: St. Thomas College, Palai
- Occupations: Actress; model
- Years active: 2010–present
- Spouse: Ashwin Philip (m. 2020)
- Children: 1

Gimi George, better known by her stage name Miya George, is an Indian actress and model who predominantly works in Malayalam films, along with a few Tamil films. She made her film debut by playing short roles in films such as Oru Small Family (2010), Doctor Love (2011) and Ee Adutha Kaalathu (2012). She was selected the Kerala Miss Fitness in 2012 and played her first lead role the same year in the Malayalam film Chettayees.

== Early life ==
Miya George was born in a Syro-Malabar Catholic family in Mumbai, where her father was working as an engineer. At the age of four, she moved to Pala in Kottayam. She was educated at Sacred Heart Girls High School, Bharananganam, and St. Mary's Higher Secondary School, Bharananganam. She then did her B.A. at Alphonsa College and M.A. in English Literature at St. Thomas College, Palai. She has an elder sister.

== Personal life ==
On 12 September 2020, she married businessman Ashwin Philip at the St. Mary's Basilica Church in Ernakulam, in a simple ceremony due to COVID-19 restrictions. They had a son born in July 2021. Her father, George Joseph, died two months later on 21 September 2021.

== Career ==
George started her career by playing supporting roles in the television serials Alphonsamma and Kunjali Marakkar. She wain the films Doctor Love and Ee Adutha Kaalathu. She rose to fame when she was chosen the Kerala Miss Fitness 2012 in a beauty pageant. She made her debut as a heroine through the film Ettekaal Second but the project got a commercial release in the year 2014. Actress Urmila Unni who played Miya's mother in this film suggested her to director Shajoon Kariyal who cast her to play the lead role in his 2012 comedy film Chettayees. She played the wife of the character played by Biju Menon which won her critical acclaim. Miya was then seen in the Mohanlal-starrer Red Wine in which she played the lead opposite Asif Ali. She played the role of an investigative journalist in Jeethu Joseph's Memories which turned out to be a major hit of the year 2013. The same year she appeared as a Christian nun thrown out of the church inVishudhan. In 2014, she appeared in veteran director Joshiy's Salaam Kashmier in which she played the lead role alongside Jayaram and Suresh Gopi and B. Unnikrishnan's Mr. Fraud in which she paired with Mohanlal. She also appeared in Lal Jr.'s psychological thriller Hi I'm Tony in which she paired opposite Asif Ali for the second time, George Varghese's 6B Paradise, and K. N. Sasidharan's Nayana which had her playing the mother of a young girl. She made her debut in Tamil with Jeeva Shankar's Amara Kaaviyam in which she played a character called Karthika. In 2015 she had done 32aam Adhyayam 23aam Vaakyam.

== Filmography ==
=== Films ===
- All films are in Malayalam, unless otherwise noted

Key
†	Denotes films that have not yet been released

Year	Title	Role	Notes
2010	Oru Small Family	Manikutty	Credited as Gimi George
2011	Doctor Love	Ebin's friend	Credited as Gimi George
2012	Ee Adutha Kaalathu	Shyleja	Credited as Gimi George
2012	Navagatharkku Swagatham	Elsa	Credited as Gimi George
2012	Thiruvambadi Thampan	Film actress	Credited as Gimi George
2012	Chettayees	Merlin	
2013	Red Wine	Deepthi	
2013	Memories	Varsha Varghese	
2013	Vishudhan	Sophie	
2014	Salaam Kashmier	Suja/Leena	
2014	Ettekaal Second	Neethu	
2014	Mr. Fraud	Saraswathi	
2014	Hi I'm Tony	Tina	
2014	Amara Kaaviyam	Karthika	Tamil film
2014	Nayana	Swetha	
2014	Cousins	Ann	
2015	32aam Adhyayam 23aam Vaakyam	Ann/Lucia	
2015	Indru Netru Naalai	Anu	Tamil film
2015	Anarkali	Dr. Sherin George	
2016	Hello Namasthe	Anna	
2016	Valleem Thetti Pulleem Thetti	Sreekala	
2016	Pavada	Sinimol	
2016	Vetrivel	Janani	Tamil film
2016	Oru Naal Koothu	Lakshmi	Tamil film
2017	The Great Father	Dr. Susan	
2017	Rum	Thulasi	Tamil film
2017	Yaman	Anjana/Agalya	Tamil film
2017	Bobby	Mariya	
2017	Sherlock Toms	Shiney Mattummel	
2017	Ungarala Rambabu	Savithri	Telugu film
2018	Ira	Karthika/Vaiga Devi	
2018	Parole	Kathrina	
2018	Ente Mezhuthiri Athazhangal	Anjali	
2019	Pattabhiraman	Tanuja Varma	
2019	Brother's Day	Thaneesha	
2019	Driving License	Elsa Kuruvila	
2020	Al Mallu	Gimi	Cameo
2021	Guardian	Meera Mohandas IPS	
2022	Cobra	Madhi and Kathir's unnamed mother	Tamil film
2023	Pranaya Vilasam	Meera	
2023	The Road	Uma	Tamil film
2024	Thalavan	Sunitha	
2024	Big Ben	Police Inspector PJ Arunima	
2026	Thudakkam	Chinnu's teacher	Cameo
2026	Cosmic Samson †	TBA	

=== Television ===
Year	Title	Role	Channel	Notes
2007- 2008	Velankanni Mathavu	Mathavu	Surya TV	tv serial
2009	Ente Alphonsamma	Mary	Asianet	tv serial
2010	Kunjali Marakkar	Thamburatty	Asianet	tv serial
2010	Viswasthan		Green TV	telefilm
2011	Alphonsamma	Lakshmi kutty	Shalom TV	tv serial
2012	Sreekrishnan	Dancer in title song	Surya TV	tv serial
2012	Bhima Jewels Comedy Festival	Host/Judge	Mazhavil Manorama	
2016	Vishudha Chavara Achan	Promo Anchor	Flowers	tv serial
2017	Malayali Veettamma	Mentor	Flowers (TV channel)	Launch episode
2018	Comedy Stars season 2	Judge	Asianet	
2018	Katturumbu	Judge	Flowers	
2018	Flowers top singer	Judge	Flowers	
2019	D5 Junior	Judge	Mazhavil Manorama	
2020	Surya Super Jodi No.1	Judge	Surya TV	
2021	Top singer Star night	Judge	Flowers	
2021/ 2023	Star Magic	Mentor	Flowers (TV channel)	
2022	Funs Up On A Time 2	Judge	Amrita TV	
2022	Red Carpet	Mentor	Amrita TV	
2022	Dance Kerala Dance Season 2	Judge	Zee Keralam	
2023	Drama Juniors	Judge	Zee Keralam	
2023	Ente Amma Superaa	Judge	Mazhavil Manorama	
2023	kidilam	Judge	Mazhavil Manorama	
2024	Oru Chiri Iru Chiri Bumper Chiri	Judge	Mazhavil Manorama	
2024	Jai Mahendran	Priya Mahendran	Sony LIV	
2026	Drama Juniors season 2	Judge	Zee Keralam	

Music album

- Final Over (YouTube)

Participant

- Sell Me the Answer ( Asianet )
- Ningalkkum Aakaam Kodeeshwaran ( Asianet )
- Paryam Nedam (Amrita TV)
- Bzinga (Zee Keralam)
- Flowers Oru Kodi (Flowers)
