= Sir C. P. =

- Theatrical release poster
- Directed by: Shajoon Kariyal
- Written by: S. Suresh Babu
- Produced by: M. K. Nassar; Stanley C. S.
- Starring: Jayaram; Honey Rose; Rohini; Hareesh Peradi; Seema; Vijayaraghavan
- Narrated by: Biju Menon
- Cinematography: Alagappan N.
- Edited by: Sandeep Nandakumar
- Music by: Sejo John; Bijibal (Background Score)
- Distributed by: Good Line Release
- Release date: May 2015
- Country: India
- Language: Malayalam

Sir Chethimattathu Philip (Sir C. P.) is a 2015 Malayalam action comedy film by Shajoon Kariyal with Jayaram in the title role. Honey Rose is doing the role of lady lead in this film. Lyrics of the movie were written by Dr Madhu Vasudevan.

== Cast ==
- Jayaram as Sidharthan aka CP (Chethimattathu Philip)
- Honey Rose as Alice
- Rohini as Kochu Mary
- Seema as Mary
  - Malavika Menon as Young Mary
- Vijayaraghavan as Sharadi Maash
- Hareesh Peradi as Kuriyachan
- Bhagath Manuel as Sajan
- Baiju Ezhupunna as Isaac
- Rahul Madhav
- Jayakrishnan as Chethimattathu Mathews, Sidharthan's (CP)'s father
- Mukundan
- Sadiq as Kuruvilla
- Bheeman Raghu as himself (Guest Appearance)

== Reception ==
A critic from The Times of India wrote that "In the end, Sir CP is yet another stale family story that you can watch if you have no other option".

== Shooting ==
Most of the shooting was done around Changanacherry, a town in Kottayam, Kerala. Some places covered are Green Leaf Restaurant and Raja's school.
