= Swantham Lekhakan =

- Swantham Lekhakan
- Directed by: P. Sukumar
- Written by: Kalavoor Ravikumar
- Produced by: P. Sukumar; Madhu Warrier
- Starring: Dileep; Gopika; Innocent; Nedumudi Venu; Salim Kumar
- Cinematography: P. Sukumar
- Edited by: Ranjan Abraham
- Music by: Bijibal
- Production company: Colour Factory
- Release date: 29 October 2009
- Country: India
- Language: Malayalam

Swantham Lekhakan, also known as Swa. Le., is a 2009 Indian Malayalam-language film directed and co-produced by debuting filmmaker P. Sukumar and scripted by Kalavoor Ravikumar. Dileep and Gopika play the lead roles while Nedumudi Venu, Innocent and Salim Kumar play major supporting roles.

The film was mainly shot at various locations in Thodupuzha.

This is the 4th film in which Dileep and Gopika appeared together after Chanthupottu, Pachakkuthira and The Don. This is Gopika's first film after her marriage. This film was released along with another Dileep starrer film, Kerala Cafe. P. Sukumar won Kerala State Film Award for Best Debut Director for this film.

== Cast ==
- Dileep as Unni Madhavan
- Gopika as Vimala
- Innocent as Kaimal
- KPAC Lalitha as Sarojini Amma
- Nedumudi Venu as Palazhi Sivasankarappilla
- Kunchan as Charlie, News reporter
- Ashokan as Hari
- Jagathy Sreekumar as Govindan
- Ganesh Kumar as Vishnu
- Harisree Asokan as Balan
- Sadiq as Mukundan
- Salim Kumar as Chandramohan
- Vijayaraghavan as Shreedharan
- Nandu Pothuval as Theepantham Janardhanan
- T. P. Madhavan as Chief Minister George Isaac
- Ambika Mohan as Govindan's wife
- Kalabhavan Haneef as News reporter
- Idavela Babu as Bijuraj
- Nishanth Sagar as Sandeep Jadeja
- Shaju as Martin
- Manikuttan as Vinod Raghavan
- Majeed as Opposition Leader Habeeb Mustafa
- Kalaranjini as Shantha
- Shivaji Guruvayoor as Madhavan
- Kalabhavan Shajon as Reporter
- Seema G. Nair as Kamalakshi
- Sona Nair as Dr. Malathi
- Kochu Preman as Minister Aravindakshan
- Sreejith Ravi as Ramanathan
- Raveendran as Ravi Kumar
- Madhu Warrier as Dr. Ramkumar
- Gadha Salam as Palazhi's friend
- Krishnaprabha as bride
