= Dinesh Panicker =

Malayalam film producer, actor and TV producer

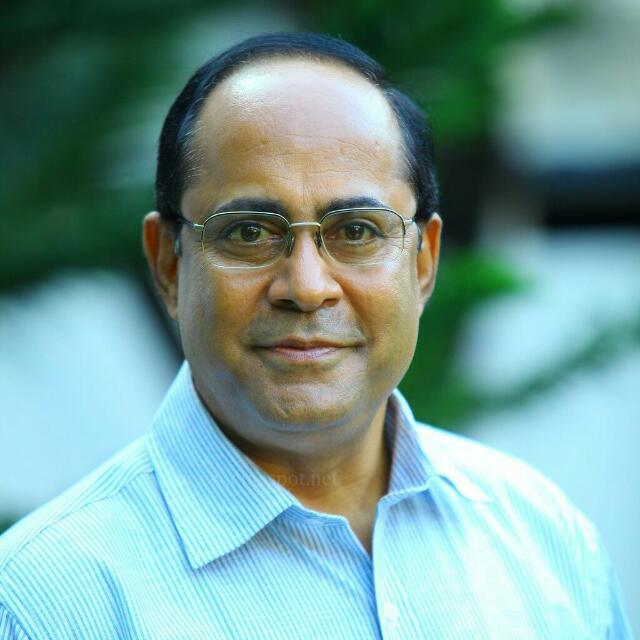
- Born: Kerala, India
- Occupations: Film producer; Actor
- Years active: 1989 – present
- Children: 2

Dinesh Panicker is an Indian film producer, actor and TV producer. He entered the film industry in 1989 by producing Kireedam, a critically acclaimed and commercially successful film. He went on to produce different genre films in Mollywood. Later, he started acting in Malayalam films and serials, and is now the general secretary of ATMA (Association of Television Media Artistes).

== Career ==
Panicker began his film career in 1989 by co-producing Kireedam, which stars Mohanlal and was directed by Sibi Malayil. The film's budget was ₹23 lakh and it was a commercial success. At first, Panicker wanted to play a small role as the husband of Parvathy but he reconsidered it due to resistance from his wife. He later said he never dared to act in films he produced.

Panicker's second movie was Cheppukilukkana Changathi, a comedy-drama starring Mukesh and Jagadish. In 1995, he produced Boxer, which stars Babu Antony as an action hero. His next film, Kaliveedu, is a 1996 family drama. That year, he produced Rajaputhran, an action-drama film and the directorial debut of Shajoon Kariyal. It was released in both Tamil and Telugu. Mayilpeelikkavu, a mystery-thriller film, was produced in 1998.

Panicker reunited with Sibi Malayil for a romance film Pranayavarnangal, starring Suresh Gopi, Manju Warrier, Divya Unni and Biju Menon. He produced Mammootty-starrer political conspiracy crime film Stalin Sivadas, which was released in 1999. He tried a new formula in Malayalam films by casting television presenter Koottickal Jayachandran in a lead role in his movie Chirikkudukka. Panicker later started an acting venture in Malayalam films and television serials, and is now general secretary of the Association of Television Media Artistes (ATMA).

== Filmography ==
=== As producer ===
Year	Film	Director	Cast	Ref.
1989	Kireedam	Sibi Malayil	Mohanlal, Thilakan, Parvathy, Murali	
1991	Cheppukilukkana Changathi	Kaladharan	Mukesh, Jagadish, Saranya	
1995	Boxer	Baiju Kottarakkara	Babu Antony, Haritha, Jagathy	
1996	Kaliveedu	Sibi Malayil	Jayaram, Manju Warrier, Jagadish, Sunitha	
1996	Rajaputhran	Shajoon Kariyal	Suresh Gopi, Vikram, Vijayaraghavan, Murali, Shobana	
1998	Mayilpeelikkavu	Anil Babu	Kunchacko Boban, Jomol, Thilakan, Jagathy, Cochin Haneefa	
1998	Pranayavarnangal	Sibi Malayil	Suresh Gopi, Manju Warrier, Divyaa Unni, Biju Menon, Karamana	
1999	Stalin Sivadas	T. S. Suresh Babu	Mammootty, Khushbu, Madhu, Jagadish	
2002	Chirikkudukka	T.S Saji	Koottickal Jayachandran, Deepthi Prasad, Jagadish, Kalpana	

=== As actor ===
Year	Title	Role	Notes
1981	Dhanya		
2007	Rock n' Roll	Sreenivas	
2008	Mizhikal Sakshi	Devaswom Manager	
2008	Shakespeare M.A. Malayalam		
2009	Chemistry	School Principal	
2009	Puthiya Mukham	Doctor	
2010	Janakan	Kuttiyachan	
2010	April Fool	Duttan	
2010	Annarakkannanum Thannalayathu		
2010	The Thriller	Joseph Palathingal	
2010	Kanyakumari Express	Adv. John	
2010	Thathwamasi	SI Mathews	
2010	Kaaryasthan		
2012	Ee Adutha Kaalathu	Minister	
2012	Thalsamayam Oru Penkutty		
2012	Arike	Subramanya Pai	
2012	Hero		
2013	ABCD: American-Born Confused Desi	Shekhar Pillan	
2013	Left Right Left	Roy's Doctor	
2013	Bangles		
2013	Vedivazhipadu		
2013	Crocodile Love Story	SP Anthony	
2013	Annum Innum Ennum		
2014	Angels	DIG Rajan Ponnose	
2014	Villali Veeran		
2014	Ring Master	Interviewer	
2014	Praise the Lord	Cherian Varghese	
2015	Female Unnikrishnan		
2015	Nirnnayakam		
2015	Lord Livingstone 7000 Kandi	Ananthu's Father-in-law	
2016	Kali	Anjali's father	
2016	Crayons	Principal	
2017	Thank You Very Much		
2018	Ira	Doctor	
2018	21 Diamonds		
2019	Kodathi Samaksham Balan Vakeel	Home Minister	
2019	Chila NewGen Nattuvisheshangal	Lakshmana Kurup	
2019	Brother's Day	Davis	
2019	Oru Mass Kadha Veendum		
2019	Janaadhipan	Governor	
2019	Pattabhiraman	Vasudevan	
2019	Ormma		
2019	Nalla Vishesham		
2020	Big Brother	Mohanachandran	
2020	Joshua		
2021	One	Ananthan IPS	
2021	Escape	Doctor	
2022	Karnan Napoleon Bhagath Singh		
2023	1921: Puzha Muthal Puzha Vare		
2023	Garudan	Judge of District Court	
2024	Jamalinte Punjiri		
2024	Gangs of Sukumara Kurup		
2024	Her	Sundaram	
2025	Moonnam Nombaram		
2026	Juniors Journey		

== Television ==
Year	Serial	Role	Channel	Notes	Ref.
2003	Swapnam		Asianet		
2004	Kadamattathu Kathanaar	Maharajan	Asianet		
2005	Kayamkulam Kochunni	Anantharamarao	Surya TV		
2006	Suryaputhri		Asianet		
2006	Mandaram	Menon	Kairali TV		
2007	Ente Manasaputhri		Asianet		
2008-2009	Aa Amma	Mahadevan	Kairali TV		
2008	Devimahathmyam	Naranarayana Gowdar	Asianet		
2008-2009	Pakalmazha		Amrita TV		
2010-2012	Harichandanam	Venkidi Swami	Asianet		
2011-2012	kadhayile rajakumari		Mazhavil Manorama		
2011-2012	Manasaveena	Shivanandan	Mazhavil Manorama		
2012-2014	Pattu Saree	Kochettan	Mazhavil Manorama		
2014-2017	Chandanamazha	Devaraj desai	Asianet		
2015-2016	Mayamohini	Vishwanathan	Mazhavil Manorama		
2018	Makkal	Madhavan	Mazhavil Manorama		
2019	Mahaguru	Dr Prasad	Kaumudy TV		
2020	Namukku Paarkkuvan Munthirithoppukal	Police Officer	Surya TV		
2020	Koodathayi	Advocate	Flowers TV		
2020–2023	Padatha Painkili	Ananda Varma	Asianet	Replaced Prem Prakash	
2023-2024	Ennishtam Ninnishtam	Raj Mohan	Surya TV		
2024–present	Premam	Vasudevan	Pocket FM	Web series	
