= Mayamohini =

- Theatrical release poster
- Directed by: Jose Thomas
- Written by: Udaykrishna; Siby K. Thomas
- Produced by: Madhu Warrier; P. Sukumar
- Starring: Dileep; Biju Menon; Baburaj
- Cinematography: Anil Nair
- Edited by: Johnkutty
- Music by: Berny–Ignatius; Bijibal (Background Score)
- Production company: Color Factory
- Distributed by: Kalasangham Films; Manjunatha Release & PJ Entertainments Europe
- Release date: 7 April 2012
- Running time: 165 minutes
- Country: India
- Language: Malayalam
- Box office: ₹22 crore

Mayamohini is a 2012 Indian Malayalam-language black comedy film directed by Jose Thomas and written by Udayakrishna and Siby K. Thomas, starring Dileep in the title role with Biju Menon, Mohan Sharma, Baburaj, Raai Laxmi, Mythili and Spadikam George in supporting roles. Despite receiving mixed reviews from critics, the film was the highest grossing Malayalam film of the year. The movie was remade in Kannada as Jai Lalitha.

This movie generally received mixed reviews from the audience and was a blockbuster at the box office. It also became the highest grossing Malayalam movie of 2012.

== Plot ==
A plane accident occurs in which a small child narrowly escapes, while his parents are dead. He is then looked after by his maternal uncle Appukuttan Nair, and all the family's wealth will be inherited by him. As per their astrologer, in the future he should marry a young woman whose star is Chothi, only then will he prosper in life. The boy grows up to be a young man named Balakrishnan, who is unsuccessful in anything he does.

He falls in love with Maya, the daughter of a wealthy businessman named Raj Kumar Patella, who is settled in Mumbai. When Patella learns about their relationship, he objects and Maya elopes with Balakrishnan. In the meantime, Balakrishnan's friend Advocate Lakshminarayanan alias Lakshmi, tries to convince Appukuttan about the marriage and he agrees to visit the couple. But then, on the second day of the marriage Maya leaves him, due to a misunderstanding and returns to Mumbai.

Balakrishnan didn't want Appukuttan to know that Maya left him, so he hires a woman Mayamohini to act as his wife, but it is revealed that Mayamohini is actually a man named Mohanakrishnan, whom the cops had been searching for. He had been put into a trap by Patella's manager Sanjay. Mohan reveals his true identity to Balakrishnan and he agrees to help him in his quest of finding his father Shankaran Potti, a temple priest. They travel to Mumbai and there they meet Maya, who is actually a club dancer named Katreena. Though confronted, she tells that Pattela is actually a wanted international criminal and she was cheated by him years ago when being tricked to work in his company. In the flashback, it turns out that Shankaran Potti was actually killed by Pattela and Sanjay to get hold of their property. Pattela is opening a new business (which is a fraud company) in town and on the inauguration day has arranged some dance as well.

Mohan gets dressed up as Mayamohini again. Pattela invites 'her' to his room and tries to spend time with 'her'. In the meantime, the cops arrive to arrest Mohan. 'Mayamohini' reveals her true as Mohan to Pattela and confronts him, Sanjay and their henchmen with Balakrishnan's help. When one of Pattela's henchman tries to kill Balakrishnan, Sanjay gets accidentally killed. Mohan kills Pattela and avenges his father's death. Later, Mohan is released of his charges. Later, Lakshmi's family comes for an alliance with Mayamohini, not knowing the truth. His sister was also with him and her star is revealed to be Chothi much to the delight of Balakrishnan.

== Cast ==
- Dileep as Mayamohini /Mohanakrishnan Potti
- Biju Menon as Balakrishnan Nair
- Baburaj as Advocate Lakshmi Narayanan
- Mohan Sharma as Raj Kumar Pattala, the main antagonist
- Vijayaraghavan as Appukuttan Nair, Balakrishnan's maternal uncle
- Lakshmi Rai as Kathreena (Maya)
- Mythili as Sangeetha Raghavan
- Nedumudi Venu as Sankaran Potti, Mohan's father
- Spadikam George as SP "Tiger" Raghavan IPS, Sangeetha's father
- Unnikrishnan Namboothiri as Bhaskaran Nair
- Balachandran Chullikkad as Shankaradi Melpathoor
- Kalabhavan Shajon as Shishubalan
- Madhu Warrier as ACP Anwar IPS
- Joju George as CI John
- Aju Varghese as Keezh Shanthi Vishnu
- Kazan Khan as Sanjay Mishra, the secondary antagonist
- Kochu Preman as "Make up Man" Pappan Parapokkara
- Sadiq as Koshi
- Ponnamma Babu as Dr Susamma Antony
- Bindu Ramakrishnan as Lakshmi's mother
- Ambika Mohan as Saraswathi Antharjanam, Mohan's mother
- Radhika as Swathi
- V.K Baiju as Police Officer
- Naveen Arakkal as Police Officer
- Abu Salim as Benz George
- Santhosh Nair as Sub Registar
- Riyaz Khan (Special appearance in "Mayamohini" song)
- Nishanth Sagar (Special appearance in "Mayamohini" song)
- Mafia Sasi (Special appearance in "Mayamohini" song)
- Nandu Pothuval (Special appearance in "Mayamohini" song)
- Kalabhavan Haneef (Special appearance in "Mayamohini" song)
- Sajitha Betti as Shanthi

== Music ==
There are four tracks in the movie, Berny–Ignatius was music director.

=== Track listing ===
Song	Singer(s)	Music director	Notes
"Ullil Kothividarum"	Rimi Tomy	Berny–Ignatius	Starcast: Dileep, Biju Menon, Baburaj, Kalabhavan Shajohn
"Avanipadam Poothallo"	Biju Narayanan, Rimi Tomy Franco Simon,	Berny–Ignatius	Starcast: Dileep, Biju Menon, Baburaj, Mythili
"Harahara Shambho"	Afsal	Berny–Ignatius	Starcast: Dileep, Biju Menon, Baburaj
"Haath Le Le"	Sithara, Rony Philip	Berny–Ignatius	Starcast: Dileep, Laxmi Raai, Mythili, Biju Menon

== Reception ==
=== Critical response ===
Metro Matinee rated the film as Entertaining and said "Mayamohini certainly follows the same old formula, but even then it is a fairly enjoyable ride." Sify rated the film as a Comedy Caper and said "With a briskly paced first half and a more serious second half, Mayamohini still turn out to be a nice option, for the summer holidays."

=== Box office ===
The film was commercial success. The film grossed ₹16.5 crore from 25 days in Kerala box office. In 50 days it grossed ₹18 crore from Kerala box office. The film collected US$15,631 from UK box office. The film grossed a total of ₹22 crore from the box office.
