= Greetings (2004 film) =

- Directed by: Shajoon Karyal
- Written by: Mani Shornnur
- Produced by: Arun Ghosh
- Starring: Jayasurya; Kavya Madhavan; Innocent; Siddique; Abbas
- Cinematography: Sudhi
- Edited by: Harihara Puthran
- Music by: Raveendran
- Release date: 8 October 2004
- Country: India
- Language: Malayalam

Greetings is a 2004 Indian Malayalam film by Shajoon Karyal starring Jayasurya and Kavya Madhavan.

== Plot ==
While living with his widowed father (Aravindakshan Nair), Gopan falls in love with his neighbor, Sheethal. Together they try to reunite former sweethearts, Rangaswami Iyengar and Kasthuri, who are neighbours. A twist happens when a Chennai-born man, Swaminathan, sees Sheethal. How Gopan and Sheetal unite form the movie's remaining plot.

== Cast ==
- Jayasurya as Gopan Aravindakshan
- Kavya Madhavan as Sheethal
- Innocent as Aravindakshan Nair
- Abbas as Swaminathan
- Siddique as Rangaswami Iyengar
- Geetha as Kasthuri
- Salim Kumar as Vaidyanathan
- Subi Suresh as Sarojam
- Machan Varghese as Peethambaran
- Vinayakan as Hari
- Augustine as Somasundaran
