= Wanted (2004 film) =

- DVD cover
- Directed by: Murali Nagavally
- Written by: Chandra Sekhar Yeleti (story); Priyadarshan (dialogue)
- Screenplay by: Priyadarshan
- Produced by: A. Jayan
- Starring: Mohanlal; Madhu Warrier; Aravindan; Nishanth Sagar; Suchitra
- Cinematography: Om Prakash
- Edited by: K Sreenivas
- Music by: Deepak Chatterjee
- Production company: Aparna Films
- Release date: 17 July 2004
- Country: India
- Language: Malayalam

Wanted is a 2004 Indian Malayalam-language thriller film directed by Murali Nagavally (in his directorial debut) and written by Priyadarshan. The films stars Mohanlal in an extended cameo appearance alongwith an ensemble cast including Madhu Warrier, Aravindan, Anniyappan, Nishanth Sagar, and Suchitra. The film is a remake of the Telugu film Aithe (2003).

== Plot ==
Five unemployed youngsters plan a heist. Don Muhammed Ibrahim comes to the city where the youngsters are. How Narayana Swamy IPS brings the youngsters to justice and how the youngsters deal with Ibrahim form the rest of the story.

== Cast ==
- Mohanlal as SP Narayana Swamy IPS
- Madhu Warrier as Unni
- Aravind Akash as Nandhu (voiceover by Sarath Das)
- Nishanth Sagar as Mani
- Sujitha as Anu
- Sushovan Banerjee IPS as Muhammed Ibrahim aka Bhai, the main antagonist
- Jagathy Sreekumar as Supru Murthy
- Sreenivasan as Khader
- Vijayaraghavan as Nambiar
- Innocent as Unni's uncle
- Bharath Gopi as Anu's father
- Venu Nagavally as Krishnadas
- Captain Raju as Police Officer
- Vijayakumar as Srikanth
- Sukumari as Unni's mother
- Manka Mahesh as Sivakami
- Adithya Menon as Guru
- T. P. Madhavan as Politician
- KPAC Lalitha
- Abu Salim
- Nandu as Gopalakrishnan
- Aniyappan as Chupran

== Production ==
Murali Nagavally, who worked as an assistant to Priyadarshan, made his directorial debut with this film. Newcomers Madhu Warrier, Nishanth Sagar, Aravind, Anniyappan and Suchitha were cast in the lead. Mohanlal, who promised Nagavally that he will star in his directorial debut, made a cameo appearance as a police officer.

== Themes and influences ==
The film took into account the growing interests of the middle class in Kerala.

== Soundtrack ==
Music by Deepan Chatterjee and lyrics by Gireesh Puthencherry.

- "Changueduthukattiyal" - Anvar
- "Kallayipuzha" - Vineeth Sreenivasan, Aparna Jayan
- "Mizhithamara Poovil" - M. G. Sreekumar, Aparna Jayan
- "Omale Nee" - M. G. Sreekumar
- "Pon Veyile" - M. G. Sreekumar
- "Shlokam" - M. G. Sreekumar
- "Title Song" - Thara Thomas

== Release and reception ==
The film had a good opening at the box office thanks to the positive word of mouth and Mohanlal's cameo. The film released alongside Mayilattam and Kakkakarumban.

A critic from Sify gave the film a verdict of "good" and opined that "Director Murali has made the film like a Hollywood thriller. He has been able to extract powerful performances from the four young actors. Madhu Warrier is promising and Suchitha, a spitting image of Meera Jasmine is likeable. Anniyapan has scored in the comedy scenes".
