= Vadakkumnadhan =

2005 Indian film by Shajoon Kariyal

- Poster
- Directed by: Shajoon Kariyal
- Written by: Gireesh Puthenchery
- Produced by: Govindan Kutty
- Starring: Mohanlal; Padmapriya; Biju Menon; Kavya Madhavan
- Cinematography: S. Kumar
- Edited by: Hariharaputhran
- Music by: Raveendran; Ouseppachan (Score)
- Production company: Baba Creations
- Distributed by: Sagariga
- Release date: 19 May 2006
- Running time: 140 minutes
- Country: India
- Language: Malayalam

Vadakkumnadhan (Lord Shiva) is a 2006 Indian Malayalam-language psychological drama film directed by Shajoon Kariyal and written by Gireesh Puthenchery. It stars Mohanlal as Iringannoor Bharatha Pisharody, a university professor diagnosed with bipolar disorder. The film also features Padmapriya and Kavya Madhavan. The songs were composed by Raveendran, while Ouseppachan provided the background score.

The film is an unusual love story, focusing on mental health and tolerance towards it in society. Vadakkumnadhan, released on 19 May 2006, received wide critical acclaim. The film was a commercial success and one of the highest-grossing Malayalam films of the year. It ran for more than 100 days in theatres.

== Plot ==
Iringannoor Bharatha Pisharody, a professor at the Sanskrit University, is a knowledgeable man with a keen interest in the Vedas, Astrology, and Kathakali. He is the author of various critical works regarding Adi Shankara and winner of numerous awards. Meera is his fiancée by birth (murapennu), being the daughter of his maternal uncle, Balarama Pisharody, and also his student. Bharathan is diagnosed with bipolar disorder and hides it from his family. Due to the same reason, he does not encourage Meera's love for him.

Despite Bharathan's expressed dislike, both families agree to their wedding, and the dates are fixed. As the auspicious day dawns, Bharathan becomes desperate and leaves home. As the bride arrives for the wedding, she and her family realize to their utter dismay and desolation that the groom has disappeared. Gloom settles over the household, and Meera is inconsolable.

Years pass and Bharathan is considered to be dead as he sent notice as such to his family. He roams around the holy shrines of Haridwar, Kedarnath, Rishikesh, and Rudraprayag. One day, his mother and younger brother on a pilgrimage to the Hindu holy lands accidentally see Bharathan on the banks of the holy Ganges. They convince him to return, and his family is happy to have him back. His brother, Prabhakan (Biju Menon), is married and his sister, Bhama, is awaiting marriage proposals.

Bharathan does not seem right and people think he is addicted to drugs. He causes a scene in his college and at Bhama's engagement, insulting the groom and his father. Prabhakaran loses his cool and breaks his suitcase, only to find his reports from medical college saying that Bharathan has bipolar disorder. Bharatan admits to faking a drug addiction to hide his disorder. He says it is like slipping while walking; the mind slips from its normal self. He reveals that he went to Keezhpalli Narayanan Nambeesan and told him about his problem. The disorder is similar to suddenly carrying 100 people in a boat that is supposed to carry only four. His brain is crowded with too many thoughts. He tells Meera that marriage will be a disaster and this is why he decided to run away. Meera tells him that she will take care of him no matter what.

Bharathan sets about making things right. He apologizes at his college and to Bhama's groom asking him to marry her. They agree on the condition that he would not be attending. After a lot of struggle, Bharathan convinces Meera's father to give her hand to him in marriage. He later accepts a position as be Sanskrit professor at the college. The last scene shows them going on a pilgrimage to the Vadukkumnathan temple.

== Cast ==
- Mohanlal as Prof. Iringannoor Bharatha Pisharody
- Padmapriya as Meera, daughter of Balarama Pisharody ( voice by Sreeja Ravi )
- Biju Menon as Prabhakara Pisharody, brother of Bharatha Pisharody
- Kavya Madhavan as Bhama, sister of Bharathan (voice by Sreeja Ravi )
- Kaviyoor Ponnamma as Rugmavathi Amma, mother of Bharatha Pisharody
- Babu Namboothiri as astrologer Govinda Pisharody, maternal uncle of Bharatha Pisharody
- Murali as Balarama Pisharody, maternal uncle of Bharatha Pisharody
- Vineeth as Parameshwaran
- Rizabawa as Shankarankutty Master
- Shammi Thilakan as Vishwanathan
- Madambu Kunjukuttan as Sharmaji (Apputtan Nair)
- Sadiq as Gaffoor
- Sona Nair as Latha
- Sreeja Chandran as Lakshmi
- Bindu Ramakrishnan
- Freddy
- Ananthapadmanabhan as Keezhpally Narayanan Nambeesan
- Vijayan Peringodu as Ravunni Nair

== Soundtrack ==
Vadakkumnadhan

Soundtrack album by Raveendran
- Released: April 2006
- Recorded: 2004
- Studios: Pooja Sound Studios, Poonithura
- Genre: Film soundtrack
- Language: Malayalam
- Label: Johny Sagariga

Raveendran chronology
Kalabham (2006)	Vadakkumnadhan (2006)

This is the last movie work of Raveendran, before his demise. The lyrics were penned by Gireesh Puthenchery.

Track	Song title	Singer(s)	Raga:
1	"Introduction"	Mohanlal	
2	"Gange"	K. J. Yesudas	Madhyamavati
3	"Oru Kili"	K. J. Yesudas, K. S. Chithra	Jog
4	"Kalabham Tharaam"	K. S. Chithra	Pushpalathika
5	"Paahi Paramporule"	Manjari, Sindhu Premkumar, Raveendran	Hamsadhvani
6	"Kalabham Tharaam"	Biju Narayanan	Pushpalathika
7	"Saarasa Mukhi"	M. G. Sreekumar	Yadukulakamboji
8	"Oru Kili"	K. S. Chithra	Jog
9	"Rajani Janithaguru"	Govind Vivek	Abheri (Lyrics by Jayadeva)
10	"Neentidam Churunda"	Sankaran Namboothiri	Ragamalika
11	"Gange"	K. S. Chithra	Madhyamavati
12	"Thathaka Thathaka"	M. G. Sreekumar, Machad Vasanthi	Kapi, Kharaharapriya

== Reception ==
=== Box office ===
The film was a commercial success, becoming one of the highest-grossing Malayalam films of the year. It ran for more than 100 days in theatres.

=== Reviews ===
Manoj Rammohan of Deccan Herald wrote, "In this character, Mohanlal lives the role--be it a famous Sanskrit scholar, a respected teacher and even a rebel against the societial norms - whether in rejecting awards or slipping into isolation. As he comes back to his native place, a plethora of incidents and even a few accidents awaits him. He turns indifferent and even uncouth in his behaviour. Playing his lady love is Padma Priya . Many other people as uncles, friends and neighbours sail into the script."

== Awards ==
Filmfare Awards

- Best Male Playback Singer - Dr. K. J. Yesudas
- Best Female Playback Singer - K. S. Chithra
- Best Music Director - Raveendran (Posthumous)
- Best Lyricist - Gireesh Puthenchery
- Best Script Writer - Gireesh Puthenchery

Asianet Film Awards

- Best Music Director - Raveendran (Posthumous)
- Best Lyricist - Gireesh Puthenchery
- Best Actress - Padmapriya
