= Iruvattam Manavaatti =

- DVD cover
- Directed by: Sanal
- Written by: V. C. Ashok
- Starring: Kunchacko Boban; Kavya Madhavan
- Cinematography: S. G. Sreeram
- Edited by: K. P. Hariharaputhran
- Music by: Alphonse Joseph (songs); S. P. Venkatesh (Background Score)
- Release date: 4 February 2005
- Country: India
- Language: Malayalam

Iruvattam Manavaatti is a 2005 Indian Malayalam language political romantic film. The film stars Kunchacko Boban and Kavya Madhavan. This film is inspired by the Tamil film Run (2002), starring R. Madhavan and Meera Jasmine.

== Plot ==
The movie was based on the political background of Kannur. The movie was based on the life of a veterinary doctor Goutham and Bhoomika born in a strong communist family of Kannur. The movie deals with all the happenings after both of them fall in love.

== Cast ==
- Kunchacko Boban as Dr. Goutham
- Kavya Madhavan as Bhoomika
- Murali as Const. Ananthan
- Kalabhavan Mani as Koroth Raghavan MLA / Koroth Krishnan
- Sethu Lakshmi as Koroth Madhavi
- Indrans as Attender Chandrappan / Prabhudeva
- Harisree Ashokan as Susheelan
- Nishanth Sagar as Dr. Sudheer
- Madhu Warrier as Hareedran
- Salim Kumar as Ochira Velu
- Cochin Haneefa as Ambujakshan/ Ambiyannan
- Kalarenjini as Bhoomika's mother
- Bindhu Panicker as Chandramathi
- Ambika Mohan
- Mani C. Kappan as Bharathan
- Krishna Prasad
- Rani Larius as Rathnam/Rathnamma

== Soundtrack ==
The songs were composed by Alphons Joseph. The lyrics were written by Beeyar Prasad.

1. "Veenayaakumo" - Sujatha Mohan, Sreenivas
2. Ponnum Jamanthippoovum" - M. G. Sreekumar
3. "Vidarum Varna Pookkal" - Afsal, Vidhu Prathap
4. "Gaanamanu Njan" - Sujatha Mohan, Sreenivas
5. "Kanneeril Pidayum" - Alphonse Joseph

== Reception ==
A critic from Sify wrote that "But pray, why do Malayalam directors try to ape Tamil and Bollywood films shamelessly?" A critic from webindia123 wrote that "Even though movie lacks reality, it has some entertainment value". The film ended up as a box-office disaster.
