= Dreamz (2000 film) =

Dreams
- DVD Cover
- Directed by: Shajoon Karyal
- Written by: Babu Janardhan
- Produced by: Kerala Pictures (Sabu Cherian, M. A. Nishad)
- Starring: Suresh Gopi; Meena; Rahman; Abbas
- Cinematography: P.Sukumar
- Edited by: Ranjan Abraham
- Music by: Vidyasagar
- Distributed by: Kokers, Vismaya, Megastar
- Release date: 29 July 2000
- Running time: 142 minutes
- Country: India
- Language: Malayalam

Dreams is a 2000 Indian Malayalam mystery thriller film directed by Shajoon Karyal. The film stars Suresh Gopi, Meena, Rahman and Abbas. The movie is directed by Shajoon Kariyal and produced by Kerala Pictures. The music is composed by Vidyasagar.

== Plot ==
Nirmala Mathan seeks vengeance for the mysterious death of her lover Shiva. Nirmala suspect Dr. Roy, who wanted to marry her.

== Cast ==
- Suresh Gopi as Dr. Roy P John
- Meena as Nirmala Mathen / Anna Anthony Nediyarakala
- Abbas as Shiva
- Rahman as SP Peter IPS
- Srividya as Thankam
- Janardhanan as Thottathil Mathen, Nirmala's father
- Jagathy Sreekumar as Dr. Sugunan
- Jagadeesh as Pachathullan
- Sadiq as SI Mohammed Basheer
- Subair as Pappachan (Brother-in-law of Roy)
- Reshmi Soman as Shyama Narayanan
- Reena as Reetha
- Sindhu as Anupama P John
- Jose Pellissery
- Kazan Khan

== Reception ==
The film was not a box office success. Despite being technically well-made, Karyal stated that he felt forced to compromise on the climax of the film.

== Soundtrack ==
Music: Vidyasagar, Lyrics: Gireesh Puthenchery. All songs were chartbusters, and the song "Manimuttathavani Panthal" was widely used in memes depicting Suresh Gopi in 2024.

Song	Artist(s)	Raga(s)	Length
"Manimuttathavani panthal"	K. J. Yesudas, Sujatha Mohan	Darbari Kanada	
"Ee Parakkum"	K. J. Yesudas, K. S. Chithra		
"Kannil Kaashithumba"	P. Jayachandran, Gayatri Asokan	Mohanam	
"Pakkaala Paadan Vaa"	Shankar Mahadevan	Kharaharapriya	
"Raathriyil"	Sujatha Mohan	Natta	4:41
"Vaarthinkal Thellalle"	Swarnalatha	Mohanam	5:13
"Vaarthinkal Thellalle"	K. J. Yesudas	Mohanam	5:13
