= Ravanan (2006 film) =

- Directed by: Jojo Varghese
- Written by: Biju Devassey
- Produced by: M. Mani
- Starring: Kalabhavan Mani; Jagathy Sreekumar; Megha Jasmine
- Cinematography: Venugopal
- Music by: M. Jayachandran
- Production company: Sunitha Productions
- Distributed by: Aroma Release
- Release date: 18 August 2006
- Country: India
- Language: Malayalam

Ravanan is a 2006 Malayalam action thriller directed by debutante Jojo Varghese with Kalabhavan Mani in the lead. Jagathy Sreekumar, Megha Jasmine, Madhu Warrier, Sudheesh, Nishant Sagar, Sreejith, Kollam Thulasi, Madhu, and Rajan P. Dev play the other pivotal roles.

== Cast ==
- Kalabhavan Mani as Varghese Antony IPS aka Ravanan, Superintendent of Police, Crime Branch
- Jagathy Sreekumar as SI Sundaram
- Madhu Warrier as Rajeev Warrier
- Nishant Sagar as Vinod Kumar
- Sudheesh as Sibi Kurian
- Rajan P Dev as IG Raman Menon IPS
- Madhu as Chief Minister Harishankaran
- Megha Jasmine as Radhika Menon
- Anil Murali as CI Sreekumar
- Girija Preman
- Kalady Jayan
- Kollam Thulasi as P.K Sukumaran
- Sreejith Ravi as Madhavan Menon
- Indulekha as Renuka
- Jayakrishnan as DYSP Prakash Menon
- Ravi Vallathol as Judge Raghava Menon
- Augustine as Minister Krishnakumar
- Ajay Ratnam as R. Krishna Moorthy (R.K)
- Baburaj as Jamal
- Monilal as Sivankutty
- Sadiq as CI Eswara Warrier
- Nandu as Shanavas
