= Thachiledathu Chundan =

- Directed by: Shajoon Karyal
- Written by: Babu Janardhanan
- Produced by: Thampi Kannanthanam
- Starring: Mammootty; Nandini; Thilakan; Nedumudi Venu; Captain Raju; Kaveri
- Cinematography: Saloo George; Sanjeev Sankar; Sree Sankar
- Edited by: J. Murali Narayanan
- Music by: Raveendran; S. P. Venkatesh(BGM)
- Production company: Jooliya Pictures
- Release date: 1999
- Running time: 160 minutes
- Country: India
- Language: Malayalam
- Box office: ₹2 crore

Thachiledathu Chundan is a 1999 Indian Malayalam-language action drama film directed by Shajoon Karyal and written by Babu Janardhanan and produced by Thampi Kannanthanam under the banner of Jooliya Pictures. The film stars Mammootty in the lead role, along with Nandini, Thilakan, Nedumudi Venu, Captain Raju and Kaveri in supporting roles. The film revolves a boatrace fantic, Kochu Kunju. The film features original songs composed by Raveendran, with the background score done by S. P. Venkatesh. The lyrics were written by Bichu Thirumala. The film was released on 1 April 1999 on the occasion of Vishu. The film was commercial success . The film was director Shajoon Karyal's breakthrough in Malayalam cinema.

== Cast ==
- Mammootty as Kochu Kunju/Ashokan Nair
- Nandini as Usha
- Thilakan as Vikraman Nair
- Nedumudi Venu as Vasukutty
- Vani Viswanath as Ambika
- Kaveri as Indu
- C P Prathapan as Koonanthanam Nair
- Captain Raju as Velupillai
- Vijayakumar as Murali
- Meghanathan as Uthaman
- Augustine as Kamalahasan
- Kollam Thulasi as Advocate Chellappan
- Manka Mahesh
- Sadiq as Balachandran
- Latha
- V. K. Sriraman as Sekharan
- Sathaar as Geevarghese
- Azeez as Kannappan
- Jagannathan as Raghavan Nair
- Mohan Jose as Chenkeeri
- Kundara Johny as Thankayya Mooppan
- Alphonse as Dancer
- Anish paul as CI Balan Pillai (police)

== Soundtrack ==
The film includes songs composed by Raveendran, with lyrics by Bichu Thirumala. The background score was composed by S. P. Venkatesh.

Track	Title	Singer(s)	Notes
1	"Aalappuzha Vaazhum"	K. J. Yesudas	Raga: Aarabhi, Anandabhairavi
2	"Kaduvaye Kiduva"	K. J. Yesudas	Raga:Bowli
3	"Kallan Chakkettu"	K. J. Yesudas, K. S. Chithra	Raga: Lalitha
4	"Kallan Chakkettu"	K. J. Yesudas	Raga: Mukhari
5	"Shaivasankethame"	K. J. Yesudas	
6	"Shokamookamaay"	K. S. Chithra	Raga: Chenchurutti
7	"Shokamookamaayi"	K. J. Yesudas	Raga: Anandabhairavi
8	"They They Cholli"	K. J. Yesudas	Raga: Aarabhi, Anandabhairavi

== Reception ==
The year 1999 was a turbulent year for Malayalam cinema, with an all-time low production of 60 films, which is low compared to films produced in 1997, which had more than a 100 films. In 1999, 45 films of the 60 films bombed at the box office, with approximately only 10 films reaping good profits. Thachiledathu Chundan was one of the few films that was successful at the box office. The film was the third highest-grossing film of the year, earning 7 crore from the box office in its final run. The film was only surpassed by Friends and Pathram.
