= Ettekaal Second =

2014 Indian Malayalam-language film by Kanakaraghavan

- Film poster
- Directed by: Kanakaraghavan
- Produced by: Santhosh Babusenan
- Starring: Govind Padmasoorya; Miya
- Cinematography: Vipin Chandran; Sinu Sidharth
- Music by: K Santhosh
- Release date: 28 February 2014
- Country: India
- Language: Malayalam

Ettekaal Second (transl. Eight-and-a-quarter second) is a 2014 Indian Malayalam-language romantic drama film directed by Kanakaraghavan starring Govind Padmasoorya and Miya.

== Cast ==
- Govind Padmasoorya as Sandeep S Nair (Sandu)
- Miya as Neethu
- Madhu as Menon, Neethu's grandfather
- Urmila Unni as Neethu's mother
- Vijayaraghavan as Sandeeps' father
- Suraj Venjaramoodu as Sandeep's uncle
- P. Sreekumar
- Nandu
- Rohit Vijayan
- Janardanan
- Kollam Thulasi

== Production ==
The film is titled Ettekaal Second because according to scientists if a man eyes a woman for eight-and-a-quarter-second, then that man is in love with the woman.

== Soundtrack ==
The songs are composed by K Santhosh. The song "Katharamam" was shot underwater. The film had the longest pictured song underwater for an Indian film at the time of its release. The entire song was filmed underwater. The underwater sequence was directed by Vinod Vijayan.

- "Katharamam" - K. S. Chitra, Karthik (written by Rafeeq Ahamed)
- "Vida Parayumen" - Vijay Yesudas

== Reception ==
The Times of India gave the film two out of five stars and wrote that "However none of the scenes stand out simply because they appear squeezed in solely for the purpose of creating tenderness in a film built with clichés".
