= Nishanth Sagar =

Indian actor (born 1980)

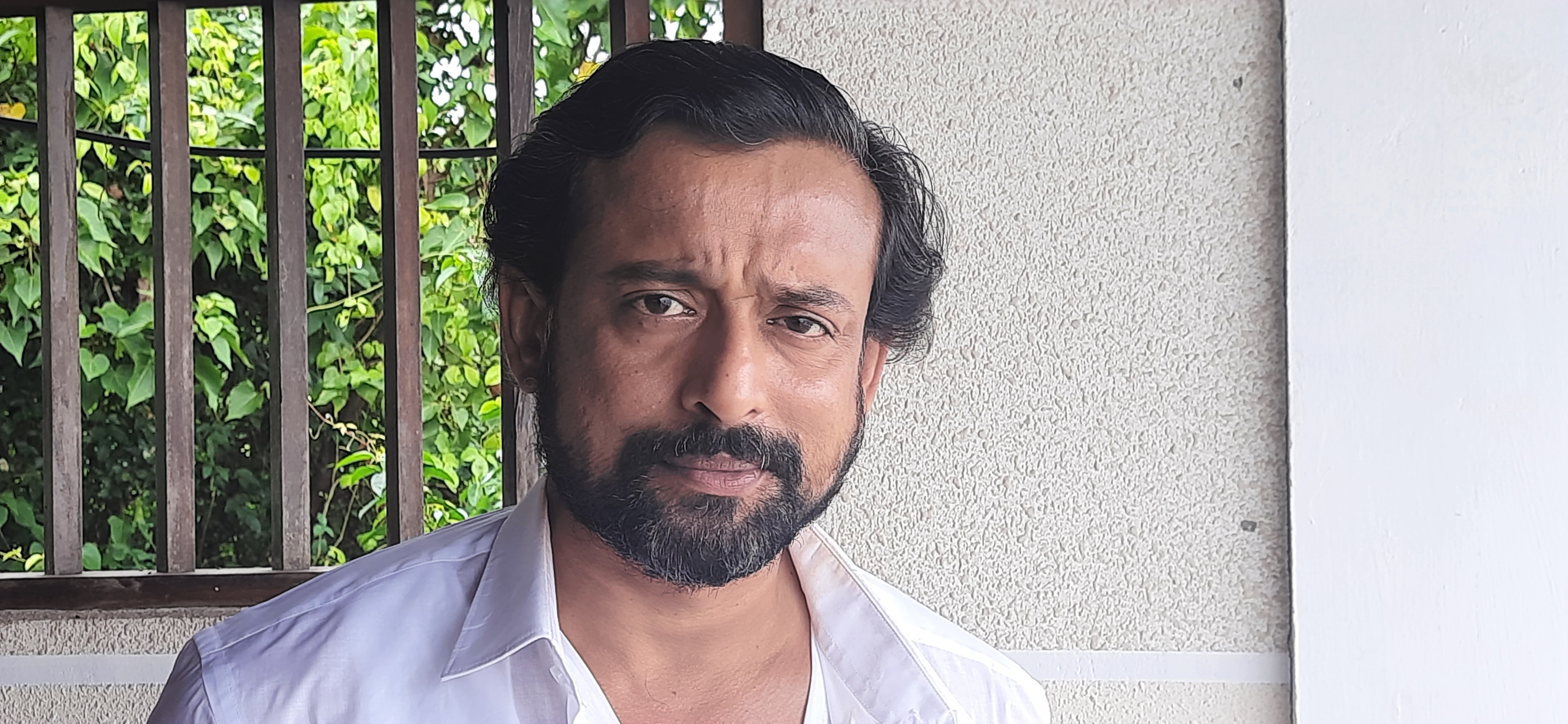
- Born: Nishanth Balakrishnan; 1980 (age 45–46); Thodupuzha, Kerala, India
- Occupation: Actor
- Years active: 1997–present
- Spouse: Vrinda
- Children: 2

Nishanth Balakrishnan (born 8 June 1980), known professionally by his stage name Nishanth Sagar pronounced [nɪˈʃaːnth sˈaɡə], is an Indian actor who works primarily in the Malayalam film industry. He has acted in over 50 films.

== Career ==
Nishant Sagar made his Malayalam film debut in 1997 with Vijay P Nair's unreleased Ezhunilappanthal. However, his most notable role came in the 1999 film Devadasi, directed by Biju Varkey. He was then pursuing his graduation. He got a breakthrough in 2000 when Lohithadas cast him in Joker along with Dileep. In 2008, he has acted in an Indo-American movie named Pirate's Blood with Sunny Leone in the lead role, although the film was not released in India owing to distribution problems. Other than Joker, he is mainly noted for his role in Thilakkam as Gopi.

== Filmography ==
Year	Title	Role	Notes
1999	Devadasi	Mahi	Debut film
1999	Rishivamsham	Krishnan	
2000	Joker	Sudheer Mishra	
2000	Manassil Oru Manjuthulli	Manoj	
2000	Indriyam	Sunny	
2001	Nalacharitham Naalam Divasam	Nandu	
2001	Kakki Nakshatram	SI Achuthankutty	
2002	Phantom	Josekutty	
2003	Thilakkam	Gopi	
2003	Lesa Lesa	Sekhar	Tamil film
2003	Anyar		
2003	Shingari Bolona	Jayakrishnan	
2003	Pulival Kalyanam	Ramesh Prasad	
2004	Rasikan	Arjun Ram	
2004	Freedom	Majeed	
2004	Wanted	Mani	
2005	Lokanathan IAS	Aravindan	
2005	Iruvattam Manavaatti	Dr.Sudhir	
2006	Kisan	Ambadi	
2006	Pachakuthira	College Student	
2006	Pathaaka	Murugadas	
2006	Ravanan	Vinod Kumar	
2007	Soorya Kireedam	Goutham	
2008	Pakal Nakshatrangal	Thushar	
2008	Chandranilekkoru Vazhi	Chandran	
2008	Thirakkatha	Kevin Paul	
2008	One Way Ticket	Bhadran	
2008	Kovalam	Christy	
2008	Aayudham	Saajan/Yunus Mohammad	
2008	Mayakazhcha	Aravinda Varma	
2008	Gulmohar	Kuriakose	
2008	Pirate's Blood	Sagar	
2009	Swa Le	Sandeep Jadeja	
2010	9 KK Road	Unnikrishnan	
2010	Kaaryasthan	Anand	
2010	Punyam Aham	Georgekutty	
2011	The Metro	Freddy	
2012	Face2Face	George Joseph	
2012	Mayamohini		Special appearance in the title song
2012	Banking Hours 10 to 4	Thief	
2012	Veeraputhran	Odayathil	
2012	Mullassery Madhavan Kutty Nemom P. O.	Viswanathan	
2013	101 Chodyangal	Radhakrishnan	
2013	Players (film)	Aji	
2014	Mosayile Kuthira Meenukal	Hashim	
2014	Angry Babies in Love	Anwar	
2014	Villali Veeran		
2014	The Dolphins	Biju	
2015	Rudrasimhaasnam	Harikrishnan	
2016	Koppayile Kodumkattu	Rahul	
2017	Sakhavu	Tony Manakkal	
2018	Johny Johny Yes Appa	Police Officer Sathyan	
2019	Under World	Mani	
2019	Valiya Perunnal	Noushad	
2021	One	Shine Thomas	
2022	Chathuram	Adv. Roni Sacheria	
2022	Kochaal	Sunny	
2022	Aanaparambile World Cup	Najeem	
2023	Djinn	Anvar Ibrahim	
2023	Masquerade	Mahesh Nair	TV Mini Series
2023	RDX: Robert Dony Xavier	Davis	
2023	Garudan	Nari Suni	
2024	Anweshippin Kandethum	Member Koruth	
2024	Turbo	Nikhil	
2025	Rekhachithram	DYSP Mohandas	
2025	Lokah Chapter 1: Chandra	Prakash	
2025	Haal (film)		
2025	Thelivu Sahitham		
2025	Dheeram	Jose	
2026	Prathichaya	Tobin Varghese	
2026	I, Nobody	Anas's brother-in-law	
