= Kaaliyan =

- Directed by: S. Mahesh Gurukkal
- Written by: B. T. Anil Kumar
- Produced by: Rajeev Govindan
- Starring: Prithviraj Sukumaran; Sathyaraj
- Cinematography: Sujith Vaassudev
- Music by: Ravi Basrur
- Country: India
- Language: Malayalam

Kaaliyan is an upcoming Indian Malayalam-language period drama film directed by S. Mahesh Gurukkal in his directorial debut and produced by Rajeev Govindan. It stars Prithviraj Sukumaran. The film is based on Kunchirakkotu Kali Nair, a 17th-century warrior.

== Plot ==
The film Kaaliyan features the story of Kunchirakkottu Kali Nair, a 17th-century warrior who lived in Venad. He was a loyal follower of the famous warrior Iravikkutty Pillai. Despite Iravikkutty Pillai becoming a historical figure, Kaaliyan remained relatively unknown. The movie revolves around the incidents and stories that happen there after.

== Cast ==
- Prithviraj Sukumaran as Kunchirakkottu Kali Nair "Kaaliyan"
- Sathyraj as Iravikkutty Pillai
- Nitish Nirmal as Friends
- Balachandran Chullikkad
- Kulappulli Leela
- Grace Antony
- Tini Tom
- Sunny Wayne
- Lal
- Siddique
- Manju Warrier

== Production ==
Gurukkal has helmed the documentary "Lifesketch of Sree Narayana Guru", that won him the Kerala State Television Award for direction. He launched himself as feature film director with Kaaliyan, starring Prithviraj Sukumaran and Sathyraj.
