= Lalitham Sundaram =

2022 Malayalam family drama film by Madhu Warrier

- Official release poster
- Directed by: Madhu Warrier
- Written by: Pramod Mohan
- Produced by: Manju Warrier; Kochumon
- Starring: Biju Menon; Manju Warrier; Saiju Kurup; Deepti Sati; Anu Mohan
- Cinematography: P. Sukumar; Gautham Sankar
- Edited by: Lijo Paul
- Music by: Bijibal
- Production companies: Manju Warrier Productions; Century Films
- Distributed by: Disney+ Hotstar
- Release date: 18 March 2022
- Running time: 120 minutes
- Country: India
- Language: Malayalam

Lalitham Sundaram (transl. Simple Is Beautiful) is a Malayalam-language comedy-drama film directed by Madhu Warrier (in his directorial debut). The film stars Biju Menon, Manju Warrier, Saiju Kurup, Deepti Sati and Anu Mohan. Manju Warrier co-produced the film with Kochumon under the banner Manju Warrier Productions. The film released on 18 March 2022 directly through Disney+ Hotstar.

== Synopsis ==
Sunny, Annie, and their younger brother, Jerry, are disconnected from their family due to their busy schedule. The siblings reunite for their mother's death anniversary and decide to fulfill her last wish. This reunion leads to a series of hilarious incidents that eventually help them repair their dysfunctional familial bonds.

== Cast ==
- Biju Menon as Sunny Mary Das, elder son
- Manju Warrier as Annie Mary Das, middle child
- Anu Mohan as Jerry Mary Das a.k.a. Kunjan, youngest child
- Raghunath Paleri as Das
- Saiju Kurup as Sandeep, Annie's husband and Sunny's brother-law
- Deepti Sati as Simy, Jerry's girlfriend
- Sudheesh as Rajesh, Sunny's friend
- Remya Nambeesan as Sophia, Sunny's wife
- Zarina Wahab as Mary Das
- Madhu Warrier as Doctor
- Nandu as Music Director Harikumar
- Vinod Thomas as Xavier
- Anjana Appukuttan as Lisy
- Thennal Abhilash as Rukmini a.k.a. Rukku, Annie's daughter
- Ashwin Warrier as Paul, Annie's son
- Ambika Mohan as Sister Maria
- Asha Aravind as Priya
- Kumar Sethu as Mahesh

== Production ==
=== Pre-production ===
The film was announced by Mammootty and Mohanlal on their respective social media accounts in January 2020. The puja of the film was on February 18, 2020.

P Sukumar did the cinematography for the film along with Gautham Sankar and Lijo Paul handled the editing. Bineesh Chandran is the art director of the movie, and Sakhi Elsa is the costume designer. The National Film Award-winning choreographer, Kala Master, is the dance choreographer of the movie.

=== Filming ===
The principal photography of the film began in February 2020 at Peermade and Vandiperiyar The film was planned to be shot on a single schedule, but the shooting came to a sudden halt due to the COVID-19 pandemic in March 2020. The crew had completed about half of the shooting before the lockdown. After about nine month of lockdown, the shooting was resumed in December 2020. As there was a long gap between the two schedules, the director says that all the actors had to begin from the scratch again. The second schedule was shot in Peermade and Ernakulam. The filming was wrapped up in January 2021.

== Music ==
Bijibal is the music director of this film, and B.K.Harinarayanan is the lyricist.

== Release ==
Lalitham Sundaram was released on 18 March 2022. The film was initially planned to be released in July 2020, but was postponed due to the COVID-19 pandemic. Then, it was slated for multiple times, including April 2021, August 2021, September 2021, and January 2022, but failed due to ongoing COVID-19 pandemic. On 26 February 2022, it was announced that the film would be skipping its theatrical release and taken to direct-to-digital release on Disney+ Hotstar.
