= Sadiq (Indian actor) =

Indian actor

- Born: Muhammed Sadiq; Thrissur, Kerala, India
- Occupation: Actor
- Years active: 1987–present
- Spouse: Shajitha
- Children: 2

Muhammed Sadiq is an Indian actor working in Malayalam cinema. He has acted in more than 500 Malayalam films. He predominantly appears in both supporting and villain roles. He was a theatre artist before making his film debut in the 1987 film Uppu.

== Personal life ==
Sadiq was born to Hamza and Khadeeja at Thrissur, Kerala. He studied in CMS Boys School, Thrissur. He is married to Shajitha, who works as a practitioner of homeopathy. They have two daughters, Rubina and Thamanna. Thamanna sang a few lines in the song Vellaaram Kannulla from the 2014 Malayalam movie Vellimoonga.

== Filmography ==
List of Sadiq film credits
Year	Title	Role	Notes
1987	Uppu	Salim	
1987	Kanikanum Neram	Nandhu	
1988	Theerathinariyumo Thirayude Vedana		
1989	Alicinte Anveshanam		
1989	Mudra		
1990	Samrajyam	James	
1991	Kadinjool Kalyanam	Mandhan Prakashan	
1991	Post Box No.27		
1991	Kanalkkattu		
1991	Mimics Parade	Stephen Cherian	
1992	Ayalathe Adheham		
1992	Kunukkitta Kozhi	Henchman	
1992	Neelakurukkan		
1992	Kasarkode Khaderbai	Stephen Cherian	
1993	Journalist		
1993	Sthalathe Pradhana Payyans	Sathyan	
1993	Ekalavyan	Anto	
1993	Padaleeputhram		
1994	City Police	Rajan	
1994	Kadal		
1994	Kambolam		
1994	Sudhamadalam		
1994	Pingami	Studio owner	
1994	Commissioner	Sugunan	
1994	Rudraksham	CI Ramanathan	
1994	Manathe Kottaram	Thomas Pettah/Thommichen	
1995	Nirnayam	Anil	
1995	Oru Abhibhashakante Case Diary	DYSP Bahuleyan	
1995	Chantha		
1995	Rajakeeyam		
1995	Arabikadalodam		
1995	The King	Ibrahim Jalal	
1995	Kokkarakko		
1995	Alancheri Thamprakkal	Gopan	
1995	Sipayi Lahala	Planter Ravi	
1996	Hitlist		
1996	King Solomon		
1996	Kanjirapally Kariyaachan		
1996	Mahathma	Sukumaran	
1996	Indraprastham		
1996	Isthamaanu Nooruvattam		
1996	Kalyana Sougandhikam	Raghavan	
1996	Rajaputhran	Prathap Menon	
1996	Kanchanam	SP John Scaria	
1996	Aayiram Naavulla Ananthan	Renjith Abraham	
1996	Mookkilla Raajyathu Murimookkan Raajaavu		
1996	Thooval Kottaram		
1996	Mr Clean		
1997	Killikurissiyile Kudumbamela		
1997	Chandralekha	Venu	
1997	Asuravamsam	Police Inspector	
1997	Shobhanam		
1997	Suvarna Simhaasanam		
1997	Lelam	Kunnel Chandy	
1997	Sankeerthanam Pole	Ravi	
1997	Varnapakittu	Kunjoonju	
1997	Aaraam Thampuran	Balarama Varma	
1997	Kannur		
1997	Newspaper Boy		
1998	Meenakshi Kalyanam	Vishwanathan	
1998	Sundarakilladi		
1998	Summer in Bethlehem	Chandrappan	
1998	Oru Maravathoor Kanavu	Jimmy	
1998	The Truth	Peter	
1998	Kudumba Vaarthakal	Narendran	
1998	Aaghosham		
1998	Anuragakottaram		
1998	British Market		
1998	Manthrikumaran	Raghavan	
1998	Manthri Maalikayil Manasammatham	Alex's brother	
1999	Garshom	Aravindan	
1999	Ustaad	Police Superintendent	
1999	Independence	Govindan	
1999	Captain	Circle Inspector Antony	
1999	Aayiram Meni	Keshavan	
1999	Ezhupunna Tharakan	Ajayan	
1999	Chandranudikkunna Dikkil	Ashokan	
1999	Thachiledathu Chundan	Balachandran	
1999	The Godman	Bhaskaran	
2000	Mark Antony		
2000	Narasimham	Govindankutty	
2000	Kannadikadavathu		
2000	Sathyameva Jayathe	DYSP Ramavarma Thampan IPS	
2000	Daivathinte Makan	Police Officer	
2000	Sahayathrikakku Snehapoorvam		
2000	Summer Palace		
2000	Dreams	SI Mohammed Basheer	
2000	Dada Sahib	Balram	
2000	Valliettan	Adv. Bharathan Marar	
2001	Unnathangalil	Raghuraman	
2001	Chithrathoonukal		
2001	Sravu	Cholaparamban	
2001	Rakshasa Rajavu	CI Rajan	
2001	Akashathile Paravakal		
2001	Andolanam		
2001	Saivar Thirumeni	Neelakandan	
2001	Nariman	SI Chandradas	
2001	Randam Bhavam	S. I. Sudhakaran Nair	
2002	Kayamkulam Kanaram		
2002	Thandavam	MLA Jayasingam	
2002	India Gate		
2002	Nandanam	Vijayan	
2002	Stop Violence	C.I. Shekharan	
2002	Chathurangam	District Collector Sajan Peter	
2002	Neelalakasham Niraye		
2003	Kasthooriman	Jacob	
2003	Sadanandante Samayam	Gopinathan	
2003	Mizhi Randilum		
2003	The King Maker Leader		
2003	War and Love	Naik Haneefa	
2003	Pattanathil Sundaran	Mathews	
2004	Kerala House Udan Vilpanakku	Idiyan Thoma	
2004	Mayilattam		
2004	Black	Mustafa	
2004	Perumazhakkalam	Najeeb	
2005	Deepangal Sakshi		
2005	Pathinonnil Vyazham	Victor Williams	
2005	Kochi Rajavu	Karimbarakkal Sudhakaran	
2005	Ben Johnson		
2005	Udayon	Mathai	
2005	Lokanathan IAS	Minister Divakaran	
2005	The Tiger	Shakthivel	
2005	Boyy Friennd	Alex Paul	
2005	Achante Ponnumakkal		
2006	Pakal		
2006	Vaasthavam	C.K. Nair	
2006	Prajapathi	Latheef	
2006	Rashtram	Abdullah	
2006	Ravanan	CI Eswar Warrier	
2006	Thuruppugulan	Govindan	
2006	Balram vs. Tharadas	Rafeeq	
2006	Baba Kalyani	Murali	
2006	Vadakkumnadhan	Gaffoor	
2006	Kilukkam Kilukilukkam	Balaji	
2006	Achanurangatha Veedu		
2006	Red Salute	Rajashekharan	
2006	Yes Your Honour		
2006	November Rain	Peter	
2007	Inspector Garud	Sub Inspector Shekharan	
2007	Katha Parayumpol	Police Officer	
2007	Chocolate	Police Officer	
2007	Avan Chandiyude Makan	Paulachan	
2007	Athisayan	Police Officer	
2007	Payum Puli	Advocate	
2007	Arabikkatha	Abbas	
2007	Nasrani	CPO Aboobacker	
2008	Jubilee		
2008	One Way Ticket	CI George Kurian	
2008	Malayali	Narendran	
2008	Cycle	Bhargavan	
2008	Aayudham	ACP Suresh	
2008	Perumaal		
2008	Kerala Police		
2008	Kanichukulangarayil CBI	Ratheesh	
2008	Crazy Gopalan	Ambadi Krishnan Nair	
2008	Twenty:20	C.I. Harish	
2009	Pramukhan		
2009	Evidam Swargamanu	Sudhakaran	
2009	Swantham Lekhakan	Mukundan	
2009	Patham Adhyayam	Jayachandra Varma	
2009	Colours		
2009	Samastha Keralam PO	Subair	
2009	Black Dalia	James	
2010	Happy Husbands		
2010	Drona 2010		
2010	Pokkiriraja	SI Raveendranath	
2010	Shikkar	Basheer	
2010	Penpattanam	Santhosh	
2010	Kaaryasthan	Puthezhathu Madhavan	
2010	9 KK Road	Mukundan Menon	
2010	Pathinonnil Vyazham	Victor Williams	
2010	Again Kasargod Khader Bhai	Jail Superintendent Joseph Palathingal	
2011	Veeraputhran		
2011	Ulakam Chuttum Valiban		
2011	Indian Rupee		
2011	The Metro	SI Vishwam	
2011	Bhakthajanangalude Sradhakku		
2011	Bombay March 12		
2011	Vellaripravinte Changathi		
2011	Navagatharkku Swagatham		
2012	Hero	C.I. Haridas	
2012	Masters	C.I. Bineesh	
2012	Mayamohini	Koshi	
2012	Veendum Kannur		
2012	Madirasi		
2012	Scene Onnu Nammude Veedu		
2012	Achante Aanmakkal	Narayanan	
2012	Perinoru Makan		
2012	Thappana		
2012	Jawan of Vellimala		
2012	Chettayees	Satheesh	
2012	Chapters	Krishna Kumar's father	
2013	Dolls	Paramu Paniker	
2013	Orissa		
2013	Cowboy		
2013	Lisammayude Veedu		
2013	Vallatha Pahayan	Bank Manager	
2013	Proprietors: Kammath & Kammath	Sub Inspector	
2013	Hotel California	Ali	
2013	North 24 Kaatham	Minister	
2014	Koottathil Oraal		
2014	120 Minutes		
2014	The Dolphins		
2014	Praise The Lord	Kuttappan	
2014	Vikramadithyan	Ravi	
2014	God's Own Country		
2014	Polytechnic		
2014	Bhaiyya Bhaiyya	S.I. Satheesh	
2014	Njaan		
2014	3 Wikkattinu 365 Runs		
2014	Mylanchi Monchulla Veedu	Ameer Rahman	
2014	The Reporter	Thomas	
2014	Ring Master	Cultural Minister Sudhindran	
2015	Kanal		
2015	Utopiayile Rajavu	Ramakrishnan	
2015	Rajamma @ Yahoo	Manjapra Vasu	
2015	Sir C. P.	Kuruvilla	
2015	Madhura Naranga	Jamal	
2015	Mariyam Mukku	Earnest	
2015	Yathra Chodikkathe	Maniyappan	
2015	Fireman	Chellappan	
2015	Loham		
2015	Nee-Na	Dr. Balachandran	
2016	Ameya		
2016	Maanam Thelinju		
2016	Puthiya Niyamam	Dayanandan Mash	
2016	Kuttikalundu Sookshikkuka		
2016	Oru Murai Vanthu Parthaya	Shivan	
2017	Masterpiece	Arun Dev	
2017	Sherlock Toms	Sadashivan P.K.	
2017	Role Models	Ravi	
2017	Ramaleela	Rajendran	
2017	Alamara	Pankajakshan	
2018	Lolans		
2018	Shikkari Shambhu	Joji	
2018	Nimisham		
2018	Maayavanam Bunglow		
2018	Kayamkulam Kochunni		
2018	Joseph		
2019	My Santa		
2019	Mera Naam Shaji	Gopakumar	
2019	Neeyum Njanum		
2019	Snehakoodu		
2019	Thrissur Pooram	George	
2019	Varkey		
2019	Jack & Daniel	Ramettan	
2019	Porinju Mariam Jose	Muyalan Chandy	
2019	Ganagandharvan	Judge Sandeep	
2020	Anjaam Pathiraa	Dr. Sreekanth	
2021	One	Sameer Kallayi, MLA Opposition	
2021	Nizhal	Michael	
2021	Kaaval	Head Constable Aravindakshan	
2021	Kurup	SP Kabeer IPS	
2022	Andal		
2022	Two Men		
2022	Pyali		
2022	Aanandam Paramanandam	Security	
2023	Garudan	SP Jayadevan	
2024	Anweshippin Kandethum	Retired Constable Raveendran Nair	
2025	Khajuraho Dreams	Gautham Father	

== Television serials ==
- Maya (Sun TV) - Tamil
- Mohapakshikal (Kairali TV)
- Bhagyadevatha (Mazhavil Manorama)
- MT Kadhakal (Amrita TV)
- Purnarjani (Doordarshan)
- Sathyam (Amrita TV)
- Sthree (Asianet)
- Prayanam (Doordarshan)
