= Chettayees =

- Promotional poster
- Directed by: Shajoon Kariyal
- Written by: Sachy
- Produced by: Biju Menon; Suresh Krishna; Sachy; P. Sukumar; Shajoon Kariyal
- Starring: Lal; Biju Menon; Miya; Suresh Krishna; P. Sukumar; Sunil Babu
- Cinematography: Vinod Illampally
- Edited by: Bijith Bala
- Music by: Deepak Dev
- Production company: Thakkaali Films
- Distributed by: Kalasangham Films
- Release date: 30 November 2012 (Kerala)
- Country: India
- Language: Malayalam

Chettayees: Lovable Rascals is a 2012 Malayalam comedy film written by Sachy and directed by Shajoon Kariyal. The film was produced by Biju Menon, Suresh Krishna, P. Sukumar, Sachy, and Shajoon Kariyal. The film features Lal and Biju Menon in the lead roles, along with Miya, Suresh Krishna, P. Sukumar, Sunil Babu in pivotal roles.

The film tells the story of friendship. The story is centered on an eventful New Year celebration of five friends and the sequence of events following it in the next few days.

== Plot ==
The whole story happens over two days, when five friends get together to celebrate New Year's Eve. The friends are John a lawyer, Kichu a percussionist, Roopesh Krishna an actor, Bava a chef and Babumon a government employee. They are having a blast at John's apartment on the last day of the year. John, who is not on good terms with the apartment association, becomes drunk, goes to the new year party and ruins the party. The apartment owners Mathew Villangadan and Satheesh who were looking for a way of taking vengeance, find that a girl was staying at their apartment overnight. The girl turns out to be Kichu's wife Merlin, who was there to spoil her husband's New Year party. When one of the owners provokes them, Kichu slaps him and leaves.

Roopesh, Bava and Babumon think that John brought her to the apartment and it turns to be a fight and Bava slaps John. Merlin stops the fight and reveals that she was unhappy about the friendship of John and Kichu and was upset that Kichu spends more time with John than her. She overhears Kichu's conversations with John telling that he is joining Kichu during Kichu's recordings which was happening abroad. She gets angry and spoils all their plan. When Kichu realises this, he decides to go for divorce. Merlin gets angry and tells that she hates John as Kichu is spending his time with John, and they starts fighting. That's why, she went to John's apartment to ruin their New Year Party. John gets angry and reveals to Merlin that on the day before the New Year's Eve when Kichu suffered from chest pain, he made John to record a will which states that after Kichu's death, Merlin won't have any rights in his properties. After the recording, John tells that Kichu doesn't love her at all. Merlin becomes heartbroken after hearing this. She blames John for this and decides to commit suicide. John tells and allows her to die, as only he will be caught but Kichu will be safe. John sends Bava to find Kichu. On the way, he gets blocked by the apartment owners whom Kichu slapped. When he tells bad about Merlin, Bava hits him and tells that she is Kichu's wife and she came to spoil their New Year party. Another owner Ansari hears it and tells it to Villangadan. They decides to call the police and charge them against immoral trafficking. They closes the gate, cuts the power of the lift and John's apartment. Merlin decides to go back, but John refuses. He consoles her stating that Kichu might have told about his will when he recollects Merlin's behaviour in his drunken state. He also tells that he will cut his friendship with Kichu if it is a problem for Merlin. She tells that Kichu will come back. When the friends learns about Villangadan's play, they gets shocked. Bava calls Roopesh and tells that he found Kichu in the club. John tells Roopesh to reveal the situation to Bava and if Kichu comes before the police let him tell that Merlin came with him to celebrate New Year. Kichu refuses to come as he thinks that Merlin is acting her love to him. When Bava tells John this, John tells him to not bring Kichu because the police will take them before he comes. Bava gets angry and tells Kichu that John, Roopesh and Babumon is going to be insulted for the issues between Kichu and Merlin and they might lose their family. Kichu changes his mind and goes with Bava. When the police comes, John tries to tell that Merlin is Kichu's wife and he went outside but Villangadan tells it as lie which turns into an argument between John and the apartment association. When the police goes to arrest them, Kichu arrives there with Bava after hitting a security guard. John then tells the police that Villangadan's wife was drunk and they had a fought with them. Then police scolds Villangadan and apartment owners and leaves. After the police leaves, John and Kichu ends up in a fight and they both part their ways.

But later it turns out that John acted that way to rebuild Kichu's married life and that plan works. They keep their friendship going without Merlin knowing about it but in the final scene it shows she knew about it all the time and she has no issues with it anymore.

== Cast ==
- Lal as Advocate John Pallan (John)
- Biju Menon as Krishnakumar (Kichu)
- Suresh Krishna as Roopesh Krishna
- P. Sukumar as Bava
- Sunil Babu as Babumon
- Miya as Merlin, Kichu's wife
- P. Sreekumar as Mathew Villangadan, Flat President
- Sadiq as Satheesh, Flat Secretary
- Anil Murali as Inspector Keshavan
- Ponnamma Babu
- Geetha Vijayan
- Praseetha Menon as Judicial Magistrate Indumathi, Babumon's wife
- Sajitha Betti as Gracy, John's ex-wife
- Deepika Mohan
- Manju Satheesh as Roopesh's wife

== Production ==
It was in the sets of 2007 film Chocolate that script writer Sachy approached Shajoon Kariyal with an interesting thread. Shajoon who was busy in the talks of Raman Police with Gireesh Puthenchery rejected the offer. (Raman Police never took off and Sachy's story was later directed by Joshiy as Run Babby Run in 2012). Shajoon, in the meantime, was also in the pre-production works of Talkies, a film planned by him with Mohanlal in the lead. This project also did not go into floor and this is when Sachy came up with the story of Chettayees.

Biju Menon, Shajoon, Sachy, Suresh Krishna, P. Sukumar and Sunil Babu used to get together in a flat in Kochi very often. It was during one of those evenings that Sachy came up with a thread that talked about friendship. Sachy says: "Some of my friends were spending more time with me and after a while, their wives started saying that actually their husbands should have married me. That prompted me to come up with the storyline. Some of the characters’ traits have been adapted and inspired from the habits of some of our own friends." Everyone liked the story and Shajoon, who was in search for a good script, immediately decided to direct the film. The friends decided to find a producer but in vain. Eventually they decided to launch a new production house named Thakaali Films and to produce the film under this banner.

Principal photography for the film commenced on 18 August 2012 and was completed in October. The film was mainly shot inside Navodaya Studio at Kakkanad, where the interiors of the apartment was set up.

== Reception ==
Critical reactions to the film were mixed to negative. Rating the film 1.5 stars out of 5, Paresh C Palicha of Rediff.com commented that the film "is too loud, with a lot of overacting." Sify.com's critic concluded his review stating, "Chettayees hits the extremes, good and bad that is, and mostly fails to keep a healthy balance. It's almost like a lazy effort that can leave you wanting for more." Veeyen of Nowrunning.com rated the film 1.8 stars out of 5 and said: "Chettayees could have made interesting material, had the makers added up to the very limited resources available at their disposal. But it makes no efforts to tide over these restraints and remains adamant that the ultimate effects produced are nothing above mediocre. This film sadly has a theme that could be discussed in ten minutes sharp; and that it has been stretched to a couple of hours is what makes the movie tiresome." IBN Live rated the film 6 in a scale of 10 and concluded their review saying, "Chettayees is an average fare, that could have hit big, if handled with a little more sensitivity and aplomb."
