= Shajoon Kariyal =

Indian film director and producer

- Born: 6 July 1963 (age 63); Kozhikode, Kerala, India
- Occupations: Film director, producer
- Years active: 1984 – present

Shajoon Kariyal is an Indian film director and producer working in Malayalam cinema.

== Life ==
Shajoon started his film career in 1984, at the age of 21, as an assistant director to I. V. Sasi. He worked as the assistant or associate director to many films including Uyarangalil (1984), Anubandham (1985), Karimpinpoovinakkare (1985), Aavanazhi (1986), 1921 (1988), Douthyam (1989), Varthamana Kalam (1990), Arhatha (1990), Midhya (1991), Neelagiri (1991) and Varnapakittu (1997).

He debuted as a director with Rajaputhran (1996), starring Suresh Gopi, Shobhana and Vikram. He has directed many films, including Thachiledathu Chundan (1999) and Vadakkumnadhan (2006). After Vadakkumnadhan, he planned two films, Raman Police and Talkies, but both the projects did not work out. In 2012, he directed Chettayees which he also co-produced, as one of the five partners of the newly launched production house Thakkaali Films. In 2015 he directed the film Sir C. P.. His latest movie is Mrudhu Bhave Dhruda Kruthye. National award-winning singer Nanjiyamma released the first look poster of the movie. The movie Mrudhu Bhave Dhruda Kruthye released in theaters on 02 February 2024.

== Filmography ==
- Mrudhu Bhave Dhruda Kruthye (2024)
- Sir C. P. (2015)
- Chettayees (2012)
- Vadakkumnadhan (2006)
- Greetings (2004)
- Saivar Thirumeni (2001)
- Dreams (2000)
- Thachiledathu Chundan (1999)
- Rajaputhran (1996)
- Jackpot (1993) (Only Story)
