= P. Sukumar =

Indian filmmaker

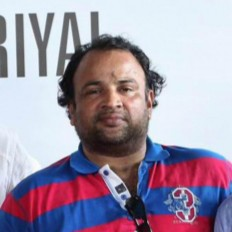
- Born: Kollengode, Kerala, India
- Occupations: Cinematographer, actor, director, producer, entrepreneur
- Writing career
- Notable works: Azhakiya Ravanan; Ee Puzhayum Kadannu; Aaram Thamburan; Ravanaprabhu; Kalyanaraman; Kunjikkoonan; Swapnakoodu; Raappakal; Swantham Lekhakan
- Notable awards: 2009 Kerala State Film Award for Best Debut Director; 1993 Kerala State Film Award for Best Cinematography

P. Sukumar ISC is an Indian cinematographer, director, producer, actor and Law Firm Partner with Advocates Rajkumar K R ( former Bar council of Kerala Hon. Secretary) and Senior Central Government Counsel, and Jagadeesh Lakshman ( Senior Central Government Counsel) who works predominantly in Malayalam cinema. He is known for directing the film, Swantham Lekhakan, and handling the camera for over 65 films such as Twenty:20, Azhakiya Ravanan, Ee Puzhayum Kadannu, Ravanaprabhu, Kalyanaraman, Kunjikkoonan, Swapnakoodu and Raappakal. He has also acted, with the screen name, Kiran, in a number of films including Chettayees and Kaikudanna Nilavu. Noted Malayalam film director, P. Chandrakumar is his elder brother. He is a recipient of the Kerala State Film Award for Best Cinematography in 1993 for the film, Sopanam and the Kerala State Film Award for Best Debut Director for his film Swantham Lekhakan in 2009.

== Selected filmography ==
Film	Year	Role
Layanam	1989	Actor
Sopanam	1993	Cinematographer
Chief Minister K. R. Gowthami	1994	Cinematographer
Thumboli Kadappuram	1995	Cinematographer
Azhakiya Ravanan	1996	Cinematographer
Ee Puzhayum Kadannu	1996	Cinematographer
Aaraam Thampuran	1997	Cinematographer
Ravanaprabhu	2001	Cinematographer
Kalyanaraman	2002	Cinematographer
Kunjikoonan	2002	Cinematographer
Swapnakoodu	2003	Cinematographer
Runway	2004	Cinematographer
Manjupoloru Penkutti	2004	Cinematographer
Rappakal	2005	Cinematographer
Twenty:20	2008	Cinematographer
Swantham Lekhakan	2009	Director, cinematographer, producer
Mr. Marumakan	2012	Cinematographer
Chettayees	2012	Actor
Mayamohini	2012	Producer
Oru Vadakkan Selfie	2015	Actor
Laika	2021	Cinematographer
Lalitham Sundaram	2021	Cinematographer
The Case Diary	2025	Cinematographer

== See also ==
- Jayanan Vincent
- Madhu Ambat
