= Sreenivasan filmography =

Performances by Indian actor

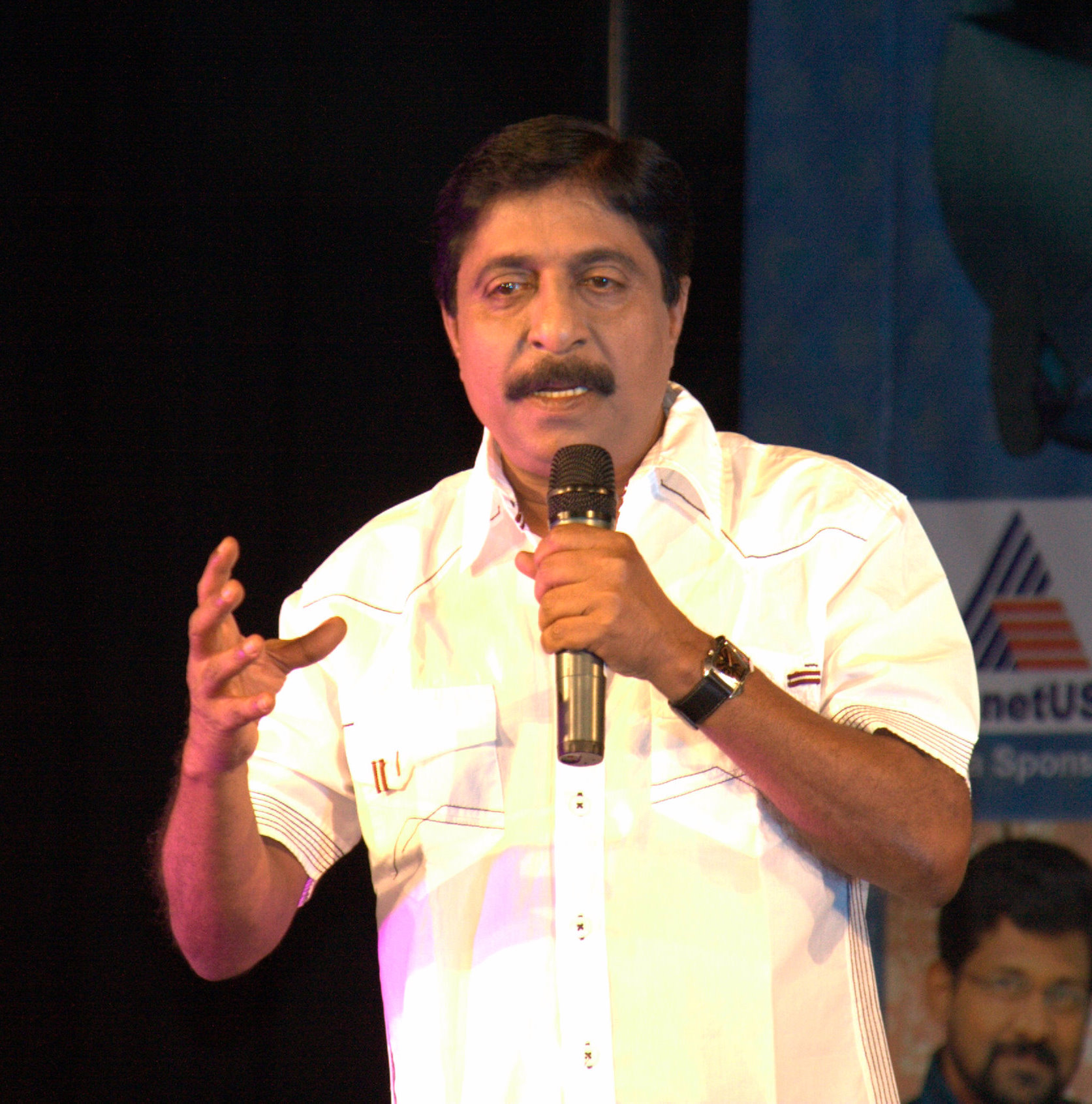
Sreenivasan

This article presents the filmography of Sreenivasan, a Malayali Indian actor, screenwriter, film director, dubbing artist and film producer.

== As an actor ==
=== 1970s ===
Year	Film	Role	Notes
1976	Manimuzhakkam	Vayaran Michael	Debut Film
1977	Sneha Yamuna	Kannan	
1978	Jayikkanayi Janichavan	Singer	Special appearance in a song
1978	Mannu	Mathai	
1978	Ona Pudava		
1979	Sanghagaanam		
1979	Ottappettavar		

=== 1980s ===
Year	Film	Role	Notes
1980	Mela	Balan	
1980	Vilkkanundu Swapnangal	Abu	
1980	Raagam Thaanam Pallavi	Appukuttan	
1981	Kolangal	Kesavan	
1981	Ilaneer	Dasan	
1981	Ahimsa	Raju	
1982	Yavanika	Chellapan	
1982	Kattile Pattu	Balu	
1982	Ee Nadu	P P Sreenivasan	
1982	Chiriyo Chiri	Film Director	
1983	Asthi	Gopi	
1983	Coolie	Gopalan	
1983	Lekhayude Maranam Oru Flashback	Movie Director	
1983	Manassoru Mahaasamudram	Pappu	
1983	Oru Swakaryam	Murali	
1983	Prem Nazirine Kaanmanilla	Kidnapper	
1983	Iniyenkilum	Local Political Leader	
1984	Poochakkoru Mookkuthi	Komali	
1984	Odaruthammava Aalariyam	Bhakthavalsan	
1984	Panchavadi Paalam	Kathavarayan	
1984	Akkare		
1985	Mutharamkunnu P.O.	Dev Anand	
1985	Punnaram Cholli Cholli	Rameshan	
1985	Aram + Aram Kinnaram	Thankappaan/Gopi Krishnan	
1985	Akkare Ninnoru Maran	Ali Koya	
1985	Onnanam Kunnil Oradi Kunnil	Muthu	
1985	Chidambaram	Muniyandi	
1986	T. P. Balagopalan M. A.	Adv.Ramakrishnan	
1986	Gandhinagar 2nd Street	Madhavan	
1986	Mazha Peyyunnu Maddalam Kottunnu	Madhavan	
1986	Sanmanassullavarkku Samadhanam	S.I.Rajendran	
1986	Ponnum Kudathinu Pottu		
1986	Hello My Dear Wrong Number	Priest	
1986	Ayalvasi Oru Daridravasi	Thief	
1986	Oru Katha Oru Nunnakatha		
1986	Ninnistham Ennishtam	Jithinlal-Madanlal	
1986	Nandi Veendum Varika	Damodaran	
1986	Neelakurinhi Poothappol	Purushu	
1986	Dheem Tharikida Thom	Bhaskaran	
1986	Kochuthemmadi	Drill Mashu/Rammohan	
1986	Oridathu	Kuttan	
1986	Aavanazhi	Srini	
1987	Nadodikattu	Vijayan	
1987	Sreedharante Onnam Thirumurivu	Binoy	
1987	Sruthi	Varghese	
1988	Pattanapravesham	Vijayan	
1988	Vellanakalude Nadu	Shivan	
1988	Oru Muthassi Katha		
1988	Mukunthetta Sumitra Vilikkunnu	Viswanath	
1988	Doore Doore Oru Koodu Koottam	Vijayan Master	
1988	Chithram	Bhaskaran Nambiar	
1988	Aryan	M.L.A	
1988	Ponmuttayidunna Tharavu	Bhaskaran	
1988	Kudumbapuranam	Preman Vadakkummuri	
1989	Varavelpu	Break Inspector	
1989	Vadakkunokkiyanthram	Thalathil Dineshan	
1989	Artham	Adv.P.S.Nenmara	

=== 1990s ===
Year	Film	Role	
1990	Vidyarambham	P.K.Sudhakaran	
1990	Akkare Akkare Akkare	Vijayan	
1990	Kalikkalam	Jamal	
1990	Pavam Pavam Rajakumaran	Gopalakrishnan	
1990	His Highness Abdullah	Ravi Varma	
1990	Aanaval Mothiram	James Pallithara	
1990	Thalayanamanthram	Sukumaran	
1990	Nagarangalil Chennu Raparkam	Kunjoottan	
1990	Aye Auto	Police Inspector	
1990	Minda Poochakku Kalyanam	Kamalasanan	
1991	Sandesham	Prabhakaran	
1991	Thudarkadha	Shivan	
1991	Kankettu	Professor Rangoonwalah the Magician	
1991	Nettipattam	Peethambharam	
1991	Ennum Nanmakal	Dr. Anirudhan	
1991	Aakasha Kottayile Sultan	Keshavan Kutty	
1992	Sadayam	Kunjali	
1992	Swaroopam	Shekharan	
1992	Oru Kochu Bhoomikulukkam	Sidharthan	
1992	My Dear Muthachan	Dinakaran/Babu Raj	
1992	Maanyanmar	Pathira Thankappan	
1992	Cheppadividya	Mayanadu Madhavan	
1992	Champakulam Thachan	Bhargavan	
1992	Aayushkalam	Damu	
1993	Midhunam	Preman	
1993	Samooham	Ramachandran/Pavithran	
1993	Bhaagyavaan	Balagopalan	
1993	Magrib	Mohammed Unni	
1993	Aalavattom	Balu	
1993	Aacharyan	Shivasankaran	
1993	Aayirappara	Vasu	
1993	Golanthara Vartha	Karakkoottil Dasan	
1994	Varaphalam	Unni	
1994	Thenmavin Kombath	Appakkala	
1994	Vadhu Doctoranu	Vinayan	
1994	Pavithram	Ramakrishnan	
1994	Manathe Vellitheru	Appukuttan	
1994	Kinnaripuzhayoram	Kunjikrishnan	
1994	Saraamsham		
1995	Sipayi Lahala	Appukuttan Menon	
1995	Mazhayethum Munpe	Rahman	
1995	Pullakuttikaran	Koorapazha Janardhan	Tamil film
1995	Ormakalundayirikkanam	Thacholi Varghese Chekavar	
1996	Mr.Clean	Mahadevan Thampy	
1996	Madamma	Nanu	
1996	Kinnam Katta Kallan	K.V. Bhaskaran	
1996	Kalapani	Moosa	
1996	Azhakiya Raavanan	Ambujakshan	
1997	Oral Mathram	Sachidanandan	
1997	Karunyam	Gopalakrishnan	
1997	Chandralekha	Nooruddeen	
1997	Guru	Shravanakan	
1997	Irattakuttikalude Achan	Sahadevan	
1998	Vismayam	Sahadevan	
1998	Oru Maravathoor Kanavu	Maruthu	
1998	Mangalya Pallakuu	Mukundan	
1998	Ayal Kadha Ezhuthukayanu	Ramakrishnan/Dileep Menon	
1998	Chinthavishtayaya Shyamala	Vijayan	
1999	Prasala Pachan Payyannoor Paramu	Payyannoor Paramu	
1999	Megham	Shanmugam	
1999	Friends	Chackachaparambil Joy	
1999	English Medium	Shankaranarayanan	
1999	Angene Oru Avadhikkalathu	Balakrishnan	

=== 2000s ===
Year	Film	Role	
2000	Pilots	Robinson Cruso	
2000	Madhuranombarakattu	Sekharan	
2001	Narendran Makan Jayakanthan Vaka	Bhargavan	
2001	Ishtam	Vipin K.Menon	
2002	Krishna Gopalakrishna	Dr.Subrahmani	
2002	Yathrakarude Sradhakku	Gopi	
2003	Kilichundan Mampazham	Moidukutty Hajji	
2003	Lesa Lesa	Pandi	Tamil film
2004	Wanted	Khader	
2005	Udayananu Tharam	Rajappan/Saroj Kumar	
2005	Boyy Friennd	Police Officer Kartha	
2005	Made in USA	Dr Mathew	
2006	Balram vs. Taradas	Harichandran	
2006	Prajapathi	Ali Raghavan	
2006	Bhargavacharitham Moonam Khandam	Dr.Shantharam	
2006	Yes Your Honour	Ravishankar	
2007	Anchil Oral Arjunan	Kovilakam Sreedharan	
2007	Arabikkatha	Quba Mukundan	
2007	Thakarachenda	Chakrapani	
2007	Ayur Rekha	Jacob George	
2007	Kadha Parayumbol	Balan	
2008	Pachamarathannalil	Sachidanandan	
2008	Akasha Gopuram	Dr.Isaac	
2008	Annan Thambi	Narrator	Voice role
2008	Twenty:20	Kunchappan	
2008	Samayam	Chathappan	
2009	Makante Achan	Viswanathan	
2009	Kadha, Samvidhanam Kunchakko	Kunchako/Kuncheria	
2009	Passenger	Sathyanathan	
2009	Kerala Cafe		
2009	Paleri Manikyam: Oru Pathirakolapathakathinte Katha	Keshavan	
2009	Evidam Swargamanu	Adv.Prabhalan/Koshy	

=== 2010s ===
Year	Film	Role	Other notes
2010	Oru Naal Varum	Gopi Krishnan	
2010	Aatmakatha	Kochubaby	
2010	Malarvaadi Arts Club	Blade Bhaasi	
2010	Best Actor	Sreekumar	
2011	Traffic	Constable Sudhevan	
2011	Oru Marubhoomikkadha	Narrator	
2011	Gadhama	Razzaq Kottekkad	
2011	Bombay Mittayi	Prathapan	
2012	Padmasree Bharat Dr. Saroj Kumar	Saroj Kumar	Spin-off to Udayananu Tharam
2012	Diamond Necklace	Venu	
2012	Bhoopadathil Illatha Oridam	Madhavankutty	
2012	Shutter	Manoharan	
2012	Thattathin Marayathu	Abdul Rahman	
2012	Theevram	C.I. Alexander	
2012	Jawan of Vellimala	Varghese	
2012	Chapters	Sethu	
2012	Unnam	Balakrishna	
2012	Outsider	Sivankutty	
2012	Parudeesa	Bishop Aanjalithanam	
2013	Celluloid	Chelangad Gopalakrishnan	
2013	Money Back Policy	Ashokan	
2013	Weeping Boy	Sahadevan	
2014	Bhoomiyude Avakashikal	Beeran Ikka	
2014	@Andheri	Sub Inspector Menon	
2014	God's Own Country	Adv.Mathen Tharakan	
2014	Actually	Sanu	
2014	Nagara Varidhi Naduvil Njan	Venu	
2015	Saradhi	ASI	
2015	You Too Brutus	Hari Narayanan	
2015	Chirakodinja Kinavukal	N.P. Ambujakshan	
2015	Love 24x7	Umar Abdullah	
2015	Swargathekkal Sundaram	Sathish	
2015	Pathemari	Moideen	
2015	My God	Fr.Vadakkan	
2016	Guppy	Upooppa	
2017	Honey Bee 2: Celebrations	Thampi Anthony	
2017	Sakhavu	Doctor	
2017	Ayaal Sassi	Sassi Namboothiri	
2017	Sherlock Toms	Narrator	
2017	Sunday Holiday	Unni Mukundan	
2017	Honey Bee 2.5	Himself	Cameo
2018	Daivame Kaithozham K. Kumar Akanam	Doctor	
2018	Kallai FM	Ceylon Bappu	
2018	Kalyanam	Prabhakaran	
2018	Aravindante Athidhikal	Madhavan	200th film
2018	Paviettante Madhurachooral	Paviettan	Also Writer
2018	Njan Prakashan	Gopal Ji	Also Writer
2019	Mera Naam Shaji	Adv.Lawrance	
2019	Kuttymama	Shekarankutty	
2019	Naan Petta Makan		
2019	And The Oscar Goes To	Aravindan	
2019	Love Action Drama	Ganesh Menon	

=== 2020s ===
Year	Film	Role	Notes
2020	Uriyadi	ASI Padmanabhan Pillai aka Pappettan	
2021	Mohan Kumar Fans	Br. Paulutty	
2022	Makal	Himself	
2022	Keedam	Balan	
2022	Pyali	Zayed	
2023	Kurukkan	Krishnan	
2025	Aap Kaise Ho		
2025	Nancy Rani	Mess Mohan	Final Film

== As a writer ==
Year	Film	Director	Other Notes
1984	Odaruthammava Aalariyam	Priyadarshan	
1985	Akkare Ninnoru Maran	Girish	
1985	Aram + Aram Kinnaram	Priyadarshan	
1985	Boeing Boeing	Priyadarshan	Dialogue only
1985	Mutharamkunnu P.O.	Sibi Malayil	
1985	Punnaram Cholli Cholli	Priyadarshan	
1986	Nandi Veendum Varika	P.G. Viswambharan	Screenplay only
1986	Gandhinagar 2nd Street	Sathyan Anthikkad	
1986	Mazha Peyyunnu Maddalam Kottunnu	Priyadarshan	
1986	Oru Katha Oru Nunnakkatha	Mohan	co-written with Mohan
1986	Hello My Dear Wrong Number	Priyadarshan	
1986	Ponnum Kudathinu Pottu	T.S. Suresh Babu	
1986	Doore Doore Oru Koodu Koottam	Sibi Malayil	
1986	Sanmanassullavarkku Samadhanam	Sathyan Anthikkad	
1986	T. P. Balagopalan M.A.	Sathyan Anthikkad	
1987	Sreedharante Onnam Thirumurivu	Sathyan Anthikkad	
1987	Nadodikkattu	Sathyan Anthikkad	Screenplay
1988	Mukunthetta Sumitra Vilikkunnu	Priyadarshan	
1988	Oru Muthassi Katha	Priyadarshan	
1988	Pattanapravesham	Sathyan Anthikkad	
1988	Vellanakalude Nadu	Priyadarshan	
1989	Vadakkunokkiyantram	Himself	
1989	Varavelpu	Sathyan Anthikkad	
1990	Akkare Akkare Akkare	Priyadarshan	
1990	Paavam Paavam Rajakumaran	Kamal	
1990	Thalayanamanthram	Sathyan Anthikkad	
1990	Vidhyarambham	Jayaraj	
1991	Kankettu	Rajan Balakrishnan	
1991	Sandesham	Sathyan Anthikkad	
1992	Champakulam Thachan	Kamal	
1992	My Dear Muthachan	Sathyan Anthikkad	
1993	Golanthara Vartha	Sathyan Anthikkad	
1993	Midhunam	Priyadarshan	
1995	Sipayi Lahala	Vinayan	
1995	Mazhayethum Munpe	Kamal	
1996	Azhakiya Ravanan	Kamal	
1997	Irattakuttikalude Achan	Sathyan Anthikkad	
1998	Ayal Kadha Ezhuthukayanu	Kamal	Screenplay
1998	Chinthavishtayaya Shyamala	Himself	
1998	Oru Maravathoor Kanavu	Lal Jose	
1999	English Medium	Pradeep Chokli	
1999	Parassala Pachan Payyannur Paramu	Venu	
2000	Swayamvarapandhal	Harikumar	
2001	Narendran Makan Jayakanthan Vaka	Sathyan Anthikkad	
2002	Yathrakarude Sradhakku	Sathyan Anthikkad	
2003	Kilichundan Mampazham	Priyadarshan	
2005	Udayananu Tharam	Roshan Andrews	
2006	Bhargavacharitham Moonam Khandam	Joemon	
2007	Kadha Parayumbol	M. Mohanan	
2010	Oru Naal Varum	T. K. Rajeev Kumar	
2012	Padmasree Bharat Dr. Saroj Kumar	Sajin Raaghavan	
2014	Nagara Varidhi Naduvil Njan	Shibu Balan	Screen Play & Dialogues
2018	Njan Prakashan	Sathyan Anthikkad	
2018	Paviyettante Madhoorachooral	Sreekrishnan	

== As a director ==
Year	Film
1989	Vadakkunokkiyanthram
1998	Chinthavishtayaya Shyamala

== As a producer ==
Film	Director	Notes
Kadha Parayumbol	M. Mohanan	
Thattathin Marayathu	Vineeth Sreenivasan	Co-produced with Mukesh under the banner Lumiere Film Company

== As a dubbing artist ==
Year	Film	Character	Dubbed for
1980	Mela	Vijayan	Mammootty
1980	Vilkkanundu Swapnangal	Madhavankutty	Mammootty
1982	Ilakkangal	Unnikrishnan	Nedumudi Venu
1982	Vidhichathum Kothichathum	Sreenivasan	Mammootty
1983	Oru Madapravinte Katha	Balachandran	Mammootty
1983	Pallamkuzhi	Hemachandran	V. Sambasivan
1986	Ayalvasi Oru Daridravasi	Advocate	Ambalapuzha Raju
1988	Oru Muthassi Katha	Chemparundu Machan	Thiagarajan

== Television ==
Year	Title	Channel	Notes
2000-2004	Cheriya Sreeniyum Valiya lokavum	Kairali	Chat show
