= G.P. Vijayakumar =

Indian film producer

G.P. Vijayakumar commonly known as "Seven arts" Vijayakumar is an Indian film producer, who has produced 43 films so far and distributed 70 Films in various languages since 1985 under the banner of Seven Arts International Ltd. His last film to hit theatres was the Malayalam movie Geethanjali directed by Priyadarshan. He produced many movies with Superstars Mohanlal, Mamooty, Suresh Gopi, Dileep, Prithviraj, Jayaram, and so on under the banner of Seven arts international Ltd, now a famous production house in the Malayalam film industry well known for super hit commercial movies. Many of his films won regional and national awards in various disciplines. He produced the film “Kuselan" with the superstar Rajinikanth. He also co-produced Hindi Film ChalChalaChal and line Produced BhoolBhulaiyaa, Dhol, Mere BaapPahleAap, Bum Bum Bole, Khattameetha, and KamaalDhamaalMalamal. Many of his films were in Indian Panorama, represented India in many international festivals. In fact, he paved a major path for taking Malayalam films to the international markets.

== Early life and family ==
He was born in Kerala, and did his schooling at the RVSM High School, Prayar, Oachira, and received graduation from the NSS College, Chenganassery. During college, he was elected as the College Union Chairman and University union member.

== Career ==
Apart from being a successful producer, he also served as the president of the Kerala film chamber, was the vice-president of the Film Federation of India. Presently he is the vice-president of the South Indian Film Chamber of Commerce. He has also served as a juror in National Film Awards selection 2021 and in many other major film festivals.

== Filmography ==
Year	Title	Director	Cast
1985	Kathodu Kathoram	Bharathan	MAMMOOTTY, SARITHA
1986	Panchagni	Hariharan	MOHANLAL, GEETHA
1986	Chilambu	Bharathan	RAHMAN, SOBHANA
1986	Thalavattam	Priyadarshan	MOHANLAL, KARTHIKA
1987	Theertham	Mohan	NEDUMUDI VENU, PALLAVI JOSHI
1987	Idanazhiyil Oru Kaalocha	Bhadran	VINEETH, KARTHIKA, JAYABHARATHI
1987	Oridathu	G. Aravindan	NEDUMUDI VENU, SREENIVASAN
1987	Swathi Thirunal	Lenin Rajendran	ANAND NAG, RANJINI
1987	Sruthi	Mohan	NEDUMUDI VENU, GEETHA
1988	Mukunthetta Sumitra Vilikkunnu	Priyadarshan	MOHANLAL, RANJINI
1988	Moonnam Mura	K. Madhu	MOHANLAL, REVATHI
1989	Naduvazhikal	Joshiy	MOHANLAL, MURALI, ROOPINI
1989	Kireedam	Sibi Malayil	MOHANLAL, PARVATHI
1990	His Highness Abdullah	Sibi Malayil	MOHANLAL, GOUTHAMI
1990	Akkare Akkare Akkare	Priyadarshan	MOHANLAL, PARVATHI
1990	Appu	Dennis Joseph	MOHANLAL, SUNITHA
1990	Vidhyarambham	Jayaraj	SREENIVASAN, GOUTHAMI
1991	Bharatham	Sibi Malayil	MOHANLAL, URVASI
1992	Sadayam	Sibi Malayil	MOHANLAL, MAATHU
1992	Kamaladalam	Sibi Malayil	MOHANLAL, MONISHA
1992	Rajashilpi	R. Sukumaran	MOHANLAL, BHANUPRIYA
1992	Ellarum Chollanu	Kaladharan	MUKESH, SUMA RANGANATHU
1993	Chamayam	Bharathan	MURALI, SITHARA, RANJITHA
1994	The City	I. V. Sasi	SURESH GOPI, URVASHI
1994	Parinayam	Hariharan	VINEETH, MOHINI
1995	Thacholi Varghese Chekavar	T. K. Rajeev Kumar	MOHANLAL, URMILA MANTODKAR
1996	Yuvathurki	Bhadran	SURESH GOPI, VIJAYASANTHI
1996	Udyanapalakan	Harikumar	MAMMOOTTY, KAVERI
1997	Lelam	Joshiy	SURESH GOPI, NANDINI
1999	Pathram	Joshiy	SURESH GOPI, MANJU WARRIAR
1999	Vazhunnor	Joshiy	SURESH GOPI, SAMYUKTHA
2006	Chakkaramuthu	A. K. Lohithadas	DILEEP, KAVYA MADHAVAN
2006	Smart City	B. Unnikrishnan	SURESH GOPI, LAKSHMI G SWAMI
2008	Kuselan	P. Vasu	RAJANIKANTH, PASUPATHI, MEENA
2008	Kathanayakudu	P. Vasu	RAJANIKANTH, JAGAPAHI BABU, MEENA
2009	Chal Chala Chal	T. K. Rajeev Kumar	GOVINDA, RAJPAL YADAV, REEMA SEN
2009	Makante Achan	V. M. Vinu	SREENIVASAN, SUHASINI
2012	Njanum Ente Familiyum	K. K. Rajeev	JAYARAM, MAMTA MOHANDAS
2012	Hero	Diphan	PRITHVIRAJ, YAMI GOWTHM
2013	Nakhangal	Suresh Krishnan	RAGENDU, MADAN MOHAN
2013	Geethaanjali	Priyadarshan	MOHANLAL, KEERTHI SURESH
