= Praseetha Menon =

Indian actress and comedian

- Born: Kochi, India
- Occupations: Actress; Comedian; Host
- Years active: 1988–present

Praseetha Menon (born 1976) is an Indian actress and comedian who appears in Malayalam films, television and stage. She made her acting debut through Moonnam Mura in 1988 as a child artist.

== Career ==
She started her career as a mimicry artist at a young age and later became an actress. Praseetha has appeared in more than 35 Malayalam films in several character and comedy roles. She came into limelight after started playing the role of Ammayi in Badai Bungalow, a sketch comedy and celebrity talk show.

== Filmography ==
Year	Title	Role
1988	Moonnam Mura	
1989	Varavelpu	Sunitha
1989	Ulsavapittennu	Nandini
1989	Pradeshika Varthakal	
1990	Pavam Pavam Rajakumaran	Gopalakrishnan's sister
1990	Shubhayathra	Vishnu's sister
1990	Kattukuthira	Sainu
1990	Maalayogam	Mercey
1990	Saandram	Sofiya Poulose
1991	Souhrudam	Sreelakshmi
1991	Kasarkode Khaderbai	Praseetha
1991	Aakasha Kottayile Sultan	Kasthuri
1992	Kudumbasametham	
1995	Thacholi Varghese Chekavar	Varghese's sister
1995	Mazhayethum Munpe	Kunjumol
1995	Puthukkottayile Puthumanavalan	Sumathi
1997	Ishtadanam	Gouri
1998	Punjabi House	Cook
1999	Pathram	Monica David Sabhapathy
2000	Darling Darling	Shalini
2001	Ee Parakkum Thalika	TV Host
2002	Kaalachakram	Renuka George
2004	Vellinakshatram	Sakunthaladevi Thampuratti
2007	Hallo	Chidambaram's second wife
2010	Kaaryasthan	Herself
2012	Chettayees	Indumathi
2013	Crocodile Love Story	Sreeraj's mother
2013	Idukki Gold	Manju
2013	Rebecca Uthup Kizhakkemala	Kochu Mary
2015	Rockstar	Meenamma
2017	Aby	Sathi
2018	Mohanlal	Ammini
2019	Oru Kadatunadan Katha	Akkama
2019	Stand Up	Constable Sini
2025	The Pet Detective	Lolitha

== TV Serials/Shows ==
- Mohapakshikal
- Priyam
- Sthree
- Manchiyam
- Padmasree Padmavathi
- Badai Bungalow
- Cinemala
- Comedy Show
- Super Challenge
- Star Trek
- Playback
- Comedy Super Show
- Cinima Chirima
- Vanitha
- Annies Kitchen

== Play ==
The Island of Blood
