= Kathanayakudu (2008 film) =

- Movie Poster
- Directed by: P. Vasu
- Written by: Marudhuri Raja (dialogues)
- Screenplay by: P. Vasu
- Story by: Sreenivasan
- Produced by: C. Aswani Dutt; G. P. Vjaykumar
- Starring: Rajinikanth; Jagapati Babu; Meena
- Cinematography: Arvind Krishna
- Edited by: Saravana
- Music by: G. V. Prakash Kumar
- Production company: Vyjayanthi Movies
- Distributed by: Ayngaran (Worldwide); Pyramid Saimira (U.S.)
- Release date: 1 August 2008
- Running time: 146 minutes
- Country: India
- Language: Telugu

Kathanayakudu (transl. The protagonist) is a 2008 Indian Telugu-language drama film produced by Aswani Dutt and G. P. Vijayakumar. It is directed by P. Vasu. The film is a remake of the Malayalam film Kadha Parayumbol (2007) and stars Rajinikanth in an extended guest appearance along with Jagapati Babu and Meena. Sunil and Dharmavarapu play pivotal roles. It was simultaneously made in Tamil as Kuselan.

The film explores the pressures of friendship, and revolves around a villager who had shared a strong friendship with a popular cinema actor while they were in their youth. However, due to their different career routes, they are eventually forced to part ways; one becoming a national figure, the other becoming a village barber. Decades later, the actor returns to the village to participate in his film's shooting. Whilst the entire village becomes excited about the prospect of seeing the actor, the barber fears that his old friend would have forgotten him and eventually neglected him.

== Plot ==
The plot tells the story of two childhood friends: Balakrishna and Ashok Kumar. Balu stops at nothing to make his friend happy. As time passes by, they take different paths, and Balu becomes a barber in a small village called Siricilla. He marries Devi and has three children and leads a happy life. However, his finances are poor and he is often led to the door of Dharmaraju, the financier. He has tough competition from the smarter and more clever Shanmugam, who has a salon opposite his shop. Balu is a man with self-respect and honesty. His life continues the same until one day there is news that a film shooting is going to happen in a place near their village and the hero of the film is superstar Ashok Kumar. The news spreads rapidly, but Balu hesitates to reveal himself to be a friend of Ashok Kumar. However, people around Balu learn about their friendship, and suddenly those who have been ridiculing him start doing favors for him—only to meet Ashok Kumar, or at least watch him from outside. Balu is hesitant to do what they want, and soon people start shunning him. Balu faces poor treatment even from his children. At last, Ashok Kumar publicly acknowledges Balu as his childhood friend who made him a superstar, and he meets Balu.

== Cast ==
- Rajinikanth as Ashok Kumar (extended guest appearance; voice dubbed by S. P. Balasubrahmanyam)
- Jagapathi Babu as Balakrishna "Balu"
- Meena as Sreedevi, Balu's wife
- Sunil as Shanmugam
- Dharmavarapu as Dharmaraju
- Shafna as Balu's elder daughter
- Revathy Sivakumar as Balu's younger daughter
- Ali
- M. S. Narayana as Dharmaraju's assistant
- Duvvasi Mohan as Dharmaraju's assistant
- Narsing Yadav as Dharmaraju's assistant
- Venu Madhav
- Tanikella Bharani as School teacher
- R. Sundarrajan as Srinivas
- Manobala as Sub-Inspector
- Chinni Jayanth as Tribal
- Kondavalasa
- Rallapalli as R. Ramesh
- Vijayaranga Raju
- Venu Yeldandi
- Rajababu
- Chitti Babu
- Gundu Hanumantha Rao
- Gautam Raju
- Ananth
- Mohan Raman as Ashok Kumar's PA
- Thalapathi Dinesh
- Aajam
- Potti Rambabu
- Visweswara Rao
- Geetha as Headmistress
- Rajitha
- Fathima Babu as Sister Maria
- Sona as Sona

Guest appearances

- Nayanthara as herself
- Brahmanandam as Koya Dora
- Prabhu as Sub-Inspector Satya
- Nizhalgal Ravi as himself
- Vijayakumar as himself
- Mamta Mohandas as Assistant director
- Raj Bahadur as himself

The film also featured reused footage from Kuselan (2008).

== Production ==
=== Development ===
Following P. Vasu and Rajinikanth's film Chandramukhi in 2005, Vasu had been keen to cast Rajinikanth in another role. Before signing Kathanayakudu, he had narrated a story titled Vettaiyan, which would have been a sequel of a character featured in Chandramukhi. Kathanayakudu was launched on 15 March 2008 at Hotel Novotel in Hyderabad. P. Vasu signed up Rajinikanth and Jagapathi Babu to portray the lead roles, while Aswani Dutt agreed to produce the film in Telugu. The film is a remake of the Malayalam film Kadha Parayumbol, which was written by Sreenivasan, who also played the lead role in that film.

=== Casting and crew ===
Vasu made it clear that Rajinikanth would not perform an honorary role in the film, which Mammooty had portrayed in the original, but would play a full role, stating that, "the whole story revolves around him [Rajnikanth]". In the Telugu version, comedy actors Sunil, Brahmanandam, Tanikella Bharani and Venu Madhav all signed up to play the roles of Jagapati Babu's fellow villagers. Ileana D'Cruz turned down an offer to act in the film, citing scheduling conflicts. Like the Tamil version, it was said that several prominent Telugu actors had been approached to be a part of a song in the project, but none were selected. Technicians were common in both versions in the two films. with G. V. Prakash Kumar operating as the music composer and Arvind Krishna as the cinematographer.

=== Filming ===
The film's launch was on 7 March 2008 at the AVM Studios in Chennai with the leading artists present. P. Vasu said that the shooting lasted 82 days, with the versions being shot simultaneously and that most of the movie was shot inside the Ramoji Rao film city, with other destinations including Kerala and Pollachi. Some of Rajinikanth's scenes were reused from Kuselan.

== Soundtrack ==
Kathanayakudu

Film score by G. V. Prakash Kumar
- Released: 30 June 2008
- Recorded: 2008
- Genre: Soundtrack
- Length: 29:43
- Language: Telugu
- Label: Big Music
- Producer: G. V. Prakash Kumar

G. V. Prakash Kumar chronology
| Ullasamga Utsahamga (2008) | Kathanayakudu (2008) | Ananda Thandavam (2008) |

The soundtrack of Kathanayakudu was released on 30 June 2008. The soundtrack consists of five songs.

| No. | Song | Singers | Length (m:ss) |
|---|---|---|---|
| 1 | "Cinema Cinema" | Shankar Mahadevan | 6:08 |
| 2 | "Challe Challe" | Hariharan, Sujatha Mohan, Baby Rajini, Baby Pooja | 6:13 |
| 3 | "Om Zaarare" | K. S. Chithra, Daler Mehndi | 7:12 |
| 4 | "Vatche Vatche" | Shreya Ghoshal | 4:34 |
| 5 | "Ra Ra Ra Ramayanna" | Kailash Kher, V Prasanna | 5:36 |

== Reception ==
Rediff.com gave the film a rating of 2 1/2 out of 5 stars and wrote: "P Vasu conceives everything in a larger than life canvas keeping in sync with the image of the superstar he is directing. And while he seems to have gone overboard by moving away from the original, Kathanayakudu is worth a watch for the touching last moments." Jeevi of Idlebrain.com rated the film three out of five and wrote that "The plus points of the film are Rajnikant, Jagapati Babu and a heart touching climax. On a flip side, a better screenplay and a faster narration would have helped the film tremendously". A critic from 123telugu also rated the film three out of five and wrote that "Go to the movie, if you want to see a film with a good script, good performances and a sentimental climax which will definitely bring a tear to your eye. Another very good family outing".
