= Manoj Guinness =

Indian actor

- Born: Manoj; Karimugal, Ambalamedu, Kochi, India
- Occupations: Actor; comedian
- Years active: 1991–present

Manoj Guinness is an Indian actor and comedian who appears in Malayalam films, television and stage shows.

== Personal life ==
Manoj hails from Ernakulam, Kerala. He did his schooling from Govt High School Ambalamugal and Gateway High School and completed his college education from Al-Ameen College, Edathala, Aluva. During his school and college days, Manoj performed Mimicry on stage. He has three siblings. His younger brother Ajith appeared in ‘Elayanila’ and ‘Minnale’ aired in Jeevan TV. Ajith worked as scriptwriter for the film ‘Money Ratnam’ which had Fahad Faasil in lead role. He is married and has one child and currently resides in his hometown Karimugal, Kerala.

== Career ==
Guinness started his career as a mimicry artist in Cochin Century. He later shifted to Cochin Guinness, a popular mimicry troupe. He appeared in numerous stage shows worldwide.

He also performed as the lead in the TV show Badai Bungalow.

== Filmography ==
Year	Film	Role	Director	Note
2002	Mazhathullikkilukkam	Horse rider	Akbar -Jose	
2007	Nasrani	Uncredited role	Joshiy	
2007	Chocolate	Chakkyarkuthukaran	Shafi	
2011	Aazhakadal	Uncredited role	Shaan	
2015	My God	Chacko	M. Mohanan	
2016	Angane Thanne Nethave Anjettennam Pinnale	Rahul	Ajith Poojapura	
2016	Oru Muthassi Gadha		Jude Anthany Joseph	
2016	Kavi Uddheshichathu..?	Ithilkanni	Liju Thomas	
2017	Prethamundu Sookshikkuka		Mohammed Ali, Shafeer Khan	
2017	Cappaccino		Noushad	Post-production
2017	Mask		Thief	
2018	Chakkara Mavin Kombath	Kavi Sasi		
2018	Queen		Dijo Jose Antony	
2018	Ladoo	Lovlesh	Arungeorge K David	
2019	Bhayam	Biju	Ajith C Lokesh	
2019	Charminar	Valsan	Ajith C Lokesh	
2019	Adhyarathri	Kunjatta	Jibu Jacob	
2019	Pathamclassile prenayam	joye	Nithish k Nair	
2021	Muddy	Shajikuttan	Dr. Pragabhal	

== Television ==
Year	Show	Role	Channel	Note
2005-2010	Cinemala	writer and various roles	Asianet	Comedy series
2013- 2020	Badai Bungalow season 1,2	Manoj(various roles)	Asianet	Comedy talk show
2020-2021	Funny Nights with Pearle Maaney	Manoj	Zee Keralam	Comedy Talk show
