= Badai Bungalow =

Television series

- Also known as: Badai Bungalow; Badai Banglavu
- ബഡായി ബംഗ്ലാവ്
- Genre: Talk show Comedy
- Created by: In-House Productions
- Written by: Kalabhavan Madhu, Jayaraj Centuary, Murali Guinnes
- Directed by: Diana Silvester
- Presented by: Mukesh; Kalabhavan Navas; Arya; Praseetha
- Starring: Season 1: Ramesh Pisharody; Mukesh; Dharmajan; Arya; Manoj Guinness; Praseetha; Season 2: Mukesh; Kalabhavan Navas; Arya Rohit; Praseetha; Manoj Guinnes
- Country of origin: India
- Original language: Malayalam
- No. of seasons: 2
- No. of episodes: 235

Production
- Producer: Diana Silvester
- Production locations: Kakkanad, Kochi, Kerala
- Camera setup: Multi-camera
- Running time: 90 mins approx.

Original release
- Network: Asianet
- Release: 13 October 2013 – 5 January 2020

Badai Bungalow (transl. Bungalow for Boasting) is an Indian Malayalam sketch comedy and celebrity talk show hosted by Ramesh Pisharody, Mithun Ramesh, and Kalabhavan Navas that launched on Asianet from 2013. It airs every Saturday and Sunday at 8:00 PM. The second season of the show aired on every Friday at 9:30 PM.

Each episode features celebrity guests who usually appear to promote their latest films in a comedy-focussed talk show format. Several stars from Malayalam film and television industry has participated in this show.

Mukesh is a permanent guest in the show playing the role of Badai Bungalow's owner. Due to high viewership, the air time was changed to every Sunday at 8:30 pm. It replaced the long-running comedy series Cinemala. The show ended on 3 June 2018.

The second season of the series premiered on 3 March 2019 on Asianet channel.

== Controversy ==
Ramesh Pisharody's absence from the program for around a month led to a decrease in the show's popularity. The alternative host, Rajesh, falls short as a replacement for Pisharody, especially in bringing liveliness and engaging guests with humour rather than showering praise and epitomising them as beyond human which fails to ground with the Malayali audience. His absence or speculated termination was met with highly negative feedback through social media. Though the main host of the show, Mukesh, said this was a temporary setback.

Rajesh, who was already popular as an anchor, later added a video featuring him with Mukesh, Pisharody, and Arya, clarifying this point. Later, Pisharody returned to the show, and the popularity increased again.

== Cast ==
Season 1	Season 2
Main cast
Mukesh as Badai Bungalow's owner
Ramesh Pisharody as Tenant at Badai Bungalow	Kalabhavan Navas as Tenant at Badai Bungalow
Manoj Guinness as Neighbor/Regular visitor
Arya as Tenant's wife	Arya as Arya
Dharmajan Bolgatty as Servant at Badai Bungalow	Apsara as Tenant's wife
Praseetha Menon as Ammayi (Tenant's aunt)
Recurring cast
Veena Nair as Cheryammayi (Tenant's aunt)	Anu Joseph as Clara
Harisree Martin as a Regular visitor	Jaffar Idukki as Regular visitor
Nobi as Servant at Badai Bungalow	Ponnamma Babuas Regular visitor
Devi Chandana as kunjammayi	Anju Aravind as Mukesh's wife
Saritha.B.Nair as a Regular visitor	Sinoj Varghese as DJ Vicky, Ammayi's Husband
Sethu Lakshmi as Regular visitor
Meera Muralidharan as Stella
Apsara as Daisy (tenants at upstairs)
Kishor as Vishnu Namboothiri (tenants at upstairs)
Mamukkoya as Hamzakkoya
Rajesh as Host (in absence of Pisharody)	Mithun Ramesh as Tenant at Badai Bungalow
Lakshmi Priya as Ammayi (in the absence of Praseetha)	Lakshmi Menon as Tenant's wife

== Popular guests (Season 1) ==
Cine Actors

- Dulquer Salmaan
- Hemanth Menon
- Nishan K. P. Nanaiah
- Jacob Gregory
- Shritha Sivadas
- Innocent
- Seema
- Mohanlal
- Ambika
- Kaviyoor Ponnamma
- Urvashi
- Kalpana
- Jayaram
- Ratheesh Vegha
- Akshara Kishor
- Biju Menon
- Miya
- Shwetha Menon
- Surabhi Lakshmi
- Rima Kallingal
- Lal
- Arya (actor)
- Jayasurya
- Vinay Forrt
- Lakshmi Gopalaswamy
- Maniyanpilla Raju
- Mala Aravindan
- Govind Padmasoorya
- Muthumani
- Amala Paul
- Mamta Mohandas
- Navya Nair
- Methil Devika
- Manju Warriar
- Manoj K. Jayan
- Dileep
- Bhavana
- Anusree
- Unni Mukundan
- Tovino Thomas
- Wamiqa Gabbi
- Nivin Pauly
- Abrid Shine
- Aju Varghese
- Dhyan Sreenivasan
- Vineeth Sreenivasan
- Fahadh Faasil
- Soubin Shahir
- Shamna Kasim
- Honey Rose
- Meera Nandan
- Namitha Pramod
- Narain
- Riyaz Khan
- Ashokan
- Sai Kumar
- Sibi Malayil
- Sithara
- Kunchan (actor)
- Kavya Madhavan
- Nadia Moidu
- Roma Asrani
- Tini Tom
- Guinness Pakru
- Narayanankutty
- Janardanan
- Shivaji Guruvayoor
- Prem Kumar
- Salim Kumar
- Harisree Ashokan
- Kalabhavan Shajohn
- Mamukkoya
- Sudheer Karamana
- Nadirshah
- Renji Panicker
- Alleppey Ashraf
- Ranjini
- Suresh Krishna

Music Industry

- P. Jayachandran
- K. G. Markose
- Sayanora Philip
- Stephen Devassy
- Jyotsna Radhakrishnan
- K. S. Chithra
- Vidhu Prathap and Deepthi
- Vaikom Vijayalakshmi

Serial actors

- Sona Nair
- Roopa Sree and Meghna Vincent
- Rekha ratheesh and Kottayam Pradip
- Lishoy and Leona Lishoy
- Gayathri Arun
- Sonu and Chitra Shenoy
- Premi Vishwanath and Akshara Kishor
- Kishor Satya and Renu Soudhar

Stand-up comedians

- Kottayam Nazeer
- Jayaraj Warrier

Sports

- S. Sreesanth

Magician

- Magician Samraj

== Popular Guests (season 2) ==
Episode No.	Guest(s)	Notes
1	Shane Nigam, Soubin Shahir	Kumbalangi Nights promotion
1	Rajesh Hebbar, Arun G Raghavan, Mrudula, Della, Pratheeksha, Dhanya Mary Varghese, Anoop, Anoop Sivasenan	For ammayi's wedding
2	Nadirsha, Nikhila Vimal	Mera Naam Shaji promotion
3	Kalidas Jayaram, Aishwarya Lekshmi	Argentina Fans Kaattoorkadavu promotion
4	Sharreth, Resul Pookutty	
5	Anusree, Shamna Kasim	Madhura Raja promotion
6	Anna Rajan, Appani Sarath	
7	Manju Warrier	
8	Vishnu Unnikrishnan, Bibin George	Oru Yamandan Premakadha promotion
9	Sheela	
10	Rafi, Dhruvan, Sharaf U Dheen	Promotion of Children's park
11	Darshana Das, Rini Raj, Pradeep Chandran	Promotion of Karuthamuthu
12	Sabumon Abdusamad, Aristo Suresh, Ranjini Haridas, Archana Suseelan	
13	Asha Sarath	promotion of Evidey
14	Jayaraj Warrier, Unda pakru	
15	P. Jayachandran, Sreekumaran Thampi	
16	Indrans, Dharmajan Bolgatty	
17	Naveen Nazim, Soubin Shahir	promotion of Ambili
18	Samyuktha Menon, Sudheesh	promotion of Kalki
19	Jayaram	Promotion of Pattabhiraman
20	Baiju, Sheelu Abraham	

== Awards ==
- Asianet comedy awards 2015 – Best Anchor – Ramesh Pisharody
- Flowers TV awards 2016–Best Anchor – Ramesh Pisharody
- Asianet Television Awards 2016 – Golden Star of the Year -Mukesh
- Asianet Television Awards 2016 – Entertainer of the Year – Ramesh Pisharody
- 2nd Asianet comedy awards 2016 – Versatile performance(TV)-Dharmajan
- 19th Asianet film awards Multifaceted Personality of the Year -Mukesh (actor)
- Santhadevi memorial awards 2017 for Best comedy actress -Arya Rohit
- 3rd Asianet comedy awards – Best Performer T.V. – Arya Rohit
- Asianet Television Awards 2018 – Golden Star of the Year -Mukesh
- Asianet Television Awards 2018 – Best Comedian (Non-Fiction) -Manoj Guinness
- 3rd Anand TV film awards – Multifaceted Personality (TV & Films) – Ramesh Pisharody
