= 916 (film) =

2012 film directed by M. Mohanan

- Theatrical poster
- Directed by: M. Mohanan
- Written by: M. Mohanan
- Produced by: K. V. Vijayakumar Palakkunnu
- Starring: Anoop Menon; Asif Ali; Malavika Menon; Mukesh; Monica
- Cinematography: Faisal Ali
- Edited by: Ranjan Abraham
- Music by: M. Jayachandran
- Production company: Aadhith Aishwarya Sneha Movies
- Distributed by: Central Pictures
- Release date: 10 November 2012
- Country: India
- Language: Malayalam

916 is a 2012 Indian Malayalam-language drama film written and directed by M. Mohanan, starring Anoop Menon,Mukesh, Asif Ali, Malavika Menon and Monica. The film is about maintaining the sanctity of familial relationships.

== Plot ==
916 focuses mainly on the relationship between a single father, Dr. Harikrishnan, and his 12th grade daughter Meera. It narrates the events of two closely knit families losing their balance; Harikrishnan's, and Dr. Ramesh's, his wife and their two children. While Dr. Harikrishnan is an altruist who considers his profession a means to serve society, Dr. Ramesh thinks otherwise. Prasanth appears as a romantic interest of Meera, leading her astray into the world of malls, cellphones, and the Internet. The movie comes to a twist when Meera goes missing.

== Cast ==
- Anoop Menon as Dr. Harikrishnan
- Mukesh as Dr. Ramesh
- Asif Ali as P. P. Prasanth Kumar
- Malavika Menon as Meera
- Meera Vasudev as Chandrika, Dr. Ramesh's wife
- Parvana as Lekshmi, Dr .Harikrishnan's wife
- Mammukoya
- Nandu as Karthik, Dr. Harikrishnan's aide
- Balachandran Chullikkadu as Narayanan, Lekshmi's aide
- Kottayam Nazeer as S.I. Babu
- Thalaivasal Vijay as Krishnankutty, Dr. Harikrishnan's father
- Archana Menon as Sister Susmitha, Nurse
- Devan as Shivaraman, Lakshmi's father
- Rony David as Sathyan. Lekshmi's brother
- George Peter as himself (Cameo in song Pizza)
- M. Jayachandran as himself (Cameo appearance)

== Soundtrack ==
Music was composed by M. Jayachandran.

Song	Length	Singer(s)	Picturization
"Naattumaviloru Maina"	4:08	Shreya Ghoshal	
"Kelkkan Kothikunna Paattu"	4:25	Sudeep Kumar	
"Chenthamara Theno"	3:58	Haricharan, Mridula Warrier	
"Pizza Pizza"	4:04	Benny Dayal, Suchitra	
"Kiliye Cherukiliye"	4:15	K. S. Chithra, Haricharan	

== Reception ==
916 got mixed reviews upon release. Kerala9.com gave the movie 2/5 stars, ending with a verdict "Not up to the mark; no ‘916 purity’...". theaterbalcony.com gave 68% and said that "It is great that 916 tried to bring lots of social awareness, however there should be an equal importance to the entertainment factor too, however the latter was missing from 916 most of the time"
