= Aakasha Kottayile Sultan =

- Directed by: Jayaraj
- Written by: Renji Panicker
- Produced by: K. T. Kunjumon
- Starring: Sreenivasan; Saranya Ponvannan; Innocent; Mamukkoya; K. P. A. C. Lalitha
- Cinematography: Anandakuttan
- Edited by: L.Bhoominathan
- Music by: Songs: Raveendran; Score; Johnson
- Release date: 1991
- Country: India
- Language: Malayalam

Aakasha Kottayile Sultan (transl. Sultan of the castle in the sky) is a 1991 Indian Malayalam-language film directed by Jayaraj, starring Sreenivasan and Saranya Ponvannan in lead roles.

== Cast ==
- Sreenivasan as Kesavan Kutty
- Saranya Ponvannan as Mallika
- Innocent as Dr. Chenthrappinni
- Mamukkoya as Cleitus
- K. P. A. C. Lalitha as Meenakshi
- Maniyanpilla Raju as Murali
- Zainuddin as Chenthrappinni's assistant
- Sankaradi as Pillaichan
- Oduvil Unnikrishnan as Ramakrishna Iyer
- Baiju Santhosh as Vishwambharan
- Murali as Georgekutty
- Prathapachandran
- Krishnan Kutty Nair
- Paravoor Bharathan as Raghavan Nair
- Alummoodan as Pappy
- Adoor Bhavani as Pappy's sister
- Manorama as Kumudam
- Mavelikkara Ponnamma as Mariyamma
- Meena as Pappy's sister
- Unnimary as Pappy's sister
- Santha Devi as Kesavan Kutty's mother
- Kalabhavan Rahman as Chenthrappinni's assistant
- Philomina as Pappy's sister
- Praseetha Menon as Kasthuri
- Alleppey Ashraf Doctor
- Pradeep Shakthi

== Soundtrack ==
The film's soundtrack contains 4 songs, all composed by Raveendran and Lyrics by O. N. V. Kurup.

#	Title	Singer(s)
1	"Poovaamkurunninnu"	K. S. Chitra, M. G. Sreekumar
2	"Thaazhvaaram"	M. G. Sreekumar
3	"Thaazhvaaram (Sad)"	M. G. Sreekumar
4	"Thulaseemaalayitha"	K. S. Chitra
