= Theertham (film) =

- Poster
- Directed by: Mohan
- Written by: Nedumudi Venu; Mohan (dialogues)
- Screenplay by: Mohan
- Produced by: G. Jayakumar; G.P. Vijayakumar
- Starring: Nedumudi Venu; Pallavi Joshi; Innocent; Thilakan
- Cinematography: Sunny Joseph
- Edited by: Ravi
- Music by: Bombay Ravi
- Production company: Seven Arts International LTD
- Distributed by: Seven Arts International LTD
- Release date: 12 February 1987
- Country: India
- Language: Malayalam

Theertham (lit. 'Holy water') is a 1987 Indian Malayalam film, directed by Mohan and produced by G. Jayakumar and G.P. Vijayakumar. The film stars Nedumudi Venu, Pallavi Joshi, Innocent and Thilakan in the lead roles. The film has musical score by Bombay Ravi.

== Cast ==
- Nedumudi Venu as Vishnu Namboothiri
- Pallavi Joshi as Sreedevi
- Innocent as Ouseppachan
- Thilakan as Chellappannan
- Venu Nagavally as Radhakrishnan
- Balachandran Chullikkad as Shivan
- Murali as Michael
- Babu Namboothiri as Surendran
- Balan Kattoor as Kuttappan
- Bindu as Rema
- Jagannathan as Mammadali
- KPAC Sunny as Doctor Ashokan
- Shari as Mercy
- Surasu as Sreedevi's father
- T. P. Madhavan as Sudhakaran
- Valsala Menon as Bank Manager
- Kollam Thulasi as Anoop
- Vettukkili Prakash as Kunjan Namboothiri
- Padmakumar as Cook Nair

== Soundtrack ==
The music was composed by Bombay Ravi and the lyrics were written by Kavalam Narayana Panicker and Balachandran Chullikkad. The song "Bas More Nainan" marks the first Malayalam song and the first South Indian song that Bollywood playback singer Alka Yagnik has ever sung.

No.	Song	Singers	Lyrics	Length (m:ss)
1	"Aathintho"	Nedumudi Venu, Chorus	Kavalam Narayana Panicker	
2	"Bas More Nainan"	Alka Yagnik	Balachandran Chullikkad	
3	"Ganapathiye Nin Achan"	Nedumudi Venu, Chorus	Balachandran Chullikkad	
