= Billu Barber =

2009 Indian film by Priyadarshan

- Theatrical release poster
- Directed by: Priyadarshan
- Screenplay by: Mushtaq Shiekh
- Dialogues by: Manisha Korde
- Story by: Sreenivasan
- Based on: Katha Parayumpol by Sreenivasan
- Produced by: Gauri Khan
- Starring: Irrfan Khan; Shah Rukh Khan; Lara Dutta
- Cinematography: V. Manikandan
- Edited by: Arun Kumar
- Music by: Songs: Pritam; Score: Sandeep Chowta
- Production company: Red Chillies Entertainment
- Distributed by: Eros International
- Release date: 13 February 2009 (India)
- Running time: 136 minutes
- Country: India
- Language: Hindi
- Budget: ₹27 crore
- Box office: est. ₹47.45 crore

Billu Barber is a 2009 Indian Hindi-language comedy drama film directed by Priyadarshan and produced by Red Chillies Entertainment. It stars Irrfan Khan, Shah Rukh Khan, and Lara Dutta in the lead roles. Kareena Kapoor, Priyanka Chopra, and Deepika Padukone make special appearances in three songs. It is a remake of the 2007 Malayalam film Katha Parayumpol and is loosely based on the story of friendship between Krishna and Sudama in the Bhagavata Purana.

The film was released on 13 February 2009 and received positive reviews from critics. It was screened at the 2009 Hawaii International Film Festival.

== Plot ==
Billu is a poor barber who lives with his wife Bindiya and their two children, Gunja and Ronak, in the village of Budbuda. He also spends time with his close friends Budbudiya and Naubat Chacha. Billu lives an uneventful life until Bollywood superstar Sahir Khan comes to the village for a film shoot.

Billu had mentioned to his family that he knows Sahir from the past but has never elaborated on how he knows the star. When his children talk about their father's friendship with the star, word spreads throughout the village. Virtually overnight, Billu, who had previously been scorned by most due to his lowly state, becomes the center of attention. People who had spurned him only the week before now call him a close friend so that he will introduce them to Sahir. Billu refuses and downplays the friendship. Even so, the powerful businessman Sahukaar Daamchand demands to see Sahir and offers Billu expensive gifts in order to gain such a meeting. When Billu consistently fails to introduce the people of the village to Sahir, his situation changes once again. He is accused of lying about his friendship, and everyone – including his wife and children – begins to doubt his character and integrity. Rather than defend himself, Billu remains quiet about the nature of his and Sahir's friendship.

On Sahir's last day in the village, the star speaks at Gunja and Ronak's school function. He tells the children about his impoverished childhood, when he had nothing but a special bond of friendship with another young boy, named Billu. It was Billu who had taken care of Sahir and eventually helped him travel to Mumbai by giving him his gold earring, where Sahir became a movie star. Billu, who is standing at the back of the event, leaves during the talk without revealing to Sahir that he is there. However, the townspeople, realizing their fault in ostracizing Billu, take Sahir to Billu's house. Billu's children come home and apologize to their father for the trouble they caused him. All of a sudden, Sahir enters Billu's home, reuniting with his best friend. They hug and embrace each other, with the whole village and Billu's family happily watching. In the end, Sahir must leave for another shoot but promises that his and Billu's friendship is reignited and will remain friends.

== Cast ==
- Irrfan Khan as Bilas Rao “Billu” Pardesi, a barber
- Shah Rukh Khan as Sahir Khan, a film star and Billu's childhood friend
- Lara Dutta Bhupathi as Bindiya Pardesi, Billu's wife
- Om Puri as Sahukaar Daamchand
- Atul Parchure as Charandas Chaube, a caretaker who wants to act in Sahir's film.
- Asrani as Naubat Chacha
- Rajeev Khandelwal as Pawan Sharma
- Rajpal Yadav as Zallan Kumar / Budbudiya
- Manoj Joshi as Damodar Dubey
- Jagadish as 'Modern' Madan
- Rasika Joshi as Principal Gahalot
- Mitali Mayekar as Gunja, Billu's daughter
- Pratik Dalvi as Ronak / Duggu, Billu's son

=== Special appearances ===
- Kareena Kapoor Khan in "Marjaani" as Sahir Khan's heroine
- Priyanka Chopra Jonas in "You Get Me Rockin & Reeling" as Sahir Khan's heroine
- Deepika Padukone in "Love Mera Hit Hit" as Sahir Khan's heroine

== Production ==
=== Casting ===
Director Priyadarshan cast Irrfan Khan, Shah Rukh Khan and Lara Dutta Bhupathi in pivotal roles in the film. While these roles were initially offered to Akshay Kumar and Tabu, Kumar eventually opted out of the project due to date clashes, as did Tabu. Priyadarshan then offered Kumar's and Tabu's role to Shah Rukh Khan and Ameesha Patel respectively, and both of them agreed to do the film. Patel also opted out of the film with sources indicating that Juhi Chawla was signed on for the role.

In April 2008, the director announced that he had cast Lara Dutta as Billu's wife. The cast began filming for the project on 8 April 2008 and according to Shahrukh Khan, "the film is a sweet story of friendship...quite similar to the bond shared between Krishna and Sudama". The film also features Kareena Kapoor Khan, Priyanka Chopra Jonas and Deepika Padukone Singh in item numbers with Shah Rukh Khan.

=== Filming ===
Filming took place in Pollachi, Tamil Nadu, and at Film City in Goregaon, Mumbai.

== Reception ==
Billu Barber opened to positive reviews. In reviewing the film, Derek Elley of Variety stated: "Bigtime Bollywood meets small-town India with quietly entertaining, finally moving results in Billu Barber. A simple tale of friendship cleverly manages to bring together superstar Shah Rukh Khan, in full-on pin-up mode, with Irfan Khan, who's developed into one of the industry's best character actors, in a movie that straddles both mainstream Hindi cinema and more specialty fare. Mid-February release, produced by Khan's own company, Red Chillies, won't approach the grosses of his last starrer, Rab Ne Bana Di Jodi, but is way more engaging on an emotional level". Lisa Tsering of The Hollywood Reporter states that Billu is a "Bollywood comedy about an unlikely friendship [that] is full of unexpected pleasures". Frank Lovece of Film Journal International describes the film as a "delight" and states, "What makes it work ... is that neither Billu nor his situation is played for laughs—his hardscrabble poverty isn't glossed over, and neither is his wife's longing for acceptance in the class-conscious village. And a climactic speech by Khan at a school gathering works fully well emotionally, despite a huge potential for hokiness—and incidentally provides concrete reason why real-life Khan, who's often starred in glowering action-hero roles, is a genuinely top-notch actor in addition to being a popular star". Times of India gave the film three stars and describes it as "a moving ode to friendship and ordinariness". While CNN-IBN's Rajeev Masand gave the film two out of five stars, he stated that it "works smoothly as a simple, moral tale, its charm interrupted every time the director goes for broader, more 'commercial' appeal. But it's enjoyable and heart-felt too, and for that reason deserves to be watched". Shashi Baliga of the Hindustan Times said that, "Though the film has its share of stock characters, maudlin and over-the-top moments and sags in the latter half, there's also good story-telling, some great acting, and a healthy dose of masala in the item numbers".

== Soundtrack ==
Billu Barber

Soundtrack album by Pritam
- Released: 5 January 2009
- Genre: Feature film soundtrack
- Label: T-Series
- Producer: Gauri Khan

Pritam chronology
Golmaal Returns (2008)	Billu Barber (2009)	Ek: The Power of One (2009)

The soundtrack was composed Pritam with lyrics written by Gulzar, Neeraj Shridhar, Sayeed Quadri, Ashish Pandit, and Mayur Puri.

The song "Khudaya Khair" was recorded by playback singer Abhijeet Bhattacharya who has rendered his voice for Shah Rukh Khan in several of his films. However, the song was withdrawn and was only used as a reprised version.

The song "Love Mera Hit Hit" was sampled by Serbian pop singer Anabela in her song "Igra Istine", by Serbian singer Dejan Stanković in his song "Kaligula" and by Macedonian singer Boki 13 in his song "Kaligula".

No.	Title	Lyrics	Artist(s)	Length
1.	"Marjaani"	Gulzar	Sukhwinder Singh & Sunidhi Chauhan	5:24
2.	"Love Mera Hit Hit"	Ashish Pandit, Mayur Puri	Neeraj Shridhar & Tulsi Kumar	4:46
3.	"You Get Me Rocking & Reeling"	Sayeed Quadri	Neeraj Shridhar & Dominique Cerejo	4:46
4.	"Ae Aa O"	Neeraj Shridhar	K.K., Suraj Jagan & Rana Mazumder	4:59
5.	"Jaaun Kahan"	Sayeed Quadri	Rahat Fateh Ali Khan	5:32
6.	"Billu Bhayankar"	Gulzar	Ajay Jhingran, Kalpana Patowary & Raghuveer	5:52
7.	"Khudaya Khair"	Gulzar	Soham Chakrabarty, Monali Thakur & Akriti Kakar	4:41
8.	"You Get Me Rocking & Reeling (Video Edit)"	Sayeed Quadri	Neeraj Shridhar & Dominique Cerejo	4:46
9.	"Love Mera Hit Hit" (House Mix)	Ashish Pandit, Mayur Puri	Neeraj Shridhar & Tulsi Kumar	4:59
10.	"Marjaani (Kilogram's Balkan Mix)"	Gulzar	K.K.& Akriti Kakar	4:13
11.	"Khudaya Khair (Reprise)"	Gulzar	Abhijeet Bhattacharya, Akriti Kakar	4:25
12.	"You Get Me Rocking & Reeling (Remix)"	Sayeed Quadri	Neeraj Shridhar & Dominique Cerejo	4:03
13.	"Ae Aa O (Remix)"	Neeraj Shridhar	K.K., Suraj Jagan & Rana Mazumder	5:31
14.	"Marjaani (Electro Mix)"	Gulzar	Sukhwinder Singh & Sunidhi Chauhan	4:46
15.	"Love Mera Hit Hit (Remix)"	Ashish Pandit, Mayur Puri	Neeraj Shridhar & Tulsi Kumar	4:38

== Controversy ==
The film was originally titled Billu Barber, but salon and beauty parlour associations of Bandra raised objections by finding the word "Barber" derogatory. As head of the film's production company, Shah Rukh Khan eventually removed the word from the movie title and promotions, renaming the film Billu. He also invited 'The Hairdressers' Association of Mumbai' members to the premier of the movie in order to assuage their protests.
