= My God (film) =

- Film poster
- Directed by: M. Mohanan
- Screenplay by: M. Mohanan; Geo Mathew; Nijo Kuttikad
- Produced by: Mahi Puthusseri, Shyna V
- Starring: Suresh Gopi; Manoj Guinness; Honey Rose; Sreenivasan; Master Adarsh
- Cinematography: Jithu Damodar
- Edited by: Ranjan Abraham
- Music by: Bijibal
- Production company: Karunya V. R Creations
- Distributed by: Anto Joseph Release
- Release date: 4 December 2015
- Country: India
- Language: Malayalam

My God is a 2015 Malayalam film directed by M. Mohanan, starring Suresh Gopi, Manoj Guinness, Sreenivasan, Honey Rose, Lena, Joy Mathew and Master Adarsh in prominent roles. The songs and background score were composed by Bijibal. The film was released on 4 December 2015.

== Plot ==
The movie narrates the resulting events in the life of Sam. Sam Thottunkal, the younger son of Thomas Scaria and Zareena is a teenager, is an introvert. It is when Sam's life becomes more and more complicated, he gets acquainted with Adiraja.

Movie narrates the resulting events in the life of Sam.

== Cast ==
- Suresh Gopi as Adiraja Bhattadiri
- Honey Rose Dr. Arathi Bhattathiripadu
- Manoj Guinness as Chacko
- Sreenivasan as ft Vadakkan
- Lena
- Joy Mathew as Thottumkal Thomas Chandy
- Master Adarsh as Sam Thottumkal
- Indrans
- Sreejith Ravi
- Praveen Prem
- Chali Pala
- Kalabhavan Haneef
- Abhi Madhav
