= Makante Achan =

2009 film by V. M. Vinu

- Film poster
- Directed by: V. M. Vinu
- Written by: Samjad Narayanan
- Produced by: Seven Arts International; G.P. Vijayakumar (executive producer)
- Starring: Sreenivasan; Vineeth Sreenivasan
- Cinematography: Manoj Pillai
- Edited by: P. C. Mohanan
- Music by: M. Jayachandran (songs); Ouseppachan (score)
- Production company: Seven Arts
- Distributed by: Seven Arts Release
- Release date: 23 January 2009
- Running time: 140 minutes
- Country: India
- Language: Malayalam

Makante Achan (transl. Son's father) is a 2009 Indian Malayalam-language coming-of-age comedy drama film directed by V. M. Vinu, written by Samjad Narayanan, and produced by Seven Arts International. It stars Vineeth Sreenivasan, Sreenivasan and Suhasini in the lead roles

== Plot ==
Viswanathan, an honest and principled government official who is the village officer, hopes that his son Manu will secure admission to the National Institute of Technology Calicut and pursue a career in engineering. Manu, however, aspires to become a singer. To prepare him for the entrance examinations, Viswanathan enrols him in a coaching centre run by K. C. Francis, a retired flight engineer and Indian Air Force officer known for his strict discipline and constant surveillance of students through CCTV cameras. Despite Manu's repeated requests to his mother, Rema, to allow him to return home and participate in television singing reality shows, Viswanathan remains determined that he focus on his studies.

Meanwhile, a self-styled godman named Himaval Chithanya Swami establishes an ashram in the village. Viswanathan's friend Krishnankutty and his wife Santhanavally seek the swami's blessings in the hope of having a child. Subsequently, several of Himaval Swami's disciples approach Viswanathan to obtain approval for a proposed 90-acre project. After examining the proposal, Viswanathan determines that the project is illegal and refuses to grant the necessary sanction.

After failing the engineering entrance examination, Manu is reprimanded by Viswanathan, who, believing his son has been dishonest, slaps him. Distressed by the incident, Manu leaves home. Two days later, Viswanathan discovers Manu working as a waiter at a hotel, leaving him heartbroken and leading him to develop a drinking habit. Unbeknownst to Viswanathan, Manu has also been participating in a television singing reality show.

Meanwhile, Himaval Swami assaults Viswanathan in retaliation for refusing to approve the proposed illegal project. Viswanathan is later found injured and admitted to hospital, where he gives a statement to the police. Based on his testimony, Himaval Swami and several of his followers are arrested. Following the arrests, a group of villagers led by Krishnankutty sets fire to the ashram.

Before the final round of the reality show, Manu reconciles with his father. He subsequently wins the competition.

== Cast ==
- Vineeth Sreenivasan as Manu Viswanathan
- Sreenivasan as Viswanathan, a village officer, Manu's father
- Suhasini as Rema Viswanathan, Viswanathan's wife and Manu's mother
- Salim Kumar as Krishnan Kutty
- Jagathy Sreekumar as Himaval Chithanya Swami, main antagonist
- Janardhanan as Kurup
- Thilakan as K. C. Francis, retired flight engineer and air force officer, principal of K. C. F. entrance coaching centre
- Suresh Krishna as Police Officer
- Varada as Ann
- Revathy Sivakumar as Dhanya Viswanathan, Manu's sister
- Bindu Panicker as Santhanavally, Krishnankutty's wife
- Augustine as Vachaspathy (Kooman Kumaran)
- Sreelatha Namboothiri as Kurup's wife
- Sharreth as himself (cameo appearance)
- Ouseppachan as himself (cameo appearance)
- Chitra Iyer as herself (cameo appearance)
- Sreekala Sasidharan as herself (archive footage)

== Soundtrack ==
- "Ee Vennilavint" - Vineeth Sreenivasan
- "Himaval Swami" - Kavalam Sreekumar
- "Othorumichoru" - Vineeth Sreenivasan

== Reception ==
The film was a commercial success at the box office and was one of the highest-grossing Malayalam films of that year. Sreenivasan won the Asianet Film Award for Best Supporting Actor for the film.
