= M. Mohanan =

Filmmaker

- Occupations: Film director; Assistant director; Writer
- Years active: 2007–present
- Spouse: Sheena

M. Mohanan is an Indian director working in the Malayalam film industry. He began writing in college and was encouraged by the actor Sreenivasan who gave him confidence writing scripts. He worked as an assistant director to Sathyan Anthikad for 14 films.

He is the recipient of Kerala State Film Awards for Best Story and Best Popular Film. His movies include Katha Parayumpol (2007), Manikyakkallu (2011), 916 (2012) and Aravindante Athidhikal (2018).

== Filmography ==
Year	Title	Writer(s)	Notes
2007	Katha Parayumpol	Sreenivasan	Directorial debut
2011	Manikyakkallu	M. Mohanan	
2012	916	M. Mohanan	
2015	My God	M. Mohanan, Geo Mathew, Nijo Kuttikad	
2018	Aravindante Athidhikal	Rajesh Raghavan	
2025	Oru Jaathi Jathakam	Rakesh Mantodi	
