= Kuselan =

2008 Indian film by P. Vasu

- Poster
- Directed by: P. Vasu
- Screenplay by: P. Vasu
- Story by: Sreenivasan
- Produced by: G. P. Vijay Kumar; Pushpa Kandaswamy; C. Ashwini Dutt
- Starring: Rajinikanth; Pasupathy; Meena
- Cinematography: Arvind Krishna; A. D. Karunamoorthy (Additional cinematography)
- Edited by: Saravana
- Music by: G. V. Prakash Kumar
- Production companies: Kavithalayaa Productions; Seven Arts Films Production
- Distributed by: Ayngaran (Worldwide); Pyramid Saimira (US)
- Release date: 1 August 2008
- Running time: 159 minutes
- Country: India
- Language: Tamil
- Budget: ₹15 crore
- Box office: ₹8 crore

Kuselan is a 2008 Indian Tamil-language dramedy film directed by P. Vasu. An official remake of the Malayalam film Katha Parayumpol (2007), it was produced by Pushpa Kandaswamy, Aswani Dutt and G. P. Vijayakumar in two languages. Kuselan stars Rajinikanth in an extended special appearance with Pasupathy and Meena. It also stars Vadivelu and Livingston in supporting roles. The film was simultaneously made in Telugu as Kathanayakudu. Meena reprised her role from Katha Parayumpol in both Kuselan and Kathanayakudu.

The plot revolves around a villager, who had shared a strong friendship with a popular cinema actor in his youth. However, due to their different careers, they were forced to part ways, one becoming a national figure, the other, a village barber. Decades later, the actor returns to the village to participate in his film's shooting. Whilst the entire village becomes excited about the prospect of seeing the actor, the barber fears that his old friend would have forgotten him and would neglect him.

Kuselan opened to audiences on 1 August 2008, taking the third-largest opening for a Tamil film up until the date of release. Despite the hype before release, the film ended up evoking negative reviews and was a flop at the box office. Prior to release, the film was heavily marketed by the producers as a Rajinikanth-starrer, although Rajinikanth himself had made it clear that he was only appearing an extended special appearance.

== Plot ==
Balakrishnan is a poor barber living in the small village of Marayoor alongside his wife, Sridevi, and three children. He has a small independent barbershop in the marketplace. However, another barber named Shanmugam owns a much more developed independent barbershop, and he has employees and revolving chairs. His family criticises Balakrishnan for not paying the school fees on time. A local goon named Kuppusamy also disrupts the number of visitors to Balakrishnan's barbershop. He can get his daughter back into school after advising the nun working at his daughter's school, who offers to pay the fees herself. An actor named Nagercoli Nagaraj unexpectedly visits the village and demands heavy amounts of daily supplies. Kuppusamy asks why, and Nagercoil explains that Kollywood actor Superstar Ashok Kumar will be in town for several movie shoots.

When Ashok Kumar arrives alongside several other actors participating, including Nayanthara, Vijayakanth, and Nizhalgal Ravi, the village gives them a huge welcome. Since the locality is near the Tamil Nadu-Andhra Pradesh border, the Naxalite–Maoist insurgency is raging across the border. The District collector told Ashok Kumar that the filming procedure should be done elsewhere for his safety, but Ashok Kumar disregarded this. So Senthilnathan IPS, who leads heavy police reinforcements, gets called to the village. Balakrishna states that 30 years ago, Ashok Kumar and Balakrishna were best friends who became distant as time passed. She and the children asked Balakrishna if they could meet Ashok Kumar and take a photo with him. Balakrishna worries that Ashok might have forgotten about him since people with fame and money usually forget about their past. Shanmugam's wife, Sona, asks Shanmugan if they could get a photo with Ashok Kumar. Shanmugam tried several techniques, but his methods were unsuccessful.

Sridevi starts spreading the news that her husband, Balakrishnan, and Ashok Kumar were friends in childhood. Balakrishnan was relatively popular, and people believed he could bring Ashok Kumar to take photos with everyone. Meanwhile, Ashok Kumar is developing two films: Vettaiyan and Annamalai 2. Both films are sequels to previous films he created: Chandramukhi and Annaamalai. Kuppusamy helps Balakrishnan renovate the barbershop. Shanmugam successfully breaks into Ashok Kumar's guest house and disguises himself as a helper. He gets a photo of Ashok Kumar with his wife and proudly shows it to the village. People are uncertain if Balakrishana was a friend of Ashok Kumar, as a commoner got a photo with Ashok Kumar but not him. Kuppusamy is angered when he concludes that Balakrishnan lied. He tells the entire village, which causes his children to get backlashed, and they start disliking their father.

His eldest daughter's school managed to get Ashok Kumar to attend a function for him at the school. It was also his last filming day. Balakrishnan decides to fulfil Sridevi's desire of at least seeing Ashok Kumar, and they attend the school function. Ashok Kumar makes an emotional speech, recalling his childhood days when he was destitute, about his best friend, Balakrishnan. Balakrishnan helped Ashok Kumar during his hard times when he did not have money for clothes and food and even suggested that Ashok Kumar gets into acting. Ashok Kumar tearfully explains that Balakrishnan gave him everything, even selling his ear studs to send him to Madras. He says that he became rich because of him. When they return home, his children ask for forgiveness for ignoring him. Then Ashok Kumar unexpectedly visits them and emotionally reunites with Balakrishnan. He then suggests to Balakrishnan that he move to Chennai, where he could give Balakrishnan and his family a house near his barbershop. Although Balakrishnan declines, Ashok Kumar tells him that he and his family is all that he has and makes arrangements for them to stay with him. Before Ashok Kumar leaves, Balakrishnan brings a peanut candy and feeds Ashok, who also reciprocates and share a few moments of joy before declaring to the people that Balakrishnan is his best friend.

== Cast ==
- Rajinikanth as Superstar Ashok Kumar, a very famous Kollywood actor (extended special appearance)
- Pasupathy as "Barber Balu" Balakrishnan
- Meena as Sridevi "Devi", Balakrishnan's wife
- Prabhu as Senthilnathan IPS
- Vadivelu as "Saloon Kadai" Shanmugam (Balu's former assistant)
- Shafna as Balakrishna's elder daughter
- Revathy Sivakumar as Balakrishna's younger daughter
- Livingston as Kuppusamy
- R. Sundarrajan as Srinivasan
- Manobala as Sub-Inspector
- M. S. Bhaskar as Gopi, Kuppusamy's assistant
- Santhanam as "Nagercoil" Nagaraj
- Chinni Jayanth as Pasimani
- Vaiyapuri as Sathya, Kuppuswamy’s assistant
- O. A. K. Sundar as Hari, Kuppusamy's assistant
- Santhana Bharathi as Chandran, Kuppuswamy’s assistant
- Tanikella Bharani as School teacher
- Thyagu
- Mayilswamy
- Kavithalaya Krishnan as Shopkeeper
- Mohan Ram as Ashok Kumar's PA
- Shankar as Barber shop worker
- Singamuthu as Barber shop worker
- Geetha as Headmistress
- Fathima Babu as Sister Maria
- Rajitha
- Sona as Sona
- Cool Suresh as Nagercoil's Nagaraj's assistant
- Nellai Siva
- Soundar
- Thalapathy Dinesh
- Bava Lakshmanan
- Ashok Raja
- Bonda Mani as Shanmugam's sidekick
- T. P. Gajendran as Ramesh
- Sampath Ram as Police officer (uncredited)

Cameo appearances

- Nayanthara as Herself
- Brahmanandam as Tribal
- Mamta Mohandas as an assistant director
- Vijayakumar as himself
- Nizhagal Ravi as himself
- Madhan Bob as himself
- Raj Bahadur as himself

Special appearance in the song "Perinba Pechchukaran"

- Suja Varunee as herself

Special appearances in the song "Cinema Cinema"

- Suriya as himself
- Dhanush as himself
- Khushbu Sundar as herself
- Sneha as herself
- K. Balachander as himself
- G. V. Prakash Kumar as himself
- P. Vasu as himself
- Soundarya Rajinikanth as herself

== Production ==
=== Development ===
Following P. Vasu and Rajinikanth's film, Chandramukhi in 2005, Vasu had been keen to re-cast Rajinikanth in another role and, before signing Kuselan, he had narrated a story titled Vettaiyan, which would have been a sequel of a character featured in Chandramukhi. Early in 2008, Rajinikanth signed up for S. Shankar's Enthiran, while Kuselan was launched at the Taj Coromandel in Chennai on 14 January 2008 coinciding with Pongal. The director, P. Vasu signed up Rajinikanth and Pasupathy to portray the lead roles, while director K. Balachandar agreed to produce the Tamil version of the film along with G.P. Vijayakumar's Seven Arts Productions, while Aswani Dutt agreed to produce the film in Telugu with Rajinikanth and Jagapati Babu starring. Ileana D'Cruz turned down an offer to act in the film, citing date problems. The film is a remake of the Malayalam movie, Kadha Parayumbol which was written by Sreenivasan who also played the lead role in the movie.

In the Telugu version, comedy actors Sunil and Venu Madhav all signed up to play the roles of Jagapati Babu's fellow villagers. Like the Tamil version, it was said that several prominent Telugu actors had been approached to be a part of a song in the project, but none were selected.

Vasu made it clear that Rajinikanth would not be doing an honorary role in the film, which Mammooty had portrayed in the original, but will play a full role, describing that "the whole story revolves around him [Rajnikanth]". The film's launch was halted on 7 March 2008 at the AVM Studios in Chennai with the leading artistes present. P. Vasu, while talking to the media mentioned that the shooting lasted 82 days with the versions being shot simultaneously and that most of the movie was shot inside the Ramoji Rao film city, with other destinations including Kerala and Pollachi.

A promotional event took place on 19 July 2008 at the Jawarhalal Nehru Stadium. The event focused on the music by G. V. Prakash Kumar.

=== Casting ===
Apart from the role of Rajinikanth, Vasu intended to use entirely different casts in either version of the bilingual film. Livingston, Manobala and Santhana Bharathi were added to the cast of the Tamil version, along with Vadivelu who pipped Vivek, Santhanam and Goundamani to land the role, even though Santhanam managed another role in the film. Furthermore, director S. P. Muthuraman agreed to play a guest role in the film. Nayantara accepted the role, opposite Rajinikanth. however finding a female lead opposite Pasupathy was more difficult for the director, with Simran, Tabu and Sneha all being considered for the role. However, Meena who played the role in the original, was offered the role in early February 2008 and accepted it. Throughout the production stages, it had been indicated that several prominent film personalities will appear in cameo appearances throughout the film, however no leading actors were approached. Indications later revealed that five actresses would appear opposite Rajinikanth in a song with the selected being Nayantara, Mamta Mohandas, Khushbu, Suja and Sneha all of whom apart from Nayantara, play minor roles. G. V. Prakash Kumar operated as the music composer while Arvind Krishna was the cinematographer.

== Soundtrack ==
Kuselan: The Official Motion Picture Soundtrack

Soundtrack album by G. V. Prakash Kumar
- Released: 1 July 2008
- Genre: Feature film soundtrack
- Length: 29:43
- Labels: Big Music; T-Series
- Producer: G. V. Prakash Kumar

G. V. Prakash Kumar chronology
Ullasamga Utsahamga (2008)	Kuselan: The Official Motion Picture Soundtrack (2008)	Ananda Thandavam (2008)

The soundtrack of Kuselan was released on 30 June 2008. The background score has been composed by G. V. Prakash Kumar along with five songs. The song Cinema Cinema commemorates the 75th anniversary of Tamil cinema. S. P. Balasubrahmanyam, Sneha, Mamta Mohandas, Suriya, Dhanush, Khushbu Sundar and Soundarya Rajinikanth appear in this song along with Rajinikanth, Nayantara and Vijayakumar. Sivaji Ganesan, M. G. Ramachandran, Rajkumar and N. T. Rama Rao, are also shown in this song. This was the first Rajinikanth Tamil film since 1987 in which S. P. Balasubrahmanyam was not cast in the soundtracks.

Song	Singers	Length (m:ss)	Lyrics
"Cinema Cinema"	Shankar Mahadevan	6:08	Vaali
"Sollamma"	Hariharan, Sujatha Mohan, Baby Ranjani, Baby Pooja	6:13	Pa. Vijay
"Om Zaarare"	Daler Mehndi, K. S. Chithra, Sadhana Sargam	7:12	Vaali
"Chaaral"	Shreya Ghoshal	4:34	Kiruthiya
"Perinba Pechukaran"	Kailash Kher, V. V. Prasanna	5:36	Yugabharathi

== Reception ==
=== Box office ===
Kuselan became the third largest release in the history of Tamil cinema, extracting 1000 prints worldwide, numbers exceeded only by Rajinikanth's previous venture, Sivaji. The film upon release, despite the initial hype before release, received negative reviews and unexpectedly took a lukewarm opening at the box office. Unlike previous Rajinikanth films, on day two of its release, tickets were available in almost all theatres across Tamil Nadu, with the film failing to get advance bookings. Traders blamed the producers for using Rajinikanth's "larger than life image" to sell it to distributors, Pyramid Saimira for $12 million, when they knew very well that he was only doing a special appearance. More than $1 million worth of unauthorized DVDs were seized around India featuring Kuselan. In Karnataka, Rajinikanth's home state, Kuselan failed to bring in $300,000, despite being sold for $600,000. Pyramid Saimeera declared a loss of ₹ 403.2 million in the 3rd financial quarter of 2008 (a loss of nearly US$8 million, the highest loss for a single film in the Tamil film industry's 100-year history).

Overseas, Kuselan opened at number 12 at the UK box office, but slid heavily the following week. The film was still labelled as a "colossal flop".

=== Critical response ===
The film, upon release, garnered mainly negative reviews. Rediff.com criticized the film as "rushed", however praised Pasupathy mentioning that he comes "out the winner" in acting scenes, citing that his portrayal was "poetic". Meena is criticized, with the reviewer claiming that she "tries hard to re-create the original version's magic, but perhaps she has been told to over-do it for Tamil: she wears lipstick and pastel shades of saris for every other scene, while trying to prove that they have no idea where the next meal's going to come from". As for the script, "the freshness of the original has been denuded a little to accommodate dialogues that extol the many virtues of the superstar", becoming worse than that of the original. Whilst labelling Vadivelu as providing "antics are the ones that really make you grin", the rest of the supporting actors Manobala, M. S. Baskar, Livingston and Vaiyapuri "are absolutely wasted". Director P. Vasu is criticized by claiming that his "script must shoulder the responsibility of how Kuselan has ultimately turned out" with the only saving grace being "the original story, which pulls the screenplay from descending into nothing". G. V. Prakash Kumar and Thotta Tharani were also singled out by the Rediff reviewer for their adequate performances in their respective fields.

Reviewers also claimed that the producers and P. Vasu had attempted to capitalize on Rajinikanth's fan following in the film. The Deccan Herald reported that "It’s a big con to exploit brand Rajni and make a quick buck. He himself gallops in on a flying horse almost half way through the tortuous proceedings. His oneliners and quirks fall flat. If at all we are able to see flashes of the Rajni of yore, it’s towards the dying moments. By then it’s too late". This claim was echoed by one Sify.com review claiming the film "tries desperately to glorify Rajinikanth’s larger than life superstardom and create a halo around him as a do-gooder and a saint in real life. It loses its focus and moves away from the gist of the original, which was a simple story about human emotions, based on friendship between an ordinary barber and a superstar." In contrast, another Sify.com review praised the film labelling it as "above average". It claims that "Rajinikanth towers above all others, especially in the climax scene where there is a lot of melodrama and the human emotions are well etched out". Pasupathy has a "pained expression throughout" whilst "Meena just repeats her performance in the Malayalam version". It however criticizes Vadivelu who is described as "a bit crass and below-the-belt", in reference to his scenes with Sona Heiden. It adds that "Kuselan is quite an enjoyable watch and is different from previous Rajinikanth films" and that the "touching climax will leave a lump in your throat".

== Controversy ==
During the 2008 hunger strike organised by SIFAA against Karnataka's stance on the Hogenakkal Falls water dispute, Rajinikanth reprimanded politicians in Karnataka. Further, he appealed to leaders not to inflame the water project issue for political gains and requested that the issue should be resolved soon. He urged the Karnataka politicians "to speak the truth". "They cannot be fooled and will not remain silent if you continue to act in such manner," he stated. Vatal Nagaraj, a Kannada activist and leader of the Kannada Chaluvali Paksha, demanded an apology from Rajinikanth and threatened that he would not be allowed in the state of Karnataka and all his films would be boycotted. In an effort to save the economy of Tamil cinema in Karnataka and ensure welfare of Tamil Nadu-based filmmakers, Rajinikanth made a brief media appearance on the news channel TV9 Kannada and clarified his speech, issuing an apology. Following the release of Kuselan in Karnataka, Rajinikanth thanked the Kannada film industry for allowing the release of the film and lifting the ban. Fellow actors R. Sarathkumar, Sathyaraj and Radha Ravi condemned the apology, with the latter calling it a disgrace to Tamils.
