= Vadakkunokkiyantram =

- DVD cover
- Directed by: Sreenivasan
- Written by: Sreenivasan
- Produced by: Toffy Kannara; T. C. Mony
- Starring: Sreenivasan; Parvathy
- Cinematography: Venu
- Edited by: N. Gopalakrishnan
- Music by: Johnson
- Production company: Kavyakala Film Unit
- Distributed by: K.R.G. Enterprises
- Release date: 19 May 1989
- Running time: 120 minutes
- Country: India
- Language: Malayalam

Vadakkunokkiyantram (transl. Compass) is a 1989 Indian Malayalam-language black comedy film written and directed by Sreenivasan, who also stars in the film along with Parvathy. The film is about the marital discord caused by a husband's Othello syndrome. The film won three Kerala State Film Awards, including Best Film. It was dubbed in Telugu as Sandeham and remade in Tamil as Dindigul Sarathy, in Kannada as Nanjangudu Nanjunda and in Hindi as Main, Meri Patni Aur Woh.

== Plot ==
Thalathil Dineshan oversees a printing press. He struggles with insecurity due to his short stature and dark complexion. Following his marriage to Shobha, his life starts to spiral out of control. His wife is incredibly attractive and taller than he is, which just to his insecurities. He overprotects his wife at first, which deteriorates his connection with his brother Prakashan. He perceives his brother's charm and humor as a challenge, which finally causes a family quarrel to break out.

Dineshan gradually employs strategies that, in his opinion, will help him win Shobha's respect and adoration. Thalakulam Sir, whom he sees as a new confidant, offers him juvenile advice on how to impress Shobha. He starts drinking because he sees it as a macho gesture. To make himself seem amusing, he memorizes jokes from a weekly magazine and repeats them to his wife. But all of his endeavors are futile, and he makes a fool of himself.

Shobha, a model wife, is wholly loyal to her husband and finds Dineshan's odd conduct perplexing. He has paranoid thoughts and begins to doubt whether his wife is faithful to him. He threatens the brother of Shobha's friend, whom he thinks is having an affair with her. As soon as Shobha discovers everything, events spiral out of his control. After a few events caused by acute paranoia, he is sedated in a psychiatric hospital.

He seemed to have altered after a brief course of treatment. By promising her love and care, Dineshan is able to bring Shobha back to her house. Now that everything appears to be going well for them and while his wife is sleeping soundly, he begins to scan his backyard in the middle of the night for Shobha's stalker.

== Cast ==
- Sreenivasan as Thalathil Dineshan
- Parvathy as Shobha
- Innocent as Thalakulam Sir
- K.P.A.C. Lalitha as Dineshan's Mother
- Baiju as Thalathil Prakashan, Dineshan's brother
- Lalu Alex as Capt. S. Balan
- C. I. Paul as Raghavan Nair, Shobha's father
- Usha as Thankamani, Dineshan's sister
- Bobby Kottarakkara as Sahadevan, worker at Dineshan's press
- Jagadish as Vinod Kumar Alleppey
- Nedumudi Venu as Doctor
- Lissy as Sarala, Shobha's friend
- Sankaradi as Thalathil Chanthu Nair, Dineshan's maternal uncle
- Mamukkoya as Photographer
- Oduvil Unnikrishnan as Policeman
- Sukumari as Shobha's Mother

== Reception ==
The film was a critical as well as commercial success at the box office.

== Legacy ==
Vadakkunokkiyantram deals with the themes of insecurity, paranoia and inferiority complex approached in a both poignant and comedic manner. Some of the awkward and unfunny jokes used by Dineshan for impressing his wife have become infamous as well as the photograph scene. The character names of Nivin Pauly and Nayanthara in Love Action Drama (2019) was based on this film.

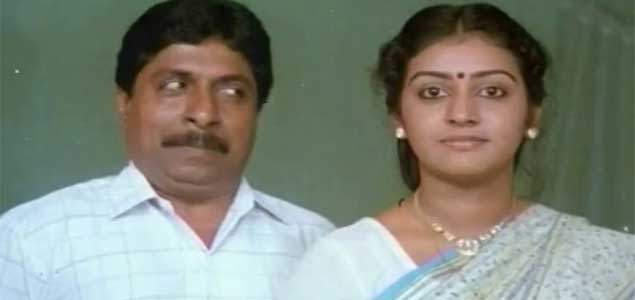
Sreenivasan and Parvathy in Vadakkunokkiyantram

== Awards ==
- Kerala State Film Award for Best Film
- Kerala State Film Award for Best Music Director - Johnson
- Kerala State Film Award for Best Male Playback Singer - M. G. Sreekumar
