= Thacholi Varghese Chekavar =

- Theatrical release poster
- Directed by: T. K. Rajeev Kumar
- Written by: P. Balachandran
- Produced by: G. P. Vijayakumar
- Starring: Mohanlal; Urmila Matondkar; Nedumudi Venu; Thilakan; Vineeth
- Cinematography: Venu
- Edited by: Venugopal
- Music by: Sharreth
- Production company: Seven Arts International
- Distributed by: Seven Arts Release; Bhavachithra Release
- Release date: 5 May 1995
- Country: India
- Language: Malayalam

Thacholi Varghese Chekavar is a 1995 Indian Malayalam-language martial arts action thriller film directed by T. K. Rajeev Kumar and written by P. Balachandran, starring Mohanlal in the title role, along with Urmila Matondkar, Nedumudi Venu, Thilakan and Vineeth. The film features a soundtrack composed by Sharreth.

The plot follows Varghese, a Kalaripayattu expert who is persuaded by his favourite disciple Shyam to rescue his lover Maya from house arrest. Varghese kidnaps her but soon realises that Shyam lied and Maya is the only witness of a homicide.

== Plot ==
Varghese is a Kalari master, and Shyam, his favourite disciple. One day, he comes to his master, declaring his love for Maya. He says that her parents have kept her under house arrest, and he needs his help to rescue her.

Varghese kidnaps Maya and brings her to Shyam, but Shyam tries to kill her. Varghese understands that Shyam is not her lover, and she is the only witness in another homicide which involves Shyam. But Maya tells Varghese that Shyam is innocent. Shyam, who still does not know this, pursues her. Varghese conceals her and brings the real culprit out by means of a rare locket that Maya remembers the killer wearing.

== Cast ==
- Mohanlal as Aanamadayil Vargheachan Chekavar aka Varghese
- Urmila Matondkar as Maya
- Horse Babu as Mathiloor Rajan Panicker
- Nirosha as Annie Kutty
- Vineeth as Shyam
- Thilakan as Avarachan
- K. P. A. C. Lalitha as Aleyamma
- Nedumudi Venu as father Joseph Kurushingal
- Janardhanan as Mathukutty
- Cochin Haneefa as Puthooran
- Valsala Menon as Subhadra
- T. P. Madhavan
- Madhupal as Venu
- Kollam Thulasi as Police Officer
- Kanakalatha
- Sreeja
- Praseetha Menon
- Jaganathan
- Ajith Kollam
- Antony Perumbavoor as College Student
- Vimal Raj as D'cruz (Policeman)

== Soundtrack ==
The film features original songs and score composed by Sharreth. The soundtrack album was released by Millennium Audios and Sony Music Entertainment.

Thacholi Varghese Chekavar (Original Motion Picture Soundtrack)
No.	Title	Singer(s)	Length
1.	"Soorya Nalam" (Version I)	K. J. Yesudas, Sujatha Mohan	4:45
2.	"Maleyam"	K. S. Chithra	4:53
3.	"Nee Onnu Padu"	M. G. Sreekumar, Swarnalatha	4:06
4.	"Poothidambe"	K. J. Yesudas	3:45
5.	"Veerali Pattum"	Srinivas	4:13
6.	"Nadodi Thalam"	K. J. Yesudas	3:10
7.	"Soorya Nalam" (Version II)	K. J. Yesudas	4:01
8.	"Soorya Nalam" (Version III)	Sujatha Moahn	4:01
