= Magician Samraj =

Indian magician and illusionist

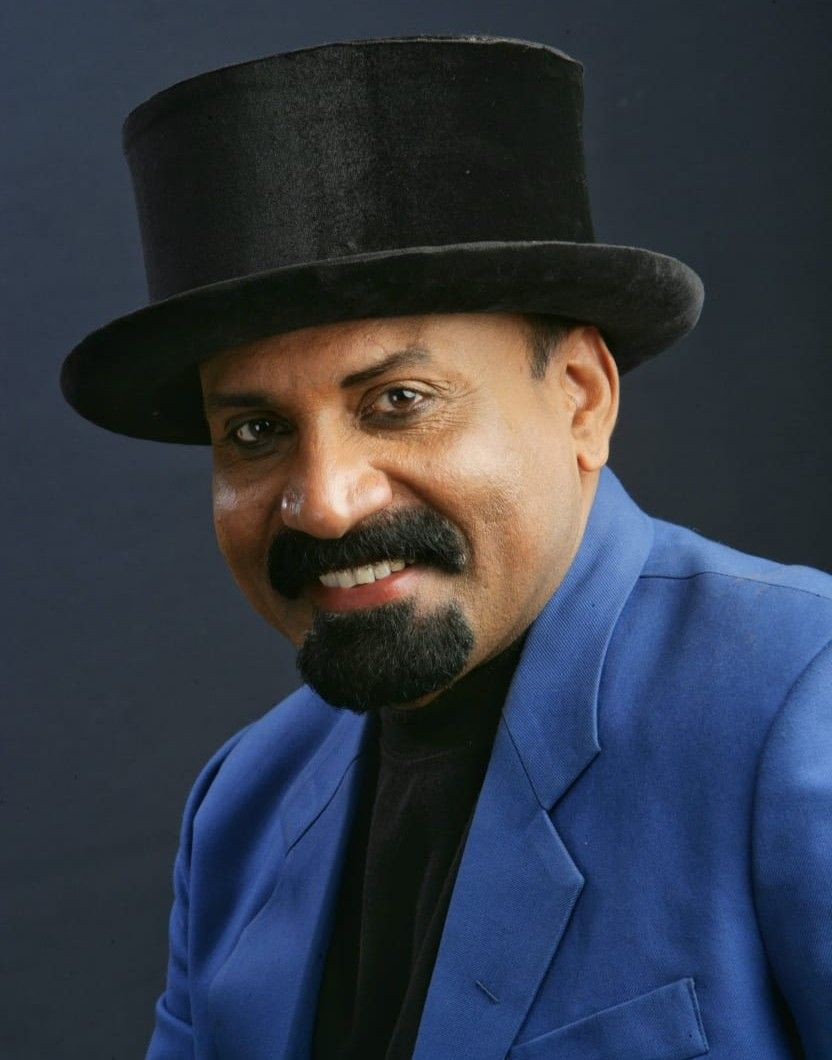
- Born: George Samuel; 1956 (age 69–70); Alappuzha
- Occupations: magician and illusionist
- Parent(s): Geevarghese George; Mariyama George
- Website: www.magiciansamraj.in

Magician Samraj, also known as George Samuel, is an Indian performing magician and illusionist from the southern Indian state of Kerala. He is also known as "The Indian Houdini" and has performed over 8,000 shows. Samraj is also notable for being the first person to perform "horror magic".

== Early life ==
Samraj's interest in magic began from age 7, when a street magician came to the school where he studied. The magician put sand in an empty can, closed it and upon reopening pulled out green grapes, which stunned Samraj. When he figured out the trick, he expressed his interest in becoming a magician to his parents, who told him to concentrate on his schoolwork. He later became a professional engineer. Years later, his interest was re-prompted by a street magician who cheated him out of his money. He then quit his job working in the Middle East and pursued magic full-time.

He lives at Mavelikera at a distance of 100 km from the state capitol.

== Famous Performances ==
- Great Fire Escape Act
- Graveyard Escape Act
- Great Jail Break
- Train Vanishing Act
- Bomb Blast Escape Act
- The Great Indian Magic Tour

== Awards and achievements ==
| Year | Award | Note | Reference |
|---|---|---|---|
| 2014 | Melin Award ( Oscar of Magic) | Installed by the International Magicians Society, USA gave away by its World President Magician Tony Hassini | |
| 2016 | Guinness World Records | | |
| 2025 | Golden Magic Award | Indian Magic Academy, Vishakhapatnam | |

== Books ==
- പേടിക്കേണ്ട മജിഷ്യൻ സാമ്രാജാണ്
- ക്രിസോസ്റ്റം നർമ്മങ്ങളും കേൾക്കാത്ത കഥകളും
