= Katha Parayumpol =

2007 Indian film by M. Mohanan

- Theatrical release poster
- Directed by: M. Mohanan
- Written by: Sreenivasan
- Produced by: Mukesh; Sreenivasan
- Starring: Sreenivasan; Meena; Mammootty
- Cinematography: P. Sukumar
- Edited by: Ranjan Abraham
- Music by: M. Jayachandran
- Production company: Lumiere Film Company
- Distributed by: Seven Arts International Ltd.
- Release date: 14 December 2007 (India)
- Running time: 130 minutes
- Country: India
- Language: Malayalam

Katha Parayumpol (transl. When the story is told) is a 2007 Indian Malayalam-language comedy drama film directed by M. Mohanan, written by Sreenivasan, and co-produced by Sreenivasan and Mukesh. It stars Sreenivasan, Mammootty, and Meena. The film was considered a commercial success.

The plot follows barber Balan, a poor villager who once shared a strong friendship with present-day film actor Ashok Raj, and later parted away. Decades later, the Raj returns to the village for a film shooting. Whilst the villagers are excited to see the actor, Balan distances himself fearing that his old friend would have forgotten him.

== Plot ==
The story revolves around the life of a barber named Balan in a small village called Melukavu in Kerala. The barber is financially constrained and has to raise a family with three children. His wife Sridevi is beautiful and belongs to a high caste who had eloped with him. He is not able to cope with the competition from a new air-conditioned beauty salon/parlor opened by Sarasan, opposite his shop. He does not get a license or a loan for the salon. He is in debt and is ridiculed by everyone in the village. Life is tough for him – he does not have money for a square meal, let alone his children's school fees

One day the village wakes up to the news that a Malayalam movie is going to be shot there, with superstar Ashok Raj as the hero. News spread that Ashok Raj is coming to the village for the ten-day shoot. The whole village is excited preparing for the superstar's arrival. Slowly, a word spread around that Balan and Ashok Raj are childhood friends. Balan, who was a laughing stock, suddenly becomes the center of attention. Everyone goes out of their way to help and please Balan, so that they can get a chance to meet and get various favors from his superstar friend. Balan gets under immense pressure because of this attitude of the villagers. Even his family starts asking him to meet and renew the friendship with Ashok Raj. Balan tries his best to approach the superstar, but his honesty and status of barber does not allow him to pass through the heavy security. When the villagers know that Balan is not able to help them, they start thinking that he was lying about his friendship with Ashok Raj and take back their support, abusing and making even more fun of him. Balan, depressed and sad, goes back to his old self.

Ashok Raj is invited to a function in the local school where he gives a ceremonial speech. He talks about the present day life, modernization, the state of good people etc., opening the eyes of everyone to the sad truth of people's behavior. During the speech, he reveals the fact that Balan was indeed his best friend who was the first person to realize the acting talent in him and tears up in front of the audience, revealing that he has been missing Balan all this while. That evening, Ashok Raj meets his long-lost friend Balan at his house, and Balan becomes an overnight hero in the eyes of his village.

== Controversy ==
It is stated by Sathyachandran Poyilkavu that this was originally his story. While working at a bookstore in Kozhikode, he established contacts with officials at Kairali Books, which was based in Kannur and owned by Sreenivasan. He got in touch with Prakash Kumar, who worked at Kairali Books, and promised that a character in his next film would be named after him (the character played by Prakash Raj in Katha Parayumbol). Prakash Kumar agreed and shared Sreenivasan's contact details.

In 2004, Sathyachandran called Sreenivasan from a telephone booth near Kozhikode Medical College. He said he had stories for two films that would suit Sreenivasan best. Sreenivasan asked him to share them, so Sathyachandran narrated both over the phone. The first story was Katha Parayumbol, in which all the characters were based on real people living in Poyilkavu (Sathyachandran's birthplace near Koyilandi). This included Barber Balan, the people who played stone games using the slabs from Balan's barbershop door, the rich man in the village, and the person who ran the tutorial college,even their names were the same. He also suggested that in the climax, when the superstar (Prakash Raj) visits, he should walk straight into the kitchen rather than waiting at the entrance to ring the bell or call out, in order to show their deep intimacy.

Sreenivasan said he liked the first story and asked if Sathyachandran could come to Madras (Chennai) to write the script. Sathyachandran explained that he couldn't because his mother was ill, though he might try to come for one or two days at most. However, he offered to share a script he had already written. Sreenivasan asked him to send it to Kairali Books. When Sathyachandran offered to send it directly to Madras so it would reach him faster, Sreenivasan declined, saying he was visiting Pariyaram Medical College and was planning to shift back to Kerala. Sathyachandran subsequently handed the script over to Prakash Kumar at Kairali Books.

After some days passed, Sathyachandran called Sreenivasan to follow up. Sreenivasan told him that the story he had narrated over the phone did not translate well into the written script and lacked the same spark. Sreenivasan then asked about his background and how life was going, and told him to send another story if he had one so he could take a look.

Later, in 2007, news broke in film magazines that Sreenivasan was making a film based on the "Barber Balan" story. Since he did not own a mobile phone in 2007, Sathyachandran called Sreenivasan from a phone booth and asked if the film was being made from his script. Sreenivasan replied, "Yes, but since you couldn't come to Madras when I asked, I planned it with others. You can go to Kairali Books and collect some money." However, when Sathyachandran contacted Prakash Kumar at Kairali Books, Prakash said Sreenivasan had never mentioned anything of the sort.

He later contacted Sreenivasan again using a friend's phone. The friend spoke with Sreenivasan for 30 minutes before handing the phone to Sathyachandran, mentioning to Sreenivasan, "this phone has a recording function too." When Sathyachandran spoke, Sreenivasan said that everything was already finalized, nothing could be done, and hung up.

Later, as a diversionary tactic, Sreenivasan allegedly arranged for someone in Thalassery to hold a press conference claiming the story was theirs. At his own press meet, Sreenivasan remarked, "Because the story is good, many people are claiming it is theirs." In another interview with a film magazine, Sreenivasan stated, "A mentally unstable madman from Kozhikode (hinting at Sathyachandran from Koyilandi, Kozhikode) claimed that this is his story. He should be put in a mental hospital."

Sathyachandran filed legal cases for story theft as well as defamation. The defamation case ran for nine years in the Koyilandi court, with a top advocate representing Sreenivasan.

By this time, the film had become a massive hit in Kerala,bigger than ever. Sreenivasan and Mukesh also sold the remake rights for Hindi (Billu Barber, starring Shah Rukh Khan) and Tamil (Kuselan).

Around then, Sreenivasan and Mukesh announced that they were starting a film institute in Koyilandi, Sathyachandran's hometown. This silenced local reporters and community members from speaking up for Sathyachandran, as they hoped to get opportunities or film roles through the institute. Furthermore, the person who acted as the "film director" in Katha Parayumbol was actually one of the mediators Sathyachandran had originally asked for help,who, after speaking with Sreenivasan, had told Sathyachandran that nothing could be done.

Ultimately, Sathyachandran never received credit or money for his script for Katha Parayumbol, which was later remade into Billu Barber and Kuselan and became pan-Indian blockbusters, despite the fact that all the real-life characters from Poyilkavu and scenes were his, not just a basic story thread. This mirrored what happened to Siddique-Lal with the film Nadodikattu, where Sreenivasan initially took the story and only gave them credit during the film's second run after pressure from director Fazil.

When Sreenivasan appeared on an Amrita TV programme in the later stages of his illness, he was severely affected by paralysis. He was seated in a wheelchair, unable to move much of his body, and his speech had become difficult to understand.During the programme, when others brought up the film *Kadha Parayumbol* and its story, Sreenivasan fell silent and appeared lost in thought. Tears began streaming down his face, and he broke down and cried on stage when the singer who had sung for *Kadha Parayumbol* performed the film's song while praising Sreenivasan as a brilliant screenwriter.

== Cast ==
- Sreenivasan as E.P. Balachandran aka Balan, a Barber
- Mammootty as Superstar Ashok Raj, a very famous Mollywood actor and Balan's childhood friend (extended cameo appearance)
- Meena as Sreedevi Balachandran, Balachandran's wife
- Mukesh as Venu
- Innocent as Eappachan Muthalali
- Jagadish as Sarasan
- Shafna as Sona Balachandran
- Revathy Sivakumar as Seena Balachandran
- Jagathy Sreekumar as Bharathan, Government Officer (Guest appearance)
- K. P. A. C. Lalitha as Rebeccam School Principal
- Suraj Venjaramoodu as Pappan Kudamaloor
- Mamukkoya as Chandykunju,
- Kripa as Shamna
- Shivaji Guruvayoor as Kuriakose
- Kottayam Nazeer as Idikkatta Varkey
- Augustine as Scariah Thomas aka Thomachan
- Sadiq as Sundaran, Police Officer
- Salim Kumar as Das Vadakkemuri
- Vettukili Prakash as Vijayan, Villager
- Manikandan Pattambi as Hari, a Villager
- Majeed as Balan's Neighbour
- Jasveer Kaur as Lead actress in the song Mambulli, along with Superstar Ashok Raj (Cameo appearance)
- Vishnu Unnikrishnan as a student in tuition class

== Production ==
The film was mainly shot at various locations in Melukavu.

== Soundtrack ==
The film's soundtrack was composed by M. Jayachandran.

1. "Maambulli" - Swetha, Vineeth Sreenivasan (Lyrics: Gireesh Puthenchery)
2. "Vethyasthanam" - Pradeep Palluruthy (Lyrics: Anil Panachooran)

== Box office ==
The film was both commercial and critical success. It was released in 40 centers on the occasion of Christmas alongside Flash, Kangaroo and Romeo and emerged the winner. It was the highest grossing Malayalam film of January 2008 despite the release of the highly anticipated Of the People and the Jayaram starrer Novel. In 12 weeks, the film grossed 1.03 crore from Thiruvananthapuram and Kozhikode. The film ran for 150 days in theatres.

== Remakes ==
Following the success it enjoyed in Malayalam, the film was remade in Tamil as Kuselan and Telugu as Kathanayakudu. Sreenivasan's role was played by Pasupathi in Tamil and Jagapathi Babu in Telugu. Mammootty's role was played by Rajnikanth in both Tamil and in Telugu. But both these versions strayed from the original with many extra characters and changes in the storyline resulting in dismal failures.

Meena reprised her role from original movie in both Tamil and Telugu remakes along with Shafna and Revathy Sivakumar, who played the role of her children.

Priyadarshan was highly impressed with the film that he immediately bought the remake rights of the film for Hindi. He screened the film to Shah Rukh Khan, who was impressed with the film that he signed onto the Hindi remake, Billu, as well as producing it under his company, Red Chillies Entertainment. Khan suggested to Priyadarshan that he stick to the original script, sans any alterations. However, owing to the immense success and following of Deewangi Deewangi, from Om Shanti Om (2007), 3 item numbers with Kareena Kapoor, Deepika Padukone, and Priyanka Chopra were added into the film.

Noted Kannada actor and director, Ramesh Aravind, announced that he obtained the remake rights of the film in Kannada as well. However, it failed to materialize and was shelved.

A 30 minute Malayalam advertisement film was released in 2017 directed by Lal Jose titled Katha Veendum Parayumbol which is a recreation of film with main characters reprising their roles from the film.
