= Pyramid Saimira =

Multinational Indian entertainment company

- Type: Film production Film distribution Film soundtrack distribution Exhibition
- Traded as: BSE: 532791; NSE: PSTL
- ISIN: INE165H01018
- Industry: Entertainment, Software
- Headquarters: Chennai, India
- Area served: India, China, Malaysia, Singapore, USA, UK
- Key people: Mr.PS Saminathan, Mr N Narayanan
- Products: Motion pictures (Tamil)

Pyramid Saimira, an Indian multinational entertainment company, operating in 6 countries was one of the World's fastest growing entertainment group. Its diversified businesses included Exhibition (Theatre), Film and Television Content Production, Distribution, Hospitality, Food & Beverage, Animation and Gaming, Cine Advertising, etc., which has significantly altered the profile of Tamil Nadu cinema, the Tamil film music scene and entertainment industry in India at large. Its founder and CEO died on 28 Jun 2019 due to diabetics related illness.

== Filmography ==
=== Distribution ===
- Aanai (2005)
- Mozhi (2007)
- Satham Podathey (2007) Sivaji 2007 For Malaysia VCD & DVD
- Billa (2007)
- Evano Oruvan (2007)
- Azhagiya Tamil Magan (2007)
- Ali Bhai (2007)
- Vaazhthugal (2008)
- Arasangam (2008)
- Kuselan (2008)
- Saroja (2008)
- Naan Kadavul (2009)

=== Production ===
- Kannamoochi Yenada (2007)
- Aayudham Seivom (2008)

== Debts, Problems and Closure ==
Following the failure of Kuselan (2008), the production studio began to experience significant financial problems which affected several of their ongoing projects. The releases of films including Krishna's Yen Ippadi Mayakkinai starring Richard and Gayathrie and Jeppi Azhagar's Vaanam Partha Seemayile starring Ashok and Priyanka Nair, were sudden cancelled despite having audio releases. Likewise, Shankar Dayal's Anandham Arrambam, which was meant to be the launch for actor Adharvaa Murali, was also shelved despite beginning production. Kamal Haasan's bilingual period film, Marmayogi, was also scrapped after Pyramid Saimira were unable to finance the venture.

In the year 2010, the management was struck by debts ranging to Rs.500 Crore and cases were filed on it by SEBI for breaching its terms and finally closed down.

Share investors were duped by company's false auditing practices and internal scams. The promoter assured investors in their AGM that everything was in order and also acknowledged to make a dividend payout as a good will measure. It's another blot in ethics and corporate governance of the promoters.

== Key Personalities ==
These are the people who are mainly responsible for Pyramid Saimira.

- Mr. P.S. Saminathan Group CEO and CFO
- Mr. K.S.Srinivasan Director & CEO – Pyramid Saimira Production International Ltd
- Mr. Satish Shukla CEO – Saimira Access Technologies Limited
- Mr. T.A.Adikesavan President-Management Services(MS) & Knowledge Management Systems (KMS)
- Mr. R. Venkatakrishnan Chief Operating Officer (COO) --- Saimira Realty Limited
- Mr. G. Gowtham President – Marketing & Movie Cards, PSTL
- Mr. T.Sivakumar CEO – PSTL Exhibition
- Mr R Chandrasekar, GM (Distribution)
- Mr. Ram Mohan Rao President – Content Procurement, PSEL
- Mr. S.Ganesan Group Company Secretary
- Mr. A.S.Satish Kumar CEO – Pyramid Saimira Theatre Chain (M) Sdn Bhd
- Mr. V.Srinivasan Chief Technical Officer
- Mr. Alok Kumar Vice President – Food & Beverages
- Ms. Subhaa Venkat General Manager – Productions & Creativity
- Ms. Purvi Shah COO – Western Region | Global Head – Corporate Communication
- Mr. G.K.Kalidasan Vice President – HR
