= Vidhyarambham =

- Directed by: Jayaraj
- Written by: Sreenivasan
- Produced by: G. P. Vijayakumar
- Starring: Sreenivasan; Gautami; Nedumudi Venu; KPAC Lalitha; Murali
- Cinematography: A. V. Thomas
- Edited by: L. Bhoominathan
- Music by: Bombay Ravi
- Production company: Seven Arts
- Distributed by: Seven Arts
- Release date: 21 December 1990
- Country: India
- Language: Malayalam

Vidhyarambham is a 1990 Indian Malayalam language film, directed by Jayaraj and produced by G. P. Vijayakumar. The film stars Sreenivasan, Gautami, Nedumudi Venu, KPAC Lalitha and Murali in the lead roles. The film has musical score by Bombay Ravi.

== Plot ==
Madhavan Ezhuthachan has been trying to open a school in his native village so the children won't have to walk miles to a distant school. There are several interesting characters in the village. Koppath Bharghavan Nambiar, a patriotic freedom fighter; Natarajan, a horse-cart driver; R. K. Nedungadi, president of a Hindu temple; Govindan Nair, a postman; Venkitesan, Ezhuthachan's loyal servant and K. K. Jacob, an aimless hunter. Ezhuthachan lives Bhanumathi and has a son, Prabhakaran, who lives far from the family. After a long haul, Ezhuthachan's school gets official permission to operate. He and his allies cleans and renovates the building. To celebrate the good news, Ezhuthachan and his allies host a small party within themselves. Amidst the jollity, Ezhuthachan dies from a stroke. Following his death, his son files for partition at the court, thereby halting the school's operation. At that juncture, P. K. Sudhakaran arrives at the village only learn that the school has closed. He becomes desperate as he has spent a fair sum of money for the teacher's post. He does several things to regain his post or money and becomes the nidus for the story's progression.

One day, when he comes to Ezhuthachan's house to discuss his money, he sees Prabhakaran forcefully taking away the coconut crop of the household with his men, without speaking to Bhanumati or her mother. He tries to stop Prabhakaran and ends up getting beaten up by him. He approaches a previous acquaintance of his, a lawyer, and convinces Bhanumati and her mother to file a case against Prabhakaran, who is contesting his court stay against the school operation. During the court hearing, Sudhakaran's lawyer presented evidence that Prabhakaran had already gotten Ezhuthachan to transfer a couple of properties and a timber sawmill in his name. Sudhakaran's advocate argues that since Ezhuthachan has already given lot of rightful property to Prabhakaran, the school should not be given to him and should be given to Bhanumati and her mother as their rightful share as Ezhuthachan's second wife.

Since things do not look in favor of Prabhakaran from the court, he approaches Sudhakaran and tries for a compromise as per his advocate's advice. However, Sudhakaran dismisses him straightaway, saying that he does not need the money from Prabhakaran and that Bhanumati and her mother should get their rightful share, too. He warms up to Bhanumati and her family and reveals that he is expecting a favorable decision from the court about school. On coming back his advocate summons him home and reveals that Bhanumati's mother is not legally married to Ezhuthachan and that Bhanumati is not her daughter. She was born to her mother and another person who died long back. He advises Sudhakaran to accept the compromise proposal from Prabhakaran since they will lose the case if the opposition discovers this detail. Sudhakaran again sees Prabhakaran and successfully negotiates a truce, agreeing to accept the money and back out. When they discuss the same over a party, Sudhakaran, in an intoxicated state, reveals this truth to Prabhakaran and requests him to back out from the case also. During the next hearing, Prabhakaran's advocate also presents this information to the court, thereby putting the case in their favor. Filled with remorse, Sudhakaran reveals his mistake to Bhanumati before going away from the place. That day Bhanumati's mother discloses to her that she had eloped with her lover against her family's wishes and married him. Her relatives murdered her husband due to this when Bhanumati was still a baby. Ezhuthachan, who was Bhanumati's father's close friend, takes up their responsibility and starts living with them as family since his first wife had died already. The next day, when Bhanumati and their mother are about to leave the village, Sudhakaran comes and announces that the government has decided to take over the school, and he will get employment in the same place. He convinces Bhanumati and her mother not to leave the village, and the movie ends with the school finally starting in the village with Sudhakaran and Bhanumati.

== Cast ==
- Sreenivasan as P. K. Sudhakaran
- Nedumudi Venu as Madhavan Ezhuthachan
- Gautami as Bhanumathi: daughter of Madhavan's colleague
- KPAC Lalitha as wife of Madhavan's colleague
- Murali as Prabhakaran: Madhavan's son
- Sankaradi as Koppath Bhargavan Nambiar
- Jagadish as Natarajan
- Mamukkoya as Venkiteshan
- Maniyanpilla Raju as Advocate
- Prathapachandran as Advocate
- Alummoodan as R. K. Nedungadi
- Bobby Kottarakkara as Raghavan
- Oduvil Unnikrishnan as Kumaran Vaidyar
- Paravoor Bharathan as Govindan Nair
- Philomina as Madhavi
- K. K. Jacob

== Soundtrack ==
The music was composed by Bombay Ravi and the lyrics were written by Kaithapram. The songs were released by Tharangini Records.

No.	Song	Singers	Lyrics
1	"Paathiraakkombil"	K. J. Yesudas	Kaithapram
2	"Poovarambin"	K. S. Chithra	Kaithapram
3	"Uthraalikkaavile"	K. J. Yesudas	Kaithapram
