= Varavelpu =

- Poster
- Directed by: Sathyan Anthikad
- Written by: Sreenivasan
- Produced by: K. Rajagopal
- Starring: Mohanlal; Revathi; Sreenivasan; Murali; Innocent; Thilakan
- Cinematography: Vipin Mohan
- Edited by: K. Rajagopal
- Music by: Johnson
- Production company: K. R. G. Movie International
- Distributed by: K. R. G. Enterprises
- Release date: 7 April 1989
- Running time: 145 minutes
- Country: India
- Language: Malayalam

Varavelpu (transl. Welcoming) is a 1989 Indian Malayalam-language black comedy film directed by Sathyan Anthikad and written by Sreenivasan, starring Mohanlal, Revathi, Sreenivasan, Thilakan, Murali, Innocent, and Jagadish. The film was produced by K. Rajagopal. It depicted trade union problems plaguing Kerala and the issues created by union members and the dirty politics which is prevalent in present governance and is narrated in a satirical dark comedy

The film was based on a real-life incident in Sreenivasan's father's life. The film was an average grosser at box office but later gained a cult status and following. The movie was remade in Hindi as Chal Chala Chal.

== Plot ==
Murali returns to his hometown after spending 7 long years hard working in the gulf to settle down peacefully in his hometown. Much against the greedy wishes of his family members, he decides to buy a second-hand bus that comes along with a route permit. This is when he faces a lot of hardships. Starting from an accident because of the inefficient driver, a cheating conductor, to a cunning union leader, Murali's life is taken for a toss with ever-growing challenges one after the other.

He eventually gets an offer from a labour officer, which he turns down. He says that he has already lost this game, and he prefers to move for a better job. At last, it is shown that he leaves for Bombay in order to go back to gulf.

== Cast ==
- Mohanlal as Murali
- Revathi as Rema
- Sreenivasan as a vehicle inspector
- Murali as Prabhakaran
- Jagadish as Valsan
- Thilakan as Ramakrishnan
- Innocent as Chathukutty
- Janardhanan as Kumaran
- Oduvil Unnikrishnan as Narayanan
- Mamukkoya as Hamsa
- Sankaradi as Murali's uncle
- K. P. A. C. Lalitha as Santha
- Meena as Rukmini
- Thikkurissy Sukumaran Nair as Govindan Nair
- Bobby Kottarakkara as Pappan
- Krishnan Kutty Nair as Rema's father
- Praseetha Menon
- Sindhu Varma

== Production ==
The film was based on a real-life incident in Sreenivasan's father's life. Sathyan Anthikkad got the story idea while listening to Sreenivasan when he recalled how his family ended in financial debt as his communist father was labeled a capitalist after he bought a bus.

== Soundtrack ==
Varavelpu

Soundtrack album by Johnson
- Released: April 1989
- Genre: Feature film soundtrack, popular music
- Label: Tharangini Records

All lyrics are written by Kaithapram Damodaran; all music is composed by Johnson.

No.	Title	Artist(s)	Length
1.	"Doore Doore Sagaram Thedi"	K. J. Yesudas
2.	"Vellara Poomala Mele"	K. J. Yesudas
3.	"Doore Doore Sagaram Thedi"	K. S. Chithra

== Reception ==
In 2003, the then Indian Prime Minister Atal Bihari Vajpayee mentioned the film and Mohanlal in his inaugural speech at the Global Investor Meet held in Kerala. He said: "I am told that there is a Malayalam movie called Varavelppu in which your famous actor Mohanlal acts as a Gulf-returned Keralite. He invests his savings in a small business venture with high hopes. But in the end, he is forced to close it down after going through many unpleasant experiences. Therefore, this conference should serve as an occasion for introspection".
