= Sreenivasan =

Indian actor and filmmaker (1950–2025)

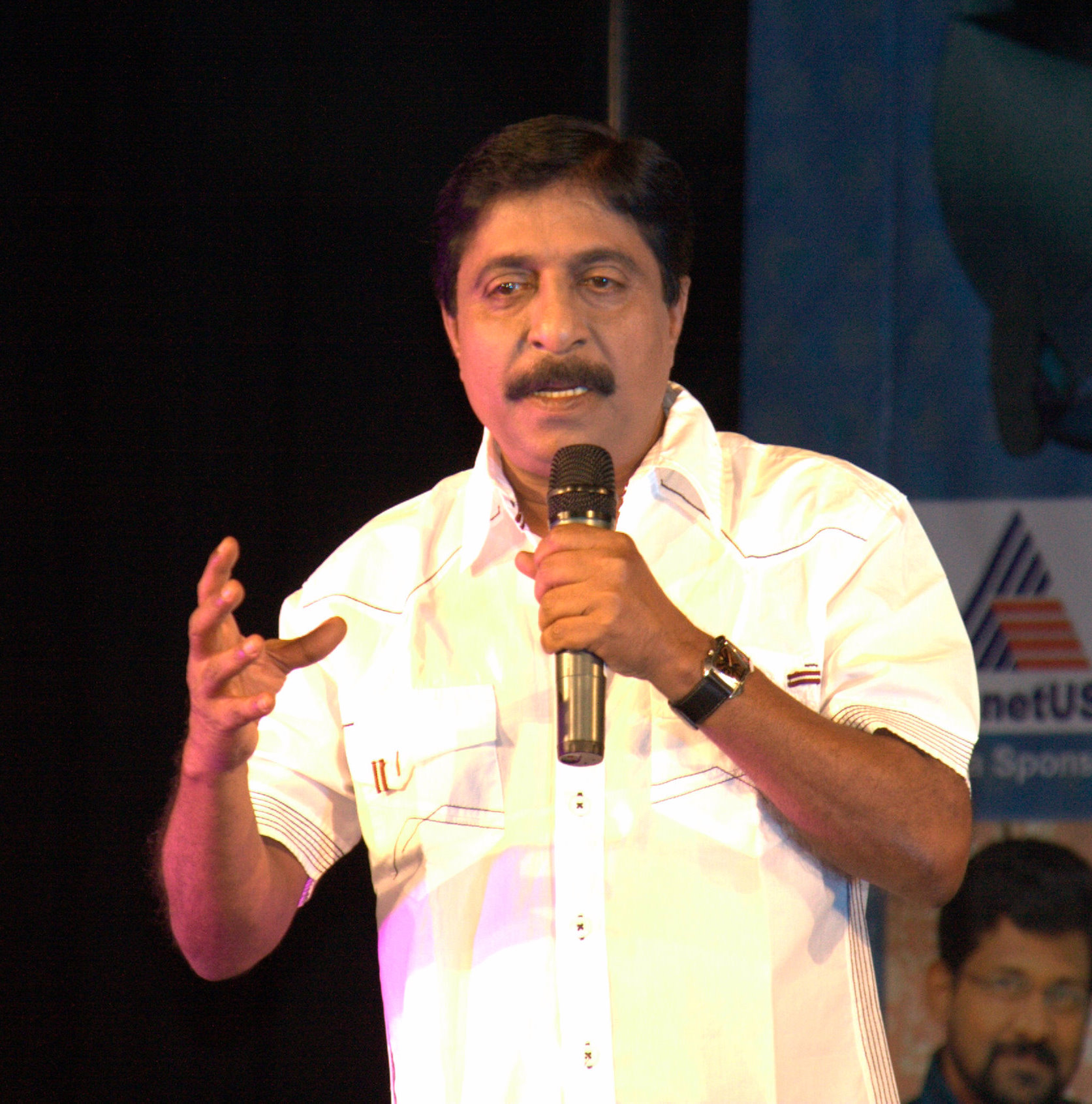
- Sreenivasan in 2010
- Born: 2 May 1950; Pattiom, Kannur district, Kerala
- Died: 20 December 2025 (aged 75); Thrippunithura, Kochi, Kerala
- Education: Pazhassi Raja N. S. S. College, Mattanur, Madras Film Institute
- Occupations: Actor; screenwriter; film director; film producer
- Years active: 1977–2025
- Works: Full list
- Spouse: Vimala Sreenivasan
- Children: Vineeth Sreenivasan; Dhyan Sreenivasan
- Awards: National Film Awards; Kerala State Film Awards

Sreenivasan (2 May 1950 – 20 December 2025) was an Indian actor, screenwriter, film director and producer who predominantly worked in Malayalam cinema. He starred in over 225 films. Sreenivasan wrote the screenplays of films such as Odaruthammava Aalariyam (1984), Sanmanassullavarkku Samadhanam (1986), Gandhinagar 2nd Street (1986), Nadodikkattu (1987), Pattanapravesham (1988), Varavelpu (1989), Thalayana Manthram (1990), Sandesam (1991), Midhunam (1993), Mazhayethum Munpe (1995), Azhakiya Ravanan (1996), Oru Maravathoor Kanavu (1998), Udayananu Tharam (2005), Katha Parayumpol (2007), and Njan Prakashan (2018), the latter being one of the highest-grossing Malayalam films of all time. He won two Kerala State Film Awards for Best Screenplay for Sandesam and Mazhayethum Munpe, along with several other honours including a National Film Award, two Filmfare Awards South and six Kerala State Film Awards.

As a writer and actor, he frequently collaborated with directors such as Priyadarshan, Sathyan Anthikad and Kamal. As a filmmaker, he scripted and directed Vadakkunokkiyanthram (1989) and Chinthavishtayaya Shyamala (1998). Vadakkunokkiyanthram won the Kerala State Film Award for Best Film, while Chinthavishtayaya Shyamala won the National Film Award for Best Film on Other Social Issues and the Kerala State Film Award for Best Film with Popular Appeal and Aesthetic Value at the 29th Kerala State Film Awards. He co-produced Katha Parayumpol (2007) and Thattathin Marayathu (2012) under the banner Lumiere Film Company, along with actor Mukesh.

== Early life ==
Sreenivasan was born in Pattiom, a village near Kuthuparamba in Kannur district of Kerala. He has a sister and two brothers. His mother was a homemaker and his father a school teacher. Sreenivasan completed his formal education at Kuthuparamba Middle School and Government High School, Kadirur. He received a bachelor's degree in economics from Pazhassi Raja N. S. S. College, Mattanur. In 1977, he joined the Film and Television Institute of Tamil Nadu in Chennai to complete his formal training in films.

== Career ==
Sreenivasan debuted in the 1976 P. A. Backer movie Manimuzhakkam. His first lead role was in Sanghaganam (1979). At film school, he was enrolled by Aniyeri Prabhakaran, who later cast him in Mela (1980). In 1984, Sreenivasan wrote his first film, Odaruthammava Aalariyam. He both wrote and acted in Varavelpu, Gandhinagar 2nd Street, Nadodikkattu and its two sequels, Pattanapravesham, and Akkare Akkare Akkare. As a director he filmed Vadakkunokkiyanthram and Chinthavishtayaya Shyamala. His comedies include Aram + Aram = Kinnaram, Kinnaripuzhayoram, Mazha Peyyunnu Maddalam Kottunnu, Ponmuttayidunna Tharavu, Artham, Azhakiya Ravanan, and Chithram.

Sreenivasan’s scripts in the 1980s and 1990s were profoundly successful in creating a new dimension for Malayalam cinema by way of humor to show vibrant and engaging stories of ordinary people in the simplest manner, usually with fast-paced scripts. Many of the characters he created, most of them taken from his real-life experience, drew the viewers into compelling narratives that kept them immersed in their journey through the movie. Through his satires, he addressed the challenges of unemployment and socioeconomic inequality. Sreenivasan portrayed diverse characters within his movies.

== Personal life and death ==
Sreenivasan was married in 1984 to Vimala, a school teacher, now retired. The couple has two sons. The elder son, Vineeth Sreenivasan, is a singer, actor, producer, and director. The younger son, Dhyan Sreenivasan, is also an actor, director, and producer who made his debut in the movie Thira. Divya Narayanan and Arpita Sebastian are his daughters-in-law.

Sreenivasan died at Taluk Hospital in Tripunithura, Kochi, on December 20, 2025, after being ill with Triple Vessel Disease for a long time, at the age of 75.

== Controversy ==
It is stated by Sathyachandran Poyilkavu that script of Katha Parayumpol was originally his story. While working at a bookstore in Kozhikode, he established contacts with officials at Kairali Books, which was based in Kannur and owned by Sreenivasan. He got in touch with Prakash Kumar, who worked at Kairali Books, and promised that a character in his next film would be named after him (the character played by Prakash Raj in Katha Parayumpol). Prakash Kumar agreed and shared Sreenivasan's contact details.

In 2004, Sathyachandran called Sreenivasan from a telephone booth near Kozhikode Medical College. He said he had stories for two films that would suit Sreenivasan best. Sreenivasan asked him to share them, so Sathyachandran narrated both over the phone. The first story was Katha Parayumpol, in which all the characters were based on real people living in Poyilkavu (Sathyachandran's birthplace near Koyilandi). This included Barber Balan, the people who played stone games using the slabs from Balan's barbershop door, the rich man in the village, and the person who ran the tutorial college,even their names were the same. He also suggested that in the climax, when the superstar (Prakash Raj) visits, he should walk straight into the kitchen rather than waiting at the entrance to ring the bell or call out, in order to show their deep intimacy.

Sreenivasan said he liked the first story and asked if Sathyachandran could come to Madras (Chennai) to write the script. Sathyachandran explained that he couldn't because his mother was ill, though he might try to come for one or two days at most. However, he offered to share a script he had already written. Sreenivasan asked him to send it to Kairali Books. When Sathyachandran offered to send it directly to Madras so it would reach him faster, Sreenivasan declined, saying he was visiting Pariyaram Medical College and was planning to shift back to Kerala. Sathyachandran subsequently handed the script over to Prakash Kumar at Kairali Books.

After some days passed, Sathyachandran called Sreenivasan to follow up. Sreenivasan told him that the story he had narrated over the phone did not translate well into the written script and lacked the same spark. Sreenivasan then asked about his background and how life was going, and told him to send another story if he had one so he could take a look.

Later, in 2007, news broke in film magazines that Sreenivasan was making a film based on the "Barber Balan" story. Since he did not own a mobile phone in 2007, Sathyachandran called Sreenivasan from a phone booth and asked if the film was being made from his script. Sreenivasan replied, "Yes, but since you couldn't come to Madras when I asked, I planned it with others. You can go to Kairali Books and collect some money." However, when Sathyachandran contacted Prakash Kumar at Kairali Books, Prakash said Sreenivasan had never mentioned anything of the sort.

He later contacted Sreenivasan again using a friend's phone. The friend spoke with Sreenivasan for 30 minutes before handing the phone to Sathyachandran, mentioning to Sreenivasan, "this phone has a recording function too." When Sathyachandran spoke, Sreenivasan said that everything was already finalized, nothing could be done, and hung up.

Later, as a diversionary tactic, Sreenivasan allegedly arranged for someone in Thalassery to hold a press conference claiming the story was theirs. At his own press meet, Sreenivasan remarked, "Because the story is good, many people are claiming it is theirs." In another interview with a film magazine, Sreenivasan stated, "A mentally unstable madman from Kozhikode (hinting at Sathyachandran from Koyilandi, Kozhikode) claimed that this is his story. He should be put in a mental hospital."

Sathyachandran filed legal cases for story theft as well as defamation. The defamation case ran for nine years in the Koyilandi court, with a top advocate representing Sreenivasan.

By this time, the film Katha Parayumpol had become a massive hit in Kerala,bigger than ever. Sreenivasan and Mukesh also sold the remake rights for Hindi (Billu Barber, starring Shah Rukh Khan) and Tamil (Kuselan, starring Rajinikanth).

Around then, Sreenivasan and Mukesh announced that they were starting a film institute in Koyilandi, Sathyachandran's hometown. This silenced local reporters and community members from speaking up for Sathyachandran, as they hoped to get opportunities or film roles through the institute. Furthermore, the person who acted as the "film director" in Katha Parayumbol was actually one of the mediators Sathyachandran had originally asked for help,who, after speaking with Sreenivasan, had told Sathyachandran that nothing could be done.

Ultimately, Sathyachandran never received credit or money for his script for Katha Parayumbol, which was later remade into Billu Barber and Kuselan and became pan-Indian blockbusters, despite the fact that all the real-life characters from Poyilkavu and scenes were his, not just a basic story thread. This mirrored what happened to Siddique-Lal with the film Nadodikattu, where Sreenivasan initially took the story and only gave them credit during the film's second run after pressure from director Fazil.

When Sreenivasan appeared on an Amrita TV programme in the later stages of his illness, he was severely affected by paralysis. He was seated in a wheelchair, unable to move much of his body, and his speech had become difficult to understand.During the programme, when others brought up the film Katha Parayumpol and its story, Sreenivasan fell silent and appeared lost in thought. Tears began streaming down his face, and he broke down and cried on stage when the singer who had sung for Katha Parayumpol performed the film's song while praising Sreenivasan as a brilliant screenwriter.

== Awards and honours ==
National Film Awards

- 1998 – Best Film on Other Social Issues – Chinthavishtayaya Shyamala (director)

Kerala State Film Awards

- 1989 – Best Film – Vadakkunokkiyantram (director)
- 1991 – Best Story – Sandhesam
- 1995 – Best Screenplay – Mazhayethum Munpe
- 1998 – Best Popular Film – Chinthavishtayaya Shyamala (director)
- 2006 – Special Mention (Acting) – Thakarachenda
- 2007 – Best Popular Film – Katha Parayumpol (producer)

Kerala Film Critics Association Awards

- 1989 – Best Story – Vadakkunokkiyantram
- 1995 – Best Screenplay – Mazhayethum Munpe
- 1998 – Best Popular Film – Chinthavishtayaya Shyamala (director)
- 2002 – Best Screenplay – Yathrakarude Sradhakku
- 2007 – Best Screenplay – Katha Parayumpol
- 2007 – Special Jury Award
- 2023 – Chalachitra Ratnam Award

Filmfare Awards South

- 1998 – Best Director – Malayalam – Chinthavishtayaya Shyamala
- 2007 – Best Film – Malayalam – Katha Parayumpol (producer)

Asianet Film Awards

- 1998 – Best Director – Chinthavishtayaya Shyamala
- 2005 – Best Script Writer – Udayananu Tharam
- 2007 – Lifetime Achievement Award
- 2007 – Best Film – Katha Parayumpol (producer)
- 2009 – Best Supporting Actor – Makante Achan, Passenger
- 2010 – Special Jury Award – Aathmakatha
- 2018 – Best Script Writer – Njan Prakashan

Ramu Kariat Memorial Awards

- 1998 – Best Film – Chinthavishtayaya Shyamala
- 2010 – Best Actor – Aathmakatha

Other Awards

- 2008 – Best Script Writer – Katha Parayumpol
- 2009 – Sathyan Memorial Film Award for his outstanding contributions to Malayalam cinema.
- 2011 – Golden Friends of Kannur Expatriates Award
- 2011 – T. K. Ramakrishnan Memorial Award for exemplary contribution to public life.
- 2012 – Bharat Balan K. Nair Film Award for his outstanding contributions to Malayalam cinema.
- 2024 – Tapasya Madampu Smriti Award for contributions to Malayalam film literature.
