= Mohan Sithara =

Indian music composer

- Born: 30 May 1959 (age 67); Peruvallur, Thrissur, Kerala, India
- Occupation: Music director
- Instruments: Violin; Harmonium
- Years active: 1986–present
- Spouse: Baby (m. 1986)
- Website: mohansithara.com

Mohan Sithara (born 30 May 1959) is an Indian music composer. He started his musical career in cinema by composing the songs of Malayalam film Onnu Muthal Poojyam Vare. He received the Kerala State Film Award for the Best Music Director (2009) for the songs in Priyanandan's Soofi Paranja Kadha. Since 1986 he has been an active musician in the Malayalam film industry. His work mixes Western, Classical and folk styles. He has worked with lyricists and poets like O. N. V Kurup, V. Madhusoodanan Nair, Yusufali Kechery, Sreekumaran Thampi, Rajeev Alunkal, Kaithapram Damodaran Namboothiri, S. Ramesan Nair, Vinayan, Bharanikkavu Sivakumar, Anil Panachooran, Vayalar Sarath Chandra Varma, Gireesh Puthenchery, and Bichu Thirumala. Many prominent singers have sung his songs, including K. J. Yesudas, P. Jayachandran, M. G. Sreekumar, K. S. Chithra, Sujatha Mohan, Madhu Balakrishnan, G. Venugopal, Shreya Ghoshal, Vidhu Prathap, Afsal, Manjari, Jyotsna Radhakrishnan and Biju Narayanan.

== Early life ==
Mohan Sithara was born on 30 May 1959 in Peruvallur village in the Thrissur district of Kerala. He started his music career as violinist in some music troupes, one of which was Sithara troupe (from which he took the name Mohan Sithara). Later he worked with various music composers including M. G. Radhakrishnan, Shyam, and Perumbavoor G. Raveendranath. He did orchestration for the film Thoovanathumbikal with Perumbavoor G. Raveendranath, which led to several hit songs. His first work as independent music director in the Malayalam film industry was the film Onnu Muthal Poojyam Vare (From One to Zero), for which he composed the song "Raree Rareeram Raro" (it was also the first song for G. Venugopal).

== Filmography ==
1984

. Kaliyil Alpam Karyam (Background Music)

1986

- Onnu Muthal Poojyam Vare

1987

- Varshangal Poyathariyathe
- Mizhiyithalil Kanneerumaayi
- Achuvettante Veedu (Background Music)

1988

- Kudumbapuranam
- Aalilakkuruvikal
- Maamalakalkkappurath
- Deerghasumangalee Bhava

1989

- Devadas
- Mudra
- Eenam Maranna Kaattu
- Njaattuvela
- Innale (Background Score)
- Chanakyan

1990

- Vachanam
- Parampara
- His Highness Abdullah (Background Music)
- Marupuram
- Maalayogam
- Ammayude swantham Kunjumeri
- Manju peyyunna Raathri

1991

- Santhwanam
- Mukha Chithram
- Georgekutty C/O Georgekutty
- Aviraamam
- Holiday

1992

- Utsavamelam
- Mukhamudra
- Ponnaramthottathe Raajaavu
- Ayalathe Adheham (Background score)
- Ente ponnu thamburaan (Background score)
- Kallan Kappalil Thanne
- Sathyaprathijna
- Avarude Sanketham
- First Bell
- Kunjikuruvi
- Ormakkurippukal

1993

- Aalavattam
- Kulapathi
- Kaavadiyaattam
- Aparna
- Porutham
- Ponnuchaami
- Vakkeel Vasudev
- Johny
- Oru Kadamkadha Pole
- Ottayadippaathakal
- Kilivaathil (Mrinaalam)

1994

- Varaphalam
- Chanakya Soothrangal
- Chief Minister K.R. Gowthami
- Daivathinte Vikrithikal
- Avan Ananthapadmanabhan
- Orkathirunnappol

1995

- Special Squad
- Munpe Parakkunna Pakshi
- Maanthrikante Praavukal
- Poovukalku Punyakaalam

1996

- Kaliveedu
- Excuse Me Ethu Collegila?
- Saare Jahaan Se Achcha

1997

- Snehadooth
- Kalyana Unnikal
- Kottappurathe Koottukudumbam
- Ishtadanam
- Arjunan Pillayum Anchu Makkalum
- Kadhaanaayakan
- Mayaponman

1998

- Manthri Kochamma
- Manthrikumaran
- Nakshathrathaaraattu
- Harthaal

1999

- Varum Varaathirikkilla
- Deepasthambham Mahaashcharyam
- Vasanthiyum Lakshmiyum Pinne Njaanum
- Mazhavillu

2000

- Joker
- Dada Sahib
- Varnakkazhchakal
- Valliettan
- Sahayaathrikaykku Snehapoorvam

2001

- Nalacharitham Naalam Divasam
- Ishtam
- Karumaadikuttan
- Unnathangalil
- Sundara Purushan
- Vakkaalathu Naaraayanankutti
- Raakshasa Rajavu
- Sharjah To Sharjah
- Nakshathrangal Parayaathirunnathu
- Chethaaram

2002

- Oomapenninu Uriyadappayyan
- Kunjikoonan
- Pranayamanithooval
- Kaattuchembakam
- Basketball
- Snehithan
- Nammal
- Kuberan

2003

- Swapnakkoodu
- War And Love
- Pattanathil Sundaran
- Anyar
- Sadanandante Samayam
- Mr. Brahmachari
- Singaari Bolona
- Meerayude Dukhavum Muthuvinte Swapnavum
- Choonda
- Zameendaar

2004

- Kazhcha
- Koottu
- Udayam

2005

- Thanmathra
- Hridayathil Sookshikkaan
- Raappakal

2006

- The Don
- Kali
- Karutha Pakshikal
- Palunku

2007

- Anchil Oral Arjunan
- Payum Puli
- Nanma
- Nagaram
- Aakaasham

2008

- Swarnam
- Shakespeare M.A. Malayalam

2009

- Aayirathil Oruvan
- Pathaam Adhyaayam
- Bhagavan
- Dalamarmarangal
- Bhramaram
- Malayaali
- Sufi Paranja Katha
- Ividam Swargamaanu
- Mithram (Not released yet)
- Currency (Background Score)

2010

- Yugapurushan
- Nallavan
- Advocate Lakshmanan - Ladies Only
- Inganeyum Oral
- Oridathoru Postman
- Kayam

2011

- Ithu Nammude Katha
- Yaathra Thudarunnu
- Shankaranum Mohananum
- Kanakompathu
- Ulakam Chuttum Valiban
- Pachuvum Kovalanum
- Vellaripravinte Changathi

2012

- Last Bench
- Aazhakkadal
- Naadabrahmam
- Ezham Suryan
- Mullamottum Munthirichaarum
- Bhoopadathil Illatha Oridam

2013

- Ayaal
- Breaking News Live

2014

- My Dear Mummy
- To Noora with Love
- Color Balloon
- Little Superman 3D

2015

- Life Full of Life

2016

- Sukhamaayirikkatte
- Mud Maza

2017

- Mazha Ariyathe

2018

- Karinkannan
- Sukhamano Daveede

2022

- Oru Pakka Naadan Premam

2023

- Asthra
- Alinta

2024

- Ezhuthola

2025

- Randaam Yaamam
- Daivathaan Kunnu

== Highlight songs ==
- Pranayakatha (Deepasthambham Mahascharyam)
- Uchalu Tirumalava (Mamalakalkkappurath)
- Raree rareeram raro (Onnu Muthal Poojyam Varae)
- Neermizhippeeliyil
- Ila Kozhiyum sisirathil
- Sahyasaanu sruthi
- Pathinezhinte Poomkaralin (Vellaripraavinte Changaathi)
- Pranathosmi
- Mullapoovin muthe
- Enthe nin pinakkam
- Kananakuyilinu kathilidanoru
- Hrudaya Mrudanga
- Pramadavaniyil veendum
- Krishna née en krishnamanee
- Unnee vavao ponnunnee
- Swarakanyakamar
- Mindathedi kuyile (Thanmaathra)
- Thekkini kolaya chumaril (Sufi Paranja Katha)
- Ithaloornu veena (Thanmaathra)
- Mele vellithinkal (Thanmaathra)
- Annarakkanna vaa (Bhramaram)
- Kaattru veliyedi kannamma (Thanmaathra)
- Pokathe kariyilakkatte (Loudspeaker)
- Shivadam shivanamam (Mazhavillu)
- Dhwani tharanga tharalam
- Kanneer mazhayathu (Joker)
- En ammae onnu kaanaan (Nammal)
- Pon kasavu njoriyum
- Moonnaam thrukkannil
- Indraneelam choodi agraharam thedi
- Kukku kukku kuyile
- Oru mathavumanyamalla
- Kodi kodi adimakal
- Thekko Thekkorikkal (Vellaripraavinte Changaathi)
- Kaanumbol parayamo (Ishtam)
- Chanchala dhruda pada thaalam (Ishtam)
- Swapnam thyajichal swargam labhikkum (Raakshasaraajaavu)
- Chandanathennalay njan ninte lolamaam
- Ponnavani vettam thirumuttam
- Chembarundin chelunde
- Kunjurangum koottinullil
- Swarajathi paadum pynkilee
- Irulin Mahanidrayil ninnunarthi nee
- Sukhamanee nilaavu (Nammal)
- Oru mazhappakshi paadunnu
- Manimukilae nee
- Kannivasantham kaattil moolum
- Inayarayannam kulichu keri
- Agadha neela samudrachuzhikalil
- Thanka manassu amma manassu (Raappakal)
- Kallyana prayamaanu
- Ilam manju mulam
- Manassu oru manthrikakkoodu
- Deepankuram poothorungumaakaasam
- Kettu tharaattinte thaalam
- Dhanumasappenninu poothaalam
- Enikkum oru naavundenkil
- Kadanja chandanamo nin meni
- Prema madhu thedum
- Makara nilavil madhuravumaayi
- Karimizhiyaale oru kadha parayaam njaan
- Marakkaam ellam marakkam (Swapnakkoodu)
- Malarkili inayude (Swapnakkoodu)
- Pedi thonni aadyam kandappol
- Kannanaayaal Raadha venam (Pattanatthil Sundaran)
- Pukkikkuyile kallikkuyile (Anyar)
- Neeyarinnjo neelakkuzhali (Sadaanandante Samayam)
- Omalale ente manassin
- Tharivala kayyalenne (Sadaanandante Samayam)
- Kaananakkuyilinu
- Kuyile nin kurumkuzhalil
- Kannuneer puzhayude theerathu (Meerayude Dukkhavum Muthuvinte Swapnavum)
- Thaamarakkanna
- Kuttanadan kayalile (Kaazhcha)
- Kalabhakkuri charthende
- Jugnu re Jugnu re (Kaazhcha)
- Aalmaram chaayum neram
- Ammaanam chemmaanam
- Meda ponveyiloothiyurukki
- Neeyente paattil sreeragamayi
- Sindoora sandhye parayoo
- Snehathin poo nulli
- Aalilakkanna
- Chanthu pottum chenkelassum
- Kilivaathilil kaathorthu njan
- Ponnolathumbi
- Ravin nilakaayal
- Mazhayil rathri mazhayil (Karuttha Pakshikal)
- Puthumazhayay pozhiyam
- Manassee saanthamakoo
- Thalolam thane thaaraattum
- Vala nalla kuppi vala vangitharum
- Manithaliyay ee manam thelinju
- Kunkuma malarukalo virinju
- Kaattu thulli kayalolam
- Niranazhi Ponnin (Valyettan)
- Ninte kannil virunnuvannu
- Annarakkanna vaa
- Vaa vaa thaamarappenne

== Awards ==
Kerala Film Critics Association Awards

- 1989 – Best Music Director - Mudra, Chanakyan
- 1992 – Best Background Score - Daivathinte Vikruthikal
- 1996 – Best Background Score - Desadanam

Mathrubhumi Medimix Film Awards

- 1999 – Best Music Director - Vasantiyum Lakshmiyum Pinne Njanum, Deepasthambham Mahascharyam

Filmfare Awards South

- 2000 – Best Music Director – Malayalam - Joker

AVT Grihalakshmi TV Awards

- 2006 – Best Music Director - Minnukettu (Tele serial)

Kerala State Film Awards

- 2009 – Best Music Director - Sufi Paranja Katha

Annual Malayalam Movie Awards, UAE

- 2009 – Best Background Score - Bhramaram

Other awards

- 2009 – Raveendra Puraskaram by Raveendran Music Foundation
- 2013 - M. S. Baburaj Memorial Award by All Kerala Mappila Sangeetha Academy Awards

== Personal life ==
He is married to Baby in 1986 and has two children. His elder child, Mubina, sang a few songs directed by him and now she is married. His son, Avin (Vishnu), is a music programmer. Vishnu has already composed a few albums and has been assisting senior composers in orchestration.
