= Ullasapoongattu =

- DVD cover
- Directed by: Vinayan
- Written by: J. Pallassery
- Produced by: Jolly Xavier
- Starring: Dileep; Mohini; Kalabhavan Mani; Thilakan; Jagathy Sreekumar
- Cinematography: Dinesh Babu
- Edited by: G. Murali
- Music by: Berny-Ignatius (songs), S.P. Venkidesh (background score)
- Production company: Bhagya Productions
- Distributed by: A Victory Movies
- Release date: 25 February 1997
- Country: India
- Language: Malayalam

Ullasapoongattu (transl. Upbeat flowery wind) is a 1997 Indian Malayalam-language romantic comedy thriller film directed by Vinayan, and starring Dileep, Mohini, Kalabhavan Mani, Thilakan and Jagathy Sreekumar in major roles. Tini Tom sang a song in this film for Thilakan.

== Cast ==
- Dileep as Unni
- Mohini as Maya
- Kalabhavan Mani as Musthafa
- Thilakan as John Fernandez
- Jagathy Sreekumar as Vasu / Vasuvannan
- Meghanathan as Kaliyappan
- Maniyanpilla Raju as Kuriyachan
- Kalpana as Marykkutty, Kuriachan's Wife
- N. Sabnam as Kamakshi
- Oduvil Unnikrishnan as Thirumeni
- Usha as Maya's Sister
- Darshana as Maina
- M. Renjith as Police Officer
