= Azhagesan =

- DVD cover
- Directed by: Arthi Kumar
- Screenplay by: Arthi Kumar
- Story by: Vinayan
- Produced by: B. Avinash; C. Inayathullah
- Starring: Sathyaraj; Prema
- Cinematography: D. Shankar
- Edited by: V. M. Uthayasankar
- Music by: Deva
- Production company: Grace Movie Makers
- Release date: 20 August 2004
- Running time: 130 minutes
- Country: India
- Language: Tamil

Azhagesan is a 2004 Indian Tamil-language drama film directed by Arthi Kumar. The film stars Sathyaraj and Prema. The film, produced by B. Avinash and C. Inayathullah, was released on 20 August 2004. It is a remake of the 2001 Malayalam film Karumadikkuttan. The film was released with no publicity as the makers had been depleted of money after the film went through development hell.

== Plot ==
Azhagesan, a mentally ill man, is in love with his cousin Nandini, a college student. Neelakandan is the village landlord who is a cunning man who grabbed all the wealth from Nandini's father a few years back. Neelakandan has a son Sekhar, who is a womanizer.

Nandini and her college professor fall in love, he proposes to marry her, and she accepts. Sekhar, who has an eye on Nandini, is humiliated and slapped by Nandini while he tries to misbehave with her. As a means of revenge, Sekhar kicks Nandini and her grandmother out of their house. Nandini's marriage is immediately stopped, and her grandmother falls ill.

Azhagesan accommodates them in his small house. Later, Nandini's fall seriously ill, and Nandini is raped by Sekhar in exchange for getting her grandmother to the town hospital. But the grandmother dies on the way to the hospital, and Nandini is devastated. Nandini gets pregnant but aborts with Neelakandan's daughter's support. Neelakandan wants to take Nandini to his house and marry Sekhar, but she refuses, and Azhagesan humiliates Neelakandan. Sekhar decides to kill Azhagesan. First, he kills Azhagesan's family friend Govinda. In the meantime, Neelakandan dies because of his illness. Sekhar's henchmen beat Azhagesan, and Nandini kills Sekhar. A few years later, Nandini is released from jail and lives happily with Azhagesan.

== Cast ==
- Sathyaraj as Azhagesan
- Prema as Nandini
- Manoj K. Jayan as Sekhar
- Pithamagan Mahadevan as Neelakandan
- Manorama as Parvathy Nandini's grandmother
- Delhi Ganesh as Govinda
- Vinu Chakravarthy
- Chithra Lakshmanan
- L. M. M. Swaminathan
- Halwa Vasu
- Kalpana Shree as Sumathi, Neelakandan's daughter

== Production ==
After a stint of shooting at AVM Studios, the unit moved on to locations in Ooty, Conoor, Kothagiri, Singara Estate and Vandicholai among other places.

== Soundtrack ==
The film score and the soundtrack were composed by Deva.

| Song | Singer(s) | Lyrics | Duration |
|---|---|---|---|
| "Jintha Jinakku Jintha" | Srinivas, Padmalatha | Kalaikumar | 4:31 |
| "Kala Kalavena" (Solo) | Vijay Yesudas | Kalaikumar | 4:40 |
| "Kala Kalavena" (Duet) | Krishnaraj, Padmalatha | Kalaikumar | 4:39 |
| "Nee Kidaicha" | Vijay Yesudas | Kalaikumar | 4:11 |
| "Vaada Thambi" | Deva | Kalidasan | 4:05 |

== Reception ==
Malini Mannath of Chennai Online wrote "The backdrop to the story is the lush ambience of a hillstation. But apart from the lushness of its ambience, there's very little going for the film. It's a role Satyaraj should have done earlier in his career, his performance very affected here". Sify called it "an amateurish attempt and is strictly avoidable".
