= Karthika Mathew =

Indian actress

- Born: Kerala, India
- Other name: 'Nam Nadu' Karthika
- Occupations: Actress, model
- Years active: 2002–2015

Karthika Mathew (born Lidiya Jacob), better known mononymously as Karthika, is an Indian former actress, who has appeared in several Malayalam and Tamil films.

== Filmography ==
Year	Film	Role	Language	Notes
2001	Kasi	Sales girl	Tamil	Cameo
2002	Oomappenninu Uriyadappayyan	Annie	Malayalam	
2002	Kattuchembakam	Chandru's sister	Malayalam	
2002	Meesa Madhavan	Malathi	Malayalam	
2002	Krishna Pakshakkilikal	Usha	Malayalam	
2002	En Mana Vaanil	Sumathi	Tamil	
2003	Pulival Kalyanam	Sreekutti	Malayalam	
2003	Melvilasam Sariyanu	Geethu	Malayalam	
2003	Malsaram	Susie	Malayalam	
2003	Anyar	Meghna	Malayalam	
2004	Vellinakshatram	Aswathi Thampuratti/Princess	Malayalam	
2004	Aparichithan	Simi	Malayalam	
2004	Njan Salperu Ramankutty	Seema	Malayalam	
2005	Five Fingers	Meera	Malayalam	
2005	Iruvattam Manavatti		Malayalam	
2006	Bada Dosth	Nadhira	Malayalam	
2006	Lion	Meenakshi	Malayalam	
2006	Achante Ponnumakkal	Manikutty	Malayalam	
2006	Kanaka Simhasanam	Marthandom Bharathi	Malayalam	
2007	Athisayan	Anita Williams	Malayalam	
2007	Black Cat	Blessy	Malayalam	
2007	Janmam	Valli Devaraayar	Malayalam	
2007	Nam Naadu	Gowri	Tamil	
2008	Aayudham	Seena	Malayalam	
2008	Shambu	Meera	Malayalam	
2008	Twenty:20	Alice	Malayalam	
2008	Dindigul Sarathy	Vasanthi	Tamil	
2009	Naalai Namadhe	Priya Alexander	Tamil	
2009	Aarumaname	Kadambari	Tamil	
2009	Palaivana Solai	Priya	Tamil	
2010	Magizhchi	Nagammai	Tamil	
2010	Kausthubham	Yamuna	Malayalam	
2011	Nootrukku Nooru	Manjula	Tamil	
2015	Pulan Visaranai 2	Samyuktha	Tamil	
