= Rakshasa Rajavu =

2001 Malayalam film directed by Vinayan

- Poster
- Directed by: Vinayan
- Written by: Vinayan
- Produced by: Sargam Kabeer
- Starring: Mammootty; Dileep; Meena; Kalabhavan Mani; Vijayakumar; Kavya Madhavan
- Cinematography: Sanjeev Shankar
- Edited by: G. Murali
- Music by: Rajamani (score); Mohan Sithara (songs)
- Distributed by: Sargam Films
- Release date: 31 August 2001
- Running time: 165 minutes
- Country: India
- Language: Malayalam

Rakshasa Rajavu (transl. Demon king) is a 2001 Indian Malayalam-language action crime film written and directed by Vinayan and starring Mammootty in the lead role along with Dileep, Meena, Kalabhavan Mani, Kavya Madhavan, Vijayakumar, Rajan P. Dev, Cochin Haneefa, and Sukumari. The film was released on 31 August 2001 and was subsequently dubbed in Telugu and Tamil as Commissioner Rudrama Naidu and Commissioner Eeswara Paandiyan. The film received an A certificate for use of extreme violence and gore.

== Plot ==
Ramanathan is a city police commissioner who takes the law into his own hands after his wife is murdered and he receives no support from those he approaches. He is assisted by his subordinate SP Gopakumar, who admires his honesty and integrity. Although Ramanathan accepts bribes, he uses them to bring wrongdoers to justice, following the example of Kayamkulam Kochunni, a renowned real-life robber who took from the rich and gave to the poor. He also funds an orphanage for mentally disabled children.

Appu is in love with Daisy, the daughter of wealthy politician Attuva Antony. When Antony learns of their relationship, he confines Daisy to the house, but Appu continues to meet her secretly. One day, Daisy's entire family is murdered during a burglary. Daisy survives but falls into a coma, while Appu is accused of the killings and arrested. Ramanathan sets out to prove Appu's innocence, ultimately exposing the person responsible for murdering Daisy's family for money and power.

== Cast ==
- Mammootty as DIG T.Ramanathan IPS, City Police Commissioner
- Dileep as Appu
- Kalabhavan Mani as Excise / Education Minister Gunasekharan
- Meena as Meera, Chief Minister's daughter and Ramanathan's love interest
- Kavya Madhavan as Daisy Antony, Appu's love interest
- Manya as Malathi, Ramanathan's younger sister
- Suchithra Murali as Maya, Ramanathan's deceased wife (Cameo)
- Vijayakumar as SP Gopakumar IPS
- Harisree Ashokan as Constable Pathrose
- Rajan P. Dev as Finance Minister Attuva Avarachan, Antony's elder brother
- Sai Kumar as ADGP Gomez Alexander IPS
- Captain Raju as DGP S. S. Pillai IPS, State Police Chief
- Janardhanan as Chief Minister, Meera's father
- Cochin Haneefa as Attuva Antony / Antonichan, Daisy's father
- Suresh Krishna as Mohammed Ibrahim (Voiceover by Sai Kumar)
- Indrans as Kochukuttan, Appu's friend
- Sukumari as Kashi Muthashi, Appu's grandmother
- Sadiq as CI Rajan
- Spadikam George as DYSP Siddharthan
- Shivaji as Dr. Issac, Ramanathan's friend
- Machan Varghese as Poulose, Avarachan's PA
- T. P. Madhavan as Ponnachan's younger brother
- Manka Mahesh as Mary Antony / Maryamma, Daisy's mother
- Joemon Joshy as Thommikunju Antony, Daisy's younger brother
- Priyanka Anoop as Kalyani, Antony's house servant
- Devi Chandana as Doctor Radha, Meera's friend
- Meenakshi Sunil as Annie Antony, Daisy's elder sister
- Baburaj as Gomez Alexander's Henchman
- Joju George as Gunashekharan's Henchman
- Narayanankutty as Sub Inspector of Police
- J. Pallassery as Action Councillor T. P. Narayanan
- Babu Swamy as Intelligence I. G. Goswamy
- Ambika Mohan as Sebastian's wife
- Deepika Mohan as Party Member

== Release ==
The film was released on 31 August 2001. It was the second release of director Vinayan in year 2001 after Karumadikkuttan which was released in April 2001.

== Box office ==
The film was a megahit and ran for over 100 days in theatres.

== Soundtrack ==
All lyrics are written by S. Ramesan Nair; all music is composed by Mohan Sithara.

No.	Title	Artist(s)	Length
1.	"Ethal Mizhikal"	Sreeram, Smitha
2.	"Indhumathi"	Smitha
3.	"Kannare Kannare"	K. S. Chithra, M. G. Sreekumar
4.	"Marikkattu Veessi Veessi"	Aneesh
5.	"Palinu Madhuram"	K. J. Yesudas
6.	"Sarathkala Mukile"	M. G. Sreekumar
7.	"Swapanam Theyajichal"	K. J. Yesudas
8.	"Swapanam Theyajichal"	K. S. Chithra, K. J. Yesudas, Aswathy Vijayan
