= Kavya Madhavan =

Indian actress (born 1984)

- Kavya in 2013
- Born: 19 September 1984 (age 42); Nileshwaram, Kasaragod, Kerala, India
- Occupations: Film actress; classical dancer; singer; lyricist
- Years active: 1991–2016
- Organization: Laksyah
- Notable work: Full list
- Spouses: Nishal Chandra (m. 2009; div. 2011); Dileep (m. 2016)
- Children: 1
- Awards: Full list

Kavya Madhavan (born 19 September 1984), is a former Indian actress who acted predominantly in Malayalam films, and a few Tamil films. She made her debut in 1991 as a child artist in Pookkalam Varavayi. Her debut role as one of the lead actresses (the other being Samyuktha Varma) was in Lal Jose's Chandranudikkunna Dikkil in 1999, when she was in the ninth grade. Its success established her status as one of the leading actress in the Malayalam industry during the 2000s. She has since acted in over 75 films. She has won the Kerala State Film Award for Best Actress twice, for her performances in Perumazhakkalam (2004) and Khaddama (2010).

== Early life ==
Kavya Madhavan was born on 19 September 1984 into a Chaliya Hindu family to P. Madhavan and Shyamala in Nileshwaram, Kasaragod, India. She has a brother Midhun Madhavan, who is a fashion designer. She completed her schooling at Rajah's Higher Secondary School in Nileshwaram. She began learning classical dance whilst at school and participated in various dance competitions.

== Personal life ==
Kavya married Nishal Chandra on 9 February 2009, after which she moved to Kuwait. However, she returned home in June the same year and filed for divorce on 24 July 2009. Both Kavya and Nishal appeared before the court on 25 May 2011 and expressed their willingness for a mutual divorce. The divorce was granted on 30 May 2011. She married actor Dileep in spite of infidelity rumours, on 25 November 2016 at Vedanta Hotel, Kochi. The couple have a daughter, Mahalakshmi, born on 19 October 2018.

Kavya owns a textile shop named Laksyah. In April 2013, Mathrubhumi Books published a collection of memoirs written by Kavya, titled Kathayil Alpam Kavyam which gives a glimpse into her childhood memories and the experiences of her school days and in the film industry. The book was released by writers Subhash Chandran and Deedi Damodaran at a function held in K. P. Kesava Menon Hall in Kozhikode on 11 April.

== Acting career ==
Kavya first appeared as a child artist in Kamal's film Pookkalam Varavayi (1991) at the age of six in a cameo role along the students in a bus. Subsequently, she was offered parts in other projects such as Pavam IA Ivachan (1994), Parassala Pachan Payyannur Paramu (1994) by P. Venu and Azhakiya Ravanan (1996), directed by Kamal. She was offered one of the female lead in Chandranudikkunna Dikkil, also starring Dileep, in 1999. After the success of Chandranudikkunna Dikhil, Kavya and Dileep became a popular pairing in Malayalam cinema, and they worked together in 21 movies. Some of their movies are Thenkasipattanam (2000), Darling Darling (2000), Dhosth (2001), Meesa Madhavan (2002) which was one of biggest grosser of the year and was directed by Lal Jose, Mizhi Randilum (2003) in which she played a double role, Sadanandante Samayam (2003), Thilakkam (2003) directed by Jayaraj, Runway (2004) directed by Joshiy, Kochi Rajavu (2005), Lion (2006) again directed by Joshiy, Chakkaramuthu (2006), Inspector Garud (2007), Paappi Appacha (2010), Vellaripravinte Changathi (2011) and Pinneyum (2016). Most of their movies were in the romantic comedy genre.

She also acted in films with Mammootty and Mohanlal, and in movies with several stars, such as Ee Pattanathil Bhootham, Christian Brothers and China Town.

She got critical acclaim for her performance in Perumazhakkalam for which she won 2004 Kerala State Film Award for Best Actress and for the role of Ashwati in Khaddama where she played a housemaid working in Saudi Arabia. The movie was based on a feature by K. U. Iqbal, published in Bhashaposhini. The movie was directed by her mentor Kamal, and she got her second Kerala State Film Award for Best Actress for 2011. She won the 2011 Kerala Film Critics Awards for Best Actress, Amrita-FEFKA Film Awards for Best Actress, Best Actress-Malayalam cinema in 59th Filmfare Awards South and Best Actress in Thikkurissy Foundation Awards. She was part of big grossers like Christian Brothers and China Town in 2011 and was selected as Top Star (Female) 2011 in Malayalam.

She was cast in Adoor Gopalakrishnan's Naalu Pennungal in which she played a supporting role.

Though she had many offers from Tamil cinema, she was very reluctant to act due to her busy schedule in Malayalam. Her first was Kasi (2001) which was the remake of Vinayans Vasanthiyum Lakshmiyum Pinne Njaanum. She went on to act in En Mana Vaanil and Sadhu Miranda and enjoyed moderate success.

She wrote lyrics for the song "En Khalbillulloru Pennaanu" for the film One Way Ticket (2008) and for Akashavani (2016). She sang her first movie song for the Malayalam film Matinee (2012). She has appeared in many advertisements, TV shows, short films and stage shows. She also sang songs for the movies Hadiya (2017) and Daivame Kaithozham K. Kumar Akanam (2018).

From acting as a child to acting as an actress, Sreeja has provided voice to her in many films. Devi, Praveena, Bhagyalakshmi and Vimmy Mariam George and Nithuna Nevil Dinesh have also lent their voices in some films.

== Filmography ==
Year	Film	Role	Notes
1991	Pookkalam Varavayi	Geethu's friend	Child artist
1992	Mayilppeeli		
1994	Pavam I. A. Ivachan	Sara Ivachan	
1994	The President		
1996	Parassala Pachan Payyannur Paramu	Neena	
1996	Azhakiya Ravanan	Young Anuradha	
1997	Oral Mathram	Gopika Menon	
1997	Snehasindooram	Anjali	
1997	Bhoothakkannadi	Meenu	
1997	Irattakuttikalude Achan	Dhanya	
1997	Krishnagudiyil Oru Pranayakalathu	Anjali	
1998	Kattathoru Penpoovu	Yamuna	Supporting Actress
1999	Chandranudikkunna Dikhil	Radha	Debut film in a leading role
2000	Kochu Kochu Santhoshangal	Celin	
2000	Sahayathrikakku Snehapoorvam	Maya	
2000	Madhuranombarakattu	Sunaina	
2000	Darling Darling	Padmaja/Puppy	
2000	Thenkasipattanam	Devu	
2001	Jeevan Masai	Manjula	
2001	Mazhamegha Pravukal	Malu	
2001	Dosth	Geethu	
2001	Rakshasa Rajavu	Daisy	
2001	Kasi	Lakshmi	Tamil film
2002	Oomappenninu Uriyadappayyan	Gopika Rajashekhara Varma	
2002	Onnaman	Suhara	
2002	Meesa Madhavan	Rugmini	
2002	En Mana Vaanil	Thilaka	Tamil film; remake of Oomappenninu Uriyadappayyan
2003	Thilakkam	Ammu	
2003	Sadanandante Samayam	Sumangala	
2003	Vellithira	Pankajam	Cameo appearance
2003	Mizhi Randilum	Bhadra and Bhama	Dual role
2003	Gowrisankaram	Gauri	
2003	Pulival Kalyanam	Ganga	
2004	Runway	Gopika	
2004	Greetings	Sheethal	
2004	Perumazhakkalam	Ganga	
2005	Iruvattam Manavaatti	Bhumika	
2005	Annorikkal	Ponnu	
2005	Kochi Rajavu	Ashwathy/Achu	
2005	Aparichithan	Meenakshi	
2005	Kadha	Meera	
2005	Ananthabhadram	Bhadra	
2005	Seelabathi	Seelabathi	
2006	Lion	Sharika	
2006	Kilukkam Kilukilukkam	Chandini	
2006	Vadakkumnadhan	Bhama	
2006	Classmates	Thara Kurup	
2006	Vasthavam	Sumithra	
2006	Chakkara Muthu	Anitha	
2006	Arunam	Valli	
2007	Inspector Garud	Subcollector.Sethulakshmi	
2007	Athisayan	Maya	
2007	Nadiya Kollappetta Rathri	Nadiya and Nadira	Dual role
2007	Naalu Pennungal	Subhadra	
2007	Kangaroo	Jancy	
2008	Sadhu Miranda	Priya	Tamil film
2008	Madampi	Jayalakshmi	
2008	Twenty:20	Ancy	
2009	Banaras	Amritha	
2009	Ee Pattanathil Bhootham	Ancy	
2010	Paappi Appacha	Annie	
2011	Gaddama	Aswathy	
2011	Christian Brothers	Meenakshi	
2011	Chinatown	Rosamma	
2011	Bhaktha Janangalude Sradhakku	Sumangala	
2011	Venicile Vyaapari	Ammu	
2011	Vellaripravinte Changathi	Sulekha / Mary Varghese	
2012	Bavuttiyude Namathil	Vanaja	
2013	Players (film)	Rose	Delayed Release Shot in 2007
2013	Lokpal	Dr.Geetha	
2013	Breaking News Live	Nayana	
2013	5 Sundarikal	Gauri	Anthology film; Segment: Gauri
2015	She Taxi	Sharika	
2016	Aakashvani	Vani	Also lyricist for the song "Kaalam Ni"
2016	Pinneyum	Devi	

== Short films ==
Year	Film	Role	Notes
2006	Bhoomikkoru Charamageetham	College student	Short film
2016	Kaavalal	Herself	Short film

== Awards and nominations ==
Kavya Madhavan awards and nominations
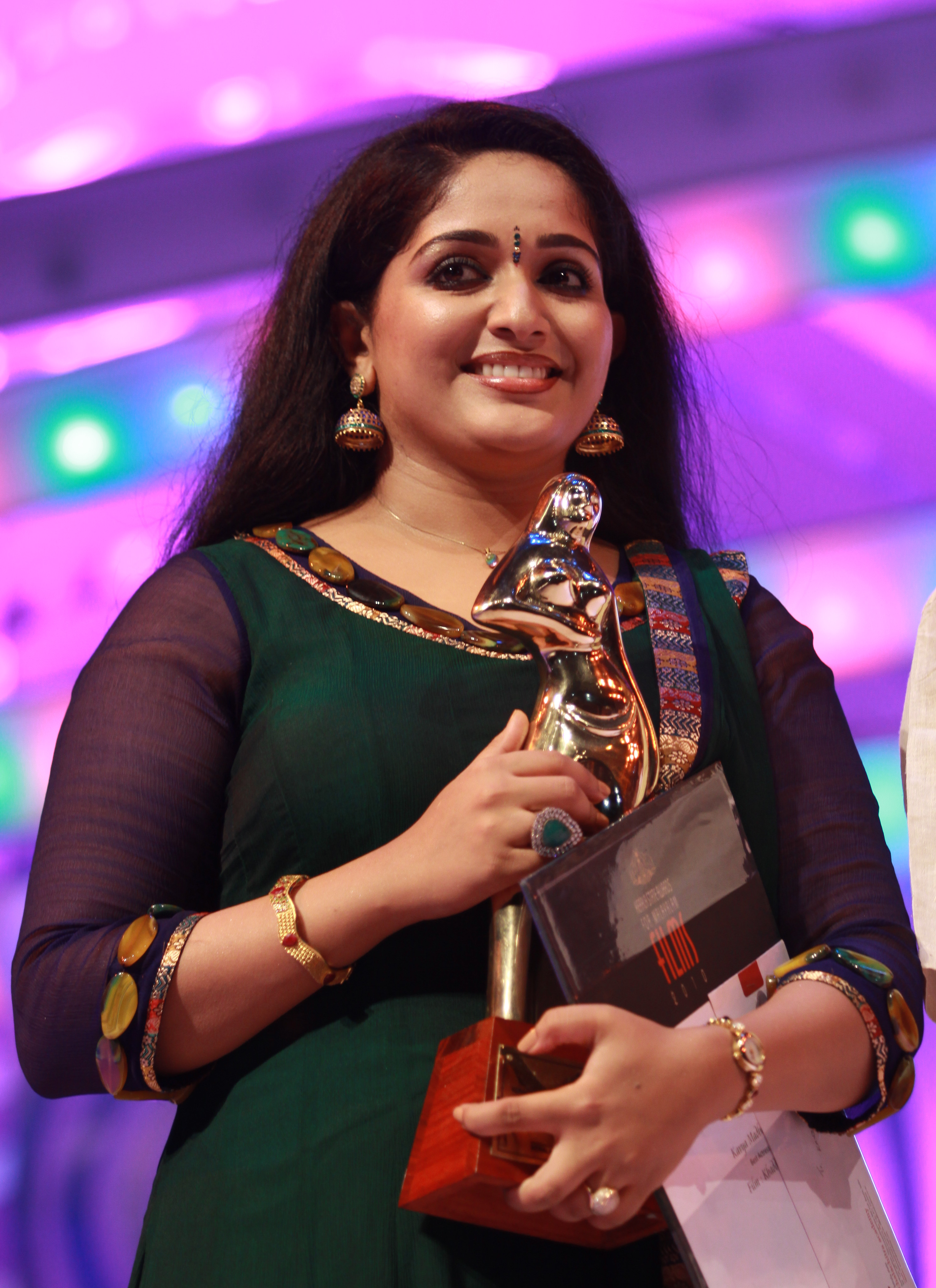
Awards and nominations
Award	Wins	Nominations

Totals (Note: Certain award groups do not simply award one winner. They acknowledge several different recipients, have runners-up, and have third place. Since this is a specific recognition and is different from losing an award, runner-up mentions are considered wins in this award tally. For simplification and to avoid errors, each award in this list has been presumed to have had a prior nomination.)
- Wins: 26
- Nominations: 21

Year	Award	Award category & awarded work	Ref.
2004	Kerala State Film Awards	Best Actress – Perumazhakkalam	
2011	Kerala State Film Awards	Best Actress – Gaddama	
2011	Filmfare Awards South	Best Actress (Malayalam) – Gaddama	
2013	Asiavision Awards	Best Actress	
2000; 2001; 2003	Kerala Film Critics Awards	Second Best Actress – Chandranudikkunna Dikhil; Second Best Actress – Kochu Kochu Santhoshangal; Second Best Actress – Mizhi Randilum	
2004; 2005; 2010	Kerala Film Critics Awards	Best Actress – Perumazhakkalam & Annorikkal; Best Actress – Anandabhadram; Best Actress – Gaddama	
2011	South Indian International Movie Awards	Best Actress – Gaddama	
2013	South Indian International Movie Awards	Special Appreciation Award for her contribution to Malayalam Cinema	
2000; 2002; 2004; 2009; 2011; 2012	Asianet Film Awards	Special Jury Award – Kochu Kochu Santhoshangal, Madhuranombarakattu; Best Star Pair – Meesa Madhavan; Best Actress – Oomappenninu Uriyadappayyan; Special Jury Award – Perumazhakkalam; Best Actress – Banaras; Best Actress – Gaddama, Bhaktha Janangalude Sradhakku; Best Actress – Bavuttiyude Namathil	
2004; 2006; 2011	Vanitha Film Awards	Best Actress – Mizhi Randilum; Best Actress – Anandabhadram; Best Actress – Gaddama	
2011	Sathyan Awards; Lalitha-Padmini-Ragini Memorial Award; Viewers Choice Awards	Best Actress – Gaddama	
2011	Amritha TV – FEFKA Film Awards	Best Actress – Gaddama	
