= Oomappenninu Uriyadappayyan =

- Directed by: Vinayan
- Written by: Vinayan; Kaloor Dennis
- Screenplay by: Kaloor Dennis
- Story by: Vinayan
- Produced by: P. K. R. Pillai
- Starring: Jayasurya; Kavya Madhavan; Indrajith Sukumaran
- Cinematography: Uthpal V. Nayanar
- Edited by: G. Murali
- Music by: Mohan Sithara
- Production company: Shirdi Sai Creations
- Distributed by: Shirdi Sai Creations; Surya Cini Arts; Sivasakthi Release
- Release date: 5 April 2002
- Country: India
- Language: Malayalam

Oomappenninu Uriyadappayyan (transl. Mute boy for mute girl) is a 2002 Indian Malayalam-language romantic comedy film directed by Vinayan, written by Kaloor Dennis, and produced by P. K. R. Pillai under the banner of Shirdi Sai Creations. It stars Jayasurya and Indrajith Sukumaran in her debut film, along with Kavya Madhavan, who won the Asianet Film Award for Best Actress, and Indrajith Sukumaran.

== Plot ==
Bobby is an impoverished mute who earns a living by painting billboards for his boss. He falls in love with Gopika, a rich girl who cannot hear or speak and lives with her father and interpreter. She attends a show performed by Bobby and his friends. Gopika feels affection for Bobby once she learns that he is also a mute. However, to win Gopika's admiration, Bobby pretends he can speak and puts on a show in front of Gopika's interpreter. Believing that Bobby can speak, Gopika finds her affection for him waning. She eventually learns that Bobby cannot speak and falls in love with him again. Unfortunately, Gopika is betrothed to Shyam, a rich young man, whom she hates. Since Gopika's family is against her relationship with Bobby, they elope.

Shyam's family sends Chellappa, a police officer, to kill Bobby and bring back Gopika. Meanwhile, Gopika and Bobby hide with a street performing group led by Moopan, but are eventually found by Chellappa. He brings them both back to a hut near a cliff edge, where he beats Bobby unconscious and tries to rape Gopika. When Gopika knocks Chellappa out, she finds Bobby lying on the floor covered in blood. Thinking he is dead, she decides to walk up to the cliff by the house and jump off. Gopika's family arrives and sees her walking up the cliff and shouts at her to stop. Since Gopika is deaf, she is unable to hear their shouting and continues walking. Bobby wakes up and sees Gopika walking up the cliff. He runs after her and tries to shout but she does not hear him. To get Gopika's attention, Bobby picks up a lemon he finds on a nearby trident and throws it at her. She turns around and sees him. Gopika runs towards Bobby and they embrace.

== Cast ==
- Jayasurya as Bobby Oommen
- Kavya Madhavan as Gopika Rajashekhara Varma
- Indrajith as Shyam Gopal Varma
- Sai Kumar as Rajashekhara Varma
- Rizabawa as Mukunda Varma
- Cochin Haneefa as Punchiri Pushparaj
- Harisree Asokan as Kochu Kuttan
- Sudheesh as Tomy
- Jagadish as Karunan
- Kalpana as Kanyaka
- Mala Aravindan as Mooppan
- Rajan P. Dev as C.I. Chellappa Chettiar
- Indrans as Madhavan
- Bindu Panikkar as Thresiamma
- Karthika Mathew as Annie
- Baburaj as S. I. Perumal
- Sajitha Betti as Mooppan's daughter
- Sivaji as Dy.S.P. Haridas
- Yamuna as Shyam's mother
- Zeenath

== Soundtrack ==
Mohan Sithara scored the music for the film's songs, and the lyrics were written by Yusafali Kecheri and Vinayan. The music was distributed by Surya Cini Audios, Bluemoon Audios, and Rafa International.

Song	Singer(s)
"Swapnangal"	M. G. Sreekumar
"Adharam Sakhee Madhuram"	Sudeep Kumar
"Enikkum Oru Navundengil"	K. J. Yesudas, Sujatha Mohan
"Neela Nilave"	K. J. Yesudas
"Maninte Mizhiyulla"	M. G. Sreekumar
"Mullaykku Kalyanaprayam Aayennu"	M. G. Sreekumar, Sujatha Mohan, Sudeep Kumar
"Neela Nilave"	Sujatha Mohan
"Enikkum Oru Navundengil"	K. J. Yesudas

== Box office ==
The film was a commercial success at the box office.

== Remakes ==
Both Jayasurya and Kavya Madhavan reprised their roles in the Tamil remake En Mana Vaanil and Jayasurya also starred in the Kannada remake Sogasugara.
