= Kisan (film) =

- Directed by: Sibi Malayil
- Written by: Sachidandan Puzhankara; Sathyan Kolangad
- Story by: Paul Brothers
- Produced by: Jijo vembalan Asalam Thurakkal
- Starring: Biju Menon; Kalabhavan Mani; Bhavana; Geetu Mohandas
- Cinematography: Saloo George
- Edited by: L. Bhoominathan
- Music by: Kaithapram Viswanathan; Johnson
- Release date: 11 August 2006
- Country: India
- Language: Malayalam

Kisan (transl. Peasant) is a 2006 Indian Malayalam-language sports drama film directed by Sibi Malayil. The film stars Biju Menon, Kalabhavan Mani, Bhavana, and Geetu Mohandas. It was first titled Ilakal Pacha Pookal Manja and its release was planned for early 2004. Due to some technical difficulties, the film was shelved and the shooting began in 2006.

== Cast ==
- Biju Menon as Devendra Varma (Devan)
- Kalabhavan Mani as Velu
- Bhavana as Kilimathi, Velu's Sister
- Geetu Mohandas as Ammu/Ambili Varma
- Thilakan as Muthassan
- Risabava as Balaraman Varma
- Shalu Menon as Kalyani
- I.M Vijayan as Football Coach (himself)
- Zeenath as Savithri, Devan's mother
- Hakim Rawther as Velichapaadu
- Kalashala Babu as Education Minister
- Ponnamma Babu as Minister's PA
- Nishanth Sagar as Ambadi varma
- Kalabhavan Shajon as Kuyilan
- Geetha Salam as Ayyappan
- Dinesh Prabhakar as Velayudhan
- Kaviraj as Vinu
- Ambika Rao as Ammalu
- Bindu KS as Ammu's mother
- KPAC Sabu as MLA Kuttappayi

== Reception ==
A critic from Rediff.com wrote that "Kisan could have worked if it were technically superior and based on firmer narrative ground. Coming from a director of Sibi Malayil's stature though, it is a complete disappointment".
