= Kattuchembakam =

- Directed by: Vinayan
- Written by: Vinayan
- Produced by: M. Mani
- Starring: Jayasurya; Charmy Kaur; Anoop Menon; Karthika Mathew; Sonia; Manoj K. Jayan
- Cinematography: Uthpal V. Nayanar
- Edited by: G. Murali
- Music by: Mohan Sithara
- Distributed by: Sunitha Productions
- Release date: 27 November 2002
- Country: India
- Language: Malayalam

Kattuchembakam is a 2002 Indian Malayalam romance film starring Jayasurya, Anoop Menon and Charmy Kaur (In her Malayalam debut). The film was lyrics, written and directed by Vinayan. It was a box-office failure.

== Plot ==
Chandru and Shivan are two close friends living in the tribal village in the midst of a forest with their sisters Ammu and Chembakam, respectively. Chandru is in love with Chembagam and Shivan is in love with Ammu. They always have trouble with Kankani Rajappan who steals their supplies such as rice, sugar etc., When the village people find out about the theft, they confront Rajappan and start fighting with each other. When police arrive at the scene, they accuse Chandru and Shivan and get them arrested.

Chembakam is the most beautiful girl in the village and the police inspector who has had an eye on her for a very long time tries to rape her. S.P. Rajendran, the newly transferred police superintendent saves Chembakam from the inspector and becomes the saviour of the village people. Astonished by the beauty of nature, he decides to take off and stay in the village guest house. Also, he makes a proposal to marry Chembakam and take her back to town and thereby provide her a luxurious life. In spite of knowing Chandru is in love with Chembakam, Shivan agrees to give his sister's hand in marriage to Rajendran thinking that her sister will be fine for the rest of her life. Chandru confronts him at the river bank and they both fight. Shivan being stronger than Chandru manages to control him and says that no one can stop this marriage and that if Chandru comes in the way he would kill him. Chandru tries to kill Rajendran but fails. The night before the marriage, Chembakam elopes with Chandru and they both decide to commit suicide but only to be caught by the villagers red handed. Chandru is held as captive & Chembakam is married to S. P. Rajendran the same night without the knowledge of others. The next day they find the dead body of Rajendran and assume that Chandru is the killer. Chandru goes to the guest house and finds that Chembakam is missing and fights with Rajendran's friends. He returns to the village and learns that Rajendran is dead. Shivan confronts him and fights with him thinking that he ruined his sister's life. Chembakam arrives wearing blood stained clothes and confesses that she is the one who killed Rajendran. She also reveals that Rajendran married her only to make her a feast to his friends. They raped her in the name of marriage and she killed him after knowing this ugly truth. She confess to Chandru that she is no more a suitable girl for him to live with. Chandru replies that he loves her for her character and not for her beauty and they embrace each other.

== Cast ==
- Jayasurya as Chandru
- Charmy Kaur as Chembakam, Shivan's sister
- Anoop Menon as Shivan
- Karthika Mathew as Ammu, Chandru's sister
- Manoj K. Jayan as SP Rajendran IPS
- Cochin Haneefa as Kankani Rajappan
- Kottayam Nazeer as Ponnappan
- Harishree Ashokan as Antappan
- Indrans as Aandi
- Narayanankutty as Kaduva Kuruppu
- Janardhanan as ADGP Narendra Thampi IPS
- Mala Aravindan as Kattumooppan
- Machan Varghese as Karumban
- Kozhikode Sarada as Chandru's mother
- Prem Kumar as Sathyan, Supply Officer
- Shivaji as IG Vishwanathan IPS
- Sonia as Paaru
- Chali Pala as CI Shaji
- Bindu Ramakrishnan as Subadramma, Rajendran's mother
- Beena Sabu as Dakshyayani
