= Santhwanam =

1991 Indian film

- Theatrical release poster
- Directed by: Sibi Malayil
- Written by: J. Pallassery
- Produced by: Ousepachan Valakuzhy
- Starring: Nedumudi Venu; Meena; Bharathi
- Cinematography: Saloo George
- Edited by: L. Bhoominathan
- Music by: Mohan Sithara
- Production company: Valakuzhy Films
- Distributed by: Century Films
- Release date: 19 December 1991
- Country: India
- Language: Malayalam

Santhwanam (transl. Consolation) is a 1991 Indian Malayalam-language drama film directed by Sibi Malayil and written by J. Pallassery. It is a remake of the 1991 Telugu film Seetharamayya Gari Manavaralu. The film stars Nedumudi Venu, Meena, and Bharathi. The music was composed by Mohan Sithara.

Swanthwanam was released in theatres on 19 December 1991. The film is noted for the song "Unni Vaavavo," often credited as one of the best lullabies in Malayalam.

== Plot ==
Thambi and his wife Subhadra had only one child, Rajakumaran, who was fondly called Unni and was the pride of their joy. However, Unni fell for a woman and married against his parents' wishes. Years later, their granddaughter Rajalakshmi paid her first visit, bringing her closer to her grandparents without knowing that Unni and their daughter-in-law Chrisy had died.

== Cast ==
- Nedumudi Venu as Rajasekaran Thambi
- Meena as Rajalakshmi
- Bharathi as Subhadra
- Suresh Gopi as Rajakumaran Thambi, Thambi's son
- Jagathy Sreekumar as Kunjunni Nair
- M. S. Thripunithura as Swaminathan, Thambi's friend
- Murali as James
- Zainuddin as Venu, bank staff
- Rekha as Thambi's Niece
- Mamukkoya as Kareem bhai, boat driver
- Bindu Ramakrishnan as Thambi's relative

== Soundtrack ==
The film's soundtrack contains three songs, all composed by Mohan Sithara, with lyrics by Kaithapram. "Unni Vaavavo" is composed in sankarabharanam raga.

Santhwanam (Original Motion Picture Soundtrack)
No.	Title	Singer	Length
1.	"Swarakanyakamaar"	K. S. Chitra	5:13
2.	"Unni Vaavavo (F)"	K. S. Chitra	4:59
3.	"Unni Vaavavo (M)"	K. J. Yesudas	5:00

== Release ==
Swanthwanam was released in theatres on 19 December 1991. The lullaby "Unni Vaavavo" is often credited as one of the best lullabies in Malayalam, along with "Omanathinkal Kidavo" and "Thamarakannan Urangenam".
