= Naalai Namadhe (2009 film) =

- Theatrical release poster
- Directed by: Vinayan
- Written by: Vinayan; V. J. Antony (dialogues)
- Produced by: Jose Mavely
- Starring: Pradeep; Sharwanand; Sanusha
- Cinematography: Rajarathnam
- Edited by: Mukesh G. Murali
- Music by: Bharadwaj
- Production company: Jana Seva films
- Release date: 10 April 2009
- Running time: 135 minutes
- Country: India
- Language: Tamil

Naalai Namadhe (transl. Tomorrow is ours) is a 2009 Indian Tamil language film directed by Vinayan. The film stars newcomer Pradeep, Sharwanand (in his Tamil debut), Sanusha, Karthika Mathew, Kiran Rathod and Oviya (in her Tamil debut) with Manivannan, Ashish Vidyarthi, Rajan P. Dev, Tanikella Bharani, M. S. Bhaskar, and Charle playing supporting roles. Production began in May 2008, and the film was released on 10 April 2009.

== Plot ==
Udayappa is a wealthy businessman who donates 1800 crores for charitable purposes in his district. He asks District Collector Priya Alexander to entrust the job of spending the money to two slum dwellers: Mani and his adopted son Ramu. Udayappa instructs them to use the money to build houses for slum dwellers.

One night, a drunk Raju, the son of the greedy politician Mahaganapathy, attempts to rape Mani's adopted daughter Shanthi, but the prostitute Sarasu saves Shanthi. The next day, at a school function, Raju is invited as the chief guest and is shocked to see the schoolgirl Shanthi. Shanthi then gives a public speech and begs Raju to help the slum dwellers. Raju decides to become a good person, and he declares his love for her. Mahaganapathy and Ramasamy want to seize the money Udayappa gave, and they threaten Mani to hand over the 1800 crores. Mani and Ramu then kidnap Mahaganapathy to avert the blackmail. During the abduction, Mahaganapathy discovers Udayappa's dead body.

In the past, Udayappa was a small-time crook who forced the child Ramu to steal. One day, he burned a hovel where 24 orphaned kids were sleeping, and all of the children died. Many years later, Udayappa became a rich businessman by wrong means. To take revenge on him, Ramu kidnapped Udayappa's daughter Aishwarya and blackmailed him to donate a part of his fortune to the slum dwellers. Udayappa initially cooperated but then changed his mind.

When the election starts, Ramu decides to become an independent candidate, but because he is homeless and does not have a voter ID, he cannot contest. Ramu then asks the slum dwellers to vote none of the above, and NOTA gets the majority of votes. It is revealed that Udayappa is alive and sequestered by Mani. Mahaganapathy escapes from the place and orders his henchmen to kill Udayappa. Mahaganapathy then kidnaps Shanthi, and she gets brutally raped by his henchmen. Shanthi then kills Mahaganapathy and is arrested. Seven years later, Shanthi is released from jail and sees that her brother is the new Home Minister, while her lover, Raju, asks for her hand in marriage.

== Cast ==
- Pradeep as Ramu
- Sharwanand as Raju
- Sanusha as Shanthi
- Karthika Mathew as Priya Alexander
- Kiran Rathod as Sarasu
- Oviya as Aishwarya
- Manivannan as Mani
- Ashish Vidyarthi as Udayappa
- Rajan P. Dev as Mahaganapathy
- Tanikella Bharani as Ramasamy
- M. S. Bhaskar as DGP Pullaiah
- Mayilsamy as Kunjithapatham
- Crane Manohar as Poochi
- Muthukaalai as Kaattu Poonai
- Charle as Police Officer
- Leema Babu
- Vaiyapuri
- Kumaresan as Sundarrajan
- Thalaivasal Vijay in a guest appearance
- Ragasya in a special appearance

== Soundtrack ==
The soundtrack was composed by Bharadwaj, with lyrics written by Palani Bharathi.

Song	Duration
"Thaai Mannil"	3:54
"Naalai Namadhe"	4:16
"Kadavul Pole"	4:07
"Pudi Pudi Pudi"	3:21

== Reception ==
The Hindu wrote that "Many characters criss cross the screen – most of them vamoose and suddenly re-emerge only to fade away again. The intention could be noble but the execution is pathetic". Pavithra Srinivasan of Rediff.com rated the film 1 out of 5 and said, "It should have been en [sic] emotional roller-coaster but this flick is more akin to a road-roller".
