= MLA Mani: Patham Classum Gusthiyum =

- Directed by: Sreejith Paleri
- Written by: T. A. Shahid; Mohammed Nabilsha Saif
- Screenplay by: T. A. Shahid
- Story by: Kalabhavan Mani
- Produced by: Joy Mulavanal
- Starring: Kalabhavan Mani
- Cinematography: Sudhi
- Edited by: Mentos Antony
- Music by: Kalabhavan Mani
- Release date: 20 April 2012
- Country: India
- Language: Malayalam

MLA Mani: Patham Classum Gusthiyum is a 2012 Indian Malayalam-language film directed by Sreejith Paleri, featuring Kalabhavan Mani in the lead role.

== Cast ==
- Kalabhavan Mani as Manikandan (MLA Mani)
- Siddique as SP Benjamin Martin IPS
- Vijayaraghavan as Vattakkadan Varkey
- Harisree Ashokan as Pushkaran
- Lena as MLA Lakshmi Priya
- Vidhya Mohan as Meenakshi
- Sadhika Venugopal as Parvathi
- Babu Namboothiri as Asainar Mash
- Anand as Ananthan
- Kiran Raj as Johnson
- Shammi Thilakan as Amir Hussain
- Kalabhavan Shajohn as Neelakandan
- Abu Salim as Govindan
- Chembil Ashokan as Minister Kasim Haji
- Ambika Mohan as Lakshmi Priya's mother
- Nisha Sarang
- Manjusha Sajish aka Manju Raghavan as Akhila

== Songs ==
All lyrics are written by Murukan Kattakada; all music is composed by Kalabhavan Mani

No.	Title	Singers	Length
1.	"Ambalakkulakkadavil"	Kalabhavan Mani
2.	"Innale Nerathu"	Kalabhavan Mani

== Reception ==
A critic from The Times of India gave the film a rating of two out of five stars and said that MLA Mani Patham Classum Gusthiyum will bring more joy to Kalabhavan Mani than any of the other films, in which he has played the lead, have. Hardly a single frame in the movie goes without Mani".
