= Kalabhavan Mani =

Indian actor, singer (1971–2016)

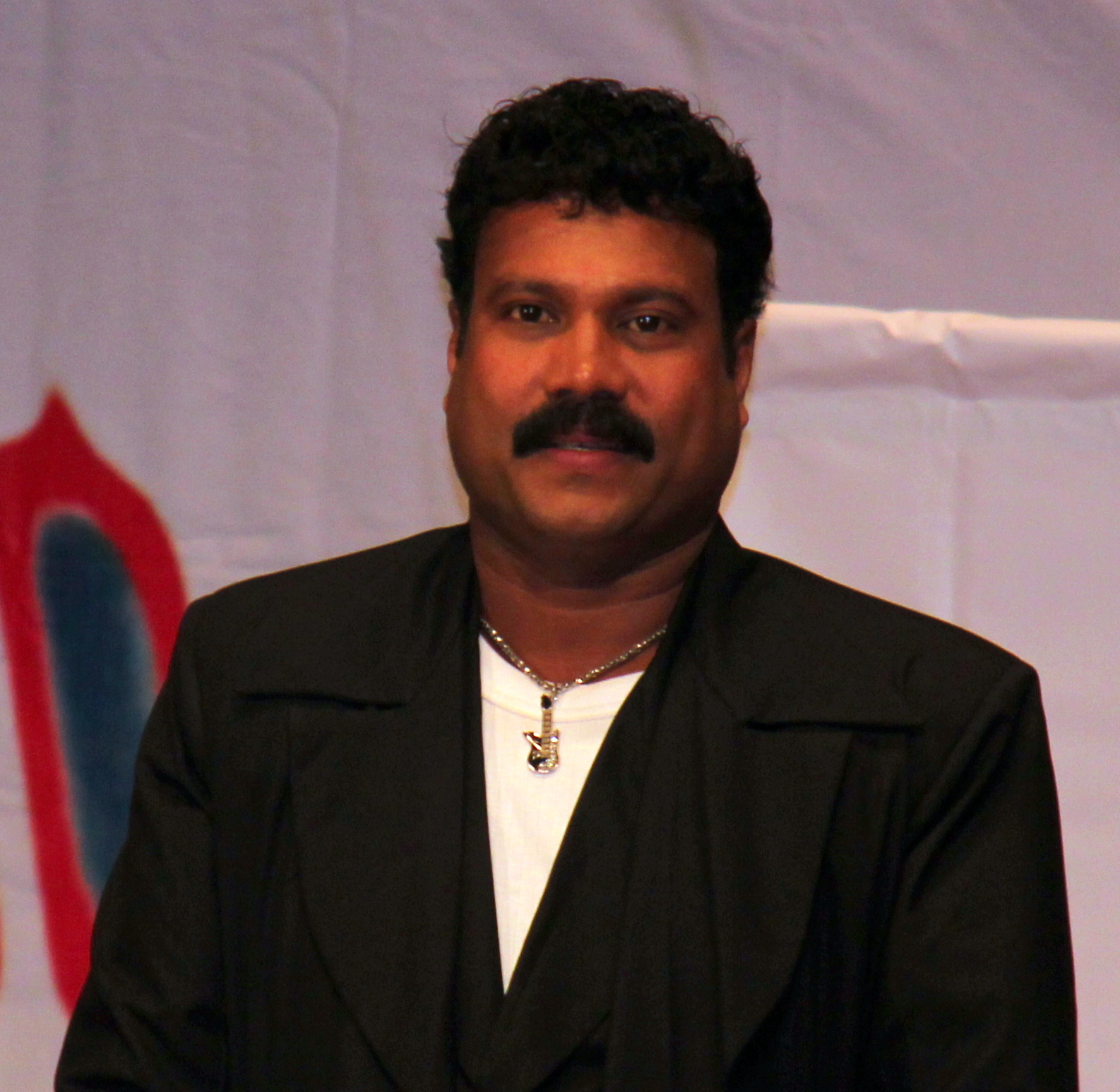
- Mani in 2010
- Born: 1 January 1971; Chalakudy, Thrissur district, Kerala
- Died: March 6, 2016 (aged 45); Chalakudy
- Occupations: Film actor; singer
- Years active: 1995–2016
- Spouse: Nimmy Mani (m. 1999)
- Children: 1
- Relatives: R. L. V. Ramakrishnan (Brother)

Kunnisseri Veettil Raman Mani (1 January 1971 - 6 March 2016), better known by his stage name Kalabhavan Mani, was an Indian actor and singer. Mani started his career as a mimic with the Kalabhavan comedy troupe. He had starred in over 250 films, including Malayalam, Tamil, Kannada, and Telugu films, and was renowned for his humorous characters and villain roles.

Mani won National Film Award – Special Jury Award and Kerala State Film Awards for his performance as Ramu in Vasanthiyum Lakshmiyum Pinne Njaanum (1999).

== Early life ==
Kalabhavan Mani was born as Kunnisseri Veettil Raman Mani in Kerala to Chenathunad Kunnisseri Veettil Raman and Ammini at Chalakudy, Thrissur district, on New Year's Day of 1971.

Mani had an elder brother, Velayudan (deceased); a younger brother, R. L. V. Ramakrishnan (dancer); and four sisters, Thankamani, Leela, Santha, and Ammini Jr. He studied at Government L. P. School, Chalakudy, till 4th grade and then at Government Boys School, Chalakudy, till 10th grade.

Mani married Nimmy on 22 September 1999 and has a daughter named Sreelakshmi, born in 2000. He was once working as an autorickshaw driver in Chalakudy. His brother, R. L. V. Ramakrishnan, has acted in the movie Bamboo Boys.

== Career ==
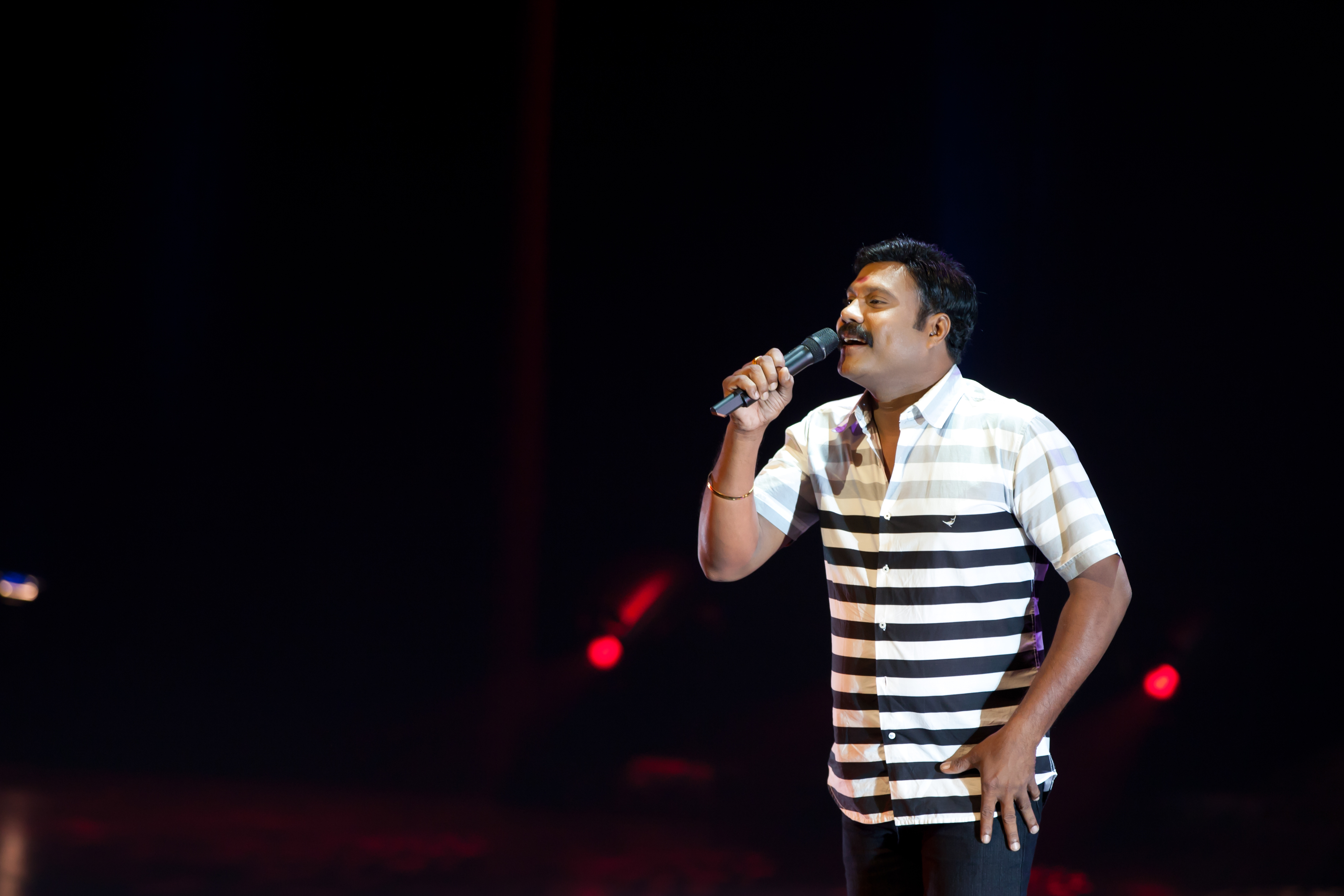
Mani during a stage program.

He started his career as a mimic with the drama group Kalabhavan. His film debut was as a junior artist in Vijayakanth Captain Prabhakaran. He started his acting career in the Malayalam film Aksharam as an auto rickshaw driver. He got his first major breakthrough with the Lohithadas movie Sallapam (1996), which was a hit. After this, he acted in several movies in the comedy roles. He did some notable roles in movies such as Dilliwala Rajakumaran, Manthra Mothiram, Gajaraja Manthram, Katha Nayakan, Mayaponman and Kottappurathe Koottukudumbam. Mani's comic role as Monayi in the 1998 movie Summer in Bethlehem was appreciated among the audience. After portraying several comic characters, his true potential to do the character roles was revealed in the film Vasanthiyum Lakshmiyum Pinne Njaanum. He did the role of a blind singer in it which earned him the Special Jury Award at both National Film Awards and Kerala State Film Awards. These awards helped Mani to do the character roles and villain roles in several movies while also doing comedy roles in numerous films. In Vakkalathu Narayanankutty (2001), he played the villain role. However his performance as villain was first noted in the movie Rakshasa Rajavu (2001), where he played the role of a crooked corrupt politician called Gunasekharan. The Guard is unique film as it has only Mani as a star cast in it. His performance as a poor eccentric person called Kuttan in Karumadikuttan received high appreciation. Mani returned to his unique comical role with the Jayaram starrer One man show. Mani was praised for his performance in Valkannadi (2002). The revenge drama had Mani in the role of Appunni, a blacksmith with a history of mental illness. He was also noted for his performance in the character role in Malayali Mamanu Vanakkam. After the comedy movies Kuberan and Bamboo Boys, both of them released in 2002, Mani almost shifted his complete focus on doing character and villain roles. Mani's notable movies in 2003 include Vellithira, Balettan, Pattalam and War and Love. He once again returned to do the comedy role with the 2004 Priyadarshan screwball comedy movie Vettam, which is probably his last notable movie in a complete comic role. He also had a small appearance in Magic Lamp. Mani's performance as Chemban Gurukkal, the blind master martial artist, in Ananthabhadram (2005) received high appreciation. In Ben Johnson, he played the role of an action hero for the first time. It was one of the highest-grossing movies in 2005. His villain Role as Komalan in the movie Pouran(2005) also noted. The success of Ben Johnson saw Mani playing the similar hero roles in movies such as Lokanathan IAS, Chacko Randaaman, Kisan, Payum Puli, Red Salute etc. He got a lot of praise for his performance as the villain in Chotta Mumbai (2007). In the movie, Mani played the character called Nateshan, which is considered one of the biggest villain characters in Malayalam. Mani played the lead role in the family drama Aayirathil Oruvan (2009), which was critically acclaimed In 2010, Mani acted in several films in the lead roles such as Orange, Pulliman, Black Stallion and Canvas. However, most of these were a huge failure at box office. In 2012, he acted in the multi-starrer crime drama film Bachelor Party. His performance as Looyi Papan in Amen (2013) was acclaimed by both the critics and audience. Mani's last Malayalam movie is Poyi Maranju Parayathe, which was released in 2016 after his death.

He grabbed everyone's attention in the Tamil film industry as the villain in the movie Gemini (2002), which featured Vikram in the lead role. He acted in more than 30 Tamil films along with numerous Kannada and Telugu films. His last Tamil film is Pudhusa Naan Poranthen released in 2016.

Along with his acting career, Mani established a parallel industry of Nadan Pattu (folk songs), by selling a record number of releases. His first music album was Kannimanga Prayathil. Most of his songs were written and composed by Arumugan Venkidangu. He also released several religious songs and Mappila Pattukal.

== Charity ==
Mani is well known for providing humanitarian assistance to people in need. He was approached and was offered a seat in the 2016 Kerala Legislative Assembly election by LDF. He had openly told that he was a Leftist and used to Campaign for CPI(M) and left parties during elections. Mani is known for doing a lot of charity work for the poor people. Reportedly, on an average day, around 20 people from less privileged backgrounds used to come to visit him at his residence. As a fund-raiser and performer, he also had contributed money to the local festivals of the religious organisations and provided funds to the schools in his village.

== Death ==
Kalabhavan Mani died at 7:15 pm on 6 March 2016, aged 45. The day before, he was admitted to Amrita Hospital, Kochi, with haematemesis (vomiting of blood) and was in the ICU. The police registered a case as Manner of death due to the presence of excessive Methanol (a toxic chemical found in illicit liquor, Arrack) with Paracetamol in Kalabhavan Mani's body.

On 8 March 2016, based on the initial autopsy report and statements of witnesses, the police said that serious alcoholic fatty liver illness along with alcohol consumption may have caused his death and it might have been a suicide attempt. Four months prior to his death, doctors had categorically warned him against drinking alcohol and he was counselled for severe depression. However, Mani in his phase of depression and informed of severe liver damage conditions, ignored the doctors' warnings and continued with alcoholism. Even on the day before he died, he was allegedly reported consuming alcohol (beer) with friends in the outhouse of his house.

His unexpected death led to a case by his friends and family which has been filed for investigation through Kochi City Police. On 18 March 2016, based on the forensic test from the Regional Chemical Examiner's Laboratory, death cause was identified with high probability a highly poisonous chemical, Chlorpyrifos—usually used in insecticides, which is banned in many countries for residential use, it is considered a hazardous substance for general ecology. Presence of chlorpyrifos along with methyl and ethyl alcohol contents were found excessively in the test samples. The report suggests that Mani might have consumed the poison knowingly or unknowingly over the days before his death. Therefore, the Government of Kerala has ordered a comprehensive probe in the death of Mani. The police is rounding the case through whom Mani could have accessed this poisonous concoction for substance abuse. Under RLV Ramakrishnan's suspicion Mani's three close friends have been taken into custody for questioning to rule out activities of vested interest. On 11 June 2016, based on the recommendation of the state DGP, the Government of Kerala has decided the case to be investigated by CBI. In May 2017 CBI took over the case and submitted FIR in which it was stated that the death of Kalabhavan Mani was due to unusual reasons.

His sudden demise led to emotional reactions from his fans and many of his co-stars in the Malayalam Film Industry along with the rest of the South Indian Film Industry. The Malayalam film fraternity and thousands of fans of late actor Kalabhavan Mani paid homage to the versatile artiste during a memorial service on 13 March 2016, at Carmel Higher Secondary School in Chalakudy organised by well-wishers. Tributes were celebrated through the media with 2–3 hours programme special. Mani was cremated with full state honours at his home premises on 7 March. The shopkeepers of Chalakudy paid homage to Mani by closing their shops on the same day.

== Legacy ==
Chalakkudikkaran Changathi is a 2018 Malayalam biopic film directed by Vinayan based on the life of Kalabhavan Mani.

== Controversies ==
In an interview with journalist John Brittas, Mani stated that the State Government Award could easily have been bought off.

On 14 May 2013, Mani has been accused of assaulting two forest officials during a routine inspection at Athirappilly. However, those who had claimed to be travelling with Mani in the same car, had filed a complaint against the forest officials for abusing them. The police have registered cases against both Mani and the injured forest officials. Later, Mani was arrested and charged when he surrendered to the police. He was granted bail by the High Court of Kerala with conditions on it. Mani and his friends had been on a trip to the tourist place when forest officials intervened and said they wanted to search his vehicle. It was alleged that the officials started having an argument with Mani, allegedly hit the actor, verbally assaulted his Other Backward Class caste and stated Kalabhavan Mani was a "Dalit" and misbehaved with his friends' wives on the car. T. P. Senkumar of then Kerala Police ADGP had said that Mani was unnecessarily harassed by the officials and the actual reason behind the assault case against Mani was that he belonged to a lower caste and that discrimination against the ordinary and lower class exists in the Kerala Police force. However, the High Court criticised ADGP regarding the statement. On the other hand, the officials had alleged that Mani was in a drunk condition and also a main accused in two other assault cases. During an interview at Kairali channel, Mani said that jealousy had caused the officials registering the false case against him and the police officer who beat him had a criminal background of four charges.

== Awards and honours ==
National Film Awards

- 1999 – Special Jury Award – Vasantiyum Lakshmiyum Pinne Njanum

Kerala State Film Awards

- 1999 – Special Jury Award – Vasantiyum Lakshmiyum Pinne Njanum

Filmfare Awards

- 2002 – Best Villain (Tamil) – Gemini

Asianet Film Awards

- 1999 – Best Actor Award – Vasantiyum Lakshmiyum Pinne Njanum
- 2007 – Best Actor in a Villain Role – Chotta Mumbai

Vanitha awards

- 2008 – Vanitha Chandrika Award for Best Actor in Villain Role– Chotta Mumbai

Jaihind TV awards

- 2010 – Special Jury Award

Other awards

- 2014 Bharat Gopi Foundation Award

== Filmography ==
=== Malayalam films ===
==== 1990s ====
List of Kalabhavan Mani 1990s Malayalam film credits
Year	Film	Role	Notes
1994	The Porter	Xavi	
1995	Aksharam	Auto Rickshaw driver	
1995	Samudayam	Fishmonger	
1996	Sallapam	Rajappan	
1996	Saamoohya Paadam	K.K. Karunan	
1996	Swarna Kireedam	Maniyan	
1996	Manthrika Kuthira	Philip	
1996	Kireedamillatha Rajakkanmar	Superfast Chandren	
1996	Kalyanasougandhikam	Balagopalan	
1996	Kaathil Oru Kinnaram	Police Inspector Babu	Cameo
1996	Naalamkettile Nalla Thampimar		
1996	Excuse Me Ethu Collegila	Appukuttan	
1996	Udhyanapalakan	Joseph	
1996	Padanayakan	Komalan	
1996	Dilliwala Rajakumaran	Mani	
1997	Mannadiar Penninu Chenkotta Checkan	Madhavan	
1997	Vaachalam	Appukuttan	
1997	Ullasappoonkattu	Musthafa	
1997	Manthra Mothiram	Pappachan	
1997	Kudamattom	as Jeevan	
1997	Karunyam	Rajan	
1997	Kalyanappittannu		
1997	Kottappurathe Koottukudumbam	Vamadevan	
1997	The Good Boys	Gopalakrishnan	
1997	Gajaraja Manthram	Paraman	
1997	Ikkareyanente Manasam	Uthaman	
1997	Newspaper Boy	Peasa	
1997	Guru Sishyan	Sugunan	
1997	Siamese Irattakal	Sunil	
1997	Sammanam	Moideen	
1997	Bhoothakkannadi	Ayyappan	
1997	Shibiram	Thomaskutty	
1997	My Dear Kuttichathan	Magician	
1997	Bharatheeyam	Mani	
1997	Rajathanthram	Adv. P.K. Sivakumar	
1997	Ancharakalyanam	Kochappi	
1997	The Car	Cheriyan	
1997	Aaram Thamburan	Younger Namboothiri	
1997	Katha Nayakan	Kuttan	
1997	Mayaponman	Fredy Lopez	
1998	Meenathil Thalikettu	Achootty	
1998	Manthri Maalikayil Manasammatham	Philip	
1998	Ilamura Thamburan	Kumaran	
1998	British Market	SI Hameed	Dual roles
1998	Summer in Bethlahem	Monai	
1998	Oro Viliyum Kathorthu	Varunni	
1998	Oru Maravathoor Kanavu	O.C. Antappan	
1998	Achamakuttiyude Achayan	Sibi	
1998	Meenakshi Kalyanam	Pushkaran	
1998	Chitrashalabham	Bakkar Parappanangadi	
1998	Kottaram Veettile Apputtan	Maniyan	
1998	Malabaril Ninnoru Manimaaran	Sashankan	
1998	Kattathoru Penpoovu		
1998	Kudumba Vaarthakal	Lonayi	
1998	Kaikudunna Nilavu	Lakshmanan	
1998	Aalibabayum Aarara Kallanmarum	Palacharakku Chandi	
1999	Onnaamvattam Kandappol	Rajani Muthu	
1999	Pranaya Nilavu	Moosootty	
1999	Panchapandavar	Sathyanarayanan	
1999	Kannezhuthi Pottum Thottu	Moosakutty's friend	
1999	Saaphalyam	Narayanankutty	
1999	Crime File	Ezhuthachan	
1999	Pallavur Devanarayanan	Vasu	
1999	Captain	Veeramani	
1999	My Dear Karady	Manikantan	
1999	James Bond	Mathappan	
1999	Independence	Murali	
1999	Onnaamvattam Kandappol	Rajani Muththu	
1999	Aakasha Ganga	Fr. Vettikalan	
1999	Vasanthiyum Lakshmiyum Pinne Njaanum	Ramu	

==== 2000s ====
List of Kalabhavan Mani 2000s Malayalam film credits
Year	Film	Role	Notes
2000	Millennium Stars		
2000	The Gang	Stephen	
2000	Ival Draupadi	Alex David	
2000	Narasimham	Bharathan	
2000	Rapid Action Force	SI Arjun	
2000	Ingane Oru Nilapakshi	Moideen	
2000	Varnakkazhchakal	Kunjandi	
2000	Valyettan	Kattipalli Pappan	
2000	Mr. Butler	'Major' Kuttan	
2000	Kochu Kochu Santhoshangal	Sudhakaran	
2000	Daivathinte Makan	Eeshwar	
2000	Dada Sahib	Thankachan	
2001	Nalacharitham Naalam Divasam	Maina	
2001	Soothradharan	Ramesan's brother in law	
2001	Vakkalathu Narayanankutty		
2001	Rakshasa Rajavu	Gunashekharan	
2001	Dhosth	V.Jayan	
2001	Karumadikkuttan	Kuttan, 'Karumadi'	
2001	Antholanam	Thankappan	
2001	Nariman	Thief	
2001	Akashathile Paravakal	Udumbu Vasu	
2001	Ee Naadu Innale Vare	Seyad	
2001	Fort Kochi		
2001	Bharthavudyogam	BBC Ramji	
2001	Achaneyanenikkishtam	Bhaskaran	
2001	One Man Show	Ponnappan	
2001	The Guard	Appu Kuttan Nair, Thomachan	
2002	Valkannadi	Appunni	
2002	Akhila	Mukundan	
2002	Nandanam	Mahadevan	
2002	Savithriyude Aranjanam	Phayaalvan Phalgunan	
2002	Malayali Mamanu Vanakkam	Thiruppathy Perumal / Muniyandi	
2002	Kuberan	Ramanujan	
2002	Kanmashi	Murugan	
2002	Jagathy Jagadeesh in Town	Malleswaran	
2002	Bamboo Boys	Olanga	
2002	House owner		
2002	Nakshathrakkannulla Rajakumaran Avanundoru Rajakumari	Kochu Kurup	
2003	Vellithira	Vakkathi Vasu	
2003	Balettan	Musthafa	
2003	Pattalam	Moythu Pilakkandi	
2003	Relax	Muthu	
2003	Malsaram	Kuppikandam Hamsa	
2003	Shingari Bolona	Classy Kariyachan	
2003	War and Love	Basheer	
2004	Sethurama Iyer CBI	Isow Alex	
2004	C.I. Mahadevan 5 Adi 4 Inchu	Karimpuli Antony	
2004	Kanninum Kannadikkum	Praav / Maniyan	
2004	Thalamelam	Ramakrishnan	
2004	Maratha Naadu	Bharathan	
2004	Mayilattam		
2004	Kusruthi	Ezhumangalam Panan Gurukkal	
2004	Mal		
2004	Paanchajanyam		
2004	Vettam	Mani	
2004	Natturajavu	Manikuttan	
2004	Mampazhakkalam	George	
2004	Magic Lamp	Chalakkudy Manikandan (an impersonation of himself)	
2005	Iruvattam Manavaatti	Korathu Raghavan	
2005	Annorikkal	Pandi	
2005	Pauran	Komalan	
2005	Ponmudipuzhayorathu	Police officer	
2005	Arabikadhakal	Sindbad	
2005	Ben Johnson	Ben Johnson and Amarakaran Pathrose	
2005	Manikyan	Manikyan	
2005	Udayon	Mathan	
2005	Lokanathan IAS	Lokanathan	
2005	Ananthabhadram	Chemban	
2005	Mayookham		
2006	Ravanan	Ravanan/Varghese Antony	
2006	Chinthamani Kolacase	Ayyappadas	
2006	Narakasuran		
2006	Kisan	Velu	
2006	Chacko Randaman	Arakkalveetil Chacko Mathai (Ottachavittu Chacko), Chacko Randaman and Johnny Kutty	Triple roles
2006	Red Salute	Vasu	
2006	Kali	Rajagopalan Nair	
2007	Abraham & Lincoln	Abraham	
2007	Rakshakan	Mukundhan	
2007	Payum Puli	Saravanan	
2007	Bhasmasuran		
2007	Nasrani	Sukumaran	
2007	Nanma	Muthu Chettiyar	
2007	Indrajith	'Changoottam' Babu	
2007	Nagaram	Ponnayaya Thevar	
2007	Chotta Mumbai	Nadeshan	
2008	Swarnam	Divakaran	
2008	Kerala Police	Satyanath	
2008	Parthan Kanda Paralokam	Veerabhadran / Musafir	
2008	Shakespeare M.A. Malayalam	Kottayam Gopalan	
2008	Aandavan	Aandavan	
2008	Chempada		
2008	Kabadi Kabadi	Madhavankutty	
2008	Mayabazar	Bhadran	
2008	Apoorva		
2008	Bullet	C I Wahid Abdul Rahman Haji	
2008	Twenty:20	Karinkal Pappachan	
2009	Oru Black and White Kudumbam	Antony	
2009	Aayirathil Oruvan	Aravindan	
2009	Shudharil Shudhan	Mani	
2009	Currency	Iruttu	
2009	Malayali	Nanthileththu Madhavan	
2009	Pramukhan	Tomy Sebastian	
2009	Katha Parayum Theruvoram		
2009	Keralotsavam 2009	Jacob Isaac	

==== 2010s ====
List of Kalabhavan Mani 2010s Malayalam film credits
Year	Film	Role	Notes
2010	Black Stallion	Black	
2010	3 Char Sau Bees	Raghavan	
2010	Oridathoru Postman	SI Shahul Hameed	
2010	Holidays	Vinod	
2010	Annarakannanum Thannalayathu	Changampuzha Pavithran	
2010	Canvas	Manaf Hussain	
2010	Pulliman	Kunjunni	
2010	Yugapurushan	Koran	
2010	Shikkar	Mani	
2010	Chekavar	Garudan Raghavan	
2010	Oru Small Family	C I Bhargavan	
2011	Baktha Janangalude Sradhakku	Uncle	
2011	Adaminte Makan Abu	Johnson	
2011	Aazhakadal	Vazhapilly Kunjumon Tharakan	
2011	The Filmstaar	Sooryakiran (Kannan)	
2011	Manushyamrugam	Circle Inspector Rajeev	
2011	Priyappetta Nattukare	Sakhav Dasan	
2011	Veeraputhran	Undakakka	
2012	Madirasi	Johny	
2012	Snake & Ladder	Viswanathan	
2012	Orange	Yakobi	
2012	Face 2 Face	C.I. Abdul Latheef	
2012	MLA Mani: Patham Classum Gusthiyum	Mani	
2012	Bachelor Party	Ayyappan	
2012	Husbands in Goa	Sub Inspector Imran Khalid	
2012	Ayalum Njanum Thammil	ASI Purushothaman	
2012	Prabhuvinte Makkal		
2013	120 Minutes	Balaji	
2013	Oru Kudumba Chithram	Arunagiri	
2013	Tourist Home	Sugunan	
2013	Amen	Looyi Pappan	
2013	Rebecca Uthup Kizhakkemala	Gabriel	
2013	Crocodile Love Story	Sharp Shooter Suresh	
2013	Careebeyans	Vishwanathan, Charlie and Charles	
2013	Olipporu	Kumaran	
2014	Gunda		
2014	Parankimala		
2014	Konthayum Poonoolum	Police officer	
2014	Kaaranavar		
2014	Chakkaramampazham	Sekhara Menon	
2014	Kaaranavar		
2014	Onnum Onnum Moonu	Ambulance Driver	
2015	Alif	Chandran	
2015	Ayal Njaanalla		
2015	Kerala Today		
2015	Loka Samastha	Chinthal Rajan	
2015	Iruvazhi Thiriyunidam		
2015	Elinjikkavu PO		
2015	Wonderful Journey		
2015	Moonam Naal	Balachandran	
2015	Compartment		
2015	Mythri	Kaala Pratapan	Malayalam version
2016	Mayapuri 3D		
2016	Turning Point		
2016	Yathra Chodikkathe	Balan	
2016	Poyi Maranju Parayathe	Rahul	

=== Tamil films ===
List of Kalabhavan Mani Tamil film credits
Year	Film	Role	Notes
1991	Captain Prabhakaran		Junior artist
1998	Marumalarchi	Velu	
2001	Vaanchinathan	Maya	
2002	Gemini	Teja	
2003	Banda Paramasivam	Sivam	
2003	Pudhiya Geethai	Reddiyar	
2003	Kadhal Kisu Kisu	Karunakaran	
2003	Naam	Police officer	
2003	Jay Jay	KTM	
2003	Thathi Thavadhu Manasu	Ramaiya	
2004	Kuthu	Veerabahu	
2004	Singara Chennai	Kumar	
2004	Sema Ragalai		
2004	Bose	Kottaiperumal	
2004	Aai	Mani	
2005	Sevvel	Parasuram	
2005	Jithan	Singampuli (Muthupandi)	
2005	Anniyan	Ponnambalam	
2005	Mazhai	Sundaramoorthy	
2005	Aaru	ACP Rajavelu	
2006	Pasa Kiligal	Alakalan	
2006	Something Something Unakkum Enakkum	"Mark" Mayandi	
2007	Vel	Sakkara Pandi	
2009	Modhi Vilayadu	Rajan Vasudev	
2010	Enthiran	Pachaimuthu	
2012	Yaarukku Theriyum	Balaji	
2015	Kangaroo	Ticket	
2015	Papanasam	Constable Perumal	
2015	Kalai Vendhan	Panneerselvam	
2016	Pudhusa Naan Poranthen	Police Inspector	Cameo

=== Telugu films ===
List of Kalabhavan Mani Telugu film credits
Year	Film	Role
2002	Gemini	Ladda
2003	Aayudham	Special Officer
2004	Arjun	Doranna
2005	Narasimhudu	Pothuraju
2006	Brahmastram	Vasudev
2007	Evadaithe Nakenti	DNK
2008	Nagaram	Police Inspector

=== Kannada films ===
List of Kalabhavan Mani Kannada film credits
Year	Film	Role
2004	Durgi	Marigudi
2012	Challenge	Balaji

=== As playback singer ===
- Sammanam (1995)
- Kottaram Veettile Apputtan (1998)
- Kannezhuthi Pottum Thottu (1999)
- Vasanthiyum Lakshmiyum Pinne Njanum (1999)
- O Priye (2000)
- Achaneyanishttam (2001)
- Akasthile Paravakal (2001)
- The Guard (2001)
- Karumadikkuttan (2001)
- Bamboo Boys (2002)
- Kanmashi (2002)
- Vaalkannadi (2002)
- Kusruthy Kannan (2003)
- Pulival Kalyanam (2003)
- Kanninum Kannadiykkum (2004)
- Kazhcha (2004)
- Malsaram (2004)
- Ananthabhadram (2005)
- Ben Johnson (2005)
- Chacko Randaaman (2006)
- Kissan (2006)
- Red Salute (2006)
- Abraham Lincoln (2007)
- Evan (2007)
- Chakorandaman (2006)
- Indrajith (2006)
- Aandavan (2007)
- Paayum Puli (2007)
- Kabadi Kabadi (2008)
- Twenty Twenty (2010)

=== As music director ===
List of Kalabhavan Mani film music director credits
Year	Soundtrack/Pop Albums
2011	Mani Muzhagunnathu Arkkuvendi
2012	MLA Mani Pathaam Classum Gusthiyum

=== Story ===
- MLA Mani Pathaam Classum Gusthiyum (2012)

== Television ==
- Manimelam as host (Kairali TV)
- Gajarajan Guruvayur Keshavan (Surya TV)
- Meera (Asianet)
- Vinodsala (Doordarshan)
- Chiri Arangu (Doordarshan)
