= Malayali (film) =

- Directed by: C. S. Sudhesh
- Written by: J. Pallassery
- Produced by: Praghesh Sukumaran; Shajil Majeed
- Starring: Kalabhavan Mani; Murali; Niya
- Cinematography: P.Sukumar
- Edited by: Hariharaputhran
- Music by: Mohan Sithara
- Production company: Lal Media
- Distributed by: Real Cinema Release
- Release date: 19 June 2009
- Country: India
- Language: Malayalam

Malayali is a 2009 Indian Malayalam-language film directed by C. S. Sudhesh and starring Kalabhavan Mani.

== Plot ==
Madhavan is an old fashioned guy who is loved by everyone in his village. Madhavan loves Malayalam and the Malayalee culture, unlike his brothers Satheeshan and Rameshan. They (and their respective wives) dislike Madhavan playing "big brother" and making all the decisions. Madhavan's brothers-in-law are also against him.

Satheeshan, Rameshan and the brothers-in-law plan to build a heritage resort on their land, which is ancestral property being looked after by Madhavan. Madhavan initially opposes the move but leaves it to his brothers when his mother forces him.

Madhavan goes to Palani, to pray at the temple there. There he meets retired station master Viswanathan Menon. Menon is there to recover the money that one Gounder owes him. But things take a twist when Menon is found dead in his lodge room. Madhavan is arrested as a suspect, but is released after it is proved that the death was due to heart failure. Madhavan anyway decides to go to Viswanathan Menon's place. The plot develops from there.

== Cast ==
- Kalabhavan Mani as Madhavan
- Madhu Warrier as Rameshan
- Irshad as Satheeshan
- K. R. Vijaya
- Murali as Viswanathan Menon
- Jagathy Sreekumar as Aashan
- Niya Renjith as Meera
- K. P. A. C. Lalitha as Amma
- Sreehari as Rajendran
- Sadiq as Narendran
- Bijukuttan as Bharathan
- Salim Kumar as Mohanakrishnan
- Shivaji Guruvayoor as Georgettan
- Seema G. Nair
- Chali Pala as Shakthivel
- Jaffer Idukki as Jabbar
- Mohan Sithara as himself (cameo appearance)
- Raksha Raj
