= War and Love (2003 film) =

Indian Malayalam war film

- Directed by: Vinayan
- Written by: J. Pallassery
- Starring: Dileep; Prabhu; Laila; Mukesh Rishi; Kalabhavan Mani; Siddique
- Cinematography: Alagappan N.
- Edited by: G. Murali
- Music by: Mohan Sithara
- Distributed by: Sree Surya
- Release date: 26 November 2003
- Running time: 143 minutes
- Country: India
- Language: Malayalam

War and Love is a 2003 Indian Malayalam-language epic drama war film directed by Vinayan and starring Dileep, Prabhu, Laila, Mukesh Rishi, Kalabhavan Mani and Siddique. The film received extremely negative reviews upon its release. The film was dubbed in Tamil as Kalam.

== Plot ==
The film begins with Major Rajendran being killed by Pakistani terrorists on the Indo-Pakistan border and the war between India and Pakistan begins. The Pakistan Army led by General Jaffer Khan sends a battalion to capture a village on the Indian side of the Line of Control. The Indian Army Brigadier Nair sends the Madras Regiment to recapture the village. The Madras Regiment contains Lt. Col. Sharath Chandran, Captain Gopinath, Major Prabhakar, Captain Kabir, Captain Vijayan, Havildar Kurian, Sepoy Basheer, Naik Haneefa, Havildar Prashanthan, Naik Kunjunni, Captain Hema and Private Shankar. They recapture the village after a fierce gun battle that kills all of the Pakistani soldiers. Prabhakar and Kunjunni die during the battle. Jaffer Khan is angered by this defeat and plans to capture the entire Madras Regiment alive. He calls Colonel Mushtaq Muhammad, an ISI agent in the Indian Army, and pays him ₹50,000,000 for capturing the Madras Regiment.

Mushtaq Muhammad hatches a plan in which all of the Madras Regiment except, Gopinath and Vijayan were captured. Gopi kills Mushtaq, but is captured by the Pakistanis. All the prisoners of war are sent to a Pakistani camp, where they get tortured. They are forced to work like slaves. Kabir, Haneefa, Kurian and Hema (Sharath's love interest) are killed by the Pakistanis. Meanwhile, the notorious Pakistani terrorist leader Mansoor Akthar arrives in the camp. Jaffer Khan's daughter Serina also arrives there. She is about to be raped by Mansoor, but Gopi kills him by dropping a big rock on the terrorist's head. Serina falls in love with Gopi while he decides to use it to save his country. Serina knows Malayalam since Jaffer Khan's father migrated from Malappuram to Pakistan during the Partition. Meanwhile, Captain Vijayan has infiltrated the Pakistani military and gets information that Pakistan is going to use nuclear weapons in the event of a lost war with India. Gopi, with the help of Serina, gains access to the defusing codes of the missile. The climax is a full war between Indian PoWs freed by Vijayan and the Pakistani army. Finally, the nuclear bomb is defused by Gopi and the entire Pakistani army is killed. Jaffer Khan is killed by Sharath, who also dies from his injuries. The entire Pakistani camp is blown up and only Gopi, Serina and Vijayan survive. India wins the war and Gopi is given Param Vir Chakra on his return to India. Gopi marries Serina. The film ends with Serina chanting "Bharat Mata Ki Jai".

== Cast ==
- Dileep as Captain Gopinath
- Prabhu as Lt Col. Sharath Chandran
- Siddique in Double role as
  - Captain Kabir
  - Dadasaheb, Kabir's father
- Kalabhavan Mani as Soldier Basheer
- Vijayaraghavan as Captain Vijayan
- Laila as Serina, Jaffer Khan's Daughter and Gopinath's love interest
- Mukesh Rishi as Pakistan Army General Jaffer Khan
- Sai Kumar as Major Prabhakar
- Jagadish as Hav. Kurian
- Sadiq as Naik Haneefa
- Captain Raju as Brig. Nair
- Suresh Krishna as Maj. Rajendran, BSF officer (Cameo apperence)
- Indraja as Captain Hema Varma, Rajendran's sister and Sarath Chandran's fiancee
- Shivaji as Ex-Major Varma, Rajendran and Hema's uncle
- Manuraj as Soldier Prakashan
- Shruthi Raj as Shabana, Settu Pappa's grand daughter
- Hemanth Ravan as Col. Mushtaq Muhammed
- Machan Varghese as Naik Kunjunni
- Joju George as Santhosh, an Indian Soldier
- Mafia Sasi as Rasool, a Pakistan Soldier
- Charuhasan as Settu Pappa
- Major Ravi as Captain Iqbal
- Yamuna as Gopinath's mother
- Bindu Ramakrishnan as Maheswari, Rajendran and Hema's mother
- Ramya Sudha as Rajendran's wife
- Meena Ganesh as Basheer's mother
- Mangala as Rajendran and Hema's younger sister
- Kannur Sreelatha as Omana, Prabhakaran's wife
- Sanusha as Mini, Prabhakaran's daughter
- Radhika as Rukhiya, Serina's friend
- Sandra Amy as Alima, Serina's friend

== Production ==
Captain Raju had a major accident on the sets of this film.

== Release ==
=== Reception ===
A critic from Sify wrote that "There is not even one redeeming factor in this amateurishly shot film. The first half looks ancient. Dileep is wasted and Prabhu's dubbed voice is jarring. You run out of the hall while, the Pakistani general's daughter Laila holds the Indian flag and says, ”Bharat Mata Ki Jai”!!!" (transl. Hail Mother India!) Reviewing the Tamil dubbed version Kalam, Cinesouth wrote "The first half of the film proceeds like a documentary- pretty boring. Such Army based films ought to be serious, but this film doesn't have it. The team attempts to infiltrate Pakistan as if they are going for a picnic. Technical brilliance and wizardry is missing too".

=== Box office ===
This film was overall a box-office bomb.
