= En Mana Vaanil =

2002 film by Vinayan

- DVD cover
- Directed by: Vinayan
- Screenplay by: Vinayan
- Dialogue by: Gokula Krishnan
- Produced by: V. Ravichandran
- Starring: Jayasurya; Kavya Madhavan
- Cinematography: Utpal V Nayanar
- Edited by: G. Murali
- Music by: Ilaiyaraaja
- Production company: Aascar Films
- Release date: 12 September 2002
- Running time: 150 minutes
- Country: India
- Language: Tamil

En Mana Vaanil (transl. In the sky of my heart) is a 2002 Indian Tamil-language romantic drama film written and directed by Vinayan. It is a remake of his Malayalam film Oomappenninu Uriyadappayyan (2002). The film stars Jayasurya and Kavya Madhavan, reprising their roles from the original. Vadivelu and Vijayakumar appear in supporting roles.

== Plot ==
A poor mute man Ganesh and a rich deaf-mute girl Thilaka fall in love. Their love is supported by Ganesh's family but is opposed with a vengeance by Thilaka's family. At the same time, Thilaka is pursued by other suitors who are only after her money. Ganesh and Thilaka flee their hometown together, pursued by Thilaka's uncle and suitor. What happens next is the crux of the Story.

== Cast ==
- Jayasurya as Ganesh
- Kavya Madhavan as Thilaka
- Vadivelu as Govindan
- Chandrasekhar as a blind street singer
- Mansoor Ali Khan as Gajendran
- Vijayakumar as Rajarathnam, Thilaka's father
- Manivannan as Annamalai
- Rajeev as Parthasarathy
- Charle as Paramasivam
- Vaiyapuri as Azhagusundaram
- Thadi Balaji as Vikram Singh
- Sanjeev as Velu
- Ajay Rathnam as Police inspector
- Bava Lakshmanan as Nomad
- Kovai Sarala as Parvathi
- Sabitha Anand as Ganesh's mother
- Ramya
- Karthika Mathew as Sumathi, Ganesh's sister
- Deepu as Nomad
- Indrajith Sukumaran as Murali
- Anu Anand as Mahesh
- R. S. Shivaji
- Beena Sabu
- Vandar Kuzhazhi Smitha as Prostitute
- Shirley Das as Prostitute

== Production ==
En Mana Vaanil is a remake of the Malayalam film Oomappenninu Uriyadappayyan (2002). The same director Vinayan, lead actor Jayasurya and lead actress Kavya Madhavan returned for the remake. The film's first schedule was held in Pollachi and the second in Ooty.

== Soundtrack ==
The soundtrack was composed by Ilaiyaraaja. The song "Enna Solli" is set in Suddhadhanyasi raga.

Track listing
No.	Title	Lyrics	Singer(s)	Length
1.	"Enna Solli Paduvatho"	Palani Bharathi	Hariharan, Sadhana Sargam	4:55
2.	"Kuthu Kuthu"	Muthulingam	Karthik, Mano, Sujatha, Surendhar, Harish Rahavendra	4:28
3.	"Roatoram"	Mu. Metha	K. J. Yesudas, Shruti Haasan	5:02
4.	"Unnai Kannum Pothu"	Palani Bharathi	Hariharan, Karthik	5:54
5.	"Unnai Thedi"	Palani Bharathi	Hariharan	5:04
6.	"Unnai Thedi" (reprise)	Palani Bharathi	Ilaiyaraaja	5:04
7.	"Vayasu Vantha"	Palani Bharathi	Napoleon, Biju, S. N. Surendar, Swarna Latha	4:47
8.	"Muthu Muthu"	Palani Bharathi	Karthik, Bhavatharini	5:07
Total length:				40:21

== Reception ==
Sify called it "the most idiotic and lamebrain film made in recent times"; however the critic noted "The silver lining on the otherwise intolerable film is the melodious songs tuned by Illayaraja". Malathi Rangarajan of The Hindu wrote, "Too much of mental and physical trauma on screen could only leave the viewer weary and exasperated". Visual Dasan of Kalki called it the age old story of lovers on the run but praised Ilaiyaraaja's background score and Jayasurya's acting. Malini Mannath of Chennai Online wrote "Just that the director has made his protagonists mutes, the girl being additionally deaf. So while one commends the director for his daring in making his lead players not utter a single word in the film, one cannot but notice that the rest is routine stuff".
