= Karumadikkuttan (film) =

1999 film by Vinayan

- CD Cover
- Directed by: vinayan
- Screenplay by: J. Pallasserry
- Story by: Vinayan; J. Pallasserry
- Produced by: Samson J Panadan
- Starring: Kalabhavan Mani; Nandini; Suresh Krishna; Rajan P.Dev; Janardhanan
- Cinematography: Alagappan N.
- Edited by: G. Murali
- Music by: Mohan Sithara
- Production company: Surabhi Cinema
- Distributed by: Surabhi Cinema
- Release date: 30 March 2001
- Country: India
- Language: Malayalam

Karumadikkuttan is a 2001 Indian Malayalam-language drama film directed by Vinayan and written by J. Pallasserry, starring Kalabhavan Mani, Kausalya, Rajan P. Dev and Suresh Krishna in lead. This film was later remade in tamil as Azhagesan .The film also has Bharathi, Janardhanan, Sai Kumar Ganesh, Athira, Priyanka and Meena Ganesh in the cast.

The film features a soundtrack by Mohan Sithara, cinematography by Azhagappan, and editing by G. Murali. It is produced and distributed by Samson J. Paanaadan of Surabhi Cinema. The film was a commercial success at the box office. The film was remade in Tamil as Azhagesan (2004) starring Sathyaraj and Prema and in Telugu as Konaseemalo Chittemma Kittayya starring Alla Rambabu and Gurleen Chopra, which remains unreleased.

== Plot ==
The protagonist of the film, Kuttan, is a 30-year-old man with the intelligence of a 10-year-old child. People call him Karumadi. Everyone has affection for him, and he too is always ready to do anything for anybody in the village. The remuneration that he gets for any job somehow is never above five rupees. But he works really hard when he is terribly hungry just for the sake of this meagre amount. And he has no complaints against anybody. People even ridicule him. But he thinks only of the positive aspects of things and has no grudge against anybody. He is in love with his cousin Nandini, a college student. Neelakandan is the village landlord who is a cunning man and has grabbed all the wealth from Nandini's father a few years back. Neelakandan has a son Sekhar, who is a womanizer.

Nandini and her college professor fell in love with each other. He proposes to marry her, and she accepts. Sekhar, who has an eye on Nandini, is humiliated and slapped by Nandini while he tries to misbehave with her. As a means of revenge, Sekhar kicks Nandini and her grandmother out of their house. Nandini's marriage is immediately stopped, and her grandmother falls ill.

Kuttan accommodates them in his small house. Later, Nandini's grandmother dies, and Nandini is raped by Sekhar. Nandini gets pregnant but aborts with Neelakandan's daughter's support. Neelakandan wants to take Nandini to his house and marry Sekhar, but she refuses, and Kuttan humiliates Neelakandan. Sekhar decides to kill Kuttan. First, he kills Kuttan's family friend Govindan Nair. In the meantime, Neelakandan dies because of his illness. Sekhar's henchmen beat Kuttan, and Nandini kills Sekhar.

A few years later, Nandini is released from jail and lives happily with Kuttan.

== Cast ==
- Kalabhavan Mani as Karumadikkuttan / Kuttan
- Nandini as Nandini / Nandinikutty
- Rajan P. Dev as Neelakantan Muthalali; Shekharan's father
- Suresh Krishna as Shekharan (Voiceover by Saikumar)
- Bharathi Vishnuvardhan as Kuttan & Nandini's Grandmother
- Janardhanan as Govindhan Nair
- Mala Aravindan as Aashan
- Athira as Athira, Neelakantan's daughter
- Sai Kumar as Nandini's Father
- K. B. Ganesh Kumar as Chandramohan Mash
- Shivaji
- Priyanka Anoop
- Meena Ganesh
- Ponnamma Babu

== Production ==
The film's was shot from Kuttanad, Kerala. About the film, Vinayan says: "We never try to look into the minds and sorrows of the mentally ill people around us. They too long for love. And love, when given to them could take them to heights. That's what I am trying to tell in this film." About his character, Kalabhavan Mani says: "I have done my best to give life to the character of a mentally ill person. I have observed the mannerisms of mentally ill people and have performed accordingly."

== Soundtrack ==
The film's soundtrack contains 12 songs, all composed by Mohan Sithara, with lyrics by Yusufali Kechery.

#	Title	Singer(s)	Raga(s)
1	"Chelulla"	K. S. Chitra	Shahana
2	"Chelulla Vallathil"	K. S. Chitra, P. Jayachandran	Shahana
3	"Innalekal"	K. J. Yesudas	
4	"Kaa Kaa Kakakarumbi"	Kalabhavan Mani	
5	"Kai Kottu Penne"	Kalabhavan Mani	
6	"Kannezhuthi Pottuthottu [F]"	K. S. Chitra	
7	"Nenjudukkinte"	K. J. Yesudas	
8	"Odivarum Ormma"	K. J. Yesudas	
9	"Sahyasaanu Shruthicherthu"	K. J. Yesudas	Desh
10	"Thaalam Thaalam"	K. J. Yesudas	
11	"Va Va Thaamarappenne"	M. G. Sreekumar, Chorus	
12	"Yaahi Radhe"	K. S. Chitra	

== Box office ==
The film was both critical and commercial success. The film was released alongside Kakkakuyil and Meghasandesham.
