= Kunjikuruvi =

- Directed by: Vinayan
- Starring: Nedumudi Venu; Geetha
- Music by: Mohan Sithara
- Production company: Vasantha Films
- Distributed by: Vasantha Films
- Release date: 21 August 1992
- Country: India
- Language: Malayalam

Kunjikuruvi ( Ammayude Swantham Kunju Mary ) is a 1992 Indian Malayalam film, directed by Vinayan. The film stars Nedumudi Venu and Geetha in lead roles. The film had musical score by Mohan Sithara.

== Cast ==
- Nedumudi Venu
- Geetha
- Madhu as Father Francis
- Usha as Jessy

== Soundtrack ==
Bichu Thirumala wrote all the lyrics.

- "Olakayil Tullum" – KJ Yesudas, KS Chithra
- "Outer Hedge Moha" – KS Chithra
