= Kalyana Sougandhikam (1996 film) =

Kalyana Sowgandhikam
- Directed by: Vinayan
- Written by: J. Pallassery; V. C. Ashok
- Produced by: Kasim Vengola
- Starring: Dileep; Jagadish; Divya Unni; Captain Raju; Jagathy Sreekumar
- Cinematography: Vipin Mohan
- Edited by: G. Murali
- Music by: Johnson
- Release date: 18 October 1996
- Running time: 138 minutes
- Country: India
- Language: Malayalam

Kalyana Sowgandhikam (transl. White garland-lily) is a 1996 Indian Malayalam-language comedy drama film directed by Vinayan and starring Dileep and Divya Unni. It is the debut movie of Divya Unni as a lead actress.

== Plot ==
Jayadeva Sharma hails from an aristocratic Brahmin family. However, his family's fortunes disappear as his parents die, and he is fostered by a goldsmith. Eventually, he is betrayed by his friend, Ananthapadmanabhan, a man who he thinks is Aathira's boyfriend. To get his money back, he disguises himself as a sage with the help of his friends, Hariprasad, Bahuleyan, and Premadasan and gets into the house of Aathira's grandfather, Kunnamanagalam Neelakantan Vaidyar, as a guest.

Jayadevan and Aathira's friendship blooms after he saves her from Balagopalan, who is a cousin of her. Premadasan ends up falling in love with Vasumathi who is also a cousin of Aathira. Near the climax on Aathira's wedding day, Jayadevan is held hostage by Ananthapadmanabhan and is saved by Premadasan. In the end, Aathira's fiancé is caught, and Aathira and Jayadevan unite.

== Cast ==
- Dileep as Mullassery Manakkal Jayadeva Sharma / Jayadevan / Jayadevananda Swamikal
- Divya Unni as Athira, Jayadevan's love interest
- Jagadish as Premadasan / Preman, Jayadevan's friend
- Jagathi Sreekumar as Mambally Vasudevan, Athira's uncle (voice by Ramesh Kurumassery)
- Kalabhavan Mani as Balagopalan / Balan, Athira's fiancé
- Captain Raju as Kunnamangalam Neelakantan Vaidyar, Athira's grandfather
- Chippy as Vasumathi, Premadasan's lover
- K. P. A. C. Lalitha as Subhadra, Neelakantan Vaidyar's wife and Athira's grandmother
- Harisree Asokan as Bahuleyan, Premadasan and Jayadevan's friend
- Indrans as Krishnankutty a.k.a. Shahanshah, Balagopalan's assistant
- Zainuddin as Hariprasad / Hari, Premadasan and Jayadevan's friend
- Kamal Roy as Ananthapadmanabhan / Ananthan
- Oduvil Unnikrishnan as Murukeshan Thattan, Jayadevan's father
- Sadiq as Raghavan
- Shivaji as Bhargavan, Raghavan's brother
- Meena Ganesh as Murukeshan's Wife and Jayadevan's mother
- M. Renjith as Goonda

== Soundtrack ==
- "Gopala Hridayam Paadunna" - K. J. Yesudas
- "Kalyana Sowgandhikam"-K. S Chithra
