= Kausthubham =

- Kasthubham poster
- Directed by: Sajeev Kilikulam
- Produced by: Sandeep Nair
- Starring: Karthika; Vijayaraghavan
- Music by: Anil Pongumoodu
- Release date: 19 March 2010
- Country: India
- Language: Malayalam

Kausthubham is a 2010 Malayalam-language movie by Sajeev Kilikulam starring Karthika and Vijayaraghavan.

== Plot ==
The film is the story of Yamuna whose life is filled with worries and sorrows. Her husband is sent to jail on a false count of murder. Her three-year-old son gets lost during a temple festival and that increases her problems. She prays to Lord Krishna and once the lord appears miraculous things take place.

== Cast ==
- Vijayaraghavan
- Master Saikumar
- Karthika Yamuna
- Jagannatha Varma
- Sukumari
- Indrans
- Jagadeesh
- Rajmohan Unnithan
- Vijayaraghavan
- Ayyappa Baiju
- Mamukkoya
- Kochu Preman
- Anoop Chandran
- paramesharan{ master}
- gayathri
