= Athisayan =

2007 film by Vinayan

Athishayan
- DVD cover
- Directed by: Vinayan
- Written by: Vinayan
- Produced by: Gokulam Gopalan
- Starring: Master Devadas
- Cinematography: Raaja Ratnam
- Edited by: G. Murali
- Music by: Alphonse Joseph
- Production company: Sree Gokulam Movies
- Distributed by: Sree Gokulam Release
- Release date: 17 April 2007
- Running time: 135 minutes
- Country: India
- Language: Malayalam

Athishayan (transl. The Astounded) is a 2007 Indian Malayalam-language science fiction monster film written and directed by Vinayan, starring Master Devadas with Jackie Shroff (in his Malayalam film debut), Jayasurya, Mukesh, Kavya Madhavan and Karthika in other roles. The film is inspired from the 2003 film Hulk. In the film, Devan is an orphan raised by Maya, an investigative journalist. When she is abducted before she can expose a high-profile group of criminals, Devan consumes an invisibility potion to save her but he is unaware of its side effects.

== Plot ==
Maya, a young television reporter, works for New India Television. Radharamanan, the managing director of the channel, has a fascination for Maya, who was brought up in an orphanage by Father Chanthakkadan. Maya takes up the responsibility of bringing up a few orphans whom she has picked up from the streets. One of these kids is Devan, who is sort of a child prodigy, with a computer-like mind and very good in studies and extra-curricular activities. R. C. Shekhar, a scientist, lives very close their house, with his servant Damodaran. He is working on a project, which could help in making human beings invisible. On the very day that he successfully experiments with his 'magic' potion on a rabbit, which Devan watches. After the experiment, he is urgently called to the U.S. as his daughter Sunitha, who is studying there, meets with an accident.

Meanwhile, Maya's boyfriend Roy, also a journalist, is in jail after he is framed in a murder case of a young woman Shahina by some influential politicians, including the State Revenue Minister Divakaran, another minister Yunus Kunju, the Commissioner Shanmughan and the very influential Kuwait Nazar. With the help of the newly appointed Collector Anita Williams, Maya shoots a video of these baddies accepting millions of rupees as commission from some Arab businessmen, who are there to sign some business deals with the State Government.

Maya immediately goes to Radharamanan and shows him the clip. Radharamanan is thrilled and agrees to telecast it, after discussing it with the board of directors. Somehow Nazar, Divakaran and others come to know of this and they go after Maya, to get from her the memory card containing the clipping. On the very same day that R. C. Shekhar goes to the U.S., Maya is kidnapped by Nazar and his henchmen. The kids are baffled. Anita Williams, Father Chanthakkadan and Radharamanan know who are behind this, but nothing can be done without sufficient evidence. And then Devan sneaks into Shekhar's lab and drinks the potion. He becomes invisible and sets out to save Maya.

He successfully saves Maya but he loses the memory card. Radharamanan and Maya releases Roy on bail with Devan's help. Angrily Nazar kidnaps Roy and kills him with Yunus's help. Meanwhile, Shekhar comes back from U.S. and plans to make Devan visible. Devan then retrieves the memory card which was in his pockets and hands it over to Radharamanan. But Nazar's henchmen Johnny and his other men try to take it from Radharamanan but he refuses to give it. A fight occurs between, Radharamanan and Nazar's henchmen. Shekhar sees this and saves Radharamanan from them. Nazar and Yunus arrive there and try to take the memory card but fails. Radharamanan goes to telecast the clip. When Yunus tries to shoot him, Devan comes in between and gets shot. Due to the potion, he gets saved, but as a side effect of getting shot (which Shekhar warns no metallic objects should make a scratch on him), he mutates into an aggressive giant and a monster and kills everyone who have done wrong to him and his family, during which he saves a child. Shekhar couldn't save him. After killing the baddies, Devan leaves Maya and the children and makes his abode in the deep ocean, with an end note saying that "to fight for the Justice, Devan will come back as Athisayan".

== Cast ==
- Master Devadas as Devan (Athisayan)
- Jackie Shroff as R. C. Shekhar
- Jayasurya as Roy Joseph
- Mukesh as Radharamanan
- Kavya Madhavan as Maya
- Karthika as District Collector Anitha Williams
- Jagadish as Koshy
- Thilakan as Ramanathan
- Baby Nayanthara as Kingini
- Harisree Ashokan as 'Einstein' Damodaran
- Guinness Pakru as Ramu
- Indrans as Swami
- Devan as Kuwait Nazar
- Ramu as Minister Yunus Kunju
- Rajan P. Dev as Minister Divakaran
- Baburaj as Parunthu Johnny
- Tini Tom as Jamal
- Bheeman Raghu as Commissioner Shanmughan IPS
- Mala Aravindan as Sessions Judge Rama Moorthy
- Augustine as Public Prosecutor Joy Manjooran
- Sadiq as ACP Sathyanathan IPS
- Mafia Sasi as Hassan Mustafa
- Chali Pala as CI Balagopal
- Gagandeep Virk as Police Officer Ananthan
- N. L. Balakrishnan as Manthravadi
- Lakshmi Priya as Shahidha, Kingini's mother
- Usha as Susie, Koshi's wife
- Ponnamma Babu

== Production ==
Devadas was cast in the film because the film's producer was his father's friend. This was the first film he shot for although Anandabhairavi was released first. The shooting of the film was in Kerala, mainly in locations in Aluva and Ernakulam. The film was high on special effects, visual effects and 2D Animation. These special effects of Athisayan were done at EFX, Chennai. Bollywood actor Jackie Shroff plays a scientist in this film, which marks his Malayalam debut.

== Soundtrack ==
Athisayan

Soundtrack album by Alphonse Joseph
- Released: 2007
- Recorded: Satyam Audios
- Genre: World Music
- Label: Satyam Audios
- Producer: Sree Gokulam Movies

The music of Athisayan is by Alphonse Joseph. The lyrics are written by Vinayan and Vayalar Sarath Chandra Varma. The film has four songs. The singers are Vineeth Sreenivasan, Rimi Tomy, Vidhu Prathap, Balu, Karthik and Sithara. Sithara was debuted through this film.

| Track # | Song | Singer(s) |
|---|---|---|
| 1 | "Aluva Manappurathe" ("Pammi Pammi Vanne") | Sithara |
| 2 | "Ennomale" | Vineeth Sreenivasan, Rimi Tomy |
| 3 | "Neeyennomal" | Karthik |
| 4 | "Athishayan (Kuttappanmaaraya)" | Vidhu Prathap, Balu |

== Release and reception ==
Athisayan was released in Kerala during the summer vacation, on 17 April 2007, mainly aiming at children.

A critic from Sify wrote that the film "defies all logic and is a hotch potch of various films. At best it provides some fun for the kids, however the graphic work in the film is tacky, making it difficult to watch the long drawn out climax scenes [...] A battalion of comedians and kids provide some relief. Master Devadas's ability to play his characters wit and melancholy keeps the film going".

The Hindi dubbed version of the film, titled Naya Ajooba, was released in 2009.

== See also ==
- Science fiction film of India
- List of Indian superhero films
