= Mayaponman =

- Poster
- Directed by: Thulasidas
- Written by: J. Pallassery
- Produced by: V. V. Antony; P. A. Velayudhan; P. C.Aleyas
- Starring: Dileep; Kalabhavan Mani; Mohini; Jagathy Sreekumar
- Cinematography: Venugopal
- Edited by: G. Murali
- Music by: Berny-Ignatius
- Production company: King Star Productions
- Distributed by: Seven Star Release
- Release date: 12 September 1997
- Running time: 130 min
- Country: India
- Language: Malayalam

Mayaponman (transl. Mystic Kingfisher) is a 1997 Indian Malayalam-language film directed by Thulasidas. It had Dileep, Kalabhavan Mani and Mohini. The film was produced by V. V. Antony, P. A. Velayudhan and P. C. Ealias under the banner of King Star Productions and was distributed by Seven Star Release. The story, script and dialogues were by J. Pallassery. The plot is loosely based on the 1987 American romantic comedy film Overboard.

== Cast ==
- Dileep as Prasad
- Mohini as Nandinikkutty / Indu
- Kalabhavan Mani as Charlie Lopez
- Jagathy Sreekumar as SI Babu C. Kuruvila
- Kuthiravattam Pappu as Motor Doctor Mathai
- Oduvil Unnikrishnan as Adv. Paulos Manavalan
- Kumarakam Raghunath as Rajendran
- Cochin Haneefa as Pattalam Vasu
- Machan Varghese as Vasu's assistant
- Jagannatha Varma as Father Antony
- Shivaji as Cheriyammavan
- Kanakalatha as Devaki Kunjamma/ Younger Aunt
- Darshana
- Kalpana as Meenakshi
- Cherthala Lalitha as Karthiyayini Kunjamma/ Elder Aunt

== Box office ==
The film was commercial success.

== Soundtrack ==
The songs were composed by Mohan Sithara and lyrics were written by S. Ramesan Nair

Mayaponman

Soundtrack album by Mohan Sithara
- Released: 6 May 1997
- Recorded: 1997
- Genre: Malayalam Film Music
- Language: Malayalam
- Label: Thomson Audios

=== Original ===
Mayaponman
No.	Title	Lyrics	Singer(s)	Length
1.	"Ammanam Chemmanam, Version 1"	S. Ramesan Nair	Biju Narayanan & K.S. Chithra	05:30
2.	"Kathirolathumbi, Version 1"	S. Ramesan Nair	M.G. Sreekumar & K.S. Chithra	04:50
3.	"Aariro Mayangu Nee"	S. Ramesan Nair	Biju Narayanan	05:43
4.	"Ammanam Chemmanam, Version 2"	S. Ramesan Nair	K.S. Chithra	05:30
5.	"Chandanathin Gandhamolum"	S. Ramesan Nair	Srinivas
6.	"Nimishadalangalil Nee"	S. Ramesan Nair	Sujatha Mohan
7.	"Kathirolathumbi, Version 2"	S. Rameshan Nair	K.S. Chithra	04:50
