= Sipayi Lahala =

- Poster
- Directed by: Vinayan
- Screenplay by: Sreenivasan
- Story by: Vinayan
- Produced by: Kozhikode unni
- Starring: Mukesh; Sreenivasan; Vani Viswanath; Nirosha; Vijayaraghavan
- Cinematography: Venu
- Edited by: G. Murali
- Music by: S. P. Venkatesh
- Release date: 1995
- Country: India
- Language: Malayalam

Sipayi Lahala (transl. Sepoy Mutiny) is an Indian Malayalam-language black comedy film directed by Vinayan and written by Sreenivasan from a story by Vinayan in 1995 . It stars Mukesh, Vani Viswanath, Sreenivasan, Nirosha and Vijayaraghavan. The film was a commercial success.

== Plot ==
Rajendran is portrayed as a peon in Brittoli company. Its Managing Director Ramanathan is a pompous womanizer. Accountant Appukkuttan Menon is his close friend and trusted advisor.

Rajendran, with the help of Appukkuttan, pretends to be the manager so that his love interest Radhika's parents would agree to their marriage. Appukkuttan convinces Ramanathan that he can have Radhika if he lets Rajendran be the manager. Ramanathan wants to meet Rajendran's wife, and he arranges a reception meanwhile Appukutan arranges a girl Sajitha to act as Rajendran's wife for the reception. During the reception, Rajendran is asked to sing while Ramanathan tries to romance Rajendran's wife and asks Appukuttan to take her to his room. After the party, Rajendran and Appukuttan return to their home. They tell the pimp to girl from the reception area. The pimp comes out of the reception area with Sajitha but a van of thugs block the cab and kidnap Sajitha.

Next day, the pimp comes back to Appukutan and Rajendran for help to find Sajitha. Both of them say that they have paid the money and their roles are over but the pimp should find Sajitha himself. Police arrives at Brittoli office and takes Appukuttan to the police station. Appukuttan claims he does not know of the Sajitha's present situation and is released for the moment. He returns home and tells Rajendran about the police enquiry and they both plan to leave the area. Rajendran's mother and Radhika, comes to their house. Appukuttan tries to run away, but Rajendran locks Appukutan in a room. Appukuttan escapes from the room and disappears.

Sajitha father, Varma, comes in search of her. Varma demands that Rajendran find Sajitha within twenty four hours. Rajendran finally gets Appukuttan and they both go for shopping with Radhika, who is saddened by Rajendran's behaviour. At the shopping area, Ramanathan sees Radhika, who is now alone with Appukuttan after Rajendran hides, seeing Ramanathan coming. Ramanathan asks Appukuttan about Radhika, and Appukuttan replies vaguely. Appukuttan and Rajendran go to Ramanathan's house and say that Cleopatra would release an attack on Brittoli. Hearing this, Ramanathan goes with thugs to Varma's area, but Varma's people beat Ramanathan and his gang.

Varma's wife comes to Rajendran's house and tells Rajendran that Sajitha is not in fact Varma's daughter but Varma wanted to make money by showing her and she would commit suicide if she does not come back after "marrying" Rajendran. Rajendran proclaims his innocence and the lady leaves crying. Rajendran phones Varma and scolds him. Rajendran sees Radhika crying. Radhika tells him she went to Varma's house to see the lady and she knows Rajendran is a bad person with many wives. Radhika takes her bag and walks away with Rajendran following her, but a gang kidnaps Radhika. Rajendran saddened by this development, goes to Ramanathan's guest house and finds Sajitha. Rajendran calls Varma to come to the guesthouse.

Varma with his thugs come and fight with Ramanathan, Appukuttan and Rajendran. The fight ends and Ramanathan tells that on the reception night itself, Sajitha revealed that she was not his wife and is beaten as punishment. Radhika was kidnapped by Ramanathan. Radhika goes with Appukuttan and Rajendran. While walking, Rajendran tells Radhika that he did all this to marry her to which Radhika says it would have been better if he had not lied. The film ends with Rajendran back in a peon's dress.

== Cast ==
- Mukesh as Brittoli Rajendran
- Sreenivasan as Appukkuttan Menon, Rajendran's friend
- Vijayaraghavan as Managing Director Ramanathan, Rajendran and Appukuttan's friend
- Vani Viswanath as Radhika, Rajendran's love interest and wife
- Nirosha as Sajitha, drama artist
- K. P. A. C. Lalitha as Radhika's mother
- Oduvil Unnikrishnan as Radhika's father
- Sadiq as planter Ravi
- N. F. Varghese as Varma
- Zeenath as Rajendran's mother
- Kunchan as Narayanan
- Kanakalatha as Thankamma
- Spadikam George as Sub Inspector
- Poornima Indrajith as Rajani, office staff
- Sonia Baiju Kottarakara as Nancy

== Soundtrack ==
The film includes songs composed by S. P. Venkitesh, with lyrics by Gireesh Puthenchery.

Track	Title	Singer(s)	Notes
1	"Mangala Deepam Thiri Theliyum"	K. J. Yesudas, K. S. Chitra	Composer: S. P. Venkitesh
2	"Oru Ponkinaavinte"	Biju Narayanan	Composer: S. P. Venkitesh

== Reception ==
On 13 October 2018, Aradhya Kurup of The News Minute, wrote, "In Vinayan's Sipayi Lahala, Mukesh plays a peon, who agrees to the demands of his womanizing boss to “allow” his wife to sleep with him for a promotion. Though Mukesh does hire a drama artist to play his wife to fool his boss, the exploitation invariably happens, and it's masterminded by the hero. A relevant issue that gets a dumbed down narrative.
