= Independence (1999 film) =

1999 film directed by Vinayan

- Directed by: Vinayan
- Written by: V. C. Ashok
- Produced by: Jeevanandan for Gurubavan Vision
- Starring: Vani Viswanath; Indraja; Kalabhavan Mani; Khushbu
- Cinematography: Uthpal V. Nayanar
- Edited by: G. Murali
- Music by: songs Suresh Peters; Background score C. Rajamani
- Release date: 15 October 1999
- Country: India
- Language: Malayalam
- Box office: ₹6.5 crore

Independence is a 1999 Indian Malayalam-language fantasy masala film directed by Vinayan and written by V. C. Ashok from a story by Vinayan. It stars Vani Viswanath, Khushbu, Kalabhavan Mani and Indraja.

== Cast ==
- Vani Viswanath as Indu Varma (Voice-over by Bhagyalakshmi)
- Indraja as Sindhu Varma, Indu's Sister (Voice-over by Sreeja Ravi)
- Khushbu as City Police Commissioner Sreedevi IPS (Voice-over by Ambili)
- Kalabhavan Mani as Munna
- Vijayaraghavan in a dual role as
  - Sub Collector Raveendran IAS, Sreedevi's Husband
  - Sinkaramuthu, Lorry Driver
- Captain Raju as Badabhai
- Cochin Haneefa as Balachandra Kammath / Balu
- Rajan P. Dev as Mukundan
- Jagathy Sreekumar as C.I. Manmadhan Potty, SI
- Sadiq as Govindan
- Krishna as Kithu, Mukundan's Son
- Zainuddin as Surendran, Head Constable
- Spadikam George as Inspector General Anand Shah
- Innocent as Mythrayan MA Malayalam
- Murali as "Naxalite" Kunikal Vasu
- Sai Kumar as Chief Minister Raghavan
- Siddique as Prabhakara Varma Thampuran, Indu and Sindhu's Father
- Bindu Nair as Parvathi Bhai Thampuratti, Indu and Sindhu's Mother
- Shivaji Malayalam actor as Rtd. DIG Mahadeva Kaimal
- Sukumari as Pappamma
- Manka Mahesh as Sarojananda Swamiji Amma
- K. T. S. Padannayil as Madhavan Master
- Kanya
- Machan Varghese
- Joju George
- Job Pottas as Neurologist

== Soundtrack ==
All lyrics are written by S. Ramesan Nair; all music is composed by Suresh Peters.

No.	Title	Artist(s)	Length
1.	"Nandalaala"	Swarnalatha, Choir
2.	"Amme Mangala Devi Hare"	Choir
3.	"Daaha Veenjin Paana Paathrame" (Duet)	K. J. Yesudas, Sangeetha Gopakumar
4.	"Daaha Veenjin Paana Paathrame" (Female)	Sangeetha Gopakumar
5.	"Daaha Veenjin Paana Paathrame" (Male)	K. J. Yesudas
6.	"Kanikaanum"	Sangeetha Gopakumar
7.	"Oru Deepam Kaanan"	M. G. Sreekumar, K. L. Sreeram, Sangeethaa-Sangeetha Sajith
8.	"Oru Mutham Thedi Doore Poyi"	M. G. Sreekumar, Sujatha Mohan, Mano

== Box office ==
The film was box office hit earned around ₹ 6.50 Crores.
