= Breaking News Live =

- Directed by: Sudhir Ambalapadu
- Screenplay by: G. Kishore
- Produced by: Ranjith Kumar
- Starring: Kavya Madhavan; Vineeth; Mythili; Mamukkoya
- Cinematography: Murali Krishnan
- Music by: Mohan Sitara
- Production company: News Value Productions
- Distributed by: ITL Release
- Release date: 15 February 2013
- Country: India
- Language: Malayalam
- Box office: ₹29 lakh (US$30,000)

Breaking News Live is a 2013 indian Malayalam film directed by Sudhir Ambalapadu and starring Kavya Madhavan and Mythili in the lead roles.

== Plot ==
'Breaking News Live' visualizes the story of Nayana and Sneha. The plot moves forward with the people Nayana comes across in her life. She realizes the other side of people when she finds their true self. Sneha and her mentally challenged brother are under the care of their grandmother after the death of their parents. When fate makes Nayana meet Sneha, the former feels that Sneha is a part of her life. The revelation that they are not two but one takes the story to novel planes.

Kavya Madhavan and Mythili do the roles of Nayana and Sneha respectively. Vineeth also plays an important role as the trainer of Nayana, a hotel management student. Devan and Urmilla Unni play the characters of Nayana's parents, and Sukumari is the grandmother of Sneha. New face Rajeesh acts as Sneha's brother.

== Cast ==
- Kavya Madhavan as Nayana
- Vineeth as Deepak
- Mythili as Sneha
- Mamukkoya as Beeran Koya
- Sukumari as Sneha's grandmother (Madhavi)
- Thilakan
- Devan
- Lakshmi Sharma
- Anoop Chandran as Auto Driver Sunny
- Subi Suresh as Rosakutty
- Sadhika
- Thesni Khan as Suhara
- Thalaivasal Vijay as Advocate Surendra Menon
- Naveen R Mohan as Anparashan
