= Daivathinte Makan =

2000 Indian film

- VCD cover
- Directed by: Vinayan
- Written by: J. Pallassery; V. C. Ashok
- Produced by: Vindhyan
- Starring: Jayaram; Prema; Pooja Batra; Jagathy Sreekumar; Kalabhavan Mani
- Cinematography: Saloo George
- Edited by: G. Murali
- Music by: Vidyasagar; Rajamani (Score)
- Distributed by: Swargachithra
- Release date: 5 May 2000
- Country: India
- Language: Malayalam

Daivathinte Makan (transl. Son of God) is a 2000 Indian Malayalam-language action comedy film directed by Vinayan. It stars Jayaram, Prema, and Pooja Batra. The film was released in 2000.

== Plot ==
Sunny, an orphan, and Sonia, a rich heiress, fall in love and wish to get married. However, her father opposes this union due to the difference in their financial and social status.

== Cast ==
- Jayaram as Sunny / Sunnychan
- Pooja Batra as Soniya, Sunny's Love Interest
- Prema as Anjali
- Jagathy Sreekumar as Thalassery Kunjambu, Sunny's Friend
- Kalabhavan Mani as Eeshwar, Sunny's Friend
- Rajan P. Dev as Aanakkaran Avarachan, Soniya's father
- Janardhanan as Fr. Gabriel
- Hemanth Ravan as Rathan Bhai
- Sai Kumar as Peter
- Oduvil Unnikrishnan as Dr. Stephen
- Augustine as Muthuswamy
- Sadiq as Ananthan
- Riyaz as Deepak, Anjali's Husband
- Kollam Ajith as Police Constable Ponnappan
- Subair as Babu, Rathan Bhai's Friend
- Sumithra as Anjali's Mother
- Shivaji as Karthikeyan, Anjali's Stepfather
- Ponnamma Babu as Soniya's Mother
- Manka Mahesh as Subhadramma
- Priyanka Anoop as Malathi

== Box office ==
The film was a success.
