= Bhakthajanangalude Sradhakku =

2011 Indian Malayalam-language film

- Film poster
- Directed by: Priyanandanan
- Screenplay by: Manoj
- Story by: Ranjith
- Produced by: Jahangir Shamz
- Starring: Kavya Madhavan; Irshad
- Cinematography: Pratap P. Nair
- Edited by: Venugopal
- Music by: Natesh Sankar
- Production companies: Like Pictures; Xarfnet Movies
- Distributed by: Like Release
- Release date: 29 April 2011
- Country: India
- Language: Malayalam

Bhakthajanangalude Sradhakku (transl. Attention devotees) is a 2011 Indian Malayalam-language drama film directed by Priyanandanan and written by Manoj from a story by Ranjith. It stars Kavya Madhavan and Irshad. The film narrates the story of a self-declared demigod and her alcoholic husband. It is reportedly inspired from the life of the controversial godwoman Divya Joshi. The movie was produced by Jahangir Shamz under the banner of Xarfnet Movies.

== Cast ==
- Kavya Madhavan as Sumangala
- Irshad as Viswanathan
- Vanitha Krishnachandran as Saradha
- Kalabhavan Mani as Ammavan
- Jagadeesh
- Salim Kumar
- Geetha Vijayan
- Jayashree Sivadhas as Sumangala's Daughter
- Sadiq
- Augustine
- Indrans
- Jijoy Rajagopal

== Soundtrack ==
The film's soundtrack was composed by Natesh Shankar, with lyrics penned by Mullanezhi, Jayakumar Chengamanadu, and Rafeeq Ahamed.

Soundtrack Album
| # | Song | Singers |
|---|---|---|
| 1 | "Aadi Gurunaadhe" | Vidyadharan, Chorus |
| 2 | "Enikkoru" | K. J. Yesudas |
| 3 | "Enikkoru Nilaavinte" | K. S. Chithra |
| 4 | "Punnaaka Kompathu" (D) | P. Jayachandran, Sujatha Mohan |
| 5 | "Punnaaka Kompathu" (F) | Sujatha Mohan |
| 6 | "Punnaaka Kompathu" (M) | P. Jayachandran |

== Production ==
Priyanandan announced the film soon after his Prithviraj Sukumaran-Kavya Madhavan starrer Mandarappoovalla got shelved. The songs recorded for Mandarappoovalla are used in this film. The film was shot at various parts of Kannur.
