= Payum Puli =

Paayum Puli
- Directed by: Mohan Kupleri
- Written by: Biju Devassi
- Starring: Kalabhavan Mani; Rambha
- Cinematography: Sree Shankar
- Edited by: Pc Mohanan
- Music by: Mohan Sithara; Girish Puthenchery; Rajeev Alunkal
- Production company: Kingdom Movies
- Release date: 10 April 2007
- Country: India
- Language: Malayalam

Paayum Puli (transl. Pouncing Tiger) is a 2007 Indian Malayalam-language action comedy film directed by Mohan Kupleri, starring Kalabhavan Mani and Rambha.

== Cast ==
- Kalabhavan Mani as Saravanan
- Rambha as Mallika
- Sai Kumar as Josettan alias Jose
- Jagathy Sreekumar as Thankappan
- Jagadish as SI Sreenivasan
- Shobha Mohan as Ravishankar's mother
- Sukumari as Malli's grandmother
- Ambika Mohan as Susie, Nainan Finance MD
- Rajesh Hebbar as Rajan Menon
- Nimisha Suresh as Maya, Malli's sister
- Chandra Lakshman as Moosa Bhai's daughter
- TG Ravi as Moosa Bhai
- Riyaz Khan as Issac John
- Bheeman Raghu as ACP Ramanathan IPS
- Ponnambalam as Pandian
- Sadiq as Advocate Subhash
- Anand as Ravishankar
- Jagannatha Varma as Warrier, Malli's grandfather
- Salim Kumar as Mujeeb Rahman
- Majeed as Ex MLA Mathai
- Munshi Venu as Old man at Mucheetkali
- Nisha Sarang as Rukmini
- Gayathri as Ramanathan's wife

== Reception ==
Sify wrote, "Payum Puli is racy and has enough masalas to please the common man who is looking for time pass entertainment".

== Soundtrack ==
The music was composed by Mohan Sithara and lyrics was written by Girish Puthenchery and Rajeev Alunkal.
