= J. Pallassery =

Film script writer and actor

- Born: Aluva
- Occupation: scriptwriter
- Years active: 1990 – present

Joy Pallassery aka. J.Pallassery is an Indian film scriptwriter and actor in Malayalam movies. He did story, screenplay and dialogue for more than 50 Malayalam movies. He has also acted in many movies and teleserial.

== Filmography ==
=== Dialogue ===
- Santhwanam(1991)
- Mukha Chithram (1991)
- Mukhamudra (1992)
- Ponnaramthottathe Raajaavu (1992)
- Snehasaagaram (1992)
- Addeham Enna Iddeham (1993)
- Samooham (1993)
- Naaraayam (1993)
- Kudumba Vishesham (1994)
- Achan Kompathu Amma Varampathu (1995)
- Harbour (1996)
- Kalyaana Saugandhikam (1996)
- Ullaasapoonkaattu (1997)
- Maayapponmaan (1997)
- Aayushmaan Bhava (1998)
- Ilamura Thampuraan (1998)
- Aaghosham (1998)
- Aakaashaganga (1999)
- Vaasanthiyum Lakshmiyum Pinne Njaanum (1999)
- Mazhavillu (1999)
- Daivathinte Makan (2000)
- Karumaadikkuttan (2001)
- Mazhathullikkilukkam (2002)
- Sadaanandante Samayam (2003)
- Mr Brahmachaari (2003)
- Kusruthy (2004)
- Boy Friend (2005)
- The Don (2006)
- Panthayakkozhi (2007)
- Kangaroo (2007)
- Kaancheepurathe Kalyaanam (2009)
- Utharaaswayamvaram (2009)
- Black Butterfly (2013)
- Honebee 2.5 (2017)

=== Screenplay ===
- Saanthwanam (1991)
- Mukhachitram (1991)
- Mukhamudra (1992)
- Ponnaramthottathe Raajaavu (1992)
- Snehasaagaram (1992)
- Addeham Enna Iddeham (1993)
- Samooham (1993)
- Naaraayam (1993)
- Kudumba Vishesham (1994)
- Achan Kompathu Amma Varampathu (1995)
- Harbour (1996)
- Kalyaana Saugandhikam (1996)
- Maayapponmaan (1997)
- Aayushmaan Bhava (1998)
- Vaasanthiyum Lakshmiyum Pinne Njaanum (1999)
- Mazhavillu (1999)
- Daivathinte Makan (2000)
- Karumaadikkuttan (2001)
- Mazhathullikkilukkam (2002)
- Sadaanandante Samayam (2003)
- War and Love(2003)
- Mr Brahmachaari (2003)
- Kusruthy (2004)
- Boy Friend (2005)
- The Don (2006)
- Panthayakkozhi (2007)
- Kangaroo (2007)
- Kaancheepurathe Kalyaanam (2009)
- Utharaaswayamvaram (2009)
- Black Butterfly (2013)

=== Story ===
- Ananthavruthaantham (1990)
- Saanthwanam (1991)
- Mukhachitram (1991)
- Mukhamudra (1992)
- Snehasaagaram (1992)
- Addeham Enna Iddeham (1993)
- Samooham (1993)
- Harbour (1996)
- Kalyaana Saugandhikam (1996)
- Ullaasapoonkaattu (1997)
- Maayapponmaan (1997)
- Ilamura Thampuraan (1998)
- Aaghosham (1998)
- Aakaashaganga (1999)

=== Acting ===
- Ponnaranjanam (1990)
- Mazhavillu (1999)
- Karumadikkuttan (2001)
- Rakshasarajavu (2001)
- Mazhathullikkilukkam (2002)
- Sadanadante Samayam (2003)
- Natturajavu (2004)
- Classmates (2006)
- Panthayakkozhi (2007)
- Detective (2007)
- Novel (2008)
- Aandavan (2008)
- Utharaswayamvaram (2009)
- Vellaripraavinte Changaathi (2011)
- Venichile Vyapari (2011)
- Kalikkaalam (2012)
- Black Butterfly (2013)
- Natholi Oru Cheriya Meenalla (2013)
- Romans (2013)
- 2 Countries (2015)
- Aami (2018)

=== Television ===
- Akashadoothu (TV series) (Surya TV) - Actor
- Vanambadi (TV series) ( Asianet) - Actor and screenplay
- Santhwanam (TV series) (Asianet) -screenplay
