= Nanma =

2007 Indian Malayalam-language film

- Directed by: Sarathchandran Wayanad
- Starring: Kalabhavan Mani; Rahman; Souparnika subhash
- Cinematography: Shamdat Sainudeen
- Release date: 1 June 2007 (India)
- Country: India
- Language: Malayalam

Nanma is a 2007 Indian Malayalam-language action drama film, directed by Sarathchandran Wayanad, starring Kalabhavan Mani and Rahman.

== Plot ==
For a living, Muthu Chettiyar extracts and disposes corpses. Unknown to Muthu, his son Nakulan becomes a henchman to his childhood friend turned enemy Paramashivam, a money lender as he wants his father to have a respectable job.

== Cast ==
- Kalabhavan Mani as Muthu Chettiyar
- Rahman as Nakulan
- Adithya Menon as Paramashivam (Parasu)
- Sajith Raj
- Dhanya Mary Varghese as Tara
- Udhayathara as Meera
- Suja Karthika as Seetha
- Souparnika subhash as Lakshmi
- Manikandan
- Ponnamma Babu as Karpagam
- Kalasala Babu
- Abu Salim as Mortuary Ayyappan

== Reception ==
The Times of India said the director, "Sharath Chandra Wynad has lived up to the expectations of Malayalam viewers' story, screenplay and direction".
