= Athira =

Athira is a given name. Notable people with the name include:

- Athira Patel, Indian actress
- L. Athira Krishna, Indian violinist

== See also ==
- Athira Pharma, therapeutics company
- Aathira, 2015 Tamil-language soap opera
