= Anyar (film) =

- Directed by: Lenin Rajendran
- Produced by: Hari Kumar
- Starring: Jyothirmayi; Biju Menon
- Edited by: B. Ajithkumar
- Release date: 19 September 2003
- Country: India
- Language: Malayalam

Anyar is a Malayalam language film of India. It was released on 19 September 2003. The film deals with the hot topic of communal polarisation in Kerala. The film stars Jyothirmayi and Biju Menon

== Plot ==
Sooraj and Razia are college mates. Some incidents make them fall for each other and both of them end up spending the night together. After that, they start facing social problems because of their different religions. Razia becomes a journalist and Sooraj becomes a film maker. At one point, both of them break up and Razia, who arrives at Sooraj's house to apologize, is shocked to see Sooraj making out with another girl. After some years both of them get reunited.

== Cast ==
- Jyothirmayi as Raziya
- Biju Menon as Sooraj
- Lal as Raghavan
- Rati Agnihotri as Kamala
