= Vinayan =

Indian film director

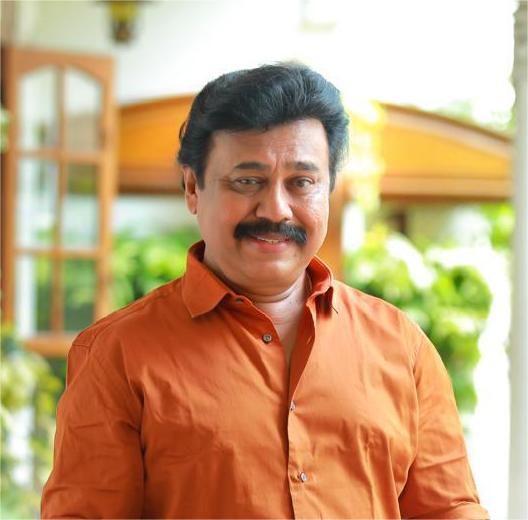
- Born: T. G. Vinayakumar
- Occupations: Director; screenwriter; producer; lyricist
- Years active: 1989–present

T. G. Vinayakumar, professionally credited as Vinayan, is an Indian film director, screenwriter, producer, and lyricist, who works predominantly in Malayalam cinema and occasionally in Tamil cinema. He has directed 40 Malayalam films and 4 Tamil films.

== Career ==
Vinayan started his career with the film Superstar, and has directed films like Vasanthiyum Lakshmiyum Pinne Njaanum, Karumadikkuttan, Oomappenninu Uriyadappayyan, Dada Sahib, Vellinakshatram, Aakasha Ganga, Rakshasa Rajavu, Kalyana Sougandhikam, Kasi, En Mana Vaanil, Independence, Sathyam, Albhutha Dweep, Athishayan, Dracula 2012 and Sipayi Lahala. The genres of his films include comedy, horror, action, fantasy and family drama.

Vinayan also introduced a number of actors and singers in the Malayalam film industry, including Jayasurya, Indrajith Sukumaran, Anoop Menon, Honey Rose, Priyamani, Manikkuttan, Suresh Krishna, Meghana Raj, Sanusha, Lakshmi Menon, Sithara (singer), Sudeep kumar (singer) etc. He also introduced Telugu actor Sharwanand into Tamil cinema through the 2009 film Naalai Namadhe.

In 2005, Vinayan wrote and directed the film Albhuthadweep (Wonder Island) which cast around 300 dwarfs for the first time in a film. The two-foot-high hero of the film, Ajayan, was written in the Guinness Book of Records and Vinayan himself was listed in India's Limca Book of Records. The film garnered the FilmFare and the Cinema Express awards, and was successfully remade in 2007 in the Tamil language by Vinayan himself.

Vinayan has also remade a few of his films into Tamil. He is also a script writer and lyricist. He directed a Malayalam television serial Iniyonnu Visramikkatte before making movies.

Vinayan was the first general secretary of MACTA Federation, which was the first trade union in Malayalam cinema for workers and technicians. He has also launched a co-operative society (with the assistance of the Government of Kerala) for the benefit of film workers. Vinayan is also the Advisory Member of the Cine Workers Welfare Board, sponsored by the Government of India.

In 2008, when actor Dileep violated an agreement and was called out by the MACTA Federation, the actors’ association—backed by superstars and supported by producers and directors—retaliated by splitting the federation and banning its general secretary, Vinayan, for daring to challenge their nexus. Challenging the ban, Vinayan took the matter to the Supreme Court, which in 2020 ruled in his favor—lifting the ban and imposing fines on the president of the actors’ association, Innocent, as well as key FEFKA leaders like Sibi Malayil and B. Unnikrishnan. It was after these events that Vinayan went on to direct Pathonpathaam Noottandu, a big-budget historical film that sparked widespread discussion in Kerala and emerged as a box office success.

== Filmography ==
=== As director ===
Year	Title	Notes
1989	Aayiram Chirakulla Moham	
1990	Superstar	
1992	Kunjikkuruvi	
1993	Kanyakumariyil Oru Kavitha	
1995	Sipayi Lahala	
1996	Mr. Clean	
1996	Kalyana Sougandhikam	
1997	Ullasapoongattu	
1998	Anuragakottaram	
1999	Aakasha Ganga	
1999	Vasanthiyum Lakshmiyum Pinne Njaanum	Won Critics Award for Best Director — Malayalam
1999	Pranaya Nilavu	
1999	Independence	
2000	Daivathinte Makan	
2000	Dada Sahib	
2001	Karumadikkuttan	Won Filmfare Awards South for Best Director — Malayalam
2001	Rakshasa Rajavu	
2001	Kasi	Tamil remake of Vasanthiyum Lakshmiyum Pinne Njaanum
2002	Oomappenninu Uriyadappayyan	
2002	Kattuchembakam	
2002	En Mana Vaanil	Tamil remake of Oomappenninu Uriyadappayyan
2003	Meerayude Dukhavum Muthuvinte Swapnavum	
2003	War and Love	
2004	Vellinakshatram	
2004	Sathyam	
2005	Athbhutha Dweepu	
2005	Boyy Friennd	
2007	Athisayan	
2007	Black Cat	
2007	Hareendran Oru Nishkalankan	
2009	Naalai Namadhe	Tamil film
2010	Yakshiyum Njanum	
2011	Raghuvinte Swantham Rasiya	
2013	Dracula 2012	3D film
2014	Little Superman	3D film
2018	Chalakkudikkaran Changathi	Biopic of Kalabhavan Mani
2019	Aakasha Ganga 2	
2022	Pathonpatham Noottandu	Biopic of Arattupuzha Velayudha Panicker, Nangeli and Kayamkulam Kochunni

==== Television serials ====
- Iniyonnu Visramikkatte (Doordarshan)

=== As producer ===
- Aakasha Ganga (1999)
- Raghuvinte Swantham Rasiya (2011)
- Dracula 2012 (2013)
- Aakasha Ganga 2 (2019)

=== As lyricist ===
- Karumadikuttan (2001)
- Rakshasarajavu (2001)
- Boyy Friennd (2001)
- Kaattuchembakam (2002)
- Omappenninu Uriyadapayyan (2002)
- Sathyam (2004)
- Albhuthadweep (2005)
- Athisayan (2007)
- Yakshiyum Njanum (2010)
- Dracula 3D (2013)

=== As actor ===
- Meenamasathile Sooryan (1986) - Madhavan
- Alilakkuruvikal (1989)
- Mollywood Times (2026) - Cameo as himself

== Accolades ==
Year	Award	Category	Film	Ref
2000	Critics Award	Best Director - Malayalam	Vasanthiyum Lakshmiyum Pinne Njaanum	
2001	Filmfare Awards South	Best Director – Malayalam	Karumadikkuttan	
2002	Filmfare Awards South	Best Director - Tamil	Kasi	
2003	Atlas Award	Best Director - Malayalam	Dada Sahib	
2005	Cinema Express Award	Best Director - Malayalam	Albhutha Dweep	
2023	Kerala Vision Award	Best Director & Best Film - Malayalam	Pathonpatham Noottandu	
