= Runway (2004 film) =

- DVD Cover
- Directed by: Joshiy
- Written by: Udayakrishna-Siby K. Thomas
- Produced by: V. K. Naushad; Mohandas
- Starring: Dileep; Indrajith Sukumaran; Murali; Harisree Ashokan; Kavya Madhavan
- Cinematography: P. Sukumar
- Edited by: Ranjan Abraham
- Music by: Songs: Suresh Peters; Score: S. P. Venkatesh
- Production company: N. N. S. Arts
- Distributed by: Swargachithra Release
- Release date: 25 April 2004
- Running time: 169 minutes
- Country: India
- Language: Malayalam

Runway is a 2004 Indian Malayalam-language gangster film directed by Joshiy and written by Udayakrishna and Siby K. Thomas. It stars Dileep, Indrajith Sukumaran, Murali, Harisree Ashokan and Kavya Madhavan. The film revolves around Unni Damodaran (Dileep), who, due to financial problems, becomes an infamous spirit smuggler, Valayar Paramasivam, operating through the Kerala-Tamil Nadu border check-post of Walayar. He works for the mafia kingpin Bhai (Murali).

== Plot ==
The film begins when Gopika and her father move into a house where Bharathiyamma stays with her two children, Balu, and Ambili. Bharathiyamma has one more son, Unni Damodar, her eldest child, who apparently works in Dubai. Unni tells his family that he is working in the Gulf but in reality is a powerful gangster, Valayar Paramashivam, who runs an illegal liquor mafia with Chandy “Bhai”, along with Achayan and Achuvettan in Valayar.

He accepts a four-year term imprisonment, but actually the accused was Bhai. Unni, however, confesses his deeds to Gopika, whom his mother wants him to marry. After leaving the jail, Paramasivam realizes that Bhai has fallen into a huge debt because of the cheating of Chinnadan Varkey and his sons. He then goes to Valayar and thus saves Bhai and his family from debt with his wicked mind and tricks. He again rules spirit deals in Valayar area, pulling the Chinnadans into trouble. Things change when Balu becomes the new Sub-Inspector. He is posted in the Valayar area, where Unni and Bhai rule.

In Valayar, Balu tries his level best to catch Valayar Paramasivam but does not know that it is none other than his brother, and fails in the mind game played by Unni. This makes Bhai angry with Balu. But Paramasivam tells him to forgive Balu because he was his brother. In the meantime, Unni's family discovers that he himself is Paramasivam after Gopika's uncle Divakaran, a jail guard in the jail where he was imprisoned, visits them, and he is ousted from his family. Later, Chinnadan kills Bhai's only son, Johnny, and blames Balu as the real killer. This made Bhai very desperate, and he wants to kill Balu. Bhai kidnaps him. On knowing this, Paramasivam goes to save Balu and informs Bhai that the actual killer was SP by identifying the ring marks in Johnny's face.

Paramasivam assures him that he will help him avenge his son's death despite Balu's protest. After realizing the innocence of Balu, Bhai and Paramasivam kills the Chinnadans by releasing gas and spirit into their house after locking all the doors and triggering an explosion through a toy plane. The film moves to the climax, where it is shown that Paramasivam gets acquitted of all their cases since Bhai has pleaded guilty to all the crimes. He says it's his turn to lead a free life.

== Cast ==
- Dileep as Unni Damodhar / Valayar Paramasivam
- Indrajith Sukumaran as SI Balu Damodhar, Unni's younger brother
- Murali as Chandy (Bhai), Unni's boss
- Harisree Ashokan as Porinju / Biju, Unni's jailmate and friend
- Kavya Madhavan as Gopika, Unni's love interest and fiancée
- Kalasala Babu as Chinnadan Varkey, Chandy's rival
- Riyaz Khan as Chinnadan Babu, Chinnadan Varkey's son
- Vishnu Prasad as Chinnadan Sajan, Varkey's son
- Kaviyoor Ponnamma as Bharathi Damodhar / Bharathiyamma, Unni's, Balu's and Ambili's mother
- Suja Karthika as Ambili Damodhar; Unni and Balu's younger sister
- Oduvil Unnikrishnan as Krishnan Nair, Gopika's father
- Cochin Haneefa as Jailor Divakaran, Gopika's uncle
- Jagathy Sreekumar as Kariyachan
- Shammi Thilakan as SP Viswanathan IPS
- Mithun Ramesh as Johnny, Chandy's Son
- Ambika Mohan as Chandy's Wife
- Santhosh as Achayan, Paramasivam's assistant
- Mohan Jose as Achu, Paramasivam's assistant
- Kalabhavan Shajohn as Pandyan, Bhai's acolyte
- Nandu Pothuval as Bhai's acolyte
- Sudheer Sukumaran as Zachariah, Chinnadan's son
- Abdul Majeed as Chinnadan Pothen, Varkey's brother
- Chali Pala as ASI Kannan
- P.C George as Superintendent of Police-Prisons Azeez
- Abraham Koshy as Excise Officer at Walayar checkpost
- Narayanankutty as House Broker
- Nivedya as Viswanathan's wife
- Bhavana as Dancer in the Song "Osalama Ailesa" (Cameo)

== Music ==
Runway: Original Motion Picture Soundtrack

Soundtrack album to Runway by Suresh Peters and S. P. Venkatesh
- Released: 25 April 2004 (India)
- Recorded: 2004
- Venue: Thiruvananthapuram
- Studios: Chithranjali, Trivandrum
- Genre: Film score
- Length: 27:20
- Language: Malayalam
- Label: Satyam Audios
- Producer: Songs: Suresh Peters Background score: S. P. Venkatesh

Suresh Peters chronology
Thenkasi Pattanam (2002)	Runway: Original Motion Picture Soundtrack (2004)	Mazhathullikkilukkam (2004)
External audio
- Audio Jukebox on YouTube

S. P. Venkatesh chronology
Vajram (2004)	Runway (2004)	Mambazhakkalam (2004)

Singles from Runway
- 1. "Pulariyiloru Poothinkal" Released: 25 April 2004; 2. "Nadiye Nile Nadiye" Released: 25 April 2004

Runway consists of 6 songs, including one instrumental version, which were composed by Suresh Peters, and the Original background music is scored by S. P. Venkatesh. All the lyrics were penned by Gireesh Puthenchery.

Track listing
No.	Title	Artist(s)	Length
1.	"Pulariyiloru Poothinkal(Raga:Kalyani)"	K. S. Chithra	4:56
2.	"Nadiye Nile Nadiye"	Vidhu Prathap, Sujatha Mohan	4:22
3.	"Oh Salama Ailesa"	Karthik	4:05
4.	"Shaba Shaba"	Afsal, Sunitha Sarathy	5:42
5.	"Jathi Dance"	Instrumental	3:20
6.	"Pattu Vennilavu"	Suresh Peters, Jyotsna Radhakrishnan, Sudha ragunathan	4:55
Total length:			27:20

== Remake ==
The film was remade in Telugu as Nayakudu with Rajasekhar.

== Sequel ==
In 2016, it was announced by Dileep that a sequel is in works, titled Valayar Paramasivam.

== Box office ==
The film was the second highest grosser of 2004, after Sethuramaiyer CBI.
