= Role Models (2017 film) =

Indian romantic comedy film

- Theatrical release poster
- Directed by: Rafi
- Written by: Rafi
- Story by: Rafi
- Produced by: Vaishak Rajan
- Starring: Fahadh Faasil; Namitha Pramod; Vinayakan; Sharaf U Dheen; Vinay Forrt
- Cinematography: Shamdat Sainudeen
- Edited by: V. Saajan
- Music by: Gopi Sundar
- Production company: Vaishaka Cinima
- Distributed by: Phars Films & Tricolor Entertainment
- Release date: 25 June 2017
- Running time: 131 minutes
- Country: India
- Language: Malayalam

Role Models is a 2017 Indian Malayalam-language romantic comedy-drama film written and directed by Rafi. It stars Fahadh Faasil along with Namitha Pramod, Vinayakan, Sharaf U Dheen and Vinay Forrt. It was shot in various locations of Goa and Dubai and released on 25 June 2017 in Kerala.

== Plot ==
The film opens with Gautham being an asocial man, very different from his college days. His father asks Gautham's college friends Rexxie and Jyothish to help him. Coming to know that Gautham insulted a girl during a date at the public library for which her father called him gay as he wasn't interested in females, the two go to his office. But Gautham treats them rather formally. Then they see his boss shouting at him and he listens to it patiently, which they find difficult to digest because he was unlike the Gautham they had heard of. They find out that he isn't gay.

Their college days are revealed showing Gautham being a very social person. He was the lead singer of a band named 'Role Models' which consisted of Shreya, Jyothish, Rexxie and Subhan, a flirt. They were best friends and everyone liked them but Gautham's parents disliked their son being with them. Then it is revealed that Gautham's parents gave a complaint to the principal with Gautham's signature which Gautham signed when he was drunk. As a result, the three were expelled. Gautham tries to explain to them that it wasn't him who gave the complaint and that they all knew each other's secrets and they should not break up. But Subhan asks him in anger why he kept his love affair a secret and the others are surprised. Eventually, they are separated.

Rexxie and Jyothish tell Gautham that Subhan was having cancer and that he wants to meet Gautham which was a lie. Gautham goes with them to Subhan's place. Subhan has become a football player and is still a bachelor. Rexxie asks with whom Gautham had a love affair and Subhan tells that it was Christy, a tomboy who they all know. Then it is shown that Christy had written a love letter to Gautham which was caught by the principal.

The three of them bring back Christy, who is getting married in a month. But Gautham is unhappy to see her and reveals that it was he who had given the letter to the principal. Hearing Gautham's answer she tries to beat him. Then he reveals that he used to like Shreya and not Christy. Reuniting with Shreya and solving issues between Shreya and Gautham's parents form the rest of the plot.

== Cast ==
- Fahadh Faasil as Gautham S. Menon
- Vinayakan as Jyothish Narayanan
- Sharaf U Dheen as Rexxie Joseph
- Vinay Forrt as Subhan Abdul Khader
- Namitha Pramod as Shreya Menon
- Srinda Arhaan as Christy
- Renji Panicker as Shekhar, Gautham's father
- Siddique as Menon, Shreya's father
- Seetha as Gautham's mother
- Suraj Venjarammoodu as News reporter
- Dileesh Pothan as Gautham's boss
- Rafi as Dr Krishnadev, Shreya's uncle
- Bibin George as Chinnamaani
- Aswathi Menon as Lucy, Shreya's aunty
- Rithu Manthra as Gautham's workmate
- Anjali Nair as Natasha, social activist
- Balachandran Chullikkadu as College Principal Dr. Abraham Mathew
- Chembil Ashokan as Joseph, Rexxie's father
- James Pottackal as Party Leader (cameo appearance)
- Sadiq as Ravi
- Aju Varghese as Kiran (voice only)
- Harishree Ashokan as Ramanan (cameo appearance)
- Cochin Haneefa as Gangadharan (photo presence)

== Reception ==
The film garnered generally positive reviews, praising it as a fun-filled family entertainer. Fahadh Faasil, Vinaayakan, Sharaf U Dheen and Vinay Forrt received positive notice. It includes a comic first half and an engaging second half. The film also includes Harishree Ashokan in a guest role as "Ramanan", playing the same popular troll character he played in Punjabi House.
