= Kodanda Rama =

- VCD cover
- Directed by: V. Ravichandran
- Written by: Rafi Mecartin
- Screenplay by: V. Ravichandran
- Based on: Thenkasipattanam by Rafi Mecartin
- Produced by: V. Venkata Rao
- Starring: V. Ravichandran; Shiva Rajkumar; Sakshi Shivanand; Asha Saini
- Cinematography: G. S. V. Seetharam
- Edited by: Shyam Yadav
- Music by: V. Ravichandran
- Production company: Sri Lakshmi Pictures
- Release date: 17 May 2002
- Running time: 137 minutes
- Country: India
- Language: Kannada

Kodanda Rama is a 2002 Indian Kannada language romantic comedy film directed, scripted and composed by V. Ravichandran. Besides Ravichandran, the film stars Shiva Rajkumar, Sakshi Shivanand, Asha Saini and Mohan Shankar. The film was a remake of Malayalam film Thenkasipattanam (2000) directed by Rafi Mecartin. However, the Kannada version did not match the success of the original.

== Cast ==
- V. Ravichandran as Kodanda
- Shiva Rajkumar as Rama
- Sakshi Shivanand as Meenakshi
- Asha Saini as Sangeetha
- Mohan Shankar
- Sadhu Kokila
- Ramesh Bhat
- Kishori Ballal
- Lakshman Rao
- K. D. Venkatesh
- Bank Suresh
- Shailaja Joshi
- Pailwaan Venu
- Bank Janardhan
- Mandeep Roy
- Mimicry Dayanand
- Ashalatha

== Soundtrack ==
The music was composed and lyrics written by V. Ravichandran. A total of 5 tracks have been composed for the film and the audio rights brought by Jhankar Music.

Track listing
No.	Title	Lyrics	Singer(s)	Length
1.	"Hungama"	V. Ravichandran	Suresh Peters, Sunidhi Chauhan
2.	"Manaseldange Kelu"	V. Ravichandran	S. P. Balasubrahmanyam, L. N. Shastry
3.	"Baalangochi Illade"	V. Ravichandran	Hariharan, Anuradha Sriram
4.	"Dum Dola"	V. Ravichandran	Rajesh Krishnan, Hemanth Kumar, L. N. Shastry
5.	"Mallehoova Chendano"	V. Ravichandran	L. N. Shastry, K. S. Chithra

== Reception ==
The reviewer for Screen called the film a "rib-tickling comedy besides being an action feast" and that it "consists of a rare subject that is refreshing and fits the prominent stars." Before concluding that it was a "movie worth watching", the reviewer wrote, "While Ravichandran deserves full credit for making this a wholesome entertainer, it is Shivrajkumar who steals the show with wonderful emotional performance. The team of Mohan, Sadhu Kokila, Mandip Rai and Mandya Ramesh sends the audience in peels of laughter in the theatre." Indiainfo wrote "Seetharam's photography is good. Both the hero's are not lively, Heroine's are good. Mohan and Sadhu duo are the saving grace. Though this movie is remake of the super hit Malayalam film Tenkasi Patnam due to Ravi's screen play there is little distortion in the story. Overall the film is a disappointment".
