= Twenty:20 (film) =

2008 film by Joshiy

- Promotional poster
- Directed by: Joshiy
- Written by: Udayakrishna; Siby K. Thomas
- Produced by: Dileep
- Starring: Mohanlal; Mammootty; Suresh Gopi; Jayaram
- Cinematography: P. Sukumar
- Edited by: Ranjan Abraham
- Music by: Songs: Suresh Peters Berny Ignatius; Score: C. Rajamani
- Production companies: AMMA Films; Graand Production
- Distributed by: Manjunatha Release; Kalasangham Films
- Release date: 5 November 2008
- Running time: 170 minutes
- Country: India
- Language: Malayalam
- Budget: ₹10 million

Twenty:20 is a 2008 Indian Malayalam-language action thriller film written by Udayakrishna-Siby K. Thomas, directed by Joshiy, produced and distributed by Dileep through Graand Production and Manjunatha Release. The film stars Mohanlal, Mammootty, Suresh Gopi and Jayaram. The film was produced on behalf of the Association of Malayalam Movie Artists (AMMA) as a fundraiser to the Malayalam cinema support who were struggling financially. All the actors in AMMA worked without payment in order to raise funds for their welfare schemes.

The film features an ensemble cast, which includes almost all major artists in Malayalam cinema. The music was composed by Berny-Ignatius and Suresh Peters while C. Rajamani provided background score. The first two-week distributors share of the film stood at ₹5.72 crore (US$610,000). The film managed to secure third position (with 7 prints, 4 in Chennai) in Tamil Nadu's box office in its opening week. The total number of opening prints releasing inside Kerala was 117; outside Kerala, approximately 25 prints were released on 21 November 2014, including 4 prints in the US and 11 prints in the UAE.

== Plot ==
Viswanathan Menon is a retired Supreme Court Chief Justice who along with his wife came home to celebrate Vishu with his family and hopes to spend the remainder of his life in tranquillity. The joint family arrives and prepares to celebrate through the weekend, but plans go awry when Menon's grandson Arun Kumar, who is a medical student in Bangalore, is accused of murdering a fellow student. SP Antony Punnekkadan, who has a grudge against Menon's children, attempts to take Arun into custody. Arun goes into hiding, but Antony finds Arun and seizes him from the hideout. Menon's children hires an ace criminal lawyer named Ramesh Nambiar, who bails Arun out of prison.

Vinod Bhaskar is a doctor and a professor who wants to testify against Arun but is kidnapped by Karinkal Peethambaran, a thug hired by Menon's children. Arun gets murdered and Antony arrests Devan, a poor trader who happened to be at the scene. Devan's sister and his mother tells Ramesh that Devan is innocent and that he is being framed by Antony. Ramesh takes the case, where he proves Devan's innocence in court and Devan is released. Later, Ramesh encounters Devan, who introduces himself as a crime boss named Devaraja Prathapa Varma. Devaraja and his assistants deceived Ramesh into believing that Devaraja was innocent, where Devaraja reveals that he is the real killer and that he tricked Ramesh as retribution for saving Arun.

Devaraja plans to avenge the brutal murder of his brother Karthik Varma, who was killed by Arun and his cousins Mahindran and Ganeshan. This triggers a feud between Devaraja and Ramesh. When Devaraja tries to kill the last two relatives involved in the crime, Ramesh sets a trap. Devaraja escapes, but is eventually arrested by Antony. Ramesh learns the truth about the murder at the Bangalore Medical College from Vinod, who is Devaraja's close friend. Ramesh's sister Ashwathy, who was a student at the medical college, had witnessed Arun killing a girl at the school. Arun, along with his two relatives Mahindran and Ganeshan, apprehended Ashwathy and injected her with morphine to kill her.

However, Ashwathy survived, but fell into a deep coma. Karthik, who was Ashwathy's boyfriend, attempts to save her, but was also killed. After learning this, Ramesh is full of remorse. Devaraja escapes from police custody with the help of a cop and kills Ganeshan. Ramesh and Devaraja kills Mahindran and Antony kills Madhavan. The case is abandoned when Antony lets them walk free, knowing that they would escape anyway.

== Cast ==
- Mohanlal as Devaraja Prathapa Varma
- Mammootty as Advocate Ramesh Nambiar
- Suresh Gopi as SP Antony Punnekkadan IPS
- Jayaram as Dr. Vinod Bhaskar (extended cameo appearance)
- Dileep as Karthi / Karthik Varma (cameo appearance)
- Siddique as Madhava Menon
- Manoj K. Jayan as Mahindran
- Shammi Thilakan as Ganeshan
- Vijayaraghavan as Balan Menon
- Indrajith Sukumaran as Arun Kumar, Madhava Menon's son
- Bhavana as Ashwathy Nambiar
- Sindhu Menon as Padmini, Mahendran's wife
- Gopika as Devi, Advocate Ramesh Nambiar's wife
- Karthika Mathew as Alice, Antony Punnekkadan's wife
- Kavya Madhavan as Ancy
- Mukesh as CI Jayachandran Nair
- Jagadish as Constable Nakulan
- Jagathy Sreekumar as Sankarettan, Devan and Karthik's cousin
- Sreenivasan as Constable Kunjappan (cameo appearance)
- Madhu as Retired Justice Vishwanatha Menon
- Innocent as Kuttikrishnan
- Lalu Alex as DIG Krishnadas
- Bindu Panicker as Geetha
- Maniyanpilla Raju as SI Gopi
- Radhika as Radhika, Ashwathy's friend
- Kalpana as Para Mary
- Kalabhavan Mani as Karinakel Pappachan
- Suraj Venjaramood as Gumasthan Ramu
- Babu Antony as Vikram Bhai
- Madhu Warrier as Francis, Devan's assistant
- Edavela Babu as Josuttan
- Baiju Santhosh as Satheesan
- Anil Murali as Surendran
- Lal as Advocate Radhakrishnan
- Janardanan as Ramakrishnapilla
- Bijukuttan as Ottu Murali
- Harisree Ashokan as Poottu Varkey
- Salim Kumar as SP Indhuchoodan/Appache, a chef at Devan's home.
- Cochin Haneefa as Peruchazhi Vasu
- Indrans as Govindan
- Sai Kumar as Minister Mathai
- T. P. Madhavan as Minister's PA Francis
- Biju Menon as ASP Jacob Eerali IPS
- Kaviyoor Ponnamma as Bharathi Amma
- Jyothirmayi as Jyothi
- Usha as Latha
- Sukumari as Leelamma
- Mamukkoya as Vallakkaran Khadar
- Baburaj as Stephen
- Madhupal as Shekharan Kutty
- Mala Aravindan as Kurup
- Guinness Pakru as Vikraman, a worker in the tea shop
- Babu Namboothiri as Justice Kaimal
- Vijayakumar as Junior Advocate Vinod
- Pradeep Kottayam (uncredited)

Special appearances in the song Hey Dil Deewana (Characters are named as per end credits)

- Nayanthara as Diana
- Prithviraj Sukumaran as Tony
- Jayasurya as James
- Kunchacko Boban as Sabu
- Manikkuttan as Reji

== Production ==
Twenty:20 was made as a fundraiser for the Association of Malayalam Movie Artists (AMMA). The script was written by Uday Krishna and Sibi K Thomas. As a producer, Dileep was the main investor in the project, and he bought the rights of the film for 40 million. He officially handed over the money to AMMA a year before. The film shooting officially started at a ceremony held in Hotel White Fort, Kochi, with Dileep handing over the advance to Joshi. The filming was primarily held in Kochi and Thiruvananthapuram. A song sequence in the film was shot in Mauritius. The shooting of the film started on 7 December 2007 and finished in October 2008.

Meera Jasmine, who was slated to act in the film opposite Dileep, dropped out, citing a shortage of dates. There were reports that the AMMA was planning a ban on her regarding the issue. However, no ban was pronounced and Meera Jasmine was replaced with Bhavana.

The High Court of Kerala issued a stay preventing the government's planned action of allowing a 50% premium to be charged for tickets in a case where the plaintiff argued that the state only had the right to offer tax breaks on the making of films.

== Release ==
=== Theatrical ===
Twenty:20 was released on 5 November 2008.

=== Home media ===
Moser Baer home entertainment released the VCD and DVD of the movie in India. Surya TV owns the broadcast rights for Twenty:20.

== Reception ==
=== Box office ===
Twenty:20 released in 115 theatres and grossed more than ₹1 crore (US$110,000) in the opening day which was highest at that time, The first week distributors share of the film stood at ₹30.3 million (US$320,000) and grossed ₹7.54 crore, making it the first highest grossing Malayalam film in the opening week. Twenty:20 opened at the external market on 21 November 2008 with approximately 25 prints, including 4 prints in the US, 11 prints in the UAE, and 7 prints in Tamil Nadu. It completed 100 days in 10 centres, and got a distribution share of about ₹10.5 crore (US$1.1 million) from Kerala alone. The film completed 150 days in theatres.

=== Critical response ===
Sify.com described the ensemble cast as the "Mother of all multi-starrers". The site called the film a "stylish, racy and never a dull moment super entertainer." The reviewer went on to write that the film "is a winner all the way" and that "it is a blockbuster in the making and is refreshingly fresh, innovative entertaining and highly recommended". Rediff.com rated the film 3/5, calling it "surprisingly good" and gave credit to the director Joshi for "designing a miracle". It also received the Asianet Film Award for Best Film.

== Music ==
Twenty:20

Soundtrack album by Suresh Peters and Berny–Ignatius
- Released: October 2008
- Recorded: 2007–2008
- Genre: Feature film soundtrack
- Length: 13:54
- Language: Malayalam
- Label: Manorama Music

Suresh Peters chronology
Pandippada (2005)	Twenty:20 (2008)	Love in Singapore (2009)

Berny–Ignatius chronology
Hareendran Oru Nishkalankan (2007)	Twenty:20 (2008)	Kaaryasthan (2010)

The audio launch of the film was held in a function at Mohanlal's own Hotel Travancore Court, Eranakulam. AMMA president and actor Innocent released the audio CD by handing it over to actress Manju Warrier, who was the wife of actor Dileep, the producer of the film. The music rights of the film were reportedly purchased for a record price by Manorama music. The music CD pack carries a bonus VCD of the video film The Making of Twenty:20. There are three songs in the album, one by composer Berny-Ignatius ("Sa Ri Ga Ma Pa") and others by Suresh Peters.

=== Track listing ===
There are three tracks in the album: three vocals and the karaoke versions of them. The lyrics of the songs were penned by Gireesh Puthenchery.

Song	Singer(s)	Composer	Length	Notes
"Oh Priya"	Shankar Mahadevan, Jyotsna Radhakrishnan	Suresh Peters	4:49	Picturised on Dileep, Bhavana
"He Dil Deewana"	George Peter, Suresh Peters, Sunitha Sarathy	Suresh Peters	4:48	Picturised on Nayantara, Prithviraj Sukumaran, Jayasurya, Kunchacko Boban, Manikkuttan and Indrajith Sukumaran.
"Sa Ri Ga Ma Pa"	Dr. K. J. Yesudas, Madhu Balakrishnan, Afsal, Franco, Vineeth Sreenivasan, Jassie Gift, K. S. Chithra, Sujatha Mohan, Jyotsna Radhakrishnan, Rimi Tomy, Anitha	Berny-Ignatius	4:57	Title song. (Tribute to yesteryear actors)
