= Chup Chup Ke =

2006 Indian film by Priyadarshan

- Theatrical release poster
- Directed by: Priyadarshan
- Written by: Story: Rafi–Mecartin; Screenplay: Priyadarshan; Dialogues: Neeraj Vora
- Based on: Punjabi House by Rafi–Mecartin
- Produced by: Ronnie Screwvala
- Starring: Shahid Kapoor; Kareena Kapoor; Suniel Shetty; Neha Dhupia; Sushma Reddy; Paresh Rawal; Rajpal Yadav; Shakti Kapoor; Om Puri; Anupam Kher; Manoj Joshi; Asrani
- Cinematography: Tirru
- Edited by: Arun Kumar Aravind
- Music by: Songs: Himesh Reshammiya; Background Score: Rajamani
- Production company: UTV Motion Pictures
- Distributed by: UTV Motion Pictures
- Release date: 9 June 2006
- Running time: 164 minutes
- Country: India
- Language: Hindi
- Budget: ₹12 crore
- Box office: ₹25.58 crore

Chup Chup Ke (transl. Quietly, Quietly) is a 2006 Indian Hindi-language comedy drama film co-written and directed by Priyadarshan. The film stars Shahid Kapoor, Kareena Kapoor, Suniel Shetty, Neha Dhupia, Paresh Rawal, Rajpal Yadav, Shakti Kapoor, Om Puri and Anupam Kher. It is a remake of the Malayalam language film Punjabi House.

== Plot ==
Jeetu, the son of a retired teacher named Jaidev Prasad, is debt-ridden due to many failed businesses. Jeetu breaks off his engagement with his fiancé, Pooja and decides to commit suicide by throwing himself into the sea to claim insurance money that his father could use to pay off his debts. However, Jeetu is found tangled in the fishing nets by a pair of fishermen, Gundya and Bandya, who rescue him and mistake him to be mute and deaf.

Gundya owes money to a Gujarati businessman, Prabhat Singh Chauhan, who takes away Gundya's boat. Gundya cunningly makes Prabhat believe that Jeetu is his loving nephew and leaves both Jeetu and Bandya in Prabhat's house as the guarantee until he returns the money. Prabhat's niece Shruti is mute too, but not deaf. Her overprotective brother Mangal wants her to get married; however, her muteness makes her an undesirable match. One night, Shruti and her cousin Meenakshi learn Jeetu's secret and make him break off Shruti's undesirable marriage match to keep his secret.

Shruti and Meenakshi send money to Jeetu's village through Bandya to repay his debts. Bandya returns from the village and tells Jeetu that Pooja is married now. Unaware that Pooja believes herself to be Jeetu's widow, is living with Jeetu's family. At the same time, Shruti confesses her love for Jeetu. Mangal approves their marriage after Jeetu reveals he is not deaf and mute. Later, Mangal sends Gundya and Bandya to deliver a suitcase of money to Jeetu's family to secure their financial well-being. However, while delivering the money, they inadvertently reveal that Jeetu is alive. Shocked, Jaidev demands that they take him to Jeetu. Jaidev arrives at Prabhat's house during Jeetu and Shruti's engagement ceremony and sees him alive.

Jaidev reveals to Jeetu that Pooja is living as his widow and implores him to return home and marry Pooja. Jeetu later goes back home to speak to his family, but they demand he marry Pooja, and Gundya and Bandya bring him back. On the day of the wedding, Jeetu's family intruded on the marriage, wanting for him to return and marry Pooja instead. However, when Pooja learns that Shruti is mute, she has a change of heart and tells Jeetu to marry Shruti. Jeetu and Shruti get married and live happily.

== Cast ==
- Shahid Kapoor as Jeet "Jeetu" Prasad Sharma/Kanhaiya "Jabba"
- Kareena Kapoor as Shruti Singh Chauhan
- Suniel Shetty as Mangal Singh Chauhan
- Neha Dhupia as Meenakshi Singh Chauhan
- Paresh Rawal as fisherman Gundya Lal
- Rajpal Yadav as fisherman Bandya
- Shakti Kapoor as Natwar Jhunjhunwala
- Om Puri as Prabhat Singh Chauhan
- Anupam Kher as Jaidev Prasad Sharma, Jeetu's father.
- Manoj Joshi as Mohan Prakash Rao
- Asrani as Sharmaji, Househelper.
- Sushama Reddy as Pooja Rao, Jeetu's fiancé.
- Amita Nangia as Mrs. Sharma, Jeetu's mother.
- Amitha Rajan as Roopa, a Gujarati woman.

== Production ==
The film began production under the title Gujarati House. Dileep, who starred in the original film Punjabi House (1998), turned dubbing artiste after Priyadarshan wasn't satisfied with the voice for the dumb portions.

== Release and reception ==
The film was released on 9 June 2006 in India. Chup Chup Ke received generally mixed reviews. Sukanya Verma of Rediff.com praised the cinematography and Rawal and Yadav's comedic performances. She also commented that the romance between Shahid Kapoor and Kareena Kapoor lacked chemistry. The Times of India reviewer also thought that the romance between Shahid and Kareena was not believable and also criticised the lack of humour. The film grossed ₹25.5 crore at the box office worldwide.

== Soundtrack ==
Chup Chup Ke

Soundtrack album by Himesh Reshammiya
- Released: 2006
- Genre: Feature film soundtrack
- Label: T-Series
- Producer: Himesh Reshammiya

Himesh Reshammiya chronology
Anthony Kaun Hai? (2006)	Chup Chup Ke (2006)	Phir Hera Pheri (2006)

All lyrics are written by Sameer; all music is composed by Himesh Reshammiya.

Songs
No.	Title	Singers	Length
1.	"Aaya Re"	Kunal Ganjawala, Sunidhi Chauhan	04:05
2.	"Dil Vich Lagya Ve"	Sonu Nigam, Kunal Ganjawala, Akriti Kakkar	05:26
3.	"Ghoomar Re"	K. K., Sunidhi Chauhan	05:14
4.	"Mausam Hai Bada Qatil"	Sonu Nigam	04:22
5.	"Shabe Firaq"	Himesh Reshammiya, Tulsi Kumar	04:11
6.	"Tumhi Se"	Vijay Yesudas, Shreya Ghoshal	05:46
7.	"Tumhi Se" (Unplugged)	Kunal Ganjawala	02:15
Total length:			58:01
