= Sathyam Sivam Sundaram (2000 film) =

- Directed by: Rafi Mecartin
- Written by: Rafi Mecartin
- Produced by: Siyad Kokker
- Starring: Kunchacko Boban; Aswathi Menon; Jagadish
- Cinematography: Ravi Varman
- Edited by: A. Sreekar Prasad
- Music by: Vidyasagar
- Distributed by: Kokers Films; Anupama Release
- Release date: 12 January 2000
- Country: India
- Language: Malayalam

Sathyam Sivam Sundaram (transl. The Truth, the God, the Beauty) is a 2000 Indian Malayalam-language comedy drama film written and directed by Rafi Mecartin and produced by Siyad Kokker through Kokers Films. It stars Kunchacko Boban, Aswathi Menon, and Jagadish, with Harisree Ashokan, Cochin Haneefa, and Balachandra Menon in supporting roles. The movie marked the debut of cinematographer Ravi Varman.

== Cast ==
- Kunchacko Boban as Chandrahassan aka Chandru
- Aswathi Menon as Vijayalakshmi aka Viji
- Jagadish as Pankajakshan
- Balachandra Menon as K.S.K. Nambiar, Chandru's father
- Jagathy Sreekumar as Shivaraman
- Cochin Haneefa as Ajayan
- Harishree Ashokan as Vijayan
- Ambika as Nandhini, Chandru's mother
- Nassar as Indra Raja Reddy
- Janardanan as Sambhavana Warrier
- Indrans as Sashankan
- T. P. Madhavan as Hotelier
- Mansoor Ali Khan as Andhra Ponnan
- Shilpa Punnoose as Chandrahasan's sister

== Soundtrack ==
The music was composed by Vidyasagar with lyrics by Kaithapram Damodaran, except for the song "Sathyam Shivam Sundaram" from the 1978 Hindi film Satyam Shivam Sundaram composed by Laxmikant–Pyarelal and written by Pandit Narendra Sharma, which was reused in the film. The soundtrack was distributed by Sagarika music. The song "Walking in the Moonlight" was later remade by Vidyasagar in Telugu for Love Today (2004) and in Tamil as "Kannal Pesum" for Mozhi (2007) with a stanza change.

No.	Title	Artist(s)	Length
1.	"Angakale"	Shankar Mahadevan	5:21
2.	"Avva Avva"	Mano, Swarnalatha
3.	"Chandrahridayam"	K. J. Yesudas
4.	"Sathyam Shivam Sundaram"	Deepankuran
5.	"Sooryanaay Thazhuki" (Female)	K. S. Chithra
6.	"Sooryanay Thazhuki" (Male)	Biju Narayanan
7.	"Walking in the Moonlight"	Hariharan	5:38
