= Oru Sindoora Pottinte Ormaykku =

- Directed by: Cochin Haneefa
- Produced by: Muhammed Mannil
- Starring: Mammootty; Urvashi; Lissy; Cochin Haneefa
- Music by: Shyam
- Release date: 7 February 1987
- Country: India
- Language: Malayalam

Oru Sindoora Pottinte Ormaykku is a 1987 Indian Malayalam-language film, directed by Cochin Haneefa and produced by Muhammed Mannil. The film stars Mammootty, Urvashi, Lissy and Cochin Haneefa. The film has musical score by Shyam.

== Cast ==
- Mammootty as Roy
- Urvashi as Sophie
- Lissy
- Cochin Haneefa
- Lalu Alex as George Thomas
- Prathapachandran as Fr. Alex
- KPAC Sunny as Sreedharan
- Ramu
- Jose as Dr. Joy
- Captain Raju as C. K. Guptha
- Mala Aravindan
- Jose Prakash as Alexander

== Synopsis ==
With the plan of constructing a resort in a hilly tourist spot, Stanley Roy and his wife Sophie shift to a new house in that area. In order to have ample parking area for the hotel, Roy urges Fr. Xavier, the priest of the nearby church for the property owned by the church, which is just behind the proposed plot for the resort. The priest answers that he will take the matter up with the diocese when someone visits the church from the diocese.

Sreedharan is a businessman in that locality and everyone there has only good to say about him. Another Businessman is C. K. Gupta, who has factories associated with milk processing. He is also involved in illegal trading activities. Anthony owns a tonga on his own and he is the person responsible for delivering household items after purchasing from shops. His kid is being looked after by father.

At an unexpected time, Stanley confesses to the father that he is a police officer and not an engineer. He is there to catch a prisoner, George, who had escaped from jail. Since George's sister is present in the mental hospital, he is expected to come here. Roy requests help from Fr. Xavier in tracing the culprit. A beard and a black mark on the face as a result of hit by an iron rod were the identification marks mentioned for George.

A man with beard arrives in a loaded truck, and is dropped at the junction. He identifies himself as Salim and gets employed in the milk factory owned by Gupta. Though Roy enquires at the milk factory, he is informed that no person named George is employed there. Roy also informs the doctor in the Mental hospital, who is also his friend about the matter. Later when there is a conflict at Gupta's factory, it is revealed to the viewers that actually Salim is the police officer George Thomas and Roy is actually a murderer who has been sentenced to death. It is Roy's sister who is admitted in mental hospital.

While in jail, George had made a deal with Roy and was released from jail based on certain conditions. Roy was convicted of murdering the hospital compounder, who was accused of molesting his sister. However the actual molester was not the compounder, but was known to George. The deal was that if Roy helps in capturing the notorious criminal Alexander, it will be revealed who had molested his sister. Also, Sophie was George's sister and she was appointed to keep track of Roy. Roy reveals that his sister's husband met with an accident the day they knew she was pregnant and after delivery, her daughter had slipped from his hands into a tiger's cage, where she was torn to pieces. This incident had made her go mad. While she was recovering in the mental hospital, someone molested her further, increasing her sickness. Though it was suggested to keep away from Roy, Sophie falls for him after hearing his circumstances.

Roy finds arms (a gun) concealed in Anthony's tonga and informs George. On questioning, Anthony reveals that is being done for Alexander, who had killed Fr. Xavier and has taken his role here.

On the night, when George plans to capture Gupta and Alexander the next morning, Roy happens to hear that it is Gupta who had molested his sister. Though he rushes to Gupta's bungalow, Gupta was not there. While he returns, he finds Fr. Xavier alias Alexander in his house. Alexander takes away Sophie, and offers her to Gupta. While Gupta tries to molest her, Roy arrives, and Gupta flees. On the way, Gupta hits and kills Roy's sister who had escaped from the Mental Hospital, and was running along the road. Roy follows Gupta. George and policemen also trace Gupta. Going by his beliefs, George chains Roy and binds him to the police vehicle. Even though chained, Roy plans to tackle Alexander, and prevents him from escaping. Can George accept his sister's decision? Will Roy be able to escape punishment? The facts are revealed in the climax.

== Soundtrack ==
The music was composed by Shyam with lyrics by Poovachal Khader.

No.	Song	Singers	Lyrics	Length (m:ss)
1	"Innee Naadin Raajaavu"	Krishnachandran	Poovachal Khader	
2	"Kunjaadin Veshathil"	P. Jayachandran, Chorus	Poovachal Khader	
3	"Prakaashame"	K. S. Chithra, Unni Menon	Poovachal Khader	
