= Thaalam Thettiya Tharattu =

- Poster
- Directed by: A. B. Raj
- Screenplay by: Cochin Haneefa
- Story by: D. Rameswari
- Produced by: R. S. Sreenivasan
- Starring: Menaka; Rajkumar; Lakshmi; Sankaradi
- Cinematography: S. V. Sreekanth
- Edited by: B. S. Mani
- Music by: Raveendran
- Production company: Sree Sai Productions
- Release date: 4 March 1983
- Country: India
- Language: Malayalam

Thaalam Thettiya Tharattu is a 1983 Indian Malayalam-language legal drama film, directed by A. B. Raj and written by Cochin Haneefa. The film stars Menaka, Rajkumar, Lakshmi and Sankaradi. It is a remake of the Telugu film Nyayam Kavali.

== Cast ==
- Menaka as Sindhu
- Rajkumar as Ravikumar
- Lakshmi as Adv.Rajalakshmi
- Sankaradi as Velupilla
- Cochin Haneefa as Chandran
- Balan K. Nair as Adv.Rajashekharan
- Master Suresh
- Santhakumari
- Sathyakala

== Soundtrack ==
The music was composed by Raveendran and the lyrics were written by R. K. Damodaran.

Song	Singers
"Hemantha Geetham"	K. J. Yesudas, S. Janaki
"Sa Ga Ma Pa Ni Sa"	K. J. Yesudas, Vani Jairam
"Sindhoo Priya Swapna Manjari"	K. J. Yesudas
"Thaalam Thettiya Thaaraattu"	K. J. Yesudas
