= Pagalil Pournami =

- Title card
- Directed by: V. M. C. Haneefa
- Written by: Vedham Pudhithu Kannan (dialogues)
- Story by: V. M. C. Haneefa
- Produced by: Kalavathi Das
- Starring: Sivakumar; Radhika; Raghu; Lissy
- Cinematography: Ajayan Vincent
- Edited by: P. Venkateswara Rao
- Music by: Ilaiyaraaja
- Production company: Sri Kala International
- Release date: 11 May 1990
- Running time: 135 minutes
- Country: India
- Language: Tamil

Pagalil Pournami (transl. A full moon in the day) is a 1990 Indian Tamil-language horror film directed by V. M. C. Haneefa. The film stars Sivakumar, Radhika, Rahman (credited as Raghu) and Lissy. It was released on 11 May 1990.

== Plot ==
Sivakumar is acting as Deputy superintendent of police (DSP) Rajasekar, Radhika as Rajasekar's wife, Raghu as Rajasekar's brother, and Raghuvaran as a Hindu saint. Other notable cast members include Lissy, S. S. Chandran, Nassar, Somayajulu, Kovai Sarala, Baby Sangita, and V. M. C. Haneefa.

The film revolves around the lives of Rajasekar (Sivakumar) and his family, who reside in Chennai. Rajasekar's brother, Raghu, is a college student and shares a close bond with Rajasekar and his wife (Radhika). Raghu often relies on his sister-in-law for financial support.

One fateful day, Rajasekar arrests an influential person who threatens to harm him and his family. Meanwhile, Raghu plans a trip with his college friends to Kerala. He receives pocket money from Radhika and sets off on the journey. The resort Raghu stays at, managed by Haneefa, is filled with paranormal activities. During every New Moon, a spirit possesses an elderly woman and ruthlessly murders anyone staying in a particular room. Raghu and his girlfriend find themselves staying in the cursed room, leading them to die.

Upon discovering Raghu's disappearance, Rajasekar launches an investigation, suspecting foul play. He sets out with his wife to Kerala to find out what happened.

During their inquiry, Rajasekar learns from Haneefa about the existence of a malevolent ghost responsible for the killings. He later asks Somaiya for help, from which she is a Christian Monk. Somaiya reveals that the ghost is the spirit of a young girl who died due to a fire accident caused by students during Diwali–the Hindu festival of lights–who stayed in that cursed room. The girl's spirit possessed her grandmother, leading her to kill anyone who are staying in that room. The only suspected way to stop her is to burn the person possessed before the ghost can move on to another host.

Meanwhile, Raghuvaran, portrayed as a saintly man, becomes aware of the paranormal activities at the resort. He volunteers to assist in resolving the case, believing that no ghost can overpower the power of God. Raghuvaran performs a powerful Pooja based on his occult studies and rushes to save Rajasekar and Radhika, who have volunteered to stay in the haunted room to kill the ghost. The ghost, now possessing her bedridden grandmother, transforms into a strong entity armed with a large sword, she attempts to kill Rajasekar and Radhika, but Raghuvaran intervenes just in time. While Radhika manages to escape, Raghuvaran engages in a battle with the possessed grandmother.

After a prolonged struggle, Raghuvaran manages to stab the grandmother with his Trishula, causing the ghost to leave her body and enter a nearby python. Thinking the battle is over, they soon realize that Raghuvaran himself has become possessed. Another battle ensues, with Radhika desperately trying to ward off Raghuvaran's attacks. In a final act of desperation, Radhika throws petrol on Raghuvaran. Trying to protect her, Sivakumar shoots Raghuvaran, who bursts into flames due to the petrol-soaked clothing. The ghost, trapped within Raghuvaran's burning body, pursues them until they reach a nearby church. Raghuvaran eventually succumbs to the flames, fulfilling his promise to sacrifice himself and end the ghost's reign of terror.

Exhausted and emotionally drained, Sivakumar and Radhika board a boat talking to each other. The movie then ends.

== Cast ==
- Sivakumar as DSP Rajasekar
- Radhika as Rajasekar's wife
- Raghu as Rajasekar's brother
- Raghuvaran as the Hindu saint
- Lissy as Jaya
- S. S. Chandran as Jaya's father
- Nassar as a mental patient
- Somayajulu as a monk
- Kovai Sarala as Jaya's mother
- Baby Sangita as Manju/Ghost
- V. M. C. Haneefa as the hotel manager

== Soundtrack ==
The soundtrack was composed by Ilaiyaraaja, and the lyrics were written by Vaali.

Track listing
No.	Title	Singer(s)	Length
1.	"Poothendralum"	S. P. Balasubrahmanyam, K. S. Chithra	4:30
2.	"Karaiyora Katru"	S. P. Balasubrahmanyam, K. S. Chithra	5:07
3.	"Tomy Come"	S. Janaki	4:23
4.	"Maname Avan Vazhum"	Ilaiyaraaja	4:34
5.	"Poothendralum" (instrumental)	—	4:28
6.	"Sadugudu"	Mano, S. Janaki	4:33
Total length:			27:35

== Release and reception ==
Pagalil Pournami was released on 11 May 1990. N. Krishnaswamy of The Indian Express wrote, "From family melodrama to murder thriller, to a horror line about spirits of dead persons hungering for revenge, Pagalil Pournami traverses a range of story scenarios haphazardly." He concluded with a positive review. P. S. S. of Kalki pointed out that, according to the story, the full moon did not come during the day; the picture has become full moon during the day.
