= Maa Balaji =

1999 Indian Telugu-language film

- Directed by: Kodi Ramakrishna
- Screenplay by: Kodi Ramakrishna
- Story by: Bhargav Art Productions Unit
- Dialogue by: Ganesh Patro
- Based on: Punjabi House
- Produced by: S. Gopal Reddy
- Starring: Naveen; Maheswari; Laya
- Cinematography: Sri Venkat
- Music by: Vandemataram Srinivas
- Production company: Bhargav Art Productions
- Release date: 23 September 1999
- Country: India
- Language: Telugu

Maa Balaji (transl. Our Balaji) is a 1999 Indian Telugu-language comedy-drama film directed by Kodi Ramakrishna. The film stars Naveen, Maheswari, and Laya. The music was composed by Vandemataram Srinivas. The film was released on 23 September 1999 and was commercially successful. It is a remake of the Malayalam film Punjabi House (1998).

== Plot ==
Balaji is a young and ambitious man. But he is unsuccessful in his trials to make money and ends up in debt of ₹10 lakh. Unable to repay the amount, he jumped off into the sea to commit suicide after insuring an amount of ₹10 lakh for his debtors with the LIC. However, he is saved and lands up in the house of a rich Punjabi man Balwinder Singh whose mute daughter Pooja falls in love with him.

== Cast ==
- Naveen as Balaji
- Maheswari as Pooja
- Laya as Sujatha
- Sishwa
- Gollapudi Maruthi Rao as Balaji's father
- Mallikarjuna Rao
- Sudhakar as Ramana
- Vinod Kumar Alva as Sikandar Singh
- Kaikala Satyanarayana as Balwinder Singh
- Brahmanandam as Penchalayya
- Dubbing Janaki as Balaji's mother
- Indu Anand as Pooja's mother
- Duvvasi Mohan

== Music ==
Music was composed by Vandemataram Srinivas. The lyrics were written by Sirivennela Sitarama Sastry and Bhuvana Chandra.

Track listing
No.	Title	Singer(s)	Length
1.	"Andaga Jathakalisindi"	Mano, Swarnalatha	4:15
2.	"Gappchiproy"	Unnikrishnan	4:01
3.	"Nedaina Repaina"	Swarnalatha, Rajesh	4:27
4.	"Niligaganam lo"	Mano, Swanalatha	4:39
5.	"Aayee Aayee"	Sarada Malladi	4:48
Total length:			22:10

== Reception ==
Jeevi of Idlebrain.com rated the film 4 out of 5 and noted, “First half is in a lighter vein and second half is very gripping. Climax is the heart and soul of the film”. Griddaluru Gopala Rao of Zamin Ryot gave the film a negative review criticising the story, characterisations, dialogues, and direction as clichéd, and artificial. A critic from Sify wrote that "A remake of the Malayalam movie, 'Punjabi House', it is meant to be a rib-tickler but the Telugu version, 'Maa Balaji comes out a cropper as the theme has nothing much to boast by way of being a comedy". Andhra Today wrote "The powerful storyline, coupled with the competence of the director made the movie quite interesting and the climax scene is the highlight of the movie. Another point that needs mention is that the movie is not crammed with unnecessary roles in the name of comedy".
