= Aankiliyude Tharattu =

1987 film directed by Cochin Haneefa

- Promotional poster designed by Kitho
- Directed by: Cochin Haneefa
- Written by: Cochin Haneefa
- Produced by: K. Unni; Prem
- Starring: Mammootty; Revathi; Rahman; Cochin Hanifa
- Cinematography: Vipindas
- Music by: Shyam
- Release date: 4 September 1987
- Country: India
- Language: Malayalam

Aankiliyude Tharattu is a 1987 Indian Malayalam-language film, directed by Cochin Haneefa. The film stars Mammootty, Revathi and Rahman. The film was dubbed into Tamil language as Andha Vaanam Saktchi.

== Plot ==
Hari is a rich plantation owner leading a simple lonely life as a professor and painter. He likes his student Sunitha who is chirpy and always up to pranks. When he professes his feelings, she rejects saying she was not aware of this and only her parents get to decide . Dejected he tries to forget her. Sunitha meanwhile goes back to her hometown after studies. Her first cousin Babu silently loves her but Sunitha's step mother disapproves and instead selects her step sister Sridevi as she is not that much educated as Sunitha and will be a better match for Babu who is an IAS officer . Silently Babu gives in. Sunitha is innocent of all this and obediently agrees to marry a man named Rajesh of her father's choice. Both the marriages take place and Sunitha goes for honeymoon with her husband to Kodaikanal . She eventually mets Hari there who realises that her husband is actually a criminal involved in a rape and murder case. Sunitha warns Hari as she is suspicious of his intentions in meeting her privately when the latter was trying to inform Sunitha about her husband's background.

The husband and his friends rape Sunitha who is already pregnant by making her unconscious and she eventually kills all of them for this. Sunitha is arrested and awarded Death Sentence by the Court. She delivers a baby boy in jail. Hari agrees to take care of the baby as Sunitha is Hanged to death for killing her rapists.

== Cast ==
- Mammootty as Hari
- Revathi as Sunitha Menon
- Rahman as Babu
- Shari as Sridevi
- Lalu Alex as Rajesh
- Jose Prakash as Ramachandra Menon
- Cochin Haneefa as Sudhir
- Meena as Gomathi
- Innocent as "Thavala" Mathai
- Manorama as Shakunthala
- Janardhanan as Stanley
- Jose
- Santhakumari as Sarada
- Ragini

== Soundtrack ==
The music was composed by Shyam and the lyrics were written by Poovachal Khader.

No.	Song	Singers	Lyrics	Length (m:ss)
1	"Ente Vinnil Vidarum"	K. J. Yesudas, K. S. Chithra	Poovachal Khader	
2	"Ente Vinnil Vidarum"	K. J. Yesudas	Poovachal Khader	
3	"Go Back"	Jency	Poovachal Khader	
4	"Sunithe Ninakken"	K. J. Yesudas	Poovachal Khader	
