= Aswathi Menon =

Indian actress

- Born: Kochi, Kerala, India
- Education: St. Teresa's College; Sacred Heart College, Thevara
- Occupation: Actress
- Years active: 2000–2002; 2017–2020

Aswathi Menon is an Indian actress who is known for her work in Malayalam films. She made her acting debut in the 2000 Malayalam film Sathyam Sivam Sundaram.

== Early life ==
Aswathi was born in Ernakulam, Kerala, India, to Jaygopal Menon and Vinitha Rao. After her schooling in Dubai's Varkey group of schools, she pursued her higher education in Kerala at St. Teresa's College, Ernakulam and at Sacred Heart College, Thevara to complete her MA in English Literature. She has a diploma from 'New York Film Academy' in Abu Dhabi for Film Acting.

== Career ==
Aswathi attended Varkey International Private School in Dubai, where she first began performing. She then began performing in Malayalam and Tamil films in South India. Aswathi was approached to play the lead role opposite Vijay in Kushi (2000), but turned down the offer to prioritise her studies.

Her debut appearance was in Sathyam Sivam Sundaram. This was followed by Shambho Mahadeva, Savithriyude Aranjanam, Onnaman and the Tamil film Thenkasi Pattanam (2002). After a hiatus, she returned in the 2017 film Role Models and Laughing Apartment Near Girinagar. She followed it with notable performances in Trance and June She associated with a music band called' "Kallinga". She was involved in theatre, arts etc. in Dubai. She worked in a corporate company in Dubai for 15 years.

== Filmography ==
Year	film	Role	Language	Notes
2000	Sathyam Sivam Sundaram	Vijayalakshmi/Viji	Malayalam	
2001	Shambo Mahadeva	Kalyani	Malayalam	Unreleased
2002	Onnaman	Radha	Malayalam	
2002	Thenkasi Pattanam	Uma	Tamil	
2002	Savithriyude Aranjanam	Savitri	Malayalam	
2017	Role Models	Lucy	Malayalam	
2017	The Lover	Sandra	Malayalam	Short film
2018	Laughing Apartment Near Girinagar	Manju	Malayalam	
2018	Men at My Door	Hema	Malayalam	Short film
2018	Joseph	Voice (Dubbing)	Malayalam	
2019	June	Mini	Malayalam	
2020	Trance	Kavitha	Malayalam	
