= Moonnu Masangalku Mumbu =

1986 film

- Poster
- Directed by: Cochin Haneefa
- Written by: Cochin Haneefa
- Produced by: Muhammed Mannil
- Starring: Mammootty; Urvashi; Nedumudi Venu; Ambika
- Music by: Shyam
- Production company: Mannil Productions
- Release date: 15 August 1986
- Country: India
- Language: Malayalam

Moonnu Masangalku Mumbu (transl. Three months ago) is a 1986 Indian Malayalam-language courtroom drama film, directed by Cochin Haneefa and produced by Muhammed Mannil. The film stars Mammootty, Urvashi, Nedumudi Venu and Ambika. It was remade in Tamil as Paasa Paravaigal and in Telugu as Anna Chellelu.

== Cast ==
- Mammootty as Dr. Rajasekharan
- Ambika as Adv. Nirmala Rajasekharan
- Nedumudi Venu as Dr. Unnikrishnan
- Urvashi as Adv. Raji Unnikrishnan
- Cochin Haneefa as Lorry driver
- K. P. Ummer as Unnithan
- Sukumari as Mrs. Menon
- KPAC Sunny as Judge
- Mala Aravindan as "Keep Left" Ranjan
- Ragini as Diana

== Plot ==
Dr. Unnikrishnan (Nedumudi) is the son of Unnithan (Ummer) and is married to Raji (Urvasi) who is the sister of Dr. Rajasekharan (Mammootty). Dr. Unni and Rajasekharan were childhood friends. Dr. Unnikrishnan is killed in an accident and everyone including Raji suspects Rajasekharan as he was the one who might have benefitted by the death of Dr. Unni. Raji decides to fight against her brother in the court, to avenge the death of her husband. Advocate Nirmala (Ambika) represents her husband Rajasekharan in court. On the eve of the final hearing Rajasekharan discloses an important secret to Nirmala that was only known to him and Unni. Things take an unexpected turn in the court after that.

== Soundtrack ==
The music was composed by Shyam and the lyrics were written by Poovachal Khader.

Song	Singers
"Pennundo Ponnaliya"	P. Jayachandran, Unni Menon
"Poyakaalam Pooviricha"	S. Janaki
