= Superman (1997 film) =

- Movie screenshot
- Directed by: Rafi–Mecartin
- Written by: Rafi–Mecartin
- Produced by: Siddique; Lal; Azeez
- Starring: Jayaram; Shobana
- Cinematography: Anandakuttan
- Edited by: K. P. Hariharaputhran
- Music by: S. P. Venkatesh
- Production company: Kavyachandrika
- Distributed by: Kavyachandrika Release
- Release date: 11 April 1997
- Running time: 140 minutes
- Country: India
- Language: Malayalam

Superman is a 1997 Indian Malayalam-language action heist film written and directed by Rafi–Mecartin, starring Jayaram and Shobana. It was produced and distributed by Siddique, Lal and Azeez under the banner of Kavyachandrika.

== Plot ==
Nithya, a deputy police commissioner, is assigned a corruption case involving the Home Minister and his friend, a businessman named Rajan Phillip. Unknown to her, a criminal nicknamed Superman helps her in the investigation.

Superman, whose real name is Hareendran, nurtures a vendetta against the Home Minister and uses Nithya to trap his enemies. In the process, Superman uses the judiciary as his weapon and frames the men responsible for his tragic past. He provides vital information to the police for the same. In order to collect evidence, Superman himself breaks the law; but as it is for the greater good, Nithya looks the other way.

== Cast ==
- Jayaram as Hareendran / Hari "Superman"
- Shobana as DCP Nithya IPS, Hareendran's love interest
- Jagadish as SI Balachandran, Hareendran's friend
- Siddique as City Police Commissioner Rajagopal IPS, Nithya's friend
- Innocent as Kochunni, Hareendran's friend
- Janardhanan as Vallyachan, Nithya's uncle
- Sreejaya Nair as Nalini, Balachandran's wife and journalist
- Paravoor Ramachandran as Minister MSV
- Cochin Haneefa as Rajan Philip, MSV's friend and business partner
- Spadikam George as CI Jagannathan, MSV and Rajan Philip's ally
- Nedumudi Venu as Adv. Raman Nair, Hareendran's father
- Zeenath as Bhavani, Hareendran's mother
- Vinduja Menon as Hareendran's sister
- Kozhikode Narayanan Nair as advocate Kutti Shankaran, Nithya's associate
- Bindu Panicker as Swarnalatha, Jagannathan's wife
- James as Chakkachampparambil Joy, Hareendran and Kochunni's Colonymate
- T. P. Madhavan as Chief Minister of Kerala
- Krishna Kumar as news reader Krishna Kumar
- Kalabhavan Haneef as Rajan Philip's henchman
- Titanium Sasi as a Police Constable

== Reception ==
The film was a huge success at the box office. The majority of the scenes were shot in Thiruvananthapuram. The climax sequences involved a number of CCTV cameras (which were not popular at the time) and visuals were filmed at Technopark Campus Trivandrum.

== Soundtrack ==
Superman

Soundtrack album by S. P. Venkatesh
- Released: October 1997
- Genre: Film soundtrack
- Language: Malayalam
- Labels: Kavyachandrika Audios; Wilson Audios

S. P. Venkatesh scored the music and the lyrics were written by S. Ramesan Nair and I. S. Kundoor. The audio cassettes were distributed by Kavyachandrika Audios. Later, the audio rights for cassette, CD and digital release were acquired by Wilson Audios.

Track List
#	Track Title	Singers	Lyrics
1	"Aavaram Poovinmel"	Biju Narayanan, Sujatha Mohan	S. Ramesan Nair
2	"Onathumbi Paadoo"	K. J. Yesudas	S. Ramesan Nair
3	"Marumozhi Thedum Kilimakale"	M. G. Sreekumar	S. Ramesan Nair
4	"Onathumbi Paadoo"	Sujatha Mohan	S. Ramesan Nair
5	"Hole Hole Manthrikan Njaan"	M. G. Sreekumar	I. S. Kundoor
6	"Thappu Thaalangal"	M. G. Sreekumar	I. S. Kundoor
