= Kaathirunna Divasam =

Kaathirunna Divasom
- Directed by: P. K. Joseph
- Produced by: P. O. Poulose (Polson Cheranellor)
- Starring: M. G. Soman, Nellikode Bhaskaran, Cochin Haneefa, Jagathy Sreekumar
- Music by: P. S. Divakar
- Production company: Poleson Films
- Distributed by: Poleson Films
- Release date: 7 October 1983
- Country: India
- Language: Malayalam

Kaathirunna Divasom is a 1983 Indian Malayalam film, directed by P. K. Joseph and produced by Polson Cheranellor. The film stars M. G. Soman, Nellikode Bhaskaran, Cochin Haneefa and Jagathy Sreekumar in the lead roles. The film has musical score by P. S. Divakar.

== Cast ==
- Cochin Haneefa
- M. G. Soman as Ravi
- Jagathy Sreekumar as Narayanan
- Nellikode Bhaskaran as Station Master
- Jayamalini
- Sreelatha Namboothiri as Malini's mother
- P. K. Radhadevi
- Mini as Malini
- Vanchiyoor Radha
- Nagesh
- Aroor Sathyan

== Soundtrack ==
The music was composed by P. S. Divakar and the lyrics were written by T. Thankappan and Poovachal Khader.

No.	Song	Singers	Lyrics	Length (m:ss)
1	"Ilam Manjil" (Adharangal Vithumbunnu)	Ambili, J. M. Raju	T. Thankappan	
2	"Kaamabaanamettu Njaan"	P. Susheela	Poovachal Khader	
3	"Mullappoo Manamittu"	Lathika	Poovachal Khader	
