= Paasa Paravaigal =

- Title card
- Directed by: Cochin Haneefa
- Screenplay by: M. Karunanidhi (dialogues)
- Story by: Cochin Haneefa
- Produced by: Murasoli Selvam
- Starring: Sivakumar; Lakshmi; Mohan; Radhika
- Cinematography: A. Vincent
- Edited by: P. Venkateswara Rao
- Music by: Ilaiyaraaja
- Production company: Poompuhar Productions
- Release date: 29 April 1988
- Country: India
- Language: Tamil

Paasa Paravaigal (transl. Lovable Birds) is a 1988 Indian Tamil-language legal drama film directed by Cochin Haneefa and written by M. Karunanidhi, with music by Ilaiyaraaja. The film stars Sivakumar, Lakshmi, Mohan and Radhika. It is a remake of Haneefa's own 1986 Malayalam film Moonnu Masangalku Mumbu. The film was released on 29 April 1988 and became a commercial success. It won the Tamil Nadu State Film Award for Second Best Film, and Radhika won the Best Actress at Cinema Express Awards.

== Plot ==
Sukumar (Sivakumar) and Shankar (Mohan) are famous doctors at the same hospital in Chennai. They have been married to advocates Anandhi (Lakshmi) and Uma (Radhika), respectively. Uma is the younger sister of Sukumar, so both families have a healthy relationship. Meanwhile, Sekar (Nassar) is also a doctor in the same hospital where Sukumar and Shankar work, often crosses paths with the duo and holds a grudge towards them. Sukumar has the ambition of studying medicine in the abroad. But in the placements, Shankar is selected instead of Sukumar. So, to be unknown to anyone, Shankar withdraws his selection to the chief doctor, so that Sukumar can fulfill his ambitions.

Oneday Sukumar leaves for Bangalore to write the examination. The sameday Shankar dies at car accident due to brake failure. A few weeks pass by, and Sukumar goes again for the Bangalore exams. In the meanwhile Sekar meets Uma’s family and accuses Sukumar of the death of Shankar and submits the proofs that show Sukumar hasn’t travelled to Bangalore for the first time. Sekar also blames Sukumar murdered Shankar for the sake of a foreign degree by deliberately cutting the brake wire. Uma initially resists this theory of assumptions, but is convinced later and takes up the case against her own brother.

It is then revealed that Shankar was in love with a girl named Rohini for a few days before his marriage. Now, after Rohini’s death, her brother Dhanaraj (Cochin Haneefa) blackmails and threatens Shankar and expects a lump sum amount. During the court arguments, Sukumar ordered that Dhanraj be brought to prove his statements were true.

To everyone’s shock, Sukumar revealed that Dhanraj could not come because he already killed Dhanraj with his own hands. It was actually Sukumar who went to meet Dhnaraj at Bangalore for the first time and tried to sort things out smoothly without violence. While waiting for the Bangalore, he received the news that Shankar had been killed by Dhanraj. So to retaliate, he went straight to Dhanraj and killed him. Sukumar asks the honourable court that he is ready to do whatever will make his sister happy. The movie ends with Uma asking for forgiveness from Sukumar for understanding him wrongly, and they are united.

== Cast ==
- Sivakumar as Dr. Sukumar
- Lakshmi as Advocate Anandhi
- Mohan as Dr. Shankar
- Radhika as Advocate Uma
- Cochin Haneefa as Dhandraj
- Ravichandran as Thirugnanam
- Nassar as Dr. Sekar
- Thyagu as Ramu
- Oru Viral Krishna Rao (cameo appearance)
- S. S. Chandran as Dr. Yaman
- Delhi Ganesh as Public Prosecutor
- Gandhimathi as Vaigai
- Charu Haasan as Chief Doctor
- Master Tingu as Sukumar's son
- Gokila as Rohini

== Production ==
Paasa Paravaigal is a remake of Haneefa's own 1986 Malayalam film Moonnu Masangalku Mumbu. After Karunanidhi saw the Malayalam film he met Haneefa and expressed interest in remaking the film; Haneefa agreed as long as Karunanidhi alone write the screenplay. Mohan dubbed in his own voice for the first time in a Tamil film.

== Soundtrack ==
The music was by Ilaiyaraaja and lyrics were written by Gangai Amaran and Vaali. The song "Thenpandi Thamizhe" attained popularity.

Song	Singer	Length
"Thenpandi Thamizhe"	K. J. Yesudas, K. S. Chithra	04:10
"Maappillaye Maappillaye"	Ilaiyaraaja, Malaysia Vasudevan	04:32
"Thenpandi Thamizhe" – 2	K. J. Yesudas	04:28
"Thenpandi Thamizhe" – (Sad)	Ilaiyaraaja	

== Release and reception ==
Paasa Paravaigal was released on 29 April 1988. N. Krishnaswamy of The Indian Express wrote, "As long as the film dwells on the nuances in the relationships of its lead characters [...] it sails smoothly and with an assurance that signals bon voyage." The film was a commercial success running for over 100 days in theatres. It won the Tamil Nadu State Film Award for Second Best Film, and Radhika won the Cinema Express Award for Best Actress – Tamil.
