= Kochu Thampuratti =

- Directed by: Rochy Alex
- Written by: Purushan Alappuzha
- Screenplay by: Purushan Alappuzha
- Starring: Cochin Haneefa; Sharmila; Vincent
- Cinematography: P. N. Sundaram
- Edited by: N. P. Suresh
- Music by: A. T. Ummer
- Production company: Panchami Pictures
- Distributed by: Panchami Pictures
- Release date: 5 October 1979
- Country: India
- Language: Malayalam

Kochu Thampuratti is a 1979 Indian Malayalam film, directed by Rochy Alex. Director Rochy Alex, also popularly known as Caramel Alex has produced many television serials in the later 80s with Doordarshan, Trivandram and Chennai. He was survived by wife, two children, a son and a daughter who also got settled in Chennai. Director Alex was soft-spoken, short with medium complexion. The film stars Cochin Haneefa, Sharmila and Vincent in the lead roles. The film has musical score by A. T. Ummer.

== Cast ==
- Cochin Haneefa
- Sharmila
- Vincent

== Soundtrack ==
The music was composed by A. T. Ummer and the lyrics were written by Bharanikkavu Sivakumar.

No.	Song	Singers	Lyrics	Length (m:ss)
1	"Poonilaappakshi"	Ambili, Karthikeyan	Bharanikkavu Sivakumar	
2	"Raginee Nee"	K. P. Brahmanandan	Bharanikkavu Sivakumar	
