= Lal Americayil =

- Directed by: Sathyan Anthikkad
- Screenplay by: Cochin Haneefa
- Produced by: Muhammed Mannil
- Starring: Mohanlal; Prem Nazir; Jagathy Sreekumar; Cochin Haneefa
- Cinematography: Anandakuttan
- Edited by: G. Venkittaraman
- Music by: Johnson
- Production company: Mannil Films
- Distributed by: Mannil Films
- Release date: 5 September 1989
- Country: India
- Language: Malayalam

Lal Americayil (transl. Lal in America) is a 1989 Indian Malayalam-language comedy film directed by Sathyan Anthikkad and written by Cochin Haneefa. The film stars Mohanlal, Prem Nazir, Jagathy Sreekumar, Disco Santhi, and Haneefa. The soundtrack and musical score was composed by Johnson.

== Plot ==
Ravi Varma, a rich businessman settled in America, pines for his son Babu, lost at the age of 5. His blind wife had also died the day he lost Babu. With the help of his friend Unnithan & attorney Ravindran, he fakes his death & publishes an ad looking for his son. 3 people show up claiming to be Babu. All 3 of them pass all the tests Ravi Varma, Unnithan & Ravindran throw at them, leaving them confused as to who the real Babu is.

== Cast ==
- Mohanlal as Vinod, CBI officer
- Prem Nazir as Ravi Varma
- Jagathy Sreekumar as Sathyan
- Disco Santhi
- Cochin Haneefa as Kanaran
- Jose Prakash as Harindran
- Sathaar as Anil
- Oduvil Unnikrishnan as Govindan
- Saritha
- Shanavas as Babu

== Soundtrack ==
The music was composed by Johnson and lyrics was written by Poovachal Khader.

No.	Song	Singers	Lyrics	Length
1	"Janmangal Ente Kanmunnil"	P. Jayachandran	Poovachal Khader	
2	"Janmangal Ente Kanmunnil [D]"	P. Jayachandran, Vani Jairam	Poovachal Khader	
3	"Lilli Poo Pole"	Vani Jairam	Poovachal Khader	
4	"Vinnin"	P. Jayachandran, Lathika	Poovachal Khader	
