= Thenkasipattanam =

2000 film directed by Rafi Mecartin

- 50 days successful running release poster
- Directed by: Rafi Mecartin
- Written by: Rafi Mecartin
- Produced by: Lal
- Starring: Suresh Gopi; Lal; Dileep; Samyuktha Varma; Geetu Mohandas; Kavya Madhavan
- Cinematography: Saloo George
- Edited by: K. P. Hariharaputhran
- Music by: Suresh Peters
- Production company: Lal Creations
- Distributed by: Lal Release
- Release date: 23 December 2000
- Running time: 128 minutes
- Country: India
- Language: Malayalam

Thenkasipattanam (transl. Thenkasi Town) is a 2000 Indian Malayalam-language actiom comedy drama film written and directed by Rafi Mecartin, produced by Lal, and starring Suresh Gopi, Lal and Dileep as male leads and Samyuktha Varma, Geetu Mohandas and Kavya Madhavan as female leads with Salim Kumar and Spadikam George in supporting roles.

== Plot ==
Kannan and Dassan are owners of the market in their village in Thenkasi Pattinam. They become the famous gangsters under the guidance of their godfather. Dassan has a sister called Devootty who is an educated girl and wants to get rid of their rudeness in their behaviour. Years later, Shatrugnan alias Shatru joined as the manager of Kannan's and Dasan's firm KD & Co., who is regularly beaten by them due to his stupidity. Later, it is revealed that Shathru is in love with their sister, but she is not interested in him. He joins KD & Co. as the manager in an attempt to win Devootty's love and the approval of her brothers. She enquires about his coming to their village, and he says he wanted to marry her. She neglected it, saying that first she needs to make her brothers marry and have a family life. To make her happy, Shathru decides to find the brides for Dasan and Kannan. Meenakshi is the childhood friend of Kannan, who is the enemy's daughter. Meenakshi tries to prove her love, and Kannan does not reciprocate it because he knows that Dasan won't accept this relationship.

Once, KD & Co. hold hostage a music troupe that comes to their village to perform. The main singer of that troupe, Sangeetha, gets expelled from her home because of this, so Kannan and Dasan give her refuge upon Devootty's insistence. Shathru plans to unite Dasan and Sangeetha.

Soon, Kannan asks Dasan's permission for his marriage to Meenakshi, but Dasan mistakenly understands Meenakshi as his bride. On the other hand, Sangeetha is in love with Kannan.

After some fights, Dasan and Kannan bring Meenakshi to their home and start wedding preparations. Soon, Shathru realises his mistake and wants to change the brides to their respective grooms. When the truth is revealed, Dasan, who is madly in love with Meenakshi, forces her into a marriage with him. Kannan gets badly beaten by Dasan. Devootty tries to stop this, which leads Dasan to beat her. This provokes Kannan, and he fights back. Dasan falls, and Kannan tells him that he is ready to give up his love for his friendship. Dasan changes his mind and allows Kannan and Meenakshi to unite. Sangeetha is ready to marry Dasan.

== Cast ==
- Suresh Gopi as Kannappan (Kannan)
  - Biyon as Young Kannappan
- Lal as Dasappan (Dasan)
  - Shivaprasad as Young Dasappan
- Dileep as Shathrugnan (Shathru)
- Samyuktha Varma as Meenakshi
  - Vasantha as Young Meenakshi
- Geetu Mohandas as Sangeetha
- Kavya Madhavan as Devootty
  - Manjima Mohan as Young Devootty
- Salim Kumar as Muthuraman
- Spadikam George as Devarajan
- T. P. Madhavan as Sangeetha's uncle
- Machan Varghese as the Karavettan
- Kochu Preman as Machambi
- Usharani as Sangeetha's aunt
- Manka Mahesh as Maheshwari Amma
- Vinu Chakravarthy as Thevar
- Narayanankutty as music troop manager
- Kalabhavan Haneef as the prospective groom
- Sajitha Betti as Meenakshi's younger friend
- Dimple Rose
- Bindhu Krishna
- Kavi Raj

== Soundtrack ==
The film's soundtrack contains 7 songs, all composed by Suresh Peters, with lyrics by Kaithapram Damodaran Namboothiri.

#	Title	Singer(s)
1	"Engu Poy Nee"	Dr. K. J. Yesudas
2	"Golmaalu"	M. G. Sreekumar, Sujatha Mohan, Mano
3	"Ente Thenkaasi "	M.G. Sreekumar, K. S. Chitra, Suresh Peters
4	"Kadamizhiyil"	Mano, Swarnalatha
5	"Oru Simhamalayum Kaattil"	Sujatha Mohan, Chorus
6	"Kadamizhiyil (Version 2)"	K. L. Sreeram, Swarnalatha
7	"Ente Thenkaasi"	M. G. Sreekumar, Suresh Peters

== Box office ==
The film was a commercial success at the box office and one of the biggest hits of 2000. It ran for 275 days in theatres and collected ₹23 crore (US$2.5 million) then became the highest grossing Malayalam film of the year as well as an All Time Blockbuster.

== Remakes ==
This film was remade into different languages.

- In Telugu as Hanuman Junction (2001)
- In Kannada as Kodanda Rama (2002)
- In Tamil with the same name (2002) by the same director with Samyuktha Varma reprise her role.
- In Bengali as Golmaal (2008)
