= Piriyilla Naam =

- Promotional Poster
- Directed by: Joshiy
- Written by: Cochin Haneefa; A. Sheriff (dialogues)
- Screenplay by: A. Sheriff
- Produced by: Joshiy
- Starring: Shankar; Prem Nazir; Jose; Jose Prakash; Krishnachandran
- Cinematography: Vipin Das
- Music by: K. V. Mahadevan
- Production company: Rajeswari International
- Distributed by: Chalachitra
- Release date: 11 May 1984
- Country: India
- Language: Malayalam

Piriyilla Naam is a 1984 Indian Malayalam-language film, directed and produced by Joshiy. The film stars Prem Nazir and Shankar, supported by Jose, Jose Prakash and Krishnachandran. The film's score was composed by K. V. Mahadevan.

== Cast ==
- Shankar
- Prem Nazir
- Jose
- Jose Prakash
- Krishnachandran
- Lakshmi
- Rohini
- Cochin Haneefa
- Menaka
- Prathapachandran
- K. P. A. C. Azeez
- Bahadoor
- Balan K. Nair
- KPAC Sunny
- Sreenath
- Sumithra

== Soundtrack ==
The music was composed by K. V. Mahadevan with lyrics by Poovachal Khader.

No.	Song	Singers	Lyrics	Length (m:ss)
1	"Kaikalkottippaaduka"	S. Janaki, Unni Menon, Krishnachandran	Poovachal Khader	
2	"Kasthoorimaaninte Thozhi"	K. J. Yesudas, S. Janaki	Poovachal Khader	
3	"Munnaazhi Muthumaay"	K. J. Yesudas, S. Janaki	Poovachal Khader	
4	"Oru Kudam Kulirum"	S. Janaki	Poovachal Khader	
