= Thenkasi Pattanam =

2002 film directed by Rafi Mecartin

- Poster
- Directed by: Rafi Mecartin
- Written by: V. Prabhakar (dialogues)
- Story by: Rafi Mecartin
- Based on: Thenkasipattanam (Malayalam)
- Produced by: S. S. Durairaju
- Starring: Sarath Kumar; Napoleon; Vivek; Samyuktha Varma; Devayani; Aswathi Menon
- Cinematography: P. Sukumar
- Edited by: Harihara Puthran
- Music by: Suresh Peters
- Production company: Mass Movie Makers
- Release date: 21 June 2002
- Running time: 150 minutes
- Country: India
- Language: Tamil

Thenkasi Pattanam (transl. Thenkasi Town) is a 2002 Indian Tamil-language comedy film directed by Rafi Mecartin and produced by S. S. Durairaju. The film stars Sarath Kumar, Napoleon, Vivek, Samyuktha Varma (in her Tamil debut by reprising her role from original), Devayani, and Aswathi Menon. This film is the Tamil remake of the Malayalam film Thenkasipattanam (2000). The music was composed by Suresh Peters, while the editing was done by Harihara Puthran. The film was released on 21 June 2002 and became commercially successful.

== Plot ==
Kannan and Dass are owners of the market in Tenkasi. They become the famous rowdies under the guidance of their godfather. Dass has a sister called Uma who is the educated girl and wants to get rid of their rudeness from their behaviour. Manikkam pillai (shortened as Mapillai) who later joined as the manager of the KD & Co who is regularly beaten by them due to his stupidity. Soon later it is revealed that Mapillai is in love with their sister, but she is not interested in him. He joins Kannan's and Dass's firm KD & Company as the manager in an attempt to win Uma's love and her brothers. To make her (Uma) happy, Mapillai decides to find the brides for Dass and Kannan. KD & Co once keeps as hostage a music troupe who comes to their village to perform. The main singer of that troupe, Sangeetha, gets expelled from her home because of this, so Kannan and Dass gives her refuge upon Uma's insistence. Mapillai plans to unite Dass and Sangeetha. Meenakshi is the childhood friend of Kannan, who is their enemy's daughter. Meenakshi tries to prove her love and Kannan does not reciprocate it. Soon, Kannan asks Dass for the marriage with Meenakshi for him, but Dass mistakenly understands Meenakshi as his bride. On the other hand, Sangeetha is in love with Kannan after some fights, Dass and Kannan bring Meenakshi to their home, and starts wedding preparation.

Soon Manikkam pillai realises his mistake and wants to change the brides to their respective grooms. When the truth is revealed, Dass who is madly interested in Meenakshi, forces her in a marriage with him. Kannan who is badly beaten up by Dass, like said my their mentor,"one who wins says, one who loses listens". Dass himself is saddened by his inferiority complex and utters that no girl comes forward to like him all his life. As a result, he fights his friend kannan. And kannan gets himself beaten up by his friend understanding his pain and wants his friend to win. Devaraj's trick also plays a major role that he wants Kannan and Dass to separate. Kannan finally decides to give up his bride for his friend to win and says he don't want Meenakshi. Dass shows Devaraj his success. And devaraj questions him for what he wants as a success prize. That does he wants to marry his daughter. Dass asks devaraj to marry his daughter to his friend Kannan. Finally, Sangeetha is then united with Dass. Both Dass and Kannan allow Manikkam pillai to marry Dass’s sister Uma.

== Cast ==
- Sarath Kumar as Kannan
  - Biyon as Young Kannan
- Napoleon as Dass
- Vivek as Manikkam Pillai (Mapillai)
- Samyuktha Varma as Meenakshi
- Devayani as Sangeetha
- Aswathi Menon as Uma
- P. Vasu as Devaraj
- Charle as S.K.Velu
- Vinu Chakravarthy as Rajadurai
- Srividya as Lakshmi
- Kovai Sarala as Kamala
- Delhi Ganesh as Parthasarathi
- Pandu as Kothandam
- Thyagu as Thangarasu
- Mayilsamy as Raja
- Kumarimuthu as Kumaresan
- Besant Ravi
- Bonda Mani
- Dimple Rose
- Kovai Senthil
- Radhika Sarathkumar as Doctor (uncredited cameo)

== Production ==
The film was a remake of Malayalam film of same name, and Manoj Kumar was signed on to direct its Tamil version. R. Sarathkumar was initially cast in a lead role, before he and the director both backed out. Rafi-Mecartin, who handled the original, was later approached to direct the Tamil version. Sarathkumar and Napoleon was chosen to portray lead roles. Samyuktha Verma made her debut in Tamil with this film by reprising her role from original film and also marked her only Tamil film she has been acted till date.

The film's shooting took place in and around the outskirts of Palakkad, Quilon, Thenkasi, Ambasamudram, Udumalaipettai, Coimbatore, Tirunelveli and Pollachi cities.

== Soundtrack ==
All the songs were composed by Suresh Peters retaining all the tunes from original. This was Suresh Peter's second film in Tamil as composer and second collaboration with Sarathkumar after Coolie (1995).

#	Track title	Singers
1	"Azhagana Ilamaan Ondru"	Sujatha Mohan and Chores
2	"Konjam Thenkasi"	Srinivas, K. S. Chithra, Sriram
3	"Mayilirage Mayilirage"	Mano, Swarnalatha
4	"Silsilunu Silsilunu"	Manikka Vinayagam
5	"Thenirukkira Kootukulle"	Mano, Sujatha Mohan

== Reception ==
Chennai Online wrote "The film is meant to be a laugh riot, but the laughs are hard to come by." The Hindu wrote "Thenkasi Pattanam" is a colourful mela ... action-filled and humorous." Cinesouth wrote "The story? It has a strong stage drama feel. We wonder what would have happened had Vivek and the songs not spun their magic on the film and rescued it from disaster. It's hard to digest".
