= Punjabi House =

1998 Indian film by Rafi–Mecartin

- Poster
- Directed by: Rafi Mecartin
- Written by: Rafi Mecartin
- Starring: Dileep; Harisree Ashokan; Mohini; Jomol; Lal; Cochin Haneefa; Thilakan; Janardhanan; N. F. Varghese
- Cinematography: Anandakuttan
- Edited by: Hariharaputhran
- Music by: Songs: Suresh Peters; Score: S. P. Venkatesh
- Production company: New Saga Films
- Distributed by: New Saga Films
- Release date: 25 September 1998
- Running time: 150 minutes
- Country: India
- Language: Malayalam

Punjabi House is a 1998 Indian Malayalam-language comedy drama film written and directed by Rafi Mecartin. It stars Dileep and Harisree Ashokan as Unni and Ramanan with Mohini, Jomol, Lal, Cochin Haneefa, Thilakan, Janardhanan and N. F. Varghese in other pivotal roles. It revolves around Unni, a debt-ridden entrepreneur who attempts suicide by jumping into the sea so that his family can use the insurance money to repay his debts. However, he survives and is rescued by two debt ridden fisherman, who keep him as a servant in the house of a Punjabi family of moneylenders, so that they can repay the sum at a later time.

Development of the script took Rafi-Mecartin almost a year to complete. Rafi-Mecartin's script was based on a real-life incident they had experienced while on a train. Suresh Peters composed Punjabi House's soundtrack, in his Malayalam film debut, while S. P. Venkatesh composed the score. Anandakuttan was its cinematographer. M. B. Valsan and K. P. Hariharaputhran and were the film's art director and editor, respectively. Its principal photography was completed in 55 working days, with 42 days of filming taking place indoors. The film was predominantly filmed in Alappuzha district in Kerala.

Punjabi House was released on 25 September 1998 and was a box office success, completing a 150-day run in theatres. It has over the years acquired cult status in Malayalam cinema and is widely celebrated as one of the most popular Malayalam comedy films ever. The film is considered a landmark film in Dileep's career as the success of the film established him as a bankable lead actor and was his first step towards superstardom. It was also a breakthrough for Harishree Ashokan, whose character of Ramanan has become a popular cinematic figure. It was remade into Telugu as Maa Balaji in 1999, in Kannada with the same title in 2002 and in Hindi as Chup Chup Ke in 2006.

== Plot ==
Unni is an unsuccessful entrepreneur, who is in deep debt and in no situation to repay the money. Due to torment from his many creditors and lack of solace from his family, he decides to commit suicide (faking it as an accident) so that his debts can be repaid with the insurance money. He jumps off the pier into the sea only to be rescued by fishermen from a distant coast, named Gangadharan and his employee Ramanan. Unni pretends to be hearing and speech impaired in front of them, so as to not reveal the truth. Back at home, his family is denied insurance, stating unconfirmed death (owing to lack of body), putting them in a difficult situation on repaying the debt.

Gangadharan has a debt of his own, to a Malayalam speaking Punjabi family of moneylenders who are settled in Kerala. The situation demands Unni and Ramanan to work at their home until he can repay the sum. There he meets a Punjabi girl named Pooja, who is also speech impaired. She finds out that he is not hearing or speech impaired and considers him to be a fraudster, but later sympathises with him after learning his situation. She pays off his debt through Ramanan, without revealing to his family about their living son. The couple eventually falls in love and decide to get married. Her family agrees to their marriage on the condition that he will never desert her, as she had a traumatic failed marriage proposition in the past.

From Ramanan, by a slip of the tongue, Unni's family learns of his survival. They find him and demand him to come back, as Sujatha who was in love with him, still waits for him living as his widow. He is shocked by the news but decides not to return because he does not want to put Pooja through more agony. During the marriage ceremony the next day, the family intervenes, but when Sujatha sees Pooja and the pain that she is going to inflict on her family, she finally decides to let go of him.

== Cast ==
- Dileep as Unnikrishnan / Unni
- Harisree Asokan as Ramanan
- Mohini as Pooja Kaur
- Jomol as Sujatha, Unni's Fiancée
- Lal as Sikhander Singh, Pooja's Brother
- Thilakan as Kaimal Master, Unni's Father
- Cochin Haneefa as Gangadharan (Muthalali)
- Janardhanan as Manninder Singh
- N. F. Varghese as Sadashiva Kaimal, Sujatha's Father
- Neena Kurup as Karishma Kaur (Pooja's Cousin)
- Indrans as Uthaman
- Manka Mahesh as Unni's Mother
- Kunchan as Thommichan
- Machan Varghese as Lawrence
- Samshudh Abel as Sonia the wrestler
- Reena as Manninder Singh's Wife
- Praseetha Menon as Cook
- Gayathri
- Vijayalakshmi (uncredited role)

== Production ==
=== Development ===
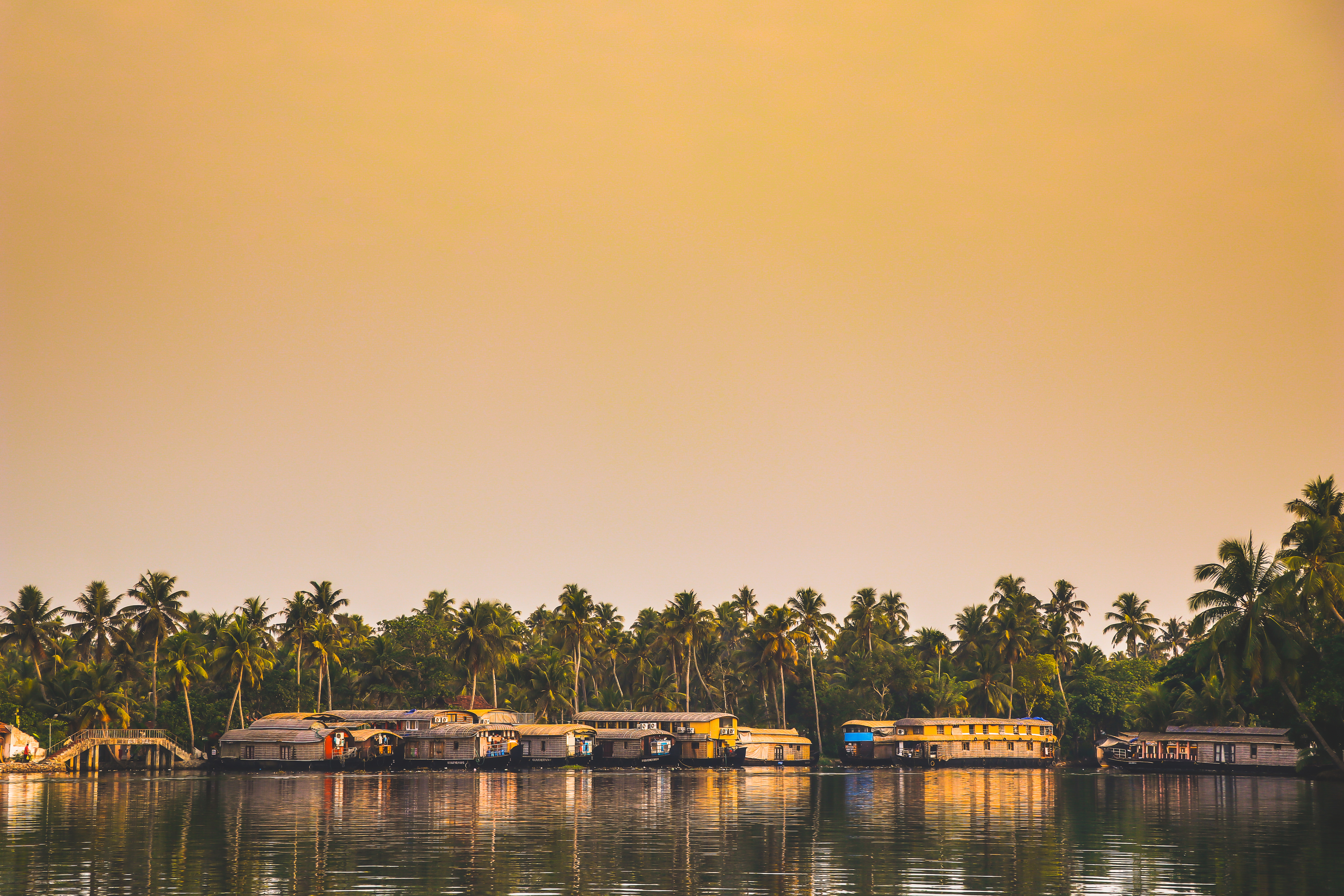
The film was predominantly filmed in Alappuzha.

Rafi and Mecartin initially got the idea for a story from an incident that happened while on a train journey. They had ordered breakfast on the train. However, since it was spoilt, they had to throw it out. Seeing them throw the food out, a student in a school uniform took the food from the ground. The duo asked him not to take the food and warned him that the food was spoilt. To escape the confrontation, the student started to act dumb and ran away, taking the food with him. After the incident, they started suspecting if the boy had fooled them by acting dumb. Initially they had thought of a situation where a man tries to woo a dumb woman who works in a supermarket by acting dumb, with Mohanlal in mind. This was then slowly developed into a story. Development of the script took the duo nine to eleven months to complete. After writing the script, Rafi-Mecartin decided to cast a younger actor for the role. Two climaxes were written for the film, the first one being Unni staying with Pooja and the second one being Unni going with Sujatha. To decide on a climax Rafi-Mecartin narrated both of the climaxes to female members of the crew and asked them to select the climax. The crew voted, and the first climax was chosen.

=== Casting and filming ===
Jayaram was initially offered the role of Unni. However, he couldn't take up the role due to prior commitments. In the original script, the main location of the film was the drawing room of the house where the Punjabi families lived. Initially, they rented out an auditorium where they would create a set. However, Rafi-Mecartin wasn't satisfied as the auditorium was smaller than planned. Then, one day they came across a picture in a magazine which featured a pandal. This gave them the idea of setting up a pandal instead of a drawing room, as it was more spacious. This led them to make modifications to the script to give a reason as to why a pandal was set up. The film was shot in the pandal for 42 days. The filming was held at Villa De Parari, a mansion located at Ezhupunna, Alappuzha district where it was nearly filmed for around two months and most of the scenes were filmed inside the house.

The scene where Unni asks all the debt collectors to come to Dharmadam, so that he can repay the debts was not actually shot in Dharmadom, but in Alappuzha. In the scene where Dileep jumps into the water, a dupe was hired from Madras (now Chennai). Upon reaching the location, Rafi-Mecartin learnt that the dupe was inexperienced. To guarantee the safety of the dupe they asked a few children playing on the beach to look out for the dupe after he jumps. After the dupe jumped, he failed to reach the surface and drowned. However, the children immediately jumped in and saved the dupe.

== Soundtrack ==
The score and soundtrack were composed by Suresh Peters and S. P. Venkatesh respectively. The former, who is an old friend of renowned composer A. R. Rahman and has been associate with the latter in his earlier films, made his cinematic debut through the album. S. Ramesan Nair wrote the lyrics for all songs. The songs were recorded at Kodandapani Audio Laboratories, and the soundtrack was released under the East Coast Audios label.

Peters had earlier done a Tamil-language album titled Minnal. Mecartin had purchased the album when he had visited Chennai. The album impressed him very much and prompted him to meet Peters. This led them to meet at A. V. M studios and subsequently was hired for their next venture. Mecartin then asked Peters to compose a Malayalam version for Mughilenna Mazhaiyenna from Minnal. Though hesitant at first, he agreed and was titled Eriyunna Karalinte.

No.	Title	Artist(s)	Length
1.	"Balla Balla"	Swarnalatha, Mano, Choir
2.	"Ellam Marakkam"	K. J. Yesudas, Sujatha Mohan
3.	"Eriyunna Karalinte"	M. G. Sreekumar
4.	"Sona Re Sona Re"	M. G. Sreekumar
5.	"Udicha Chandirante"	Mano, M. G. Sreekumar, Choir

== Release ==
The film was planned to release on the festive occasion of Onam, on 4 September 1998. However, on learning that Fazil's Mammootty-Mohanlal starrer Harikrishnans was also releasing on the same day for Onam along with six other major releases, Saga Appachan decided to release the film as an Onam continuation release, on 25 September 1998. Since the film was planned to release on Onam, post-production was complete, and the film was ready for release. To protect the film from piracy, Saga Appachan hid several reels of the film in different places till the release of the film.

Punjabi House was released on 25 September 1998. The film opened to a wide audience, with 27 screens across Kerala. It ran for 100-days in 6 theatres. The film concluded its theatrical run with the verdict of "blockbuster". The film thus emerged as the third highest-grossing Malayalam film of the year.

== Cancelled sequel ==
Mecartin has clarified that the film will not have a sequel. He recalled in an interview with Kaumudy TV, that a producer had approached him asking for a sequel to Punjabi House, but he declined it. He said that the film ended with a closure for the story.

== Legacy ==
The movie is hailed as one of the best Malayalam comedy movies ever made. The character of Ramanan, portrayed by Harisree Asokan has achieved cult status and a huge following over the years, being one of Asokan's most well-known roles. It is considered to be one of the most memorable characters of Malayalam cinema. After the film's success, Villa De Parari became a popular location and many filmmakers choose this location for their films.

== Remakes ==
Punjabi House was remade in different languages :

- In Hindi as Chup Chup Ke, directed by Priyadarshan.
- In Telugu as Maa Balaji , directed by Kodi Ramakrishna.
- In Kannada in the same name Punjabi House, directed by V. R. Bhaskar.
