= Suresh Peters =

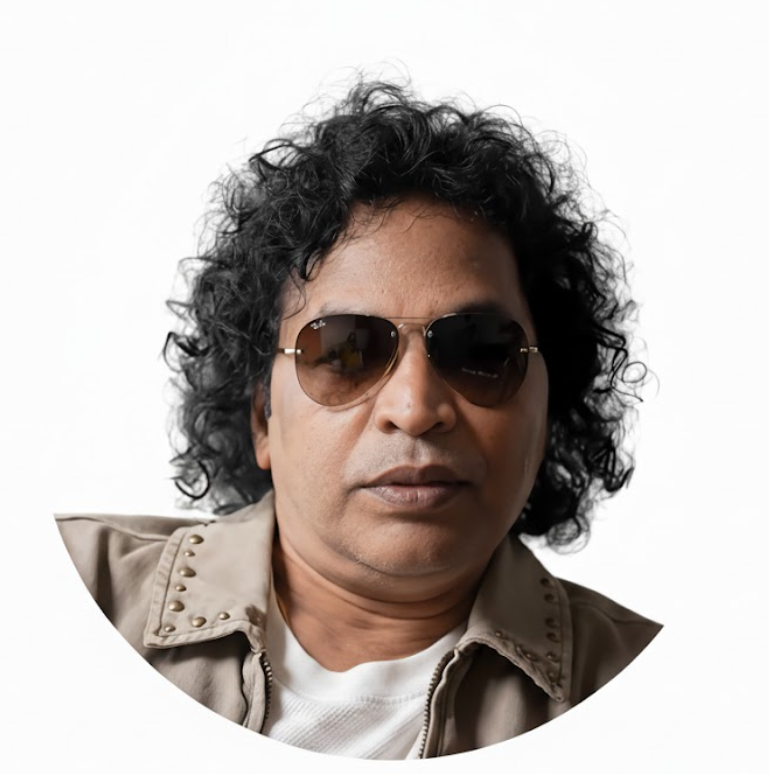

Background information
- Born: Suresh Peters; 24 April 1968 (age 58); Madras, Madras State (now Chennai, Tamil Nadu), India
- Origin: India
- Occupations: Composer, singer, drummer
- Instruments: Keyboard, drums, guitar
- Years active: 1990–present

Suresh Peters (born 26 April 1968) is an Indian musician. He is a music producer, drummer, music director in five Indian languages and a playback singer in multiple Indian languages for feature films in India.

== Career ==
Suresh Peters began performing on stages during his school and college days. He pursued a professional path in the music industry at a relatively young age. Following his college education, he briefly explored the film advertising domain, particularly in the film department.

He participated in sessions and live shows alongside established musicians. He contributed as a member of rock band "Nemesis Avenue." The pivotal point came when A.R. Rahman initiated his first film project, "Roja," and Peters joined him as an assistant. During the composition of the film "Gentleman," Rahman offered Peters his first chance as a playback singer, featuring him in the song "Chikku Bukku Railae."

Peters and Rahman went on to collaborate on a series of songs including "Urvasi Urvasi," "Pettai Rap," "Chandralekha," "Oru Koodai Sunlight," and "Super Police". Peters then embarked on his journey as a composer. His first major venture was an independent Tamil music album titled "Minnal".

Peters' debut as a music director was for a Tamil feature film, "Coolie". Subsequently, he ventured into the Malayalam film industry with "Punjabi House" in 1998. Peters' work extended to five Indian languages—Hindi, Telugu, Kannada, Malayalam, and Tamil.

Peters has solidified his identity as an independent music artist through Tamil albums, including "Minnal," "Oviyum," "Yengirindho," and "Kaathirupen." Peters remains a drummer, contributing to sessions and live performances.

== Awards ==
- Kalaimamani, 1998
- Received Prestigious Award for Creative Arts in the field of Music. Awarded by the Tamil *Nadu State Government, 1998.
- Filmfare Awards South Best Music DIrector, 2001

== Discography ==
=== As a singer ===
==== Tamil ====
Year	Film	Song(s)	Composer	Notes
1993	Gentleman	Chikku bukku Rayile	A. R. Rahman	
1994	Jai Hind	Bodhai Yeri Pochu	Vidyasagar	
1994	Kaadhalan	Pettai Rap, Urvashi	A. R. Rahman	
1994	Captain	Unakku Oru Macham	Sirpy	
1994	Super Police	Sundara En	A. R. Rahman	
1995	Coolie	Ada Kattu Katta, Hey Rum Rum	himself	
1995	Villadhi Villain	Sarakku Sarakku	Vidyasagar	
1995	Thai Thangai Paasam	Ilamaiyile	T. Rajendar	
1995	Aasai	Shockadikkuthu Sona	Deva	
1995	Vishnu	Okay Okay	Deva	
1995	Thotta Chinungi	Coke Pepsi	Philip-Jerry	
1995	Pullakuttikaran	Daily Daily	Deva	
1996	Rajali	Eera Thamarai	Aravind	
1996	Thuraimugam	Soda Bottle	Adithyan	
1996	Sundara Purushan	Getup Maathi	Sirpy	
1996	Karuppu Roja	Mella Sirithal	M. S. V. Raja	
1996	Gnanapazham	Hey Sayorana	K. Bhagyaraj	
1997	Selva	Lappu Tappu	Sirpy	
1997	Love Today	Monica Monica	Shiva	
1997	Lucky Man	Akkum Bakkum	Adithyan	
1997	Panchalankurichi	Vanthiyala	Deva	
1997	Samrat	Jimbumba	Manoj Saran	
1998	Golmaal	Hey Pappa	Balabharathi	
1999	Monisha En Monalisa	No Problem	T. Rajendar	
2002	Game	Dosthu	S. P. Venkatesh	
2005	Englishkaran	Englishkaran	Deva	
2006	Varalaaru	Ilamai remix	AR Rahman	
2007	Sivaji	Style	AR Rahman	
2014	Burma	Counting Cars	Sudharshan Kumar	
2019	Thambi	Hello Saare	Govind Vasantha	

==== Kannada ====
Year	Film	Song(s)	Composer	Notes
1998	Yaare Neenu Cheluve	"Chakotha"	Hamsalekha	
1999	Snehaloka	"Ooty Ooty"	Hamsalekha	
2000	Mava Mava Maduve Mado	"Hakki Hakki"	L. N. Shastry	
2000	Avaran Bit Ivaran Bit Avanyaru	"Avaran Bit"	Hamsalekha	
2000	Galate Aliyandru	"Thillana Thillana"	Deva	
2001	Nanna Preethiya Hudugi	"Car Car"	Mano Murthy	
2001	Jodi	"Surya Nodayya"	S. A. Rajkumar	
2001	Chithra	"Zimbole"	Gurukiran	
2003	Ooh La La	"Geleyare"		
2007	Milana	"Kaddu Kaddu"		
2009	Auto	"Life Is Automatic"		

==== Telugu ====
Year	Film	Song(s)	Composer	Notes
1994	Super Police	"Choodara En"	A. R. Rahman	
1994	Premikudu	"Urvasi"	A. R. Rahman	Along with A. R. Rahman and Shadul Hameed
1994	Premikudu	"Peta Rap"	A. R. Rahman	Along with Shadul Hameed
1995	Sisindri	"Hello Pilla"	Raj	
1996	Pavithra Bandham	"Paatante"	M M. Keeravani	
1998	Tholiprema	"Romance Rhythms"	Deva	Along with Unnikrishnan
2001	Akasa Veedhilo	"Hottara Bera Bera"		
2001	Hanuman Junction	"O Prema"	himself	

==== Malayalam ====
Year	Film	Song(s)	Composer	Notes
1995	Highway	"Adipoli Mehabooba"	S. P. Venkatesh	
1995	Kalamasseriyil Kalyanayogam	"Manikyaveena" (rap)	Tomin J Thachankary	
1997	Punjabi House	"Sonare" (rap)	Suresh Peters	
2000	Thenkasi Pattanam	Oru Simham" (rap)	Suresh Peters	
2004	Runway	"Minnara Ponnalle"	Suresh Peters	
2004	Runway	"Pattu Vennillavu"	Suresh Peters	
2008	Twenty:20	"Hey Deewana"	Suresh Peters	
2009	Love in Singapore	"Othiri Othiri"	Suresh Peters	

==== Hindi ====
- Kaadhalan (Hindi, dubbed version): ""Patti Rap".
- Bombay (Hindi, dubbed version): "Hamma Hamma".
- Chor Chor (Hindi Dubbed version): Zor Laga
- Khel Khiladi Ka (Hindi, Dubbed version): "Khel Hai Yeh Khiladi Ka"Jai Hind
- Josh (Hindi): "Hum Bhi Hain Josh Main"
- The Gentleman (Hindi): "Chika Pika Rika"

=== As a composer ===
Year	Film	Language	Notes
1995	Coolie	Tamil	
1998	Punjabi House	Malayalam	
1999	Independence	Malayalam	
2000	Thenkasipattanam	Malayalam	
2001	Ravanaprabhu	Malayalam	
2001	One Man Show	Malayalam	
2002	Mazhathullikilukkam	Malayalam	
2002	Malayali Mamanu Vanakkam	Malayalam	
2002	Thenkasi Pattanam	Tamil	
2004	Runway	Malayalam	
2004	Aparichithan	Malayalam	
2005	Pandippada	Malayalam	
2008	Twenty 20	Malayalam	
2009	Love in Singapore	Malayalam	
2009	Colours	Malayalam	
2012	Mr. Marumakan	Malayalam	
2016	Connect India Anthem	Malayalam	
2016	Rhythm	Hindi	
2025	Adinasham Vellapokkam	Malayalam	
