= Love in Singapore (2009 film) =

- Official theatrical poster
- Directed by: Rafi Mecartin
- Produced by: Rafi
- Starring: Mammootty; Jayasurya; Salim Kumar; Bijukuttan; Nedumudi Venu
- Cinematography: Sanjeev Sankar
- Music by: Suresh Peters; Rajeev Alunkal (lyrics)
- Distributed by: M.H.M. Productions
- Release date: 23 January 2009
- Country: India
- Language: Malayalam

Love In Singapore is a 2009 Indian Malayalam-language comedy drama film directed by Rafi Mecartin, starring Mammootty and Jayasurya in lead role. The film marks the debut of Navneet Kaur in Malayalam cinema.

== Plot ==
Machu is an orphan who became rich by selling scrap. The prime location for the film is in a large hall at a bottle recycling factory in Kochi. Machu starts off rather humbly but soon gets rich. Now his scrap business has branches all over India. Machu is uneducated, keeps a low profile and prefers to hang out with his two friends, Shukkoor and Narayanan. His life changes when Andrews Perreira, an Anglo-Indian investor cheats Machu into investing all his wealth into Perreira's investment company. Perreira acts as if he tried to commit suicide to give his investment fraud a lively touch. The innocent investors, including Machu, believe this and forgive Perreira, believing it wasn't his fault. The movie takes a wild turn when Machu meets Perreira's daughter, Diana, and wishes to marry her. But Perreira betrays Machu again by interchanging his daughter with his neighbour's daughter, an old friend of Machu's. On the wedding day, all falls apart as Machu and his friends go to confront Perreira for his crimes, but Perreira with his daughter had already escaped to Singapore. Then the movie goes into utter humour as Machu and his sidekick try to locate Perreira and Diana in Singapore.

== Cast ==
- Mammootty as Machu
- Jayasurya as Tony
- Navneet Kaur as Diana Pereira
- Nedumudi Venu as Andrews Pereira
- Sruthi Lakshmi as Vini
- Manka Mahesh
- Lalu Alex as Singapore Police officer Rathnam
- Suraj Venjaramoodu as Peethambaran
- Salim Kumar as Shukkoor
  - Chandu Salim Kumar as Young Shukkoor
- Bijukuttan as Narayanan
- Janardhanan
- Murali Mohan
- Geetha Vijayan
- Rajan P. Dev as Irumbu Mani
- Sukumari as Diana's aunt
- John Kokken as Rahul

== Production ==
The film was produced by Rafi, under the banner M.H.M. Productions. Lyrics of Rajeev Alunkal and Santosh Varma have been set to music by Suresh Peters. The still photographer is Sunil Guruvayur. Navaneet Kaur was chosen as the female lead because the makers wanted a woman "who looks cosmopolitan". Shooting locations included Kochi, Karaikudi and Singapore.

== Soundtrack ==
No.	Title	Singer(s)	Length
1.	"Majic Majic"	Afsal, Manjari
2.	"Othiri Othiri Doore"	Sayanora Philip, Suresh Peters
3.	"Ithu Azhaku"	Jyotsna
4.	"Kaathirikkum Thinkal"	Afsal
5.	"He Dil Deewana"	Sunitha Sarathy, George Peters, Suresh Peters
6.	"Raagamaduchandra"	Shweta Mohan
7.	"Oh Priya"	Shankar Mahadevan, Jyotsna
8.	"Vananeelimayil"	Ramesh Babu
9.	"Kanninu Kuliram"	K. S. Chithra
10.	"Vananeelimayil" (Instrumental)

== Reception ==
Rediff wrote that "the script is illogical and consists of many 'laugh a minute' portions that have been put together to make this film. [...] Love in Singapore is one of the worst efforts by the director duo Rafi-Mecartin in recent times." Sify wrote, "In one word, avoidable."
