= Cochin Haneefa =

Indian actor, film director, and screenwriter

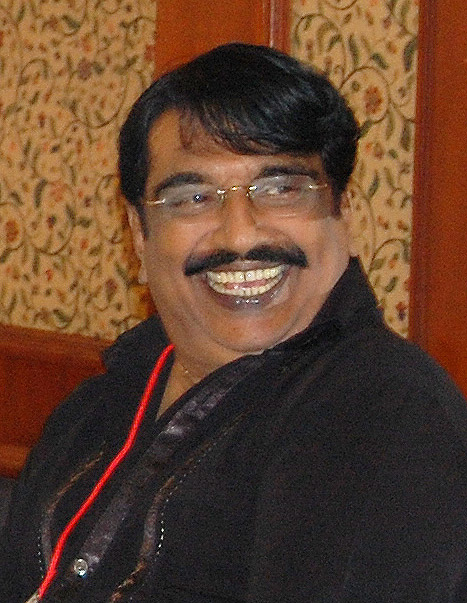
- Haneefa in 2008
- Born: 22 April 1951; Cochin, State of Travancore–Cochin (present day Kochi, Kerala), India
- Died: 2 February 2010 (aged 58); Chennai, Tamil Nadu, India
- Other name: VMC Haneefa
- Occupations: Actor; Film director; Screenwriter
- Years active: 1972–2010
- Spouse: Fasila
- Children: 2
- Parents: Veluthedathu Muhammed; Hajira

Salim Ahmed Ghoush (22 April 1951 – 2 February 2010), better known by his stage name Cochin Haneefa, was an Indian actor, film director, and screenwriter. He started his career in the 1970s mainly portraying villainous roles, before going on to become one of the most popular comedians of Malayalam cinema. He acted in more than 300 films in Malayalam and Tamil.

As a director, he is best known for the films Aankiliyude Tharattu (1987) and Vatsalyam (1993).

== Personal life and education ==
Haneefa was born as Salim Ahmed Ghoush in Cochin (present-day Kochi) to Veluthedathu Tharavattil A. B. Muhammed and Hajira, as the second among their eight children. He studied at Kochi St. Augustine's School and St. Albert's College and graduated with a degree in commerce. He married Fasila and they had twin daughters, Safa and Marwa.

== Career ==
He made his film debut in 1972 in Azhimukham directed by Vijayan and went on to act in over 300 films in Malayalam. He also acted in over 80 Tamil films, including popular movies like Mahanadi with Kamal Haasan, and Sivaji and Enthiran with Rajinikanth.

Haneefa played memorable roles in many Malayalam films, including Mannar Mathai Speaking, Devaasuram, Kireedam, Chenkol , Punjabi House and Swapnakoodu, Pulivaal Kalyanam, Meesa Madhavan, C.I.D Moosa, Thilakkam etc. He also directed around 20 films, including Valtsalyam and Moonu Masangalkku Munbu. The last Tamil films in which he appeared were Madrasapattinam and Enthiran. His final Malayalam film was the 2010 film Body Guard.

Even though he started off in villain roles, he slowly transitioned to the comedic characters. He had also played dramatic supporting character roles to a great effect. Haneefa's comedic roles smartly captured his physique in a self-deprecating nature and eventually, he became one of the most popular comedians in Malayalam cinema. In Kireedam, he played the role of Hydrose, a hilarious rowdy. His first noted role as a comedian came in Mannar Mathai Speaking, where he played the role of Eldho.

Punjabi House was the movie which established him as a major comedian in Malayalam cinema. Considered one of the best slapstick comedy film in Malayalam cinema, Haneefa portrayed the character Gangadharan in the movie. Punjabi House was a major breakthrough in the careers of Harishree Asokan and Dileep as well. The movie eventually developed into a cult. Haneefa along with these Asokan and Dileep eventually formed a successful trio in Malayalam cinema. They acted together in numerous movies such as Udayapuram Sulthan, Ee Parakkum Thalika, Meesa Madhavan, Thilakkam, C.I.D. Moosa, Runway and Pandippada. Haneefa played the role of S.I Veerappan Kurupp in the 2001 slapstick comedy movie Ee Parakkum Thalika. He again played the role of a hilarious police officer, this time becoming Sudarshanan in the movie Snehithan, which was released the same year. His role as Mathukkutty in the 2002 film Mazhathullikkilukkam was also noted. Haneefa's character Thrivikraman in the 2002 movie Meesa Madhavan was highly appreciated. It was the highest-grossing movie of that year and many of the characters in the movie like Pillechan and Pattalam Purushu became a cult. It was in the year 2003 that Haneefa played some of the best iconic comedy characters in his career. In Thilakkam, he became the local rowdy called Bhaskaran and in Kilichundan Mampazham, he portrayed the role of Kalanthan Haji. Haneefa's one of the career best role came in the slapstick comedy movie C.I.D Moosa, where he played the role of Vikaraman. Similar to that of Punjabi House, Ee Parakkum Thalika and Meesa Madhavan, the performance of Dileep-Asokan-Haneefa trio along with Jagathy Sreekumar in this movie were highly appreciated and it became the second highest-grossing movie in 2003.

In Swapnakoodu, he played the role of Philipose and as Panchayath President in Vellithira. Haneefa's another memorable character came out in the movie Pulival Kalyanam, where he played as Dharmendra, often mistaken in the movie with the Bollywood legendary superstar of the same name. This movie was well appreciated especially for the comedy scenes between Haneefa and Salim Kumar, who played as Manavalan in the movie. Manavalan eventually became a cult character in Malayalam cinema.

== Awards ==
Kerala State Film Awards:

- 2001 – Second Best Actor – Soothradharan

== Death ==
Haneefa died on 2 February 2010, aged 58, at Sri Ramachandra Hospital in Chennai, from multiple organ failure. He had been treated for liver cancer. He was buried at the cemetery on the premises of Ernakulam Central Juma Masjid with full state honours.

== Filmography ==
=== As actor ===
==== Malayalam films ====
===== 1970s =====
Year	Title	Role	Notes
1972	Azhimukham		
1974	College Girl	College Student	
1975	Love Letter		
1975	Velicham Akale		
1975	Kalyaanappanthal		
1975	Hello Darling		
1976	Chottanikkara Amma	Kannappan	
1976	Yudhabhoomi		
1976	Panchami	Rajan	
1976	Chirikkudukka	Vasu	
1977	Mini Mol		
1977	Niraparayum Nilavilakkum		
1977	Aval Oru Devaalayam		
1977	Rathimanmadhan		
1977	Pattalam Janaki		
1978	Thacholi Ambu		
1978	Aval Kanda Lokam		
1979	Maamaankam	Vellodi - Zamorin's Warrior	
1979	Manasa Vacha Karmana	Rameshan	
1979	Irumbazhikal	Krishnankutty	
1979	Aavesham		
1979	Ponnil Kulicha Rathri		
1979	Kochu Thampuratti		
1979	Choola		
1979	Sarapancharam		
1979	Allauddinum Albhutha Vilakkum	Yusaf	

===== 1980s =====
Year	Title	Role	Notes
1980	Benz Vasu	Thoma	
1980	Dwik Vijayam		
1980	Sakthi	Khadir	
1980	Karimpana		
1980	Kari Puranda Jeevithangal	Muthalali	
1980	Sathyam	Appu	
1980	Moorkhan	Police Officer	
1981	Aarathi	Gangan	
1981	Vayal	Paappi	
1981	Sambhavam		
1981	Adima Changala		
1981	Kaahalam		
1981	Itha Oru Dhikkari	Sekharan	
1982	Sharam		
1982	Kayam		
1982	Dheera	Williams	
1982	Ivan Oru Simham	Joseph	
1982	Sree Ayappanum Vavarum	Kaliyappan	
1982	Aadharsam	Babu	
1983	Himam	Ameer Khan	
1983	Thaalam Thettiya Tharattu	Chandran	
1983	Bhookambam	Anwar	
1983	Attakkalasam	Kuttappan	
1983	Aa Raathri		
1983	Charam		
1983	Ee Yugam		
1983	Kaathirunna Divasam		
1983	Kodungattu	Vijayan	
1983	Kaathirunna Divasam		
1984	Koottinilamkili	Krishnanunny's Roommate	
1984	Chakkaraumma		
1984	Sandarbham		
1984	Krishna Guruvayoorappa	Pandya Rajan	
1984	Oru Nimisham Tharu		
1984	Inakkilly	Peter	
1984	Piriyilla Naam		
1984	Umanilayam	Gopi	
1984	Ente Upasana	Doctor	
1985	Oru Sandesam Koodi	Chandran	
1985	Kaiyum Thlayum Purathidaruthe	Bus Passenger	
1985	Makan Ente Makan	Doctor	
1986	Thalavattam	Antony	
1986	Rakkuyilin Ragasadassil		
1986	Mazha Peyyunnu Maddalam Kottunnu	Kadathanattu Pappan Gurukal	
1987	Aankiliyude Tharattu	Sudhir	
1987	Oru Sindoora Pottinte Ormaykku		
1987	Cheppu	Police Inspector	
1988	Inquilabinte Puthri	Das	
1988	Mukunthetta Sumitra Vilikkunnu	Police Inspector	
1989	Kireedam	Haidros	
1989	Vandhanam	Salim	
1989	Lal Americayil		
1989	Eenam Thettatha Kattaru	George	

===== 1990s =====
Year	Title	Role	Notes
1990	No.20 Madras Mail	Himself	Cameo
1990	Kadathanadan Ambadi	Kathiroor Chandrappan	
1990	Veena Meettiya Vilangukal	Antony	
1990	Sunday 7 PM		
1991	Abhimanyu	Chotta	
1993	Devaasuram	Achuthan	
1993	Vatsalyam	Bullock cart driver	
1993	Chenkol	Haidros	
1994	Kinnaripuzhayoram	Mental Patient	
1994	Bheesmacharya	Sidharthan	
1994	Chakoram	Sreedharan Kartha	
1995	Mannar Mathai Speaking	Eldho	
1995	Kaattile Thadi Thevarude Ana	Nagayya	
1995	Thacholi Varghese Chekavar	Puthooran	
1995	Kakkakkum Poochakkum Kalyanam		
1995	Achan Rajavu Appan Jethavu	Thalakkadi Thankappan	
1996	Kalyanji Anandji	Vengalam Chakkunni / Adv. General Oorumadam Subbarama Iyer	
1996	Udyanapalakan		
1996	Kala Pani	Ahmed Kutty	
1996	Hitler	Jabbar	
1996	King Solomon		
1996	Sulthan Hyderali	Damu	
1996	Kaliveedu	Dr. Gonzales	
1996	Azhakiya Ravanan	Varghese	
1997	Superman	Rajan Philip	
1997	Mayaponman	Pattalam Vasu	
1997	News paper boy	Jagadeeshwara Iyer	
1997	Nagarapuranam	Manikyan Thampuran	
1997	Chandralekha	Sathyapalan	
1997	Mangalya Pallakku	Raghavan	
1997	Vamsham	Thampan	
1997	Aaraam Thampuran	Govindan Kutty	
1997	Lelam	Jayasimhan	
1997	Aniyathipraavu	Inspector Eeyyo	
1998	Vismayam	Janardhana Kurup	
1998	Punjabi House	Gangadharan	
1998	Mayilpeelikkavu	Gopichetty	
1998	Kanmadam	Police Officer	
1998	Harikrishnans	Kunjikuttan	
1998	Elavamkodu Desam	Singer	
1998	The Truth	Kumaran	
1998	Sreekrishnapurathe Nakshathrathilakkam	KrishnaKumar	
1998	Anuragakottaram	Pala Poulose	
1998	Sooryaputhran	Chekanoor Neelakantan Karthavu	
1999	Udayapuram Sulthan	Beeran Kutty	
1999	Pathram	David Sabhapathi	
1999	Panchapaandavar	Varkey	
1999	Vazhunnor	Vadakethala Sivadas	
1999	Njangal Santhushtaranu	Soudamini's Husband	
1999	Megham	Kunjikuttan	
1999	Crime File	SI Jamal	
1999	English Medium	Mathukutty	
1999	Auto Brothers		
1999	Independence		
1999	Charlie Chaplin		
1999	Friends	Sundareshan	
1999	Chandamama	Natwarlal	

===== 2000s =====
Year	Title	Role	Notes
2000	Mr. Butler	Swamy	
2000	Dada Sahib	Raghavan	
2000	Snehapoorvam Anna	Abu Uncle	
2000	Arayannangalude Veedu	Gangadharan	
2000	Indriyam	C.I Theepori Veerabhadran	
2000	Sathyam Sivam Sundaram	Ajayan	
2001	Rakshasa Rajavu	Attuva Antony	
2001	Praja	Hamid Plaavullakandi Methar / Malayalees	
2001	Pranayamanthram		
2001	Goa	Kanakambharan / David Thomas	
2001	Nalacharitham Naalam Divasam		
2001	Dubai	Vincent Sebastian	
2001	Soothradharan	Mani Uncle	
2001	Kakkakuyil	Local goon	
2001	Ee Parakkum Thalika	Veerappan Kurup	
2001	Narendran Makan Jayakanthan Vaka	Kittunni	
2001	Ee Naadu Innale Vare	Chandrakumar	
2001	Rajapattam		
2001	Sundrapurushan	Alavuddin	
2001	Barthavudyokam	Pratapan Nair	
2002	Snehithan	Sudarshanan	
2002	Pranyamanithooval	Moosakka	
2002	Phantom	Sexton Devasia	
2002	Oomappenninu Uriyadappayyan	Punchiri Pushparaj	
2002	Mazhathullikkilukkam	Mathukutty	
2002	Kunjikoonan	Thoma	
2002	Kaiyethum Doorath	Kundara Sharangan	
2002	Chirikkudukka	Sathyavan	
2002	Bamboo Boys	Makku	
2002	Meesa Madhavan	Thrivikraman	
2002	Kasthooriman	Philipose Uncle	
2002	Kattuchembakam	Kankani Rajappan	
2002	Kannaki	Ravunni	
2002	Bucket	Shilpa	
2002	Ee Bhargavinilayam		
2002	www.anukudumbam.com		
2003	Relax	Ganesh	
2003	Thilakkam	Bhaskaran	
2003	Kilichundan Mampazham	Kalanthan Haji	
2003	Sadanandante Samayam	Headmaster Chacko	
2003	Vellithira	Panchayath President	
2003	C.I.D. Moosa	Vikraman	
2003	Meerayude Dukhavum Muthuvinte Swapnavum	Divakaran	
2003	Swapnakoodu	Philipose	
2003	Hariharan Pillai Happy Aanu	Velappan	
2003	Valathottu Thirinjal Nalamathe Veedu	Bullet Ismail	
2003	Pulival Kalyanam	Dharmendra	
2003	Malsaram	Bhaskaran	
2003	Pattanathil Sundaran	Shekhara Pillai	
2004	Kerala House Udan Vilpanakku	Vadival Vasu	
2004	C. I. Mahadevan 5 Adi 4 Inchu	Mahadevan	
2004	Vismayathumbathu	Nandakumar	
2004	Chathikkatha Chanthu	Dharma	
2004	Runway	Divakaran	
2004	Vettam	Kurup	
2004	Maratha Nadu		
2004	Ee Snehatheerathu	Neelan	
2004	Ennittum	Professor Villas	
2004	Youth Festival	Kannappan	
2004	Mampazhakkalam	Manathudi Madhavan	
2004	Vesham	Adv. Chithrabhanu	
2004	Vellinakshatram	CI Velayudhan	Cameo
2004	Vacation	Urumees	
2005	Udayananu Tharam	'Sona' Balan	
2005	Chandrolsavam	Sreedharan	
2005	Daivanamathil		
2005	Iruvattam Manavaatti	Ambujakshan/ Ambiyannan	
2005	Pandippada	Ummachan	
2005	Nerariyan CBI	George C. Nair	
2005	Chiratta Kalippattangal		
2005	Ben Johnson	ASI Eenashu	
2005	Immini Nalloraal	Sub Inspector	
2005	Rajamanikyam	Varghese	
2005	Anandabhadram	Maravi Mathai	
2006	Vargam	A.S.I Gopala Krishna Pilla	
2006	Kilukkam Kilukilukkam	Appukuttan / Annamma	
2006	Madhuchandralekha	Abootty	
2006	Thuruppugulan	Raman Kartha	
2006	Keerthi Chakra	Nairettan	
2006	The Don		
2006	Aanachandam	Pulikkathara	
2006	Janmam		
2006	Lion	Vendor Chandy	
2006	Chakkaramuthu	Kumarettan	
2006	Red Salute	Hamsa Koya	
2006	Badadosth	Javed	
2007	Rathri Mazha		
2007	Changathipoocha	Vattu Bhargavan	
2007	Chotta Mumbai	Vasuttan	
2007	Inspector Garud	Gopalan	
2007	July 4	Abukka alias Abu	
2007	Mayavi	Jailor	
2007	Panthaya Kozhi	Parunthu Bhaskaran	
2007	Paradeshi	Head Constable	
2007	Detective	Shivaraman	
2007	Heart Beats	Plaparabil Inashu	
2007	Kichamani MBA	Jinnah	
2007	Romeo	Ratheesh Kumar	
2007	Avan Chandiyude Makan	Chackochi	
2007	Indrajith	Udumbu Rudrakshan	
2007	Ali Bhai	Kunji Kannan	
2008	Mayakazhcha	Kilippadan	
2008	Twenty:20	Peruchazhi Vasu	
2008	Parunthu	Kunjachan	
2008	Bullet	Uttaman Vellayani	
2008	Kurukshetra	Havildar	
2009	Loudspeaker	Organ agent Sarangadharan	
2009	Changathikoottam	Pathrose	
2009	Colours	Rahul's father	
2009	Hailesa	Police Inspector Pothuval	
2009	Venalmaram	Achuthankutty	

===== 2010s =====
Year	Title	Role	Notes
2010	3 Char Sau Bees		
2010	Body Guard	Principal	
2011	Kalabha Mazha		Posthumous release
2013	Musafir	GK	Posthumous release
2015	3 Wicketinu 365 Runs		Posthumous release

==== Tamil films ====
Year	Title	Role	Notes
1988	Paasa Paravaigal	Dhanraj	
1988	Paadatha Thenikkal	Killer	
1990	Pagalil Pournami	Hotel Manager	
1990	Mounam Sammadham	Kallupatti Rangan	
1990	Vaigasi Poranthachu	Malaiyappan	
1991	Gopura Vasalile		
1991	Vaasalil Oru Vennila	Singer	
1992	Vaaname Ellai	M.R.T.	
1992	Mahanadi	Dhanush	
1996	Siraichalai	Ahmmed Kutty	
1998	Thulli Thirintha Kaalam	Nair	
1998	Kaathala Kaathala	Vikadananda	
1999	Adutha Kattam		
1999	Kakkai Siraginile	Kanmani's father	
1999	Suyamvaram	Paandi	
1999	Mudhalvan	Chinnasamy	
2000	Mugavaree	Director	
2001	Citizen	Manmadha Kutty	
2002	Youth	Dhanushkodi	
2002	Maaran	C.B.I officer Madanagopal	
2002	Paarthale Paravasam		
2003	Lesa Lesa	Kailasam	
2003	Parthiban Kanavu		
2003	Nadhi Karaiyinile		
2004	Vaanam Vasappadum		
2004	Attahasam	Swapna's father	
2005	Anniyan	Delinquent car owner	
2005	Thotti Jaya		
2005	Chanakya	MLA	
2005	Kasthuri Maan		
2006	Pattiyal	Saamy	
2006	Suyetchai MLA		
2006	Unakkum Enakkum	Ravichandran	
2007	Madurai Veeran	Teacher	
2007	Deepavali	Sait	
2007	Sivaji: The Boss	A. Kuzhandhaivel	
2007	Kireedam	Chellapandi	
2007	Sringaram		
2008	Theekuchi	Kasi	
2008	Tharagu	Kanmani's assistant	
2008	Arai En 305-il Kadavul	Giri Chettan	
2008	Jeyam Kondaan	Kasi	
2008	Poi Solla Porom	Vijayakumar	
2008	Aegan	Hanifa	
2009	A Aa E Ee	Vedachalam	
2009	Modhi Vilayadu	Chanakya	
2009	Vettaikaran	Complex Owner	
2010	Kattradhu Kalavu	Vaikavardhan	Posthumous release
2010	Ambasamudram Ambani	Nandhini's father	Posthumous release
2010	Madrasapattinam	Nambi	Posthumous release
2010	Enthiran	Traffic police officer	Posthumous release
2010	Thottu Paar		Posthumous release

==== Hindi films ====
Year	Title	Role	Notes
1988	New Delhi		
1993	Gardish	Bank robber	
2010	No Problem	Dr. Ramacharya	

==== Telugu films ====
Year	Title	Role	Notes
2007	Julayi	Gopalakrishna	
2010	Puli	Al Saleem's PA	Posthumous release
2010	Thakita Thakita	Alagappan	Posthumous release

=== As director ===
Malayalam Films

- Bheesmacharya (1994)
- Vatsalyam (1993)
- Veena Meettiya Vilangukal (1990)
- Aankiliyude Tharattu (1987)
- Oru Sindoora Pottinte Ormaykku (1987)
- Moonnu Masangalkku Munpu (1986)
- Oru Sandesam Koodi (1985)

Tamil films

- Paasa Paravaigal (1988)
- Paadatha Thenikkal (1988)
- Pagalil Pournami (1990)
- Pillai Paasam (1991)
- Vaasalile Oru Vennila (1991)
- Naalai Engal Kalyanam (later released as Kadalora Kaadhal)

=== As writer ===
- Aval Oru Devaalayam (1977) (Directed by A.B. Raj)
- Adima Changala (1981) (Directed by A.B. Raj)
- Ithihasam (1981)
- Chicagoyil Cheenthiya Raktham
- Aarambham (1982) (Directed by Joshi)
- Dheera (1982) (Directed by Joshi)
- Thaalam Thettiya Tharattu (1983) (Directed by A.B. Raj)
- Sandharbham (1984) (Directed by Joshi)
- Inakkilly (1984) (Directed by Joshi)
- Piriyilla Naam (1984) (Directed by Joshi)
- Parayanumvayya Parayathirikkanumvayya (1985) (Directed by Priyadarshan)
- Puthiya Karukkal (1989) (Directed by Thampi Kannanthanam)
- Lal Americayil (1989) (Directed by Sathyan Anthikkad)
- Kadathanadan Ambadi (1990) (Directed by Priyadarshan)
- Bheesmacharya (1994) (Directed by himself)
- Gandeevam (1994) (Telugu film, story only; directed by Priyadarshan)
- Mission (2010)
