= Walayar =

- Town
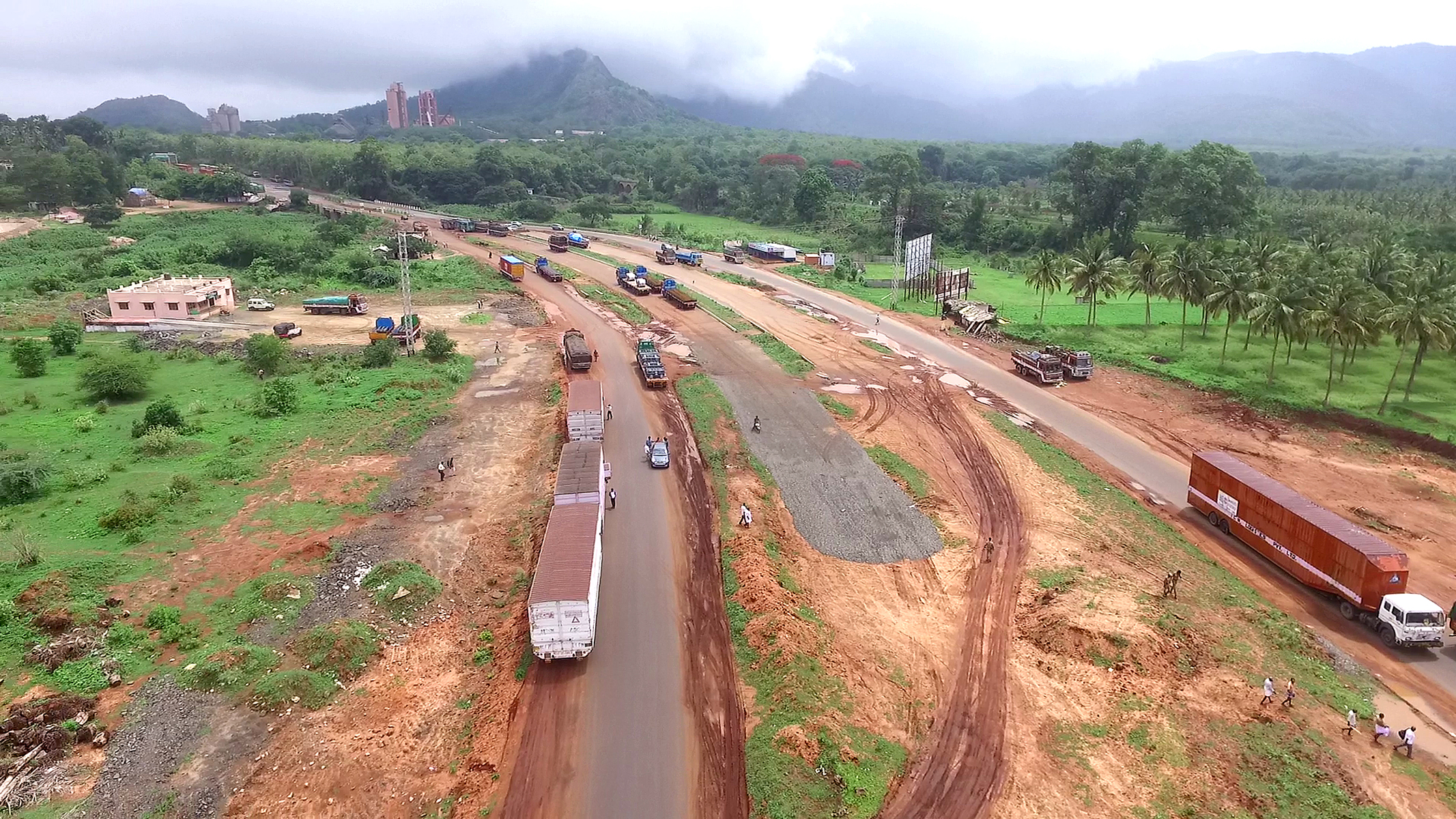
- Walayar aerial view

- Location in Kerala, India Walayar (India)
- Coordinates: 10.8428°N 76.8388°E
- Country: India
- State: Kerala
- District: Palakkad District

Languages
  - Official: Malayalam, English
- Time zone: UTC+5:30 (IST)
- PIN: 678624
- Telephone code: 04915
- Vehicle registration: KL-09
- Nearest city: Palakkad, Coimbatore
- Lok Sabha constituency: Palakkad
- Climate: Tropical monsoon (Köppen)
- Avg. summer temperature: 40 °C (104 °F)
- Avg. winter temperature: 20 °C (68 °F)

Walayar is a border town, located in the eastern corner of Palakkad district in Kerala, India.

== Geography ==
Walayar lies on the border between Kerala and Tamil Nadu on National Highway 544 (NH544) (NH 47 old).

Most of the goods imported into Kerala come by road and predominantly on this road. Due to its traffic volume, the route once had notorious traffic jams. But this changed with the improvement of NH 47 from Walayar to Vadakkanchery. It now has four lanes, with service roads and other facilities. There is an exclusive service road for goods vehicles from the entry point of the check post to the exit point so that passenger vehicles can easily pass through the check post area without any interruption. Widening of NH 47 completed in 2015. Most of the passenger vehicles from other states, such as buses, tourist cabs, and pilgrims, enter Kerala through this gateway. Walayar is considered the Gateway of Kerala from mainland India.

== Checkposts ==
Commercial tax (previously sales tax) check post, motor vehicles check post, forest, rinderpest, and excise check posts are located there.

The commercial taxes checkpost has the most officials and brings the most revenue to the state. It is one of the 10 biggest check posts in India, with nearly 200 officials. The other checkposts have fewer than 40. Commercial taxes comprise 76% of the state exchequer.

== Economy ==
Exporting timber also is a major occupation.

Malabar Cements Ltd, a public sector undertaking owned by the Kerala government. It produces grey cement.

== Deer park ==
Jayaprakash Narayan Smrithivanam deer park sits beside NH 47. The park spreads over 110 acres of forested area. It mainly a teak plantation, started in 1997. It was recognized by the Zoo Authority with plans to convert it as a Safari Park with more amenities for deer, other animals and for visitors. The park is located 22 km from Palakkad.

The park is the main entry to the main tourist centres of the District, like Malampuzha, Kanjirapuzha, Nelliampathy, Silent Valley and the Mangalam Dam.

== Transportation ==
This town connects to other parts of India through Palakkad. National Highway No.544 connects to Coimbatore and Bangalore. Other parts of Kerala are accessed through National Highway No.66.through Thrissur.

Coimbatore International Airport is the nearest airport, about 43 km away.

Bus number 96 connects Walayar with Coimbatore Gandhipuram Town Bus Stand.

Walayar has a railway station, about 100 meters from NH 47. Palakkad Junction railway station is the nearest major railway station.
