= Pandippada =

- DVD poster
- Directed by: Rafi-Mecartin
- Written by: Rafi Mecartin
- Produced by: Dileep; Anoop
- Starring: Dileep; Navya Nair; Prakash Raj; Rajan P Dev
- Narrated by: Dileep
- Cinematography: Saloo George
- Edited by: Harihara Puthran
- Music by: Suresh Peters (Songs); S. P. Venkatesh(background score)
- Production company: Graand Production
- Distributed by: Kalasangham Films; Wrights Releases; Kas
- Release date: 4 July 2005 (Kerala)
- Running time: 150 minutes
- Country: India
- Language: Malayalam

Pandippada (transl. Pandi gang) is a 2005 Indian Malayalam action comedy film written and directed by Rafi Mecartin. The film stars Dileep in the lead role while Navya Nair, Prakash Raj, Rajan P. Dev, Harisree Ashokan, Salim Kumar, Cochin Haneefa, and Indrans play supporting roles. The film was produced by Dileep and Anoop under the company Graand Production. The film was commercially successful at box office, becoming one of the highest-grossing films of 2005 and developed a cult following.

The film released on 4 July 2005. The story revolves around Bhuvana Chandran (Dileep), a struggling entrepreneur in a lot of debt, who gets involved in a land conflict between two powerful men related by marriage in Tamil Nadu, Pandi Durai (Prakash Raj) and Karuppayya Swami (Rajan P. Dev). Meanwhile, he lands himself as a close confidante of Durai and falls in a love triangle inspired from Twelfth Night.

== Plot ==
Pandi Durai and his brother-in-law Karuppayya Swami are two rival landlords in Tamil Nadu, illiterate yet equally feared by the villagers for their brutalities. Bhuvanachandran is an unsuccessful entrepreneur from Kerala who mistakenly buys a piece of land in the same village. He has many debts and must sell the land to clear them. However, Pandi and Karuppayya have not allowed any owner of the land to sell it, Bhuvan being the latest owner to land in trouble.

Bhuvan, unaware of the situation stemming from the feud, comes to this village to check the possibilities of selling the land. Then he gets help from his best friend Bhasi, who lives there. Bhasi takes him to Pandi, for whom he works, and Bhuvan joins Pandi's group, named Pandippada, soon becoming a close confidante to Pandi. Later, Karuppayya's beautiful, literate, well-mannered daughter Meena falls in love with Bhuvan.

However, Pandi also wants to marry Meena, and this makes Pandi and Bhuvan enemies. Pandi tries to kill Bhuvan, but the latter escapes. Karuppayya finds Bhuvan a better suitor than Pandi and fixes the marriage of Meena and Bhuvan. Pandi also fixes his marriage with Meena on the same date. In the chaos that follows, Bhuvan confronts Pandi in a duel and almost defeats him, but hesitates from doing so because he has grown to love and respect Pandi. He gives Pandi a gun and asks him to shoot him if he cannot see him as a brother. Realizing his mistakes, Pandi surrenders to the police and promises to return as a better man, while giving his blessing to Bhuvan and Meena.

== Cast ==
- Dileep as Bhuvanachandran (Bhuvan)
- Navya Nair as Meena, Karuppayya's daughter and Bhuvan's love interest
- Prakash Raj as Pandi Durai, Karuppayya's brother-in-law
- Harisree Asokan as Bhasi, Bhuvan's best friend
- Salim Kumar as Umakanthan, Bhuvan's best friend
- Cochin Haneefa as Ummachan
- Rajan P. Dev as Karuppayya Swami (Kuruppayya), Meena's father and Pandi Durai's brother-law
- Ambika as Mallika, Karuppayya's wife and Pandi Durai's sister
- Sukumari as Pandi Durai's and Mallika's Mother
- Indrans as Veeramani
- Sabu Jacob as Kaali, Pandi Durai's henchman (Voice over by Shobi Thilakan)
- T. P. Madhavan as Chandran Pilla, Bhuvanachandran's father
- Zeenath as Omana, Bhuvanachandran's mother
- Subbalakshmi as Meena's grandmother
- Kalabhavan Haneef as Chimbu
- Neena Kurup as Suma, Bhuvanachandran's sister
- Kollam Ajith as Murugan, Karuppayya Swami's henchman
- Kalabhavan Shajon as Raghavan
- Geetha Salam as Broker
- Baiju Ezhupunna as Gounder
- Narayanankutty as Police Officer
- Nandu Poduval as Tattoo Artist
- Soubin Shahir as Peacock Man in the function (uncredited role)

== Soundtrack ==
The music was composed by Suresh Peters, with lyrics written by Chittoor Gopi, R. K. Damodaran, I. S. Kundoor, Nadirsha and Santhosh Varma.

No.	Song	Singers	Lyrics	Length (m:ss)
1	"Ariyaathe Ishtamaay" (D)	V. Devanand, Jyotsna	Chittoor Gopi	
2	"Ariyaathe Ishtamaay" (F)	Jyotsna	Chittoor Gopi	
3	"Ariyaathe Ishtamaay" (M)	V. Devanand	Chittoor Gopi	
4	"Mayilin"	Sujatha Mohan, Afsal, Vidhu Prathap	R. K. Damodaran	
5	"Mayilin" (Remix)	Sujatha Mohan, Afsal, Vidhu Prathap	R. K. Damodaran	
6	"Mele Mukilin"	K. S. Chithra, Afsal	R. K. Damodaran	
7	"Panchaayathile"	Sujatha Mohan, Afsal	Nadirsha	
8	"Ponkanavu Minukkum"	Mano, Ranjini Jose, Timmi	Santhosh Varma, I S Kundanoor	

== Reception ==
The film was commercially successful in the box office and ran more than 100 days in theaters. It has been remade into Telugu as Poola Rangadu (2012) and in Kannada as Cool Ganesha (2013).
