= Rafi–Mecartin =

Indian Malayalam film directors and writers

Rafi and Mecartin
- Occupations: Screenwriter; Film Director; Actor
- Years active: 1992 – present
- Relatives: Shafi (brother of Rafi); Siddique (uncle of Rafi)

Rafi and Mecartin are a screenwriter and director duo best known for comedy films in Malayalam cinema.

They have scripted and directed successful films such as Puthukkottayile Puthumanavalan (1995), Superman (1997), Punjabi House (1998), Thenkasipattanam (2000), Chathikkatha Chanthu (2004), Pandippada (2005), and Hallo (2007). The duo has also written the scripts for Aniyan Bava Chetan Bava (1995), Aadyathe Kanmani (1995), Dilliwala Rajakumaran (1996), Kusruthi Kuruppu (1998), One Man Show (2001), Thilakkam (2003), and Mayavi (2007) among others, for other directors.

== Filmography ==
=== Director ===
Year	Title	Notes
1995	Puthukkottayile Puthumanavalan	
1997	Superman	
1998	Punjabi House	
2000	Sathyam Sivam Sundaram	
2000	Thenkasipattanam	
2002	Thenkasi Pattanam	Tamil film
2004	Chathikkatha Chanthu	
2005	Pandippada	
2007	Hallo	
2009	Love In Singapore	
2011	China Town	
2014	Ring Master^{⊥}	
2017	Role Models^{⊥}	
2023	Voice Of Sathyanathan^{⊥}	

^{⊥} Rafi alone

=== Screenwriter only ===
Year	Film	Writer
1992	Ellarum Chollanu	Yes
1992	Mr & Mrs	Yes
1995	Aniyan Bava Chetan Bava	Yes
1995	Aadyathe Kanmani	Screenplay, dialogue
1996	Dilliwala Rajakumaran	Yes
1997	The Car	Story
1998	Kusruthi Kuruppu	Yes
2001	One Man Show	Yes
2003	Thilakkam	Yes
2007	Romeo	Yes
2007	Mayavi	Yes
2015	Two Countries^{⊥}	Rafi
2019	Children's Park^{⊥}	Yes
2024	Once Upon a Time in Kochi^{⊥}	Yes
2024	Thaanara^{⊥}	Yes

^{⊥} Rafi alone

==== Assistant director ====
- Godfather (1991)
- Vietnam Colony (1993)
- Customs Diary (1993)

=== Acting credits of Rafi ===
Year	Film	Role	Notes
1995	Puthukkottayile Puthumanavalan		Guest appearance
2014	Ring Master	Director Ravishankar	
2015	Villali Veeran	Aiswarya's uncle	
2015	Two Countries	Daniel	
2016	Shajahanum Pareekuttiyum	Joseph	
2017	Role Models	Dr Krishnadev	
2017	Sherlock Toms	Saghav Lazar	
2018	Vikadakumaran	Magistrate Solomon Mathew Puthanpallil	
2018	Sakalakalashala		
2019	Children's Park	Adv. Thomas Augustine	
2019	Ganagandharvan	Samson	
2020	Shylock	Director & Film Producer Chacko	
2022	Naradan	Pillachettan	
2024	Thundu	CPO Raghavan	
2024	Adios Amigo	Paul Kurian	
2024	ED: Extra Decent	Dr Ajmal Khan	
2024	Rifle Club	Adv. Koshi	
2025	Odum Kuthira Chaadum Kuthira	Dr. Rafi Kuttikattil	

=== Acting credits of Mecartin ===
- Sathyam Sivam Sundaram (2000)
