= Nedumudi Venu filmography =

Nedumudi Venu (22 May 1948 – 11 October 2021) was an Indian Malayalam actor known for his performances in Manichitrathazhu (1993), Indian (1996), Anniyan (2005), Malootty (1990), Keli (1991), and many others.

== Malayalam language films ==
=== 1970s ===
List of 1970s Malayalam film credits
Year	Title	Role	Notes
1972	Oru Sundariyude Kadha	College students hostel in dance team	
1978	Thampu		
1978	Aaravam	Maruthu	
1979	Thakara	Chellappanasari	

=== 1980s ===
List of 1980s Malayalam film credits
Year	Title	Role	Notes
1980	Cheriyachante Kroorakrithyangal	Father	
1980	Sooryante Maranum	Aditya	
1980	Aarohanam	Gopi	Also wrote screenplay and dialogues
1980	Manjil Virinja Pookkal	Seythalavi	
1980	Chamaram	Father	
1980	Chamayam	Unni	
1980	Venal		
1981	Tharattu	Venu	
1981	Prema Geethangal	Johnson	
1981	Oridathoru Phayalvaan	Mesthiri	
1981	Ilaneer	Babu	
1981	Thenum Vayambum	Ravi	
1981	Kallan Pavithran	Pavithran	
1981	Chaatta	Bhairavan	
1981	Parankimala	Velu Annan/Kottuvadi	
1981	Swarnappakshikal	Ravi	
1981	Vida Parayum Munpe	Xavier	
1981	Kolangal	Paramu	
1981	Dhanya		
1981	Swapnaraagam		Unreleased
1981	Yakshikkaavu		Unreleased
1981	Palangal	Ramankutty	
1982	Chillu	Jose George	
1982	Football	Sam	
1982	Ente Mohangal Poovaninju	Damu	
1982	Kaaliya Mardhanam	Sreeni	
1982	Ponnum Poovum	Dasan	
1982	Enikkum Oru Divasam	Vasu	
1982	Gaanam	Ganapathy	
1982	Komaram		
1982	Yavanika	Balagopalan	
1982	Kelkatha Shabdam	Devan	
1982	Amrutha Geetham	Mohan	
1982	Marmaram	Narayana Iyer	
1982	Alolam	Thampuran	
1982	Snehapoorvam Meera	Krishnankutty	
1982	Njan Onnu Parayatte	Charlie	
1982	Ilakkangal	Unni	
1982	Vaarikuzhi	Unni	
1982	Kattile Pattu	Chinnan	
1982	Ormakkayi	Balu	
1982	Kanmanikkorumma		
1983	Aaroodam	Das	
1983	Kingini Kombu		
1983	Kinnaram	Unni	
1983	Prem Nazirine Kanmanilla	As Himself	
1983	Asthram	Krishnanunni	
1983	Lekhayude Maranam Oru Flashback		
1983	Rachana	K Achuthanunni	
1983	Oru Swakaryam	Shivankuttty	
1983	Parasparam	Jagadish	
1983	Aashrayam		
1983	Onnu Chirikku	Dr. George	
1983	Veena Poovu	Vasudevan	
1983	Eettillam	Vijayan	
1983	Vaashi		
1983	Enikku Vishakunnu	Chacko	
1983	Aadhipathyam	Anthony	
1983	Naseema	Ravi	
1983	Saagaram Santham	Raghavan	
1983	Mandanmmar Londanil	Vaasu	
1984	Uyarangalil	Johnny	
1984	Ithiri Poove Chuvannapoove	Potty	
1984	Oru Kochukatha Aarum Parayatha Katha	Aravindan	
1984	Appunni	Appunni	
1984	Mangalam Nerunnu	Menon	
1984	Oru Kochu Swapnam	Venu	
1984	Parannu Parannu Parannu	Vakkachan	
1984	Odaruthammava Aalariyam	Major Nair	
1984	Poochakkoru Mookkuthi	Ravunni Menon	
1984	Aarorumariyathe	Govindankutty	
1984	Ente Upasana	Lathika's uncle	
1984	Veruthe Oru Pinakkam	Ravi	
1984	Aayiram Abhilashangal		
1984	Panchavadi Palam	Sikhandi Pillai	
1984	Manasariyathe	Venu	
1984	Sandyakkenthinu Sindhooram	Venu	
1984	Akkare	Johnny	
1984	Kaliyil Alpam Karyam	Drunk Neighbour	
1984	Nokkethadhoorathu Kannum Nattu	Father	
1985	Kathodu Kathoram	Father	
1985	Oru Naal Innoru Naal	Vasu	
1985	Principal Olivil	MA Babu MA	
1985	Ee Lokam Ivide Kure Manushyar	Master	
1985	Oru Kudakeezhil	Venukuttan Nair	
1985	Mutharamkunnu P.O.	Kuttan Pillai	
1985	Ee Thanalil Ithiri Nerum	Adv. Menon	
1985	Akkare Ninnoru Maran	Sree Thankappan Nair (Ammavan)	
1985	Puli Varunne Puli	Ramadas	
1985	Guruji Oru Vakku	Charly	
1985	Ambada Njaane!	Muthachan	
1985	Iniyum Katha Thudarum	Moidu	
1985	Punnaram Cholli Cholli	Shivaraman	
1985	Onathumbikkoru Oonjaal		
1985	Irakal	Andrews	
1985	Oru Sandesam Koodi	Prasad	
1985	Oduvil Kittiya Vartha		
1985	Azhiyatha Bandhangal	Unnikrishnan	
1985	Paara		
1985	Thozhil Allengil Jail		
1985	Kaiyum Thlayum Purathidaruthe	Panchayath Secretary	
1985	Oru Kochu Kaaryam		Unreleased
1986	Adiverukal		
1986	Sukhamo Devi	Dr Venugopal	
1986	Ayalvasi Oru Daridravasi	Sasidharan	
1986	Moonnu Masangalku Mumbu	Dr. Unnikrishnan	
1986	Ashtabandham	Kunjunni	
1986	Atham Chithira Chothi	Mukundan	
1986	Kaveri	Kunjunni	
1986	Pranamam	Usha's father	
1986	Panchagni	Shivaraman	
1986	Rareeram	Venugopal	
1986	Mizhineerppoovukal	Ayilyam thirunal Kumara Varma Thamburan	
1986	Oru Katha Oru Nunakkatha	Appu Nair	
1986	Meenamasathile Sooryan	Pokkayi	
1986	Doore Doore Oru Koodu Koottam	Kunjan Nair	
1986	Chilambu	Sahadevan	
1986	Chekkeranoru Chilla	Govindan	
1986	Oru Yugasandhya	Gopalan	
1986	Akalangalil	Sethu	
1986	Pappan Priyappetta Pappan	SI Kochappu	
1986	Chidambaram	Himself	
1986	Dheem Tharikida Thom	Keerikkad Chellappan Nair	
1986	Katturumbinum Kathu Kuthu	Shekharan	
1986	Sunil Vayassu 20	Military Fernandez	
1986	Thalavattam	Dr. Unni Krishnan	
1986	Ponnum Kudathinum Pottu	Dasan	
1986	Love Story	Kumaran Nair/Radhakrishnan	
1986	Ennennum Kannettante	Tharavadu Karanavar	
1986	Ambili Ammavan		
1986	Arappatta Kettiya Gramathil	Gopi	
1986	Oru Maymasa Pulariyil		
1986	Onnu Muthal Poojyam Vare	Dr. K K Menon	
1987	Swathi Thirunal	Iraiyamman Tampi	
1987	Oru Minnaminunginte Nurunguvettam	Ravunni Nair	
1987	Naradhan Keralathil	Naradhan	
1987	Kanikanum Neram	Sethu	
1987	Manja Manthrangal	Professor Varma	
1987	Neela Kurinji Poothappol	Sivaramakrishnan Nair	
1987	Sruthi	Thampuran	
1987	Theertham	Vishnu Namboothiri	
1987	Thoranam	Gopi	
1987	Achuvettante Veedu	Achuthankutty Nair	
1987	Rithubhedam	Krishnanunni	
1987	Kaiyethum Dhoorathu	Prabhakaran	
1987	Oridathu	Sundaresan	
1987	Kilippattu		
1987	Ezhuthapurangal	Balakrishna Menon	
1987	Janangalude Shradhakku	Vasu Pillai	
1987	Varshangal Poyathariyathe		
1987	Sarvakalashala	Siddhan Aashan	
1987	Kathakku Pinnil	Sukumara Pillai	
1987	Cheppu	Prof Varkey	
1987	Archana Pookal		
1988	Marikkunnilla Njan		
1988	Daisy	Pradeep's uncle	
1988	Orkkapurathu	Nicholas	
1988	Aranyakam	Saleema's grandfather	
1988	Adholokam	Peter	
1988	Padamudra		
1988	Vicharana	Ramettan	
1988	Ayitham	Rangan	
1988	Onninu Purake Mattonnu	Father	
1988	Unnikrishnante Adyathe Christmas	Ittichan	
1988	Vaishali	Rajaguru	
1988	Sanghunadam	DYSP Mohandas	
1988	Dhwani	Shekharan	
1988	Isabella	Tourist Guide	
1988	Witness	Himself	
1988	Chithram	Kaimal	
1988	Ore Thooval Pakshikal		
1988	Mukunthetta Sumitra Vilikkunnu	Kumaran Nair	
1988	Vellanakalude Naadu	Minister	Cameo
1988	Mrithunjayam	Jayachandra Gounder	
1989	Swagatham	Devan Nair	
1989	Oru Sayahnathinte Swapnam	Dr. Kuriakose	
1989	Nagarangalil Chennu Raparkam	Kunjoottan's father	
1989	Najangalude Kochu Doctor	Kunjoottan's father	
1989	Alicinte Anveshanam		
1989	Devadas		
1989	Pooram	Chellappan Pillai	Debut as a writer and director
1989	Dasharatham	Scariah	
1989	Vadakkunokkiyantram	Doctor	
1989	Rugmini		
1989	Chakkikotha Chankaran	Prabhakaran Thampi	
1989	Eenam Maranna Kaattu		Unreleased
1989	Pandu Pandoru Desathu		Unreleased
1989	Vachanam	Lawyer	
1989	Vandanam	Kurian Fernandez	
1989	Varnatheru	Alex	
1989	Anagha	Sugathan	

=== 1990s ===
List of 1990s Malayalam film credits
Year	Title	Role	Notes
1990	Malootty	Raghavan	
1990	Dr. Pasupathy	Perumpilavu Unnikannan Nair	
1990	Ee Thanutha Veluppan Kalathu	Warrier	
1990	Appu	Chandikunju Asan	
1990	Akkare Akkare Akkare	Sivadasa Menon	
1990	Vidhyarambham	Madhavan Ezhuthachan	
1990	His Highness Abdullah	Udaya Varma	
1990	Kshanakkathu	Tuition Teacher	
1990	Ammayude Swantham Kunju Mary		
1990	Champion Thomas	Madhavan	
1990	Bhoomika	Rama Warrier	
1990	Lal Salam	Father Felix	
1991	Kadavu	The Anchorite	
1991	Nettippattam	Kumaran	
1991	Santhwanam	Rajasekaran Thambi	
1991	Yamanam		
1991	Oru Tharam Randu Tharam Moonu Tharam	Govinda Kurup	
1991	Vishnulokam	Govinda Kurup	
1991	Perumthachan	Unni Thampuran	
1991	Bharatham	Kalloor Ramanathan / Raman	
1991	Keli	'Romance' Kumaran	
1991	Uncle Bun	Jameskutty Chacko / Kuttichan	
1991	Aavanikunnile Kinnaripookkal	Balan Menon	
1991	Dhanam	Rajappan	
1991	Venal Kinavukal	Ventaka Roa	
1991	Kizhakkunarum Pakshi	Varma	
1991	Mukha Chithram	Fr. Felix	
1992	Apaaratha	KP Menon	
1992	Soorya Gayathri	Manisankar Iyer	
1992	Vietnam Colony	Moosa Settu	
1992	Rajashilpi	Madhavan	
1992	Ponnaramthottathe Raajaavu		
1992	Kingini		
1992	Pandu Pandoru Rajakumari	Balan Nambyar	
1992	Sargam	Haridas' father	
1992	Kamaladalam	Velayudhan	
1992	Savidham		
1992	Champakulam Thachan		
1992	Sadayam	Father Dominic	
1992	Poochakkaru Mani Kettum	Ambujakshan Nair (Ambotty)	
1992	Kunjikuruvi		
1992	Aham		
1992	Kalippattam	Freddy Uncle	
1992	Aalavattam	Kesavankutty	
1992	Snehasagaram		
1993	Bhoomi Geetham	Balan mashu	
1993	Manichitrathazhu	Thampy	
1993	Maya Mayooram	Narendran (Appu) and Krishnan Unni (Unni)	
1993	Ponnu Chami		
1993	Akashadoothu	Fr. Vattappara	
1993	Golanthara Vartha	Hassan	
1993	Padheyam	Kunjikannan Nair	
1993	Samooham	Balan Poduval	
1993	Oru Kadankatha Pole	Shekhara Warrior	Story by
1993	Aagneyam	Mathew Stephan	
1993	Devasuram	Appu master	
1993	Ezhuthachan		Unreleased
1993	Aalavattam	Keshavan Nair	
1993	Kabooliwala	Ameer	
1993	Samagamam	Fr. Puthenthara	
1993	Mithunam	Cherkkonam Swamy	
1993	Ghazal	Alikkutty	
1994	Chanakya Soothrangal	P N Venugopala Varma	
1994	Nandini Oppol		
1994	Rajadhani	Panikker	
1994	Shudhamaddalam		
1994	Thenmavin Kombath	Sreekrishnan Thampuran	
1994	Pavithram	Warrier	
1994	Parinayam	Aphan Namboothiri	
1994	Saaraamsham		
1994	Shudhamaddalam		
1995	Ormakalundayirikkanam	Nambiar	
1995	Agrajan	Malayala Bhoomi P.T Joseph	
1995	Alancheri Thamprakkal	Chathukutti Bhagavathar	
1995	Nirnayam	Fr Thayyil	
1995	Thacholi Varghese Chekavar	Father	
1995	Sreeragam	Periya Shasthri	
1995	Spadikam	Ravunni Master	
1995	Manikya Chempazhukka		
1995	Saakshyam		
1995	Sundari Neeyum Sundaran Njanum		
1996	Devaraagam	Shankaran	
1996	Kaalapani	Sreekandan Nair	
1996	Sammohanam	Ummini	
1996	Udhyanapalakan	Gopalettan	
1996	Kunkumacheppu	Vakkeel Uncle	
1996	Kazhakam		
1996	Rajaputhran	MK Nair	
1997	Itha Oru Snehagatha		
1997	Swarnachamaram	Appu Nair	Unreleased
1997	Poonilamazha	Dr. Balagopal	
1997	Manthra Mothiram	Warrior	
1997	Oru Yathramozhi	Appu	
1997	Ishtadanam	Dhanapalan	
1997	Guru	Teacher	
1997	Chandralekha	Udhaya Varma	
1997	Mangamma	Nair	
1997	Karunyam	Sukumaran	
1997	Itha Oru Snehagatha		
1997	Churam	Balagopalan	
1997	Snehasindooram	Sankaran	
1997	Janmadinam		
1997	Superman	Raman Nair	
1997	Manasam	Menon	
1997	Vaachalam	Mash	
1998	Manjukalavum Kazhinju		
1998	Thirakalkkappuram		
1998	Daya	The Sultan	
1998	Oru Maravathoor Kanavu	Palanichaamy	
1998	Thattakam		
1998	Sidhartha	Karunakara Menon	
1998	Ayal Kadha Ezhuthukayanu	Dr Subhash	
1998	Sundarakilladi	Rajamanikkam	
1998	Rakthasakshikal Sindabad	Annan	
1998	Harikrishnans	Thampuran	
1998	Chinthavishtayaya Shyamala	The Headmaster	
1999	Thachiledathu Chundan	Vasukutty	
1999	Pallavur Devanarayanan	Aasan	
1999	English Medium	Sankunni Nair	
1999	Angene Oru Avadhikkalathu	Delhi Pappachan	
1999	Veendum Chila Veettukaryangal	Aravindan	
1999	Devadasi		
1999	Pranaya Nilavu	Madhavan Nair	
1999	Stalin Sivadas	CG	
1999	Rishivamsam		
1999	Garshom	Subair	
1999	Megham	Meenakshi's father	

=== 2000s ===
List of 2000s Malayalam film credits
Year	Title	Role	Notes
2000	Life Is Beautiful	Principal	
2000	Aanamuttathe Aangalamar	Sivasankara Menon	
2000	Cover Story	Chandrashekara Menon	
2000	Susanna	Colonel Ramachandran Nair	
2000	Madhuranombarakattu	Bhagavathar	
2000	Mister Butler	Radhika's father	
2000	Puraskaram		
2000	Madhumaasam		
2000	Thamburaan		
2001	Nalacharitham Naalam Divasam	Paapputty	
2001	Ishtam	Krishnankutty Menon	
2001	Randam Bhavam	Kuruppu	
2001	Saivar Thirumeni	Devan's grandfather	
2001	Ladies & Gentlemen	Fernandez	
2001	Dubai	Swaminathan	
2001	Kakkakuyil	Thampuran	
2001	Uthaman	Kochantony	
2001	Jeevan Masai		
2001	Saari		
2001	Raavanaprabhu	Photo Archieve	
2002	Phantom	Gandhi Pillai	
2002	Mazhathullikkilukkam	Father Palaykkal	
2002	Kanmashi		
2002	Kuttappan Sakshi		
2002	Kunjikoonan	Prasad's father	
2002	Thandavam	Swaminathan	
2002	Yathrakarude Sradhakku	Viswanathan	
2002	Chathurangam	Mathew Varghese	
2003	Manassinakkare	Kuriakose	
2003	Ente Veedu Appuvinteyum	Dr. Krishnakumar	
2003	Mr Brahmachari	Ananthan Thampi's father	
2003	Thilakkam	Padmanabhan master	
2003	Balettan	Balachandran's Father	
2003	Arimpara	Krishnan Unni	
2003	Margam	Venukumara Menon	
2003	Maayaamohithachandran		Unreleased
2003	Zameendaar		
2003	Parinamam	Damodaran Nambeeshan	
2004	Vismayathumbathu	Dr. Sunny Joseph	
2004	Mampazhakkalam	Raghavan Mash	
2004	Nizhalkuthu	Jailer	
2004	Yanam	Fr. Thomas	
2004	Nerku Ner		
2004	Vettam	Retd D.I.G Tom Uncle	
2004	Jalolsavam	Aalakkal Govindanashan	
2004	Amrutham	Jayaram's father	
2004	Ee Snehatheerathu	Sashtri	
2005	Mayookham	Unni's Father	
2005	Ponmudipuzhayorathu	Muthappan	
2005	Finger Print	Rama Varma Thampuran	
2005	Anandabhadram	Padmanabhan Nair	
2005	Thanmathra	Ramesan's father	
2005	December		
2005	Cholliyattam		Unreleased
2006	Parayam	Kannan Perumadiyoor	
2006	Rashtram	Chief Minister Janardhanan Kurup	
2006	Prajapathi	Kunjambu Nair	
2006	Saira	Ustad Ali Hussain	
2006	Pothan Vava	Meppattor Vishnu Narayanan Nampoothiri	
2006	Palunku	Teacher	
2006	Kaiyoppu	CP Vasudevan	
2006	Nottam	Vaasudevan Chakyar	
2007	Changathipoocha	Sreedharan Nair	
2007	Vinodayathra	John Matthew	
2007	Arabikkatha	"Society" Gopalan	
2007	Nivedyam	Ramappan Namboothiri	
2007	Thaniye		
2007	Indrajith	Madhavan	
2007	Ayur Rekha	Captain Nair	
2007	Khaki	Padathuveettil Balakrishnan Nair	
2007	Black Cat	Pathrose Mooppan	
2008	Novel		
2008	Mizhikal Sakshi	Lebba Sahib	
2008	De Ingottu Nokkiye		
2008	Anthiponvettam		
2008	Chandranilekkoru Vazhi		
2008	Thavalam	Panicker	
2008	Oru Pennum Randaanum	Police Constable	
2008	College Kumaran	Manager Shivaraman Nair	
2008	Twenty:20	Video Archive	
2009	Banaras	M.K. Nair	
2009	Love in Singapore	Pereira	
2009	Sagar Alias Jacky Reloaded	Chief Minister of Kerala	
2009	Bhagyadevatha	Sadanadan Pillai	
2009	Passenger	Driver Nair	
2009	Ivar Vivahitharayal	Freddy Uncle	
2009	Puthiya Mukham	Kichan's father	
2009	Keralotsavam 2009	Padmanabhan Embranthiri	
2009	Swantham Lekhakan	Palazhi Sivasankarappilla	
2009	Gulumaal - The Escape	Prabhakara Varma	
2009	Boomi Malayalam		
2009	Mithram		

=== 2010s ===
List of 2010s Malayalam film credits
Year	Title	Role	Notes
2010	Pathinonnil Vyazham	Kizhakkedan	
2010	Kadaksham		
2010	Punyam Aham	Kaarackal Easwaran Namboodiri	
2010	Pokkiri Raja	Madhavan Nair	
2010	Oru Naal Varum	Havildar Vasudevan	
2010	Alexander the Great	Dr. Korah	
2010	Malarvaadi Arts Club	Kumaran	
2010	Penpattanam	Unnithan Muthalali	
2010	Sakudumbam Shyamala	Shekaran IAS	
2010	Raama Raavanan	Annadurai	
2010	Elsamma Enna Aankutty	Kunnel Pappan	
2010	Best Actor	Denver Aashan	
2010	Living Together	Vasudevan Kartha	
2010	In Ghost House Inn	Father Dominic	
2011	Arjunan Saakshi	P. K. Namboothiri	
2011	Mohabbath		
2011	August 15	VG Sadasivan	
2011	Manikyakkallu	Headmaster	
2011	Violin	Doctor	
2011	Orma Mathram		
2011	Teja Bhai & Family		
2011	Adaminte Makan Abu	Govindan Master	
2011	Oru Marubhoomikkadha	Thomas Varghese	
2011	Kanakompathu	Thomas Varghese	
2012	Vaadhyar		
2012	Collector	Mahendra Varma	
2012	Unnam	Murugan	
2012	Friday	Purushothaman	
2012	Njanum Ente Familiyum		
2012	Akasathinte Niram	The Old Man	
2012	Thiruvambadi Thamban	Kunjoonju	
2012	Achante Aanmakkal	Madhava Menon	
2012	Hero	Thankachan	
2012	Mayamohini	Sankaran Potti	
2012	Mr Marumakan	Rajagopalan Thampy	
2012	Bhoopadathil Illatha Oridam	Panchayat President(Ezhuthachan)	
2012	Ithramathram	Gowdar	
2012	Gramam	Govindankutty Maashu	
2012	Puthiya Theerangal	Advocate Immanuel	
2012	The King & the Commissioner	Padmabhooshan Dr EK Sudharshan	
2013	Nadodimannan	Thiruvilancore Thirumanassu	
2013	White Paper		
2013	Blackberry		
2013	Aattakkatha		
2013	Isaac Newton S/O Philipose	Philipose	
2013	Celluloid	Subramaniam	
2013	Tourist Home		
2013	Sound Thoma	Manikunju	
2013	Money Back Policy	Onachan	
2013	Immanuel	Jabbarikka	
2013	Orissa	Immanuel	
2013	Memories	Father John	
2013	Kadal Kadannu Oru Maathukutty	Thomas	
2013	North 24 Kaatham	Gopalan	
2013	Sringaravelan	Radha's Grand father	
2014	Thamarassery to Thailand		Unreleased
2014	Urava		Unreleased
2014	Law Point	Ramakrishnan	
2014	Mosayile Kuthira Meenukal	Kuriachen	
2014	Gamer	Zacharia	
2014	To Noora with Love	Dr. Sajan Varghese	
2014	Munnariyippu	Superintendent Rama Moorthy	
2014	Ottamandaram	Teacher	
2014	Sapthamashree Thaskaraha	Nobelettan	
2014	Villali Veeran	Damodarji	
2014	Lal Bahadur Shastri	Bahadur	
2014	Homely Meals	Father	
2014	Aamayum Muyalum	Kashi	
2014	Buddhanum Chaplinum Chirikkunnu	Principal	
2014	Perariyathavar	Workshop Master	
2015	Rasam	Valliyottu Thirumeni	
2015	Saradhi		
2015	Alif	Kunhammu Saheb	
2015	Valiya Chirakulla Pakshikal	Chief Editor	
2015	Oru Second Class Yathra	Narayanan Mesthiri	
2015	Rudra Simhasanam	Shiva Thannu	
2015	Nirnayakam	Venu Kuttan	
2015	Lord Livingstone 7000 Kandi	C. K. A. K. Menon	
2015	Charlie	Kunjappan	
2015	Kanneerinu Madhuram		Unreleased
2016	Alathoorile Ithirivettam		Unreleased
2016	Town to Town		Unreleased
2016	Ente Classile Aa Penkutti		Unreleased
2016	Mallanum Mathevanum		Unreleased
2016	Prakasam Parathunna Penkutti		Unreleased
2016	Paavada	Pillai	
2016	James & Alice		
2016	Krishikkaaran	Pillai	Unreleased
2016	Kadhantharam		
2016	Ente Amma		Unreleased
2016	Olive Marangal Pookkumbol		Unreleased
2016	Hello Namasthe		
2016	Oppam	Justice Krishnamoorthy	
2016	Kochavva Paulo Ayyappa Coelho	Appooppan Thambi	
2016	Pinneyum	Pappu Pilla	
2016	Mayamalika		
2017	Avarude Raavukal	Scobo Jones	
2017	Oru Visheshapetta Biriyani Kissa	Krishnan Nair	
2017	Pokkiri Simon	Prof. Seetha Raman	
2017	Udaharanam Sujatha	George Paul	
2018	Diwanjimoola Grand Prix	Davisettan	
2018	Carbon	Basheer	
2018	Daivame Kaithozham K. Kumar Akanam	God	500th film
2018	Khaleefa		
2018	Kammara Sambhavam	Selvan Moopenu	
2018	Oru Kuprasidha Payyan	Adv. Santosh Narayanan	
2018	Thattumpurath Achuthan	Gangadharan	
2018	Joseph	Adv. Srinivasan	
2018	Oru Kuttanadan Blog	Nediyedath Hari's father	
2019	Panthu		
2019	1948 Kaalam Paranjathu		
2019	Vaarikkuzhiyile Kolapathakam	Kurukkan Ponnappan	
2019	Madhura Raja	Madhavan Nair	
2019	Varthakal Ithu Vare		
2019	Subharathri	Majeed	
2019	A for Apple	Narayanan	
2019	Thakkol	Thomas IPS(retd), Thomachayan	
2019	Chila NewGen Nattuvisheshangal	Bhaskara Karanavar	
2019	Thelivu		

=== 2020s ===
List of 2020s Malayalam film credits
Year	Title	Role	Notes
2020	Orange Marangalude Veedu	Samuel	
2021	Yuvam	Judge	
2021	Aanum Pennum		Final film role Segment: Rani
2021	Marakkar: Lion of the Arabian Sea	Zamorin	Posthumous release
2022	Aarattu	Sreedharan Master	Posthumous release
2022	Bheeshma Parvam	Iravipillai	Posthumous release
2022	Ente Mazha		Posthumous release
2022	Puzhu	Mohanan	Posthumous release
2022	Jack N' Jill	Colonel Ramachandran Nair	Posthumous release
2023	Kopam	Sadhu Ganapathy Iyer	Posthumous release
2024	Manorathangal	Madhavan Mash	Posthumous release Segment: Kazhcha

== Films in other languages ==
=== Tamil ===
List of Tamil film credits
Year	Title	Role	Notes
1995	Mogamul	Ranganna	Tamil debut
1996	Indian	SP Krishnaswamy	
2005	Anniyan	Parthasarathy	
2008	Poi Solla Porom	K. R. Sathyanathan	
2008	Silambattam	Vichu's grandfather	
2019	Sarvam Thaala Mayam	Vembhu Iyer	
2021	Navarasa	School principal	Web series; Segment: Summer of '92
2024	Indian 2	Krishnaswamy	Posthumous release

=== English ===
- 2007 Chaurahen

=== Sanskrit ===
- 2016 – Ishti
- 2021 – Taya

== Television ==
- Shakunam (Doordarshan)
- Kairali Vilasam Lodge (Doordarshan) (Direction, acting)
- Verukal (Doordarshan)
- Jwalayayi (Doordarshan)
- Manasariyum Yanthram (Doordarshan)
- Poovanpazham (Telefilm) (Doordarshan)
- Gandharvayamam (Asianet)
- Swapnam (Asianet)
- Sparsham (Asianet)
- Avasthantarangal (Kairali TV)
- Oomakkuyil (Surya TV)
- Raagardram (Doordarshan)
- Sree Guruvayorappan (Surya TV)
- Prayanam (Surya TV)
- Peythozhiyathe (Surya TV)
- Kunjalimarakkar (Asianet)
- Sreekrishnan (Surya TV)

Sthree Parvam Navam (Amritha TV)
