= List of Indian composers =

List of Indian composers, arranged in alphabetical order:

== Film composers ==
A

- Aabha Hanjura
- Aadesh Shrivastava
- Abhay Sopori
- Abhimann Roy
- Abhijit Banerjee
- Abhijit Vaghani
- Abhijit Majumdar
- Abhishek Ray
- Aby Tom Cyriac
- Achint Thakkar
- Aditi Ramesh
- Adnan Sami
- Ajay–Atul
- Akassh
- Akhil Sachdeva
- Alex Paul
- Alokananda Dasgupta
- Alphons Joseph
- Alleppey Ranganath
- Amaal Mallik
- Amar Haldipur
- Amar Mohile
- Amartya Bobo Rahut
- Amit Trivedi
- Amrutha Suresh
- Anand Raaj Anand
- Anand–Milind
- Anjjan Bhattacharya
- Anil Biswas
- Anitha Shaiq
- Anirudh Ravichander
- Ankit Tiwari
- Ananda Shankar
- Anu Malik
- Anushka Manchanda
- Anupam Dutta
- Anup Rubens
- Anurag Saikia
- Anupam Roy
- Anweshaa
- Arijit Singh
- Arko Pravo Mukherjee
- A. R. Rahman
- Arjun Janya

B

- B. Ajaneesh Loknath
- B Praak
- Badshah
- Bahadur Khan
- Bappi Lahiri
- Bennet Veetraag
- Berny Ignatius
- Basil C J
- Bharath B. J.
- Pandit Bhajan Sopori
- Bhavatharini
- Bheems Ceciroleo
- Bhupen Hazarika
- Bijibal
- Bombay Ravi

C

- Chaitan Bharadwaj
- Chakri
- Chandan Shetty
- Chandran Veyattummal
- Chitragupta Shrivastava
- Chirrantan Bhatt
- C. Ramchandra
- Clinton Cerejo

D

- D. Imman
- Daboo Malik
- Damodar Raao
- Datta Naik
- Debojyoti Mishra
- Deva
- Devi Sri Prasad
- Dhibu Ninan Thomas
- Dhruv Ghanekar
- Dhruv Visvanath

F

- Falguni Pathak

G

- Gaurav Chatterji
- G. Devarajan
- G. V. Prakash Kumar
- Gangai Amaran
- Ghulam Mohammed
- Gifton Elias
- Gopi Sunder
- Govind Vasantha
- Gowry Lekshmi
- Gurukiran
- Guru Randhawa
- Gulzar

H

- Hamsalekha
- Harris Jayaraj
- Hari & Sukhmani
- Harshit Saxena
- Harshavardhan Rameshwar
- Hemant Kumar
- Hesham Abdul Wahab
- Himesh Reshammiya
- Hitesh Modak
- Hridaynath Mangeshkar

I

- Ifthi
- Ilaiyaraaja
- Indraadip Dasgupta
- Ismail Darbar

J

- Jaani
- Jaan Nissar Lone
- Jackie Vanjari
- Jaddanbai
- Jaidev
- Jaidev Kumar
- Jakes Bejoy
- Jasbir Jassi
- Jasleen Royal
- Jatin–Lalit
- Javed–Mohsin
- Jerry Amaldev
- Jeet Ganguly
- Jim Ankan Deka
- Joi Barua
- Johnson
- Julius Packiam
- Justin Prabhakaran
- Justin Varghese
- Jyotsna Srikanth

K

- K. M. Radha Krishnan
- K
- Kailash Kher
- Kaithapram Damodaran Namboothiri
- Kalyanji-Anandji
- Kanishk Seth
- Karthik
- Karthik Raja
- Karthikeya Murthy
- Kamal Heer
- Kartik Seshadri
- K. Raghavan
- Krsna Solo
- Koti

L

- Laxmikant–Pyarelal
- L. Subramaniam
- Lily Chakraborty
- Louis Banks
- Luke Kenny

M

- Madan Mohan
- Mahati Swara Sagar
- Manoj George
- Manan Bhardwaj
- Mannan Shaah
- Mani Sharma
- Manikanth Kadri
- Meet Bros
- Meet Jain
- Mickey J Meyer
- Mithoon
- Mitraz
- M. G. Radhakrishnan
- M. Jayachandran
- M. M. Keeravani
- M. M. Srilekha
- M. S. Viswanathan
- M.S Baburaj
- Mohan Sithara
- Monty Sharma
- Mohammed Zahur Khayyam
- Mujeeb Majeed
- Munna Kasi

N

- N. Ravikiran
- Naushad Ali
- Nadeem-Shravan
- Neel Dutt
- Nevel Gracias
- Nikhil–Vinay
- Nitin Dubey
- Nitz 'N' Sony
- Nityanand Haldipur
- Nucleya

O

- Oni-Adil
- O. P. Nayyar
- Ouseppachan

P

- P.V.R. Raja
- P V N S Rohit
- Palash Muchhal
- Pankaj Kumar Mullick
- Parichay (singer)
- Papon
- Pawandeep Rajan
- Payal Dev
- Prakash Alex
- Prashant Pillai
- Prashanth R Vihari
- Prateek Kuhad
- Pravesh Mallick
- Pritam Chakraborty
- Priya R. Pai
- Poornachandra Tejaswi

R

- Raam Laxman
- Rachita Arora
- Ram Sampath
- Ram Miriyala
- Raghav Sachar
- Raghu Dixit
- Raghu Kumar
- Rahul Dev Burman
- Rahul Jain
- Rajat Dholakia
- Rajesh Roshan
- Raju Singh
- Rajan Somasundaram
- Rahul Raj
- Raichand Boral
- Ranjit Barot
- Ranajoy Bhattacharjee
- Rasbihari Desai
- Ratheesh Vega
- Ravi
- Ravi Basrur
- Pandit Ravi Shankar
- Ravindra Jain
- Raveendran
- Remo Fernandes
- Reghu Kumar
- Rimi Basu Sinha
- Rishi Rich
- Rochak Kohli
- Rohit Sharma
- Rohan-Rohan
- Roshan
- Roop Kumar Rathod
- Runki Goswami

S

- Saahil Prem
- S. J. Jananiy
- S. P. Balasubrahmanyam
- Sachin Dev Burman
- Sachet–Parampara
- Sajid-Wajid
- Sachin–Jigar
- Sagar Bhatia
- Sai Abhyankkar
- Sai Karthik
- Salil Chowdhury
- Salim–Sulaiman
- Samira Koppikar
- Sam C. S.
- Sanjeev–Darshan
- Sanjoy Chowdhury
- Sanju Rathod
- Sanchit Balhara and Ankit Balhara
- Sandeep Chowta
- Sandeep Shirodkar
- Sandesh Shandilya
- Sangeet-Siddharth
- Santhosh Narayanan
- Samidh Mukerjee
- Sardar Malik
- Sargam Jassu
- Saraswati Vidyardhi
- Saurabh-Vaibhav
- Sean Roldan
- Shaan Rahman
- Shaarib Sabri
- Shabbir Ahmed
- Shamir Tandon
- Shankar–Ehsaan–Loy
- Shantanu Moitra
- Sharreth
- Shashwat Sachdev
- Shankar–Jaikishan
- Shekar Chandra
- Shiv–Hari
- Shreyas Puranik
- Siddharth Mahadevan
- Sricharan Pakala
- Srinivas Khale
- Shubha Mudgal
- Sneha Khanwalkar
- Sohail Sen
- Soumik Sen
- S. N. Tripathi
- S. P. Balasubrahmanyam
- S.P.Venkatesh
- Suchitra Mitra
- Sutej Singh
- Sudha Ragunathan
- Sudhir Phadke
- Sunil Kashyap
- Sunny M.R.
- Sunny and Inder Bawra
- Surinder Sodhi
- Sushin Shyam
- Suparna Kanti Ghosh

T

- Tanishk Bagchi
- Tarsame Singh Saini
- Tapas Relia
- Thaman S
- Toshi Sabri
- Tony Kakkar
- Tushar Lall

U

- Usha Khanna
- Uttam Singh

V

- Vaishali Samant
- Vanraj Bhatia
- Vani Harikrishna
- Vasant Desai
- Vayu Shrivastav
- Veturi
- Vidyasagar
- Vidyadharan
- Vijai Bulganin
- Vijay Antony
- Viju Shah
- Vikram Montrose
- Vikram Singh
- Vipin Patwa
- Vishal Bhardwaj
- Vishal–Shekhar
- Vishal Mishra
- Vishal Shelke
- Vishvesh Parmar
- Viswanathan–Ramamoorthy
- Vivek Venugopal
- Vivek Sagar

Y

- Yashraj Mukhate
- Yash Narvekar
- Yo Yo Honey Singh
- Yuvan Shankar Raja

Z

- Zakir Hussain
- Zubeen Garg

== Carnatic composers ==
- Annamacharya
- Chembai Vaidyanatha Bhagavatar
- Ilayaraja
- Irayimman Thampi
- L. Subramaniam
- Lalgudi Jayaraman
- M Balamuralikrishna
- Muthuswami Dikshitar
- Purandara Dasa
- Papon
- Subbaraya Shastri
- Swathi Thirunal
- Syama Shastri
- Thyagaraja
- Periasamy Thooran
- Jayadeva
- VVS Murari

== Western Classical/Art music Composers (of Indian descent) ==
- Clarence Barlow
- Ilayaraja
- L. Subramaniam
- Sandeep Bhagwati
- Reena Esmail
- Vijay Iyer
- Shirish Korde
- Rudresh Mahanthappa
- Naresh Sohal
- Param Vir
