= Mama Bagunnava =

- Theatrical release poster
- Directed by: Kodi Ramakrishna
- Written by: Thotapalli Madhu (dialogues)
- Screenplay by: Kodi Ramakrishna
- Story by: Panju Arunachalam
- Based on: Vanaja Girija (1994)
- Produced by: Jayakrishna
- Starring: Rajendra Prasad; Naresh; Rambha; Mohini; Bhanupriya
- Cinematography: B. N. Rao
- Edited by: Suresh Tata
- Music by: Vidyasagar
- Production company: Jayakrishna Movies
- Release date: 15 April 1997
- Running time: 135 mins
- Country: India
- Language: Telugu

Mama Bagunnava (transl. Father-in-law, Are You Fine) is a 1997 Telugu-language comedy film directed by Kodi Ramakrishna. It stars Rajendra Prasad, Naresh, Rambha, Mohini, Bhanupriya and music composed by Vidyasagar. The film is remake of the 1994 Tamil movie Vanaja Girija which itself was a remake of 1974 Tamil movie Engamma Sapatham which had already been remade earlier in Telugu in 1975 as Ammayila Sapatham. The film was recorded as a flop at the box office.

== Cast ==
- Rajendra Prasad as Gopala Krishna
- Naresh as Janaki Ram
- Rambha as Jaya
- Mohini as Vijaya
- Kota Srinivasa Rao as Dhanumjayam
- Brahmanandam as Compounder
- Costume Krishna as Thokku
- Tanikella Bharani as Priest
- Rallapalli as Police Inspector
- Suthi Velu as Talupulu
- Eeswar Rao as Prakash Rao
- Bhanupriya as Gowri
- Kovai Sarala as Sundarambal Iyer
- Subha as Parvathamma
- Kullamani as Patient

== Soundtrack ==
Mama Bagunnava

Film score by Vidyasagar
- Released: 1997
- Genre: Soundtrack
- Length: 22:13
- Label: Supreme Music
- Producer: Vidyasagar

Vidyasagar chronology
| Thaali (1997) | Mama Bagunnava (1997) | Aayanagaru (1998) |

Music composed by Vidyasagar. Music released on Supreme Music Company.

| No. | Title | Lyrics | Singer(s) | Length |
|---|---|---|---|---|
| 1. | "Ramudu Mechina Udatha" | Sirivennela Sitarama Sastry | S. Janaki | 4:16 |
| 2. | "Chinnari Chikatela" | Siva Ganesh | Mano, Chitra | 4:13 |
| 3. | "Udyagamistanu" | Sirivennela Sitarama Sastry | S. P. Balasubrahmanyam, Chitra | 4:17 |
| 4. | "Gaajula Chetiki Meesam" | Vadepalli Krishna | Chitra, Gayatri | 4:27 |
| 5. | "Iditirani Tiyani Daham" | Sirivennela Sitarama Sastry | S. P. Balasubrahmanyam, Gayatri | 5:00 |
| Total length: | | | | 22:13 |
