= Babu Thiruvalla =

Indian film producer, director and scriptwriter

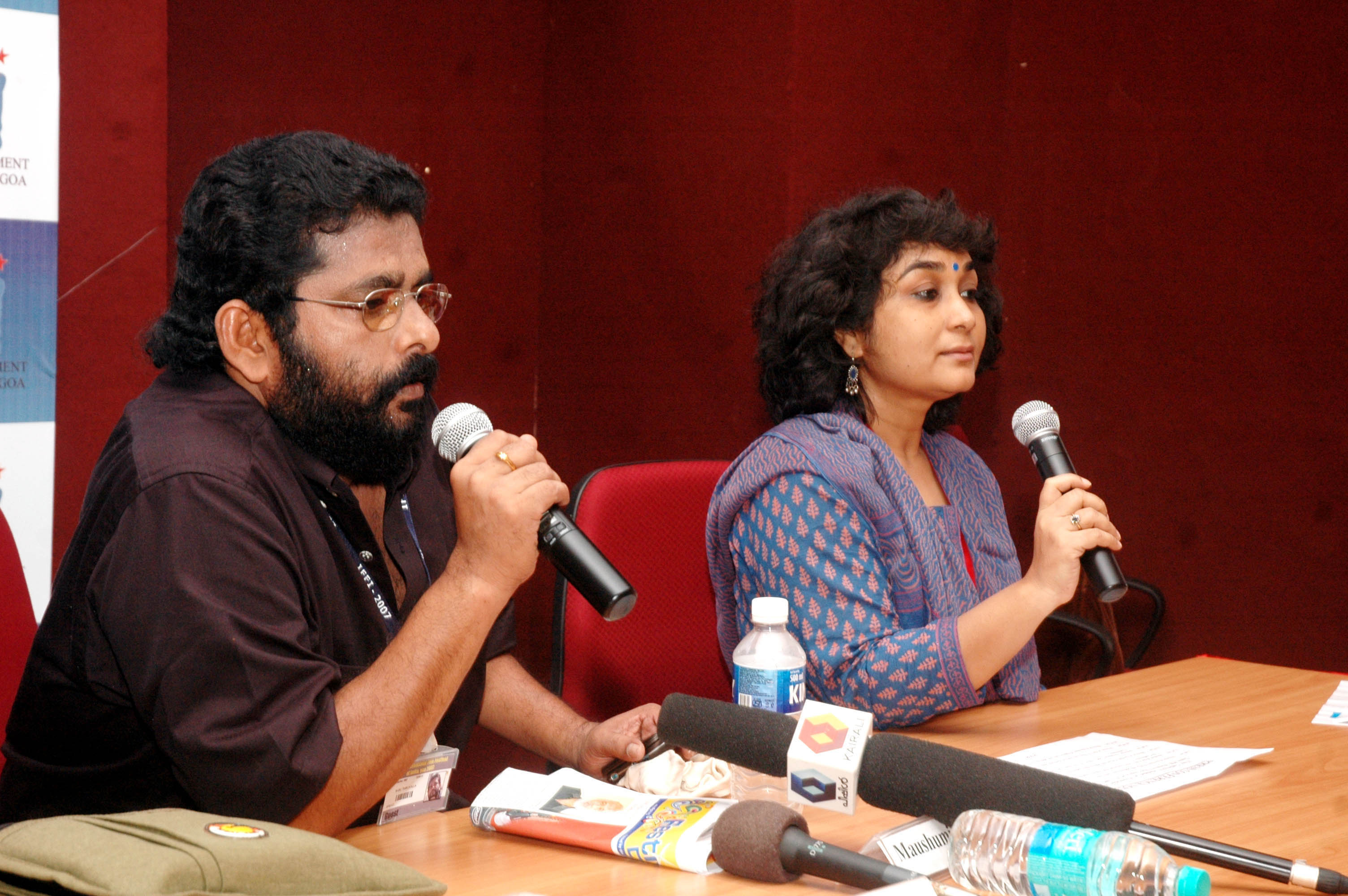
- Thiruvalla at IFFI 2007
- Born: Thiruvalla
- Citizenship: India
- Occupations: Film producer, director, scriptwriter
- Awards: See here

Babu Thiruvalla is an Indian film producer, director, and scriptwriter who works in Malayalam films. He produced films such as Oru Minnaminunginte Nurungu Vettam (1987) and Amaram (1991) under the banner Symphony Creations. Most of the films he produced got either State(Kerala) or National(India) award in some category. His first directorial venture 'Thaniyae' bagged more than 20 Awards including State Award and Indian Panorama.His directorial venture Thanichalla Njan (2012) won the National Film Award for Best Feature Film on National Integration. He was a Jury member for selecting Indian film for the Oscar award 2016. Latest venture in film field was with doing a segment for Crossroad (2017 film) in directorial role.jury member of IFFK 2019.

== As producer ==
- Oru Minnaminunginte Nurungu Vettam (1987)
- Amaram (1991)
- Savidham (1992)
- Samagamam (1993)
- Arabia (1995)
- Kannaki (2001)

== As director ==
- Thaniye (2007, also as writer)
- Thanichalla Njan (2012)
- Mounam
- Sound of Morality (Short Fiction)

== Awards ==
- Padmarajan Award for Best Film (2008, won - Thaniye)
- Best Film Award by the Atlas Film Critics Association (2008, won - Thaniye)
- ALA Award (2008, won - Thaniye)
- Kerala State Film Award for Best Début Director (2008, won - Thaniye)
- Ujala-Asianet Film Award for Best Script Writer (2008, won - Thaniye, shared with Nedumudi Venu)
- Nargis Dutt Award for Best Feature Film on National Integration (2013, won - Thanichchalla Njaan)
- Bharatan Puraskaram for Best Feature Film (2008, won - Thaniye)
- Jhon Abraham Puraskaram for Best Feature Film (2008, won - Thaniye)
- Filmfare Award for Best Director – Malayalam for Thaniye in 2008
