= Viswajith =

Indian composer, singer and musician

- Born: Viswajith C. T. Muhamma, Kerala, India
- Genres: Indian classical music; soft rock; world music
- Occupations: Composer; music producer; singer; music director; arranger; sequencer; writer
- Years active: 2005–present

Viswajith C. T. is an Indian composer, singer and musician who works in Malayalam, Marathi and Telugu films.

== Career ==
Viswajith C T started his career by singing tracks for famous music composers Ramesh Narayan, M. G. Radhakrishnan and Thankaraj. he composed music for several TV serials which include Pradakshinam, Nadakame Ulakam, Ammayodoppam, and Chanakyatantram. His debut as a film music composer was in the 2005 film Oraal in which he composed the song 'Eni Entethu Mathram'. He was asked to work for a Malayalam ghazal album featuring K. S. Chithra and Hariharan (Malhaar). Then he composed music for a film Veeralipattu starring Prithviraj Sukumaran

== Filmography ==
=== As music director (TV) ===
Sl.No	Serials	Notes	Channels
1	Amritavarsham	Director – Anil, Singers- Viswajith, Latha.D.S	Amrita TV
2	Ormayil	Director – R.Unnikrishnan, Voice- Viswajith, Latha D.S	Amrita TV
3	Pradikshnam	Director – Director – Manoj Manayil, Lyrics – Manoj Manayil, Singers – viswajith, Latha.D.S	Amrita TV
4	Nadakameyulakam - Satire	Director – V.T. Santhosh Kumar, Lyrics – Kiran Prabhakar, Singers – Sriram, Sherdin	Amrita TV
5	Best Actor - Reality show	Director -Director – Ramesh	Amrita TV
6	Udayamritham	Director – Reji Syne, Lyrics – Traditional, Producer – Increation, Singers – Kavalam sreekimar, Viswajith	Amrita TV
7	Sandhyadeepam	Director – Manoj Manayil, Lyrics – Manoj Manayil, Singer – Sreeidevi	Amrita TV
8	Poomukham	Director – Manoj Manayil, Lyrics – Manoj Manayil, Singer – Manjari	Amrita TV
9	Onam Titles (2007, 2008, 2009 & 2010)	Lyrics – Manoj Manayil, Singers – Kavalam Sreekumar, Srikumar, Anil Ram, Viswajith	Amrita TV
10	Anjali	Director – Sohanlal, Lyrics – Sohanlal, Singer – Viswajith	Amrita TV
11	Thirakkil Alppaneram	Director – Ananda Pathmanabhan	Amrita TV
12	Best Citizen Journalist 1st & 2nd - Reality show	Producer – Supa	Amrita TV
13	Sruthileyam - (Classical show)	Director – Ajith Namboothiri	Amrita TV
14	Ragaretnam Yuva	Director – Padmendraprasad	Amrita TV
15	Ragaretnam Junior - (Carnatic music Classical Reality show)	Director – Ajith namboothiri	Amrita TV
16	Ammayadoppam	Director – Manoj Manayil, Lyrics – Manoj Manayil, Singer – Viswajith	Amrita TV
17	Sakhi	Producer – Bindhu	Amrita TV
18	Amrithessi nee thane -	Lyrics – Kiran Prabhakar, Singer – Viswajith	Amrita TV
19	Arivamma - (Chindhamritham)	Director – Reji Syne, Lyrics – Mochitha, Singer – Viswajith, Producer – Increation	Amrita TV
20	[[Chirikidathom - (Comedy)]]	Director – Ramesh, Lyrics – Kiran Prabhakar, Singer – Nithin	Amrita TV
21	Samarppanam - (Amma's Programe)	Singer – Viswajith	Amrita TV
22	Cinema Karyam	Director – Ananda Padmanabhan, Singer – Viswajith	Amrita TV
23	Kadhayallithu Jeevitham	Director – Monoj Manayil, Lyrics – Monoj Manayil, Singer – Priya R Pai	Amrita TV
24	Helth Watch	Director – Madanan	Amrita TV
25	Murali chodhikkunnu	Director – Ananda Padmanabhan	Amrita TV
26	Cityzan Impact	Director – Supa	Amrita TV
27	Bhagavath Geetha	Director – Reji Syne, Production – Increation	Amrita TV
28	Vandanam	Director – Reji Syne, Producer – Increation	Amrita TV
29	Arabian Online	Director – Ananda Padmanabhan	Amrita TV
30	Sukumara Vilasam	Director – Satheesh	Amrita TV
31	Sabareesham	Director & Lyrics- Manoj Manayil, Singer – Nandhu Kartha	Amrita TV
32	Sannidanam	Director & Lyrics – Manoj manayil, Singers – Navaneeth Varma, Chandrasekaran	Amrita TV

=== As music director (Film) ===
Year	Title	Language	Notes
2005	Oraal	Malayalam	Debut film
2007	Veeralipattu	Malayalam	
2011	Race	Malayalam	
2015	Rudra Simhasanam	Malayalam	

== Recognition ==
- Kerala State Award for the Best Music Director 2009 (TV)
- Vayalar Award for the Best Music Director 2011 (TV)
- Kerala State Award for the Best Music Director 2014 and 2015 (TV)
