= Film Employees Federation of Kerala =

Indian film industry employees' association

- Formation: 25 April 1993; 33 years ago
- Headquarters: Kochi, Kerala
- Location: India
- Fields: Malayalam film industry
- President: Renji Panicker
- Vice president(s): Rafi; Vidhu Vincent
- General Secretary: G. S. Vijayan
- Treasurer: Shibu Gangadharan
- Website: FEFKA

The Film Employees Federation of Kerala (FEFKA), is an Indian organisation for directors, associates, and assistants in the Malayalam film industry in southern India.

== History ==
The Film Employees Federation of Kerala (FEFKA) was formed on 25 April 1993.

In February 2018 FEFKA established its a women's wing, chaired by Bhagyalakshmi. It is described as a platform where concerns of women technicians can be voiced, with the women's wing acting as arbitrators to sort them out.

== Description ==
FEFKA is located in Kochi.

== Leadership ==
Year	President	Vice President(s)	General Secretary	Joint Secretaries	Treasurer	Committee Members	Ref.
2025-26	Renji Panicker	Rafi, Vidhu Vincent	G. S. Vijayan	Ajai Vasudev, Baijuraj Chekavar	Shibu Gangadharan	Sophia Jose, Sohan Seenulal, Salam Bappu, Jude Anthany Joseph, Shibu Parameswaran, Manoj Aravindakshan, Anuraj Manohar, V. C. Abhilash, Girish Damodar, Joju Raphael, Vishnu Mohanan, Nithin M. S., Tom Emmatty, Vijeesh C. R.	
2019-21	Renji Panicker	Jeethu Joseph, O. S. Girish	G. S. Vijayan	Sohan Seenulal, Baijuraj Chekavar	Salam Bappu	Sibi Malayil, B. Unnikrishnan, Shafi, Mallu S. Lal, Ranjith Sankar, Siddhartha Shiva, G. Marthandon, Jayasurya Y. S., Arun Gopi, Leo Thaddeus, Mustafa M. A., P. K. Jayakumar, Shaji Aziz, Sreekumar Arukutty	
