= Kudamattam =

- Poster
- Directed by: Sundar Das
- Written by: Navaz Babu
- Screenplay by: Navaz Babu
- Produced by: Sundar Das
- Starring: Vijayaraghavan; Biju Menon
- Cinematography: Ramachandra Babu
- Edited by: G. Murali
- Music by: Johnson
- Production company: Aradhana Arts
- Distributed by: Aradhana Arts
- Release date: 9 May 1997
- Country: India
- Language: Malayalam

Kudamattam is a 1997 Indian Malayalam-language romance action drama film written by Navaz Babu and directed by Sundar Das who also produced the film under the banner of Aaradhana Arts. The film stars Vijayaraghavan and Biju Menon in lead roles. And Dileep, Manju Warrier, Mohini and Kalabhavan Mani in the supporting roles. The film has musical score by Johnson.

== Cast ==
- Vijayaraghavan as Sivan Kutti
- Biju Menon as Pankajakshan
- Dileep as Appukuttan
- Manju Warrier as Gauri
- Mohini as Yashodha
- Kalabhavan Mani as Balan
- Meghanathan as Muthu
- Nadirsha
- Baburaj as Murugan
- Aboobacker
- Abu Salim as Kanaran
- Jose Pellissery as Sukumara
- Kalabhavan Narayanankutty as Hariprasad
- Kozhikode Sharada
- Kuthiravattam Pappu as Nanu
- Mala Aravindan
- N. F. Varghese as Chandradas
- Oduvil Unnikrishnan as Aadikeshavan
- Biyon
- Niyas Backer

== Soundtrack ==
The music was composed by Johnson and the lyrics were written by Kaithapram.

| No. | Song | Singers | Lyrics | Length (m:ss) |
|---|---|---|---|---|
| 1 | "Anivairakkallumaala" | K. J. Yesudas, K. S. Chithra | Kaithapram | |
| 2 | "Neram Poy" (Niranazhi Poovum) [F] | K. S. Chithra | Kaithapram | |
| 3 | "Neram Poy" (Niranazhi Poovum) [M] | Unni Menon | Kaithapram | |
| 4 | "Thappum Kottaathappaani" | Krishnachandran | Kaithapram | |
| 5 | "Thiruvaathiraraavupolum" | K. S. Chithra | Kaithapram | |
| 6 | "Thiruvaathiraraavupolum" [M] | K. J. Yesudas | Kaithapram | |
| 7 | "Vellinilaavil Venchaamaram" | K. S. Chithra, M. G. Sreekumar, Chorus | Kaithapram | |

== Box office ==
The film was a commercial success.
