= Thanichalla Njan =

- Directed by: Babu Thiruvalla
- Produced by: Bobby Avagama
- Starring: K. P. A. C. Lalitha; Kalpana; Jagathy Sreekumar; Ashokan; Sivaji Guruvayoor
- Music by: Kaithapram Vishwanath
- Release date: 2012
- Country: India
- Language: Malayalam

Thanichalla Njan is a 2012 Malayalam language film that was directed by Babu Thiruvalla. It is based on the true story of Chellamma Antharjanam, a suicidal woman that was rescued by a Muslim social worker, Razia Beevi. The movie performed well at the 60th National Film Awards, where it won the award for Best Feature Film on National Integration. Actress Kalpana also received the National Film Award for Best Supporting Actress for her portrayal of Razia Beevi. Kalpana later remarked that she had not initially wanted to take on the role of Razia, as it was so different from what she had done up to that point in her career, and had urged Thiruvalla to hire Urvashi in her stead.

Filming for Thanichalla Njan took place in Kidangara and Thiruvalla during early 2012. That same year writer K. S. Noushad had filed a complaint against Thiruvalla, claiming that he had written the film's screenplay and that the director had refused to give him credit.

== Synopsis ==
Chellamma is a Brahmin woman who has decided to take her own life, as she believes that no one truly wants her in their life. With this in mind she goes to a railway station to commit suicide by jumping in front of a train, but at the last moment she is saved by Razia Beevi, a social worker and Muslim. Caring little about caste or religion that would prove to be a barrier for others, Razia takes Chellamma into her own home and cares for her.

== Cast ==
- K. P. A. C. Lalitha as Chellamma Antharjanam
- Kalpana as Razia Beevi
- Jagathy Sreekumar
- Ashokan
- Sivaji Guruvayoor
- Ponnamma Babu

== Awards ==
- Best Feature Film on National Integration (2012, won)
- National Film Award for Best Supporting Actress (2012, won - Kalpana)
