= Samagamam =

Samaagamam
- Directed by: George Kithu
- Written by: John Paul
- Screenplay by: John Paul
- Produced by: Babu Thiruvalla
- Starring: Jayaram; Rohini; Sukumari; Thilakan
- Cinematography: K. P. Nambiathiri
- Edited by: N. P. Satheesh
- Music by: Johnson
- Production company: Symphony Creations
- Distributed by: Symphony Creations
- Release date: 1993
- Country: India
- Language: Malayalam

Samaagamam is a 1993 Indian Malayalam film, directed by George Kithu and produced by Babu Thiruvalla. The film stars Jayaram, Rohini, Sukumari and Thilakan in the lead roles. The film has musical score by Johnson.

== Plot ==
Skaria is a plantation owner and has other businesses. Skaria and Annakutty have a daughter, Elsamma. She is a college student and her father has high hopes about her. A new sports coach, Johnson comes to the college and she falls in love with him. When Skaria learns about it he makes arrangements for his daughter's marriage to someone of his choice before things get worse. Meanwhile, a close friend of the family and a lecturer at the college, a priest, Fr. Puthentara betrays Skaria's friendship and helps Johnson and Elsamma to get married. Soon after that he leaves the place for higher studies. Both Johnson and Elsamma move to Chennai. Skaria becomes further depressed. Slowly Annakutty falls ill and is bedridden, and she wishes to see her daughter. Skaria is confident that he will be able to take care of her and that the medications will cure her, but when he finds that the medication is useless, he asks if she wants to meet Elsamma. However, the morning after he contacts his daughter Annakutty passes away in her sleep. Elsamma arrives with her son, Renji. Annakutty's funeral is done. Renji and Skaria quickly become friends. Before Elsamma and Renji leave for Chennai, Skaria tells Renji that Renji should bring his father, Johnson, too when they come the next time. Elsamma reveals that her husband died three years earlier and that she is employed in his office. Skaria is shocked and asks why she did not return home. She says it's because of a promise she made to her husband that since her father was not in favour of her marrying Johnson, Renji should not be brought up in her father's house. After his daughter leaves for the train station, he goes there and asks if he can live with her and his grandson so that she need not break the promise she made to her late husband before he died. Skaria leaves with his grandson and Elsamma to Chennai.

== Cast ==
- Jayaram as Johnson
- Rohini as Elsamma
- Sukumari as Raahel
- Thilakan as Pallivathukkal Skariyachan
- Kaviyoor Ponnamma as Annakutty
- Nedumudi Venu as Fr. Puthentara
- Jose Pellissery as Eenashu
- Kozhikode Narayanan Nair as Principal
- Idavela Babu as Babu
- Ashokan as Joy

== Soundtrack ==
The music was composed by Johnson.

| No. | Song | Singers | Lyrics | Length (m:ss) |
|---|---|---|---|---|
| 1 | "Manjum Nilaavum" | K. J. Yesudas, Chorus | O. N. V. Kurup | |
| 2 | "Paadippokaam" | S. Janaki, Johnson | O. N. V. Kurup | |
| 3 | "Vaazhthidunnithaa" | S. Janaki | O. N. V. Kurup | |
| 4 | "Vaazhthidunnithaa" (bit) | S. Janaki, C. O. Anto | O. N. V. Kurup | |
