= Nadodi Pattukkaran =

1992 film by N. K. Viswanathan

- Poster
- Directed by: N. K. Viswanathan
- Written by: Sangili Murugan; Jaya Rajendran (dialogues)
- Produced by: Sangili Murugan
- Starring: Karthik; Mohini
- Cinematography: N. K. Viswanathan
- Edited by: V. Rajagopal; B.K. Mohan
- Music by: Ilaiyaraaja
- Production company: Murugan Cine Arts
- Release date: 15 May 1992
- Running time: 130 minutes
- Country: India
- Language: Tamil

Nadodi Pattukkaran (transl. Nomad singer) is a 1992 Indian Tamil-language romantic drama film directed by N. K. Viswanathan. The film stars Karthik and Mohini. The film, scripted and produced by Sangili Murugan, was released on 15 May 1992.

== Plot ==
Sundaram, Thevar Ayya, Periya Madurai, Seedan, Vadivelu and Annamalai form a music group. Sundaram is a jobless graduate who prefers making his living by singing than being unemployed. The group travels from village to village leaving their families. One day, the group enters a village where robbers spread terror among the villagers. The group confronts them and the police arrests the robbers. The group becomes quickly popular. Geetha, the daughter of the village head Sivathaya, falls under the spell of Sundaram. Later, Geetha and Sundaram fall in love, on the other side Geetha's family objects their love. What transpires later forms the crux of the story.

== Cast ==
- Karthik as Sundaram
- Mohini as Geetha
- Jaishankar as Sivathaya
- M. N. Nambiar as Thevar Ayya
- S. S. Chandran as Sakkarai
- Rocky as Periya Pandi
- Senthil as Uyaram
- Vivek
- Charle as Seedan
- Chinni Jayanth as Vadivelu
- Thyagu as Periya Madurai
- Manangatti Subramaniam as Annamalai
- Senthamarai as DSP
- V. Gopalakrishnan
- Peeli Sivam
- O. A. K. Sundar as Chinna Pandi
- Karuppu Subbiah as Suna Pana
- Kullamani
- Master Kannan
- Master Arun
- Gandhimathi as Chella Thayi
- Y. Vijaya as Vadivu
- S. N. Parvathy
- Annapoorna as Sundaram's mother
- Vijaya Chandrika
- Thalapathy Dinesh

== Soundtrack ==
The music was composed by Ilaiyaraaja.

Song	Singer(s)	Lyrics	Duration
"Aagaya Thamarai"	Ilaiyaraaja, S. Janaki	Vaali	4:57
"Kadhalukku Kangalillai"	S. P. Balasubrahmanyam, Swarnalatha	Muthulingam	5:00
"Mannaiyam Ponnaiyum"	S. P. Balasubrahmanyam, S. Janaki	Vaali	5:48
"Vaanga Vaanga"	Malaysia Vasudevan, Mano, Ramani, T. S. Raghavendra	Piraisoodan	5:09
"Vanamellam Shenbagapoo" (solo)	S. P. Balasubrahmanyam	Gangai Amaran	5:11
"Vanamellam Shenbagapoo" (duet)	P. Susheela, S. P. Balasubrahmanyam	Gangai Amaran	4:21
"Thenpandi Cheemai"	Gangai Amaran	Parinaman	4:34
"Sithirathu There Vaa"	Mano, Swarnalatha	Na. Kamarasan	4:48

== Reception ==
N. Krishnaswamy of The Indian Express said "Ilayaraja has a few melodious numbers in this film, that sees Karthik emoting well. Directed and photographed by N. K. Viswanathan, the film is one that has possibilities that are wasted because of his preference for the pedestrian". C. R. K. of Kalki praised the performances of Karthik, Mohini and Nambiar, Ilayaraja's music but panned the comedy and concluded no matter what the film is, after a formula has been determined that all the incidents must be in this order, there is no need for a single story writer to give them a context.
