= Ghazal (1993 film) =

1993 film directed by Kamal

- Directed by: Kamal
- Written by: T. A. Razzaq
- Produced by: Arjun Creations
- Starring: Vineeth; Thilakan; Mohini; Nassar; Sreenivasan
- Cinematography: Ramachandra Babu
- Edited by: K. Rajagopal
- Music by: Bombay Ravi
- Release date: 1993
- Country: India
- Language: Malayalam

Ghazal (ഗസൽ) is a 1993 Malayalam film directed by Kamal. Vineeth and Mohini play the lead roles in the film and Thilakan appears in a supporting role. Director Kamal considers the film close to his heart, a film that took him to childhood memories.

== Cast ==
- Vineeth as Muneer
- Mohini as Sereena
- Nassar as Valiyamaliyekkal Syed Burhanudeen Thangal
- Thilakan as Thangal Uppappa
- Srividya as wife of Burhanudeen Thangal
- Nedumudi Venu as Alikkutty
- Manoj K. Jayan as Khadar
- Sreenivasan as Beeran
- Santha Devi as Kondotty Ammayi
- Sonia
- Zeenath as Amina, mother of Khadar
- Mamukkoya as Mollakka
- Kuthiravattam Pappu as Ossan
- Jose Pellissery as Muzeebath/ Valiyamaliyekkal Syed Sarafudheen Thangal
- Kunjandi as Ravunninair
- Idavela Babu as Nambeesan kutti
- Ragini

== Soundtrack ==
Gazal

Soundtrack album by Bombay Ravi
- Released: 1993
- Genre: Ghazal

Bombay Ravi chronology
Sukrutham (1992)	Gazal (1993)	Padheyam (1993)

Professional ratings
Review scores
Source	Rating
Dishanth.com	9.5/10 stars

The music of the film proved successful, but the critical responses were mixed. The music was done by Bombay Ravi, while the lyrics were penned by Yusuf Ali Kechery. K. J. Yesudas, K. S. Chithra and Minmini are the vocalists. "Isal Thenkanam" and "Sangeethame Ninte" were the most popular songs from the album.

=== Track listing ===
Title	Singer(s)	Duration
"Athirukalariyatha Pakshi"	K. J. Yesudas	4:54
"Ezham Baharinte Akkare"	K. J. Yesudas, Minmini	4:07
"Iniyumundoru Janmam"	K. J. Yesudas, K. S. Chithra	4:24
"Innente Kalbile"	K. J. Yesudas	4:48
"Isal thenkanam"	K. J. Yesudas, K. S. Chithra	5:00
"Sangeethame Ninte"	K. S. Chithra	4:43
"Vadakku Ninnu Padivanna"	K. J. Yesudas, K. S. Chithra	4:36
