= Veeralipattu =

Veeraalipattu
- Directed by: Kukku Surendran
- Screenplay by: Ashok Sasi
- Story by: Neeraj Menon
- Produced by: Sunil Surendran
- Starring: Prithviraj Sukumaran; Murali; Padmapriya; Jagathy Sreekumar
- Cinematography: Manoj Pillai
- Edited by: Hariharaputhran
- Music by: Songs: Viswajith; Background Score: Mohan Sithara
- Distributed by: Maruthi Film Factory
- Release date: 20 July 2007
- Country: India
- Language: Malayalam

Veeralipattu is a 2007 Indian Malayalam-language film directed by Kukku Surendran, starring Prithviraj Sukumaran, Murali and Padmapriya.

The film was produced by Sunil Surendran for Open Channel, and was distributed by Maruthi Film Factory. The film was dubbed in Tamil and released as Nagercoil.

== Plot ==
Hari is depicted as an IT company employee who works in Chennai and is originally from a village in Kerala. His family members include his father, mother, grandfather and sister. Per family custom, his grandfather is a Velichappadu. Hari is in love with Pooja, who is of a royal family. In spite of her parents desire for her to marry a wealthy man from the United States, Pooja falls in love with Hari.

Two years before Hari had moved to Chennai, his grandfather had died and the role of Velichappadu transferred to Hari's father. This change in status led to turmoil in Hari's relationship with his father. Hari's father initially disliked Pooja, but came around. One day, while in the act of Velichappadu at the temple, Hari's father dies due to a brain tumor. In a dream, Hari fears that he might become the family's next Velichappadu. He finally accepts his fate and goes to temple dressed as a Velichappadu, but is relieved to see another man filling that role.

== Cast ==
- Prithviraj Sukumaran as Harinarayanan
- Murali as Madhavan Nair
- Padmapriya as Pooja
- Jagathy Sreekumar as Narayanan Nair
- Suraj Venjaramoodu as Pavithran
- Madampu Kunjukuttan as Patteri
- Geetha Salam as Mammadikka
- Sreejith Ravi as Chandu
- Indrans as Ramu
- Jaffar Idukki as Barber Sundaran
- Anoop Chandran as Ajayan, Auto driver
- Krishnan
- Lakshmi
- Rekha as Gayathri, Hari's mother
- Ansi John

== Soundtrack ==
The songs for the film were composed by Viswajith and Rajeev O. N. V.; the lyrics were written by O. N. V. Kurup, Vayalar Sarath Chandra Varma, Sohan Lal and Prasad Pisharody. The background music was scored by Mohan Sithara.

The soundtrack was distributed by Manorama Music. Songs:

1. "Alilayum": Vineeth Sreenivasan, Manjari Babu
2. "Alilayum": Manjari Babu
3. "Ilaneerin": Anvar Sadath, K. S. Chithra
4. "Parayoo NInakkenne (Manorama Bonus Track)": Vidhu Prathap
5. "Shankhanaadam (Filler from Aparichitha)": Anwar Sadath, Saraswathy Shankar, Viswajith
6. "Sharadinduvaay Vanna [Manorama Bonus Track]": G. Venugopal
7. "Shararaanthalinnu Raavil": Sreenivas

== Awards ==
- 2007 Kerala State Film Award for Second Best Actor - Murali
- 2007 Kerala State Film Award – Special Mention - Jagathy Sreekumar
