= Pranaya Nilavu =

Pranayanilaavu
- VCD cover
- Directed by: Vinayan
- Written by: V. C. Ashok
- Produced by: J. P. Jayaraj
- Starring: Dileep; Mohini; Kalabhavan Mani; Jagathy Sreekumar
- Cinematography: Utpal V. Nayanar
- Edited by: G. Murali
- Music by: Berny-Ignatius
- Production company: Lakshmi Devi Combines
- Distributed by: Lakshmi Devi Combines
- Release date: 24 September 1999
- Country: India
- Language: Malayalam

Pranayanilaavu is a 1999 Indian Malayalam-language film directed by Vinayan. The film stars Dileep, Mohini, Kalabhavan Mani and Jagathy Sreekumar. The film's score was composed by Berny-Ignatius.

== Cast ==
- Dileep as Kannan
- Mohini as Nabeesu
- Nedumudi Venu as Madhavan Nair
- K. R. Vijaya as Lakshmi
- Captain Raju as Hajiyar
- Jagathy Sreekumar as Kunjahammad
- Kalabhavan Mani as Moosootty
- Meghanathan as Jamal
- Harishree Ashokan as Mathai
- Madhu as Thangal
- Neeraja Rajsankar Baiju as Kunjipathu
- Manka Mahesh
- Subair as Salim
- Idavela Babu as Azeez
- Indulekha
- Mahima

== Soundtrack ==
The music was composed by Berny Ignatious with lyrics by S. Ramesan Nair.

No.	Song	Singers	Lyrics	Length (m:ss)
1	"Kadu Parikkum"	Baby Hima	S. Ramesan Nair	04:02
2	"Kunkuma Sandhya Than"	Vishwanath	S. Ramesan Nair	04:48
3	"Maanathoru"	K. S. Chithra	S. Ramesan Nair	04:23
4	"Nettiyil Annu Njan"	Biju Narayanan	S. Ramesan Nair	04:25
5	"Palkkudangal"	K. J. Yesudas, Radhika Thilak	S. Ramesan Nair	04:13
6	"Ponnitta Pettakam" (F)	A. R. Rahna	S. Ramesan Nair	04:04
7	"Ponnitta Pettakam" (M)	K. J. Yesudas	S. Ramesan Nair	04:06
8	"Thinkalazhcha Nombukal Nottu"	Biju Narayanan, Maya Menon	S. Ramesan Nair	04:04
