= Asthram (1983 film) =

- Directed by: P. N. Menon
- Written by: P. N. Menon; John Paul (dialogues)
- Screenplay by: John Paul
- Starring: Bharath Gopi; Mammootty; Mohanlal; Nedumudi Venu; Jyothi
- Cinematography: Devi Prasad
- Edited by: T. Sasikumar
- Music by: Shyam
- Production company: Menon Films
- Distributed by: Menon Films
- Release date: 9 November 1983
- Running time: 125 minutes
- Country: India
- Language: Malayalam

Asthram (transl. Arrow) is a 1983 Indian Malayalam-language film directed by P. N. Menon. The film stars Bharath Gopi, Mammootty, Mohanlal, Nedumudi Venu and Jyothi in the lead roles. The film has musical score by Shyam. This movie is loosely based on the Nanavati murder case. Author Bibekanada Ray described the film as one of Menon's films "dealing with various contemporary political and social concerns" in her book about India's offbeat cinema.

== Plot ==
Capt. C. S. Nair, a Naval officer, and Rekha is a happily married couple. Inspector Stephen and the captain are good friends. When the captain leaves for his work assignment, Rekha has to spend a lonely life in their big mansion. She occasionally takes a drive and spends time with Stephen's daughter Lilly. The Captain's elder sister Sharada, who was staying separate from her husband, had a kid Biju. Sharada had died of a tumor and since then Rekha was taking care of Biju like her own son.

During the next occasion of leave, when captain is informed that Sharada is no more, he suggests to admit Biju in a boarding school, so that he gets the best schooling possible. The Captain meets Balu, a photographer, accidentally, he likes him very much and treats him as his own brother. They spend time together along with Balu's friends in outings and other leisure events.

Soon Rekha and Balu start an affair. Balu later feels guilt and runs away from her. Rekha has a difficult time recovering from the end of this relationship. When the Captain is home, she discloses about the affair. Though she doesn't reveal the man, the Captain deduces that it is Balu, owing to the indifference in Balu's recent behaviour towards him.

The Captain insists that Balu marry Rekha, which Balu declines, leading to what is in his mind, forming the climax.

== Cast ==
- Bharath Gopi as Captain C. S. Nair
- Mammootty as Balu
- Mohanlal as Das
- Nedumudi Venu as Krishnanunni
- Jyothi as Rekha
- Sukumari as Sharada Chechi
- Jagathy Sreekumar as Philip
- Sankaradi as Nanu Maashu
- Isaac Thomas as Dr. Thomas
- Jesey as Rev. Father
- Lissy as Lilly
- Vijayan
- Balan K. Nair as Stephen
- Bhagyalakshmi
- Chamundeswary
- Master Twinku as Biju
- Meghanathan as Johny
- Punnapra Appachan
- Chamundeswari

== Soundtrack ==
The music was composed by Shyam and the lyrics were written by Poovachal Khader and Sathyan Anthikkad.

No.	Song	Singers	Lyrics	Length (m:ss)
1	"Chinchillam Chiri Thooki"	K. J. Yesudas	Poovachal Khader	
2	"Kingini Ponmani Manjeeram"	S. Janaki	Poovachal Khader	
3	"Kunjikkurumbu"	Sujatha Mohan, Kausalya	Sathyan Anthikkad	
