= Varam (film) =

- Directed by: Haridas
- Written by: Sasidharan Arattuvazhy
- Screenplay by: Sasidharan Arattuvazhy
- Produced by: Hamsa Muhammed
- Starring: Mukesh; Mohini; Sukumari; Thilakan
- Cinematography: Anandakkuttan
- Edited by: K. Sankunni
- Music by: Ouseppachan
- Production company: We-Two Cine Communications
- Distributed by: We-Two Cine Communications
- Release date: 1993
- Country: India
- Language: Malayalam

Varam is a 1993 Indian Malayalam film, directed by Haridas and produced by Hamsa Muhammed. The film stars Mukesh, Mohini, Sukumari and Thilakan in the lead roles. The film has musical score by Ouseppachan.

== Cast ==
- Mukesh as Eby Perera
- Mohini as Neelima
- Sukumari as Neelima's Aunt
- Thilakan as Dr. Uncle
- A. C. Zainuddin as Peter Fernadez
- Ganesh Kumar as Daniel Dizuza
- Janardanan as Gangadhara Menon (Neelima's Father)
- Mamukkoya as patient
- Beena Antony as Leena (Neelima's Friend)

== Soundtrack ==
The music was composed by Ouseppachan and the lyrics were written by Gireesh Puthenchery.

No.	Song	Singers	Lyrics	Length (m:ss)
1	"Hey Sarike"	K. S. Chithra	Gireesh Puthenchery	
2	"Kunkumavum"	M. G. Sreekumar, Sujatha Mohan	Gireesh Puthenchery	
3	"Vennilaavinte Varna"	K. J. Yesudas, Sujatha Mohan	Gireesh Puthenchery	
