= Mohini (Tamil actress) =

Indian actress

- Born: Mahalakshmi Sreenivasan; 1976 (age 49–50); Thanjavur, Tamil Nadu, India
- Occupations: Actress; evangelist
- Years active: 1991–1999; 2004–2011; 2026
- Spouse: Bharath
- Children: 2

Mahalakshmi Sreenivasan, OP, better known by her stage name Mohini, is an Indian actress who has acted in Tamil, Telugu, Malayalam, Kannada and Hindi films. She is a member of the Lay Dominicans. She made her comeback to cinema after a 15 year hiatus in Prithviraj Sukumaran starrer Khalifa: The Ruler (2026).

== Personal life ==
Mohini converted to Catholicism in 2006.

== Career ==
She worked in a huge number of superhit films like Aditya 369 (1991), Nadodi Pattukkaran (1992), Naan Pesa Ninaipathellam (1993), Pattukottai Periyappa (1994), Ee Puzhayum Kadannu (1996) and Mama Bagunnava (1997) to name a few.

Her debut Malayalam movie was Naadody (1992) along with Mohanlal. Her performance in Ghazal (1993) and Parinayam (1994) was critically well acclaimed.

Mohini has acted in over 100 movies in all South Indian languages and worked with renowned directors like Hariharan, Kamal and Singeetam Srinivasa Rao. She has also appeared in TV shows such as Kadhal Pagadai, Chinna Chinna Aasai - (Butterflies) and Kathanar Kadamattathu Kathanar.

Following her conversion to Catholicism, Mohini began serving as an evangelist.

== Partial filmography ==
Year	Title	Role	Language	Notes
1987	Koottu Puzhukkal	Surya's sister	Tamil	
1991	Eeramana Rojave	Shanthi	Tamil	
1991	Aditya 369	Hema	Telugu	
1991	Dancer	Priya Sharma	Hindi	
1992	Nadodi Pattukkaran	Geetha	Tamil	
1992	Kalyana Mantapa	Sudha	Kannada	
1992	Unakkaga Piranthen	Malini	Tamil	
1992	Unnai Vaazhthi Paadugiren	Asha	Tamil	
1992	Chinna Marumagal	Geetha	Tamil	
1992	Thai Mozhi	Mary	Tamil	
1992	Naadody	Sophy	Malayalam	
1992	Sriramachandra	Seetha	Kannada	
1993	Varam	Nileena	Malayalam	
1993	Jwala	Jyothi	Kannada	
1993	Detective Narada	Sharada	Telugu	
1993	Udan Pirappu		Tamil	Guest appearance
1993	Ghazal	Jinnu	Malayalam	
1993	Naan Pesa Ninaipathellam	Sandhya	Tamil	
1994	Kanmani	Kanmani	Tamil	
1994	Pudhiya Mannargal	Vidhya	Tamil	
1994	Vanaja Girija	Girija	Tamil	
1994	Pattukottai Periyappa	Uma	Tamil	
1994	Sididedda Pandavaru	Mohini	Kannada	
1994	Parinayam	Unnimaya	Malayalam	
1994	Sainyam	Lakshmi	Malayalam	
1995	Chantha	Merlin Joseph	Malayalam	
1995	Jameen Kottai	Nandini Devi / Mohini	Tamil	
1995	Gadibidi Aliya	Mohini	Kannada	
1995	Rowdy	Poornima	Kannada	
1996	Thayagam	Abirami	Tamil	
1996	Ee Puzhayum Kadannu	Ashwathy	Malayalam	
1996	Mayooranritham	Ragini Balachandran (Rakhi)	Malayalam	
1996	Kaanaakkinaavu	Laila	Malayalam	
1996	Manthrika Kuthira	Sonia Cherian	Malayalam	
1996	Kudumbakodathi	Panchami	Malayalam	
1996	Vishwanath	Jenifer	Tamil	
1996	Andha Naal	Mary	Tamil	
1997	Ullasapoongattu	Maya	Malayalam	
1997	Laali	Anju	Kannada	
1997	Mayaponman	Nandini	Malayalam	
1997	Mama Bagunnava	Vijaya	Telugu	
1997	Ikkareyanente Manasam	Sumathi	Malayalam	
1997	Hitler	Ammu/Annapurna	Telugu	
1997	Kudamattam	Yashodha	Malayalam	
1998	Punjabi House	Pooja	Malayalam	
1998	Nishyabda	Varsha	Kannada	
1998	Oru Maravathoor Kanavu	Mary	Malayalam	
1998	Meenakshi Kalyanam	Meenakshi	Malayalam	
1998	Cheran Chozhan Pandian	Gayathri	Tamil	
1998	Ayushman Bhava	Priya	Malayalam	
1999	Pranaya Nilavu	Nabeesu	Malayalam	
1999	Pattabhishekam	Kalyani	Malayalam	
2004	Vesham	Aswathy	Malayalam	
2006	Chacko Randaaman	Sainaba	Malayalam	
2006	Ammathottil	Dr. Shalini	Malayalam	
2007	Kuttrapathirikai	Rekha	Tamil	Delayed release
2008	Innathe Chintha Vishayam	Premila	Malayalam	
2011	Collector	Sethulakshmi (Mayor of Kochi)	Malayalam	
2026	Khalifa: The Ruler	Noorjahan	Malayalam	

=== Television ===
- Kadhal Pagadai (Sun TV) as Sithara
- Oru Pennin Kathai (Pothigai TV)
- Sherlock Mami (DD podhigai) as Janani
- Comedy Utsavam
- Chinna Chinna Aasai - Butterflies (also director)
- Raja Rajeshwari (Sun TV)
- Kathanar Kadamattathu Kathanar (Jaihind TV)
- Krishna
- Neelakkurinji Veendum Pookkunnu
