= Oru Second Class Yathra =

- Theatrical release poster
- Directed by: Jexson Antony; Rejis Antony
- Written by: Jexson Antony; Rejis Antony
- Produced by: Bijoy Chandran; Arun Ghosh; Alwin Antony
- Starring: Vineeth Sreenivasan; Chemban Vinod Jose; Joju George; Sreejith Ravi
- Narrated by: Prithviraj Sukumaran
- Cinematography: Vinod Illampally
- Edited by: Lijo Paul
- Music by: Gopi Sundar
- Production companies: Ananya Films; Tricolor Entertainment
- Distributed by: Chand V Creations & Tricolor Entertainment
- Release date: 8 May 2015 (India)
- Running time: 100 minutes
- Country: India
- Language: Malayalam

Oru Second Class Yathra (transl. A Second Class Journey) is a 2015 Indian Malayalam-language comedy thriller drama film written and directed by Jexson Antony and Rejis Antony (in their directorial debut). Starring Vineeth Sreenivasan, Chemban Vinod Jose, Joju George and Sreejith Ravi in lead roles

== Plot ==
Police constables Balagopal and Jolly Kurien have been at odds for years but are under orders to transfer two prisoners Nandu and Maaran from Kannur to Trivandrum. They board the Parasuram express with the handcuffed inmates. While at the Kayamkulam station, Nandu escapes. The two officers get off the train at the next stop with Maaran and frantically searches for Nandu. The three unlikely musketeers finds the back-story of Nandu.

Nandu's father, Narayanan always have a wrongful intention to Nandu's sister, Lakshmi. Lakshmi is the daughter of Nandu's mother and her former husband, thus making her a half-sister. Lakshmi is not the daughter of Narayanan. Nandu, one day determines to kill his father for the same, but the trap he set accidentally killed his mother. He gets arrested for his mother's murder. One day Narayanan comes to visit him at jail and reveals that he staged a drama of being a reformed man in front of Lakshmi. Nandu determines to escape at any possible opportunities. The three musketeers finds Nandu while roughing with Narayanan, both with the intention to kill. Narayanan tries to kill Nandu bu strangling him with his handcuff but Jolly saves Nandu but he accidentally kills Narayanan. Balagopal tries to report Jolly's crime to the police but Nandu decides to take the blame for Jolly, as he completed Nandu's mission. Knowing Narayanan's story, Maaran devises a plan to not let the issue known to others, to which everyone agrees. Narayanan's corpse is buried in a nearby church cemetery at that night itself. In the end of the day everyone is shown as happy in their karmic lives.

== Cast ==
- Vineeth Sreenivasan as Nandu
- Chemban Vinod Jose as Maaran
- Joju George as Jolly Kurian
- Sreejith Ravi as Balagopal
- Nikki Galrani as Lakshmi
- Nedumudi Venu as Narayanan Mesthiri
- Indrans as Govindan
- Sunil Sukhada as Jail superintendent Balan Nambiar
- Maniyanpilla Raju as ASI Johnson
- Mammukkoya as Alikkoya
- Pradeep Kottayam as Joppan
- Aparna Balamurali as Amritha Unnikrishnan
- Vanitha Krishnachandran as Indira, Lakshmi's and Nandu's mother
- Balu Varghese as Kumar
- Dr. Shaju as man in the train
- Sasi Kalinga as Koshi
- Thomas Unniyadan as D.I.G
- Chali Pala as Isaac
- Rajasekharan as Police Trainee
- Nelson Sooranad as Cleaner at Lorry
- Koottickal Jayachandran as James
- Saju Navodaya as Pindam Biju
- Hareesh Perumanna as Auto Driver
- Pavithran
- Arun Ghosh as Ernakulam Police Commissioner Anil Jacob IPS
- Bilal Ibn Jamal
- Sarath Chandran as Groom
- Paravai Muniyamma as Maran's step-mother
- Veena Nair as Vanajakumari
- Arya Rohit as young lady in the train
- Vijayakumari as old lady in the train
- Prithviraj Sukumaran as Narrator (Voice Only)

== Reception ==
=== Critical response ===
The film met expectations. The Times of India wrote that the film "has a promising premise, but ends up being just half of what it aspires to be."

Now Running said that the film was neither damaging or offensive. Most of the film's scenes were shot inside a train and they gave it a road movie feel. The story starts when the train is in northern Kerala and ends in southern Kerala. The passengers on the train are shown as they affect the story.

International Business Times wrote that the film "fails to come out as a comedy suspense thriller as it was supposed to be". The directors, Jexon Antony and Rejis Antony, adopted a flash-back narrative, but "unfortunately the suspense elements went amiss, especially in the second half." The first portion of the film offered promises which failed during its second half.

Indiaglitz noted that the slow story failed to meet the expectations of a thriller film. The first half of the film was alright, but the narrative flagging in the second half. It was felt that directors Jexson and Rejis Anthony did "okay on their first outing and a more polished movie is expected from them in future." The project's cinematography by Vinod Illampally was praised. Since thrillers require a greater punching up during post-production, "the editing seems a bit lax." The background score was fine, but in considering Gopi Sunder's body of work, it could have been better. They summarized, writing the film

has a novel theme, yet the execution could have been better. A bit more taut and crisp, with its first half- like narration in the second half too could have taken the movie far ahead. It is not a bad attempt and is very much a family movie and the subject of rape of a different nature is very relevant. Watch it without much expectation and you might be pleasantly surprised"

The Hindu felt writer/directors Jexson Antony and Rejis Antony tried to strike a proper balance between drama and comedy—juggling between the two modes would not wear down the audience. The Hindu felt this became evident in the film's second half, "where a scene of high tension and tragedy in the flashback cuts abruptly to a light-hearted one happening in the present." It was however, concluded that "Barring a few humorous scenes, Oru Second Class Yathra does not make for a pleasant trip to the cinema."

== Soundtrack ==
Music by: Gopi Sundar, Lyrics by: Hari Narayanan

- Ambazham Thanalitta - Vineeth Sreenivasan, Mridula Warrier

== Accolades ==
Asianet Film Awards

- Performer of the Year - Vineeth Sreenivasan (for Various films)
- Best Villain - Nedumudi Venu (also for Rudra Simhasanam)

Kerala State Film Awards

- Kerala State Film Award – Special Mention for Joju George

Vanitha Film Awards

- Best Villain - Nedumudi Venu (also for Rudra Simhasanam)
