= Shibu Gangadharan =

Indian film director (born 1972)

- Born: 30 April 1972 (age 54); Thiruvananthapuram, India
- Occupation: Film director
- Years active: 1999 – present
- Spouse: S. Komala Kumary
- Children: S.K Sankar S.K Sneha

Shibu Gangadharan (born 30 April 1972) is an Indian film director.

== Early life ==
Gangadharan was born in Thiruvananthapuram, Kerala; his father was S. Gangadharan Nair and his mother was S. Chandramathi Amma. He was educated at the Karumom UPS, SMV High School, Thiruvananthapuram, Mahatma Gandhi College and University College Thiruvananthapuram.

== Career ==
He entered the film field as an assistant director after gaining experience from the amateur drama movement. He started his film career with the National Award-winning film maker Rajeevnath on his film Janani in 1998, and worked with other directors in the industry including Shyamaprasad, K. Madhu, Rajiv Anchal, V.M. Vinu and Sanal Vasudev. He also worked as an assistant/associate director in TV serials, tele-films and documentaries.

== Filmography ==
As assistant / associate director

- Janani (1999)
- Priyam (2000)
- Sharjah to Sharjah (2001)
- Theerthadanam (2001)
- Kanmashi (2002)
- Moksham (2005)
- Iruvattam Manavatti (2005)
- Malabar Wedding (2008)
- Pakal Nakshatrangal (2008)
- Rahasya Police (2009)
- T. D. Dasan Std. VI B (2010)
- Pattinte Palazhi (2010)
- David and Goliath (2013)

As director

- Praise The Lord (2014)
- Rudra Simhasanam (2015)
