= Sutej Singh =

Indian guitarist and composer

- Origin: Solan, Himachal Pradesh, India
- Genres: Progressive rock
- Occupations: Musician; composer
- Instrument: Guitar
- Website: sutejsingh.com

Sutej Singh is an Indian guitarist and composer from Solan, Himachal Pradesh, who primarily plays progressive rock.

== Career ==
Sutej Singh's debut studio album, The Emerging, was released on 18 May 2018 and reached the No. 1 spot on the Apple Music India rock charts.

In 2023, Singh issued the single "Land of Gold". The track was featured as "Editor's Pick" by Rolling Stone India and highlighted by Homegrown's #HGMUSIC series.

In 2024, Singh performed at three major music festivals in India. He was a featured artist at the Ziro Festival of Music as well as playing at Bandland in Bengaluru and Mahindra Independence Rock in Mumbai.

In 2025, Singh released his second studio album, Restless | Relentless. He was awarded the TuneCore Grant, selected from over 360 independent artists across India. Following the album's release, Singh embarked on the Restless | Relentless India Tour 2025, performing across multiple Indian cities.

== Discography ==
Studio albums

- The Emerging (2018)
- Restless Relentless (2025)

Singles

- "Oceans Apart" (2018)
- "Walk My Path" (2018)
- "Land of Gold" (2023)
- "Kaadambari" (2025)
- "Flight in the Dark" (2025)
