= Vanaja Girija =

- Theatrical release poster
- Directed by: Keyaar
- Screenplay by: Panchu Arunachalam
- Story by: R. Selvaraj
- Produced by: Meena Panju Arunachalam
- Starring: Ramki; Napoleon; Khushbu; Mohini
- Cinematography: A. Karthik Raja
- Edited by: B. Lenin; V. T. Vijayan
- Music by: Ilaiyaraaja
- Production company: P. A. Art Productions
- Release date: 16 December 1994
- Running time: 150 minutes
- Country: India
- Language: Tamil

Vanaja Girija is a 1994 Indian Tamil-language comedy film directed by Keyaar. The film stars Ramki, Napoleon, Khushbu, and Mohini. It was released on 16 December 1994. The film is a remake of another Tamil film Engamma Sapatham (1974).

== Plot ==
The veterinarian Anand and the doctor Raja are brothers. Their father Ramanathan is a rich retired businessman. Vanaja and Girija live with their mother Lakshmi. Their father Shankar left them when they were young because of Ramanathan. Vanaja and Girija decide to take revenge on Ramanathan by charming his sons.

== Cast ==
- Ramki as Raja
- Napoleon as Anand
- Khushbu as Vanaja
- Mohini as Girija
- Visu as Ramanathan
- Urvashi as Chellamma
- Vivek as Appu
- Senthil as Kuppuswamy
- Nizhalgal Ravi as Shankar
- Kavitha as Lakshmi
- Vadivukkarasi as Vadivu
- Thyagu as Thyagu
- Mahanadi Shankar as Selvam
- K. S. Jayalakshmi as Mary
- Kumarimuthu

== Soundtrack ==
The music was composed by Ilaiyaraaja (in his 700th film composition).

Song	Singer(s)	Lyrics	Duration
"Munnam Seydha"	S. Janaki, S. P. Balasubrahmanyam	Vaali	6:37
"Othaiyila"	K. S. Chithra	Vaali	4:20
"Siragadikkuthu"	Swarnalatha, K. S. Chithra	Panchu Arunachalam	5:03
"Thirumagal Unn"	Arunmozhi	Panchu Arunachalam	1:35
"Unnai Edhirpaarthen"	S. P. Balasubrahmanyam, Swarnalatha	Vaali	5:38

== Reception ==
K. Vijiyan of New Straits Times gave a positive review that the film reminded him of Magalir Mattum and that the director "has managed to exploit most of the scenes in the movie for maximum comic relief". R. P. R. of Kalki praised the humour and acting of actors but found music to be disappointing and praised Keyaar for making a comedy film and succeeding in making viewers laugh.
