= Meghanathan =

Indian actor (1964–2024)

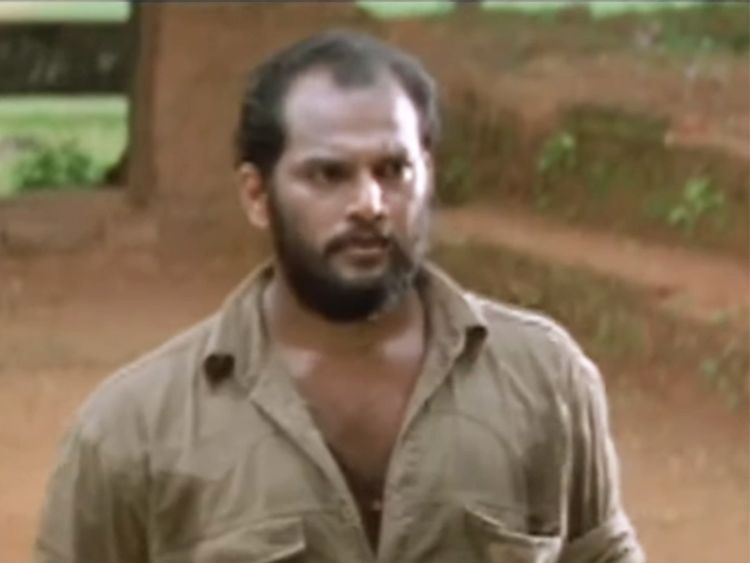
- Born: November 1964
- Died: 21 November 2024 (aged 60); Kozhikode, Kerala, India
- Occupation: Actor
- Years active: 1983–2024
- Spouse: Susmitha Meghanath
- Children: 1
- Parent(s): Balan K. Nair, Sarada Nair

Meghanathan (November 1964 – 21 November 2024) was an Indian actor who appeared in Malayalam and Tamil films. The son of actor Balan K. Nair, he debuted in 1983 in the Malayalam film Asthram. He acted in more than 75 Malayalam films.

== Biography ==
Meghanathan was born as the third child of Malayalam actor Balan K. Nair and Sarada Nair in Thiruvananthapuram, Kerala, India. He had two brothers (Anil and Ajayakumar) and two sisters (Latha and Sujatha). He had his primary education from Asan Memorial Association, Chennai, and completed Diploma in Automobile engineering from Coimbatore. He made his debut through the Malayalam film Ashthram in 1983.

Meghanathan was married to Susmitha. The couple had a daughter, Parvathi. They settled in Shoranur, Palakkad. Meghanathan died from respiratory failure at a private hospital in Kozhikode, on 21 November 2024, at the age of 60. He was cremated at his residence in the town of Shoranur.

== Filmography ==
Year	Title	Role	Notes
1983	Asthram	Johny	
1986	Panchagni	Ravi	
1993	Chenkol	Keerikkadan Sunny	
1993	Bhoomi Geetham	Parameshwaran	
1993	Chamayam		
1994	Malappuram Haji Mahanaya Joji	Veeran	
1994	Rajadhani	Muthu	
1995	Prayikkara Paapan	Gunda	
1996	Ee Puzhayum Kadannu	Raghu	
1996	Kaanaakkinaavu		
1996	Udyanapalakan	Shivankutty	
1997	Ullasapoongattu	Kaliyappan	
1997	Niyogam		
1997	Guru Sishyan		
1997	Kudamattam	Muthu	
1997	Newspaper Boy	Viswanathan	
1997	Mannadiar Penninu Chenkotta Checkan	Natesan	
1998	British Market		
1998	Oru Maravathoor Kanavu	Driver Thankappan	
1998	Chenapparambile Aanakkariyam	Muthu	
1999	Thachiledathu Chundan	Uthaman	
1999	Chandranudikkunna Dikkil	Thimmaiah	
1999	Pranaya Nilavu	Jamal	
1999	The Godman	Prabhu	
1999	Crime File	Stephen	
1999	Vasanthiyum Lakshmiyum Pinne Njaanum	Chandru	
2000	Kaathara		
2000	Cover Story	SI John Varghese	
2000	Ente Priyappetta Muthuvinu		
2001	Uthaman	Pulimuttathu Alexi Thomas	
2001	Chethaaram		
2003	Vellithira		
2003	Chakram	Gopalan	
2004	Pravasam		
2004	Paanchajanyam		
2004	Cholliyattam		
2005	Nerariyan CBI	Padmanabhan Achary	
2006	Yes Your Honour	Lakshmanan	
2006	Pathaaka	City Police Commissioner Yousuf Ali IPS	
2006	Vaasthavam	Sasidharan Pillai	
2008	Kanichukulangarayil CBI	Suresh	
2008	Gulmohar		
2008	Twenty 20	Video Archieve	
2008	Dalamarmarangal	Indusekharan	
2010	Thanthonni	Sub Inspector R. Ganeshan	
2010	Canvas		
2010	Thaskara Lahala	Madhavji	
2011	Aazhakkadal	Kuttapayi	
2012	Mizhi		
2013	Lisammayude Veedu		
2013	Kerala Today		
2015	Picket 43	Subedar Major Thampi	
2015	Kohinoor		
2015	Chaamante Kabani		
2015	Poyi Maranju Parayathe		
2016	Maanam Thelinju		
2016	Action Hero Biju	Rajendran	
2016	Appooppan Thaadi		
2016	Thoppil Joppan	Lazer	
2017	1971: Beyond Borders	Sulaiman	
2017	Munthirivallikal Thalirkkumbol	Prabhakaran	
2017	Sunday Holiday	S.I. Shafeeque K.V.	
2017	Sadrishavaakyam 24:29		
2017	Kaaliyan		
2017	Thrissivaperoor Kliptham	Ambi	
2017	Munthirivallikal Thalirkkumbol	Prabhakaran	
2018	Aadhi	Mani Annan	
2018	Johny Johny Yes Appa	Constable Chandrappan	
2018	Oru Online Pranayam		
2018	Uncle	Jeevananthan P.P	
2019	Mr. & Ms. Rowdy	Poornima's father	
2019	Under World	Shahul Hameed	
2019	Vikruthi	Hassan	
2019	Maamaankam	Chandroth Poduval	
2021	One	Excise Minister K.Ramachandran	
2022	Kochaal		
2022	Kooman	S.I. Sukumaran	
2023	Asthra		
2024	Samadhana Pusthakam	Poduval Mash	
2026	Juniors Journey		

== Awards ==
- Flowers TV awards 2016 -Best Character Actor (Serial: Sthreetvam -Surya TV)

== Television serials ==
- Sthreetvam (Surya TV)
- Meghasandesham (Kairali TV)
- Kathayariyathe (Surya TV)
- Snehanjali (Asianet)
- Chitta (Surya TV)
- Dhanumasappennu
- Chandrettanum Shobeduthiyum (DD Malayalam)
- Parayan Baaki Vechathu (Surya TV) - Telefilm
