= Rimi Basu Sinha =

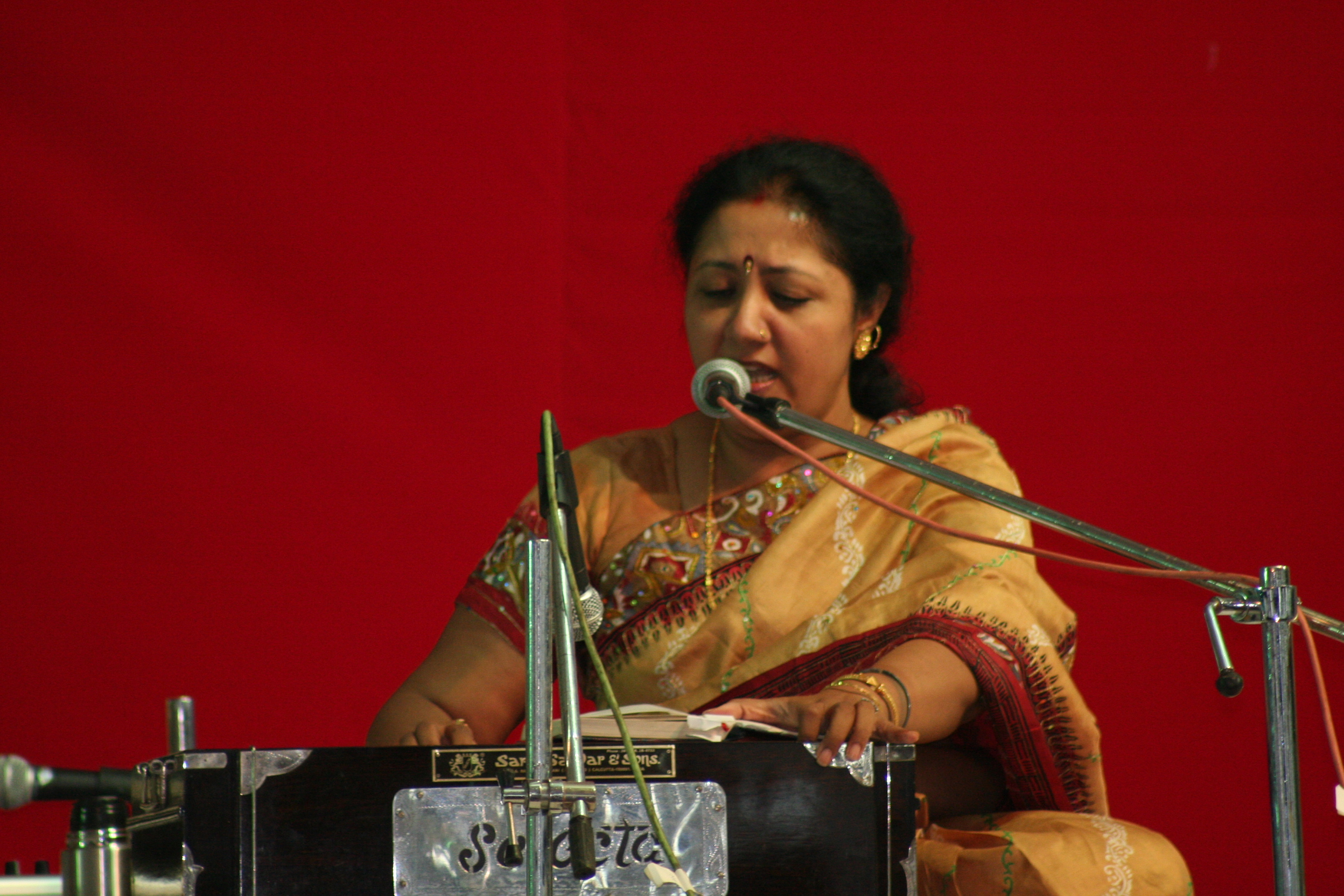

Background information
- Born: Allahabad, Uttar Pradesh, India
- Genres: Sufi, Bollywood, Folk, Indian Classical, Indie Pop, Fusion, Semi Classical
- Occupation: Singer/Composer
- Years active: 1986 – present
- Website: https://www.rimibasusinha.in/

Rimi Basu Sinha (born in Allahabad, Uttar Pradesh, India) is one of the very few female music composers in India. She is a trained musician and started training at the age of six. She has done her masters in Hindustani Classical from Allahabad University and then went on to pursue Sangeet Prabhakar and Senior Diploma in Light Music from Prayag Sangeet Samiti, Allahabad.

== Personal life ==
Born and brought up in a very well known Bengali family of Allahabad, Rimi grew up in an environment of music and theatre. She started learning music at an early age of six years and subsequently started taking part in many cultural programmes. At the age of fifteen she became AIR artiste and took part in several concerts. Presently she is a top graded artiste of All India Radio and Doordarshan. When she was six years old she started learning Hindustani music along with many other genres, with the late Shri B. N. Biswas Jee. Seeing her talent for music and singing, her parents encouraged her to pursue Hindustani Music as a subject in school and at college level. Subsequently, she went on to do her master's degree in Hindustani music at Allahabad University under the supervision of Pt. Ramashrya Jha jee and Smt. Kamla Bose. She also completed a Sangeet Prabhakar and Senior Diploma in light music from Prayag Sangeet Samiti of Allahabad. She was fully encouraged and supported by her family, especially her husband Shri Ramkrishna Sinha, to pursue her career in music.

== Career ==
One of the handful female music composers of India, Rimi is a top-graded artiste of AIR and Doordarshan. She has done numerous musical performances in India and abroad. In Kenya she performed at a function in United Nations Office, Nairobi organised by Indian High Commission and she has released 4 concept albums, the first of which, Maiyya Ka Darbaar, was produced by Times Music a company of The Times Group, India.

She has worked with well-known artists, including Kavita Krishnamoorthy, Sunidhi Chauhan, Shreya Ghoshal, Usha Mangeshkar, Kumar Sanu, Mahalakshmi Iyer, K. S. Chithra, Richa Sharma for her albums and other musical assignments and projects.

She is currently working on a variety of music projects/albums based on strong concepts/ themes. She is also associated with well known music academies in Mumbai like Indian Television Academy, SaReGaMa Academy as Voice Culturist /Mentor.

== Albums ==
=== Krishna Krishna (2019) ===
The album Krishna Krishna is a collection of spiritual and devotional songs for Lord Krishna. The album is dedicated to the fond memory of legal luminary and her father Justice Palok Basu. This has been released by Times Music.

=== Mann Bawra (2016) ===
Mann Bawra is a Hindi album released on Oct 2015. Mann Bawra Album has 4 songs sung by Rimi Basu Sinha. The album blends Indian classical sounds with western instrumentation [guitar, keyboards, and drums] that results in world music.

=== Sakhi – Celebrating Womanhood (2010) ===
Sakhi – Celebrating Womanhood is an all- women endeavour. Sakhi – Celebrating Womanhood, is written and composed by Rimi Basu Sinha and sung by four generation celebrated female artistes – Sunidhi Chauhan, K S Chithra, Kavita Krishnamurthy, Richa Sharma, Usha Mangeshkar, Mahalakshmi Aiyer, Aishwarya Majumdar and Rimi Basu Sinha. Two songs in the album are written by lyricist Pratibha Sharma.

=== Maiya Ka Darbaar (2008) ===
Maiya Ka Darbaar was released in October 2008. The album is composed by Rimi Basu Sinha. The album has 6 songs sung by Kumar Sanu and Rimi Basu Sinha.

| 2008 | Maiya Ka Darbaar | Times Music |
| 2010 | Sakhi – Celebrating Womanhood | Times Music |
| 2011 | Krishna | |
| 2016 | Mann Bawra | Artist Aloud |
| 2019 | Krishna Krishna | Times Music |

== Discography ==
- Maiya Ka Darbaar (2008)
- Sakhi – Celebrating Womanhood (2010)
- Krishna Krishna (2011)
- Mann Bawra (2016)
- Krishna Krishna (2019)
