= Vivek Venugopal =

Indian composer, guitarist, and producer

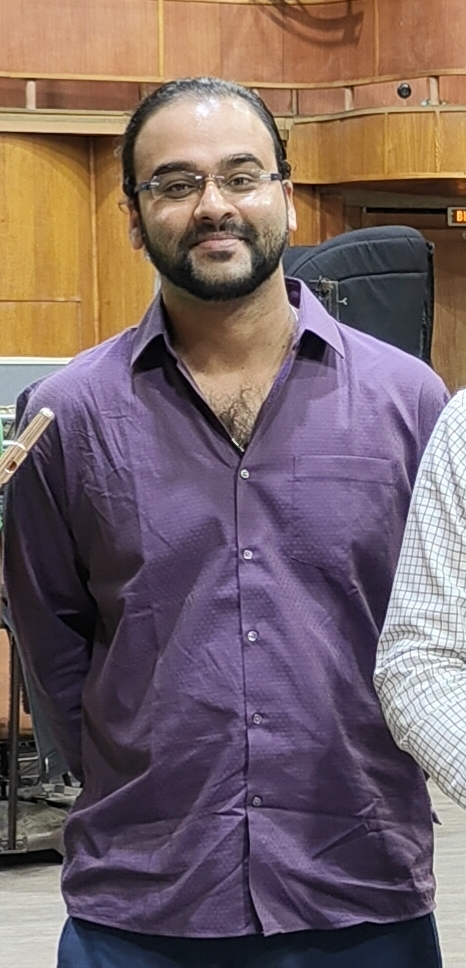

Background information
- Also known as: Visita
- Born: Vivek Venugopal
- Origin: Hyderabad, Telangana, India
- Genres: Classical, Jazz, World music
- Occupations: Composer, Guitarist, Producer
- Instrument: Guitar
- Years active: 2014–present
- Label: Visita Music
- Website: visitamusic.com

Vivek Venugopal, better known as Visita, is an Indian composer, guitarist, and producer. He primarily works with classical music.

== Career ==
Venugopal began his music career in 2014 as a self-taught guitarist under the project named Visita. Later, he became interested in Jazz and international ethnic music.

In 2015, Venugopal released his debut album Musings, which consisted of solo acoustic‑guitar compositions that he performed himself. He then followed this up with Syncretism, Vol. 1 in 2016, inspired by West African, Celtic, and Hindustani music.

In 2018, Venugopal presented his second solo guitar album, The Ascent of Mt. Purpose. Following that, he transitioned to composition, and in 2019, he worked with pianists Mitali Saraf and Shantanu Patel on a set of solo piano pieces, titled Chronicles: Consolation.

In January 2020, Venugopal released the second installment of the concept‑album series, titled Chronicles: Resolution, featuring duduk artist Arsen Petrosyan, cellist Magdalena Sas, and trumpeter Johnny Woodham. Later that year, he published An Ode to the Morphing Muse, Op. 6, a piece for two voices, cello, and piano, featuring singer‑conductor Salome and cellist Tatiana Kritskaya.

In March 2021, Venugopal released Reveries, Op. 7, featuring music for piano, violin, and cello, was released.

In 2022, Venugopal presented Moods for Violin & Piano, Op. 15, featuring pianist Nadine Jo Crasto and violinist Nourhe Khate.

In February 2023, Venugopal published, String Quartets, Opp. 10, 12, that was recorded in Russia. The album includes two pieces, titled 'A Prayer for Mother Nature, Op. 10' and 'Conflicted Resolution, Op. 12.' He followed this up with Opp. 9 & 13, comprising 'A Soiree for the Migratory Birds, Op. 9' for wind quintet and 'A Suite for Strings & Winds, Op. 13', featuring both string and wind quintets.

In 2025, Venugopal presented Raga Poems, Op. 22 & Liberation Op. 18, in collaboration with musicians from the Bolshoi Theatre and Russian National Orchestra.

Venugopal is also known for introducing a musical instrument called Visitar along with Erisa Neogy.

Venugopal compares himself to Japanese composer Toru Takemitsu, who initially distanced himself from his native music before embracing it. He considers Igor Stravinsky, Alban Berg, Béla Bartók, Claude Debussy, John Coltrane, as well as the Indian oral rhythmic traditions of Konnakol and Bol, as his influences.

== Discography ==
- Musings (2015)
- Syncretism Vol. 1 (2016)
- The Ascent of Mt. Purpose (2018)
- Chronicles: Consolation (2019)
- Chronicles: Resolution (2020)
- An Ode to the Morphing Muse, Op. 6 (2020)
- Reveries, Op. 7 (2021)
- Moods for Violin & Piano, Op. 15 (2022)
- String Quartets, Opp. 10, 12 (2023)
- Opp. 9 & 13 (2023)
- Raga Poems, Op. 22 & Liberation, Op. 18 (2025)
- Textures for Quintet, Op. 20 & An Aeolian Triptych, Op. 19 (2025)

== Catalogue ==
Catalogue of works
Name	Opus No.	Instrumentation	Notes
Musings	Op. 1	Guitar	9 movements
Syncretism, Vol. 1	Op. 2	Guitar and electronics	3 movements
The Ascent of Mt. Purpose	Op. 3	Guitar	11 movements
Chronicles: Consolation	Op. 4	Piano	6 movements
Chronicles: Resolution	Op. 5	Different ensembles featuring trumpet, duduk, cello, bansuri, contrabass, piano, drums and electronics	4 movements; semi-improvisational
An Ode to the Morphing Muse	Op. 6	Soprano, alto, piano, guitar and cello	4 movements
Reveries	Op. 7	Violin, cello and piano	5 movements; three movements for trio, with one movement each featuring violin and piano, and cello and piano
Unnamed choral music	Op. 8	Choral music	6 movements; unpublished
A Soiree for the Migratory Birds	Op. 9	Wind quintet: flute, oboe, clarinet, horn and bassoon	3 movements
A Prayer for Mother Nature	Op. 10	String quartet	4 movements
Unnamed chamber work	Op. 11	Visitar and other instruments	Unpublished
Conflicted Resolution	Op. 12	String quartet	5 movements
A Suite for Strings & Winds	Op. 13	String quintet: two violins, viola, cello and contrabass; and wind quintet: flute, oboe, clarinet, horn and bassoon	5 movements
Unnamed operatic sketch	Op. 14	Voices and piano	1 movement completed; incomplete and unpublished
Moods for Violin & Piano	Op. 15	Violin and piano	7 movements
Duo for Clarinet & Piano	Op. 16	Clarinet and piano	4 movements
Duo for Oboe & Piano	Op. 17	Oboe and piano	4 movements
Liberation	Op. 18	Piano and string quintet: two violins, viola, cello and contrabass	4 movements
An Aeolian Triptych	Op. 19	Harp, flute and bassoon	3 movements
Textures for Quintet	Op. 20	Flute, bass clarinet, piano, violin and cello	4 movements
Unnamed piece	Op. 21	Chamber orchestra	4 movements
Raga Poems	Op. 22	Flute, piano and string quintet	3 movements
Unnamed piece	Op. 23	Chamber orchestra	4 movements
Unnamed piece	Op. 24	Chamber orchestra	4 movements
Unnamed piece	Op. 25	Chamber orchestra	2 movements
Serenade	Op. 26	Two harps and wind ensemble: flute, alto flute, clarinet, bass clarinet, bassoon, contrabassoon and horn	3 movements
Raga Poems II	Op. 27	Piano and wind ensemble: flute, alto flute, clarinet, bass clarinet, bassoon, contrabassoon and horn	3 movements
Unnamed octet	Op. 28	Harp, piano, vibraphone, flute, bass clarinet, violin, cello and contrabass	2 movements
Textures for 13 Strings	Op. 29	Thirteen strings	3 movements
Miniatures for Piano	Op. 30	Piano	5 movements
Resonances	Op. 31	Piano and vibraphone	4 movements
Duo for Contrabass & Piano	Op. 32	Contrabass and piano	3 movements
Unnamed piece	Op. 33	Brass ensemble and piano	3 movements
The Mandukya Upanishad	Op. 34	Soprano, piano and contrabass	12 movements (verses)
