= Oru Minnaminunginte Nurunguvettam =

1987 Malayalam drama film

Oru Minnaminunginte Nurunguvettam (1987)
- Theatrical release poster
- Directed by: Bharathan
- Written by: John Paul
- Produced by: M. G. Gopinath (Pandalam Gopinath); Babu Thiruvalla
- Starring: Nedumudi Venu; Sharada; Parvathy; Devan
- Cinematography: Vasant Kumar
- Edited by: Bharathan
- Music by: Johnson
- Production company: Symphony Creations
- Distributed by: Jubilee Productions
- Release date: 2 March 1987
- Running time: 108 minutes
- Country: India
- Language: Malayalam

Oru Minnaminunginte Nurunguvettam (transl. Glimpse of the light of a firefly) is a 1987 Malayalam-language drama film directed by Bharathan, written by John Paul and produced by M. G. Gopinath and Babu Thiruvalla. The film stars Nedumudi Venu, Sharada, Parvathy, and Devan in lead roles, while Innocent, and Sankaradi play supporting roles. The film is about an elderly teacher couple, who bring up a girl with devotion.

The film was jointly produced by M. G. Gopinath and Babu Thiruvalla under the banner of Symphony Creations in their first production venture. They would go on to produce the classic Amaram (1991). The film was distributed by Jubilee Productions. It features original songs composed by Johnson, with lyrics written by O. N. V. Kurup. The cinematography of the film was done by Vasant Kumar, while the editing and art direction were done by Bharathan himself.

Oru Minnaminuginte Nurunguvettam was released on 2 March 1987 to widespread critical acclaim. The film was a commercial success and was declared a hit at the box office. It won two Kerala State Film Awards - Best Actor for Nedumudi Venu and Best Film with Popular Appeal and Aesthetic Value. The film also won two Filmfare Awards South - Best Actor for Nedumudi Venu and Best Actress for Sharada. Nedumudi Venu's performance in the film is considered by critics to be one of finest and most memorable performances in his career.

== Cast ==
- Nedumudi Venu as Ravunni Nair
- Sharada as Saraswathi Amma
- Parvathy as Unnimaya/Mayamma
- Devan as Ravi
- M. S. Thripunithura as Bhadran Nampoothiripadu
- Innocent as Parameswaran Nair
- Sankaradi as Menon
- Master Vinu as Unnikrishnan, Maya and Ravi's son

== Soundtrack ==
All lyrics are written by O. N. V. Kurup; all music is composed by Johnson.

No.	Title	Artist(s)	Length
1.	"Kanmaniye"	Krishnachandran, Lathika
2.	"Madhumozhi"	Krishnachandran
3.	"Melle Melle"	K. J. Yesudas
4.	"Poovenam"	K. J. Yesudas, Lathika

== Reception ==
In a retrospect review of the film, Neelima Menon of The News Minute states that: "Oru Minnaminunginte Nurunguvettam is one of the finest collaborations between Bharathan and John Paul. Even though at the helm are an aging couple, one cannot remember a more intense love story in Malayalam cinema. This is love in all its fragility, humility and acceptance. It's about equality and giving. It's about understanding each other with a mere glance. It's about fights, laughter, misgivings and loads of undiluted love. If John Paul creates a pristine village setting for the couple to flourish and age like fine wine, Bharathan, with his magical artistry breathes life into the characters and makes us desperately fall in love with them." She further goes on to state that "Oru Minnaminunginte Nurunguvettam is one of the most beautiful love stories of all time."

The Hindu in an article praises Nedumudi Venu and Sharda's performances in the film stating that: "In Bharathan's beautiful film about an ageing couple, both former school teachers, Venu and Sharada were outstanding. It was another reminder of his versatility as an actor."

The News Minute praises Nedumudi Venu's performance in the film stating that: "Nedumudi must have played more aged characters than any of his contemporaries at one period. In this 1987 film, when he is not even 40, he plays a retired old teacher, living with his retired teacher wife (Sharada). A childless couple, their anxieties grow when they suddenly find themselves playing guardian to a teenage girl (Parvathy) who comes to stay with them. Nedumudi plays the more anxious ‘parent’ and convincingly pulls off the tense, worried, short-tempered old man, getting easily agitated with just about everyone. It brought him a best actor award from the state."

== Accolades ==
Kerala State Film Awards

- Best Film with Popular Appeal and Aesthetic Value - Bharathan and Babu Thiruvalla
- Kerala State Film Awards - Best Actor - Nedumudi Venu

Filmfare Awards South

- Filmfare Awards South for Best Actor - Nedumudi Venu
- Filmfare Awards South for Best Actress - Sharada
