= VVS Murari =

Indian classical composer and musician

- Occupation: Violinist

Vadakkencheri Sri Krishna Murari, commonly known as VVS Murari, is an Indian classical composer, violist, violinist and organizer. He is the founder of VVS Foundation. He is the son of V. V. Subramanyam.

== Early life and education ==
Murari was born into a family of musicians. He is a descendant of musical lineage of Swathi Thirunal and Muthuswami Dikshitar. His father, Nadayogi VV Subrahmanyam, and grandfather, Vadakkencheri Veeraraghava Iyer, are also noted musicians.

== Career ==
Murari received his early training of carnatic music from Semmangudi Srinivasa Iyer.

In 2015, Murari introduced Carnatic Philharmonic Orchestra, which combined Indian classical and western classical, at Cleveland Thyagara Festival.

In 2017, Murari included a cappella into carnatic music, which was later premiered at the Cleveland Thyagaraja Festival as part of his production Panchamukhi.

In 2019, Murari started Margazhi festival.

Murari is also the founder of VVS Foundation and SaMaa Arts.

== Awards and recognition ==
- The Music Academy Madras
