= Priya R. Pai =

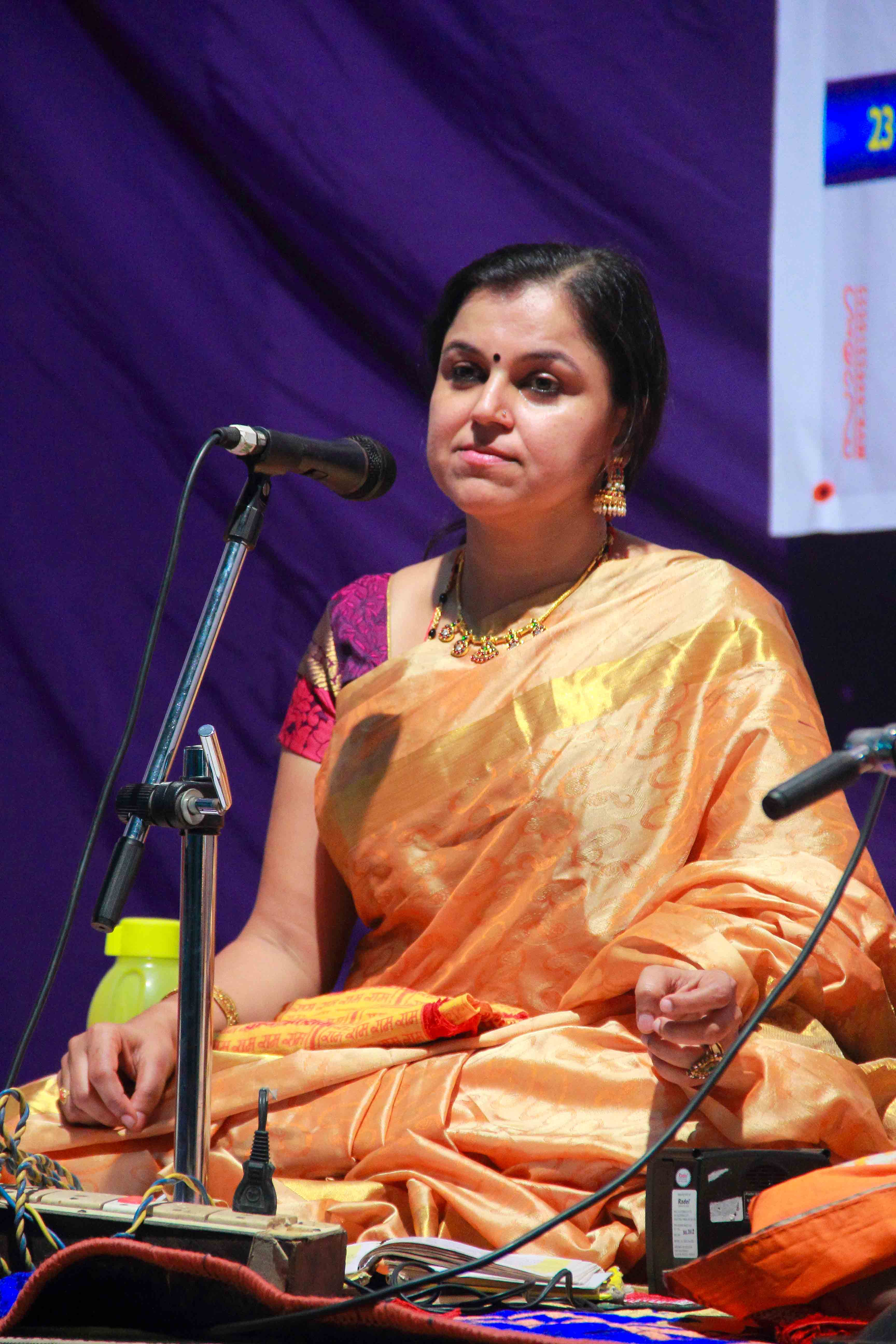
- Priya R Pai in sangeet academy concert

Background information
- Born: 3 February 1976 (age 50); Idukki
- Genres: Playback singing, Carnatic music
- Occupations: Singer, music teacher

Priya R. Pai is a Carnatic vocalist, composer and playback singer. She is the host of musical TV show Layatharang on Kairali we channel. She is famous for Karnatic-western fusion music and has released five albums. On the album Harshamo Dukhamo she sang poems by former minister Binoy Viswam. She also sings and composes devotional and Classical songs.

She has more than 1000 recorded songs in various Indian languages including Malayalam, Tamil, Telugu, Kannada, Sanskrit, Hindi, Konkani, and Marathi.She is conducting a music school 'Saveri School of Music' where she trains more than 200 students. She is the recipient of Senior Scholarship from Human Resources Development by the Central Government of India and an accreditation award for Carnatic Music from Kalady Sree Sankara School of Music and Dance. She has composed and sung in more than 30 classical fusion albums. She was the host of Musical TV show 'Laya Tharang' in Kairali we channel. She has been rendering Narayaneeyam and Bhaagavatham in the program 'Sandhya Deepam' in Amrita Channel for the past 6 years. And also she was the host for the program 'Sangamam' in Jeevan TV. She has sung the title song for the famous TV show in Amrita Channel 'Kadhayallithu Jeevitham'.

== Early life ==
Born in Idukki District, Kerala into a family of musicians, Priya's father, was a Mridangist. Her younger sister Praveena is also a singer.

She did her studies in Trivandrum in Cotton Hills GHS, NSS College, Mar Ivanios College, and Women's College Tvm. She is a double degree holder of both Maths and Music and also she did her PG in Music. Priya received her training in Carnatic Music from Valiyammal also known as Pattu Maami who lived at Karamana. She also learned music from Sree Varkala C.S Jayaram and Sree N.P Ramaswamy.

She was selected for the National talent search scholarship from the Central Government from 1988 to 1992.

== Personal life ==
Priya R Pai is married to Remesh Pai VP. They have 2 daughters, Shradha R Pai and Shreya R Pai who are also singers. Freelance Mridangist Abhimanyu Kamath is her son in law (husband of Shradha R Pai).

== Music school ==
In 2004, Priya R Pai established a music school 'Saveri School of Music' at Edappally, Ernakulam and now it has 2 more branches at Thevakkal, Ernakulam and Bengaluru where more than 200 students are learning classical music.

== Albums ==
- Bhava Tarang
- Manasa Sancharare
- Kishna Nee Begane Baro
- Kriti Malika
- Vishnu Sahasranamam
- Lalitha Sahasranamam
- Om Bhavani
- Soundaryalahari
- Mahadeva Shiva Shambho
- Raga Sudharasa
- Unnai Adainthen
- Thillana
- Harshamo Dukkhamo
- Pancharatna Kritis
- Adathu Asangathu Vaa Kanna
- Coffee at MG Road
- Slokamalika

== Performances ==
- Soorya Festival- Performed at Soorya Festival (Soorya Ramayanotsav)
- Sangeetha Nataka Academy- Concert at Thrissur, Palakkad and
- National Museum, Delhi-Performed at National Museum Janapat Road conducted by the Central Government of India.
- Chembai Sangeetholsavam, Guruvayur

== Films ==
- Anchil Oral Arjunan – Sukrutham Sudha Mayam (music by Mohan sithara)
- Kaazhcha – Dup Dup Janaki
- Ozhimuri – Brova Baramma ( Classical Composition).

== TV shows ==
- Layatharang – Kairali WE
- Sandhyadeepam – Amrita TV
- KadhayallithuJeevitham- Amrita TV
- Sangamam- Jeevan TV
- Aalap – Asianet News
