= Rudra Simhasanam =

2015 Indian film by Shibu Gangadharan

- Theatrical release poster
- Directed by: Shibu Gangadharan
- Written by: Sunil Parameswaran
- Based on: Rudra Simhasanam by Sunil Parameswaran
- Produced by: Anilan Madhavan; Ashok Ammoos Varkala
- Starring: Suresh Gopi; Nikki Galrani; Kaniha; Shweta Menon
- Cinematography: Jithu Damodar
- Edited by: Zian Sreekanth
- Music by: Viswajith
- Production company: Hemambika Golden Rays
- Distributed by: Celebrate Cinema
- Release date: 31 July 2015
- Running time: 177 minutes
- Country: India
- Language: Malayalam

Rudra Simhasanam (transl. The Throne of Rudra) is a 2015 Indian Malayalam-language thriller film directed by Shibu Gangadharan and written by Sunil Parameswaran based on his novel of the same name. It stars Suresh Gopi in the title role, alongside Nikki Galrani, Shwetha Menon, Kaniha, Nedumudi Venu, Devan, Kalabhavan Shajohn, Nishanth Sagar and Sudheer Karamana. The film was released on 31 July 2015.

== Plot ==
The story tells about dark magic and coming back to the source of problems to find solace. Other themes that the film explores is greed, illicit relations, betrayal and love in different forms.

== Cast ==
- Suresh Gopi as Rudra Simhan
- Nikki Galrani as Haimavathi (later Mrinalini)
- Kalabhavan Shajohn as Abdullah
- Kaniha as Mohini
- Hari Menon as Unni Raja
- Shweta Menon as Umayamma
- Nedumudi Venu as Shiva Thaannu
- Nishanth Sagar as Harikrishnan
- Sudheer Karamana as Kunnathur Dhaagha Dhaagha Bhairavan
- Devan as Neelakanda Varma
- Sunil Sukhada as Advocate Mukkodan

== Production ==
This film was written by Sunil Parameswaran after the 2005 film Anandabhadram. He wrote the script for the film based on his own novel, Rudra Simhasanam. Anilan Madhavan and Ashok Ammoos Varkala produced the film under the banner of Hemambika Golden Rays. The film was shot at Varikkasseri Mana.

== Music ==
The music was composed by Viswajith, while the lyrics were written by Jayasree Kishore. The audio rights were acquired by Manorama Music and the soundtrack album consists of 5 tracks.

Track listing
No.	Title	Singer(s)	Length
1.	"Kanne Kannare"	Subbalakshmi, G. Venugopal, Kavalam Sreekumar, Kalabhavan Sabu, Rimi Tomy	5:05
2.	"Kaathil Parayumo"	Viswajith, Priya Jerson	4:23
3.	"Ninnale Innen"	K. S. Chithra	4:22
4.	"Kaathil Parayumo"	Viswajith, Sithara	4:21
5.	"Kathunna Sooryante"	Anwar Sadhath	3:54
Total length:			22:05

== Critical reception ==
Deepa Soman of The Times of India gave 2 out of 5 stars and wrote "Rudra Simhasanam suffers from a serious dearth of anything that's even mildly engaging."
