= Nedumudi Venu =

Indian actor and screenwriter (1944–2021)

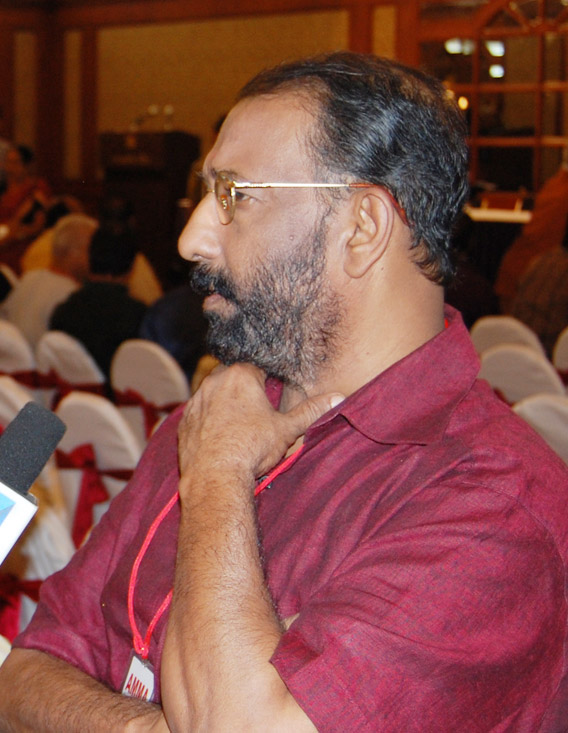
- Nedumudi Venu in 2008
- Born: Kesavan Venugopal; 22 May 1948; Nedumudi, Alappuzha district, Kerala
- Died: 11 October 2021 (aged 73); Thiruvananthapuram, Kerala
- Occupations: Actor; screenwriter
- Years active: 1972–2021
- Works: Full list
- Spouse: T. R. Susheela

Kesavan Venugopal (22 May 1948 – 11 October 2021), better known by his stage name Nedumudi Venu, was an Indian actor and screenwriter from Kerala, who predominantly worked in Malayalam cinema. He acted in more than 500 films, primarily in Malayalam and also in Tamil, in a career spanning nearly five decades. He wrote screenplays and directed one film. Nedumudi Venu won three National Film Awards, three Filmfare Award South and six Kerala State Film Awards for his performances in various movies.

== Early life ==
Venu was born as K. Venugopal at Nedumudi in the Alappuzha district of Kerala to P. K. Kesava Pillai, a schoolmaster, and P. Kunjikkuttiyamma, on 22 May 1948. He was the youngest of five sons born to his parents.

Venu studied at Nair Samajam School in Nedumudi and at St. Mary's School in Champakulam. He then did his B.A. in Malayalam at Sanatana Dharma College, Alappuzha. After graduation, he worked briefly as a journalist at the Kalakaumudi magazine and taught at a tutorial college before moving into theater and movies.

Venu was married to Susheela in 1982. The couple has two sons: Unni and Kannan. Mereena James and Vrindha Nair are his daughters-in-law.

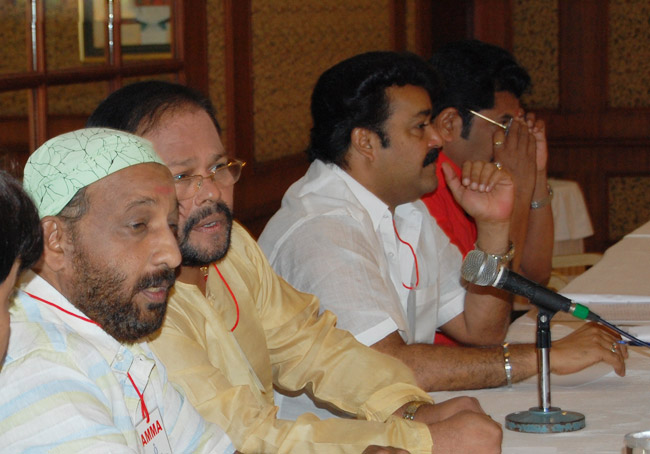
From left Nedumudi Venu, Innocent, Mohanlal and Mukesh, on the main stage of the general body meeting of the Association of Malayalam Movie Artists.

== Death ==
Venu died at KIMS Hospital in Thiruvananthapuram on 11 October 2021, at the age of 73. He was receiving treatment for liver cancer prior to his death and died from COVID-19 complications. Diabetes had also complicated his condition. He was cremated with full state honours at Santhikavadam Crematorium in Thiruvananthapuram on 12 October 2021.

== Awards ==
=== National Film Awards ===
- 1990 – Best Supporting Actor – His Highness Abdullah
- 2003 – Special Mention – Margam
- 2006 – National Film Award for Best Non-Feature Film Narration / Voice Over – Minukku

=== Kerala State Film Awards ===
- 1980 – Second Best Actor – Chamaram
- 1981 – Best Actor – Vida Parayum Munpe
- 1986 - Second Best Actor - Thalavattam
- 1987 – Best Actor – Oru Minnaminunginte Nurunguvettam
- 1990 – Special Jury Award – Bharatham, Santhwanam
- 1994 – Second Best Actor – Thenmavin Kombath
- 2003 – Best Actor – Margam

=== Kerala State Television Awards ===
- 2001 - Best Actor : Avasthatarangal

=== Asianet Film Awards ===
- 2005 – Best Supporting Actor Award – Thanmatra
- 2007 – Best Script Writer Award – Thaniye
- 2011 – Best Supporting Actor – Best Actor, Elsamma Enna Aankutty
- 2013 – Best Character Actor – North 24 Kaatham
- 2015 – Best Villain – Oru Second Class Yathra, Rudra Simhasanam
- 2017 – Asianet Film Award for Lifetime Achievement

=== Vanitha Film Awards ===
2015 – Best Actor In A Negative Role – Oru Second Class Yatra

=== Filmfare Awards ===
- 1981 – Filmfare Award for Best Actor – Malayalam – Vida Parayum Munpe
- 1987 – Filmfare Award for Best Actor – Malayalam -Oru Minnaminunginte Nurunguvettam
- 1997 – Lifetime Achievement Award

=== Kerala Film Critics Association Awards ===
- 2007 – Second Best Actor – Thaniye
- 2007 – Lifetime Achievement Award/Prathibha Puraskaram

=== Other awards ===
- 2003 – Best Actor Award won in Television Gallup Poll conducted by University of Kerala union for Ragardram (Doordarshan)
- 2006 – Sathyan Award
- 2006 – Kalavedi International Prathibha Award was presented at Tagore Theatre, Trivandrum in 2006.
- 2007 – Bahadoor Award
- 2008 – Kala Ratnam Award of KALA Abu Dhabi
- 2011 – Serve India Media Award
- 2015 – Vanitha Film Award for Best Villain for Oru Second Class Yathra and Rudra Simhasanam
- 2007 – Saira – Best Actor award at the Zimbabwe International Film Festival
