= Keyaar =

Indian film director

- Born: Kothanda Ramaiah; 1 January 1953 (age 73); Chennai, Tamil Nadu, India
- Other name: K. R.
- Occupations: Film director, producer, distributor, exhibitor, media personality
- Years active: 1975–present

Kothanda Ramaiah (also known as K. R. and Keyaar) is an Indian film director, producer, distributor and exhibitor. He has held various leading positions in different film industry organizations.

== Career ==
KR studied film processing at the Adyar Film Institute in Chennai in 1972. Upon graduation in 1975, he spent three years as a technician in Doordarshan Kendra. KR made his debut film as a director and producer with the Malayalam film Sisirathil Oru Vasantham. Prior to its release, the film faced a number of distribution problems and was eventually released by Suguna Screens in 1980. Although the film failed at the box office, it provided him the incentive to move into film distribution and exhibition across Tamil Nadu covering territories including: Chennai City, North Arcot, South Arcot, Chengelpet, Pondicherry, and Tirupathi. He distributed successful films such as: Thillu Mullu, Thai Veedu, Vaidehi Kathirunthal, Sindhu Bhairavi, Punnagai Mannan, Chinna Poove Mella Pesu, Michael Madana Kama Rajan, Poovizhi Vasalile, Guru Sishyan, Mappillai, Rajadhi Raja, and My Dear Kuttichathan 3D in Tamil.

Since 1991, KR has directed and produced a series of medium budget films. His directorial debut in Tamil Eeramana Rojave featured new actors and was a huge commercial success. His most notable collaborations are with actors Vijayakanth, Ramki, Khushbu, and with Urvashi on several occasions. In total he has directed fourteen feature films. His film Dancer, released in 2005, most notable for its protagonist who was a one legged dancer played by Kutty, a highly talented and disabled artist, won the National Award, three State Awards, and an award at the prestigious Canadian film festival. The film also had a special screening at the London Disability Arts Forum.

His involvement in film production includes producing and financing over forty films in various Indian Languages. While he was involved in film distribution he was also an exhibitor with twenty-eight theatres leased across: Tamil Nadu, Pondicherry, and Tirupathi; he also ran the Sathyam Cinemas in Chennai from 1984 to 1993.

He has played a role in some of the landmarks of Tamil cinema including: India's First ever 3D My Dear Kuttichathan in Tamil and Telugu; Pesum Padam a movie without dialogue starring Kamalhassan; Maaveeran starring Rajinikanth; the first 70mm Tamil Film, Engalayum Vazha Vidungal a film which was notable for animals talking on screen; Spy Kids 3D using Anaglyph technology for the first time; and Jai Vedalam the first film to be released in 3D in four languages.

He was elected president of the Tamil Film Producers' Council (TFPC) in 2013 and has worked on issues including title registration, financially supporting bankrupt producers, and helping see through the release of delayed projects. Other initiatives include streamlining and reducing the cost of publicity and having actors participate in all promotional activities for their films.

KR has also written a book Idhuthaan Cinema (This is Cinema) in Tamil published in 2003. It details the nuances of cinema and predicts its future viewed from today. He has been an authority on cinema since the early 1980s giving the industry insights and a way forward for the years ahead.

KR worked at Raadaan Mediaworks as vice president.

== Member and honorary positions ==
| Post | Organisation | Notes |
|---|---|---|
| Chairman of the Jury | Chennai International Film Festival - Tamil Feature Film Category | Dec 2022 |
| President | Tamil Film Producers' Council | From 2013 – 2014 |
| President | South Indian Film Chamber of Commerce | From 2000 – 2001 |
| Jury Member | National Film Awards | 2001 |
| Vice President | South Indian Film Chamber of Commerce | From 1985 – 2000 Several Occasions |
| Member | South Indian Film Chamber of Commerce | From 1985, representing Dispute Committee, Title Registration, Publicity Clearance, Property Development Committee, Management Committee of Cinema Centenary Club |
| Chair Person | National Award Selection Committee | For "Wholesome Entertainment" |
| Chair Person | National Award Selection Committee | For "Oscar Award" in the category of "Best Foreign Film Award" |
| General Secretary | South Indian Film & TV Directors Association | |
| Founder President | Tamil Film Chamber of Commerce | From 1987 – 1991 |
| Founder, Permanent Trustee | Tamil Film Producers' Welfare Trust | Founded in 1994 |
| Former President | Madras City, Chengai District Film Distributors Welfare Association | From 1985 – 1988 |

He was one of the members of an eight-member advisory committee, which included several personalities from across the country, to advise the Honorable Union Minister in the Indian Ministry of Information and Broadcasting Mrs.Sushma Swaraj on major issues related to policy and other matters pertaining to the Indian film industry in 2001.

He also served on the five-member committee appointed by the Government of Tamil Nadu in 1989 to study and submit a white paper on the state of the Tamil Film Industry.

== Filmography ==
=== As director ===
| Year | Film | Notes |
|---|---|---|
| 1980 | Shishirathil Oru Vasantham | Malayalam film; Also producer |
| 1991 | Eeramana Rojave | Also producer |
| 1994 | Vanaja Girija | |
| 1995 | Mayabazar | |
| 1996 | Irattai Roja | Remake of Telugu film Shubha Lagnam |
| 1996 | Enakkoru Magan Pirappan | Remake of Malayalam film Aadyathe Kanmani |
| 1996 | Alexander | |
| 1997 | Thaali Pudhusu | Remake of Telugu film Aame |
| 1998 | Kavalai Padathe Sagodhara | Remake of Malayalam film Kalyanji Anandji |
| 1998 | Dharma | Remake of Hindi film Ziddi |
| 1998 | Kumbakonam Gopalu | Remake of Kannada film Gauri Ganesha |
| 1999 | Suyamvaram | |
| 2000 | Kadhal Rojave | Remake of Hindi film Dil Hai Ke Manta Nahin |
| 2005 | Dancer | Also producer; Tamil Nadu State Film Award for Best Producer |

=== As distributor ===
| Year | Film | Role | | Notes |
| Year | Film | Producer | Distributor | Notes |
|---|---|---|---|---|
| 1981 | Thillu Mullu | | Yes | |
| 1981 | Ram Lakshman | | Yes | |
| 1981 | Enga Ooru Kannagi | | Yes | |
| 1982 | Nenjil Oru Raagam | | Yes | |
| 1982 | Ranga | | Yes | |
| 1982 | Rani Theni | | Yes | |
| 1982 | Payanangal Mudivathillai | | Yes | |
| 1982 | Deviyin Thiruvilayadal | | Yes | |
| 1982 | Poi Satchi | | Yes | |
| 1982 | Naan Kudithu Konde Irrupen | | Yes | |
| 1983 | Thalaiyanai manthiram | | Yes | |
| 1983 | Sashti Viratham | | Yes | |
| 1983 | Thai Veedu | | Yes | |
| 1984 | Vaidehi Kathirunthal | | Yes | |
| 1984 | Vazhkai | | Yes | |
| 1984 | My Dear Kuttichathan 3D | | Yes | India's first 3D film |
| 1984 | Nalla Naal | | Yes | |
| 1984 | Thambikku Entha Ooru | | Yes | |
| 1984 | Anbulla Rajinikanth | | Yes | |
| 1984 | Kuva Kuva Vaathugal | | Yes | |
| 1985 | Paadum Vaanampadi | Yes | | |
| 1985 | Mard (Hindi film) | | Yes | Distribution rights South India & Remake rights Tamil |
| 1985 | Paadum Paravaigal | Yes | | Dubbed version of Anveshana |
| 1985 | Japanil Kalyanaraman | | Yes | |
| 1985 | Aduthathu Albert | | Yes | |
| 1985 | Poove Poochooda Vaa | | Yes | |
| 1985 | Avan | | Yes | |
| 1985 | Anthasthu | | Yes | |
| 1985 | Padikkaatha Pannaiyar | | Yes | |
| 1985 | Naane Raja Naane Mandhiri | | Yes | |
| 1985 | Sindhu Bhairavi | | Yes | |
| 1985 | Jai Vedalam 3D | Yes | Yes | Dubbed version of Jai Vedalam |
| 1985 | Kunguma Chimil | | Yes | |
| 1985 | Poo Ondru Puyalaanadhu | | Yes | Dubbed version of Pratighatana |
| 1986 | Vikram | | Yes | |
| 1986 | Punnagai Mannan | | Yes | |
| 1986 | Mythili Ennai Kaathali | | Yes | |
| 1986 | Maaveeran | | Yes | First Tamil film in 70mm |
| 1987 | Chinna Poove Mella Pesu | | Yes | |
| 1987 | Velaikaran | | Yes | |
| 1987 | Manathil Uruthi Vendum | | Yes | |
| 1987 | Thirumathi Oru Vegumathi | | Yes | |
| 1987 | Enga Ooru Pattukaran | | Yes | |
| 1987 | Pesum Padam | | Yes | |
| 1988 | En Jeevan Paduthu | | Yes | |
| 1988 | Illam | | Yes | |
| 1988 | Manamagale Vaa | | Yes | |
| 1988 | Paravaigal Palavitham | Yes | Yes | |
| 1989 | Solaikuyil | | Yes | |
| 1989 | Maapillai | | Yes | |
| 1992 | Raasukutti | | Yes | |
| 1990 | Michael Madana Kama Rajan | | Yes | |
| 1990 | Pengal Veetin Kangal | | Yes | |
| 1991 | Gunaa | | Yes | |
| 1991 | Thanthu Vitten Ennai | | Yes | |
| 1992 | Aavarampoo | Yes | Yes | |
| 1992 | Chinna Marumagal | Yes | Yes | |
| 1994 | Veera | | Yes | |
| 2007 | Parattai Engira Azhagu Sundaram | Yes | | |
| 2015 | I | | Yes | via Global United Media |
| 2015 | Yagavarayinum Naa Kaakka | | Yes | via Global United Media |
| 2015 | Baahubali | | Yes | via Global United Media (Tamil/ Malayalam/ Telugu) |
| 2015 | Lord Livingstone 7000 Kandi | | Yes | via Global United Media |
| 2015 | Thoongavanam | | Yes | via Global United Media |
| 2016 | The Jungle Book | | Yes | via Global United Media |
| 2016 | Kammatipaadam | | Yes | via Global United Media |
| 2016 | Devi(L) | | Yes | via Global United Media |
| 2017 | Baahubali: The Conclusion | | Yes | via Global United Media |
| 2017 | Sherlock Toms | | Yes | via Global United Media |
| 2017 | Mersal | | Yes | via Global United Media |
| 2018 | K.G.F: Chapter 1 | | Yes | KR Infotainment |
| 2019 | Yatra | | Yes | KR Infotainment |
| 2022 | Aayiram Porkasugal | | Yes | KR Infotainment |

=== As actor ===
- Pondatti Thevai (1990)
- Kadhal Virus (2002)
