= Global United Media =

Indian film company

- Industry: Film, Media
- Founded: 2014; 12 years ago
- Founder: Prem Menon
- Key people: Prem Menon (Director)
- Products: Motion pictures
- Website: www.globalunitedmedia.in

Global United Media is a corporate entity in the Indian film markets formed in March 2014. The company's core engagement is film production, acquisition and distribution across languages, genres and territories. Global United Media has distributed films such as K.G.F: Chapter 1, Baahubali: The Beginning (2015), I (2015) across Kerala.

== Team ==
- Prem Menon (Director)

== History ==
Global United Media Company Pvt Ltd was formed in March 2014, under the leadership of Mr. Prem Menon. Founded for film production, acquisition and distribution across languages, genres and territories.

== Films ==
=== Film productions ===
No	Year	Film	Actors	Director	Language
1	2015	Lord Livingstone 7000 Kandi	Kunchako Boban, Bharath, Reenu Mathews, Nedumudi Venu, Sunny Wayne, Chemban Vinod Jose, Jacob Gregory, Sudheer Karamana	Anil Radhakrishnan Menon	Malayalam
2	2016	Kammatipaadam	Dulquer Salmaan	Rajeev Ravi	Malayalam
3	2017	Sherlock Toms	Biju Menon	Shafi	Malayalam

=== As a distributor ===
Year	Film	Language	Territory	Notes
2015	I	Tamil	Kerala	
2015	Yagavarayinum Naa Kaakka	Tamil	Tamil Nadu	
2015	Baahubali: The Beginning	Tamil, Malayalam (Dubbed version)	Kerala	
2015	Thoongaavanam	Tamil	Tamil Nadu* NSC	Released with Escape Artists Motion Pictures, Wide Angle Creations
2016	The Jungle Book	English,	Kerala |	Indian release 8 April 2016
2016	Devi(L)	Tamil	Kerala	
2017	Baahubali: The Conclusion	Tamil, Malayalam (Dubbed version)	Kerala	
2017	Mersal	Tamil	Kerala	
2018	Thobama	Malayalam	Kerala, rest of India, worldwide	Produced by Alphonse Puthren
2018	K.G.F: Chapter 1	Malayalam (Dubbed version)	Kerala	
2019	Yatra	Malayalam (Dubbed version)	Yola	
2025	Baahubali: The Epic	Malayalam, Tamil		

== Achievements ==
Global United Media was awarded the Record by Guinness World Records for World's Largest Poster for the film Baahubali which was created during the Audio Launch Event at Kochi, Kerala. The reference book made the declaration on its official website. "The largest poster has an area of 4,793.65 sq m (51,598.21 sq ft) and was achieved by Global United Media Company Pvt Ltd (India) in Kochi, India, on 27 June 2015," it said.
