= Eeramana Rojave =

- Theatrical release poster
- Directed by: Keyaar
- Written by: Keyaar
- Produced by: Keyaar
- Starring: Shiva Subramanian; Mohini; Srividya; Nassar
- Cinematography: Nambi
- Edited by: B. Lenin; V. T. Vijayan
- Music by: Ilaiyaraaja
- Production company: K. R. Enterprises
- Release date: 12 January 1991
- Running time: 139 minutes
- Country: India
- Language: Tamil

Eeramana Rojave (transl. The Wet Rose) is a 1991 Indian Tamil-language romantic drama film, written, directed and produced by Keyaar. The film stars newcomer Shiva Subramaniam, Mohini, Srividya and Nassar. It was released on 12 January 1991. The film was remade in Hindi as Abhi Abhi (1992).

== Plot ==
Shanthi and Siva go to the same college and after some initial misunderstandings, fall in love. A psychotic fellow student, known as Helmet, tortures any couple he sees that are in love. He's sadistic and despises love. Shanthi's friend Anitha and her boyfriend Ravi are killed by Helmet. This spurs Shanthi to stand up against him. Helmet conspires to get Siva expelled as revenge and Shanthi, in turn, has Helmet arrested. Shanthi's rich father JK learns about his daughter's love and arranges her marriage with the son of his friend. The young couple run away with the help of Shanthi's grandmother but fall into Helmet's sadistic hands. The young couple must escape his clutches and change JK's mind.

== Cast ==
- Shiva Subramaniam as Shiva
- Mohini as Shanthi
- Srividya as Shanthi's grandmother
- Nassar as JK
- Vennira Aadai Moorthy as Tamil Professor
- Chinni Jayanth as Maari
- Kula Deivam V. R. Rajagopal as Chellaiah
- Kumarimuthu
- Thyagu
- Disco Shanthi
- Hema as Shanthi's friend

== Production ==
Eeramana Rojave is the acting debut of Shiva Subramaniam and first leading role for Mohini. The film's title is derived from a song from Ilamai Kaalangal (1983). This was Keyaar's debut film in Tamil as director though prior to this he directed a Malayalam film in 1980 titled Shishirathil Oru Vasantham. The filming was held at an island at Udupi for 11 days.

== Soundtrack ==
The music was composed by Ilaiyaraaja. The song "Adho Mega Oorvalam" is set to the Carnatic raga Vasanthi. For the dubbed Telugu version Premalekhalu, all songs were written by Rajasri.

Song	Singers	Lyrics	Length
"Adho Mega Oorvalam"	Mano, Sunanda	Pulamaipithan	05:05
"Kalakalakum Maniosai"	Mano, S. Janaki	Piraisoodan	04:49
"Thendral Kaatre"	K. J. Yesudas, S. Janaki	Vaali	04:52
"Vaa Vaa Anbe"	K. J. Yesudas, S. Janaki	Vaali	05:04
"Adichachu Lucky Prize"	Mano, Arunmozhi	Vaali	04:22
"Vanna Poongavanam"	K. S. Chithra	Muthulingam	04:49
"Kalyana Tharagare"	Malaysia Vasudevan, Mano, Deepan Chakravarthy, S. N. Surendar	Gangai Amaran	04:45

Telugu
No.	Title	Singer(s)	Length
1.	"Vayasa Brindaavanam"	K. S. Chithra	4:46
2.	"Neeve Neeve"	S. P. Balasubrahmanyam, K. S. Chithra	5:07
3.	"Thagilindi"	S. P. Balasubrahmanyam, G. Anand, Vandemataram Srinivas	4:19
4.	"Adho Megha Thoranam"	S. P. Balasubrahmanyam, K. S. Chithra	5:09
5.	"Siri Siri Malliya"	S. P. Balasubrahmanyam, K. S. Chithra	4:56
6.	"O Chirugali"	S. P. Balasubrahmanyam, K. S. Chithra	4:55
7.	"College"	S. P. Balasubrahmanyam, G. Anand, Vandemataram Srinivas	4:47
Total length:			34:04

== Release and reception ==
Eeramana Rojave was released on 12 January 1991. N. Krishnaswamy of The Indian Express wrote, "Despite the cliched theme the script maintains the suspense." The film was successful at box-office.
