= Jayesh Nair =

Indian cinematographer

- Born: Jayesh Nair; 3 March 1980 (age 46)
- Education: Film and Television Institute of India
- Occupations: Cinematographer, producer
- Years active: 2017–present
- Spouse: Radhika Padmakumar
- Parent(s): Sathyaseelan & Radha
- Website: www.www.jayeshsnair.com

Jayesh Nair (born 3 March 1980) is an Indian cinematographer who primarily works in the Hindi and Malayalam film industries. An alumnus of the Film and Television Institute of India (FTII), Pune, and the Sir J. J. Institute of Applied Art, Mumbai.

== Filmography ==
As Cinematographer
| Year | Film | Director | Notes |
|---|---|---|---|
| 2023 | Grrr | JK | |
| 2021 | Madam Chief Minister | Subhash Kapoor | |
| 2021 | The Last Hour | Amit Kumar and Anupama Minz | Webseries |
| TBD | Uma | Tathagata singha | |
| TBD | Once Upon two times | Sonakshi Mittal | |
| TBD | River by the Rain | Suraj Sharda | |
| 2017 | Varnyathil Aashanka | Sidharth Bharathan | |
| 2017 | Mukkabaaz | Anurag Kashyap | |
| 2015 | Lord Livingstone 7000 Kandi | Anil Radhakrishnan Menon | |
| 2014 | Sapthamashree Thaskaraha | Anil Radhakrishnan Menon | |
| 2013 | North 24 Kaatham | Anil Radhakrishnan Menon | |
