= Prem Menon =

Indian media personality and businessman

- Born: 28 July 1952 (age 72); Chennai, Tamil Nadu, India
- Occupation: Media personality
- Spouse: Usha
- Children: Arjun Menon

Prem Menon (born 28 July 1952) is a prominent media personality, businessman and philanthropist based in Chennai. Prem was the Vice President of India's first regional television channel Asianet in 1992. He also served as the Business Head of Zee Entertainment Enterprises and Zee News and was responsible for the success of Zee's regional television channel Zee Tamizh. Prem is currently the managing director at Global United Media Company Pvt Ltd. Prem has also appeared in several television commercials and has appeared in cameo roles in several feature films.

== Early life ==
Prem was born to MM Menon, general manager of the then Hindustan Levers Pvt. Ltd. and Ammu Menon in Chennai. He went to school at St. Bede's Anglo Indian Higher Secondary School and later graduated from the Madras Christian College in Political Science. Throughout college, he was always inclined towards dramatics, theatre and was keen in pursuing a career in the entertainment industry. Prem was also the cultural secretary at MCC. After graduation, Prem worked for several organizations including Hindustan Levers Pvt Ltd, Wockhardt Pvt Ltd and Zubair Automotive in Oman. After working in Oman for over three years, Prem returned to India in 1986, and went on to set up PC India – one of the first computer hardware dealership firms in the country, along with his friends. A few years later, Prem decided to pursue his dream, quit PC India, to help set up the Malayalam Entertainment channel Asianet along with his college friend Sashi Kumar.

== Career and media ==
Prem Menon joined Asianet as Vice President and was responsible for the channels success. Some of Prem's super hit concepts included programs like Sthree, Comicola, and the prestigious Asianet Film Awards. After leaving Asianet in 2001, Prem had a stint at several organizations including positions like Vice President – Zee Network and President – Malar Network. Prem rejoined Zee Network as Business Head of Zee Tamil and Zee News in 2009 and was instrumental in building the Zee Tamizh. Some of the hit series that were telecast during his tenure included Solvathellam Unmai and Zee Sa Re Ga Ma Pa Challenge. In 2013, Prem left Zee Network to end his long career in the Indian television industry and joined Global United Media, a company whose core engagements are film production, acquisition and distribution which was an instant success with releases like I and Baahubali across Kerala. Prem has appeared in several TV commercials including Horlicks, Bharath Matrimony, Citibank and has even played cameo roles in movies like Sivaji and Dancer.

== Filmography ==
=== As distributor ===
Year	Title	Language	Notes
2015	I	Tamil and Malayalam	Kerala Distribution. Record opening and Largest state wide release (232 theatres) in Kerala. Highest grosser for Non Malayalam film in Kerala box office.
2015	Yagavarayinum Naa Kaakka	Tamil	Worldwide Distribution
2015	Baahubali	Tamil, Telugu and Malayalam	Kerala Distribution. Credited with creating the largest poster in the world – Featured in the Guinness Book of World Records
2015	Thoongavanam	Tamil	NCR Distribution
2016	The Jungle Book	English	Kerala Distribution via Disney India
2016	Devi(L)	Tamil/Malayalam	Kerala Distribution
2017	Baahubali 2: The Conclusion	Tamil, Telugu and Malayalam	Kerala Distribution
2017	Mersal	Tamil	Kerala Distribution

=== As producer ===
Year	Title	Language
2015	Lord Livingstone 7000 Kandi	Malayalam
2016	Kammatipaadam	Malayalam
2017	Sherlock Toms	Malayalam

== Personal life ==
Prem is married to Usha. They have one son, musician Arjun Menon and daughter-in-law Preethi.
