= S. George =

Indian makeup artist and producer

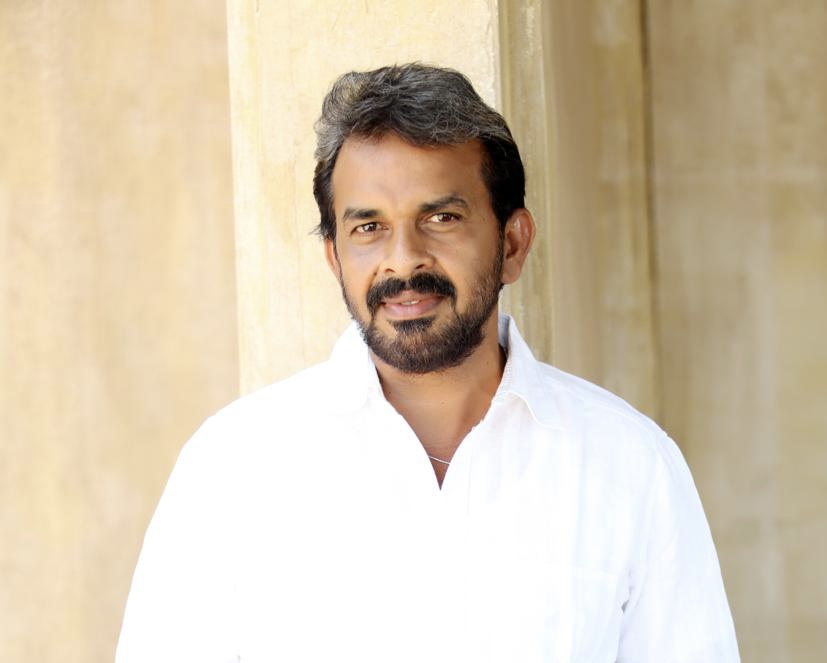
- Born: George Sebastian; 8 June 1968 (age 58); Alleppey
- Occupations: Film producer; distributor; makeup artist
- Years active: 1992–present
- Spouse: Usha George
- Children: 2
- Parent: M. O. Devasia (father)

George Sebastian, better known as S. George, is an Indian makeup artist and film producer who works in Malayalam film industry. He is the son of M. O. Devasia. He is noted for his recurring collaboration with Mammootty, associating with him in more than 25 films and later becoming his personal makeup man.

He has won the Kerala Film Critics Association Award for Karutha Pakshikal (2008) and Kerala State Film Award for Best Makeup for Paleri Manikyam: Oru Pathirakolapathakathinte Katha (2010) and Kerala State Film Award for Best Film (as producer) for Nanpakal Nerathu Mayakkam (2022).

== Early life and family ==
Hailing from Alleppey, George was born to M.O Devasia, who was one of the leading makeup artists of Malayalam Cinema. He had his schooling in Chennai and later joined Malayalam cinema as an assistant to his father. George is married to Usha George. The couple has two daughters named Cynthia George and Cylvia George.

== Career ==
George began his career as an assistant makeup artist to his father M.O Devasia through the 1991 film Neelagiri which was directed by I V Sasi. This also marked his long-time association with the veteran actor Mammooty. George collaborated with Mammooty in more than 25 major films and later went on to become Mammootty's personal makeup man. He is debut as an independent makeup artist happened through the movie Kauravar which was directed by Joshiy

In 2013, George entered into film production by producing the movie Immanuel which was directed by Lal Jose and had Mammootty and Fahad Fasil on the lead. Following which he produced movies like Achaa Din & Puzhu.

== Awards ==
- 2010 - 40th Kerala Film Critics Association Award for Best Makeup for Paleri Manikyam: Oru Pathirakolapathakathinte Katha
- 2023 - 53rd Kerala State Film Award for Best Film (as producer) for Nanpakal Nerathu Mayakkam

== Filmography ==
=== As producer ===
No.	Film	Year	Director	Lead
1	Immanuel (film)	2013	Lal Jose	Mammooty, Fahad Fasil
2	Last Supper	2014	Vinil Vasu	Unni Mukundan, Pearle Maaney
3	Acha Dhin	2015	Marthandan	Mammooty,
4	Puzhu	2021	Ratheena Rasheed	Mammootty, Parvathy Thiruvothu,

=== As Make Up Artist ===
Year	Title	Notes
2022	Puzhu†	
2021	Bheeshma Parvam	
2021	One	
2021	The Priest	
2020	Shylock	
2019	Mamangam	
2019	Ganagandharvan	
2019	Pathinettam Padi	
2019	Unda	
2019	Madhura Raja	
2019	Peranbu	
2018	Oru Kuttanadan Blog	
2018	Abrahaminte Santhathikal	
2018	Uncle	
2018	Parole	
2018	Captain	
2018	Street Lights	
2017	Masterpiece	
2017	Pullikkaran Staraa	
2017	Puthan Panam	
2017	The Great Father	
2016	Thoppil Joppan	
2016	White	
2016	Kasaba	
2016	Puthiya Niyamam	
2015	Pathemari	
2015	Utopiayile Rajavu	
2015	Acha Dhin	
2015	Bhaskar the Rascal	
2015	Fireman	
2014	Varsham	
2014	RajadhiRaja	
2014	Munnariyippu	
2014	Manglish	
2014	Gangster	
2014	Praise the Lord	
2014	Balyakalasakhi	
2013	Silence	
2013	Daivathinte Swantham Cleetus	
2013	Kunjananthante Kada	
2013	Kadal Kadannoru Mathukkutty	
2013	Immanuel	
2013	Proprietors: Kammath & Kammath	
2012	Bavuttiyude Namathil	
2012	Face2Face	
2012	Jawan of Vellimala	
2012	Thappana	
2012	Cobra	
2012	The King & the Commissioner	
2012	Shikari	
2011	Venicile Vyapari	
2011	Bombay March 12	
2011	The Train	
2011	Doubles	
2011	August 15	
2010	Best Actor	
2010	Best of Luck	
2010	Vandae Maatharam	
2010	Pranchiyettan & the Saint	
2010	Kutty Srank	
2010	Pokkiri Raja	
2010	Pramaani	
2010	Yugapurushan	
2010	Drona 2010	
2009	Chattambinaadu	
2009	Paleri Manikyam: Oru Pathirakolapathakathinte Katha	Winner of Kerala State Film Award for Best Makeup Artist. He shared the award with Rathish Ambaady.
2009	Kerala Cafe	
2009	Pazhassi Raja	
2009	Loudspeaker	
2009	Daddy Cool	
2009	Ee Pattanathil Bhootham	
2009	Love In Singapore	
2008	Twenty:20	
2008	Mayabazar	
2008	One Way Ticket	
2008	Parunthu	
2008	Annan Thambi	
2008	Roudram	
2007	Katha Parayumbol	
2007	Nazrani	
2007	Ore Kadal	
2007	Mission 90 Days	
2007	Big B	
2007	Mayavi	
2007	Kaiyoppu|	
2006	Palunku	
2006	Karutha Pakshikal	Winner of Critics Award
2006	Pothen Vava	
2006	Bhargava Charitham Moonam Khandam	
2006	Prajapathi	
2006	Balram vs. Tharadas	
2006	Thuruppu Gulan	
2005	Bus Conductor	
2005	Rajamanikyam	
2005	Nerariyan CBI	
2005	Rappakal	
2005	Thaskara Veeran	
2005	Thommanum Makkalum	
2004	Vesham	
2004	Black	
2004	Kaazhcha	
2004	Aparichithan	
2004	Vajram	
2004	Sethurama Iyer CBI	
2003	Pattalam	
2003	Chronic Bachelor	
2002	Dany	
2002	Kai Ethum Doorathu	
2002	Phantom	
2001	Dubai	
2001	Rakshasa Rajav	
2000	Dada Sahib	
2000	Valliettan	
2000	Narasimham	
2000	Arayannagalude Veedu	
1999	Pallavur Devanarayanan	
1999	Prem Poojari	
1999	Ezhupunna Tharakan	
1999	Thachiledathu Chundan	
1999	Megham	
1999	Stalin Sivadas	
1999	The Godman	
1998	Elavamkodu Desam	
1998	Harikrishnans	
1998	Sidhartha	
1998	Oru Maravathoor Kanavu	
1998	The Truth	
1997	Bhoothakkannadi	
1997	Vamsam	
1997	Kaliyoonjal	
1997	Oral Mathram	
1996	Udhyanapalakan	
1996	Indraprastham	
1996	Aayiram Naavulla Ananthan	
1996	Hitler	
1996	Azhakiya Ravanan	
1995	The King	
1995	Ormakal Undayirikkanam	
1995	No. 1 Snehatheeram Bangalore North	
1995	Oru Abhibhashakante Case Diary	
1995	Mazhayethum Munpe	
1994	Sukrutham	
1994	Sainyam	
1994	Sagaram Sakshi	
1994	Vishnu	
1994	Ponthan Mada	
1994	Vidheyan	
1993	Golanthara Vartha	
1993	Padheyam	
1993	Sarovaram	
1993	Jackpot	
1993	Vatsalyam	
1993	Aayirappara	
1993	Dhruvam	
1992	Pappayude Swantham Appoos	
1992	Kizhakkan Pathrose	
1992	Mahanagaram	
1992	Johnnie Walker	
1992	Soorya Manasam	
1992	Kauravar	Debut as independent makeup man
1991	Neelagiri	Debut as assistant makeup man
