= Immanuel (film) =

- Official Poster
- Directed by: Lal Jose
- Written by: A.C. Vijeesh
- Produced by: S. George
- Starring: Mammooty; Fahadh Faasil; Reenu Mathews; Salim Kumar; Guinness Pakru
- Cinematography: Pradeep Nair
- Edited by: Ranjan Abraham
- Music by: Afzal Yusuf
- Production company: Cyn-Cyl Celluloid
- Distributed by: Play House & Tricolor Entertainment
- Release date: 5 April 2013
- Country: India
- Language: Malayalam
- Budget: ₹3 crore
- Box office: ₹11 crore

Immanuel, also publicized as Emmanuel, is a 2013 Malayalam comedy-drama film, directed by Lal Jose and produced by S. George. The film stars Mammootty in the title role with Fahadh Faasil and Reenu Mathews. Lal Jose has stated that it is a "soft film sans hullabaloo" and "essentially tells the story of Immanuel's intrinsic goodness even in the face of adversity."

== Synopsis ==
The film follows the character of Immanuel who works in a book publishing firm owned by Joseph. When the company is closed down due to unexpected reasons, Immanuel and his family find it difficult to make both ends meet. He then gets a job in a private insurance company which is managed by Jeevan Raj. The movie gives an unvarnished portrayal of the ruthless ways in which private insurance companies work, with scant regard for humanity. Immanuel is cheated by his colleague, Venkatesh, who grabs his customer and takes the credit. Non-performers are forced to leave the organization without prior notice. The clients are repeatedly denied their claims on flimsy grounds while the company makes a profit. The film portrays the battle between the ruthless company and Immanuel who tries to set things right for the customers.

== Cast ==
- Mammootty as Immanuel
- Fahadh Faasil as Jeevan Raj
- Reenu Mathews as Annie
- Gouri Shankar as Robin
- Salim Kumar as Suku (Peon)
- Guinness Pakru as Kannadi Kavi Shivan
- Sunil Sukhada as Joseph
- Ramesh Pisharody as Venkatesh
- P. Balachandran as Gopinathan Nair
- Bijukuttan as Driver
- Abu Salim as Chandy
- Shivaji Guruvayoor as Simon
- Balachandran Chullikkadu as Madhavettan
- Nedumudi Venu as Jabbar
- Anil Murali (cameo) as Velayuthan
- Nandu as Dr. Ramakrishnan
- Mukesh (cameo) as Rajasekharan
- Devan (cameo) as Kuwait Kumaran
- Suja Menon as Saritha
- Sukumari as Khadeejumma
- Ponnamma Babu s Chandy's wife
- Devi Ajith as Sandy Wilson
- T Parvathy
- Muktha (cameo) as Jenniffer
- Deepika Mohan as Immanuel's co-worker at DTP Center
- Anjana Appukuttan as Immanuel's neighbour

== Production ==
The casting for Immanuel began in mid-2012, with both John Abraham and Balachandra Menon rumored to be taking part in the film. Jose denied rumors that Abraham would be acting in the film and Menon also denied that he would perform due to conflicting schedules with his personal life. Actor Mammootty was confirmed as the lead actor, with Fahadh Faasil also performing in the film. Fahadh was initially said to be performing a "negative role" in Immanuel, which Jose later stated untrue and that Fahadh would be portraying a company executive. In early January 2013, Jose announced that he had cast, a newcomer, Reenu Mathews, as Mammootty's wife in the film.

The filming began in Kochi in January 2013.

== Release ==
The film was released on 5 April 2013.

=== Critical reception ===
Smitha of OneIndia gave the movie 4/5 stars and stated, "Immanuel is a touching, heartwarming and poignant tale of human values, endurance and goodness in people" and that the movie "is worth watching this weekend and seems to have all ingredients that might make it a superhit."

Aswin J Kumar of The Times of India gave the movie 3/5 stars, and said that "Immanuel is the latest embodiment among the newly developed breed of characters who absorb all pain, rage and agony with an enduring smile," but stated that "the problem with Immanuel is that whatever he (Immanuel) does in the film looks more divine than human."

Now running.com rated Immanuel above average. Veeyen said that "'Emmanuel' is a film that talks of the trying times that we live in. It's a delicate film with modest intentions, but which nevertheless remains a miniature gem with a distinct shine. He also praised the performance of mammooty. 'Mammootty is incredibly good as Emmanuel' Veeyen wrote."

=== Box office ===
The film was a commercial success. The film ran for 125 days in theatres.

== Soundtrack ==
The film's soundtrack contains four songs composed by Afsal Yusuf, and the lyrics by Rafeeq Ahamed and N. M. Shyam.

#	Title	Singer(s)
1	"Ennodu Koode"	Jayaram Ranjith Divya S. Menon
2	"Maanathudichathu"	Najim Arshad, Saptaparna Chakraborty
3	"Paathakal (D)"	Reshma Menon, Carl Franais
4	"Paathakal"	Carl Franais, Ajeesh Ashokan
