= Bhramanam =

Indian television series

- ഭ്രമണം
- Genre: Drama
- Created by: CTV companies
- Based on: Bhramanam by Joyce
- Developed by: Joyce
- Written by: Joyce
- Directed by: Binu Vellathooval
- Creative director: Ajith
- Starring: Mukundan
- Theme music composer: Saanand George
- Composer: Background Score: Sanand George
- Country of origin: India
- Original language: Malayalam
- No. of episodes: 450

Production
- Executive producers: Biju Thottummkal; Vikraman Namboothiri; Thomas Thalanad; C.S.Emmanuel
- Producer: Joycy
- Cinematography: Prateesh Nenmarra
- Editor: Ajith Prasanan
- Camera setup: Multi-camera
- Running time: 20 minutes
- Production company: Sree movies

Original release
- Network: Mazhavil Manorama
- Release: 12 February 2018 – 8 November 2019

Related
- Nokkethadhoorathu; Sthreepadham

Bhramanam is an Indian Malayalam television series written by novelist Joycee which is an adaptation of his novel of the same name on Malayala Manorama. The show depicted the story of Anitha and her struggles to protect her children from the dangers of the 21st century. 'Bhramanam' was a megahit thriller serial when its running on television gained high TRP rating and millions of viewers on YouTube and manoramaMAX.

The show premiered on Mazhavil Manorama on 12 February 2018. The show stars Mukundan and Lavanya Nair. The show aired its last episode on 8 November 2019. Episodes of the show can be viewed on Manorama Max and Mazhavil Manorama YouTube channels. Initially, the show had telecasted at 8 pm slot on Mazhavil Manorama and later was shifted to 7 pm until its climax. Bhramanam gained high TRP ratings on television and was noted for its varied and realistic depiction of a Malayalee family.

== Plot ==
The show is a family drama. Harilal, a bank employee working at Bank of Baroda in Delhi and Anitha, a nurse working at AIIMS, Delhi are caught in a web of love and are happily married and blessed with two daughters whom they named Haritha and Neetha. Over time, the couple encounters challenges in their union, leading to their divorce. Their daughters stay with their father, who assumes their care. Harilal was on the verge of marrying a journalist, but she died in a scooter accident, leaving behind a single daughter. Harilal then turned to Anitha for assistance in caring for his late fiancée's daughter.

Sixteen years after their divorce, Anitha is back with her family. Anitha starts to feel strongly endeared toward her daughters and she must decide whether to rejoin her family and continue living a happy life together. Anitha makes ever new and better plans to protect her children from the dangers that befall them.

Haritha marries Sarath, son of Rajeev due to family pressure. Gradually Haritha feels affectionate towards her husband and becomes pregnant.On the other hand, Nertha is expelled from the college and even attempts suicide, but fails due to Anitha's timely movement. Actually, Hatitha was pregnant with Ravi's child and except Anitha everyone was unaware of it. Ravi often threatened Haritha and family and threatened to reveal the truth about Haritha's pregnancy to Sarath's Family. The sex racket took revenge on Neetha as they had lost a big business deal due to her. Harilal's family was often attacked by the pimps appointed by the rich sex dealers. Haritha and Neetha also feel endeared to Anitha without knowing that she is their mother. Anitha has now murdered the people who harmed the life of Neetha and Haritha. Anitha had been sentenced to prison by the court for the crime of burning the Pavizham pavilion with its owners. Finally, Harilal had to reveal the truth that Anitha was her wife.

Anitha shared video clips to several WhatsApp groups exposing the sexual harassment she had faced in the cruel hands of Shyam and his gang. By the time Neetha had already exposed the mask of morality worn by certain individuals before the media. She spoke about the hardships she and her family had to overcome because of these two-faced people. Neetha and her family help the society realise Anitha's brave movement for saving her kid's life and how officials denied justice for a common man's attempt to save his daughter in interest of big business tycoons.

Anitha gets rid of the Ravi Shankar case as the court agreed to the statement that she shot Ravi in self-defence to protect herself from Ravi's rape attempt. Even though Harilal and his family were ready to move for a bail appeal for Anitha, she declared to the court that the Pavizham pavilion killing was her own strategy. Harilal adopts Yadhu as per the request made by Anitha. Yadhu was Anitha's own child, a blessing of her relationship with Ramkumar Yadav. Yadhu enters Harilal's life. Harilal and their family begin a new chapter in their life. Anitha hopes to have a life with her family behind jail bars. Yadhu soon adapted to Harilal's family environment and became more attached to Neetha. Harilal's mother was surprised when he gifted a bicycle to Yadhu, making him more happy. In the end, Harilal happily watches his family enjoying the garden and soon the camera zooms out while he observes the sky dreaming of something.

== Cast ==
- Mukundan as Harilal
  - Sajin John as Young Harilal
  - Aparna Ramesh as Young Anita Thomas
- Binny George as Maria
- Win Sagar as John Samuel
- Swathy Nithyanand as Haritha: Hari's elder daughter, Neetha's elder sister, daughter-in-law of Rajeev and Indumathi, Sarath's wife, Ajith's sister-in-law
  - Veda Nanda as Young Haritha
- Nandana Anand/ Anjusha as Neetha: Hari's younger daughter, Haritha's younger sister
- Roslin as Vimala Kumari: Hari's mother, grandmother of Neetha and Haritha
- Karthika Kannan as Deepa Jyoti: Hari's elder sister; aunt of Haritha and Neetha
- Aswathy as Dhanya: Deepa's daughter; cousin of Haritha and Neetha
- Sabu Varghese as Rajeev Menon: Harilal's friend; Haritha's father-in-law; father of Sharath and Ajith; Indumathi's husband
- Adaaidha as Indumathi: Rajeev's wife; Haritha's mother-in-law; mother of Sharath and Ajith
- Maneesh Krishna as Sharath: Haritha's husband; Rajeev's and Indumathi's elder son; Ajith's younger brother
- Sreehari Thottunkal as Ajith: Rajeev and Indumathi's younger son; Sarath's younger brother; Haritha's brother-in-law
- Uma Nair as Bindhuja Nair: Hari's late fiancé
- Sona/Sreelakshmi as Nivyamol: Bindhuja's daughter
- Sarath Das as Ravi Shankar: Haritha's lover; Anupama's ex-husband; father of Haritha's baby
- Sangeetha Rajendran as Anupama: Ravi's ex-wife
- Pinkymol, daughter of Ravi and Anu
- Akash, younger son of Ravi and Anupama
- Priya Vishnu as Lakshmi: Anu's housemaid
- Prajusha as Susheela: Harilal's housemaid
- Nincy Xavier/ Thejal as Anjitha Menon: Neetha's college mate
- Raji P Menon as Sr. Nirmala: Manager, Nirmala Sadanam
- Santhosh Krishna as C.I. Sethunath
- Jishin Mohan as Shyam Lal
- Ajoobsha as Jishin: Neetha's ex-lover; a pimp
- Kalesh Kakode as Dheeraj: Jishin's friend; a pimp
- Pinky Kannan as a College student
- Prasad Shornur as Benny
- Roy as CI Haridasan
- Kishore as DYSP Somasundaram
- Anooy Krishnan as young Hari's roommate
- Rajeev Pala
- Roy as Police as Circle Inspector CR Ganesh Kumar
