= Irattai Roja =

- Poster
- Directed by: Keyaar
- Screenplay by: Keyaar
- Story by: Bhoopathi Raja
- Produced by: K. C. Sekar Babu
- Starring: Ramki; Urvashi; Khushbu
- Cinematography: J. A. Robert
- Edited by: S. Ramesh
- Music by: Ilaiyaraaja
- Production company: Devi Kamal Films
- Release date: 5 April 1996
- Running time: 127 minutes
- Country: India
- Language: Tamil

Irattai Roja (transl. Two Roses) is a 1996 Indian Tamil-language film directed by Keyaar. The film stars Ramki, Urvashi, and Khushbu. It is a remake of the 1994 Telugu film Subhalagnam which was based on the American film Indecent Proposal (1993). The film was released on 5 April 1996.

== Plot ==
Uma marries Balu, an honest civil engineer. Uma thinks that he is rich and receives a lot of bribes but it turns out, Balu is from a middle-class family like her. Uma is a miser and dreams of becoming rich. A few years later, they have two children. In the meantime, Priya, the daughter of Balu's boss Rajasekhar, falls in love with Balu and asks him to marry her unaware of Balu's marriage and his two children. Balu refuses to marry her as he was already married but she compels him. When Priya meets Uma, she offers her one crore rupees in exchange for marrying Balu. Uma immediately agrees and she starts forcing Balu into remarriage. Finally, Balu agrees with a heavy heart as Uma threatens to commit suicide. Soon, Balu also starts falling in love with Priya. Uma slowly realizes her mistake and wants to get Balu back. The rest of the story is what happens to Balu, Uma and Priya.

== Cast ==
- Ramki as Balu
- Urvashi as Uma
- Khushbu as Priya
- Suhasini Maniratnam as Geetha
- Srividya as Lawyer
- Vennira Aadai Moorthy as Uma's father
- Kavitha as Uma's mother
- Rajasekhar as Rajasekhar, Priya's father
- Chinni Jayanth
- Pandu
- Thyagu
- Anuja
- Shakeela
- Sharmili as Girija
- M. R. Krishnamurthy
- Oru Viral Krishna Rao as Doctor
- Junior Balaiah
- Swaminathan
- Disco Shanti
- Ajay Rathnam
- Baby Sridevi as Sumathi
- Master Prabhu
- Visu as an anchor (Guest appearance)

== Soundtrack ==
The soundtrack was composed by Ilaiyaraaja, with lyrics written by Vaali.

Song	Singer(s)
"Ada Enna Samsaram"	Mano, Devie Neithiyar
"Arasana Nambi"	Malaysia Vasudevan, K. S. Chithra
"Pombalainga Kaiye"	Ilaiyaraaja, Arunmozhi
"Siruvaani Aathu"	K. S. Chithra, Mano
"Unnai Padatha"	S. P. Balasubrahmanyam
"Unnai Vidamaaten"	Bhavatharini, Mano

== Reception ==
The Hindu wrote "That Mammon alone will not bring happiness is focused in Devikamal Films' Rettai Roja, a film in a light vein with touches of sentiment. The nucleus of this adult theme is based on Indecent Proposal, with a rich young lady buying the husband of a greedy woman and marrying him, while the wife slowly feels the pinches of acquired wealth, repents for her mistakes and regains her husband. This out of the way theme in a country where women are worshipped for their virtues is dealt with by director Kayar (A. Kothandaramaiah) without hurting the image of the distaff side." Khushbu won the Cinema Express Award for Best Actress – Tamil.
