= Sapthamashree Thaskaraha =

- Theatrical release poster
- Directed by: Anil Radhakrishnan Menon
- Written by: Anil Radhakrishnan Menon
- Produced by: Santosh Sivan; Shaji Nadesan; Prithviraj Sukumaran
- Starring: Prithviraj Sukumaran; Asif Ali; Nedumudi Venu; Chemban Vinod Jose; Joy Mathew; Neeraj Madhav; Reenu Mathews; Sanusha; Sudheer Karamana; Anu Joseph; Lijo Jose Pellissery
- Cinematography: Jayesh Nair
- Edited by: Manoj Kannoth
- Music by: Songs: Rex Vijayan; Background Score: Sushin Shyam
- Production company: August Cinema
- Distributed by: August Cinema
- Release date: 6 September 2014
- Running time: 142 minutes
- Country: India
- Language: Malayalam
- Box office: est. ₹197 million

Sapthamashree Thaskaraha (transl. Seven Good Thieves) is a 2014 Malayalam-language heist comedy film directed and written by Anil Radhakrishnan Menon. The film features an ensemble cast of Prithviraj Sukumaran, Asif Ali, Nedumudi Venu, Chemban Vinod Jose, Joy Mathew, Neeraj Madhav, Salam Bukhari, Reenu Mathews, Sanusha, Joy Mathew, Mukundan, Irshad and Flower Battsetseg. The film is produced by Prithviraj, Santosh Sivan and Shaji Nadesan under August Cinema. Sapthamashree Thaskaraha has cinematography by Jayesh Nair and music composed by Rex Vijayan. The film released on 6 September 2014 to positive reviews. It led in the box office collections among the Onam releases and was deemed a blockbuster. The film became the second highest grossing Malayalam movie of 2014, behind Bangalore Days.

== Plot ==
The film is set in Thrissur and starts off with Martin, a famous thief in Koorkancheri, confessing to a priest in a church (St Francis Xavier Church Karanchira), explaining his past. Martin gets arrested for stealing from a Hindu temple, while his accomplice Geevarghese escapes. He is sent to Central Prison Viyyoor near Viyyoor and meets 6 other people who had been arrested in: Narayankutty, an electronic shop owner arrested for giving a hidden camera in a soap box to 2 people, who used them in a hotel bathroom; Nobelettan, a rich, humble and famous businessman, Who is the founder and managing director of a chit fund company, cheated by Pius Matthew, a local politician and councillor, and his younger brother, Christo, which cost his son's life; Shabbab who beats up his visa provider who had busted him in a jail at Dubai for 10 months; Vasu aka Leaf Vasu, the former hitman of Pius, after a crowbar fell on his head he suffered a mental disorder; Salam, a circus magician, arrested for beating up some irritating audience; and Krishnanunni, a bank employee, whose wife Sarah was killed in a car accident after she was harassed and body shamed by Pius, who had abused her after she got cheated. After they were released, the seven of them planned to steal money from a safe in the charity hospital where Pius and his brothers had kept their money.

After they were released, they sought the help of Annamma, Nobelettan's daughter and a nurse at Pius' hospital, for installing spy cameras which was made by Narayankutty there. After finding the exact location of the safe, Krishnanunni found out that the safe can be only unlocked with 3 keys through the safe blueprint, each of them with Pius, Christo and Franko. For that, the gang planned of making a duplicate of those 3 keys by imprinting the keys onto a soap piece. They found out that Christo had kept his key in a glass cabinet, Pius carried the key on a chain, and Franko had it in his car.

After successfully distracting them and getting the key imprints, Krishnanunni planned to do the heist during a festival. That night, he told Leaf Vasu to put fireworks in the sewage tank of the charity hospital, which gave them access to the back of the hospital. He told Annamma to cut off the main supply so that they could get access to the room where the safe is, through the exhaust fan. After successfully getting to the room, they unlocked the safe. What they didn't know was the safe was connected to an alarm, which alerted the three of them. They chased the sewage trucks where they had put the money, but failing. The gang meet up on the side of the road, but Krishnanunni is missing. It is revealed that Krishnanunni had gone off with the money.

The story comes back to the present, where Martin was explaining his story to the priest. He explained that the gang had searched for Krishnanunni, but they were surprised to see another person with the same name. After some days, each of them from the gang got a box with solar panels on the top. When they opened it, they found the money given as a share by Krishnanunni for the heist, later crying in joy. Then it is revealed that the Krishnanunni who helped them in the heist was actually a con man. He is then shown in Trivandrum, having taken a new identity, completely different from his Krishnanunni one. He prepares to sell solar panels to a group of politicians and businessmen, thus beginning a newer, larger con.

== Cast ==
- Prithviraj Sukumaran as Krishnanunni (fake) / Unnamed Con Man
- Asif Ali as Shabab
- Reenu Mathews as Sarah, Krishnanunni's wife
- Nedumudi Venu as Noble Ettan
- Chemban Vinod Jose as Martin
- Joy Mathew as Pius Mathew
- Neeraj Madhav as Narayankutty
- Salam Bukhari as Salam
- Sanusha as Annamma
- Sudheer Karamana as Leaf Vasu
- Mukundan as Franco Mathew
- Irshad as Christo Mathew
- Anu Joseph as Nancy Mathew
- Lijo Jose Pellissery as Priest
- Shivaji Guruvayoor as Xavier
- Hareesh Perumanna as thief
- Pradeep as thief
- Sudhi Koppa as Geevarghese
- Rema Devi as Sarah's mother
- Indrajith Sukumaran as the real Krishnanunni (Cameo appearance)
- Veena as Chinnamma
- Shobha Singh as Rosey
- Gokulan as Locksmith
- Lishoy as Superintendent Alexander
- Vijayan Peringod as Vydhyarettan
- Amith Chakalakkal as Nobel's son
- Sudharaman as Cleetus's helper
- Francis as Franko's Helper
- Raj Kalesh as Circus Announcer
- Eswar Iyer as Sarah's father
- Ranjitha as office lady
- Lukman Avaran as a hotel boy
- Thanseer as sexton
- Balan Thrissur as Jayan, Security officer
- Anil Nedumangad as Babu
- Ambili as Babu's wife
- Nimisha Thilakan as Channel reporter
- Rebecca Santhosh (uncredited role)

== Production ==
Nyla Usha was earlier roped in to play the female lead but due to certain date issues, she was replaced by Reenu Mathews, who was reported to "shed her simple housewife image" in this film. Anil had reworked on the script, due to which Sreenath Bhasi was replaced by Neeraj Madhav. A Mongolian circus artiste, Flower Battsetseg, was signed to play a pivotal role in the film. Sanusha stated that she played a nurse called Annamma in the film, which she was a bold and mature role, for which she would be sporting a no makeup look.

== Music ==
The songs of the film was composed by Rex Vijayan and the film score was composed by Sushin Shyam who marked his debut as a film composer.

Sapthamashree Thaskaraha

Soundtrack album by Rex Vijayan
- Released: 26 August 2014
- Genre: Film soundtrack
- Length: 16:56
- Language: Malayalam
- Label: Muzik 247
- Producer: Rex Vijayan

Rex Vijayan chronology
North 24 Kaatham (2013)	Sapthamashree Thaskaraha (2014)	Lord Livingstone 7000 Kandi (2015)

Sapthamashree Thaskaraha – Original motion picture soundtrack
No.	Title	Lyrics	Singer(s)	Length
1.	"Kayethum Doorathu"	Vinayak Sasikumar	Sushin Shyam	3:51
2.	"Naam Onnayi"	Engandiyoor Chandrasekharan	Saju Sreenivas	4:09
3.	"Sapthamashree Thaskaraha"	Vinayak Sasikumar	Suchith Suresan	4:52
4.	"Thaane Pookkum"	Engandiyoor Chandrasekharan	Job Kurian, Saptaparna Chakraborty	4:04
Total length:				16:56

== Critical reception ==
The Times of India gave a rating of 7.5/10, and stated "This is one film that is not going to disappoint for there is an energy that is infectious."
