= Madam Chief Minister =

2021 political drama film by Subhash Kapoor

- Theatrical release poster
- Directed by: Subhash Kapoor
- Written by: Subhash Kapoor
- Produced by: Bhushan Kumar; Krishan Kumar; Naren Kumar; Dimple Kharbanda
- Starring: Richa Chadda; Manav Kaul
- Cinematography: Jayesh Nair
- Edited by: Chandrashekhar Prajapati
- Music by: Mangesh Dhakde
- Production companies: T-Series Films; Kangra Talkies
- Distributed by: AA Films
- Release date: 22 January 2021
- Running time: 122 minutes
- Country: India
- Language: Hindi
- Box office: est. ₹0.5 million

Madam Chief Minister is a 2021 Indian Hindi-language political drama film directed by Subhash Kapoor. The film stars Richa Chadda in the lead role. The film's official announcement was made by Chadda on 12 February 2020. The film was shot in Lucknow all through November and December 2019 in a start-to-finish 40-day schedule. The film was theatrically released on 2 January 2021.

== Plot ==
The movie Madam Chief Minister tells the story of Tara, a young woman from a lower caste who dreams of making a difference in her community. She was betrayed and left by her political boyfriend Indu when she was pregnant with his child. She joins a political party and works her way up through the ranks, eventually becoming a trusted aide to a senior leader. Despite her intelligence and hard work, Tara faces discrimination and prejudice from those around her, who view her caste as a barrier to success.

Despite the challenges, Tara is undeterred, and when the opportunity arises, she seizes it with both hands. She stands for elections in her constituency and wins, becoming the youngest Chief minister in the state's history. However, her ascent to power is not without its challenges. She faces opposition from within her own party, from other political parties, and the media. She also faces personal challenges, including her relationship with her boyfriend, who is from a higher caste.

The film explores the complexities and contradictions of Indian politics, including the pervasive influence of caste and the rampant corruption that is often a feature of political life. It also highlights the struggles of women in positions of power, who must navigate a male-dominated world and overcome entrenched biases and discrimination.

== Cast ==
- Richa Chadda as Chief Minister Tara Roopram Khan: Danish's wife and Indramani's former girlfriend
- Manav Kaul as Danish Rehman Khan: Tara's husband and Shashi's fiancé
- Akshay Oberoi as Indramani "Indu" Tripathi: Tara's former boyfriend and enemy who left her and used her when she was twice been pregnant by his child.
- Saurabh Shukla as Master Surajbhan
- Subhrajyoti Barat as Arvind Singh
- Nikhil Vijay as Bablu
- Boloram Das as Sundar
- Sangam Bahuguna as Khushwaha
- Shreya Awasthi as Dr. Laxmi
- Raviza Chauhan as Shashi Rai / Shazia Ahmed, Danish's fiancée
- Sushil Shukla as Ansari
- Vivek Yadav as Student 1
- Raj Vardhan Pandey as Killer

== Music ==
The film's music was composed by Mangesh Dhakde, while lyrics were written by Dushyant.

Track listing
No.	Title	Singer(s)	Length
1.	"Chidi Chidi"	Swanand Kirkire	2:15

== Reception ==
On the review aggregator website Rotten Tomatoes, 40% of 5 critics' reviews are positive, with an average rating of 4.3/10.

The film received three stars out of five from The Times of India's Ronak Kotecha and wrote, "Madam Chief Minister gets our vote for being an entertaining political drama, set in the crime-infested corridors of power."

== Controversy ==
The movie's portrayal of the lead was criticized for not choosing a Dalit woman. The actor responded, “Regrettable and a completely unintentional oversight”.

== See also ==
- Maharani (web series)
