= Lord Livingstone 7000 Kandi =

- Theatrical release poster
- Directed by: Anil Radhakrishnan Menon
- Screenplay by: Anil Radhakrishnan Menon
- Produced by: Prem Menon
- Starring: Kunchacko Boban; Bharath; Sunny Wayne; Reenu Mathews; Nedumudi Venu; Chemban Vinod Jose; Jacob Gregory; Sudheer Karamana; Priya Lal; Assim Jamal
- Cinematography: Jayesh Nair
- Edited by: Manoj Kannoth
- Music by: Songs: Rex Vijayan; Background Score: Sushin Shyam
- Production company: Global United Media
- Distributed by: Century Films
- Release date: 16 October 2015 (India)
- Running time: 134 minutes
- Country: India
- Language: Malayalam

Lord Livingstone 7000 Kandi is a 2015 Indian Malayalam-language fantasy-adventure written and directed by Anil Radhakrishnan Menon. It features an ensemble cast, including Kunchacko Boban, Bharath, Sunny Wayne, Nedumudi Venu, Chemban Vinod, Reenu Mathews, Jacob Gregory, and Sudheer Karamana. The film was produced by Prem Menon under Global United Media. The music was composed by Rex Vijayan, while the background score was by Sushin Shyam. The film was released on 16 October 2015.

== Plot ==
Philipose John Varkey, a nature enthusiast, sends letters to 100 people to save an unknown tribal village called "7000 Kandi". Various people came, and some returned as they realised the village was haunted. But six people (Shanumgan Ilangovan, Madhumita Krishnan, C. K. A. K. Menon, Beeran, Prof. N. Neelakandan, and Ananthakrishnan Iyer) came to the village with the help of Malavedan. Philipose informs them about a treaty between a landlord and the Livingston company 150 years ago. As per the treaty, the company is authorized to make the forest an industrial area or a plantation for the next 150 years. If they fail, the forest goes to the government of India. If they succeed in the mission, they can extend the validity to 350 more years. Now, the company has become aware of some rare earth minerals there and want to explore them. Hence, they appoint the Bangalore brothers to cut down the trees. Philipose convinces others about the importance of saving 7000 Kandi and the tribe who were mistaken as ghosts by the natives. With the help of six members, Philipose and the tribals try to stop the Bangalore brothers. They succeeded in the mission and the Bangalore brothers left the place intact. Later, it is revealed that the treaty is valid for four months too and the mission was now to hand it over to an international firm and the tribals should fight with the company to live on their own land. The film ends with Philipose, the tribals, and the six battling the company.

== Cast ==
- Kunchako Boban as Philipose John Varkey, nature enthusiast
- Bharath as Shanumugan Ilangovan aka Sam, adventurer
- Sunny Wayne as Beeran, street magician
- Reenu Mathews as Madhumita Krishnan aka Madhu, gun-testing expert
- Nedumudi Venu as C. K. A. K. Menon, Retired Defence Secretary
- Chemban Vinod Jose as Prof. N. Neelakandan, Veterinary Professor
- Jacob Gregory as Ananthakrishnan Iyer, chemical engineer
- Sudheer Karamana as Malavedan, guide
- Mukundan as Leader of tribes
- Assim Jamal as Bangalore Brothers
- Priya Lal as Meenkanni (Queen of the tribes)
- Salaam Bukhari as contractor
- Divyadarshan as The tribal Engineer
- Raj Kalesh as Kariyan
- Sudhi Koppa as Kakapool
- Praveen Parameswar as tribal saint
- Pushpa Mathews as Ponni
- Ambika Rao as Guguthai
- Prem Menon as Madhu's Senior Officer
- Dinesh Panicker as Ananthu's father-in-law
- Vijayan Peringode as Chikanja
- Shamsudheen Cherpulassery as himself (street magician)
- Subish Sudhi as tribal man
- Nebish Benson

== Production ==
This is the third film of Anil after his much-acclaimed films North 24 Kaatham (2013) and Sapthamashree Thaskaraha (2014). After telling the story of seven thieves in Sapthamashree Thaskaraha, eight individuals become the key people in Lord Livingstone 7000 Kandi. The poster shows the main eight characters in never-seen looks before. According to actor Bharath, who had completed 15 days of shoot, in an interview to The Times of India, "The subject touches upon the fight against deforestation and is scripted so well. Everything is unique about the film, be it the title, the narration or the action scenes".

According to the director, the film deals with a fantasy subject - a story that may or may not happen at any period of time. The shooting commenced on 2 May 2015 at Wayanad, Kerala. The film was set and shot at Wayanad, Idukki, Pune and Chennai. The official trailer was released on 2 October.

== Music ==
Lord Livingstone 7000 Kandi

Soundtrack album by Rex Vijayan
- Released: 2 October 2014
- Genre: Film soundtrack
- Language: Malayalam
- Label: Manorama Music
- Producer: Rex Vijayan

Rex Vijayan chronology
Sapthamashree Thaskaraha (2013)	Lord Livingstone 7000 Kandi (2014)	Parava (2017)

Rex Vijayan provides music for the film with background music by Sushin Shyam. The album consists of four songs composed by Rex Vijayan. The soundtrack album was released on 2 October at Kochi.

No.	Title	Singer(s)	Length
1.	"Aayiram Kaalamai"	Gowri Lakshmi, Maqbool Mohammed	3:54
2.	"Tharangal Padunne"	Rex Vijayan	4:14
3.	"Kunni Mani"	Suchith Suresan	3:54
4.	"Dheera Charitha"	Job Kurian	3:42

== Box office ==
The film grossed ₹1.22 crore (US$130,000) in two days from Kerala.
