= Aanpirannol =

2021 Indian television series

- Also known as: Aanpirannol- Avalude Kadha Avanteyum
- Screenplay by: Ganesh Oolikkara
- Story by: Ganga
- Directed by: Siva Mohan Thampi
- Creative director: Vishnu U.B
- Starring: Riya Kuriyakose
- Theme music composer: Balagopal R
- Opening theme: "Kannale Parayuvathivaloru"
- Composer: Radhakrishnan
- Country of origin: India
- Original language: Malayalam
- No. of seasons: 1
- No. of episodes: 522

Production
- Producer: Codex Media
- Cinematography: Jose Alleppy
- Editor: Pramod Nenmara
- Production company: Codex Media

Original release
- Network: Amrita TV
- Release: 1 November 2021 – 10 November 2023

Aanpirannol is an Indian Malayalam-language television series directed by Siva Mohan Thampi. The show premiered on 1 November 2021 on Amrita TV. It stars Riya Kuriyakose in the title role along with Parvathy, Mukundan and Devi Ajith in pivotal roles. It is the first show in the history of Indian television that portrays the life of the transgender community.

== Cast ==
- Riya Kuriyakose as Apoorva / Appu
- Parvathy Iyer as Malavika
- Mukundan as Vijay Panicker
- Devi Ajith
- Krishnachandran
- Vanitha Krishnachandran as Daisy Teacher
- Divya M Nair as Aswathi
- Sanuraj / Ananthu Sheeja as Dr. Jobin Alex
- Rahul SR as Arun
- Resh Lakshna as Dr. Aleena
- Shihab as K Giriprasad IAS
- Ramy Nakshatra

== Production ==
=== Casting ===
Debutant Riya Kuriyakose was cast as the protagonist, Apoorva. Parvathy, Mukundan and Devi Ajith were also cast in pivotal roles.

=== Release ===
The title song video of Aanpirannol was released by Jayasurya in October 2021. The show premiered on Amrita TV on 1 November 2021. It is telecasted daily at the 7:00 p.m. (IST) time slot.

== Soundtrack ==
No.	Title	Lyrics	Music	Singer(s)	Length
1.	"Kannale Parayuvathivaloru"	Sreevasanth S.V	Balagopal R	Lekshmi S Nair	1:29
Total length:					1:29

== Awards and nominations ==
Year	Award	Category	Nominee	Result	Ref.
2025	Kerala State Television Awards	Best Television Series	Aanpirannol	Won	
2025	Kerala State Television Awards	Best Actress	Riya Kuriakose	Won	
2025	Kerala State Television Awards	Best Screenwriter	Ganga	Won	
2025	Kerala State Television Awards	Best Dubbing Artist (Female)	Parvathy S. Prakash	Won	
