= Mukundan (actor) =

Indian film and television actor (born 1969)

Mukundan Menon
- Born: 19 July 1969 (age 57); Ottappalam, Kerala, India
- Citizenship: Indian
- Education: Thrissur School of Drama
- Occupation: Actor
- Years active: 1987 – present
- Spouse: Vidya Lakshmi (m. 2006)
- Children: 2

Mukundan Menon (born 19 July 1969) is an Indian actor who works in film, television, and stage. Mukundan is an alumnus of Thrissur School of Drama.

Mukundan has starred in several hit television projects, including Jwalayayi, Sthree, Pakalmazha and Charulatha which established him as a lead actor in the Malayalam television industry and later started doing films. He was best noted for his performance in the Mazhavil Manorama series Bhramanam.

== Filmography ==
Film

Year	Title	Role	Notes
1994	Sainyam	Cadet Biju	
1994	Ponthan Mada		
1994	Pavithram		
1998	Vismayam	Chandrappan	
2000	Susanna	Thomachan	
2006	Pathaaka	Gouthaman	
2008	College Kumaran	Doctor Kasim Haji	
2009	Evidam Swargamanu	Adv. Issac	
2009	Kerala Cafe	Journalist	Segment: Happy Journey
2010	Pulliman		
2010	Sakudumbam Shyamala		
2011	The Filmstaar		
2012	Poppins		
2013	North 24 Kaatham	Sub-inspector	
2013	White Paper		
2013	Thank You		
2013	Mumbai Police	Captain Sreenivasa Kartha	
2013	Nadan	Babykuttan	
2013	Natholi Oru Cheriya Meenalla	Vasu	
2013	Celluloid		
2014	Sapthamashree Thaskaraha	Franco Mathew	
2014	Law Point	Advocate	
2014	Manglish	Advocate James	
2015	Utopiayile Rajavu	Home Minister	
2015	Nirnayakam	Traffic Police	
2015	Bhaskar the Rascal	Commissioner Manoj Menon	
2015	Ennu Ninte Moideen		
2015	The Reporter	Manoj Puthiyamana	
2015	She Taxi		
2015	Vidooshakan		
2015	Saaradhi		
2015	Rockstar	Abraham/George	
2015	Sir C. P.		
2015	Lord Livingstone 7000 Kandi	Leader of tribes	
2017	Fukri		
2017	Careful	Head Constable Sukumaran	
2017	Thank You Very Much		
2017	The Great Father	Ravi Menon	
2018	Kayamkulam Kochunni		
2018	Krishnam		
2018	Captain		
2018	Abrahaminte Santhathikal	School Principal	
2019	Maarconi Mathaai		Cameo Appearance
2019	Pathinettam Padi	V Joseph	
2022	Oruthee	Hari ASI of Kerala Police	
2023	Live		
2026	Ashakal Aayiram		

== TV serials ==
Partial

Year(s)	Title	Network	Role
2025	Peythozhiyathe	Surya Tv	Balan Mashu
2024	Kadhanayika	Mazhavil Manorama	
2021–2023	Aanpirannol	Amrita TV	Vijay Panicker
2020–2021	Raakuyil	Mazhavil Manorama	Bhaskaran
2018–2019	Bhramanam	Mazhavil Manorama	Harilal
2015-2017	Eeran Nilavu	Flowers (TV channel)	
2012	Sandhyaragam	Amrita TV	
2009	Pakalmazha	Amrita TV	
2008	Devimahatmyam	Asianet	
2008	Vishudha thomasleeha	Asianet	
2007	Swami Ayyappan	Asianet	
2007	Velankani Mathavu	Surya TV	
2006	Kanalpoovu	Kairali TV	
2006	Suryaputhri	Asianet	
2006	Veendum Jwalayayi	DD Malayalam	Ananthan
2005	Swantham Malootty	Surya TV	
2004	Chakkaravava	Surya TV	
2004	Pakalmazha		
2003	Thulasidalam	Surya TV	
2000	Jwalayayi	DD Malayalam	Ananthan
1998-2000	Sthree, Charulatha||Asianet		
1999	Thamarakuzhali	DD Malayalam	Varadarajan
	Pandu Pandu Oru Chekavar	DD Malayalam	
	Gandharva yamamam	Asianet	
