= South Indian Film Chamber of Commerce =

Film association in South India

South Indian Film Chamber of Commerce, abbreviated as SIFCC, is a South Indian film producers, distributors and exhibitors association, headquartered in Chennai, Tamil Nadu, India. It consists of the Telugu Film Chamber of Commerce, Karnataka Film Chamber of Commerce, Kerala Film Chamber of Commerce and the Tamil Nadu Film Chamber of Commerce. The SIFCC was inaugurated in 1939. The current president of the organisation is Ravi Kottarakara. The SIFCC is an active supporter of the Chennai International Film Festival.
