= Nanpakal Nerathu Mayakkam =

2022 Indian film by Lijo Jose Pellissery

- Theatrical release poster
- Directed by: Lijo Jose Pellissery
- Screenplay by: S. Hareesh
- Story by: Lijo Jose Pellissery
- Produced by: Mammootty
- Starring: Mammootty; Ramya Pandian; Ashokan
- Cinematography: Theni Eswar
- Edited by: Deepu S. Joseph
- Production companies: Mammootty Kampany; Amen Movie Monastery (co-producer)
- Distributed by: Wayfarer Films
- Release dates: 12 December 2022 (IFFK); 19 January 2023 (India)
- Running time: 104 minutes
- Country: India
- Languages: Malayalam; Tamil
- Budget: ₹3 crore
- Box office: ₹9.7 crore

Nanpakal Nerathu Mayakkam (English: Like An Afternoon Nap) is a 2022 Indian Malayalam-Tamil bilingual drama film directed by Lijo Jose Pellissery and written by S. Hareesh. It is produced by Mammootty kampany & Amen Movie Monastery. The film stars Mammootty, Ramya Suvi, Ramya Pandian and Ashokan.

Nanpakal Nerathu Mayakkam was released worldwide on 19 January 2023 and received critical acclaim. At the 53rd Kerala State Film Awards, it won two awards, including Best Film (Pellissery and George Sebastian) and Best Actor (Mammootty).

== Plot ==
A bus is bringing back a group of Malayali tourists to Kerala after visiting the Basilica of Our Lady of Good Health in Velankanni, Tamil Nadu. While the other tourists are asleep, tour leader James stops the bus at a remote village in Tamil Nadu. He takes a stroll around the place, enters a house, and starts acting like a member of the family, behaving like a Tamil and speaking in the Tamil language. An old blind woman in the house appears to recognize him as her son, based on his voice and mannerisms. Not finding James, the other tourists come looking for him. His familiarity with the community confuses everyone who travels with him, including the villagers. Eventually, the people realize he has taken on the character, mannerisms, and language of Sundaram, a family member who had disappeared two years earlier. Sundaram's family begins to believe that he has been reincarnated, but James progressively gets confused when people do not accept him as Sundaram. He does not recognize the changes in the village, such as the new temple that had not been built when Sundaram went missing. He also has the chance to see his face in a mirror for the first time when he visits the barber, which shocks him into reality. James' real family and friends plot to sedate him to get him back to Kerala and get him help for his presumed mental disorder. They plan to slip the sedative into his coffee after he wakes up from his afternoon nap. However, after waking up, James regains his true identity and willingly goes with them to board the bus. The ending is open to interpretation. The character named Sundaram and the entire escapade could merely be a dream that James had on the bus.

== Cast ==
- Mammootty as James/Sundaram
- Ramya Suvi as Sally, James' wife
- Ramya Pandian as Kuzhali, Sundaram's wife
- Poo Ramu as Palani, Sundaram's father
- Ashokan as Babukutty
- Devaki as Muth, Sundaram's daughter
- Vipin Atley as Tomy
- Rajesh Sharma as Bus driver
- T. Suresh Babu as James' Father-in-law
- Gireesh Perincheeri as Eeshoppan
- Balan Parakkal as Johny
- G. M. Kumar as Elangovan the Village Head
- Namo Narayana as Kumar, Sundaram's brother
- Ramachandran Durairaj as Shanmugham
- Thomas Panicker as Monayi
- Manoranjan as Jose

== Production ==
On 7 November 2021, Lijo Jose Pellissery officially announced the film by sharing the title through social media. Nanpakal Nerathu Mayakkam is the first-time collaboration between Mammootty and Lijo Jose Pellissery. The film was produced by Mammootty's newly launched production house Mammootty Kampany.

On 7 November 2021, principal photography took place in the village of Manjanaickenpatti, near Palani, Tamil Nadu. Filming was wrapped up on 7 December 2021.

== Release ==
The movie premiered at 27th International Film Festival of Kerala(IIFK) on 12 December 2022. The film received positive reviews and huge demand for world premiere. Audience praised both Mammootty and Lijo Jose Pellissery.

On 19 January 2023, Nanpakal Nerathu Mayakkam went into general release on theatres.

=== Home media ===
The streaming rights of the film were sold to Netflix. It released on 23 February 2023.

== Reception ==
Nanpakal Nerathu Mayakam received mostly positive reviews from critics. On the review aggregator website Rotten Tomatoes, 80% of 5 critics' reviews are positive, with an average rating of 6.4/10.

Baradwaj Rangan, reviewing for Galatta Plus, described the film as "magical" and "an instant classic" and continued that "to experience a film like this – at once muddled and filled with clarity – is to feel transcendentally alive." Simon Abrams from RogerEbert.com gave the film 3.5 out of 4 and wrote that "Nanpakal Nerathu Mayakkam feels like a deep and abidingly strange trip to Pellissery's memory palace" and that "Pellissery confirms his prominence among a new wave of Malayalam-speaking Indian filmmakers."

Anna M. M. Vetticad of Firstpost gave the film 3 out of 5 and wrote "Apart from the music and sound design, the highlight of Nanpakal Nerathu Mayakkam is its immersive central performance...the thespian does not give either James or Sundaram any quirks, yet masterfully conveys their divergent personalities leaving us in no doubt as to who is who and when. This team-up with Lijo confirms that Mammootty is steering his career into a whole new experimental phase, embracing not just the sort of middle-of-the-road, slice-of-life ventures that have endeared Malayalam cinema to a pan-India audience, but also entering an unapologetically philosophical arena."

Prem Udayabhanu of Onmanorama reviewed the film as post-siesta drama a lofty cinematic experience and wrote "The orchestrated chaos we see in Jallikattu or Churuli is amiss. But through the interplay of hallucination and trance Lijo's scriptwriter S Harish infuses into Mammotty's character, the master craftsman pulls the actor and the audience to a lofty plain of cinematic excellence. We cannot but embrace this irrational reel exuberance."

Analysing the movie, Sajesh Mohan of Onmanorama wrote In ‘Nanpakal Nerathu Mayakkam’, Lijo Jose Pellissery must have asked cinematographer Theni Eswar to observe the actors like a master of mindfulness. For that's what his camera does. The shots are static yet the frames are dynamic and once the film enters Sundaram's village through James's siesta dream, the shots acquire an aura that makes it resemble the visualisations of a Tao master. In lieu of adding haze and glow or grading the dream sequence differently, Theni Eswar achieves a differentiation relying on the aesthetic method of frames within a frame.

Manoj Kumar R. of The Indian Express rated the film 3.5 out of 5 and wrote "The visuals are almost meditative. Every frame tells more than one story."

== Box office ==
The film grossed ₹1.02 crore at the Kerala box office on its first day of release. The film grossed ₹4.5 crore at the Indian box office in the three days. In the two weeks, the film grossed ₹9.7 crore at the Worldwide box office.

== Accolades ==
Year	Award/Festival	Category	Recipient
2022	International Film Festival of Kerala	The Silver Crow Pheasant Award (Rajatha Chakoram)	Nanpakal Nerathu Mayakkam - Lijo Jose Pellissery
2022	Padmarajan Award	Best Director	Lijo Jose Pellissery
2023	53rd Kerala State Film Awards	Best Film	Lijo Jose Pellissery; George Sebastian (as producer)
2023	53rd Kerala State Film Awards	Best Actor	Mammootty
2024	69th Filmfare Awards South	Best Actor (Malayalam)	Mammootty

== Trivia ==
In an interview at the 2025 edition of Mathrubhumi’s ‘Ka’ Literature Festival, Prakash Varma stated that a 60-second advertisement film he directed in 2005 as part of Greenply Plywood’s ‘Janam Janam Ka Saathi’ advertising campaign inspired Lijo Jose Pellissery to make Nanpakal Nerathu Mayakkam, a feature film with a runtime of approximately one hour and forty-five minutes.
