= Arjun Menon =

American singer (born 1987)

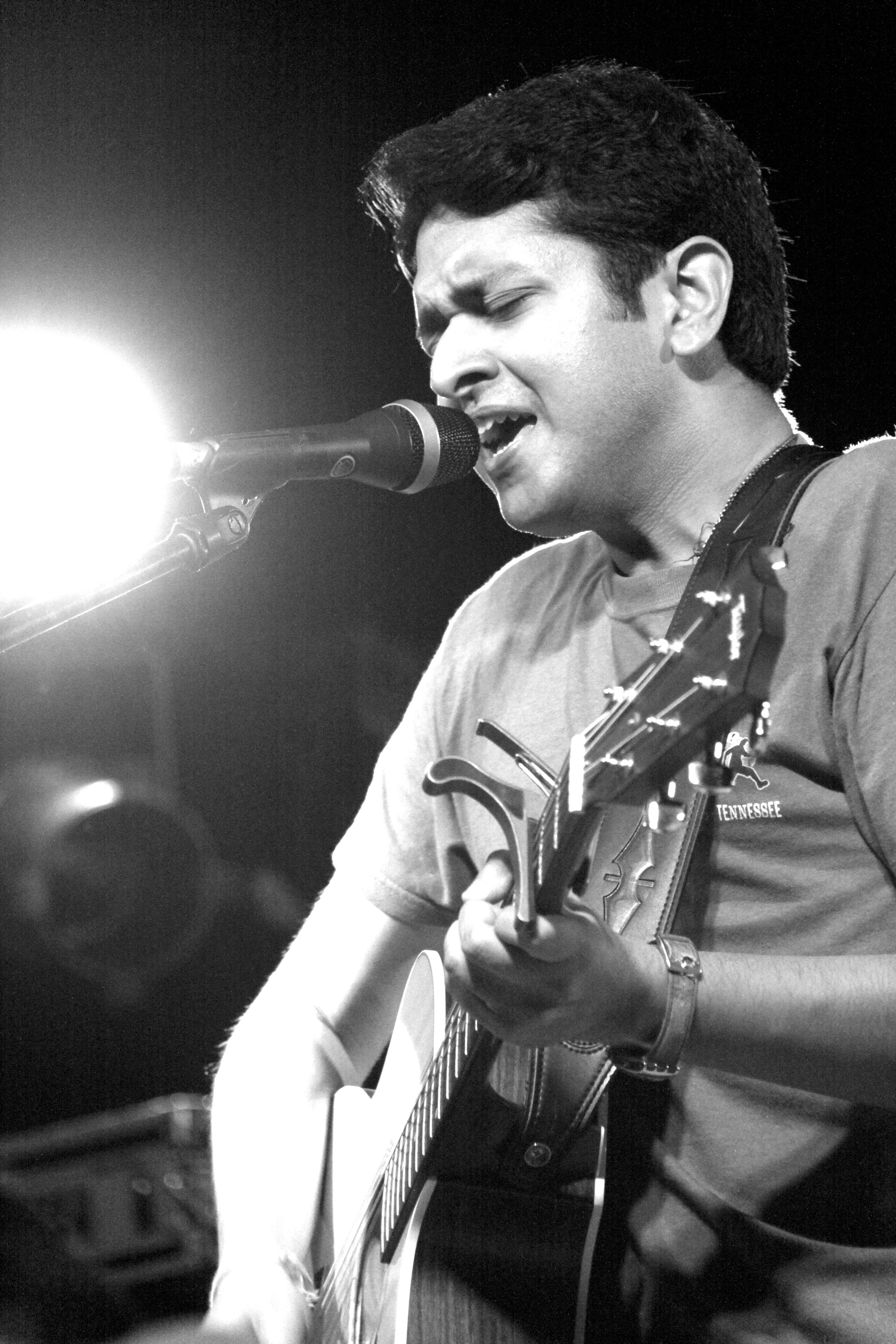
- Menon in 2012

Background information
- Born: 19 December 1987 (age 38); Chennai
- Genres: Film Music, Indian Classical Music
- Occupations: Singer, Musician
- Instruments: Vocalist, Acoustic Guitar
- Years active: 2011 – present

Arjun Menon (born 19 December 1987) is an Indian playback singer and songwriter based in New York City and London. He has sung for music directors including A.R. Rahman, Harris Jayaraj and G.V Prakash. Arjun started his music career performing Carnatic music as a solo artist and subsequently performed several shows across the country collaborating with top musicians. He sang the re-recording song "Kulu Kulu Venpani Pola" for the movie Engeyum Kadhal, which was composed and penned by Harris Jayaraj. His playblack debut and big break came with the song "Latcham Calorie" from the movie Yaan in 2014.

== Early life ==
Arjun was born on 19 December 1987 into a family of music connoisseurs. His parents, Prem Menon and Usha, discovered his love for music at a young age and initiated his vocal training when he was four. He started learning Carnatic music under several gurus, including Ajay Namboodiri and Prof. Ramamoorthy Rao (a disciple of Bhimsen Joshi). He was also briefly under the tutelage of Chitravina Ravikiran. He performed his first stage show at the age of five.

He performed several Carnatic concerts from 1997 to 2003 and performed at the prestigious Tiruvaiyyaru Tyagaraja Aradhana in the years 1999 and 2000. During his schooling, Arjun was exposed to several genres of music which inspired him to learn to play the acoustic guitar. He won several competitions organized by groups like the Sangam Kala Group and the Annual Swathi Smrithi Music Competition.

In 2001, Arjun played the role of Ayyappan in the Malayalam television series Swami Ayyappan. The series was directed by P. N. Menon and was broadcast on Asianet.

While at college, Arjun took part in several inter-college culturals. He won several awards, including Best Vocalist at Pradharshini in 2006 (conducted by the Kilpauk Medical College) and Light Music Vocal - Solo Title at Saarang in 2009. While at college, he formed the band Clarity in Confusion.

Arjun completed his school education at Chinmaya Vidyalaya, Taylors Road in 2005. He went on to complete a bachelor's degree in electrical and electronics engineering at Sri Venkateswara College of Engineering in 2009. He also holds a PGDBA in operations management from SCDL, Pune. He speaks English, Tamil and Malayalam fluently, and sings in Tamil, Hindi, Telugu, Malayalam and Urdu.

== Career ==
=== Music ===
Arjun's music career started at a young age. He started performing carnatic music concerts across the country as a solo artist, often accompanying his gurus. He appeared on Isai Unplugged, a television show on the Zee Tamil channel, in 2010. The show ran for over a year and saw him collaborate with several prominent musicians. In the second season of the show, in 2013, he performed with his melodic rock band CinC.

He sang the re-recording song "Kulu Kulu Venpani Pola", composed by Harris Jeyaraj, in the Kollywood movie Engeyum Kadhal in 2011. He also sang on the soundtracks of several other films, including Saguni and Thalaiva. During this period, he collaborated with several independent musicians and sang on gospel and devotional albums.

Arjun's playback debut came in 2014 with the song "Latcham Calorie" from the movie Yaan. The song received great reviews from both critics and music lovers and reached the Radio Mirchi Top 20 Tamil Songs (peak position 5), Suryan FM Top 20 Tamil (peak position 1), Behindwoods Top 10 Songs (peak position 4) and #3 in Qatar iTunes Top 100.

Arjun has performed over 400 shows across India, the US and Canada. He has also judged music competitions at corporate and educational institutions, including Anna University, SIET, Meenakshi Dental College, AJUBA, Cognizant and Ethiraj College. He regularly performs gigs with his melodic rock band CinC.

== Discography ==
=== Film songs ===
Year	Song	Film	Language	Music Director	Co-Singers	Lyricist
2011	"Kulu Kulu Venpani Pola"	Engeyum Kadhal	Tamil	Harris Jayaraj	Solo	Harris Jayaraj
2012	"Mila Mila"	Ninnu Choosthe Love Vasthundi	Telugu	Harris Jayaraj	Solo	Vanamali
2014	"Latcham Calorie"	Yaan	Tamil	Harris Jayaraj	Chinmayi	Pa. Vijay
2015	"Neerambal Poovae"	Nannbenda	Tamil	Harris Jayaraj	MC. Vickey	Thamarai
2015	"Laksha Calorie"	Nene	Telugu	Harris Jayaraj	Chinmayi	Vanamali

=== Title songs for television soap operas ===
Year	Song	Program	Language	Channel	Notes
2012	"Thumbikkai Azhaga"	Shree Ganesh	Tamil	Zee Tamil	
2012	"Title Song"	Olimayamaana Yedhirkaalam	Instrumental	Zee Tamil	Credited as composer
2012	"Ulahi Ulahi"	Merku Mambalathil Oru Kadhal	Tamil	Zee Tamil	

== Personal life ==
Arjun is married to Preethi, a software professional. They have a daughter, Aria.

== Fundraising ==
Arjun has performed at fundraiser shows for Rotary International, Round Table and the TANKER foundation. He regularly performs for children with special needs and has also performed at orphanages including Udavum Karangal.
