= Shamsudheen Cherpulassery =

Indian magician

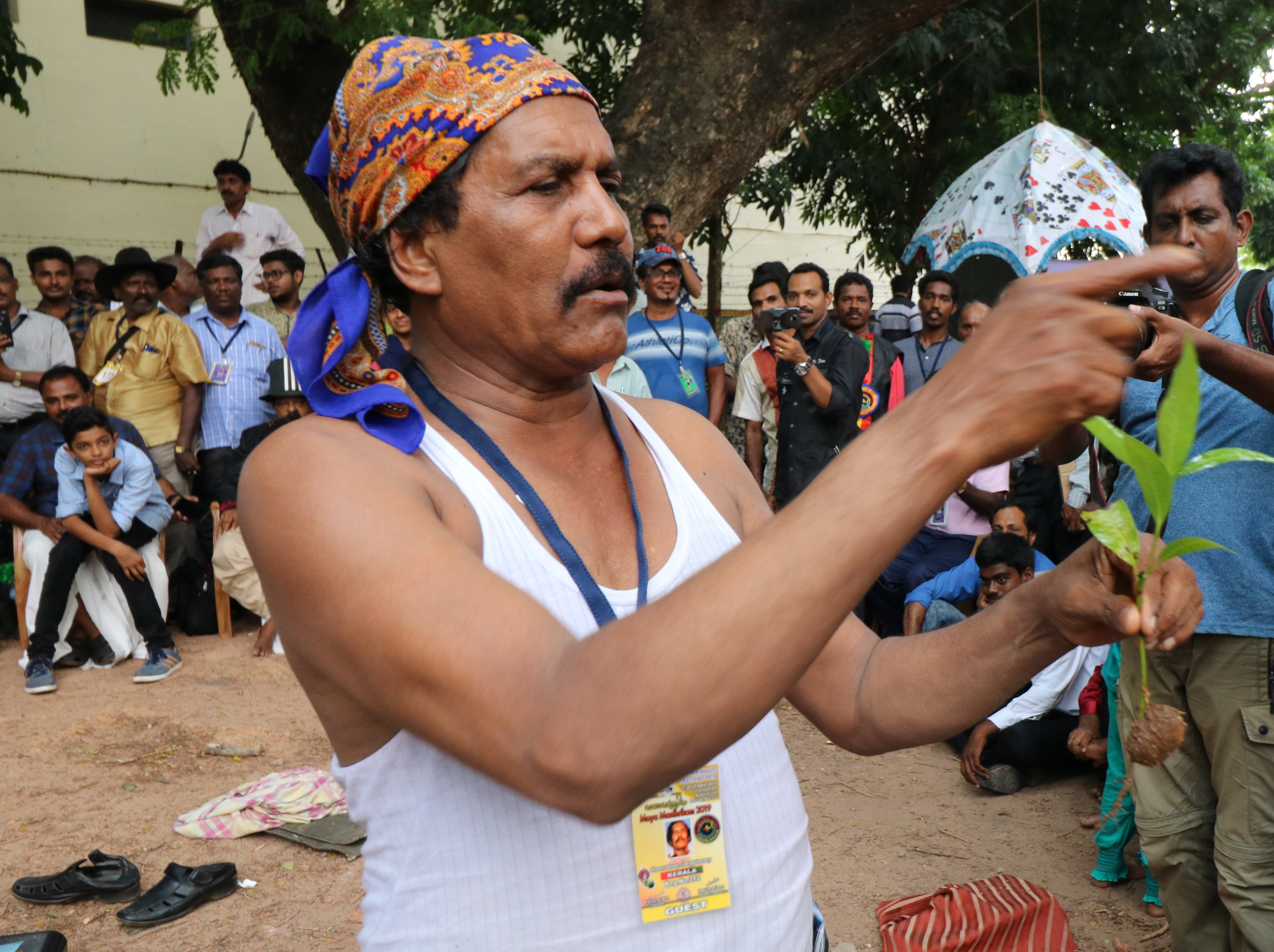
- Shamsudheen performing a magic trick in Kollam, April 2019
- Born: Cherpulassery, Palakkad district, Kerala
- Occupation: Magician
- Known for: The green mango tree trick
- Awards: Kerala Sangeetha Nataka Akademi Award (2014)

Shamsudheen Cherpulassery is an Indian magician from Kerala. He won the Kalasree award from Kerala Sangeeta Nataka Akademi in 2014. He is an expert in the "Mango Trick" magic.

== Biography ==
Shamsudheen's father Hassan Sahib was a street magician. He was the first guru for Shamsudheen in magic. Shamudheen is maintaining his livelihood through street magic. The Time Magazine and The Hindu have reported about his Mango trick. He has acted in the Malayalam movie Lord Livingstone 7000 Kandi.

== Awards ==
- Kerala Sangeetha Nataka Akademi Award (Kalasree) from Kerala Sangeetha Nataka Akademi (2014)
