= Sherlock Toms =

Malayalam film

- Theatrical release poster
- Directed by: Shafi
- Screenplay by: Sachy; Najeem Koya
- Based on: Man on a Ledge by Pablo Fenjves
- Produced by: Prem Menon
- Starring: Biju Menon; Miya; Srinda Arhaan; Salim Kumar; Vijayaraghavan; Hareesh Perumanna
- Cinematography: Alby
- Edited by: V. Saajan
- Music by: Songs: Bijibal; Background Score: Rahul Raj
- Production company: Global United Media
- Release date: 29 September 2017
- Country: India
- Language: Malayalam

Sherlock Toms is a 2017 Indian Malayalam-language comedy film directed by Shafi and written by Sachy. The film stars Biju Menon, Miya, Srinda Arhaan, Salim Kumar, and Kalabhavan Shajohn. It was produced by Prem Menon under his Global United Media. The plot follows the encounters of Thomas, an Indian Revenue Service employee, who is fondly called Sherlock Toms due to his shrewd intelligence and keen observation skills. The film was inspired by Hollywood flick Man on a Ledge . The film was released on 29 September 2017.

== Plot ==
Thomas Joy is an avid fan of Sherlock Holmes, a character created by Arthur Conan Doyle. His friends call him 'Sherlock Toms' due to his keen observation skills. Despite some childhood difficulties he grows up to be an IRS officer but has a troubled relationship with Rekha, whom he married accidentally.

Tom learns that a chit fund company called Mannanam has a large amount of black money. Under the disguise of a poor man who came to pawn a necklace, he enters the chit fund company, but Rekha intervenes and foils his plan, after she reveals his true identity to the branch manager, which made them to shift the money. By conducting am unfruitful raid, he caused damage to their vault and got suspended. Tom attributes it to his Rekha's behaviour and has an argument with her. She calls the police and alleges Tom hit her. He then faces court cases brought by Rekha and the chit fund company. When it becomes apparent his lawyer is not succeeding in proving his innocence, Tom loudly threatens to commit suicide. The judge orders Tom to undergo a treatment but during the commotion, he flees and enters a large hotel opposite to the office of another branch of the chit fund company from where he demands the lifting of his suspension and a divorce from Rekha. He and Rekha argue while he is still about to commit suicide and exposes his toxic relationship and abuse he suffered from her in front of hundreds and TV. He also asks for a rock band to play music while he stood there and demanded a reporter Shiney Mattummel speak to him. Tom reveals to everyone that due to her ruthless behaviour, the chit fund company shifted the money, where everyone including Shiney gets shocked. Rekha reveals that she thought that Tom had an affair with someone in the company and when the company's staff made false stories about them, she didn't reveal anything to anyone as she wanted Tom to see him being insulted.

In the hotel room, which he gatecrashes, he discovers cancelled currencies which he shows to the gathered media reporting about him. When the police rescue team captured him, Tom confesses his suicide threat was a distraction to get the company raided thereby clearing his name.

== Cast ==
- Biju Menon as P.L.Thomas Varghese IRS alias Sherlock Toms, Deputy Commissioner of Income Tax/ Deputy Director of Enforcement Directorate
  - Dhananjay as Young Toms
- Salim Kumar as Chavaro Ashan
- Miya as Shiney Mattummel, TV reporter
- Srinda Ashab as Rekha Toms aka Sabdarekha, Toms's wife
- Vijayakumar as Sathyaprathapan IPS, Commissioner
- Hareesh Perumanna as Fakrudeen aka Fakru, Police constable
- Suresh Krishna as R. Kannan Nair, Kerala Fire and Rescue Services officer
- Kalabhavan Shajon as Sugunan Master
- Kottayam Nazeer as SI Shinto
- Jayan Cherthala as P. Sundaram, Joint Director of Enforcement
- Noby Marcose as Madan Thulasi
- Rafi as Saghav Lazar, Thomas's father
- Vijayaraghavan as Unneesho Mappila
- Dinesh Prabhakar as Constable Raghu
- Sadiq as Adv.Sambashivan P. K
- Molly Kannamaly as Kuruvi Thathi
- Sunil Babu as Uvvachu Chacko, son of Chavaro Ashaan
- Saju Kodiyan as Fa. Stephen Kunnummel
- Balaji Sarma as Vinod, Enforcement officer
- Kalyani Nair a Sherly, Enforcement officer
- Anu Joseph as Deepa, Kannan's wife
- Sarayu as Magistrate
- Abu Salim as Markose
- Prasanth Alexander as Joji Tharakan, Branch Manager at Mannanam Chits and Finance, Ravipuram branch
- Sreenivasan as Narrator (Voice Only)
- Kalabhavan Haneef as Jolly
- Vinod Kedamangalam as School Peon
- Nelson as Panthayam Panchi
- Majeed as Prosecutor
- Rajesh Paravoor as Nilavudeen
- Vijayan Karanthoor as SI Chandran, at Alangad Station
- Manju Satheesh as P. Bhanumathy, School H. M
- Manve Surendran as Sushma teacher
- Riyas K.H as Stranger in Bank
