= Praise the Lord (film) =

- Theatrical release poster
- Directed by: Shibu Ganghadharan
- Screenplay by: T. P. Devarajan
- Based on: Praise the Lord by Zacharia
- Produced by: Milan Jaleel
- Starring: Mammootty; Akanksha Puri; Mukesh
- Cinematography: Pradeep Nair
- Edited by: Sreekanth
- Music by: Shaan Rahman; Bijibal
- Production company: Galaxy Films
- Distributed by: Galaxy Films & Multiplex Movies; Tricolor Entertainment
- Release date: 20 March 2014
- Running time: 125 minutes
- Country: India
- Language: Malayalam

Praise the Lord is a 2014 Malayalam film directed by Shibu Gangadharan and starring Mammootty, Akanksha Puri and Mukesh . The film has been adapted from Zacharia's eponymous novelette, T. P. Devarajan has written the screenplay. The film was produce by Milan Jaleel under his banner Galaxy Films. It was released on 20 March 2014.

== Cast ==
- Mammootty as Aanamadayil Joy
- Akanksha Puri as Annie
- Mukesh as Sunny
- Reenu Mathews as Ancy
- Ahmed Sidhique as Samkutty
- Anoop Krishnan as Samkutty's friend
- Kalabhavan Shajon as Father Antony
- Joy Mathew as Kaduvakunnil Kunjutty
- Suresh Krishna as C.I. Balakrishnan
- Mani C. Kappan as M P Mathachan
- Indrans as Chacko
- Kailash as Alwin, Annie's boyfriend
- Sadiq as Kuttappan
- Sajitha Betti as Kochu Rani
- Anoop Chandran as Sonykutty
- Dinesh Panicker as Cherian Varghese
- Pauly as Karthyayani
- Noby as Kulappuram Vakkan
- Adinad Sasi as Kunjiraman
- Mohan Ayiroor as Yohannan
- Kalabhavan Haneef as Police constable
- Nasser Lathif as English Sermon Preacher

== Music ==
The film features songs composed by Shaan Rahman while Bijibal composed the background score. Manorama Music bought the music rights of Praise the Lord.

== Reception ==
=== Critical reception ===
The Times of India rated the film 2/5 stars and characterised Praise the Lord as a glossy appearance that vainly tries to mask a weak story, and the narrative is "over-populated with scenes and sequences and actors seldom being just to the lovable characters on the book." Mammootty's performance was considered "wasted" in the poor narrative; Reenu Mathews's performance seemed "off guard." The narrative is described as "dull, faded," lacking flow and rhythm, while also noting that it fails to capture the "blissful comic strain" of the book.
