= Dancer (2005 film) =

- Poster
- Directed by: Keyaar
- Written by: Keyaar
- Produced by: Yogesh KR
- Starring: J. Kutty; Robert; Kaniha
- Cinematography: J. A. Robert
- Edited by: R. T. Annadurai
- Music by: Pravin Mani
- Production company: KR Infotainment Pvt. Ltd.
- Release date: 12 January 2005
- Running time: 99 minutes
- Country: India
- Language: Tamil

Dancer is a 2005 Indian Tamil-language dance film written and directed by Keyaar. The film was produced by Yogesh KR under KR Infotainment Pvt. Ltd. The film which revolves around a physically challenged dancer with one leg was released on 12 January 2005.

== Cast ==
- J. Kutty as Kutty
- Robert as Arun
- Kaniha as Divya
- Chinni Jayanth
- Kaka Radhakrishnan
- Manivannan
- Delhi Ganesh
- Vasu Vikram
- T. P. Gajendran
- K. S. Jayalakshmi
- Meera Krishnan
- Bayilvan Ranganathan
- O. A. K. Sundar
- Swaminathan
- Raviraj
- Master Udayaraj as Kutty's friend
- Keyaar in a special appearance

== Production ==
Keyaar was inspired to direct the film with Kutty, a one legged handicapped dancer after seeing him dancing at a concert at Kamarajar auditorium. Kutty did not appear in further films aside from By the People (2005) and Lee (2007) as he died by falling down stairs in 2007.

== Soundtrack ==
Soundtrack was composed by Pravin Mani and lyrics were written by Pa. Vijay and Na. Muthukumar.

- "Dancer" — Karthik, Suresh Peters
- "Jingulu Jingale" — Rafi, Suchitra
- "Kothavaranga" — Mathangi, Gopal
- "Iraiva" — S. P. Balasubrahmanyam
- "Sonnathu" — Srinivas

== Reception ==
Malathi Rangarajan of The Hindu wrote, "Despite a logical story line, a docu-feel does crop up now and then [...] The ideal is lofty. But the insensitivity in execution (for the most part) is disconcerting". Malini Mannath wrote for Chennai Online, "Though Dancer is predictable story-telling, it's a film you would not regret watching".

== Bibliography ==
- Dhananjayan, G. (2014). Pride of Tamil Cinema: 1931–2013. Blue Ocean Publishers. OCLC 898765509.
