= Kammatipaadam =

2016 film by Rajeev Ravi

Kammattippaadam
- Theatrical release poster
- Directed by: Rajeev Ravi
- Written by: P. Balachandran
- Story by: Rajeev Ravi
- Produced by: Prem Menon
- Starring: Dulquer Salmaan; Vinayakan; Shaun Romy; Manikandan R Achari; Shine Tom Chacko
- Cinematography: Madhu Neelakandan
- Edited by: B. Ajithkumar
- Music by: K
- Production company: Global United Media
- Distributed by: Global United Media
- Release date: 20 May 2016 (India)
- Running time: 175 minutes
- Country: India
- Language: Malayalam

Kammatipaadam, alternatively spelled as Kammatti Paadam, is a 2016 Indian Malayalam-language action drama film directed by Rajeev Ravi and written by P. Balachandran. The film stars Dulquer Salmaan, Vinayakan, Shaun Romy, Manikandan R. Achari, Vinay Forrt, Shine Tom Chacko, and Suraj Venjaramoodu. The songs were composed by K, John P. Varkey and Vinayakan while the background score was composed by K.

The film centers on Kammattippaadam, a slum locality in Kochi, Kerala. It focuses on how the Dalit community was forced to give up their lands to real-estate mafias and how modern urbanisation of Kochi metro-city took place over the plight of the Dalits. The film won four awards at the 47th Kerala State Film Awards, including Best Actor, Best Supporting Actor, Best Art Director and Best Film Editing. It has been listed by several publications as one of the best Malayalam films of the decade and a defining movie of the New Wave Movement.

== Plot ==
In the 1980s, Krishnan is a primary school student in Kammattippaadam who befriends Gangadharan/Ganga, the child of a Dalit family. Ganga's brother Balan (known as Balan Chettan) is a thug and is involved in smuggling alcohol. Krishnan and Gangadharan are introduced to violence at a very young age. Krishnan is in love with Ganga's relative Anitha (Anitha is actually Ganga's fiancee as per custom). Krishnan, Ganga, Balan, Venu and others form a gang working for a local real estate conman Surendran (known as Surendran Aashaan). After the gang is involved in a fight, Krishnan kills a police officer while trying to save Ganga. Krishnan goes to prison and returns to Kammattippaadam only to discover that the gang is now more advanced and is smuggling alcohol under the leadership of Surendran.

The gang creates a lot of enemies, which includes Johnny. Krishnan discovers that Ganga is also in love with Anitha and is planning to get married soon. The gang threatens the local people to pressure them into selling their homes at low price. Ganga's grandfather is devastated at his grandchildren's involvement and dies grief-stricken at their disrespect. Balan, who is now a changed man after his grandfather's death, wants to stop everything and lead a peaceful life. One night Balan's wife demands to go to medical shop for some supplies, where they are accompanied by Ganga and Krishnan. Balan tells that he wants to stop his illegal activities and simply wants to live happily with his family in Kammattippaadam by starting a travel agency. During their conversation about Anitha, Balan mentions his wish to see Krishnan marry her, which causes argument between Ganga and Balan. Ganga gets angry and leaves the car.

Later, Balan, Krishnan and Balan's wife Rosamma reach the nearby medical shop. Rosamma and Krishnan walk towards the medical shop, while Balan (who is intoxicated) stays in the car. However, Balan dies after being struck by a truck, later Ganga blames Krishnan for his brother's death and their friendship is torn apart. Later, Krishnan starts a travel agency while Ganga still remains a thug. The gang later hangs out in a bar and a discussion cracks out among the gang members, where they learn that Johnny was the one who planned Balan's murder. An enraged Krishnan and Ganga stab Johnny, landing them in trouble and are chased by the police. Krishnan saves Ganga and is arrested by the police, while Ganga marries Anitha. Krishnan later relocates to Mumbai.

Years later, Krishnan works as a bodyguard in Mumbai, where he receives a call from Ganga. Krishnan learns that Ganga is in danger, where he travels to Kammattippaadam to find Ganga. Krishnan learns about the mishaps created by Ganga and tries to find him with the help of Rosamma. Rosamma suspects that Johnny is behind Ganga's problems, where Krishnan sets on a journey to find Johnny. Johnny, who is paralysed after Ganga stabbed him, tells that he is not aware of Ganga's whereabouts. Krishnan beats down all of Johnny's gang members but is stabbed by Johnny's brother Sunny.

Later, Krishnan is left heartbroken when he learns that Ganga's corpse has been found. Krishnan seeks the help of Surendran, who is now a business entrepreneur, to find the real killer only to discover that Surendran is the one who murdered Ganga. Surendran reveals that he killed Ganga due to his constant disturbance and demands for money. Krishnan kills Surendran by kicking him out the window of his apartment built on the swamps on Kammattippaadam.

== Cast ==
- Dulquer Salmaan as Krishnan
  - Shalu Rahim as Teen Krishnan
    - Master Ashish as Young Krishnan
- Vinayakan as Gangadharan aka Ganga
  - Praveen as Teen Ganga
    - Master Lenoy as Young Ganga
- Shaun Romy as Anitha (voice over by Srinda Arhaan)
- Manikandan R Achari as Balakrishnan/Balan Chettan
- Vinay Forrt as Venu
- Shine Tom Chacko as Johnny
- Anil Nedumangad as Surendran aka Aashaan
- Amalda Liz as Rosamma
- P. Balachandran as Krishnan's father
- Rasika Dugal as Juhi
- Suraj Venjarammood as Sumesh
- Alencier Ley Lopez as Mathai
- Anjali Aneesh as Krishnan's mother
- Muthumani as Krishnan's sister
- Sreekanth Chandran as Martin (Police Officer)
- Shane Nigam as Sunny, Johnny's brother
- Ganapathi as Charlie
- Vijayakumar Prabhakaran as Paranki Majeed
- Soubin Shahir as Karate Biju (extended cameo)
- Sidharth Rajendran as Thola Benny
- Divya Gopinath as Paranki Majeed's wife
- Vishnu Raghu as Abu
- Sudarshan Appangad as Achachan

== Themes and influences ==
Ernakulam was a small town during the early 1950s, and during the first communist government of EMS Namboodiripad in 1957, small tracts of farm land were given to all landless community, mainly to the Dalit community, under the Land Reforms Ordinance Act. But in the later years, Ernakulam boomed into a metro city, and real estate skyrocketed. The swamps and paddy fields were converted to housing boards, luxury villas and apartments.

Kammatipadam shows how the Dalits were forced by their own brethren (depicted in the film as Balan Chettan and gang) to sell out their lands to the real estate mafia, of which the members were born among them (represented by Surendran aka Aashaan in the film). It is an irony that Balan Chettan and Gangadharan who work as goons of the mafia themselves are grandsons of a staunch Communist grandfather (Achachan in the film). Father of Gangadharan is also depicted as strong believer of Communism, who reads only Deshabhimani, the official Communist daily. By the time Balan and the gang understood the reality, literally, they lost the ground under their feet and even their lives. Dalits had no right over the lands through generations, but when they received it, their own next generation's irresponsible and uncivil deeds, despite the warning from elders, led to losing those rights. The events in the movie show how undesirable events unfold within a community that does not understand the meaning of liberty and lacks unity and civility. Because of the rude deeds of few uncivil minds in their own community, the history of Dalits repeats, as most of them lose their lands and existence itself. Although the film upholds intercaste friendship and marriage values, the main characters' lives are depicted to be wasted due to their irresponsible and impulsive behaviour.

== Production ==
The film started production in September 2015 in Mumbai. The title Kammattipaadam was announced in February 2016. The filming was completed on 10 March 2016 and the release was scheduled for May 2016. A one-minute twenty five second long trailer of film was released on 16 May in YouTube.

== Soundtrack ==
The soundtrack features songs composed by three composers, namely K, John P. Varkey and Vinayakan. The background score was composed by K.

Kammatipaadam

Soundtrack album by John P. Varkey, K, Vinayakan
- Released: 19 May 2016
- Recorded: 2015–2016
- Genre: Feature film soundtrack
- Length: 16:14
- Language: Malayalam
- Label: Muzik247
- Producers: John P. Varkey; K Vinayakan

John P. Varkey chronology
Olipporu (2013)	Kammatipaadam (2016)	Eeda (2018)

K chronology
Kirumi (2015)	Kammatipaadam (2016)	Aandavan Kattalai (2016)

Vinayakan chronology
Kammatipaadam (2016)	Trance (2020)

Track listing
No.	Title	Lyrics	Music	Singer(s)	Length
1.	"Para Para"	Anwar Ali	John P. Varkey	Anoop Mohandas, Sunil Mathai, Sarath, Syam	3:47
2.	"Chingamaasathile"	Dileep K.G	John P. Varkey	Anoop Mohandas	4:15
3.	"Kaathirunna Pakshi Njan"	Anwar Ali	K	Karthik	4:13
4.	"Puzhu Pulikal"	Anwar Ali	Vinayakan	Sunil Mathai, Savio Laz	3:58
Total length:					16:14

== Release ==
=== Theatrical ===
Kammatipaadam was released in theatres on 20 May 2016.

=== Home media ===
The DVDs and VCDs of the film were released on 10 August 2016.

== Reception ==
=== Critical reception ===
Anurag Kashyap described Kammatipaadam as one of the best gangster films and also appreciated the cast performances.

Gowtham VS of The Indian Express wrote: "Rajiv Ravi has dismantled all conventional concepts of Malayali aesthetics by capturing the unadulterated beauty of black skin through characters who portrayed the lives of Dalits. The director has continued to use his anarchic concepts of visualisation, which include shaky shots, blurred frames and sometimes abrupt sequences. The realistic and daring approach of Rajiv Ravi deserves standing ovation at times when the paper tigers in this industry still fear to come up with something different from the old mould." Indiaglitz described it as "one classy movie which needs to be applauded for its passion and intensity".

=== Box office ===
The film has collected ₹1.52 crore (US$160,000) on its opening day at the Kerala box office, becoming the fifth Malayalam film of 2016 with highest first day collection after Kali, King Liar, Darvinte Parinamam and Action Hero Biju and within three days of release ₹27 lakh (US$28,000) from the Kochi multiplexes and ₹5.66 lakh (US$5,900) from the Chennai box office. It collected ₹7 crore (US$730,000) from all over India in its first week. The film collected around ₹12 crore (US$1.2 million) within 12 days from all India box office. The film collected ₹19.13 lakh (US$20,000) during its third weekend in the U.S. market. The film was a super hit collecting ₹15 crore (equivalent to ₹22 crore or US$2.2 million in 2023) from Kerala box office, the budget was ₹7.80 crore (US$810,000).

== Awards ==
Kerala State Film Awards (2016)

- Best Actor – Vinayakan
- Best Character Actor – Manikandan R. Achari
- Best Film Editor – B. Ajithkumar
- Best Art Director – Gokuldas N. V., S. Nagaraj

Filmfare Awards South (2017)

- Won, Critics Best Actor – Malayalam – Dulquer Salmaan
- Won, Best Supporting Actor – Vinayakan
  - Nominated, Best Film – Kammatipaadam
  - Nominated, Best Director – Rajeev Ravi
  - Nominated, Best Lyricist – Anwar Ali for "Para Para"

South Indian International Movie Awards (2016)

- Won, Best Film – Kammatipaadam
  - Nominated, Best Director – Rajeev Ravi
  - Nominated, Best Actor in a Supporting Role – Vinayakan
  - Nominated, Best Debut Actor – Manikandan R. Achari
  - Nominated, Best Lyricist – Anwar Ali for "Puzhu Pulikal"

IIFA Utsavam (2017)

- Won, Best Performance In A Supporting Role - Male – Vinayakan
  - Nominated, Best Picture – Kammatipaadam
  - Nominated, Best Direction – Rajeev Ravi
  - Nominated, Best Story – Rajeev Ravi
  - Nominated, Best Performance In A Negative Role – Anil Nedumangad
  - Nominated, Best Music Direction – John P. Varkey
  - Nominated, Best Lyrics – Anwar Ali for "Para Para"
