= North 24 Kaatham =

2013 film by Anil Radhakrishnan Menon

- Theatrical poster
- Directed by: Anil Radhakrishnan Menon
- Written by: Anil Radhakrishnan Menon
- Produced by: C. V. Sarathi
- Starring: Fahadh Faasil; Nedumudi Venu; Swathi Reddy
- Cinematography: Jayesh Nair
- Edited by: Dilip
- Music by: Rex Vijayan; Govind Vasantha
- Production company: E4 Entertainment
- Release date: 15 September 2013
- Running time: 125 minutes
- Country: India
- Language: Malayalam

North 24 Kaatham is a 2013 Indian Malayalam language adventure drama film written and directed by Anil Radhakrishnan Menon (in his directorial debut). The film features Fahadh Faasil, Nedumudi Venu, and Swathi Reddy in the lead roles. The background score is composed by Govind Vasantha. The movie was released as an Onam release on 15 September 2013. It was well received by critics and won the National Film Award for Best Feature Film in Malayalam. It is widely regarded as one of the defining movies of the Malayalam New Wave. The Plan Man is considered as an inspired movie.

== Plot ==
Harikrishnan is a geeky software architect who suffers from Obsessive–compulsive personality disorder and rigid righteousness. His colleagues find it hard to work with him due to his emotional outbursts and odd mannerisms, though the company leadership values him as a core asset to the organization. His colleagues hatch a plan to send him off to Thiruvananthapuram to demonstrate on a webinar, one of the company's top-selling products, which also happens to be developed by Hari. Unfortunately for him, the date of his journey coincides with a harthal day. While going to Thiruvananthapuram by train, in the middle of the night, his co-passenger Gopalan, a veteran politician, receives a call informing him that his wife is seriously ill. As soon as the train leaves Kollam, Gopalan, growing concerned about his wife's health decides to change his plan and return to his hometown in Kozhikode to attend to his ailing wife. Seeing the situation, another passenger Narayani a.k.a. Nani, a social worker, decides to join Gopalan. They get down at Paravur railway station. In the confusion to get down at Paravur, Gopalan accidentally drops his cell phone on the train before disembarking. Hari notices the ringing phone when Gopalan's friend Moidheen calls him up to inform him about his wife's death. Hari picks up the call and hears the sad news. Not knowing how to react in this situation, Hari also gets down at Paravur on the pretext of forgetting his bag on the train. Hari decides to follow Narayani and Gopalan on their return journey to Kozhikode. The plan not only upsets his daily routine and schedule but also disturbs his standard of hygiene. Nani on the other hand is carefree and unlike Hari, goes out of her way to help others. The journey becomes a learning experience for Hari and how he understands and overcomes various trying situations in life. The film ends with Hari and Nani falling in love and him finally overcoming his OCPD.

== Cast ==
- Fahadh Faasil as Harikrishnan, an IT Professional from Kochi, on a journey to Thiruvananthapuram for a webinar.
- Nedumudi Venu as Gopalan, a retired school teacher who is on a journey to Thiruvananthapuram for certification issues of his neighbour.
- Swathi Reddy as Narayani aka Nani, an NGO activist in Thiruvananthapuram from Shornur.
- Chemban Vinod Jose as Mustafa, an NRI who is trapped in Kochi on Harthal Day. He needs to move to Chavakkad to see his newly born baby
- Sadiq as Minister
- Mukundan as S I
- Thalaivasal Vijay as Sreekumar, Hari's father
- Jinu Joseph as Sam, Office Executive, a short-tempered on the spot
- Geetha as Maya, Hari's mother
- Sreenath Bhasi as Siddharth a.k.a. Sid, Hari's brother, Red FM RJ
- Premgi Amaren as Vyomkesh, A Tamil guy who married a Kutchi girl
- Kani Kusruti as Kutchi woman who married Vyomkesh
- Leona Lishoy as Simi [A new joinee in Harikrishnan's office]
- Srinda Arhaan as Priya, Hari's Colleague
- Disney James as the Railway Guard.
- Nirmal Palazhi
- Khalid Rahman as Auto Driver
- V.P. Khalid as Minister's P.A.
- Prigi Abigail Benger
- Privin Vinish
- Chinnu Kuruvila as Prathibha
- Pushpa Mathew as Nivedita
- Deepak Nathan as Happy Singh, The Hindi speaking guy in the office who hates Hari
- Sudhi Koppa

== Production ==
Produced under the banner of E4 Entertainment, the film sports cinematography by Jayesh Nair and music by Govind Menon (of Thaikkudam Bridge fame).

Kaatham in Malayalam is a unit of distance measurement that amounts to 16 kilometres. The story evolves during a journey; but it's something beyond a travel movie. The film was scheduled to begin filming in May and spanned various scenic locations across Kerala, since it depicts a journey through most of the state. The film's poster caught attention, with its tongue-in-cheek sketch by National Institute of Design graduate Shilpa Alexander depicting a slice of life in Kerala.

Swathi Reddy confirmed that she had signed up for the film. Mumbai-based Prigi Abigail Benger took part in the auditions for North 24 Kaatham and will make her debut opposite Sreenath Bhasi. Tamil comedian Premgi Amaren would be doing a small role in the film and make his Malayalam debut. He shot a few scenes for a couple of days in June. Srinda Ashab was cast to play an IT professional, and Fahadh's colleague in the film.

== Soundtrack ==
North 24 Kaatham

Soundtrack album by Govind Vasantha and Rex Vijayan
- Released: 2013
- Genre: Feature film soundtrack
- Length: 21:27
- Language: Malayalam
- Label: Anak Audio

Rex Vijayan chronology
Neelakasham Pachakadal Chuvanna Bhoomi (2013)	North 24 Kaatham (2013)	Sapthamashree Thaskaraha (2014)

Govind Vasantha chronology
Asuravithu (2012)	North 24 Kaatham (2013)	Vegam (2014)

North 24 Kaatham
No.	Title	Lyrics	Music	Singer(s)	Length
1.	"Thanaro (Title Track)"	Engandiyoor Chandrasekharan	Rex Vijayan	Sreenath Bhasi	03:51
2.	"Aalillatha Paathaykkinnu (Harthal Punk)"	Rafeeq Ahammed	Govind Vasantha	Aneesh Krishnan, Govind Vasantha	03:58
3.	"Porumo"	Rafeeq Ahammed	Govind Vasantha	Raghu Dixit, Bijibal	04:34
4.	"Tharangal"	Vinayak Sasikumar	Govind Vasantha	Siddharth Menon, Jeba Niyas	05:30
5.	"Pontharam"	Ranjini Menon	Govind Vasantha	Christin Jose, Leah Samuel, Siddharth Menon, Govind Vasantha	03:34
Total length:					21:27

== Reception ==
The film received strongly positive reviews upon release. Sify.com wrote: "North 24 Kaatham is fresh and innovative concept, hilarious at the same time thought provoking and a thoroughly enjoyable ride." Rating the film 3/5, Veeyen of Nowrunning.com said, "'North 24 Kaatham' is an articulation of the randomness of life; of chance and arbitrariness that brings about smiles and rekindles hopes. The emotional pitch that it maintains is mighty, which makes it a highly compassionate film that also marks a brilliant directorial debut." Paresh C Palicha of Rediff.com rated the film 3/5 and concluded his review saying, "North 24 Kaatham is an endearing film and a sure winner for Fahadh Faasil as the leading man and Anil as a debutant director.".

== Accolades ==
National Film Awards (2013)

- Best Feature Film in Malayalam

Kerala State Film Awards (2013)

- Second Best Film
- Best Actor - Fahadh Faasil

Filmfare Awards South

- Filmfare Award for Best Actor - Malayalam - Fahadh Faasil
