= Shishirathil Oru Vasantham =

1980 film by Keyaar

- Directed by: Keyaar
- Written by: Keyaar
- Starring: Shubha; Sukumaran; Kuthiravattam Pappu; Ravikumar
- Cinematography: Ramachandra Babu
- Edited by: Radhakrishnan
- Music by: Shyam
- Production company: Yogideep Creations
- Release date: 10 October 1980
- Country: India
- Language: Malayalam

Shishirathil Oru Vasantham is a 1980 Indian Malayalam-language film, directed by Keyaar. The film stars Shubha, Sukumaran, Kuthiravattam Pappu and Ravikumar. The film has musical score by Shyam.

== Cast ==
- Shubha
- Sukumaran
- Kuthiravattam Pappu
- Ravikumar

== Soundtrack ==
The music was composed by Shyam and the lyrics were written by Poovachal Khader.

No.	Song	Singers	Lyrics	Length (m:ss)
1	"Evide Thanal Saakhikal"	K. J. Yesudas	Poovachal Khader	
2	"Nenjil Nenchu"	S. Janaki, Chorus	Poovachal Khader	
3	"Oru Gaanam Athil Azhakidumoru"	K. J. Yesudas	Poovachal Khader	
4	"Sandhyapole Kunkumam"	Vani Jairam	Poovachal Khader	
