= Kerala Film Chamber of Commerce =

Film association in Kerala

- Formation: 1956
- Headquarters: Kochi, Kerala, India
- Region served: India
- Website: keralafilmchamber.com

The Kerala Film Chamber of Commerce (KFCC) is a trade association in India for the Malayalam-language film industry, representing film producers, distributors, and exhibitors headquartered in Kochi, Kerala. The organisation acts as a coordinating platform for trade issues, mediates disputes within the sector, and engages with government agencies on matters affecting the film industry.

== History ==
The organisation was established in 1956.

In 2022, KFCC introduced an Internal Complaints Committee (ICC) for the Malayalam film sector for entire Malayalam film industry to address workplace abuse.
