= Reenu Mathews =

Indian Malayalam film actress (born 1981)

- Born: India
- Occupations: Actress; model; air hostess
- Years active: 2013-2015

Reenu Mathews is an Indian actress who has acted in Malayalam films. She works as a cabin crew member for the Emirates airline in Dubai. She made her debut in Immanuel (2013), opposite Mammootty, directed by Lal Jose. She has acted with Mohanlal in Ennum Eppozhum, directed by Sathyan Anthikad & with Prithviraj Sukumaran in Sapthamasree Thaskaraha (2014). She has paired with Mammooty again in Praise the Lord (2014).

== Personal life ==
Reenu is the youngest daughter of Mathews and Santhamma at Kottayam. She has an elder brother Ginu.

== Career ==
Reenu Mathews was first cast for the Mammootty-Lal Jose film Pattalam (2003) as heroine. But few days before the shoot begun, she backed out of the project without even informing the team, as she got the job of Air Hostess in Emirates and she didn't want to lose the job at that time. Later she was cast as the heroine for the Mammooty starter 2013 Malayalam film Immanuel, which was also directed by Lal Jose himself and which marked her debut. Next she was seen in 5 Sundarikal (2013) directed by Amal Neerad. She again paired with Mammooty in a 2014 film Praise the Lord. Her next release was Anil Radhakrishna Menon's Sapthamashree Thaskaraha. (2014) and then Amal Neerad's Iyobinte Pustakam (2014). Her latest release was Sathyan Anthikad's Ennum Eppozhum (2015). She was last seen in Lord Livingstone 7000 Kandi (2015) directed by Anil Radhakrishna Menon.

== Filmography ==
Year	Title	Role(s)	Language(s)	Notes
2013	Immanuel	Annie	Malayalam	Debut in Malayalam
2013	5 Sundarikal	Tall Wife	Malayalam	
2013	Praise the Lord	Ancy	Malayalam	
2014	Sapthamashree Thaskaraha	Sarah	Malayalam	
2014	Iyobinte Pustakam	Annamma	Malayalam	
2015	Ennum Eppozhum	Kalyani	Malayalam	
2015	Lord Livingstone 7000 Kandi	Madhumita Krishnan	Malayalam	

== Short films ==
Year	Title	Role(s)	Language(s)	Notes
2006	December Mist	Nisha Varghese	Malayalam	Short film
