= Anil Radhakrishnan Menon =

Indian film director

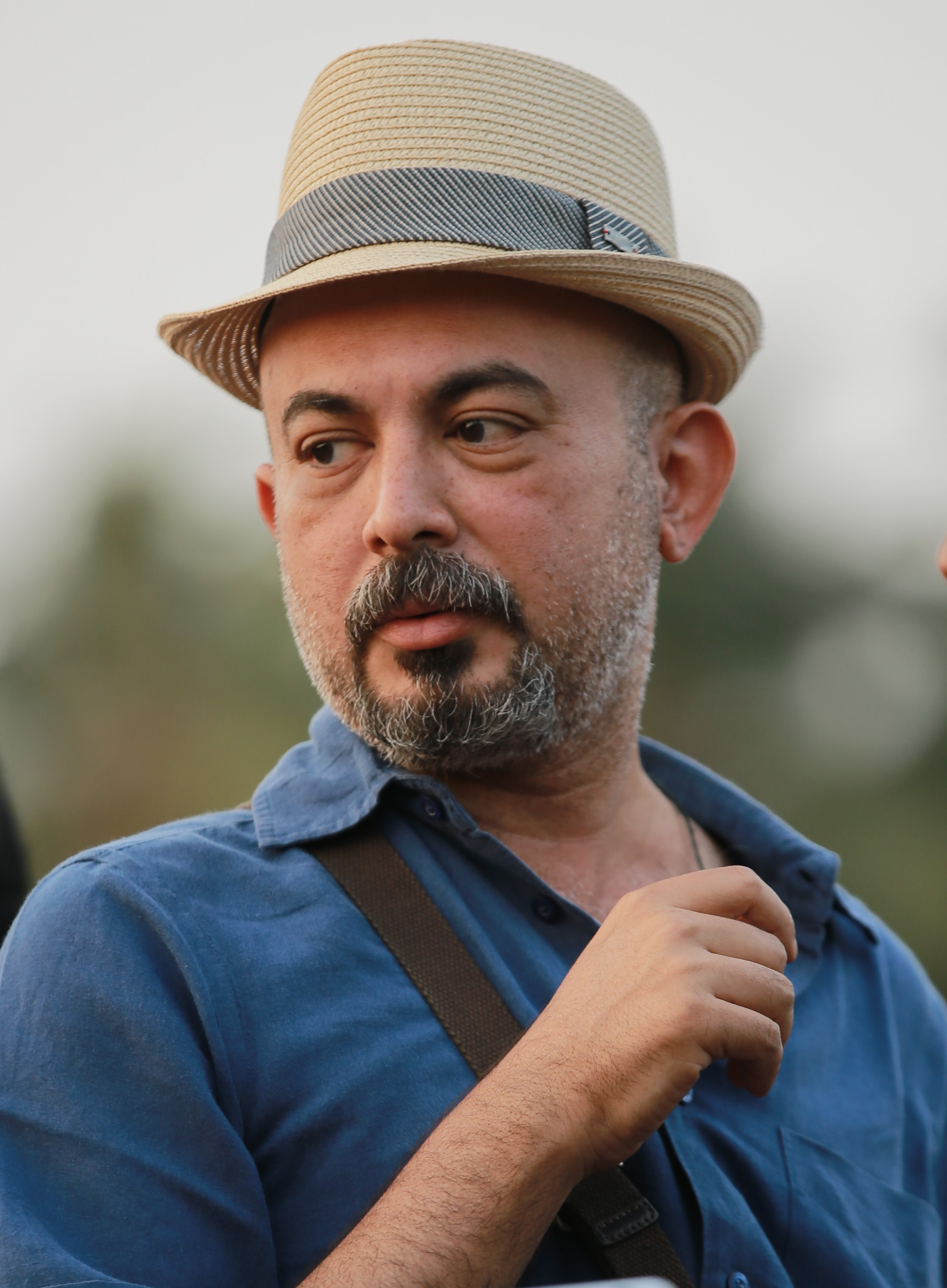
- Born: Ottapalam, Palakkad, Kerala, India
- Education: Government Victoria College, Palakkad; Zamorin's Guruvayurappan College, Kozhikode
- Occupation: Film director
- Years active: 2013–present
- Spouse: Sarada
- Parents: Radhakrishnan Palat; Jayasree

Anil Radhakrishnan Menon is an Indian film director working in the Malayalam film industry.

== Career ==
Anil Radhakrishnan Menon directed television commercials before venturing into feature films.

His first film North 24 Kaatham (2013) starring Fahadh Faasil and Nedumudi Venu won the National Film Award for Best Feature Film in Malayalam and Kerala State Film Award for Second Best Film.

His second film Sapthamashree Thaskaraha (2014) also received positive reviews from critics, and became a blockbuster.

== Filmography ==
Year	Title	Cast
2013	North 24 Kaatham	Fahadh Faasil, Nedumudi Venu, Swati Reddy, Chemban Vinod Jose
2014	Sapthamashree Thaskaraha	Prithviraj, Asif Ali, Nedumudi Venu, Chemban Vinod Jose, Sudheer Karamana, Neeraj Madhav, Salam Bukhari, Sanusha, Reenu Mathews, Joy Mathew, Mukundhan Menon, Irshad, Anu Joseph
2015	Lord Livingstone 7000 Kandi	Kunchako Boban, Bharath, Reenu Mathews, Nedumudi Venu, Chemban Vinod Jose, Sunny Wayne, Jacob Gregory, Sudheer Karamana, Assim Jamal
2017	Diwanjimoola Grand Prix	Kunchako Boban, Nyla Usha, Vinayakan, Nedumudi Venu, Siddique, Sijoy Varghese, Ketaki Narayan

== Personal life ==
Anil's father is Radhakrishnan Palat and mother is Jayasree. He is married to Sarada and has a son named Rajat Anil.
