= K. K. Rajeev =

Indian film director

K. K. Rajeev is a director from the Malayalam television industry.

== Career ==
His most famous serials are Peythozhiyathe, Venal Mazha, Swapnam, Avicharitham, Amma Manassu, Kudumbayogam, Orma, Mazhayariyathe, Kadhayile Rajakumari, Oru Penninte Kadha and Eshwaran Sakshiyayi. In 2009, Rajeev produced a TV serial based on the late writer and director Padmarajan's famous work Vadakaku oru Hridayam. The script for the serial has been written by Padmarajan's son Ananthapadmanaphan. In his career as a film director, he won many awards which includes the state award he won for directing Avicharitam telecasted in Asianet.His debut film in Malayalam cinema is Njanum Ente Familiyum, which was released in 2012.

== Biography ==
During his school and college days he was active in acting in and directing plays of well known writers. A writer himself, he wrote short plays and direct it to present in school/college competitions. He won prizes for acting and direction. When he was an undergraduate commerce student in M S M College, Kayamkulam, his team participated in the Kerala University Youth festival drama competition and KK Rajeev won the 'Best Actor of the Year' award. He was the Arts Club Secretary of the college, in 1985. He is married to Honey Rajeev and the couple has a son, Vishnu Rajeev who is married to a Lithuanian, Gabija Rasciauskaite. The couple are residents of Lithuania.

== Television soap operas ==
Year	Title	Channel	Lead Actors	Notes
2001	Venalmazha	Surya TV	Srividya, Poornima Indrajith, Ratheesh	
2002	Peythozhiyathe	Surya TV	Thilakan, Poornima Indrajith, Mallika Sukumaran	
2003-2004	Swapnam	Asianet	Prem Prakash, Srividya, Praveena, Suresh Krishna, Anoop Menon	
2004	Avicharitham	Asianet	Prem Prakash, Srividya, Jayan Cherthala, Suvarna Mathew, Valsala Menon	
2005	Orma	Asianet	Suresh Krishna, Priya Raman, Sanusha, Urmila Unni	
2006-2007	Amma Manassu	Asianet	Sanusha, Krishna, Vanitha Krishnachandran, Sreekala Sasidharan, Chipy	
2008	January	Asianet	Suvarna Mathew, Harsha	
2008	Kudumbayogam	Surya TV	Shaalin Zoya, Meera Krishna	
2009	Aagneyam	DD Malayalam	Prem Prakash, Meera Krishna, Souparnika Subash	
2009	Vadakkaikku Oru Hridayam	Amrita TV	Shalu Menon, Kavitha Nair, V.K.Baiju, Jayan Cherthala, Sreelatha Namboothiri	remake of Vadakakku Oru Hridayam
2009	Mazhayariyathe	Surya TV	Anitha Peter, Dhileep Rajan, Praveena, Yadhu Krishnan	
2011	Kadhayile Rajakumari	Mazhavil Manorama	Kishor Satya, Leena Nair, Surabhi Lakshmi	
2013	Oru Penninte Kadha	Mazhavil Manorama	Prem Prakash, Sreelakshmi, Indu Thampy, Yadhu Krishnan	
2013	Avalude Kadha	Surya TV	Prem Prakash, Sreelakshmi, Indu Thampy, Yadhu Krishnan	Sequel to Oru Penninte Kadha
2014	Amma Manasam	Surya TV	Sreelakshmi, Sini Varghis, Akash V H, Deepa	Remake of Tamil serial Azhagi
2015	Eshwaran Saakshiyayi	Flowers TV	Prem Prakash, Sreelakshmi, Reena, Divyaprabha, Akash V H, Rakendu	
2016	Pokkuveyil (TV series)	Flowers TV	Krishna, Sruthi Lakshmi, Yadhu Krishnan, Aji John, Reena Basheer	
2017 -2018	Ayalathe Sundari	Surya TV	Yadhu Krishnan, Kavitha Nair, Mersheena Neenu, Akash V H, Jyothika, Aji John	
2019-2020	Thonnyaksharangal	Amrita TV	Yadhu Krishnan, Kavitha Nair, Mersheena Neenu	
2020 -2021	Anna Kareena	Flowers TV	Thomaskutty, Catherine, Parvathy, David John	
2021-2022	Pranayavarnangal	Zee Keralam	Richard N. J., Swathy Nithyanand, Divyadarshan, Ameya Nair, Jismy	Remake of Bengali series Ki Kore Bolbo Tomay
2023	Anuraga Ganam Pole	Zee Keralam	Kavitha Nair, Prince, Nitha Promy, Balachandran Chullikadu, Thomaskutty, Jaseela Parveen	Remake of Hindi series Bade Achhe Lagte Hain
2025-Present	Peythozhiyathe (Note: Not related to 2002 series of same name)	Surya TV	Krishnendhu Unnikrishnan, Thej Gowda, Mukundan Menon, Uma Nair, Aswathy, Jayachandran Thonnakkal	Remake of Tamil series Annam

== Filmography ==
- Njanum Ente Familiyum (2012)
- Evidey (2019)

== Awards ==
Kerala State Television Awards

- 2005 -Best Serial -Avicharitham
- 2005-Best Director -Avicharitham
- 2010 - Best Serial - Agneyam
- 2010-Best Director - Agneyam
- 2015-Best Serial - Eshwaran Saakshiyayi
- 2016-Best Serial - Pokkuveyil
- 2021 - Special Jury - Anna Kareena

Asianet Television Awards

- 2005-Best Serial- Swapnam
- 2005-Best Director- Avicharitham
- 2006-Best Serial- Orma
- 2006-Best Director -Orma

Atlas-Film Critics award

- 2009-Best Serial -Agneyam

Kaveri Film critics Awards

- 2004-Best Serial - Avicharitham
- 2004-Best Director - Avicharitham

FLOWERS TV AWARDS

- 2016 - Best Director - Eshwaran Saakshiyayi
- 2016 -Best Serial -Eshwaran Saakshiyayi

== See also ==
- Malayalam cinema
