= Kavitha Nair =

Indian television presenter

- Occupations: Television presenter; actor; model; writer; blogger
- Years active: 2002–present
- Spouse: Vipin
- Awards: Kerala State Television Award for Best Actress (2019)

Kavitha Nair is an Indian television presenter, actor, model, writer and blogger. She won the 2019 Kerala State Television Award for Best Actress for her performance in Thonnyaksharangal.

== Personal life ==
Nair is from Kottayam and attended Baker Memorial Girls High School in Kottayam. She is married to Vipin and lives in Bengaluru.

== Biography ==
Nair started her career as a host with the TV show Ponpulari on Surya TV and went on to host several popular shows and award nights establishing herself as one of the best Television anchors in Malayalam. Meanwhile, she did a few TV serials of which her notable works include Vadakakkoru Hridayam, Ayalathe Sundari and Thonnyaksharangal all directed by K.K. Rajeev.

She has written Sundarapathanangal, a compilation of 20 Malayalam short stories written in a span of three years. The preface has been written by Mohanlal.

She has acted in Malayalam films Mampazhakkalam, Hotel California, And the Oscar goes to, 10 Kalpanakal, Daffedar and Elam.

== Television ==
=== TV serials ===
List of Kavitha Nair television serials credits
Year	Show	Role	Channel	Notes
2006	Kaliveedu	Menaka's sister	Surya TV	
2007	Nombarappoovu	Anitha	Asianet	
2007	Lakshyam		Asianet	
2007	Minnal Kesari		Surya TV	
2007	Velankanni Mathavu		Surya TV	
2007 - 2008	Sandhyalekshmi	Alice	DD Malayalam	
2008	Aparichitha		DD Malayalam	
2009	Sree Mahabhagavatham	Chithralekha	Asianet	
2007‍–‍2009	Rahasyam	Priyamvada IPS	Asianet	
2009‍–‍2010	Vigraham	Priya	Asianet	
2009	Vadakakku Oru Hridayam	Ashwathy	Amrita TV	
2009‍–‍2012	Autograph		Asianet	
2010	Lipstick	Gopika	Asianet	
2011	Suryakanthi		Jaihind TV	
2011	Ividam Swargamanu	Bhadra/Vakkeelamma	Surya TV	
2011	Swamiye Saranamayyappa	Subhadra	Surya TV	
2012	Sree Padmanabham	Thamburatty	Amrita TV	
2012	Butterflies		Surya TV	
2017‍–‍2018	Ayalathe Sundari	Kavyalakshmi	Surya TV	
2018	Police		ACV	
2019	Thonnyaksharangal	Ancy Varghese	Amrita TV	Won–Kerala State Television Award for Best Actress
2020‍–‍2021	Nandanam	Janaki	Flowers TV	
2020‍–‍2021	Namam Japikunna Veedu	Radha Varma	Mazhavil Manorama	
2023‍–‍2024	Anuraga Ganam Pole	Sumitha Chandran (Sumi)	Zee Keralam	
2025–present	Krishnagaadha	Sithara Sreenivas	Zee Keralam	

=== TV shows ===
List of Kavitha Nair television shows credits
Show	Role	Channel	Notes
Ponpulari	Anchor	Surya TV	
Ningalkkariyamo	Anchor	Surya TV	Phone in program
Tharolsavam	Host	Kairali TV	Season 1–3
Nakshtradeepangal	Host	Kairali TV	
Manimelam	Co-Host	Kairali TV	With Kalabhavan Mani
Symphony	Host	Surya TV	
Oru Vattam Koodi	Host	Kerala Vision	
My Fitness	Host	Kerala Vision	
Silk Route	Host	Flowers TV	
Aarppo Eerro	Host	Kairali TV	
Gandharva Sangeetham	Host	Kairali TV	
Puthiya Geethnagal	Host	Asianet	
Makante Amma	Host	Asianet	
Atma Suryotsavam	Host	Surya TV	
Suryathejassode Amma	Host	Surya TV	
Shubharathri	Host	Jeevan TV	
Cinema News	Host		
Priya Mohanam		Janam TV	
E Reporter		Reporter TV	
Asianet TV Awards	Host	Asianet	
Nammal Thammil	herself	Asianet	
Youth Club			
Nammude Tharam			
Cine Talkies			
Star Singer	Guest	Asianet	
Sreekandan Nair Show	Guest	Surya TV	
Ee Onam Lalettanodoppam	Host		
Star Chat	Host	Kairali News	
Entertainment News		Asianet News	
Varthaprabhatham		Asianet News	
Annies Kitchen	Guest	Amrita TV	
Ennishtam	Guest	ACV	
Ruchibhedham		ACV	
Morning Show		Mathrubhumi News	
Parayam Nedam	Guest	Amrita TV	

== Filmography ==
List of film credits
Year	Title	Role	Notes
2004	Mampazhakkalam	Sivan's wife	
2005	Kochi Rajavu	Meenakshi's friend	
2006	Ennittum	College student	
2008	Kurukshetra	Swaminathan's wife	
2010	Upadeshiyude Makan	Ammini	
2011	Swapna Sanchari	Deepa Raveendran	
2013	Hotel California	Actress	
2013	For Hire	Prostitute	Short film
2013	Silence	Advocate	
2014	Balyakalasakhi	Suhara's mother	
2014	Konthayum Poonoolum	Annie	
2014	Apothecary	Sabira Usman	
2014	Lal Bahadur Shastri	Teacher	
2016	Daffedar	Subhadra	
2016	Leela	Usha	
2016	10 Kalpanakal	Angel's mother	
2017	Honey Bee 2: Celebrations	Lisamma	
2017	Honey Bee 2.5	Lisamma/Herself	
2019	And the Oscar Goes To...	Seetha	
2019	Ilayaraja	School Manager	
2020	Eelam	Bar lady	OTT release
