= Kerala State Television Award for Best Actress =

Annual Indian television award

Kerala State Television Awards for Best Actress
- State award for contributions to Malayalam television
- Awarded for: Best performance by an actress in a leading role
- Sponsored by: Kerala State Chalachitra Academy
- First award: 1991
- Final award: 2024
- Most recent winner: Sreedhanya

Highlights
- Most awards: Shanthi Krishna (3)
- Total awarded: 34
- First winner: Zeenath
- Website: www.keralafilm.com

The Kerala State Television Award for Best Actress is presented annually at the Kerala State Television Awards of India to an actress for the best performance in a leading role in a Malayalam telefilm or serial. Until 1997, the awards were managed directly by the Department of Cultural Affairs, Government of Kerala. Since 1998, the Kerala State Chalachitra Academy, an autonomous non-profit organisation functioning under the Department of Cultural Affairs, has been exercising control over the awards. The 2016 ceremony was the only occasion when there was a tie between two nominees for the category; Shafna and Sruthi Lakshmi shared the award for their performances in Sahayathrika and Pokuveyil, respectively.

== Winners ==
Year	Recipient(s)	Tele film / serial(s)	Notes	Ref
1991	Zeenath	Poovan Pazham	Teleserial of DD Keralam	
1992	Shanthi Krishna	Mohapakshikal	Teleserial of DD Keralam	
1993	Kukku Parameshwaran	Uyarthezhunelp	Teleserial of DD Keralam	
1994	Shanthi Krishna	Seemanthan	Teleserial of DD Keralam	
1995	Shanthi Krishna	Scooter	Teleserial of DD Keralam	
1996	Beena Antony	Miss Mery Theresa Paul, Charulatha	Teleserials of DD Keralam	
1997	Sreelakshmi	Maranam Durbalam	Teleserial of DD Keralam	
1998	Bindhu Ramakrishnan	Thottangal	Teleserial of DD Keralam	
1999	Anila Sreekumar	Draupadi	Teleserial of DD Keralam	
2000	Thara Kalyan	Nanthuni; Manalnagaram	Teleserials of DD Keralam	
2001	Jyothirmayi	Avasthatarangal	Teleserial of Surya TV	
2002	Kaveri	Anna	Teleserial of Kairali TV	
2003	Sharika Menon	Ninakai	Teleserial of Kairali TV	
2004	Srividya	Avicharitham	Teleserial of Asianet	
2005	Ambili Devi	Amma	Teleserial of Kairali TV	
2006	Shelly Kishore	Thaniye	Teleserial of Amrita TV	
2007	Meera Vasudev	Kanalpoovu	Teleserial of Jeevan TV	
2008	Lena	Aranazhikaneram	Teleserial of Amrita TV	
2009	Meera Krishna	Aagneyam	Teleserial of DD Keralam	
2010	Revathy	Thick-Thick	Censored Telefilm	
2011	Sreelakshmi	Ardhachandrante Rathri	Teleserial of Amrita TV	
2012	Ananya	Doore	Teleserial of Mazhavil Manorama	
2013	Sreekala	Makeup	Censored Telefilm	
2014	Seema G. Nair	Moksham	Censored Telefim	
2015	Janaki Nair	River Life	Censored Telefilm	
2016	Shafna	Sahayathrika	Teleserial of Surya TV	
2016	Sruthi Lakshmi	Pokkuveyil	Teleserial of Flowers TV	
2017	Amala Gireeshan	Neermathalam	Teleserial of Asianet	
2018	Seena Antony	Devangana	Teleserial of Amrita TV	
2019	Kavitha Nair	Thonnyaksharangal	Teleserial of Amrita TV	
2020	Aswathy Sreekanth	Chakkappazham	Teleserial of Flowers TV	
2021	Katherine	Anna Kareena	Teleserial of Flowers TV	
2022	P.V. Shishira	Samaram	Teleserial of DD Keralam	
2023	Riya Kuriakose	Aanpirannol	Teleserial of Amrita TV	
2023	Mariam Shanoob	Lilly	Short Film	
2024	Sreedhanya	Mazhayethum Mumpe	Teleserial of Amrita TV	

== See also ==
- List of Asian television awards
