= Thara Kalyan =

Indian actress and dancer

- Born: Thara; Thiruvananthapuram, Kerala, India
- Occupations: Actress; dancer; choreographer
- Years active: 1986–present
- Spouse: Rajaram (died 2017)
- Parents: Kalyanakrishnan; Subbalakshmi

Thara Kalyan is an Indian classical dancer and actress in mainstream Malayalam Television and Cinema. She is also a professional dancer in Bharatanatyam, Mohiniyattam, and Kuchipudi.She is an 'A top' Mohiniyattam artist of Doordarshan.

She is the first among the creative Mohiniyattam dancers to have incorporated famous poems as subject and themes for her performances like Amma (O. N. V. Kurup), Karuna (Kumaran Asan), Bhoothappaattu, Yashodhara, Anarkali has been some of her appreciated works in Mohiniyattam. Her recent work is of Thaathri Kutty which is first ever in the history of Mohiniyattam to portray the iron lady who was bold enough to raise her voice rebelling against the chauvenits. She is successfully running a dance institution in Trivandrum.

== Personal life ==
Thara Kalyan was born in a Kerala Iyer family to Kalyanakrishnan and Subbalakshmi, a supporting actresses in Malayalam film industry. Her husband, Rajaram was also a supporting actor who played minor roles in television serials, and was a city local TV channel programme editor & local stage show choreographer. In 2017 her husband died due to multiple organ failure. Her only daughter Sowbhagya Venkitesh married Arjun Somashekharan in 2020. Her mother died in 2023.

== Filmography ==
as an actress

- Jamalinte Punchiri (2024) as Headmistress
- Kabeerinte Divasangal
- Next Token Number
- August 27 (2023) as Prameela
- Run Kalyani (2022) as
- Lucifer (2019) as Local guardian
- Thattumpurath Achuthan (2018) as Nirmala
- Nithyahairtha Kamukan (2018)
- Thanaha (2018) as Subhadrakutty
- Sukhamano Daveede (2018) as Daveed's mother
- Pokkiri Simon (2017) as Sree
- Ezra (2017) as Priya's mother
- Kuttikalundu Sookshikkuka (2016)
- Kattappanayile Rithwik Roshan (2016) as Neethu's relative
- Lord Livingstone 7000 Kandi (2015) as Ananthu's sister
- Ivan Maryadaraman (2015) as Rajalekshmi
- Avarude Veedu
- Haram (2015) as Isha's mother
- Alif (2015) as Hajiyar's wife
- Angels (2014) as Dr.Sandra Mary
- Parankimala (2014) as Narayani
- Pranayakatha (2014) as Reetha's mother
- Rose Guitarinaal (2013) as Joe Alex's mother
- Caribbeans (2013) as Collector Meera Devi
- Thiruvambadi Thamban (2012) as Kanakambal
- Thaskara Lahala (2010) as Doctor
- Ammanilavu (2010) as Nandhini
- April Fool (2010) as Malathi
- Ringtone (2010) as Ammini
- Puthiya Mukham (2009) as Anjana's aunt
- Meghatheertham (2009) as Compere
- Thirakkatha (2008) as Dr. Vasanthi
- Rappakal (2005) as Urmila
- Perumazhakkalam (2004)
- Uthara (2003) as Muthulakshmi
- Januvariyil Pookkunna Rosa (Television movie) - Producer only
- Yudham (2002) (Telefilm)
- Stop Violence (2002) as Adv.Pauly
- Nizhalkkuthu (2002) as Madhavy
- Jeevan Masai (2001) as Vipinan's wife
- Mukha Chithram (1991)
- Nayanangal (1989)
- Marikkunnilla Njan (1988) as Ammini
- Sukhamo Devi (1986)
- Amme Bhagavathi (1986) as Chottanikkara Devi

as a choreographer

- Mayilpeelikkavu (1998)
- Rishivamsham (1999)

== TV serials ==
Year	Title	Role	Channel	Notes
2023-2024	Kaathodu Kaathoram	Prabhavathi	Asianet	
2021	Amma Makal	Akhilandeswari	Zee Keralam	Cameo in promo
2020	Kaiyethum Doorath	Akhilandeswari	Zee Keralam	Cameo in promo
2020-2022	Chembarathi	Thrichambarath Akhilandeswari/ Rajaeshwari	Zee Keralam	(Dual role); Replaced Aishwarya
2019	Chocolate	Kausalya	Surya TV	Replaced by Sharika Menon
2018 –2019	Thenum Vayambum	Parvathy	Surya TV	
2018	Pranayini	Arya	Mazhavil Manorama	
2016	Jagritha	Rahul's Mother	Amrita TV	
2016 – 2017	Krishnathulasi	Padmini a.k.a. Paapammal	Mazhavil Manorama	
2015 – 2017	Karuthamuthu	Mallika	Asianet	Won , Asianet Television Awards 2016 best character actress
2014	Bhagyadevatha	Parameshwari Amma	Mazhavil Manorama	
2013	Aayirathil Oruval		Mazhavil Manorama	
2013	Padasaram		Asianet	
2012	Vrindaavanam	Sheela Gornsalvez	Asianet	
2011	Randamathoraal	Kochammu	Asianet	
2010	Rahasyam		Asianet	
2010	Indraneelam		Surya TV	
2010	Dream City		Surya TV	
2009	Kudumbayogam	Rebecca Luke	Surya TV	
2009	Hello Kuttichathan 2	Bhuvanasundari	Asianet	Main Antagonist
2008	Devi Mahathmyam	Goddess Kali	Asianet	
2008	Meera		Asianet	
2008	Ammathottil		Asianet	
2008	Sandhyalekshmi	Kanaka	Asianet	DD Malayalam
2007 – 2008	Hello Kuttichathan	Bhuvanasundari	Main Antagonist	
2007	Mandaaram	Dr.Merlin	Kairali TV	
2007	Madhavam			Choreography only
2004	Aalippazham		Surya TV	
2004	Kadamattathu Kathanar	Ambika	Asianet	Retelecast in Asianet Plus
2004	Megham		Asianet	
2004	Varam			
2004	Anveshi		Amrita TV	
2003	Sthreejanmam		Surya TV	
2001	Gandharvayamam		Asianet	
2000	Sthree		Asianet	
2000	Manal Nagaram	Esther	DD	Won, Kerala State Television Award for Best Actress
2000	Nandhini		DD	Won, Kerala State Television Award for Best Actress
1990 – 1999	Vettah		DD	
1990 – 1999	Yudham	Ammini	DD	
1990 – 1999	Lakshaarchana		DD	
1990 – 1999	Melottu Kozhiyunna Ilakal		DD	
1990 – 1999	Maya		DD	
1990 – 1999	Sapathnee		DD	
1990 – 1999	Salabhanjika		DD	
1990 – 1999	Gaandharvasandhya		DD	

== Play ==
- Mughaavaranam
- Kayangal

== TV shows ==
Title	Channel	Notes
DD Montage	DD Malayalam	
Snehitha	Amrita TV	
Onnum Onnum Monnu	Mazhavil Manorama	
2 Crore Apple Mega Star	Jeevan TV	
Patturumal	Kairali TV	
Shubhadhinam	Kairali TV	
Pularkkalam	Jeevan TV	
Nammal Thammil	Asianet	
Tharodayam New Face Hunt	Asianet	
Tamaar pataar	Flowers TV	
JB Junction	Kairali TV	
Chaya Koppayile Kodumkattu	Mazhavil Manorama	
Annies Kitchen	Amrita TV	
Comedy Stars	Asianet	
Smart Show	Flowers TV	
Katturumbu	Flowers TV	
Laughing Villa Season 2	Surya TV	
Aram + Arama = Kinnaram	Surya TV	
Sreshtabharatham	Amrita TV	
Red Carpet	Amrita TV	
Panam Tharum Padam	Mazhavil Manorama	
Star Comedy Magic	Flowers TV	
Ammayum Makalum	Amrita TV	
