= Gayathri (Malayalam actress) =

Indian Malayalam film and television actress

Gayathri Varsha
- Born: Kottayam, Kerala, India
- Occupation: Actress
- Years active: 1994–present

Gayathri Varsha is an Indian actress.

== Filmography ==
Year	Title	Role	Notes
1994	CID Unnikrishnan B.A., B.Ed.	Uma	
1994	Vardhakya Puranam	Jayanthi	
1995	Kokkarakko	Vatsala, Kunju's sister	
1995	Parvathy Parinayam	Lathika	
1995	Sargavasantham	Mini	
1995	Aadalla Majaka		Telugu
1995	Mazhavilkoodaram	Binu's friend	
1996	Dilliwala Rajakumaran	Ambujam	
1996	Swarna Kireedam	Ayisha	
1996	Man of the Match	Sonia's friend	
1997	Poothumbiyum Poovalanmarum	Subhadra	
1997	Gajaraja Manthram	Vineetha's friend	
1997	Suvarna Simhaasanam	Girija	
1997	Ranger	Anjali	
1997	Newspaper Boy	Shyamala	
1998	Aaghosham	Mercy	
1998	Punjabi House	Pooja's kin	
1998	Amma Ammaayiyamma	Rekha	
1998	Kanmadam	Vishwanathan's half-sister	
1999	Pathram	Aswathy	
1999	Aayiram Meni	Appu's mother	
1999	Panchapaandavar	Raji	
2000	Sahayathrikakku Snehapoorvam	Mathachan's wife	
2002	Meesa Madhavan	Sarasu	
2002	Nandanam	Sakundala	
2002	Pranayamanithooval	Nadathara Kanakam	
2003	Sadanandante Samayam	Gopinathan's wife	
2003	Ivar	Jacob Mathew's wife	
2003	Ente Veedu Appuvinteyum	Teacher	
2004	Vajram	Lady locked with Avarachan	
2004	Sasneham Sumithra	Devaki Gopalan	
2004	Koottu	College lecturer	
2004	Thalamelam	Dasan's wife	
2005	Hariharan Pillai Happy Aanu	Contractor's wife	
2005	Krithyam	Sandra's mother	
2005	Maanikyan	Thulasi	
2006	Vaasthavam	Politician	
2006	Kalabham	Parthasarathy's mother	
2006	Oruvan	Janu	
2006	Red Salute	Sulochana Karunan	
2007	Chocolate	Lecturer Ambily	
2007	Nasrani	Politician	
2007	Payum Puli	Ramanathan's wife	
2007	Rakshakan	Sarasu	
2008	Thalappavu	Jaanu	
2008	Sound of Boot	Advocate	
2009	My Big Father	Nurse	
2009	Colours	Nurse	
2010	T. D. Dasan Std. VI B	Mercy	
2010	3 Char Sau Bees	Reshma	
2010	Nalla Pattukare	Anasooya	
2011	Three Kings	Kid's mother	
2011	Mohabbath	College lecturer	
2011	Aan Piranna Veedu		
2011	White & Black		
2012	Simhasanam	Bhargavan Unni's wife	
2012	Friday	Muneer's mother	
2012	Face to Face	Radhika Velayudhan	
2012	Da Thadiya	Rosemol	
2012	Karmayodha	Devika's mother	
2012	Grandmaster	Jerome's mother	
2012	Asuravithu	Bhabhi/Teacher	
2013	Nadodimannan	Padamanaban's sister	
2013	Abhiyum Njanum	Jose's wife	
2013	Romans	Thommichan's wife	
2013	D Company	Indumathi's mother	Segment:Oru Bolivian Diary
2013	Players	Urmila	
2014	Salaam Kashmier	Ramani	
2014	7th Day	Lady at car parking area	
2014	Actually	Priya's mother	
2014	Avatharam	Vatsala's mother	
2014	Chakkaramambhazham	Sreedevi	
2015	Thinkal Muthal Velli Vare	Herself	
2015	Aval Vannathinu Shesham		
2015	Jamna Pyari	George's wife	
2016	Hallelooya	Kunjamma	
2016	Dooram	Annmaria's mother	
2017	Aakashamittayee	Teacher	
2017	Georgettan's Pooram	Merlin's mother	
2018	Mangalyam Thanthunanena	Korah's wife	
2018	Joseph	Renuka's mother	
2018	Nithyaharitha Nayakan	Haritha's mother	
2019	Vijay Superum Pournamiyum	Grandma's daughter	Cameo Appearance
2021	Aneetta	Sarasu	Short film
2022	God Bless You	Servant	

== Television career ==
=== Acting credits ===
Telefilms

- Nanmayude Nakshathrangal (Kairali TV)
- Monoottante Onam (Surya TV)

TV serials

Year	Title	Channel
Untelecasted	Athithi	Surya TV
2023-2024	Sudhamani Superaa	Zee Keralam
2022–2023	Sasneham	Asianet
2022–2023	Thoovalsparsham	Asianet
2022	Kanakanmani	Surya TV
2021–2022	Amma Makal	Zee Keralam
2021	Swantham Sujatha	Surya TV
2020–2021	Namam Japikunna Veedu	Mazhavil Manorama
2019–2021	Sumangali Bhava	Zee Keralam
2018	Seetha	Flowers TV
2017–2018	Nokketha Doorath	Mazhavil Manorama
2017	Decemberile Aakasham	Amrita TV
2016	Pokkuveyil	Flowers TV
2016	Anamika	Amrita TV
2016	Sthreethvam	Surya TV
2015	Snehajalakam	Surya TV
2014	Balamani	Mazhavil Manorama
2014–2015	Manjuthirum Mumpe	DD Malayalam
2013	Abhinethri	Surya TV
2012–2016	Sthreedhanam	Asianet
2012	Agniputhri	Asianet
2010–2011	Rudraveena	Surya TV
2010	Parayi Petta Panthirukulam	Surya TV
2010	Gajarajan Guruayoor Keshavan	Surya TV
2010	Bhadra	Surya TV
2009	Adhiparasakthi	Surya TV
2008	Aalilathali	Asianet
2008	Sree Ayyappanum Vavarum	Surya TV
2007	Swami Ayyappan	Asianet
2007-2008	Chilluvilakku	Surya TV
2007	Priyamanasi	Surya TV
2007	Velanakanni Mathavu	Surya TV
2005	Swaram	Amrita TV
2005	Mounam Nombaram	Kairali TV
2005	Kadamattathu Kathanar	Asianet
2005	Mounam	Surya TV
2003	Mangalyam	Asianet
2001	Durga	
1995	Pennurimai	DD Malayalam

=== Anchor ===
- Sthreeparvam
- Ente Koottu
- Veettamma
- Thararuchi
- Akathalam

=== Contestant/Participant ===
- Smart Show
- Onaradham
- Snehitha
- Comedy Sthreekal
- Celebrity Budget
- Shubharathri
- Nammal Thammil
- Thara Raja Thara Rani
- Tharotsavam
- Annie's Kitchen
- Humorous Talk Show
