= Subbalakshmi =

Indian musician (1936–2023)

- Born: 21 April 1936; Thirunelveli, Madras presidency, India
- Died: 30 November 2023 (aged 87); Thiruvananthapuram, Kerala, India
- Occupations: Actress; music composer
- Years active: 1951–2023
- Spouse: Kalyanakrishnan
- Children: Thara Kalyan

Subbalakshmi (21 April 1936 – 30 November 2023) was an Indian Carnatic musician, composer, and actress who worked in Malayalam, Tamil, Telugu, Kannada, and Hindi cinema. She was noted for her performance in Kalyanaraman (2002), Pandippada (2005), and Nandanam (2002).

== Life and career ==
Subbalakshmi was married to Kalyanakrishnan. The couple had two daughters and one son, including actress Thara Kalyan. Before entering film, Subbalakshmi was a musician and dance instructor at Jawahar Balabhavan and worked at All India Radio beginning in 1951. She is noted for being the first female composer of All India Radio from south India. She performed many concerts, was also a dubbing artist, and acted in some telefilms and albums.

Subbalakshmi died on 30 November 2023, at the age of 87 due to age related ailments.

== Partial filmography ==
=== As actress ===
Malayalam films

- Aarohanam (1980) (Malayalam) Debut
- Nandanam (2002) as Veshamani Ammal as Lead
- Kalyanaraman (2002) as Karthyayyani
- Thilakkam (2003) as Ammu's grandmother
- Gramaphone (2003) as Gregory's wife
- Saudhamini (2003) as Kunjulakshmiyamma
- C.I.D. Moosa (2003) as Meena's grandmother
- Maanikyan (2005) as Ammomma
- Rappakal (2005) as Valiya Varma's Wife
- Pandippada (2005) as Meena's Grandmother
- Classmates (2006) as Special appearance in the song (old lady)
- Note Book (2006)
- Kalabham (2006) as Alamelu Ammal
- Ravanan (2006) as Muthassi
- Romeoo (2007) as Bhama's grandmother
- Ali Bhai (2007) as Old lady in the colony
- Chocolate (2007) as Dance Teacher
- Mulla (2008) as Old lady
- Meghatheertham (2009) as Artist
- Chattambinaadu (2009) as Old lady in village
- Seetha Kalyanam (2009) as Abhirami's grandmother
- Yugapurushan (2010) as Antharjanam
- Marykkundoru Kunjaadu (2010) as Bus Passenger
- Neelambari (2010) as Paatti
- Note Out (2011) as Maya's grandmother
- Lakshmi Vilasam Renuka Makan Raghuram (2012) as Old woman
- Thalsamayam Oru Penkutty (2012) as TV Audient
- Load Shedding (2013) as Ravi's mother
- Oru Yathrayil (2013) – {Segment : I Love Appa} as Paatti
- Sound Thoma (2013) as Seller
- Swaasam (2013) as Meera's grandmother
- Koothara (2014) as Koobrin's Valyammachi
- Pranayakatha (2014) as Reetha's grandmother
- Avarude Veedu (2014) as Old lady
- Nakshathrangal (2014) as Madhaviyamma
- 69 (2014) as Grandmother
- Murukku (2014) as Lady
- Chirakodinja Kinavukal (2015) as Old lady
- Rudrasimhasanam (2015) as Grandmother
- Oru New Generation Pani (2015) as Rachana's paatti
- Rani Padmini (2015) as Rani's grandmother
- Ivan Maryadaraman (2015) as Old guest
- Aakashavani (2016) as Vani's grandmother
- 1948 Kaalam Paranjathu (2019) as Antharjanam
- Jack & Daniel (2019) as Muthassi
- Therottam (2019)
- One (2021) as Ramya's grandmother
- Star (2021) as Devi Muthassi
- Boomerang (2023) as Sandra
- Cherukkanum Pennum (2025) as Balu's grandmother
- Pachathappu as Meenakshiyamma
- Chakkarappazham
- Oru Vaathil Kotta
- Kaakan
- Mallanum Mathevanum
- Ente Jeevitha Nombaram (2026)

Telugu films

- Kalyana Ramudu (2003) as Karthyayyani
- Ye Maaya Chesave (2010) as Jessie's Grandmother

Hindi films

- Jagat Jogini Maa Khodiyar (2006) as Mamaniya's wife
- Ekk Deewana Tha (2012) as Jessie's Grandmother
- Dil Bechara (2020) as Manny's grandmother
- The Kerala Story (2023) as Shalini's grandmother

Tamil films

- Oru Ponnu Oru Paiyan (2007) as Viswanathan's sister
- Raman Thediya Seethai (2008) as Gayathri's paatti
- Vinnaithaandi Varuvaayaa (2010) as Jessie's grandmother
- Ore Oru Raja Mokkaraja (2015) as Paatti
- Ammani (2016) as Ammani (Title role)
- House Owner (2019) as Radha's grandmother
- Beast (2022) as hostage

Kannada films

- Honganasu (2008) (Kannada)

Sanskrit films

- Madhurasmitham

English film

- In the Name of God

== As voice artist ==
- Jack & Daniel (2019) – Old lady passenger in the road
- Ozhimuri (2012)
- Rock n' Roll (2007) – Chandramouli's mother (Vanitha Krishnachandran) – Song bit

=== As playback singer ===
- "Entadukke Vannadukkum" - Marykkundoru Kunjaadu (2010)
- "Title song"- Ozhimuri (2012)
- "Kanne Kannare" - Rudra Simhasanam (2015)
- "Mazhai Ingillaye" - Ammani (2016)
- "Super Sundaran" - Jimmy Ee Veedinte Aishwaryam (2019)
- Peythoriyathe

== Television serials ==
Appeared in more than 65 TV Serials

Malayalam serials

- Valayam (DD Malayalam)
- Gandharvayamam (DD Malayalam)
- Ramettan (DD Malayalam)
- Kudumbasametham Manikutty (Jaihind TV)
- Kathanar Kadamattathu Kathanar (Jaihind TV)
- Kudumbapuranam (Jaihind TV)
- Bhagyalakshmi (Surya TV)
- Velankani Mathavu (Surya TV)
- Sreeguruvaayoorappan (Surya TV)
- Kuttichathan (Surya TV)
- Dream City (Surya TV)
- Snehakkoodu (Surya TV)
- Ishtam (Surya TV)
- Amme Mahamaye (Surya TV)
- Sahayathrika (Surya TV)
- Thenum Vayambum (Surya TV)
- Ente Maathavu (Surya TV)
- Kunjikkoonan (Asianet)
- Swami Ayyapan (Asianet)
- Sreemahabhagavatham (Asianet)
- Devi Mahathmyam (Asianet)
- Amma (Asianet)
- Kadamattathu Kathanar (Asianet)
- Seetha Kalyanam (Asianet)
- Njangal Santhushtarannu (Asianet Plus)
- Manasu Parayunna Karyangal (Mazhavil Manorama)
- Aayirathil Oruval (Mazhavil Manorama)
- Oru Penninte Katha (Mazhavil Manorama)
- Aniyathi (Mazhavil Manorama)
- Sooryakaladi (Amrita TV)
- Mahaguru (Kaumudy TV)
- {Telefilm} (Kairali TV)
- Sudhamani Superaa (Zee Keralam)
- Patharamattu (Promo appearance) (Asianet)

Tamil serials

- Perazhagi (Colors Tamil)
- Bharatidasan Colony (Star Vijay)

== Television, radio and online shows ==
- Comedy Thillana (Kairali TV)
- Ammamrude Samsthana Sammelanam (Flowers)
- Panam Tharum Padam (Mazhavil Manorama)
- Annies Kitchen (Amrita TV)
- Bhavad Navarathri (Amrita TV)
- Humorous Talk Show Asianet Plus
- Katha Ithuvare (Mazhavil Manorama)
- Sreekandan Nair Show (Surya TV)
- Varthaprabhatham (Asianet News)
- Ladies Hour (Kaumudy TV)
- Sundari Neeyum Sundaran Njanum (Asianet)
- Laughing Villa Season 2 (Surya TV) as Muthassi
- Dr.Lakshmi Nairum Adukkalayil Ninnu Arangathekku (Kairali TV)
- Celebrity's Kitchen (Kairali TV)
- D2 (Mazhavil Manorama)
- Onnum Onnum Moonu (Mazhavil Manorama)
- Sangeethika (DD Malayalam)
- Malayali Darbar (Amrita TV)
- Annorikkal (Manorama News)
- Tharattu (Kairali TV)
- JB Junction (Kairali TV)
- Prabhatha Kairali (Kairali TV)
- Asianet TV Awards (Asianet)
- Comedy Stars (Asianet)
- Comedy Super Nite 2 (Flowers)
- Chembai Festival (DD Malayalam)
- Red FM Malayalam Music Awards 2018 (Surya TV)
- Golden Years of Doordarshan (DD Malayalam)
- Samdooram (DD Malayalam)
- Salt and Pepper (Kaumudy TV)
- Red Carpet (Amrita TV)
- Ammayum Makalum (Amrita TV)
- Star Comedy Magic (Flowers)
- Comedy Nights
- Ladies Band
- Ormmayile Vishu
- Comedy Sthreekal
- Ormayile Ponnonam
- Zee Malayalam News
- Behindwoods Ice
- Amma Bharatham
- Lakshmi Ramakrishnan Channel
- Sowbhagya Venkitesh YouTube Channel
- Thara Kalyan YouTube Channel
- Dr. Vazhamuttam Chandrababu YouTube Channel
- Shinelal Kalagramam YouTube Channel
- Waves of Kerala

== Advertisements ==
Appeared in more than 65 advertisements

- Lays
- Horlicks
- Grandmas
- Popy
- Tanishq Kolam
- Atham Pathu Ruchi
- Kalyan Jewellers
- Nerolac Paints
- Moon Beauty Parlour
- Swagath Kalyana Mandapam
- Ammaveedu
- Surf Excel Quick Wash
- Vanitha
- Mandharakkavu
- Colgate

== Albums ==
- ThulasimanamFeatures
