= T. D. Dasan Std. VI B =

2010 Malayalam film

- Directed by: Mohan Raghavan
- Written by: Mohan Raghavan
- Produced by: Paul Vadukumcherry; Paul Valikodath
- Starring: Master Alexander; Biju Menon; Jagadish; Shwetha Menon
- Cinematography: Arun Varma
- Edited by: Vinod Sukumaran
- Music by: Sreevalsan J. Menon
- Production company: Chithranjali
- Distributed by: Presta De Lexa Moviedom Release
- Release date: 9 April 2010
- Running time: 102 minutes
- Country: India
- Language: Malayalam

T. D. Dasan Std. VI B is a 2010 Indian Malayalam-language film written and directed by Mohan Raghavan and produced by Paul Vadukumcherry. The film deals with a child's desire to meet his father, beginning when he finds a clue in a piece of paper in his mother's trunk. The wanderings of the boy's mind and the real unraveling of the world, which is a mix of dreams, desires, and reality, are portrayed in the movie.

The film features Master Alexander, Biju Menon, Jagadish and Shwetha Menon in the lead roles. Master Alexander won the Best Child Actor award in an online poll conducted by The Times of India. The film opened in Kerala theatres on 9 April 2010 to universal acclaim. It was screened at various international film festivals and has garnered several awards. Despite all the acclaim, the film performed poorly at the box office.

T. D. Dasan Std. VI B was the only film directed by Mohan Raghavan who died a year after the release of the film.

== Plot ==
T. D. Dasan is a young boy who lives with his mother. His father had left them years back when Dasan was a year old. Dasan gets his dad's address from his mother's old trunk box and writes him a letter.

Dasan's father had moved out of that address and the letter reaches the current resident Nandakumar Poduval, an Ad film-maker who lives with his thirteen-year-old daughter Ammu in Bangalore. Nandan requests Ammu's caretaker Madhavan to find out the whereabouts of the person and deliver the letter to him. But Madhavan is not that enthusiastic and the letter ends up in the waste bin. Ammu sees this and feels bad about it. She starts writing replies to Dasan, as if they were written to him by his dad. The young boy is excited at the thought of having found his dad, and shares all his feelings and needs with his dad. Ammu promptly replies with pens and other gifts Dasan asked his father.

Later Dasan's mother gets to know this and gets shattered by this news. Nandan also gets to know this news and becomes furious at his daughter, revealing that Dasan's father had actually died months ago while suffering from jaundice. He now wants to meet Dasan, apologize and tell him the truth. Dasan's mother was later found dead under mysterious circumstances. When Nandan comes to meet Dasan, he understands that Dasan is now an orphan, who was now under the care of his uncle Raman Kutty. Dasan meets Nandan, who now sees him as his father. Nandan first thinks of leaving the place without Dasan but changes his mind soon after.

== Cast ==
- Master Alexander as T. D. Dasan
- Tina Rose as Ammu
- Biju Menon as Nandakumar Poduval
- Jagadish as Madhavan
- Shwetha Menon as Chandrika
- Valsala Menon as Ammumma
- Shruthy Menon as Megha
- Jagathy Sreekumar as Menon
- Suresh Krishna as Raman Kutty
- Mala Aravindan as Teacher
- Ottapalam Pappan
- Alosious Panikulangara as Baalu
- Sreehari as Advocate
- Dennis Parakkadan as Vagrant
- Gayathri

== Reception ==
T. D. Dasan Std. VI B had an overwhelmingly positive reception from the critics. Paresh Palicha of Rediff.com said the movie "is miles ahead of the films that are served in the garb of entertainment week after week, and leaves us with a sense of elation. A brilliant effort indeed!" This is what Nowrunning had to say. "Mohan Raghavan's debut film matches up in texture, dimension and depth to the wonderfully crafted films of Walter Salles that often transcend boundaries. This is the work of an artist who refuses to see the medium as a mere commodity, and the highly sensitive writing and truly marvelous direction make this film a captivating watch." Sify.com said "With no loud statements, buffoonery or gimmicks that we usually see in every other film, debutant director Mohan Raghavan's T D Dasan Std VI B' is a little gem that could perhaps shock you with its inherent honesty."

Indiaglitz also had given a glowing review for the movie. Despite the favourable critic opinion, the movie was a non-starter at the box-office. Budget constrains heavily limited the marketing of the movie, with the film ending up as a minuscule release.

The film was one of the two South Indian films screened at the 11th New York Indian Film Festival (NYIFF 2011). The film won the award for the Best Screenplay at the festival. It was an official selection in the competition section for the Asian New Talent Award at the Shanghai International Film Festival.

=== Film festival participation ===
- Chennai International Film Festival
- FILCA Film Festival
- Habitat International Film Festival
- International Film Festival of Kerala
- New York Indian Film Festival
- Pune International Film Festival
- Shanghai International Film Festival

=== Awards ===
Kerala State Film Awards

- Best Debut Director - Mohan Raghavan
- Second Best Actor - Biju Menon

New York Indian Film Festival

- Best Screenplay - Mohan Raghavan

John Abraham Award

- Best Film

Kerala Film Critics Association Awards

- Best Story - Mohan Raghavan
- Best Child Artist-Master Alexander

Asianet Film Awards

- Best Child Artist - Master Alexander

World Malayali Council Awards

- Special Jury Award - Mohan Raghavan

INSPIRE Awards

- Best Debutant Director - Mohan Raghavan
- Best Supporting Actress - Shweta Menon

Amrita-FEFKA Film Awards

- Best Film
- Best Director - Mohan Raghavan
- Best Screen Play- (Mohan Raghavan)
- Best Child Artist-Master Alexander

Jaihind TV Film Awards Kalaignar TV film awards
isaiaruvi film awards

- Best Screenplay (posthumous) - Mohan Raghavan

Mathrubhumi Film Awards

- Best Child Artist - Master Alexander

Times Of India Awards

- Best Child Artist - Master Alexander
