= Thoovalsparsham (TV series) =

Indian television series

- Genre: Drama; Thriller
- Written by: N. Vinu Narayan
- Directed by: Sreejith Pallery
- Starring: Avanthika mohan; Sandra babu
- Country of origin: India
- Original language: Malayalam
- No. of episodes: 429

Production
- Camera setup: Multi-camera
- Running time: 22 minutes
- Production companies: Lens and Shot; Motion Pictures Pvt Ltd

Original release
- Network: Asianet
- Release: 12 July 2021 – 11 February 2023

Related
- Seetha Kalyanam

Thoovalsparsham (transl. Feather Touch) is an Indian Malayalam television series directed by Sreejith Palery. The show premiered on 12 July 2021 on Asianet and is also available on Disney+ Hotstar. It stars Avanthika Mohan and Sandra Babu along with Ajoobsha, Vivek Gopan, Deepan Murali, and Yassar in supporting roles. The show ended abruptly on 11 February 2023.

== Plot ==
Shreya and Malavika are two sisters who were separated during childhood after their mother Nandini was killed. Malu was kidnapped by a man who raised her because he and his wife has no children. Malu was grown up by the name Thumbi. After they grew up, Shreya became a police officer and Malu became a Lady Robinhood (who rob from counterfeiters and give it to Poor) who was searching by Shreya. Thumbi has a lover who is the person who knows she is a robber. He is a doctor, Arun. He is an orphan who lived in Thumbi's village. Thumbi is the sponsor of Arun. Arun's inmate realized Thumbi is a lady robinhood who is searching by police. Avinash who loved Shreya proposed to her and she refused it by saying that she will get married only if she gets back her younger sister Malu. Shreya try to trap lady Robinhood with help of Avinash. Avinash and Sahadevan (Shreya's father) trap Thumbi and threaten her and ask her to act as Malu. Yielded to threat, Thumbi acts as Malu. Avinash's family and Shreya's family decided their marriage. On the engagement day, Malu and Pavithra (Avinash's ex -girlfriend) planned to destroy the engagement. Thumbi's father Sukumaran Thampi become hospitalized due to cardiac arrest by hearing his own sister planning to kill Malu for getting a property. This time Thumbi realize she is the real Malu and started loving her relatives truly. At the time Shreya continued searching for lady robinhood. She knows Arun has a role in this robbery. So that she questioned Arun this time roommate of Arun revealed that Malu or Thumbi is the lady Robinhood. Shreya made this disclosure in high secret as her superior officer Easwar Raj who is a counterfeiter will kill Malu after knowing she is the robber. Because she has robbed his counterfeit money. When she is arrested and presented in court if she reveals his counterfeit money Easwar Raj also become jailed. But spies of Easwar in her station report to Easwar. Meanwhile, Easwar self took the charge of lady Robinhood case investigation. He arranged a team of police to the house where Shreya and Malu lived. In this team, an officer who is loyal to Shreya informs her of the thing. Malu doesn't know that Shreya realized she is the robber and arrest against she is moving on. Shreya is trying to save Malu. Unfortunately, Easwar Raj arrived there and started to arrest Malu on the case which Shreya made to trap lady Robinhood. This time Shreya's friend Ann Mary who is a reporter working on a News channel arrived and shot Easwar arresting her camera and shot them on the way for Malu's protection. Reaching the police station Malu apologizes to Shreya and Shreya accepted it. Shreya asked Avinash to withdraw the case against Malu. Avinash used the chance. He said it isn't possible. Because she planned to destroy their engagement. He asked Shreya to give a promise for their marriage. She gave it and rescued Malu.

After this Malu's father opened his eyes. Shreya talked about Arun and Malu's relationship with Sukumaran Thampi and their marriage is fixed.

== Cast ==
=== Main ===
- Sandra Babu as Malavika "Malu" Nandini / Thumbi a.k.a. Lady Robinhood: Nandini and Sukumaran Thampi's illegitimate daughter; Shreya's half-sister; Subbaya and Cheeru'a adopted daughter; Arun's lover. (2021–2023)
- Avanthika Mohan as SP Shreya Nandini IPS: Nandini and Sahadevan's daughter; Malu's half sister. (2021–2023)
- Ajoobsha as Dr. Arun Kumar a.k.a. Kochu Doctor: Malu's childhood friend and lover. (2021–2023)
- Vivek Gopan as Adv. Nidhin Narendran a.k.a. Nari (2023)
- Bincy Joseph as Aleena

=== Recurring ===
- Deepan Murali as Avinash Varma: Karunakara Varma and Sumithra son; Shreya's ex-fiancée; Pavithra's husband.
- Yassar as Vivek Menon / Walter: A journalist; Vineetha's brother.
- Prabha Shankar as Sahadevan: Shreya's father
- Anand Thrissur as Sukumaran Thampi: Malu's biological father
- Yavanika Gopalakrishnan as Peethambaran: Sahadevan and Saudamini's father
- Karthika Kannan as Saudhamini: Shreya's aunt and Sahadevan's sister
- Catherine Reji / Della George as Pavithra: Sukumaran Thampi's Niece and Avinash's wife
- Balachandran Chullikkadu as Karunakara Varma: Avinash's father
- Archana Menon / Gayathri Varsha as Sumithra Varma: Karunakara Varma's wife; Avinash and Aavani's mother
- Omana Ouseph / Kalady Omana as Ammini: Sahadevan and Saudamini's mother
- Rajkumar Rajasekhar as Commissioner Eashwar Raja IPS
- Sona Sunil as Vismaya (Vichu)
- Sini Varghese as Vineetha: Vismaya's mother
- Naveen Kumar as CI Naveen
- Santhosh Kurup as Retd.Colonel Rajasekhar
- Ashraf Pezhumoodu as Retd. SI Chacko: Shreya's assistant
- Breshnev Syam as Subbayya: Thumbi's foster father
- Lakshmi Sanal as Cheeru: Thumbi's foster mother
- Kalabhavan Nandana as Aavani Varma: Avinash's younger sister
- Sindhu Jacob as Mother superior
- Laljith as Jackson: Eeswar Raja's friend
- Kris Venugopal as Parakkal Ramdas
- Blessy Kurien / Neeraja Pillai as Ann Mathews: Shreya's friend and TV reporter
- Sadhika Venugopal as Nandhini: Shreya and Malu's late mother
- Kollam Shah as Dharmendra
- Akash Murali as Harshan: Thumbi's target
- Resh Lakshana as Madona
- Sudheer C. K as Ramanunni
- Geetha Nair as Sujatha, Nidhin Narendran's mother

== Reception ==
From its launch onwards the serial is aired from Monday to Friday at 8:30 pm but due to low TRP rating compared to another shows in prime time slot, From 22 November 2021 it started airing at 2:00pm. But due to high TRP rating in afternoon slot, from 28 November 2022 the serial started airing on Monday to Saturday at 6:00 pm and ended abruptly on 11 February 2023 due to actors date issues and poor ratings.
