= Namam Japikunna Veedu =

Indian television series

- Genre: Soap opera
- Created by: Govind Entertainments
- Developed by: Sudhakar Mangalodayam
- Written by: Sreejesh Vadakara
- Directed by: Nisanth
- Opening theme
- Country of origin: India
- Original language: Malayalam
- No. of seasons: 1
- No. of episodes: 158

Production
- Producers: Indulekha, Satheesh Chandran
- Cinematography: Gassel Sebastain
- Editor: Ajai Pulinkudy
- Running time: 20–22 minutes

Original release
- Network: Mazhavil Manorama
- Release: 26 October 2020 – 24 July 2021

Namam Japikunna Veedu is a Malayalam language Indian television drama airing on Mazhavil Manorama since 26 October 2020 and also streaming on Manorama Max. Senior Television artists Manoj Nair, Lavanya Nair, Sreelatha Namboothiri, Manju Satheesh and Risabawa play the lead roles.

== Cast ==
- Swathy Nithyanand as Arathy
- Manoj Nair as Rameshan Nair
- Anand Thrissur as Unni Ravi Varma
- Prem Jacob as Dr.Midhun Menon
- Kavitha Nair / Manju Satheesh as Radha Varma
- Surjith Purohit as Sarath
- Deepa Jayan / Aiswarya Devi as Nandana
- Saniya Babu / Anjali Krishna as Gopika
- Sreelatha Namboothiri as Mandhakini
- Rizabawa as Jagadeeshwara Varma
- Poornima Anand as Sharadendenu
- Gayathri as Sethulekshmi
- Alif Muhammed as Karthik
- Lal Krish as Jithesh
- Bhagya as Ardra Varma
- Renjusha Menon as Reena
- Santhosh Krishna as Santhosh
- Jaseela Parveen as Shreya Iyer
- Karthik Prasad as Deepak
- Sreekutty
