= Mampazhakkalam =

- Directed by: Joshiy
- Written by: T. A. Shahid
- Produced by: M. Mani
- Starring: Mohanlal; Shobana
- Cinematography: Sanjeev Shankar
- Edited by: Ranjan Abraham
- Music by: M. Jayachandran; S. P. Venkatesh (Score)
- Production company: Aroma Movie International
- Distributed by: Aroma Release
- Release date: 4 November 2004
- Running time: 160 minutes
- Country: India
- Language: Malayalam

Mambazhakkalam (transl. The season of mangoes) is a 2004 Indian Malayalam-language family drama film directed by Joshiy, written by T. A. Shahid and produced by M. Mani. It stars Mohanlal and Shobana, alongside a large supporting cast. The film features original songs composed by M. Jayachandran and background score by S. P. Venkatesh.

== Plot ==
Following his father's tragic suicide, Puramanayil Chandran was forced leave for Abu Dhabi at the young age of 22, to amortise all his father's debts. The film commences with his mother, Lakshmi, faking an illness to persuade Chandran to come back to India to get him married. Chandran, the eldest son of his family, takes care of his big family including his mother, uncle, aunt, his elder sister and brothers, and their spouses and children. From the money earned during his years of toil in the Persian Gulf region, Chandran has become a successful businessman. Now, he has opened and runs a successful charity school in the name of his late father.

During his vacation in India, Chandran has an excellent time with his family. However, Chandran's marriage doesn't take place because a suitable bride couldn't be found. Depressed by this, Chandran decides to go back to Abu Dhabi. On his way to the airport, Chandran sees his childhood friend Indira. Chandran's quest to meet Indira becomes unsuccessful and he decides to cancel his trip to Abu Dhabi.

As the plot uncovers, Chandran's love for Indira is realised. However, Indira is now a single mother of ten-year-old Malu after her ex-husband went to jail. One day Chandran sees Indira and her daughter. Malu does not like Chandran because of her bad experiences with her father. Indira's husband, Dr. Raghuram, is a drug addict and he used to physically abuse his ex-wife and kid. Malu warns Chandran to keep away from her mother.

When Dr. Raghuram is released from the jail, he meets Chandran and warns Chandran not to see Indira again. However, Chandran meets Indira once again to enquire about Dr. Raghuram. Dr. Raghuram issues another threat against his family. This forces Chandran's siblings and their families to leave him because of this relation. On a rainy night, Malu pays a visit to see Chandran and his mother. On this incident, Malu reveals her past: that Malu is not Indira's daughter.

Malu's mother, who was Dr. Raghuram's first wife, was killed by Dr. Raghuram in front of Indira when the two argued over his new marriage. Indira took Malu and ran away from him. Dr. Raghuram later comes to Indira's house to kill Malu and rape Indira. However, Chandran arrives in time and rescues Indira. Chandran warns Dr. Raghuram to keep away from Indira and Malu. All the family members reunite after realizing Chandran's love for them and the hard work he had done to give them a good life over the years. In the end, Lakshmi decides to get Chandran married to Indira and she accepts Malu as her own granddaughter.

== Cast ==
- Mohanlal as Puramanayil Chandran a.k.a. Prathap K Chandran
- Shobana as Indira
- Adithya Menon as Dr. Raghuram, Indira's ex-husband
- Harisree Ashokan as Kuttichira Sulaiman
- Kalabhavan Mani as Dubai Jose, Chandran's friend
- Kaviyoor Ponnamma as Lakshmi, Chandran's mother
- Cochin Haneefa as Manathudi / Mangatholi Madhavan, Mallika's husband and Chandran's brother-in law
- Poornima Anand as Mallika, Chandran's elder sister
- Vishnu Prasad as Sethumadhavan / Sethu, Chandran's younger brother
- Baiju Santhosh as Shivan, Chandran's younger brother
- Sudheesh as Ganeshan, Chandran's youngest brother who is a rising politician
- Sanusha as Malu, Indira's step daughter and Raghuram's real daughter
- Innocent as Lakshmi's elder brother and Chandran's Maternal Uncle (Ammavan)
- Rekha Ratheesh as Sethumadhavan's wife
- Kavitha Nair as Shivan's wife
- Suja Karthika as Kavitha, Ganeshan's wife
- Manka Mahesh as Ramani, Ammavan's wife and Chandran's 'Ammayi' (Aunt)
- Nedumudi Venu as Puramanayil Raghavan Nair 'Maash', Chandran's late father and a respected teacher who committed suicide
- Kozhikode Narayanan Nair as Thiramulpaddu "maash", Raghavan's old friend and Chandran's family friend
- Nivedya as Teacher, Thiramulpaddu's daughter
- Raj Kapoor (Tamil film director) as Soldier Keshavan
- Shammi Thilakan as Chackochan, Varkey's son who harasses Chandran's brothers
- V. K. Sreeraman as Sankaran 'Maash', Indira's father
- Kalasala Babu as "Blade" Varkey, a treacherous moneylender, Chackochan's father, and the one who tricked and harassed Chandran's father and forced the latter to commit suicide
- Kulappulli Leela as "Chakkanthara" Ammayi, Lakshmi's relative
- Kalpana as Neelima, "Chakkanthara" Ammayi's squinted daughter who has a crush on Chandran
- Zeenath
- Lakshmi Gopalaswami as Nirmala
- Neenu Thomas as Nithya, Dr.Raghuram's ex-wife
- Priya Mohan as Proposal to Chandran
- Geetha Salam as Ashraf, Chandran Friends
- Ambika Mohan as Kavitha's mother

== Soundtrack ==
All tracks are written by Gireesh Puthencherry.

No.	Title	Length
1.	"Paranjilla Njaan"	3:13
2.	"Kandu Kandu"	4:30
3.	"Kaantha Njanum Varam"	3:55
4.	"Kandu Kandu (Male)"	4:30
5.	"Alliyilam Kiliye"	4:28
6.	"Maampazhakkalam"	3:52
Total length:		24min 30sec

== Reception ==
Mampazhakkalam was released on 4 November 2004.
