= Njanum Ente Familiyum =

- Directed by: K. K. Rajeev
- Written by: Cheriyan Kalpakavadi
- Produced by: G. P. Vijayakumar
- Starring: Jayaram; Mamta Mohandas
- Cinematography: Vaidy S. Pillai
- Music by: Songs: M. G. Sreekumar; Background score: Ronnie Raphael
- Production company: Seven Arts
- Release date: 4 February 2012
- Running time: 160 min
- Country: India
- Language: Malayalam

Njanum Ente Familiyum (transl. Me and my family) is a 2012 Malayalam family drama film directed by K. K. Rajeev and starring Jayaram and Mamta Mohandas in the lead roles. Written by Cheriyan Kalpakavadi, it is the first feature film by television serial director K. K. Rajeev. The film examines the problems in a doctor's family and is told in a humorous way. It was shot from the locales of Palakkad and Munnar in Kerala and Pollachi in Tamil Nadu.

== Plot ==
The film starts with Dr. Dinanathan and his family leaving for a vacation. But midway they get a call from the hospital due to an emergency surgery and he has to come back to the hospital. All goes well and Dinanathan is called to Chennai for surgery. It turns out to be his ex-lover Sophia's husband who dies in spite of the successful surgery. He sends a letter to Dinanathan telling him to take care of Sophia. From there, the story goes to complicated situations which result in the birth of Dinanathan's child from Sophia, her death due to a careless mistake, and Dinanathan taking the baby into his own family.

== Cast ==
- Jayaram as Dr. Dinanathan
- Mamta Mohandas as Dr. Priya
- Mythili as Sophia
- Manoj K. Jayan as John Paileykunnel
- Jagathy Sreekumar as Dr. Easwarmoorthy
- Mallika Sukumaran as Jaininte
- Nedumudi Venu
- Baby Esther Anil as Dinanathan's daughter
- Surabhi Lakshmi as Clara
- Subi Suresh as Ammalu
- Jayan Cherthala
- Dinesh Panicker
