= Pokkuveyil (TV series) =

- Based on: Innalayo Inno by KK Sudharkaran
- Screenplay by: Jayaraj Vijay
- Directed by: K. K. Rajeev
- Starring: Krishna; Sruthi Lakshmi
- Music by: Rajeev Attukal
- Opening theme: Rappakalile
- Country of origin: India
- Original language: Malayalam
- No. of episodes: 109

Production
- Production location: Kochi
- Editor: Ananthu S Vijay

Original release
- Release: 1 March – 2 September 2016

Related
- Rathrimazha

Pokkuveyil is a 2016 Indian Malayalam-language soap opera started on 1 March 2016 and 2 September 2016. Malayalam actress Sruthi Lakshmi, who made her debut as a child artist through the serial Nizhalukal, makes her comeback to Malayalam serial industry playing the female lead along with actor Krishna.

Its story is adapted from the novel in Grihalekshmi "Innalayo Inno" written by K. K. Sudhakaran. The series is directed by K. K. Rajeev. The opening theme of the serial Rakkanavile became very popular.

It aired on FLOWERS TV from Mondays to Thursdays at 9:00 pm IST. It replaced FLOWERS TV's popular crime thriller Eshwaran Sakshiyayi, which was also directed by K. K. Rajeev with Prem Prakash, Divya Prabha and Reena .

The show was relaunched on the same channel from 4 January 2018 every day at 8:30 pm, and the show was again telecast from 22 October at 7:30 pm.

== Synopsis ==
Pokkuveyil tells the story of Isha, a pregnant girl who comes to Kochi and unexpectedly meets with an accident. She is helped by Ravi and Sabitha. She promises to give her child whom she was about to abort as it is an illegitimate child. Isha changes her identity as Shruthi with the help of her friend Jamuna. Shruthi comes to Ravi's house but was surprised to learn that Ravi is Sudeep's brother. Ravi and Sabitha, along with Ravi's father and Sabitha's mother, leave. Shruthi tells several lies to them and becomes closer to everyone in the house.

== Cast ==
- Sruthi Lakshmi as Isha Aravind/Sruthi Aravind
- Yadhu Krishnan as Arun Thomas
- Krishna as Sudeep (Sudhi) / Podimon
- Aji John(film director) as Cyril
- Nedumbram Gopi as Ravi-Sudeep's father
- Ravikrishnan Gopalakrishnan as Ravi
- Reena Basheer as Sabitha Ravi
- Parvathy Krishnan as Jayasudha
- Gayathri as Jalaja
- Balachandran Chullikkadu as Chitrabhanu
- Bindhu Murali as Arun's mother
- Aamy Vijayan as Jamuna

== Awards ==
Kerala State television awards 2016

- Best TeleSerial
- Kerala state television award for best actress - Shruthi Lakshmi
- Best Screenplay - Jayaraj Vijay
- Best Second Actress - Reena Basheer

Flowers TV awards 2017

- Best Supporting actor - Aji John

== Plot ==
Isha Aravind is working in Bangalore and falls in love with Sudeep who is also settled in Bangalore. Cyril, who wants Isha, brainwashes Sudeep and separates Isha from him by creating a story of another relationship in which Balu and Isha are affiliated. Seeing this, Sudeep gets angry and orchestrates a car accident on Isha and Balu. Balu is in critical danger. Isha comes to Kerala as Sruthi, faints, and falls on the road. She is pregnant. Sabitha and Ravi, the sister in law and brother of Sudeep respectively, save her and plan to adopt her child, not knowing that she had a relationship with Sudeep. Isha changes her identity to Shruthi with the help of her friend Jamuna. Shruthi comes to Ravi's house but is shocked to discover that Ravi is Sudeep's brother. Ravi and Sabitha, along with Ravi's father and Sabitha's mother, leave. Shruthi tells several lies to them and becomes closer to everyone in the house.

Shruthi works in Arun Thomas's Dream flower builders, he knows all the flashback incidents of Isha. He helps her to take a revenge on Sudeep. Sudeep who believes that Isha had cheated her. It was Cyril, a cunning friend of Sudeep played careful to separate the pair as he had a soft feeling for Isha. Sudeep is engaged with Jayasudha, a distant relative of them. He who was in China for job returned for marriage but was shocked to see pregnant Isha out there. Cyril learns that Isha is along with Sudeep but pretends that he doesn't know. Story takes a twist when Balu who was hit by Sudeep (as he misunderstood Balu and Isha had an illegitimate affair) was critical and along with Isha Missing case filed by her mother, who wanted all the property in her daughter's name. Karnataka police comes to Kochi for further Investigation. Cyril plays crucial role to make the situation worse.

Jayasudha, Cyril and Jithendran (Jaya's uncle) brainwashes Sudeep to ask for his share from the properties belonging to his father in Mavelikkara, his father says that Ravi and Sudeep can share the property after his death. Pillai knows the truth that Shruthi bears his son's child. Later due to continuous efforts Pillai was forced to give away his property but he also gives a share to Shruthi, everyone claims that he is mad and Shruthi had brainwashed him. Later Jayasudha tells all truth that Shruthi bears an illegitimate child Ravi and Sabitha plans to adopt that baby. The situation changes when Ravi tells that Shruthi was taken back by the one who cheated her, but the truth was that she was taken to a safe by Ravi only. But cunningly Cyril finds out Shruthi and she gives birth to a daughter. Her mind changes and becomes reluctant to give the baby to Ravi, Arun Thomas takes her to a safe place but finally she gives her baby as Cyril took the situation rightly to make fool of others. Cyril conveys his love for Isha to his parents and uncle, they agrees. Sudeep, Ravi and Arun Thomas asks her to leave the place but she accepts Cyril's proposal. After marriage he becomes very possessive about her, but one fine night he is attacked by a group of gangsters and loses his leg. In the hospital, Balu visits Cyril then the truth was revealed that it was Sudeep who is the real cheat not Cyril. Sudeep has cheated Balu's sister Bhama and then cheated Isha, everyone was shocked after hearing this. Finally Ravi and Pillai hand over the baby to Shruthi. Isha realises Cyril's true love for her. The series ends with Isha pushing the wheelchair having Cyril with Isha and Sudeep's baby.
