= Swantham Bharya Zindabad =

2010 Malayalam film

- Theatrical poster
- Directed by: Biju Vattappara
- Written by: Biju Vattappara, Raaffi Mathirra
- Produced by: Raaffi Mathirra
- Starring: Guinness Pakru; Mukesh; Sruthi Lakshmi; Sreejith K
- Cinematography: Anbu Mani
- Edited by: Samjith Mohammed
- Music by: Kaithapram Viswanathan; I. John
- Production company: Chitranjali
- Distributed by: Beebah Creations & Sayujyam Cine Release
- Release date: 26 November 2010
- Running time: 120 Minutes
- Country: India
- Language: Malayalam

Swantham Bharya Zindabad is a 2010 Malayalam film produced by Raaffi Mathirra under the banner Ifar International and directed by Biju Vattappara, starring Guinness Pakru, Mukesh and Sruthilakshmi in the lead roles.

== Plot ==
Pakru plays a Communist Vettoor Sivankutty in the film. He marries a girl who doesn't believe in Communist ideals. She is a big fan of superstar Pavan Kumar. The movie explores Sivankutty's plight when Pavan Kumar arrives in the village for a film shoot.

== Cast ==
- Guinness Pakru as Vettoor Sivankutty
- Mukesh as Pavan Kumar
- Harisree Ashokan as Uthaman
- Sruthi Lakshmi as Meenakshi
- Suraj Venjaramood as Dr. Ulpalakshan
- Salim Kumar as T.K Vipin Kumar
- Mala Aravindan as Party Secretary
- Sreejith K as Meenakshi's Brother
- Jaffar Idukki as Balan
- Saju Kodiyan as Film Director
- Kalabhavan Haneef as Production Executive
- Thesni Khan as Ambujam
- Raghavan as Shivankutty's Father
- Manka Mahesh as Shivankutty's Mother
- Meena Ganesh as Vasanthi
- Mafiya Sasi as himself
