= Diary of a Housewife =

2001 film by Vinod Sukumaran

- Film poster
- Directed by: Vinod Sukumaran
- Written by: Mohan Raghavan
- Produced by: Palm Yard Films
- Cinematography: Santosh Thundiyil
- Music by: Chandran Veyattummal
- Release date: 2001
- Running time: 14 minutes 51 seconds
- Language: Malayalam

Diary of A Housewife is a 2001 short film directed by Vinod Sukumaran. The screenplay is written by Mohan Raghavan, with cinematography by Santosh Thundiyil. The film won the National Film Award for Best First Non-feature Film of a Director in 2002.

This film focuses on the concept of waiting and philosophical crisis of war. Through a young wife, it deals with philosophy of war, and the hopes and expectations related to it.

The film revolves around three female characters; a young lady, and old woman, and a girl.

== Major film festival screenings ==
- Inaugural Film of Indian Panorama at International Film Festival of India (IFFI 2002) held in New Delhi.
- Asian Cinema Section of Commonwealth Film Festival, Manchester (CFF 2002)
- River to River Florence-India Film Festival in Italy 2002
- Competition Section of Mumbai International Film festival (MIFF 2002)
- World Cinema Section of International Film Festival of Kerala (IFFK2002)
- National Film Festival organized by Kerala State Chalachitra Academy (2003)
