= Vinod Sukumaran =

Indian film maker

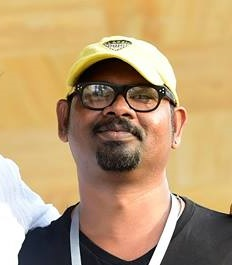
- Vinod Sukumaran
- Born: Vinod Sukumaran; Thennilapuram, Palakkad, India
- Education: Film and Television Institute of India, Pune; School of Drama and Fine Arts, Thrissur
- Occupations: Film Editor; Screenwriter; Stage Actor; Director
- Years active: 1999 - 2015
- Parent(s): K.Sukumaran, Karathiyani
- Awards: National Award, Kerala State Film Award, Film Critic Association Award, Mathrubhumi Film Award

Vinod Sukumaran is an Indian film maker and film editor. He won the National Film Award for Best First Non-Feature Film of a Director for the film Diary of a Housewife in 2001.

He is an alumnus of the Film and Television Institute of India. He has won the Kerala state Film Award as Best Editor for the Malayalam film Ore Kadal directed by Shyamaprasad in 2007 and Ivan Megharoopan directed by P.Balachandran. His first feature film was Haram in 2015.

== Personal life ==
Vinod Sukumaran was born on 20 January at Palakkad district of Kerala, as the youngest son of K. Sukumaran and M. Karthiyani. After completing his degree (BTA) in Theatre Arts from the School of Drama and Fine Arts, Thrissur, Calicut University, in 1989, he joined the Film and Television Institute of India, Pune in 1992, where he earned his diploma in Film Editing. His first independent work as an editor was the FTII diploma film Veg or Non-Veg (1993), directed by Gurpal Singh. Vinod Sukumaran currently serves as a dean in KRNNIVSA

== Career ==
Sukumaran was assistant editor from 1995 to 1999 for Renu Saluja. His first film, Diary of a Housewife, won the National Award in 2002 for the Best first film of a Director in non-fiction category.

He has achieved Mathrubhumi film award as best film editor for AKALE, a Malayalam feature film directed by Shyamaprasad in 2005 and best film editor award for the same film in the same year from Kerala state Film Critic Association.

Sukumaran has chaired or participated on judging panels of multiple film festivals and award shows, including Kerala State Film Award. His first feature film was HARAM the Malayalam film acted by the Fahad Fasil and Radhika Apte in lead roles.

== Filmography ==
Year	Title	Editor	Director	Line producer	Awards	Notes
1999	Lights on water	Yes				Documentary
1999	Agnisakshi					Associate director
2002	Diary of a Housewife	Yes	Yes	Yes	National Award for Best First film of a Director, Non-Fiction Category	Short film, co- writer with Mohan Raghavan
2003	Ullurukkam	Yes		Yes		Associate director
2004	Akale	Yes			Mathrubhumi Film Award for Best Editor, Kerala Film Critics Award for Best Editor	Associate director
2006	Daivanamathil	Yes				Co-editor with Bina Paul
2007	Ore Kadal	Yes			Kerala State Film Award for Best Editor	
2008	10ML Lov	Yes				Hindi feature film
2008	Hello Zindagi	Yes		Yes		Hindi feature film
2008	Firaq		First AD			Hindi feature film
2009	Rithu	Yes		Yes		Sound designer
2009	786	Yes	Yes	Yes		TV film
2010	TD Dasan Std 6B	Yes				
2010	Elektra	Yes				
2010	Clock Wise	Yes				Online editor
2010	Chandrayaan	Yes				English feature film
2011	Ivan Megharoopan	Yes			Kerala State Film Award for Best Editor	
2012	Arike	Yes				
2013	English	Yes				
2013	Artist	Yes				
2015	Haram (film)	Yes	Yes			Writer
2015	Ore Udal	Yes				Co-writer
2024	Manorathangal	Yes				Episode : Kazhcha
