= Nasrani (film) =

2007 film directed by Joshiy

- Directed by: Joshiy
- Written by: Ranjith
- Produced by: Rajan Thaliparambu
- Starring: Mammootty; Vimala Raman; Kalabhavan Mani; Muktha
- Cinematography: Shaji Kumar
- Edited by: Ranjan Abraham
- Music by: Songs: Bijibal; Background Score: Ouseppachan
- Distributed by: Marikkar Films
- Release date: 12 October 2007
- Running time: 150 minutes
- Country: India
- Language: Malayalam

Nasrani is a 2007 Indian Malayalam-language political crime thriller film directed by Joshiy, produced by Rajan Thaliparambu, written by Ranjith and starring Mammootty. The film tells the story of an Achayan from a Syrian Orthodox family in Central Travancore. K.P.A.C. Lalitha won the Asianet Film Award for Best Supporting Actress for her role. The film was a box office failure.

== Plot ==
The story begins on the eve of the wedding of David John Kottarathil and Sara Eapen. The two were childhood sweethearts, both hailing from rich planter families in the affluent town of Kottayam, Kerala. While both families are celebrating in their own homes, Sara's father Eapen is visibly disturbed. He has just received a phone call from Alice, his mistress, who is demanding public acknowledgement of their relationship. She wants to attend the wedding of David and Sara, as a means to achieve this. Eapen, who is a rich planter, is at risk of losing his good name in society, despite having generously provided for Alice and their daughter thus far. He offers to pay for her silence with a bigger bungalow and his estates in a far-away town of Chikmaglur. He requests John Kottarathil, his best friend - whose son is set to marry Sara the next day - to accompany him while talking to his mistress. John requests the help of M C Paul, a rising politician and Eapen's brother-in-law to aid in the negotiation. The trio meet the mistress to discuss terms, but in a fit of rage, a drunk Eapen ends up shooting her. Eapen also tries to kill his illegitimate daughter, the nine year old Annie but John stops him. In the struggle that follows, Eapen is also shot. John looks at Paul for assistance, but is met with a helpless silence.

Ten years later, John is retelling this story to the jailor Rajeevan, who points out that John's defense in court was half-hearted and that he seems uninterested in parole despite possibly being eligible for it. John confirms this, saying he feels guilty for Eapen's death, although it was a genuine accident while saving Annie. Further, he reveals that Paul had requested that his presence at the scene of crime be kept a secret, lest it should affect his image and political prospects.

The marriage of David and Sara never happened, primarily because Sara's mother is against her marrying David, whose father John was responsible for Eapen's death. She even believes John supported Eapen's affair with Alice. Meanwhile, David and Sara are still in love and observe their "anniversary" in a romantic manner, supported by his driver and right-hand man Suku. DK, as David is known, is a rich planter and the Secretary of the Cosmo Club - the hangout of the rich and famous in the town of Kottayam. He has a close gang of friends at the club, which includes Rajagopal Kartha, Superintendent of Police, Kottayam and several businessmen. Sara is a lecturer at the local college.

M.C Paul has grown in stature as a politician, having served as the Revenue Minister of the state and undisputed leader of the Malankara Congress party. He now aims to launch his son Dr. Benny Paul, who is a prominent youth leader. He has his eye on the Assembly seat in Kaduthuruthy constituency in Kottayam, which was vacated by incumbent Ummachan following allegations of corruption. Despite his popularity, Benny is facing a potential scandal related to the recent suicide of Archana, a student of the Kottayam Medical College. He publicly denies any relationship with her, but this is contested by Annie - Eapen's illegitimate daughter who is now under David and Sara's care. Annie was Archana's best friend and knew of her affair with Benny.

Benny is found dead in his home the next day, and Annie is believed to have killed him. She confides in David, stating that despite intending to kill Benny for denying his relationship with Archana, she arrived at his home only to find him dead already from a stab wound. David realizes that the Police-Politician nexus has already decided to frame Annie for the crime and also learns of evidence fabricated for the purpose. He uses his influence and resources to keep her away from the reach of the law until he can clear her name by finding the real culprit. He loses some of his closest friends in the process.

The rest of the action-thriller is about his quest to prove Annie's innocence and exposing the false idols in socio-politics in the town of Kottayam and the state itself.

== Cast ==
- Mammootty as David John Kottarathil "DK"
- Vimala Raman as Sara Eapen, DK's fiancée and lover
- Muktha as Annie, Sara's half-sister
- Kalabhavan Mani as Sukumaran "Suku", DK's driver and friend
- Biju Menon as Xavier Paul "Sevichan"
- Lalu Alex as SP Rajagopal, DK's friend
- Bharat Gopy as Adv. Narayanan Swami, DK's friend and clubmate
- Vijayaraghavan as M. C. Paul, Xavier's father
- Maniyanpilla Raju as Kunjachan, DK's friend and clubmate
- Captain Raju as John Kottarathil, DK's father
- Baburaj as Zayed, DK's friend and clubmate
- Arun as Dr. Benny Paul, Xavier's brother and M. C. Paul's younger son
- Jagathy Sreekumar as Ummachan, politician
- Innocent as Father Pulikkoottil, DK's mentor
- Janardhanan as Thampi / Thampichayan, DK's friend and clubmate
- Sadiq as CPO Aboobacker
- Devan as Thampan Joseph
- Rizabawa as Plappallil Eapen, Sara and Annie's father
- Bheeman Raghu as Jail Superintendent Rajeevan, a friendly and kindhearted officer
- Augustine as Club Attender PP
- Babu Namboothiri as Mannanthala Varghese, M. C. Paul's P.A
- K. P. A. C. Lalitha as Mother Superior, DK's Aunt and John's elder sister
- Sukumari as Annamma Chettathi, DK's housemaid
- Sreelatha Namboothiri as Kochammini, Eapen's wife and Sara's mother
- Bindu Panicker as M. C. Paul's wife
- Zeenath as jail inmate
- Biju Pappan as Unni, Sevichan's friend
- Radhika as Archana Shankar, Annie's friend
- Anil Murali as club visitor
- Balachandran Chullikkadu as advocate, DK's friend
- Ponnamma Babu as wedding guest
- Santhosh Jogi as Chundan Baiju
- Reshmi Boban as Alice, Eapen's second wife and Annie's mother
- Gayathri as M. C. Paul's relative
- Jeeja Surendran as jail inmate
- Althara as Roma, college student
- Ramesh Pisharody as Biju, channel reporter (cameo)
- P. Sreekumar as Jailer Chandran Pillai
- Aniyappan as Kuriyachan
- Nandhu Pothuval as Watchman Vavachan
- Ambika Mohan as Warden
- Jis Joy as Politicians

== Production ==
The film is produced by Rajan Doha under the banner of Horizon Entertainment. The locations of the film included Kottayam, Palai, Neriamangalam and Vagamon.

== Soundtrack ==
The film's soundtrack contains two songs, both composed by Bijibal and lyrics by Anil Panachooran. The film's background score is done by Ouseppachan.

#	Title	Singer(s)
1	"Eeran Meghame"	Manjari
2	"Kaanana Nizhalin"	Pradeep Palluruthy
