= Nadodimannan =

- Theatrical release poster
- Directed by: Viji Thampi
- Screenplay by: Krishna Poojappura
- Story by: V.S. Subhash
- Produced by: V. S. Suresh
- Starring: Dileep; Sayaji Shinde; Nedumudi Venu; Ananya; Archana Kavi; Mythili
- Cinematography: Sanjeev Sankar
- Edited by: K. Sreenivas
- Music by: Vidyasagar
- Production company: Vendhar Movies
- Release date: 18 October 2013
- Running time: 160 minutes
- Country: India
- Language: Malayalam

Nadodimannan (transl. The Vagabond/Immigrant king) is a 2013 Indian Malayalam-language action comedy film directed by Viji Thampi, starring Dileep in the title role, along with Sayaji Shinde, Nedumudi Venu, Ananya, Archana Kavi and Mythili in the supporting role. Dileep and Viji Thampi collaborated after 17 years in this movie. The film is a satire that portrays how corruption and favoritism engulf a place and how they can be tackled.

== Plot ==
The movie starts with Vinayachandran, an environmentalist getting killed by a rich influential real estate criminal businessman, Pushpam Prakashan as Vinayachandran was opposing Prakashan's dream project- Pushpam Mall citing environmental and societal reasons. Prakashan has the backing of the ruling party, police and a corrupt Mayor Purushothaman for all his wrongdoings as he helps them financially whenever they are in need. Once his eyes cast on something, Prakashan will try to acquire it by any means for his gains. His next target is an old man Damodaran's house and its surrounding plot occupied by Damodaran and his granddaughter Meera for developing another project. Even though Damodaran approaches higher-ranked officials including the Mayor to save from the advances of Prakashan, he now realizes that they all are nothing but associates of Prakashan. One night, Prakashan's henchmen attacks him and tries to kidnap Meera. In the tussle, Damodaran stabs himself and Prakashan's henchmen hospitalises him as his death will bring trouble to Prakashan.

The film then focuses to Palakkad where Padmanabhan hails from. Padmanabhan is a carefree and cheerful man who along with his friends do roadside shows, artificial political rallies, marches and hail and hoot for movies in theatres for daily wages. One day, he gets a call from Thiruvananthapuram to get his gang for organizing a political rally in support of Purushothaman to boost his image in the upcoming election. Padmanabhan and his gang leaves to Thiruvananthapuram the next day and he gets injured in a bomb blast planned by Prakashan and gets hospitalized.

Padmanabhan knowingly and unknowingly involves in various issues happening there. When the people found a leader's characteristics in Padmanabhan, they and the Thiruvancore Thirumanassu Udaya Varma force him to contest in the upcoming election. He wins the election and becomes the next mayor. Being the mayor in the city, Padmanabhan is loved by everybody and he starts building public parks, toilets and facilities for the common people. He also asks the people to give away the places which really belong to the government. By seeing all these changes, Prakashan tries to bribe Padmanabhan but he insults Prakashan. Prakashan gets furious and tries to kill Padmanabhan but Padmanabhan's mother and his chauffeur Subair get killed in the accident made by Prakashan's henchman Kannappan.

Padmanabhan devises a plan to get revenge on Prakashan. He decides to destroy Pushpam Mall for good. He joins a demolition firm and sets the equipments for demolition all throughout the building. But when there is only 15 minutes left for the demolition, Prakashan calls Padmanabhan saying that he has kidnapped Thirumanassu. Padmanabhan rushes into the building and fights off Prakashan and Kannappan. During the fight, Kannappan is accidentally killed by Prakashan when he tries to shoot Padmanabhan. When Padmanabhan is about to kill Prakashan and avenge his mother's death, Thirumanassu stops him, saying to him "let god decide his fate", but Padmanabhan cuts Prakashan's thumb for accessing the elevator and they escape just in time and the building is demolished, killing Prakashan along with it. The mall is now converted into a public park.

== Cast ==
- Dileep as Mayor Vadekkemadathil Padmanabhan
- Sayaji Shinde as Pushpam Prakashan, The main antagonist
- Nedumudi Venu as Thiruvithancore Maharaja His Highness Udaya Varma Thampuran
- Ananya as Meera, Padmanabhan's love interest
- Archana Kavi as Athira, a medical doctor and the niece of the Maharajah
- Mythili as Rima, a journalist
- Shobha Mohan as Jalaja, Padmanabhan's mother
- Janardhanan as Damodaran, Meera's grandfather
- Suraj Venjaramoodu as Sarasappan, Padmanabhan's friend
- Salim Kumar as Ravi, Padmanabhan's brother-in-law
- Riyaz Khan as CI George T. V., Prakashan's associate
- Vijayaraghavan as Purusothaman, a corrupt mayor of Trivandrum and Prakashan's associate
- Saikumar as Chief Minister Thomas Chacko
- Shammi Thilakan as CI Karadi Johnny
- Shivaji Guruvayoor as SI Hameed
- Kalabhavan Prajod as Subair
- Sreelatha Namboothiri as Shahina, Subair's mother
- Mohan Jose as Finance Minister K. A. Paulose
- Asif Ali as Arun, Rima's Husband Photo Archived in Mobile Phone
- Ashokan as Vinayachandran (cameo appearance)
- Balachandran Chullikadu as KRP
- Sunil Sukhada as Varijakshan
- Kozhikode Narayanan Nair as Swami, Maharajah's secretary
- Chali Pala as Peelipose, Prakashan's associate
- Abu Salim as Kannappan, Prakashan's henchman and the secondary antagonist
- Shiju as Chandrakumar, Owner of the Demolition Company
- Kulappulli Leela as Leela
- Sreekala Sasidharan as Deepa, Vinayachandran's wife
- Murali as Sakhavu Madhavan, Padmanabhan's late father (Photo archive)
- Kalabhavan Haneef as Vasu
- Geetha Salam as Mammachan
- Ponnamma Babu as Annamma Paulose
- Narayanankutty
- Gayathri as Padmanabhan's sister
- Vettoor Purushan as Krishnankutty
- Koottickal Jayachandran as Santhosh, Padmanabhan's friend
- A. S. Joby as Krishnankutty
- Kalabhavan Rahman
- Manu Raj as George
- Manu Varma as Joseph Kuruvilla

== Music ==
The film features three tracks composed by Vidyasagar.

Track#	Title	Singer(s)
1	"Palam Kadakkan Padmanaabha"	M. G. Sreekumar
2	"Macha Ente Matharam"	Udit Narayan, Rimi Tomy, Jyotsna Radhakrishnan, Ranjini Jose
3	"Mannan Mannan Nadodi Mannan"	Afsal
4	Sarvarogi	Vishnu
