= Mohan Raghavan =

Malayalam film director

- Born: 22 January 1964; Annamanada, Thrissur, Kerala, India
- Died: 25 October 2011 (aged 47); Kundai, Thrissur, Kerala, India
- Occupations: Film Director; screenwriter

Mohan Raghavan (22 January 1964 – 25 October 2011) was a Malayalam film director. He studied at the School of Drama, Thrissur, and in Theatre Arts at Madurai Kamaraj University.

== Biography ==
Raghavan is from Annamanada, Thrissur district. He undertook post-graduate studies in Theatre Arts from the Madurai Kamaraj University.

== Filmography ==
- 1994 - Kadal - Associate Director
- 2001 - Diary of a Housewife - Writer
- 2008 - Kariyachan v/s Kariyachan (Tele film)
- 2010 - T. D. Dasan Std. VI B - Director & Writer

== Awards ==
Awards won through T. D. Dasan Std. VI B (2010)

- Kerala State Film Award for Best Debut Director
- New York Indian Film Festival Award for Best Screenplay
- John Abraham Award for Best Film (Director)
- Kerala Film Critics Association Awards for Best Story
- Special Jury Award by World Malayali Council Awards
- INSPIRE Awards for Best Debutant Director
- Amrita-FEFKA Film Awards for Best Film (Director)
- Amrita-FEFKA Film Awards for Best Director
- Jaihind TV Film Awards for Best Screenplay (posthumous)
