= Anuraga Ganam Pole =

2023 Indian Malayalam language TV series

- Genre: Drama; Romance
- Created by: Ekta Kapoor
- Based on: Patrani by Imtiaz Patel
- Story by: Deepika Bajpai; Dialogues; Santhosh Kuttamath
- Directed by: K. K. Rajeev; Purushothaman; Shiju Aroor
- Starring: Kavitha Nair
- Opening theme: "Ethu Janma Swapnamayi" by Hesham Abdul Wahab
- Country of origin: India
- Original language: Malayalam
- No. of episodes: 239

Production
- Producers: Antony; Saji Millenium
- Cinematography: Vishnu Nair
- Editor: M Sivashankar
- Camera setup: Multi-camera
- Production company: Zee Telefilms

Original release
- Network: Zee Keralam
- Release: 17 April 2023 – 15 March 2024

Related
- Bade Achhe Lagte Hain

Anuraga Ganam Pole (transl. Like a romantic song) is an Indian Malayalam language drama television series which aired from 17 April 2023 to 15 March 2024 on Zee Keralam. Kavitha Nair and Prince play the lead roles. The plot of the show is inspired from a Hindi series Bade Achhe Lagte Hain, which aired on SET.

The show explores the worlds of English lecturer Sumitha and Business tycoon Giridhar Nambiar, who accidentally discover love after getting married. Based on the Gujarati play Patrani by Imtiaz Patel, the soap opera was created and produced by under the banner of Zee Cinema.

== Synopsis ==
Giridhar Nambiar is an unmarried, wealthy, established, and well-reputed Kochi-based businessman in his early forties.Sumitha Chandran is a working woman in her early thirties and comes from a middle-class Kochi family. Giridhar's half-sister, a famous stylish Saniya, and Sumi's brother, Srinish fall in love and have to consider the Hindu culture taboo of younger siblings marrying before their elder siblings. Girish has yet to select a prospective spouse so the marriage of Srinish and Saniya is pending.

There is a solution. Giri and Sumi agree to the marry although she dislikes the economic disparity between their families. They considers each other arrogant and quarrelsome. They become closer with time and consummate their marriage.

== Cast ==
- Kavitha Nair as Sumitha Giridhar Nambiar Nee Sumitha Chandranandan Alias Sumi - Chandranandan And Indira's Elder Daughter, Srinish And Nanditha's Elder Sister, Giridhar's Wife
- Prince As Giridhar Nambiar Alias Giri - Satyanarayanan And Mahalakshmi's Son, Anuradha's Step Son, Navya, Neeraj And Saniya's Elder Half Brother, Nithish And Pratheeksha's Adopted Elder Brother, Sumitha's Husband
- Jaseela Parveen as Saniya Srinish Chandranandan Nee Saniya Nambiar - Satyanarayanan And Anuradha's Younger Daughter, Giridhar's 2nd Younger Half Sister, Nithish, Navya And Neeraj's Younger Sister, Srinish's Wife
- Ambika Mohan As Mahalakshmi Satyanarayanan Nambiar - Satyanarayanan's First Wife, Giridhar's Mother, Nithish, Navya, Neeraj And Saniya's Step Mother, Pratheeksha's Adopted Mother
- Aishwarya Sankar as Nanditha Nithish Nambiar Nee Nanditha Chandranandan - Chandranandan And Indira's Younger Daughter, Srinish And Sumitha's Younger Sister, Nithish's Wife
- Nitha Promy as Anuradha Satyanarayanan Nambiar - Ambarish's Elder Sister, Satyanarayanan's Second Wife, Giridhar's Step Mother, Nithish, Navya, Neeraj And Saniya's Mother
- Jayanarayan as Akash Mohan - Sneha's Husband, Giridhar's Best Friend And Employee
- Thushara KP as Sneha Akash Mohan - Akash's Wife, Giridhar And Sumitha's Best Friend
- Koottickal Jayachandran as Ambarish - Anuradha's Younger Brother, Satyanarayanan's Brother In Law, Giridhar's Step Uncle, Nithish, Navya, Neeraj And Saniya's Uncle
- Mathew Issac Abraham as Nithish Nambiar - Anuradha's Elder Son, Satyanarayanan's Step Son, Giridhar's Adopted Brother, Navya, Neeraj And Saniya's Elder Brother, Nanditha's Husband
- Priya Menon / Ragisha Shreekumar as Indira Chandran -
- Balachandran Chullikkadu as Chandran
- Thomaskutty Abraham as Srinish Chandran
- Remadevi as Pinky muthashi
- Jeeja Surendran as Kadambari
- Sruthy Madhu as Navya
- Alif Shah as Vineeth
- Soumya Saleedher as Prateeksha
- Reshma Nair as Kiran
- Ambika Mohan as MahaLakshmi Amma
- Melanie meleena as Doctor
- Anjali Rao as Maya ( Guest appearance)
- Devika pillai as Sharika( Guest appearance)
- Mersheena Neenu as Shalini ( Guest appearance)
- Sridevika as SI Meera Varghese
- Aman Saka as singer in " Pallikettu Sabarimalakku"
- Ananthagopan as singer in " Pallikettu Sabarimalakku"
- Sreejith Babu as singer in " Pallikettu Sabarimalakku"
- Anvedh Aswin as Manikandan

== Adaptations ==
| Language | Title | Original release | Network(s) | Last aired | Notes |
|---|---|---|---|---|---|
| Hindi | Bade Achhe Lagte Hain बडे अच्छे लगते हैं | 30 May 2011 | SET | 10 July 2014 | Original |
| Malayalam | Anuraga Ganam Pole അനുരാഗ ഗാനം പോലെ | 17 April 2023 | Zee Keralam | 15 March 2024 | Remake |
| Kannada | Amruthadhaare ಅಮೃತಧಾರೆ | 29 May 2023 | Zee Kannada | 15 November 2026 | Remake |
| Tamil | Nenjathai Killadhe நெஞ்சத்தை கில்லாதே | 1 July 2024 | Zee Tamil | 17 January 2025 | Remake |
| Marathi | Veen Doghantali Hi Tutena वीण दोघांतली ही तुटेना | 11 August 2025 | Zee Marathi | Ongoing | Remake |
