= Haram (film) =

2015 Indian Malayalam-language romantic drama film

- Directed by: Vinod Sukumaran
- Written by: Vinod Sukumaran
- Produced by: P. Sukumar; Saji Samuel
- Starring: Fahadh Faasil; Radhika Apte
- Cinematography: Satheesh Kurup
- Edited by: Vinod Sukumaran
- Music by: Thaikkudam Bridge
- Production companies: Odd Impressions & Big Leaf
- Release date: 20 February 2015
- Country: India
- Language: Malayalam

Haram is a 2015 Indian Malayalam-language romantic drama film written, edited and directed by Vinod Sukumaran (in his directorial debut). Starring Fahadh Faasil and Radhika Apte, the film was produced by P. Sukumar and Saji Samuel under the banner of Odd Impressions & Big Leaf. Satheesh Kurup was the cinematographer and Thaikkudam Bridge provided the music.

Haram was released on 20 February 2015. Angel Shijoy won Kerala State Film Award for Best Dubbing Artist for lending voice for Radhika Apte.

== Cast ==
- Fahadh Faasil as Balakrishnan (Balu)
- Radhika Apte as Isha
- S. P. Sreekumar as Salaam
- Rajshri Deshpande as Ameena
- Sagarika Bhatia as Gargi
- Madhupal
- Renji Panicker as Isha's Father
- Binoy
- Thara Kalyan
- M. Vishnu as Moota Chettiyar

== Release ==
Haram was released on 20 February 2015.

=== Critical reception ===
Sify wrote, "the film leaves you with some solid memories that will haunt you long after the end titles start rolling. But it could have been much better in a film, which has some fantastic moments, that too with spectacular visuals and superb music". The Times of India gave the film 2.5 stars out of 5 and wrote, "Vinod Sukumaran's Haram has all the elements in place for an urban love story. However, what results is a mishmash sequence of disconnected -though beautifully made - sequences". Rediff gave 2 stars as well and wrote, "the film loses its steam midway even though its length is barely two hours" and that "Haram does not make us happy".
