= Romeo (2007 film) =

2007 Malayalam romantic comedy film

- Directed by: Rajasenan
- Written by: Rafi Mecartin
- Produced by: Rafi Mecartin
- Starring: Dileep; Vimala Raman; Samvrutha Sunil; Sruthi Lakshmi; Cochin Haneefa; Suraj Venjaramoodu; Mallika Sukumaran
- Cinematography: K. P. Nambiathiri
- Edited by: Raja Mohammad
- Music by: Alex Paul
- Release date: 25 December 2007
- Country: India
- Language: Malayalam

Romeo is a 2007 Malayalam romantic comedy film written by Rafi Mecartin and directed by Rajasenan, starring Dileep, Vimala Raman, Samvrutha Sunil,Sruthi Lakshmi ,Suraj Venjaramoodu,Cochin Haneefa and Mallika Sukumaran in the lead roles. Romeo was a box-office success.

== Plot ==
Manu Krishnan is a male nurse at a reputed hospital. He is the son of Ratheesh Kumar, a junior artist in films, and Lakshmikutty, an ex-singer and a judge in a reality show. He has a special relationship with Dr. Priya, but is also in love with Leena, the star contestant in a popular music reality show (where Manu's mother is one of the judges). Manu goes in search of a job and arrives at an Agraharam to take care of a mentally ill patient. A girl from the Agraharam, Bhama, falls in love with him. Now the three girls want to marry Manu but the parents of none of them want Manu as their son-in-law. The rest of the movie is about the trouble Manu goes through when the three meet, and whom he decides to marry.

== Cast ==
- Dileep as Manu Krishnan
- Vimala Raman as Dr. Priya, Manu's love interest
- Samvrutha Sunil as Leena, a singing contest winner
- Sruthi Lakshmi as Bhama, an Iyer girl who wants to become a singer
- Suraj Venjaramoodu as Prasanthan,Manu's friend
- Cochin Haneefa as Ratheesh Kumar, Manu's father and Prasanth's master
- Mallika Sukumaran as Lakshmikutty, Manu's mother and an ex-singer and reality show judge
- Salim Kumar as Naranimangalam Narayanan
- Ashokan as Subramanian, Manu's rival who fights for Bhama
- Madhu Warrier as Manuel as Leena's 5 years boyfriend
- Salu Kuttanadu as Passenger on the bus
- Murali Mohan as Jayaraj Menon, Priya's father
- Bheeman Raghu as Kurushammoottil Avarachan, Leena's father
- Ambika Mohan as Priya's mother
- Rizabawa as Ramanathan, Subramanian's mentally unstable father
- Kalabhavan Haneef as Vetoor Nath, Protest Leader
- Nandu Poduval as Father Gabriel
- Kalamandalam Geethanandan as Vaidyar
- Rema Devi C. as Bhama's mother
- Subbalakshmi as Bhama's grandmother

== Soundtrack ==
The songs were composed by Alex Paul, and the lyrics were written by Vayalar Sarath Chandra Varma.

Track #	Song	Artist(s)	Raga
1	"Kilichundan Mavin"	Afsal, Swetha Mohan	
2	"Kilichundan Mavin"	Swetha Mohan	
3	"Olikkunnu Ennalullil"	M. G. Sreekumar, Rimi Tomy	
4	"Paal Kadalil Uyarum"	M. K. Sankaran Namboothi, Manjari	Chalanata
5	"Paal Kadalil Uyarum"	Manjari	Chalanata
