= Sruthi Lakshmi =

Indian actress (born 1990)

- Born: Sruthi Jose; 8 September 1990 (age 36); Chundaparamba, Sreekandapuram, Kannur district, Kerala, India
- Occupation: Actress
- Years active: 2000–present
- Spouse: Avin Anto (m. 2016)
- Relatives: Sreelaya (sister)

Sruthi Jose (born 8 September 1990), better known by her screen name Sruthi Lakshmi, is an Indian actress acting mainly in Malayalam films and television serials. She is also a trained classical dancer. She is known for teleserial Pokkuveyil.

== Personal life ==
Sruthi Jose with the screen name Sruthi Lakshmi is born on 8 September 1990 to Jose and cine actress Lissy Jose at Chundaparamba village in Kannur district. Her father is from Kannur and mother is from Wayanad. She has an elder sister Sreelaya. She is a practicing catholic. After completing her +2 in Science from Government higher secondary school, Sreekandapuram she went to pursue graduation from Mar Ivanios College, Trivandrum. She is a trained classical dancer. Her elder sister Sreelaya acted in films Kutteem Kolum (2013), Maanikyam (2015), Compartment (2015) and serials Krishnakripasagaram on Amrita TV, Kanmani, Thenum Vayambum on Surya TV, Bhagyadevatha on Mazhavil Manorama, Moonumani on Flowers TV, Priyappettaval on Mazhavil Manorama. Currently they are settled at Kakkanad, Kochi. Sruthi married Dr. Avin Anto on 2 January 2016. Shruthi and her sister played lead roles in Surya TV serial Thenum Vayambum from 2018 to 2019.

== Career ==
Sruthi Lakshmi started her career as a child artist in the television serial Nizhalukal, written by Ranjith Sankar and telecasted in Asianet in 2000. She has also acted in television serials like Nakshathrangal, Detective Anand etc. She made her film debut by playing the character of Bhama, as one of the three heroines, in the film Romeo (2007) opposite Dileep. She has acted in few albums and attended in popular talk shows like Nammal Thammil (Asianet), Youth Club (Asianet), Sreekandannair Show (Surya TV) etc. She participated in a popular reality show Star Challenge on Flowers TV.

== Filmography ==
=== Films ===
- All films in Malayalam unless otherwise noted

List of Sruthi Lakshmi film credits
Year	Film	Character	Notes
2000	Swayamvara Panthal	Deepu's niece	Child artist
2000	Varnakkazhchakal	Kunju's niece	Child artist
2000	Kharaaksharangal		Child artist
2004	Swarna Medal	Chinnu	Child artist Shot in 2002
2005	Maanikyan	Geethanjali	Child artist
2007	Rakshakan		
2007	Romeo	Bhama	
2008	College Kumaran	Radha	
2009	Bharya Swantham Suhruthu	Teena	
2009	Dalamarmarangal	Rohini	
2009	Love In Singapore	Vinnie	
2010	Plus Two	Dancer	Special appearance in the song
2010	Swantham Bharya Zindabad	Meenakshi	
2010	Holidays	Lekha Paul	
2011	Pachuvum Kovalanum	Priyanka	
2011	Veeraputhran	Haseena	
2011	101 Uruppika	Nandhini	
2011	Aazhakadal	Kochurani	
2011	Kanneerinum Madhuram	Seetha	
2011	Lavakumar 1984	Anjana	
2011	Sundara Kalyanam	Ruksana	
2011	Bangkok Summer	Raziya	
2011	Themmadi Pravu	–	
2011	Arayan		
2012	Paaraseega Mannan	–	Tamil
2013	Hotel California	Linda Tharakan	
2014	Mizhi Thurakku	Savithri	
2015	Pathemari	Smitha	
2015	Mahaprabhu	–	
2015	One Second Please	–	
2016	Ithu Thaanda Police	CPO Mumthas	
2019	Kettyolaanu Ente Malakha	Richard's wife	
2020	Al Mallu	Singer/Dancer	

=== Television series ===
List of Sruthi Lakshmi television series credits
Year	Title	Channel	Role	Notes
2000	Nizhalukal	Asianet		Child artist
2001	Nakshathrangal	Asianet		Child artist
2002	Chithralekha	Asianet		Child artist
2002	Detective Anand	Doordarshan		Child artist
2016	Pokkuveyil	Flowers TV	Isha Aravind/Sruthi Aravind	debut as lead actress
2017–2018	Avaril Oraal	Surya TV	Ishita	
2018–2019	Thenum Vayambum	Surya TV	Karthika	
2019–2020	Kathayariyathe	Flowers TV	Nimisha	
2021–2022	Nee Varuvai Ena	Raj TV	Gowri	Tamil serial
2022	Swantham Sujatha	Surya TV	Angel	Cameo
2022	Namma Madurai Sisters	Colors Tamil	Indhrani	Tamil serial

=== Television shows ===
List of Sruthi Lakshmi television show credits
Year	Title	Channel	Role	Notes
2009	Ente Priyaganangal	Surya TV	Host	Music show
2012	Super Dancer Junior	Amrita TV	Dancer	Reality show
2013	Puthumukha Nayika Vasantham	Surya TV	Host	Special show
2014	Lets Dance Season 2	Amrita TV	Judge	Reality show
2014–2015	Lets Dance Season 3	Amrita TV	Judge	Reality show
2015	Nammal Thammil	Asianet	Panelist	Talk show
2015	Star Challenge	Flowers TV	Contestant	Reality show
2018	Super Jodi	Surya TV	Contestant	Reality show
2018	Thakarppan Comedy	Mazhavil Manorama	Contestant	Reality show
2018	Thakarppan Comedy Mimicry Mahamela	Mazhavil Manorama	Mentor	Reality show
2018–2019	Dance Kerala Dance	Zee Keralam	Mentor	Reality show
2019	Page 3	Kappa TV	Model	Photoshoot
2021	Comedy Utsavam	Flowers TV	Host	Comedy show
2021	Red Carpet	Amrita TV	Mentor	Reality show
2021	Mahduram Shobhanam	Zee Keralam	Dancer	Special show
2022	Salt and Pepper	Kaumudy TV	Presenter in a special episode	Cookery show
2022	Comedy stars season 3	Asianet	Celebrity Judge	Reality show
2022	Top Singer season 2	Flowers TV	Celebrity Judge	Music show
2023	Bigg Boss	Asianet	Contestant	Reality show
