= Balachandran Chullikkad =

Malayalam poet, actor

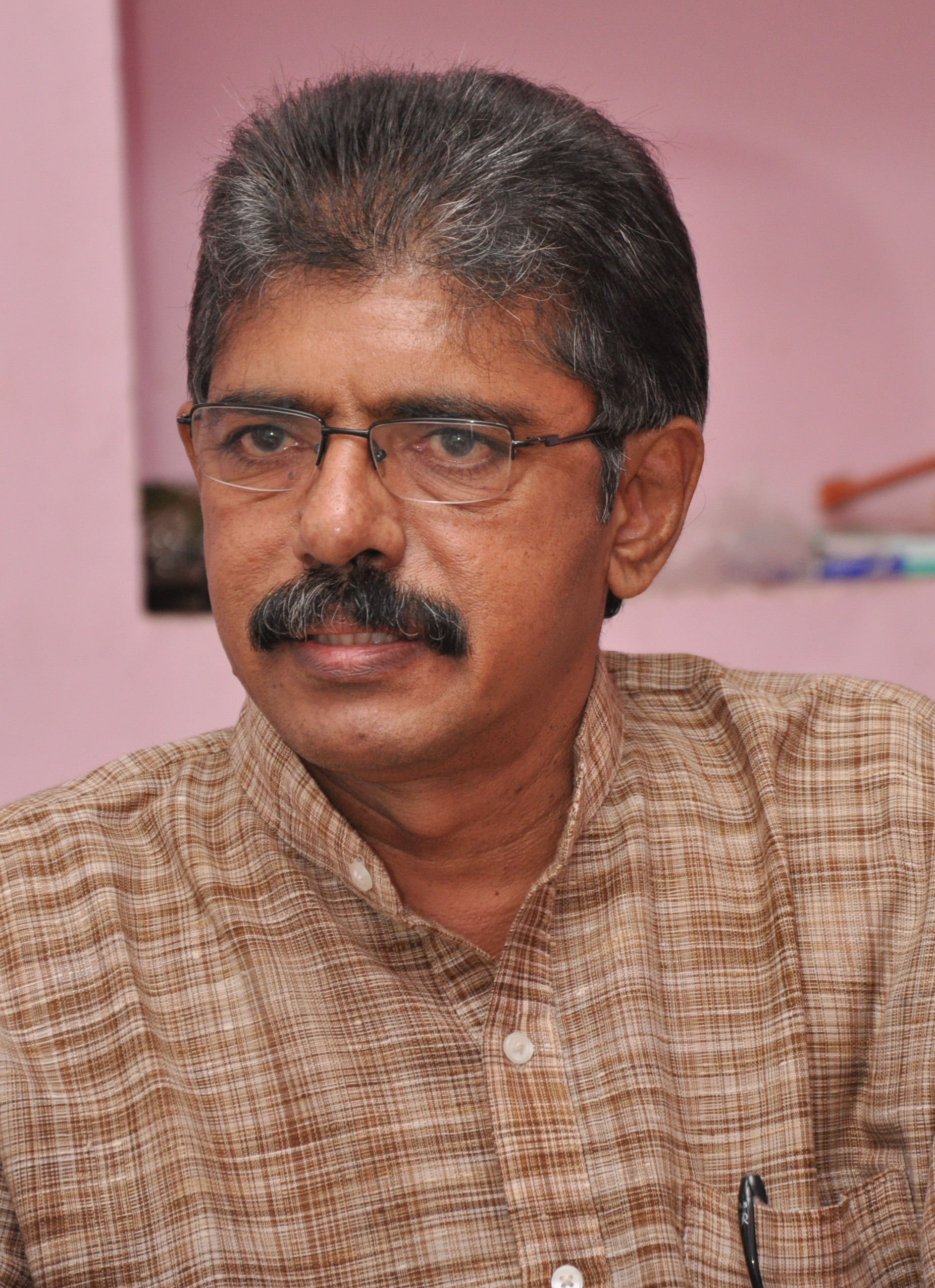
- Balachandran Chullikkad
- Born: S. Balachandran; 30 July 1957 (age 69); Paravoor, Kerala, India
- Occupations: Poet; actor; lyricist; screenwriter
- Spouse: Vijayalakshmi
- Children: 1

Balachandran Chullikkad (born 30 July 1957) is an Indian poet, orator, lyricist and actor in Malayalam-language media.

== Early life ==
Balachandran was born in Paravur, Ernakulam, Kerala, India. He completed his graduation in English literature from the Union Christian College, Aluva (first two years) and Maharajas College, Ernakulam.

== Career ==
His collection of poems published includes Pathinettu Kavithakal, Amaavaasi, Ghazal, Maanasaantharam, Dracula etc. Another collection of his previously published poems, Balachandran Chullikkadinte Kavithakal (The Poems of Balachandran Chullikkad), was published in 2000. He has also published a book of his memoirs, Chidambarasmarana (2001).

He has participated in many national literary seminars organised by the Central Academy of Letters, India. He was one among the ten members of a cultural delegation of India to Sweden in 1997 invited by Nobel Academy and Swedish Writers Union. He represented Indian poetry in the international bookfair in Gothenburg, Sweden in November 1997.

Chullikkad is also an actor in Malayalam films and serials. As an actor, he is best known for G. Aravindan's Pokkuveyil (1981) in which he played a young artist who lives with his father, a radical friend and a music-loving young woman. The film is about how his world collapses when his father dies, the radical friend leaves him and her family takes the woman away to another city.

In 2018, he criticised the state education department for their incompetency in teaching Malayalam language. He urged it to remove his poems from curricula in schools, colleges and universities. Chullikkadu alleged that marks were being given in abundance for papers containing mistakes without proper evaluation, and the appointment of Malayalam teachers are not on the basis of qualifications, but caste, religion, political influence and nepotism. He said research work on Malayalam literature lack quality and that doctoral degrees were conferred on even those works which contain mistakes.

== Personal life ==
Chullikkad is married to Vijayalakshmi, a known Malayalam poet and they have a son named Appu.

In 2000, he took Buddhism as his religion. He says that this cannot be called a conversion from Hinduism because he was never a follower of that religion. "I have not converted because I have not been a believer though I was a Hindu. I have now embraced Buddhism, not converted to Buddhism. The problem with Hinduism is that it is a religion of social status and set-ups. Your value in Hinduism depends on the family in which you were born," he says.

=== Political views ===
In a 2000 interview, Chullikkad revealed that he was a sympathiser of the Naxalite movement during his teenage years. He then continued as a Marxist for some years. But after the fall of the Soviet Union and "the Eastern European experience", he rethought his conviction about Marxism and reorganised his intellectual life on a different path. "I found that Marxism is outdated and irrelevant. Now I am not a Marxist, but a social and political democrat. Soviet experience proved that individual freedom without the base of socialism and socialism without sanctioning individual freedom is a failure. Communism practised all over the world is some kind of socialism without sanctioning individual freedom. Communism without approving individual freedom is social fascism", he said.

== Awards ==
In 1990, he refused the Sanskriti Award for the best young writer in India and declared that he would not accept any award for his literary works. In 2001, his work Balachandran Chullikkadinte Kavithakal was selected for the Kerala Sahitya Akademi Award for Poetry, but Chullikkad did not accept the award. In 2003, he received the National Film Award for Best Non-Feature Film Narration / Voice Over (Non Feature Film Category) for The 18 Elephants – 3 Monologues.

== Bibliography ==
=== Poetry ===
- Pathinettu Kavithakal (Trichur: Rasana, 1980)
- Amavasi (Kottayam: S.P.C.S., 1982)
- Ghazal (Kottayam: DC Books, 1987)
- Ente Sachidanandan Kavithakal (Calicut: Bodhi, 1993)
- Manasantharam (Trichur: Current, 1994)
- Dracula (Kottayam: DC Books, 1998)
- Balachandran Chullikkadinte Kavithakal (Kottayam: DC Books, 2000)
- Prathinayakan (Kottayam: DC Books, 2013)
- Balachandran Chullikkadinte Kavitha Paribhashakal (Kottayam: DC Books, 2013) (Note: Translation of poems by Pablo Neruda, Charles Baudelaire, Rabindranath Tagore, Tennyson etc.)
- Rakthakinnaram (Kottayam: DC Books, 2017)
- Alakal (Calicut: Mathrubhumi, 2021)
- Ulkkakal (Kozhikode: Mathrubhumi, 2024)
- Marakkamo (DC Books, 2024)

=== Others ===
- Chidambarasmarana (Alwaye: Pen, 1998, memoirs)
- Hiranyam (Kottayam: DC Books, 2019, short novel) (Note: First published in 1977 in Veekshanam Varshikapathippu)

== Filmography ==
=== Films ===
==== As Actor ====
Year	Title	Role	Notes
1982	Pokkuveyil		
1987	Ezhuthapurangal	Balan	
1987	Theertham	Shivan	
1988	Marikkunnilla Njaan		
1994	Pradakshinam		
1994	Sraadham		
2005	Rappakal	Deva Narayanan	
2005	Maanikyan	Himself	Cameo
2005	The Tiger	Dr. Bharathan Kumar	
2005	Nerariyan CBI	Thirumeni	
2005	Bharathchandran I.P.S.	Mudoor Sidhan	
2006	Chinthamani Kolacase	Sathyan Master	
2006	Aanachandam	Vishwanathan	
2006	Vaasthavam		
2007	Ali Bhai	Collector Sukumaran Nair	
2007	Abraham & Lincoln		
2007	Nasrani	Adv. Mathews	
2008	One Way Ticket	Balan Master	
2008	Parunthu	Abraham	
2008	Oridathoru Puzhayundu	Comrade Dasettan	
2008	Minnaminnikoottam	Appukuttan Maashu	
2008	Pakal Nakshatrangal		
2008	Roudram	Doctor Surendran	
2009	Kali		
2009	Evidam Swargamanu	Elias	
2009	Vellathooval		
2009	Sagar Alias Jacky Reloaded		
2009	Samastha Keralam PO	Balagangadharan	
2009	Patham Nilayile Theevandi	Board member	
2009	Chattambinadu	Kattappilly Cheriya Kuruppu	
2009	Madhya Venal		
2009	Vairam: Fight for Justice		
2009	Ivar Vivahitharayal		
2010	Drona 2010	Nelloor Karanavar	
2010	Pokkiri Raja		
2010	Amma Nilaavu		
2010	Sadgamaya		
2010	Body Guard		
2010	Elsamma Enna Aankutty	Dr. Stephen Tharakan	
2010	Sakudumbam Shyamala		
2010	Pranchiyettan & the Saint	Ajay Nambiar	
2011	Ithu Nammude Katha	Advocate	
2011	Three Kings	Shankaran Unni Raja's father	
2011	August 15	Vasudevan	
2011	Collector		
2011	Bombay March 12		
2012	Orkut Oru Ormakoot		
2012	Naughty Professor		
2012	Ayalum Njanum Thammil	Murali	
2012	Mayamohini	Shankaradi Melpathoor	
2012	Thattathin Marayathu		
2012	Last Bench	Vinyan	
2012	916	Narayanan	
2013	Sound Thoma	Dr. George Joseph	
2013	Bharya Athra Pora	Rajendran	
2013	August Club		
2013	White Paper		
2013	Lokpal	Ashraf	
2013	Immanuel	Madhavettan	
2013	Proprietors: Kammath & Kammath	Sathyaneshan	
2013	Namboothiri Yuvavu @ 43		
2013	Kadal Kadannu Oru Maathukutty	Shamsu	
2013	Nadodimannan	KRP	
2013	Omega.exe		
2013	Silence		
2013	Pigman		
2013	Kaattum Mazhayum		Unreleased
2014	Cousins	Varkey Master	
2014	The Dolphins		
2014	Pranayakadha		
2014	Kootathil Oral		
2014	Manja	Abhayaraj's friend	
2014	Mr. Fraud	Adv. Idiculla	
2014	On The Way		
2014	Thomson Villa		
2014	Parayan Baaki Vechathu		
2014	Ringmaster		
2014	Onnum Mindathe		
2015	Kumbasaram		
2015	Mashithandu		
2015	Oru New Generation Pani		
2015	Onnam Loka Mahayudham		
2015	Tharakangale Sakshi		
2015	Ellam Chettante Ishtam Pole		
2015	32aam Adhyayam 23aam Vaakyam	Noaha	
2015	Two Countries	Kanaran Master	
2016	Action Hero Biju	Paulachan	
2016	Kolamass		
2016	Pachakallam		
2016	King Liar	Paraparambil Narayanan Nair	
2016	Welcome to Central Jail	Khader	
2017	Hello Dubaikkaran		
2017	Sathya		
2017	Aakashamittayee	Himself	
2017	Role Models	College Principal	
2017	Vishwa Vikhyatharaya Payyanmar	Govindan Master	
2018	Marubhoomiyile Mazhathullikal		
2018	Aami	Himself	
2018	Ottakoru Kaamukan	Older Dominic	
2018	Neeli		
2018	Mohanlal	Hari	
2018	Ira	Judge	
2018	Oru Pazhaya Bomb Kadha	Rohith Shetty	
2018	Thanaha		
2019	Janaadhipan	Swamy	
2019	Madhura Raja	Adv. Mohandas	
2019	Children's Park	Rishi's father	
2019	Thrissur Pooram	Adv. Jayamohan	
2021	Ice Orathi		
2021	Bheeshma Parvam	Girija Achari	
2022	Naradan	Vijayan	
2023	Sesham Mike-il Fathima	Himself	
2025	L Jagadamma Ezham Class B		
2025	Aabhyanthara Kuttavaali	Sahadevan's father	
2025	Flask		
2026	Bharathanatyam 2 Mohiniyattam	Sathyan	
2026	Mollywood Times	Vineeth's grandfather	

==== Screenwriter ====
Year	Title	Notes
1987	Jaalakam	Story, screenplay and dialogues
1987	Idanazhiyil Oru Kaalocha	Story and dialogues
1988	Oozham	Story and screenplay
1990	Orukkam	Story
1994	Pradakshinam	Story

=== Television ===
Year	Title	Role	Notes
2024-Present	Snehapoorvam Shyama	Zee Keralam	
2023–2024	Anuraga Ganam Pole	Zee Keralam	
2022–2023	Amma Makal	Zee Keralam	
2022–2023	Thoovalsparsham (TV series)	Asianet	
2020–2023	Thinkalkalamaan	Surya TV	
2019–2020	Chackoyum Maryyum	Mazhavil Manorama	
2019–2021	Sumangali Bhava	Zee Keralam	
2018–2020	Bhagyajathakam	Mazhavil Manorama	
2018	Gauri	Surya TV	
2017	Seetha	Flowers TV	
2017–2018	Ammuvinte Amma	Mazhavil Manorama	
2016–2017	Pokkuveyil	Flowers TV	
2016	Mayamohini	Mazhavil Manorama	
2015	Karuthamuthu	Asianet	
2015	Ganga	Doordarshan	
2014	Balamani	Mazhavil Manorama	
2013	Eran Nilav	Doordarshan	
2011	Chila Nerangalil Chila Manushyar	Amrita TV	
2011–2012	Kathayile Rajakumari	Mazhavil Manorama	
2010	Indhraneelam	Surya TV	
2010	Devimahathmyam	Asianet	
2009–2010	Vadakaikkoru Hridayam	Amrita TV	
2009	Pookalam	Surya TV	title song lyrics
2008–2009	Priyamanasi	Surya TV	
2008	Thulabharam	Surya TV	
2008	Meera	Asianet	
2007	Makalude Amma	Surya TV	
	Mizhi Thurakkumbol	Surya TV	
	Venalmazha	Surya TV	
	Parvanendu		
	Swapnagale Kaaval	Kairali TV	
	Mizhi Thurakkumo	Doordarshan	

=== Web series ===
Year	Title	Role	Notes
2024	Jai Mahendran	Rtd Tahasildar Shibu	

== Discography ==
=== Lyricist ===
Song / Poem	Film	Year	Singer / Notes
"Amme Pinvili Vilikkaathe"	Pokkuveyil	1982	
"Oru Ormmathan"	Pokkuveyil	1982	
"Nimishamaam"	Sruthi	1987	S. Janaki
"Leelaaravindam"	Sruthi	1987	K. J. Yesudas
"Cheekithirukiya"	Sruthi	1987	K. J. Yesudas
"Onam Vannu" (Bit)	Sruthi	1987	
"Ganapathiye Nin Achan"	Theertham	1987	
"Aathintho"	Theertham	1987	
"Bas More Nainan"	Theertham	1987	
"Paampu Kadicha"	Ezhuthaappurangal	1987	
"Kaanaamarayathu"	Pradakshinam	1994	
"Indrasabha"	Abraham & Lincoln	2007	
"Thakkida Tharikida"	Abraham & Lincoln	2007	
"Swapnamaraalike"	Abraham & Lincoln	2007	
"Kezhamaan Kannaale"	Abraham & Lincoln	2007	
"Uduraajamukhi"	Abraham & Lincoln	2007	
"Raagam Shokam"	Thaniye	2007	
"Choodathe Poyi Nee"	1983	2014	
"Arikilundu Njaanengilum"	Poomaram	2018	
"Ore Sooryanalle"	Poomaram	2018	
"Choodathe Poyi Nee"	Etham	2022	
"Janmanaattil Chennu Vandiyirangave"	Zha	2024	

=== Playback singer ===
Song	Film	Year	Notes
"Poothappaattu"	Chillu	1982	
"Amme Pinvili Vilikkaathe"	Pokkuveyil	1982	Also composer
"Joseph, Oru Ormmathan"	Pokkuveyil	1982	Also composer
"Paampu Kadicha"	Ezhuthaappurangal	1987	Also composer
"Idavamaasa Perumazha"	Makalkku	2005	
"Ottakkirikkunnu"	Mashithandu	2015	
"Enikku Nere"	Oppam	2016	

== See also ==
- Malayalam literature
- List of Malayalam-language authors
