= Amma Makal =

Indian Malayalam-language soap opera

- Genre: Soap opera
- Screenplay by: K.V Anil
- Directed by: Faisal Adimali; AM Naseer
- Starring: Mithra Kurian; Mariya Prince; Rajeev Roshan; Sreejith Vijay
- Country of origin: India
- Original language: Malayalam
- No. of seasons: 1
- No. of episodes: 282

Production
- Producers: Modi Mathew; Jayachandran
- Editor: Ajith Raj Arinalloor
- Camera setup: Multi-camera
- Running time: 20-25 minutes
- Production company: Classic Frames

Original release
- Network: Zee Keralam
- Release: 25 October 2021 – 9 September 2022

Amma Makal (transl. Mother, daughter) is an Indian Malayalam-language soap opera. The show was premiered on 25 October 2021 on Zee Keralam and streams on-demand through ZEE5. It stars Mithra Kurian, Mariya Prince, Rajeev Roshan and Sreejith Vijay. The show is the television debut of the film actress Mithra Kurian.

== Synopsis ==
Anu and her mother share the purest mother-daughter bond, but when Anu realises that her mother's priorities are changing, her extremist behaviour creates ruffles in the relationship.

== Cast ==
=== Main ===
- Mithra Kurian as Sangeetha
- Mariya Prince as Anu Nanda
- Rajeev Roshan as Nandan
- Sreejith Vijay as Dr. Vipin Vallabhan

=== Recurring ===
- Sindhu Varma as Lekshmi
- Jishin Mohan as Praveen
- Yamuna
- Mohan Ayroor
- Indira Thampi as Parameshwaran
- Thushara as Achu
- Balachandran Chullikkadu as Govindan Maash
- Sadhika Venugopal as Dr. Hemalatha
- Manka Mahesh as Maheshwari
- Chilanka S Dheedu as Nilima
- Swapna Tresa as Vaiga
- Pramod Mani as Prathapan
- Sreelekshmi Haridas as Divyapraba
- Ranjith Raj
- Vimal Raj
- Divyachandralekha as Shakti Parvathi

== Production ==
=== Filming ===
A boat mishap sequence was shot in Ashtamudi Lake. Such a sequence was filmed for the first time in Malayalam television. The show's director, A.M. Naseer, said, "We had the chance to shoot in the shallow areas of the lake but it lacked quality. So, we decided to shoot it in the middle of Ashtamudi. We almost shot the entire day with perfection."

=== Casting ===
The film actress Mithra Kurian plays the protagonist, Sangeetha, in her television debut. Sangeetha's college-going daughter, Anu, is played by debutant Mariya Prince while her husband, Nandan is played by Rajeev Roshan. Sreejith Vijay plays the male lead as Dr. Vipin Vallabhan. Yamuna, Jishin Mohan, Sindhu Varma, Manka Mahesh, Balachandran Chullikkadu, Mohan Ayroor and Indira Thampi were cast in pivotal roles. Sadhika Venugopal made an extended cameo as Dr. Hemalatha.

The show is written by K.V. Anil and directed by Faisal Adimali. It is produced by Modi Mathew and Jayachandran under the name of Classic Frames. Adimali was later replaced by A.M. Naseer.

=== Broadcast ===
The first promotional video of Amma Makal featuring the lead actresses Kurian and Prince was released in October 2021. The show was premiered on Zee Keralam on 25 October 2021 and shown every day at the 9:00 p.m. IST. On the digital platform, it is available for viewing on ZEE5.

On 5 June 2022, a one-hour episode of the show was broadcast on Zee Keralam at 7.00 pm IST.

== Soundtrack ==
Original Songs
No.	Title	Lyrics	Music	Singer(s)	Length
1.	"Janmangal Theeruvolam Amma Kunje"	Jyothish T. Kashi	Alphonse Joseph	Swetha Ashok, Anu Thomas	2:13
Total length:					2:13

== Reception ==
Reviewing the first episode of the show, a reviewer for The Times of India was impressed with the "refreshing star cast and novel storyline" and thought that "the show has managed to evoke an element of suspense among the viewers within the first episode". However, the cliched and non-progressive scenes were criticised.

In a poll conducted on the official Instagram account of ETimes TV to pick the best entertainer between Daya: Chentheeyil Chalicha Kumkumapottu and Amma Makal, 78% of the respondents voted in favour of Daya.
