= Vadakakku Oru Hridayam =

1978 film directed by I. V. Sasi

- A Heart for Hire
- Directed by: I. V. Sasi
- Screenplay by: Padmarajan
- Based on: Vadakakkoru Hridayam by Padmarajan
- Produced by: Hari Pothan
- Starring: Jayabharathi; Madhu; Soman; Raghavan
- Cinematography: Ramachandra Babu
- Edited by: K. Narayanan
- Music by: Devarajan
- Production company: Supriya Creations
- Distributed by: Navasakthi; Ajantha
- Release date: 15 June 1978
- Country: India
- Language: Malayalam

Vadakakku Oru Hridayam (English: A Heart for Hire) is a 1978 Malayalam film, directed by I. V. Sasi and written by Padmarajan. The film is based on Padmarajan's novel of the same name. It stars Jayabharathi, Madhu, Soman and Raghavan in the lead roles. It was dubbed and released in Hindi as Man Ka Aangan. In 2009, the film was remade into a Malayalam TV serial with the same title and aired on Amrita TV.

== Plot ==
Aswathi is the daughter of Paramupilla, a farmer and an honest man. Kesavankutty is an unemployed politician. Kesavankutty and Aswathi grew up in the same place.Gradually they fell in love. But Paramupilla was against their marriage. Paramupilla arranged marriage of Aswathi and Parameswaran Pillai, who was rich and a big cultivator. Ashwati realized that her husband was a eunuch only when the days passed. One day Kesavankutty went to meet Aswathi. Then she told him the sad story of her broken life. From then on they became closer to each other. From Kesavankutty she began to enjoy sexual life .One day, Aswathi and Kesavankutty were making love, n her husband, Parameswaran Pillai, came. Parameswaran Pillai, who witnessed it, did not utter a single word. She felt guilty. One day she left her husband for Kesavankutty. Kesavankutty's mother accepted her as daughter-in-law. After his wife left him, Parameswaran Pillai became a drunkard . Sadashivanpillai, a businessman, had expressed interest in marrying Aswathi in the past. However, the marriage did not occur as Aswathi did not reciprocate his feelings. Nevertheless, he continues to harbor strong feelings for Aswathi.Ashwati became pregnant. Her parents brought her home for delivery. After giving birth, they did not send her to Kesavankutty's house. She was helpless . Kesavankutty was angry and started a relationship with an actress.Ashwati's child is now two years old. Sadashivan Pillai, a previous suitor of Ashwati, has returned with a marriage proposal. Despite her lack of romantic feelings for him, she has accepted the proposal.He was willing to do anything for Ashwati. But she couldn't think of anyone but Kesavankutty. She openly told Sadashivan Pillai that. Sadasiva Pillai was saddened and took pity on him on behalf of Aswati.He cursed himself. That thought bothered him so much that he committed suicide in remorse.Ashwati became orphan again. Will Ashwati's parents take her back home? Will the mother of Sadashivanpillai, who lost her own son, accept Aswathi who expressed her desire to live with Kesavankutty, the father of her child

== Soundtrack ==
The music was composed by G. Devarajan and the lyrics were written by Kavalam Narayana Panicker.

No.	Song	Singers	Lyrics	Length (m:ss)
1	"Ozhinja Veedin"	K. J. Yesudas	Kavalam Narayana Panicker	
2	"Painkuraalippashuvin"	P. Madhuri	Kavalam Narayana Panicker	
3	"Poovaamkuzhali"	K. J. Yesudas, Chorus	Kavalam Narayana Panicker	
4	"Theyyaathi Nunthinuntho"	P. Jayachandran, P. Madhuri, Chorus	Kavalam Narayana Panicker	

== Box office ==
The film was both a critical and commercial success.
