= Jeevan TV =

- Logo used since 2002
- Country: India
- Headquarters: Kochi, Kerala

Programming
- Picture format: 576i SDTV

Ownership
- Owner: Somatheeram Group

History
- Launched: 14 July 2002; 24 years ago

Links
- Website: www.jeevannewsonline.com

Jeevan TV is an Indian Malayalam language free to air news and entertainment channel owned by Somatheeram Group. Its headquarters is at Palarivattom, Kochi, India. Jeevan TV first aired its news and entertainment programs on 14 July 2002.
