= JaiHind TV =

Indian Malayalam-language television channel

Jaihind TV
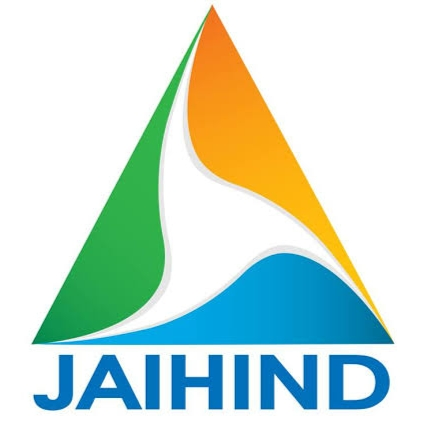
- Logo used since 2007
- Country: India
- Broadcast area: India
- Headquarters: Thiruvananthapuram, Kerala, India

Programming
- Picture format: 576i SDTV

Ownership
- Owner: Bharat Broadcasting Network Ltd
- Key people: Ramesh Chennithala (Chairman)

History
- Launched: 17 August 2007; 19 years ago

Links
- Website: www.jaihindtv.in

Jaihind TV is an Indian Malayalam language free-to-air news and entertainment channel. owned by Bharat Broadcasting Network Limited. it was launched on 17 August 2007, in Delhi by the Indian National Congress then President and United Progressive Alliance Chairperson Sonia Gandhi.

This channel is promoted by the Indian National Congress with the support of non-resident Indians. Aniyan Kutty, is the Chairman of the Channel.
