= DD Malayalam =

Indian Malayalam-language public TV channel

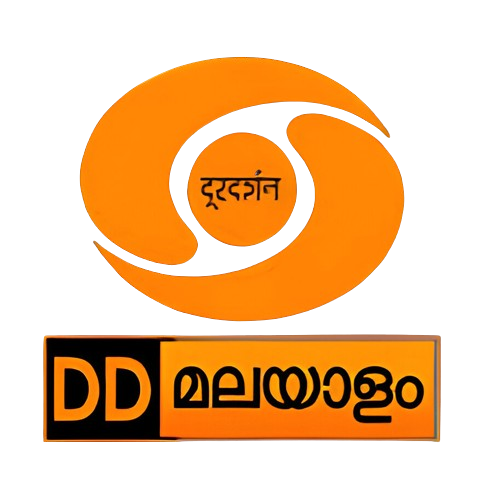
- Logo used since 2025
- Type: Television Channel
- Country: India
- Network: Doordarshan
- Headquarters: Thiruvananthapuram, Kerala, India

Programming
- Language: Malayalam
- Picture format: 1080i HDTV

Ownership
- Owner: Prasar Bharati

History
- Launched: 1 January 1985; 41 years ago
- Founder: Government of India
- Former names: DD 4

Links
- Website: www.prasarbharati.gov.in/dd-malayalam/

Availability

Streaming media
- Waves: DD Malayalam
- JioTV: DD Malayalam

DD Malayalam is an Indian Malayalam-language free to air television channel operated by Doordarshan, India's national broadcaster. Originally known as DD4, the channel was rebranded as DD Malayalam after 1995. It serves as one of the 11 regional language channels run by Doordarshan, catering specifically to the Malayalam-speaking population.

The channel operates from its headquarters located in Kudappanakunnu, a suburb of Thiruvananthapuram, the capital city of Kerala. As a regional broadcaster, DD Malayalam plays a pivotal role in disseminating information, entertainment, and educational content tailored to the cultural and linguistic identity of Kerala.

The channel broadcasts through satellite in the name DD Malayalam and through terrestrial in the name DD Malayalam. The channel has its main studio in Thiruvananthapuram and an auxiliary studio in Kochi. In terrestrial mode, DD Malayalam is available to 99.2% of the population of Kerala. The satellite broadcast was started in 1994 and the High Definition version of this channel started on 23 September 2025 through GSAT-17 satellite.

== History ==
Though television made its entry in India on 15 September 1959, it took a quarter of a century to speak the language of most literate state of India - Kerala. The television broadcast in Malayalam -the language of Kerala - under the legacy of Doordarshan was formally launched by the then Chief Minister of Kerala K. Karunakaran on 1 January 1985 at Tagore Centenary Hall, Thiruvananthapuram, the capital city of Kerala.

The first ever television programme in Malayalam was a children's play entitled Oru Koottam Urumbukal-ഒരു കൂട്ടം ഉറുമ്പുകൾ (A Group of Ants) presented by Rangaprabhath Children's Theatre, Venjarammoodu, Kerala under the leadership of Kochunarayana Pillai. The play was written by writer and academic in Malayalam Drama, G. Sankara Pillai. This first ever television programme in Malayalam was directed and produced by A. Anwar. Oru Koottam Urumbukal was aired at 6:30PM on 2 January 1985. The duration of this children's play was 15 minutes.

Initially there was a broadcast in Malayalam for just 70 minutes daily from 6:30PM to 7:40PM. The first ever news bulletin Malayalam (വാർത്തകൾ) was aired live at 7:30PM on 2 January 1985. This live bulletin was produced by T. Chamiyar and presented by G. R. Kannan. The text and visual contents were edited by Baiju Chandran, A. Anwar and P. K. Mohanan.

There were a score of programmes in a week specifically targeted to special audience as well as general public. Among them the most popular were Vaarthakal-വാർത്തകൾ (News in Malayalam), Chithrageetham-ചിത്രഗീതം (Malayalam Movie Songs), Malayala Chalachithram-മലയാള ചലച്ചിത്രം (Movie in Malayalam), Poomottukal-പൂമൊട്ടുകൾ (Children's Prograamme), Arogyavedi-ആരോഗ്യ വേദി (Health Magazine), Sindooram-സിന്ദൂരം (Women's Magazine), Padavukal-പടവുകൾ (Development Program), Kalikkalam-കളിക്കളം (Sports Magazine), Yuvadarshanam-യുവദർശനം (Youth Magazine) and Rainbow (English Magazine).

The premier band of Programme Producers in Malayalam Television comprise T. Chamiyar, G. Sajan, C. K. Thomas, John Samuel, S. Venu, Baiju Chandran, M. A. Dilip, A. Anwar, R. Shyamaprasad, P. K. Mohanan, G. Jayakumar and T. N. Latha Mony.

The first ever tele-serial in Malayalam was a joint production of Doordarshan and UNICEF entitled Oru Poo Viriyunnu-ഒരു പൂ വിരിയുന്നു (A Flower Blossoms) which went on air in 1989. The serial was written and directed by Eravi Gopalan, A. Anwar and P. K. Mohanan.

There were many classic productions in Malayalam television was born under the banner of Doordarshan - the Public Service Broadcaster of India. Among them the following are the productions that still persist its dominance in the small screen: Venalinte Ozhivu-വേനലിൻ്റെ ഒഴിവ് (Telefilm, Story-Madhavikutty, Directed by Shyamaprasad), Peruvazhiyile Kariyilakal- പെരുവഴിയിലെ കരിയിലകൾ (Telefilm, Directed by Shyamaprasad) Blood-stained Allies of the Yore (Documentary, Directed by Baiju Chandran) Uyarthezhunelpu-ഉയർത്തെഴുനേൽപ്പ്‌ (Telefilm, Directed by Shyamaprasad), Viswa Vikhyaathamaaya Mookku-വിശ്വവിഖ്യാതമായ മൂക്ക് (Drama, Story-Vaikom Muhammad Basheer, Directed by Shyamaprasad), Snehathinte Mullukal-സ്നേഹത്തിന്റെ മുള്ളുകൾ (Telefilm, Story- N. Mohanan, Directed by A. Anwar), Ragging - Crime & Punishment-റാഗിങ്: കുറ്റവും ശിക്ഷയും (Documentary, Directed by A.Anwar)'Ithente Mannu, Ithente Thaalam'-ഇതെൻറെ മണ്ണ്, ഇതെൻറെ താളം (Musical Feature, Directed by A.Anwar), Hamlet of Mountain Monarch-വരയാടുകളുടെ ലോകം (Documentary, Directed by A.Anwar), Golden Dream-സുവർണ്ണ സ്വപ്നം (Children's Programme, Directed by A. Anwar), Prathiknjaa-പ്രതിജ്ഞ (Telefilm, Story- P. Kesavadev, Directed by A.Anwar), Madhuram Madhuram-മധുരം, മധുരം (Patriotic Song, Written by Rafeeq Ahamed, Directed by A. Anwar) and Sooraj ke Pahale (Patriotic Song, Written by K. J. Singh, directed by A. Anwar).

While private channels are set their target to gather more commercial earnings than any other parameters of social development Doordarshan had relentlessly shown its social commitment for human development. DD Malayalam is no exception in this regard.

As part of public broadcaster Prasar Bharati’s nationwide strategy to wind up stations operating on the obsolete technology, Doordarshan shut down 11 analogue transmitting stations in Kerala.

== Programs ==
DD Malayalam has entertainment serials, infotainment programmes, news and current affairs, social programmes and film programmes as its major content. DD Malayalam news Varthakal from its inception in 1985 was popular among the viewers for its crisp and 'to-the-point' presentation. 'Varthakal' speaks the 'best Malayalam' among the Malayalam TV Channels.

== List of programmes broadcast on DD Malayalam ==
- Thavalam serial by Sunil Krishnan, Thiruvathira Tele Film Makers, Cast - Ashokan, Ratheena V. Raju
- Vaitharani (1986)-First Malayalam tele serial to broadcast in the history of Malayalam television
- Mikhayelinte Santhathikal (1993)
- Ambalakkra U.P. School
- Appooppanthaadi
- Arabikkadalinte Rani
- Aruna
- Ashwathy
- Diana (2000)
- Deshadanapakshi (1997)
- Orikkal Oru Venalkala Raathriyil
- Happy
- Nammal Oru Team
- Paliyatthacchan
- Muttathuvarki Kadhakal
- Melapadham (1996)
- Vinodashala (1995)
- Ezhu Mukhangal (1994)
- Rohini
- Kadha Parayunna Kannunkal
- Kallanum Kandakashani
- Kumilakal (1991)
- Samaganam
- Devamanohari Nee
- Iniyum Varum Pookkalam
- Rajaveedhi
- Karunalayam
- Koodumattam
- Naalukettu
- Kunjayyappan
- Mandan Kunju
- Maranam Durbhalam
- Koodaram
- Oru Kudayum Kunjupengalum
- Ladies Hostel
- Laksharchana
- Nilavariyunnu
- Pattolaponnu
- Indulekha
- Punnaykka Vikasana Corporation (1998)
- Oru Poo Viriyunnu (1987)
- Kairali Vilasam Ladge (1990)
- Pulari
- Velu Malu Circus
- Verukal (1996)
- Manasaputhri
- Indraneelam (1996)
- Draupadi
- Balyakal Smaranakal
- Manikyan
- Manjukalam Mohicha Penkutti
- Marmaram
- Jwalayayi (2000–2002)
- Detective Anand (2000)
- Manasi (1997–2000)
- Snehaseema (2000)
- Valayam (2001–2004)
- Sadasivante Kumbasaram
- Snehatheeram (2000)
- Scooter (1998)
- Seemantham (1998–1999)
- Thamarakuzhali (1998)
- Inakkampinakkam
- Sethuvinte Kadhakal (1999)
- Mohanam (1999)
- Veendum Jwalayayi (2006–2009)
- Suryodayam (2006)
- Sagaram (2005)
- Narmadi Pudava (2007)
- Aparichitha (2007–2008)
- Angadipaattu (2002–2004)
- Alakal (2003–2005)
- Chandrodayam (2004)
- Purappadu
- Vrithantham
- Mohangal
- Innathe Special
- Marmaram
- Deepanaalangalkkuchuttum
- Shararaanthal
- Sasneham (2009)
- Anuyathra
- Amma (2006)
- Niramala (1995)
- Shyamambaram (2005)
- Nizhalattam
- Thapasya (1995)
- Thalolam (2005)
- Yathra (2005)
- Sthree oru Punyam (2003)
- Pranayam
- Moonnumughamullakkannadi
- Chathurangam
- Anantham (2005)
- Agneyam
- Marubhoomiyil oru Pookalam (2000–2001)
- Neela Viriyitta Jalakam (1997)
- Vamsham (1997–1998)
- Agnishalabham
- Ishtam
- Thoovalsparsham (2014–2015)
- Manjuthirum munpe (2011)
- Eeran Nilavu (2015)
- Vazhvemayam (2015–2016)
- Ganga (2015)
- Avalariyathe (2015)
- Pambaram (1999–2002)
- Pakida Pakida Pambaram (2002–2006)
- Mothiram (2006-Telefilm)
- Rachiamma (2004-Telefilm)
- Olakkuda (1996-Telefilm)
- Manassammatham Thannatte (Telefilm)
- Yudham (Telefilm)
- Oru Manushyan (Telefilm)
- Poovapazham (1991-Telefilm)
- Lambo (1991-Telefilm)
- Sreeparvathiyude Paadham (Telefilm)
- Makal (Telefilm)
- Gagarajayogam
- Kurumthottikkumvatham
- Shesham Kazhchayil
- Thyagam (Telefilm)
- Kunjikkoonan
- Charulatha
- Radhamithram
- Magam
- Gandharvayamam
- Nadodikalyanam
- Neelamala
- Gopika
- Padavukal
- Hamsageetham
- om nama shivaya
- Oru nimisham
- shaktimaan
- sankda mojak jay hanuman
- ORITHAL (tele film)

| show name | First aired | Lastaired | Episode count |
|---|---|---|---|
| jwalayay | 2000 | 2002 | 500+ |
| Manasi | 1997 | 2000 | 240 |
| Narmadipudava | 2007 | 2008 | 390 |
| Aparichitha | 2007 | 2008 | 390 |
| Nizhalattam | 2007 | 2008 | 390 |
| kudumbam | 2007 | 2008 | 390 |
| Sasneham | 2007 | 2008 | 390 |
| Chandrodayam | 2003 | 2005 | 520 |
| valayam | 2001 | 2004 | 560 |
| Angadipaattu | 2002 | 2004 | 400+ |
| Manjuthirum munpe | 2014 | 2015 | 95 |
| Thoovalsparsham | 2014 | 2015 | 95 |
| Eeran nilavu | 2015 | 2015 | 100+ |
| Ganga | 2015 | 2015 | 100+ |
| Vazhvemayam | 2015 | 2015 | 100+ |
| Aval ariyathe | 2015 | 2015 | 100+ |

== Upcoming serials ==
- Dheera
- Mazhamukil pakshi
- Onningu vannenkil

== Non fictional shows ==
- Paithrukam -167 Weekly Eps
- Arogyavedi -501 Weekly Eps
- Poomottukal -603 Weekly Eps
- Arogya Bharatham -60 Weekly Eps
- Kaalpanikam -204 Weekly Eps
- Vartha Chithram -256 Weekly Eps
- Beauty Clinic -102 Weekly Eps
- Movie Mix -60 Weekly Eps
- Pranaya Mazha -26 Weekly Eps
- Bold and beautiful
- Beat the floor
- Foot print 4Gen
- Kilivathil
- Sargasangamam
- Krishidarshan
- Sutharya keralam
- Megha Ragam
- En Swaram
- Sallapam
- Sangeethika
- Chayakoottu
- Kasavutheeram
- Paithrukam
- Ruchi Malayalam
- Cinema Weekly
- Chithrageetham
- Cinemax
- Chembai Music Festival
- Kathakali
- Movie mix the most wanted
- Sahayi
- Crispy Bytes
- DD Thriller
- DD Music Plus
- Veettuvishesham
- Koottukari
- Rhythm of cookery
- Haritha vidyalayam
- Mayilpeeli
- Thiranottam
- Smrithilayam
- Arogyabharatham
- Ayur rekha
- Samoohyapadam
- Rangoli

== Legacy shows ==
- Oru Poo Viriyunnu (Malayalam: ഒരു പൂ വിരിയുന്നു, meaning: A Flower Blossoms), a public interest TV serial with 87% viewers' participation. Aired during late 1980s, in 13 weekly episodes.
- Vaitharani (1986) ' (Malayalam: വൈതരണി, meaning: ), - It is the first ever full-fledged story based serial in Malayalam.
- Kairalivilasam Ladge (Malayalam: കൈരളി വിലാസം 'ലാഡ്ജ് '), a satirical series aired in the early 1990s in 13 weekly episodes. The serial starred M. S. Thripunithura and Nedumudi Venu.
- Jwalayayi (2000–2002) - A tele serial
- Chithrageetham (1985–2019) - film songs related show
- Giant Robo, a Japanese TV series of the 1960s was aired as Giant Robot during 1990–91 in weekly episodes.

== See also ==
- List of programs broadcast by DD National
- Akashvani
- Ministry of Information and Broadcasting
- DD Free Dish
- List of South Asian television channels by country
- Media in Chennai
