= Zee Keralam =

Malayalam language TV channel

- Logo used since 7 June 2025
- Type: Television Channel
- Country: India, Middle East, Thailand
- Broadcast area: Kerala, Middle East
- Headquarters: Kochi, Kerala, India

Programming
- Language: Malayalam
- Picture format: 1080i HDTV; Dolby 5.1 Surround Sound for HDTV (downscaled to letterboxed 576i for the SDTV feed)

Ownership
- Owner: Zee Entertainment Enterprises
- Sister channels: Zee Channels

History
- Launched: 26 November 2018; 7 years ago

Links
- Webcast: Zee Keralam on ZEE5

Zee Keralam also known as Z Keralam is an Indian Malayalam language general entertainment pay television channel owned by Zee Entertainment Enterprises. The channel was launched on 26 November 2018 and it is ZEE's fifth channel in the southern region. The channel is headquartered in Kochi, Kerala.

== History ==
Zee Keralam with its high definition (HD) variant, Zee Keralam HD was launched on 26 November 2018 and it is ZEE's fifth channel in the southern region. Zee Keralam was one of the top 5 channels according BARC rating within the first year of its launch.

== Current broadcast ==
=== Drama series ===
Premiere date	Series	Notes and Adaptation of
30 September 2024	Snehapoorvam Shyama	Sequel to Shyamambaram; Hindi TV series Chotti Bahu
25 November 2024	Akale	Telugu TV series Ammayi Garu
14 July 2025	Krishna Gadha	Telugu TV series Kalyana Vaibhogam
17 November 2025	Chembarathy	Telugu TV series Chamanthi
17 November 2025	Durga	Bengali TV series Jagaddhatri
6 July 2026	Pranayavilasam	Bengali TV series Parineeta
20 July 2026	Valyettan	Tamil TV series Anna
5 October 2026	Kanmashi	

== Former broadcast ==
=== Drama series ===
Premiere date	Series	Last aired	Adaptation of
26 November 2018	Adutha Bellodu Koodi	12 April 2019	
26 November 2018	Kuttikurumban	8 June 2019	
26 November 2018	Alliyambal	9 November 2019	Marathi TV series Tujhyat Jeev Rangala
26 November 2018	Swathi Nakshatram Chothi	15 March 2020	Hindi TV series Badho Bahu
26 November 2018	Chembarathi	25 March 2022	Telugu TV series Muddha Mandaram
11 March 2019	Kabani	27 March 2020	Telugu TV series Mutyala Muggu
1 July 2019	Sumangali Bhava	24 January 2021	Marathi TV series Tu Ashi Jawali Raha
1 July 2019	Pookkalam Varavayi	26 September 2021	Telugu TV series Varudhini Parinayam
18 November 2019	Sathya Enna Penkutty	17 April 2021	Odia TV series Sindura Bindu
10 February 2020	Neeyum Njanum	8 April 2023	Marathi TV series Tula Pahate Re
13 July 2020	Karthika Deepam	11 September 2022	
30 November 2020	Kaiyethum Doorath	10 June 2023	Telugu TV series Raktha Sambandham
28 December 2020	Manam Pole Mangalyam	2 January 2022	Marathi TV series Aggabai Sasubai
19 April 2021	Mrs. Hitler	11 June 2023	Hindi TV series Guddan Tumse Na Ho Payega
18 October 2021	Pranayavarnangal	23 December 2022	Bengali TV series Ki Kore Bolbo Tomay
25 October 2021	Amma Makal	9 September 2022	
17 January 2022	Erivum Puliyum	13 May 2022	
11 April 2022	Kudumbashree Sharada	16 October 2026	Telugu TV series Radhamma Kuthuru
27 June 2022	Bhagyalakshmi	12 March 2023	
12 September 2022	Wife Is Beautiful	29 December 2023	
2 January 2023	Mizhirandilum	11 August 2024	
6 February 2023	Shyamambaram	29 September 2024	Bengali TV series Krishnakoli
17 April 2023	Anuraga Ganam Pole	15 March 2024	Hindi TV series Bade Achhe Lagte Hain
12 June 2023	Parvathy	30 September 2024	Bengali TV series Trinayani
12 June 2023	Sudhamani Supera	17 December 2023	Hindi TV series Pushpa Impossible
3 September 2023	Mangalyam	25 September 2026	
18 December 2023	Subhadram	16 June 2024	Telugu TV series Suryavamsham
18 December 2023	Mayamayooram	22 November 2024	Tamil TV series Yaaradi Nee Mohini
25 March 2024	Valsalyam	20 May 2025	Hindi TV series Tujhse Hai Raabta
17 June 2024	Madhura Nombara Kaatu	22 November 2025	Telugu TV series Na Kodalu Bhangaram
28 October 2024	Apoorvaragam	20 May 2025	Hindi TV series Banoo Main Teri Dulhann
12 August 2024	Manathe Kottaram	3 May 2026	Tamil TV series Thavamai Thavamirundhu

=== Reality shows ===
Premiere date	Show	Last aired
8 December 2018	Dance Kerala Dance season 1,2	24 September 2022
7 March 2019	Comedy Nights with Suraj	28 June 2019
6 April 2019	Sa Re Ga Ma Pa Keralam season 1–3	7 December 2025
14 March 2020	Funny Nights with Pearle Maaney	4 April 2021
4 October 2020	Mr and Mrs	21 March 2021
18 April 2021	Sa Re Ga Ma Pa Keralam Li'l Champs season 1,2	15 November 2026
8 October 2022	Njanum Entalum	8 January 2023
4 February 2023	Drama Juniors season 1,2	17 May 2026
31 December 2024	Super Show	30 March 2025
