= List of Malayalam films of 2004 =

The following is a list of Malayalam films released in the year 2004.

Title	Director	Screenplay	Cast
4 the People	Jayaraj	Iqbal Kuttippuram	Narain, Bharath, Arun, Gopika
Agninakshathram	Kareem	S. N. Swamy	Suresh Gopi, Biju Menon, Siddique, Indraja
Akale	Shyamaprasad	Shyamaprasad	Prithviraj Sukumaran, Geethu Mohandas, Sheela
Amrutham	Sibi Malayil	K. Gireesh Kumar	Jayaram, Arun, Padmapriya, Bhavana,
Aparichithan	Sanjiv Sivan	Sanjiv Sivan	Mammootty, Kavya Madhavan, Manya, Vineeth Kumar
Black	Ranjith	Ranjith	Mammootty, Lal, Rahman, Babu Antony
C. I. Mahadevan 5 Adi 4 Inchu	K. K. Haridas		Cochin Haneefa, Shruti, Jagathy Sreekumar
Chathikkatha Chanthu	Rafi Mecartin	Rafi Mecartin	Jayasurya, Vineeth, Navya Nair, Bhavana, Lal
Chithariyavar	Lalji	G. R. Indugopan	Sreenivasan, Mundoor Krishnankutty, Maya Mausumi
Ee Snehatheerathu	Sivaprasad	Sivaprasad	Kunchako Boban, Jaya Prada, Lal, Uma Shankari
Freedom	Thampi Kannanthanam		Jishnu Raghavan, Nishanth Sagar, Renuka Menon
Gaurisankaram	Nemom Pushparaj		Kavya Madhavan, Munna
Govindankutty Thirakkilanu	Vinodh Narayan		Riyaz, Jagathy Sreekumar, Kottayam Nazeer
Greetings	Shajoon Karyal	Mani Shornur	Jayasurya, Kavya Madhavan, Innocent
Kaazhcha	Blessy	Blessy	Mammootty, Padmapriya, Sanusha
Kathavasheshan	T. V. Chandran	T. V. Chandran	Dileep, Jyothirmayi, Nithya Das
Kakkakarumban	M. A. Venu		Sidharth Bharathan, Meenakshi, Nedumudi Venu
Kanninum Kannadikkum	Sundardas	Haridas Karivellur	Kalabhavan Mani, Prabhu, Monica, Siddique
Kerala House Udan Vilpanakku	Thaha	Kaloor Dennis	Jayasurya, Uma, Harisree Ashokan
Koottu	Jayaprakash		Richard, Aravind Akash, Lena
Kottaram Vaidyan	Satheesh Venganoor		Vineeth Kumar, Sujitha
Mampazhakkalam	Joshiy	T. A. Shahid	Mohanlal, Shobana
Manjupoloru Penkutti	Kamal	Kalavoor Ravikumar	Jayakrishnan, Amrita Prakash, Lalu Alex, Bhanupriya
Maratha Nadu	Haridas		Kalabhavan Mani, Murali, Nithya Das
Masanagudi Mannadiyar Speaking	J. Francis		Jagathy Sreekumar, Indrans
Mayilattam	V. M. Vinu	Mani Shornur	Jayaram, Rambha, Indraja, Jagathy Sreekumar
Natturajavu	Shaji Kailas	T. A. Shahid	Mohanlal, Kalabhavan Mani, Meena, Nayan Thara
Nerkku Nere	P. N. Menon		Nedumudi Venu, Kalpana
Njan Salperu Ramankutty	Anil Babu	Kalavoor Ravikumar	Jayaram, Gayatri Jayaraman, Jagathy Sreekumar
Panchajanyam	Prasad		Kalabhavan Mani
Parayam	Anil	Suresh Pothuval	Jishnu Raghavan, Bhavana, Madhu Warrier
Perumazhakkalam	Kamal	T. A. Razaq	Dileep, Meera Jasmine, Kavya Madhavan, Biju Menon
Pravaasam			Murali, Sona Nair
Priyam Priyamkaram	Devidas Chalanat	Devidas Chalanat	Saji Soman, Dhanya Menon
Quotation	Vinod Vijayan		Arun, Sujitha, Vinayakan, I. M. Vijayan
Rain Rain Come Again	Jayaraj		Ajay Thomas, Divya Lakshmi, Jassie Gift
Rasikan	Lal Jose	Murali Gopy	Dileep, Samvrutha Sunil, Biju Menon
Runway	Joshiy	Udayakrishna-Sibi K Thomas	Dileep, Indrajith Sukumaran, Murali, Kavya Madhavan, Harisree Ashokan
Sancharam	Lijy J. Pullappalli	Lijy J. Pullappalli	Suhasini V. Nair, Shruthi Menon
Sasneham Sumithra	Ambadi Krishnan	Ambadi Krishnan	Suresh Gopi, Siddique, Renjini Krishnan
Sathyam	Vinayan		Prithviraj Sukumaran, Priyamani, Taruni Sachdev, Thilakan
Sethurama Iyer CBI	K. Madhu	S. N. Swamy	Mammootty, Mukesh, Jagathy Sreekumar, Kalabhavan Mani
Symphony	I. V. Sasi	Mahesh Mithra	Shiva, Anu Sasi, Swathi Varma, Riyaz Khan
Thalamelam	Nissar		Kalabhavan Mani, Indraja, Jagathy Sreekumar,
Thekkekkara Superfast	Thaha		Mukesh, Dileep, Jagathy Sreekumar
Thudakkam	I. Sasi	I. Sasi	Shivaj, Geethu Mohandas
Udayam	Vinu Jeomon		Anil, Sai Kumar, Nandhini
Vajram	Pramod Pappan	Dennis Joseph	Mammootty, Nandhini, Vasundhara Das
Vamanapuram Bus Route	Sonu Sisupal	John	Mohanlal, Lakshmi Gopalaswamy
Velli Nakshathram	Vinayan	Vinayan	Prithviraj Sukumaran, Taruni Sachdev, Meenakshi
Vesham	V. M. Vinu	T. A. Razaq	Mammootty, Indrajith Sukumaran, Innocent, Mohini, Gopika
Vettam	Priyadarsan	Udayakrishna-Sibi K Thomas	Dileep, Bhavna Pani, Kalabhavan Mani, Jagathy Sreekumar
Vismayathumbathu	Fazil	Fazil	Mohanlal, Nayantara, Mukesh
Wanted	Murali Nagavally	Priyadarshan	Madhu Warrier, Aravind, Nishanth Sagar, Suchitra
Youth Festival	Jose Thomas	Ashok V. C.	Siddharth, Bhavana, Meenakshi, Aby Kunjumon
Chayam			
Jalolsavam			
Kusruthi			
Marmajaalam			
Marmam			
Nirappakittu			
Oru Pankaali Maathram			
Parinamam			
Sandra			
Soumyam			
Students			
Swapnaanubhavam			
Swarna Medal			
Yaanam			

== Dubbed films ==
Title	Director(s)	Original film		Cast	Ref.
Title	Director(s)	Film	Language	Cast	Ref.
Monalisa	Indrajith Lankesh	Monalisa	Kannada	Sameer Dattani, Sadha	
Chekavan	Kodi Ramakrishna	Anji	Telugu	Chiranjeevi	
Pranayamay	Trivikram Srinivas	Nuvve Nuvve	Telugu	Tarun, Shriya Saran	
