= List of Malayalam films of 2003 =

The following is a list of Malayalam films released in the year 2003.

| Title | Director | Screenplay | Cast |
|---|---|---|---|
| Achante Kochumol | Rajan P. Dev | Muthukulam Somanath | Rajan P. Dev, Madhupal, Indraja |
| Ammakilikkoodu | M. Padmakumar | Ranjith | Prithviraj, Navya Nair |
| Ananthapuram Raajakumaari | | | |
| Anyar | Lenin Rajendran | Lenin Rajendran | Biju Menon, Jyothirmayi, Lal |
| Arimpara | Murali Nair | Murali Nair, Madhu Apsara | Nedumudi Venu |
| Balettan | V. M. Vinu | T. A. Shahid | Mohanlal, Devayani |
| Chakram | Lohithadas | Lohithadas | Prithviraj, Meera Jasmine |
| Chayam | Biju C. Kannan | Sivaprasad Eravoor | Manoj K. Jayan |
| Cheri | K. S. Sivachandran | Latheesh Kumar | Nazar, Jagathy Sreekumar, Indraja |
| Chithrakoodam | Pradeep Kumar | Pradeep Kumar | Abhinay, Jagadish, Innocent |
| Choonda | Venugopan | Kalavoor Ravikumar | Jishnu Raghavan, Geethu Mohandas, Siddique |
| Chronic Bachelor | Siddiq | Siddiq | Mammootty, Rambha, Mukesh, Bhavana |
| CID Moosa | Johny Antony | Udayakrishna-Sibi K. Thomas | Dileep, Bhavana |
| Ente Veedu Appoontem | Sibi Malayil | Bobby - Sanjay | Jayaram, Jyothirmayi, Kaalidas |
| The Fire | Sanker Krishna | Vinu Narayanan | Shankar, Jagadish, Sajitha Betti |
| Gowrisankaram | Nemam Pushparaj | Madampu Kunjukuttan | Munna, Kavya Madhavan |
| Gramaphone | Kamal | Iqbal Kuttippuram | Dileep, Meera Jasmine, Navya Nair |
| Guda | | | |
| Happy Home | | | |
| Hariharan Pillai Happy Aanu | Viswan Vaduthala | P. S. Kumar | Mohanlal, Jyothirmayi |
| Ivar | T. K. Rajeev Kumar | T. K. Rajeev Kumar | Jayaram, Biju Menon, Bhavana |
| Janakeeyam | Rajaganeshan | Rajaganeshan | Sai Kumar |
| Japam | | | |
| Kalavarkey | Rajesh Narayanan | B. S. Mini | Jagathy Sreekumar |
| Kaliyodam | Nazer Azeez | Batton Bose | Siddique, Vijayakumar |
| Kasthooriman | Lohithadas | Lohithadas | Kunchacko Boban, Meera Jasmine |
| Kilichundan Mampazham | Priyadarsan | Priyadarsan | Mohanlal, Soundarya, Sreenivasan |
| The King Maker Leader | Deepan | | Vijayakumar, Aishwarya |
| Kusruthi | Anil Babu | Rajan Kiriyath | Harisree Asokan, Kalabhavan Mani |
| Madhuram | | | |
| Malsaram | Anil C. Menon | T. A. Shahid | Kalabhavan Mani, Sujitha, Karthika |
| Manassinakkare | Sathyan Anthikkad | Ranjan Pramod | Jayaram, Sheela, Nayanthara |
| Margam | Rajeev Vijayaraghavan | | Nedumudi Venu, Madhupal |
| Mazha Peyyumpol | | | |
| Mazhanoolkkanavu | | | Vineeth Kumar, Charulatha |
| Meerayude Dukhavum Muthuvinte Swapnavum | Vinayan | Vinayan | Prithviraj, Ambili Devi, Renuka Menon |
| Melvilasam Sariyanu | Pradeep | Sathrughnan | Vineeth Kumar, Sujitha |
| Mizhi Randilum | Ranjith | Ranjith | Kavya Madhavan, Dileep, Indrajith Sukumaran |
| Mr. Brahmachari | Thulasidas | J. Pallassery | Mohanlal, Meena |
| Mullavalliyum Thenmavum | V. K. Prakash | N. B. Vindhyan | Kunchacko Boban, Chaya Singh, Indrajith |
| Ottakkambi Naadam | | | |
| Paadam Onnu: Oru Vilapam | T. V. Chandran | T. V. Chandran | Meera Jasmine |
| Parinamam | Venu | Madampu Kunjukuttan | Madampu Kunjukuttan, Nedumudi Venu |
| Pattalam | Lal Jose | Reji Nair | Mammootty, Biju Menon, Jyothirmayi, Tessa |
| Pattanathil Sundaran | | | |
| Please Wait | | | |
| Pulival Kalyanam | Shafi | Udayakrishna-Sibi K. Thomas | Jayasurya, Kavya Madhavan, Lal, Salim Kumar |
| Punarjani | Major Ravi | | Master Pranav |
| Sadanandante Samayam | Akbar Jose | J. Pallassery | Dileep, Kavya Madhavan |
| Sahodharan Sahadevan | Sunil | Ambadi Haneefa | Mukesh, Jagadish, Geethu Mohandas |
| Saphalam | Ashok R. Nath | Madamb Kunjukuttan | Balachandra Menon, Sumithra |
| Saudhamini | P. Gopikumar | V. P. Bhanumathy | Jaya Krishnan, Jagadish |
| Shingari Bolona | Sathish Mannarkad | Anil Raj | Nishanth Sagar, Lal, Manya |
| Sthithi | R. Sarath | | Unni Menon, Nandini Ghosal |
| Sundarikkutty | | | |
| Swantham Malavika | Jagadish Chandran | Alapuzha Sharif | Gopi Menon, Manya |
| Swapnakoodu | Kamal | Kamal, Iqbal Kuttippuram | Prithviraj, Kunchacko Boban, Jayasurya, Meera Jasmine, Bhavana |
| Swapnam Kondu Thulabharam | Rajasenan | Raghunath Paleri | Suresh Gopi, Kunchako Boban, Nandana |
| Thazhampoo | | | |
| Thilakkam | Jayaraj | Rafi Mecartin | Dileep, Kavya Madhavan, Nedumudi Venu |
| Thillana Thillana | Saji T. S. | Vinu Kiriyath | Krishna, Kaveri, Jomol |
| Utthara | Sanil Kalathil | Sanil Kalathil, N. S. Bijulal | Lal, Vijayaraghavan |
| Valathottu Thirinjal Nalamathe Veedu | Ansar Kalabhavan | Kalabhavan Ansar | Jishnu Raghavan, Bhavana |
| Varna Swapnangal | | | |
| Varsha | | | |
| Varum Varunnu Vannu | K. R. Ramadas | Balachandra Menon | Balachandra Menon, G. S. Pradeep, Gouthami |
| Vasanthamalika | Suresh Krishna | | Mukesh, Uma Shankari |
| Vellithira | Bhadran | Bhadran | Prithviraj, Navya Nair |
| Vigathakumaran | | | |
| Vivaadam | | | |
| War and Love | Vinayan | | Dileep, Prabhu, Laila, Indraja |
| Zameendaar | | | |

== Dubbed films ==
| Title | Director(s) | Original film | | Cast | Ref. |
| Title | Director(s) | Film | Language | Cast | Ref. |
|---|---|---|---|---|---|
| Magic Magic 3D | | Magic Magic 3D | Tamil | | |
