= T. A. Razzaq =

Indian screenwriter (1958–2016)

- Born: 25 April 1958; Thurakkal, Kondotty
- Died: 15 August 2016 (aged 58); Kochi, Kerala, India
- Occupations: Screenwriter, Director & Social Worker
- Years active: 1991–2016
- Spouse: Shahida Razak
- Children: Sunila Razak, Anush Razak
- Parent(s): T. A. Bappu; Vazhayil Khadeeja
- Relatives: T. A. Shahid (brother)

T. A. Razzaq (25 April 1958 – 15 August 2016) was an Indian screenwriter, who worked in the Malayalam film industry. He was born to T.A. Bappu and Vazhayil Khadeeja. His younger brother, T. A. Shahid, was also a screenwriter who wrote scripts for successful films such as Balettan and Rajamanikyam. He has received Kerala State Film Award for Best Story in 1996 and 2002 and for Kerala State Film Award for Best Screenplay in 1996.

He started his film career as assistant director of A .T. Abu with Dhwani and Lenin Rajendran for Vachanam. Later he turned to pen on advice of actor Thilakan who gave him debut to make screenplay based on Thilakan's own directed drama Fasaq screened as "Ghoshayathra" the same as another movie Vishnulokam in 1991. He worked for around 30 Malayalam movies, contributing script, story, and dialogue. He made films with prominent film directors in Malayalam like Kamal, Sibi Malayil, Jayaraj and V.M. Vinu. In 2014, he debuted in direction through the film 'Moonnam Naal Njayarazhcha, which remains the only film he directed. His last film as a scriptwriter was 'Sukhamayirikkatte', released in 2016. He died at Amrita Hospital in Kochi on 15 August 2016, aged 58. He was undergoing a long battle with liver cirrhosis. He was buried with full state honors at his hometown Kondotty.

Perumazhakkalam, the film he scripted, was screened at 21st IFFK as a homage. He appeared in Ranjith's directed Malayalam film Paleri Manikyam: Oru Pathirakolapathakathinte Katha.

== Awards ==
- 1996 Kerala State Film Award for Best Screenplay for Kaanaakkinaavu
- 1996 Kerala State Film Award for Best Story for Kaanaakkinaavu
- 2002 Kerala State Film Award for Best Story for Aayirathil Oruvan
- 2002 Asianet Film Awards for Best Script Writer for Uthaman
- 2004 Kerala State Film Award for Best Story for Perumazhakkalam
- 2004 Asianet Film Awards for Best Script Writer for Perumazhakkalam

== Filmography ==
| Year | Film | Story | Screenplay | Dialogue | Direction |
|---|---|---|---|---|---|
| 1991 | Vishnulokam | ✓ | ✓ | ✓ | Kamal |
| 1991 | Anaswaram | ✓ | ✓ | ✓ | Jomon |
| 1992 | Nadody | ✓ | ✓ | ✓ | Thampi Kannanthanam |
| 1993 | Ghoshayathra | ✓ | ✓ | ✓ | G. S. Vijayan |
| 1993 | Bhoomi Geetham | ✓ | ✓ | ✓ | Kamal |
| 1993 | Ente Sreekkuttikku | ✓ | ✓ | ✓ | Jose Thomas |
| 1993 | Ghazal | ✓ | ✓ | ✓ | Kamal |
| 1995 | Karma | ✓ | ✓ | ✓ | Jomon |
| 1996 | Kanakkinaavu | ✓ | ✓ | ✓ | Sibi Malayil |
| 1996 | The Prince | - | - | ✓ | Suresh Krishna |
| 1998 | Sneham | ✓ | ✓ | ✓ | Jayaraj |
| 1998 | Thalolam | ✓ | ✓ | ✓ | Jayaraj |
| 1999 | Saphalyam | ✓ | ✓ | ✓ | G. S. Vijayan |
| 2001 | Uthaman | ✓ | ✓ | ✓ | Anil Kumar |
| 2002 | Valkannadi | ✓ | ✓ | ✓ | Anil Kumar |
| 2003 | Balettan | ✓ | ✓ | ✓ | V. M. Vinu |
| 2004 | Perumazhakkalam | ✓ | ✓ | ✓ | Kamal |
| 2004 | Vesham | ✓ | ✓ | ✓ | V. M. Vinu |
| 2004 | Maratha Naadu | ✓ | ✓ | ✓ | K. K. Haridas |
| 2005 | Bus Conductor | ✓ | ✓ | ✓ | V. M. Vinu |
| 2005 | Rappakal | ✓ | ✓ | ✓ | Kamal |
| 2005 | Anchil Oral Arjunan | ✓ | ✓ | ✓ | P. Anil |
| 2007 | Aakasham | ✓ | ✓ | ✓ | Sundar Das |
| 2008 | Parunthu | ✓ | ✓ | ✓ | M.Padmakumar |
| 2008 | Mayabazar | - | ✓ | ✓ | Thomas Sebastian |
| 2009 | Aayirathil Oruvan | ✓ | ✓ | ✓ | Sibi Malayil |
| 2011 | Azhakkadal | ✓ | - | ✓ | Shaan |
| 2015 | Saigal Padukayanu | ✓ | ✓ | ✓ | Sibi Malayil |
| 2016 | Venalodungathe (Unreleased) | ✓ | ✓ | ✓ | Sanjeev Sivan |
| 2016 | Sughamayirikkatte | ✓ | ✓ | ✓ | Reji Prabhakaran |
| 2016 | Moonnam Naal Njayarazhcha | ✓ | ✓ | ✓ | Himself |

== Lyrics ==
- Maanathu Chandiranundo - Aakasham (2007)
