= Ben Johnson (film) =

2005 Indian film by Anil C. Menon

- Directed by: Anil C. Menon
- Written by: T. A. Shahid
- Produced by: Milan Jaleel
- Starring: Kalabhavan Mani; Indraja; Siddique; Vijayaraghavan; Harisree Ashokan
- Cinematography: P. Sukumar
- Edited by: L. Bhoominathan
- Music by: Deepak Dev (songs); C. Rajamani (score)
- Production company: Galaxy Films
- Distributed by: Galaxy Films
- Release date: 24 June 2005
- Country: India
- Language: Malayalam

Ben Johnson is a 2005 Indian Malayalam-language action thriller film directed by Anil C. Menon, written by T. A. Shahid, and produced by Milan Jaleel. It stars Kalabhavan Mani in a dual role being the title character and his father, alongside Indraja, Siddique, Vijayaraghavan, Harisree Ashokan, Madhu and Adithya Menon in supporting roles. The songs were composed by Deepak Dev.

Ben Johnson was released on 24 June 2005 and was a commercial success at the box office. The film was dubbed in Odia under the same title.

== Plot ==
Amarakkadan Pathrose is a local goon in the Muthangakuzhi village. He is the monarch of all that he surveys, thanks to his rough and ready methods. Fear stalks the village whenever he gets into ‘action’. His son, Johnson is everything that the fear-inspiring father is not. He goes out of his way to be nice to one and all, in an effort to erase the bad reputation set by his father. Johnson has always cherished the dream of becoming a policeman. Ever since his childhood, Johnson has been good in sports. Thanks to his excellence in athletics, the villagers start calling him Ben Johnson because of his physical resemblance to the famous Canadian sprinter.

Johnson manages to become a sub-inspector (SI) in Kerala police, under the sports quota! As destiny would have it, Johnson is posted as the SI in his own village of Muthangakuzhi. Now he is driven by a missionary zeal to rid the village of rowdies and baddies, both social as well as political.

== Cast ==
- Kalabhavan Mani in a double role as:
  - SI A. P. "Ben" Johnson (son)
  - Amarakkadan Pathrose (father)
- Indraja as Gouri
- Siddique as SP Stephen Varghese IPS
- Harisree Ashokan as Head Constable Swami
- Vijayaraghavan as Chandranthodi Viswanathan Menon MLA, the main antagonist
- Madhu as Govindan Menon, Lakshmiyamma's elder brother and Johnson's uncle
- Kalasala Babu as Chandranthodi Madhava Menon
- Cochin Haneefa as ASI Eenashu Pillai
- Sukumari as Dhakshyani, Gouri's grandmother
- Ambika as Lakshmiyamma (Lakshmikutty), Johnson's mother
- Adithya Menon as Vettukadan Velayudhan, the secondary antagonist
- Sadiq as Chandranthodi Surendran Menon
- Machan Varghese as Constable Indran
- Vishnu Prasad as Chandranthodi Hariprasad Menon
- Shruti
- Bheeman Raghu as Raghu
- I. M. Vijayan
- T. P. Madhavan as Minister
- Narayanankutty
- Abu Salim as Abu
- Chali Pala as Retd. DYSP Parameshwaran
- Baiju Ezhupunna as Thrivikraman
- Indrajith Sukumaran as Police officer (Photo archive)
- Innocent as

Chief Minister Raman Pilla (guest)

- Nadirshah as Himself (cameo)

== Music ==
The music was composed by Deepak Dev, with lyrics written by Kaithapram.

No.	Song	Singers	Lyrics	Length (m:ss)
1	"Sona Sona nee"	Kalabhavan Mani, Malgudi Subha	Kaithapram	
2	"Iniyum Mizhikal"	Sujatha Mohan	Kaithapram	
3	"Iniyum Mizhikal" (M)	K. J. Yesudas	Kaithapram	
4	"Munpe Munpe"	Deepak Dev, Arjun Sasi	Kaithapram, Arjun Sasi	
5	"Munpe Munpe"	Arjun Sasi	Kaithapram, Arjun Sasi	
6	"Pettayaadi"	Nadirsha, Sangeetha	Nadirsha	

== Reception ==
It was released on 24 June 2005. The film was a commercial success at the box office. The songs were well received, especially the song "Sona..Sona.." sung by Kalabhavan Mani and "Iniyum Mizhikal Nirayaruthe" by K.J. Yesudas.
