= Bus Conductor (film) =

- Directed by: V. M. Vinu
- Written by: T. A. Razzaq
- Produced by: P. Rajan
- Starring: Mammootty; Jayasurya; Adithya Menon; Bhavana; Mamta Mohandas
- Cinematography: Sanjeev Shankar
- Music by: M Jayachandran
- Release date: 23 December 2005
- Running time: 150 minutes
- Country: India
- Language: Malayalam

Bus Conductor is a 2005 Indian Malayalam-language drama film directed by V. M. Vinu. The film stars Mammootty in the lead role as Kunjakka, along with Adithya Menon, Jayasurya, Bhavana, Nikita Thukral, Mamta Mohandas, Innocent, Harisree Ashokan, and Kalpana in supporting roles. The story revolves around Kunjakka, a bus conductor, and the problems he and his family face. The film was released on 23 December 2005 during Christmas week. It received mixed reviews from critics.

== Plot ==
Set in the Malabar region of Kerala, the film follows S. V. Zakir Hussain, popularly known as Kunjakka, a bus conductor who serves as the head of his extended family. His household includes his mother, his married sister, her husband and son, his younger sisters, including Selina, and several other relatives. Outside the family, Kunjakka's life is closely connected to his colleagues in the private bus service and the local police, including the influential Sub-Inspector Sajan George, who also operates a private bus company.

Despite his good intentions, Kunjakka is burdened with numerous personal and family responsibilities. He frequently comes into conflict with Sajan, whose business interests create tensions between them. At the same time, Kunjakka must deal with a family crisis after his relative Najeeb impregnates a local woman before leaving for Dubai, leaving her without support. Kunjakka assumes responsibility for her welfare while also attempting to resolve growing misunderstandings within his family. Throughout these difficulties, he finds emotional support in Noorjahan.

The film follows Kunjakka's efforts to reconcile conflicts within his family and overcome the personal and social challenges he faces.

== Cast ==
- Mammootty as Sultan Veetil Zakir Hussain aka Kunjakka
- Jayasurya as Najeeb
- Adithya Menon as Sub Inspector Sajan George
- Innocent as Majeed, Kunjakka's uncle
- Harisree Ashokan as Gangadharan, Kunjakka's close friend
- Devan as Kunjakka's father, Mohammed Ismail
- Bhavana as Sugandhi (Najeeb's lover)
- Mamta Mohandas as Selina
- Nikita Thukral as Noorjahan
- Babu Namboothiri
- Santhosh as Sukumaran
- Bindu Panicker as Kunjakka's mother
- Poornima Parameswaran as Kunjakka's sister
- Arun Krishnan as Junior Kunjakka
- Ramu as Fasaludheen
- Abu Salim as Azeez
- Suraj Venjaramoodu as Hamsa, bus conductor
- Kalpana as Ambili
- Majeed as Shamsudheen(Selina's fiancée's father)
- Ambika Mohan as Shamsudheen's wife(Selina's fiancée's mother)
- Mohan Jose as Thomas Chacko
- Sreedevi Unni as Sugandhi's mother
- Geetha Nair
- Deepika Mohan as a doctor
- Jisna Ali as Najeeb's sister
- Nivia Rebin as Rajeswari
- Bindu Murali
- Thrissur Elsy
- Vijayan Karanthoor

== Soundtrack ==
The film features original songs composed by M. Jayachandran.

- "Etho Rathri (Male)" - K. J. Yesudas
- "Manathe" - Rimi Tomy, Madhu Balakrishnan
- "Kondotty" - Rimi Tomy, Vidhu Prathap, Madhu Balakrishnan
- "Etho Rathri (Female)" - K. S. Chithra
- "Vaathaapi" - Binni Krishnakumar

== Reception ==
=== Critical reception ===
Sify gives the film an 'Average' verdict and writes: " Initially Bus Conductor is quite an enjoyable ride with Harishree Asokan, Kalpana and others. Mammootty keeps you entertained with his wise cracks and mirrors the pitiable condition of workers of private buses in Kerala. But the film starts hitting potholes as soon as the script writer and director introduces fake emotions laced with sentiments. As the film winds down to its finale there is a sense of deja vu. More importantly in this day and age, it is a bit regressive and misleading for the director to think that the hero can be the protector of a woman without any strings attached. Vinu, where is the twist in the tale? M. Jayachandran is losing his magic touch as there is not even one song which is hummable. The background score is similar to Tamil superstar films, where they scream the title of the movie as the hero delivers a blow to the villain or utters a punch line. Perhaps the high point of the film is the artwork of Bobban who has realistically created a bus stand that you see in towns of Kerala. Bus Conductor is a rough ride strictly for the die-hard fans of Mammookka!"

=== Box office ===
The film was an average grosser.
