= Abu Salim (actor) =

Indian actor

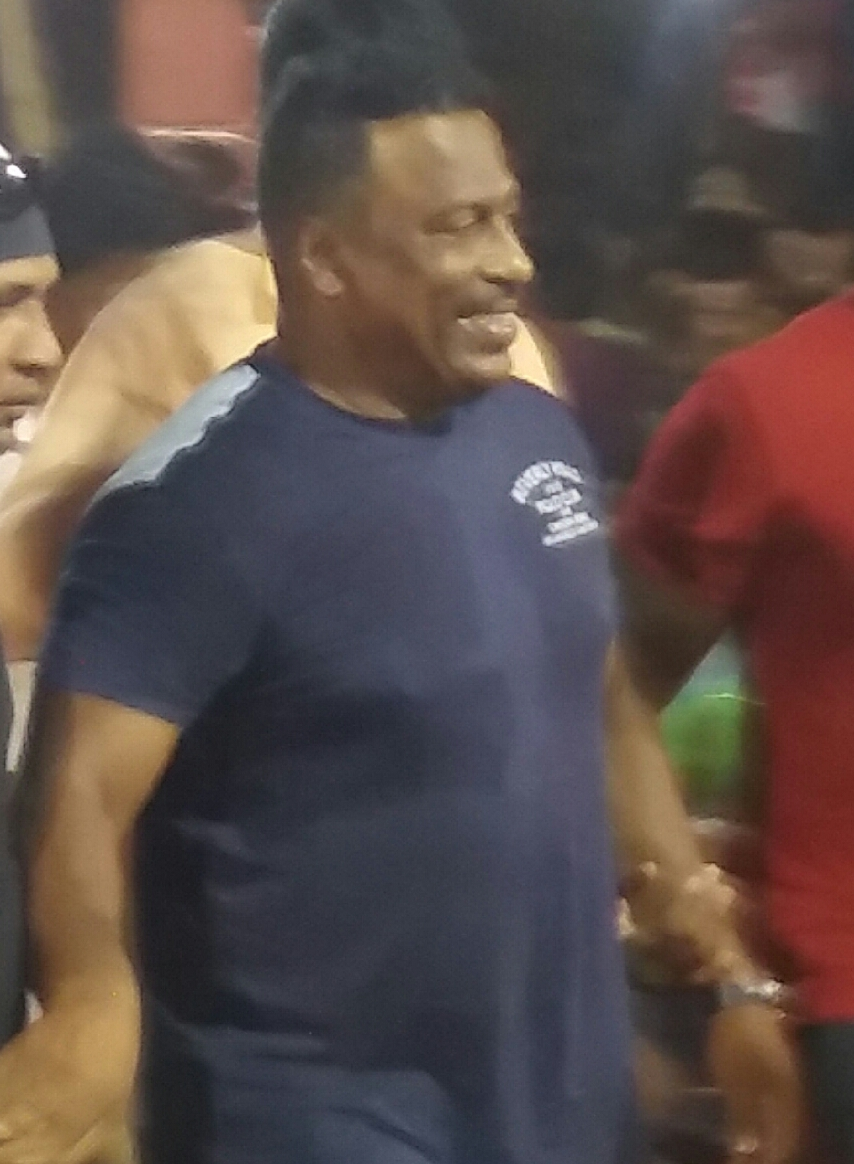
- Salim at an event in 2017
- Born: 11 May 1956 (age 70); Malabar district, Madras State (present day Wayanad, Kerala), India
- Occupations: Actor; bodybuilder; police officer
- Years active: 1976–present
- Spouse: Ummukulsu (m. 1982)
- Children: 2

Abu Salim (born 11 May 1956) is an Indian film actor, bodybuilder, and retired police officer, who works predominantly in the Malayalam cinema. He has also acted in a few Tamil, Telugu and Hindi films. He has mostly played negative roles.

== Early life ==
Abu Salim was born as the second son among six children to Kunhammed and Fathima at Kalpetta in Wayanad district. He had his primary education from S. K. M. J. High School, Kalpetta.

Salim developed an interest in bodybuilding after being inspired by the work of actor and bodybuilder Arnold Schwarzenegger, whom he considers his role model. He has won several bodybuilding titles, including Mr. Calicut in 1981, Mr. Kerala in 1982, Mr. South India three times (in 1983, 1986, and 1987), and Mr. India twice (in 1984 and 1992). He served as a sub-inspector in the Kerala Police and retired in 2012. Salim has trained in some kalaripayattu and holds a black belt in shotokan-style karate.

== Career ==
Salim made his film debut in 1978 with Rajan Paranja Kadha. He played a significant role in the Ranjith-directed Prajapathi. In the 2015 crime film Loham, he portrayed a character inspired by the looks of Dwayne Johnson, which was a departure from his usual roles, as it was a positive character. In the same year, he played Stalin Mammali, the father of Jayasurya's character, in the comedy film Amar Akbar Anthony, performing a humorous character.

== Personal life ==
He married Ummukulsu on 23 May 1982. The couple has a daughter, Sabitha and a son, Sanu Salim. His daughter lives in Wollongong, Australia with her husband and children. His son runs a restaurant in Kalpetta, a media studio in Kozhikode and a packet food manufacturing company in Kochi.

== Filmography ==
=== Malayalam ===
Year	Title	Role	Notes
1978	Rajan Paranja Kadha		
1988	Puravrutham		
1990	Brahma Rakshass	Gunda	
1991	Kalari	Police officer	
1992	Aayushkalam	Peter	
1992	Johnnie Walker		
1993	Yadhavam		
1994	Rudraksham		
1994	Cabinet	Goonda	
1994	Vishnu		
1994	Saadaram		
1994	Pingami	Muthu	
1995	Street	Goonda	
1995	Boxer	Hebro Daniel	
1996	Rajaputhran	Karunan	
1996	Yuvathurki	Jackson	
1996	Patanayakan	Phayalwan	
1996	Indraprastham	Goonda	
1997	The Car	Ambrose	
1997	Guru Sishyan	Vasu	
1997	Kudamattam		
1998	Sooryavanam	Akram	
1999	Pallavur Devanarayanan		
1999	Stalin Sivadas	Keshu	
1999	Captain	Keshavankutty	
1999	Panchapandavar		
1999	Pattabhishekam		
1999	Red Indians	Pokken	
2000	Rapid Action Force	Goonda	
2000	Nadan Pennum Natupramaniyum	Selvam	
2000	The Gang	Life Guard	
2000	Darling Darling		
2001	Ee Nadu Innale Vare		
2001	Sraavu		
2001	Unnathangalil	Prabhu	
2003	Mizhi Randilum	Srada's husband	
2003	C.I.D. Moosa	CI George	
2004	Vesham		
2004	Wanted		
2004	Vismayathumbathu	Inspector Ravi	
2005	Thommanum Makkalum	Manikyan	
2005	Chandrolsavam	Kelu	
2005	Bus Conductor		
2005	Police	Prisoner	
2005	Pauran		
2005	Ben Johnson	Abu	
2005	Rajamanikyam	Goonda	
2006	9 KK Road	Varkey	
2006	Prajapathi	Krishnankutty	
2006	Yes Your Honour	CI Philp Mathew	
2007	Nanma	Ayappan	
2007	Kaiyoppu	Circle Inspector	
2007	Inspector Garud	Karinchantha Vasu	
2007	Panthaya Kozhi	Manikyam	
2007	Black Cat	Kishore	
2007	Hallo	Hameed	
2007	Mission 90 Days	DSP Sivaji	
2008	Roudram	CI Hamsa	
2008	Chempada		
2008	Parunthu	Prabhakaran	
2009	Pramukhan		
2009	Chattambinadu		
2009	Ee Pattanathil Bhootham		
2009	Loudspeaker	Goonda	
2010	Brahmasthram	Ramachandran	
2010	Penpattanam		
2010	Valiyangadi	Police Officer Prathapan	
2010	Shikkar	DYSP Karunakaran	
2010	Thanthonni	Goonda	
2010	Ringtone	Gopi	
2010	College Days	SI Vaasu	
2010	Annarakkannanum Thannalayathu	Eshwara Varma	
2010	Drona 2010		
2011	Manushyamrugam	Prisoner	
2011	Collector	CI Xavior	
2011	Ulakam Chuttum Valiban	SP Krishnakumar	
2011	Venicile Vyapari	Abdhu	
2012	MLA Mani: Patham Classum Gusthiyum	Govindan	
2012	Mayamohini	Paili	
2012	My Boss	Vasu	
2013	Kutteem Kolum	Shanavas	
2013	Proprietors: Kammath & Kammath		
2013	Blackberry		
2013	Housefull		
2013	Nadodimannan	Kannappan	
2013	Immanuel	Chandy	
2013	D Company	Kartha	
2013	Ladies and Gentleman	Vinod	
2013	Daivathinte Swantham Cleetus	Udumbu Salim	
2014	Rajadhi Raja	Sandeep	
2015	Bhaskar The Rascal	Suresh	
2015	Ivan Maryadaraman	Rudran	
2015	Loham	Ali Imran	
2015	Amar Akbar Anthony	Stalin Mammali	
2016	Kasaba	Pazhani	
2016	Welcome to Central Jail	Prisoner Gopalan	
2017	Pretham Und Sookshikkuka		
2017	Oru Cinemakkaran	Ganeshan	
2018	Lolans		
2018	Uncle		
2018	Johny Johny Yes Appa	Stephen	
2019	Pattabhiraman	Johnson	
2019	Mask	Subair	
2019	Edakkad Battalion 06		
2020	Power Star		
2021	One	Jayakrishnan	
2021	Vidhi		
2022	Karnan Napoleon Bhagath Singh		
2022	Bheeshma Parvam	Shivankutty	
2022	Kenkemam	Police officer	
2022	Kaduva	Benjamin	
2022	Gold	Timber Brother	
2023	Pookkaalam	Venu	
2023	Pulimada	Kambikkuttan	
2024	Qalb		
2024	Gangs of Sukumara Kurup	Sukumara Kurup	
2024	Oru Anweshanathinte Thudakkam		
2025	Painkili	Sujithkumar	
2025	Nellikkampoyil Night Riders	Ex Soldier Vassappan	
2026	Bhishmar		
2026	Derby		

=== Tamil ===
- Ratchagan (1997)
- Majaa (2005)
- Kara (2026)
- Magudam (2026)

=== Telugu ===
- Devi (1999)
- Devi Putrudu (2001)

=== Hindi ===
- Kamaal Dhamaal Malamaal (2012)
