= Sketch (2007 film) =

- Directed by: Prasad Yadav
- Produced by: Dinesh Harsha
- Starring: Saiju Kurup; Sindhu Menon
- Release date: 12 January 2007
- Country: India
- Language: Malayalam

Sketch is a 2007 Indian Malayalam-language action thriller film directed by Prasad Yadav and starring Saiju Kurup in the lead role. It was released in 2007.

== Cast ==
- Saiju Kurup as Shivahari Iyer (Voice dubbed by Shobi Thilakan)
- Sindhu Menon as Lakshmi
- Jagathy Sreekumar as Advocate Partha Saradhi Iyer
- Suraj Venjaramoodu as Bhaskaran
- Karate Raja as Narendra Shetty
- Rajan P. Dev as Chandrasekhara Shetty
- T. G. Ravi as Koyakka
- Vijayaraghavan as Alexander Nambadan
- Vijayakumar as ACP Vishwanathan IPS
- T. S. Raju
- Sreejith Ravi as Basheer
- Shobha Mohan as Janaki Iyer
- Thodupuzha Vasanthi
- Santhakumari
- Sreenath
