= Black Cat (2007 film) =

- Directed by: Vinayan
- Written by: Vinayan
- Starring: Suresh Gopi
- Cinematography: Venugopalan
- Edited by: G. Murali
- Music by: Songs: M. Jayachandran Alphonse Joseph; Background Score: M. Jayachandran
- Release date: 18 October 2007
- Running time: 141 minutes
- Country: India
- Language: Malayalam

Black Cat is a 2007 Indian Malayalam-language action thriller film written and directed by Vinayan and starring Suresh Gopi in the title role along with an ensemble supporting cast.

== Plot ==
The story is about Black, a fisherman who is loved by all in his village even though he is a mentally ill person. He is also the security of Tharakan Muthalali, a famous marine food exporter and is cared for by his daughter Blessy, who values Black's friendship. Caesar and George Washington are his two supportive friends who were also Tharakan's securities. Varkeychan, Tharakan's brother, is not at all happy with Black's eating styles and rebuked him once for eating in his house. Black continues his childish behaviour and is called by Caesar to accompany Pathrose Moopen to have more food. Later, Tharakan receives a call from Mumbai Home Minister Prabhul Kumar regarding the arrival of his daughter Meenakshi to Tharakan's village.

When Meenakshi is happily shooting the video of festivals as a tribute to her, she gets shocked upon seeing Black, a person who looks exactly like City Police Commissioner Ramesh Sharma, her lover who she presumes to have died in an accident. Still suspicious, she decides to find more about Black and finally confirms that Black is Ramesh. After staying for a few days in Tharakan's house, Meenakshi moves to the house of Moosath, a powerful sorcerer and decides to bring Black back as Ramesh. Black is first impressed by Meenakshi, thanks to the cologne she wears. Tharakan drops Black at Moosath's house for a Pooja without any knowledge of Meenakshi's plans. Black resists initially, but patiently prepares for the Pooja and within days changes to a different personality. Meenakshi, who is eagerly waiting to see her Ramesh, gets an unexpected result from Moosath that the person is not Ramesh but Black although Meenakshi firmly believes that he is Ramesh. It comes true when he reminisces his fight between Prabhul, ADGP Aggarwal and Prabhul's elder brother Prakash. When he reaches Tharakan's house, everyone is surprised by his changed behaviour and Tharakan decides to find the truth behind Black's change in his behavior. Confused by the languages used by villagers, he sees a video shown by Blessy and gets an idea of it. When Pathrose brings him food, he refuses which surprises Pathrose.

Black moves to Mumbai as Ramesh after a gap of ten years to find his enemies and kill them. To get more information about his family, Ramesh consults his friend Advocate Dinesh from whom he learns that his mother and one sister are dead. His other sister, Shyama is taken care of by Dinesh and his wife. On his way, he reminisces about an incident where he fights Prabhul and team to save his sisters but gets beaten up by them and loses his sanity. After killing Prakash and Aggarwal, he returns to Tharakan's village in Kerala and gets arrested by DYSP Vikram Dharma who was sent by Prabhul from Mumbai. The next day he is taken to court, and Ramesh brilliantly acts as Black in front of the Judge and the prosecutor. The prosecutor argues that the person is Ramesh Sharma and not Black. Dinesh then brilliantly acts with the evidence regarding the death of Ramesh Sharma and further establishes that he is Black. When the prosecutor does not give up, the judge postpones the verdict.

The next day, Moosath and Meenakshi also come to the court and informs them that the accused is Black and not Ramesh. Dinesh once again proves that the person standing in the court is Black and hence gets Black exonerated. Ramesh then informs Dinesh about his plan to kill Prabhul, who ruined his life and family. Meenakshi begs Ramesh to not kill Prabhul as he is her father but Ramesh was firm on his decision. However, he gets beaten up by some goons outside the court. Tharakan and his gang manages to save him.

Enraged, Tharakan and his relatives go to Prabhul's house to seek revenge for trying to kill Black. On seeing him, Meenakshi gets shocked as Moosath earlier informed her that if he gets hit on the head once again, he could never be brought back as Ramesh. To test whether he is Black or Ramesh, Prabhul slaps Shyama, Blessy badly and also him. As he does not react in both the cases, Prabhul confirms that he is insane and tells Tharakan to take him back. Tharakan angrily threatens Prabhul and takes Black away. However, when Prabhul learns that Meenakshi knew of his role on assaulting Ramesh, he takes a gun to kill Ramesh. As Prabhul is about to shoot Ramesh, he is blocked by Ramesh and killed in an ensuing fight.

Black is produced at court once again. However, the court lets him walk away. Everyone is still upset as they think that Ramesh has lost his regained memory. But Ramesh reveals the truth behind his actions. He also learns that Blessy is aware of his real identity and story. The film ends as Ramesh completely changes as Black Cat and is greeted by Tharakan and his gang.

== Cast ==
- Suresh Gopi as Black/Mumbai City Police Commissioner Ramesh Sharma IPS
- Meena as Dr. Meenakshi
- Mukesh as Adv. Dinesh
- Karthika as Blessy Tharakan
- Rajan P. Dev as Tharakan Muthalali
- Nedumudi Venu as Pathrose Mooppan, Black's father
- Jagadish as Vakkachan
- Indrans as George Washington
- Harisree Asokan as Ceaser
- Ashish Vidhyarthi as Mumbai Home Minister Prabhul Kumar
- Thilakan as Moosath
- Mukesh Rishi as ADGP Aggarwal IPS
- Ramu as Prakash Kumar
- Bheeman Raghu as DYSP Vikram Dharma
- Chali Pala as Advocate Krishnamoorthy
- Ponnamma Babu as Nancy, Tharakan's wife
- Jaffar Idukki as Paili
- Kulappulli Leela as Kathreena
- Baburaj as Sunny
- Saju Kodiyan as Mruthyumjayan Namboothiri
- Kalabhavan Santhosh as Bheemasenan
- Geetha Nair as Saraswathi Ammal, Ramesh's mother
- Sajitha Betti as Shyama, Ramesh's sister
- Dimple Rose as Sharanya, Ramesh's sister
- Geetha Salam as Shankaran
- Jayan Cherthala as Muthaliyar
- Machan Varghese as Chacko, a fisherman
- Ravi Vallathol as Justice Chandran Menon
- Jagannatha Varma as Justice Jayachandra Kurup
- Kollam Thulasi as Gopalakrishnan Menon, Prosecutor
- Abu Salim as CI Kishore

== Songs ==
- lyrics - Rajeev Alunkal and Vayalar Sarathchandra Varma
- music - M. Jayachandran and Alphonse Joseph

No.	Title	Artist(s)	Length
1.	"Aathmavin Kavil"	Job Kurian, Amritha Nair
2.	"Munthirikkallu"	Afsal
3.	"Piyathu Piyathu"	KS Chithra, Sujatha Mohan

== Release ==
The film had a delayed release. It received mixed reviews from the critics and audiences alike. While the cast performances received praise, criticism was penned on direction, script and screenplay.
