= Rajan Paranja Kadha =

- Directed by: Mani Swamy
- Written by: Yatheendra Das
- Screenplay by: Vel A. P.
- Produced by: Mani M. K.
- Starring: Kaviyoor Ponnamma; Jose Prakash; Sankaradi; Sukumaran; Janardhanan
- Cinematography: P. S. Nivas
- Edited by: M. S. Mani
- Music by: G. Devarajan
- Production company: Kalabindu
- Distributed by: RR & Kalabindu Release
- Release date: 17 March 1978
- Country: India
- Language: Malayalam

Rajan Paranja Kadha (transl. Story told by Rajan) is a 1978 Indian Malayalam-language crime film directed by Mani Swamy and produced by Mani M. K. The film stars Kaviyoor Ponnamma, Jose Prakash, Sankaradi and Sukumaran. The film has musical score by G. Devarajan.

== Cast ==
- Sukumaran
- M. G. Soman
- Janardhanan (actor)
- Kaviyoor Ponnamma
- Jose Prakash
- Sankaradi
- Aboobacker
- Abu Salim

== Soundtrack ==
The music was composed by G. Devarajan and the lyrics were written by P. Bhaskaran.

No.	Song	Singers	Lyrics	Length (m:ss)
1	"Jananam Ninne"	K. J. Yesudas	P. Bhaskaran	
2	"Kaamaari Bhagavaante"	P. Madhuri	P. Bhaskaran	
