= Malayali Mamanu Vanakkam =

2002 Malayalam movie

- Directed by: Rajasenan
- Written by: Udayakrishna-Siby K. Thomas
- Produced by: B Rakesh
- Starring: Jayaram; Prabhu; Roja; Kalabhavan Mani; Jagathy Sreekumar
- Cinematography: Prathapan
- Edited by: Sreekar Prasad
- Music by: Suresh Peters; Sharreth (Background Score)
- Distributed by: Cinema Cinema
- Release date: 22 February 2002
- Country: India
- Language: Malayalam

Malayali Mamanu Vanakkam (transl. Greetings to the Malayali uncle) is a 2002 Indian Malayalam language film directed by Rajasenan starring Jayaram, Prabhu, Kalabhavan Mani, Jagathy Sreekumar and Roja. It was released on 22 February 2002. The film was dubbed into Tamil as Gounder Veetu Maapillai, with additional scenes featuring Vadivelu, Vennira Aadai Moorthy, M. S. Bhaskar and Lekhasri.

== Plot ==
Anandakuttan's mother wants her daughter Anandavalli to be with the family for Anandakuttan's marriage to Revathy. So he takes up a trip to Tamil Nadu, in search of his sister and her husband Muniyandi, along with his uncle Keshu.

Anandakuttan succeeds in finding his sister and she sends her daughter Parvathy with Anandakuttan to his hometown, to prevent her from marrying Kannayya. However, Parvathy assumes that Anandakuttan is in love with her following the Tamil custom of Muraimaman (where uncles marry their nieces). She falls in love with him and assumes his family also considers her as his fiancée without knowing that he is already engaged with Revathy. Anandakuttan wants to make her aware that in Kerala, it is a prohibited relationship as uncles have a fatherly figure without offending her. So he tries to bring Kannayya to his family to make her fall in love with him. However, she doesn't which results in a major issue in the family once they realised that Parvathy loved Anandakuttan.

== Cast ==
- Jayaram as Anandakuttan
- Prabhu as Periyakulam Aruval Kannaiya
- Kalabhavan Mani as Thirupathy Perumal/Muniyandi
- Jagathy Sreekumar as Kesavan, Anandakuttan's younger uncle
- Roja as Parvathi
- Suja Karthika as Revathi
- Srividya as Sarojini, Anandakuttan's mother
- Shobha Mohan as Anandavalli, Anandakuttan's elder sister
- Oduvil Unnikrishnan as Narayana Kurup, Anandakuttan's elder uncle
- P.Balachandran as Easwaran Pillai, Revathi's father
- Sudheesh as Kammath (lodge receptionist)
- Machan Varghese as Chinnaiya
- Sruthi Nair (Devika Rani) as Vichithra
- Kalliyoor Sasi in a cameo appearance as Anandvalli's first husband

Tamil version

- Vadivelu as 'Vetti' Veru
- Vennira Aadai Moorthy
- M. S. Bhaskar
- Lekhasri

== Soundtrack ==
Soundtrack was composed by Suresh Peters.

Malayalam version

- Kanmaniye - Sreenivasan, Chitra
- Kanmaniye - Sujatha
- Kathala Kathala - Mano, Ganga
- Mama Malayali Mama - MG. Sreekumar, Sujatha
- Thaka Thathom - MG. Sreekumar, Mano
- Vaanil Udikkum - Chitra
- Vaniludikkum - Yesudas

Tamil version

- Kadhalaa Kadhalaa - Mano, Ganga
- Mama Malayala Mama - Mgsree Kumar, Sujatha Mohan
- Thakadhom Thakadhom - Mano, Reshma
- Mannavane Chinnavane - Ganga

== Reception ==
A critic from Cinesouth wrote that "All said & done, the movie is an entertainer. And, a winner. That's all that counts". A critic from Sify wrote that "On the whole, the film is a complete entertainer".
