= Sindhu Menon =

Indian actress

- Born: Bangalore, Karnataka, India
- Occupations: Actress, TV anchor
- Years active: 1994–2012
- Spouse: Prabhu (m. 2010)
- Children: 3

Sindhu Menon is an Indian former actress, who has starred in Kannada, Telugu, Malayalam and Tamil films.

== Early life ==
Sindhu Menon was born in Bangalore, Karnataka, India into a Malayali family. She has an elder brother, Karthik, who worked as a Kannada music channel VJ and turned actor, recently. And also two elder sisters. Sindhu Menon is fluent in several languages: Malayalam, her mother tongue; Telugu, Tamil, Kannada, Hindi and English. She was brought up in her birthplace, Bangalore.

== Career ==
Sindhu Menon, a trained Bharatanatyam dancer from her childhood, got her entry into the film industry when Bhasker Hegde, one of the judges of a Bharatanatyam competition in which Menon participated and emerged as the first place winner, introduced her to Kannada film director K. V. Jayaram, who cast her in his film Rashmi in 1994. Subsequently, she got several offers to act and became a full-time actress, by enacting the female lead role character in the 1999 film Prema Prema Prema, when she was merely 13 years old.

Later, at the age of 15, she entered the Telugu, Malayalam and Tamil film industries as well, by acting in the films Bhadrachalam, Uthaman and Samuthiram, respectively. She went on to act alongside Kannada Star Sudeep in Nandi (2002), Bharathiraja's Kadal Pookkal (2002), Trinetram (2002), Khushi (2003) and got the female lead role in the 2006 Malayalam film Pulijanmam, which was awarded the National Film Award for Best Feature Film in 2007.

Menon then moved to the "small screen", hosting TV shows and acting in serials, which include "Sriman Srimathi" and "Stree Hrudayam", before accepting film offers again. In 2009, she appeared in the Malayalam films, Bharya Onnu Makkal Moonnu, and Rahasya Police. She also acted in the Tamil film Eeram, produced by popular Tamil director S. Shankar. She hosted a popular family reality show in Malayalam named,"Sriman Srimathi".

== Personal life ==
Sindhu Menon married Prabhu, a Tamil Nadu information technology professional on 25 April 2010. The couple have a daughter(Svetlana) and two sons(Sathvik & Suvaan).

== Filmography ==
Year	Title	Role	Language	Notes
1994	Rashmi	Young Rashmipriya	Kannada	As a child artist
1996	Huliya	Puttagowri	Kannada	As a child artist
1998	Kanasalu Neene Manasalu Neene	Sowmiya	Kannada	
1998	Mari Kannu Hori Myage	Vedhavathi	Kannada	
1999	Maha Edabidangi	Soodamani	Kannada	
1999	Prema Prema Prema	Savithri	Kannada	
2001	Bhadrachalam	Mahalakshmi	Telugu	
2001	Uthaman	Gowri	Malayalam	
2001	Samuthiram	Durga	Tamil	
2001	Akashathile Paravakal	Sridevi	Malayalam	
2001	Ee Nadu Innale Vare	Srija	Malayalam	
2001	Aaraam Jaalakam	Swayamprabha	Malayalam	
2001	Kadal Pookkal	Mariyam	Tamil	
2001	Noopuram	-	Malayalam	
2002	Youth	Aruna	Tamil	
2002	Trinetram	Aruna	Telugu	
2002	Nandhi	Divya	Kannada	
2003	Srirama Chandrulu	Pallavi	Telugu	
2003	Inspector	Shivani	Telugu	
2003	Aadanthe Ado Type	Deepthi	Telugu	
2003	Vikram	Divya	Kannada	
2003	Khushi	Chaya	Kannada	
2003	Mr. Brahmachari	Sevanthi	Malayalam	
2004	Dharma	Kavya	Kannada	
2004	Vesham	Veni	Malayalam	
2004	Jyeshta	Gowri	Kannada	Guest appearance
2005	Thommanum Makkalum	Sheela	Malayalam	
2005	Aandavan	SI Srirekha	Malayalam	
2005	Rajamanikyam	Rani Rathnam	Malayalam	
2006	Pulijanmam	Shahnaz / Vellachi	Malayalam	
2006	Pathaaka	Namitha Chawdhari	Malayalam	
2006	Anuvaadamillaathe	Neena	Malayalam	
2006	Vaasthavam	Vimala	Malayalam	
2007	Detective	Reshmi	Malayalam	
2007	Sketch	Lakshmi	Malayalam	
2007	Ayur Rekha			
2007	Chandamama	Maharani	Telugu	
2008	Rainbow	Kamala	Telugu	
2008	Yaare Nee Hudugi	-	Kannada	
2008	Thavalam	Kanakam	Malayalam	
2008	Twenty:20	Padmini Mahendran	Malayalam	
2009	Sidham	Gowri	Telugu	
2009	Bharya Onnu Makkal Moonnu	Rajmohan's wife	Malayalam	
2009	Rahasya Police	Rajan's wife	Malayalam	
2009	Eeram	Ramya/Vaishnavi	Tamil	
2012	Manjadikuru	Sudha Mema	Malayalam	

== TV Serial ==
- Vamsam - Malayalam
- Karthika - Malayalam
