= Inspector Garud =

- Theatrical release poster
- Directed by: Johny Antony
- Written by: Udayakrishna; Siby K. Thomas
- Produced by: Milan Jaleel
- Starring: Dileep; Kavya Madhavan
- Cinematography: P. Sukumar
- Edited by: Ranjan Abraham
- Music by: songs: Alex Paul background score: Ouseppachan
- Production company: Galaxy Films
- Distributed by: Galaxy Films
- Release date: 29 January 2007 (India)
- Running time: 137 minutes
- Country: India
- Language: Malayalam

Inspector Garud is a 2007 Indian Malayalam-language action comedy film directed by Johny Antony, written by the duo Udayakrishna-Siby K. Thomas, starring Dileep and Kavya Madhavan in the lead roles. The film was a commercial success at the box office.

== Synopsis ==
Circle Inspector Madhavan Kutty is a very corrupt and funny officer. He is known as Garud as he is fast as a falcon who would do any dirty work for money. He became Inspector not through the right channel but by paying ₹15 lakhs as a bribe. Hence, he is now bound to get his money back through bribes.

A consignment of arms meant for LTTE reaches Kochi and Karaikkudy Arumuga Palaniyappa Chettiyar is keeping it in a colony run by him. An honest cop Rajan Joseph discovers the plot but is sacked by the Home Minister. Madhavan Kutty saves Chettiyar and at the same time rips him off. Meanwhile, Madhavan Kutty is humiliated by the new Sub Collector, Sethulakshmi, who makes him apologize to her in front of the Women's Commission. He takes revenge by working out a marriage with Sethulakshmi under pressure which leads to further complications.

== Cast ==
- Dileep as CI Madhavan Kutty / Inspector Garud
- Kavya Madhavan as Sub Collector Sethulakshmi IAS
- Innocent as Head Constable Raghavan aka Raghavettan
- Vijayaraghavan as Karaikudi Arumukha Palaniyappa Chettiyar
- Lalu Alex as CI Rajan Joseph
- Anand as Saravanan, Chettiyar's son
- Cochin Haneefa as Govindan, Sethulakshmi's uncle
- Salim Kumar as Lonappan Chakkacham Parambil
- Harisree Ashokan as Kuttappan
- Nawab Shah as Guptaji
- Sadiq as SI Shekharan
- Kalasala Babu as Achuthan Maash, Madhavankutty's father
- Shammi Thilakan as City Police Commissioner P Gopinath IPS
- Aishwarya as District Collector Sandhya Gopinath IAS
- Janardhanan as Krishnan Namboothiri
- Kochu Preman as Sivan Pillai
- Urmila Unni as Sethulakshmi's mother
- Ponnamma Babu as a Member of the Women's Commission
- T. P. Madhavan as Minister Sathyanathan
- Machan Varghese as Kunjunni, a thief
- N. L. Balakrishnan as Vaidyar
- Jagannatha Varma as IG Santhosh Nair IPS
- Kalabhavan Shajohn as Constable Chacko
- Bineesh Kodiyeri as Anand, Sethulakshmi's younger brother
- Suja Menon as Saritha
- Jeny Susan Joseph as Parvathi, Achuthan's daughter
- Abu Salim as Karinchantha Vasu
- Kalabhavan Haneef as Ajayan, Auto driver
- Rani Larius as Chettiyar's wife
- Mini Arun as Susan
- Deepika Mohan
- Baby Nayanthara as Raghavan's granddaughter
- Sudheer Sukumaran as Guptaji's henchman
- Beena Sabu
- Vimal Kumar as Police Constable

== Music ==
Inspector Garud has music given by Alex Paul, while the background score was composed by Ouseppachan. The lyrics were written by Vayalar Sarath Chandra Varma and Santhosh Varma. The film has six songs, in which the playback singers are Jyotsna, Franko, Vineeth Sreenivasan, Rimi Tomy, Afsal, Reju Joseph, Pradeep Babu, and Dileep himself.

Track #	Song	Singer(s)
1	"Nishayile Salabhamaai"	Jyotsna
2	"Kannathe Penne"	Franko
3	"Manmadhanalle"	Vineeth Srinivasan, Rimi Tomy, Dileep
4	"Kanthari Penne"	Afsal
5	"Pathi Kadichu"	Reju Joseph, Pradeep Babu
6	"Kannum Chimmi Chimmi"	Vineeth Srinivasan
