= Parunthu =

- Directed by: M. Padmakumar
- Written by: T. A. Razzaq
- Produced by: Houli Pottoor
- Starring: Mammootty; Jayasurya
- Cinematography: Sanjeev Shankar
- Edited by: Ranjan Abraham
- Music by: Songs: Alex Paul; Background Score: Ouseppachan
- Release date: 18 July 2008
- Running time: 162 minutes
- Country: India
- Language: Malayalam

Parunthu (transl. Eagle) is a 2008 Indian Malayalam-language crime film directed by M. Padmakumar. The film stars Mammootty and Jayasurya. The screenplay was written by T. A. Razzaq.

== Plot ==
Blade Purushottaman, nicknamed Parunthu Purushu for the way he preys on his targets, is a heartless financier. His rude and insulting ways of talking to people who owe him money have hurt many people. Vinayan, a young youth joins Purushu to fight against Kallayi Azeez, who is Purushu's rival from childhood for his family needs.

Once Purushu spoils the betrothal ceremony of Rakhi, the daughter of a Gujarati businessman Hemanth Bhai, who owes Purushu a large sum. After the death of Hemanth Bhai, Rakhi takes money from Azeez. But for Azeez it was a trap and he wants more than money in return. Later, Azeez sends his henchman Prabhakaran to attack Purushu and brings him close to death. He is saved by Rakhi's sister Bhuvana and Vinayan. This changes Purushu and he decides to be a good man from then. The rest of the movie is about whether the people can accept him in his new character.

== Cast ==
- Mammootty as Parunthu Purushothaman
  - Abhinav Subaj CP as Young Purushu
- Jayasurya as Vinayan
- Cochin Haneefa as Kunjachan
- Suraj Venjaramoodu as Mahendran
- Jagathy Sreekumar as Hemanth Bhai
- Jayan Cherthala as Kallayi Azeez
- Saiju Kurup as Vineeth
- Lakshmi Rai as Rakhi
- Poornitha as Bhuvana
- Devan as Mahesh, Vineeth's brother
- Manka Mahesh as Vineeth's mother
- K. P. A. C. Lalitha as Narayaniamma
- Sabitha Anand as Kumariyamma, Purushu's mother
- Augustine as Kumaran
- Mamukkoya as Kunjikka
- Jayakrishnan as CI Soman
- Balachandran Chullikkadu as Abraham
- Abu Salim as Puli Prabhakaran
- Lakshana (actress) as Seetha
- Sreelatha Namboothiri as Seetha's grandmother
- Anil Murali as Sanjay, Seetha's husband
- Saju Kodiyan as Panicker
- Ambika Mohan as Vinayan's mother

== Songs ==
The film score was composed by Ouseppachan while the songs were by Alex Paul with lyrics written by Kanesh Punoor, Anil Panachooran and Sharath Vayalar.

Track #	Song	Artist(s)	Raga
1	"Enthorishtamanen"	Shahbaaz Amaan, Durga	
2	"Thumbi Thumbi"	Anitha Sheikh	Mohanam
3	"Poo Mayile"	M. G. Sreekumar	Arabhi
4	"Nee Cheiytha Karmangal"	P. Jayachandran	
