= Pallavur Devanarayanan =

- Poster
- Directed by: V. M. Vinu
- Written by: Gireesh Puthenchery
- Produced by: M. Mani
- Starring: Mammootty; Sangita; Manthra; Thilakan; Kaviyoor Ponnamma
- Cinematography: Venugopal
- Edited by: K. P. Hariharaputhran
- Music by: Raveendran
- Distributed by: Sunitha Productions
- Release date: 10 August 1999
- Running time: 155 minutes
- Country: India
- Language: Malayalam

Pallavur Devanarayanan is a 1999 Malayalam drama film, written by Gireesh Puthenchery and directed by V. M. Vinu, in which Mammootty plays the title role, Pallavur Devanarayanan. The music for the film was composed by Raveendran and the lyrics were penned by Gireesh Puthenchery. One of the songs was sung by Mammootty himself.

== Cast ==
- Mammootty as Pallavur Devanarayana Pothuval aka Devan
- Sangita as Vasundhara
- Manthra as Seethalakshmi
- Thilakan as Pallavur Sreekanta Pothuval
- Kaviyoor Ponnamma as Bhageerathi
- N. F. Varghese as Mezhathoor Vaidyamatam Nampoothiri
- Jagadish as Kumaran
- Kalabhavan Mani as Vasu
- Sai Kumar as Zachariah
- Nedumudi Venu as Aasan
- Devan as Brahmadathan
- Maniyanpilla Raju as Manavedhan Nampoothiri
- Madhupal as Poojari
- Sukumari as Oppol
- Oduvil Unnikrishnan as Achuthan Marar
- Kozhikode Narayanan Nair as Sankara Pothuval
- Shivaji as Chandrabhanu
- Mariya as Prabhamayi
- Kuthiravattam Pappu as Kunjiraman
- V. K. Sriraman as Mohanakrishnan
- T. P. Madhavan as Rajeshekharan
- Tony as Vasundhara's Brother
- C. I. Paul as Rappayi
- Abu Salim as Ananthan
- Anila Sreekumar
- Yamuna
- Rekha Ratheesh

== Soundtrack ==
Pallavur Devanarayanan

Soundtrack album by Raveendran
- Released: 1999
- Genre: Film soundtrack
- Label: East Coast

The songs were composed by Raveendran, with lyrics by Gireesh Puthenchery. The song "Poliyopoli Pookkula" was sung by Mammootty himself.

Track #	Song	Artist(s)	Length
1	"Pularinilavu"	K. J. Yesudas	3:46
2	"Varthinkalal"	K. S. Chithra, K. J. Yesudas	5:11
3	"Sindooraruna Vigraha Sloka"	K. S. Chithra	2:42
4	"Elappulayante Nadu"	M. G. Sreekumar	2:33
5	"Poliyopoli Pookkula"	Mammootty, Chorus	4:38
6	"Sanchara Radha" (Ashtapathi)	K. J. Yesudas	3:09
7	"Varthinkalal"	K. J. Yesudas	5:11

== Reception ==
Deccan Herald wrote that "Story, screenplay, dialogue and lyrics by Girish Puttenchery needs a special mention with nay a dragging moment. Direction by Vinu is also good. Tilakan, Kaviyoor and N F Varghese and Sangeetha render their roles well. Needless to say, Mammootty steals the show. He plays the common drunk as well as the repentant husband or son. Looks like the superstar had a whale of a time, especially in those scenes of cackling, hooting and stumbling with Jagdish and Kalabavan Mani playing second fiddle".
