= Roudram =

- Directed by: Renji Panicker
- Written by: Renji Panicker
- Produced by: Shahul Hameed Marikar; Anto Joseph
- Starring: Mammootty; Sai Kumar; Manju
- Cinematography: Sanjeev Shankar
- Edited by: Donmax
- Music by: Rajamani
- Distributed by: Marikar Films
- Release date: 31 January 2008
- Country: India
- Language: Malayalam

Roudram is a 2008 Indian Malayalam-language action crime thriller film written and directed by Renji Panicker. It stars Mammootty, Sai Kumar, Vijayaraghavan and Rajan P Dev.

== Plot ==
In Kochi, Kambilikkandam Jose is a drug baron who arrives to meet Pattakkalil Purushothaman "Appichai" Pilla, one of the largest drug dealers in South India, for a massive hike in his commission. Appichai arrives, along with his foster son Sethumadhavan "Sethu". Appichai calls Sethu, who is on a cruise in Goa. Upon his return to Kochi, Sethu kills Jose with the help from IG Balagopal. The death brings on a strong protest inside the state, causing the C.M. to order a detailed investigation.

ACP Narendran "Nari", is in-charge of the inquiry. Widely known for his aggressive and belligerent behavior, Nari begins the investigation by questioning Dr. Ratnakumari (the assistant surgeon who conducted the postmortem examination on Jose). Nari finds the marks of physical attack on Jose's face that were not reported, where he reaches out to meet Jose's family, but all of them are found dead the next day. Sethu, who holds an illegal business partnership with the C.M.'s son Jeevan, one of the most influential businessmen in the country.

Hiding in an ashram named Karunyadeepam, under Rema Behan, Sethu runs a drug cartel. Through his investigative methods, Narendran reaches out to Rema Behan, who is found dead the following day. Eventually, Narendran encounters obstacles, including Jeevan and several senior cops, where he is discharged from the investigation, but Narendran blackmails the C.M. with a video clip on Jeevan, given by Sethu. The C.M. lets Narendran to begin with the investigation.

Narendran arrests Sethu, who threatened Appichai, since Narendran had given him 24 hours to reveal information on Sethu. When Narendran and Sethu arrives at a safe place. Helen's brothers arrive and tries to kill Sethu, but Narendran kills them instead. Sethu shoots Narendran in the arm, and Narendra responds by shooting Sethu in the leg, where he also shoots the car hanging from the garage ceiling, which crushes Sethu's legs. Narendra leaves the garage along with Shihabudden, Thomas and Hamza, while Sethu bleeds to death.

== Cast ==
- Mammootty as ACP Narendran alias Nari
- Sai Kumar as Sethumadhavan "Sethu" aka Sethumohandas
- Vijayaraghavan as Pattakkalil Purushothaman "Appichayi" Pillai, Sethu's godfather
- Rajan P Dev as IG Mohammed Shihabudeen IPS, Nari's mentor
- Lalu Alex as SP Thomas Antony IPS, Nari's childhood friend
- Manju Benjamin as Prabha Narendran, Nari's wife
- Spadikam George as ASIVeerabhadra Kurup
- Prakash as SI Musthafa
- Janardhanan as Chief Minister C. K
- Jayan Cherthala as CI Jalapalan
- Jayakrishnan as Chief Minister's son
- Sona Heiden as Subhadra
- Ramu as IG Balagopal IPS
- Abu Salim as CI Hamsa
- Shammi Thilakan as DySP Roy Chandy
- Sreelatha Namboothiri as Chief Minister's wife
- Subair as Kambilikandam Jose
- Prabha Dutt as Rema Behan/Rema Bai
- Venu Nagavally as Doctor, Nari's friend
- Balachandran Chullikkadu as Doctor Surendran
- Nawab Shah as Michael Chorda, Sethu's friend
- Bindu Panicker as Shihabudeen's wife
- Urmila Unni as Dr.Ratnakumari, I.G. Balagopal's wife
- T. P. Madhavan as ASI Ayyappan Nair
- Sonia as Nirmala
- Maya Moushmi as Valsamma, Jose's wife
- Mohan Jose as Rajakkad Chellappa
- Kundara Johny as DYSP Hameed
- Jaffar Idukki as Sulaiman, Police constable
- Manjusha Sajish as Meera

== Release ==
Roudram was released on 25 January 2008 in India, with a subsequent release on 6 March 2008 in Kuwait. The film became a commercial success at the box office.
