= Pachakuthira =

- Promotional poster
- Directed by: Kamal
- Screenplay by: T. A. Shahid
- Story by: Dileep
- Produced by: Babu Shahir
- Starring: Dileep; Gopika; Siddique; Salim Kumar
- Cinematography: P. Sukumar
- Music by: Ilaiyaraaja
- Distributed by: Varnachithra
- Release date: 14 April 2006
- Running time: 150 minutes
- Country: India
- Language: Malayalam

Pachakuthira (transl. Grasshopper) is a 2006 Indian Malayalam-language comedy drama film directed by Kamal and written by T. A. Shahid from a story by Dileep, starring himself in dual role and Gopika and Salim Kumar in supporting role. The film was released on Vishu 2006.

== Plot ==
Anandakkuttan, a junior artist in movies, takes up the responsibility of looking after his long-lost German brother, Akash Menon. However, as Akash is mentally disabled due to autism, he causes trouble to everyone around him, including the neighbors. Initially, Anandakuttan finds the troublesome Akash annoying and hates him, but ultimately develops love and a deep connection towards Akash.

== Cast ==
- Dileep in dual role as:
  - Anandakuttan Menon (Anand)
  - Akash Menon
- Gopika as Nimmy, Anandakuttan's love interest
- Salim Kumar as Chandran Karothpadi
- Siddique as Samuel Issac, Akash's adopted father
- Rekha as Akash's adopted mother
- Edavela Babu as Subair, a travel agent
- Indrans as Abraham Lincoln, production controller
- Kalasala Babu as Sugunan, Nimmy's father
- Shamna Kasim as Raji, Nimmy's sister
- Nimisha Suresh as Diya
- Kalabhavan Shajon as Usman, a driver who is Anandakuttan's friend
- Suraj Venjaramoodu as a police officer
- Munshi Venu as Kunjappan
- Rajan P. Dev as Keshavan
- Viji Thampi as Himself
- Jayaraj as Himself
- Rosshan Andrrews as Himself
- Fazil as Himself
- Baburaj as Himself
- Mafia Sasi as himself
- Machan Varghese
- Mamukkoya as Kunjikka
- Biju Kuttan as Jeevan
- Kalabhavan Haneef as ATM security
- Dinesh Prabhakar as Junior Artist
- Vijeesh
- Sangeetha Shivan
- Saranya Mohan as the Kashmiri girl in the shooting spot shown at the beginning of the movie
- Suhasini as Anandakuttan's and Akash's mother (photos only)
- Rony David
- Kozhikode Sarada
- Kalabhavan Prajod as Raman
- Kalabhavan Santhosh
- Kottayam Pradeep

== Soundtrack ==
All songs were written by Gireesh Puthenchery and composed by Ilaiyaraaja.

1. "Oru Thottaavaadi" - Jyotsna Radhakrishnan, Vijay Yesudas
2. "Kalikonda" - MG Sreekumar
3. "Butterfly" - Karthik, Bhavatharani
4. "Varavelkkumo" - Madhu Balakrishnan, Jyotsna Radhakrishnan
