= Suja Karthika =

Indian actress

- Occupation: Actress
- Years active: 2002–2007
- Spouse: Rakesh Krishnan (2010-present)
- Children: 2

Suja Karthika is an Indian actress and dancer who has appeared in Malayalam films. She Holds a PhD in commerce from Cochin University of Science and Technology. She currently teaches at the Lee Shau Kee School of Business and Administration of Hong Kong Metropolitan University

Karthika's debut film was the 2002, Rajasenan film Malayali Mamanu Vanakkam. Her well known roles include in films such as Paadam Onnu: Oru Vilapam (2003), Runway (2004), Nerariyan CBI (2005), Achanurangatha Veedu (2006), and Nadiya Kollappetta Rathri (2007). She has appeared in some television serials as well. She is a gold medalist in MBA from MG University. After that she entered as a teacher at SCMS, Aluva and currently teaches at Marian Academy of Management Studies, Puthuppaady, Kothamangalam. Her father Sundareshan serves as the director in the same college.

== Personal life ==
Suja Karthika was born to Sundareshan & Jaya. She got married on 31 January 2010 to a Mumbai based Merchant Navy engineer Rakesh Krishnan. They have a son Ritwik born on 7 February 2013.

== Filmography ==
Year	Title	Role	Notes
2013	Lisammayude Veedu	Young Treesa (Uncredited cameo)	Archive footage Shot from Achanurangatha Veedu
2007	Nadiya Kollappetta Rathri	Thulasimani	
2007	Rakshakan	Indu	
2007	Nanma	Seetha	
2006	Mouryan	Shankari	
2006	Mahha Samudram	Chandrika	
2006	Kilukkam Kilukilukkam	Devi	
2006	Achanurangatha Veedu	Treesa	
2006	Parayam	Lekha	
2006	Kaala Bazaar		
2005	Lokanathan IAS	Maya	
2005	Nerariyan CBI	Reshmi	
2005	Pauran	Lalithambika's daughter	
2005	Soumyam		
2005	Ponmudipuzhayorathu	Radhika	
2004	Maampazhakkaalam	Kavitha	
2004	Natturajavu	Rosy	
2004	Thudakkam	Gayathri	
2004	Ee Snehatheerathu	Divya	
2004	Runway	Ambili	
2004	Njan Salperu Ramankutty	Ramankutty's sister	
2004	Viralthumpilaaro		
2003	Paadam Onnu: Oru Vilapam	Janakikutty	
2002	Kounder Veettu Mappillai	Revathi	Tamil version
2002	Malayali Mamanu Vanakkam	Revathy	Debut film

== Television Serials ==
- 2001- Swararagam (Asianet)
- 2005- Nokketha Doorath (Asianet)
- 2005- Krishna
- 2006- Neelakkurinji Veendum Pookkunnu (Surya TV)
- Devidarshanam - album
- 2007- Neekkam (Telefilm for Amrita TV co-starring Murali Gopi, V.K. Sreeraman, Mahesh etc.) as Meera
- 2020- Sri Ayyappa Punnya Darsanam (Story Telling Movie)

== Other works ==
- Onachithrangal as Host
- Pranayam Madhuram as Host
- Sensations as Host
- Sweet Dreams as Host
- Marriage Talk as Host
- Smart Show as Participant
- Fast Track as Presenter
