= Uthaman (2001 film) =

2001 film

- Directed by: Anil-Babu
- Written by: T. A. Razzaq
- Produced by: C Subramanya Menon; J Jayaraj
- Starring: Jayaram; Sindhu Menon; Siddique; Sangeetha; Babu Antony
- Cinematography: Shaji Kumar
- Edited by: P. C. Mohan
- Music by: Johnson
- Release date: 21 September 2001
- Country: India
- Language: Malayalam

Uthaman is a 2001 Indian Malayalam-language drama film directed by Anil - Babu and written by T. A. Razzaq, starring Jayaram, Siddique, Sindhu Menon, Sangeetha, Babu Antony and Meghanathan. The music was composed by Johnson.

== Plot ==
Uthaman, an orphan, puts his life in jeopardy when he accepts the blame for a murder committed by a member of the family he is living with. Soon, the siblings of the deceased decide to seek revenge.

== Cast ==
- Jayaram as Uthaman
- Siddique as SI Jayaraj
- Kaviyoor Ponnamma as Uthaman's and Jayaraj's Mother
- Sindhu Menon as Gouri
- Sangeetha as Devika
- Innocent as ASI Cheriyan
- KPAC Lalitha as Gouri's Mother
- Nedumudi Venu as Kochantony
- Babu Antony as Pulimuttathu Sunny Thomas
- Meghanathan as Pulimuttathu Alexi Thomas
- Baburaj as Ashokan
- CI Paul as Kanaran, Jayaraj's uncle and Devika's father
- Indrans as Head Contable Ismayil
- Kochu Preman as Head Constable Padmanabha Pillai
- Machan Varghese as Manikandan
- Kozhikode Narayanan Nair as Beeranikka
- Zeenath as Saramma, Cheriyan's wife
- Kannur Sreelatha

== Soundtrack ==
The film's soundtrack contains 5 songs, all composed by Johnson and lyrics by Kaithapram.

#	Title	Singer(s)
1	"Paalaazhi Theeram Kandu Njan (M)"	K. J. Yesudas
2	"Paalaazhi Theeram Kandu Njan (F)"	Gayatri Asokan
3	"Anthikkudam"	M. G. Sreekumar
4	"Kadalum Kadangalum"	K. L. Sreeram
5	"Pathinezhin Azhakaay"	K. J. Yesudas, K. S. Chitra
