= Pauran =

Indian film

- Directed by: Sundar Das
- Written by: Sajeevan
- Produced by: Sunil Baby
- Starring: Jayaram; Kalabhavan Mani; Geetu Mohandas
- Cinematography: Anandakuttan
- Edited by: K. Bhoominathan
- Music by: Raghukumar
- Distributed by: Dolphin Creations, Sreemovies
- Release date: 3 June 2005
- Country: India
- Language: Malayalam

Pauran (English: Citizen) is a 2005 Malayalam political thriller film directed by Sundardas featuring Jayaram, Kalabhavan Mani and Geetu Mohandas in the lead roles. The film was a box-office disaster.

== Plot ==
Divakaran (Jayaram), son of martyr Karunakaran, is well accepted in his village. He takes part in an election and becomes an MLA under the panel of the Communist party. Divakaran was sorrowful about some of his party tactics. He expressed his disdain and firmly opposed a move to stage strikes involving students. He started objecting against the party misdeeds which provoked the party leaders and soon he became an outcast. However, in the end he is brutally killed by his political enemies who burn him alive.

== Cast ==
- Jayaram as MLA Divakaran
- Kalabhavan Mani as Komalan
- Sai Kumar as Gopalji
- Vijayaraghavan as Bhargavan
- Riyaz Khan as MLA Thomachan
- Jishnu as Shivadasan Nair
- Babu Namboothiri as Chacko
- Geetu Mohandas as Aani
- Venu Nagavalli as Chief Minister
- Augustine as Koshy
- T. P. Madhavan as Narayanan
- Abu Salim as Local Gunda
- Kollam Thulasi as minister
- KPAC Lalitha as Janaki
- Urmila Unni
- Suja Karthika
- Sukumari as minister
- Ponnamma Babu as Dr. Ponnamma

== Songs ==
The songs of the movie were composed by Raghukumar, with lyrics by Gireesh Puthenchery. The background music was done by Rajamani.

1. "Mauna Nombara": M. G. Sreekumar, Ranjini Jose
2. "Oru Nullu Bhasmamay": P. Jayachandran
3. "Thamarappoove": K. S. Chithra
4. "Lal Salam": Afsal, Devanand, Vidya Suresh
