= Akashathile Paravakal =

2001 film by V. M. Vinu

- Directed by: V. M. Vinu
- Written by: Johnson Esthappan
- Produced by: Feroz
- Starring: Kalabhavan Mani; Sindhu Menon; I. M. Vijayan; Jagathy Sreekumar; Kaviyoor Ponnamma; Indrans
- Cinematography: Utpal V.Nayanar
- Edited by: K. P. Hariharaputhran
- Music by: S. Balakrishnan: (Songs); Rajamani: (Background Music)
- Distributed by: Niya Release
- Release date: 2001
- Country: India
- Language: Malayalam

Akashathile Paravakal (English:The Birds of the Sky) is a 2001 Malayalam language film produced by Feroz. The film is directed by V. M. Vinu, and stars Kalabhavan Mani and Sindhu Menon in the lead roles along with I. M. Vijayan, Kaviyoor Ponnamma, Jagathy Sreekumar and Indrans. The music was composed by S. Balakrishnan and Rajamani. The film is based on a story written by Johnson Esthappan. The film was commercially successful.

== Plot ==
The story is based on Chandanakkunnu panchayat, where rabies due to dog bites has become a fearsome epidemic. People in the panchayat seek all ways to kill the affected dogs. The incumbent panchayat president is challenged by Dasappan raising the insecurity the disease has spread in the place. To gain public support, Dasappan brings Udumbu Vasu to the panchayat to kill the dogs. Vasu is lodged in Muthassi's house. Muthassi's granddaughter Sreedevi falls in love with Vasu after hearing about his orphaned life after his mother's death from a dog bite. Meanwhile, a dreaded gangster and criminal Walayar Manikyam, who killed Sreedevi's father, makes a ruckus in the house for getting him arrested. Vasu and Manikyam get instigated in a fight after Manikyam misbehaves with Sreedevi, where Manikyam vows revenge on Vasu. While killing two dogs, Vasu gets bitten by one of them and the next day, he gets rabies. Manikyam uses this situation to kill Vasu, but he ends up getting killed by Vasu. In order to save Vasu from being killed by the villagers, Muthassi kills him. Everyone in the village weeps at his death.

== Cast ==
- Kalabhavan Mani as Udumbu Vasu
- Sindhu Menon as Sreedevi
- Kaviyoor Ponnamma as Muthassi
- I. M. Vijayan as Walayar Manikyam
- Jagathy Sreekumar as Dasappan
- K. T. S. Padannayil as Dasappan's father
- Indrans as Kuttappan
- Augustine as Govindan
- C. I. Paul as Panchayat President Raghavan
- Manka Mahesh as Raghavan's wife
- V. M. Vinu as Doctor
- Anu Anand as Unni
- Bindu Varappuzha as Mariamma

== Soundtrack ==
- "Angadiveedinu"- M. G. Sreekumar
- "Kalabhakuriyitta"- M. G. Sreekumar, Jayachandran
- "Ponnumkudathinu"- K. J. Yesudas, S. Janaki
- "Thathapennu"- Madhu Balakrishnan, K. S. Chithra
- "Kaattunjalidaam"- S. Janaki, M. G. Sreekumar
- "Mooparrkoru"- Madhu Balakrishnan
- "Varuthanteoppam"- Kalabhavan Mani
