= Natturajavu =

2004 Indian film

Naatturajavu
- DVD cover
- Directed by: Shaji Kailas
- Written by: T. A. Shahid
- Produced by: Antony Perumbavoor
- Starring: Mohanlal; Meena; Nayanthara; Kalabhavan Mani
- Cinematography: Anandakuttan
- Edited by: L. Bhoominathan
- Music by: M. Jayachandran (songs); Rajamani (score)
- Production company: Aashirvad Cinemas
- Distributed by: Aroma Movie International
- Release date: 20 August 2004 (India)
- Running time: 150 minutes
- Country: India
- Language: Malayalam

Naatturajavu (transl. Land King) is a 2004 Indian Malayalam-language action drama film directed by Shaji Kailas and written by T. A. Shahid. The film stars Mohanlal in the lead role and Meena, Nayanthara, Kalabhavan Mani, Manoj K Jayan and Ranjith in supporting roles while Siddique makes a Cameo Appearance. M. Jayachandran composed the film's soundtrack. It was produced by Antony Perumbavoor through Aashirvad Cinemas. Naatturajavu was released in India on 20 August 2004, the film performed well at the box office, becoming one of the highest-grossing Malayalam films of the year.

== Plot ==
Pulikkattil Charlie is a nasrani from Travancore, who has struggled hard to take care of his business empire after the death of his father Pulikkattil Mathachan. Charlie's father was a ruthless feudal landlord, who, during his lifetime, had done several heinous crimes. Charlie is now helping all those who had once suffered from the hands of his father.

Mani Kuttan, the son of an ironsmith burned to death by Mathachan for demanding title deed proving his rights on land ownership, is brought up by Charlie as a loving younger brother and a trusted confidant. After suffering a small injury as part of a squabble with Antappan, Manikuttan emotionally recollects witnessing, as a child, the dreadful killing of his parents by Mathachan at night.

Charlie is married to a girl named Maya, whose family was annihilated by his father using trained wild dogs, barring her brother Karnan. As retribution, Pulikkattil Mathachan was brutally stabbed to death by Karnan, exacting his revenge, eight years before. While being captured by the police after the murder, Karnan vowed to eliminate the remaining heir of the Pulikkattil family, thus specifying his intention to kill Charlie. For the murder of Mathachan, Karnan is imprisoned for eight years.

Though being a Hindu, Maya is looked after lovingly by Charlie and she too loves him very much. The couple have a toddler son too. Karnan is unaware of the fact that his sister is married to Charlie. Later, he realizes that Charlie is a goodhearted person and gives up revenge and apologizes to Charlie.

== Cast ==
- Mohanlal as Pulikkattil Charlie a.k.a Natturajavu
- Meena as Maya, Charlie's Wife
- Nayanthara as Kathrina, Charlie's sister
- Kalabhavan Mani as Manikuttan, Charlie's Right hand
- Ranjith as Karnan, Maya's Brother
- Vijayaraghavan as Sunny, Charlie's Cousin
- Manoj K. Jayan as Antappan
- Kaviyoor Ponnamma as Charlie's Mother
- K. P. A. C. Lalitha as Achamma / Thathammachi, Charlie's Grandmother
- Mahadevan as Pulikkattil Mathachan, Charlie's Father
- Rajan P. Dev as Captain Menon, Mathachan and Charlie's Friend
- Janardhanan as Fr. Pappachan, Charlie's Uncle
- Vijayakumar as Advocate Isaac, Charlie's Friend and Lawyer
- Bindu Panicker as Thankamma, Antappan's Mother
- Augustine as Morayur Bappu / Bapputty
- Spadikam George as Ousepp, Antappan's Uncle
- Santhosh as Alex, Antappan's Uncle
- Sarath Das as Pulikkattil Simon, Charlie's Younger Brother
- Suja Karthika as Rosy Simon, Charlie's Sister-in-Law
- Siddique as Pathiriveettil Johnykutty
- T. P. Madhavan as Zachariah, Secretary
- M. S. Thripunithura as Kurup
- J. Pallassery as Kunjali
- Ottapalam Pappan as Kanaran
- Jayakrishnan as Dr. IV Thomas
- Geetha Vijayan as Sunny's Wife
- Kollam Ajith as Goonda
- Susheel Kumar as Church Priest

== Production ==
The filming progressed in Wadakkancherry, Thrissur district in June 2004. The film shot promo videos and recorded songs for television audience for the pre-release promotions, which was an emerging marketing method in Malayalam film industry at that time. The promo videos were directed by Rajesh Divakaran and edited by Don Max. The songs recorded for the purpose were not included in the film—written Joy Thamalam and composed by Sajjan Madhavan, son of Raveendran. The satellite rights of the film was acquired by Surya TV and later in 2020, it was renewed by Asianet.

== Soundtrack ==
Naatturajavu

Soundtrack album by M. Jayachandran
- Released: 1 May 2004
- Genre: Feature film soundtrack
- Language: Malayalam
- Label: East Coast Audio Entertainments

M. Jayachandran chronology
Mayilattam (2004)	Naatturajavu (2004)	Sathyam (2004)

The soundtrack composed by M. Jayachandran consists of 7 tracks. Lyrics for all songs were written by Gireesh Puthenchery, except the poem "Vande Mataram" by Bankim Chandra Chattopadhyay. The soundtrack was released on 1 May 2004 by East Coast Audio Entertainments.

Naatturajavu (Original Motion Picture Soundtrack)
No.	Title	Singer(s)	Length
1.	"Meymasam" (Duet)	M. G. Sreekumar, Sujatha Mohan	4:55
2.	"Chingapadayude Rajave"	Afsal, Rajesh Vijay	3:46
3.	"Kuthuvay Kurumbi" (Duet)	M. G. Sreekumar, K. S. Chithra	4:51
4.	"Vande Mataram"	Madhu Balakrishnan	2:54
5.	"Meymasam" (Female vocals)	Sujatha Mohan	4:50
6.	"Kuthuvay Kurumbi" (Male vocals)	M. G. Sreekumar	4:50
7.	"Sindrella Sindrella"	Alex Kayyalakkal, Jyotsna Radhakrishnan	4:30

== Box office ==
Naatturajavu was released on 20 August 2004 during Onam in Kerala. The film had a strong opening weekend in Kerala, grossing ₹1.12 crore from 54 stations in three days, and had good run particularly in Kozhikode and Thiruvananthapuram regions. It was the highest-grossing film among the Onam releases; according to Sify: "the only winner among the Onam releases". It was made on a budget of ₹1.75 crore, in 35 days, the film earned ₹2.27 crore as distributor's share alone from 51 stations. After that, it managed to run with 35 – 40 percent occupancy in Kerala theatres. Naatturajavu was the third highest-grossing Malayalam film of the year.
