= Ali Bhai =

- Directed by: Shaji Kailas
- Written by: T. A. Shahid
- Produced by: Antony Perumbavoor
- Starring: Mohanlal; Gopika
- Cinematography: S. Saravanan
- Edited by: Don Max
- Music by: Alex Paul
- Production company: Aashirvad Cinemas
- Distributed by: Central Pictures; Pyramid Saimira Ltd.
- Release date: 15 August 2007
- Running time: 138 minutes
- Country: India
- Language: Malayalam

Ali Bhai (transl. Bro Ali) is a 2007 Indian Malayalam-language action drama film directed by Shaji Kailas, written by T. A. Shahid, and produced by Antony Perumbavoor through the company Aashirvad Cinemas. It stars Mohanlal as Anwar Ali alias Ali Bhai, an undisputed leader in Kozhikode Palayam market and the savior of the poor. The character is based on the real-life person Ali Bappu, who lived in Kondotty a decade ago. The film also features Gopika and Shamna Kasim in female lead roles. The plot is set in Kozhikode market and people whose livelihood depends on it, and also shows the culture of the traditional Barami Muslim community, who migrated from Yemen to Kozhikode centuries ago for trading and are known for making Urus. The plot follows Anwar Ali, a member of a Barami family, who flees home when he is wrongly accused of a theft. He moves to Kozhikode market and grew up as Ali Bhai, the protector of the market.

The film completed its post-production in Chennai. The film was released on Independence Day (15 August 2007) and during Onam festival. Chennai-based Pyramid Saimira Group distributed the film outside Kerala. It was released in over 85 screens in Kerala, which was the largest release for a Malayalam film at that time. The film collected 84 lakhs on its first day, making it the highest ever first day gross for a Malayalam film at that time.

== Plot ==
Alibhai tells the story of Anwar Ali, alias Alibhai, a King "Dadha" of Palayam market, Kozhikode. He is the unquestionable hero in that area and savior of the poor and downtrodden. The movie opens with flashback sequences that establish Ali, who was a member of a Barami family famous for making Urus, who leaves his home in his childhood when his father, Khalid Ahmed Sahib, mistakes him for being an unexpected thief and beats him black and blue in front of people. Ali's friend, Sundaran Thampi, tells the mob he saw the theft which was actually done by himself for avenging his father's rivalry with Ahmad Sahib. Ali, knowing he was cheated by his friend, grabs a butcher sword and chops off his right hand and flees from his home to the Palayam market. He never backs out from a fight where he grows up as Alibhai, an undisputed leader of the proletarian class, one who stands up to speak for them and even to clench his fists and fight for them and their rights. The son grows up to be a good-hearted toughie.

Centered around Alibhai, an influential market figure, the film explores his network of loyal companions, dependents, and allies. His inner circle includes his mentor Market Kunji, a devoted crew of friends, his foster daughter Kingini, and the flower vendor Chenthamara, who holds deep affection for him. After providing shelter to a vulnerable young woman named Ganga and caring for Abraham a former rival turned bedridden dependent following a decisive duel Alibhai must navigate the complex social dynamics, loyalties, and conflicts within the Palayam market community.

Once in a while, Alibhai goes to his own house to meet his mother and to secretly leave behind a gift for his father, whom he loves dearly. But all this is destined to change when Sundaran, who was actually the one who had plotted against Ali in his childhood, resurfaces after a long time and with a remorseful heart and begs of Ali to forgive him and to return home. At almost the same time, someone else appears – Daniel Abraham, the son of Ammu Bhai, who has certain motives of his own. From here, Alibhai's life is destined to change dramatically. They wanted to drive out Alibhai from the market and build a shopping mall with the help of local politicians. They are hand in glove with the city corporation and the state administration and are having the aid of big investors from foreign countries. They are into anything, to settle their old scores and change the Kozhikode city into an international tourist centre which provides fun, wine and women. At one stage, they planted a bomb and killed many of his friends and neighbours, including Kingini. Alibhai kills Daniel and his men single-handedly and become the godfather of that area.

== Cast ==
- Mohanlal as Anwar Ali (Ali Bhai)
  - Arun Kumar as Young Ali
- Gopika as Ganga
- Shamna Kasim as Kingini
- Aryaman D Shetty as Daniel "Dan" Abraham (voiceover by Vijay Menon)
- Siddique as Sundaran Thampi
- Cochin Haneefa as Market Kunjikkannan
- Innocent as Khalid Ahmed Sahib, Anwar's father
- Anand as City Police Commissioner Bandadukka Bhaskaran IPS
- Jagadish as Kallankari Dasappan
- Suraj Venjaramoodu as Podipatty Kunjachu
- Sudheesh as Sameer Das
- K. B. Ganesh Kumar as Thirandi Ramu
- Shammi Thilakan as Vakkathi Vareed
- Vijayakumar as Vijayan
- Santhosh Jogi as Salim Babu
- Sai Kumar as Abraham (Ambu Bhai)
- K. P. A. C. Lalitha as Canteen Ammayi
- Chitra Shenoy as Alibhai's mother
- Zeenath as Amminiyamma
- T. G. Ravi as Maison Narayanan
- Kozhikode Narayanan Nair as Kunjali
- V. K. Sreeraman as DYSP Hamid
- Augustine as Nandan
- Antony Perumbavoor as Bus Driver Koya
- Baburaj as Musthaq
- Besant Ravi as Pattani Paramashivam
- Santhosh as Shankaran, Ganga's cousin
- Kiran Raj
- Chali Pala as Shahul
- Krishna Prasad
- Rajan P. Dev as Karunakaran Thampi, Sundaran's father
- Balachandran Chullikkadu as Calicut Collector Sukumaran Nair
- Fathima Babu as Ambu Bhai's wife and Dan's mother
- Saranya Sasi
- Ganapathi S. Poduval as Ganapathi
- Navya Nair as Chenthamara

== Filming ==
The film pooja ceremony was held at Vismayas Max Studio in Thiruvananthapuram on 21 May 2007 coinciding with Mohanlal's birthday. It was a rare pooja function in Mollywood, around 3000 of his fans attended the function for the birthday celebration.

The film was shot in Kozhikode and Pollachi. The art director of the film Bobban has erected a huge set for the film depicting Valiyangadi market, which resembles the original to the core. "As it is very hard for Lal sir to shoot amidst his great fans in Kozhikode market, we were forced to recreate the market here", says the producer Antony Perumbavoor. The climax fight was shot in Binny mills, Chennai. Mohanlal was slightly injured with an air gun during the climax shoot.

== Release ==
Ali Bhai was released on 15 August 2007 on Indian Independence day. Central Pictures distributed the film in Kerala. It made a new record in Malayalam releasing over 80 screens in Kerala. No Malayalam film has ever released in so many screens at that time. Pyramid Saimira Theatres Ltd. (PSTL) the distribution division of Chennai-based multinational entertainment company Pyramid Saimira, one of the world's fastest-growing entertainment groups, distributed the film outside Kerala. The film was released simultaneously in Mumbai, Chennai, Delhi and Bangalore.

== Soundtrack ==
Ali Bhai

Soundtrack album by Alex Paul
- Released: 1 January 2006
- Recorded: 2005
- Genre: Film soundtrack
- Length: 35:57
- Language: Malayalam
- Label: Mc Audios
- Producer: Antony Perumbavoor

Alex Paul chronology
Hallo (2007)	Ali Bhai (2006)	Kichamani MBA (2007)

The film's soundtrack contains 8 songs composed by Alex Paul, with lyrics written by Gireesh Puthenchery.

Track list
No.	Title	Singer(s)	Length
1.	"Aadimekha"	M. G. Sreekumar	4:55
2.	"Karik Karik"	Andriya	4:12
3.	"Arabikadalin"	M. G. Sreekumar	4:56
4.	"Punchirikkana"	M. G. Sreekumar, Manjari, Liji Francis	4:30
5.	"Pinchu Kidaangale"	Liji Francis	5:04
6.	"Kainiraye"	Manjari	4:43
7.	"Neelamizhi"	G. Venugopal, Jyotsna, Vidhu Prathap	4:28
8.	"Makaale Makkale"	M. G. Sreekumar	4:29
Total length:			35:57
