= Machan Varghese =

Indian actor (1960–2011)

- Born: M. L. Varghese; 1960; Elamakkara, Kochi, Kerala, India
- Died: 3 February 2011 (aged 50); Kozhikode, Kerala, India
- Occupations: Actor; mimicry artist
- Years active: 1993–2010
- Spouse: Elsi
- Children: 2

M. L. Varghese, (1960 – 3 February 2011) popularly known by stage name Machan Varghese, was a Malayalam film actor and mimicry artist. He started his career as a mimicry artist in Kalabhavan (house of arts) and debuted as an actor through Kabooliwala. Thereafter he played many notable roles in Malayalam films, mainly as a comedian. His association with Siddique-Lal, Rafi-Mecartin and Lal Jose are particularly noted. Within a career of nearly two decades, he acted in over 100 films. Varghese died on 3 February 2011 in Kozhikode of cancer. He was aged 50.

== Education and Family ==
M. L. Varghese (Machan) completed his high school education in 1970's from St. Albert's High School, Ernakulam. He was married to Elsy. The couple have a son Robin Varghese and a daughter Rincy.

== Filmography ==
Year	Title	Role	Notes
1989	Swantham Ennu Karuthi		
1993	Pravachakan		
1994	Kabooliwala		
1994	Moonnam Loka Pattalam	Earupadakkam	
1995	Mannar Mathai Speaking		
1995	Puthukkottayile Puthumanavalan	Kaleri Velunni	
1995	Hijack		
1996	The Porter		
1996	Man of the Match		
1996	Padanayakan		
1996	Hitler		
1997	Manthra Mothiram	Vakkachan	
1997	Kilikurissiyile Kudumba Mela	Kochappi	
1997	Newspaper Boy	Pakki	
1997	Moonnu Kodiyum 300 Pavanum	Elias	
1997	Siamese Irattakal	Sujathan	
1997	Mayaponman	Vasu's assistant	
1997	Gajaraja Manthram	Valsan	
1997	Ikkareyanente Manasam	Pokker	
1997	Swantham Makalkku Snehapoorvam		
1997	Anjarakalyanam	Raghavan Nair	
1997	Kalyana Pittennu		
1997	Adukkala Rahasyam Angaadi Paattu	Chandikunju	
1998	Chenapparampile Aanakkaaryam		
1998	Achaammakkuttiyude Achaayan		
1998	Sooryavanam		
1998	Thattakam		
1998	Punjabi House	Lawrence	
1999	Auto Brothers		
1999	Friends	Kunjappan	
1999	Jananayakan	Muniyappan	
1999	Vazhunnor	Cleetus	
2000	Mera Naam Joker	D'cruz	
2000	Ee Mazha Thenmazha		
2000	Kaathara		
2000	Thenkasipattanam	Karavettan	
2001	Chitrathoonukal		
2001	Rajapattam		
2001	Uthaman	Manikandan	
2001	Ee Parakkum Thalika	Moosa	
2001	Pranayakalathu		
2002	Chirikudukka	Thulasidharan	
2002	Savithriyude Aranjanam	Moythu	
2002	Akhila	Ayappan	
2002	Kaashillatheyum Jeevikkam		
2002	www.anukudumbam.com		
2002	Mazhathullikilukkam	Kuriakose	
2002	Malayali Mamanu Vanakkam	Chinnaiya	
2002	Meesha Madhavan	Lineman Lonappan	
2003	C.I.D. Moosa	Sebastian	
2003	Meerayude Dukhavum Muthuvinte Swapnavum	Kanaran	
2003	Hariharan Pilla Happy Aanu		
2003	Swantham Malavika	Keshavan	
2003	Sahodaran Sahadevan	Kuttappan	
2003	Chakram	Maniyannan	
2003	Sadanandante Samayam	Insurance agent Joseph	
2003	Thilakkam	Kunjavara	
2003	Pattalam	Pushkaran	
2004	Vamanapuram Bus Route	Velayudhan	
2004	Aparichithan	Watchman Bhaskaran	
2004	Shambu		
2004	Thalamelam	D'cruz	
2004	Kusruthi	Pick Pocketer	
2004	Jalolsavam	Kaali Thankan/Thankappan	
2004	Rasikan	Velu Annan	
2004	Chathikkatha Chanthu	Salim	
2004	Greetings	Peethambaran	
2005	Isra		
2005	Thommanum Makkalum	Raghu	
2005	Kalyanakurimanam		
2006	Aanachandam	Blade Vasu	
2006	Pachakuthira		
2007	Changathipoocha	Palisa Thomas	
2007	Inspector Garud	Kunjunni	
2007	Anamika		
2007	Black Cat		
2008	Mayakazhcha	Vikraman	
2008	Kovalam		
2008	Crazy Gopalan	Chandrappan	
2008	Jubilee	Shake	
2009	Changathikoottam	Markose	
2009	Hailesa		
2009	Kancheepurathe Kalyanam	Postman Velayudhan	
2009	Sanmanasullavan Appukuttan		
2009	Duplicate	Susheelan	
2009	Paribhavam		
2010	Best of Luck	Amminikuttan	
2010	Bombay Mittayi		
2010	Canvas		
2010	Thaskara Lahala		
2010	Cheriya Kallanum Valiya Policeum		
2010	Njan Sanchari		
2010	Paappi Appacha		
2010	Kadaksham		
2010	Nizhal		
2011	Maharaja Talkies		
2012	Orange	Allavuddin	Posthumously released

== Television ==
- Kadamattathu Kathanar (Asianet)
