= Jayakrishnan =

Indian actor (born 1970)

- Born: 11 April 1974 (age 52); Kottayam, Kerala, India
- Education: NSS Hindu College, Changanassery
- Occupations: Actor, television presenter
- Years active: 1997–present

Jayakrishnan (born 11 April 1974) is an Indian film and television actor known for his work in the Malayalam industry.

He was introduced as an actor by cinematographer and director Sunny Joseph with the serial Ninavukal Novukal in 1997. He has performed various roles throughout his career.

Jayakrishnan has also starred in other regional industries, including Telugu and Tamil. He briefly worked as a television presenter as the host of Top 5 Movies for Surya TV. Some of his notable serials are Thaali, Mazhayariyaathe, Kavyanjaly, Kasthuri (Tamil), and Abirami (Tamil).

== Early life ==
Jayakrishnan was born on 11 April 1974 in a Hindu Nair family in Kuzhimattom, Kottayam to P.N Narayanan Kutty and the late Sreedevi. His father is a retired school teacher as well as a pranic healer. He has a sister named Jyothi, and sculpture artist K.S. Radhakrishnan is his cousin brother who took to painting inspired by Jayakrishnan's father.

Jayakrishnan received his school education at NSS High School, Kuzhimattom, where his father was an arts teacher. He graduated from NSS Hindu College, Changanassery. He developed a passion for acting from the theater performance arts club in his hometown; later he started out giving narrations for documentaries and made his acting debut on television in the serial Ninavukal Novukal by cinematographer and director Sunny Joseph.

== Career ==
Jayakrishnan's character in the serial Sooryakanthi (1998) gave him a break in the entertainment industry. He worked with production companies including Balaji Telefilms, Seven Arts, and Manorama Vision. Jayakrishnan semi-retired from acting in serials after getting supporting roles from movies and concentrated on his business interests and social work. He has had supporting roles in films such as Irupathiyonnaam Noottaandu, Mask, Pulimurugan, Abrahaminte Santhathikal, Kanal, Red Wine, Simhasanam, How Old Are You?, Karmayodha, Parunthu, Naatturajavu, and Roudram.

== Personal life ==
Jayakrishnan married Priya in 2000, who holds a post graduate degree in library science and is a classical dancer. They have one son, Devanarayan, who was born in 2001. The couple lived separately for one year until 2011 when they filed for divorce by mutual consent.

== Filmography ==
=== Film ===
Year	Title	Role	Notes
1994	Habelinte Vayalukal		
2000	Swayamvara Panthal	Nanthagopal	
2000	The Warrant	Jyothir Ghosh	
2000	Oru Cheru Punchiri	Bhaskaran	
2001	Nagaravadhu	Harshan	
2002	Puthooramputhri Unniyarcha	Kunjiraman	
2003	Soudamini		
2004	Naatturajavu	Doctor	
2007	Paranju Theeratha Visheshangal	Mohan	
2008	Mayakazhcha		
2008	Roudram	CM's son	
2008	Shakespeare M.A. Malayalam	Karthik Mohan	
2008	Gulmohar	Unnikrishnan	
2008	Parunthu	CI	
2009	Colours		
2010	Oru Naal Varum	Advocate	
2011	Happy Durbar		
2011	Bangkok Summer	Madhavan	
2012	The King & the Commissioner	Sateesh Chandran	
2012	Simhasanam	Krishnan Unni	
2012	Manthrikan	Manappilli Bhattahiri	
2012	Grihanathan	Doctor	
2012	Oru Kudumba Chithram		
2012	Karmayodha	Mohammed Riyaz IAS	
2012	Chuzhali Kaattu	JP	
2012	Banking Hours 10 to 4	Hari	
2012	Vaadhyar	Balagopalan IAS	
2012	101 Weddings	Scaria	
2012	Ardhanaari	Balu Menon	
2013	Up & Down: Mukalil Oralundu	Surendran	
2013	Oru Yathrayil		
2013	Red Wine	Venugopal S	
2013	Radio	Jayan	
2014	Parayan Baaki Vechathu		
2014	Garbhasreeman	'Blade' Antony Isaac	
2014	Mylanchi Monchulla Veedu	CI	
2014	How Old Are You?	Mohan (District Collector)	
2015	Jamna Pyari	Officers	
2015	Just Married		
2015	Acha Din	Doctor	
2015	Kanal	Police Officer	
2015	Sir C. P.	Mathew	
2015	Kumbasaram		
2016	Daffedar	Viswanathan	
2016	Paavada	Kallu Varkki, Joy's father	
2016	Pulimurugan	Police officer, Raghurajan	
2017	Kadam Katha		
2017	Kuppivala		
2017	Achayans	SI	
2017	1971: Beyond Borders	Commando Anand	
2017	Love Bonda		
2017	Chembarathipoo		
2017	Fukri	Raghunath	
2018	Thenkasi Kattu		
2018	Abrahaminte Santhathikal	Joseph	
2019	Irupathiyonnaam Noottaandu	SI Sebastian Paul	
2019	Theerumanam	Vishwan	
2019	Mask	George	
2019	Orma	Sibi	
2020	Safe	Jashik	
2020	Mullapoo Viplavam		
2020	Chila NewGen Nattuvisheshangal		
2021	One	MLA Tom Mukkadan	
2021	Mission C		
2021	Kolaambi	Jacob George	
2021	Vidhi: The Verdict		
2021	Oru Thathvika Avalokanam	Padmakumar	
2022	Panthrand (Twelve)		
2022	Laughing Budha		
2022	Pathaam Valavu		
2022	CBI 5: The Brain	CI Josemon	
2022	Bharatha Circus	Hari	
2023	Otta		
2024	Iyer in Arabia		
2024	Kudumbasthreeyum Kunjadum		
2024	Ezhuthola		
2024	Chithini		
TBA	Anand Sreebala †	TBA	

== Television Serials ==
Partial list

Year	Serial	Character	Language	Channel
1999	Ninavukal Novukal	Balu	Malayalam	DD Malayalam
2002	Anna	Hari	Malayalam	DD Malayalam
2000	Detective Anand	Detective Anand	Malayalam	DD Malayalam
2000	Thali	Keshu	Malayalam	Surya TV
2001	Valayam	SP Jayadevan IPS	Malayalam	DD Malayalam
2002	Yudham	Ravi	Malayalam	DD Malayalam
2003	Thulasidalam		Malayalam	Surya TV
2003	Sthree Oru Santhwanam		Malayalam	Asianet
2006	Swarnamayooram		Malayalam	Asianet
2006	Sindoorarekha		Malayalam	Asianet
2006	Kavyaanjali	Arun	Malayalam	Surya TV
2006-2008	Kasthuri (TV series)	Ram	Tamil	Sun TV
2007	Suryakanthi	Dathan	Malayalam	Surya TV
2007	Brahmamudi		Telugu	Gemini TV
2008	Swami Ayyappan		Malayalam	Asianet
2008	Namma Kudumbam		Tamil	Sun TV
2008	Mazhayariyathe		Malayalam	Surya TV
2009	Vadakakku oru Hridayam	Sadasivan Pillai	Malayalam	Amrita TV
2011	Abirami (TV series)		Tamil	Kalaignar TV
2012	Amma	Jagan	Malayalam	Asianet
2012	Manasaveena		Malayalam	Mazhavil Manorama
2018	CBI Diary	CBI DySP Sharafudheen	Malayalam	Mazhavil Manorama
2024-2025	Premam	Vasudevan	Malayalam	Pocket FM
