= T. A. Shahid =

Indian screenwriter

T A Shahid
- Born: 25 May 1972
- Died: 28 September 2012 (aged 40)
- Citizenship: India
- Occupations: Screenwriter, dialogues
- Years active: 2003–2012
- Notable work: Rajamanikyam, Balettan
- Spouse: Sheeja
- Children: Akhila Shahid, Alida Shahid
- Parent(s): T. A. Bappu; Vazhayil Khadeeja
- Relatives: T. A. Razzaq (brother)

T A Shahid (25 May 1972 – 28 September 2012) was a scriptwriter in the Malayalam film industry. He was the younger brother of T. A. Razzaq, another popular screenwriter in Malayalam films.

He died of cirrhosis aged 41 on 28 September 2012 in a private hospital in Kozhikode where he had been undergoing treatment for some time.

== Filmography ==
No.	Film	Director
1	Balettan (2003)	V. M. Vinu
2	Natturajavu (2004)	Shaji Kailas
3	Malsaram (2004)	Anil C Menon
4	Maampazhakkaalam (2004)	Joshiy
5	Ben Johnson (2005)	Anil C Menon
6	Rajamanikyam (2005)	Anwar Rasheed
7	Pachakuthira (2006)	Kamal
8	Khaki (2007)	Bibin Prabhakar
9	Alibhai (2007)	Shaji Kailas
10	Thanthonni (2010)	George Varghese
11	MLA Mani: Patham Classum Gusthiyum (2012)	Sreejith Paleri
