= Indraja =

Indian actress

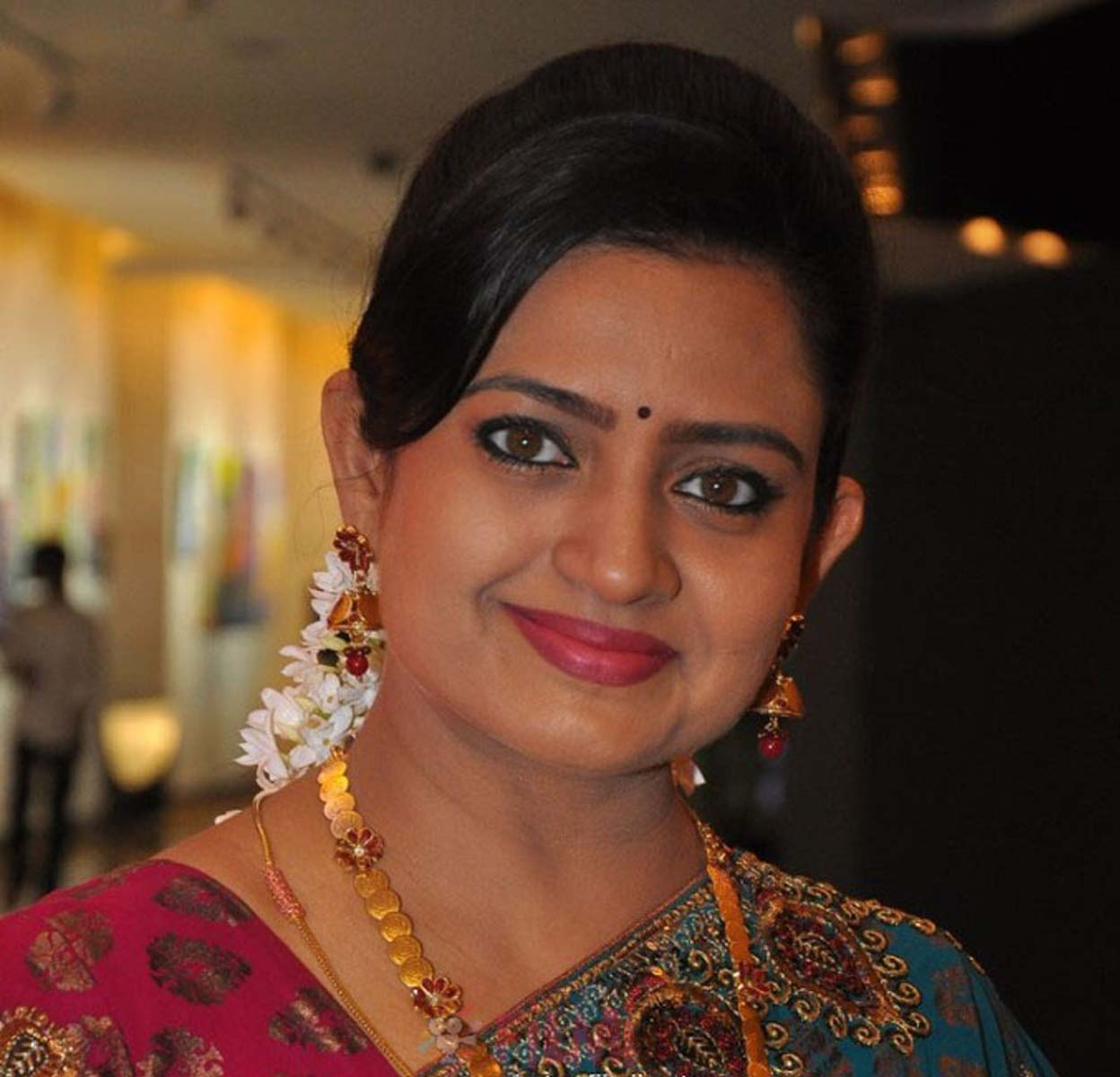
- Indraja in 2020
- Born: Rajathi; Chennai, Tamil Nadu, India
- Occupations: Actress; model
- Years active: 1994 – 2007; 2014 – present
- Spouse: Mohammed Absar
- Children: 1

Rajathi, better known by her stage name Indraja, is an Indian actress who works in Tamil, Malayalam and Telugu films, in addition to television shows.

== Early life ==
Indraja was born as Rajathi in a Telugu Brahmin family in Chennai. She is the eldest of three sisters and comes from a Carnatic music family. A trained classical singer and dancer, she learned Kuchipudi dance form Madhavapeddi Murthy. She was preparing to be a journalist.

== Career ==
Indraja was cast as a child actress in Rajinikanth-starrer Uzhaippali movie. With Jantar Mantar, her first movie as a grown-up, she adopted the name of her character in that movie, 'Indraja' as her stage name. Later, S. V. Krishna Reddy's Yamaleela catapulted her to instant stardom. The film ran for over a year. She acted in Thadayam and Rajavin Parvaiyile but she was not able to make much headway in Tamil movies, as both movies failed to make an impact at the box office.

She played the female lead roles in a number of successful Malayalam films, such as the action drama Ustaad alongside Mohanlal, crime thriller F.I.R alongside Suresh Gopi both released in 1999, the 2003 romantic comedy-drama Chronic Bachelor alongside Mammootty, 2004 comedy drama Mayilattam opposite Jayaram and 2005 action thriller Ben Johnson alongside Kalabhavan Mani which are some of her most notable Malayalam films. After a hiatus post her marriage, she has returned to movies with some notable roles in several Telugu movies.

== Personal life ==
Indraja is married to actor and businessman Mohammed Absar who has acted in many television serials. The couple has a daughter named Sara.

== Filmography ==
=== Films ===
Year	Title	Role	Language	Notes
1993	Uzhaippali	Young Tamilarasan's sister	Tamil	credited as Baby Aishwarya
1993	Purusha Lakshanam	Film actress	Tamil	
1994	Hello Brother	Herself	Telugu	Special appearance in the song "Kannepetta Ro"
1994	Rickshaw Rudraiah		Telugu	
1994	Jantar Mantar	Indraja	Telugu	
1994	Yamaleela	Lily	Telugu	
1994	Amaidhi Padai	Thayamma's friend	Tamil	
1995	Sogasu Chooda Tharamaa	Neelu (Neelima Devi)	Telugu	Nominated-Filmfare Award for Best Actress – Telugu
1995	Amma Donga	Mohana / Kalyani	Telugu	
1995	Rajavin Parvaiyile	Gowri	Tamil	
1995	Balaraju Bangaru Pellam	Nagamani	Telugu	
1995	Aasthi Mooredu Asha Baaredu	Dancer	Telugu	
1995	Vaddu Bava Thappu	Priya	Telugu	
1995	Server Sundaramgari Abbayi	Heroine	Telugu	
1995	Errodu	Seetalu	Telugu	
1995	Love Game	Indu	Telugu	
1995	Subhamasthu	Saroja	Telugu	
1995	Bhartha Simham	Special appearance	Telugu	
1995	Vajram		Telugu	
1995	Miss 420		Telugu	
1996	Mummy Mee Aayanochadu	Sharada	Telugu	
1996	Sampradhayam	Geetha	Telugu	
1996	Pittala Dora	Nikki	Telugu	
1996	Once More	Kalyani	Telugu	
1996	Nalla Poosalu	Revathi	Telugu	
1996	Jagadeka Veerudu	Labbu	Telugu	
1996	Bobbili Bolludu	Rathani	Telugu	
1997	Thadayam	Devi	Tamil	
1997	Oka Chinna Maata	Geeta	Telugu	
1997	Jai Bajarangabhali	Ramya	Telugu	
1997	Chilakkottudu	Indraja	Telugu	
1997	Peddannayya	Sravani	Telugu	
1997	Chinnabbayi	Lalitha	Telugu	Cameo appearance
1997	Illalu		Telugu	
1998	Velai	Charulatha	Tamil	
1998	Kalavari Chellelu Kanaka Maha Lakshmi	Vijaya	Telugu	
1998	O Panaipothundi Babu		Telugu	
1998	Gadibidi Krishna	Seeta	Kannada	
1999	Surya Puthrika	Gayathri	Telugu	
1999	The Godman	Mumthas	Malayalam	
1999	Ustaad	Kshama	Malayalam	
1999	Independence	Sindu	Malayalam	
1999	F.I.R	Laila	Malayalam	
1999	Pichodi Chetilo Raayi	Indu	Telugu	
1999	Chinni Chinni Aasa	Aasa	Telugu	
1999	Coolie Raja	Suma	Kannada	
1999	The Killer	Sita	Kannada	
1999	Unnaruge Naan Irundhal	Dancer	Tamil	
1999	Prathyartha		Kannada	
1999	Avale Nanna Hudugi		Kannada	
1999	Telangana		Telugu	
2000	Sammakka Sarakka	Guest role	Telugu	
2000	Sundara Purusha	Heroine Irvasi	Kannada	
2000	Khadga	Gayathri	Kannada	
2000	Sradha	Sudha	Malayalam	
2000	Mundaithe Oora Habba		Kannada	
2001	Unnathangalil	Helen	Malayalam	
2002	Krishna Gopalakrishna	Bhama	Malayalam	
2003	Cheri	Arundhati	Malayalam	
2003	Achante Kochumol	Daisy	Malayalam	
2003	Chronic Bachelor	Bhavani Rajasekharan	Malayalam	
2003	War and Love	Capt. Hema Varma	Malayalam	
2003	Relax	Chitra	Malayalam	
2004	Thalamelam	Ammukutty	Malayalam	
2004	Agninakshathram	Ammu	Malayalam	
2004	Engal Anna	Bhavani	Tamil	
2004	Mayilattam	Meenakshi	Malayalam	
2005	Lokanathan IAS		Malayalam	
2005	Ben Johnson	Gouri	Malayalam	
2006	Highway Police	Ranjini	Malayalam	
2006	Narakasuran	Neena Viswanathan	Malayalam	
2007	Indrajith	Shahina	Malayalam	
2014	Dikkulu Choodaku Ramayya	Bhavani	Telugu	
2015	Budugu	Dr. Geetha Reddy	Telugu	
2015	Lion	CBI Deputy Chief Indrani	Telugu	
2017	Sathamanam Bhavati	Jhansi	Telugu	
2017	Samanthakamani	Bhanumati	Telugu	
2018	Agnyaathavaasi	Krishnaveni Bhargav	Telugu	
2018	Happy Wedding	Neeraja	Telugu	
2019	Akkadokkannadu	Mamatha	Telugu	
2019	Software Sudheer	Chandu's mother	Telugu	
2021	Alludu Adhurs	Sreenu's mother	Telugu	
2021	Stand Up Rahul	Rahul's mother	Telugu	
2022	Anantham	Maragatham	Tamil	
2022	Macherla Niyojakavargam	Siddhu's mother	Telugu	
2022	12C	Asha Pai	Malayalam	
2022	Breaking News		Tamil	
2022	It's My Life		Telugu	
2023	Ugram	Dr. Manasa	Telugu	
2024	Razakar	Chakali Ailamma	Telugu	
2024	Prathinidhi 2		Telugu	
2024	Maruthi Nagar Subramanyam	Kala Rani	Telugu	
2025	Katha Kamamishu	Kalpana	Telugu	
2025	Thala		Telugu	
2025	14 Days Girlfriend Intlo	Harika		

=== Television ===
Title	Network	Language	Notes
Sundarakanda	Gemini TV	Telugu	Pavithra
Paasam	Sun TV	Tamil	Janaki
Aan Paavam	Sun TV	Tamil	
Bhairavi Aavigalukku Priyamanaval	Sun TV	Tamil	Special appearance
Valli	Sun TV	Tamil	Madhumitha Subbu
Premanuragam - Naana		Telugu	
Get Ready	ETV	Telugu	
Wow 2	ETV	Telugu	
Cash	ETV	Telugu	
Jabardasth	ETV	Telugu	Judge from 1 April 2021 – 20 May 2021
Sridevi Drama Company	ETV	Telugu	
Thaggedele	ETV	Telugu	
Alitho Sardaga	ETV	Telugu	
Pellam Vaddu Party Muddu	ETV	Telugu	
JB Junction	ETV	Malayalam	Kairali TV
Comedy Super Nite	Flowers	Malayalam	
Thaka Dhimi Thaka Janu	Jaya TV	Tamil	
Musical wife grand finale	Flowers	Malayalam	
Star Magic 2024	Flowers TV	Malayalam	
