= Rajamanikyam =

- Promotional poster
- Directed by: Anwar Rasheed
- Written by: T. A. Shahid
- Produced by: Valiyaveettil Siraj
- Starring: Mammootty; Rahman; Manoj K. Jayan; Ranjith; Bheeman Raghu
- Cinematography: Sanjeev Shankar
- Edited by: Ranjan Abraham
- Music by: Alex Paul
- Production company: Valiyaveettil Movie International
- Distributed by: Valiyaveettil Release & PJ Entertainments
- Release date: 1 November 2005; (India)
- Running time: 126 minutes
- Country: India
- Budget: ₹2.30 crore
- Box office: ₹25 crore

Rajamanikyam is a 2005 Indian Malayalam-language masala film directed by Anwar Rasheed in his directoral debut and written by T. A. Shahid. It stars Mammootty as the titular businessman, along with Rahman, Manoj K Jayan, Ranjith, Salim Kumar, Sai Kumar, Bheeman Raghu, Sindhu Menon, Padmapriya and Cochin Haneefa in supporting roles. The music is composed by Alex Paul. It tells the story of Rajamanikyam aka Bellary Raja (Mammootty), a Karnataka-based buffalo businessman who tries to unite his warring siblings.

The film was released on 1 November during Diwali, and was dubbed and released in Tamil with the same name in 2007. It was the highest grossing Malayalam movie in 2005.

The film was remade in Kannada in 2009 as Bellary Naga.

== Plot ==
In a village in Southern Kerala bordering Tamil Nadu lives a wealthy and respectful businessman named Raja Rathnam Pillai. Following the demise of his first wife, he marries Muthu Lakshmi so that Selvam, the child from his first marriage will not grow up without the love and care of a mother. Unknown to him, Muthu Lakshmi already has a son, whom she calls Muthu.

The night of the wedding, Muthu knocks at the door of Raja Rathnam, demanding that he be shown his mother. Once Raja Rathnam realises the truth, he takes Muthu into his care, giving him love, affection and a new name, "Rajamanikyam". Muthu returns the favour duly, as when Selvam ends up killing one of the children of their village, he takes up the blame and leaves the village, after getting a hit on his left eye.

Several years later, Raja Rathnam's two grown-up children, Selvam and Rani, quarrel for their father's wealth. Selvam, aided by his childhood buddy Simon Nadar also notches up a plot to frame his own father in a murder case. Raja Rathnam is implicated in a sensitive political murder. As a result, Raja Rathnam is arrested and remanded. While taking Rathnam to the prison from the premises of the court, a wide scale altercation erupts - between Rathnam's supporters and the sycophants of the slain politician. Amidst the chaos, a huge stone is pelted at Raja Rathnam - severely injuring him. (The stone is pelted by the actual assailant). Witnessing the riots, Raja Rathnam dies of a heart attack - sitting inside the police van - while being taken to the prison. After his death, the two siblings are summoned by the family lawyer to read out the provisions of Raja Rathnam's will. But to their surprise, they find that control of all the assets of their father have been transferred to a Bellary based cattle dealer and businessman named Bellary Raja. They fail to recognize that Bellary Raja is none other than Rajamanikyam.

Selvam and Rani tries to thwart Manikyam in order to regain control of their father's wealth. But Manikyam never falls for any of their attempts and he uses his younger brother and manager Raju to stabilize the assets of his stepfather and prevents it from getting into the hands of his siblings, thereby preserving it. Manikyam effectively uses the help of his thug friends to restore order in the establishment. Manikyam's identity is revealed by himself at a crucial juncture and revelation stuns the entire family. Simon and Selvam sends a goon to kill Bellary from his blind side. However, Bellary thwarts the attempt, lightly wounding him.

Differences emerge between Selvam and Simon regarding a financial liability. Simon betrays Selvam him and he is held captive by a boorish Tamil moneylender Perumal - who demands the repayment for the release of Selvam. Rani - unaware of the latter developments - blames Manikyam in order to deny them their claim over their father's wealth. Manikyam comes to the rescue and pays the required amount of money to release Selvam. He emotionally narrates his hardships and love for his siblings - stirring the emotions of his mother and siblings. Feeling deeply disappointed - on being unable to fulfill his father's wish to unite their family, Manikyam prepares to leave for Bellary.

At that night Selvam, being absolutely drunk and weeping comes to Manikyam's house and apologizes for all his past deeds and embraces him - burying all differences. He asks Manikyam not to leave them. Manikyam is deeply moved and laments that, Raja Rathnam was unfortunate as he 'left early' (An untimely death) and he could not witness the conciliation. Varghese, a close confidant and trusted ally of Raja Rathnam, reveals that he was rather 'packed off' (A murder) - resulting in the narration of the deceit and Manikyam and acolytes go in search for the actual assailant. When the real culprit is caught, he reveals the main conspirator was Simon. Selvam and Simon gets into an argument-turned-fight. Selvam gets beaten badly by Simon and his goons was about to be killed. However, Manikyam, Raju and their henchman Varkey came to rescue Selvam and fight off Simon and his henchmen.

Manikyam releases a bull towards Simon and kills him for killing Raja Rathnam and trying to destroy his family. He reunites with Selvam and takes him home. The movie ends when Rajamanikyam, who is half-blind, says, "Now I have both eyes", signifying Raju and Selvam.

== Cast ==
- Mammootty as Rajamanikyam aka Bellary Raja, Raja Rathnam Pillai's eldest adopted son and a buffalo businessman in Bellary
  - Ashwin C. Menon as young Rajamanikyam (Muthu)
- Rahman as Raju, Manikyam's younger brother and educated manager.
- Manoj K. Jayan as Rajaselvam, Raja Rathnam Pillai's son, Manikyam's and Raju's younger brother
- Ranjith as Simon Nadar, Rajaselvam's friend and partner (voice over by Shobi Thilakan)
- Sai Kumar as Raja Rathnam Pillai, Selvam's, Rani's father and Manikyam's and Raju's adopted father and a wealthy businessman.
- Bheeman Raghu as Quintal Varkey, Manikyam's friend and henchmen
- Salim Kumar as Dasappan
- Cochin Haneefa as Varghese, Raja Ratnam's friend
- Padmapriya Janakiraman as Malli / Chellakkili, a flower seller and Bellari Raja's love interest
- Sindhu Menon as Rani Rathnam, Selvam's Stepsister & Manikyam's, Raju's sister
- Chitra Shenoy as Muthulakshmi Ammal, Rajarathnam's second wife, Selvam 's mother and Rani's step mother and Manikyam's and Raju's mother
- Suresh Krishna as Ramesh, Rani Ratnam's husband, Manikyam's and Raju's brother-in-law.
- Baburaj as Tamilnadu CI Vikraman
- Maniyanpilla Raju as Advocate Shivadaas Menon
- T. P. Madhavan as College Principal
- Kadhal Dhandapani as Perumal
- Vijay Menon as Adv. Lal Cherian, an advocate arranged by Nadar.
- Abu Salim as Goonda sent by Raja Selvam to kill Manikyam.
- Santhosh Jogi as Goonda, an assassin, sent by Simon Nadar to trap Raja Ratnam Pillai and who throws a stone at him at court
- Kalabhavan Shajohn as Finance Manager, spy of Raja Selvam.
- Nivia Rebin as Kanakambaram, Malli's younger sister
- Srilatha as Church child

Narayanankutty and Pradeep Kottayam appear as board members of Rajarathnam group. Biju Sopanam appears in an uncredited role as an aide to the assassin, played by Santosh Jogi.

=== Family tree of Rajarathnam Family ===
	{{{ML}}}		Raja Rathnam		Janakiyammal
Raja Manikyam	{{{RMSH}}}	Rani Rathnam		Raja Selvam

== Production ==
Actor Suraj Venjaramoodu was roped in to help Mammootty get the hang of the slang spoken in the border areas of Thiruvananthapuram. Mammootty was highly praised for rendering the slang efficiently and that contributed greatly to it becoming a mega mass film. Rajamanikyam was completed in Pollachi in a record time of 55 days.

== Reception ==
Sreenath Nair of the Deccan Herald wrote, "Mammooty does justice to his superstar tag and his portrayal of Bellary Raja eclipses the rest of the cast - Cochin Haneefa, Sai Kumar, Manoj K Jayan, etc. Anwar Rasheed's debut is not bad but more care on delineation, music and cinematography would have helped the Bellary Raja."

== Box office ==
The film was released to high expectations, with Valiyaveethil Films collecting ₹2 crore from theatre advances for the film. It was released on 4 November 2005 in 45 theatres in Kerala, on the occasion of Ramzan, along with Ananthabhadram and Boyy Friennd. The film was a commercial success and became the highest grossing Malayalam film at that time. The film ran for more than 140 days in the theaters. It was the highest grossing Malayalam movie of the year. It is the first Malayalam film to have ₹2 crore center gross from Ernakulam. The film completed its 100 days at Kavitha, Ernakulam, from where it got a record distributors' share of Rs. 98 lakhs. The film also ran for 286 days in Thiruvananthapuram Kripa theatre. The film collected ₹ 25 crore from Kerala box office in its final run.

== Legacy ==
The character of Bellary Raja attained cult status in Kerala. The dialogues of the film were referred to in many other films most noteworthy being in Malayalam film Premam (during the second intro of Nivin Pauly). Moreover, the costumes of Mammootty in the film went onto become a trend setter in Kerala.
