= Arun Krishnan =

Indian writer based in New York City

Arun Krishnan is an Indian writer based in New York City.

He is the author of The Loudest Firecracker, published by Tranquebar Press, a coming of age story set against the backdrop of communal tensions in urban India. He is also the host of the Learn Hindi from Bollywood Movies. India Style. podcast, the number one rated Indian podcast on iTunes.
