= Lokanathan IAS =

- Directed by: Anil
- Written by: Biju Vattappara
- Produced by: M. Mani
- Starring: Kalabhavan Mani; Gayatri Jayaraman; Renjith; Salim Kumar; Harisree Ashokan; Nishanth Sagar; Anil Murali; Kalashala Babu; KPAC Lalitha; Suja Karthika; Ponnamma Babu; Ambika Mohan; Sonika
- Cinematography: Anandakuttan
- Edited by: P.C. Mohanan
- Music by: M. Jayachandran (songs); Rajamani (score); Kaithapram Damodaran Namboothiri (lyrics)
- Distributed by: Aroma Films
- Release date: 16 September 2005
- Running time: 102 minutes
- Country: India
- Language: Malayalam

Lokanathan IAS is a 2005 Indian Malayalam language action drama film starring Kalabhavan Mani in the lead role. It was released on 16 September 2005.

== Plot ==
Lokanathan, who witnessed his father's murder at a young age, grows up to become an auto-rickshaw diver, the hero of his slum. His father's murderer, a politician called Brahmanandan, becomes a minister causing harm to the people who elected him. Lokanathan, by the advice of others becomes an IAS officer.

Brahmanandan introduces his niece Durga, an IPS officer, to fight Lokanathan. Soon, Lokanathan is thrown out from his position. He is fought by the goons of Brahmanandan. But he is saved by Durga, who turns a new leaf and becomes his helper. Later, Lokanathan wins the hearts of many people and becomes an MLA. Brahmanandan, who notes Durga's change, kidnaps and kills Lokanathan's sister in front of him. The film ends with Lokanathan smashing the goons of Brahmanandan, and finally killing him.

== Cast ==
- Kalabhavan Mani as Lokanathan IAS
- Ranjith as Brahmanandan
- Harisree Ashokan as Santhosh
- Gayatri Jayaraman as City Police Commissioner Durga IPS, Brahmanandan's niece
- Salim Kumar as Rajappan, Lokanathan's brother-in-law
- K. P. A. C. Lalitha as Lokanathan's mother
- Suja Karthika as Lokanathan's sister
- Kalasala Babu as Koya / Koyakka
- T. G. Ravi as Comrade Pappan, Lokanathan's Father
- Vishnu Prasad as Krishnan, Divakaran's Son
- Sadiq as Minister Divakaran
- Baburaj as CI Unnithan
- Anil Murali as Anwar, Lokanathan's friend and Koya's nephew
- Nishanth Sagar as Charlie, Lokanathan's friend
- V. K. Sreeraman as Hassan Haji
- Kozhikode Narayanan Nair as Kurup
- Ponnamma Babu as Lokanathan's sister
- Kalabhavan Shajohn as Sub Inspector of Police Shekharan
- Ambika Mohan as Koya's wife
- Sonika as Koya's daughter
- Kollam Ajith as Goonda
- Vimal Raj as Goonda
