= Soumyam =

- Poster
- Directed by: Rajesh Nambiar
- Starring: Biju Menon; Devayani; Mukesh; Suja Karthika
- Music by: Kaithapram
- Release date: 4 March 2005
- Country: India
- Language: Malayalam

Soumyam is a 2005 Indian Malayalam-language film, directed by Rajesh Nambiar. The film stars Biju Menon, Devayani, Mukesh and Suja Karthika in lead roles. The film had music by Kaithapram.

== Cast ==
- Biju Menon
- Devayani
- Mukesh
- Suja Karthika
- Sanusha

== Accolades ==
- Kerala State Film Award for Best Child Artist - Sanusha (also for Kaazhcha)
