= Vesham =

- Directed by: V. M. Vinu
- Written by: T. A. Razzaq
- Produced by: Swargachithra Appachan
- Starring: Mammootty; Innocent; Sai Kumar; Indrajith; Mohini; Gopika
- Cinematography: Shaji Kumar
- Edited by: PC Mohanan
- Music by: S.A. Rajkumar
- Release date: 24 December 2004
- Country: India
- Language: Malayalam

Vesham is a 2004 Malayalam-language drama film directed by V. M. Vinu, produced by Swargachithra Appachan in which Mammootty is in the lead role. Innocent and Indrajith Sukumaran played other important roles.

== Plot ==
Appukuttan Menon, commonly known as Appu, is the eldest son of a traditional family and shoulders most of the responsibility for maintaining the household. Following difficulties faced by his family, Appu gives up his own education and personal ambitions and begins working to support his parents and siblings. He is particularly devoted to his younger brother, Hariprasad, known as Hari, and ensures that Hari receives opportunities that he himself was unable to have.

Through years of hard work, Appu becomes a successful businessman. Despite his financial success, he remains deeply attached to his family and uses much of his income to support his relatives and help people in need. His generosity and willingness to assist others sometimes create difficulties for him, but Appu continues to place the welfare of his family above his own interests.

Hari is sent abroad for higher education with Appu's financial support. Appu hopes that his younger brother will return and eventually take responsibility for the family and its business affairs. After completing his studies, Hari returns home with his wife. His experiences abroad have changed his outlook, and he approaches business and financial matters differently from Appu.

Differences gradually develop between the brothers. Hari believes that Appu's generosity and emotional approach to business are preventing the family from becoming more prosperous. He begins questioning Appu's decisions and attempts to introduce changes in the management of their business. Appu, however, continues to believe that maintaining relationships and helping others are more important than accumulating wealth. At the same time, Appu faces opposition from Sivan, an influential businessman who has a longstanding rivalry with him. Sivan attempts to weaken Appu financially and damage his reputation. He takes advantage of the disagreements within Appu's family and creates further problems for him.

The relationship between Appu and Hari deteriorates as misunderstandings and financial disputes increase. Despite being hurt by Hari's actions, Appu continues to protect and support his younger brother. Other members of the family also become involved in the conflict, placing further pressure on Appu.

The situation becomes more serious when a murder occurs and Hari becomes connected to the crime. The possibility of Hari being arrested and prosecuted threatens the future that Appu had spent years building for him. Determined to protect his younger brother, Appu takes responsibility for the murder and allows the authorities to believe that he committed the crime.

Appu's decision places his own freedom and reputation at risk. As the investigation continues, the circumstances surrounding the murder and the actions of those responsible for creating the conflict gradually come to light. Sivan's involvement in the problems faced by Appu and his family is exposed.

The conflict ultimately leads to a confrontation between Appu and Sivan. The truth about the events surrounding the murder is revealed, and the misunderstandings within Appu's family are resolved. Hari realizes the extent of the sacrifices Appu has made for him and understands his elder brother's devotion to the family.

The film concludes with the family recognizing Appu's sacrifices and the conflicts that divided them coming to an end. Appu's actions demonstrate his willingness to sacrifice his ambitions, reputation, and freedom for the welfare of his younger brother and family.

== Cast ==
- Mammootty as Appukuttan Menon
- Innocent as Pappan Menon
- Sai Kumar as Sivan
- Indrajith as Hariprasad Menon
- Mohini as Ashwathi, Appu's wife
- Gopika as Revathy, Hari's wife
- Vishunuprakash as Revathy's father
- Kozhikode Narayanan Nair
- Cochin Haneefa as Adv. Chithrabhanu
- Jagathy Sreekumar as Ganapathi
- Sindhu Menon as Veni
- T. P. Madhavan
- Riyaz Khan as Deepak
- Augustine as Poulose
- Ajay Jayaprakash as child actor
- Varsha as Appu's elder daughter
- V.M. Vinu as Man at the airport
- Keerthana Anil as Appu's younger daughter

== Soundtrack ==
The music for the film was composed by S. A. Rajkumar. Except for "Kelkkathoru Sangeetham", the film features songs reused from Rajkumar's previous compositions: "Oho Minnale" is based on "Aha Jumtaka" from the Kannada film Chandra Chakori and "Veshangal" is based on "Saamanthi Poovukkum" from the unreleased Tamil film Putham Puthu Poove.

All lyrics are written by Kaithapram.

No.	Title	Artist(s)	Length
1.	"Kelkkathoru Sangeetham"	Karthik, Sujatha Mohan
2.	"Oho Minnale"	K. S. Chithra
3.	"Veshangal"	K. J. Yesudas
4.	"Veshangal"	K. S. Chithra

== Release ==
The film received mixed response upon release. Sify wrote, "The story of Vesham is as old as hills and the narration is old fashioned and predictable".

== Awards ==
The film won three Asianet Film Awards in 2004.

- Best Actor – Mammootty
- Best Supporting Actor - Innocent
- Best Supporting Actress - Gopika
