= Balettan =

2003 Indian film

- VCD cover
- Directed by: V. M. Vinu
- Written by: T. A. Shahid
- Produced by: M. Mani
- Starring: Mohanlal; Devayani; Nedumudi Venu; Innocent; Harisree Ashokan; Jagathy Sreekumar; Riyaz Khan
- Cinematography: Anandakuttan
- Edited by: P. C. Mohanan
- Music by: M. Jayachandran (songs); C. Rajamani (score)
- Production company: Aroma Movie International
- Distributed by: Aroma Release
- Release date: 29 August 2003
- Country: India
- Language: Malayalam
- Budget: ₹1.75 crore (US$180,000)
- Box office: ₹14 crore (US$1.5 million)

Balettan is a 2003 Indian Malayalam-language family drama film directed by V. M. Vinu, written by T. A. Shahid, and produced by M. Mani. It stars Mohanlal in the title role, along with Devayani, Nedumudi Venu, Harisree Ashokan, Riyaz Khan, Innocent, and Jagathy Sreekumar. The film's songs were composed by M. Jayachandran, while the background score was provided by C. Rajamani. The film was released on 28 August 2003. Balettan was a blockbuster at the box office and the highest grossing Malayalam movie of the year and ran for more than 200 days in theatres. It won the Kerala Film Critics Association Awards for Best Popular Film. The film was remade in Telugu as Rajababu (2006).

== Plot ==
The film follows Balan, an ordinary family man who lives with his wife Radhika, their two children, his younger brother, younger sister, and his parents. His father, Gopalan, a retired postmaster, is a respected figure in the community. Although Balan struggles to balance his professional responsibilities with his enthusiasm for amateur theatre and his habit of helping others, he is well regarded in his village and is affectionately known as "Balettan."

Balan's generosity, involvement in community activities, and occasional carelessness eventually lead him into financial difficulties. He accumulates substantial debts and is falsely arrested on charges of cheating. Gopalan secures his release by using his pension savings for bail and urges Balan to become more responsible toward his family.

Shortly thereafter, Gopalan suffers a cardiac arrest and is hospitalised. Before his death, he confides to Balan that he had secretly married another woman and fathered a daughter, asking him to care for them without revealing the truth to the rest of the family or the villagers.

Following Gopalan's death, Balan attempts to support both families while keeping his father's secret. His frequent meetings with his half-sister lead his family to suspect that he is having an extramarital affair. At the same time, a man named Bhadran enters Balan's life and begins blackmailing him after learning of the secret, intending to exploit the situation for his own benefit. The remainder of the film follows Balan's efforts to overcome Bhadran's threats, protect his father's second family, and gain acceptance for them within the community.

== Cast ==
- Mohanlal as Athaniparambil Balachandran "Balan" Menon
- Devayani as Radhika, Balan's wife
- Nedumudi Venu as Gopalan Menon, Balan's father
- Sudha as Lekshmi, Balan's mother
- Sudheesh as A. Sudheendran Menon, Balan's younger brother
- Lakshana as Nithya, Balan's younger sister
- Riyaz Khan as Bhadran
- Jagathy Sreekumar as K. K. Pisharadi
- Harisree Ashokan as Manikandan
- Nithya Das as Devaki, Balan's younger half-sister
- Innocent as Achuthan "Achumama"
- Indrans as Koya
- Nandu as Sukumaran
- Kalasala Babu as Raghavan, Radhika's father
- Bhavani as Sreedevi, Balan's father's second wife
- Salu Kuttanadu as Neelandan
- Vimal Raj as Basheer
- Gopika Anil as Vidya, elder daughter of Balachandran
- Keerthana Anil as Aarya, younger daughter of Balachandran
- Kalabhavan Mani as Musthafa (cameo appearance)

== Soundtrack ==
The film features songs were composed by M. Jayachandran with lyrics by Gireesh Puthenchery. The background score was provided by C. Rajamani.

All lyrics are written by Gireesh Puthenchery; all music is composed by M. Jayachandran.

No.	Title	Singer(s)	Length
1.	"Innale Ente" (Kapi (raga))	K. J. Yesudas
2.	"Cholakkiliye"	M. G. Sreekumar
3.	"Karu Karu Karuthoru"	Mohanlal
4.	"Chilu Chilum"	M. G. Sreekumar, Sujatha Mohan
5.	"Innale Ente" (Kapi (raga))	K. S. Chithra

== Box office ==
The film was released on 28 August 2003 during the month of Onam festival. Balettan was a commercial success at the box office, becoming the highest-grossing Malayalam film of the year. Made on a budget of ₹1.75 crore, the film grossed ₹14 crore. It ran for over 100 days. The film gave box office success to Mohanlal after a gap of almost two years, which according to Rediff.com, "helped him regain the No. 1 spot". It was also the first major box office success of director Vinu.

== Awards ==
Award	Category	Winner	Ref.
Kerala Film Critics Association Awards	Most Popular Film	Balettan	
Kerala Film Critics Association Awards	Best Music Director	M. Jayachandran	
Asianet Film Awards	Best Actor	Mohanlal	
Vanitha Film Awards	Best Actor	Mohanlal	
