= Mayilattam (film) =

- Directed by: V. M. Vinu
- Written by: Mani Shornnur
- Produced by: Jolly Stephen; Baby Varghese
- Starring: Jayaram; Rambha; Indraja
- Cinematography: Venugopal Madathil
- Edited by: P. C. Mohanan
- Music by: Songs: M. Jayachandran; Score: C.Rajamani
- Production company: Konathappally Films
- Release date: 25 June 2004
- Country: India
- Language: Malayalam

Mayilattam is a 2004 Malayalam-language action comedy film directed by VM Vinu. It stars Jayaram in dual roles as the hero and villain, along with Rambha, Indraja, and Jagathy Sreekumar in the pivotal roles. The film was a commercial success at the box office. It was an Onam release of 2004.

== Plot ==
The film follows Devan, an ordinary villager whose life changes after he becomes the sole eyewitness to a murder committed by the local criminal Ripper Vasu. When Vasu later attempts to kill him to eliminate the witness, Devan injures him in self-defence and is forced to flee his village.

Accompanied by his brother-in-law, Devan escapes to Singanallur in Tamil Nadu, where he encounters Pazhani, a man who bears a striking resemblance to him. Acting on his brother-in-law's advice, Devan remains in Singanallur while Pazhani leaves with his brother-in-law. Owing to their identical appearance, the residents of Singanallur mistake Devan for Pazhani. As a result, Devan is blamed for several problems and disputes previously caused by Pazhani, forcing him to deal with the consequences of his lookalike's actions.

== Cast ==
- Jayaram in a dual role as:
  - Devan, The protagonist
  - Singanallur Pazhani, The main antagonist
    - Arun Kumar as Young Pazhani
- Rambha as Mythili, Pazhani's fiance
  - Gopika Anil as Young Mythili
- Indraja as Meenakshi, Devan's fiance
- Jagathy Sreekumar as Ayyappadasan, Devan's friend
- Sai Kumar as Thevar, Mythili's father
- Oduvil Unnikrishnan as Kannan Mash
- Bindu Panicker as Bindu
- Maniyanpilla Raju as Swaminathan
- Augustine as Murukan
- Ponnamma Babu as Ponnamma, Ayyappadasan's wife
- Vijayaraghavan as CI Antony Alex
- Zeenath as Mythili's mother
- Poornima Anand
- Bindu Ramakrishnan
- Riyaz Khan as Ripper Vasu
- Sadiq
- Ambika Mohan as Meenakshi

== Soundtrack ==
Music: M. Jayachandran. Lyrics: Gireesh Puthenchery

- "Kaattaadi Kiliye Vaa" - K. S. Chitra, V. M. Ajith
- "Maamazhayile" (F) - Sujatha Mohan
- "Maamzhayile" (M) - Madhu Balakrishnan
- "Maattupetti Koyilile" - Afsal, Chitra Iyer
- "Muthu Maniye Mutham Vechuko" - M. G. Sreekumar, Sujatha Mohan
- "Thakkida Tharikida" (Kacha Ketti Thaada) - M. G. Sreekumar, Jayaram

== Reception ==
A critic from Sify wrote, "On the whole Mayilattam provides enough laugh to those who like comedy entertainers". Screen wrote "Jayaram gives a very good performance as Devan and also as the villainous Pazhani. The leading ladies Indraja (as Meenakshi of Thennoorkunnu) and Rembha (as Mythili of Singanalloor) are their own usual selves." The critical described the cinematography by Venugopal, editing by Mohanan, art direction by Bawa and background score by Rajamani as the film's highlights, and "Of the songs penned by Gireesh Puthencherry and tuned by M Jayachandran, Kachcha kettithaada ... and ‘Mattupetti koyilile ...’ have come out well".
