= V. M. Vinu =

Indian film director in Malayalam cinema (born 1958)

- Born: V. M. Vinu; 30 November 1958 (age 67); Kozhikode, Kerala
- Occupation: film director
- Years active: 1986 – present

V. M. Vinu is an Indian film director and politician from Indian National Congress. He is best known for directing the film Balettan.

== Early life ==
V. M. Vinu was born into a middle-class family in Kozhikode, Kerala. His father, Vinayan, is a novelist & playwright. While studying in school, Vinu acted in AIR Dramas like Pottekad's 'Oru Desathinte Katha' and Mukundan's 'Mayyazhi Puzhayude Theerangalil.' He completed his BA degree course from Calicut University, then completed BTA from the School of Drama (Calicut University) under Prof. G. Sankara Pillai. He had participated in many art and cultural activities while studying and won best actor and director awards in school and college.

== Personal life ==
V. M. Vinu is married. The couple has a son, Varun, and a daughter, Varsha, who acted as Mammootty's elder daughter in Vesham.

== Career ==
After college, he started as an assistant director and has worked as an assistant to many directors before becoming an independent director. He worked as an assistant director in 7 movies and as an associate director in 8 movies. Some of them are 'Ore Thooval Pakshigal,' directed by Raveendran; 'Abhyam,' directed by Shivan; and 'Sooryamanasam,' directed by Viji Thampi. After establishing his independence, he directed 13 films. He has many hits to his credit with stars like Mammootty. and Mohanlal.

== Filmography ==
- Kuttymama (2019)
- Marupadi (2016)
- Face to Face (2012)
- Penpattanam (2010)
- Makante Achan (2009)
- Sooryan (2007)
- Yes Your Honour (2006)
- Bus Conductor (2005)
- Vesham (2004)
- Mayilattam (2004)
- Balettan (2003)
- Kanmashi (2002)
- Akashathile Paravakal (2001)
- Pallavur Devanarayanan (1999)
- Oro Viliyum Kathorthu (1998)
- Ancharakalyanam (1997)
- Swarna Kireedam (1996)
- Harichandanam (unreleased) (1993)
