= Shobi Thilakan =

Indian actor and dubbing artist

- Born: Plankamon, Ayroor, Pathanamthitta, Kerala, India
- Parents: Thilakan; Santha

Shobi Thilakan is an Indian actor and dubbing artist who works prominently in Malayalam films and television. He is the son of late actor Thilakan. Shobi has won the Kerala State Film Award for the best dubbing artist in 2021.

He provides the on-screen voice for a number of actors in films and television shows. He is playing a role in the serial Manjil Virinja Poovu, in which he plays a hefty part. Shobi also played a cameo role in Ammayariyathe.

== Filmography ==
| Year | Film | Role | Notes |
|---|---|---|---|
| 2012 | Namukku Parkkan | Pandian | |
| 2013 | Ayaal | | |
| 2014 | The Dolphins | | |
| 2018 | Varathan | Baby | |
| 2019 | Neeyum Njanum | | |
| 2019 | Kalippu | | |
| 2023 | 1921: Puzha Muthal Puzha Vare | Lavankutty | |
| 2023 | Ayalvaashi | | |
| 2023 | Pendulum | Antony | |
| 2024 | Grrr | Iravi | |
| 2024 | Bougainvillea | Inspector Suresh Rajan | |
| 2025 | Thudarum | Maniyans father | |
| 2025 | JSK: Janaki V v/s State of Kerala | CI Gopakumar | |
| 2026 | Aashaan | | |
| 2026 | Dridam | ASI Krishnan Kurup | |

== Voice-over ==
| Year | Film | Voice for | Character | Director |
|---|---|---|---|---|
| 2001 | Naranathu Thampuran | Baburaj | Vikraman | Viji Thampi |
| 2001 | Akashathile Paravakal | I. M. Vijayan | Valayar Manikyam | V.M. Vinu |
| 2001 | Nariman | Baburaj | Ajayan | K. Madhu |
| 2002 | Kuberan | Suresh Krishna | Sanjay | Sundar Das |
| 2002 | Bhavam | Murali Menon | Joy | Satish Menon |
| 2002 | Shivam | Baburaj | Medayil Ashokan | Shaji Kailas |
| 2002 | Shivam | Jijoy Rajagopal | Francis | Shaji Kailas |
| 2002 | Thandavam | Iqbal | DYSP | Shaji Kailas |
| 2002 | Stop Violence | Baburaj | Constable Sugunan | A. K. Sajan |
| 2002 | Stop Violence | Saji Soman | Acid | A. K. Sajan |
| 2002 | Chathurangam | Baburaj | S.I Thankaraj | K. Madhu |
| 2003 | The Fire | Mohan Raj | C.I Thomas Jose | Shankar Krishna |
| 2003 | Kasthooriman | Sumesh Surendran | Benny Joseph Alukka | A.K. Lohithadas |
| 2003 | Balettan | Riyaz Khan | Bhadran | V.M. Vinu |
| 2003 | Ivar | Lishoy | C.I | T.K. Rajeev Kumar |
| 2003 | Ivar | Rajesh Hebbar | Alambu Rajan | T.K. Rajeev Kumar |
| 2003 | War and Love | Prabhu | Lt Colonel Sharath Chandran | Vinayan |
| 2003 | Malsaram | Suresh Krishna | C.I Alex | Anil C. Menon |
| 2003 | Pattanathil Sundaran | Suresh Krishna | Kizhakkethil Sasidharan | Vipin Mohan |
| 2004 | Vamanapuram Bus Route | Adithya Menon | Karipidi Gopi | Sonu Shishupal |
| 2004 | Udayam | Anil | A.S.P Jithendran IPS | Vinu Joemon |
| 2004 | Wanted | Adithya Menon | Guru | Murali Nagavally |
| 2004 | Kakkakarumban | Riyaz Khan | Issac | M.A. Venu |
| 2004 | Natturajavu | Ranjith | Karnan | Shaji Kailas |
| 2004 | Sathyam | Anandaraj | City Police Commissioner Mambilly Mukundan Menon IPS | Vinayan |
| 2004 | Mampazhakkalam | Adithya Menon | Dr. Raghuram | Joshiy |
| 2004 | Black | Rahman | S.I Ashok Srinivas | Ranjith |
| 2005 | Iruvattam Manavaatti | Santhosh Jogi | | R. Sanal |
| 2005 | Thommanum Makkalum | Anand | Kaliyappan | Shafi |
| 2005 | Thommanum Makkalum | Baiju Ezhupunna | SI Thankaraj | Shafi |
| 2005 | Chandrolsavam | Ranjith | Kalathil Ramanunni | Ranjith |
| 2005 | Five Fingers | Riyaz Khan | Hari Narayanan IPS | Sanjeev Raj |
| 2005 | Pauran | Riyaz Khan | MLA Thomaskutty Alias Thomachan | Sundar Das |
| 2005 | Pandippada | Sabu Varghese | Kaali | Rafi–Mecartin |
| 2005 | By the People | Vincent Asokan | Paramasivan | Jayaraj |
| 2005 | Maanikyan | Suresh Krishna | Rajendran | K. K. Haridas |
| 2005 | Lokanathan IAS | Ranjith | Brahmanandan | Anil C. Menon |
| 2005 | Rajamanikyam | Ranjith | Simon Nadar | Anwar Rasheed |
| 2005 | Sarkar Dada | Riyaz Khan | Abbas | Sasi Shanker |
| 2006 | Highway Police | Riyaz Khan | C.I Jayachandran | Prasad Vallacherry |
| 2006 | Lion | Riyaz Khan | A.S.P Harshan IPS | Joshiy |
| 2006 | Vargam | Anand | Arakkal Shereef | M. Padmakumar |
| 2006 | Ravanan | Ajay Rathnam | R Krishna Moorthy Alias R K | Jojo K. Varghese |
| 2006 | Chinthamani Kolacase | Baburaj | Isra Qureshi | Shaji Kailas |
| 2006 | Chinthamani Kolacase | Biju Pappan | Sundaram | Shaji Kailas |
| 2006 | Chess | Jagannatha Varma | DIG Bharathan Kurup IPS | Raj Babu |
| 2006 | Chacko Randaaman | Adithya Menon | Karimbadam Gopi Alias Parunthu Gopi | Sunil Kariattukara |
| 2006 | Chacko Randaaman | Baburaj | Karimbadam Kannan | Sunil Kariattukara |
| 2006 | Moonnamathoral | Murali Menon | Vijaya Kumaran Menon | V. K. Prakash |
| 2006 | Jayam | Anandaraj | Njattuvetti Bharathan | Sonu Shishupal |
| 2006 | The Don | Spadikam George | DYSP Anirudhan | Shaji Kailas |
| 2006 | Bada Dosth | Riyaz Khan | S.I Niranjan Das | Viji Thampi |
| 2006 | Smart City | Baburaj | S.I Divakaran | B. Unnikrishnan |
| 2006 | Baba Kalyani | Kiran Raj | Basha | Shaji Kailas |
| 2006 | Kanaka Simhasanam | Kiran Raj | Narasimha Raju | Rajasenan |
| 2007 | Vikramadithyan | Ravi Teja | A.S.P Vikram Singh Rathore IPS & Athani Sathya Babu | S. S. Rajamouli |
| 2007 | Sketch | Saiju Kurup | Shivahari Iyer | Prasad Yadav |
| 2007 | Speed Track | Riyaz Khan | Tinu Nalinakshan | S.L. Puram Jayasurya |
| 2007 | Abraham & Lincoln | Manu Mohith | Sonarkella Shankarnath | Pramod Pappan |
| 2007 | Payum Puli | Riyaz Khan | Isaac John | Mohan Kupleri |
| 2007 | Big B | Shereveer Vakil | Sayippu Tony | Amal Neerad |
| 2007 | Chotta Mumbai | Jasper | Sebatti | Anwar Rasheed |
| 2007 | Khaki | Nawab Shah | Parthiban | Bipin Prabhakar |
| 2007 | Time | Mohan Raj | Kurian Varghese | Shaji Kailas |
| 2007 | Goal | Rahman | Vijay Das | Kamal |
| 2007 | Nanma | Rahman | Nakulan | Sarathchandran Wayanad |
| 2007 | Rakshakan | Ashish Vidyarthi | C.I Sugathan | Thulasidas |
| 2007 | Hallo | Mohan Raj | Pattambi Ravi Alias Chattambi Ravi | Rafi–Mecartin |
| 2007 | Hallo | Kundara Johny | City Police Commissioner | Rafi–Mecartin |
| 2007 | Yogi (Malayalam Version) | Prabhas | Eeswar Chandra Prasad Alias Yogi | V. V. Vinayak |
| 2007 | Bunny The Lion | Prakash Raj | Somaraj | V. V. Vinayak |
| 2007 | Black Cat | Ashish Vidyarthi | Prabhul Kumar | Vinayan |
| 2007 | Malliswari The Princess | Venkatesh | Prasad | K. Vijaya Bhaskar |
| 2007 | Romeo | Murali Mohan | Jayaraj Menon | Rajasenan |
| 2008 | Kabadi Kabadi | Bose Venkat | C.I Yatheendran | Sudheer-Manu |
| 2008 | Kabadi Kabadi | Besant Ravi | Pothu | Sudheer-Manu |
| 2008 | Tulasi (Malayalam Version) | Venkatesh | Tulasi Ram | Boyapati Srinu |
| 2008 | Aandavan | Anand | C.I Sadashivan Panicker | Akbar Jose |
| 2008 | One Way Ticket | Nishanth Sagar | Sasi | Bipin Prabhakar |
| 2008 | Shambu | Riyaz Khan | Parthasaradhi | K.B. Madhu |
| 2008 | Krishna | Prakash Raj | Neelakantan | Bhaskar |
| 2008 | Aayudham | Adithya Menon | Commissioner Mahendran IPS | M. A. Nishad |
| 2008 | Mayabazar | Vincent Asokan | Andrews | Thomas Sebastian |
| 2008 | Chandu | Jagapathi Babu | ACP Subhash Chandra Bose IPS | Sriwass |
| 2008 | Gulmohar | Kollam Thulasi | DYSP Shivan | Jayaraj |
| 2008 | Kurukshetra | Ravi Mariya | Brigadier Krishna | Major Ravi |
| 2008 | Thalappavu | Joly Joseph | DIG Pazhassi Raj | Madhupal |
| 2009 | Red Chillies | Biju Pappan | Satheeshan Alias Banker | Shaji Kailas |
| 2009 | Sagar Alias Jacky Reloaded | Sampath Raj | Michael Rosario | Amal Neerad |
| 2009 | I. G. – Inspector General | Ashish Vidyarthi | Scaria Zachariah | B. Unnikrishnan |
| 2009 | Samastha Keralam PO | Vincent Asokan | Michael Alias Christy Thomas | Bipin Prabhakar |
| 2009 | Black Dalia | Vimal Raj | Bhadran | Baburaj |
| 2009 | Passenger | Anandsami | Anali Shaji | Ranjith Sankar |
| 2009 | Dalamarmarangal | Sai Kumar | Pratapan | Vijayakrishnan |
| 2009 | Duplicate | Riyaz Khan | ACP Antony Rosarrio IPS | Shibu Prabhakar |
| 2009 | Kerala Varma Pazhassi Raja | R. Sarathkumar | Edachena Kunkan | Hariharan |
| 2009 | Simhakutty | Prakash Raj | Neelakantan | K. Raghavendra Rao |
| 2010 | Black Stallion | Ashish Vidyarthi | Irumban John | Pramod Pappan |
| 2010 | Black Stallion | Pawan | Perumal | Pramod Pappan |
| 2010 | Body Guard | Thiagarajan | Ashokan | Siddique |
| 2010 | Thanthonni | Ranjith | Neelakandan | George Varghese |
| 2010 | Pulliman | Ponvannan | Kalan Vasu | Anil K. Nair |
| 2010 | Varan | Arya | Diwakar | Gunasekhar |
| 2010 | Janakan | Sampath Ram | ACP Vikraman IPS | N. R. Sanjeev |
| 2010 | Alexander the Great | John Kokken | Thomas | Murali Nagavally |
| 2010 | Shikkar | John Kokken | Thampi | M. Padmakumar |
| 2010 | Vandae Maatharam | Arjun Sarja | SSP Anwar Hussain IPS | T. Aravind |
| 2010 | Arundhati (Malayalam Version) | Sonu Sood | Pasupathi | Kodi Ramakrishna |
| 2010 | Oridathoru Postman | Sarath Kumar | Yasin Mubarak | Shaji Azeez |
| 2010 | Chekavar | Sreejith Ravi | Udumbu Rocky | Sajeevan |
| 2010 | The Thriller | Vincent Asokan | RDX Anil | B. Unnikrishnan |
| 2010 | Elektra | Prakash Raj | Abraham | Shyamaprasad |
| 2010 | Anwar | Sampath Raj | Basheer | Amal Neerad |
| 2010 | Chaverpada | Pawan | Jehangir Mustafa Alias Jaggu Bhai | T. S. Jaspal |
| 2010 | Marykkundoru Kunjaadu | Anand | Johnykutty | Shafi |
| 2011 | Traffic | Rahman | Siddharth Shanker | Rajesh Pillai |
| 2011 | The Metro | R. Sarathkumar | C.I Jacob Alexander & Head Constable Alexander | Bipin Prabhakar |
| 2011 | Arjunan Sakshi | Anand | Rajan Thomas | Ranjith Sankar |
| 2011 | Urumi | Deepak Jethi | Balia Hassan | Santosh Sivan |
| 2011 | Doubles | Avinash | Louie | Sohan Seenulal |
| 2011 | China Town | Pradeep Rawat | Gowda | Rafi–Mecartin |
| 2011 | The Filmstaar | Thalaivasal Vijay | Sakhavu Ragahvan | Sanjeev Raj |
| 2011 | Melvilasom | Nizhalgal Ravi | Major Ajay Puri | Madhav Ramadasan |
| 2011 | Badrinath (Malayalam Version) | Prakash Raj | Bheeshma Narayanan | V.V. Vinayak |
| 2011 | Uppukandam Brothers: Back in Action | Richard Rishi | Ettuveetil Ganeshan | T. S. Suresh Babu |
| 2011 | Collector | Adithya Menon | John Williams | Anil C. Menon |
| 2011 | Manushyamrugam | Adithya Menon | Kamaal Pasha | Baburaj |
| 2011 | Manushyamrugam | Vijay Rangaraju | Para Vasu | Baburaj |
| 2011 | Teja Bhai & Family | Suman | Mohan Kartha | Diphan |
| 2011 | Sevenes | Sampath Ram | Beypoor Sreedharan | Joshiy |
| 2011 | Pachuvum Kovalanum | Riyaz Khan | C.I Sanjay | Thaha |
| 2012 | Asuravithu | Jiya Irani | Aaron | A. K. Sajan |
| 2012 | Asuravithu | I. M. Vijayan | Valarpadam Kurudhu Mustafa | A. K. Sajan |
| 2012 | Casanovva | Vikramjeet Virk | Alexi | Rosshan Andrrews |
| 2012 | Ordinary | Chemban Vinod Jose | C.I Habeeb Rahman | Sugeeth |
| 2012 | Hero | Thalaivasal Vijay | Dharmarajan Master | Diphan |
| 2012 | Bachelor Party | Rahman | Benny | Amal Neerad |
| 2012 | Bachelor Party | John Vijay | Prakash Kammath | Amal Neerad |
| 2012 | Eecha | Sudeepa | Sudeep | S.S. Rajamouli |
| 2012 | Simhasanam | Riyaz Khan | S.P Vetrivel Maran IPS | Shaji Kailas |
| 2012 | Gajapokkiri | Sonu Sood | Bichu | Trivikram Srinivas |
| 2012 | Scene Onnu Nammude Veedu | Thilakan | Vishwan | Shyju Anthikad |
| 2012 | Matinee | Thalaivasal Vijay | Moosa Haji | Aneesh Upasana |
| 2012 | Karmayodha | Murali Sharma | Khais Khanna | Major Ravi |
| 2013 | Romans | Nizhalgal Ravi | C.I Vetrimaran | Boban Samuel |
| 2013 | Lokpal | Thalaivasal Vijay | Public Prosecutor P.K. Ramabhadran | Joshiy |
| 2013 | Cowboy | Bala | Xavier | P. Balachandra Kumar |
| 2013 | Ithu Pathiramanal | Pradeep Rawat | Constable Shouriyar | M. Padmakumar |
| 2013 | Sound Thoma | Subbaraju | S.I Rakesh | Vysakh |
| 2013 | August Club | Thilakan | KPT Menon | K. B. Venu |
| 2013 | Mumbai Police | Rahman | Commissioner Farhan Aman IPS | Rosshan Andrrews |
| 2013 | Choodan | Sonu Sood | Nayak | Srinu Vaitla |
| 2013 | D Company ( Segment 1 : Oru Bolivian Diary 1995 ) | Aadukalam Naren | C.I Nripan Chakraborty | M. Padmakumar |
| 2013 | 3G | Ravi Mariya | Vasudevan | A. Jayaprakash |
| 2013 | Geethaanjali | Nassar | Kathalikaattu Thirumeni | Priyadarshan |
| 2014 | Bhaiyya My Brother | P. Sai Kumar | Dharma | Vamshi Paidipally |
| 2014 | Bhaiyya My Brother | Murali Sharma | ACP K. Ashok Varma IPS | Vamshi Paidipally |
| 2014 | Bhaiyya My Brother | John Kokken | Deva | Vamshi Paidipally |
| 2014 | Ring Master | Anand | Raju | Rafi |
| 2014 | Samsaaram Aarogyathinu Haanikaram | John Vijay | "Nuclear Star" Bhoomesh | Balaji Mohan |
| 2014 | Lucky The Racer | Ravi Kishan | Bellari Shiva Reddy | Surender Reddy |
| 2014 | Lucky The Racer | Prakash Raj | Prem Prakash | Surender Reddy |
| 2014 | Lucky The Racer | Paruchuri Venkateswara Rao | ACP Sameer's Father | Surender Reddy |
| 2014 | Cousins | Pradeep Rawat | Nagaraja Gowder | Vysakh |
| 2015 | Village Guys | Ranjith | Raghupathy | Shaan |
| 2015 | Temper (Malayalam Version) | Prakash Raj | Waltair Vasu | Puri Jagannadh |
| 2015 | Manikkyam | Ajay Ghosh. S | Krishnan Muthalali | R. J. Prasad |
| 2015 | S/O Satyamurthy (Malayalam Version) | Prakash Raj | Satyamurthy | Trivikram Srinivas |
| 2015 | Lavender | Thalaivasal Vijay | Joseph Tharakan | Altas. T. Ali |
| 2015 | Baahubali: The Beginning (Malayalam Version) | Rana Daggubati | Palwardevan | S.S. Rajamouli |
| 2016 | Vasuki | Mammootty | Advocate Louis Pothen | A. K. Sajan |
| 2016 | Aadupuliyattam | Om Puri | Yogendra Muni | Kannan Thamarakkulam |
| 2016 | Shenbaga Kottai | Om Puri | Yogendra Muni | Kannan Thamarakkulam |
| 2016 | Kasaba | Sampath Raj | Parameshwaran Nambiar | Nithin Renji Panicker |
| 2017 | Ezra | Babu Antony | Rabbi David Benyamin | Jay K. |
| 2017 | The Great Father (Tamil Version) | Mammootty | David Nainan | Haneef Adeni |
| 2017 | Baahubali 2: The Conclusion (Malayalam Version) | Rana Daggubati | Palwardevan | S.S. Rajamouli |
| 2017 | Raja Kireedam | Rana Daggubati | Jogendran | Teja |
| 2017 | Solo | Nassar | Brigadier Ramachandran | Bejoy Nambiar |
| 2018 | Parole | Prabhakar | Bullet Raghavan | Sharrath Sandith |
| 2018 | Ente Peru Surya, Ente Veedu India | Sarath Kumar | Gangan | Vakkantham Vamsi |
| 2018 | K.G.F: Chapter 1 (Malayalam Version) | Anant Nag | Anand Ingalagi | Prashant Neel |
| 2019 | Vinaya Vidheya Rama (Malayalam Version) | Mukesh Rishi | Parashuraman | Boyapati Srinu |
| 2019 | Yatra (Tamil Version) | Mammootty | Y. S. Rajasekhara Reddy | Mahi V Raghav |
| 2019 | Madhura Raja | R. K. Suresh | C.I David | Vysakh |
| 2019 | Rakshasan | Munishkanth | C.I Das | Ram Kumar |
| 2019 | Mangalath Vasundhara | Ranjith | DYSP Sathyasheelan | K.R. Sivakumar |
| 2019 | Kurukshetra (Malayalam Version) | Darshan | Duryodhanan | Naganna |
| 2020 | Bhoomiyile Manohara Swakaryam | | | Shyju Anthikad |
| 2021 | Jai Sulthan | Lal | Manzoor | Bakkiyaraj Kannan |
| 2021 | Black Widow (Malayalam Version) | David Harbour | Alexei Shostakov/Red Guardian | Cate Shortland |
| 2022 | Aaraattu | Riyaz Khan | Damodaran | B. Unnikrishnan |
| 2022 | RRR (Malayalam Version) | Ram Charan | Alluri Sitarama Raju | S. S. Rajamouli |
| 2022 | Acharya (Malayalam Version) | Ram Charan | Comrade Siddha | Koratala Siva |
| 2022 | Pathonpatham Noottandu | Sudev Nair | Padaveedan Nambi | Vinayan |
| 2022 | Vikrant Rona (Malayalam Version) | Sudeepa | Vikrant "Vicky" Rona | Anup Bhandari |
| 2022 | Ponniyin Selvan I (Malayalam Version) | R. Sarathkumar | Periya Pazhuvettaraiyar | Mani Ratnam |
| 2022 | Kumari | Spadikam George | Kaanhirangat Velyachan Thampuran | Nirmal Sahadev |
| 2022 | Kodeeshwaran 3 | Sudeepa | Satya & Shiva Alias Ghost | Shiva Karthik |
| 2023 | Ponniyin Selvan: II (Malayalam Version) | R. Sarathkumar | Periya Pazhuvettaraiyar | Mani Ratnam |
| 2023 | Skanda (Malaylam Version) | Sharath Lohithaswa | Ranjith Reddy | Boyapati Srinu |
| 2023 | Antony | Hariprasanth M.G | Tarzan | Joshiy |
| 2024 | Kadakan | Ranjith | Inspector Rajeev | Sajil Mampad |
| 2025 | Max (Malayalam Version) | Sudeepa | Inspector Arjun Mahakshay Alias Max | Vijay Karthikeyaa |

== Television ==
| Year | Serial | Role | Channel |
|---|---|---|---|
| 2006 | Swami Ayyappan | Chandakan | Asianet |
| 2007-2010 | Snehathooval | | Asianet |
| 2010 | Indraneelam | | Surya TV |
| 2013-2018 | Parasparam | S. I. Dhanabalan | Asianet |
| 2015 | My Marumakan | | Surya TV |
| 2016-2017 | Rathri Mazha | Chevala Raghavan | Flowers TV |
| 2016-2019 | Bharya | S. I. Balaraman | Asianet |
| 2018 | Makkal | Paramu | Mazhavil Manorama |
| 2019-2021 | Sathya Enna Penkutty | Padhmanabhan | Zee Keralam |
| 2019-2023 | Manjil Virinja Poovu | Bhaskaran | Mazhavil Manorama |
| 2020 | Namukku Paarkkuvan Munthirithoppukal | | Surya TV |
| 2020-2022 | Ente Maathavu | Bhoominathan | Surya TV |
| 2020-2023 | Ammayariyathe | DYSP Domnic Thomas | Asianet |
| 2020-2024 | Kudumbavilakku | Advocate Vasudevan | Asianet |
| 2022-2023 | Ennum Sammatham | DYSP | Mazhavil Manorama |
| 2022-2025 | Bhavana | Vijayapadman | Surya TV |
