= Sarath Das =

Indian actor and dubbing artist

- Born: 25 July 1978 (age 48); Aluva, Kerala, India
- Occupations: Actor; Voice artist
- Years active: 1993 – present
- Spouse: Manju Sarath
- Children: 2
- Parents: Kalamandalam Haridas; Saraswathi Haridas
- Awards: Kerala State Film Awards

Sarath Das (born 25 July 1978) is an Indian actor and dubbing artist who works in Malayalam films and television. He is known for his role as Lord Krishna in the serial Sree Mahabhagavatham telecasted on Asianet. He has had a lengthy career of over twenty five years. He received the Kerala State Film Award for Best Dubbing Artist twice.

== Early life ==
Sarath Das was born in Aluva to the prominent Kathakali singer Kalamandalam Haridas and Saraswathi. But, most of his life was spent in Thiruvananthapuram, where his father got settled. Sarath right from his childhood was trained in Mridangam and violin. He studied in NSS School, Perunthanni, Thiruvananthapuram. He is married to Manju and has two children. He has a younger brother named Harith.

== Career ==
Sarath's first film Swaham was released in 1994 in which he had the opportunity to act with his father. Later, he got a handful of opportunities including the evergreen hits like Ennu Swantham Janakikutty, Madhuranombarakattu, Indriyam, Devadoothan, Natturajavu and Pathram.

Later, he appeared in miniscreens where he acted in more than 100 television serials. Hence, he became a familiar face to the audience from Kerala. The most remarkable role acted by Sarath in television was that of Lord Krishna in the serial Sree Mahabhagavatham telecasted in Asianet. He was widely recognised throughout Kerala through this serial.He was also famous for playing the role of famous singer named Niranajan in Harichandanam which was a serial aired in Asianet.

He performed lead roles in many television operas including Manasu,Alavudeente Albhuthavilakku and Amma. He has also acted in Minnukettu, Sree Guruvayurappan, Manasaputhri, Autograph and many more.

Sarath is currently acting in the serial Bhramanam in which he portrays a character with negative shades.

Apart from acting, Sarath is also familiar as a dubbing artist. He has dubbed the voice of actor Sidharth Bharathan in the movie Nammal. He has also dubbed for Aravind Akash in the movie Koottu. He has lent voice to other prominent actors including Unni Mukundan, Sidharth Lama, Bala, Narain, Nishan and many more. He has also dubbed in the Malayalam versions of many famous Telugu films like Happy Days, Ithu Njangalude Lokam etc., and Kannada films Ishtam Enikkishtam, and James, where he dubbed for Puneeth Rajkumar. He has received Kerala State Film Award for Best Dubbing Artist for the film Achuvinte Amma in the year 2006.

== Filmography ==
=== Films ===
List of Sarath Das film credits
Year	Title	Role	Notes
1994	Swaham	Kannan	First film
1994	Sammohanam	Ambu	
1998	Ennu Swantham Janakikutty	Bhaskaran	
1999	Pathram	Ibnu	
2000	Darling Darling	Manikuttan	
2000	Indriyam	Anoop	
2000	Devadoothan	Manoj	
2000	Madhuranombarakattu	Iqbal	
2001	Sathyameva Jayathe	Sasi	
2002	Aabharanacharthu	Vishnu	
2002	Snehadoothu		
2004	Natturajavu	Samuel	
2004	Thudakkam	Rasheed Sulaiman	
2004	Rain Rain Come Again	Marco Polo	
2006	Chakkara Muthu	Rajeev	Cameo appearance
2007	July 4	Suresh Ramachandran	
2012	Molly Aunty Rocks!	Fr. Joby Mathews	
2014	Swapaanam		
2015	Oru Vadakkan Selfie	Uncredited role	
2015	Su.. Su... Sudhi Vathmeekam	Jayan	
2017	Matchbox	Appu	
2023	Kunjamminis Hospital	Dr. Sam Joseph	
2025	Am Ah		

== As dubbing artist ==
Year	Film	Dubbed For	Character
2002	Nammal	Sidharth Bharathan	Shyam
2004	Wanted	Aravind Akash	Nandhu
2004	Ennittum	Sidharth Bharathan	Jith
2004	Koottu	Aravind Akash	Balagopal
2004	Challenge	Nithiin	Prudhvi
2005	Otta Nanayam	Dinu Dennis	Aravindan
2005	December	K. V Manjulan	Dr Ravi Shankaranarayan
2005	Achuvinte Amma	Narain	Adv. Immanuel John alias Ijo
2006	Nottam	Ajir Shujahi	Vishnu
2007	Pranayakalam	Ajmal Ameer	Renjith
2007	Happy Days (Malayalam Version)	Varun Sandesh	Chandrashekhar
2007	Big B	Bala	Murugan John Kurishingal
2007	Ishtam Enikkishtam	Puneeth Rajkumar	Akash
2008	Ithu Njagalude Lokam	Varun Sandesh	Balu
2008	Sound of Boot	Bala	Rahul Krishna
2008	SMS	Bala	Kichan
2008	Orkkuka Vallappozhum	Rejith Menon	Sethumadhavan (Teen)
2009	Puthiya Mukham	Bala	Sudhi
2009	Robin Hood	Narain	Alexander Felix
2009	Angel John	Shanthnoo Bhagyaraj	Maradona Joseph
2010	Apoorvaragam	Nishan	Roopesh
2010	Alexander the Great	Bala	Manoj Varma
2010	Avan	Bala	Krishnan
2011	100% Love (Malayalam Version)	Naga Chaitanya	Balu
2011	Ninnishtam Ennishtam 2	Suresh Nair	Sreekumar
2011	Uppukandam Brothers: Back in Action	Shameer Khan	Uppukandom Sebastian
2011	Urumi	Ankur Khanna	Bhanu Vikraman
2012	Crime Story	Rahul Madhav	Sachin Jacob
2012	Ezham Suryan	Unni Mukundan	Chitrabhanu
2013	Rebecca Uthup Kizhakkemala	Sidharth Bharathan	Arjun
2013	Black Butterfly	Niranj Maniyanpilla Raju	Deepak
2014	Nadabrahmam	Kaushik Babu	Krishna
2015	Saaradhi	Vishnu Raghav	Dr. Deepak Peethambaran
2015	Kukkiliyar	Sajith Raj	
2015	Lavendar	Nishan	
2016	Study Tour	Kaushik Babu	
2016	Edavappathy	Siddharth Lama	Siddharath / Upagupta
2017	Hadhiya	Nishan	Brahmanandan
2017	Njanum Ente Sreeyum	Siddharth	Chandu
2022	James (Malayalam Version)	Puneeth Rajkumar	Santhosh Kumar aka “James”

== Television ==
Partial ist of Sarath Das television credits
Year	Title	Role	Channel	Notes
1996	Manasu		DD Malayalam	
1997	Kalippattangal		DD Malayalam	
1998	Vilasini	Unni	DD Malayalam	Telefilm
1999	Sandarshanam	Unni	DD Malayalam	Telefilm
2000	Nizhalukal		Asianet	
2001	Gandharvayamam		Asianet	
2003	American Dreams	Anand	Asianet	
2005-2008	Minnukettu		Surya TV	
2005	Sooryaputri		Surya TV	
2006	Ponnunjal		Asianet	
2007	Priyam	Manu	Kairali TV	
2007	Sree Guruvayurappan	Elarpadu Thampuran	Surya TV	
2007	Swantham Sooryaputhri		Asianet	
2008	Ammakkai		Surya TV	
2008	Mounam Nombaram		Kairali TV	
2008-2010	Sree Mahabhagavatham	Lord Krishna	Asianet	
2009	Sthree Manasu		Surya TV	
2009	Manasputhri		Surya TV	
2009	Vigraham		Asianet	
2010	Parayi Peta Panthirukulam		Surya TV	
2010-2012	Harichandanam	Niranjan	Asianet	
2002	Angadipattu		DD Malayalam	
2009-2010	Autograph	Deepan	Asianet	
2011-2012	Daivathinu Swantham Devootty		Mazhavil Manorama	
2011-2014	Amma	Sharath	Asianet	
2011-2012	Alauddinde Albuthavilakku	Alauddin	Asianet	
2012-2014	Pattu Saree	Harishankar	Surya TV	
2012	Innale		Surya TV	
2013	Ponnu Poloru Pennu		Kairali TV	
2013	Sree Padmanabham		Amrita TV	
2014	Chattambi Kalyani	Nandu	Jaihind TV	
2014-2015	Aniyathi	Alan	Mazhavil Manorama	
2015-2016	Kalyani Kalavani	Abhi	Asianet Plus	
2015-2016	Meghasandesham		Kairali TV	
2016	Bandhuvaru Shathruvar	Hari	Mazhavil Manorama	
2016	Sarayu		Surya TV	
2016	Sagaram Sakshi		Surya TV	
2017	Ennu Swantham Jani		Surya TV	
2018	Mamankam	Shankar Das	Flowers TV	
2018-2020	Bhramanam	Ravi Shankar	Mazhavil Manorama	
2019	Ayyappa Saranam	Lord Rama	Amrita TV	
2019-2020	Bhadra	Hari	Surya TV	
2021–2022	Daya: Chentheeyil Chalicha Kumkumapottu	Randeep	Asianet	
2023-2024	Balanum Ramayum	Balan	Mazhavil Manorama	
2024–Present	Meera	Lord Krishna	Amrita TV	
2024	Malikappuram: Apathbandhavan Ayyappan	Raghu	Asianet	

=== As host ===
- Rangoli
- Zoom In

== Awards ==
=== Kerala State Film Award ===
- 2005: Kerala State Film Award for Best Dubbing Artist for the film Achuvinte Amma
- 2017: Kerala State Film Award for Best Dubbing Artist for the film Edavappathy

=== Asianet Television Awards ===
- 2011: Asianet Television Awards 2011 for Most Popular Actor for the serial Harichandanam
- 2012: Asianet Television Awards 2012 for Best Star Pair for the serial Amma
- 2014: Asianet Television Awards 2014 for Most Popular Actor for the serial Amma
