= Boban Alummoodan =

Indian film and television actor

Boban Alumoodan
- Born: Boban Alumoodan
- Occupation: Actor
- Children: Silan, Szena
- Parent: Alummoodan

Boban Alummoodan is an Indian actor who appears in Malayalam films and Television serials. He is the son of the late Malayalam actor Alummoodan. He is best known for his role as Prakash Mathew in the 1999 movie Niram. Boban played a lead role in the horror movie Indriyam. He is also noted for his role in the movie Kalyanaraman. Later he shifted his focus to Television series playing lead and supporting roles.

== Filmography ==
Year	Title	Role	Notes
1991	Aakasha Kottayile Sultan	Pappy	
1996	Easwaramoorthy IN		
1998	Meenthoni		
1999	Niram	Prakash Mathew	
2000	Indriyam	Hari Varma	
2000	Swarna Chirakumayi		
2001	Nalacharitham Naalam Divasam	Nalinan	
2002	Mazhathullikilukkam	Sabu	
2002	Kalyanaraman	Dr. Sivadas	
2002	Punyam		
2002	Akhila		
2003	The Fire	Annirudhan	
2004	Njan Salperu Ramankutty		
2005	Thommanum Makkalum	Gopikrishnan	
2008	Shakespeare M.A. Malayalam	Alli's brother	
2008	Positive	Mahesh	
2008	Aandavan		
2009	Chattambinaadu	santhosh	
2010	Valiyangadi	Minister	
2010	Canvas	Baburaj	
2010	Thathwamasi	Minister	
2011	Kadhayile Nayika	Vijayan	
2012	Onappudava		
2015	Onnum Onnum Moonu		
2015	Ariyathe Ishtamayi		
2015	Chaamante Kabani		
2016	Crayons		
2017	Valapottukal	Sajeevan Master	
2017	Samadhanathinte Vellari Pravukal		
2019	Vallikkettu	Benny	
2019	Prathi Poovankozhi	Vivek	
2019	Driving Licence	Kottukappally	
2020	Love FM	Nazeer Ali	
2021	Salute	Mahesh	
2023	Love Revenge	Police Officer	
2024	Abraham Ozler	Sreedharan Nambiar	
2025	Mr Bengali The Real Hero		
2025	The Protector		

== Television serials (partial) ==
Year	Serial	Channel	Notes
	Roses in December	Doordarshan	
2001	Bharya	Asianet	
2001-2002	Makal Marumakan	Surya TV	
2002-2003	Seethalakshmi	Asianet	
2004	Thalolam	Asianet	
2004	123 Sat	Asianet	
2004	Mangalyam	Asianet	
2004	Chitta	Surya TV	
2005-2006	Sthreethwam	Surya TV	
2005-2006	Manthrakodi	Asianet	
2006	Swarnamayuram	Asianet	
2007	Nombarappoovu	Asianet	
2007	Aanineyum Pennineyum Kurichu	DD Malayalam	Telefilm
2008	Sree Mahabhagavatham	Asianet	
2008	Kudumbayogam	Surya TV	
2008-2009	Alilathali	Asianet	
2009	Koottukari	Surya TV	
2010-2011	Veera Marthandavarma	Surya TV	
2011	Melvilasavum Illatha Gramum	YouTube	Short film
2011	Vidaparayum Munbe	YouTube	Short film
2012	Onapudava	YouTube	Short film
2014-2015	Manjuthirum Mumpe	DD Malayalam	
2014-2015	Sangamam	Surya TV	
2015	Snehasangamam	Surya TV	Sequel to Sangamam
2016	Mizhi Randilum	Surya TV	
2016	Sagaram Sakshi	Surya TV	
2017-2018	Mamangam	Flowers TV	
2018	Makkal	Mazhavil Manorama	
2018–2019	Gauri	Surya TV	
2019	Sabarimala Swami Ayyapan	Asianet	
2019–2020	Priyapettaval	Mazhavil Manorama	
2019– 2021	Sathya Enna Penkutty	Zee Keralam	Photo Presence
2020	Koodathayi	Flowers TV	
2020	Thidukkam	YouTube	Short film
2020	Aparichithan	Goodness TV	Short film
2020-2023	Ammayariyathe	Asianet	
2021	Be Careful	YouTube	Short film
2021-2022	Manam Pole Mangalyam	Zee Keralam	
2021-2023	Swantham Sujatha	Surya TV	
2022	Ente Kuttikalude Achan	Mazhavil Manorama	
2023	Balanum Ramayum	Mazhavil Manorama	
2023	Shyamambaram	Zee Keralam	
2024- 2025	Madhuranombarakattu	Zee Keralam	
2024- 2025	Janakiyudeyum Abhiyudeyum Veedu	Asianet	
2026- present	Nila	Amrita TV	
