= Kerala State Film Award for Best Dubbing Artist =

Annual Indian film award

- Awarded for: Best dubbing artist in Malayalam cinema
- Sponsored by: Kerala State Chalachitra Academy
- Reward: ₹100,000 (US$1,100)
- First award: 1991
- Final award: 2023
- Most recent winner: Shobi Thilakan (Pathonpatham Noottandu); Pauly Valsan (Saudi Vellakka)

The Kerala State Film Award for Best Dubbing Artist is an award presented annually at the Kerala State Film Awards of India to the best dubbing in Malayalam film industry. In a number of years, the award has been given to one male and one female dubbing artist. Until 1997, the awards were managed directly by the Department of Cultural Affairs of the Government of Kerala. Since 1998, the awards have been controlled by the Kerala State Chalachitra Academy, an autonomous, non-profit institution functioning under the Department of Cultural Affairs. The winners (male and female) receives a certificate, statuette and a cash prize of ₹50,000 each.

== Superlatives ==
List of frequent winners
- Artist: Wins
| Sreeja Ravi | 4 |
| Bhagyalakshmi | 3 |
| Vimmy Mariam George | 3 |
| Shobi Thilakan | 3 |

Consecutive wins

| Artist | Wins | Year |
|---|---|---|
| Sreeja Ravi | 2 | 1997 - 1998 |
| Praveena | 2 | 2010 - 2011 |
| Sneha Paliyeri | 2 | 2017 - 2018 |

== Winners ==
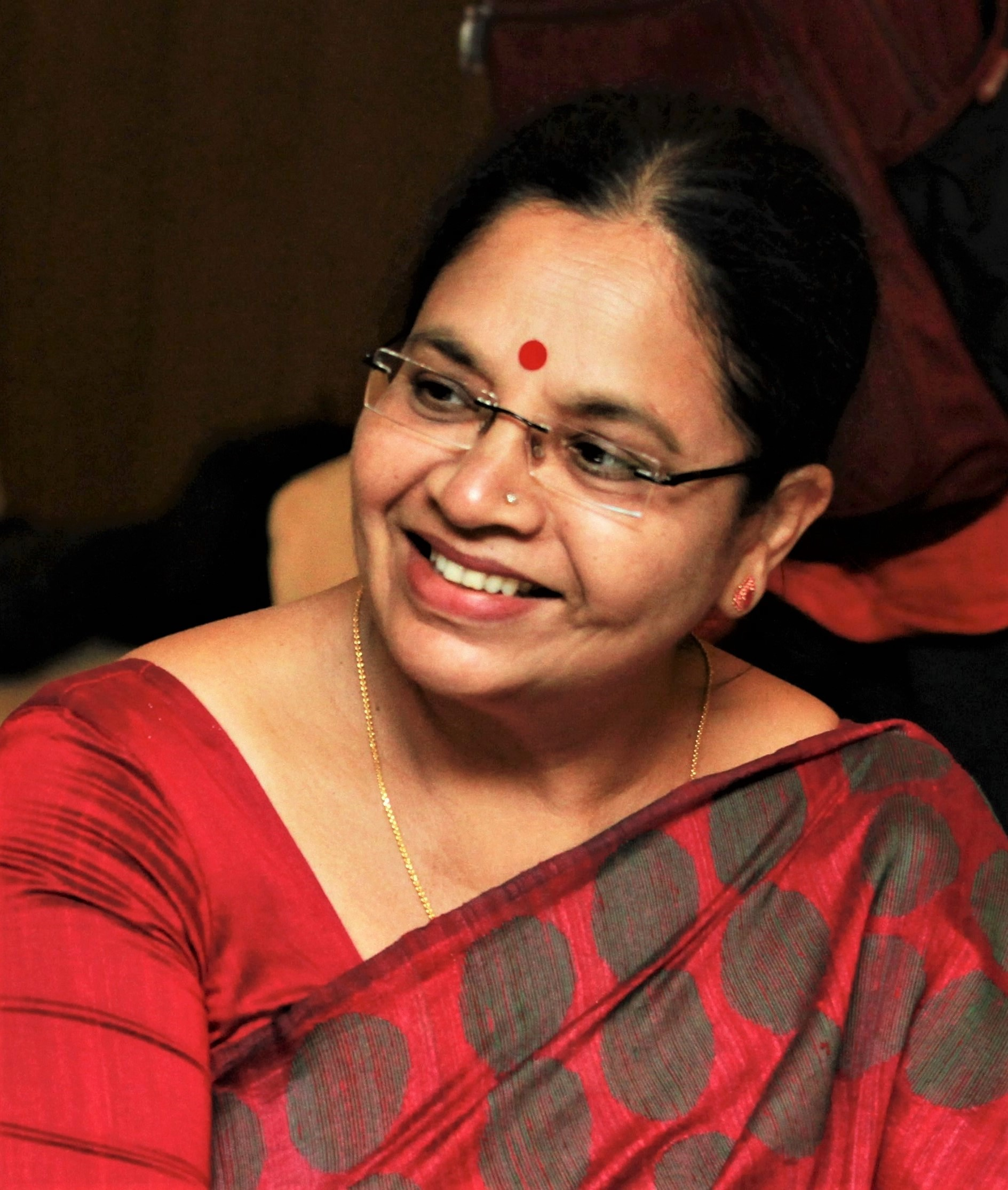
Bhagyalakshmi has won the award three times.

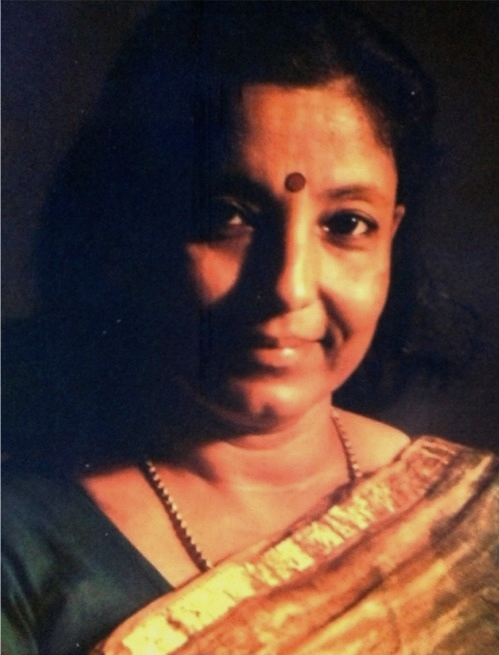
Anandavally lent her voice to 9 characters in a film.

| Year | Artist(s) | Film | Dubbed for |
|---|---|---|---|
| 1991 | Bhagyalakshmi | Ulladakkam | Amala Akkineni |
| 1991 | Bhagyalakshmi | Ente Sooryaputhrikku | Amala Akkineni |
| 1992 | Anandavally | Aadharam | Geetha |
| 1993 | Shammi Thilakan | Gazal | Nassar |
| 1994 | Krishnachandran | Kabooliwala | Vineeth |
| 1995 | Bhagyalakshmi | Kusruthikaatu | Kanaka |
| 1995 | Bhagyalakshmi | Ormakalundayirikkanam | Sreejaya Nair |
| 1995 | Bhagyalakshmi | Shashinas | Geetha Vijayan |
| 1996 | Venmani Vishnu | Deshadanam | Unnikrishnan Namboothiri |
| 1997 | Krishnachandran | Aniyathi Pravu | Kunchacko Boban |
| 1997 | Sreeja Ravi | Aniyathi Pravu | shalini Kumar |
| 1998 | Murali Menon | Agnisakshi | Rajat Kapoor |
| 1998 | Venmani Vishnu | Agnisakshi | Rajat Kapoor |
| 1998 | Sreeja Ravi | Aakasha Ganga | Divya Unni |
| 1998 | Sreeja Ravi | The Godman | Vani Viswanath |
| 1998 | Sreeja Ravi | Achamakuttiyude Achayan | Chippy |
| 1999 | No award | | |
| 2000 | S. Gopalakrishnan | Sayahnam | O. Madhavan |
| 2001 | M. Thankamani | Theerthadanam | Suhasini Mani Ratnam |
| 2002 | Bhagyalakshmi | Yathrakkarude Sradhakku | Soundarya |
| 2003 | Chottanikkara Baby | Gourisankaram | Narendra Prasad |
| 2004 | Meera Krishnan | Manju Poloru Penkutty | Amrita Prakash |
| 2005 | Sarath Das | Achuvinte Amma | Narain |
| 2005 | Surya S. Nair | Made In USA | Neha Pendse |
| 2006 | Vimmy Mariam George | Kaiyoppu | Khushbu |
| 2007 | Zeenath, Hafsath | Paradesi | Shweta Menon |
| 2008 | Sreeja Ravi | Minnaminnikkoottam | Roma |
| 2009 | Shobi Thilakan | Pazhassiraja | Sarath Kumar |
| 2010 | Rizabawa | Karmayogi | Thalaivasal Vijay |
| 2010 | Praveena | Elektra | Manisha Koirala |
| 2011 | Vijay Menon | Melvilasom | Thalaivasal Vijay |
| 2011 | Praveena | Ivan Megharoopan | Padmapriya Janakiraman |
| 2012 | Vimmy Mariam George | Nidra | Rima Kallingal |
| 2013 | Ambooty | Vasanthathinte Kanal Vazhikalil | Samuthirakani |
| 2013 | Sreeja Ravi | Ayaal | Iniya |
| 2014 | Sharran Puthumanna | White Boys | Kaushik |
| 2014 | Vimmy Mariam George | Munnariyippu | Aparna Gopinath |
| 2015 | Sarath Das | Edavappathy | Siddharth Lama |
| 2015 | Angel Shijoy | Haram | Radhika Apte |
| 2016 | Vijay Menon | Oppam | Samudrakani |
| 2016 | M. Thankamani | Olappeeppi | V. V. Kanchana |
| 2017 | Achu Arunkumar | Theeram | Pranav Ratheesh |
| 2017 | Sneha Paliyeri | Eeda | Nimisha Sajayan |
| 2018 | Shammi Thilakan | Odiyan | Prakash Raj |
| 2018 | Sneha Paliyeri | Lilli | Samyuktha Menon |
| 2019 | Vineeth | Lucifer | Vivek Oberoi |
| 2019 | Vineeth | Marakkar: Arabikadalinte Simham | Arjun Sarja |
| 2019 | Shruti Ramachandran | Kamala | Ruhani Sharma |
| 2020 | Shobi Thilakan | Bhoomiyile Manohara Swakaryam | |
| 2020 | Riya Saira | Ayyappanum Koshiyum | Gowri Nandha |
| 2021 | Devi S. | Drishyam 2 | Meena |
| 2022 | Shobi Thilakan | Pathonpatham Noottandu | Sudev Nair |
| 2022 | Pauly Valsan | Saudi Vellakka | Devi Varma |
| 2023 | Roshan Mathew | Ullozhukku | Arjun Radhakrishnan |
| 2023 | Roshan Mathew | Valatty | Dog character |
| 2023 | Sumangala | Jananam 1947 Pranayam Thudarunnu | Leela Samson |
| 2024 | Sayanora Philip | Barroz 3D | Joshua Okesalako |
| 2024 | Bhasi Vaikom | Barroz 3D | Voodoo (Animated) |
