= Jayakrishnan Kichu =

Indian film actor

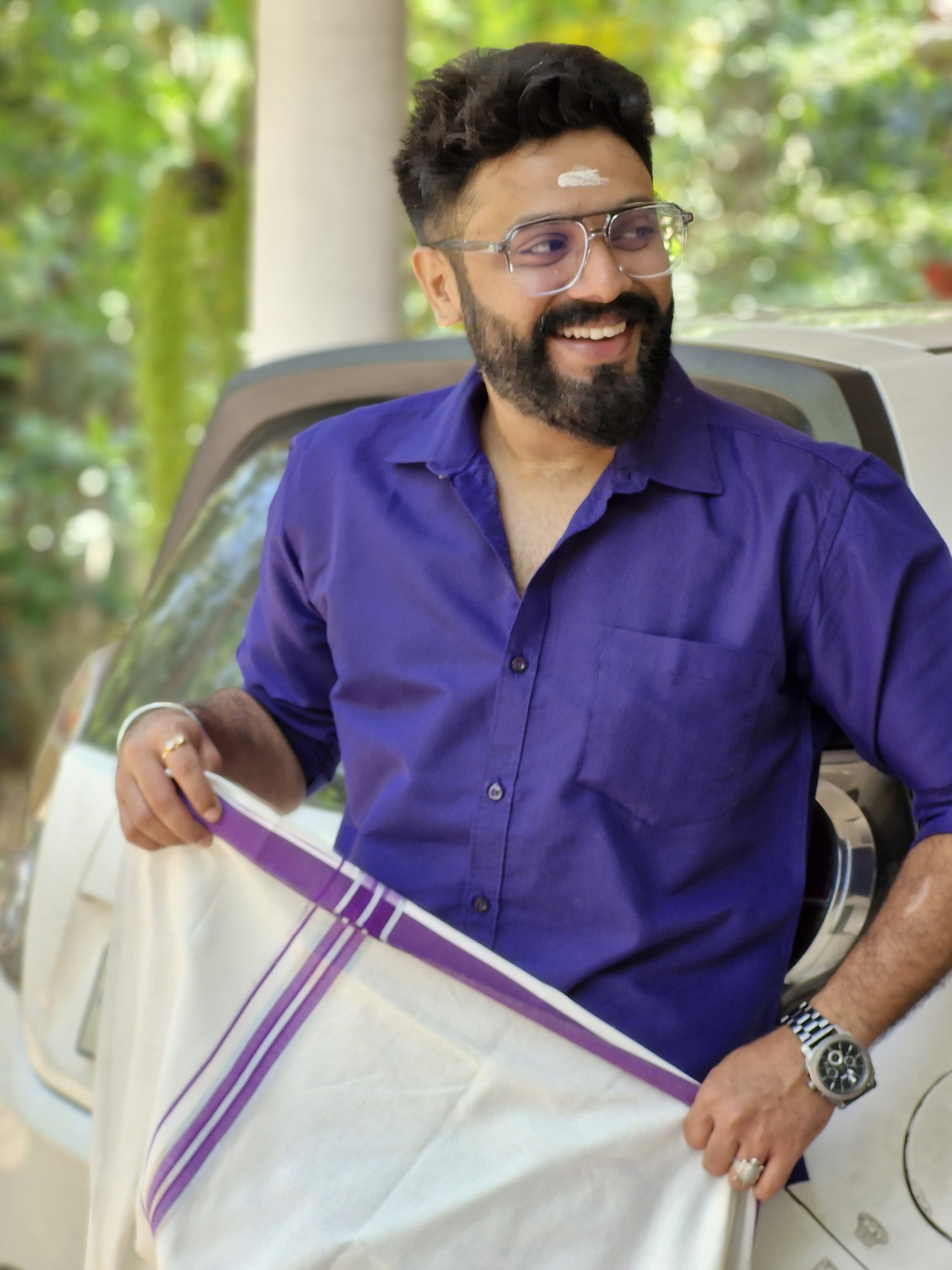
- Born: January 21, 1987 (age 39); Trivandrum, Kerala, India
- Other name: Jayakrishnan
- Education: Allama Iqbal College Peringamala
- Occupations: actor, Television Anchor, Dubbing Artist, Associate Director
- Years active: 2004–present

Jayakrishnan (born 21 January 1987), better known as Jayakrishnan Kichu, is an Indian actor, associate director, and Dubbing Artist who predominantly works in the Malayalam film industry. He was introduced as an actor by director Kamal with the film Manjupoloru Penkutti in 2004. He has performed the lead role in that movie. After that, he acted in Mohanlal starer Chandrolsavam. He also acted in movies such as Out of Syllabus, Bharathan Effect, Rakshakan, Subhadram, SMS, Shakespeare M.A. Malayalam, Raamanam, Mayakazcha, Dalamaramarangal, Ayal Sasi, Sandwich, 8:20.

Jayakrishnan has also starred in many Malayalam television serials. He also a television presenter, currently the host of Salt & Pepper in Kaumudy TV. Some of his notable serials are Kumkumapoov, Ammakai, Rudraveena, Mazhaariyathe, Balamani, Decemberile Akasham, Jagratha, Namukku Parkkuvan Munthiri Thoppukal.

== Early life ==
Jayakrishnan was born in a Hindu family in Karakulam, Trivandrum to Jayagopalan Nair and Sreekala. His father is an expatriate and his mother a homemaker. He has a sibling, his name is Jayashankar. Jayakrishnan received his school education at Iqbal Higher Secondary School, Peringamala. He graduated from Allama Iqbal College Peringamala. He made his acting debut in the Malayalam film industry in the film Manjupolooru Penkutti directed by Kamal.

== Career ==
Jayakrishnan's Malayalam film industry debut was under Kamal in Manjupolooru Pennkutty. The second movie was with Mohanlal in Chandrolsavam directed by Ranjith. After that, he acted in some movies in the supporting role. He has also dubbed for movies such as Summer in Bangkok, Innanu Aa kalyanam, Three Char Sua Beez, and Nayak. He has also worked as an associate director in the Malayalam film industry. he worked in 101 Chodyangal, Ayal Sasi, Rameshan oru Peralla, Done Many Ads. He is the host of the Food and Travel show Salt and Pepper in Kaumudy TV.

== Filmography ==
Year	Film	Language	Director
2004	Manjupole Oru Pennkutti	Malayalam	Kamal
2005	Chandrolsavam	Malayalam	Ranjith
2006	Out of Syllabus	Malayalam	Viswanathan
2007	Bharathan Effect	Malayalam	Anil Das
2007	Rakshakan	Malayalam	Thulasi Das
2007	Subhadram	Malayalam	Sreelal Devaraj
2008	SMS	Malayalam	Surjulan
2008	Shakespeare M.A. Malayalam	Malayalam	Shaji Azeez, Shaiju Anthikkad
2009	Raamanam	Malayalam	M. P. Sukumaran Nair
2009	Mayakazcha	Malayalam	Akhilesh Guruvilas
2009	Dalamarmarangal	Malayalam	Vijayakrishnan
2011	Sandwich	Malayalam	M.S. Manu
2014	8:20	Malayalam	Syaam
2017	Ayal Sasi	Malayalam	Sajin Baabu

== Television ==
Year	Serial	Channel	Notes
2007	Ammakai	Surya TV	TV series
2009	Mazhayariyathe	Surya TV	TV series
2010-2011	Rudraveena	Surya TV	TV series
2011-2014	Kumkumapoovu	Asianet	TV series
2013	Kathayariyathe	Surya TV	TV series
2014-2015	Balamani	Mazhavil Manorama	TV series
2014	Njgal Santhushtaranu	Asianet Plus	TV series
2018–2022	Salt And Pepper	Kaumudy TV	TV show as Host
2019	Decemberile Akasham	Amrita TV	TV series
2019	Jagratha	Amrita TV	TV series
2020	Namukku Paarkkuvan Munthirithoppukal	Surya TV	TV series
2020	Sumangali Bhava	Zee Keralam	TV series
2024-2025	Panchagni	Flowers TV	TV series
2026	Valiyettan	Zee Keralam	TV series
