= Big B (film) =

2007 film by Amal Neerad

- Theatrical release poster
- Directed by: Amal Neerad
- Written by: Unni R.
- Produced by: Shahul Hameed Marikar; Anto Joseph
- Starring: Mammootty; Manoj K Jayan; Bala; Sumit Naval
- Cinematography: Sameer Thahir
- Edited by: Vivek Harshan
- Music by: Score: Gopi Sundar; Songs: Alphons Joseph
- Production company: Marikar Films
- Distributed by: Marikar Films
- Release date: 13 April 2007 (India)
- Running time: 130 minutes
- Country: India
- Language: Malayalam

Big B (short form of Big Brother) is a 2007 Indian Malayalam-language action thriller film directed by Amal Neerad in his directorial debut. It stars Mammootty in the titular role alongside an ensemble cast of Manoj K. Jayan, Bala, Pasupathy, Mamta Mohandas and Sumit Naval. In the film, Four brothers hunt for the killer and the truth behind their loving foster mother who was murdered in cold blood.

The cinematography and editing were handled by Sameer Thahir and Vivek Harshan, while the music was composed by Alphonse Joseph and Gopi Sundar.

Despite being an unofficial remake of the 2005 American film Four Brothers, Big B is considered a pathbreaking film in the history of Malayalam cinema due to its stylish making and also introduced a new style of filmmaking, thus attaining a huge cult following.

The film is widely regarded as one of the defining films of the Malayalam New Wave.

== Plot ==
Mary John Kurishingal, an unmarried social activist gets brutally killed under mysterious circumstances, where her adopted sons arrive for her funeral: Bilal- a dreaded criminal and a trapez player in Mumbai, Eddy- a hotel owner, Murugan – an action choreographer in Malayalam cinema and Bijo- a student. The brothers take it upon themselves to unearth the mystery behind Mary's murder. Murugan is in love with Rimy, the daughter of Tommy Parekkadan, a happy-go-drunkard, who is against their relationship. Bilal starts meeting his old friends and contacts in the Kochi underworld to receive information about the killers.

The brothers piece the evidence together and learns that the murder was committed by two assassins from Mumbai. ACP Balaji Shakthivel and CI George are assigned to investigate Mary's murder case, where they begin the investigation and learns that the murder was one of the many meticulously planned operations aimed at checking Mary's intrusions into the unlawful exporting of children from Kochi. The unlawful operations are actually handled by the Mayor and his henchman Sayippu Tony, a notorious and psychotic crime boss.

Meanwhile, Bilal makes Tommy accept Murugan and Rimy's relationship. One night, Bijo gets killed by Tony's henchmen. However, Bilal shoots one of the henchmen to death and learns that Tony is behind the series of crimes. Later, Tony kills Shakthivel and warns the Mayor to obey his instructions. Bilal orders Eddy and Murugan to negotiate with Tony to know his demands. Tony's right hand Pandi Asi and Tony's henchmen, joins Bilal and his brothers as he wants to seek revenge on Tony, where they also become successful in keeping George (who was Tony's sidekick) on their side.

Bilal threatens the Mayor that he will expose his corrupt plans to the whole media, which causes the Mayor to shoot himself to death. George files this as a suicide in order to save Bilal from the case. Eddy and Murugan are called to an island by Tony and his henchmen. Tony arrives and opens up to Eddy about his plans to kill Bilal and the brothers, but Tony learns that his henchmen were bribed and are now against him. Asi reveals his grudge against Tony. At that time, Bilal arrives at the island and kills Tony after a long fight, thereby avenging Mary's and Bijo's deaths. Tony is buried in a ditch by his men. After their mission, Eddie lives a happy and peaceful life with his family. Murugan spends time cheering with Rimy, while Bilal is seen helping the poor kids of their colony and feeling Mary's presence in the house.

== Cast ==
- Mammootty as Bilal John Kurishingal
- Manoj K. Jayan as Eddy John Kurishingal
- Bala as Murugan John Kurishingal (voiceover by Sarath Das)
- Sumeet Naval as Bijo John Kurishingal
- Nafisa Ali as Mary John Kurishingal
- Shereveer Vakil as "Sayippu" Tony (voiceover by Shobi Thilakan)
- Pasupathy as ACP Balaji Sakthivel IPS
- Vijayaraghavan as CI George
- Innocent as Tommy Parekkadan, Rimi's father
- Mamta Mohandas as Rimi Tommy, Murugan's love interest
- Lena as Celina, Eddy's wife
- Maniyanpilla Raju as Dr. Venu
- Manasa as Gauri, Bijo's love interest and Dr. Venu's daughter
- Vinayakan as :Pandi" Asi, Tony's henchman
- Sreejith Ravi as Anthakaram Babu
- Santhosh Jogi as Felix, Local goon and Tony's henchman
- Jaffar Idukki as "Dog" Shamsu
- Ramesh Varma as Mayor
- Jinu Joseph as Killer 1
- O. G. Sunil as Killer 2
- V. K. Sreeraman as Advocate
- Govind Nambiar as Abu
- Paris Laxmi as Dancer in the song "Oh January"

== Release ==
Big B was released on 13 April 2007. Amal Neerad announced a sequel to the film titled Bilal in 2017. It was dubbed in Tamil as Manik Baasha.

== Reception ==
Big B initially received mixed to negative reviews from the critics as family films were dominant back then. Later on, it received critical acclaim for its cinematography and making, along with the use of few dialogues, dark color tone, and extensive use of slow-motion and musical score, which redefines that an age-old mass action drama can be converted with a unique and fresh style. Mammootty gained lot of appraisal for his portrayal as Bilal which remains one his most memorable characters.

== Soundtrack ==
Big B

Soundtrack album by Alphons Joseph
- Released: July 25, 2007
- Recorded: 2006
- Genre: Feature film soundtrack
- Length: 31:05
- Label: Divo TV Pvt Ltd.
- Producer: Alphons Joseph

The soundtrack album was composed by Alphons Joseph with lyrics penned by Jophy Tharakan and Santhosh Varma. The musical score was composed by Gopi Sundar. The song 'O January' is an unofficial cover of Shakira's Ojos Así.

Big B (Original motion picture soundtrack)
No.	Title	Lyrics	Singers	Length
1.	"Hip Hop"	Santhosh Varma	Shirdhin Thomas, Shelton Pinheiro	03:23
2.	"Muthumazha"	Jophy Tharakan	Vineeth Sreenivasan, Jyotsna	04:27
3.	"O January"	Jophy Tharakan	Sayanora Philip	05:17
4.	"Oru Vakkum [M]"	Jophy Tharakan	Alphons Joseph	04:01
5.	"Oru Vakkum [Version 2]"	Santhosh Varma	Alphons Joseph, Mridula Warrier	04:03
6.	"Theme Song"		Alphons Joseph	05:06
7.	"Vidaparayukayano"	Santhosh Varma	Shreya Ghoshal	04:45
Total length:				31:05

== Sequel ==
A sequel titled Bilal was announced by Amal Neerad on 17 November 2017 and was set to start principal photography in March 2020 but was postponed indefinitely owing to COVID-19 pandemic and has been in pre-production due to script changes and scale.

== Awards and nominations ==
Date of ceremony	Award	Category	Recipient(s) and nominee(s)	Result	Ref.
7 October 2008	Asianet Film Awards	Best Actor - Male	Mammootty	Won	
