= Thaskaraveeran (2005 film) =

- Directed by: Pramod Pappan
- Screenplay by: Dennis Joseph
- Story by: Antony Eastman
- Produced by: Vindhyan Dinan
- Starring: Mammootty; Nayanthara
- Cinematography: Jibu Jacob
- Edited by: P. C. Mohanan
- Music by: Ouseppachan
- Release date: 27 May 2005
- Running time: 165 minutes
- Country: India
- Language: Malayalam

Thaskaraveeran ( The brave thief /The great thief ) is a 2005 Indian Malayalam-language film directed by Pramod Pappan. The film stars Mammootty with Nayanthara, Sheela, Madhu, Innocent, Rajan P.Dev, Siddique, and Mamukkoya in supporting roles. It has a dubbed Hindi version which is called Kala Samrajya.

== Plot ==
Arakkalam Peeli, a veteran thief, adept in creating different masks was killed by Eapen with an indirect support from the former's son Arakkalam Kuttappan. Kuttappan's son, Baby, who happens to witness the murder runs away from the village. He later becomes a smuggler and robber.

Several years later Kuttappan is sent to prison by a cunning Eapen who is then a rich businessman over an issue related to loan. This causes Baby to return to his village. He gives him gold biscuits to settle the matter and bails out his father. That night Baby manages to steal the same biscuits from Eapen's house by pretending to be his eldest son Thommi. He uses a mask just as his grandfather used to. After handing over the biscuits to Mumbai-based gangster he decides to settle in his village. He stays with Meenakshi, his late grandfather's ex-lover, and seldom meets his father (as he is unable to completely forgive him due to his involvement in his grandfather's murder). He vows to destroy the wealth of Eapen and how he does it forms the rest of the story.

== Cast ==
- Mammootty as Arakkalam Kochu Baby / Arakkalam Bhai
  - Ashwin as Young Baby
- Nayanthara as Thankamani
- Sheela as Meenakshi
- Madhu as Arakkalam Peeli
- Innocent as Malayil Eapen
- Rajan P. Dev as Arakkalam Kuttappan
- Siddique in a dual role as:
  - Malayil Thommi
  - Shape shift of Arakkalam Kochu Baby to Malayil Thommi, by using prosthetic mask
- Salim Kumar as Postman Sugathan
- Baburaj as Malayil Peter
- Niyaz Musaliyar as Malayil Tony
- Kiranraj as Zaakir Ali
- Mamukkoya as Beerankutty
- Augustine as CI Ayyappan Pillai
- Mohan Jose as Chandy
- T. P. Madhavan as Ramkumar
- Spadikam George as Malayil Itty
- Bheeman Raghu as Kargil Narayanan
- Kunchan as Raghavan Maashu
- Radhika as Sethulakshmi
- Ashkar Saudan as Jithulal
- Kishor Satya as Deepu
- Biyon as Balu
- Subbaraju as Sabu, Smuggler
- Anil Nedumangad as Narayanan Kutty
- Dinesh Prabhakar as Villager
- Deepika Mohan as Raghavan's wife
- Sruthi Nair

== Soundtrack ==
- "Chenthamare Vaa" - Madhu Balakrishnan
- "Aarthirimulle" - Balu
- "Karimukilil" - Franco
- "Aarthirimulle (version 2)" - Srinivas
