= List of Malayalam films of 2008 =

== Released films ==
The following is a list of Malayalam films released in the year 2008.

Mo	Title	Director	Producer	Cast
J A N	Of the People	Jayaraj	Jayaraj	Arun, Padmakumar, Arjun
J A N	Novel	East Coast Vijayan	East Coast Vijayan	Jayaram, Sadha
J A N	Roudram	Ranji Panicker	Shahul Hameed Marikar, Anto Joseph	Mammootty
J A N	College Kumaran	Thulasidas	Bency Martin	Mohanlal, Vimala Raman
F E B	Sound of Boot	Shaji Kailas	Sai-Meera Productions	Suresh Gopi
F E B	Calcutta News	Blessy	Thampi Antony	Dileep
F E B	Cycle	Johny Antony	Thilakan Thandasseri, Sunny Kuruvila, Viswanathan Nair	Vineeth Sreenivasan, Bhama, Vinu Mohan, Sandhya, Jagathy Sreekumar
F E B	Oridathoru Puzhayundu			
M A R	Malabar Wedding	Rajesh-Faisal	T. Santhoshkumar, K. B. Devaraj	Indrajith, Gopika
M A R	Kerala Police	Chandrashekaran	T.K.M. Release	Kalabhavan Mani, Swarnamalya, Lakshmi Sharma
M A R	Shalabam	Suresh Palanshery	Aseez Kadalundi, Alavi Ramanattukara, Rasheed Perumanna	Ramya Nambeeshan, Sudheesh, Kaithapram Damodaran Namboothiri
M A R	Mohitham	Saleem Baba	Sulaiman Kootayi	Rajin Roshan, Kollam Thulasi, Sphadikam George
M A R	Gopalapuranam	K. K. Haridas	C. P. Rafeeq, Zakheer Hussain	Mukesh, Ramana
M A R	Jubilee	G. George	Alex Chacko, Anto Mathew	Innocent, Sai Kumar, Jagathy, Manoj K. Jayan
A P R
A P R	De Ingottu Nokkiye	Balachandra Menon	A. V. Anoop	Jayasurya, Jagathy Sreekumar, Sarah, Thilakan, Edavela Babu
A P R	Innathe Chintha Vishayam	Sathyan Anthikkad	Antony Perumbavoor	Mohanlal, Meera Jasmine, Mamukkoya
A P R	Annan Thambi	Anwar Rasheed	Anto Joseph, Shahul Hameed Marikar	Mammootty, Gopika, Janardhanan, Lakshmi Rai
M A Y	Mulla	Lal Jose	Shibin Becker, Jemi Hameed, Sagar Shereef, Sundararajan	Dileep
M A Y	Pachamarathanalil	Leo Thaddeus	G. Sureshkumar	Sreenivasan, Padmapriya, Sukanya
M A Y	Positive	V. K. Prakash	Fabulance Entertainment Pvt Ltd	Jayasurya, Suraj Venjaramood, Manikkuttan, Sai Kumar
M A Y	Shakespeare M.A. Malayalam	Shaiju - Shaji	K.K. Narayandas, Saseendra Verma	Jayasurya, Roma, Kalabhavan Mani, Jagathy Sreekumar
M A Y	Swarnam	Venugopan	Soman Pallat	Kalabhavan Mani, Jagathy Sreekumar, Murali
M A Y	Aandavan	Akbar Jose	Cinema Company	Kalabhavan Mani, Sindhu Menon, Jagathy Sreekumar
J U N	Aakasha Gopuram	Henrik Ibsen (story); K. P. Kumaran (script)	Manu Kumaran; Taizoon F. Khorakiwala	Mohanlal, Sreenivasan, Nithya Menen
J U N	Mizhikal Sakshi	Ashok R. Nath	V. R. Das (Cyber Vision)	Mohanlal, Sukumari, Nedumudi Venu, Mala Aravindan
J U N	Magic Lamp	Haridas		Jayaram, Meena, Divya Unni, Oduvil Unnikrishnan
J U N	One Way Ticket	Bipin Prabhakar	Thiruvangadan Entertainments	Mammootty, Prithviraj Sukumaran, Bhama, Jagathy Sreekumar, Thilakan
J U L	Madambi	B. Unnikrishnan	Joshy	Mohanlal, Kavya Madhavan
J U L	Minnaminnikoottam	Kamal	Rakhuram	Narain, Indrajith, Jayasurya, Samvrutha Sunil, Meera Jasmin, Roma
J U L	Parunthu	M. Padmakumar	Howly Pottoor	Mammootty, Lakshmi Rai, Jagathy Sreekumar
J U L	Mayakazhcha	Akhilesh Guruvilas	Hussain Koolimuttum	Sudheesh, Jayakrishnan, Cochin Haneefa, Aravind Akash
J U L	Laptop	Rupesh Paul	E. A. Joseprakash	Suresh Gopi, Padmapriya
J U L	Kanichukulangarayil CBI	Suresh Vinu	Sreekumaran Thampi	Manoj K. Jayan, Sai Kumar
A U G	Kabadi Kabadi	Sudheer Manu	Mani C. Kaappan, Paulose, Roy	Kalabhavan Mani, Mukesh, Rambha
A U G	Aayudham	Nishad		Suresh Gopi, Karthika, Bala, Bharathi, Biju Menon
A U G	Veruthe Oru Bharya	Akku Akbar, Gireesh Kumar	Salahudeen	Jayaram, Gopika
A U G	SMS	Surjulan	Prasannan	Bala, Navya Nair, Mukesh
S E P	Parthan Kanda Paralokam	Anil	K. B. Madhu	Jayaram, Sreedevika
S E P	Thirakkatha	Ranjith	Ranjith, Maha Subair	Prithviraj, Priyamani, Anoop Menon
S E P	Thalappavu	Madhupal	Mohan	Prithviraj
S E P	Chithrasalabhangalude Veedu	Krishnakumar	Alex Chacko, Anto Mathew	Master Ganapathy
S E P	Apoorva	Nithin Ramakrishnan	Dr. Ramakrishnan, Dr. Samson Pachikara	Sajeev, Helen, Ajay Sathyan
S E P	Atayalangal	M. G. Sasi	Aravind Venugopal	Govind Padmasurya, Jyothirmayi, T. G. Ravi
O C T	Kurukshetra	Major Ravi	Santosh Damodar	Mohanlal
O C T	Mayabazar	T. A. Razakh	Saji S. Mangalath	Mammootty
O C T	Rathri Mazha	Lenin Rajendran	Green Cinema House	Vineeth, Meera Jasmin, Manoj K. Jayan, Biju Menon
O C T	Gulmohar	Jayaraj	Mathews	Renju, Siddique, Neena Mathew
O C T	Shambu	K. B. Madhu		Vijayakumar, Karthika Mathew, Geetha
N O V	Twenty:20	Joshy; Uday Krishnan-Sibi Thomas	Dileep for AMMA	Mammootty, Mohanlal, Suresh Gopi, Jayaram, and many members of AMMA
N O V	Thavalam	Baiju	Jagadish	Suresh Gopi, Baby Diya, Rithya
N O V	Pakal Nakshatrangal	Rajiv Nath	Chaya Films	Mohanlal, Suresh Gopi
N O V	Sultan	Sreeprakash	Gopi Manasseri	Vinu Mohan, Varada, Anoop Chandran, Sreejith Ravi
D E C	Crazy Gopalan	Deepu Karunakaran	Ulattil Sasi	Dileep, Salim Kumar, Harisree Ashokan, Manoj K. Jayan
D E C	Lollipop	Shafi	A. B. S. Combines	Kunchacko Boban, Prithviraj Sukumaran, Jayasurya, Bhavana (Malayalam actress), Roma
D E C	Chempada	Robin Thirumala	Jagadish K. Nair, Abdul Azeez	Bala, Sridevika
D E C	Bullet	Nissar	Nazim Vellila	Suresh Gopi, Kalabhavan Mani
	Kanal Kannaadi			
	Kovalam			
	Anthiponvettam			
	Vilapangalkkappuram			
	Chandranilekkoru Vazhi			
	Robo			
	Oru Pennum Randaanum			
	Thrill			
	Ssh..Silence Please			
	Bioscope	K. M. Madhusudhanan		Walter Wagner, Murugan
	D-17	Chidambaram, Manu		Atul Kulkarni, Ajmal Ameer, Sandhya
	Raman	Dr, Biju		Anoop Chandran, Avantika Akerkar
	Njaan	Nazar Aziz		Jishnu Raghavan, Karthika Mathew

== Dubbed films ==
Opening	Title	Director(s)	Original film		Cast	Ref.
Opening	Title	Director(s)	Film	Language	Cast	Ref.
August	Homam	J. D. Chakravarthy	Homam	Telugu	Jagapathi Babu, Mamta Mohandas	
November	Rajamudra	Ravi Sharma	Veedu Maamulodu Kaadu	Telugu	Rishi, Samrat, Gopika, Bhanu Chandar	
