= Indriyam =

- VCD cover
- Directed by: George Kithu
- Starring: Vani Viswanath; Vikram; Nishanth Sagar; Boban Alummoodan; Lena
- Cinematography: Prathapan
- Edited by: B. Ajithkumar
- Music by: Berny-Ignatius
- Release date: 8 June 2000
- Running time: 129 minutes
- Country: India
- Language: Malayalam

Indriyam is a 2000 Indian Malayalam-language horror film directed by George Kithu. The film is about a group of college friends who go into a haunted forest, with Vani Viswanath, Vikram, Nishanth Sagar, Boban Alummoodan and Lena appearing amongst others in the cast. It was dubbed and released in Tamil as Manthira Kottai in December 2000, shortly after the success of Sethu, in which Vikram had featured.

== Plot ==
A college group of anthropology students go to the remote forest of Muthuvan Mala, under the oversight of Prof. Shankaranarayanan, in order to study the tribal life which had existed there. A student, Sunny, unknowingly unleashes the spirit of Neeli, who is a ghost seeking revenge against the Thripangod royal family, one of whom had killed her and her lover. Consequently, Neeli starts killing off the students one by one and the police call for sorcerer Vadakkedath Namboothiri to be summoned the ghost of neeli

== Cast ==
- Vani Viswanath as Neeli
- Boban Alummoodan as Hari Varma
- Vikram as Udhaya
- Nishanth Sagar as Sunny
- Lena as Sreedevi
- Yadhu Krishnan as Vijay
- Sharath Das as Anoop
- Devan as Rajaraja Varma Thirumanas
- Cochin Haneefa as C. I. Theepori Veerabhadran
- Raghavan as Professor Shankaranarayanan (Mahatma Gandhi University)
- Ravi Vallathol as Ravi Varma
- Aranmula Ponnamma as Muthassi
- Geetha Nair as Hari Varma's mother
- Prathapachandran as Vadakkedath Namboothiri
- Nandu as Prof. Joseph Erumeli
- Kochu Preman
- Azeez as Kittuni
- Narayanankutty as Hamsa
- Yamuna as Prof. Malini
- Mahima as Omana

== Release and reception ==
After release, a film critic from indiainfo.com noted that "It has a creditable screenplay which develops the vendetta plot convincingly". In December 2000, the film was dubbed and released in Tamil as Manthira Kottai to make most of Vikram's newfound fame following the success of Sethu (1999).
