= Anbu (2003 film) =

- DVD cover
- Directed by: Dalapathiraj
- Written by: N. Prasannakumar (dialogues)
- Screenplay by: Ln. Udhayakumar
- Story by: Ln. Udhayakumar
- Produced by: Udhayageetha
- Starring: Bala; Deepu; Vadivelu
- Cinematography: Nithyanandham
- Edited by: J. N. Harsha; S. Sathish
- Music by: Vidyasagar
- Production company: Udhayageetha Cine Creations
- Release date: 6 February 2003
- Running time: 140 minutes
- Country: India
- Language: Tamil

Anbu (transl. Affection) is a 2003 Indian Tamil-language romantic comedy drama film written and directed by Dalapathiraj. The film starred Bala and Deepu in the leading roles. It performed below average at the box office.

== Plot ==
Anbu, son of a politician Karuppiah, and Veena are lovers, but fate plays villain and the lovers are separated. Veena is from another caste and Anbu’s father is against their marriage. So Veena’s mother gets her married to Adithya (Adithya) in Anbu's absence. Anbu in the meantime goes abroad and when he returns, he is shocked to hear the news about Veena's wedding. He rushes to Ooty with Subbiah, where Veena is spending her honeymoon. Whether the lovers unite in the end forms the rest of this triangular love story.

== Cast ==
- Bala as Anbu
- Deepu as Veena
- Adithya as Adithya
- Vadivelu as Subbaiah
- Vijayakumar as Karuppaiah, Anbu's father
- Sarath Babu as Adithya's father
- Dhamu as Paari
- Abhinayashree as Rasiga
- Rekha as Veena's mother
- Jyothi as Anbu's mother
- Jaya Murali as Adithya's mother
- Singamuthu as Customer
- Halwa Vasu as Customer
- Bonda Mani as Customer
- Nellai Siva
- Kovai Senthil

== Soundtrack ==
The music was composed by Vidyasagar.

Song	Singers	Lyrics	Length
"Aval Yaaraval"	Karthik	Pa. Vijay	04:30
"Manapponnu Azhaga"	Dippu, Srivardhini	Na. Muthukumar	04:41
"Oththa Solluthan"	Anantha Raman	Arivumathi	05:08
"Sutti Payale"	Vasundhara Das, Tippu	Yugabharathi	04:27
"Thavamindri Kidaitha"	Sadhana Sargam, Hariharan	Thamarai	05:01
"Vannam Kalainthu"	Karthik	Palani Bharathi	05:06

== Reception ==
The Hindu wrote that the director "managed to present things in an entertaining fashion in spite of the familiar stories". Krishna Chidambaram of Kalki praised Vadivelu's comedy, Vidyasagar's music, story writer for having climax which breaks formula and director for making second half interesting but felt Sarathbabu, Vijayakumar and Rekha were underutilised and panned Bala's acting as amateur, dance choreography and director for testing patience in first half. Sify wrote "Udhayageetha Cine Creations that had produced a classy film like Thangar Bachchan’s Azhagi has come out with their second film Anbu which is far from entertaining. The film is in the same genre as the Raj Kapoor classic Sangam and K.Bhagyaraj’s Antha Ezhu Naatkal".

Deepu went on to star in Nee Mattum (2004) also starring Vadivelu.
