= Pramod-Pappan =

Indian film director duo

- Occupations: Director, Screenwriter
- Years active: 2002 - present

Pramod-Pappan are Indian screenwriter and film director duo. They started film direction with Vajram (2004), in which Mammootty played the lead role. They directed films such as Thaskaraveeran (2005), Abraham & Lincoln (2007), Mussafir (2013), Black Stallion (2009) and Bangkok Summer (2011).

== Career ==
Pramod and Pappan are brothers. Both of them started as entrepreneurs with the brandname "Lensman".

Pramod, who was a photographer, was a friend of writer and director, A. K. Lohithadas. This friendship lead to Pramod's debut as still photographer in the film Joker (2000 film). Pramod-Pappan as a duo directed a few albums. Later, Pramod-Pappan made their directional debut with the Malayalam film, Vajram (2004 film).

Pramod-Pappan's second directional venture was Thaskaraveeran (2005 film) starring Mammootty and Nayanthara.

The brothers later directed a few more films, Musafir being the last. The duo came back as executive producers in upcoming movie Velleppam. They are also running a celebrity event management named "Pramod-Pappan Star Marshall".

== Filmography ==
=== As director ===
Year	Film	Cast
2004	Vajram	Mammootty, Nandini
2005	Thaskaraveeran	Mammootty, Nayanthara
2007	Abraham & Lincoln	Kalabhavan Mani, Rahman
2009	Black Stallion	Kalabhavan Mani, Bala
2011	Bangkok Summer	Unni Mukundan, Richa Panai
2013	Mussafir	Rahman, Mamta Mohandas, Bala
