= Sneha Paliyeri =

Indian dubbing artist

- Born: Sneha M
- Occupations: Voice artist, Actress
- Awards: Kerala State Film Award for Best Dubbing Artist in 2017 for Eeda, 2018 Lilli

Sneha Paliyeri also known as Sneha M is a dubbing artist (voice artist) in Malayalam films. She is also a film actress, stage performer, theatre artist and professionally a teacher. She was born in Kannur, a district of Kerala. Her parents, Padmanabhan and Jayanthi, are both teachers. She married Naveen Kumar. She is a post-graduate in physics and a BEd

== Career ==
Paliyeri participated in the youth festival venues of the Kannur University Interzone Youth Festival, with mono act performance for seven years. She also acted in several plays. She appeared in the films Kavi Uddheshichathu..? directed by Thomas Kutty, Vellam directed by Prajesh Sen, and Thuramukham (2020) directed by Rajeev Ravi.She also appeared in webseries titled Instagraamam.

== Filmography ==
As dubbing artist

Year	Film	Actress
2017	Eeda	Nimisha Sajayan
2018	Lilly	Samyuktha Menon
2019	Marconi Mathai	Athmiya Rajan
2019	Pranaya Meenukalude Kadal	Riddhi Kumar
2019	Ambili	Tanvi Ram
2020	Kappela	Tanvi Ram

== Accolades ==
Award	Year	Film	For	Ref.
Kerala State Film Award for Best Dubbing Artist	2017	Eeda	Nimisha Sajayan	
Kerala State Film Award for Best Dubbing Artist	2018	Lilly	Samyuktha Menon	
