= Musafir (2013 film) =

- Directed by: Pramod Pappan
- Written by: Babu Janardhanan
- Produced by: Sunir Hamsa
- Starring: Rahman; Mamta Mohandas; Bala
- Cinematography: Shoukath Lensman
- Edited by: M. P. V. Ramana
- Music by: Songs: M. G. Radhakrishnan; Balabhaskar; Ouseppachan; Background Score: Ouseppachan
- Production company: Indis Creations
- Release date: 10 May 2013
- Running time: 135 minutes
- Country: India
- Language: Malayalam

Musafir (English: traveler) is a 2013 Malayalam language action-drama film directed by Pramod Pappan, starring Rahman, Mamta Mohandas, and Bala. It was shot in Bangkok, Dubai, and London.

The film was initially slated for release in 2009 but was delayed for unknown reasons. The shooting of this movie was completed on 2010, and it was released on 10 May 2013.

== Plot ==
Anupama is the owner of a multi-million business called Parvana Group. She meets a guy named Humayun who is a musician and is looking for a job. Anupama employs him soon they become friends. One day, she discovers that her brand and business have been transferred to someone. She sues the new company and finds out that it is now owned by Musafair. Musafir was living under the identity of Humayun to fall in love with her and steal her property. He is a criminal who is under the watch of Interpol. Musafir later reveals to Anupama that he was doing everything for her colleague, Sakthi, to whom he handed over all her wealth. Anupama gives him a counteroffer that if he manages to get her back everything he took away, she will pay him well.

Musafir talks to Sakthi about it which Sakthi denies. He kidnaps Sakthi and locks him in a hotel room. He then brings Anupama to the room but they find Sakthi dead. Musafir gets to know that Anupama's advocate, Menon, killed Sakthi from the CCTV visuals. Adv. Menon kidnaps Anupama and tells Musafir that he will give her back if Musafir hands over the CCTV visuals. Musafir hands over the hard drive with visuals to Adv. Menon and he releases Anupama. By that time, police arrive on the scene as Musafir gave a copy of the visuals to the police prior to the meeting. In the mayhem that follows, Adv. Menon shoots Anupama but Musafir stands in the way, thereby getting shot and killed. Adv. Menon gets killed by the police in retaliation.

== Cast ==
- Rahman as Humayun/Musafir
- Mamta Mohandas as Anupama Gopalakrishnan Nair/Business Magnet
- Bala as Sakthi
- Divya Unni as herself (Cameo appearance)
- Cochin Haneefa as GK / Gopalakrishnan Nair
- Mamukkoya as Kunjahamed
- P. Sreekumar as Adv. Menon / Ahaa Dude

== Soundtrack ==
- "Eakayay (female)" – Shweta Mohan
- "Kaivala" – Karthik
- "Pathinaalam" – Nincy
- "Muzafir" – Franko, Balu
- "Eakannay Thedunnu" – Ouseppachan
- "Fusion" – Ouseppachan
