= Rakshakan =

2007 Malayalam movie

- Directed by: Thulasidas
- Written by: A. K. Santhosh
- Screenplay by: A. K. Santhosh
- Produced by: G.K. Pilla (Saami)
- Starring: Kalabhavan Mani
- Cinematography: Utpal V. Nayanar
- Edited by: P. C Mohanan
- Music by: Sanjeev Lal; Rajeev Alunkal (lyrics)
- Release date: 24 August 2007
- Country: India
- Language: Malayalam

Rakshakan is a 2007 Indian Malayalam language action thriller film, directed by Thulasidas, written by A. K. Santhosh, starring Kalabhavan Mani, Ashish Vidyarthi, Riyaz Khan, Jagathy Sreekumar, Suraj Venjaramoodu and Harisree Ashokan in the lead roles.

== Plot synopsis ==
Mukundan faces many challenges when he has to solve all his financial liabilities just with the income he gets by running a garage.

== Cast ==
- Kalabhavan Mani as Mechanic Mukundan
- Ashish Vidyarthi as CI Sugathan (voiceover by Shobi Thilakan)
- Riyaz Khan as Vedimaram Zakeer
- Sai Kumar as Professor Narendran
- Jagathy Sreekumar as SI Karvaran/Krishnankutty
- Harisree Ashokan as Podimon
- Suraj Venjaramoodu as Kusumakumar
- Manya as Aswathy Bhaskar
- K. P. A. C. Lalitha as Lathika
- Suja Karthika as Indu
- Bindu Panicker as Dr. Arundhati Narendran
- Geetha Salam as Lopez
- Abu Salim as Varghese
- Manuraj as Manoj
- Jayakrishnan Kichu as Sreekuttan
- Jisna Ali as Heera Vishwanath
- Kalasala Babu as Bhaskaran
- Poornima Anand
- M. B. Padmakumar as Vijayan
