= Shakespeare M.A. Malayalam =

- ഷേക്സ്പിയർ എം.എ. മലയാളം
- Directed by: Shyju & Shaji
- Written by: Jiju Asokan
- Produced by: T. B. Raghunathan; K. K. Narayanadas; Saseendra Varma
- Starring: Jayasurya; Kalabhavan Mani; Roma
- Cinematography: Jibu Jacob
- Edited by: V. Sajan
- Music by: Mohan Sithara
- Release date: 19 May 2008
- Country: India
- Language: Malayalam

Shakespeare M.A. Malayalam is a 2008 Indian Malayalam-language film by the director duo Shyju and Shaji (in their directorial debut). The main cast of the film include Jayasurya, Kalabhavan Mani, Roma and Salim Kumar.

== Plot ==
Pavithran is a story writer for the stage plays of Jayabharathy Theaters. Pavithran is also known as 'Shakespeare' because he of his writing abilities. Kottayam Gopalan, who runs Jayabharathy Theaters, likes him because all his scripts are super hit and always earn him awards.

Once Gopalan makes Pavithran go to a remote village to write a play based on the life of the villagers there. Pavithran comes across Alli, a young country girl who is having a life of debt. Alli impresses him as a character and he sets out seeking to know her story. This forms the rest of the plot of this movie.

Pavithran has a dramatic view of Alli's life and attempts to change her life according to his imagination. He prompts Alli to love the son of the doctor, for whom she is a domestic help. Alli's brother ran away from home long back, taking money from the villagers. Due to this, Alli and the rest of the family is being troubled by the villagers who were cheated by Alli's brother. Towards the end, when Alli's house was to be mortgaged by the bank, the doctor offers a job for Alli in Bangalore. Alli readily accepts it and goes to Bangalore, asking her sister to inform Pavithran, who had already fallen in love with Alli by now. At her house, Pavithran saw her father finishing off the debts upon his family from the money Alli sent, and the family soon becoming well-off. Alli's brother also returns to the family and they all start living a fairly luxurious life.

Since her family was uncooperative towards him, Pavithran goes to Bangalore to find out Alli. After months, Pavithran goes to a hospital and is shocked to see Alli there and realise Alli was pregnant. Angrily, Pavithran goes to the doctor and violently asks him what had happened to Alli. The doctor, after being released from Pavithran's grip, tells him that when they had come to Bangalore, the doctor had taken Alli to a childless couple. The doctor then reveals the job he had in his mind for Alli, was being a surrogate mother to the couple. Hearing the news however, Alli faints, but later accepts her job. Meanwhile, Alli's family somehow had come to know of what she has been up to, and had stormed into the hospital, and, forgetting all the benefits that came to the family from her, they shower curses on her and disown her.

Right then, a nurse comes in the room and tells the doctor that Alli is having labour pain. After she gives birth, the couple enters and replaces the infant with a suitcase full of money. Pavithran waits until Alli regains consciousness. But instead of being happy about the money, Alli has a quarrel with Pavithran and ends up throwing the suitcase to Pavithran. Pavithran politely leaves. Angrily and desperately, Alli tries to commit suicide. The scene then cuts to the drama being played out on stage, which shows the rest of Alli's life: Alli is saved and she and Pavithran begins a new life. The drama on stage ends to thundering applause and the camera pans to the audience and Pavithran and Alli are seen watching the drama together. The clips of that woodhouse and fields all are shot from a beautiful and holy greenary place named "Vettikkadavu" a village in Kerala-Kizhhor which is located in kunnamkulam in Thrissur district.

== Cast ==
- Jayasurya as 'Shakespeare' Pavithran
- Kalabhavan Mani as Kottayam Gopalan
- Innocent as Mathanoor Avarachan
- Roma as Alli
- Jagathy Sreekumar as Thoothukudi Thulasidas
- Salim Kumar as Sugunan Moothukunnam
- Suraj Venjaramood as Chalayangad Joshi (Junior O.N.V.)
- Rajan P. Dev as Veerabhasan(Bhaskaran)
- Anoop Chandran as Manu Mohanan
- Biju Kuttan as Moti
- Nisha Sarangh as Komala Thodupuzha (Komala Touch River)
- Ambika Mohan as Pavithran's mother
- Ponnamma Babu as K.T.C Omana
- Vishnu Prakash as Alli's father
- Boban Alummoodan as Alli's brother
- Deepika Mohan as Alli's mother
- Sai Kumar as Doctor
- Urmila Unni
- Jayakrishnan Kichu
- Dinesh Panicker
- Arun Narayan as Pavithran in drama
- Shafna as Alli in Drama
- A. K. Lohithadas as himself

== Soundtrack ==
The film's soundtrack contains five songs, all composed by Mohan Sithara. Lyrics by Anil Panachooran, Engandiyoor Chandrasekharan.

#	Title	Singer(s)
1	"Akkam Pakkam"	Vineeth Sreenivasan, Sheela Mani,
2	"Akkam Pakkam [F]"	Shweta Mohan
3	"Neram Poy"	Afsal, Mohan Sithara, Mahadevan
4	"Vedana Paakum"	Madhu Balakrishnan
5	"Yavanika"	Dr. Satheesh Bhatt, Vidya

== Reception ==
A critic from Sify rated the film 2/5 stars and wrote, "Debutant directors, Shyju-Shaji's Shakespeare M.A has a great first half as it makes you laugh and is thoroughly enjoyable".
