= Sreekala Sasidharan =

Indian actress

- Born: Cherukunnu, Kannur, Kerala, India
- Other name: Sree
- Education: S. N. College, Kannur, B.A.
- Occupation: Actress
- Years active: 2004–2014; 2016-present
- Spouse: Vipin Kuttikkara (m. 2012)
- Relatives: Reshmi Boban

Sreekala Sasidharan is an Indian actress who predominantly works in Malayalam television serials.

== Early and personal life ==
Sreekala was born in Cherukunnu in Kannur district of Kerala to Sasidharan and Geetha. She has an elder sister, Sreejaya. She was trained in Classical dance, Ottamthullal, Kathakali and music since childhood. She has done her degree in Bachelor of Arts from S. N. College, Kannur and is a former university Kalathilakam.

She married her longtime boyfriend Vipin Kuttikara in 2012. They have a son and a daughter.

== Career ==
Sreekala made her debut through the serial Kayamkulam Kochunni and later acted in supporting roles in several serials before she became popular through her character of Sophie in the Malayalam serial Ente Manasaputri, which was one of the top-rated serials in Malayalam television. Her other well known serials include Snehatheeram, Ammamanasu, Ulladakkam, Devimahatmyam and Amma. In 2013, she made her Tamil debut the through the serial Aval. She took a break post her marriage. In 2016, she made a comeback through the serial Rathrimazha. She has acted in more than 40 television serials. She also has acted in few films, albums and advertisements.

== Filmography ==
| Year | Film | Role | Notes | Ref. |
|---|---|---|---|---|
| 2006 | Ennittum | College Student | | |
| 2007 | Rathri Mazha | Nandhini | | |
| 2009 | Makante Achan | Herself | Archive footage Uncredited role | |
| 2010 | Kaaryasthan | Herself | Cameo Appearance | |
| 2011 | Urumi | Aima | | |
| 2013 | Nadodimannan | Deepa Vinyachandran | | |
| 2015 | Thinkal Muthal Velli Vare | Herself | Cameo Appearance | |

== Television ==
=== Serials (Partial) ===
- All serials are in Malayalam unless noted otherwise.

| Year | Show | Role | Channel | Notes | Ref. |
|---|---|---|---|---|---|
| 2004 | Kayamkulam Kochunni | Nabisu | Surya TV | | |
| 2004 | Vikramadhithyan | Bhadrakali | Asianet | | |
| 2004 | Ramanan | | Surya TV | | |
| 2005 | Orma | Sayana | Asianet | | |
| 2005 | Krishna Kripa Sagaram | Devaki | Amrita TV | | |
| 2006 | Amma Manasu | Marina | Asianet | | |
| 2006 | Meera | Nirmala | Asianet | | |
| 2006 | Kaana Kinavu | Nimmi | Surya TV | | |
| 2006 | Vellankanni Mathavu | Anna | Surya TV | | |
| 2006 | Veendum Jwalaayi | Aleena | DD Malayalam | | |
| 2006 | Thulabharam | Bhagya | Asianet | | |
| 2006 | Swami Ayyappan | | Asianet | | |
| 2007 | Punarjanmam | Sophie | Surya TV | | |
| 2007-2010 | Ente Manasaputhri | Sophie | Asianet | | |
| 2009 | Sree Mahabhagavatam | Rukmini | Asianet | | |
| 2009 | Ulladakom | Uthara | Amrita TV | | |
| 2009 | Sreekrishna Leela | | Asianet | | |
| 2010 | Suryakanthi | | Kairali TV | | |
| 2010 | Devimahatmyam | Seethalakshmi | Asianet | | |
| 2010 | Parayi Petta Panthirukulam | Karaikkal Ammaiyar | Surya TV | | |
| 2010 | Swami Ayyappan Saranam | Urmila | Asianet | | |
| 2010 | Manjal Prasadam | | Green TV | | |
| 2010 | Snehatheeram | Ganga | Surya TV | | |
| 2011-2014 | Amma | Lakshmi | Asianet | | |
| 2011-2012 | Aval | Shalini | Star Vijay | Tamil serial | |
| 2012 | Mangalyapattu | | Kairali TV | | |
| 2016-2018 | Rathrimazha | Archana/Alice/Suja | Flowers TV | | |
| 2018 | Mizhineerppoovu | Maya | ACV | | |
| 2018-2019 | Alliyambal | Deepa | Zee Keralam | | |
| 2019 | Sabarimala Swami Ayyapan | Parvati Devi | Asianet | | |
| 2023-2024 | Balanum Ramayum | Rama | Mazhavil Manorama | | |
| 2024-2025 | Valsalyam | Nandhini | Zee Keralam | | |
| 2025 | Durga | Vasundhara | Zee Keralam | Cameo Appearance | |
| 2026 | Dheera 2 | Mayamma | DD Malayalam | | |

=== TV shows ===
- Bhagyavaram (Amrita TV) - Host
- Priya Geethangal (City Channel) - Host
- Chithrageetham - Host
- Annie's Kitchen
- Onnum Onnum Moonu
- Varthaprabhatham
- Comedy Stars
- Comedy Super Nite
- Sarigama
- Swantham Manasaputhri Sreekala
- Flowers Oru Kodi as Contestant
- 2010- Pappayum 12 Nakshathrangalum (Asianet)

== Albums ==
- Sreeramamantharam
- Nandagopalam
- Koithulsavam
- Ambilikannan
