= Black Stallion (film) =

- Directed by: Pramod Pappan
- Written by: Rajesh Jayaraman
- Produced by: Jagadeesh Chandran
- Starring: Kalabhavan Mani; Bala; Namitha; Ashish Vidyarthi; Rajan P. Dev
- Cinematography: Pramod Pappan
- Edited by: Zian Sreekanth
- Music by: Songs: Berny-Ignatius; Abhishek; Background Score: Ousepachan
- Production company: Kichu Films
- Release date: 8 January 2010
- Running time: 128 minutes
- Country: India
- Language: Malayalam

Black Stallion is a 2010 Malayalam erotic action-thriller film directed by Pramod Pappan and written by Rajesh Jayaraman. The film was produced by Jagadeesh Chandran and featuring Kalabhavan Mani, Bala and Namitha play the lead roles in this film. This is Namitha's first film in Malayalam. The film received a lot of negative reviews from the audience, criticizing the film's direction, story, dialogues, music, editing, cinematography and cast performances. The film was dubbed in Tamil as Nil Gavani.

== Plot ==
Black Stallion film starts from Irumban John, a dreaded don who terrorizes the town of Tirupur. His partner is the local cop Dominic Nadar who betrays him and his friend Nazer Hussain and he makes Nazer to kill John in a market fight where Dominic kills Nazer. John's son witnesses the crime. He tries to kill Dominic but it fails. He is taken to the juvenile jail and grows up to be another "Criminal Police" called Black. Later, he takes revenge by killing Nadar and soon becomes a notorious "thug in uniform". His catchphrase is "Clinjo". Laura is a bar dancer, and Black falls for her and tries forcibly to make her, but she stabs him and runs away to Kochi along with her challenged sister Sara.

In Kochi, she falls for the charms of a magazine photographer Ameer Usman and is soon madly in love with him. However, abhiram and his men are after her blood, and she is on the run. Now there is a twist in the tale as Ameer turns out to be the villain with the smiling cheek. Black was actually trying to save Laura from Ameer, who was actually a known pimp. He wants to sell Laura to rich foreigners. In the end, Black kills Ameer and wins Laura.

== Cast ==
- Kalabhavan Mani as CI Black Stallion / Clinjo
- Bala as Ameer Usman
- Namitha as Laura
- Ashish Vidhyarthi as Irumban John
- Rajan P. Dev as DSP Sebastian Zacharia IPS
- Jayan Cherthala as Gauri
- Augustine as George Kichappilly / Achayan
- Narayanankutty
- Mahadevan as Dominic Nadar IPS
- Besant Ravi as Nagaappan
- Kiran Raj
- Pawan as Perumal
- Kannan Pattambi as Kollam Dasari

== Soundtrack ==
Songs:

- "The Sexy Lady"
