= Thanthonni =

- Theatrical release poster
- Directed by: George Varghese
- Written by: T A Shahid
- Produced by: Shahul Hameed Marikar
- Starring: Prithviraj Sukumaran
- Cinematography: Sajeth Menon
- Edited by: Bijith Bala
- Music by: Songs: Thej Mervin; Score: Gopi Sundar
- Production company: Marikar Films
- Distributed by: Marikar Films Release
- Release date: 18 March 2010
- Running time: 155 minutes
- Country: India
- Language: Malayalam

Thanthonni (transl. Rebel) is a 2010 Indian Malayalam-language action thriller film directed by George Varghese (in his directorial debut). Thanthonni stars Prithviraj Sukumaran, Sheela Kaur, Ambika, Sai Kumar, Captain Raju, Vijayaraghavan and Suraj Venjaramood.

It was released on 18 March 2010.

== Plot ==
Kochukunju is the youngest spoiled and drunkard son of the Vadakkanveettil Tharavadu in Taliparambu, Kannur. He is the son of Katrina, the youngest and only daughter of the Vaadakkanveetil Tharavadu, who got pregnant with Kochukunju from a wandering stage artist Daveed Lopez out of wedlock (though they later married). David is presumed to be dead. It is revealed that David is still alive and Kochukunju knows the whereabouts of both his dad and Neelan, the killer who spared his dad. His dad promises him to return one day.

Kochukunju is hated by everyone in his family, except the one who is aware of his honesty, his younger uncle and his cousin-fiancée Helen, because they want to divide the Vadakkan Veetil property and engage in some business and he is a barrier for them. His cousin Nelson, a criminal lawyer, engages in a brawl in a hotel fights and the opponent accidentally stabs himself to death instead of stabbing Nelson. Soon. he realizes that it is Kochukunju's hotel and he is not what he seems to be. Kochukunju has become a powerful and extremely wealthy businessman and owns a lot of property. Kochukunju is about to take blame for Nelson as he did in childhood, but is stopped by his friend and his Manager Nandan, who takes the blame instead. Kochukunju fights for Nandan in court. His cousin comes home and confesses to Katrina that Kochukunju is not what he seems to be and the tears she has shed for many years have not gone to waste as he turns out to be good. He also confesses to the theft he did years back. His mother and younger uncle trick him into going to a de-addiction center, where he makes the owner and doctor, a person who was against alcohol, drink. He says he doesn't need rehabilitation and will stop if his mother tells him so. In the jail, Nandan is beaten up by three rogues who nearly kills him, leading to his hospitalization. He stops Kochukunju from retaliating.

One day, when Helen went to a wind mill area for some pictures there, the caretaker said that she can't do them without the permission of their owner and reveals that all the wind mills in that area is owned by a single person and she meets Kochukunju there, who is revealed to be the owner and she urges him to tell all, where the flashback of the three rogues is revealed and says how he met his father one day and promised that he won't fail in front his family who hates him. He goes to Dubai and works in a fish market where he met Nandan. They both become good friends. One day, Kochukunju saves Hafis Ali Ibrahim who is a do-gooder wealthy businessman for the people of Dubai from an accident and becomes his right hand, while his three sons are revealed to be the rogues. Hafees trusts him more than his sons and he puts all his wealth in Kochukunju's name, helped by his lawyer Anand Sharma. The sons kill the father and put the blame on Kochukunju, who is spared after proving his innocence. The sons get jailed in a weapon smuggling case in Tamil Nadu. Kochukunju is waiting for the day they come out and he can hand them their property. But when they come out, they kill Anand and Kochukunju decide to kill them. Kochukunju goes to Dubai and kills them in a desert after a fight. Kochukunju then returns to Kerala.

His brothers try to kill him by sending out a rogue, who is defeated and the truth is brought out. They did it for the property. He tells them to take whatever they want and that he does not need a penny, except for his mother and Helen. The day arrives when the property is divided, and a stranger buys some of their property. The person is a proxy and the real owner then comes out. He introduces himself as Daveed and everyone is shocked. He tells them he did not come for their money or wealth, the only one with the right to it is Kochukunju. He reveals that Kochukunju is the real owner who bought all the property and is not the loser that they think he is. He had acted in front of them for this long, but became a successful businessman. He also says that Katrina's brothers sent out a man to kill him. Her brothers ask for forgiveness.

He comes to their room where his photo is displayed with a lit candle. Kochukunju is happy as his father is back now and, with his mother's permission, blows out the candle that was kept burning in remembrance of David. His mother gives him a light slap for hiding the truth for so long and the family of Kochukunju, his parents and Helen is united.

== Cast ==
- Prithviraj Sukumaran as Vadakkanveettil Kochukunju
  - Shane Nigam as Young Kochukunju
- Sheela Kaur as Helen Varghese
- Suraj Venjaramood as Achu
- Sai Kumar as David Lopez, Katrina's husband and Kochukunju's father
- Ambika as Vadakanveetil Katrina, David's wife and Kochukunju's mother
  - Neethu S Nair as Youn Katrina
- Captain Raju as Vadakkanveettil Kurien “Kuriachen”, Kochu Kunju's elder uncle
- Vijayaraghavan in a dual role as :
  - Vadakkanveettil Kochouseppu
  - Vadakkanveettil Thankachen, Kochukunju's third uncle
- Suresh Krishna as Adv. Nelson, Kochukunju's cousin
- Ramu as Vadakkanveettil Thomas “Thomachen”, Kochukunju's Second uncle
- Jagannatha Varma as Fr. Stephen Chandy
- Jagathy Sreekumar as Dr. Thomas Vaidyan
- Baburaj as Appakkattil Ummachan
- Saju Attingal as Appakkattil Pappachan
- Mahadevan as Hafees Ali Ibrahim
- P. Vasu as Adv. Anand Sharma
- Sadiq as S.P Alex Vadakkanveettil Thomas, Thomachen's son
- Ranjith as Neelakandan
- Sudheesh as Nandan
- Lakshmi Priya as Alice
- Meghanathan as SI R. Ganeshan
- Anil Murali as Transport Minister Joseph Kurian, Kuriachen's son
- Kulappulli Leela as Achu's mother
- Bindu Panicker as Mercy
- Adithya Menon as Anwar Ali Ibrahim, Hafees's son
- Kalabhavan Abi as Ameer Ali Ibrahim, Hafees's son
- Viji Thambi as Ramalinga Chettiyar
- Shivaji Guruvayoor as Advocate Charlie
- Tony as Mathews
- Kollam Ajith as Varkey
- Murali Menon as Boban
- Abu Salim as Vincent
- Santhosh Sasidharan as Binoy
- Abraham Koshy as Kumaravel
- Majeed as Dr. Prasad
- Adinad Sasi as Shankaran
- Kanya Bharathi as Shoshanna
- Nimisha Unnikrishnan as Susan Thomas
- Kavitha as Jaicy
- Jolly Isho as Eliyamma

== Music ==
Thanthonni

Soundtrack album by Thej Mervin
- Released: March 2010
- Recorded: March 2010
- Genre: Feature film soundtrack
- Length: 22:19
- Language: Malayalam
- Label: Satyam Audio

Official audio
- Thanthonni- Full Album on YouTube

Music was composed by Thej Mervin, with lyrics written by Gireesh Puthenchery and T. A. Shahid.

Track listing
No.	Title	Lyrics	Music	Singer(s)	Length
1.	""Aakaashamariyaathe""	Gireesh Puthenchery	Thej Mervin	K. J. Yesudas	4:28
2.	""Kaattu Paranjathum""	T. A. Shahid	Thej Mervin	Prithviraj	5:22
3.	""Kaattu Paranjathum""	T. A. Shahid	Thej Mervin	K. P. Udayabhanu	5:21
4.	""Periya Thevare""	Gireesh Puthenchery	Thej Mervin	Sayanora Philip, Shankar Mahadevan	4:57
5.	""Thaanthonni" (Theme)"	T. A. Shahid	Thej Mervin	Franco	1:57
Total length:					22:19

== Production ==
Shooting for the film started on 6 November 2009. The main locations were Kochi, Ottapalam, Pollachi and Dubai. The film wrapped up shooting by mid-January, 2010 and started post production.

== Release ==
The film was released on 18 March 2010.

== Reception ==
The New Indian Express wrote that "The film could have been much watchable had it not been for the shoddy overplay and second-rate execution" Sify.com wrote that "It has been made as per certain age old formulas which could have been fine some two decades back. If you are the kind who regards a mixture of buffoonery, fights and some heroism as the perfect recipe for entertainment, this one could turn out to be a not-so-bad effort. For the rest of the world, watch it at your own risk". Paresh C Palicha from Rediff wrote that "Thanthonni may have been an ambitious project for Prithviraj and the debutant director George Varghese. But the oft- repeated storyline and lack of novelty in presentation gives the film a jaded look"
