= Chempada =

- Directed by: Robin Thirumala
- Screenplay by: Robin Thirumala
- Based on: Avar Nagarathilund by M. D. Ajayaghosh
- Produced by: Jagadish K. Nair; Abdul Azeez
- Starring: Bala; Sridevika
- Cinematography: Noushad Shereef
- Music by: Musafir
- Production company: Garden Films
- Release date: December 2008
- Country: India
- Language: Malayalam

Chempada (English: Red Army) is a 2008 Malayalam language thriller film written and directed by Robin Thirumala in his directorial debut. The film is based on the novel Avar Nagarathilund by M. D. Ajayaghosh which was serialised in Manorama Weekly.

== Plot ==
The film revolves around a music troupe of youngsters named 'Red Army'. Headed by its mentor Captain Mukundan Menon, the group's real operations are to loot and kill people who have amassed wealth through wrong means and to cleanse the world of crime and injustice. Manu (Bala), a naive guy from Vagamon and son of a driver working for R. K. Nair, a rich planter, loved Meenakshi (Sreedevika), an innocent girl. But Meenakshi was raped by the planter and his accomplices. Being loyal to the master, Manu's father took the blame upon himself and got arrested. Things took a different turn when his father committed suicide in jail under suspicious circumstances and Meenakshi went missing. Manu then took up arms to avenge R. K. Nair and his men, but was beaten and left badly wounded in a desolate place, where he was found by the troupe members. Manu, who is later inducted into the troupe, gets a new name, Harikrishnan, and becomes active in the troupe's activities. What happens next forms the rest of the movie.

== Cast ==
- Bala as Manu/Harikrishnan
- Sridevika as Meenakshi/Bhadra
- Lakshana as Reshmi
- Kochunni Prakash as Richard
- Tosh Christy as Roy
- Anu Anand
- Ronson Vincent as Ashokan
- John Jacob as Gomez
- K. B. Ganesh Kumar as A.S.P Ravishankar
- Govind as Akash Nair
- Baburaj as Merkariyoz
- Nisha Sarang as Lekha
- Sadiq as Paily
- Dominic Chittatt as Anirudha Varma
- Aravind Akash as Freddy (Cameo Appearance)
- Robin A Thirumala as News Reporter (Cameo Appearance)

== Soundtrack ==
The film's soundtrack contains 10 songs, all composed by Musafir. Lyrics were by Robin Thirumala, Prakash Marar, Firoz Thikkodi.

#	Title	Singer(s)
1	"Ente Pranayathin" (D)	Najim Arshad, Jyotsna
2	"Ente Pranayathin" (M)	Najim Arshad
3	"Kallurukkippoovu Kammalaninja"	M. G. Sreekumar, Ranjini Jose
4	"Mele Etho Oru Minnaaminni"	Pradeep Palluruthy
5	"Mohabbathin Kadalile"	Jyotsna, Dr. M. K. Muneer
6	"Oru Paattaay"	Arun, Preetha Kannan
7	"Pathiye Vanna"	Cicily, Satheesh Babu
8	"Raavin Viralthumbil"	Najim Arshad, Smitha Nishanth
9	"Raavin Viralthumbil" (F)	Smitha Nishanth
10	"Thumbe Thumbe"	Afsal, Pradeep Palluruthy
