= Avan (2010 film) =

- A promotional still
- Directed by: Nandan Kavil
- Written by: Sumod-Gopu
- Produced by: Surya Narayanan M
- Starring: Bala; Vijay Yesudas; Muktha George
- Cinematography: K. P. Nambyathiri
- Edited by: K Sreenivas
- Music by: Songs: Anil Gopalan; Vijay Yesudas (1 song); Score: Rajamani
- Release date: 29 July 2010
- Country: India
- Language: Malayalam

Avan is a 2010 Indian Malayalam-language film directed by Nandan Kavil. Written by Sumod-Gopu, the film stars Bala, Vijay Yesudas and Muktha George. This film marks the debut of the popular South Indian playback singer Vijay Yesudas as an actor.

== Plot ==
Ramanujan is an established singer. The reality show named Crime And Music forms the backdrop of the story. The specialty of this reality show is that it features a number of convicts taking part in the competition. Krishnan is a goon who is a convict now and is also taking part in this competition. He develops a special relationship with Ramanujan, which leads to many unexpected twists in their lives.

== Cast ==
- Bala as Krishnan
- Vijay Yesudas as Ramanujan
- Riyaz Khan as Dharman
- Muktha George as Mallika
- Jagathy Sreekumar as CI Samkutty
- Anoop Chandran as 'Puli' Biju
- Kottayam Nazeer as Kurian Thomas
- Indrans as Nair
- Bindu Nair as Rosy
- Ambika Mohan
- Viswambharan
- Rizabawa as George Mathew
- Krishna

== Production ==
Due to the film's promotions, Vijay Yesudas was mistaken to be the hero of the film. Vijay plays a singer in the film and called his role an "extended guest role". As of April 2010, only the songs needed to be shot.

== Soundtrack ==
The songs were composed by Anil Gopalan. Ramesh Narayanan and Vijay Yesudas each composed a song each. Lyrics by O.S. Unni Krishnan.

- "Analakkannai" - K. J. Yesudas
- "Thozha En Thozha" - Vijay Yesudas
- "Vazhiyorathenno" - Vivekanandan, Swetha
- "Mayathe Nilppu" - Shankar Mahadevan
- "Shadamgurapura" - M. G. Sreekumar, Sudarsan
- "Agnijwalayay" - Vivekanandan, Suresh Vasudev
- "Poymaranjo" - Ramesh Narayanan (also composer)
- "Vazhiyorathenno" - Vishnu Krishnan, Athira
- "Orukunjukkattin" - Vijay Yesudas (also composer)
