= Bullet (2008 film) =

- Directed by: Nizar
- Produced by: Nazim Vellila
- Starring: Suresh Gopi; Kalabhavan Mani; Rajan P. Dev; Devan; Pavithra
- Cinematography: Anil Gopinath
- Production company: Malayil Movie International
- Release date: 2008
- Country: India
- Language: Malayalam

Bullet is a Malayalam language film directed by Nizar and produced by Nazim Vellila under the banner of Malayil Movie International. It was released in 2008. The film received negative reviews.

== Cast ==
- Suresh Gopi as Special Branch DYSP Kallampalli Manakkal Parasuramappatteri
- Kalabhavan Mani as Circle Inspector Wahid Abdul Rahiman Haji
- Rajan P. Dev as Ganga Prasad
- Devan as Yamuna Prasad
- Babu Namboothiri as Mahadevan
- Pavithra as Gayathri
- Udhayathara
- Jagathy Sreekumar
- Cochin Haneefa as Uttaman Vellayani
- Vijayaraghavan
- Sai Kumar
- Harisree Asokan
- Mamukkoya as Chandramani
- Indrans as Premasulal
- Innocent as Mahadevan
- Ponnamma Babu
- Ravishankar as Karthik
- Anoop Chandran
- Bijukuttan
- Sona
- Bala
- Maria Roy
- Kottayam Nazeer
