= Abraham & Lincoln =

- Directed by: Pramod Pappan
- Written by: Dennis Joseph
- Produced by: Fab Associates
- Starring: Kalabhavan Mani; Rahman; Shweta Menon; Neha Pendse
- Cinematography: Murali Raman
- Edited by: Don Max
- Music by: Ouseppachan
- Production company: Fab Associates
- Release date: 1 March 2007
- Running time: 140 minutes
- Country: India
- Language: Malayalam

Abraham & Lincoln is a 2007 Indian Malayalam language action-thriller film directed by Pramod Pappan and written by Dennis Joseph. The film stars Kalabhavan Mani and Rahman starring in the titular roles, with Shweta Menon, Neha Pendse, Anoop Menon, Bineesh Kodiyeri, Rajan P. Dev, Salim Kumar, and Baburaj in supporting roles. The film was inspired from the 2004 Hindi film, Dhoom. It is the first Malayalam film to use the Bullet time effect for its action sequences.

== Plot ==
The film starts by showing a gold smuggling syndicate named Sonar Kella. Sonar Kella's owner, Shankarnath, hires a bike racer to smuggle some gold, but on the way, the racer was killed by the henchmen of Sonar Kella's rival gang named Ravuther Group. Gangster Abraham, the bike racer's brother, investigates the death of his brother. Along the way, he discovers some shocking information that strengthens his determination to find his brother's killer. He becomes a hired thug and infiltrates the mafia. At the same time, Police Officer Lincoln, begins investigating the same mafia that Abraham has just joined. Lincoln suspects that they are to blame for ruining his brother's life. Abraham's life takes an unexpected turn as he joins forces with Lincoln in an effort to take the criminals down.

== Cast ==
- Kalabhavan Mani as Abraham Dominic.
- Rahman as SI. Lincoln George
- Anoop Menon as Collector Philip Mathew
- Dinesh Prabhakar as Constable
- Neha Pendse as Nancy
- Baburaj as Ameen
- Shwetha Menon as Lulu
- Bineesh Kodiyeri as Balu
- Kalabhavan Narayanankutty
- Kollam Thulasi as Balu's father
- Balachandran Chullikkadu as Chief Minister
- Salim Kumar as Constable Marcos
- Rajan P. Dev as Rawther, owner of Rawther Group
- TG Ravi as Minister Kottara Mathan
- Vimal Raj as Rawther Group's gunda leader
- Kiran Raj as Sonarkella Shankarnath's henchman
- Biyon as Ramu
- Sreejith Ravi as Usman
- Manu Mohith as 'Sonar Kella' Shankar Nath

== Soundtrack ==
The music album of the movie was composed by Ouseppachan. The lyrics were written by Balachandran Chullikkad.

Track	Song title	Singers
1	"Udurajamukhi" (Male)	Madhu Balakrishnan
2	"Udurajamukhi" (Female)	Manjari
3	"Kezhaman Kannale"	Kalabhavan Mani and Rimi Tomy, Madhu Balakrishnan (raga)
4	"Indrasabha"	Sayanora Philip
5	"Konbodu Kuzhalodu"	Balu, Franco Simon and Jyotsna Radhakrishnan
