= One Way Ticket (2008 film) =

- Directed by: Bipin Prabhakar
- Produced by: Gireesh Mylapravan /Gireesh Azhikode
- Starring: Prithviraj Sukumaran; Bhama
- Cinematography: Vipin Mohan
- Edited by: Ranjan Abraham
- Music by: Original Songs: Arun&Anoop(Twinz Chan); Rahul Raj; Background Score: Rajamani
- Release date: 20 June 2008
- Country: India
- Language: Malayalam
- Budget: 2,25,00,000/-

One Way Ticket is a 2008 Indian Malayalam-language film by Bipin Prabhakar starring Prithviraj Sukumaran and Bhama with Mammootty in a guest role.

== Plot ==
Kunjappu aka Jahangir is a jeep-driver who is a die-hard fan of Mammootty and also is the General Secretary of the Malappuram District unit of the Mammootty Fans’ Association. His family consists of his mother and three sisters, two of whom are married. They all want to see Kunjappu married and so a marriage-broker named Beeran is behind him in finding a match for Kunjappu.

Kunjappu has an uncle who keeps a distance from Kunjappu and his family. He has a young daughter called Sajira. To irritate this uncle, Kunjappu always goes about saying that he would marry only Sajira. The uncle takes it seriously and to prevent this from happening, he helps Beeran find more and more girls for Kunjappu, but he rejects all the proposals brought by Beeran.

In the meantime Kunjappu goes to attend a wedding and there he sees a girl called Raziya singing the Oppana. He tells his family that he is in love with Raziya, and that he intends to marry her. His uncle learns about this from Beeran and is happy. Preparations for the marriage begins. And then one day Kunjappu goes to Raziya's college to meet her. And there he learns that it Raziya is a different girl and the girl he fell in love was Sunanda. Sunanda has an uncle named Karunakaran Ezhuthachchan. He and his son Sasi intend to grab Sunanda's property and assets. Situations become worse from there and the 'Mega Star' Mammootty himself, had to intervene to solve the issues.

== Cast ==
- Prithviraj Sukumaran as Jehangir (Kunjappu)
- Bhama as Sunanda
- Thilakan as Karunakaran Ezhuthachan
- Balachandran Chullikadu as Balan Master
- Govindankutty
- Jaffar Idukki as Chandran
- Aniyappan as Murali
- Jagathy Sreekumar as Bava Haji
- Jagadish as Salahudeen
- Salim Kumar as Sakkath Beeran
- Tini Tom as Chandran
- Nishanth Sagar as Sasi
- Manianpilla Raju
- Sadiq as CI George Kurian
- Kalabhavan Prajod
- Radhika as Sajira
- Minu Kurian as Bava Haji's Wife
- Ambika Mohan as Gomathi, Sunanda's mother
- Maya Viswanath
- Lakshmi Priya as Zeenath
- Manjusha Sathish as Amina
- Deepika Mohan
- Bose Venkat as Sasi's henchman
- Mammootty as himself (Extended Cameo Appearance)
