= Sound of Boot =

2008 Indian film

- DVD cover
- Directed by: Shaji Kailas
- Written by: Rajesh Jayaraman
- Starring: Suresh Gopi; Murali; Bala; Honey Rose
- Cinematography: Raja Rathinam
- Edited by: Arun Kumar
- Music by: Ishaan Dev
- Production company: Sai-Meera Productions
- Release date: 8 February 2008 (Kerala)
- Country: India
- Language: Malayalam

Sound of Boot is a 2008 Indian Malayalam-language crime thriller film directed by Shaji Kailas and written by Rajesh Jayaraman. It stars Suresh Gopi, Bala, Honey Rose and Murali.

== Plot ==
The film begins with a scene taking place in the Kakkayam police camp when a police officer is seen assaulting a prisoner. The scene then shifts to the retirement ceremony of three police officers - DYSP Abdul Sathar, IG Raghavan Nambiar and ADGP Thomas Sebastian. Sathar is murdered on his way back home.

Holiday Home is a tourist resort in the high ranges of Kerala. It is frequented by tourists especially newly married couples who come for their honeymoon. Sankaranarayanan is the caretaker of the Holiday Home. Rahul Krishna comes to Holiday Home with his lover Meera Nambiar. The next day Meera Nambiar is found murdered, with SP Siddharth Mahadev being designated as the investigation officer. Everyone who is involved with the crime gives a different story to Siddharth.

The story later shifts back to the period when Indira Gandhi declared the state of emergency In India. The press was censored. The people who opposed the emergency were taken into preventive custody. Many police atrocities took place during that time. Sankaranarayanan was a local press baron. He and Anthony reported through the newspapers, the atrocities/rape faced by the female plantation workers due to the local police. Seeking revenge, Raghavan Nambiar, Abdul Sathar and Thomas Sebastian brutally torture Sankaranarayanan and rapes and kills Sankaranarayanan's wife and daughter and falsely implicate him in their murders. Sankaranarayanan reveals to Rahul that he is his son and they must take revenge against Nambiar, Sathar and Thomas Sebastian. Later Sathar retired from the police force as a DYSP, Nambiar retired as an IGP and Thomas Sebastin retired as an ADGP. Meera (Nambiar's daughter) is held captive by Sankaranarayanan. Rahul is against killing Meera since it was her father who had raped/murdered his sister and Meera must not be punished. Meera escapes the clutches of Sankaranarayanan with the help of Rahul. However while escaping Meera slips and hits a stone leading to her death.

Sankaranarayanan and Rahul murder Nambiar and Sathar but later Siddarth successfully arrests Shankaranarayanan when he attempted to attack Siddarth. When questioned, Shankaranarayanan revealed that his son Rahul would murder retired Thomas Sebastian. ADGP Vincent Cherian asks Siddarth to arrest Rahul also and to protect Thomas Sebastian at any cost since Thomas was a close relative of Cherian. The next day when Siddarth and Aravind visited Thomas Sebastian at his home a gang led by Rahul made an attempt to attack him, but their attempt was foiled due to the timely intervention of Siddarth and Aravind. The entire gang was arrested by the police officers. However Janaki murders Thomas Sebastian. It is later known that Janaki is married to Sankaranarayanan and that she had survived the rape and attack and she had been alive all this time as a Palmist.

== Cast ==
- Suresh Gopi as SP Siddharth Mahadev IPS, the investigating officer
- Murali as Sankaranarayanan
- Bala as Rahul Krishna (voiceover by Sarath Das)
- Krishnakumar as CI Aravind
- Bheeman Raghu as Retd ADGP Thomas Sebastian IPS
- Rizabawa as Retd DYSP Abdul Sathar
- Rajan P. Dev as Retd IG Raghavan Nambiar IPS
- Honey Rose as Meera Nambiar
- Sona Nair as Janaki
- Lakshana as Sofiya Hassan
- Sonia Bose Venkat as Bhadra
- Biju Pappan as George Abraham
- Maniyanpilla Raju as Antony
- T. P. Madhavan as IG Vincent Cherian IPS
- Sangeetha Mohan as Compere
- Chali Pala as Peter, Driver
- Bindu Panicker as Mathaji

== Reception ==
Rediff said that the film, "fairs a notch better than other recent outings of Suresh Gopi, because of the technical and scripting departments." On the contrary, a critic from Sify wrote, "Added to that there are no nuances, twists or turns, and no drama in this non-thriller, with only Suresh Gopi bringing some cheer to otherwise a film that will put you into a deep slumber!"
