= Namukku Paarkkuvan Munthirithoppukal =

Indian Malayalam TV series

- Genre: Drama; Romance
- Written by: Rajani
- Screenplay by: Rajani
- Story by: K.K.Sudhaakaran
- Directed by: Shaiju Sukesh
- Creative director: Senthil Kumar
- Starring: Jayakrishnan; Raksha Raj
- Theme music composer: Jaasigift
- Opening theme: "Oro Malarilum"
- Ending theme: "Thedum Ninne Ennume"
- Composer: Joyee Thamalam
- Country of origin: India
- Original language: Malayalam
- No. of seasons: 1
- No. of episodes: 74

Production
- Executive producer: Lalu Neyyatinkara
- Producer: B.Raghesh
- Production location: Uthamapalayam
- Cinematography: Manoj Kalagramam
- Animator: Shibu-Shivaganga
- Editor: Harimukham
- Camera setup: Multi-camera
- Running time: 20 - 25 Minutes

Original release
- Network: Surya TV
- Release: 22 June – 2 October 2020

Related
- Namukku Parkkan Munthirithoppukal

Nammukku Paarkkuvan Munthirithoppukal is an Indian Malayalam Television Series which aired on Surya TV and Streamed on Sun NXT from 22 June 2020 to 2 October 2020. The series is inspired from the novel Nammukku Gramangalil Chennu Rapparkkam by KK Sudhakaran.

== Plot ==
Solomon and Sophie fall in love with each other after a series of unfortunate events. Just when they dream of a life together, their love life faces many setbacks. These star-crossed lovers kept their love for each other against all odds. They overcome everything and fall in love again.

== Cast ==
- Jayakrishnan Kichu as Solamon
- Raksha Raj as Sofia
- Shobha Mohan as Reethamma
- Shobhi Thilakan
- Dinesh Panicker as Police Officer
- Sindhu Varma
- Kishore
- P. Sreekumar

== Title song ==
No.	Title	Lyrics	Music	Singers	Length
1.	"Oro Malarilum Oro Thalirilum" "ഓരോ മലരിലും ഓരോ തളിരിലും"	Joyee Thamalam	Jaasigift	Jaasigift	1:00
2.	"Mazhaye Mazhaye Nee Azhake" "മഴയേ മഴയേ നീ അഴകേ"	Emil Mohammed	Emil Muhammed	Rasszi Mustafa	6:03
Total length:					7:03
