= Balanum Ramayum =

Indian Malayalam language television series

- Genre: Drama
- Written by: Dinesh Pallath
- Screenplay by: Dinesh Pallath
- Directed by: Girish Konni
- Country of origin: India
- Original language: Malayalam
- No. of seasons: 1
- No. of episodes: 239

Production
- Producer: Mohandas
- Running time: 22 minutes
- Production company: Thazchayil Enterprise

Original release
- Network: Mazhavil Manorama; ManoramaMax
- Release: 10 April 2023 – 13 January 2024

Balanum Ramayum ( initially titled as Balarama) is an Indian television drama series. The series stars Sarath Das and Sreekala Sasidharan in the title role and aired on Mazhavil Manorama from 10 April 2023 to 13 January 2024 and digitally streams on ManoramaMax. Balan, a social worker, and Rama, a DTP operator, are a middle-aged couple in love. Amidst society's disapproving looks and family objections, they strive to be united.

== Cast ==
- Sarath Das
- Sreekala Sasidharan
- Vivek Gopan / Midhun Menon
- Jiffin George
- Krishnaprasad
- Sreelakshmi Haridas
- Ashwathy Prabha
- Omana Ouseph
- Preetha Pradeep
- Anoop Sivasenan
- V.K Baiju
- Rajini Chandy
- Parikshit RS
- Dileep Nair
- Kashiram Iyer
- Sundarapandian
- Santha Kumari
- Kottayam Rasheed
- Kavitha Lakshmi
- Souparnika Subhash
