= George Varghese (director) =

Indian film director

- Born: Kerala, India
- Occupation: Film Director

George Varghese is an Indian film director working in the Malayalam film industry.

== Career ==
Varghese started his career working as an assistant director to filmmakers like Joshiy, M. Padmakumar, Anil C Menon etc. He made his directorial debut in 2010 with the Prithviraj starrer Thanthonni.

== Filmography ==
- i.c.u (2013)
- Thanthonni (2010)
