= Cowboy (2013 film) =

- Theatrical Poster
- Directed by: P. Balachandra Kumar
- Written by: Dr. V. S. Sudhakaran Nair
- Produced by: K. Anil Mathew
- Starring: Asif Ali; Khushbu; Bala; Mythili; Master Pankaj Krisshna; Jagathy Sreekumar; Lena; Assim Jamal; Sai Kumar
- Cinematography: Sanjeev Shankar; Venugopal
- Edited by: Samjith Mohammed
- Music by: Berny-Ignatius; C. Rajamani
- Production company: Cine Castle Movie Kingdom
- Distributed by: Mary Matha Release
- Release date: 15 February 2013
- Running time: 134 minutes
- Country: India
- Language: Malayalam

Cowboy is a 2013 Malayalam-language thriller film directed by P. Balachandrakumar (in his directorial debut). starring Asif Ali, Khushbu and master Pankaj Krrishna in lead roles while Bala and Sai Kumar play the main antagonists and Mythili, Jagathy Sreekumar, Anoop Chandran and Indrans play supporting roles. The film is produced by K. Anil Mathew, and music is done by Benny Ignatious, and the background score is by Rajamani. The film is inspired by the 1995 Hollywood thriller Nick of Time. Cowboy released to a lukewarm critical reception and was a commercial failure. The film was released on 15 February 2013.

== Plot ==
Vinay lives in Kuala Lumpur, Malaysia, with his parents. His father is totally against him and his ways. Vinay runs a pub named 'Cowboy', which makes his father comment that he makes a living by shamelessly running a brothel. Vinay's sister Veena and brother-in-law Mohan, who also live in Kuala Lumpur, have no love for him.

Veena and Mohan are set to arrive from India. Their son Pankaj is in Malaysia, and Vinay gets set to take Pankaj to the airport in Mohan's expensive car, hands over the kid and the car to Veena and Mohan and come back. But on the way, Vinay is forced to chase and fight two guys who try to steal Pankaj's diamond necklace. Vinay, in action, is what catches the fancy of an Indian Police Officer Xavier, who happens to pass by. Xavier then takes Pankaj hostage and threatens to kill him if Vinay doesn't do what he wants him to do. Xavier wants Vinay to kill someone. He hands Vinay a gun and asks him to go to a hotel, where his target is. Xavier himself would be there, he is told. Vinay finds that his 'target' is Revathy Menon, the external affairs minister of India. But he finds out that the mastermind behind the conspiracy is actually Revathy's husband Rajashekhar when he and Krishna, Revathy's PA, go to her husband's room and he kills Krishna with the help of Xavier. On the day of the murder, Vinay slips into the minister's office by crossing Xavier's eyes and tells Revathy about the conspiracy occurring there (in the original version, it is the heroine that comes into the minister's room but will not tell the minister anything but will put a paper with all the details into the minister's speech file.) At the auditorium, Vinay expects that Revathy will not come to the auditorium. But shockingly, she turns up and having no choice, he aims the gun at her and waits for a while. Meanwhile, a man named Ambili who is the brother of Sooraj, a hairstylist who had helped Vinay get into the minister's room gets Pankaj out of Xavier's possession on the saying of Vinay. when Vinay is assured that Pankaj is safe, he saves Revathy by turning the gun at Xavier and shooting on his hand and escapes. Xavier takes his pistol out and shoots her and her security guards and follows Vinay. Rajashekhar runs up towards her and starts crying. Then immediately, he begins to laugh and reveals that he had actually arranged for the killing to get even with Revathy. It turns out that he had also applied for the elections with her, but she promised him that if she wins the post, she will immediately hand it over to him. But fearing the illegal operations he might create, she does not give the post to him and takes charge. Then just after he reveals everything, She opens her eyes, and it is revealed that she had actually come to the press meet to check whether Vinay was speaking the truth, and for safety, she and her bodyguards wear bulletproof jackets within their clothes. Rajashekhar is taken into custody. Meanwhile, Vinay fights with Xavier's henchmen who were the security guards at the place and confronts Xavier. He tries to kill Pankaj but Vinay takes a bullet from his mouth, loads it in the gun and shoots Xavier. He goes back to his house with Pankaj, where Mohan and Veena is. When Mohan hits Vinay, Revathy arrives and thanks Vinay for saving him. She tells him that Xavier is not dead. She gives him a job offer in India, to which he refuses and says that he qualified educationally and will miss his parents, which makes them emotional. He didn't take any previous offers from UK, US and other places due to this. Revathy makes his parents understand Vinay's feeling.

== Cast ==
- Asif Ali as Vinay
- Khushbu as Revathy Menon
- Mythili as Krishna
- Master Pankaj Krisshna as Pankaj
- Bala as Xavier
- Sai Kumar as Rajashekhar Menon
- Jagathy Sreekumar as Ambili
- Anoop Chandran as Sooraj
- Assim Jamal as Renji
- Kalasala Babu as Vinay's father
- Lena as Veena
- Irshad as Mohan
- Archana Suseelan as Laila

== Reception ==
The film was panned by critics and subsequently emerged a commercial failure.

== Soundtrack ==
The soundtrack of Cowboy consists of two songs, "Thotithodan Thoni" and "Ullaga Vaalaki".

=== Track listing ===
Cowboy

Soundtrack album by Benny Ignatious
- Genre: Film soundtrack
- Length: 9:46

Track list
No.	Title	Lyrics	Length
1.	"Thottithodan Thoni"	Benny Ignatious	04: 25
2.	"Ullaga Vaalaki"	Benny Ignatious	05: 21
Total length:			09: 46
