= Manjupoloru Penkutti =

- Directed by: Kamal
- Written by: Kalavoor Ravikumar
- Produced by: Howli Pottoor
- Starring: Amrita Prakash; Lalu Alex; Suresh Krishna; Jayakrishnan; Bhanupriya
- Cinematography: P. Sukumar
- Edited by: K. Rajagopal
- Music by: Alphons Joseph
- Production company: Dream Team Productions
- Distributed by: Swargachitra
- Release date: 23 July 2004
- Country: India
- Language: Malayalam

Manjupoloru Penkutti (transl. A girl like snow) is a 2004 Indian Malayalam-language thriller film directed by Kamal and written by Kalavoor Ravikumar. The plot is about a teenage girl who is physically abused numerous times by her stepfather. It stars Amrita Prakash, Lalu Alex, Suresh Krishna, Jayakrishnan, and Bhanupriya. Alphons Joseph composed the music. The film was shot in Kochi and Paris.

== Plot ==
Nidhi is a sixteen-year-old girl who lives with her mother, Arundhathi, her stepfather, Mohan, and her 10-year-old sister, Kani. Later, she meets a neighbour, Manuel, who treats her as his own daughter. She is friends with Sandeep who has a crush on her. Nidhi had been abused by Mohan three years earlier and plans to kill her stepfather.

== Cast ==
- Amrita Prakash as Nidhi S. Menon
- Lalu Alex as Manuel
- Suresh Krishna as Mohan
- Bhanupriya as Arundhathi
- Jayakrishnan Kichu as Sandeep Panicker
- Poornima Anand as Shalini
- Vijeesh as Geevarghese
- Sanusha as Kani S. Menon
- Meera Krishna as Anitha Panicker
- Shamna Kasim as Dhanya
- Deepika Mohan
- Nisha Sarang as Nidhi's teacher
- Bindu Ramakrishnan as Sandeep's grandmother

== Music ==
The film's music was composed by Alphons Joseph.

1. "Am I Dreaming": Sayanora Philip
2. "Ithile Nee Enthe Vannilla": Jyotsna, Karthik
3. "Ithile Nee Enthe Vannilla" (version 2): Jyotsna, Alphonse Joseph
4. "Kai Niraye Kadam Tharumo": Sujatha Mohan, Ganga
5. "Kashmera Sandhye": Ganga Shankar Mahadevan
6. "Kashmera Sandhye" (male): Shankar Mahadevan
7. "Manju Poloru Penkanavu": P. Jayachandran, George Peter, Vidhu Prathap

== Reception ==
The film was accepted by the critics but failed at the box office.
