= GoodnessTv =

GoodnessTv is a Montreal-based video sharing WebTV and non-profit organization that was first launched in 2009 by Laurent Imbault. The channel is dedicated to showing news and videos that cover positive news and promote community and social involvement. Imbault came up with the idea for GoodnessTv after holding a conversation with his mother, who was depressed at what she had been seeing in the news. In response to this, Imbault and his wife Katherine Adams started working on a space that would be dedicated to positive news.

GoodnessTv operates via volunteers and also has a weekly web series, the Positive Minute, a 60-second feature posted to the site each Monday to highlight the actions of local individuals or organizations doing good work in domains ranging from social to cultural to humanitarian. Individuals, NGOs and non-profits can create profiles and broadcast videos about their mission and their field work. Organisations are invited to sign up and open an account to upload videos.
