= Rathri Mazha (TV series) =

Indian Malayalam soap opera

- Also known as: രാത്രി മഴ
- Genre: Drama
- Written by: Mayadevi; Murali Nellinadu
- Directed by: Riju Nair
- Starring: Sreekala Sasidharan; Parvathy R Krishna; Nila Menon
- Country of origin: India
- Original language: Malayalam
- No. of seasons: 1
- No. of episodes: 397

Production
- Producer: Baiju Devraj
- Production location: Thiruvananthapuram, Kerala
- Production company: Sandra Communications

Original release
- Network: Flowers TV
- Release: 19 September 2016 – 16 March 2018

Related
- Pokkuveyil (TV series)

Rathri Mazha (ml; രാത്രി മഴ) was an Indian Malayalam-language soap opera which was launched by Flowers TV on 19 September 2016. It aired on weekdays at 9:30 P.M IST. It is an adaptation of Mayadevi's novel with the same title published in Manorama Weekly. Actress Sreekala Sasidharan played the lead role in the series.

== Cast ==
=== Main ===
- Sreekala Sasidharan as Archana / Alice / Suja
- Niranjan Nair as Sudheesh (Sudhi)
- Parvathy R Krishna as Niranjana

=== Recurring ===
- Thomas Kuriakose as S.P Vishwanathan
- Uma Nair as Jayanthi Vishwanathan
- Nila Menon as Bhagyam
- Sreekala as Shyamala
- Jayan Amboori as Rajappan
- Parvathy Nair as Ambili
- T.N. Krishna as Nadarajan
- Thanvi S Raveendran as Revathy
- Ambarish as Dineshan
- Ranjith Raj as Saji
- Krishna as Rajappan
- Kottayam Manju as Geetha
- Manu Poojappura as Shabari
- Sini Prasad as Karthyayani a.k.a. Kallu Karthyayani
- Shobi Thilikan as Raghavan a.k.a. Chevala Raghavan
- Prakash SP as Faizy
- Dhanya Chandralekha as Snehalatha
- Parvathy Krishnakumar as Dr Hima
- Vinod as CI Surendran
- Lakshmi as Saji's mother
- Rajendran as Commissioner
- Anil as James
- Bindu Menon as Bhamini
- RV Sneha as Mollykutty
- Aakash Menon as Anirudh
- Jayan as Ambrose
- Maya Suresh as Thenmala Rosy
- Santhosh as Ashokan
- Rahul as Vishnu
- Anirudh Rajsekhar

== Awards ==
Kerala State Television Awards

- Special Jurie Prize -Nila Menon

Kerala Vision Television Awards

- Best Performance -Nila Menon

Mangalam Television Awards 2017

- Best Serial
- Best Director - Baiju Devraj
- Best Associate Director -Raju Nair
- Special Jury prize -Nila Menon
