= Bala (actor) =

Indian actor

- Born: Bala Kumar Jayakumar; 19 December 1982 (age 43); Chennai, Tamil Nadu, India
- Occupations: Actor; director
- Years active: 2002–present
- Spouses: Chandana Sadashiva (m. 2008; div. 2009); Amrutha Suresh (m. 2010; div. 2019); Elizabeth Udayan (m. 2021; div. 2024); Kokila (m. 2024)
- Children: 1
- Relatives: Siruthai Siva (brother)

Bala Kumar (born 19 December 1982) is an Indian actor and director, who works in Malayalam and Tamil films. He made his debut in the Telugu film 2 Much (2002). He is well known for his roles in films such as Big B (2007), Sound of Boot (2008), Puthiya Mukham (2009), Hero (2012), Veeram (2014), Ennu Ninte Moideen (2015), Pulimurugan (2016), Aanakkallan (2018), Lucifer (2019), and Thambi (2019).

== Early life ==
Bala was born on 19 December 1982, into a family associated with the Tamil film industry. His grandfather, A. K. Velan, owned the film production house Arunachalam Studios and worked as a producer and screenwriter. Bala's father, Jayakumar, was a documentary photographer and short film director with over 400 works to his credit. Bala has two siblings: a brother and a sister. His brother, Siva, is a film director and cinematographer, while his sister is a scientist. Bala initially pursued a Bachelor of Technology (B.Tech) degree in engineering but later switched to a Bachelor of Business Administration (BBA). While studying for his BBA, he began his career in acting.

== Career ==
He made his debut in Telugu with 2 Much (2002) and in Tamil with Anbu (2003). Since then he acted and found success in a number of Malayalam films. He received appreciation for his role in the 2009 film Puthiya Mukham. He made a comeback to Tamil cinema in 2014 with the Ajith Kumar-starrer Veeram. The film, directed by his brother Siva, the film was a critical and commercial success.

Bala made his directorial debut with the 2012 Malayalam action film The Hitlist, in which he played the leading role. In 2015 and 2016, he performed notable supporting roles in the period romantic drama Ennu Ninte Moideen and the action film Pulimurugan, and Lucifer in 2019, all three were the highest-grossing Malayalam films of all time.

== Personal life ==
Bala is religious and a devotee of god Shiva. On 27 August 2010, he married, for a second time, Idea Star Singer-fame Malayali singer Amrutha Suresh. They have a daughter, born in September 2012. The couple divorced in 2019 after living separately for four years.

On 5 September 2021, he married Elizabeth Udayan, who is a doctor by profession. In an interview in 2023, Bala revealed he was living separately from Elizabeth. On 22 October 2024, Bala married, for the fourth time, his cousin, Kokila.

== Controversies ==
One of Bala's former partners accused him of rape and abuse. His ex-wife Amrutha Suresh alleged forgery in divorce case. He was arrested on charges of outraging a woman's modesty following ex-wife's complaint. Bala has been arrested for threatening a YouTuber and his friend after trespassing his flat.

== Filmography ==
=== Malayalam films ===
Year	Title	Role	Notes
2005	Arabikadhakal	Alavudeen Abdulla Hussan	
2006	Kalabham	Shajahan aka Arjun	
2007	Hareendran Oru Nishkalankan	Commn. Rajan Mathew	
2007	Big B	Murugan John Kurishingal	
2008	Aayudham	Anwar	
2008	Bullet	Flop	
2008	SMS	Kichan	
2008	Sound of Boot	Rahul Krishna	
2008	Drona 2010	Anandapadmanabhan	
2008	Chempada	Manu	
2009	Venalmaram	Vinayakan	
2009	Puthiya Mukham	Sudhi	
2009	Sagar Alias Jacky Reloaded	Special Appearance	
2010	Black Stallion	Ameer Usman	
2010	Alexander The Great	Manu	
2010	Ringtone	Krishna	
2010	Avan	P. V. Krishnan	
2010	Patham Adhyayam	Achu	
2010	Sahasram	Vaishakhan	
2010	Chaverpada	Visal Sabhapathy	
2011	Kayam	Sasikuttan	
2011	Priyappetta Nattukare	Satheesh Kumar	
2011	Sivapuram	Shivan	
2011	Sthalam		
2011	Makaramanju	Rajaraja Varma	
2012	Mullassery Madhavan Kutty Nemom P. O.	Khalid	
2012	Hero	Uday	
2012	Musafir	Sakthidharan	
2012	The Hitlist	Vikram Rathore	Directorial debut
2013	Cowboy	Xavier	
2015	Ennu Ninte Moideen	Sethu	
2016	Pulimurugan	Shiva	
2017	Nilavariyathe	Pokkan	
2018	Wonder Boys		
2018	Aanakkallan	Suryanarayanan	
2019	Lucifer	Bhadran	Cameo appearance
2019	1948 Kaalam Paranjathu		
2019	An International Local Story		
2019	Fancy Dress	Gabriel	
2021	My Dear Machans	Ranganathan	
2022	Shefeekkinte Santhosham	Ameer	
2024	Bad Boyz		

=== Tamil films ===
Year	Title	Role	Notes
2003	Anbu	Anbu	
2003	Kadhal Kisu Kisu	Sriram	
2004	Amma Appa Chellam	Chellam	
2006	Kalinga	Kalinga	
2009	Manjal Veyil	Ravi	
2014	Veeram	Murugan	
2019	Thambi	MLA Manimaaran	
2021	Annaatthe	Arjun	

=== Other language films ===
Year	Title	Role	Language	Notes
2002	2 Much	Bullebbai	Telugu	Credited as Bala Kumar
2010	Chapter 6		Telugu	
2012	The Hitlist	Vikram Rathore	Kannada	

=== Television ===
Year	Title	Role	Channel	Language	Notes
2007	Idea Star Singer	Celebrity Judge	Asianet	Malayalam	
2011	Vivel Big Break	Judge	Surya TV	Malayalam	
2015	Uggram Ujjwalam	Judge	Mazhavil Manorama	Malayalam	
2019	Thakarppan Comedy	Judge	Mazhavil Manorama	Malayalam	
2020	Snehathode Veetil Ninnu	Himself	Mazhavil Manorama	Malayalam	Quarantine special show
2021	Star Magic	Mentor	Flowers TV	Malayalam	
2022-2023	Comedy Masters	Judge	Amrita TV	Malayalam	
2023	Funs Upon A Time season 3	Judge	Amrita TV	Malayalam	
