= List of Malayalam films of 2012 =

The tables list the Malayalam films released in theatres in the year 2012. Premiere shows and film festival screenings are not considered as releases for this list.

== Released films ==
The following is the list of Malayalam films released in the year 2012.

=== Malayalam films ===
Opening		Title	Director	Cast	Genre	Ref
J A N U A R Y	5	Orkut Oru Ormakoot (ഓർക്കൂട്ട് ഒരു ഓർമ്മക്കൂട്ട്)	Manoj-Vinod	Rima Kallingal, Ben Lalu Alex, Joe Siby Malayil, Anu Mohan, Vishnu Raghav	Drama, Romance	
J A N U A R Y	6	Asuravithu (അസുരവിത്ത്‌)	A. K. Sajan	Asif Ali, Samvrutha Sunil, Lena	Action	
J A N U A R Y	6	Kunjaliyan (കുഞ്ഞളിയൻ)	Saji Surendran	Jayasurya, Ananya, Suraj Venjaramoodu, Vijayaraghavan, Maniyanpilla Raju, Jagadish, Manikuttan	Comedy	
J A N U A R Y	14	Padmasree Bharat Dr. Saroj Kumar (പത്മശ്രീ ഭരത് ഡോക്ടർ സരോജ് കുമാർ)	Sajin Raaghavan	Sreenivasan, Mamta Mohandas, Vineeth Sreenivasan, Fahad Fazil	Black comedy, Satire	
J A N U A R Y	20	Spanish Masala (സ്പാനിഷ് മസാല)	Lal Jose	Dileep, Kunchacko Boban, Daniela Zacherl, Biju Menon	Romance, Drama, Comedy	
J A N U A R Y	26	Casanovva (കാസനോവ)	Rosshan Andrrews	Mohanlal, Shriya Saran, Roma, Lakshmi Rai	Action, Romance, Thriller	
F E B R U A R Y	3	Second Show	Srinath Rajendran	Dulquer Salman, Gauthami Nair, Sunny Wayne	Crime, Action	
F E B R U A R Y	4	Njanum Ente Familiyum (ഞാനും എന്റെ ഫാമിലിയും)	K. K. Rajeev	Jayaram, Mamta Mohandas, Mythili, Manoj K Jayan	Family	
F E B R U A R Y	10	Kochi (കൊച്ചി)	S. Kishore	Nassar, Seetha, Jagadish, Archana Suseelan, Meera Vasudevan	Family, Romance	
F E B R U A R Y	10	Mullassery Madhavan Kutty Nemom P. O. (മുല്ലശ്ശേരി മാധവൻകുട്ടി നേമം പി. ഒ.)	Kumar Nanda	Anoop Menon, Sonal Devaraj	Family, Drama	
F E B R U A R Y	10	Themmadikkoottam (തെമ്മാടിക്കൂട്ടം)	K. Sujith	Jagathy Sreekumar, Sanni, Ranjith, Maneesh, Sajo, Gopika Palat	Comedy	
F E B R U A R Y	10	Unnam (ഉന്നം)	Sibi Malayil	Asif Ali, Rima Kallingal, Lal, Swetha Menon, Sreenivasan	Thriller	
F E B R U A R Y	17	Ee Thirakkinidayil (ഈ തിരക്കിനിടയിൽ)	Anil Kaarakkulam	Vinu Mohan, Muktha, Shaju	Drama	
F E B R U A R Y	17	Father's Day ( ഫാദേഴ്സ് ഡേ)	Kalavoor Ravikumar	Shehin, Indu Thampi, Lal, Revathi, Shankar Panikkar, Resul Pookutty	Drama	
F E B R U A R Y	17	Oomakkuyil Padumbol (ഊമക്കുയിൽ പാടുമ്പോൾ)	Siddhique Chennamangalloor	Malavika Nair, Shankar Panikkar, Sangeetha Rajendran	Family, Children's film	
F E B R U A R Y	24	Ee Adutha Kaalathu (ഈ അടുത്ത കാലത്ത്)	Arun Kumar	Indrajith, Anoop Menon, Mythili, Murali Gopi, Lena	Thriller	
F E B R U A R Y	24	Ideal Couple	Ali Akbar	Vineeth, Lakshmi Menon, Nassar, Usha Uthup	Comedy, Family	
F E B R U A R Y	24	Nidra (നിദ്ര)	Siddharth	Siddharth, Jishnu Raghavan, Rima Kallingal, Sarayu	Romantic thriller	
M A R C H	2	Achante Aanmakkal (അച്ഛന്റെ ആൺമക്കൾ)	Chandrasekharan	Sarath Kumar, Meghna Raj, Jagadish, Nedumudi Venu	Action	
M A R C H	2	Thalsamayam Oru Penkutty (തല്‍സമയം ഒരു പെണ്‍കുട്ടി)	T. K. Rajeev Kumar	Unni Mukundan, Nithya Menon, Shweta Menon	Drama, Romance, Satire	
M A R C H	9	Crime Story	Anil Thomas	Rahul Madhav, Vishupriya	Crime thriller	
M A R C H	9	Shikari (ശിക്കാരി)	Abhaya Simha	Mammootty, Poonam Bajwa	Period, Patriotic, Drama	
M A R C H	9	Pakarnnattam (പകർന്നാട്ടം)	Jayaraj	Jayaram, Sabitha Jayaraj	Art	
M A R C H	16	Dhanyam (ധന്യം)	Jayalal	Pratheesh Nandan, Pooja	Romance	
M A R C H	16	Orange	Biju Varkey	Kalabhavan Mani, Biju Menon, Lena	Drama	
M A R C H	16	Karmayogi (കർമ്മയോഗി)	V. K. Prakash	Indrajith, Nithya Menon, Saiju Kurup, Thalaivasal Vijay, Padmini Kolhapure	Period, Revenge	
M A R C H	17	Ordinary	Sugeeth	Kunchacko Boban, Biju Menon, Shritha Shivadas, Asif Ali, Ann Augustine, Lalu Alex	Romantic drama	
M A R C H	23	The King & The Commissioner	Shaji Kailas	Mammootty, Suresh Gopi, Samvrutha Sunil, Sai Kumar	Action thriller	
M A R C H	23	Lt. Colonel Satheesh Pandit	Shanavas	Shanavas	Parody	
M A R C H	30	Masters	Johny Antony	Prithviraj, Ananya, Sasikumar, Pia Bajpai, Mukesh	Thriller	
M A R C H	30	Outsider	Premlal	Indrajith, Sreenivasan, Ganga Babu, Pasupathy	Thriller	
A P R I L	6	Pulival Pattanam (പുലിവാൽ പട്ടണം)	Santhosh	Jagadish, Jagathy Sreekumar, Salim Kumar	Comedy	
A P R I L	6	Track	K. P. Venu — Abraham Lincoln	Rahul Madhav, Anoop Menon, Rosin Jolly, Sree Dhanya	Sports	
A P R I L	7	Mayamohini (മായാമോഹിനി)	Jose Thomas	Dileep, Biju Menon, Mythili, Baburaj, Mohan Sharma	Comedy	
A P R I L	12	Cobra	Lal	Mammootty, Lal, Padmapriya, Kaniha, Lalu Alex, Babu Antony, Salim Kumar, Maniyanpilla Raju, Jagathy Sreekumar	Comedy, Action	
A P R I L	13	22 Female Kottayam	Aashiq Abu	Fahad Fazil, Rima Kallingal	Revenge, Thriller	
A P R I L	20	Josettante Hero (ജോസേട്ടന്റെ ഹീറോ)	K. K. Haridas	Anoop Menon, Kriti Kapoor	Drama	
A P R I L	20	MLA Mani: Patham Classum Gusthiyum (എം.എൽ.എ. മണി പത്താം ക്ലാസ്സും ഗുസ്തിയും)	Sreejith Paleri	Kalabhavan Mani, Siddique, Vidya, Vijayaraghavan	Action	
A P R I L	27	Doctor Innocentanu (ഡോക്ടർ ഇന്നസെന്റാണ്)	Ajmal	Innocent, Sona Nair	Comedy	
A P R I L	27	Lumiere Brothers (ലൂമിയർ ബ്രദേഴ്സ്)	Madhu Thattampalli	Ramesh Krishna, Hari, Supriya Krishna		
M A Y	3	Grandmaster	B. Unnikrishnan	Mohanlal, Priyamani, Narain, Babu Antony, Anoop Menon	Thriller, Mystery	
M A Y	4	Diamond Necklace	Lal Jose	Fahad Fazil, Samvrutha Sunil, Gauthami Nair, Anusree	Romantic drama	
M A Y	4	Mallu Singh (മല്ലൂസിംഗ്)	Vysakh	Kunchako Boban, Unni Mukundan, Samvrutha Sunil, Biju Menon, Manoj K. Jayan, Suraj Venjaramoodu	Masala	
M A Y	18	Arike (അരികെ)	Shyamaprasad	Dileep, Mamta Mohandas, Samvrutha Sunil	Romance	
M A Y	18	Grihanathan (ഗൃഹനാഥൻ)	Mohan Kupleri	Mukesh, Sonia Agarwal	Family	
M A Y	18	Lakshmi Vilasam Renuka Makan Raghuram (ലക്ഷ്മിവിലാസം രേണുക മകൻ രഘുരാമൻ)	M. Basheer	Urvashi, Suraj Venjaramoodu, Ashokan		
M A Y	18	Manjadikuru (മഞ്ചാടിക്കുരു)	Anjali Menon	Prithviraj SukumaranUrvashi, Rahman, Sindhu Menon	Drama	
M A Y	25	Hero	Diphan	Prithviraj, Srikanth, Yami Gautam, Anoop Menon, Thalaivasal Vijay	Action thriller	
M A Y	25	Ezham Suryan (ഏഴാം സൂര്യൻ)	Njanasheelan	Unni Mukundan, Mahalakshmi, Suraj Venjaramoodu		
M A Y	25	Thiruvambadi Thamban (തിരുവമ്പാടി തമ്പാൻ)	M. Padmakumar	Jayaram, Haripriya, Kishore, Jagathy Sreekumar, Nedumudi Venu	Action thriller	
J U N E	1	Veendum Kannur (വീണ്ടും കണ്ണൂർ)	Haridas Keshavan	Anoop Menon, Sandhya, Arun, Rajeev Pillai	Political thriller	
J U N E	8	Navagatharkku Swagatham (നവാഗതർക്കു് സ്വാഗതം)	Jayakrishna Karnavar	Mukesh, Vinay Forrt, Jyothirmayi	Romantic comedy	
J U N E	8	Snake & Ladder	V. Menon	Kalabhavan Mani, Guinness Pakru, Neha Pendse		
J U N E	8	Vaadhyar (വാദ്ധ്യാർ)	Nidheesh Sakthi	Jayasurya, Ann Augustine, Menaka, Nedumudi Venu	Comedy, Satire	
J U N E	14	Spirit	Ranjith	Mohanlal, Kaniha, Shankar Ramakrishnan, Lena	Satire	
J U N E	15	Bachelor Party	Amal Neerad	Prithviraj, Indrajith, Asif Ali, Nithya Menon, Rahman, Kalabhavan Mani, Remya Nambeesan	Action, Road movie	
J U N E	15	Kalikaalam (കലികാലം)	Reji Nair	Sharada, Ashokan, Lakshmi Sharma	Drama	
J U N E	15	Silent Valley	Syed Usman	Nidheesh, Roopasree, Rithi Mangal, Agatha Magnus	Thriller, Horror	
J U N E	29	Namukku Parkkan (നമുക്ക് പാർക്കാൻ)	Aji John	Anoop Menon, Meghna Raj, Jayasurya	Drama	
J U N E	29	No. 66 Madhura Bus	M. A. Nishad	Pasupathi, Padmapriya, Mallika, Swetha Menon	Road movie, Revenge	
J U N E	29	Ustad Hotel	Anwar Rasheed	Dulquer Salman, Nithya Menon, Thilakan, Siddique	Romantic drama	
J U L Y	5	Naughty Professor	Hari Narayanan	Baburaj, Lakshmi Gopalaswamy, Lena	Comedy	
J U L Y	6	Thattathin Marayathu (തട്ടത്തിൻ മറയത്ത്)	Vineeth Sreenivasan	Nivin Pauly, Isha TalwarAju Varghese	Romance	
J U L Y	6	Bodhi (ബോധി)	G. Ajayan	Pooja Vijayan, Babu Annoor, Gopakumar, Ramesh Varma		
J U L Y	12	Mullamottum Munthiricharum (മുല്ലമൊട്ടും മുന്തിരിച്ചാറും)	Aneesh Anwar	Indrajith, Meghana Raj, Ananya, Thilakan	Drama	
J U L Y	13	Little Master	L. Rajendran	Lal, Master Shamal, Lakshmi Gopalaswamy, Madhupal	Children's film, Drama	
J U L Y	19	Ajantha (അജന്ത)	Rajppa Ravishanker	Vinu Mohan, Honey Rose	Drama, Romance	
J U L Y	20	Akasathinte Niram (ആകാശത്തിന്റെ നിറം)	Dr. Biju	Indrajith, Prithviraj, Amala Paul, Nedumudi Venu	Drama	
J U L Y	20	Perinoru Makan (പേരിനൊരു മകൻ)	Vinu Anand	Bhagath Manuel, Saranya Mohan, Innocent, Guinness Pakru	Drama, Romance	
J U L Y	27	Cinema Company	Mamas	Basil, Sanjeev, Shruthi Hariharan, Badri, Sanam Shetty, Lakshmi	Drama, Romance	
J U L Y	27	Ivan Megharoopan (ഇവൻ മേഘരൂപൻ)	P. Balachandran	Prakash Bare, Padmapriya, Shweta Menon, Remya Nambeesan	Biographical, Drama	
A U G U S T	3	Last Bench	Jiju Ashok	Mahesh, Sukanya	Drama, Romance	
A U G U S T	3	Nadabrahmam (നാദബ്രഹ്മം)	Dr. Biju Lal	Kaushik Babu, Mahalakshmi, Unni Maya	Family, Drama	
A U G U S T	3	Superstar Santhosh Pandit	Santhosh Pandit	Santhosh Pandit, Roopa	Parody	
A U G U S T	10	Simhasanam (സിംഹാസനം)	Shaji Kailas	Prithviraj, Sai Kumar, Siddique, Biju Pappan	Action	
A U G U S T	10	Gramam (ഗ്രാമം)	Mohan Sharma	Nishan, Samvrutha Sunil, Nedumudi Venu, Sukumari	Drama	
A U G U S T	10	Koodaram (കൂടാരം)	Tharadas	Thilakan, Salim Kumar	Drama	
A U G U S T	17	Neeranjanam (നീരാഞ്ജനം)	V. K. Unnikrishnan	Kuzhalmandam Ramakrishnan, Anubala	Drama	
A U G U S T	18	Mr. Marumakan (മിസ്റ്റർ മരുമകൻ)	Sandhya Mohan	Dileep, Sanusha, Khushbu, Biju Menon	Masala	
A U G U S T	18	Friday (ഫ്രൈഡേ)	Lijin Jose	Fahad Fazil, Ann Augustine, Manu	Drama, Thriller	
A U G U S T	19	Thappana (താപ്പാന)	Johny Antony	Mammootty, Charmy Kaur, Murali Gopy, Vijayaraghavan, Kalabhavan Shajohn, Suresh Krishna	Drama, Road movie	
A U G U S T	19	Red Alert (റെഡ് അലര്‍ട്ട്)	A. K. Jayan	Mukesh, Lena, Vidya	Drama	
A U G U S T	29	Run Baby Run (റണ്‍ ബേബി റണ്‍ )	Joshiy	Mohanlal, Amala Paul, Biju Menon, Siddique, Shammi Thilakan, Mithun Ramesh	Thriller, Comedy	
S E P T E M B E R	7	Ozhimuri (ഒഴിമുറി)	Madhupal	Lal, Swetha Menon, Asif Ali, Bhavana,	Drama	
S E P T E M B E R	7	Rasaleela (രാസലീല)	Majeed Marangery	Dharshan, Pratishta	Romance	
S E P T E M B E R	13	Chattakaari (ചട്ടക്കാരി)	Santosh Sethumadhavan	Shamna Kasim, Hemanth Menon, Innocent, Sukumari	Drama, Romance	
S E P T E M B E R	14	Bhoopadathil Illatha Oridam (ഭൂപടത്തിൽ ഇല്ലാത്ത ഒരിടം)	Joe Chalissery	Sreenivasan, Nivin Pauly, Rajsree Nair, Iniya	Satire, Drama	
S E P T E M B E R	14	Ithra Mathram (ഇത്ര മാത്രം)	K. Gopinathan	Biju Menon, Swetha Menon	Drama, Mystery	
S E P T E M B E R	14	Molly Aunty Rocks!	Ranjith Sankar	Prithviraj, Revathi	Satire, Drama	
S E P T E M B E R	21	Husbands in Goa	Saji Surendran	Jayasurya, Indrajith, Lal, Asif Ali, Rima Kallingal, Bhama, Remya Nambeesan, Praveena	Comedy	
S E P T E M B E R	21	Trivandrum Lodge	V. K. Prakash	Jayasurya, Honey Rose, Anoop Menon	Romantic drama, Black comedy	
S E P T E M B E R	21	Chuzhalikkattu (ചുഴലിക്കാറ്റു്)	Gireesh Kunnummel	Jayakrishnan, Anjana Menon	Drama	
S E P T E M B E R	27	Puthiya Theerangal (പുതിയ തീരങ്ങൾ)	Sathyan Anthikkad	Nivin Pauly, Namitha Pramod, Nedumudi Venu, Innocent, Siddique	Family drama	
S E P T E M B E R	28	Ennennum Ormakkay (എന്നെന്നും ഓർമ്മയ്ക്കായ്)	Robin Joseph	Sreejith Vijay, Dhanya Mary Varghese	Romance	
S E P T E M B E R	28	Theruvu Nakshatrangal (തെരുവു് നക്ഷത്രങ്ങൾ)	Jose Mavely	Tini Tom, Lakshmi Viswanath, Salim Kumar, Kaviyoor Ponnamma, Captain Raju	Drama	
O C T O B E R	5	Banking Hours 10 to 4	K. Madhu	Anoop Menon, Jishnu Raghavan, Meghna Raj, Ashokan, Kailash	Crime thriller	
O C T O B E R	5	Manthrikan (മാന്ത്രികൻ)	Anil	Jayaram, Poonam Bajwa, Ramesh Pisharody, Devan, Muktha, Kalabhavan Shajohn	Comedy horror	
O C T O B E R	12	Karpooradeepam (കർപ്പൂരദീപം)	George Kithu	Siddique, Santhi Krishna	Drama	
O C T O B E R	12	Vaidooryam (വൈഡൂര്യം)	Saseendra K.Shankar	Kailash, Nakshathra	Romance	
O C T O B E R	19	Ayalum Njanum Thammil (അയാളും ഞാനും തമ്മിൽ)	Lal Jose	Prithviraj, Pratap K Pothen, Samvrutha Sunil, Rima Kallingal, Remya Nambeesan, Narain, Kalabhavan Mani	Romantic thriller	
O C T O B E R	19	Jawan of Vellimala (ജവാൻ ഓഫ് വെള്ളിമല)	Anoop Kannan	Mammootty, Mamta Mohandas, Asif Ali, Sreenivasan	Drama	
O C T O B E R	26	Kaashh (കാശ്)	Sujith-Sajith	Rajeev Pillai, Bineesh Kodiyeri, Vineeth Kumar, Bazil	Action, Comedy	
O C T O B E R	26	Padmavyooham (പത്മവ്യൂഹം)	Bijoy P. I.	Noby Tharian, Amal Abraham	Mystery, Thriller	
O C T O B E R	26	Parudeesa (പറുദീസ)	R. Sarath	Sreenivasan, Thampy Antony, Swetha Menon	Drama	
O C T O B E R	26	Prabhuvinte Makkal (പ്രഭുവിന്റെ മക്കൾ)	Sajeevan Anthikad	Vinay Forrt, Swasika, Madhu	Drama	
N O V E M B E R	10	916	M. Mohanan	Asif Ali, Mukesh, Anoop Menon, Meera Vasudev	Drama	
N O V E M B E R	10	My Boss	Jeethu Joseph	Dileep, Mamta Mohandas, Sai Kumar, Mukesh, Kalabhavan Shajohn	Romantic comedy	
N O V E M B E R	16	Theevram (തീവ്രം)	Roopesh Peethambaran	Dulquer Salman, Shikha Nair, Riya Saira	Drama	
N O V E M B E R	23	101 Weddings	Shafi	Jayasurya, Kunchacko Boban, Biju Menon, Samvrutha Sunil	Romantic comedy, Drama	
N O V E M B E R	23	Ardhanaari (അർദ്ധനാരി)	Santhosh Souparnika	Manoj K Jayan, Mahalakshmi, Thilakan	Drama	
N O V E M B E R	23	Idiots	K. S. Bava	Asif Ali, Sanusha	Romantic comedy	
N O V E M B E R	23	Scene Onnu Nammude Veedu (സീൻ 1 നമ്മുടെ വീടു്)	Shaiju Anthikkad	Lal, Navya Nair, Lalu Alex, Thilakan, Harisree Ashokan	Drama	
N O V E M B E R	30	Chettayees (ചേട്ടായീസ്)	Shajoon Kariyal	Biju Menon, Lal, Miya, Suresh Krishna, P. Sukumar	Comedy, Drama	
N O V E M B E R	30	Face to Face	V. M. Vinu	Mammootty, Roma Asrani, Ragini Dwivedi	Mystery, Thriller	
N O V E M B E R	30	Poppins	V. K. Prakash	Jayasurya, Indrajith, Kunchacko Boban, Meghana Raj, Padmapriya, Nithya Menen	Drama	
D E C E M B E R	7	Chapters	Sunil Ibrahim	Nivin Pauly, Sreenivasan, Gauthami Nair, Rejith Menon	Thriller	
D E C E M B E R	7	Hide N' Seek	Anil	Divya Darshan, Natasha, Mukesh, Shankar	Drama, Romance	
D E C E M B E R	7	The Hitlist	Bala	Bala, Sandhya, Aishwarya Devan, Unni Mukundan	Action thriller	
D E C E M B E R	7	Madirasi (മദിരാശി)	Shaji Kailas	Jayaram, Meera Nandan, Meghana Raj, Tini Tom	Comedy, Action	
D E C E M B E R	7	Oru Kudumba Chithram (ഒരു കുടുംബചിത്രം)	Ramesh Tambi	Kalabhavan Mani, Lakshmi Sharma, Ranjith, Thalaivasal Vijay	Drama	
D E C E M B E R	13	Matinee	Aneesh Upasana	Maqbool Salmaan, Mythili, Lena	Romance, Drama	
D E C E M B E R	14	Yakshi – Faithfully Yours	Abhiram Unnithan	Avanthika Mohan, Parvathy Nair, Ved, Faizal, Shivakumar	Fantasy, Romance	
D E C E M B E R	21	Bavuttiyude Namathil (ബാവുട്ടിയുടെ നാമത്തിൽ)	G. S. Vijayan	Mammootty, Kavya Madhavan, Shankar Ramakrishnan, Kaniha, Rima Kallingal, Vineeth	Drama	
D E C E M B E R	21	Da Thadiya (ഡാ തടിയാ)	Aashiq Abu	Shekhar Menon, Ann Augustine, Sreenath Bhasi, Nivin Pauly	Romance, Comedy	
D E C E M B E R	21	I Love Me	B. Unnikrishnan	Unni MukundanAsif Ali, Isha Talwar, Anoop Menon	Thriller, Romance	
D E C E M B E R	21	Karmayodha (കർമ്മയോദ്ധാ)	Major Ravi	Mohanlal, Asha Sharath, Murali Sharma	Action thriller	
D E C E M B E R	28	Aakasmikam (ആകസ്മികം)	George Kithu	Siddique, Swetha Menon	Drama	
		3D Stereo Caste	A. S. Ajith Kumar			
		Mazhavillinattam Vare	Kaithapram Damodaran, Namboothiri	Abbas Hasan, Archana Jose Kavi		
		Thanichalla Njan	Babu Thiruvalla	K. P. A. C. Lalitha, Kalpana		
