= Silent Valley =

Silent Valley may refer to:

- Silent Valley National Park, in Palakkad district, Kerala, India
- Silent Valley Reservoir, in the Mourne Mountains near Kilkeel, County Down, Northern Ireland
- Silent Valley (1935 film), an American Western film
- Silent Valley (2012 film), an Indian Malayalam-language thriller film
