= Renuka Menon =

Indian film actress

- Born: 3 November 1983 (age 42); Alappuzha, Kerala, India
- Other name: Renu
- Education: Bachelor of Business Administration
- Occupations: Actress; model; dancer
- Years active: 2002–2006
- Known for: Nammal (2002); Daas (2005); Vargam (2006)
- Spouse: Suraj Menon (m. 2006)
- Children: 2

Renuka Menon (born 3 November 1983) is a former Indian actress who has predominantly appeared in Malayalam and Telugu-language films as well as some Tamil-language and Kannada films.

She made her acting debut in Nammal (2002). Her notable films include Daas (2005), Vargam (2006) and Kalabha Kadhalan (2006). In 2006, Menon retired from acting and currently runs a dance school in California.

== Early and personal life ==
Renuka was born on 3 November 1983 in Alappuzha and also she pursued her Bachelor of Business Administration degree in Thrissur. She married Suraj Menon, a US-based software engineer, on 21 November 2006. They have two daughters, Swathi and Anika.

== Career ==
=== 2002-2004: Early debut and its recognition ===
At the age of 19, Renuka made her acting debut through Nammal opposite Jishnu Raghavan, Sidharth Bharathan and Bhavana. It was commercially successful and well received by critics.

Then she acted in several films Mayamohithachandran, Freedom and Meerayude Dukhavum Muthuvinte Swapnavum along with Prithviraj. Then, she made her Telugu-language debut in Anandamanandamaye along with Jai Akash and it received positive reviews from critics.

=== 2005-2006: Foray into other industries ===
In 2005, Menon made her debut Tamil-language and Kannada film debuts in February 14, alongside Bharath, and News opposite Upendra, respectively. Later that year, she starred in another Tamil film, Daas opposite Jayam Ravi and it was praised by critics.

In 2006, she acted in the Malayalam film Vargam, paired with Prithviraj again after Meerayude Dukhavum Muthuvinte Swapnavum, following which, she appeared in the Tamil film Kalabha Kadhalan opposite Arya and in the multi-starrer Pathaaka.

== Filmography ==
=== Films ===
Year	Film	Role	Language	Notes	Ref
2002	Nammal	Aparna	Malayalam	Malayalam debut	
2003	Meerayude Dukhavum Muthuvinte Swapnavum	Aswathy	Malayalam		
2003	Mayamohithachandran	Maya	Malayalam		
2004	Freedom	Anjali	Malayalam		
2004	Anandamanandamaye	Bhuvaneshwari	Telugu	Telugu debut	
2004	Valliddaru Okkate	Sravani	Telugu		
2005	February 14	Pooja	Tamil	Tamil debut	
2005	News	Divya	Kannada	Kannada debut	
2005	Daas	Rajeshwari	Tamil		
2006	Vargam	Nadhiya	Malayalam		
2006	Kalabha Kadhalan	Anbarasi	Tamil		
2006	Pathaaka	Meera Menon	Malayalam		
2009	Madhan	Renuka	Tamil	Unreleased film	

=== TV shows ===
Year	Show	Channel	Notes	Ref
2003	Onnanu Nammal	Surya TV	paired with Nammal	
