= Hashir Mohamed =

Indian screenwriter

- Born: Kerala, India
- Occupations: Writer, Film maker
- Years active: 2011 - present

Hashir Mohamed (Kerala, India) is a screen writer in Malayalam cinema.

== Early life and education ==
Hashir Mohamed was born in Kottakkal, kerala, and was graduated from College of Engineering, Trivandrum . His family name is Valiyakandathil.

== Career ==
After graduation, before joining films Hashir Mohamed worked with IT companies like HCL (Bangalore), Accenture (Chennai), Nokia (Helsinki), and Deutsche Bank (Singapore)

His first film as a writer, Aami in Anchu Sundharikal directed by Anwar Rasheed was released in 2013- June, and his second film as writer Neelakasham Pachakadal Chuvanna Bhoomi (NPCB) directed by Sameer Thahir was released in 2013- August. Many incidents in the film NPCB were reportedly based on real life incidents. Both were commercially successful and critically acclaimed.

== Sexual Assault Charges and Imprisonment ==
On 28 February 2014, Maradu police arrested Hashir Mohamed from his apartment, on charges of assault on a woman with sexual intent.

When the lady came down from the 10th storey flat to get baby food from the 4th story flat of her sister, Hashir Mohamed came down from the flat above in the nude and assaulted her outside the flat. When she cried out for help, neighbours came out and apprehended him. He was later handed over to the police. The police said that he was in the nude and under the influence of drugs during the act. In the subsequent search, cops recovered ganja from his flat. In the bail petition, Hashir denied the charges.

He was awarded a sentence of three and half years imprisonment and 40,000 rupees fine by the Ernakulam additional sessions court for this crime.

== Filmography ==
Year	Title		Notes
2013	Anchu Sundharikal	writer	The story Ami in the Anthology film Starring Fahad Fazil directed by Anwar Rasheed
2013	Neelakasham Pachakadal Chuvanna Bhoomi	writer	Starring Dulquer Salmaan and Sunny Wayne. Directed by Sameer Thahir
2024	Sookshmadarshini	Creative Director	Starring Nazriya Nazim and Basil Joseph. Directed by M. C. Jithin
