= Ambika Mohan =

Indian actress

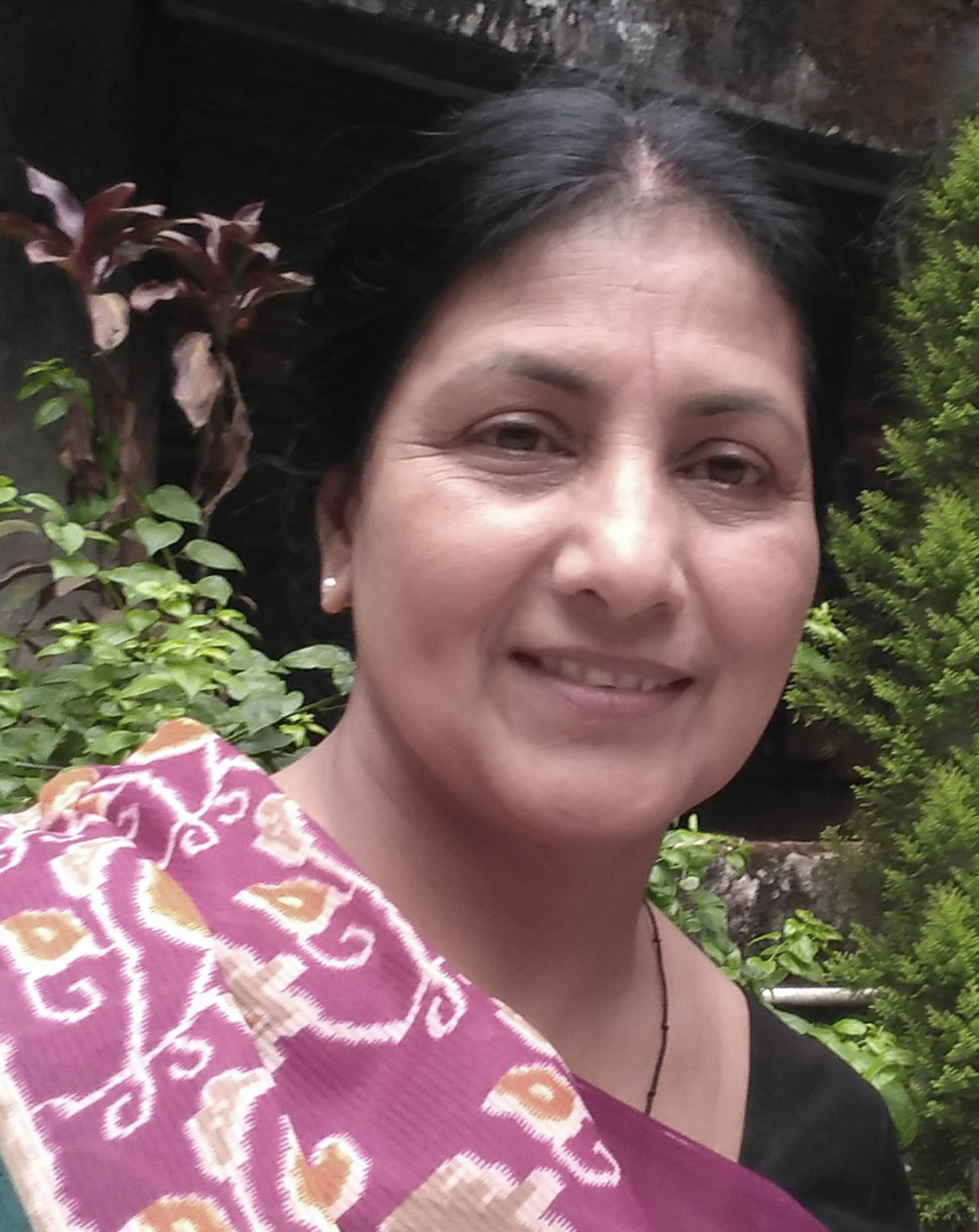
- Occupation: Actress
- Years active: 2001–present
- Spouse: Mohan

Ambika Mohan is an Indian actress known for her work in Malayalam cinema and television series, primarily in supporting roles. She made her debut in the film Meghamalhar (2001) and has acted in over 300 films.

== Filmography ==
List of Ambika Mohan film credits
Year	Title	Role	Notes
2000	Mark Antony	Mullakka's Beevi	
2001	Meghamalhar	Rajeevan's sister-in-law	
2001	Rakshasa Rajavu	Sebastian's wife	
2002	Kanmashi	Varsha's mother	
2002	Meesa Madhavan	Santhamma	
2002	Snehithan	Soudamini	
2002	Nandanam	Unniyamma's kin	
2002	Nammal	Mariyamma Thomas	
2002	Ente Hridayathinte Udama	Uma's mother	
2002	Bhavam	Teacher	
2002	Krishna Pakshakkilikal	Gayathri	
2003	Sadanandante Samayam	Nabeesu	
2003	Kasthooriman	Vanaja	
2003	Saudhamini	Saradha	
2003	Chakram	Madhuri's mother	
2003	Pattalam	Vishalam	
2003	Valathottu Thirinjal Nalamathe Veedu	Aji's mother	
2003	Parinamam	Sridevi	
2003	Kaliyodam	Devan's wife	
2004	Vamanapuram Bus Route	Bahuleyan's wife	
2004	Vajram	Nandu's mother	
2004	Runway	Chandy's wife	
2004	Mayilattam	Meenakshi's mother	
2004	Kakkakarumban	Radha	
2004	Youth Festival	Parvathy's mother	
2004	Mambazhakkalam	Kavitha's mother	
2004	Kathavasheshan	Renuka's mother	
2004	Rasikan	Madhavi	
2004	The Journey	Priya Kurup	
2004	Maratha Nadu	Thahira's mother	
2004	Priyam Priyamkaram	Abhirami's mother	
2004	Quotation	Anjali's mother	
2005	Iruvattam Manavaatti	Raghavan's wife	
2005	Kochi Rajavu	Bhavani	
2005	Five Fingers	Rafeeq's mother	
2005	Otta Nanayam	Aravindan's mother	
2005	Bus Conductor	Shamsudheen's wife	
2005	Udayon	Rarichan's wife	
2005	Lokanathan IAS	Koya's wife	
2005	Nerariyan CBI	Anitha's kin	
2005	Anandabhadram	Village lady	
2005	The Tiger	Home Secretary	
2005	Annorikkal	Benny's mother	
2005	Nomparam	Sarojini	
2005	Oru Naal Oru Kanavu	Sanjay's mother	
2006	Lion	Prasad's mother	
2006	Achanurangatha Veedu	Harikrishnan's mother	
2006	Vargam	Rahel	
2006	Thuruppu Gulan	Sreedharan Unnithan's wife	
2006	Raashtram	Janardhana Kurup's wife	
2006	Balram vs. Tharadas	Alex's wife	
2006	The Don	Anumol's mother	
2006	Oruvan	Sivan's step-mother	
2006	Photographer	Balan's wife	
2006	Parayam	Lekha's mother	
2006	Baba Kalyani	Women's Commission Member	
2006	Prajapathi	MLA Kuttikrishnana's wife	
2007	Changathipoocha	Thankamani	
2007	Payum Puli	Soosi Ninan	
2007	Speed Track	Arjun's mother	
2007	Abraham & Lincoln	Viji's mother	
2007	Nanma	Thara's mother	
2007	Indrajith	Shahina's mother	
2007	Hallo	Parvathy's kin	
2007	Paradesi	Moosa's mother	
2007	Chocolate	Rossie Abraham	
2007	Flash	Dhwani's kin	
2007	Romeoo	Dr.Priya's mother	
2007	Aakasham	Kanakam	
2007	Paranju Theeratha Visheshangal	Anjana's mother	
2007	Nazrani	Hostel warden	
2008	College Kumaran	College lecturer	
2008	Cycle	Jabbar's wife	
2008	Malabar Wedding	Smitha's mother	
2008	Shakespeare M.A. Malayalam	Pavithran's mother	
2008	One Way Ticket	Gomathi	
2008	Minnaminnikoottam	Abhilash's mother	
2008	Parunthu	Vinayan's mother	
2008	Veruthe Oru Bharya	Headmistress	
2008	Positive	Bus Passenger	
2008	Thavalam	Panicker's wife	
2008	Aayudham	Chief Secretary	
2008	Gulmohar	Lakshmi	
2008	Jubilee	Joji's sister	
2008	Chithrasalabhangalude Veedu	Muththu's mother	
2008	Anthiponvettam	Mathavi	
2008	SMS	Kalyani's mother	
2008	Mayabazar	Annamma	
2009	I G Inspector General	Chandini's mother	
2009	Vellathooval	Highrange Janu	
2009	Daddy Cool	Annie's mother	
2009	My Big Father	Proposed lady's mother	
2009	Calendar	Variyachan's wife	
2009	Duplicate	Sivankutty's mother	
2009	Swantham Lekhakan	Govindan's wife	
2009	Thirunakkara Perumal	Narayani	
2009	Kancheepurathe Kalyanam	Achuthankutty's mother	
2009	Katha Parayum Theruvoram	Neeraja's mother	
2009	Loudspeaker	Menon's relative	
2009	Chemistry	Anandu's mother	
2009	Kerala Cafe	Mother Superior	
2009	Chattambinadu	Murukan's mother	
2009	Violet	Suchithra's mother	
2009	Vairam: Fight for Justice	Albert's mother	
2010	Aagathan	Deepthi's mother	
2010	Nayakan	Vincent Karnavar's wife	
2010	Pulliman	School Principal	
2010	Ringtone	Meera's mother	
2010	Pokkiri Raja	Madhavan Nair's wife	
2010	Oru Naal Varum	Family Court Judge	
2010	Nallavan	Devaki	
2010	Neelambari	Saraswathi	
2010	Aathmakatha	Amina	
2010	Chekavar	Jyoti's mother	
2010	Koottukar	Achu's mother	
2010	Nizhal	Saradha	
2010	Avan	Appu's mother	
2010	Advocate Lakshmanan - Ladies Only	Thresia	
2010	Annarakkannanum Thannalayathu	Srimathi teacher	
2010	Nandhuni	Janu's mother	
2010	College Days	Joe's mother	
2010	Holidays	Vinod's mother	
2010	Karayilekku Oru Kadal Dooram	Janaki	
2010	Marykkundoru Kunjaadu	Ittichan's wife	
2010	Pusthakam	Rahul's mother	
2011	Ithu Nammude Katha	Remani	
2011	Byari	Muhammed's wife	
2011	Arjunan Sakshi	Anjali's mother	
2011	August 15	Ammini teacher	
2011	Manikiakkallu	Savithri teacher	
2011	White & Black	Muslim lady	
2011	Swargam 9 KM	Lady	
2011	Three Kings	Shankaran Unni's mother	
2011	Mohabbath	Ameer's mother	
2011	Adaminte Makan Abu	Nalini	
2011	Salt N' Pepper	Nafeesa	
2011	Sevenes	Gowri's mother	
2011	Kadhayile Nayika	Maya's mother	
2011	Naayika	Young Gracy's mother	
2012	Casanovva	Sister Margratt	
2012	Nidra	Priya's mother	
2012	Mayamohini	Saraswathi Antharjanam	
2012	Ordinary	Saradha teacher	
2012	Veendum Kannur	Madayi Surendran's wife	
2012	Grandmaster	Rajasekhar's mother	
2012	Vaadhyar	Hema's mother	
2012	Cinema Company	Paul's mother	
2012	Ivan Megharoopan	Ammini's mother	
2012	MLA Mani: Patham Classum Gusthiyum	MLA Lakshmi Priya's mother	
2012	Mr. Marumakan	Ambika	
2012	Parudeesa	Authachan's wife	
2012	Navagatharkku Swagatham	Rajasekharan's relative	
2012	Crime Story	Hari's mother	
2012	Ayalum Njanum Thammil	Mary	
2012	Banking Hours 10 to 4	Bhavani	
2012	Prabhuvinte Makkal	Devika's mother	
2012	Dhanyam	Sumithra teacher	
2012	Gruhanathan	Doctor	
2012	Scene Onnu Nammude Veedu	Shyamala teacher	
2012	Ennennum Ormmaykkaayi	Sidharthan's mother	
2013	Proprietors: Kammath & Kammath	Maheswari	
2013	Cowboy	Vinay's mother	
2013	Rebecca Uthup Kizhakkemala	Janaky	
2013	Red Wine	Elsey	
2013	Sound Thoma	SI Rajesh's aunt	
2013	Shwaasam	Najeem's mother	
2013	Bharya Athra Pora	Family Court Judge	
2013	Black Ticket	Martin's mother	
2013	Sringara Velan	Savithri	
2013	Good Idea	Lady	
2013	Radio	Swetha's mother	
2013	Geethaanjali	Anoop's mother	
2013	Careebeyans	Viswanathan's mother	
2013	Ezhu Sundara Rathrikal	Susannamma	
2013	Thekku Thekkoru Deshathu	Lady	
2013	Signal	Neethu's mother	
2013	Abduvinte Swantham Ammakku	Lady	
2013	Sudoku	Lady	
2014	1983	Manjula's mother	
2014	Parayan Baaki Vechathu	Eliyaamma	
2014	Naattarangu	Omanakuttiyamma	
2014	On The Way	Sudhi's mother	
2014	To Let Ambadi Talkies	Manu's mother	
2014	Call Me @	Lakshmiyamma	
2014	Iniyum Ethra Dooram	Usha	
2014	Avatharam	Saraswathy	
2014	Bhaiyya Bhaiyya	Babumon's mother	
2014	Villali Veeran	Aruna's mother	
2014	Mizhi Thurakku	Kudukki	
2014	Central Theater	Sidharth Vijay's mother	
2014	Money Ratnam	Nun	
2014	Ithihasa	Sulochana	
2014	Seconds	Parvathy's mother	
2015	Rasam	Mrs. Thirumeni	
2015	Elinjikkavu P.O	Thresiamma	
2015	Thinkal Muthal Velli Vare	Pushpavalli's aunt	
2015	Aashamsakalode Anna	Nun	
2015	Wonderful Journey	Lady	
2015	Ithinumappuram	Rukmini's mother	
2015	Thaarakangale Saakshi	Sudha	
2015	Kanal	Revathy's mother	
2015	Rani Padmini	Padmini's mother	
2015	Salt Mango Tree	School Principal	
2015	Ormakalil Oru Manjukaalam	Savithri	
2015	Ore Oru Mokka Raja	Susheela	
2016	Action Hero Biju	Benitta's relative	
2016	Sahapadi 1975	Sumathiamma	
2016	Plus or Minus	Professor Malathy	
2016	Happy Wedding	Hari's mother	
2016	Karinkunnam 6'S	Mousin's mother	
2016	Kattappanayile Rithwik Roshan	Jio's mother	
2016	Girls/Thiraikku Varadha Kathai	Merlin's mother	
2016	Romanov	Nazriya's mother	
2016	Koppayile Kodumkattu	Narendran's mother	
2016	Pallikoodam	Mother Superior	
2016	Mallanum Mathevanum	Sowdhamini	
2017	Melle	Reji's mother	
2017	Munthirivallikal Thalirkkumbol	Priya's mother	
2017	Role Models	Anjali's mother	
2017	Rakshadhikari Baiju Oppu	Janaki	
2017	Avarude Raavukal	Siddharth's mother	
2017	Viswasapoorvam Mansoor	Lakshmikuttiyamma	
2017	Masterpiece	Herself	
2017	Sadrusya Vaakyam 24:29	Mother Mariya	
2017	Goodalochana	Praksahan's mother	
2017	Hello Dubaikkaran	Parvathy	
2017	Neeranjanapookkal	Janaki	
2017	Chicken Kokkachi	Kallu's mother	
2018	Thenichayum Peerangippadayum	Mariyamma	
2018	Lolans	Annamma	
2018	Vikadakumaran	Sukumaran's wife	
2018	Captain	Anitha's mother	
2018	Mohanlal	Meenakshi's mother (old)	
2018	Moonnara	Lakshmi Amma	
2018	Premanjali	Vishal's mother	
2018	Marubhoomiyile Mazhathullikal	Annoyed guy's mother	
2018	Ashiq Vanna Divasam	Mariya	
2018	Theetta Rappai	Elizabeth	
2018	Ippozhum Eppozhum Shuthiyayirikkatte	Actress Reena's mother	
2018	Johny Johny Yes Appa	Nandana's grandmother	
2018	Mafi Dona	Vivek's mother	
2018	369	Rithu's mother	
2018	Karwaan	Latha Nambiar	
2019	Kalippu	Shantha	
2019	Isakkinte Ithihasam	Margi	
2019	Daivam Sakshi	Sudha	
2019	Janaadhipan	Kannur Vishwan's mother	
2019	Ningal Camera Nireekshanathilanu	Babu's wife	
2019	Big Salute	Treesa	
2019	Poovalliyum Kunjadum	Thresiamma	
2019	Mr. & Ms. Rowdy	Varghsese's wife	
2019	Oru Nakshathramulla Aakasham	Lady	
2019	Madhaveeyam	Dr. Indira	
2019	Swarnamalsyangal	Lady	
2019	Kumbarees	Aneeta	
2019	Varthakal Ithuvare	Vinayachandran's mother	
2020	Shylock	Meenakshi Ammal	
2020	Paapam Cheyyathavar Kalleriyatte	Marykutti	
2021	Black Coffee	Mrs. Sankar	
2021	Illom	Sreedevi	
2021	Cabin	Sulochana	
2021	Kaaval	Annamma	
2022	Kannadi		
2022	Lalitham Sundaram	Sr. Mariya	
2022	Varayan	Daisy's mother	
2022	Ulkazcha	HM Rema Devi	
2022	Porkkalam		
2022	Ulkkanal		
2022	Chathuram	Ex-wife of Eldhose	
2023	Experiment 5		
2023	Voice of Sathyanathan	Vaidyar's patient	
2023	Mr. Hacker		
2023	Mea Culpa	Ammachi	
2024	Badal		
2024	Swargathile Katturumbu		
2024	Kaalavarshakattu		
2024	Thankamani	Chakkarayammachi	
2025	Besty		
2025	Moonnam Nombaram	Sarah	

== Short films and albums ==
List of Ambika Mohan short films and albums credits
Year	Project	Role	Genre
2001	Chingapenninu Kannezhuthan	Amma	Album
2008	Jeevadhaara	Grandmother	Album
2011	Saranayathra	Ammamma	Album
2012	Snehapoorvam	Lakshmiamma	Short film
2013	Grameenakunkumam	Actress	Album
2013	Gramasindhooram	Old lady	Album
2016	Black Hole	Rony's mother	Short film
2016	Vallarpadthettam Imbamayi Vazhunna; Vallabhamulloru Chempakame	Meenakshi Amma	Short film
2016	Kriya	Doctor	Short film
2017	Ponnathira	Amma	Album
2019	Sunilinte Swantham Appoos	Sunil's mother	Short film
2019	Sri Rama Rama	Devotee	Album
2020	Six Feet Under	Deepu's Amma	Short film
2020	Lock Downaaya Onam	Amma	Short film
2021	The Law	Mrs. Ramanandhan	Short film
2021	Ente Sunnath Kalyanam	Rahman's mother	Short film
2021	Krishnavaibhavam	Devotee	Album

== Television ==
=== TV serials ===
List of Ambika Mohan television serial credits
Year	Project	Role	Channel	Notes
	Pettamma	Lalitha	DD Malayalam	
	Anantham	Savithri	DD Malayalam	
2001	Durga	Actress		Debut TV serial
2005	Krishnakripasagaram	Upasenapathni	Amrita TV	
2006	Sagaram	Teacheramma	Doordarshan	
2006–2007	Swantham Suryaputhri	Actress	Asianet	
2007	Mizhiyoram	Actress	Kerala Vision	
2007	Aa Amma	Actress	Kairali TV	
2007–2008	Thulabharam	Shanthamma	Asianet	
2007–2008	Chilluvilakku	Actress	Surya TV	
2007–2008	Velankani Mathavu	Mariyakutty/Vareed's wife	Surya TV	
2008	Manasariyathe	Actress	Surya TV	
2008	Kadamattathachan	Ouseph's wife	Surya TV	
2009–2011	Paarijatham	Mohan's mother	Asianet	
2009	Adiparasakthi	Madhavan's mother	Surya TV	
2009	Chandrettanum Shobedathiyum	Actress	Asianet	
2010	Indraneelam	Sathi	Surya TV	
2010	Mattoruval	Saralamma	Surya TV	
2011–2012	Parinayam	Actress	Mazhavil Manorama	
2011–2013	Chakravakam	Lakshmi Raghu	Surya TV	
2012	Akashadoothu	Indran's mother	Surya TV	
2012	Sreepadmanabham	Thanka's mother	Amrita TV	
2012	Chandralekha	Lakshmi	Asianet	
2013	Vallarpaadathamma	Actress	Shalom TV	
2013	Aayirathil Oruval	Doctor	Mazhavil Manorama	
2013	Geethanjali	Nandan's mother	Surya TV	
2013	Amala	Radhamani (Amala's mother)	Mazhavil Manorama	Extended cameo
2013	Makal	Sumangalamma	Surya TV	
2014–2015	Balamani	Mandodari Teacher	Mazhavil Manorama	
2014	Kerala Cafe	Herself	Kairali TV	Sitcom; Guest role
2014–2015	Balaganapathy	Aayamma	Asianet	
2014–2015	Ennu Swantham Koottukari	Mansoor's mother	Mazhavil Manorama	
2015	Aathira	Aathira's mother	Sun TV	Tamil Serial
2015	Dhathuputhri	Vasundhara	Mazhavil Manorama	
2015–2016	4 the People	Rosamma	Asianet	
2015–2017	Eeran Nilavu	Hariprasad's mother	Flowers TV	Replaced by Deepika Mohan
2015–2016	Malootty	Mayadevi's mother	Mazhavil Manorama	
2016	Sagaram Sakshi	Sivakami's mother	Surya TV	
2016–2017	Chinthavishtayaya Seetha	Kamala Narayanan	Asianet	
2017	Seetha	Nalini	Flowers TV	Replaced by Roslin
2017–2019	Sthreepadham	Sudhalakshmi	Mazhavil Manorama	
2018	Police	Deepu's mother	ACV	
2019	Ilayaval Gayathri	Sreedhari	Mazhavil Manorama	
2019	Vishudha Geevarghese Punyalan	Actress	Jeevan TV	
2019	Sumangali Bhava	Santhamma Vasudevan	Zee Keralam	Cameo Appearance
2019	Puttum Kattanum	Herself	Kairali TV	Sitcom; Guest appearance
2020–2021	Jeevitha Nouka	Jayakrishnan's mother	Mazhavil Manorama	Photo presence
2020	Ente Maathavu	Reethaamma (Helen's mother)	Surya TV	
2020–2023	Padatha Painkili	Susheela Devi	Asianet	
2021	Pookkalam Varavayi	Legal counselor	Zee Keralam	
2021	Priyankari	Welfare officer	Flowers TV	
2023	Sita Ramam	Bharathi	Surya TV	
2023–2024	Anuraga Ganam Pole	Lakshmi	Zee Keralam	
2024	Swargavaathil Pakshi	Saraswathy	Surya TV	
2024-2025	Apoorvaragam	Bhargavi	Zee Keralam	
2024	Meenu's Kitchen	Herself	Mazhavil Manorama	
2025	Etho Janma Kalpanayil	Indira	Asianet	
2026-present	Pranayavilasam		Zee Keralam	

=== Other shows ===
List of Ambika Mohan television show credits
Year	Project	Role	Channel	Genre/Notes
2006	Mothiram	Kunhikavu	Doordarshan	Telefilm
2008	Vanitharatnam	Herself	Amrita TV	Reality show
2009	Moonoottante Onam	Actress	Surya TV	Telefilm
2011	Umma Ariyatha Katha	Umma	Kairali TV	Telefilm
2012	Onaruchi	Presenter	Jeevan TV	Cookery show
2012	Atma Suryotsavam	Herself	Surya TV	Stage show
2015	Shoot an Idea Contest	Herself	Kappa TV	Reality show
2015	Gulumal	Herself	Surya TV	Prank show
2018	Vishukaineettam	Host	Flowers	Special programme
2018	Onapayasam	Presenter	Kaumudy TV	Cookery show
2020	Dany's	Sr. Mereena	Goodness TV	Telefilm
2022	Ammamarude Samsthana Sammelanam	Herself	Flowers TV	Special show
2022	Oh My God	Herself	Kaumudy TV	Prank show
