= Chandrettan Evideya =

2015 Indian film directed by Sidharth Bharathan

- Theatrical poster
- Directed by: Sidharth Bharathan
- Written by: Santhosh Echikkanam
- Produced by: Sameer Thahir; Shyju Khalid; Ashiq Usman
- Starring: Dileep; Anusree; Namitha Pramod; Soubin Shahir; Chemban Vinod Jose; Vinayakan
- Cinematography: Shyju Khalid
- Edited by: Bavan Sreekumar
- Music by: Prashant Pillai
- Production company: Handmade Films
- Distributed by: Kalasangham Films; Popcorn Entertainments (Asia Pacific release)
- Release date: 1 May 2015
- Running time: 120 minute
- Country: India
- Language: Malayalam
- Budget: ₹3 crore
- Box office: ₹7 crore

Chandrettan Evideya (transl. Where is Chandrettan) is a 2015 Malayalam-language romantic fantasy comedy film directed by Sidharth Bharathan. The film was produced by Sameer Thahir, Shyju Khalid and Ashiq Usman. It stars Dileep alongside Anusree and Namitha Pramod in the main roles. It is the second directorial of Sidharth. The story and screenplay is penned by noted author Santhosh Echikkanam who had teamed up with Sidharth in his directorial debut Nidra (2012). The songs are composed by Prashant Pillai. Cinematography is handled by Shyju Khalid and editing by Bavan Sreekumar. The costumes are designed by Mashar T Hamsa.

== Plot ==
Chandramohan is a Government employee and an ardent classical dance follower. His wife Sushama is also a Govt employee but located far away from Chandramohan. She keeps asking for a transfer but never get it and she is overly involved in as a wife in every thing her husband does.

Chandramohan is a well known critic of classical dance. He reviews young classical dancers and his reviews are often published in magazines. Sushama expresses her dislikes and keeps close tabs on him. One day they decide to go for a family trip to Thanjavur where they meet a Nadi Astrologer who tells them the love story of Chandramohan's previous life which took place 1000 years ago.

Velkozhukottuvan was a poet in Raja Raja Chozhan's court. He meets Vasanthmallika a dancer from Madurai who visits Raja Raj Chozhan's Sabha. They both fall for each other in their 1st sight. This relationship disturbs the king. He sends Velkozhukottuvan to war where he gets stomped on by an elephant and gets killed.

The astrologer says that there might be possibilities for Chandran to meet Vasanthmallika and reunite in this era. Although Chandran finds it silly, Sushama is disturbed. His friends motivates him for pursuing an extramarital life as it is natural for every man. A convinced Chandran, who is going through a midlife crisis himself, and starts to perceive hallucinations of Velkozhukottuvan.

One day he meets a woman named Geetanjali in his office who comes to meet Chandran claiming to be his fan. But it is later revealed that she is a government doctor who has been receiving many complaints. She pleads to Chandramohan to postpone the complaint documents for 2 months as she is having a dance program in Germany. After knowing that she is a devoted dancer, he is convinced that she is Vasanthmallika. They both grow in their relationship and constantly have outings. One day after a dinner he sees Sushama in his home and gets to know that she has got her transfer.

Sushama starts doubting Chandran because of his strange behavior especially after he had left them at a supermarket to go and meet Geetanjali who had been hospitalized. Knowing this Chandran changes the contact name in his phone from Geetanjali to Geetanandhan.

One day, Sushama asks Chandramohan where he is over the phone and he mentions that he is in his office, But sees Chandran in a restaurant with Geetanjali. She checks his phone and gets to know that he has been calling 'Geetanandhan' frequently. She copies the number and calls from her mobile and gets to know that the name is fake as she heard a women's voice. She gets to know the original details using the number. Sushama calls her telling that she's a fan and also wishes to meet her. After knowing she is in a Travel Agency, she spots Chandran with her, follows them confirming her suspicions.

Geetanjali and Chandran decide to finally meet the next night before she leaves. Sushama confronts Chandran by a big dispute in her house about his whereabouts and his lies. In a rage he leaves his house. Sushama goes to Geetanjali's house and reveals she is Chandran's wife and tells the truth of Chandran's fantasy about his past life. Sushama mentions that if Chandran comes to Geetanjali's house at night then she would never interfere with their lives again and vice versa.

At the very same night Chandran goes to Geetanjali's house. Sushama prays very ardently. As he was nearing the door, Chandran hears a baby crying and remembers his son and decides to go back to his home. Seeing this relieves Sushama and Geetanjali is left in tears. Later it is shown that Chandramohan deletes Geetanjali's number and attends Sushama's phone call.

== Cast ==
- Dileep in a dual role as:
  - Chandramohan Mattanur
  - Velkozhukottuvan, killed by Rajaraja Cholan
- Anusree as Sushama Chandramohan
- Namitha Pramod in a dual role as:
  - Dr. Geethanjali S Iyer
  - Vasanthamallika
- Mukesh as Shekhar Menon
- Suraj Venjaramoodu as Narayanan Ilayath
- Soubin Shahir as Sumesh
- Chemban Vinod Jose as Janan
- K. P. A. C. Lalitha as Valsala
- Vinayakan as Rajaraja Cholan
- Veena Nair as Vanaja
- Master Ilhan as Ashwin (Achu)
- Dileesh Pothan as Nadi Jyothishi
- Sruthibala as Vyjayathi Ramanathan
- Ambika Ravu as Premalatha
- Kochu Preman as Issac Eppan
- Janaki Sreenivasan as Mrinalini Sharangapani
- Naseer Sankranthi as Auto driver

== Production ==
The film was jointly produced by Sameer Thahir, Shyju Khalid and Ashiq Usman under the banner of Hand Made Filmz. Vedhika was initially cast to play one among the female leads alongside Dileep and Anusree but later she backed out because of her busy schedule and later Namitha Pramod was roped in for that role. The film also stars KPAC Lalitha in a pivotal role. The official trailer for the movie was released on 10 April 2015.

== Soundtrack ==
The film's soundtrack contains 2 songs, all composed by Prashant Pillai and Lyrics by Santhosh Varma.

#	Title	Singer(s)
1	"Vasanthamallike"	Haricharan, Preethi Pillai
2	"Kinaavin Kilikal"	Preethi Pillai

== Reception ==
=== Critical reception ===
The film started with positive reviews and stated the return of Dileep in kerala box office.Filmibeat.com rated 3.0 out of 5 stars and said the film brings back the vintage Dileep in full swing. And praised the script which has all ingredients for a perfect entertainer, and the brilliant cinematography makes it a visual treat and also appreciated the songs especially Vasanthamallike and background score which perfectly sinks in with the interesting plot and flow of the screenplay. And concluded "Strongly recommended to the audience who love to watch family entertainers". Malayala Manorama rated 3.5 out of 5 stars while appreciating the script, songs and background score especially mentioning the song Vasanthamallike, and ellaborated "The best part about the movie is that it frees Dileep, the actor, from the unrealistic comic stereotypes which have been proving to be suicidal for him for quite sometime now. The film, with a strong base on middle-class realism, treads the popular narrative line even as it carefully tries to refrain from going after the commercial formula, a genre in which the master-duo Bharathan and Padmarajan and the likes have excelled", and concluded "Chandrettan Evideya is for those who value familial bonds, a type which constitutes the majority of movie-goers in this part of the world.

Metromatinee.com gave a positive review stating "The film is refreshing in the sense that after a while actor Dileep has opted out of the run of the mill. Dileep the actor comes to the fore after a while and director Sidharth Bharathan deserves a fair bit of credit for it". The Times of India awarded 3 out of 5 stars and stated "Sidharth Bharathan steps away from his father's shadow and displays sparks that have the potential to help him carve a niche in the industry. Nevertheless, Chandrettan Evideya is a clean, family watch and a throwback to the times when Dileep movies meant sterling, genuine entertainers.". Indiaglitz.com opinion was to "Watch this movie without expecting a usual Dileep fare. ‘Chandretan Evideya’ is definitely a good watch that can leave you entertained. Siddarth Bharathan has nailed it with this simple tale.". Sify.com gave a verdict "Good" and said "Chandrettan Evideya has nothing much to offer that you have not seen before but even then, it has been presented attractively. In those times when there is very little to choose in terms of good cinema, this one could give you enough to leave the theatre with a smile. Watch this one!".

=== Box office ===
IB Times said the film got decent opening at the box office and overwhelming response from theatres in first weekend. The film grossed approximately ₹1.84 crores within 3 days of release. The film became a moderate hit and marked a good comeback for Dileep.

== Awards and nominations ==
- Filmfare Awards South
- Nominated - Filmfare Award for Best Actress - Malayalam - Anusree
- Nominated - Filmfare Award for Best Supporting Actress - Malayalam - Namitha Pramod
- IIFA UTSAVAM
- Nominated - IIFA UTSAVAM Award for Best Supporting Actress - Malayalam - Namitha Pramod
- Nominated - IIFA UTSAVAM Award for Best Female Playback Singer - Malayalam - Preeti Nair

== Home media ==
The VCD&DVD of Chandrettan Evideya was released by AP International and marketed by EMPIRE
