= Rebecca Uthup Kizhakkemala =

- Film poster
- Directed by: Sundar Das
- Written by: V C Ashok
- Produced by: Venketesh S Upadhyaya
- Starring: Ann Augustine; Jishnu Raghavan; Siddharth Bharathan
- Cinematography: Jibu Jacob
- Edited by: Bijith Bala
- Music by: Ratheesh Vega
- Production company: Upadhyaya films
- Release date: 7 March 2013
- Country: India
- Language: Malayalam

Rebecca Uthup Kizhakkemala is a 2013 Malayalam film directed by Sundardas. It stars Ann Augustine, Jishnu and Siddharth Bharathan Kalabhavan Mani, Sai Kumar in the lead roles. It marks the third collaboration of Jishnu Raghavan and Sidharth after they worked together in Nammal (2002) and Nidra (2012) and second collaboration of Jishnu and Ann Augustine after Ordinary (2012). It was the last feature film of Jishnu Raghavan in Malayalam prior to his sudden demise.

== Cast ==
- Ann Augustine as Rebecca Uthup
  - Nandhana Varma as Young Rebecca
- Sai Kumar as Uthup: Rebecca's father
- Shari as Sosamma: Rebecca's mother
- Shaalin Zoya as Chinnamma: Rebecca's sister
- Jishnu Raghavan as Kuruvila Kattingal: Rebecca's ex-fiancé
- Siddharth Bharathan as Arjun: Rebecca's love interest and husband
- Nirmal Jacob as Ummen Koshy alias JK: Rebecca's neighbour and One-sided lover
- Niyas Backer as Jk's friend
- Suraj Venjaramoodu as Balan: Jk's sidekick
- Augustine as Vicar
- Kalabhavan Mani as Gabriel: Asst. Vicar
- Kalabhavan Shajon as Mathachan
- Sasi Kalinga as Raman Nair
- Manju Sateesh as Kuruvila's aunt
- P. Sreekumar as Joseph Kutty: Kuruvila's uncle
- Shanawas as Charlie: Sosamma's brother
- Sukumari as Sosamma's mother
- Chembil Ashokan as Avarachan
