= Renadive =

Indian cinematographer

- Born: 30 May 1979; Kunnamkulam, Kerala, India
- Other name: Renu
- Occupation: Cinematographer
- Years active: 1999–present
- Spouse: Sufitha
- Children: 2

Renu, professionally credited as Renadive is an Indian cinematographer, who works in Malayalam cinema.

== Early life ==
Born in Kunnamkulam, on 30 August 1979 as the son of Kallayil Vijayaraghavan, a photographer and Shyamala Vijayaraghavan. Renu holds a diploma in still photography from Indian Institute of Photography. He has worked for Kairali TV channel as a cameraman and covered 148 episodes of Verittakazhchakal with V. K. Sreeraman.

== Career ==
In 2006, he joined cinematographer Alagappan as an assistant cinematographer for the film Agnisakshi (1999 film), followed by films such as Photographer (film), Novel (film), Thalappavu. Later he joined cinematographer Jibu Jacob and worked with him in movies namely Shakespeare M.A. Malayalam, Pranayakalam, and Heartbeats. In 2007 he joined the team of Big B (film) and worked as an assistant cinematographer to Sameer Thahir. He also worked in Anwar (2010 film) as an assistant cinematographer. From there on he has been a part of every movie directed and produced by Amal Neerad. He debuted as a Cinematographer in 5 Sundarikal, an anthology of 5 movies directed by different directors in which he was the DOP for Kullante Bharya. He was the Associate cameraman and operating cameraman for the Amal Neerad venture Iyobinte Pusthakam. He has done the Cinematography for Amal Neerad's Comrade in America.

== Filmography ==
=== As cinematographer ===
Key
†	Denotes films that have not yet been released

Year	Title	Director	Notes
2013	5 Sundarikal	Amal Neerad	
2017	Comrade in America	Amal Neerad	
2019	Vijay Superum Pournamiyum	Jis Joy	
2019	Argentina Fans Kaattoorkadavu	Midhun Manuel Thomas	
2020	Shylock	Ajai Vasudev	
2022	Palthu Janwar	Sangeeth P Rajan	
2023	Antony	Joshiy	
2025	Ennu Swantham Punyalan	Mahesh Madhu	
2025	Prince and Family	Binto Stephen	
2025	JSK: Janaki V v/s State of Kerala	Pravin Narayanan	
2025	Vilayath Buddha	Jayan Nambiar	Co-cinematography by Arvind S Kashyap
2026	Kattalan	Paul George	
2026	Prempaatta †	Aamir Pallikkal	

=== As assistant cinematographer ===
Year	Title	Director
2005	Rasathanthram	Sathyan Anthikad
2006	Photographer	Ranjan Pramod
2007	Big B	Amal Neerad
2007	Pranayakalam	Uday Ananthan
2007	Novel	East Coast Vijayan
2007	Thalappavu	Madhupal
2008	Heartbeats	
2009	Sagar Alias Jacky Reloaded	Amal Neerad
2009	Shakespeare M.A. Malayalam	Shyju, Shaji

=== As associate cinematographer ===
Year	Title	Director
2010	Anwar	Amal Neerad
2012	Bachelor Party	Amal Neerad
2014	Iyobinte Pusthakam	Amal Neerad
