= Vela (film) =

2023 Indian crime drama film

- Theatrical release poster
- Directed by: Syam Sasi
- Written by: M. Sajas
- Produced by: George Sebastian
- Starring: Shane Nigam; Sunny Wayne; Sidharth Bharathan
- Cinematography: Suresh Rajan
- Edited by: Mahesh Bhuvanend
- Music by: Sam C. S.
- Production companies: Cyn-Cyl Celluloid; Badusha Productions
- Distributed by: Wayfarer Films (Kerala); Truth Global Films (Overseas)
- Release date: 10 November 2023
- Running time: 148 minutes
- Country: India
- Language: Malayalam

Vela (transl. Job) is a 2023 Indian Malayalam-language crime drama film directed by Syam Sasi (in his directorial debut). It stars Shane Nigam and Sunny Wayne in the lead roles, alongside Siddharth Bharathan and Aditi Balan. The story is set in a police control room in Palladium.

Principal photography commenced in June 2022 in Palakkad. The music was composed by Sam C. S., while the cinematography and editing were handled by Suresh Rajan and Mahesh Bhuvanend. This movie is a loosely based on movie The Guilty (2018)

Vela was released in theatres on 10 November 2023.

== Cast ==
- Shane Nigam as CPO Ullas Augustin
- Sunny Wayne as SI Mallikarjunan
- Sidharth Bharathan as CI Ashok Kumar
- Aditi Balan
- Bipin Perumbilli as KK
- M. Sajas as Askar

== Production ==
The script was written by M. Sajas, who previously worked in Mandharam (2018). In an interview with The New Indian Express, M. Sajas said that he wrote the script for the film based on some real-life incidents faced by his father, who was a former police officer. He also got information from some active police officers. The film was produced by George Sebastian under the banner of Cyn-Cyl Celluloid. Suresh Rajan and Mahesh Bhuvanend were recruited as the cinematographer and editor. In an interview with OTTPlay, Sidharth Bharathan said that he was offered the role of a sub-inspector by Syam Sasi before the release of his directorial Chathuram (2022). Principal photography began on 18 June 2022 in Palakkad with a customary puja ceremony. The film also marks the directorial debut of Syam Sasi.

== Music ==
The music and background score was composed by Sam C. S. The audio rights were acquired by T-Series. The first song "Paathakal" was sung by Haricharan and written by Anwar Ali.

Track listing
No.	Title	Lyrics	Singer(s)	Length
1.	"Paathakal"	Anwar Ali	Haricharan	3:29
2.	"Bambadiyo"	Anwar Ali	Sam C. S., Anthony Daasan	3:21
Total length:				6:50

== Release ==
It was previously reported that the film would be released in 2022. The film was released in theatres on 10 November 2023. It was distributed in Kerala by Dulquer Salmaan's Wayfarer Films and internationally by Truth Global Films.

== Reception ==
=== Critical response ===
S. R. Praveen of The Hindu wrote, "Vela sets up an intriguing premise, but fails to make use of it with things fizzling out in the end." Princy Alexander of Onmanorama wrote, "'Vela' delves into the mystery of the missing boy case by placing two policemen with contrasting ethics at the heart of the drama."

Cris of The News Minute gave 3 out of 5 stars and wrote, "'Vela' is the kind of film that you'd tell someone about as, alright, nothing huge, but keeps you interested." Times Now gave 3 out of 5 stars and wrote, "With a well-crafted screenplay and dialogues by M. Sajas, expert editing by Mahesh Bhuvanend, and captivating cinematography by Suresh Rajan, Vela is poised to leave a lasting impression as a standout thriller."

Anandu Suresh of The Indian Express gave 2.5 out of 5 stars and wrote, "Vela is one of those movies that offers a rare experience, thanks in large part to Shane Nigam and Sunny Wayne's remarkable performances, but is hindered by a scarcity of engaging moments." Sajin Shrijith of Cinema Express gave 3.5 out of 5 stars and wrote, "Vela is most gripping when the two actors spew venom at each other."

== Accolades ==
Year	Award	Category	Recipient	Ref.
2023	Kerala Film Critics Association Awards	Best Supporting Actor	Shane Nigam	
