= Chathuram =

- Theatrical release poster
- Directed by: Siddharth Bharathan
- Written by: Siddharth Bharathan; Vinay Thomas
- Produced by: Sidharth Bharathan; Vinitha Ajith; George Sandiagio; Jamneesh Thayyil
- Starring: Swasika; Roshan Mathew; Alencier Ley Lopez; Jaffar Idukki
- Cinematography: Pradeesh M. Varma
- Edited by: Deepu S. Joseph
- Music by: Prashant Pillai
- Distributed by: Greenwich Entertainments; Yellove Bird Productions
- Release date: 4 November 2022
- Country: India
- Language: Malayalam

Chathuram (transl. The Square) is a 2022 Indian Malayalam-language drama thriller film directed by Sidharth Bharathan, starring Swasika, Roshan Mathew, Alencier Ley Lopez, and Leona Lishoy. The film was released in theaters on 4 November 2022.

On February 17, 2023, regional OTT platform Saina Play announced that they had acquired the digital rights to Chathuram and began streaming it from March 9, 2023.

== Cast ==
- Roshan Mathew as Home Nurse Bellthazar
- Alencier Ley Lopez as Eldhos Achayan
- Swasika as Selena, Achayan's second wife
- Jaffar Idukki as John, Achayan's brother
- Ambika Mohan as Achayan's first wife
- Ritu Ajith as Achayan's daughter
- Nishanth Sagar as Adv. Roni Zacheria
- Santhy Balachandran as Jijimol
- Leona Lishoy as CI Meritta Philip
- Gilu Joseph as Joseph
- Geethi Sangeetha as Rathi
- Amalsha as Jobish
- Vinoy Thomas as Baby
- Vinod Krishnan as Bell's brother
- Kichu Tellus as SI
- Smitha Mohan as Civil Police Officer
- Rajiv Mohan as Civil Police Officer
- Anuroop as Civil Police Officer
- Jeril Varghese as Priest

== Reception ==
Chathuram received mixed-to-positive reviews from critics, who praised the lead performances, though its pacing and use of thriller clichés drew criticism.

=== Critical response ===
The Times of India gave the film 3/5 stars, describing it as "as rarely seen emotional drama" and commending the lead performances, while also pointing out the occasionally sluggish pace. OTTPlay gave the film 3/5 stars, praising Swasika Vijay and Roshan Mathew's performances, but felt that the film "takes far too much to get over the predictable portions to better bits". Film Companion wrote it was "a femme-fatale drama that trolls for attention", relying on "the oldest tricks in the erotic thriller manual", though the film's mood and atmosphere were praised. The New Indian Express called it "a fairly enjoyable noir-tinged dark comedy", praising Swasika Vijay as a "revelation as the vamp who oscillates between confident and vulnerable" and Roshan Mathew as "a natural" in his role. Indian Express Malayalam noted the film didn't stray far from familiar erotic thriller tropes, but acknowledged its discussion of body, desire, and power dynamics in style rarely seen in Malayalam cinema.
