= Daas (2005 film) =

- Theatrical release poster
- Directed by: Babu Yogeswaran
- Written by: Babu Yogeswaran
- Produced by: K. Muralitharan; V. Swaminathan; G. Venugopal
- Starring: Ravi Mohan; Renuka Menon
- Cinematography: Vijay K. Chakravarthy; Srinivas Devamsam
- Edited by: Anthony
- Music by: Yuvan Shankar Raja
- Production company: Lakshmi Movie Makers
- Release date: 29 July 2005
- Running time: 155 minutes
- Country: India
- Language: Tamil

Daas is a 2005 Indian Tamil-language romantic action film written and directed by newcomer Babu Yogeswaran. The film stars Ravi Mohan (credited as Jayam Ravi) and Renuka Menon in lead and Vadivelu, Adithya Menon, Shanmugarajan, Monica, Abhinay, and Salim Ghouse, among others, in supporting roles. The film's score and soundtrack are composed by Yuvan Shankar Raja. The film released on 29 July 2005 and become a commercial success.

== Plot ==
The film begins in a small village in Tirunelveli district where a few upper-caste men hold a chariot festival. Antony Daas, along with his friends, pulls the chariot into their slum. The friends naturally incur the wrath of a local leader named Annachi. Meanwhile, his daughter Rajeshwari falls in love with Daas. Her sister Punitha elopes to marry a lower-caste boy named Guna, who is a classmate of Daas. Coming to know about this, Annachi sends his men to bump off Punitha and Guna. He eventually sets them ablaze in front of Daas. An angry Rajeshwari, in order to teach her father a lesson, elopes with Daas and vows to get married. The couple then seeks refuge in Nasser's house in Madurai. He promises to get them married. However, coming to know about their hideout, Annachi's men reach Madurai to foil their plans. Nasser's father promises to get them united. Enters Nasser's brother Anwar, who plans to let loose terror in the Madurai town in the name of Jehad. How Daas emerges triumphant from all the troubles and marries Rajeshwari forms the rest of the story.

== Cast ==
- Jayam Ravi as Antony Daas
- Renuka Menon as Rajeshwari (Daas's love interest)
- Vadivelu as Navagragam (College Hostel Warden)
- Seetha as Sevanthi (Rajeshwari's mother)
- Shanmugarajan as Annachi (Rajeshwari's father)
- Adithya Menon as Anwar
- Monica as Punitha (Rajeshwari's sister)
- Abhinay as Guna (Punitha's love interest)
- Salim Ghouse as Vaappa (Naseer's Father)
- Five Star Krishna as Naseer (Anwar's brother)
- Livingston as Allapichai
- Pithamagan Mahadevan as Minister Gurumoorthy
- FEFSI Vijayan as Police Officer
- Tharika as Maimun
- Nirosha
- Thyagu
- Singamuthu
- Pondy Ravi as Makkal Theerpu reporter
- Citizen Mani

== Production ==
Daas, the directorial debut of Babu Yogeswaran, was initially titled Rascal. It is Ravi's third film and his first original film following two remakes. Since he plays a footballer, he took training in the sport. While Ravi dismissed reports of his brother Raja having "ghost-directed" the film, he said Raja did offer some suggestions. The filming was held at Pollachi for 25 days while the climax was shot at MGR Engineering College for 15 days.

== Soundtrack ==
The soundtrack was composed by Yuvan Shankar Raja. The song "Vaa Vaa" was reused from "Adiye Manam Nilluna Nikkathadi", composed by Yuvan's father Ilaiyaraaja for the 1984 film Neengal Kettavai.

Track listing
No.	Title	Lyrics	Singer(s)	Length
1.	"Yennoda Raasi"	Pa. Vijay	Venkat Prabhu	4:28
2.	"Saami Kittay"	Pa. Vijay	Hariharan, Shreya Ghoshal	4:47
3.	"Nee Enthan"	Yugabharathi	Karthik	4:55
4.	"Shaheeba Shaheeba"	Pa. Vijay	Hariharan, Sujatha Mohan	3:58
5.	"Vaa Vaa"	Pa. Vijay	Shankar Mahadevan, Mahalakshmi Iyer	5:22
6.	"Sakka Podu"	Viveka	K. K., Sadhana Sargam	4:21
Total length:				27:51

== Critical reception ==
Sify claimed that Ravi was a "hundred percent convincing as an action hero," further labelling his performance as "impressive." Lajjavathi of Kalki called it "one time watchable".
