= Pathaaka =

- VCD cover
- Directed by: K. Madhu
- Written by: Robin Thirumala
- Produced by: Mayoora Enterprise
- Starring: Suresh Gopi; Renuka Menon; Sai Kumar; Lalu Alex
- Cinematography: Uthpan V. Nair
- Edited by: P. C. Mohanan
- Music by: Tej Mervin
- Production company: Tharangini Films
- Release date: 4 August 2006
- Country: India
- Language: Malayalam

Pathaaka (transl. The Flag) is a 2006 Indian Malayalam-language action drama film directed by K. Madhu. The film stars Suresh Gopi, Renuka Menon, Sindhu Menon, Sai Kumar and Lalu Alex in lead roles. The film has musical score by Tej Mervin.

== Plot ==
George Thariyan, the industry minister, wants to develop the state economically. When he refuses to give a share of the business deals to the opposition party, he is charged with corruption.

== Cast ==
- Suresh Gopi as G.T/C.M George Thariyan
- Manoj K Jayan as City Police Commissioner Harinarayanan IPS
- Arun as Anwar Husaain
- Renuka Menon as Meera Menon
- Sindhu Menon as Namitha Choudari IPS
- Navya Nair as Ashitha Muhammed
- Sheela as Elizhabeth Mammen
- Sai Kumar as Minister Farookh Shah
- Lalu Alex as Chief Minister Nandakumar
- Subair as Rasheed
- Vijayakumar as Asharuff, GT's Gunman
- Janardhanan as Muhammed Mash
- Venu Nagavally as Shekharji/Shekaran
- Sreelatha Namboothiri as Kunjamma
- Devan as Rajan Nadar
- Kollam Thulasi as Joseph Xavier
- Mukundan as Gouthaman
- Shammi Thilakan as Monipalli Dineshan
- Madhupal as Pratheesh Nambiyar
- Manu Raj as Manikandan
- Krishnapriya as Reshmi
- Ravi Menon as Kellappan Nair
- Kunchan as Bapputty
- Bindu Panicker as Mollykutty
- Kochu Preman as Aravindan
- Biju Pappan as Circle Inspector Suresh
- Meghanathan as City Police Commissioner Yousuf Ali IPS
- Ajay Rathnam as Vincent Mozes
- Nishanth Sagar as Murugadas

== Soundtrack ==
Musical score by Tej.

- Kannin Isalukal Perum - M.G. Sreekumar and Jyotsna
