= Ennu Swantham Punyalan =

2025 Indian film

- Theatrical release poster
- Directed by: Mahesh Madhu
- Written by: Samji M. Antony
- Produced by: Ligo John
- Starring: Arjun Ashokan; Balu Varghese; Anaswara Rajan; Renji Panicker; Althaf Salim; Baiju Santhosh
- Cinematography: Renadive
- Edited by: Sobin K. Soman
- Music by: Sam C. S.
- Production company: Truth Seekers Movie Productions
- Distributed by: Magic Frames (India); Phars Film (overseas)
- Release date: 10 January 2025
- Running time: 129 minutes
- Country: India
- Language: Malayalam
- Budget: ₹8.70 crore

Ennu Swantham Punyalan (transl. Your own, Saint) is a 2025 Indian Malayalam-language fantasy comedy thriller film directed by Mahesh Madhu and written by Samji M. Antony. It stars Arjun Ashokan, Balu Varghese, Anaswara Rajan, Renji Panicker, Althaf Salim, and Baiju Santhosh.

The film was officially announced on 3 November 2023. Principal photography began on 24 June 2024, with filming locations including Thrissur, Ernakulam, and Kottayam. The songs and original score were composed by Sam C. S. The film was released on 10 January 2025.

== Plot ==
Reluctant priest Thomas' life is disrupted when a young woman and a thief unexpectedly arrive at his church mansion, leading to a series of chaotic encounters that uncover connections and revelations amidst misunderstandings and dilemmas.

== Cast ==
- Arjun Ashokan as Punyalan
- Balu Varghese as Fr. Thomas
  - Vishnu Purushan as younger Thomas
- Anaswara Rajan as Meera
- Renji Panicker as Fr.Nicholas
- Althaf Salim as Kapyar
- Baiju Santhosh
- Vineeth Viswam as Shanu
- Sinoj Varghese
- Meenaraj Palluruthy
- Surjith Gopinath
- Maya as servant
- Balu Sreedhar as Sub Inspector

== Production ==
=== Development ===
The film marks the directorial debut of Mahesh Madhu. On 16 January 2023, Mahesh Madhu announced the project, confirming Arjun Ashokan, Balu Varghese, and Anaswara Rajan as part of the cast. The story and screenplay was written by Samji M. Antony. The film is produced by Ligo John under the banner of The Truth Seekers.

The cinematography was handled by Renadive and the visuals and pacing supervised by editor Sobin K. Soman.

=== Casting ===
Arjun Ashokan signed on for Ennu Swantham Punyalan. The team announced that Balu Varghese, Anaswara Rajan, Renji Panicker, Althaf Salim, and Baiju Santhosh would play key roles, with Anaswara Rajan taking the female lead. The director also stated that the movie would introduce a number of new faces.

=== Filming ===
Principal photography of the film began on 3 November 2023, with a puja ceremony. The shoot lasted for 70 days, taking place across various locations, including Ezhupunna, Alappuzha, Aluva, Ernakulam, and Kuttikkanam in Idukki. The first schedule was held from 1 to 8 March 2023, in Ernakulam. The second schedule took place from 3 to 31 November 2023, in Ezhupunna and Kuttikkanam. The third and final schedule occurred from 2 to 10 December 2023, in Aluva, followed by the final leg of the shoot in Kuttikkanam from 11 December 2023, to 5 January 2024.

== Music ==
The songs and background score for the film were composed by Sam C. S. The music rights for the film were acquired by Magic Frames Music.

== Release ==
It released on 10 January 2025, as announced by actor Arjun Ashokan through his social media handles.

== Reception ==
=== Critical reception ===
Vignesh Madhu of The New Indian Express rated the film 1.5/5 stars and wrote, "With nothing much going its way, Ennu Swantham Punyalan ends up as a largely forgettable affair."

Anjana George of The Times of India called the film a "quirky concoction of chaos, comedy, and charm" and rated it 3/5 stars. She wrote, "Ennu Swantham Punyalan is a fantasy ride that keeps its feet firmly planted in human emotions, all while giving us a hilarious peek into the not-so-holy life of a priest with more on his plate than prayers. ... Not saintly enough to preach, but just naughty enough to entertain!"

Anandu Suresh of The Indian Express rated the film 2.5/5 stars and wrote, "If you're looking for a chance to switch the brain into hibernate mode and enjoy a light-hearted watch, this Anaswara Rajan and Arjun Ashokan-starrer could be the perfect pick for your weekend."

Divya P. of OTTPlay rated the film 3/5 stars and wrote, "Ennu Swantham Punyalan shines in moments when both its clever writing and actors join forces to pull it back from the path of predictability. If only the makers had incorporated more of this smart storytelling, we would have gotten a cracker of a film and not left with a film that comes alive in short bursts of energy. That said, those looking for a light-hearted and fun movie, Ennu Swantham Punyalan may not come across as a disappointment."

Asianet News wrote, "This is a thriller that can be enjoyed for two and a half hours, and it is a film that you can boldly buy tickets for as an interesting film that you can watch with your own pious family."

Swathi P. Ajith of Onmanorama wrote, "The narrative does leave a few loose ends, with some connections feeling underdeveloped, which might leave viewers wanting a bit more cohesion. That said, if you're in the mood for a lighthearted family entertainer, this movie is definitely worth a trip to the theatres.
