= Thappana =

2012 film by Johny Antony

- Theatrical release poster
- Directed by: Johny Antony
- Screenplay by: M. Sindhuraj
- Based on: Ashapoorna Devis work
- Produced by: Milan Jaleel
- Starring: Mammootty; Charmy Kaur; Murali Gopy; Vijayaraghavan; Kalabhavan Shajon
- Cinematography: Rajarathnam
- Edited by: Ranjan Abraham
- Music by: Vidyasagar
- Distributed by: Galaxy Films; PJ Entertainments
- Release date: 19 August 2012 (India)
- Running time: 150 minutes
- Country: India
- Language: Malayalam
- Budget: ₹1.5 crore
- Box office: ₹7.50 crore

Thappana is a 2012 Indian Malayalam-language action comedy film based on the work of Bengali novelist Ashapurna Debi and directed by Johny Antony produce by Milan Jaleel under his banner Galaxy Films.. The film stars Mammootty in lead role. The film was released on 19 August 2012.

It tells the story of two convicts, the petty thief Samson (Mammootty) and the young girl Mallika (Charmy Kaur), who are released from prison on the same day. Samson accompanies the depressed girl on her journey back home in Karippa and finds out the cause of the murder attempt on Mallika's husband.

== Synopsis ==
Samson and Mallika have just been released from prison. Samson is a small-time thief but a good and kind hearted man to whom prison is a "second home" while Mallika went to prison for murdering someone to save her husband from being killed. Samson falls in love with the girl at first sight. He decides to accompany her on the journey back home, but during the entire journey, Mallika is absolutely quiet and refuses to utter a word to him. She seems depressed and lonely. Shocking things await her when she reaches her home in Karippa to meet her husband Manikuttan/Kannukuttan. Kannukuttan was having an affair with their neighbour's wife Nirmala, and her husband Sudhakaran wanted to kill Kannukuttan. She trusts Kannukuttan and to save him, she killed Sudhakaran. When she finds out that Kannukuttan was cheating her and he was living happily with Nirmala and a child, she tries to kill him but fails. Mallika gives a contract to Samson for killing Kannukuttan and pre-climax is shown where Kannukuttan is seen with a woman and she is in her nudity state but her body is covered by a blanket and that affair happens when police led by John George come inside to catch him but he runs but Samson and his partner Kochappi stop him and John brings the woman out dressed properly,it is revealed that Kannukuttan was involved in human sexual activity and in which he was involved in immoral affairs therefore Kannukuttan is arrested but is released and Nirmala hates him after finding the truth, but he tries to take away only for Samson to intervene and fight him and his goons, but Samson overpowers him and tells the truth about Kannukuttan. The climax shows Mallika, Samson and Kochappi enjoying themselves staying in a truck going for a trip.

== Cast ==
- Mammootty as Samson aka Sam Achayan
- Charmy Kaur as Mallika, Manikuttan's wife
- Murali Gopy as Manikuttan/Kannukuttan
- Kalabhavan Shajohn as Kochappi
- Sadiq as Jacob, Mallika's relative
- Mala Aravindan as Kesavan, Mallika's uncle
- Sajitha Betti as Nirmala, Sudhakaran's ex-wife and Manikuttan's second wife
- Vijayaraghavan as CI John George, Station House Officer
- Lakshmi Priya as Sunanda (Malli's cousin and Kesavan's daughter)
- Suresh Krishna as Chettiyar Shivan, Manikuttan's henchman
- Anil Murali as Vijayan, Sudhakaran's elder brother
- Manikandan Pattambi as C. Pavithran/ C.P
- Kottayam Nazeer as Manikuttan's helper
- Irshad as Sudhakaran
- Jubil Rajan P. Dev as Joymon
- Vijeesh as Chedathi Sabu
- Ponnamma Babu as Annamma
- Namo Narayana as Scooty driver
- Abu Salim
- Geetha Vijayan as Sathi Kannukuttan's lover who is arrested with Kannukuttan

== Production ==
Thappana was launched on 5 March 2012. The movie started production in mid-April and was mostly filmed in Idukki. Filming was completed in 52 days, ahead of the schedules that was originally planned for 60 days.

== Critical reception ==
IndiaGlitz gave the movie 6.5/10, saying that Thaappana is not an [sic] unique work, but offers an ordinary watch that may please you for this festival season. If marketed well, Thappana may also end the recent flop show of the Superstar."

The Times of India gave the movie 3.5/5, stating that "Director Johny Antony does play to the multitude at times but his grip on the narrative never loosens and notches up a film that may not be remarkable but surely worth watching."

Metro Matinee gave the movie a verdict of "Watchable", saying that "Thappana is an extremely simple movie, with its raw humour and earthy wise cracks. Both the story and the humour could be easily related. There are no major shortcomings and the little ones could be ignored. An ordinary story has been made endearing through some good script writing, spectacular photography, sensible acting and direction. The humour might annoy the prude but provides continuous enjoyment to the rest. A perfect prescription for family audiences. In short, a fairly nice option, if you don't think too much!"

Paresh C. Palicha of Rediff.com gave the movie 2.5/5, concluding that "Thappana has the flavour of a typical star film like Rajamanikyam or Mayavi, but it does not go overboard nor is it overly dependent on the star."

== Box office ==
The film was released in approximately 80 theatres. The film ran for 50 days and completed around 6500 shows in theatres. The film received mixed critical response. The film was commercial success.

== Soundtrack ==
The film's soundtrack was composed by Vidyasagar.
