= News (film) =

- VCD cover
- Directed by: M. K. Maheshwar
- Written by: M. K. Maheshwar
- Produced by: M T Sriram; C Gopi; M Kumar
- Starring: Upendra; Reema Sen; Renuka Menon
- Cinematography: Sendhil Kumar
- Edited by: Jo Ni Harsha
- Music by: Gurukiran
- Production company: Sri Vidya Pictures
- Release date: 4 August 2005
- Running time: 129 minutes
- Country: India
- Language: Kannada

News is a 2005 Indian Kannada-language drama film directed and written by M. K. Maheshwar. The film stars Upendra along with Reema Sen and Renuka Menon in the lead roles. The film was produced by Sri Vidya Pictures.

The film was released on 4 August 2005 to generally positive reviews from critics. However, the film failed commercially at the box-office. The critics commented that the plot elements of the movie had loose similarities with Malayalam movies like Iyer the Great and New Delhi.

== Cast ==
- Upendra as Guru
- Reema Sen as Pooja
- Renuka Menon as Divya
- Nassar as Devaraj, editor of Number 1 newspaper
- Tennis Krishna as Gopala, film director
- Ashok as editor of Super News newspaper
- Avinash as Umesh
- Bank Janardhan as Gopala's father
- Anantha Velu as J. J. Patil
- Mandeep Roy as a doctor
- Bhagya Shree
- K. V. Manjaiah

== Production ==
The song "Good Morning" was shot in Bangkok.

== Soundtrack ==
The music of the film was composed by Gurukiran.

News

Soundtrack album by Gurukiran
- Released: 21 July 2005
- Genre: Feature film soundtrack
- Label: Ashwini Audio

No.	Title	Lyrics	Singer(s)	Length
1.	"Naanu Jeetendra"	V. Manohar	Gurukiran, Sadhana Sargam
2.	"Good Morning"	Kaviraj	Udit Narayan, Chitra Sivaraman
3.	"Gira Gira"	Kaviraj	KK, Priyadarshini
4.	"Munjaneya"	Kaviraj	Udit Narayan, Shreya Ghoshal
5.	"Munjaneya-2"	Kaviraj	Shael Oswal, Shreya Ghoshal
6.	"Bombayee"	Gurukiran	Chaitra H. G.

== Reception ==
A critic from The Hindu wrote that "Vidya Pictures' maiden venture News is a welcome departure from the regular Kannada film narratives both in content and narrative mode". A critic from Rediff.com wrote that "Directed by story writer-turned-director Maheshwar, News has an interesting plot. The film's narration in the opening sequences is tight and helps build curiosity. Somewhere down the line, however, the director loses track". A critic from Indiaglitz wrote that "You will enjoy "News very much if you are a die hard Upendra fan. But if you look at the film objectively, it is a film with both positive and negative points and may be okay for one time viewing". S. N. Deepak of Deccan Herald wrote "The film's story is interesting and is different from most of today's movies. The naration is also interesting but the end is ordinary and the secret of Divya's dreams goes unexplained".

== External source ==
- Year 2005 roundup
