= Neelakasham Pachakadal Chuvanna Bhoomi =

- Official poster
- Directed by: Sameer Thahir
- Written by: Hashir Mohamed
- Produced by: Sameer Thahir
- Starring: Dulquer Salmaan; Sunny Wayne
- Cinematography: Gireesh Gangadharan
- Edited by: A. Sreekar Prasad
- Music by: Rex Vijayan
- Production companies: Happyhours Entertainment; E4 Entertainment
- Distributed by: E4 Entertainment & PJ Entertainments Europe
- Release date: 9 August 2013
- Country: India
- Language: Malayalam

Neelakasham Pachakadal Chuvanna Bhoomi (transl. Blue Sky, Green Sea, Red Earth) is a 2013 Indian Malayalam-language road adventure film directed and co-produced by Sameer Thahir and written by Hashir Mohamed. The film stars Dulquer Salmaan and Sunny Wayne with Dhritiman Chatterjee, Surja Bala Hijam in supporting roles. The movie was a hit at the Kerala box office and has since developed a cult following among the youth of Kerala. The film began shooting in the north-eastern state of Nagaland in February 2013 and completed its shoot in June 2013. The film was shot at real locations in eight Indian states, Kerala, Karnataka, Andhra Pradesh, Tamil Nadu, Odisha, West Bengal, Nagaland and Sikkim.

The film revolves around Kasi (Dulquer Salmaan) and Suni (Sunny Wayne) who go on a road trip from Kerala to Nagaland. Later, it was dubbed into Hindi as Pyaar Ka Toofan (transl. Love Storm) in 2021. Over the years, the film has accumulated a cult following and huge fan base.

== Plot ==
In Kerala, Kasi embarks upon a road trip. His best friend, Suni, joins him and refuses to return even though Kasi informs him that he himself is not sure of the destination. They travel to Odisha via Bangalore and Vizag where they are attacked by bandits. However, a group of riders rescue them and Kasi and Suni join them on their journey to Puri to attend a surfing festival.

While in Puri, Kasi meets Ishita, a surfer. She develops an attraction towards Kasi and shares her feelings. Kasi tells her that he was in love with Assi, a girl from Nagaland. Nagaland is a place of political unrest and her parents were killed during the fights. Kasi takes her home to get his parents' approval to get married. However, his mom tells him of her displeasure as she does not share their culture or religion. Though his father was more supportive, he too disapproves their relationship fearing the family's social status. It is revealed that Kasi is on his way to Nagaland to win her back.

From Puri, they head to Kolkata. However, on the way, they are mistaken for bandits in a village. When they inform him that they are from Kerala, the village chief reminisces about his life as a Communist and welcomes them to stay. In the village, they help to build a machine that grinds wheat. Suni falls in love with the chief's daughter, Gouri.

Beyond Kolkata, they ride further east when an unidentified truck tries to injure Suni. When their bikes get punctured, they take it to a shop which happened to be owned by a Malayalee. He reveals that he had run away from the state years ago for committing a political murder. He informs that years later he has forgotten the ideals of the party and that he yearns to go back. Kasi remembers the time in college when one of his friends was murdered by some goons due to some scuffle.

When they reach Assam, they end up in the middle of a communal riot where they rescue a little girl. Kasi begins to regret the road trip and calls his parents to inform them that he is coming back. With a new outlook on life after meeting different people and visiting different places, he decides against going back and continues the journey. As they near their destination, Suni turns back to go to Gouri and the two friends separate.

Kasi reaches Nagaland and searches for Assi. The presence of a stranger attracts the attention of local militants and they plan to attack Assi that night. Kasi meets Assi and they get back together. At night when the militants arrive at Assi's house, they find the two missing. The film ends with Kasi and Assi riding away at dawn to Tawang.

== Cast ==
- Dulquer Salmaan as Kasim aka Kasi
- Sunny Wayne as Sunil Lekshmi aka Suni
- Surja Bala Hijam as Assi
- Shaun Romy as Assi's friend
- Ena Saha as Gouri
- Abhija Sivakala as Paru
- Shane Nigam as Shyam
- Joy Mathew as Abdul Haji
- Dhritiman Chatterjee as Bimalda
- Vanitha Krishnachandran as Azma
- Paloma Monappa as Ishita
- Avantika Mohan as Fatima
- Anikha Surendran as WafaMol
- Ajay Nataraj
- Master Reinhard Abernathy as Balu
- Surjith Gopinath as Raghavan
- K. T. C. Abdullah
- Modhubala Devi as Grandma
- Bobby Zachariah Abraham
- Pearle Maaney
- Avinash Sivadas Vettiyattil

== Production ==
Manipuri actress Surja Bala Hijam was signed to play Assi, a student who comes to Kerala to study engineering. The film is Bala's Malayalam debut. 18-year-old Bengali actress Ena Saha played Sunny Wayne's love interest, Gauri. Joy Mathew was cast to play Dulquer Salmaan's father. Paloma Monappa played a surfer, also making her Malayalam debut. A Kochi-based adventurer, Bobby Zachariah, Abraham played a biker.

The film was shot in Nagaland in the north-eastern part of India, at Government Engineering College, Thrissur, and in Ayyanthole. The costumes were designed by Mashar Hamsa. Stills by Vishnu Thandassery. This film's first official teaser released on 22 June in YouTube and got largely positive reviews from the viewers. The movie was released all over Kerala on 9 August 2013.

== Soundtrack ==
Neelakasham Pachakkadal Chuvanna Bhoomi

Soundtrack album by Rex Vijayan
- Released: 24 July 2013
- Genre: Feature film soundtrack
- Length: 20:14
- Label: Happy Hours Entertainments
- Producer: Rex Vijayan

Rex Vijayan chronology
English: An Autumn in London (2013)	Neelakasham Pachakkadal Chuvanna Bhoomi (2013)	North 24 Kaatham (2013)

The music of the film was composed by Rex Vijayan and the lyrics were written by Vinayak Sasikumar.

No.	Title	Artist(s)	Length
1.	"Doore Doore"	Suchith Suresan	4:17
2.	"Neelakasham"	Rex Vijayan	3:40
3.	"Thazhvaram"	Sushin Shyam	4:07
4.	"Neerppalunkukal"	Saju Sreenivas	3:30
5.	"Ami Hitmajhare"	Traditional Bengali Baul Song	4:40

== Critical reception ==
IndiaGlitz gave a rating of 7.5/10, stating that "is a movie that must be watched for its solid, though diluted content." But the first slides very well when the second half is dilute as the normal film which don't depend it. In which the cinematography, music, and art direction, are perfectly done which it has bright freshness to all. The Times of India rated the film as a 3.5/5, praising some of the voice acting, but questioning the relevance of some of the character's political stances. The Hindu praised the entertaining nature of the film, the acting and the script, whilst criticizing the second half of the film and its climax.

=== Cult status ===
The movie post release emerged as one of the most influential movies among YA audience and was single-handedly responsible for the rise in travel/ride culture and sudden spurt in the number of Bullet users across Kerala.
