= 5 Sundarikal =

- Promotional poster
- Directed by: Shyju Khalid; Sameer Thahir; Aashiq Abu; Amal Neerad; Anwar Rasheed
- Screenplay by: Shyam Pushkaran; Muneer Ali; Siddharth Bharathan; Sijoy Varghese; Abhilash S. Kumar; Unni R. Hashir Mohamed
- Story by: M. Mukundan; Sijoy Varghese; Amal Neerad; Feng Jicai; Hashir Mohamed
- Produced by: Amal Neerad
- Starring: Anikha Surendran; Chethan Jayalal; Isha Sharvani; Kavya Madhavan; Reenu Mathews; Asmita Sood; Nivin Pauly; Biju Menon; Jayasurya; Jinu Ben; Dulquer Salmaan; Fahadh Faasil
- Cinematography: Alby; Shyju Khalid; Rajeev Ravi; Renadive; Amal Neerad
- Edited by: Vivek Harshan; Praveen Prabhakar
- Music by: Gopi Sundar; Bijibal; Prashant Pillai; Yakzan-Neha
- Production company: Amal Neerad Productions
- Distributed by: August Cinema
- Release date: 21 June 2013
- Country: India
- Language: Malayalam

5 Sundarikal (English: 5 Beautiful Women) is a 2013 Indian Malayalam-language romantic anthology film. It contains five short stories on love about five types of women. The stories are directed by Shyju Khalid, Sameer Thahir, Aashiq Abu, Amal Neerad, and Anwar Rasheed, and feature an ensemble cast. The film was produced by Amal Neerad Productions. The music directors were Gopi Sundar, Bijibal, Prashant Pillai and Yakzan Gary Pereira. The film was released in theatres on 21 June. A promo song by popular Kochi-based rock band Black Letters was also released.

The featurette Sethulakshmi is an adaptation of M. Mukundan's short story "Photo" while Kullande Bharya is based on a Chinese story, "The Tall Woman and Her Short Husband", by Feng Jicai. It is narrated by Dulquer Salmaan.

== List of short films ==
Title	Director	Story	Screenplay	Cinematographer	Music
Sethulakshmi	Shyju Khalid	M. Mukundan	Shyam Pushkaran; Muneer Ali	Alby	Yakzan Gary Pereira
Isha	Sameer Thahir	Sijoy Varghese	Siddharth Bharathan; Sijoy Varghese	Shyju Khalid	Prashant Pillai
Gauri	Aashiq Abu	Amal Neerad (story idea)	Abhilash Kumar	Rajeev Ravi	Bijibal
Kullante Bharya	Amal Neerad	Feng Jicai	Unni R.	Renu (renadive)	Gopi Sundar
Aami	Anwar Rasheed	Hashir Mohamed	Hashir Mohamed	Amal Neerad	Yakzan Gary pereira

== Plots ==
=== Sethulakshmi ===
Sethulakshmi (Baby Anikha), a schoolgirl, collects photos of newly married couples from newspapers and pastes them in a notebook. Her close friend Abhilash (Chethan Jayalal) learns about her interest in photography. They decide to go to a nearby studio to take their photos. This decision changes their destiny. They go to the photo studio and have their picture taken. They learn that they have to pay the studio Rs. 25. They are asked to bring the money in two days. They can only manage Rs. 6.50 and two eggs (brought by Abhilash). The studio owner tells them he will go to their school and get the balance from their teacher. Both children state that it is a bad idea. This sends the studio owner into a rage, prompting him to demand his money. After a moment, he calms down and asks Sethulakshmi to come into the film room to take a picture. While there, he asks her to strip; she cries, wanting to go home. Sethulakshmi has nightmares of that incident that night, but does not disclose anything to her parents. Her father takes her to school the next day, while she is feverish. After school, as Sethulakshmi and Abhilash walk home, they see the studio owner's scooter. He hands the picture to Abhilash but pulls Sethulakshmi aside and threatens her to put her picture on the school wall if she does not immediately accompany him. Abhilash demands to know where the studio owner is taking her, but the owner tells him to go home. Sethulaskhmi's friend is left alone as he watches the studio owner and Sethulaskhmi leave on his scooter.

=== Isha ===
This episode of love opens with a husband and wife preparing to leave for a New Year's Eve party. While the husband is nonchalant about it, the wife is concerned about leaving their daughter Theresa (Isha Sharvani) at home. She is concerned about her safety and her shenanigans. After the couple leaves, the daughter becomes aware of someone inside the house. By then, it is too late as she wakes up tied to a chair in her house. She notices the thief is wearing a mask, and after a few attempts at freeing herself, the thief asks her to calm down. After Theresa continues to struggle, it is revealed that she has asthma and asks the thief to get her the inhaler, which is in her bag. While getting the inhaler, the thief (Nivin Pauly) inadvertently removes his mask. He threatens her to be quiet after she asks to be untied. As the thief begins searches the drawers, Isha lets him know in which drawer the house valuables are. After taking all the jewels in the house, the thief is set to leave, when Theresa proposes an idea. She tells the thief that if he were to spend New Year's Eve with her at home, she would show him more of the expensive things in the house. It is revealed that Theresa's mother is really her stepmother, and she harbours resentment against her. The thief releases Theresa. While she is excited about this stealing adventure, the thief is only interested in the valuables. As the night moves on, Theresa gets very comfortable with the thief, even seducing him. They celebrate New Year's Day on the terrace with some intimate moments. At this point, it is obvious that the thief is drunk from the wine that belonged to Theresa's father. Theresa uses this to her advantage and ties the thief to the very chair she was confined to. The true suspense is revealed to the audience after this, as she is not the actual daughter. She is Isha, another thief who came before the male thief and tied up the actual daughter.

=== Gowri ===
The short film tells the love story of a married couple living in a hill station. After legalising their love affair through a registered marriage, Gauri (Kavya Madhavan) and Jonathan Antony (Biju Menon) choose the place to begin their married life. Jo is crazy about trekking, while Gauri is a dancer and teaches art to her students. On their anniversary, Jo leaves home before sunrise and goes trekking. Gauri wakes up hours later to find a note on their bedside table, which seems to be a fun scavenger hunt set up by Jo to get rid of her boredom. She sets out to find the clues while doing her daily routine. As soon as she finds the third note, Jo's guide knocks on the door and tells her that Jo has fallen from a cliff. Gauri is devastated and is in denial of Jo's death. Years later, a man comes to look at the same property and learns that Gauri had killed herself that night and the bungalow has been empty ever since.

=== Kullante Bharya ===
A newlywed couple comes to stay in an apartment. The husband (Jinu Ben) is 5'1", while his wife (Reenu Mathews) is 6 feet. Their neighbours begin to gossip about them. As the couple lives happily, they expect their baby to add to the joy, but destiny has something else in store for them. The whole film is pictured from the point of view of a person who is bedridden after an accident (played by Dulquer Salmaan). It is reminiscent of the photographer in a wheelchair observing his neighbours in Alfred Hitchcock's Rear Window.

=== Aami ===
A businessman, Ajmal (Fahadh Faasil), faces a row of events during his journey from Malappuram to Kochi. His affectionate wife (Asmita Sood) tries to keep him awake during the drive by asking a few tricky questions. The nocturnal journey becomes eventful, changing the course of his life.

== Cast ==
=== Sethulakshmi ===
- Anikha Surendran as Sethulakshmi
- Chethan Jayalal as Abhilash
- Guru Somasundaram as Photographer
- Gopalakrishnan as Achan
- Anjali Nair as Amma
- Unnimaya Prasad as Teacher
- Dileesh Pothen as Abhilash's father
- Baby Aavani as sister

=== Isha ===
- Isha Sharvani as Theresa
- Nivin Pauly as Jinu/Santa
- Deepak Sharaf as Teresa's father
- Sujatha as Teresa's mother
- Pradeep Kottayam as Police Constable

=== Gauri ===
- Kavya Madhavan as Gauri
- Biju Menon as Jonathan Antony
- Shine Tom Chacko as Servant
- Tini Tom
- Rimi Tomy
- Jayasurya as buyer

=== Kullante Bharya ===
- Reenu Mathews as Kullante Bharya
- Jinu Ben as Kullan
- Dulquer Salman as Injured stuntman
- Dileesh Pothen as Security
- Soubin Shahir
- Muthumani as Sicily
- Pauly Valsan as Molly Chechi
- Mano Jose as Sugunan
- Shirly Somasundaran as Annamma Chacko
- Jayaraj as Chacko Mash
- Sankar T. K. as Sicily's husband
- Ajith Vijayan as Ambiswamy
- Shanthi Sunil as Ambiswamy's wife
- Karan Rahul as Schoolboy

=== Aami ===
- Asmita Sood as Aami
- Fahadh Faasil as Ajmal
- Honey Rose as Nancy
- Chemban Vinod Jose as Joshy
- Vinayakan as Chandran

== Production ==
The first film Sethulakshmi was by cinematographer Shyju, debuting as a director. The film was an adaptation of the story "Photo" by M. Mukundan. Two child artists, Baby Anikha and Chethan, played the lead in his segment. Tamil theatre actor Somasundaram, who acted in Aaranya Kaandam, was signed to play a photographer in the film, setting foot into Malayalam films.

Sameer Thahir cast Isha Sharvani opposite Nivin Pauly in his segment. Isha, who made her Malayalam debut with this film, said that Sameer's story - written by Sijoy Varghese - explores the love between two strangers. This segment was completed in January 2013.

Aashiq Abu's featurette Gauri (earlier titled Naayika) is a period film about a group of people going in search of a promised land. Biju Menon and Kavya Madhavan were signed to play the lead. Singer Rimi Tomy stated that she would be acting opposite Tini Tom, making her acting debut. In March 2013, Jayasurya was also signed up for a role. The shoot of the portion was held in Munnar and other locales.

Amal Neerad cast Dulquer Salmaan and Reenu Mathews, who acted in Lal Jose's Immanuel, as the lead pair for his portion. Debutante Jinu Ben was given a prominent role. Neerad said that the story was loosely based on an ancient Chinese short story, "The Tall Woman and Her Short Husband".

Fahadh Faasil stated that he and Rima Kallingal would pair up in Anwar Rasheed's segment of the anthology. Rima Kallingal was replaced, and Honey Rose and Asmita Sood played the lead female roles in this film. Anwar said that the story unfolds on an eventful night and can be called a road movie.

The directors pitched in for each other as well. Anwar Rasheed's portion was filmed by Amal Neerad; Shyju Kahlid handled the camera for Sameer Thahir's film; Aashiq Abu's film was shot by Rajeev Ravi; Amal Neerad chose his assistant, Ranadive, to operate the camera.

== Soundtrack ==
5 Sundarikal

Soundtrack album by Gopi Sundar, Yakzan Gary Pereira, Bijibal, Prashant Pillai
- Released: 21 June 2013
- Genre: Feature film soundtrack
- Length: 26:22
- Label: Mathrubhumi Music

5 Sundarikal
No.	Title	Lyrics	Music	Singer(s)	Length
1.	"Ekantham" (Title Song)	Rafeeq Ahammed	Gopi Sunder	Kunal Ganjawala, Sreya Raghav	5:29
2.	"Manthara Kaatte" (Segment:Sethulakshmi)	Rafeeq Ahammed	Yakzan Gary Pereira	Neha Nair	2:30
3.	"Mazhaneer" (Segment: Gauri)	Sunil Raj Sathya	Bijibal	Gayatri Asokan	3:16
4.	"Theera Lahari" (Segment: Isha)	Kavalam Narayana Panikkar	Prashant Pillai	Preeti Pillai	2:21
5.	"Amor Amor" (Segment: Kullante Bharya)		Gopi Sunder	Anna Katharina Valayil	2:33
6.	"Thammil Thammil" (Segment: Isha)	Kavalam Narayana Panikkar	Prashant Pillai	Preeti Pillai	2:21
7.	"Kaanadooram" (Segment: Aami)	Neha Nair	Yakzan Gary Pereira	Neha Nair	4:31
8.	"You Say" (Promo Song)	Black Letters	Black Letters	Sharath Iyer	3:20
Total length:					26:22

== Awards ==
- Kerala State Film Award for Best Child Artist - Anikha Surendran
