= Vargam =

2006 Indian film

- Directed by: M. Padmakumar
- Written by: M. Padmakumar
- Produced by: Haseeb; Dhalik; Noushad
- Starring: Prithviraj Sukumaran; Renuka Menon
- Cinematography: Shamdat Sainudeen
- Edited by: Ranjan Abraham
- Music by: Thottappally Subhash; Thej
- Production company: Malayalam Movie Makers
- Distributed by: Sargachitra
- Release date: 10 February 2006
- Country: India
- Language: Malayalam

Vargam (transl. Tribe) is a 2006 Indian Malayalam-language action thriller film written and directed by M. Padmakumar. The film stars Prithviraj Sukumaran, Renuka Menon, Vijayaraghavan, Devan and Captain Raju. The plot follows Solomon Joseph, a corrupt police officer.

== Plot ==
Solomon Joseph a corrupt police officer who is the sub inspector of Police in charge of Rajakkadu station in Idukki. He has learnt the importance of money and power, and using it, he earns wads of money. He spends the money on booze and women. He is completely estranged with his father and step family and lives his life on his own terms. He is close to a catholic priest who is a fatherly figure to him.

Two influential businessmen, Ummachan and Vavachan, clashes frequently in Rajakkadu. Solomon is friendly with Vavachan and even assists him in smuggling through his area of control. Through a series of events, Solomon locks horn with Ummachan's younger brother Dennis. Dennis, along with 4 friends, are visiting from Bangalore. Eventually, Solomon takes Dennis and his friends in custody after a violent clash in the town club. Ummachan manages to arrange bail for his brother and friends, but during the process, he threatens Solomon. The next day, when Solomon gets information that Dennis and friends have hired a local prostitute, he catches them in the act, with the intention of humiliating Ummachan along with getting as much bribe as possible for himself.

Ummachan is aiming to be the next candidate for the Legislative Assembly, and he fears that such an incident would impact his political future. He pleads with Solomon to let his brother go. But Solomon would not budge unless he is bribed 'properly'. They agree on a bribe of 3 lakhs to be delivered personally to Solomon. Ummachan tries to implicate Solomon in bribery charges. Solomon sniffs out the plan from Ummachan's nervous behavior and arrests Ummachan on charges for trying to bribe a public official. The brothers are soon released on bail.

Dennis attacks Solomon that night, assisted by his friends. Solomon beats up the entire gang single-handedly and takes Dennis to the police station. The beating continues, and hours of beating takes it toll and Dennis dies. Solomon, with the help of the constable Chandikkunju, dispose of the body. He appears to get away with murder when he just gets a punishment transfer to the northern corner of Kerala. Ummachan threatens to leave Solomon.

He takes charge of Badiyadka police station. The area is defacto ruled by Abubaker Haji, a wealthy smuggler and son Shereef. Haji made all his fortune by cheating his wealthy mentor Valiyaveetil Baputi. Baputi's wife and his daughter Nadia are facing eviction from their home because of Baputi's debts of 12 lakhs. Haji refuses to help them. Shereef tries to molest Nadia, and she files a complaint to the new Sub Inspector. Solomon befriends Abubaker Haji and takes his side in exchange for a bribe. This leads to a public clash between Solomon and Nadia. Solomon plots with Shereef's henchman Syed to publicly humiliate Nadia by arresting her in charge of prostitution. This leads to the death of a heart broken Nadia's mother. This was unexpected, and for the first time in his life, Solomon's conscience is dented. On the night of the funeral, Shareef tries to rape Nadia and Solomon saves her.

Chandikkunju turns up at Bathiyadukka and begs Solomon to give him 5 lakhs rupees for his daughter's marriage as Ummachan has created financial difficulties for him. Ummachan is chasing Chandikkunju for information on Dennis's remains. Solomon visits Haji's office for financial assistance but received by Shereef, who refuses to pay Solomon anything because of the grudge he keeps. In return, Solomon hijacks Haji's bootlegging truck with cargo estimated to be of 15 million rupees and takes 2.5 million rupees instead of the half million he asked earlier. Haji though appears to be amicable while giving the bribe, arranges Shereef and gang to attack Solomon. He gets near fatal injuries, but survives in hospital. Ummachan visits Solomon in the hospital, threatening to settle the scores once he fully recovers. Ummachan also hints that he has killed Chandikkunju who refused to disclose information on Dennis's remains.

When Solomon gets discharged, he is repentant of his corrupt life. He falls in love with Nadia and wants to marry her. He reconciles with his family, but it's too late for his father as he passes away before Solomon arrives. The day previous to their marriage, Ummachan, with the help of Haji and Shareef, kidnaps Nadia and uses her as a bait to Solomon to take his revenge on Dennis's life. Ummachan and his men trashes Solomon very badly but he is unable to fight back as Nadia is held captive. Vavachan arrives to help Solomon and save Nadia. An explosion sound is heard where Solomon thinks that Nadia is killed by Ummachan's men. In revenge, he fights and overpowers back Ummachan and his men and kills Ummachan. Later, Solomon realises that Nadia is not dead and is saved by Vavachan and reunites with her.

== Cast ==
- Prithviraj Sukumaran as SI Soloman Joseph
- Renuka Menon as Nadiya
- Vijayaraghavan as Vavachan
- Devan as Ummen Chacko (Ummachan) (voiceover by Jis Joy)
- Captain Raju as Arakkal Aboobakkar Haaji
- Ranjith Velayudhan as Dennis Chacko, Ummachan's brother (voiceover by Jis Joy)
- Augustine as Constable Chandi Kunju
- Anil Murali as Saidh
- Shaju as Kuriyachen
- Koottickal Jayachandran as Constable Paulose
- Priyanka as Mariyamma
- Rajan P Dev as Priest
- Cochin Haneefa as ASI Gopala Krishna Pillai
- Shobha Mohan as Naadiya's mother
- Ambika Mohan as Rahel, Solomon's mother
- T.S. Raju as Joseph Kalarimuttam, Solomon's father
- Anand as Arakkal Shereef

== Production ==
The film was shot in Thodupuzha and Ambalamugal in Kerala.

== Soundtrack ==
The film features music by

1. Kaavalay - Vidhu Prathap
2. Paalazhithumbi - Madhu Balakrishnan

== Reception ==
The film received critical acclaim. Paresh C. Palicha of Rediff.com stated that the film is "worth the money you spend on a ticket, and worth watching once on the big screen". Sreedhar Pillai of The Hindu called it a "a racy entertainer". However, the film did not recover its cost at the box office.
