= Sameer Thahir =

Indian cinematographer, screenwriter, and film director

- Born: Sameer C. Thahir; 7 November 1976 (age 49); Kochi, Kerala, India
- Education: Maharaja's College, Ernakulam
- Occupations: Cinematographer; director; screenwriter; producer
- Years active: 2007–present
- Organisation: Happy Hours Entertainments
- Spouse: Neethu (m. 2013)
- Father: Tahir Mattanchery
- Relatives: Sanu Thahir (brother)

Sameer C. Thahir ISC (born 7 November 1976) is an Indian cinematographer, screenwriter, producer and film director, who works primarily in Malayalam cinema.

He is a graduate of Maharajas College, Ernakulam. Sameer began his career assisting his mentors, fellow Indian Society of Cinematographers members Amal Neerad and Rajeev Ravi.

In 2007, he shot his first feature as an independent cinematographer when Amal Neerad turned to direct his debut film Big B.

Sameer's other credits include Aashiq Abu's film Daddy Cool (2009), Nidra (2012), Diamond Necklace (2012), Bangalore Days (2014), Thamaasha (2019) and Minnal Murali (2021). In 2017, Sameer received his first credit in Tamil Cinema with Soundarya Rajnikanth's comedy Velaiilla Pattadhari 2. In 2018, he was the cinematographer for Sometimes.

== Early life ==
Sameer Thahir is the son of Thahir Mattanchery, a production controller in Malayalam film industry. Sameer studied in Maharajas College Eranakulam. His mentors include Amal Neerad, Anwar Rasheed, and Rajeev Ravi.

== Career ==
In 2007, Sameer made his debut with Big B, the first film directed by cinematographer Amal Neerad. Later, he made his directorial and writing debut with Chaappa Kurishu (2011).

In 2012, he handled the cinematography for Siddharth Bharathan's Nidra and Lal Jose's Diamond Necklace. In 2013, Sameer directed a segment in the anthology film 5 Sundarikal. His second film as a director, Neelakasham Pachakadal Chuvanna Bhoomi, was released later that year.

Sameer handled the camera for the 2014 movie Bangalore Days, directed by Anjali Menon. In 2015, he produced the movie Chandrettan Evideya under his banner Happy Hours Entertainments. He produced and directed Kali, starring Dulquer Salmaan in 2016. Sameer was the cinematographer of the 2017 Tamil movie Velaiilla Pattadhari 2 and Priyadarshan's Sometimes (2018). He was the producer of Sudani from Nigeria (2018) and Thamaasha (2019), also handling the cinematography for the latter.

== Personal life ==
Sameer C. Thahir married Neethu on 12 November 2013. She is a professional social worker.

== Filmography ==
Year	Title	Language	Credits				Notes
Year	Title	Language	Director	Cinematographer	Producer	Writer	Notes
2007	Big B	Malayalam		Yes			Debut
2009	Daddy Cool	Malayalam		Yes			
2011	Chaappa Kurish	Malayalam	Yes			Yes	Co-written with Unni R.
2012	Nidra	Malayalam		Yes			
2012	Diamond Necklace	Malayalam		Yes			
2013	5 Sundarikal (Segment: "Isha")	Malayalam	Yes				Anthology Film
2013	Neelakasham Pachakadal Chuvanna Bhoomi	Malayalam	Yes		Yes		
2014	Bangalore Days	Malayalam		Yes			
2015	Chandrettan Evideya	Malayalam			Yes		Co-produced with Shyju Khalid and Ashiq Usman
2016	Kali	Malayalam	Yes		Yes		Co-produced with Shyju Khalid and Ashiq Usman
2017	Velaiilla Pattadhari 2	Tamil		Yes			Debut in Tamil cinema
2018	Sudani From Nigeria	Malayalam			Yes		Co-produced with Shyju Khalid
2018	Sometimes	Tamil		Yes			
2019	Thamaasha	Malayalam		Yes	Yes		Co-produced with Shyju Khalid, Chemban Vinod Jose and Lijo Jose Pellissery
2021	Minnal Murali	Malayalam		Yes			
2022	Pada	Malayalam		Yes			
2022	Dear Friend	Malayalam			Yes		Co-produced with Shyju Khalid and Ashiq Usman
2024	Aavesham	Malayalam		Yes			
2024	Sookshmadarshini	Malayalam			Yes		Co-produced with Shyju Khalid and A. V. Anoop
2026	Athiradi	Malayalam			Yes		Co-produced with Basil Joseph, Dr. Ananthu and Tovino Thomas
2026	Dhoomakethu	Malayalam			Yes		Co-produced with Shyju Khalid, Sajin Ali and Abbas Thirunavaya
TBA	Gracias El Classico	Malayalam			Yes		Co-produced with Shyju Khalid, Sajin Ali and Abbas Thirunavaya
