= Ajmal =

Ajmal (أجمل ) is both a given name and a surname of Arabic origin . It means “most beautiful” or “more handsome.” Notable people with the name include:

== Given name ==
- Ajmal Ameer, Indian actor in Tamil and Malayalam film Industries
- Ajmal Kasab (1987–2012), Pakistani terrorist
- Ajmal Khattak (1925–2010), Pakistani politician
- Ajmal Masroor (born 1971), British imam, broadcaster and politician
- Ajmal Naqshbandi, journalist's interpreter executed by the Taliban
- Ajmal Mian (1934–2017), Pakistani judge
- Ajmal Shahzad (born 1985), English cricketer
- Ajmal Shams (born 1972), Afghan politician

== Surname ==
- Badruddin Ajmal (born 1950), Indian politician
- M. Ajmal (1910–1988), Pakistani film old best actor
