= Nidra (2012 film) =

- Theatrical Film poster
- Directed by: Sidharth Bharathan
- Screenplay by: Santhosh Echikkanam; Sidharth Bharathan
- Story by: Ananthu
- Produced by: Sadanandan Rangorath; Debobrath Mondal
- Starring: Sidharth Bharathan; Jishnu Raghavan; Rima Kallingal; K. P. A. C. Lalitha; Vijay Menon
- Cinematography: Sameer Thahir
- Edited by: Bavan Sreekumar
- Music by: Songs: Jassie Gift; Background score: Prashant Pillai
- Production company: Lucsam Creations
- Distributed by: Remya Movies
- Release date: 24 February 2012 (Kerala)
- Running time: 104 minutes
- Country: India
- Language: Malayalam

Nidra is a 2012 Indian Malayalam-language romantic thriller film directed by Sidharth Bharathan in his directorial debut. A remake of the 1981 film of the same name directed by Sidharth's father Bharathan, it stars Sidharth Bharathan alongside Rima Kallingal and Jishnu Raghavan in the main roles. It marks the second collaboration of Jishnu and Sidharth after Nammal (2002) and comeback of Jishnu. Sidharth co-wrote the adapted screenplay with Santhosh Echikkanam. The songs were composed by Jassie Gift and the background score by Prashant Pillai. The cinematography was handled by Sameer Thahir.

Considered to be a part of the new-wave in Malayalam cinema, Nidra narrates the sensuous love story of Raju (Sidharth) and Ashwathy (Rima Kallingal). Raju is driven to the brink by circumstances and expectations of a materialistic world. The only person who keeps him grounded is his wife, Ashwathy. The film was well received by critics but did not fare well at the box office, mainly due to lack of promotion.

== Plot ==
Raju is the younger son from a wealthy family. Raju, who was in Germany to do space research, was not informed of his mother's demise and has a nervous breakdown when he gets the news. He takes a couple of years to recover. After that he marries his childhood sweetheart Ashwathy. She is the daughter of their former family chauffeur and the marriage took place much against her mother's wishes. Ashwathy barely has an idea as to what lies in store as Raju has had a history of mental unsteadiness. She has heard about his illness, that he has been mentally disturbed after his mother's death but now, she has to face the situation with virtually no support.

Raju lives in a world of his own, away from all the business deals and money, unlike his elder brother Vishwan. But his near and dear ones look at every action of his through the prism of his past illness, which frustrates him. It does not help that he has a rather short temper. To add to the oddities, he has converted his bedroom into a space research lab and dreams of building an organically self-sustainable world for himself and his wife in the middle of the family's rubber estate. Vishwan has plans to build a resort catering to foreign clients. All this makes Raju very angry and violent, and people begin to think that his illness has resurfaced. Ashwathy is determined to get him back to life with her love. She almost succeeds, but the people around them were not so bothered about compassion, tender human emotions and selfless love.

== Cast ==
- Sidharth Bharathan as Raju: Ashwathy's husband; Vishwan's younger brother
- Rima Kallingal as Ashwathy: Raju's wife
- Jishnu Raghavan as Vishwan: Raju's elder brother; Priya's husband
- Sarayu as Priya: Vishwan's wife
- Thalaivasal Vijay as Madhava Menon: Raju and Vishwan's father
- K. P. A. C. Lalitha as Bhargavi Amma: Ashwathy's mother
- Vijay Menon as Dr. Roy Peter
- Shivaji Guruvayoor as Chandran Menon: Rajeev's father
- Rajeev Parameshwar as Rajeev: Vishwan's friend
- Raashik Ajmal as Gopu: Vishwan's friend
- Malavika Menon as Revathi: Priya's sister
- Ambika Mohan as Priya's mother
- Baby Maria Biju as Ammu: Vishwan and Priya's daughter
- Manikandan Pattambi as Sabu: Raju's house-servant
- Kavitha as Maya
- Preethi as Nirmala

== Soundtrack ==
No.	Title	Artist(s)	Length
1.	"En Uyirile"
2.	"Koodu Maarippovum"
3.	"Oru Pakalaay Nee"
4.	"Shalabhamazha"	Shreya Ghoshal
5.	"When You Are A Stranger"	Antony Isaac

== Production ==
=== Pre-production ===
Nidra was announced in December 2010 and was originally titled Suhruthu. Kuttamath Films, a newly launched production house, was the producer. The production was to begin on 5 January 2011 and the film was slated to release coinciding with the festival of Vishu in April 2011. However, the project was long delayed due to technical reasons. Later the crew decided to retain the original title and the film, with the new title, was officially launched in November 2011 with production set to begin in December.

When the film was announced in 2010, Manu and Rima Kallingal were cast to play the lead roles, with the former making his film debut. Rima Kallingal, who had been the busiest actress of the year, was chosen as the female lead much earlier. When Manu opted out citing personal reasons (he made his debut later in 2011 through Tournament), the role eventually went to Siddharth who had proven his charisma as an actor in his debut film Nammal. Siddharth says: "I have been working on this script for quite some time now and I could easily relate to the psyche of the character as I used to emote out the character's nature at various stages of development. We had cast another actor in the lead role. But when he couldn't do it due to certain personal issues, it was relatively easy for me to step into the shoes of the character."

Another important role was given to Jishnu Raghavan, who had acted with Siddharth in Nammal. Nidra marks Jishnu's comeback, who took a brief hiatus to pursue projects outside filmdom. KPAC Lalitha, Bharathan's wife and Siddharth's mother, reprises the role she donned in the original film. Lalitha had worked with Siddharth in the short film Kaathu Kaathu which was directed by him. Vijay Menon, who played the male lead in the original, appears as the psychiatrist in this version.

=== Adaptation ===
Siddharth wanted to make his directorial debut by adapting the 1964 horror classic Bhargavi Nilayam which was written by noted author Vaikom Muhammad Basheer and directed by A. Vincent. The project was dropped in pre-production stages. Siddharth then began directing Mithram but the project had to shelved mid-way due to production problems. Siddharth decided to remake the 1981 film Nidra, which was directed by his father Bharathan. The original, which starred Shanthi Krishna and Vijay Menon in the lead roles, was a critical success although is not usually recognised as one of Bharathan's better creations. The new version is set in modern times and Siddharth considers it as a tribute to his father.

Siddharth says he chose Nidra of all his father's films because its story is relevant even now. Siddharth says, "If I have to remake a film, there should be something that I can convey through it. This story can happen even today, that too, during these times of mobile phones and Facebook. It has been set in a rural place like Chalakudy." The new version is contemporary and unfolds in a family who lives in a small town. Siddharth says, "The basic storyline hasn't changed much, but the content has changed. Or, let's say, the presentation has been changed, but the essence is still there." Some reinterpretations of the major elements and scenes of Nidra have also been done. The adapted screenplay was written by noted author Santhosh Echikkanam and Siddharth.

=== Filming ===
The film was jointly produced by Sadanandan Rangorath and Debobrath Mondal under the banner of Lucsam Creations, a company that ventured into film production with Salt N' Pepper in 2011. Principal photography started in December 2011 in Chalakudy, Kerala. Aranumula was initially selected as the major locale but was later changed. Besides Chalakudy where the film is mainly set, it was shot from different parts of Kerala. The climax scene of the film was shot from a pond in Chalakudy, which housed crocodiles. Siddharth and Rima Kallingal performed a swimming stunt in the pond, with the latter not even knowing how to swim. Rima was told about this scene a year before the shoot by Siddharth. "I didn't learn swimming, but I was mentally preparing myself to jump into the river," says Rima. Sameer Thahir wielded camera for the film.

About the cinematography, Siddharth says, "The cameraman is the director's eye and Sameer and I tried to capture interesting frames out of the sheer love for cinema. There was no ulterior motive of receiving accolades or anything; it all just fell into place." Nidra completed its production in January 2012, at a budget about 20 per cent less than the initially fixed amount. The film's producer Sadanandan says, "I have come across budget overshoots but have decided that if am not satisfied with a particular person, I won't do another project with that person. As producers, that is our right, as it is our blood and toil that go into making a movie! Nidra is a case in point, where careful and astute budgeting has reduced the costs because of control from our production team. If a producer remains vigilant and reaps profits that can mean more movies in the market and no producer is here to do only one film."

=== Music ===
The background score was composed by Prashant Pillai. The songs were composed by Jassie Gift who has included slow-paced and melodious compositions. Poet and lyricist Rafeeq Ahamed penned the lyrics for the songs.

== Reception ==
=== Critical ===
The film received positive reviews. Veeyen of Nowrunning.com rated it 3/5 and stated" "Sidharth Bharathan's Nidra could very well qualify as a complicated mood piece that is passionately charged with raw emotions. It tells a daymare of a story in which the viewer is forced to indulge in a free fall plunge into a world where madness and mayhem collaborate with the most central of all human emotions - love." The critic concluded the review saying, "As a tribute, this remake is perhaps the best that a son can offer to his legendary filmmaker dad! Bharathan, I'm sure would have been proud." Paresh C Palicha of Rediff.com rated the film 2.5/5 and commented that it "gives you a contemporary feel but it lacks the emotional tug of the films of this nature made in the past." However, he appreciated Sidharth for providing a contemporary feeling. The critic wrote, "Sidharth makes this story contemporary by introducing a philosophical angle debating the difference between sanity and insanity, the concept of reality, and even touching on environmental concerns." Sify.com's critic gave a verdict of "Above Average" and said, "It's one film that should be appreciated for its inherent sincerity." The critic, however, notes that Nidra "gives the feeling that it is a bit too fast-paced than one would have liked and events happen, at times in an undisciplined manner." Siddharth's and Rima's performances have been labelled as "the best performances in their careers", Sameer Thahir's visuals as "topnotch", Prashant Pillai's background score as "excellent" and Jassie Gift's tunes as melodious. The performances by the supporting cast including Jishnu, KPAC Lalitha, Thalaivasal Vijay and Sarayu were described as "impressive".

Neil Xavier of Yentha.com gave a rating of 8/10 and said, Nidra is a "well-crafted movie" and "is a visual treat and comes out as an emotionally rich and touching love story". Sidharth's acting is described as "one of the best performances of recent times" while the performances by Rima and Jishnu were also lauded. N. P. Sajish, in his review for Madhyamam, was mostly critical and stated that the new version is much inferior compared to the original which he regards as a "classic". He adds that Sidharth fails to bring any reinterpretation to the original film.

=== Commercial ===
Nidra released on 24 February 2012, along with the films Ee Adutha Kalathu and Ideal Couple. It failed to make a mark at the box office despite largely garnering positive reviews. Nidra even had to face holdover threats due to lack of viewer turnout. There were posts on social networking sites asking for media support, but the film turned out to be a commercial failure. This failure accounts mainly to the lack of promotion and the limited release it had. Sidharth says: "I received a standing ovation throughout Kerala in the first three days from the ardent film-loving junta. Also, I have still been getting praise from the handful who has watched the film. The failure of the film could be due to the film's mature subject of derangement, the impression that it's a remake and also its non-superstar cast." Siddharth adds that the team had run into few hurdles during the post-production phase due to which they had only limited time to promote the film.

== Awards and nominations ==
Year	Award	Category	Recipients	Result
2012	Kerala State Film Awards	Best Actress	Rima Kallingal	Won
2012	Kerala State Film Awards	Best Dubbing Artist	Vimmy Mariam George	Won

== See also ==
- Mental illness in films
