= Dhanyam =

- Directed by: Jayalal
- Written by: Rasheed Parackal
- Screenplay by: Rasheed Parackal
- Produced by: Joyson Puthukkattil
- Starring: Pratheesh Nandan; Pooja; Vijayan Chathannoor; Ambika Mohan
- Cinematography: R. Maniprasad
- Edited by: P. C. Mohan
- Music by: K. K. Sebastian
- Production company: Pooram Arts
- Distributed by: Screen Craft
- Release date: 16 March 2012
- Country: India
- Language: Malayalam

Dhanyam is a 2012 Indian Malayalam-language film directed by debutant Jayalal, starring newcomers Pratheesh Nandan and Pooja in the lead roles.

== Plot ==
Dhanyam tells about the virtues of Kerala village life and culture.
