= Nammal =

2002 Malayalam film by Kamal

- Soundtrack cover
- Directed by: Kamal
- Screenplay by: Kalavoor Ravikumar
- Story by: Balamuralikrishna
- Produced by: David Kachappally
- Starring: Jishnu Raghavan; Sidharth Bharathan; Renuka Menon; Bhavana
- Cinematography: Venugopal
- Edited by: K. Rajagopal
- Music by: Mohan Sithara
- Production company: Chinku Achu Cinemas
- Distributed by: Swargachithra Release
- Release date: 20 December 2002
- Running time: 152 minutes
- Country: India
- Language: Malayalam

Nammal (transl. Us) is a 2002 Indian Malayalam romantic comedy-drama film directed by Kamal and written by Kalavoor Ravikumar. The film stars Jishnu Raghavan and Sidharth Bharathan. It was the debut film of Jishnu Raghavan, Sidharth Bharathan, Renuka, and Bhavana. The music was composed by Mohan Sithara. The film was shot in Government Engineering College, Thrissur and Holy Trinity School, Kanjikode. It was remade in Telugu as Dost (2004).

Nammal was released on 20 December 2002 and was commercially successful.

== Plot ==
Snehalatha becomes the principal of a college where Shyam and Shivan are the heroes. Shyam and Shivan are fun-filled characters as well as naughty. Aparna, who happens to be the daughter of the principal's friend, is teased and ragged by the duo.

Aparna lodges a complaint, and Snehalatha takes action against Shyam and Shivan. Soon, to her surprise, she discovers that Shyam and Shivan are orphans, hardworking their way up the ladder, and their guardian is a priest. But the real twist to the story happens when Shyam and Shivan learn that one of them is her long-lost son.

== Cast ==
- Jishnu Raghavan as Shivan (voiceover by Mithun Ramesh)
- Sidharth Bharathan as Shyam; Shivan's best friend (voiceover by Sarath Das)
- Renuka Menon as Aparna; Shyam's girlfriend (voiceover by Sangeetha Mohan)
- Bhavana as Parimalam; A laundry girl in the colony
- Suhasini Maniratnam as Snehalatha; College Principal; Shyam's mother (voiceover by Bhagyalakshmi)
- Balachandra Menon as Sathyanathan; Shivan and Shyam's adoptive father
- Innocent as Shanmughan; Shivan and Shyam's neighbour
- Mithun Ramesh as Reji; Shyam and Shivan's rival (voiceover by Jis Joy)
- Vijeesh Vijayan as Jojo Thomas alias Noolunda; Shivan and Shyam's friend
- Yamuna Rani as Damayanthi
- Vignesh as Senthil; Parimalam's brother
- Ambika Mohan as Mariyamma; Jojo Thomas's mother
- Kulappulli Leela as Lakshmi; Snehalatha's servant
- T. P. Madhavan as Principal
- Shine Tom Chacko as Bus passenger
- Kalabhavan Shajohn as Puli Gopalan

== Soundtrack ==
The film's soundtrack contains five songs, all composed by Mohan Sithara. The lyrics were written by Kaithapram Damodaran. The soundtrack was a chartbuster upon its release.

No.	Title	Singer(s)
1	"Enkaralil"	Afsal, Franco, Chorus
2	"Ennamme"	K. J. Yesudas
3	"Sukhamaani Nilavu"	Vidhu Prathap, Jyotsna
4	"Kaathu Kaathoru"	Pushpavathi, Balu, Gopan, Sunil
5	"Sooryane"	M. G. Sreekumar, Rajesh Vijay
6	"Sukhamaani Nilavu"	Jyotsna

== Box office ==
Nammal was commercially successful.

== Awards ==
Nammal received major accolades at the Kerala State Film Awards, Kerala Film Critics Awards, and Mathrubhumi Film Awards in 2003.

Year	Award	Category	Recipients	Result	Ref
2002	Kerala Film Critics Awards	Best Newcomer	Jishnu Raghavan	Won	
2002	Kerala Film Critics Awards	Best Newcomer	Sidharth Bharathan	Won	
2002	Kerala Film Critics Awards	Second Best Film	David Kachappally	Won	
2002	Kerala State Film Awards	Best Film with Popular Appeal and Aesthetic Value	Kamal; David Kachapally	Won	
2003	Mathrubhumi Film Awards	Best Male Debut	Jishnu Raghavan	Won	
