= Silent Valley (2012 film) =

- Poster
- Directed by: Syed Usman
- Written by: M. R. Anoopraj
- Produced by: Mahi M. Manjith Divakar
- Cinematography: Raarish G.
- Edited by: Kappil Gopalakrishnan
- Music by: Shaheen Abbas
- Production company: God's Way Creation
- Distributed by: Renil Amba Films
- Release date: 15 June 2012
- Running time: 91 minutes
- Country: India
- Language: Malayalam

Silent Valley is a 2012 Malayalam thriller film directed by Syed Usman and starring newcomers Nidheesh and Roopasree in the lead roles.

== Plot ==
A group of youth plans to go for a picnic to a jungle after seeing a link in the internet. There they have to face some unexpected problems and the rest of the film unfolds the truth.

== Cast ==
- Nidheesh as Surya
- Roopasree as Reena
- Rithi Mangal as Shabaana
- Agatha Magnus as Saathi
- Julie as Elizabeth Joseph

== Production ==
The film was earlier titled Jungle. It was completely shot from Vagamon, Kerala.
