= Sidharth Bharathan =

Indian actor and filmmaker

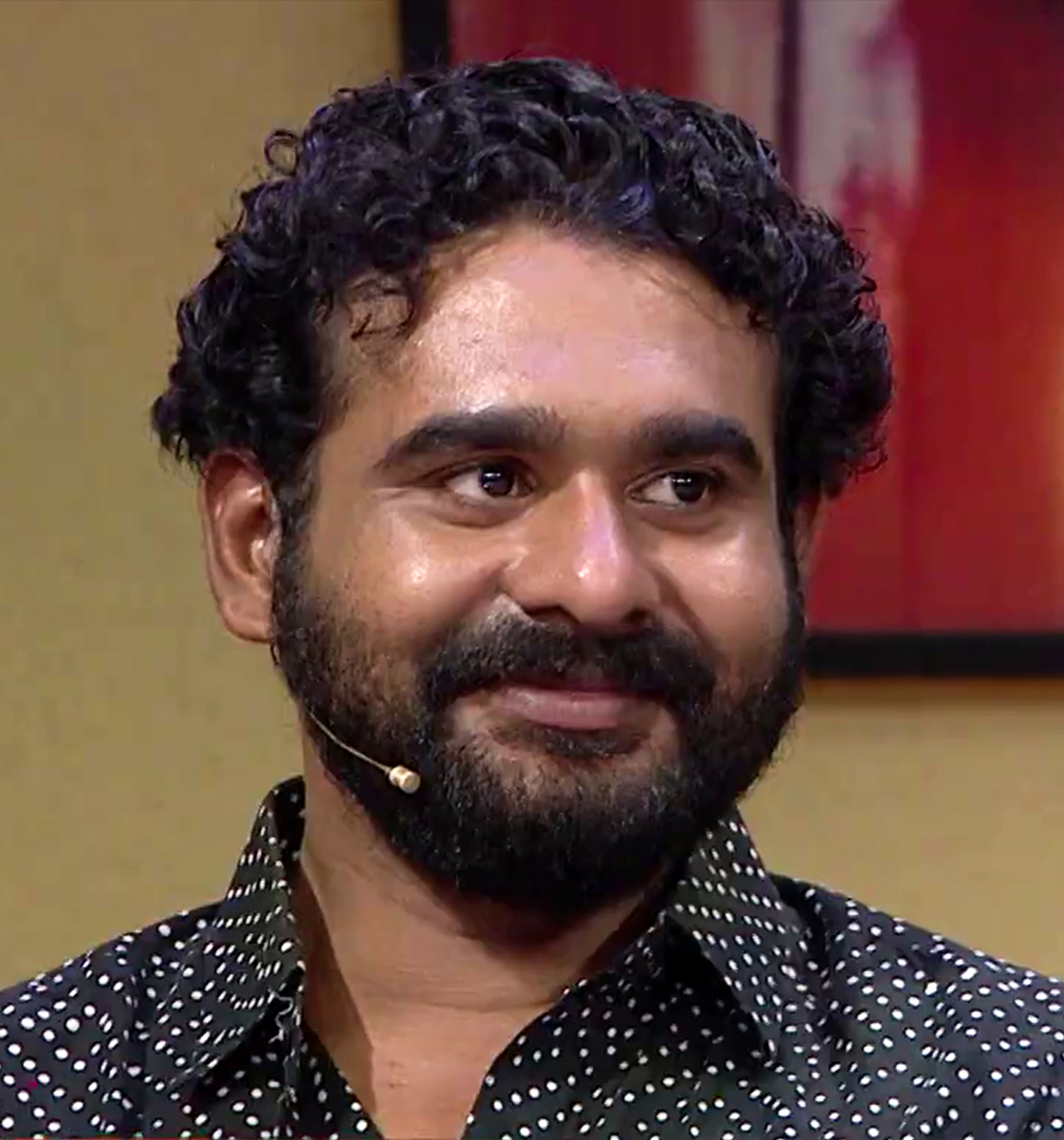
- Born: 26 May 1983 (age 43); Chennai, Tamil Nadu, India
- Education: SRM Institute of Science and Technology
- Occupations: Actor; director; screenwriter
- Years active: 2002–present
- Known for: Nammal (2002); Nidra (2012); Chandrettan Evideya (2015); Bramayugam (2024)
- Spouse(s): Anju Mohan Das (m. 2008; div. 2013) Sujina Sreedhar (m. 2019)
- Children: 1
- Parents: Bharathan (father); K. P. A. C. Lalitha (mother)
- Awards: Kerala Film Critics Awards, Kerala State Film Awards

Sidharth Bharathan (born 26 May 1983) is an Indian actor, screenwriter and film director who prominently works in Malayalam films. He made his acting debut in Nammal (2002) and directional debut in Nidra (2012).

== Early and personal life ==
Sidharth was born on 26 May 1983 to film director Bharathan and actress K. P. A. C. Lalitha. He was married to Anju Mohan Das since 12 December 2008 for about five years and later divorced in 2013. On 31 August 2019, he married Sujina and they have a daughter.

== Career ==
=== 2002–2004: Debut and breakthrough ===
Sidharth began his film career through the Malayalam film Nammal in 2002 along with Jishnu Raghavan and Bhavana and also he received Kerala Film Critics Association Awards for Best Debut Actor. And also acted in several films Rasikan, Youth Festival, Kakkakarumban and Ennittum along with Kaniha. Then, he had acted in Rebecca Uthup Kizhakkemala, Spirit and Olipporu in 2014. In 2023, he made his acting comebock through Vela and Bramayugam.

=== 2012–present: Directional debut and beyond ===
He made his directorial debut and played the lead role in Nidra and also acted as a lead actor along with Rima Kallingal, it was a remake of the 1981 Malayalam film of the same name directed by his father. He has also worked as a scenarist for the film Isha, a segment in the anthology film 5 Sundarikal. Also directed successful films Chandrettan Evideya, Djinn and Chathuram.

== Accident and aftermath ==
Sidharth was seriously injured in an accident on 11 September 2015. The Ford Figo car he was driving hit a wall on the road at Chambakkara near Kochi and the actor sustained serious injuries in his leg and head. He was in the ventilator of the Medical Trust Hospital.

== Filmography ==
=== As an actor ===
Year	Title	Role	Notes	Ref
2002	Nammal	Shyam	Debut film	
2004	Youth Festival	Arjun		
2004	Kakkakarumban	Ramesan		
2004	Rasikan	Sudhi		
2004	Ennittum	Jeeth		
2012	Nidra	Raju	Also director	
2012	Spirit	Sameer		
2013	Rebecca Uthup Kizhakkemala	Arjun		
2013	Olipporu			
2015	Njan Ninnodu Koodeyundu			
2016	Koppayile Kodumkattu			
2023	Vela	SI Ashok Kumar		
2024	Bramayugam	Kodumon Potti's cook		
2024	Sookshmadarshini	Dr. John		
2025	Bazooka	CI Arjun Ramaswamy		
2025	Aabhyanthara Kuttavaali	Peter		
2025	Dheeran	Gireeshan		
2025	Paranu Paranu Paranu Chellan			
2025	Flask			
2025	Sumathi Valavu	Chemban		
2025	Bha Bha Ba	Damodaran		
2026	Magic Mushrooms	Vasanthan Kumar		
2026	Spa			
2026	Sambhavam Adhyayam Onnu	Portuguese Spy		
2026	Karakkam	Inspector Kunjan Nambiar		
2026	Pradhama Drishtiya Kuttakkar	Dasan Puthenvedu		
2026	Dhoomakethu			

=== As a director ===
Year	Title	Notes
2012	Nidra	
2015	Chandrettan Evideya	
2017	Varnyathil Aashanka	
2022	Chathuram	
2023	Djinn	

== Accolades ==
Year	Award	Category	Work	Result	Ref.
2002	Kerala Film Critics Awards	Best New Comer	Nammal	Won	
2023	Master Vision International Awards	Best Director	Chathuram	Won	
2025	Kerala State Film Award	Best Supporting Actor	Bramayugam	Won	
