= List of Malayalam films of 2015 =

The tables list the Malayalam films released in theaters in the year 2015. Premiere shows and film festival screenings are not considered as releases for this list.

== Released films ==
Opening		Title	Director	Cast	Genre	Ref
J A N U A R Y	2	Akashangalil	Rixon Xavier	Shankar	Family	
J A N U A R Y	2	6	Guru Raja	Mukesh, Tini Tom, Guinness Pakru, Baburaj	Comedy	
J A N U A R Y	2	At Once	Syed Usman	Jagadheesh, Indrans, Swasika	Romance	
J A N U A R Y	9	Perariyathavar	Dr. Biju	Suraj Venjaramoodu, Indrans	Drama	
J A N U A R Y	9	Ellam Chettante Ishtam Pole	Haridas	Manikandan Pattambi	Family	
J A N U A R Y	9	Ammakkoru Tharattu	Sreekumaran Thampi	Suraj Venjaramoodu, Lakshmi Gopalaswamy, Manju Pillai, Sharada	Family	
J A N U A R Y	9	Mayapuri 3D	Mahesh Kesav	Kalabhavan Mani	Children's film	
J A N U A R Y	9	Village Guys	Shaan	Ashokan, Nakshatra	Drama	
J A N U A R Y	23	Mariyam Mukku	James Albert	Fahadh Faasil, Samuthirakani, Aju Varghese, Seema G. Nair, Manoj K. Jayan	Romance	
J A N U A R Y	23	Mili	Rajesh Pillai	Nivin Pauly, Amala Paul, Sai Kumar, Sanusha	Drama	
J A N U A R Y	23	Picket 43	Major Ravi	Prithviraj, Javed Jaffrey, Renji Panicker	Drama	
J A N U A R Y	23	Rasam	Rajeev Nath	Mohanlal, Indrajith, Nedumudi Venu, Varuna Shetty	Drama	
J A N U A R Y	30	Mashithandu	Anish Urumbil	Balachandran Chullikkadu, Seema G. Nair	Drama	
F E B R U A R Y	6	Aadu	Midhun Manuel Thomas	Jayasurya, Saiju Kurup, Sunny Wayne, Srinda Ashab	Romantic comedy	
F E B R U A R Y	6	Cinema @ PWD Rest House	V. V. Santhosh	Manikandan Pattambi, Sreejith Ravi, Mamukoya	Drama	
F E B R U A R Y	13	Saradhi	Gopalan Manoj	Sunny Wayne, Sreenivasan, Nedumudi Venu, Madhupal	Thriller	
F E B R U A R Y	13	Raag Rangeela	Yousuf Muhamed	Aadithyan, Druvan, Hanna Jayanth	Drama	
F E B R U A R Y	13	1000 – Oru Note Paranja Katha	A. R. C. Nair	Bharath, Mukesh, Maqbool Salmaan	Thriller	
F E B R U A R Y	19	Fireman	Dipu Karunakaran	Mammootty, Nyla Usha, Siddique, Unni Mukundan	Drama	
F E B R U A R Y	20	Haram	Vinod Sukumaran	Fahadh Faasil, Radhika Apte	Romance	
F E B R U A R Y	27	White Boys	Melila Rajasekhar	Vijayaraghavan, Joy Mathew	Drama	
F E B R U A R Y	27	Compartment	Salim Kumar	Kalabhavan Mani, Kalabhavan Shajon	Drama	
F E B R U A R Y	27	Namasthe Bali	K. V. Bejoy	Aju Varghese, Roma Asrani, Manoj K. Jayan, Devan	Drama	
F E B R U A R Y	27	Friendship	Khader Hasan	Sreejith Vijay	Comedy	
F E B R U A R Y	27	Alif	NK Muhammed Koya	Kalabhavan Mani, Lena, Nedumudi Venu	Social	
F E B R U A R Y	27	Maanikyam	R. J. Prasad	Sahil Suni, Ajaya Ghosh, Sree Laya	Drama	
F E B R U A R Y	27	Iruvazhi Thiriyunnidam	Biju C. Kannan	Kalabhavan Mani	Drama	
M A R C H	6	Nellikka	Bijith Bala	Atul Kulkarni, Sunny Wayne, Sija Rose	Romance	
M A R C H	6	Kalyanism	Anuram	Ananya, Mukesh, Kailash	Drama	
M A R C H	6	Rakshakan IPS	TS Gayakan	TS Gayakan, Basheer Hammed	Drama	
M A R C H	6	The Reporter	Venugopan	Samudrakani, Kailash, and Ananya	Thriller	
M A R C H	6	Onnam Loka Mahayudham	Sree varun	Aparna Gopinath, Tovino Thomas, Chemban Vinod Jose	Suspense Thriller	
M A R C H	6	Love Land	Haja Moinu	Kollam Thulasi, Archana, Surabhi	Romance	
M A R C H	13	Elanjikkavu P.O	Sangeeth	Mukesh, Nandini, Salim Kumar, P. C. George	Family	
M A R C H	13	Mathruvandanam	M K Devarajan	Jagathy Sreekumar, Sukumari, Saiju Kurup, K. P. A. C. Lalitha	Drama	
M A R C H	13	My Dear Maman	Sunny Rajan	Balan Vengara, Bijili	Drama	
M A R C H	13	Antivirus	Myjohn Britto	Amith Ami, Myjohn Britto	Horror	
M A R C H	13	Chamante Kabani	M K Devarajan	Suresh Gopi, Mala Aravindan, Boban Alumoodan	Drama	
M A R C H	20	You Too Brutus	Roopesh Peethambaran	Asif Ali, Rachana Narayanankutty, Sreenivasan, Honey Rose, Tovino Thomas	Thriller	
M A R C H	20	100 Days of Love	Jenuse Mohamed	Dulquer Salmaan, Nithya Menen, Sekhar Menon, Praveena, Vineeth	Romance	
M A R C H	20	Njan Ninnodu Koodeyundu	Priyanandanan	Sidharth Bharathan, Vinay Forrt, Madhupal, Navami, Aparna Vinod	Drama	
M A R C H	27	Oru Vadakkan Selfie	G. Prajith	Nivin Pauly, Aju Varghese, Neeraj Madhav, Manjima Mohan, Vineeth Sreenivasan	Comedy	
M A R C H	27	The Bail	Jayalal	Chembil Ashokan, Sreejith Ravi, Ammu	Thriller	
M A R C H	27	Ennum Eppozhum	Sathyan Anthikkad	Mohanlal, Manju Warrier, Innocent, Lena, Reenu Mathews	Drama	
A P R I L	4	Ivan Maryadaraman	Suresh Divakar	Dileep, Nikki Galrani	Comedy	
A P R I L	15	Bhaskar the Rascal	Siddique	Mammootty, Nayantara, Harisree Ashokan, Sanoop Santhosh	Comedy	
M A Y	1	She Taxi	Saji Surendran	Anoop Menon, Kavya Madhavan, Suraj Venjaramoodu, Tini Tom	Comedy	
M A Y	1	Chandrettan Evideya	Sidharth Bharathan	Dileep, Anusree, Namitha Pramod, Mukesh, K. P. A. C. Lalitha	Comedy Drama	
M A Y	1	Chirakodinja Kinavukal	Santhosh Viswanathan	Kunchacko Boban, Rima Kallingal, Sreenivasan, Joy Mathew	Comedy	
M A Y	8	Oru Second Class Yathra	Jexson Antony, Rejis Antony	Vineeth Sreenivasan, Nikki Galrani, Sreejith Ravi, Chemban Vinod Jose	Comedy	
M A Y	8	Lasagu	Sumod S Pillai, Gopu	Shanavas Shanu, Suresh Thiruvali, Arjun Krishnadev, Adithi Adithya, Samaja	Children's	
M A Y	14	Laila O Laila	Joshiy	Mohanlal, Amala Paul, Sathyaraj	Suspense Thriller	
M A Y	15	Nee-Na	Lal Jose	Vijay Babu, Ann Augustine, Deepti Sati, Sunil Sukhada	Drama	
M A Y	15	Sir C. P.	Shajoon Kariyal	Jayaram, Honey Rose, Seema, Rohini, Vijayaraghavan	Drama	
M A Y	15	Marutha	Syed Jafri	Devan, Sreejith Ravi, Mamukoya, Shamili Sounderajan	Thriller	
M A Y	22	Swargathekkal Sundaram	Manoj Aravindakshan	Sreenivasan, Mythili, Lal, Joy Mathew	Drama	
M A Y	22	Kumbasaram	Aneesh Anwar	Jayasurya, Honey Rose	Drama	
M A Y	29	Ivide	Shyamaprasad	Prithviraj Sukumaran, Nivin Pauly, Bhavana	Crime thriller	
M A Y	29	Premam	Alphonse Putharen	Nivin Pauly, Vinay Forrt, Shabareesh Varma, Krishna Shankar, Sai Pallavi, Anupama Parameshwaran, Madonna Sebastian	Romance	
J U N E	5	Samrajyam II: Son of Alexander	Perarasu	Unni Mukundan, Akanksha Puri, Manoj K. Jayan, Vijayaraghavan, Riyaz Khan	Action	
J U N E	5	Unto the Dusk	Sajin Babu	Sanal Aman, Shilpa Kavalam	[Social]	
J U N E	5	CR No: 89	Sudevan	Ashok Kumar, Pradeep Kumar, Santhosh Babu	Social	
J U N E	5	Lukka Chuppi	Bash Muhammad	Jayasurya, Murali Gopy, Remya Nambeesan, Joju George	Comedy	
J U N E	5	Nirnayakam	V. K. Prakash	Asif Ali, Malavika Mohanan, Nedumudi Venu, Tisca Chopra, Prem Prakash	Thriller Drama	
J U N E	12	Thinkal Muthal Velli Vare	Kannan Thamarakkulam	Jayaram, Rimi Tomy, Anoop Menon	Family Comedy	
J U N E	12	Appavum Veenjum	Viswanathan	Sunny Wayne, Ramya Krishnan, Prathap K. Pothan	Drama	
J U N E	12	8th March	Albert Antoni	Baburaj, Rahul Madhav, Ekatrina	Suspense Thriller	
J U N E	19	Kanthari	Ajmal	Rachana Narayanankutty, Shekhar Menon	Drama	
J U N E	19	3 Wikkattinu 365 Runs	K. K. Haridas	Jagathy Sreekumar, Kalpana, Cochin Haneefa	Drama	
J U N E	19	Kidney Biriyani	Madhu Thathampalli	Anil Panachooran, Madhu, Ranjith	Drama	
J U N E	19	Aashamsakalode Anna	Sangeeth Louis	Madhu, Captain Raju, Indrans	Drama	
J U N E	19	32aam Adhyayam 23aam Vaakyam	Arjun Prabhakaran, Gokul Ramakrishnan	Govind Padmasurya, Miya, Lal, Arjun Nandhakumar	Drama	
J U N E	26	Lavender	Altas T. Ali	Rahman, Elham Mirza, Anoop Menon, Nishan	Romance	
J U N E	26	St Mary'sile Kolapathakam	HN Shijoy	Sudheer Karamana, Aparna Nair, Sreejith Nair	Drama	
J U N E	26	Monsoon	Suresh Gopal	John Jacob, Aisha Azcym, Lalu Alex, Joy Mathew, Indrans, Kochu Preman, Vanitha	Drama	
J U L Y	3	Aval Vannathinu Shesham	Chandru Manickavasagam	Maneesh Kurup, Baby Nayanthara, Rosin Jolly	Drama	
J U L Y	3	The Legend Of Molokai	Tony P Varghese	Fr. Ranjth	Drama	
J U L Y	10	Loka Samastha	Sajith Sivan	Aju Varghese, Anu Mohan	Drama	
J U L Y	10	Oru New Generation Pani	Sankar Narayanan	Biyon Gemini, Devan	Drama	
J U L Y	10	Wonderful Journey	Dileep Thomas	Kalabhavan Mani, Baburaj, Radha Varma	Drama	
J U L Y	10	Pickles	Akbar Shifas	Harikrishnan, Jeens	Drama	
J U L Y	10	Plus or Minus	Janardanan	Devan, Indrans	Family	
J U L Y	10	Kanyaka Talkies	K. R. Manoj	Murali Gopy, Lena	Family	
J U L Y	17	Madhura Naranga	Sugeeth	Kunchacko Boban, Biju Menon, Parvathy Ratheesh, Neeraj Madhav	Comedy	
J U L Y	17	Acha Dhin	G. Marthandan	Mammootty, Manasi Sharma, Pathmaraj Ratheesh	Family	
J U L Y	18	KL 10 Patthu	Mohsin Parari	Unni Mukundan, Chandini Sreedharan, Saiju Kurup, Aju Varghese, Neeraj Madhav	Family	
J U L Y	18	Love 24x7	Sreebala K. Menon	Dileep, Sreenivasan, Suhasini, Nikhila Vimal, Lena, Sashi Kumar	Romance	
J U L Y	24	Kasthoorba	Siddik Paravoor	Siddik Paravoor, Sulfi Azhico, Vinod Kovoor, Shivaji Guruvayoor	Drama	
J U L Y	31	Ayal Njanalla	Vineeth Kumar	Fahadh Faasil, Mrudula Murali, Renji Panicker, Sijoy Varghese, S. P. Sreekumar	Comedy	
J U L Y	31	Jilebi	Arun Sekhar	Jayasurya, Remya Nambeesan, Vijaya Raghavan	Drama	
J U L Y	31	Rudra Simhasanam	Shibu Gangadharan	Suresh Gopi, Nikki Galrani, Nedumudi Venu, Shwetha Menon, Kaniha	Thriller	
J U L Y	31	Vishwasam... Athallae Ellaam	Jayaraj Vijay	Shine Tom Chacko, Ansiba Hassan	Drama	
A U G U S T	7	Rasputin	Jinu G Daniel	Vinay Forrt, Sreenath Bhasi, Aju Varghese, Vandana Menon	Comedy	
A U G U S T	7	Karma Cartel	Vinod Bharathan	Vinay Forrt, Sabumon Abdusamad	avant-garde	
A U G U S T	7	Mumbai Taxi	Fazil Basheer	Badusha	Drama	
A U G U S T	14	High Alert	Chandra Mahesh	H. H. Mahadev, Anjana Menon, Suman, Vinod Kumar Alva, Kalabhavan Shajon, Dharmajan Bolgatty, Anoop Chandran	Action	
A U G U S T	14	Uthara Chemmeen	Benny Aasamsa	Biyon, Ansiba Hassan	Drama	
A U G U S T	14	Just Married	Sajan Johny	Sreeram Ramachandran, Devan	Comedy	
A U G U S T	20	Loham	Renjith	Mohanlal, Andrea Jeremiah, Aju Varghese, Siddique, Ajmal Ameer	Drama	
A U G U S T	21	Thaarakangale Saakshi	Gopakumar Narayanapilla	Madhupal, Kalasala Babu, Mamukoya, TP Madhavan	Drama	
A U G U S T	21	Puzhapolaval	G. Prasad Edward	Gopika Suresh, Upaneesh Unnikrishnan	Thriller	
A U G U S T	21	Moonnaam Naal	Prakash Kunjan	Kalabhavan Mani, Indrans, Sruthi Madhav, Shivaji Guruvayoor	Drama	
A U G U S T	21	Kerala Today	Kapil	Maqbool Salmaan, Itti Acharya, Sreejith Ravi, Sunil Sukhada	Action	
A U G U S T	27	Utopiayile Rajavu	Kamal	Mammootty, Jewel Mary, S. P. Sreekumar	Satire comedy	
A U G U S T	27	Double Barrel	Lijo Jose Pellissery	Prithviraj, Indrajith, Arya, Asif Ali, Swati Reddy, Isha Sharvani, Sunny Wayne, Vijay Babu, Rachana Narayanankutty	Comedy thriller	
A U G U S T	27	Jamna Pyari	Thomas Sebastian	Kunchako Boban, Joy Mathew, Aju Varghese, Suraj Venjaramoodu	Romance	
A U G U S T	28	Kunjiramayanam	Basil Joseph	Vineeth Sreenivasan, Dhyan Sreenivasan, Srinda Ashab, Sneha Unnikrishnan, Aju Varghese	Comedy	
S E P T E M B E R	8	Onnum Onnum Moonu	Abhilash S B, Bijoy Joseph, VS Sreekanth	Kalabhavan Mani, Arun, Irshad, Indrans, Sathaar, Leona Lishoy	anthology film	
S E P T E M B E R	11	TP 51	Moidu Thazhath	Devi Ajith, Shivaji Guruvayoor, Riyaz Khan, Ramesh Vadakara	Drama	
S E P T E M B E R	18	Ennu Ninte Moideen	R. S. Vimal	Prithviraj, Parvathy, Tovino Thomas, Lena, Sai Kumar, Bala	Romance	
S E P T E M B E R	18	Njan Samvidhanam Cheyyum	Balachandra Menon	Balachandra Menon, Gayathri Shankar, Menaka, Raveendran, Sreekanth Sasikanth	Drama	
S E P T E M B E R	18	Urumbukal Urangarilla	Jiju Asokan	Vinay Forrt, Ananya, Chemban Vinod Jose, Aju Varghese, Kalabhavan Shajon, Innocent	Drama	
S E P T E M B E R	24	Kohinoor	Vinay Govind	Asif Ali, Indrajith Sukumaran, Aju Varghese, Chemban Vinod Jose, Vinay Forrt, Bhavana	Heist	
S E P T E M B E R	24	Life of Josutty	Jeethu Joseph	Dileep, Rachana Narayanankutty, Aqsa Bhatt, Suraj Venjaramoodu	Romantic drama	
S E P T E M B E R	25	Ain	Sidharth Siva	Mohammad Mustafa		
S E P T E M B E R	25	Kaliyachan	Farooq Abdul Rahman	Manoj K. Jayan, Vaiga	Drama	
O C T O B E R	2	Kadhayulloru Pennu	P. Musthafa	Ishanth Sukumaran, Nuzrath Jehan	Social	
O C T O B E R	2	Saigal Padukayanu	Sibi Malayil	Shine Tom Chacko, Ramya Nambeesan	Drama	
O C T O B E R	2	Oraalppokkam	Sanal Kumar Sasidharan	Prakash Bare, Meena Kandaswamy	Drama	
O C T O B E R	9	Namukkore Aakaasam	Pradeep Mullanezhi	Joy Mathew Irshad	Drama	
O C T O B E R	9	Chila Kudumba Chithrangal	Suresh Kandalloor	Santhosh Kalabhavan, Shyamili	Drama	
O C T O B E R	9	Pathemari	Salim Ahmed	Mammootty, Sreenivasan, Jewel Mary	Drama	
O C T O B E R	9	Ithinumappuram	Manoj Alunkal	Riyaz Khan, Meera Jasmine	Drama	
O C T O B E R	16	Amar Akbar Anthony	Nadirshah	Prithviraj Sukumaran, Indrajith Sukumaran, Jayasurya, Akanksha Puri, Namitha Pramod	Comedy	
O C T O B E R	16	Lord Livingstone 7000 Kandi	Anil Radhakrishnan Menon	Kunchacko Boban, Bharath, Reenu Mathews, Sunny Wayne, Chemban Vinod Jose, Jacob Gregory, Sudheer Karamana	Fantasy	
O C T O B E R	16	Signal	Deva Kumar	Jeevan Kalathodu, Ramis Raja, Ambika Mohan, Shivaji Guruvayoor	Drama	
O C T O B E R	16	Vidooshakan	T. K. Santhosh	V. K. Prakash, Indrans	Historical	
O C T O B E R	16	Nikah	Asad Alavil	Sreenath Bhasi, Sekhar Menon, Samskruthy Shenoy	Drama	
O C T O B E R	22	Kanal	M. Padmakumar	Mohanlal, Anoop Menon, Pratap Pothan, Honey Rose	Suspense Thriller	
O C T O B E R	23	Rani Padmini	Aashiq Abu	Manju Warrier, Rima Kallingal, Sajitha Madathil, Sreenath Bhasi	Thriller Travelogue	
N O V E M B E R	6	Ben	Vipin Atlee	Gourav Menon	Psychological Children's	
N O V E M B E R	6	Ottaal	Jayaraj	Ashanth K. Shah, Kumarakom Vasudevan, Shine Tom Chacko	Biographical drama	
N O V E M B E R	6	Salt Mango Tree	Rajesh Nair	Biju Menon, Lakshmi Priyaa Chandramouli, Suhasini Maniratnam, Paris Laxmi, Indrans, Sarayu, Sudheer Karamana	Comedy	
N O V E M B E R	13	Anarkali	Sachy	Prithviraj Sukumaran, Biju Menon, Miya, Priyal Gor, Kabir Bedi, Samskruthy Shenoy, Sudev Nair, Arun, Suresh Krishna, Shyamaprasad, Major Ravi, Renji Panicker, Anu Sithara	Comedy Romantic Thriller	
N O V E M B E R	13	Ilamveyil	Shiju Balagopalan	Sumith Raghav, Deekshith Dileep, Jayalakshmi	Family	
N O V E M B E R	20	Su Su Sudhi Vathmeekam	Ranjith Sankar	Jayasurya, Swathy Narayanan, Shivada Nair, Aju Varghese, Mukesh, KPAC Lalitha	Comedy	
N O V E M B E R	20	Rajamma @ Yahoo	Reghu Rama Varma	Kunchacko Boban, Asif Ali, Nikki Galrani, Anusree	Comedy	
N O V E M B E R	20	Akkaldhamayile Pennu	Jairam Kailas	Shweta Menon, Vineeth, Malavika, Sudheer Karamana	Drama	
N O V E M B E R	27	Aana Mayil Ottakam	Jayakrishnan Anil Sig	Indrans, Mithun Murali, Balu Varghese, Sunil Sugatha	Anthology	
N O V E M B E R	27	Thilothama	Preethi Panicker	Rachana Narayanankutty, Madhu, Siddique, Manoj K. Jayan	Comedy	
N O V E M B E R	27	Sughamayirikkatte	Reji Prabhakaran	Archana Kavi, Vineeth	Drama	
N O V E M B E R	28	Savam	Don Palathara	Vishnu Dath, Deepak Divakar	Black comedy	
D E C E M B E R	4	ATM	Jespal Shanmugan	Jackie Shroff, Bhagath Manuel, Subiksha	Heist	
D E C E M B E R	4	Rockstar	V. K. Prakash	Siddharth Menon, Anumol, Krishnachandran, M. Jayachandran, Mallika Sukumaran, Poornima Bhagyaraj, Prakash Bare, Sona Nair	Fantasy	
D E C E M B E R	4	Valiya Chirakulla Pakshikal	Dr. Biju	Kunchako Boban, Nedumudi Venu, Suraj Venjaramoodu, Salim Kumar, Prakash Bare	Social	
D E C E M B E R	4	My God	M. Mohanan	Suresh Gopi, Honey Rose, Sreenivasan, Lena	Family	
D E C E M B E R	11	Kukkiliyar	Nemom Pushparaj	Manoj K. Jayan, Archana Kavi	Drama	
D E C E M B E R	11	John Honai	T. A. Thaufeek	Mukesh, Siddique, Jagadheesh, Ashokan, S. P. Sreekumar	Comedy	
D E C E M B E R	11	Ulvili	Break Mujeeb	Obeid Ali, Dilna Sharon, Bindu Anthikkaadu	Drama	
D E C E M B E R	11	Ariyathe Ishtmayi	Pradeep Raj	Kulappulli Leela, Boban Alummoodan, Kalasala Babu, Ranjith Raj, Noby Marcose	Romance	
D E C E M B E R	11	Female Unnikrishnan	K. B. Madhu	Suraj Venjaramoodu, Mahalakshmi, Anoop Menon	Comedy	
D E C E M B E R	11	One Day	Sunil V. Panicker	Maqbool Salmaan	Thriller Drama	
D E C E M B E R	11	Ormakalil Oru Manjukaalam	Antony Abraham	Janardhanan, Jagadheesh, Indrans	Drama	
D E C E M B E R	11	Karie	Naranippuzha Shanavas	Gopu Kesav, Rammohan Ravindran	Drama	
D E C E M B E R	12	Daivathinte Kayyopp	Benny Ashamsa	Madhu, Urmila Unni	Drama	
D E C E M B E R	24	Jo and the Boy	Rojin Thomas	Manju Warrier, Master Sanoop, Sudheer Karamana	Social Drama Comedy	
D E C E M B E R	24	Charlie	Martin Prakkat	Dulquer Salmaan, Parvathi Menon, Aparna Gopinath, Chemban Vinod Jose, Neeraj Madhav, Kalpana, K.P.A.C. Lalitha, Tovino Thomas, Ramesh Pisharody, Nedumudi Venu	Thriller	
D E C E M B E R	25	Two Countries	Shafi	Dileep, Mamta Mohandas, Mukesh	Comedy	
D E C E M B E R	25	Adi Kapyare Kootamani	John Varghese	Dhyan Sreenivasan, Aju Varghese, Namitha Pramod, Neeraj Madhav	Comedy	

== Dubbed films ==
Movies that were dubbed into Malayalam
Opening	Title	Director(s)	Original film		Cast	Ref.
Opening	Title	Director(s)	Film	Language	Cast	Ref.
2 January	Sand City	Shankar	Manal Naharam	Tamil	Shankar, Prajin, Gautham P. Krishna, Varuna Shetty	
2 January	Ekalavya		Govindudu Andarivadele	Telugu	Ram Charan, Kajal Aggarwal	
30 January	No. 1		1: Nenokkadine	Telugu	Mahesh Babu, Kriti Sanon	
6 March	Sarvadipan		Ramayya Vasthavayya	Telugu	Jr NTR, Shruthi Hassan	
24 April	S/O Satyamurthy	Trivikram Srinivas	S/O Satyamurthy	Telugu	Allu Arjun, Samantha Ruth Prabhu, Adah Sharma, Upendra	
12 June	My Hero Mythri		Mythri	Kannada	Puneeth Rajkumar, Mohanlal, Bhavana	
3 July	Chakravyooham		Brindavanam	Telugu	Jr NTR, Kajal Aggarwal, Samantha Ruth Prabhu	
10 July	Baahubali: The Beginning		Baahubali: The Beginning	Telugu / Tamil	Prabhas, Anushka Shetty, Tamannaah Bhatia, Rana Daggubati, Ramya Krishnan, Sudeep, Nassar	
10 September	Rudhran		Bujjigadu	Telugu	Prabhas, Trisha	
24 September	Mirchi		Mirchi	Telugu	Prabhas, Anushka Shetty	
9 October	Rudhramadevi	Gunasekhar	Rudhramadevi	Telugu	Anushka Shetty, Rana Daggubati, Nithya Menen, Allu Arjun, Prakash Raj	
30 October	Mantra 2		Mantra 2	Telugu	Charmee Kaur Chethan	
27 November	Bruce Lee – The Fighter		Bruce Lee - The Fighter	Telugu	Ram Charan, Rakul Preet Singh, Kriti Kharbanda	
11 December	Rebel		Rebel	Telugu	Prabhas, Tamannaah, Deeksha Seth	

== Notable deaths ==
Celebrities who dies during the year
Month	Date	Name	Age	Profession	Notable films
January	9	P. K. Kaimal (Thirumeni Pictures)	93	Distributor, Producer	Bhoomidevi Pushpiniyayi • Omanakuttan • Swantham Enna Padam •
January	19	EK Thyagarajan	75	Producer	Panchathanthram • Palaazhi Madhanam • Mudramothiram • Ithikkara Pakki • Mahabali •
January	28	Mala Aravindan	72	Actor	Thaaraavu • Loose Loose Arappiri Loose • Pappan Priyappetta Pappan • Sandesam • August Club •
February	4	Jithin Shyam	68	Music director	Thanal • Thaliritta Kinakkal • Ponmudi • Visa • Sundari Neeyum Sundaran Njanum •
February	25	A. Vincent	88	Cinematographer, Director	Neelakuyil • Bhargavi Nilayam • Murapennu • Thulabharam • Asuravithu •
March	4	Vilasini Ramachandran	62	Actress	Bhakthakuchela • Kadalamma • Laila Majnu • Moodupadam •
March	16	Bombay S. Kamal	83	Musician	Evide En Prabhatham • Nilavilakku • Sheershakam • Shanthi Nilayam •
March	21	Yusufali Kechery	81	Lyricist, Director, Producer	Moodupadam • Sindooracheppu • Neelathamara • Dhwani • Ghazal • Mazha
March	27	Sreeni	70	Art Director, Director,	Akkaldama • Pathinaalaam Raavu • Balettan
April	9	Ayiroor Sadasivan	78	Singer	Chaayam • Maram • Love Marriage •
June	10	Velliman Vijayan	69	Script Writer	Aakrosam • Manassariyaathe • Belt Mathai •
June	14	Kannur Salim	58	Singer	Manithali • Paalam • Naayakan (Vaa Kuruvi Varu Kuruvi) •
June	23	Alex Mathew	57	Actor	Thoovanathumbikal • Parampara • Rajavinte Makan •
June	23	S Thankappan	76	Producer, Writer	Thakilukottamburam, "Baalyam"
June	28	KPAC Krishnakumari	65	Actor	Umma • Mucheettukalikkarante Makal
June	29	Thevalakkara Chellappan(Prashanth)	68	Director	Athinumappuram • Aalorungi Arangorungi
July	13	Kannan	44	Music director	Swaasam
July	14	M. S. Viswanathan	87	Music director	Lanka Dahanam • Rajayogam • Ormakal Marikkumo • Indradhanussu • Ariyaatha Veethikal • Iyer the Great • Amma Ammaayiyamma
July	18	Shilpa	19	Actress	Superstar Santhosh Pandit • Kalidasan Kavithayezhuthukayanu • Njan Samvidhanam Cheyyum
July	24	KG Sathar	87	Musician, Singer, Lyricist	Aadyarathri • Ibileesinte makkal • Makkathu Ponore
August	8	Vellanad Narayanan	74	Lyricist, Screenplay	Velichamillatha Veedhi, "Saraswatheeyaamam"
August	9	Krishna Elamon	96	Sound Recordist	Padatha Painkili • Kumaarasambhavam • Hridayam Oru Kshethram
August	19	Paravoor Bharathan	86	Actor	Rakthabandham • Chemmeen • Meleparambil Aanveedu
August	19	A J Joseph	70	Music Director	Ente Kaanakkuyil • Ee Kaikalil • Sneha Pratheekam(Devotional Album)
September	20	Radhika Thilak	45	Singer	Ottayal Pattalam • Guru • Kanmadam • Nivedyam(Devotional Album)
October	02	Mathew Paul	60	Director	Ayyappantamma Neyyappam Chuttu
October	09	Ravindra Jain	71	Music Director	Sujatha • Sukham Sukhakaram • Aakaasathinte Niram
October	11	Manorama	78	Actor, Singer	Vidyarthkale Ithile Ithile • Aankiliyude Thaaraattu • Seethakalyanam
