= Kulappulli Leela =

Indian actress

- Born: Palakkad, Kerala
- Occupation: Actress
- Years active: 1998–present
- Spouse: Bhuvanachandran Nair
- Parent(s): Raman Nair; Rukmini Amma

Kulappulli Leela is an Indian actress who predominantly appears in Malayalam cinema, Tamil cinema and television. She has mostly done comedic roles, and has appeared in over 350 films. She began her career acting through theatre dramas.

== Early life ==
Leela was born in the Palakkad district to Raman Nair and Rukmini Amma. Her father is from Kozhikode, and her mother is from the Palakkad district.

== Filmography ==
=== Malayalam ===
==== 1990s ====
Year	Title	Role	Notes
1998	Ayal Kadha Ezhuthukayanu	Thresiamma	

==== 2000s ====
Year	Title	Role	Notes
2000	Madhuranombarakattu	Leelavathi teacher	
2001	Narendran Makan Jayakanthan Vaka	Sharada	
2001	Soothradharan		
2002	Nammal		
2002	Grand Mother		
2003	Kasthooriman	Raji's mother-in-law	
2003	Mizhi Randilum	Bhargavi	
2003	Hariharan Pilla Happy Aanu		
2003	Manassinakkare		
2003	Pulival Kalyanam	Kuttappan's mother	
2003	Saudhamini	Kallikutty	
2003	Kasthooriman	Raji's mother-in-law	
2003	Ente Ammakku		Short film
2004	Black	Veronica	
2004	Chathikkatha Chanthu	Chandhu's mother	
2004	Freedom		
2004	Mampazhakkalam	Chakka Ammayi	
2004	Sethurama Iyer CBI	Servant (Mariyakutty)	
2004	Thudakkam	Narayaniyamma	
2005	Bunglavil Outha		
2005	Alice in Wonderland	Martha	
2005	Bus Conductor		
2005	Chandrolsavam	Ramanunni's Mother	
2005	OK Chacko Cochin Mumbai	Pathumma	
2005	Police	Rajamma	
2005	Udayon	Kuttiyamma	
2006	Moonnamathoral		
2006	Balram vs Tharadas	Prisoner	
2007	Black Cat	Kathreena	
2007	Changathipoocha	Aiswaryan's mother	
2007	Nanma	Jaanu	
2007	Thakarachenda		
2008	SMS		
2008	Aandavan	Mariyamma	
2008	Annan Thampi		
2008	De Ingottu Nokkiye	Servant	
2008	Jubilee	Karthayani	
2008	Robo		
2008	Sultan		
2008	Twenty:20	Servant	
2008	Shakespeare M.A. Malayalam	Philomina	
2009	Ivar Vivahitharayal	Fish seller	
2009	Paribhavam		
2009	Dr. Patient	Eliamma	
2009	Utharaswayamvaram	Fortune teller	

==== 2010s ====
Year	Title	Role	Notes
2010	Annarakkannanum Thannalayathu		
2010	Ringtone		
2010	9 KK Road		
2010	Drona 2010	Jameela	
2010	Fiddle		
2010	Kaaryasthan	Bus Passenger	
2010	Nizhal		
2010	Sufi Paranja Katha		
2010	Best Actor	Servant at Lal Jose's House	
2010	Rama Ravanan	Rajamma	
2010	Thanthonni		
2010	Inganeyum Oral	Kamalakshi	
2011	101 Uruppika		
2011	Female Unnikrishnan	Maid	
2011	Lucky Jokers	Servant	
2011	Manikyakkallu		Cameo
2011	Nadakame Ulakam		
2011	Sandwich	Murugan's mother	
2011	Swargam 9 KM		
2011	Kudumbasree Travels	Kunjannamma	
2011	Manushya Mrugam	Thresiamma	
2011	Teja Bhai & Family	Ramani	
2012	Bhaghavathipuram		
2012	Ennennum Ormmakkayi		
2012	Ezham Suryan	Omana	
2012	Ina		
2012	Kalikalam	Nani	
2012	Prabhuvinte Makkal	Cheriyamma Janu	
2012	Themmadikkootam		
2012	Theruvu Nakshatrangal	Janaki	
2012	Vaidooryam		
2012	Doctor Innocent aanu	Thresiamma	
2012	Hero		
2013	Breaking News Live		
2013	Progress Report	Mariya	
2013	Amen	Therutha	
2013	Entry	Chinnamma	
2013	My Fan Ramu		
2013	Nadodimannan	Leela	
2013	Vallatha Pahayan	Naani Thala	
2014	Manja	Jackson's mother	
2014	Mylanchi Monchulla Veedu		
2014	Nattarangu		
2014	Njaanaannu Party		
2014	Odum Raja Aadum Rani		
2014	Ottamandhaaram		
2014	Raktharakshassu 3D		
2014	Tharangal		
2014	Wonderful Journey		
2014	Maramkothi	Marutha Mariya	
2015	Ariyahte Ishtamyi		
2015	Elinjikkavu PO		
2015	Ithinumappuram	Sarasu	
2015	Kanthari		
2015	Kidney Biriyani		
2015	Kunjiramayanam	Kuttan's mother	
2015	Ormakalil Oru Manjukaalam	Khadeejumma	
2015	Uthara Chemmeen		
2016	Dum		
2016	Kattumakkan		
2016	Noolppaalam		
2016	Oru Muthassi Gadha		
2016	Paulettante Veedu	Mariyamma	
2016	Poyi Maranju Parayathe		
2017	Kuntham		
2017	Oru Visheshapetta Biriyani Kissa		
2018	Daivame Kaithozham K. Kumar Akanam	Narayani	
2018	Dustbin		
2018	Kuttanadan Marpappa	Motta's mother	
2018	Mattanchery		
2018	Oru Pazhaya Bomb Kadha	Bhavyan's mother	
2018	Sakhavinte Priyasakhi	Dakshayini	
2018	Suvarna Purushan		
2018	Theetta Rappai		
2018	Wonder Boys		
2018	Daivam Sakshi	Ammini	
2018	Ippozhum Eppozhum Sthuthi Ayirikkatte		
2018	Mottitta Mullakal		
2018	Thanaha	Ammini	
2018	Vallikudilile Vellakkaran		
2019	Makkana		
2019	Moonam Pralayam		
2019	An International Local Story	Mannavendran's mother	
2019	Freakens		
2019	Onnam Sakshi		

==== 2020s ====
Year	Title	Role	Notes
2020	Thallumpidi		
2020	Varkey		
2020	Vahini	Madhavi Amma	
2021	Cabin	Rukku	
2021	Enpathukalile Ebhyanmar		
2022	5il Oral Thaskaran	Naniyamma	
2022	Anandakalyanam		
2022	Karnan Napoleon Bhagath Singh		
2022	Nipah		
2022	Oru Pakka Nadan Premam		
2022	Ulkkazhcha	School cook	
2022	College Cuties		
2022	Kadal Kuthira	Margret	
2023	Rani		
2024	Panchayath Jetty		
2024	Bad Boyz	CPO Leela	
2024	Hello Mummy	Wedding guest	Cameo
2026	Sathyathil Sambhavichath	Alphonsa	
TBA	Kidukkachi Aliyan	Paru Amma	

=== Tamil ===
Year	Title	Role	Notes
1995	Muthu	Malayali	Uncredited
2005	Kasthuri Maan	Muniyamma	
2016	Marudhu	Maariamma	
2016	Nee Enbathu		
2018	Naachiyaar		
2019	Airaa	Parvathy	
2021	Annaatthe	Kaalaiyan's grandmother	
2021	Aranmanai 3	Valliamma	
2021	Master	Juvenile prison cook	
2021	Chinnanjiru Kiliye		
2022	Kombu Vatcha Singamda	Ragini's grandmother	
2023	Yaanai Mugathaan	Matha Bhairavi Mangatha	
2024	Nanban Oruvan Vantha Piragu	Anand’s grandmother	
2024	Boat	Muthumaari	
2026	Parasakthi	Muthammal	

== Television ==
TV series

- 2002 Abhayam
- 2003 Guru
- 2018 Mizhineerpoovukal – telefilm
- 2005 Kunjunju Kathakal (Asianet)
- 2013 Valsalyam (Surya TV)
- 2005 Paribhavam Parvathy (Asianet)
- 2016 Sangathi Contra (Asianet)
- 2006 Sanmanassullavarkku Samadhanam (Asianet)
- 2009 Veendum Chila Veettuviseshangal (Asianet)
- 2008 Enkilum Ente Gopalakrishna (Asianet)
- 2005 Kochu Thresya Kochu (Kairali TV)
- 2007 Velankani Mathavu (Surya TV)
- 2006 Ettu sundarikalum Njanum (Surya TV)
- 2007 Ente Manasaputhri (Asianet)
- 2006 Thulabharam (Surya TV)
- 2004 Minnukettu (Surya TV)
- 2013-14 Nandhanam (Surya TV)
- 2012 Pattukalude Paattu (Surya TV)
- 2008 Kudumbarahasyam
- 2004 Calling Bell (Surya TV)
- 2000 Snehanjali
- 2007 Aliyanmarum Penganmarum (Amtrita TV)
- 2012 Ammayikakkante Visheshangal
- 2011 Padichapathoonte Veedu
- 2012 Vrindavanam(Asianet)
- 2014 Kudumbasametham Mannikutty (Jaihind)
- 2012 Mayamadhavam (Surya TV)
- 2013 Penmanasu (Surya TV)
- 2011 Manassu Parayunna Karyangal (Mazhavil Manorama)
- 2015 Mayamohini (Mazhavil Manorama)
- 2016-17 Decent Family (Jaihind)
- Vallarpadathamma(Shalom TV)
- 2016 Punchiri Travels (Kairali TV)
- 2015 Junior chanakyan (Flowers TV)
- Kunnamkulathangadi (Media One)
- 2016 Bharya (Asianet)
- 2018 Maya (Sun TV) – Tamil
- 2019-2020 Classmates (Flowers TV)
- 20219-2020 Chackoyum Maryyum (Mazhavil Manorama)
- 2020 Koodathayi (Flowers TV)
- 2021-2024 Sundari – Bangle Bangaram (Surya TV) Guest appearance
- 2020-2022 Ente Maathavu (Surya TV)

=== Web series ===
- Instagramam (neestream)
- Vadhandhi: The Fable of Velonie (2022)
