= Sneha Sreekumar =

Indian actress

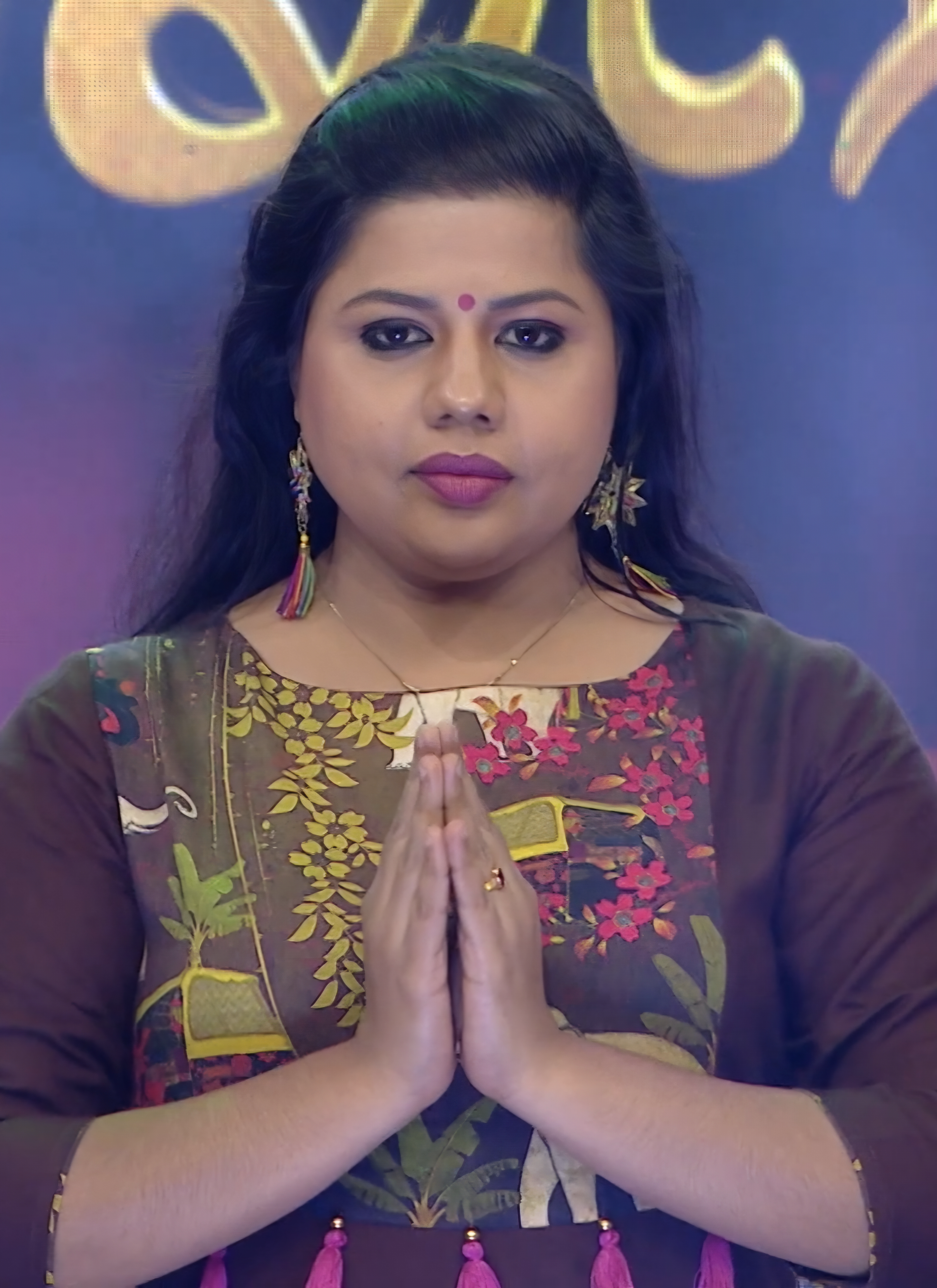
- Sneha in May 2018
- Born: Sneha Sreekumar; Ernakulam, Kerala, India
- Education: Maharaja's College, Ernakulam; Sree Sankaracharya University of Sanskrit, Kalady; Mahatma Gandhi University, Kerala
- Occupations: Actress; Television anchor; Classical dancer
- Years active: 2011 – present
- Spouses: Diljith M. Das (divorced); S. P. Sreekumar (m. 2019)
- Parents: Sreekumar; Girija Devi

Sneha Sreekumar is an Indian actress and dancer who appears in Malayalam films, television serials and dramas. She is best known for playing the character of Mandodari in the TV sitcom Marimayam. She is also a professionally trained dancer with 15 years of experience in dance forms like Mohiniyattam, Kuchipudi, Kathakali, Ottan Thullal, and Bharathanatyam.

== Biography ==
Sneha was born to Sreekumar, who works in the Kerala Water Authority and Girija Devi, who was the principal of a school in Kochi. They are settled in Kumbalam, Ernakulam. She has an elder sister Soumya.

Sneha completed her schooling from St. Antony's Higher Secondary School, Ernakulam and did her graduation in Malayalam from Maharaja's College, Ernakulam. Later, she completed her post-graduation from Sree Sankaracharya University of Sanskrit, Kalady in Theatre arts. She also holds a master of philosophy in the performing arts from Mahatma Gandhi University, Kerala.

She is professionally trained in Kathakali from Kalamandalam E. Vasudevan, Ottan Thullal from Kalamandalam Prabhakaran and Mohiniyattam from Nirmala Panicker.

She started off her career through popular TV series Marimayam playing the role of Mandodari which rose her fame among the Malayali audience. She made her debut with Vallatha Pahayan directed by Niyas Backer and later went on to act in several films and her notable roles include in To Noora with Love, Zachariayude Garbhinikal, Rajamma @ Yahoo, Utopiayile Rajavu, Velipadinte Pusthakam to name a few.

She is also hosted the TV show Loudspeaker.

== Filmography ==
Year	Title	Role	Notes
2013	Vallatha Pahayan	Suhara	Debut
2013	Zachariayude Garbhinikal	Vasundhara	
2014	Color Balloon	Sunitha	
2014	Karanavar	Nandhini	
2014	To Noora with Love	Raziya	
2015	You Can Do It	Fathima	
2015	Nee-Na	Rufiya	
2015	Utopiayile Rajavu	Thankamani	
2015	Rajamma @ Yahoo	Indu	
2015	Ben	Tutor	
2015	Ellam Chettante Ishtam Pole	—N/a	Dubbed for Kozhikode Ramadevi
2016	Marubhoomiyile Aana	Welcome girl	Uncredited role
2016	Ithu Thaanda Police	CPO Tinto Thomas	
2016	Kavi Uddheshichathu..?	Vineetha	
2016	Ore Mukham	Thankam Sasi	
2017	Velipadinte Pusthakam	Anumol	
2017	Thrissivaperoor Kliptham	Pauly's ex-wife	Cameo Appearance
2018	Aravindante Athidhikal	Bindu	
2018	Kadha Paranja Kadha	Stella	
2018	Thanaha	Drunkard's wife	
2019	Lonappante Mamodeesa	Aleyamma	
2019	Shibu	Kalyani's friend from karate class	Cameo appearance
2019	Sakalakalashala	Thriller Santha	
2019	Swarna Malsyangal	Susheela	
2019	Panthu	Rabiya	
2019	Sunilinte Swantham Appoos	Malu	Short film
2020	Krishna The Music of Love	Gopika	Music drama
2020	Mayil		
2020	Love FM	Alice	
2022	Bhoothakalam	Vice Principal	
2024	Panchayath Jetty		

=== Television ===
Year	Title	Role	Channel	Genre	Notes
2010	Kunjiyammakku 5 Makkalane		Amrita TV	TV series	
2011 – Present	Marimayam	Mandodari/ Suhara	Mazhavil Manorama	TV series	
2014	Bhargavi Nilayam Ladies Only	Bhargavi	Media One	TV series	
2014 – 2021	Loudspeaker	Salperu Susheela	Kairali TV	Comedy satire	Shortly replaced Anjana Appukuttan
2016	Aniyan Bava Chettan Bava	Gracy	Media One	TV series	
2016	Aluvayum Mathikariyum	Sundari	Asianet Plus	TV series	Replaced Lakshmi Priya
2016	Thattukadayile Aluvayum Mathikariyum	Sundari	Asianet	Telefilm	
2016	Marithatteem Mayammutteem	Mandodari	Mazhavil Manorama	Telefilm	
2017	Komedy Circus	Advocate	Mazhavil Manorama	Reality show	Special appearance
2017 – 2018	Aliyan vs Aliyan	Jamanthi	Amrita TV	TV series	
2018	Urvashi Theatres	Herself	Asianet	Comedy show	
2018 – 2019	Kalli Walli	Manju	Kairali TV	TV sitcom	
2018 – 2019	Laughing Villa	Various roles	Surya TV	Comedy talk show	
2018 – 2019	Angadipaattu	Divya Prabha	Media One	TV series	
2019	Comedy Nights with Suraj	Various roles	Zee Keralam	Comedy talk show	
2019	Thakarppan Comedy	Various roles	Mazhavil Manorama	Comedy game show	
2019	Ayyappa Saranam	Padmini	Amrita TV	TV series	
2019 – 2020	3 Kutties	Raziya	Amrita TV	TV series	
2020	Funny Nights with Pearle Maaney	Various roles	Zee Keralam	Comedy talk show	
2020	Nellikka	Damayanthi	Kairali TV	TV series	
2021	Red Carpet	Mentor	Amrita TV	Talk show	
2021	Madhuram Shobhanam	Raji	Zee Keralam	Special Show	
2022-2023	Wife is Beautiful	Kumari	Zee Keralam	TV series	

TV Shows as guest/participant

- Ashwamedham
- Comedy Super Nite
- Super Chef
- Smart Show
- JB Junction
- Aanamalayile Aanappan
- Charutha
- Haritham Sundaram
- Onnum Onnum Moonu
- Let's Rock N Roll
- Panam Tharum Padam
- Super Kudumbam

== Theatre ==
- Play Boy
- Marimankanni
- Spinal Cord
- Hayavadana
- Black Friday
- Poovan Pazham
- The Proposal
- Chayamukhi
- Pralaya Sougandhikam
- Taj Mahal
- Krishna (Music drama)
