= Polytechnic (film) =

- Film poster
- Directed by: M. Padmakumar
- Written by: Nishad Koya
- Produced by: Kala Nair
- Starring: Kunchacko Boban; Bhavana; Niyas Backer
- Cinematography: Pramod K. Pillai
- Edited by: Ranjan Abraham
- Music by: Gopi Sundar
- Production company: Mrinalini Gandhi Cinemas
- Distributed by: K N M & Percy Pictures
- Release date: 9 April 2014
- Running time: 150 minutes
- Country: India
- Language: Malayalam

Polytechnic is a 2014 Indian Malayalam comedy film directed by M. Padmakumar and produced by Kala Nair. The film stars Kunchacko Boban and Bhavana in the lead roles. The music of the film was composed by Gopi Sundar. K N M & Percy Pictures distributed the film, it was released on 9 April 2014.

== Plot ==
Pauly belongs to a well off family in a rural village of Kerala. A politician by profession, he does many helpful activities for the benefit of poor people in the village. Sukumaran Nair, a member of the opposition party, tries to disrupt whatever Pauly does. They have been enemies for a very long time. Things become worse when Pauly falls in love with Sukumaran Nair's daughter Aswathy. It is at this circumstance, Pauly's father, an army person is killed in a terrorist attack. Pauly is forced to look after his family. Following the advice of a senior comrade Ganghadaran in the party, Pauly buys a biscuit company in his village with the help of three close friends using compensation money from the government, for the loss of his father. His plan is to convert it into a factory to store processed and dried agricultural products. The inauguration of the factory is disrupted by the Panchayath secretary, stating that the factory does not have the required approvals. Pauly tries to get the required approvals, but nothing works out. Bekkar plays friend tries to get him the approval by paying a man who promised to get them the required approvals. Turns out that the certificates given to them are fake and Pauly gets arrested. When released from jail Pauly rejects an offer to buy the land from him. He bribes all the officers and gets all the required approvals. Pauly and his friends catch a group of goons trying to burn the factory. They capture one of the attackers. They recognize him as the same person who got them in jail by giving them fake certificates. He confesses that the conspirator is Ganghadharan. The panchayath secretary gives the signature so that Pauly does not cause any trouble. During the inauguration of the factory, Pauly plays a video clip of the bribes given to all the officers in front of the minister. The movie ends with the minister congratulating Pauly and his friends.

== Cast ==
- Kunchacko Boban as Pauly
  - Nebish Benson as Young Pauly
- Aju Varghese as Bakkar, Pauly's best friend
  - Gourav Menon as Young Bakkar
- Bhavana as SI Aswathi Nair, Pauly's love interest
  - Nandana Varma as Young Ashwathi
- Vijayaraghavan as Sukumaran Nair, Aswathi's father and Pauly's arch enemy
- Kochu Preman as Kannan, Sukumaran's aide
- Kalabhavan Narayanankutty
- Suraj Venjaramoodu as Sakhav Babu, local leader
- Niyas Backer as Murugan
- Zahid Sinan
- Devi Chandana
- Sunil Sukhada as Panicker, the local astrologer
- Mamukkoya as Habeeb, Bakkar's father and a local tea vendor
- Ambika as Mary, Pauly's mother
- Anil Murali as Ganeshan, Police officer
- Ponnamma Babu as Lathika, health department officer
- Sasi Kalinga as Kannan, officer
- Edavela Babu as Clement, Poly's uncle
- Thesni Khan as panchayath secretary
- Hareesh Peradi as Sakhav Gangadharan, local leader
- Guinness Pakru as Biju
- Dr Rony David as Pauly and Bakkar's childhood friend
- Innocent as Chandrakumar, minister

== Soundtrack ==
The music was composed by Gopi Sundar, with lyrics written by Rajeev Nair.

No.	Song	Singers	Lyrics	Length (m:ss)
1	"Appakkalle"	Franco, Gopi Sundar	Rajeev Nair	
2	"Assalumundiriye"	Vineeth Sreenivasan	Rajeev Nair	
