= Salim Hassan =

Indian television and film actor

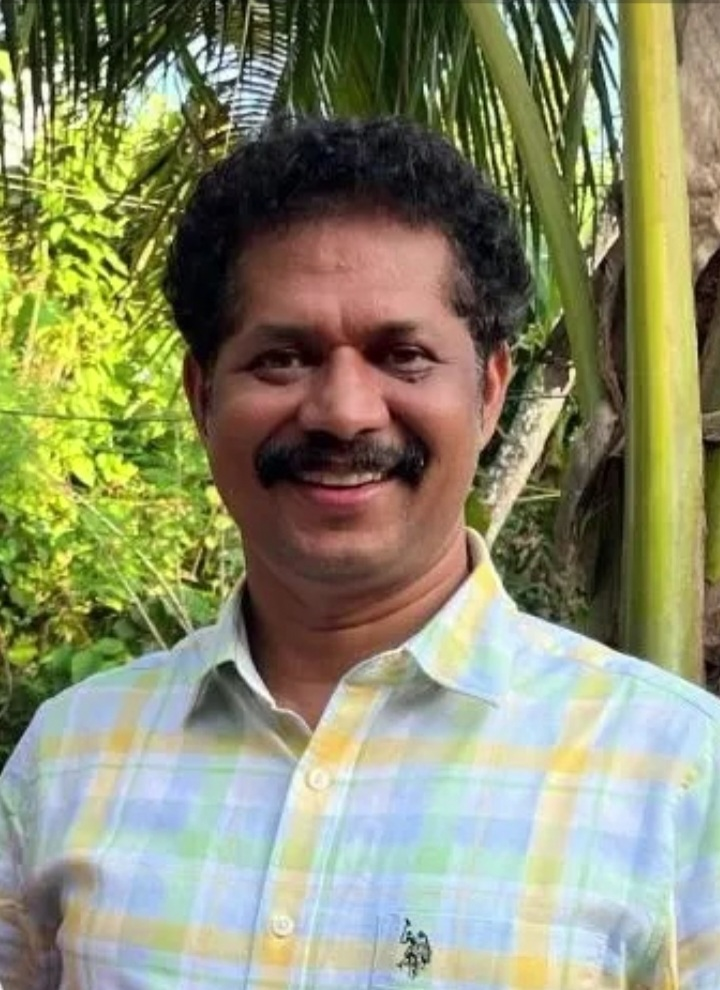
- Salim in 2024
- Born: Salim Hassan; Mulavukad, Kochi
- Education: Mahatma Gandhi University, Kerala
- Occupations: Actor; director; screenwriter
- Years active: 2011 – present
- Known for: Pyarijathan in Marimayam
- Television: Marimayam
- Spouse: Babitha Salim
- Children: 2

Salim Hassan is an actor who appears in the Malayalam television and film industry. He is best known for his role as Pyarijathan or Pyari in the television sitcom, Marimayam, on Mazhavil Manorama. He had also appeared in Malayalam films, including Mera Naam Shaji (2019) and Makal (2022).

== Biography ==
Salim Hassan is a native of Mulavukad island located in Kochi, Kerala. His father Hassan was a small-scale business man while his mother, Khadeeja was a house wife. He has an elder brother. His father had been involved in stage play which led him to be active in mimicry during his school days. He married his wife Babitha in 2006 and has two daughters.

== Career ==
He marked his entry into mini screen through the family reality show, Veruthe Alla Bharya aired on Mazhavil Manorama, which he secured third position. He played the role of Pyarijathan in Marimayam, a sitcom aired on the same channel. Marimayam is the only Malayalam television show to win the 'Best Comedy Show' award at Kerala State Television Awards for five consecutive years in a row starting from 2015. Salim Hassan won the Special Jury Award in 2020. His directorial debut along with Manikandan Pattambi, the film Panchayath Jetty starring the Marimayam regular cast is awaiting theaterical release on 26 July 2024.

== Filmography ==
=== Films ===
Year	Title	Role	Notes
2019	Mera Naam Shaji		
2022	Makal		
2023	Pachappu Thedi		
2023	3 Days		
2024	Panchayath Jetty	O.K Haridas	Also Co-Director
2024	Adios Amigo		
2024	Bharathanatyam	Henry Samuel	
2026	Bharathanatyam 2 Mohiniyattam	Henry Samuel	

=== Television ===
Year	Title	Role	Channel	Genre	Notes
2011 – Present	Marimayam	Pyarijathan	Mazhavil Manorama	TV series	
