= Panchayath Jetty =

2024 Indian Malayalam comedy film

- Theatrical release poster
- Directed by: Manikandan Pattambi; Salim Hassan
- Written by: Manikandan Pattambi; Salim Hassan
- Produced by: Balan K. Mangat; Prem Pepko
- Starring: Salim Hassan; Salim Kumar; Manikandan Pattambi; Rachana Narayanankutty; Kulappulli Leela
- Cinematography: Krish Kymal
- Edited by: Shyam Sasidharan
- Music by: Ranjin Raj
- Production companies: Saptha Tharang Creations; Govind Films
- Release date: 26 July 2024
- Running time: 139 minutes
- Country: India
- Language: Malayalam
- Budget: ₹3 crore

Panchayath Jetty is a 2024 Indian Malayalam-language comedy film written and directed by Manikandan Pattambi and Salim Hassan and is produced by Saptha Tharang Creations in association with Govind Films. Along with the regular cast of the television sitcom Marimayam which includes the director duo, Rachana Narayanankutty, Sneha Sreekumar and Vinod Kovoor, it also stars Salim Kumar, Kulappulli Leela and Pauly Valsan.

The film was released on 26 July 2024. The film bombed at the box office.

== Plot ==
The story takes place in the backwaters imaginary village of "Kudungassery", where problems include insufficient public transport and inadequate cremation services to which people started protesting against panchayath authorities. As local elections draw near, opposition chief Vallabhan (Manikandan Pattambi) capitalises on these matters to challenge ruling party head OK Chandradas (Salim Hassan). The story tracks Chandradas as he works to address these challenges and maintain his political position.

The film explores themes of rural development and infrastructure challenges, humour in everyday life, political satire, personal vs public interests, and more.

== Cast ==
- Salim Hassan as O.K Chandradas
- Rachana Narayanankutty as Ala
- Manikandan Pattambi as Vallabhan
- Sanuja Somanath
- Salim Kumar as MLA Radha Ramanan
- Vinod Kovoor as CPO Appu
- Sneha Sreekumar as Prema
- Unni Cheruvathoor as Maniyan
- Riyas Narmakala as Bank Manager
- Veena Nair as Vimala
- Niyas Backer as Aliyan
- Arun Punalur as Dasan
- Reshmi Anil as wife of Maniyan
- Mani Shornur as Kudiyan
- Raghavan as Farmer Raghavan
- Manohari Joy
- James Elia
- Pauly Valsan
- Kulappulli Leela
- Sethu Lakshmi

== Filming ==
Filming for Panchayath Jetty started in December 2023, following a launch event in Kochi. Cherai has served as the backdrop for filming.

== Music ==
The film's music is composed by Ranjin Raj and the lyrics written by Santosh Verma and BK Harinarayanan.

=== Track listing ===
No.	Title	Lyrics	Music	Singer(s)	Length
1.	"Ullam Kayyilaaro"	BK Harinarayanan	Ranjin Raj	Madhu Balakrishnan	3:47
Total length:					3:47

== Release ==
The film was theatrically released on 26 July 2024.
