= Oru Visheshapetta Biriyani Kissa =

- Theatrical release poster
- Directed by: Kiran Narayanan
- Written by: Kiran Narayanan
- Produced by: WL Epic Media
- Starring: Lena; Nedumudi Venu; Joju George
- Cinematography: Sunil Kaimanam
- Edited by: Ayoob Khan
- Music by: Songs: Sanjeev Kirhsnan; G. K. Rao; Score: Bijibal
- Release date: August 25, 2017 (India)
- Running time: 126 minutes
- Country: India
- Language: Malayalam

Oru Visheshapetta Biriyani Kissa is a 2017 Indian Malayalam-language fantasy comedy film written and directed by Kiran Narayan. It stars Lena, Joju George, Nedumudi Venu, Mamukkoya, V. K. Sreeraman, and Sunil Sukhada. The film was released on 25 August 2017.

== Plot ==
Thaara lives a quiet life in a fictional village in Kerala, a village which is famous for a mosque and the mosque's free weekly biriyani meal. The free meal is offered by Sahib, the village head. Though it is a Muslim mosque and a Muslim does this offering, the entire village, regardless of religion and caste, takes part in it. The biriyani served is famous for its taste and the free meal program acts as a societal bonding in the entire village. Unexpectedly the chef who cooks the biriyani passes away and the entire free meal program comes to a standstill. Thaara, who had recently become a widow, is a good cook as she was once blessed by the divine being himself and had won many cooking contests in her past. The story then turns to heaven were the superior angel tells his junior that when Thaara was 19 months old baby she was crying and the angel gave her the skill of cooking. This is why her food has the taste of heaven. Villagers are unaware of Thaara's culinary skills and the blessings that she got. She volunteers and requests the Sahib to give her a chance to cook biriyani. Some of the villagers object this as they do not see Thaara as a good soul. Thaara is untouched by the recent death of her husband. The Sahib, though reluctant, agrees to Thaara's request.

On Thaara's first day, a news rock the village. Thaara was pregnant and has delivered a child. The biriyani feast comes to a halt after Thaara gets pregnant. The villagers meet in the presence of Sahib. One of the villagers recommends a famous chef, an outsider to the village. The recommendation is accepted, and the new chef is appointed. But the new chef and the villager who recommended him has an ulterior motive is to steal the valuable stalk which is in the mosque. This takes the film to its climax. The story concludes by revealing Thaara's romantic life, the fatherhood of her child, the hardships she had to face and whether she and her biriyani will get accepted by the villagers or not.

The film starts and ends with a narration by one of the famous chefs in Kerala, thus implying that it was just a story narrated for an FM Radio programme.

== Cast ==
- Lena as Thaara
- Nedumudi Venu as Krishnan Nair
- Mamukkoya as Alavikutti
- V. K. Sreeraman as Mayin Hajiyar
- Sunil Sukhada as Mathayi
- Joju George as Maimutty
- Bhagath Manuel as Paul Mathayi
- Sasi Kalinga as Rajan Mangatteri
- Vinod Kovoor as Sulaiman
- Pradeep Kottayam as Mathew
- Surabhi Lakshmi as Amina
- Noby Marcose as Kunji Mrukan
- Appunni Sasi as Hassan
- Vinay Forrt as Superior Angel (Cameo appearance)
- Aju Varghese as Junior Angel (Cameo appearance)
- Lal as Abu Musaliyar Mowlavi (Cameo appearance)
- Bhavana as Kumari Kamalambika (Cameo appearance)

== Soundtrack ==
The film's score and soundtrack were composed by Sanjeev Krishna and GK Rao. Song lyrics were written by Suku Maruthathoor and Aji Deivappura.

| No. | Title | Lyrics | Singer(s) | Length |
|---|---|---|---|---|
| 1. | "Payye Payye" | Suku Maruthathoor | Vijay Yesudas | 4:30 |
| 2. | "Mulankaadu Poothu" | GK Rao | Reshmi I V | 04:27 |
| 3. | "Nila Nilamazhaye" | Aji Deivappura | Manjari | 04:21 |
| Total length: | | | | 13:18 |
