= Kerala Government Polytechnic College =

Kerala Government Polytechnic College, Kozhikode
- KGPTC
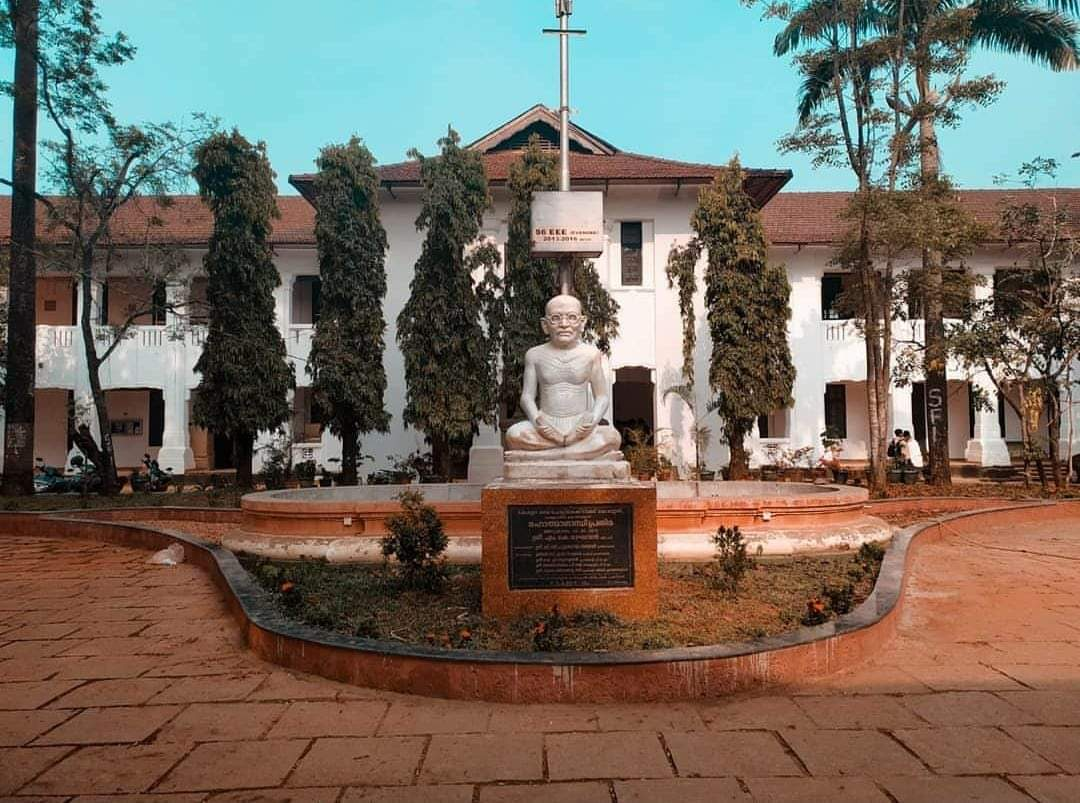
- Motto: Labour is Dignity
- Type: Government Polytechnic College
- Affiliations: AICTE
- Location: Kozhikode, Kerala, India
- Nickname: KGPTC
- Website: www.kgptc.in

Kerala Government Polytechnic College is located at West Hill, 5 km away from Kozhikode city on the roadside of Kozhikode Kannur N.H.17 Road. A place near Industrial Estate, Westhill. The institution was started as Industrial School and later upgraded as Kerala Polytechnic and later renamed as Kerala Govt. Polytechnic College, Kozhikode. The institution is now under the control of Directorate of Technical Education formed by the Government of Kerala

== About ==
The Kerala Govt Polytechnic College, Westhill was established in 1946, one of the oldest polytechnic colleges in Kerala. The college was inaugurated by Sri. V V Giri, bar-at-law, minister for industries and labour, Government of Madras on 23 November 1946. Sri. Sreenivas Rao was the first principal. Over time, the intake of students increased; six full-fledged departments currently offer six engineering diploma programmes such as Civil Engineering, Computer Engineering, Chemical Engineering, Mechanical Engineering, Electrical & Electronics Engineering, Tool & Die Engineering under the Department of Technical Education, Kerala. The college has approximately 1200 students, 90 teaching staff and 28 non-teaching staff.

== History ==
KGPTC was established in 1946 as Kerala Polytechnic under the Madras Government. The school originally offered 4 diploma standard courses and five certificate standard courses.

The diploma courses were Civil engineering, Mechanical engineering, Electrical engineering and Chemical engineering.

== Notable alumni ==
- Sasi Kalinga, Actor, Malayalam film industry
- Vidya Balakrishnan, Member of Kerala Legislative Assembly

== Other Programmes ==
List of other schemes/activities implemented

- Community Development through Polytechnics
- Industry Institute Partnership Cell
- Visiting Faculty Scheme
- Finishing School
- D Skill Course for Disabled
- Continuing Education Cell

== Departments ==
- Civil Engineering
- Mechanical Engineering
- Electrical & Electronics Engineering
- Chemical Engineering
- Computer Engineering
- Tool & Die Engineering
