= Njan Samvidhanam Cheyyum =

- Theatrical Poster
- Directed by: Balachandra Menon
- Screenplay by: Balachandra Menon
- Produced by: K. P. R. Nair
- Starring: Madhu; Balachandra Menon; Sreedhanya; Dakshina; Shankar; Menaka; Raveendran; Sreekanth Sasikanth
- Cinematography: Jemin Jom Ayyaneth
- Edited by: Pradeep Shankar
- Music by: Balachandra Menon
- Production companies: V&V Productions
- Release date: 19 September 2015
- Running time: 161 minutes
- Country: India
- Language: Malayalam

Njan Samvidhanam Cheyyum (transl. I Will Direct) is a 2015 Indian Malayalam-language family drama film written, directed, and produced by Balachandra Menon. It stars Menon in the lead role, along with Sreedhanya, Dakshina, Shankar, Menaka, Ravindran, and Madhu in supporting roles. The film was released on 19 September 2015 in India to negative critical response.

The film's story revolves around Krishna Das (Balachandra Menon), a middle-aged man who resigns from the National Film Development Corporation to become a director.

== Cast ==
- Madhu
- Balachandra Menon as Krishna Das
- Sreedhanya (credited as Gayathri) as Gayathri Devi
- Dakshina
- Sreekanth Sasikanth
- Shankar
- Menaka
- Raveendran
- Vineeth
- Sunil Sukhada
- Sudheer Karamana
- Sasi Kalinga
- Kalabhavan Shajohn
- Sreelatha Namboothiri
- Renji Panicker
- G. Suresh Kumar
- Bhagyalakshmi
- P. Sreekumar
- Dharmajan Bolgatty
- Viji Thampi
- Tessa Joseph
- Ramkumar Uppatt
- Anoop Krishnan as Shyam

== Critical reception ==
Sanjith Sidhardhan of The Times of India rated the film 2/5 and said, "Balachandra Menon's comeback movie follows a familiar plot that is riddled with cliches." He concluded the review saying, "Films with familiar themes had tasted success in recent times thanks to the way they were presented and that's where Njan Samvidhanam Cheyyum falls short. The frames are lifeless and sometimes repetitive. The movie could have been a bit crisper and less tedious with some tight editing." Sify.com wrote that the film is a torture asking "How can someone (the producer) spend so much money for this kind of stupidity?
