= Manikyakkallu =

- Manikyakkallu promotional poster
- Directed by: M. Mohanan
- Written by: M. Mohanan
- Produced by: A. S. Gireesh Lal
- Starring: Prithviraj Sukumaran; Samvrutha Sunil; Nedumudi Venu; Salim Kumar; Jagadish
- Cinematography: P. Sukumar
- Edited by: Ranjan Abraham
- Music by: M. Jayachandran
- Release date: 5 May 2011
- Country: India
- Language: Malayalam
- Budget: ₹2 crore (US$210,000)
- Box office: ₹11.25 crore (US$1.2 million)

Manikyakkallu is a 2011 Indian Malayalam-language drama film written and directed by M. Mohanan and starring Prithviraj Sukumaran, Samvrutha Sunil, Nedumudi Venu and Salim Kumar in the lead roles. It is about a young teacher who arrives at a village school and tries to make a definite change in students' attitudes. The movie is loosely based on the life story of the students and teachers of the Government Brennen Higher Secondary School, Thalassery.

== Cast ==
- Prithviraj Sukumaran as Vinayachandran Master
- Samvrutha Sunil as Chandni Teacher
- Nedumudi Venu as Kurup Mash, head master
- Salim Kumar as Kunjiraman/Thamburan
- Jagathy Sreekumar as Karunakaran Karinkalkuzhi
- Devan as Ramachandran Master, Vinayachandran's father
- Indrans as Sudhakaran
- Sai Kumar as District Education Officer Prakashan Nair
- Kottayam Nazeer as Pavanan Parimanam (Pavanan Master)
- Jagadish as Vasudevan Cheruvancherry a.k.a. V.D.C
- Manikandan Pattambi as Gopalan
- Anoop Chandran as Ahammed Master
- Sasi Kalinga as Sashi
- P. Sreekumar as Education Minister Paliyam Surendran
- Anil Murali as Sreedharan Master a.k.a. S. K
- Manuraj as Satheeshan
- Narayanankutty as Eldhose, Panchayath President
- Navneeth Madhavan as Manu
- K. P. A. C. Lalitha as Vilasini, Chandini's mother
- Bindu Panicker as Rakhi, Kurup's wife
- Shaalin Zoya as Mubeena
- Ambika Mohan as Savithri teacher, Vinayachandran's mother
- Joby as Kunjachan
- Kochu Preman as Varghese
- Muthumani as Sundari Teacher
- K. T. C. Abdulla as Mathi Mammad, Basheer's father
- Kalabhavan Haneef as Radhakrishnan
- Balu Varghese as Basheer
- Anil Panachooran as Uthaman
- Suresh Krishna as CI Ramesh extended Cameo Appearance
- Aju Varghese - Cameo Appearance
- Subeesh Sudhi - Cameo Appearance
- Kulappulli Leela- Cameo Appearance
- M. Jayachandran- as Himself (Cameo Appearance)
- Vishnu Unnikrishnan- Cameo Appearance
- Dhanapriya - Dhanya, Vinayachandran's student

== Soundtrack ==
All lyrics are written by Anil Panachooran and Ramesh Kavil except where noted; all music is composed by M. Jayachandran.

No.	Title	Lyrics	Artist(s)	Length
1.	"Chembarathi"		Shreya Ghoshal, Ravisankar
2.	"Melemanathe"	Ramesh Kavil	V. Devanand
3.	"Olakkuda"		Madhu Balakrishnan
4.	"Naadaayal"		Sherdin
