= Raja Marthanda =

Indian Kannada-language action film

- Directed by: K. Ram Narayan
- Written by: K. Ram Narayan
- Produced by: Shivakumar Nagaraj; Divya N
- Starring: Chiranjeevi Sarja; Deepti Sati
- Cinematography: Bushan N
- Edited by: Venkatesh UDV
- Music by: Arjun Janya
- Release date: 6 October 2023
- Running time: 135 minutes
- Country: India
- Language: Kannada

Raja Marthanda is a 2023 Indian Kannada-language film directed by K. Ram Narayan. The film stars Chiranjeevi Sarja (in his final role) and Deepti Sati in the lead roles.

Rajamarthanda was released on 6 October 2023 to mixed reviews from critics.

== Cast ==
- Chiranjeevi Sarja as Raja
- Deepti Sati as Geetha
- Meghashree
- Saurav Lokesh
- Chikkanna
- Anand
- Devaraj as Raja's father
- Sumithra as Raja's grandmother

== Production ==
Chiranjeevi Sarja, died on 7 June 2020, at the age of 39. He had completed filming for the film prior to his death, and his younger brother, Dhruva Sarja, dubbed for his brother.

== Music ==
The songs and background score are composed by Arjun Janya.

== Reception ==
=== Critical response ===
A critic from The Times of India gave 2.5 out of 5 stars and wrote "Although the split personality disorder prelude seems interesting, the fact that it turns into another regular revenge drama is probably what kills the curiosity among audiences".
