= Vallatha Pahayan =

- Directed by: Niyas Backer, Razaq Muhammed
- Produced by: Milan Jaleel
- Starring: Manikandan Pattambi; Rachana Narayanankutty
- Cinematography: Utpal V Nayanar
- Music by: Bijibal
- Production company: Galaxy Films
- Distributed by: Galaxy Films
- Release date: 17 May 2013 (India)
- Running time: 110 minutes
- Country: India
- Language: Malayalam

Vallatha Pahayan (Malayalam : വല്ലാത്ത പഹയൻ) is a 2013 Indian Malayalam Drama movie, directed by Niyas Backer produced by Milan Jaleel under his banner Galaxy Films. The film stars Manikandan Pattambi, Rachana Narayanankutty in the lead roles along with a supporting cast of Mamukkoya, Mala Aravindan, Kulappulli Leela, Kochu Preman, and K. P. A. C. Lalitha.

== Cast ==
- Manikandan Pattambi as Balachandran/Himavaan
- Rachana Narayanankutty as Sumithra, Balachandran's wife
- Vinod Kovoor as Shukkur
- Sneha Sreekumar as Suhara, Shukkur's wife/ prahalathan's love interest
- S. P. Sreekumar as Prahlathan, Suhara's love interest
- Janardhanan as Balan's father
- K. P. A. C. Lalitha as Balan's mother
- Mamukkoya as Seydhali
- Mala Aravindan
- Kulappulli Leela as Naniyamma
- Kochu Preman as Nambiar, the school headmaster
- Jaffar Idukki as Ashraf
- Sasi Kalinga as Thankappan Shanghai
- Sunil Sukhada as Porinju, the money lender
- Kottayam Nazeer
- Irshad
- Roslin as Seydhali's wife
- Niyas Backer as Kuruvilla, the school teacher
- Mani Shornur as Rameshan, the tea shop owner
- Salim Hassan

== Music ==
- "Daivame Nirayunnu"
- "Daivame Nirayunnu" (Karaoke)
- "Kannamthalir Poovu" (Duet)
- "Kannamthalir Poovu" (F)
- "Kannamthalir Poovu" (Karaoke)
- "Kannamthalir Poovu" (M)
- "Ramanamkili"
- "Ramanamkili" (Karaoke)
