= Niyas Backer =

Indian actor and comedian

- Occupations: Actor, mimicry artist, film director
- Years active: 1990–present
- Known for: Marimayam
- Relatives: Kalabhavan Navas (brother)

Niyas Backer is an Indian actor, mimicry artist, and occasional film director who works primarily in the Malayalam film and television industry. He is best known for his portrayal of the character Koya in the long-running Malayalam television sitcom Marimayam. Over the years, he has appeared in a wide range of Malayalam films, mainly in supporting and character roles, and has also directed a feature film.

== Early and personal life ==
Backer hails from Vadakkancherry in Thrissur district, Kerala. He is the eldest son of Aboobacker, a theatre artist and actor, and the elder brother of the late Malayalam actor and mimicry artist Kalabhavan Navas, who died in August 2025.

In 2025, Backer publicly refused a viral social media claim that his late brother's family had received a ₹26 lakh insurance payout, stating the posted insurance card was fake and warning the public against spreading misinformation.

== Career ==
Backer began his career as a mimicry artist and stage performer, participating in comedy shows and theatre programmes across Kerala. He gradually transitioned to cinema, establishing himself as a dependable character actor in Malayalam films.

Alongside film appearances, he gained widespread popularity on television through his role as Koya in Marimayam, a satirical sitcom broadcast on Mazhavil Manorama since 2011. His performance in the series earned him recognition among television audiences.

In 2013, Niyas made his directorial debut with the Malayalam film Vallatha Pahayan, in which he also acted. The film marked his entry into filmmaking beyond acting. In 2014, he played the lead role in the film Manja, portraying the central character.

== Filmography ==
=== Films ===
Year	Film	Role	Notes
1993	Venkalam	—	
1993	Chamayam	—	
1997	Kudamattam	—	
2001	Ishtam	Babukuttan	
2003	Gramophone	Lalappan	
2007	Speed Track	Tinu’s friend	
2012	Jawan of Vellimala	Shibu	
2012	Spanish Masala	Abdu	Mimicry artist
2012	Ordinary	KPAC Chandran	
2012	Run Baby Run	—	
2013	3 Dots	Manoharan	
2013	Vallatha Pahayan	Kuruvilla	Director and actor
2014	Polytechnic	Murugan	
2014	Manja	Jackson	Lead role
2014	Mannar Mathai Speaking 2	Cook Manjulan	
2017	Fukri	Vasantha Kumar	
2018	Queen	Head of Mechanical Dept.	
2019	Oru Adaar Love	Gadha’s father	
2019	Porinju Mariam Jose	Varkey	
2019	Lonappante Mamodeesa	Simon	
2019	Munthiri Monchan	Aniyachan	
2019	Mask		
2024	Panchayath Jetty	Aliyan	
2024	Vivekanandan Viralanu	Jayan	Civil Police Officer
2025	Pravinkoodu Shappu	Ceylon Ramakrishnan	
2025	Sarvam Maya	Client	
