= Rachana Narayanankutty =

Indian actress and classical dancer

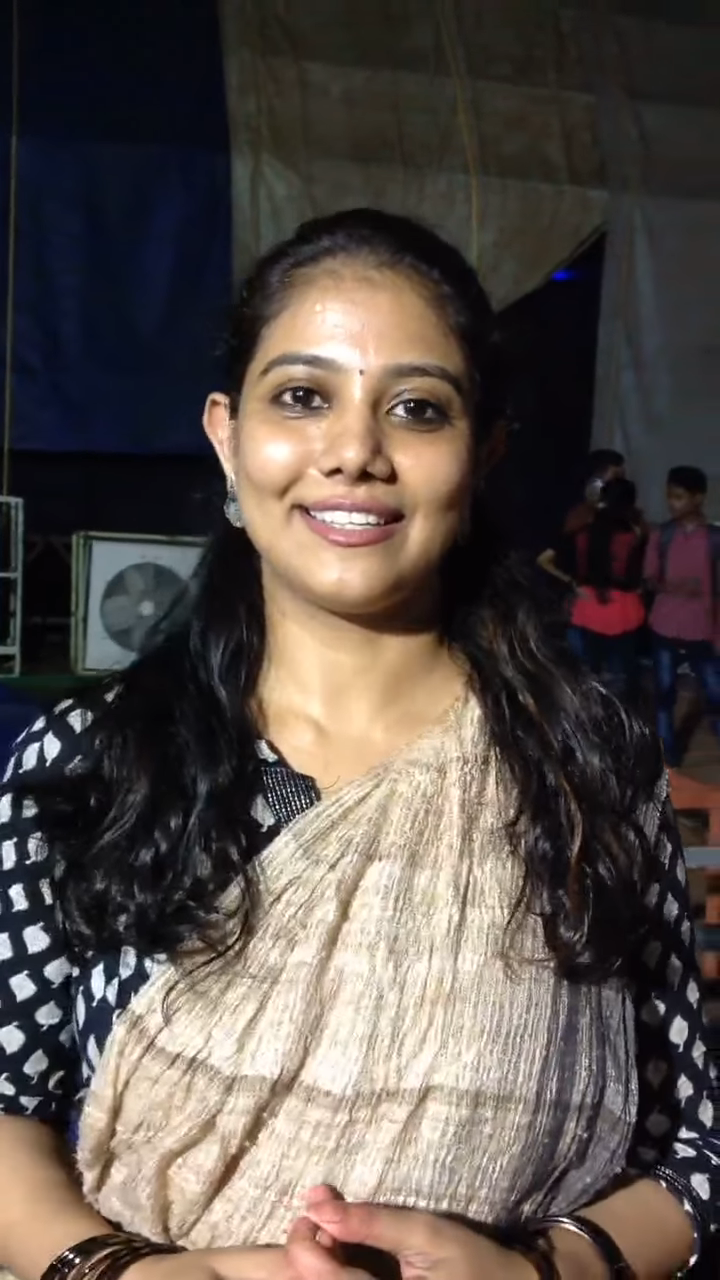
- Born: Thrissur, Kerala, India
- Education: Sri Vyasa NSS College, Wadakkancherry
- Occupations: Actor; Kuchipudi dancer; Television presenter
- Years active: 2001–2003; 2011–present
- Spouse: Arun Sadasivan (m. 2011; div. 2012)
- Parents: Narayanankutty; Narayani

Rachana Narayanankutty is an Indian actress, Kuchipudi dancer, and television presenter who works prominently in Malayalam film and television. She became popular through the television series Marimayam aired in Mazhavil Manorama.

== Personal life ==
Rachana was born in Thrissur to Narayanankutty and Narayani. She is the youngest and has a brother. Rachana completed her schooling from Government Girls High School, Wadakkancherry in 2005, and she completed her graduation from Sri Vyasa NSS College, Wadakkancherry. She was a Communicative English teacher in Devamatha, CBSE school situated in Thrissur district. She took dance classes before she was cast into the television series.

Rachana married Arun Sadasivan in 2011. It was purely an arranged marriage and they had issues. As per Rachana, Arun has started abusing her mentally and physically, which caused her to leave her husband's house after 19 days of marriage.

== Film career ==
She began her career in 2001 by acting in a small role as the heroine's friend in the film Theerthadanam. After her studies, she joined radio as an RJ, at Radio Mango, Thrissur, where a producer spotted her and cast her in Marimayam. She hosted a comedy show Comedy Festival in Mazhavil Manorama. She has also acted in few advertisements and served as judge in the reality show Comedy Express on Asianet. She participated in the reality show Star Challenge on Flowers TV.

She has featured in short films also like ICU, Through Her Eyes, Inverse, Vazhuthana, Moonamidam etc.

== Filmography ==
=== As an actress ===
Year	Title	Role	Notes
2001	Theerthadanam	Vinodini's friend	supporting role
2002	Nizhalkkuthu	Maid	
2013	Lucky Star	Janaki	Her first female lead role
2013	Amen	Clara	
2013	Vallatha Pahayan	Sumitra	
2013	101 Chodyangal	Deepa Radhakrishnan	
2013	Punyalan Agarbattis	Adv. Sai	
2014	One Day Jokes	Unnamed	Silent movie
2015	You Too Brutus	Aparna	
2015	Ain	Saira Banu	
2015	Thinkal Muthal Velli Vare	Arundathi/Jalaja	
2015	Thilothama	Rosy	
2015	Kanthari	Rani	
2015	Double Barrel	Kochumary	
2015	Life of Josutty	Jessy	
2015	Priyamanasam	Queen	Sanskrit movie
2016	Puthiya Niyamam	Kani	
2017	Kambhoji	Ammini	
2017	Varnyathil Aashanka	Keerthana	
2017	Thrissivaperoor Kliptham	Crazy lady	
2019	Mohabbathin Kunjabdulla	Rajani	
2021	Black Coffee	Gayathri	
2021	Thimiram	Anisha	
2022	Aaraattu	Rugmini	
2022	Subha Dinam	Aharya	
2024	Panchayath Jetty	Ala	
2024	Paalum Pazhavum	Revathi	

=== As voice actor ===
Year	Title	Dubbed For	Character	Notes	Ref.
2023	Alone	Herself	Sreedevi, Neighbour	voice only	

== Television ==
Year	Title	Role	Channel	Notes
2011-2013, 2015	Marimayam	Valsala Madam	Mazhavil Manorama	comedy serial
2012	Comedy festival season 1	Host	Mazhavil Manorama	comedy reality show
2014	Lunars Comedy Express	Judge	Asianet Plus	comedy reality show
2015-2016	Comedy Stars Season 2	Judge	Asianet	comedy reality show
2016	Run Baby Run (TV series)	Host	Asianet Plus	kids show Replaced Thesni Khan
2016	Comedy Super Night 2	Host	Flowers TV	comedy Talk show Replaced Vinay Forrt later replaced by Ansiba Hassan
2016	Raveendra Sangeetha Sandhya	Host/Dancer	Mazhavil Manorama	
2016	Ambum Villum	Vilasini	Asianet	Telefilm
2016	Aluvayum Mathikuriyum	Herself	Mazhavil Manorama	Cameo in promo
2017	Music Mojo	Singer	Kappa TV	
2018	Sthree Sakthi	Host	Asianet News	
2018	Lalitham 50	Dancer	Mazhavil Manorama	
2019	Sunday Funday	Host	Amrita TV	
2020	Lalonam Nallonam	Various roles	Asianet	Onam Special show
2020	Comedy Stars Season 2	Judge	Asianet	comedy reality show
2021	Let's Rock And Roll	Mentor	Zee Keralam	Game Show
2021	Comedy Utsavam	Host	Flowers TV	comedy Talk show
2022	Super Kudumbam	Mentor	Mazhavil Manorama	
2023	Bhavana	Herself	Surya TV	TV Serial; Guest appearance
2023	Comedy Masters	Judge	Amrita TV	
2023	Red Carpet	Mentor	Amrita TV	
2024–	Funs Upon A Time 4.0	Judge	Amrita TV	
