= Thinkal Muthal Velli Vare =

- Official poster
- Directed by: Kannan Thamarakkulam
- Written by: Dinesh Pallath
- Produced by: Anto Joseph
- Starring: Jayaram; Rimi Tomy; Anoop Menon; Rachana Narayanankutty
- Cinematography: Pradeep Nair
- Edited by: V. T. Sreejith
- Music by: Saanand George Grace
- Production company: Anto Joseph Film Company
- Distributed by: Anto Joseph Film Company
- Release date: 12 June 2015 (India)
- Running time: 138 minutes
- Country: India
- Language: Malayalam

Thinkal Muthal Velli Vare (transl. Monday to Friday) is a 2015 Indian Malayalam-language comedy film, produced by Anto Joseph and directed by Kannan Thamarakkulam. The film stars Jayaram in the lead role with, Anoop Menon, singer Rimi Tomy (in her lead debut), Rachana Narayanankutty, Sasi Kalinga, Maniyanpilla Raju, Rachana Narayanankutty, Edavela Babu, K. P. A. C. Lalitha, and K. B. Ganesh Kumar in supporting roles. The film turned out to be a box-office bomb.

== Synopsis ==
Scriptwriter Jayadevan Chunkathara marries the village girl Pushpavalli, who is a diehard fan of his serials. Their married life results in a number of humorous incidents for both of them.

== Cast ==
- Jayaram as Jayadevan Chungathara
- Anoop Menon as Vijaya Anand
- Janardhanan as Rtd. Col. Viswanatha Menon
- Rimi Tomy as Pushpavalli
- Rachana Narayanankutty as Arundhathi / Jalaja
- K. B. Ganesh Kumar as Sabari
- Idavela Babu as Ramesh
- Anoop Chandran as Suresh
- Sasi Kalinga as Black Magician
- Saju Navodaya as Jayadevan's Helper
- Maniyanpilla Raju as C. I. Dhanapalan
- Geetha Salam as Pushpavalli's Uncle
- K.P.A.C. Lalitha as Jayadevan's Grandmother
- Viji Chandrasekhar as Jayadevan's mother
- Muthumani as Vanaja
- Ambika Mohan as Pushapavalli's Aunt
- Aiswarya Rajeev as Shobha
- Anu as Pushpavalli's friend
- Bindu Aneesh as Rohini
- Sangeetha Shivan as Host
- Spadikam George

Cameos

- Aliyar as himself
- Amith as himself
- Boban Samuel as himself
- Deepan as himself
- G. K. Pillai as himself
- Jayakumar Pillai as himself
- Kishore as himself
- Sajan Surya as himself
- Kochaniyan as himself
- Kollam Shah as himself
- Kottayam Pradeep as himself
- Manoj Pillai as himself
- Poojappura Radhakrishnan as himself
- Rajasenan as himself
- Thulasidas as himself
- Vanchiyoor Praveen Kumar as himself
- Vivek Gopan as himself
- Anila Sreekumar as herself
- Aparna P Nair as herself
- Archana Suseelan as herself
- Beena Antony as herself
- Charutha Baiju as herself
- Chithra Shenoy as herself
- Dimple Rose as herself
- Gayathri as herself
- Indulekha as herself
- Jija Surendran as herself
- Kanya Bharathi as herself
- Kavitha Lakshmi as herself
- Kezia Joseph as herself
- Leena Nair as herself
- Lakshmi Priya as herself
- Meera Muralidharan as herself
- Nisha Sarang as herself
- Prabha as herself
- Pratheeksha G Pradeep as herself
- Priyanka Anoop as herself
- Ramyasree as herself
- Sangeetha Mohan as herself
- Souparnika as herself
- Sreedevi Anil as herself
- Sreekala Sasidharan as herself
- Sumi Santhosh as herself
- Sunitha as herself
- Surya Mohan as herself
- TT Usha as herself
- Yamuna Mahesh as herself

== Music ==
All songs were composed by Sanand George.

| No. | Song | Artist(s) | Length |
|---|---|---|---|
| 1 | "Nataya Natinu" | Vaikom Vijayalakshmi | 02:01 |
| 2 | "Chakkinu Vechathu" | Afsal, Vaikom Vijayalakshmi | 03:24 |
| 3 | "Arundhathy" | Rimy Tomy, Akhil | 02:28 |

== Release ==
The film was not released at the Ganam Theatre in Valarkavu, Thrissur.
