= Nee-Na =

- Theatrical Poster
- Directed by: Lal Jose
- Written by: R. Venugopal
- Produced by: Lal Jose
- Starring: Deepti Sati; Vijay Babu; Ann Augustine
- Cinematography: Jomon T. John
- Edited by: Ranjan Abraham
- Music by: Songs: Nikhil J. Menon; Background Score: Bijibal
- Production company: LJ Films
- Distributed by: LJ Films
- Release date: 15 May 2015
- Running time: 147 minutes
- Country: India
- Language: Malayalam

Nee-Na is a 2015 Indian Malayalam-language drama film directed and produced by Lal Jose. The title Nee-Na is an abbreviation of the central characters Neena and Nalini, played by Deepti Sati and Ann Augustine respectively and it also stars Vijay Babu as male lead. The music label was Muzik247.

Nee-Na released on 15 May and received mostly mixed reviews from critics.

== Plot ==
Vinay Panicker is the head of an advertising agency based in Mumbai. He is married to Nalini and they have a son. Vijay asks for a transfer to Kochi and moves to Kochi to take over the Kochi branch. He is impressed by the works of a creative director, Neena, an alcoholic and tomboy girl in his company. He also learns that she works in her own terms, comes and leaves office at her own will. She does not go along well with her colleagues. Vinay is open to her oddities and which makes Nalini to binge eat. Slowly Neena falls in love with Vinay. During a dance party, Neena asks Vinay to kiss her. Vinay startles and shrugs her off and goes home. Disturbed Vinay comes home and Neena calls. Vinay puts the phone on speaker and tells Neena that he is committed to his wife and is not up for an extramarital relation in the presence of Nalini. Devastated, Neena goes missing for 5 days. Neena attempts suicide and Vinay is called by the hospital staff from Neena's contacts. The hospital staff mistake Vinay to be her husband. The doctor advises Vinay to take Neena to a well known rehab centre at the earliest since she is a complete alcoholic and a young person who can recover. The rehab centre will allow only family members or couples. Vinay tries to contact Neena's estranged family but her father is sick and unable to travel. After telling Nalini and feeling guilty, Vinay decides to take Neena to the rehab centre by posing as Neena's husband.

During the course of treatment Vinay starts to develop feelings for Neena. Vinay even approaches Neena. This ashames Neena and begins to distance away from Vinay. She begins to avoid Vinay and tells him, she is in touch with her office colleague Karthik. Vinay who kept a certain integrity in his relationship with Neena begins to be possessive and upset by Neena's approach. Counselor Pearl explains to Vinay about Neena's behavior and says she knows that both Vinay and Neena aren't husband and wife. Whatever Neena said or done before coming to Rehab Center was by the intoxicated effect of alcoholism and inebriated father-fixation. After unsuccessfully trying to get in touch with her husband Nalini comes over and accidentally hears this conversation between Pearl and Vinay and understands his feelings for her have changed. When the treatment is over and Neena and Vinay go back to Cochin, Neena asks Vinay to drop her on the way and claims Karthik will come by to pick her to take her home. She also resigns from her job saying she needs to take a break and leave the place for a change in atmosphere. Neena's parents come by and picks up Neena and commends her for leaving Vinay with his family and that is best kind of love she can give to him. Neena deletes Vinay's photos and contact number from her phone. Vinay is hurt and wasn't able to bear the toll and gets drunk and goes home to Nalini and confides in her in an apologizing manner. Nalini remembers what Pearl has told and strengthened her with the insight that "In Vinay's life there would be only one woman and that is Nalini". In the end it is shown that Neena is in Russia and remembers Vinay lovingly and holds on to his jacket.

== Cast ==
- Deepti Sati as Neena
- Ann Augustine as Nalini Panicker
- Vijay Babu as Vinay Panicker
- Lena as Counselor Pearl
- Martin Prakkat as Dr. Nirmal Jacob
- Sadiq as Dr. Balachandran
- Vinu Mohan as Sunnykutty
- Chemban Vinod Jose as Geljo aka Kari Oil
- Sunil Sukhada as Idicula
- Basil Kothamangalam as Koshi
- Nelson as Drunkard
- Hareesh Perumanna as P. Kunhimuhammad
- Sneha Sreekumar as Rufiya
- Nikhil J. Menon as Pradhish
- Deepa R. Krishnan
- Nidheesh S. as Waiter

== Production ==
After the world tour, Lal Jose announced that his next will be a women-centric film, titled Nee-Na. He also announced that two women named Neena and Nalini will be the title characters. In 2014 November, Lal Jose confirmed that actor-producer Vijay Babu will play the male lead in Nee-Na. In December, he announced that Ann Augustine will play one female lead - Nalini. He also stated that a new face will play the other female lead - Neena. In 2015 January, Lal Jose informed that former Miss Kerala Deepti Sati will portray Neena. The principal photography of Nee-Na started on 18 February at Saint Petersburg, Russia.

== Online release ==
The movie was released online on Reelmonk.com to non-resident Indian audience on 20 July 2015. "The Kerala diaspora is said to be close to 2.5 million and living mostly in the Middle East" said Lal Jose, shared that during his European tour, he met many Malayalis who complained about their inability to watch new Malayalam movies as and when they are released in India. "They also shared that they were forced to watch pirated versions for want of an option to watch them legally," he added.

== Soundtrack ==
Nee-Na

Film score by Nikhil J. Menon
- Released: 5 May 2015
- Genre: Film soundtrack
- Length: 16:03
- Label: Muzik 247
- Producer: Nikhil J. Menon

Nee-Na
No.	Title	Singer(s)	Length
1.	"I Remember You (Female Version)"	Shathisree Gopalan	03:47
2.	"I Remember You (Male Version)"	Nikhil J. Menon	02:59
3.	"Then Nila"	Sachin Warrier	04:18
4.	"Where Gravity Fails"	Nikhil J. Menon	04:57
Total length:			16:03
