= Maharaja Hostel =

2026 Indian horror-comedy film

- Theatrical release poster
- Directed by: Charu Wakan
- Written by: Charu Wakan; Raja
- Produced by: Karumuru Raghu Ramu; Charvaka Brahmanapally; Rahul Mopidevi; Ramya Vemulapati; Sai Prakash Bhuvanagiri
- Starring: Akhil NRD; Akhil Shah; Sarath Babu; Sandeep SP; Ann Maria; Abhirami Girish; Chitra Nair; Sajin Cherukayil; Vinod Kovoor; Sreeram Sethu Madhav
- Cinematography: Ashkar Ali
- Edited by: Nitish Mishra
- Music by: Ashwin Ram
- Production companies: Charuchitra Productions; Madhumitha Productions; Monsoon Tales
- Distributed by: Capital Cinema (Kerala); PHF (Overseas)
- Release date: 24 June 2026 (Kerala)
- Running time: 130 minutes
- Country: India
- Language: Malayalam

Maharaja Hostel is an 2026 Indian Malayalam-language horror-comedy film directed by Charu Wakan. The film features a cast composed primarily of social media sensations, including Akhil NRD, Akhil Shah, Sarath Babu, and Sandeep SP. Maharaja Hostel was released on 25 July 2026 and received negative reviews from critics.

== Plot ==
The film follows three engineering students who, seeking affordable accommodation, decide to move into a hostel. Their decision quickly transforms into a fight for survival as they encounter eerie happenings within the facility. As fear mounts and danger escalates, the protagonists must work to uncover the truth behind the mysterious hostel before it is too late. The story also centers on the relationship between the students and the hostel's warden.

== Cast ==
- Akhil NRD as Aravind
- Akhil Shamon as Varkey
- Sarath Babu as Midhun
- Sandeep S. P. as Shambhu
- Ann Maria Thomas as Deepika
- Abhirami Girish as Goddess/Ghost
- Chitra Nair as Teacher
- Sajin Cherukayil as Warden
- Vinod Kovoor as MGR
- Sreeram Sethu Madhav as Praveen
- Pooja as Vadhu
- Anjana Mohan as Nandini
- Mukkam Shareef as Varkey’s father
- Saritha Sangeeth as Varkey’s mother
- Prasad as Aravind’s father
- Premjitha as Aravind’s mother
- Andrea Lisa Mathew as Aravind’s sister
- Afsal Alappuzha as Midhun’s father

== Production ==
=== Development ===
Principal photography for Maharaja Hostel commenced in February 2025. Filming took place across multiple locations in India, including Kochi, Vagamon, Kumbalangi, Cherthala, Malayattoor and Hyderabad. The film is produced by Charvaka Brahmanapally, Karumuru Raghu Ramu, Rahul Mopidevi, Ramya Vemulapati, and Sai Prakash Bhuvanagiri under the production banners of Charuchitra Productions, Madhumitha Productions, and Monsoon Tales.

=== Filming ===
The production design focused on grounding the horror-comedy elements within the setting of a haunted-like city hostel. Filming took place across varied environments to capture the necessary atmosphere, balancing the comedic interactions of the students with the suspense of the horror sequences.

== Music ==
The musical score for the film is composed by Ashwin Ram, with lyrics penned by Jishnu M Nair. The soundtrack serves as a key promotional element for the film. One of the tracks, "Magnetic Kannane Cornet Pol Sweetane," has been released as a single and received positive reception. The film features a total of four songs, each designed to complement the shift between the narrative's humorous and terrifying beats.

== Release ==
The film's teaser was released on January 24, 2026, gaining attention for its blend of laughs and scares. Maharaja Hostel is set for a wide theatrical release on July 24, 2026. Distribution is managed by Capital Cinema in Kerala, with PHF handling release for overseas and other Indian markets.

== Reception ==
The film was released on 25 July 2026 and was panned by critics. Anandu Suresh of The Indian Express described it as the worst Malayalam film of 2026. He wrote, If the comedy is bad, the horror is far worse, and Maharaja Hostel would make one develop a newfound respect for many of director Vinayan's horror films.
