= Utopiayile Rajavu =

- Film Poster
- Directed by: Kamal
- Screenplay by: PS Rafeeque
- Produced by: Haseeb Haneef; Noushad Alathur
- Starring: Mammootty; Jewel Mary; S.P.Sreekumar; Sunil Sukhada; Indrans; Jayaprakash Kulur; KPAC Lalitha
- Cinematography: Neil D Cunha
- Edited by: Rajagopal
- Music by: Ouseppachan; Lyrics: PS Rafeeque
- Production company: Grande Film Corporation
- Distributed by: Play House Release
- Release date: 27 August 2015
- Country: India
- Language: Malayalam
- Box office: est. ₹1.5crore

Utopiayile Rajavu (English: The King Of Utopia) is a 2015 Malayalam satirical comedy film directed by Kamal and penned by PS Rafeeque. It stars Mammootty,S. P. Sreekumar, Jewel Mary, KPAC Lalitha, Janardhanan, Tini Tom, Joy Mathew, Sudheer Karamana, Nandu and Indrans. Ouseppachan composed the soundtrack. The film released on 27 August 2015.

== Plot ==
The film follows the life of CP Swathanthryan, son of freedom fighter Chembakassery Parameswaran Pillai. His uncle, Soman Thampi, is a crook who envies CP's wealth and is a constant troublemaker for him. He is determined to win the legal suit filed by CP. Losing it would result in reinstating the wealth he forcibly obtained. CP wants to be famous at any cost, which triggers hilarious events. After many incidents, he realizes that one should not chase fame; fame should chase us based on our deeds. The rest of the story deals with how he brings justice to people to whom it was denied and delayed.

== Cast ==
- Mammootty as C.P Swathanthran
- Jewel Mary as Umadevi
- Joy Mathew as Chembakasseri Parameshwaran Pillai
- S. P. Sreekumar as Pindani Manikandan
- Sunil Sukhada as Soman Pilla
- Tini Tom as Statue of Jesus Christ
- Salim Kumar (Voice) as Crow
- Indrans as Velappan
- Janardhanan as Vasavan Pillai
- KPAC Lalitha as Narayani
- Noby Marcose as Kattappuram Kuttappan
- Sudheer Karamana as CI Purushothaman
- Sadiq as Ramakrishnan
- Jayaraj Warrier as Markandeyan
- Sasi Kalinga as Murari
- Sethulakshmi as Januvamma
- Pradeep Kottayam as Poornachandran
- Nandu as Ayyappan Nadar
- Manju Sunichan as Saritha
- Anjana Appukuttan as Crying Baby's Mother
- Munshi Venu as Velayudhan
- Mukundan as Chief Minister
- Jayaprakash Kuloor as Sakhavu Theekkoyi
- Sneha Sreekumar as Thankamani
- Vijayan Paringodu as Advocate Thirumunbu
- Surabhi Lakshmi as Zaira Bhanu
- Jayashankar Karimuttam as Chachappan
- Anoop Chandran as Advocate
- M. G. Sasi as Advocate
- Jayan Cherthala as Sudhakaran Pillai
- Majeed as Advocate
- Muhammed Perambra as Aboobacker
- Naseer Sankranthi as Danger Dasappan
- KTC Abdulla as Sairabhanu's father
- Bindu Aneesh as Swathanthran's Mother
- Sumathi G. as SCPO Malleswari
- Surjith Gopinath

== Production ==
Kamal directed. PS Rafeeque approached Mammootty with the script on the set of Bhaskar The Rascal. The actor immediately accepted and suggested Kamal as director. Kamal, too, committed to the project. Kamal said, "Animals, birds and even statues will voice their opinion in Utopiayile Rajavu,". Mammootty also recommended Jewel Mary for the heroine.

The film launched in Kochi on 18 May 2015 during which sewing machines were donated to women from tribal communities. The shoot started at Thodupuzha, Kerala, in May 2015. The film was shot in Trivandrum.

== Soundtrack ==
The music was composed by Ouseppachan and lyrics were written by P. S. Rafeeque. The audio launch was held at Ernakulam on 2 August 2015. The first song released was "Uppinu Pona Vazhiyethu".

No.	Title	Singer
1	"Chantham Thelinju" (Duet)	Rahul R. Nath, Mridula Warrier
2	"Laavettom"	Resmi Satheesh, Sunil, Sudheer Alathur
3	"Uppinu Pona"	Vaikom Vijayalakshmi, Jassie Gift, Rahul R. Nath
4	"Chantham Thelinju" (Solo)	P. Jayachandran
