= Kanthari =

- Directed by: Ajmal
- Written by: Ajmal
- Produced by: R Prabhu Kumar
- Starring: Sekhar Menon; Rachana Narayanankutty; Subiksha
- Cinematography: Noushad Shereef
- Edited by: Ajay Devaloka
- Distributed by: Praveeth & Pravitha Arts Release
- Release date: 19 June 2015
- Country: India
- Language: Malayalam

Kanthari is a 2015 Indian Malayalam-language feature film directed by Ajmal. The film stars Rachana Narayanankutty, Sekhar Menon, Subiksha, Rajshri Nair, Sreejith Ravi, Manav, Balaji and others.

== Cast ==
- Rachana Narayanankutty
- Sekhar Menon
- Subiksha as Sulthana
- Rajasree Nair as Vimala
- Sreejith Ravi
- Sasi Kalinga
- Manav
- Neena Kurup
- Balaji Sarma
- Zeenath
- Resmi Anil
- Thalaivasal Vijay in a cameo appearance

== Reception ==
A critic from The Times of India wrote that "The story lacks depth to hook the audience and it stands on a shaky premise throughout".
