= Sreedhanya =

Indian actress and television host

- Born: Sreedhanya Thekkedath; Kerala, India
- Other name: Gayathri
- Occupation: Actress
- Years active: 2010-present

Sreedhanya Thekkedath, known mononymously as Sreedhanya, is an Indian actress and television host who works in predominantly Malayalam-language films and television shows.

== Career ==
Sreedhanya participated in a talk show on Jeevan TV before receiving her first show as an anchor with Samantharam on Amrita TV. She went on to host several shows including Vaidyasala, Veedu, and Grihathuram. She played supporting roles in several films before playing one of the leads in Njan Samvidhanam Cheyyum under the stage name of Gayathri. She worked as a Malayalam tutor for Vidya Balan for the film Aami before Balan left the project. In 2017, she replaced Bhagyalakshmi as a host for "Selfie" on Kairali TV.

== Filmography ==
- All films are in Malayalam, unless otherwise noted.

Year	Title	Role	Notes
2010	Kadaksham	Nirmala	
2013	3 Dots	Beena Mathew Paul	
2013	Left Right Left	Anu	
2013	Tharattu Pattu	Crying baby boy's mother	Short film
2014	Manglish	Seenath	
2014	Mummiyude Swantham Achoos	Sandra Roy	
2015	Njan Samvidhanam Cheyyum	Gayathri Devi	credited as Gayathri
2017	Rakshadhikari Baiju Oppu	Nirmala	
2018	Kadal Kuthiraigal	School teacher	Tamil film
2019	Irupathiyonnaam Noottaandu	Prabha	
2019	Ivide Ee Nagarathil	Sreedhanya	
2019	Pranaya Meenukalude Kadal	Sulfath Beevi	
2020	Innaleyolam	Vineetha	Short film
2022	Makal	Dr. Susan	
2022	Dancing Queen	Mother	Hindi Short film
2022	Haya	Shalini	
2023	Pranaya Vilasam	Anusree	
2023	Corona Papers	Shankararaman's daughter-in-law	
2023	Philip's	Asha	
2023	Thaal		
2023	Neru	Parveen	
2024	Qalb	Treasa	
2025	Diés Iraé	Sunitha	
2025	Haal	Bincy	
2026	Dridam	Deepa	

== Television ==
Year	Show	Role	Channel	Notes
2011	Samantharam	Host	Amrita TV	
2011	Vaidyasala	Host		
2012	Grihathuram	Host	Asianet News	
2012	Mr Perfectionist	Host	Asianet News	
2013	Veedu	Host	Manorama News	
2017-2018	Selfie	Host	Kairali TV	
2021–2023	Koodevide	Aditi Padmanabhan	Asianet	
2021	Start Music Season 3	Participant	Asianet	Game show
2023 – 2024	Mazhayethum Mumpe	Mythili	Amrita TV	
2023 – 2024	Maaattha Bangaaram	Saraswathi	ETV (Telugu)	Telugu TV series

== Awards and nominations ==
Year	Award	Category	Work	Result	Ref.
2012	Kerala State Television Awards	Best Compere / Anchor	Gruhathuram	Won	
2014	Jaycey Foundation Award	Best Compere / Anchor	Gruhathuram	Won	
2017	Malayala Puraskaram	Best Compere / Anchor	Selfie	Won	
2022	Asianet Television Awards	Best Supporting Actress	Koodevide	Nominated	
2022	Asianet Television Awards	Best Supporting Actress ( Jury )	Koodevide	Won	
2024	Kerala State Television Awards	Best Actress	Mazhayethum Mumpe	Won	
