= The Reporter (film) =

2015 Indian Malayalam film

- Theatrical release poster
- Directed by: Venugopan
- Written by: S. Suresh Babu
- Produced by: K. R. Baburaj; Raju Panayamkulam
- Starring: Kailash; Samuthirakani; Ananya; Abhinaya
- Cinematography: Alagappan N
- Edited by: Sujoy Joseph
- Music by: Sharreth
- Production company: Sarayu Movies
- Release date: 6 March 2015
- Country: India
- Language: Malayalam

The Reporter is a 2015 Indian Malayalam mystery thriller-romance film directed by Venugopan. The film stars Kailash, Samuthirakani, Ananya, and Abhinaya. The shooting was completed in 2012 but the film was released in 2015. The plot is loosely based on the brutal 2012 rape and murder of Soumya and emphasizes how being silent about a crime is a crime in itself.

== Plot ==
Eby Mathew was engaged to Sara, who falls prey to one of the most brutal cases of rape and subsequent homicide. The fate of Sara would have been different if the other passengers of the same train were not so ignorant of the glimpses of the unusual. They also prevent Ravi Pillai, a fellow passenger (and a friend of Eby, although he didn't know that Sara was the victim), from responding.

A grief-stricken Eby feels the passengers are as guilty as the criminal, although they are not culprits in the eyes of the law. With the help of Ravi Pillai, he kidnaps each of them to seek revenge but finally lets them go when they regret their failure to prevent the brutalities against Sara.

== Cast ==
- Kailash as Eby Mathew
- Samuthirakani as DySP Parthasarathy
- Ananya as Tara Viswanath
- Abhinaya as Sara
- Jagathy as Ravi Pillai
- Sasi Kalinga as SI Chandran
- Lena as Vinitha teacher
- Geetha Vijayan as Lisa
- Sadiq as Thomas
- Manikandan Pattambi as Sasidharan
- Madhupal as Shaji KR
- Chali Pala as Mannu Varkeychan
- Karamana Sudheer as Inspector Stephen Varghese
- Mukundan as Manoj Puthiyamana
- Malavika Nair as Sara's sister
- Meena Ganesh as Tea Stall owner
- Sajitha Madathil as Manoj's wife
- Aliya as Racheal
- Kannur Sreelatha as Mother Superior
- Anjana as Nun
- Pradeep Kottayam as Chittappan
- VP Ramachandran Nair as Superintendent of Police
- Aswin K Rajeev as Student

== Production ==
The film marks the second collaboration between Samuthirakani, Ananya, and Abhinaya after Naadodigal (2009). The first schedule was shot at Guruvayoor.

== Music ==
The film's soundtrack was composed by Sharreth. The lyrics of these songs are written by Vayalar Sarath Chandra Varma.

| No. | Title | Artist(s) | Length |
|---|---|---|---|
| 1. | "Mullaikkoru nanamadi" | Seena | 3:21 |
| 2. | "Nee En Kaathare" | K S Chitra and Shabeer | 4:20 |
| 3. | "Ekayayi" | Palakkad Sreeram | 4:14 |
| 4. | "Karukkal Nirathi" | Sharreth | 3:39 |
| 5. | "Varmathiye" | Palakkad Sreeram | 3:41 |
