= Marimayam =

Indian sitcom

- Genre: Comedy drama Sitcom
- Created by: R. Unnikrishnan
- Written by: Shihab Karunagappally; N. P. Sajeesh; Vaddakumthala Sreekumar; Jeo Baby; Rajeev Karumadi; S. S. Sumesh Kumar Jayaratnam Padyam
- Directed by: Midhun Chettoor; Gopalan Manoj; A. S. Vinod; R. Unnikrishnan; Chandrakala
- Starring: See full list
- Opening theme: Nerittum.. Porittum.. Verittum.. Marimayam
- Country of origin: India
- Original language: Malayalam
- No. of seasons: 1
- No. of episodes: 1002

Production
- Running time: 25 minutes (approx.)

Original release
- Network: Mazhavil Manorama
- Release: 31 October 2011 – present

Marimayam (transl. Deceit) is an Indian Malayalam-language television sitcom broadcast on Mazhavil Manorama since 5 November 2011. It showcases satirical sketches depicting typical scenarios observed at government institutions and societal trials faced by common man. The show stars Manikandan Pattambi, Vinod Kovoor, Sneha Sreekumar, Niyas Backer, Riyas Narmakala, Mani Shornur, Unni Raj and Salim Hasan in regular roles.

The show features two crossover episodes with Thatteem Mutteem, a sitcom, in 2016 and 2021. These special episodes, titled Marithatteem Mayammutteem and Thatteem Mayam Mutteem Mayam respectively, aired on weekends on the same channel. All of them served as a festive backdrop to Onam celebrations.

The series, which premiered in 2011, is among the longest-running Malayalam television programmes of its genre, having completed over 15 years of broadcast. It marked its 1,000th episode on 2 November 2026, with Kerala Chief Minister V. D. Satheesan making a special guest appearance to commemorate the milestone.

== Plot summary ==
The comedians present satirical sketches describing the encounters the common man faces while visiting government institutions. The comedians also represent social issues and how they affect commoners.

== Cast ==
=== Main ===
- Manikandan Pattambi as Sathyasheelan
- Niyas Backer as Koya / Sheethalan
- Riyas Narmakala as Manmadan
- Vinod Kovoor as Moidu / Iype/ Aromal
- Sneha Sreekumar as Mandodari / Suhara
- Salim Hassan as Pyarijathan
- Mani Shornur as Sugathan
- Unni Raja as Unni
- Raghavan as Raghavettan
- Prasad as Prasad

=== Recurring ===
- Aleena Thankachan as Nishagandhi
- Greeshma Ramachandran
- Lakshmi Dhanya Saju as Lakshmi
- Anagha Maria Varghese as Chandini
- Darshana Sudarshan as Charulatha(Charu)
- Vedika Rajesh as Damayanti
- Mintu Maria Vincent as Sugandhi
- Parvathy Raveendran as Sumitra
- Sanuja
- Sudhi

=== Former ===
- Rachana Narayanankutty as Valsala
- Manju Pathrose as Shyamala
- S. P. Sreekumar as Lolithan
- Sidhartha Siva as Swayamvaran
- Anoop Chandran as Narayana Pisharody
- V. P. Khalid as Sumesh (deceased)
- Sarayu Mohan as Sumitra
- Praveen Prem as Perakkutty
- Kshama Krishna as Sulochana
- Meenakshi Raveendran as Meera/Kingini
- Manju Vineesh as Mymuna
- Shibila
- Hareesh Kanaran

== Awards ==
Marimayam is the only Malayalam television show to have won the 'Best Comedy Show' award at the Kerala State Television Awards for five consecutive years.

Award	Year	Category	Recipient
Kerala State Television Award	2015	Best Comedy Show	Marimayam
Kerala State Television Award	2016	Best Comedy Show	Marimayam
Kerala State Television Award	2017	Best Comedy Show	Marimayam
Kerala State Television Award	2018	Best Comedy Show	Marimayam
Kerala State Television Award	2019	Best Comedy Show	Marimayam
Kerala State Television Award	2020	Best Comedy Show	Marimayam
Kerala State Television Award	2020	Special Jury Award	Salim Hassan
Kerala State Television Award	2024	Best Entertainment Show	Marimayam
Kerala Vision Television Awards	2024	Best Actress in a Comedy Role	Sneha Sreekumar
Kerala Vision Television Awards	2026	Best Comedy Actor	Niyaz Backer
Kerala Vision Television Awards	2026	Popular TV Show	Marimayam
