= Ammakkoru Tharattu =

- Directed by: Sreekumaran Thampi
- Written by: Sreekumaran Thampi
- Screenplay by: Sreekumaran Thampi
- Produced by: Ragamalika Combines
- Starring: Sharada; Madhu; Suraj Venjarammoodu; Niyas Backer
- Cinematography: Sanjeev Shankar
- Music by: Sreekumaran Thampi
- Release date: 9 January 2015
- Running time: 150 min
- Country: India
- Language: Malayalam

Ammakkoru Tharattu is a 2015 Indian Malayalam film written and directed by Sreekumaran Thampi. It stars Sharada, Madhu, Suraj Venjarammoodu, Manju Pillai, Bindu Panicker, Manikandan Pattambi, Sai Kumar, P. Sreekumar, Indrans, Mamukkoya in the lead roles.

== Cast ==
- Sharada
- Madhu
- Suraj Venjarammoodu
- Lakshmi Gopalaswamy
- Indrans
- Manikandan Pattambi
- Sai Kumar
- P.Sreekumar
- Bindu Panicker
- Mamukkoya
- Manju Pillai
- Niyas Backer

== Soundtrack ==
The songs are written and composed by Sreekumaran Thampi himself.
