= Ithinumappuram =

- Directed by: Manoj Alunkal
- Written by: Manoj Alunkal
- Produced by: Manoj Alunkal
- Starring: Riyaz Khan; Meera Jasmine
- Music by: Vidhyadharan Master
- Production company: Agna Media
- Release date: 9 October 2015
- Country: India
- Language: Malayalam

Ithinumappuram is a 2015 Indian Malayalam drama film written, directed, and produced by Manoj Alunkal. It stars Meera Jasmine and Riyaz Khan in the lead roles.

It was released in India on 9 October 2015.

== Cast ==
- Meera Jasmine as Rukmini
- Riyaz Khan as Karthikeyan
- Lakshmipriya as Devu
- Siddique as Eppachan
- Lalu Alex as Dhanapalan
- Ambika Mohan as Savithri, Rukmini's mother
- Kalashala Babu as Madhava Menon, Rukmini's father
- Vijayakumar as Broker
- Sona Nair as Leela
- Narayanankutty as Dasan
- Kulappulli Leela as Sarasu
- Meena Ganesh as Thanka
- Tony as Dr Varghese
- Babu Jose as Politician
- Punnapra Appachan as Narayanan
- Baby Durga Premjith as Sneha
- Baby Anjana Arundev as Anahha

== Plot ==
Rukmini elopes with Karthikeyan who was their driver and is now settled in a faraway place in a rented house. They have two children Anahha who is good at studies and Sneha who is dumb. Karthikeyan works as supervisor in a coir manufacturing unit of Eepachan, and spends his earning on his own leisures. He does not care of his family as Rukmini had eloped with him without taking any valuables from her house. He does not allow Rukmini to go for any work. Dhanapalan was a money lender and his wife Leela were not blessed with children despite married for years. Leela had a soft corner for Rukmini and often helps her.

Though Karthikeyan is not accepted by the workers in the coir factory, he manages to get the faith of Eepachan. Karthikeyan gets attracted by a lady employee of the factory Devu, and Devu's mother who is also an employee of that factory motivates her daughter to attract Karthikeyan for financial gains. Once Rukmini knows about this affair, he argues with Karthikeyan and he attacks her. On another day Karthikeyan elopes with Devu.

Despite no source of income, to make a living Rukmini goes to work in Eepachan's coir factory. While Anhha goes to school, Sheha is left at Dhanapalans house. Eepachan had desires for her. But she never allowed it. It was also found that Rukmini is pregnant for the third time. Eepachan advises an abortion, but Rukmini mentions that despite her hardships she will bring the third child also. As a revenge Rukmini is made to do strenuous jobs.

As days pass by Rukmini gives birth to a baby boy. And then she is back to work leaving the new born and Sheha with Leela. Anahha gets rewarded in school as she bags the first prize in the scholarship event. While getting back from work, Rukmini picks the baby and Sneha and walks home. On the way back from school, Anahha sees them and with excitement she runs to them to show her mother the scholarship award. A jeep hits her and she gets seriously injured. The nearby government hospital refers her to a private hospital where an emergency operation is suggested and she must place ₹2000 as security. She runs to Eapachan for help, who leaves her empty handed. She then runs to Dhanapalan who offers the money. But Leela places a suggestion that she wants her son in return, as she will bring him up with all luxury. Though Rukmini was reluctant, the thoughts of her hospitalised daughter forces her to rush to hospital. She was late and Anahha is declared dead. Doctor suggests to take the girls body as experiment specimen for their medical college students and pay the compensation to Rukmini. Rukmini signs the documents and leaves the hospital holding Sneha's hand.
