= S. P. Sreekumar =

Indian actor

- Born: Thiruvananthapuram, Kerala, India
- Other names: Lolithan, Uthaman
- Education: Swathi Thirunal College of Music
- Occupation: Actor
- Years active: 2008–present
- Spouse: Sneha Sreekumar

S. P. Sreekumar is an Indian actor who works in Malayalam cinema and television.

His first television show was Chirikidathom on Amrita TV and later his performance as Lolithan in Marimayam gave him the big break. Within a short span of time Sreekumar has played a variety of roles in the film industry. He played a tribal youth Sankaran, in Papilio Buddha, but in his next outing ABCD: American-Born Confused Desi, he played Lloyd, a typical Kochiite with the local slang, and a serial killer in the film Memories.

Sreekumar says "Acting is my passion and hence I don't mind playing a comic role, a serious one or even a character with grey shades. It all depends on the quality of work, and whatever role I do, I will do it with all sincerity."

He married television anchor and actress Sneha Sreekumar in 2019.

== Controversy ==
In December 2024, sexual assault complaint has been filed against lead actors of Uppum Mulakum, Sreekumar and Biju Sopanam. The complaint, lodged by a female actress, alleges that she was assaulted during the shoot of the series. One of the accused is alleged to have assaulted the actress, while the other is accused of threatening her to prevent her from speaking out. The case was initially registered by the Infopark Police and has since been transferred to the Thrikkakara Police for further investigation. A special investigation team (SIT) has been formed to probe the matter.

== Awards ==
Kerala State Television Awards

- 2014 – Special Mention – Marimayam

== Filmography ==
List of S. P. Sreekumar film credits
Year	Title	Role	Notes
2010	Kandahar	Cadet	
2011	Dam 999		
2011	Veeraputhran	K. Kelappan	
2012	Puthiya Theerangal		
2013	Papilio Buddha	Sankaran	
2013	ABCD: American-Born Confused Desi	Lloyd Fernandes	
2013	Memories	Peter/Anand	
2013	Papilio Buddha	Prahlathan	
2013	Vallatha Pahayan	Shankaran	
2014	Salaam Kashmier	Vinu	
2015	Aadupuliyattam	Appu	
2015	Ivan Maryadaraman	Broker	
2015	Utopiayile Rajavu	Pindani	
2015	John Honai	Janardhanan	
2016	Campus Diary		
2016	Kappiri Thuruthu	Panchi	
2017	Ayaal Sassi		
2018	Neeli	Jalal	
2018	Chalakkudikkaran Changathi	Joseph	
2019	Prathi Poovankozhi	Chacko	
2019	Soothrakkaran	Film Director	
2022	The Warriorr	Guru's henchman	Telugu–Tamil bilingual film
2023	2018	Joseph	
2023	Kannur Squad	Shiju Velayudhan	

== Television ==
List of S. P. Sreekumar television credits
Year	Title	Role	Channel	Notes
2010	Chirikidatham		Amrita TV	
2011–2014	Marimayam	Lolithan	Mazhavil Manorama	
2015	Back Benchers	Student	Amrita TV	
2015–2019	Uppum Mulakum	Sreekuttan a.k.a. Kuttumaaman	Flowers TV	TV sitcom
2018–2019	Kalli Walli	Krishnakumar a.k.a. Kunchu	Kairali TV	TV sitcom
2020–2021	Nellikka	Appukkuttan	Kairali TV	TV sitcom
2020–2024	Chakkappazham	Uthaman	Flowers	TV sitcom
2024	Uppum Mulakum 3	Sreekuttan a.k.a. Kuttumaaman	Flowers TV	TV sitcom
