= Rajamma @ Yahoo =

- Theatrical release poster
- Directed by: Reghu Rama Varma
- Written by: M. Sindhuraj
- Produced by: Shine Augustine; Ramesh Nambiar; Benny; T. C. Babu
- Starring: Kunchacko Boban; Asif Ali
- Cinematography: S. Kumar
- Edited by: Ranjan Abraham
- Music by: Bijibal
- Production company: MTM Wellflow Productions
- Distributed by: LJ Films
- Release date: 11 November 2015
- Country: India
- Language: Malayalam
- Box office: ₹5.5 crore (US$571,134) (21 days)

Rajamma @ Yahoo (Read as Rajamma at Yahoo) is a 2015 Malayalam-language comedy film directed by Reghu Rama Varma (in his directorial debut). It stars Kunchacko Boban and Asif Ali. The film was released on 11 November 2015 coinciding with Diwali.

== Plot ==
Two brothers – Michel Rajamma known as Rajamma and Vishnu Yohannan known as Yahoo – are born to the inter-caste couple Yohannan and Rajamma, who had fallen in love during their college days. After the sudden demise of their parents, they live alone in their house, a bungalow under the care of Aimutty. After leading a carefree life, the duo plans to rent out parts of their bungalow to different families. One to Yahoo's girlfriend, Naseema and family, another to Pavitran, a village officer and another to Sherin, who came from Wayanad. The film follows Sherin and her problems, in which Rajamma and Yahoo intervene.

== Cast ==
- Kunchacko Boban as Michael Rajamma a.k.a. Rajamma
- Asif Ali as Vishnu Yohannan a.k.a. Yahoo
  - Master IIhan as Young Yahoo
- Renji Panicker as Mayor Abraham Pothen
- Nikki Galrani as Sherin
- Anusree as Naseema a.k.a. Nessi
- Kalabhavan Shajon as K. Pavithran Nair
- Mamukkoya as Aimoottikka
- Hareesh Perumanna as Thattukada Chandran
- Parvathy Nambiar as Najumma
- Kailash as Aby Thomas
- Sadiq as Manjapra Vasu
- Anil Murali as Kundara Surendran
- Vijayakumar as Antony, Pothan's son
- Saiju Kurup as Yohannan
- Tessa Joseph as Rajamma
- Sneha Sreekumar as Indu
- Yoga Thinesh as Karindrum
- Manjusha Sajish
- Muthumani as Mary Thomas

== Production ==
Rajamma @ Yahoo is the directorial debut of Raghu Rama Varma, the former assistant of director Lal Jose. The film was shot in Kozhikode. The script was penned by M. Sindhuraj. Produced by Ramesh Nambiar, Shine Augustine, Benny and T. C. Babu under the banner of MTM Wellflow Productions.

== Critical response ==
Anu James of International Business Times rated 2 out of 5 stars and said "The first half is interesting, but there are a few boring moments in the second part, making it just an average entertainer. There are a few moments that might make you laugh, but the film lacks a strong script. The chemistry between Kunchacko and Asif is impressive, but they could have done more if the film had a strong script", she also criticised the music.

Navamy Sudhish of The New Indian Express stated "Though the film has a delightful first half, the post-interval part is in need of a little more briskness. The director and scenarist Sindhuraj have succeeded in making Rajamma a neat entertainer as the film is devoid of any melodrama or unbearable attempts at humour", and praised Kunchacko's performance.

Akhila Menon of Filmibeat.com rated 2 out of 5 stars, she praised the lead performance and cinematography, but criticised the script, music and editing. She wrote "The first half was entertaining; while the second half and climax were weak and ineffective".

== Box office ==
The film collected ₹1.78 crore (US$180,000) in 3 days of release and ₹3.14 crore (US$330,000) in 7 days.

== Music ==
Lyrics penned by Rafeeq Ahammed, Anil Panachooran, Santhosh Varma and D. B. Ajith Kumar have been tuned by Bijibal, who also scores the background score. Music released under the label Muzik247.

Track	Title	Artist (s)	Length
1	"Meghamani"	Najim Arshad	3:32
2	"Ullathu Chonnaal"	Vineeth Sreenivasan, Sangeetha Sreekanth	3:39
3	"Ottathoval"	Ganesh Sundaram, Roopa Revathi	2:56
4	"Maanaanivalude"	Alphons Joseph	3:53
5	"Olivile Kalikal"	Bijibal	2:42
