= Deepti Sati =

Indian actress and model

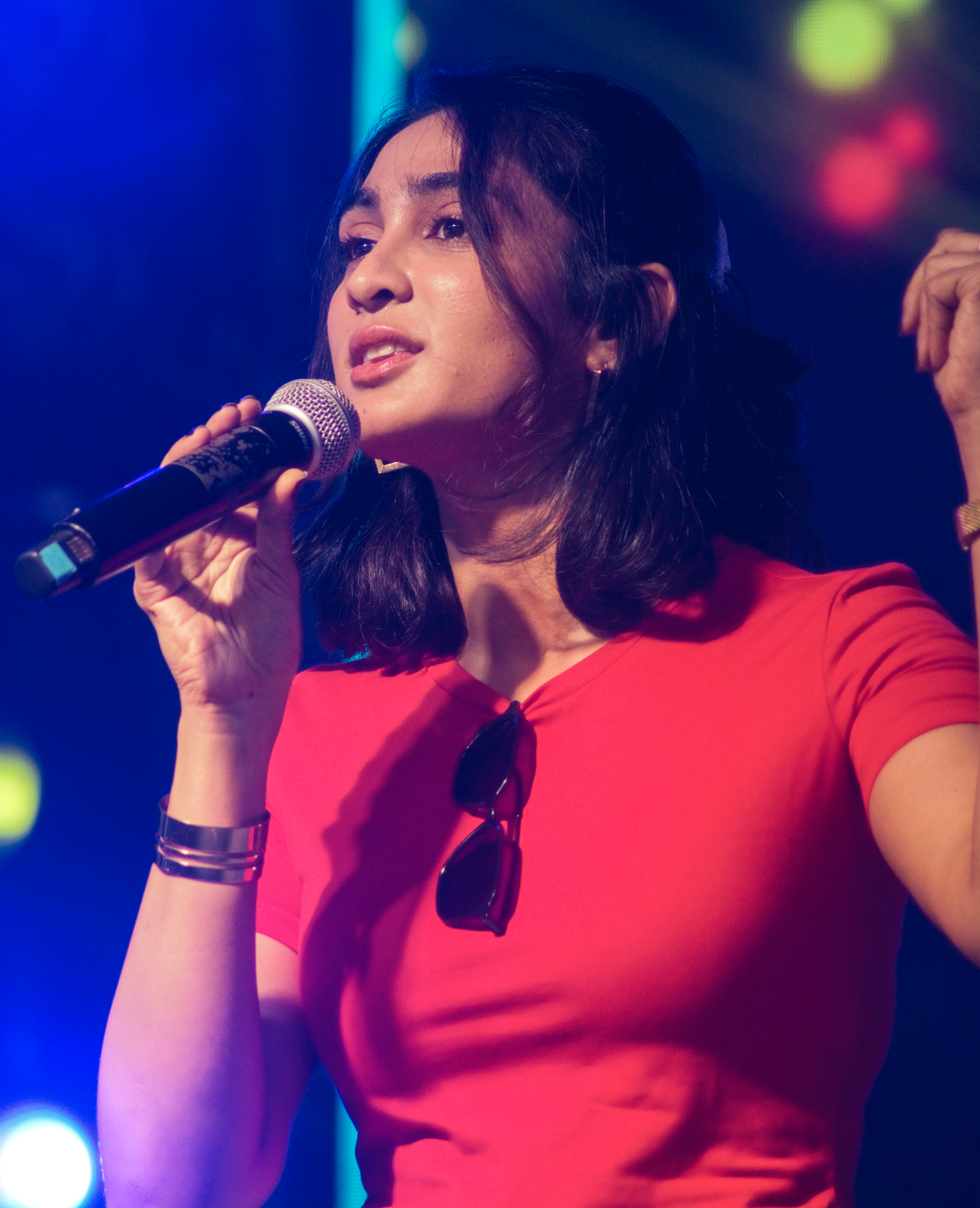
- Deepti Sati in 2025
- Born: Deepti Sati; Mumbai, Maharashtra, India
- Education: St. Xavier's College, Mumbai
- Occupations: Actress; Model
- Years active: 2015–present

Deepti Sati is an Indian actress and model who predominantly appears in Malayalam films. She has also appeared in Marathi, Kannada, Tamil and Telugu films. She made her acting debut in 2015 with Nee-Na.

Deepti went onto star in film including Jaguar, Solo, Luckee and Driving Licence. She made her web debut with Pearlish in 2019 and has also been judge on television shows.

== Early life ==
Deepti Sati was born in Mumbai. Her father, Divyesh Sati, hails from Nainital, Uttarakhand while her mother Madhuri Sati, is a native of Kochi, Kerala.

Deepti Sati did her schooling from Canossa Convent High School, Andheri (E), Mumbai and pursued her bachelor's degree in business administration from the St. Xavier's College, Mumbai.

== Beauty pageants ==
- Impresario Miss Kerala in 2012
- Navy Queen in 2013
- Indian Princess in 2014 – First Runner-up
- Femina Miss India 2014 – Miss Talented 2014 & Miss Iron Maiden 2014.

== Career ==
Deepti Sati started her modelling career with a pageant called Pantaloon Fresh Face Hunt. Deepti Sati won the Impresario Miss Kerala 2012 title. She was one among the top ten finalists of Femina Miss India 2014 and was also awarded the titles Miss. Talented 2014 & Miss. Iron Maiden 2014. She also won the title Navy Queen 2013 and was the first runner up in the pageant Indian Princess 2013. Deepti Sati is a trained dancer in the Indian classical dance form called Kathak as well as Bharatanatyam and has undergone training since she was three years old.

Deepti Sati made her acting debut alongside Vijay Babu and Ann Augustine in the 2015 Malayalam movie Nee-Na, directed by Lal Jose, in which she played the title character as a creative director of an ad company. She impressed the audience with her powerful tomboyish character.

== Filmography ==
=== Films ===
Key
†	Denotes films that have not yet been released

Year	Title	Role	Language	Notes
2015	Nee-Na	Neena	Malayalam	Debut Malayalam film
2016	Jaguar	Priya	Kannada; Telugu	Debut Kannada film Debut Telugu film
2017	Pullikkaran Staraa	Manjima	Malayalam	
2017	Solo	Daisy	Malayalam; Tamil	Debut Tamil film
2017	Lavakusha	Jennifer	Malayalam	
2019	Luckee	Jiya	Marathi	Debut Marathi film
2019	Driving Licence	Bhama	Malayalam	
2021	Naanum Single Thaan	Swetha	Tamil	
2021	Ranam	Deepthi	Kannada	
2022	Lalitham Sundaram	Simy	Malayalam	
2022	In	Jennifer Fernandes	Malayalam	
2022	Pathonpatham Noottandu	Savithri / Velumbi Panikkathi	Malayalam	
2022	Ottu / Rendagam	Item dancer	Malayalam; Tamil	Cameo appearance
2022	Gold	Radha	Malayalam	Cameo appearance
2023	Raja Marthanda	Geetha	Kannada	
2024	Thaanara	Sradha	Malayalam	

=== Television ===
Year	Program Name	Role	Channel	Language
2017	Midukki	Judge	Mazhavil Manorama	Malayalam
2020	Comedy stars season 2	Judge	Asianet	Malayalam
2020	Chunkanu Chackochan	Performer	Asianet	Malayalam
2021	Red Carpet	Mentor	Amrita TV	Malayalam

=== Web series ===
Year	Program Name	Role	Network	Language
2019	Pearlish	Deepthi	YouTube	Malayalam
2019	Only For Singles	Ranjeeta	MX Player	Hindi
2020	SIN	Nandita	aha	Telugu
2020	Lockdown Talks	Deepti Sati	YouTube	Malayalam

=== Music video ===
Year	Title	Label	Singer	Note
2022	Pyaar Hai	Apni Dhun	Payal Dev	
2022	Jigar Party	Rowdy	Aalaap Raju	

== Awards and nominations ==
Year	Award category	Awarded work	Result
2015	Asianet Film Awards - Best New Face of the Year Female	Nee-Na	Won
2015	5th South Indian International Movie Awards - Best Debut Actress	Nee-Na	Nominated
2015	Vanitha Film Awards - Best Debut Actress	Nee-Na	Nominated
2015	Asiavision Awards - Best Debut Actress	Nee-Na	Nominated
2015	IIFA Utsavam - Performance In A Leading Role Female	Nee-Na	Nominated
2015	11th Ramu Kariat Award - Special Jury Award	Nee-Na	Won
