= Manja (film) =

- Directed by: Bijoy Urmise
- Screenplay by: Bijoy Urmise
- Story by: Bijoy Urmise
- Produced by: Rammohan S. Menon
- Starring: Niyas Backer; Shammi Thilakan; Ashokan; Joy Mathew
- Cinematography: Rajesh K. Narayanan
- Edited by: Mentos Antony
- Music by: Sejo John; Jessin Georgeh
- Production company: Lal Media Arts
- Distributed by: M Talkie Cinema
- Release date: 28 February 2014
- Running time: 110 minutes
- Country: India
- Language: Malayalam

Manja is a 2014 Malayalam comedy film written and directed by Bijoy Urmise. This is the first film directed by Binoy Urmise. It stars Niyas Backer in lead role and Shammi Thilakan, Ashokan and Joy Mathew in supporting roles.

== Plot ==
The film revolves around the central character Jackson, who is a hard working, simple young guy from a village. His greatest desire is to become a film star. His journey to achieve the goal in life and some interesting incidents is the main plot of the film.

== Cast ==
- Niyas Backer as Jackson
- Shammi Thilakan as Abhayaraj
- Ashokan as Prasad
- Joy Mathew as narrator
- Kulapulli Leela as Jackson's mother
- Balachandran Chullikad as Abhayaraj's friend
- Ramesh Pisharody
- Vijesh Vijay

== Soundtrack ==
Manja

Soundtrack album by Sejo John Jessin Georgeh
- Genre: Film
- Language: Malayalam

The film features songs composed by Sejo John and Jessin Georgeh and written by Santhosh Varma(Urulunnu Shakadam) and Bijoy Urmise.
