= Vinod Kovoor =

Indian film actor

- Born: Kannur district
- Occupations: Film director, actor
- Years active: 2003 – present
- Known for: Moidu in Marimayam; Moosa in M80 Moosa

Vinod Kovoor is an Indian actor best known for his work in Malayalam cinema. He gained attention in the comedy show Marimayam, broadcast by Mazhavil Manorama, which conveys a satirical picture of public offices in Kerala. He is also known for his role as "Moosakka" in M80 Moosa, a serial on Media one channel.

== Personal life ==
He started a mimicry troupe known as Tom & Jerry. He participated in reality shows in AmritaTV and SuryaTV which paved his way to the film field. He debuted with the movie Mazhanool Kanavu in 2003.

He also works as personal trainer and motivator for students. Currently he resides at Kovoor, Kozhikode with his family.

== Career ==
He has written books on mimicry and mono-act. His first book, Ekabhinaya Samaharam, has 25 scripts and most of it deals with social issues. His also released a second book, Kalolsavam Monoact. He received a Best actor Award for the short film Athe Karanathal from the National Film Festival. He was best actor for four years consecutively in Kerala Kalolsavam. He won best Excellency award by Rotary, J.C.I. He also received Best Television Anchor Award by K.C.L, Best Comedy artist Award by Kerala Hasyavedi, Kazhcha Award and Best child artist award for the drama Chandrolsavam in Kambissery Nadakolsavam. His Achayan role in the short film "Nerariyathe" was critically acclaimed.

== Filmography ==
Year	Title	Role	Notes
2003	Mazhanoolkkanavu		
2011	Adaminte Makan Abu	Moideen	
2012	Puthiya Theerangal		
2012	Ustad Hotel		
2013	Punyalan Agarbattis	Pappan	
2013	Athe Karanathal		
2013	Vishudhan		
2013	Vallatha Pahayan	Shukkur	
2014	Varsham	Aslam	
2014	Nerariyathe		
2014	Pattam Pole		
2015	Premam	Broker Shamsu	
2015	Kasthoorba		
2016	Happy Wedding		
2019	Shibu	Producer	
2021	Nizhal	Constable Sainudheen	
2021	Escape		
2024	Manasa Vacha		
2024	Panchayath Jetty	CPO Appu	
2026	Maharaja Hostel	MGR	

== Television series ==
Year	Show	Channel	Role
2012 – present	Marimayam	Mazhavil Manorama	Moidu/ Iyppe/Aaromal
2014 – 2018	M80 Moosa	Media One	M80 Moosa
2020	Thatteem Mutteem	Mazhavil Manorama	Dr.Moidu(Cameo)
