= Manikandan Pattambi =

Indian television, stage, and film actor

- Occupation: Actor
- Years active: 2000–present
- Known for: Marimayam (Television series)
- Children: 2

Manikandan Pattambi is an Indian television, stage, and film actor. He's best known for his roles in Malayalam television. He became famous for his character Sathyasheelan in the sitcom Marimayam, a social satire in Mazhavil Manorama. He has also acted in a few supporting roles in various Malayalam films.

== Personal life ==
He is married and has two daughters.

== Awards ==
- 2000: Kerala Sangeetha Nataka Academy Award for Best Actor - Uyirthudi
- 2003: Kerala State Television Award for Best Supporting Character - Devamanasam (Short film)
- 2009: Kerala State Television Award for Best Actor - Unaru (Short film)
- 2011: Kerala State Television Award for Best Comedian - Marimayam

== Television ==
Year	Program	Channel	Role	Notes
2010-2013	Chakkarabharani	Surya TV		
2011–Present	Marimayam	Mazhavil Manorama	Sathyasheelan	
2015	Nirupama Fans	Flowers	Manoharan	
2016	Bhasi & Bahadoor	Mazhavil Manorama	Bhasi	
2016	Grand Kerala Circus	Media One	MLA	
2017–2018	Aliyan vs Aliyan	Amrita TV	Kanakan	
2019-2021	3 Kutties	Amrita TV	Vasutty	
2021	Madhavi Nadu Vaneedum Kalam	Kaumudy TV	Venu	Telefilm
2022-2023	wife is beautiful	Zee Keralam	Ananthan	

== Filmography ==
=== As an actor ===
Year	Title	Role	Notes
2000	Mankolangal		
2002	Meesa Madhavan	Man at Vedi Vazhipadu counter	
2003	Manassinakkare	Benny's friend	
2003	Pattalam		
2003	Uthara		
2004	Rasikan	Shivankutty's friend	
2005	Achuvinte Amma		
2005	Naran	Satheeshan	
2006	Achanurangatha Veedu	Maniyappan	
2006	Chakkaramuthu	Shivanandan	
2007	Mission 90 Days		
2007	Pramukhan		
2007	Arabikkatha		
2007	Atheetham		
2007	Thakarachenda	Suni	
2008	Chithrasalabhangalude Veedu		
2009	Passenger	Minister's assistant	
2009	Dr. Patient		
2009	Kerala Cafe		Segment: "Puramkazhchakal"
2009	Evidam Swargamanu	Davis	
2009	Boomi Malayalam		
2010	Paappi Appacha	Thomas	
2010	Malarvaadi Arts Club	CPM member	
2010	Best Actor		
2011	Manikyakkallu	Gopalan	
2011	Swapna Sanchari		
2011	The Metro		
2011	Sankaranum Mohananum		
2012	Vaadhyar		
2012	Ee Adutha Kaalathu	Swami	
2012	Chapters		
2012	Orange		
2012	Nidra		
2012	Thappana	C.Pavithran/ C.P	
2012	Oru Yathrayil		
2013	Celluloid		
2013	101 Chodyangal		
2013	Ithu Manthramo Thantramo Kuthantramo?		
2013	SIM	Seetharama Iyer	
2013	Blackberry	Balan	
2013	Kaliyachan		
2013	Vallatha Pahayan	Balachandran	
2014	Odum Raja Adum Rani		
2014	Amma Thottil		
2014	Ellam Chettante Ishtam Pole	Govindhan Kutty	
2015	Ammakkoru Tharattu		
2015	The Reporter	Sasidharan	
2017	Naval Enna Jewel		
2017	Kadam Kadha		
2018	Pretham 2	Mani Uncle	
2018	Njan Marykutty		
2019	Rameshan Oru Peralla	Rameshan	
2019	Janamaithri	Head constable Lawrence	
2020	Sufiyum Sujatayum	Kumaran	
2022	Super Sharanya	Vasudevan	
2022	Keedam	Kuttettan	
2022	Mukundan Unni Associates	Mani	
2023	Anuragam	Ravi	
2023	Bhagavan Dasante Ramarajyam		
2024	Panchayath Jetty	Vallabhan	Also Co-Director
2024	Manorathangal	Kumaran Mash	Segment: Silalikhitham
2024	Bharathanatyam	Velichappadu Sudheer	
2025	Written & Directed by God		

=== Dialogue ===
- Vallatha Pahayan (2013)

=== Screenplay ===
- mankolangal(2000)
- Odum Raja Aadum Rani (2015)

=== Story ===
- Man Kolangal (2000).
