= Ellam Chettante Ishtam Pole =

- Directed by: Haridas
- Written by: Haneefa Ambadi
- Produced by: Dr Sudhakaran Nair
- Starring: Manikandan Pattambi; Kalinga Sasi; Sunil Sukhada; Hareesh Perumanna
- Cinematography: Vipin Mohan
- Music by: Yoonasco
- Release date: 2015
- Country: India
- Language: Malayalam

Ellam Chettante Ishtam Pole is a 2015 Indian Malayalam-language film directed by Haridas, featuring Manikandan Pattambi, Charulatha, Sasi Kalinga and Sunil Sugatha, It was produced by Dr Sudhakaran Nair and scripted by Haneefa Ambadi.

== Cast ==
- Manikandan Pattambi as Govindhan Kutty
- Sunil sukhadha as Veluthambi
- Kalinga Sasi
- Balachandran Chullikkadu
- Siddharth Shiva
- E.A Rajendran
- Hareesh Perumanna
- Master Vivas
- Vijyan Karanthoor
- Charulatha
- Sona Heiden
- Lakshmi Sharma
- Soniya
- Yamini Bhaskar
- Manka Mahesh
- Manju
- Sandra Shekhar
- Manjusha Sajish
