= Sasi Kalinga =

Indian actor (died 2020)

- Born: V. Chandrakumar; Kunnamangalam, Kerala, India
- Died: 7 April 2020; Kozhikode
- Education: Kerala Government Polytechnic College
- Occupation: Actor
- Years active: 2002 – 2020
- Spouse: Prabhavathi
- Children: Amrutha Anoop & Aishwarya C Kumar

V. Chandrakumar, better known by his stage name Sasi Kalinga, was an Indian actor who worked in Malayalam cinema. He acted in Paleri Manikyam: Oru Pathirakolapathakathinte Katha (2009), Pranchiyettan & the Saint (2010), Indian Rupee (2011), Adaminte Makan Abu (2011), and in Amen (2013).

== Personal life ==
Sasi Kalinga received his primary education at St. Joseph's Boys' Higher Secondary School, and earned a diploma in automobile engineering from Kerala Government Polytechnic College, Kozhikode. He was married to Prabhavathi. He have two children—Amrutha Anoop and Aishwarya C. Kumar He died on 7 April 2020 in a private hospital in Kozhikode.

== Filmography ==
Year	Title	Role	Notes
2021	Deadline		Posthumously released
2021	Pidikittapulli		
2019	Kuttymama	Tea Shop Owner	
2019	Arayakadavil		
2017	Oru Cinemakkaran	Chacko	
2017	Munthirivallikal Thalirkkumbol	Shivan	
2016	Pulimurugan	Balan	
2016	Kasaba	Linguswamy	
2016	Hallelooya	Outha	
2015	Vidooshakan		
2015	Thilothama		
2015	Amar Akbar Anthony	Ramanan	
2015	Loham	Stranger	
2015	Utopiayile Rajavu	Murari	
2015	Jilebi	Kumarettan	
2015	Njan Samvidhanam Cheyyum		
2015	Ellam Chettante Ishtam Pole		
2015	32aam Adhyayam 23aam Vaakyam	Narayanan	
2015	Oru Second Class Yathra	Koshi	
2015	The Reporter		
2015	Perariyathavar	Band Master	
2014	Karanavar		
2014	Homely Meals		
2014	Vellimoonga	Ammavan	
2014	Naku Penta Naku Taka		
2014	Money Ratnam	Karim	
2014	Koothara	Sulaiman	
2014	Ulsaha Committee	Kadavil Basan	
2013	Green Apple		
2013	Philips and the Monkey Pen	Moorthy	
2013	Nadan		
2013	Idukki Gold	Dead Body	
2013	Sringaravelan	Govindan Nair	
2013	Vallatha Pahayan		
2013	Amen	Chathappan	
2013	Rebecca Uthup Kizhakkemala		
2013	Isaac Newton S/O Philipose		
2013	Paisa Paisa	Aalikka	
2013	August Club		
2012	The Hitlist		
2012	Mullamottum Munthiricharum		
2012	The Reporter		
2012	Madirasi		
2012	Karmayodha		
2012	Matinee		
2012	Bhoopadathil Illatha Oridam		
2012	Jawan of Vellimala		
2011	Snehadaram		
2011	Adaminte Makan Abu	Kabeer	
2011	Janapriyan		
2011	Track		
2011	Indian Rupee		
2011	Snehaveedu		
2011	Manikyakkallu	Sashi	
2011	Three Kings	Sabu	
2011	Khaddama	Chand Baadha	
2010	Pranchiyettan & the Saint	Eyyappan	
2010	Penpattanam		
2010	Pokkiri Raja	Rakesh Tiwari	
2010	Pithavum Kanyakayum		
2009	Janthu		
2009	Paleri Manikyam: Oru Pathirakolapathakathinte Katha	DYSP Mohandas Manalath	
2009	Kerala Cafe		"Makal" Episode
