= Jeevan Gopal =

Indian actor

- Born: 26 April 1997 (age 29); Kollam, Kerala, India
- Other name: Master Jeevan
- Education: B.A. in English literature
- Occupation: Actor
- Years active: 2006–present

Jeevan Gopal (born 26 April 1997), also known as Master Jeevan, is an Indian film and television actor who appears in Malayalam industry. He is best known for playing Jeem-boom-ba in Alavudinte Albutha Vilakku.

He started his career as a child artist in Malayalam films and serials. He played the protagonist, Mahesh in 2018 soap opera serial Makkal, aired in Mazhavil Manorama. He is currently playing pivotal roles in Surya TV's Kaliveedu and Zee Keralam's Kudumbashree Sharada.

== Early life ==
Jeevan was born on 26 April 1997 on Kollam district of Kerala. He holds a B.A. degree in English literature.

== Filmography ==
=== Films ===
Year	Film	Role	Notes	Ref.
2010	Mummy & Me	Joekuttan Joseph		
2010	Pokkiri Raja	Young Surya		
2011	Mohabbath	Sajna's brother		
2012	My Boss	Rahul		
2012	Meow Meow Karimpoocha			
2013	Proprietors: Kammath & Kammath	Young Gopi		
2017	Georgettan's Pooram	Jose Vadakkan		
2017	Oru Visheshapetta Biriyani Kissa	Abdu		
2018	Angane Njanum Premichu	Aruvi		

=== Television ===
Year(s)	Show	Role	Channel	Notes	Ref.
	Anantham		DD Malayalam		
2008	Sreemahabhagavatham		Asianet		
2009	Devi Mahatmyam	Dathan	Asianet		
2010	Kunjali Marakkar	Thacholi	Asianet		
2011–2012	Alavudinte Albutha Vilakku	Jeem-boom-ba	Asianet		
2012–2013	Amma	Deepu	Asianet		
2012	Munch dance dance	Contestant	Asianet		
2013	Panjagni		Kairali TV		
2014	Njangal Santhushtaranu	Vinayan	Asianet Plus		
2015	Junior Chanakyan		Flowers TV		
2016	Karyam Nissaram		Kairali TV		
2016	Mangalyapattu	Arjun	Mazhavil Manorama		
2017	Sakudumbam Shyamala	Sugunan	Flowers TV		
2018	Makkal	Mahesh	Mazhavil Manorama		
2019	Kudumba Kodathi	Motu	Kairali TV		
2019–2021	Kasthooriman	Shiva	Asianet		
2020–2023	Abhi Weds Mahi	Abhi	Asianet Cable Vision/ Comx TV		
2020	Mukundetta Sumithra Vilikunnu	Abhi	Comx TV	Cameo appearance	
2021	Kudumbavilakku	Jithin Raj	Asianet		
2021–2024	Kaliveedu	Akhil	Surya TV		
2022–2026	Kudumbashree Sharada	Prof. Rajeev Ranganath	Zee Keralam		
2022–2023	Dancing Stars	Contestant	Asianet		
2023–2025	Ladies Room	Pavi	Kaumudy TV		
2024–present	Chempaneer Poovu	Roshan	Asianet		
2024–2026	Mangalyam Thantunanena	Pravav	Surya TV		
2025	Bigg Boss 7	Guest	Asianet		
2025–2026	Happy Couples	Jayesh	Asianet		
2026–present	Dance Dhamaka	Contestant	Flowers TV		

=== Webseries ===
Year	Title	Role	Platform	Notes	Ref.
2022–2023	Abhi N Mahi	Abhi	YouTube		
2022	OJO Kanmani	Pavithran (Pavi)	YouTube		
2023	Radio gramam 2.0	Manu	Saina play		
2024–present	Abhiyum Mahiyum	Abhi	YouTube		
