= Gold coins (disambiguation) =

Gold coins are coins made mostly or entirely of gold, except in New Zealand and Australia, where the term often refers to $1 and $2 coins, which are gold-coloured.

Gold coin or gold coins may also refer to:

- Gold Coins (film), a 2017 Indian Malayalam-language feature film
- Gold Coins, a song by Charli XCX from the album Sucker
