= Mridula Vijay =

Indian actress

- Born: Sreelakshmi; Thiruvananthapuram, Kerala, India
- Occupation: Actress
- Years active: 2014–present
- Spouse: Yuva Krishna (m. 2021)
- Children: Dhwani(br.2022)
- Parent(s): Vijaikumar and Rani Vijaikumar
- Relatives: Parvathy Vijai (sister)

Mridula Vijay is an Indian actress who predominantly works in the Malayalam television industry as well as in a few Tamil films.

== Early life ==
Mridula was born as Sreelakshmi to Vijaikumar and Rani Vijaikumar. She later changed her name to Mridula and is settled in Thiruvananthapuram, Kerala. She has a younger sister, Parvathy, who is also a television actress.

== Personal life ==
Mridula got engaged to television actor Yuva Krishna on 23 December 2020. The couple married on 8 July 2021 at Attukal Temple, Thiruvananthapuram. They have a daughter named Dhwani Krishna, born in 2022.

== Career ==
In 2015, she made her television debut with Kalyanasougandhikam on Asianet, and later, her popularity increased with the series Krishnathulasi on Mazhavil Manorama. Mridula replaced Sonu Satheesh Kumar in the series Bharya, portraying the character Rohini.

== Television ==
=== Serials ===
Year	Title	Role	Channel	Notes	Ref.
2015–2016	Kalyana Sougandhikam	Arya	Asianet		
2016–2017	Krishnathulasi	Krishna	Mazhavil Manorama		
2015	Manjurukum Kalam		Mazhavil Manorama		
2017–2019	Bharya	Rohini	Asianet	Replaced Sonu Satheesh Kumar	
2019–2021	Pookkalam Varavayi	Samyuktha	Zee Keralam		
2019	Sumangali Bhava	Samyuktha	Zee Keralam	Cameo in promo	
2020	Kaiyethum Doorath	Samyuktha	Zee Keralam	Cameo in promo	
2021	Manam Pole Mangalyam	Samyuktha	Zee Keralam	Guest appearance	
2021	Mrs. Hitler	Samyuktha	Zee Keralam	Cameo in promo	
2021–2022	Thumbapoo	Veena	Mazhavil Manorama	Replaced by Niyuktha Prasad	
2023	Rani Raja	Anamika / Aami	Mazhavil Manorama	Replaced Archana Kavi	
2024–2026	Ishtam Mathram	Ishitha	Asianet		
2025	Premapooja		Surya TV		
2025	Pavithram	Dr Ishitha	Asianet	Extended cameo	
2026	Sithara	Seetha	Flowers TV	Replaced by Ranjitha Mukundan	

=== Reality shows ===
Year	Show	Role	Channel	Notes	Ref.
2020	Suryajodi No. 1	Contestant	Surya TV	Pair with R. Vishwa	
2026- present	Bigg Boss 8	Contestant	Asianet		

==== Special appearances ====
Year	Title	Role	Channel	Notes
2018	Comedy Stars	Herself	Asianet	Guest appearance
