= Rini Raj =

Indian television actress (born 1999)

- Born: Rini Raj; November 1999 (age 26); Kollam, Kerala, India
- Occupation: Actress
- Years active: 2011–present

Rini Raj (born November 1999) is an Indian film and television actress who predominantly works in the Malayalam industry. She is well known for her role as Balachandrika in the Malayalam soap opera Karuthamuthu.

== Career ==
Rini started her acting career at the age of 12. She starred in a music video, Orma when she was a grade 7 student. She played the second female lead in the 2014 Malayalam film Maramkothi. She played the protagonist, Myna in the soap opera Mangalyapattu aired in Mazhavil Manorama. She played one of the three female leads in 2017 film Smart Boys. She rose into fame playing Balachandrika in Karuthamuthu. She played a supporting role in Kasthooriman. She then played the female lead Abhirami in Thamarathumbi. She is currently part of celebrity game show Star Magic.

== Filmography ==
=== Films ===
Year	Film	Role	Language	Notes	Ref.
2014	Maramkothi	Anima	Malayalam		
2016	Smart Boys	Radhika	Malayalam		
2016	Ottakolam	Saranya	Malayalam		
2016	Yaamam	Neena	Malayalam	Short film	
2016	Nizhal		Tamil		
2016	Pattai Kalappu	Radhika	Tamil		
2018	Kalpitham	Bhadra	Malayalam	Short film	
2024	Kudumba Sthreeyum Kunjadum	Gopalakrishnan's wife	Malayalam		

=== Television ===
Year	Film	Role	Channel	Notes	Ref.
2016-2017	Mangalyapattu	Myna	Mazhavil Manorama		
2017-2019	Karuthamuthu	Balachandrika	Asianet		
2019-2020	Thamarathumbi	Abhirami	Surya TV		
2020-2021	Kasthooriman	Urmila	Asianet		
2020–2022	Star Magic	Contestant	Flowers TV		
2022-2023	Thumbapoo	Sanjana	Mazhavil Manorama		
2023-2024	Mazhayethum Mumpe	Anamika	Amrita TV		
2023-2024	Parvathy	Gargi	Zee Keralam		

==== Special appearances ====
Year	Film	Role	Channel	Notes	Ref.
2016	Onnum Onnum Moonu	Guest	Mazhavil Manorama		
2016	Pularvela	Guest	Manorama News		
2018	Sell me the answer	Participant	Asianet		
2018	Urvashi Theatures	Participant	Asianet		
2019	Comedy Stars	Guest	Asianet		
2021	Red Carpet	Contestant	Amrita TV		
