= East Coast Vijayan =

Film Producer, Director&lyricist

- Born: Karikkathil Vasudevan Pillai Surendran Pillai; Malamel, Kollam, Kerala, India
- Occupations: Lyricist; Producer; Director; Businessman
- Parents: Vasudevan Pillai; Devaki Amma
- Website: eastcoastvijayan.in

East Coast Vijayan is an Indian film producer, director and lyricist who works in Malayalam film industry. Being a lyricist, Vijayan wrote the music album Ninakkai, which was released in 1998. The music was given by Balabhaskar and the song Ninakkay Thozhi Punarjanikkam was sung by Biju Narayanan.

In 1999, Vijayan came up with his second album in the Ninakkai series named Aadhyamai, composed by Balabhaskar and penned by Vijayan. In 2001, East Coast came up with Ormakkai. The song "Ormakkai Iniyoru Snehageetham" from the album was composed by M. Jayachandran, written by Vijayan and sung by K. J. Yesudas and K. S. Chithra.

In 2008, Vijayan directed and produced his first movie, Novel. In 2011, he directed and produced his second movie, Mohabbath. In 2012, he produced his third movie, My Boss.

Vijayan released Veendum on Valentine's Day 2025.

== Albums ==
- Ninakkai (1998)
- Aadymai (1999)
- Ormakkai (2001)
- Swantham (2002)
- Campus (2002)
- Iniyennum (2004)
- Ennennum (2009)
- Veendum (2025)

== Filmography ==
Year	Film	Director	Producer	Story	Lyricist
2008	Novel	Yes	Yes	Yes	Yes
2011	Mohabbath	Yes	Yes	No	No
2012	My Boss	No	Yes	No	Yes
2015	Jilebi	No	Yes	No	Yes
2019	Chila New Gen Nattu Visheshangal	Yes	Yes	No	Yes
2023	Kallanum Bhagavathiyum	Yes	Yes	No	No
2024	Chithini	Yes	Yes	No	Yes
2026	Bhishmar	Yes	Yes	No	No
