= Tessa Joseph =

Indian actress

- Born: 7 march Manimala, Kottayam, India
- Occupations: Actress, model
- Years active: 2001-2003, 2015-2017, 2021-Present

Tessa Joseph is an Indian model-turned-actress who works in Malayalam films and television. She made her acting debut in 2003 with Pattalam.

== Early and personal life ==
Born to M.K George and Achimma, Tessa attended St. Antony's Public School & Junior College, Anakkal, Kanjirappally. She finished her early education at Mater Dei in New Delhi and finished her college education at St. Teresa's college, Cochin.

== Career ==
She made her debut as a heroine opposite Mammootty, in the movie Pattalam (2003). She hosted the TV show Hello Good Evening in Kairali TV, and did TV shows and commercials. She returned to the movie industry in 2015, playing the role of a journalist in Njan Samvidhanam Cheyyum. Then she played Rajamma in Rajamma @ Yahoo. She played the role of an advocate, Anu G. Nair, in Marupadi (2016) and Sujatha, a mother of two main characters, in the movie Goldcoins (2017).

== Filmography ==
=== Films ===
Year	Title	Role	Notes	Ref.
2003	Pattalam	Vimala	Debut film	
2015	Njan Samvidhanam Cheyyum	Shabana		
2015	Rajamma @ Yahoo	Rajamma		
2016	Marupadi	Adv. Anu G. Nair		
2017	Gold Coin	Sujatha		
2024	Thalavan	Anagha		
2025	Sahasam	Gayathri Ganesh		
2026	Pathira Kurukkan †	TBA		

=== Television ===
Year	Title	Role	Channel	Notes	Ref.
2001-2003	Hello Good evening	Host	Kairali TV	Talk show	
2004	Golden Couple Quizzy Time	Host	Asianet	Game show	
2016	Comedy Super Nite 2	Guest	Flowers TV		
2021-2022	Ente Kuttikalude Achan	Anupama	Mazhavil Manorama	TV series	
2021	Atham Pathu Ruchi	Celebrity Presenter	Mazhavil Manorama	Cooking show	
2022	Red Carpet	Mentor	Amrita TV	Reality show	
2023-2024	Chakkappazham 2	Lalitha Kunjunni	flowers TV	TV series	
