= Sangeetha Mohan =

Indian Malayalam actress from Kerala

- Born: Thiruvananthapuram, Kerala, India
- Occupations: Actress, script writer
- Parent(s): Gopi Mohan (father), Jayakumari Mohan (mother)

Sangeetha Mohan is an Indian film and TV actress active in the Malayalam language. She is well known for performing many television soap characters and later turned out to be one of the most sought-after script writer in Malayalam television.

== Biography ==
Sangeetha Mohan was born in Trivandrum, Kerala. She was born as the youngest daughter to Gopi Mohan and Mrs. Jayakumari. Her father was a senior accountant in KSRTC, and her mother was an additional secretary in Kerala Public Service Commission. She has an elder sister, Saritha Mohan, who is an officer in agriculture department.

== Acting career ==
She and her sister Saritha Mohan appeared in an advertisement of Kilimark Umbrella. She made her full-time acting debut in a Malayalam television serial Saumini which was aired on Doordarshan. She too worked as a television host (anchor) in several celebrity events and TV shows. Sangeetha also served as a story writer in a Malayalam serial Vasthavam. Sangeetha has acted in some popular Malayalam television serials such as Saumini, Jwalayayi and Dhathuputhri. She last acted in a Malayalam film titled Kaviyude Osyath which was released in 2017.

== Television credits ==
Serials (partial)

Year	Serial	Channel	Notes
1998	Banjare	DD Malayalam	
1998-2000	Sthree	Asianet	
1999	Samayam	Asianet	
1999	Shyamambaram	DD Malayalam	
2000	Unarthupattu	DD Malayalam	debut
2000	Jwalayayi	DD Malayalam	as Sophy
2000	The Beach	Asianet	
2000	Mohanam	Doordarshan	
2000	Parvanendu		
2001	Saumini	DD Malayalam	
2001	Daivathin Makkal	Surya TV	
2002	Manasaputhri	Surya TV	
2002	Sparsham	Asianet	
2003	Chechiyamma	Asianet	
2004-2006	Suryaputhri	Asianet	
2005	MT Kadhakal	Amrita TV	
2006	Veendum Jwalayayi	DD Malayalam	
2006	Swantham Suryaputhri	Asianet	
2006	Nombarapoovu	Asianet	
2007	Chandrodayam	DD Malayalam	as Yamuna
2007	Sreekrishna Leela	Asianet	
2007	Santhwanam		
2007	Snehathooval	Asianet	promo ad only
2007	Aa Amma	Kairali TV	
2008	Hello Kuttichathan	Asianet	
2008	Devimahathmyam	Asianet	
2008	Sree Mahabhagavatham	Asianet	
2008	Vishudha Thomasleeha	Asianet	
2009	Bhamini Tholkkarilla	Asianet	
2009	Vigraham	Asianet	
2010	Ponnum Poovum	Amrita TV	
2010	Aakashathe Pole Bhoomiyilum	Atmeeyayathra TV	
2010	Alaudinte Albutha Vilakku	Asianet	
2011	Sooryakanthi	Jaihind TV	
2012	Butterflies	Surya TV	
2012	Chakravakam	Surya TV	
2012	Sreepadmanabham	Amrita TV	
2012	Vasthavam	Kairali TV	story, screenplay, dialogue, voice
2013	Penmanassu	Surya TV	
2015	Dhathuputhri	Mazhavil Manorama	as Vijaynirmala
2016	Athmasakhi	Mazhavil Manorama	story, screenplay, dialogue, promo acting
2018	Seetha Kalyanam	Asianet	screenplay, dialogue
2019	Krithyam	Kairali TV	voice
2020	Kudumbavilakku	Asianet	screenplay, dialogue
2019	Baakiyalakshmi	Star Vijay	screenplay, dialogue
2020	Kaatrukkenna Veli	Star Vijay	screenplay, dialogue for the first 80 episodes
2020	Swantham Sujatha	Surya TV	story, screenplay, dialogue
2021	Namma Veetu Ponnu	Star Vijay	screenplay, dialogue
2021	Kana Kanmani	Surya TV	dialogue
2021	Thumbapoo	Mazhavil Manorama	promo anchor, dialogue, screenplay
2023–2025	Aaha Kalyanam	Star Vijay	Screenplay, dialogue
2026-present	Pranayavilasam	Zee Keralam	Screenplay, dialogue

== Filmography ==
Year	Title	Role
2001	Saivar Thirumeni	Sreekutty
2001	Jeevan Masai	Vanu's wife
2002	Nammal	—N/a; Voice for Aparna (Renuka)
2005	Neelakannulla Paava	
2006	Off Beat	Anniemma
2006	Mamma	Jennifer
	Azhangahalil Amritaham	
	Vyazhavattom	
	Diya	Lekha
2008	Sound of Boot	Compere
2011	St. George	Angel's mother
2012	The Nail	Maya
2013	Lisammayude Veedu	Treesa
2013	Radio	Swetha's sister
2015	Thinkal Muthal Velli Vare	Herself in a small cameo
2015	Mili	Roopa
2017	Kaviyude Osyath	Padma

== TV shows ==
- Soundarya'Prada'
- Old Gems
- Ladies Only
- Veettamma
- Navarasam
- Tharotsavam
- Nakshathradeepangal
- Onnum Onnum Moonnu
- Koottukkari
- Oh My God
- Dream Drive
- Coat Eeswaran
- Comedy Festival
- Sindooram
- Gulumal
- Sarigama
- Vellotturuli
- Don't Do
- Uthrada Rathri
- Malayali Durbar
- Sreekandan Nair Show
- Humorous Talk Show
- Nammal Thammil
- Comedy Stars
- Smart Show
- Atham Pathu Ruchi
- Flowers Oru Kodi

== Albums ==
- Radhamadhavam
- Namo Namah Sree

== See also ==
- Malayalam cinema
- List of Indian film actresses
