= Krishnathulasi =

- Krishnathulasi Title card
- Also known as: Krishna Thulasi, Krishnatulasi
- Genre: Drama
- Written by: Joyce
- Story by: Joyce
- Directed by: Shiju Aroor
- Starring: See below
- Country of origin: India
- Original language: Malayalam
- No. of seasons: 1
- No. of episodes: 295

Production
- Producer: Sree Movies Unnithan
- Production location: Kerala
- Cinematography: Anurag Guna
- Editors: Ajay Prasannan and Aneesh Unnithan
- Production company: Rohini Visions

Original release
- Network: Mazhavil Manorama
- Release: 22 February 2016 – 13 April 2017

Related
- Sthreepadham

Krishnathulasi (ml; കൃഷ്ണതുളസി) was an Indian television series which ran from 22 February 2016 to 13 April 2017 on Mazhavil Manorama channel. It starred, Mridula Vijay as the main protagonist. The show took the time-slot at 9:30 PM and was later shifted to prime time 7:00 PM.

== Plot ==
The story is all about two sisters, Krishna and Tulasi who are bonded with lovely sisterhood. Tulasi, a blind teenage girl who loves her sister and claims that her sister is her eye, meanwhile Krishna, the elder, cares about her 2 members family since the death of their parents and support her younger sister in all the social and psychological issues she faces as only because she is blind. These two sisters lives in the seashore and creates a lovely siblings-triangle drama.

The story is written by the famous novel writer Joyce who also contributed two more television series to Mazhavil Manorama.

== Cast ==
- Mridula Vijay as Krishna/Muthumani [Main Female Lead]
- Anila Sreekumar as Vijayalakshmi [Female Lead] (died in serial)
- Roslin as Appachi
- Subhash Nair as Karthikeyan [Main Male Lead]
- Muhammed Rafi as Ashokan [Male Lead]
- Anil Mohan as Maheendhran
- Firosh as Rajendran
- Adithyan Jayan as Jithendran
- Jayan as Vasavan [Antagonist]
- Valsala Menon as Madhavi Amma
- Umadevi Nair/Sabitha as Bhama
- Lekshmi Priya / Ambili Devi as Thara
- Indulekha as Srikutty
- Sumi Santhosh as Jayasree
- Yathikumar as Achutha Kurup
- Akhina Shibu as Ramya
- Parvathy
- Vanchiyoor Praveenkumar as Shanmughan
- Ashraf Pezhumoodu as DYSP
- Dini Daniel as Chithralekha
- Thara Kalyan as Paappamma
- Ruby as Kasthoori
- Anumol
- Abhijit
- Ramesh Valiyassala as Gopikrishnan
- Dickson Sydney Ebenezer as Madhavan
- Adarsh as Rahul
- Akhil Anand
- Arya sreeram
- Yavanika Gopalakrishnan as Ramachandran
- Rageesh Raja Edupadikkal
- Anjusha as Thulasi [Krishna's blind sister] (died)
- Mahesh Lakshman as Gireesh (died)
