= Ambili Devi =

South Indian actress

- Born: Chavara, Kollam, Kerala, India
- Occupations: Actor; Anchor
- Years active: 1996 – Present
- Spouses: S. Loval (m. 2009; div. 2018); Adithyan Jayan (m. 2019; div. 2021)
- Parent(s): Balachandra Pillai; Maheswari Amma

Ambili Devi is an actress from Kerala, India. She won the Kerala State Television Award for Best Actress in 2005.

== Acting career ==
She started as a young Malayalam serial artist and got her break with the serial Samayam. Later, she entered the movie industry after she became 'Kalathilakam' in the Kerala State School Youth Festival in 2001. Her notable role in Malayalam was Meerayude Dukhavum Muthuvinte Swapnavum, where she played Meera the disabled sister of the protogonist, Muthu played by Prithvi Raj.

== Personal life ==
Ambili is the daughter of Balachandran Pillai and Maheswari Amma of Gigi Bhavan at Chavara, Kottamkulangara near Kollam district. She has an elder sister Anjali Devi. She had her education from vidyarambham nursery school, Government vocational higher secondary school kottamkulangara, Govt HSS Chavara. She pursued BA literature from Fatima Mata National College, Kollam. She gained a diploma and MA in Bharathanatyam from Kalai Kaviri College of Finearts, Trichy.

Ambili was first married to film-serial cameraman Lovel, hailing from Thiruvananthapuram on 27 March 2009 at Kollam Bank Auditorium and the couple has a son, Amarnath born on 27 January 2013. However, The couple got divorced in 2018. She got married for the second time to serial actor Adithyan Jayan on 25 January 2019. They have a son born on 20 November 2019. However, Adithyan and Ambili got divorced on 2021.

She is a trained dancer in Bharatanyatyam, Kuchipudi, Mohiniyattam and Folk dance. She runs a dance school, named Nrityodaya School of Dance and Music.

== Filmography ==
Year	Film	Role	Language	Notes
2000	Sahayathrikakku Snehapoorvam	Saji's sister	Malayalam	
2003	Meerayude Dukhavum Muthuvinte Swapnavum	Meera	Malayalam	Critics Award & National Film Academy Award
2003	Hariharan Pillai Happy Aanu	Latha	Malayalam	
2003	Ente Ammakku	Anuradha	Malayalam	Short movie
2004	Vishwa Thulasi	Young Thulasi	Tamil	
2005	Kalyana Kurimanam	Kollus	Malayalam	
2016	Chodhyam	Stranger	Malayalam	Short movie
2018	Amma Karayaruthu	Young mother	Malayalam	Short movie
2018	Neer	Neha's mother	Malayalam	Short movie
TBA	Thalavara	-	Malayalam	Short movie

== Television serials ==
Year	Serial	Channel	Notes
1996 1998	Thaazhvarappakshikal(Children's Serial)	Doordarshan	Child artist
1996 1998	Akshayapathram	Asianet	Child artist
1999	Samayam	Asianet	as Thulasi
2001	Innale	Asianet	Anju Aravind daughter
2000	Sthree	Asianet	as Devu
2000-2001	Alakal	Doordarshan	as Thara
2000-2001	Jwalayayi	DD Malayalam	as Raziya
2001	Sthreejanmam	Surya TV	as Ajitha
2002	Jalamohini		
2002	Vasundhara Medicals	Asianet	
	Midhunam	Asianet	
	Pettamma	DD Malayalam	as Krishna Priya
	Pradakshinam	DD Malayalam	
	Sugandhi	DD Malayalam	
2002-2003	Akkarapacha	Asianet	
2002	Chakkaravava	Surya TV	as Minakshi
2004	Sthree Janmam	Surya TV	
2004	Mizhi Thurakkumbol	Surya TV	
2004-2005	Pavithra Bandham	Asianet	
2005	Amma	Amrita TV	Won, Kerala State Television Award-Best Actress
2005	Kayamkulam Kochunni	Surya TV	as Kochalu
2006	Sagaram	DD Malayalam	as Maya
2006	Vikramadithyan	Asianet	as Kumari
2006	Kalyani	Surya TV	as Meera
2006-2007	Sthree 2	Asianet	as Devu
2007	Mounanombaram	Kairali TV	
2007	Velankani Mathavu	Surya TV	Won Madhyamaratna award for Best Actress
2008	Manassariyathe	Surya TV	
2008	Sreeguruvayoorappan	Surya TV	
2008	Shrikrishnaleela	Asianet	
2008-2010	Snehathooval	Asianet	as Anjali
2008-2010	Sree Maha Bhagavatham	Asianet	as Sathyabhama
2009	Kadamattathachan	Surya TV	as Mollykutty
2009	Ente Alphonsamma	Asianet	
2010	Adiparasakthi Chottanikkarayamma	Surya TV	as Devi bhaktha
2011	Devi Mahatmyam	Asianet	
2011	Veera Marthanda Varma	Surya TV	as Thanka
2011-2012	Paattukalude Paattu	Surya TV	as Varsha
2014-2015	Njangal Santhushtarannu	Asianet Plus	as Shalini
2014-2015	Ente Pennu	Mazhavil Manorama	as Meera
2015	Sreekrishnavijayam	Janam TV	
2015	Kalyani Kalavani	Asianet Plus	as Rani
2016	Sathyam Sivam Sundaram	Amrita TV	
2016	Sagaram Sakshi	Surya TV	as Sivakami
2016-2017	Krishnathulasi	Mazhavil Manorama	Replaced Lekshmipriya as Thara
2016	Amme Mahamaye	Surya TV	
2017– 2019	Sthreepadham	Mazhavil Manorama	Replaced by Indulekha S as Preethi
2017– 2019	Seetha	Flowers	as Janaki
2019	Sabarimala Swami Ayyappan	Asianet	Replaced by Arathi Ajith as Lakshmi Devi
2021– 2023	Thumbapoo	Mazhavil Manorama	as Maya
2022 - 2024	Kanalpoovu	Surya TV	as Kaveri Parameshwaran
2022	Manassinakkare	Surya TV	as Herself in 350th episode promo
2024–present	Akale	Zee Keralam	as Padmavati

== Albums ==
- Fathima Beevi
- Sulthan
- Sree Bhadrakali
- Manathe Ambili
- Kairali Sravanam
- Amme Kaithozham
- Mrithyunjayam
- Ponmaninadham
- Moovanthipottu
- Kairali Sravanam
- Kodungallur Punya Darshanam
- Hara Hara Shambo
- Devi Kripa
- Chakkulathu Punya Darsanam
- Devimalarukal
- Kadampuzha Punya Darsanam

== TV shows ==
As a host

- Fresh'n'Hits (Kairali TV)
- Shoot and show (Kairali TV)
- Nalla Paatukkal (Doordarshan)
- Shubharathri (Jeevan TV)
- Hridayaragam (Asianet Plus)
- Dance Dance (Asianet Plus)
- Sindooram (Surya TV)
- Ambili's World (YouTube)

Other shows

- Madhuram Shobhanam
- Oruchiri Iruchiri Bumperchiri Aaghosham
- Urvashi Theaters
- Laughing Villa
- JB Junction
- Fast Track
- Super Challenge
- Saphalameeyathra
- Don't Do Don't Do
- Annies Kitchen
- Asianet News
- Manassiloru Mazhavillu
- Onnum Onnum Moonnu
- Ruchimelam
- Tamaar Padaar
- Chat with Star
- Marunadan Malayali
- Malayali Life
- Lal Salam
- December Mist
- Aram + Aram = Kinnaram - promo
- FAQ
- Day with a Star
- Thararasakoottu
- Athithikkoppam
- Swapnaveedu
- Manoramaonline Celebrity Chats
- Manoramaonline Astrology
- Flowers Award Nite
- Onam Vanne Ponnonam Vanne
- Marhaba
