= Malamakkavu Ayyappa Temple =

Hindu temple in Kerala, India

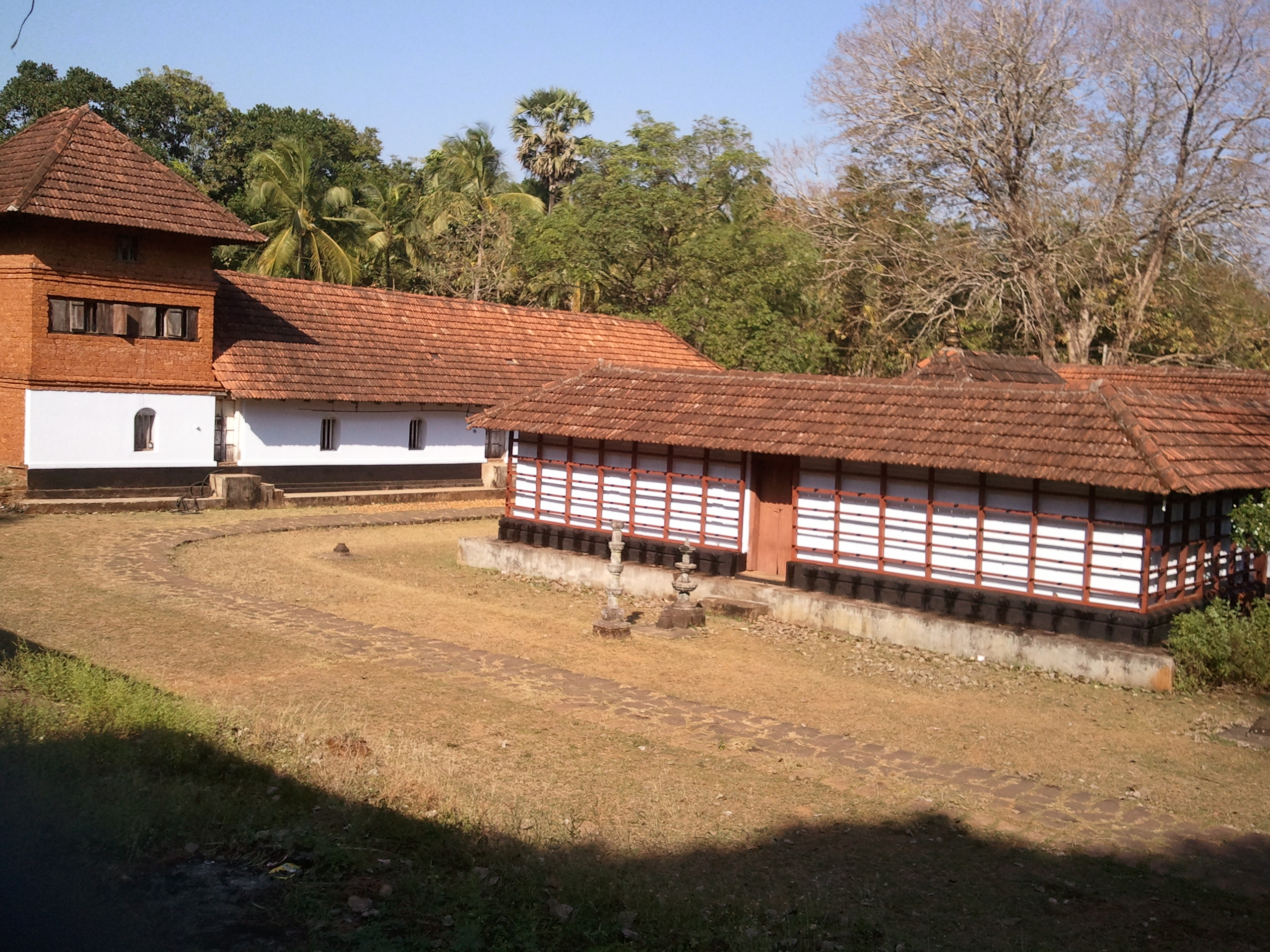

- Location in Kerala

Religion
- Affiliation: Hinduism
- District: Palakkadu
- Deity: Ayyappan

Location
- Location: Koodallur
- State: Kerala
- Country: India
- Interactive map of Malamakkavu Ayyappa Temple
- Coordinates: 10.8185°N 76.0790°E

Architecture
- Type: Traditional Kerala style

Malamakkavu Ayyappa Temple is a famous Hindu temple dedicated to lord Ayyappan, located in Anakkara Panchayath in Palakkad district of Kerala. A special flower called "Chengazhinir Poovu" which is traditionally used as offering to deity is found and grown only in the temple pond. This temple was depicted in the Malayalam movie Neelathamera, though the film was recorded elsewhere as no permission was given to shoot the film on the temple premises.

== Name ==
Temple name is variously spelled as 'Mala-Mel-Kavu', 'Mala-Mal-kavu' or 'Mala-yil-Kavu'. They all mean "A temple (Kavu) located on top (Mel) of a small hill(Mala)". All spellings are correct, but the second one of these is used in the official temple sign board.

== Location ==
The temple is located in Malamakkavu Desom. But the temple is not, as the name suggests, situated on top of a hill, but is located relatively lower in the region. This area is famous for its Thayambaka, a traditional percussion music instrument used in temple festivals.

== Legend of establishment ==
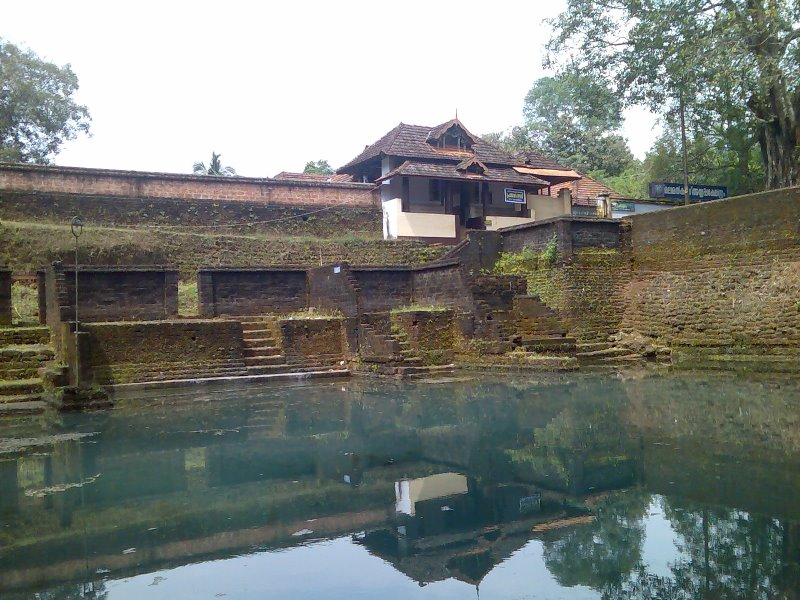
View of Malamakkavu Ayyappa Temple and temple pond, facing west

The legend, which the temple shares with many other temples across Kerala is that, many hundreds of years ago a Cherumi couple chanced upon a divine rock while grazing the forest with their live-stock. The rock bled blood upon being struck with a sickle and thus its divinity was made apparent to all. Soon word went around of the discovery of a divine entity in the forest and the deity was formally instated in a specially made sanctum. A small temple (Kavu) was established around the idol. Not much historic records exist to authenticate the antiquity of the temple, but written records exist which prove that the temple is more than 300 years old.

== Temple and its surroundings ==
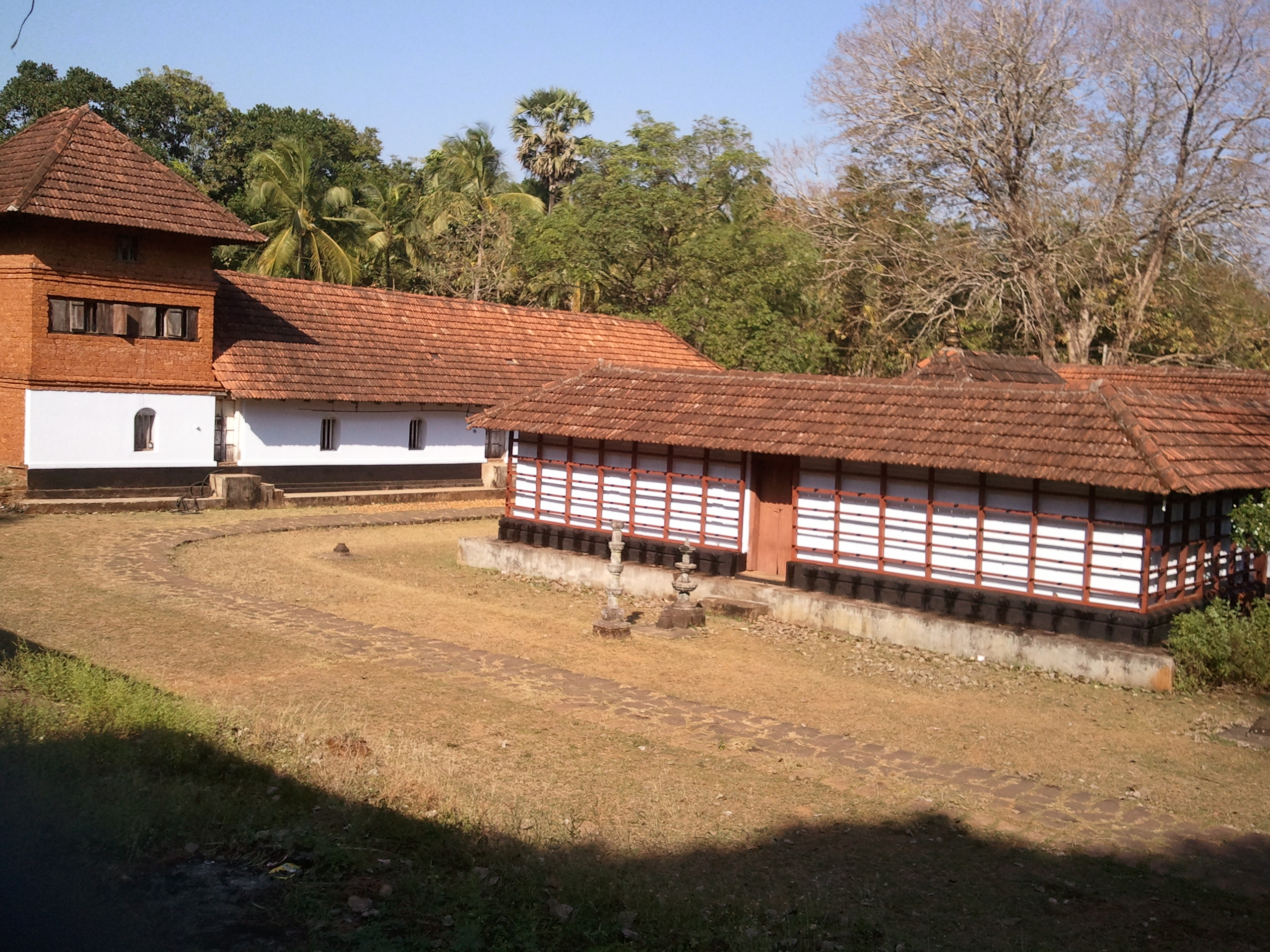
View of temple facing east

The temple is one of the 108 Ayyappan temples in Kerala. Its main idol, Ayyappan is oriented to the east so that offerings can be made. Other idols are Bhagavathi and Lord Siva. The temple's festival, "Thalapoli" is celebrated on the last Saturday of the month of Dhanu. The temple is owned and managed by the Zamindar family of Padinjarepat Nambiar clan. Temple pond is situated to the east of the premises.

Legends say that, if one prays with full heart and places offerings at the feet of the lord Ayyappa, the "Chengazhi Neer" flower, also known as "Neelathamara", will bloom the very next day in the temple pond as a sign of God's blessing. This legend associated with Malamakkavu Ayyappa temple plays a pivotal role in the film Neelathamara. Thiyattu Nambiars, who has the right to conduct the Thiyattu ceremony in Ayappan temples has a branch in Malamakkavu, where they live in the vicinity of Malamakkavu Temple.

Famous writer and Jnanpith award winner, M T Vasudevan Nair was born in Koodallur and did his primary schooling from Malamakkavu UP School. He is the author of the story based on which the movie "Neelathamara" is conceived. Through M T's writing, this quiet hamlet has found fame in Kerala's literary imagination.

== See also ==
- Temples of Kerala
