= Poojitha Menon =

Indian film actress, television personality, anchor

- Occupations: Actress; television personality; anchor
- Years active: 2012–present

Poojitha Menon is an Indian actress, television personality and anchor. Known for roles in Malayalam film and television industry.

== Early life ==
Poojitha Menon was born and brought up in Kuwait. She did her schooling in Thrissur and then Pursued her degree from GRD and NIFT Bangalore.

== Career ==
Poojitha Menon made her Malayalam film debut in Nee Ko Njaa Cha after she has established herself as a model and television personality.

== Filmography ==
Year	Title	Role	Notes
2013	Nee Ko Njaa Cha	Ann Mathews	
2013	Arikil Oraal	Taara	
2014	Ohm Shanthi Oshaana	Julie Chechi	
2014	Maramkothi	Priyamvadha	
2014	Konthayum Poonoolum	Ann	
2015	Loka Samastha	Gayatri	
2015	St Mary'sile Kolapathakam	Veena	
2016	Appuram Bengal Ippuram Thiruvathamkoor	Shilpa	
2016	Swarna Kaduva	Deepthi	
2017	Clint	Mrs. Mohanan	
2019	Neeyum Njanum	Chithra Prasad	
2019	Children's Park	Rishi's sister	
2019	Akshitha	Akshitha	Tele-film
2022	Ormakalil	Reshmi	
2022	Ullasam	Receptionist	
2026	Spa	Sweety	
2026	Maduramee Jeevitham	TBA	

== Television ==
=== As host ===
- Innathe Cinema (Mazhavil Manorama)
- 5 Sundarikal (Mazhavil Manorama)
- Valentine's Corner(We TV)
- Super Star the Ultimate ( Amrita TV)
- Page 3 ( Kappa TV)
- Tharapadham Chethoharam (Asianet Plus)
- Super challenge ( Surya TV)
- Dream Home (Rosebowl)
- A day with the Star (Kaumudy TV)
- Oh My God - (Kaumudy TV)
- Celebrity Cricket League (Surya TV)
- Festival with Joy Alukkas (Asianet)
- Dare The Fear : extra time (Asianet)
- Cinema Diary (Asianet)
- Valentine's Diary (YouTube)
- Onathumbi
- Onam Samam Payasam
- Unnikkoppam

As Contestant

- Dare The Fear (Asianet)
- Thakarppan Comedy (Mazhavil Manorama)
- Boeing Boeing (Zee Keralam)

As Mentor

- Red Carpet (Amrita TV)
- top singer Season 2(Flowers)

TV series

- Ente Kuttikalude Achan (Mazhavil Manorama) as Sangeetha
- Rani Raja ( Mazhavil Manorama) as Priyamvatha
