= Pattalam (2003 film) =

- Directed by: Lal Jose
- Written by: Reji Nair
- Produced by: Maha Subair; Sudhish
- Starring: Mammootty; Biju Menon
- Cinematography: S. Kumar
- Edited by: Ranjan Abraham
- Music by: Vidyasagar
- Distributed by: Kalasangham Films
- Release date: 12 September 2003
- Country: India
- Language: Malayalam
- Budget: ₹3 crore

Pattalam (transl. Army) is a 2003 Malayalam-language film by Lal Jose and starring Mammootty and Biju Menon along with Tessa, Jyothirmayi, Jagathy Sreekumar, Oduvil Unnikrishnan and Innocent in supporting roles. The film revolves around incidents in a small village after the army sets up a temporary camp.

== Synopsis ==
An Army unit comes to a local village in Kerala because of a terror threat. The unit is led by Major Pattabhiraman and his subordinate, Captain Benny. The Major sees a widow named Vimala singing. Vimala is living in her husband's home after his death. A village girl Satyabhama, and Benny fall in love and elope. Pattabhiraman discovers that a terrorist has planned to pour cyanide into a water tank. He finds the terrorist and destroys the water tank by blasting a bomb terrorist had with him. Benny reveals to Vimala that Pattabhiraman killed her husband Nandu in the war. The Major admits the fact, but claims he did it as a mercy killing because Nandu was so badly injured. Vimala forgives him, and the couple happily unites.

== Cast ==
- Mammootty as Major Pattabhiraman
- Biju Menon as Captain Benny
- Jyothirmayi as Bhama
- Tessa Joseph as Vimala
- Kalabhavan Mani as Moidu Pilakkandi, Panchayat Member
- Salim Kumar as S.I. Gabbar Kesavan
- Innocent as Sivasankaran Nair (Father of Bhama)
- Jagathy Sreekumar as Kumaran
- Indrajith Sukumaran as Captain Nandakumar
- Tini Tom as Krishnanutty, soldier
- Mala Aravindan as Ex-military Gopalan
- Oduvil Unnikrishnan as Narayanan
- Mamukkoya as Hamsa, Tea shop owner
- Joju George as Sajan, soldier
- Sai Kumar as Vishwanathan
- Sudheesh as Suku
- Sukumari as Pattabhiraman's Mother
- Zeenath as Kumaran's wife
- Ambika Mohan as Bhama's mother
- Bindu Panicker as Panchayat President Sulochana
- James as Prabhakaran, Sulochana's husband
- Indrans as Govindan
- Manikandan Pattambi as Sakhavu
- Major Ravi as Captain Peter
- Captain Raju as Colonel Kannappan
- Dinesh Prabhakar as Barber
- Idavela Babu as Panickar
- Sudheer Sukumaran as Terrorist

== Soundtrack ==
Lyrics: Gireesh Puthenchery, Music: Vidyasagar. Bits of the song "Aaroral" were used by Vidyasagar himself in the song "Konjam Neram" from Chandramukhi (2005).

Song title	Singers
"Aaroral"	K. J. Yesudas, Sujatha Mohan
"Aalilekkavile"	P. Jayachandran, Sujatha Mohan
"Aaroral"	Sujatha Mohan
"Dingiripattalam"	Alen Sunny Stephen, Kalyani
"Pamba Ganapathi"	M. G. Sreekumar
"Vennakallin"	Biju Narayanan, Radhika Thilak, Vidhu Prathap
"Anthimanam"	Biju Narayanan, Preetha
"Theme Music"	Instrumental
