= Thumbapoo =

Indian Malayalam television soap opera

- Genre: Soap opera
- Written by: Sharmila V Sharmi
- Screenplay by: Sangeetha Mohan
- Directed by: Dileep Tavanur
- Starring: Mridula Vijay
- Country of origin: India
- Original language: Malayalam
- No. of seasons: 1
- No. of episodes: 399

Production
- Producer: Umadharan Kayamkulam
- Camera setup: Multi-camera
- Running time: 20–25 minutes
- Production company: Souparnika Creations

Original release
- Network: Mazhavil Manorama
- Release: 18 October 2021 – 17 February 2023

Thumbapoo is an Indian Malayalam-language soap opera written by Sharmila V Sharmi and scripted by Sangeetha Mohan. The show premiered on 18 October 2021 on Mazhavil Manorama. It stars Mridula Vijay, Niyuktha Prasad and Sachin SG in lead roles along with Remya Sudha, Julie Hendry and Amritha in pivotal roles. All episodes of this show is streaming on Manorama Max.

== Cast ==
=== Lead roles ===
- Mridula Vijay / Niyuktha Prasad as Adv. Veena Ramakrishnan.
  - Megha Mahesh as Young Veena
- Sachin SG as Rameshan. Childhood friend and husband of Veena.

=== Pivotal roles ===
- Remya Sudha as Soudamini. Wife of Ramakrishnan. Mother of Veena and Vidya.
- Julie Hendry as Vidya. Younger sister of Veena.
- Amritha
- Rini Raj as Sanjana
- Ambili Devi as Maya
- Rudra Prathap as Adv. Sivasankaran
- Kunchan as Ramakrishnan. Father of Veena and Vidya.
- VK Baiju as Sreekumar. Husband of Renuka.
- Sangeetha Rajendran as Rema, the eldest sister of Rameshan.
- Keerthi Krishna as Renuka. One of the two elder sisters of Rameshan.
- Nayana Josan as Reena, Rameshans and, Maya's Daughter
- Kiran Dev as Johnny, an employee at KSEB. Close friend of Rameshan.
- Ramya Salim
- Amith as Soman Kartha. Owner of Alpha Builders. Husband of Geetha. Father of Jishnu (born to his wife Geetha) and Swathi (born to his former lover Sugandhi). Former lover of Sugandhi.
- Aneesh Kailas as Aneesh Kumar, Architect of Alpha Builders
- Deepa Jayan as Malu
- Reshma R Nair as Neenu.
- Rajesh Hebbar as the owner of Corba Gelatin.
- Abees Raj as Adv. Mannadiar

=== Cameo appearances ===
- Rimi Tomy as Herself
- Yuva Krishna as Manu (in Promotional video)

== Production ==
Lead actress Mridula Vijay withdrew from the show due to pregnancy.
