= Makkal (TV series) =

- Opening still
- മക്കൾ
- Genre: Family Drama; Romance
- Created by: Royal Entertainments
- Screenplay by: Kunjunni
- Story by: Ajay Ghosh
- Directed by: Faisal Adimali
- Starring: See below
- Composers: Mohan Sithara; Lyrics; Deepa
- Country of origin: India
- Original language: Malayalam
- No. of episodes: 119

Production
- Cinematography: Sunil Vechoor
- Editor: Giri Shankar
- Camera setup: Multi-camera
- Running time: 22 minutes

Original release
- Network: Mazhavil Manorama
- Release: 25 June – 7 December 2018

Related
- Ammuvinte Amma; Mahashakthiman Hanuman

Makkal (ml; മക്കൾ) (English: Children) is a 2018 Indian Malayalam television series directed by Faisal Adimali. The show premiered on Mazhavil Manorama channel on Mondays to Fridays at 7:30 PM and later shifted to 7:00 PM due to poor TRP ratings.

== Plot ==
The show revolves around the love, affection and ignorance between an elderly couple and their children. The kind of life they lead despite having their own children is a major factor in the story.

== Cast ==
Lead Cast

- Dinesh Panicker as Madhavan
- Fathima Babu / Shobha Mohan as Saraswathi
- Jeevan Gopal as Mahesh a.k.a. Mahi

Supporting Cast

- Hari Nambotha as Anandhu
- Seetha lakshmi as Babitha
- Saritha B Nair as Sunanda
- Shobi Thilakan as Paramu
- Rudra Pradap as Prasanna Kumar
- Sandra Babu as Devika
- Reena Basheer/ Shemi Martin as Maya
- Rekha Krishnappa as Mythili
- Rajesh Hebbar as Devan
- Boban Alummoodan as Jayaraj
- Nivas Ravi as Ajith
- Shehana as Nayana
- Krishnaprasad as Gopan
- Kalyan Khanna as Anandhu
- Ranjith Raj as Raj
- Deepan Murali as Senthil
- Thirumala Ramachandran as Bhadran
- Sunitha as Subbu
- Romel Rajesh as Kevin
- Varsha
- Archana Menon
- Shobi Thilakan
- Aiswarya Devi

Guest Appearance

- Lal Jose as Himself (episode 1)
