= Dhathuputhri =

- Also known as: Dathuputhri
- Genre: Drama
- Directed by: AM Nazeer
- Starring: See below
- Music by: Shyam Dharman
- Country of origin: India
- Original language: Malayalam
- No. of episodes: 157

Production
- Producer: Haridas AK Kottulli
- Editor: Pradeep Bhavat
- Camera setup: Multi-camera
- Running time: 22 minutes approx
- Production companies: Unit Media Vision; Kingini Productions

Original release
- Network: Mazhavil Manorama
- Release: 2 February – 11 September 2015

Dhathuputhri (transl: Adoptive Daughter) is a Malayalam language soap opera which premiered on Mazhavil Manorama channel, starring Swasika Vijay as the main protagonist.

== Plot summary ==
The story of Dathuputhri revolves around a village girl named Kanmani. She is the lone survivor of a landslide and gets adopted by the State government. She reaches the family of Nandakishore (District Collector), and Hema, who had lost their daughter. The further reappearance of their lost girl, Meenu makes things take an abrupt turn. The story goes into a different track when a girl is reluctant to share the honours and privileges that she had been enjoying once in her homestead and society, with her monozygotic sister.

== Cast ==
- Swasika Vijay as Kanmani/Meenu
- Meena Kumari as Hema
- Risabava as Nandakishore
- Girish Nambiar as Chetan Rai
- G.K.Pillai as Grandfather
- Sangeetha Mohan as Vijaynirmala
- Beena Antony as Kanchana
- Bindhu Ramakrishnan as Thankachi Amma
- Adityan Jayan as Sathyan
- Ambarish as SreeKuttan
- Girish Nambiar as Chethan Rai IAS
- Kollam Thulasi as Minister
- Ambika Mohan as Vasundhara
- Darshana Das as Radhika
- Tony
- Sneha Nambiar
- Reena
