= Sejo John =

- Born: 9 May 1983 (age 42); Athirappilly, Thrissur, Kerala, India
- Genres: film songs, soundtrack
- Occupations: Singer, composer, record producer, music director, instrumentalist
- Instruments: Keyboard, veena, Harmonium, Guitar
- Years active: 2009–present
- Website: SEJO JOHN

Sejo John is an Indian music composer, singer and instrumentalist. He works in Malayalam cinema and his songs have appeared in films like Mummy & Me, My Boss and Memories.

== Early life ==
Sejo John born and grew up in Athirappilly, located in Thrissur district of Kerala. After completing B.A.Music from Maharaja's College Cochin, he started his career as a music director by working in several Christian devotional albums. He spent one year in Dubai as a music tutor before venturing into film.

== Career ==
Before entering into films, Sejo has composed music for numerous Christian devotional albums like 'Way to Cross', 'Creator', 'Karthavu' etc. and to a number of short films like 'Bandwagon', 'Koottukari' and 'Zero Waste 100 Mark' etc. Among his Christian devotional albums, 'Karthavu' gained wide acceptance. As a music director, Sejo had associated with veteran singers like M.G.Sreekumar and K.S.Chitra. It was film director K.Biju, director of Doctor Love, who introduced Sejo to Jithu Joseph. Jithu Joseph offered him the opportunity to compose songs for his next movie. Thus he did his debut film as a music director. That movie was Mummy & Me, directed by Jithu Joseph and released in the year 2010. His second venture is My Boss released in the year 2012., directed by Jithu Joseph again. Music of 'My Boss' have got much popularity and it topped the chart list for several weeks. The movie was also a superhit. Singers like Karthik, KS Chithra, Rahul Nambiar, Benny Dayal, Sayanora Philip, Rimi Tomy sung for Sejo's Compositions in various movies. Sejo John's upcoming projects are Sir CP, and Dafedar.

== Filmography ==
Year	Film	Language
2010	Mummy & Me	Malayalam
2012	My Boss	Malayalam
2013	6B Paradise	Malayalam
2013	Housefull	Malayalam
2013	Manja	Malayalam
2013	Memories	Malayalam
2014	Sir C.P	Malayalam
2023	Vaathil	Malayalam

== Short film ==
Film	Year	Language
2013	Tatvamasi	Silent
