= Ente Kuttikalude Achan =

Indian soap opera

- എൻ്റെ കുട്ടികളുടെ അച്ഛൻ
- Genre: Indian soap opera Drama
- Created by: Balaji Telefilms
- Developed by: Suresh Krissna
- Screenplay by: Socrates K. Valath
- Story by: Sonali Jaffar; Latheesh C V
- Directed by: Purushothaman V Antony Antony
- Country of origin: India
- Original language: Malayalam
- No. of seasons: 1
- No. of episodes: 245

Production
- Executive producer: K.V. Shabarreesh
- Producer: Suresh Krissna
- Production locations: Kochi, India
- Cinematography: Pradeesh Nenmara
- Editor: Ratish Mohan
- Camera setup: Multi-camera
- Running time: Approx. 24 minutes
- Production company: Suresh Krishna Production Pvt Ltd.

Original release
- Network: Mazhavil Manorama
- Release: 29 March 2021 – 26 March 2022

Related
- Jeevitha Nouka (TV series)

Ente Kuttikalude Achan (English: Father of my children) is an Indian soap opera that premiered on 29 March 2021 on Mazhavil Manorama and streams on Manorama Max. The show stars Tessa Joseph and Kiran Nambiar as the protagonists, and Poojitha Menon as the antagonist and is directed by Purushothaman V. This show is a remake of Ekta Kapoor's Kya Hua Tera Vaada.

== Plot ==
The plot revolves around the life of Ashok, Anupama and their three kids who live happily. Things take a turn as relationship as Ashok's ex-girlfriend Sangeetha Raj joins his company as a new manager. Later, Ashok moves in with Sangeetha and files for a divorce against Anupama.

== Cast ==
=== Main ===
- Tessa Joseph as Anupama: Ashok Narayanan's former wife who later legally divorces him. After Ashok starts living together with Sangeetha, and Anupama divorces Ashok, Anupama gets engaged to Vineeth upon Ashok's father Narayanan's insistence. Anupama and Vineeth develop mutual respect. Later Vineeth declares before Ashok's family that he is unwilling to marry Anupama in the present scenario.
- Shyam Jacob as Vineeth: Sangeeta Raj's friend. Vineet is a widower who loves his wife even after her demise. A few days after Anupama divorces Ashok Narayanan, Ashok's father Narayanan has a heart attack and is taken to hospital. On the same day Narayanan requests Vineeth to marry Anupama. Vineeth agrees and gets engaged to Anupama. After Ashok Narayanan goes missing, Vineeth and Anupama finds out that Sangeetha has committed the crime of impersonation and Sangeetha is the legally wedded wife of Devan. After finding out these facts, Vineeth tells Ashok's family that he is unwilling to marry Anupama in the present scenario.
- Kiran Nambiar as Ashok Narayanan: Anupama's former husband who later legally divorces her. Ashok Narayanan is the father of Anikha, Abhirami, Anju and Aromal. Even before divorcing Anupama, Ashok Narayanan starts a living together relationship with his boss Sangeetha Raj who was also his ex-girlfriend in college. Ashok Narayanan does not legally marry Sangeetha Raj. Later killed by Sangeetha.
- Poojitha Menon as Sangeetha Raj: Ashok Narayanan's sweetheart in college who later becomes his boss. The legally wedded first husband of Sangeetha is Devan. Sangeetha and Ashok has a daughter Anika, who was conceived when Sangeetha and Ashok were in college. Sangeetha wishes to legally marry Ashok Narayanan and later kills him when he learns that she is the legally wedded wife of Devan. Sangeetha decides to kill her legally wedded first husband Devan, but Devan escapes unhurt. The second husband of Sangeetha is Bhadran Pillai, a wealthy Indian settled in Australia. Sangeetha marries Bhadran Pillai, many years after the murder of Ashok.

=== Recurring ===
- Shobha Priya Nair as Kamalamma: Ashok Narayanan's mother, Anupama's mother-in-law and Narayanan's wife
- Evelynn Mary Joseph (episodes 1-193) / Haritha Nair (Episode 194-) as Abhirami Ashok: Ashok and Anupama's eldest daughter. Vikram's wife
- Sona Sunil (episodes 1-193) / Riya Thomas (Episode 194-) as Anju Ashok: Ashok and Anupama's second daughter
- Aidan Ali (episodes 1-193) / Givin Simon (Episode 194-) as Aromal Ashok: Ashok and Anupama's son
- Sini Varghese as Sareena Riyaz: The wife of Riyaz, neighbour of Anupama and Ashok
- Prasanth Kanjiramattam as Riyaz: Ashok Narayanan's close friend, colleague and neighbor
- Shivadas as Narayanan: Ashok Narayanan's father
- Boban Alummoodan as Madhan, uncle of Vikram Pratap. Owner of Mirror News.
- Sidhi Vinayak / Rohith S Warrier as Vishnu: Ashok's younger brother
- Devasurya as Sabita: Vishnu's wife
- Aleena as Neena: Ashok Narayanan's youngest sister
- Rhea George as Radhikadevi: Sangeetha's mother
- Lijo Lonappan as Devan: The legally wedded first husband of Sangeetha Raj. Devan had not committed any crimes prior to his marriage with Sangeetha. After working for a company in the United States of America, Devan moved to Kolkotta and worked in the Kolkotta branch of the same company, for some years. Devan had legally married Sangeetha, when Devan and Sangeetha Raj were colleagues in Kolkotta. After that Devan was accused of financial embezzlement of the media company's funds, sentenced to imprisonment and dismissed from his job. That was his first crime. After this incident Sangeetha left Devan without legally divorcing Devan. After Devan left prison, he visits Sangeetha asking for rupees fifty lakhs which had been given to Sangeetha by Devan before Devan's imprisonment. Despite learning that Sangeetha and Ashok were planning to marry, Devan does not harm Ashok. Sangeetha decides to kill Devan, but Devan escapes unhurt.
- Nazar Latheef as Bhadran Pillai: Sangeetha Raj's second husband. He is a wealthy Indian Malayali settled in Australia. He marries Sangeetha, many years after the death of Ashok.
- Surjith Purohit as Ajay
- Aswathy as Anikha: The daughter of Ashok Narayanan and Sangeetha Raj.
- Rohit Menon as Vikram Pratap: Anikha's fiancé. Colleague of Abhirami and Yogi. Abhirami's husband
- Thrissur Elsy as Vikram's grandmother

=== Other ===
- Vishnu Pillai as Prashanth: Raghu's son and Neena's former boyfriend
- Anand Damodar as Raghu: Narayanan's former friend
- Revathi Roopesh
- Ajay Gopinath
- Shaji Mohammad
- Sumesh Thampi
- Manu Martin Pallippadan as Naveen
- Sunitha as Sujatha: Anupama's mother
- Teena Linson as Nayana Deepak: Anupama's cousin
- _______ as Sheela: Anupama's aunt
- Veena Syam as Nissa: Naveen's girlfriend in college
- Jiffin George as Smitha: Naveen's fiancée
- Deepika Mohan as School Headmistress
- Kottayam Rashid as Baburaj: A novelist and womaniser
- Hari Menon as Jeevan Lal: A prospective bridegroom of first Neena and then Anupama (who was living separately from Ashok Narayanan at that time.)
- Gowri Sharad as Nimisha: The sister of Vineeth's sister Vismaya's husband. Nimisha was the widow of Mohandas. Nimisha is an advocate by profession. After the death of her husband Mohandas, Nimisha develops a liking for Vineeth's personality and wishes to marry Vineeth.
- ____ as Sunitha, a Circle Inspector of police, who tries to arrest Devan.
- ____ as Rafi, a policeman who tries to arrest Devan.
- Kiran Raj as the Circle Inspector of Police, who successfully investigates the man missing case and later the murder case of Ashok Narayan, and arrests Sangeetha Raj.
