= Mangalyapattu =

- Genre: Drama
- Written by: S.K.Sabeena
- Directed by: Faizal Adimali
- Country of origin: India
- Original language: Malayalam
- No. of seasons: 1
- No. of episodes: 120

Production
- Producers: Keerthy & Vishnu
- Production company: Travancore Advertisers

Original release
- Network: Mazhavil Manorama
- Release: 19 September 2016 – 3 March 2017

Related
- Malootty; Karnan

Mangalyapattu is an Indian television series which launched on Mazhavil Manorama channel by 19 September 2016.

The series airs from Monday to Friday at 8 P.M IST. Mangalyapattu is a story of a village girl, Myna, whose family relied on weaving for their livelihood. The story sheds light on the struggles, hardships and dreams of a mediocre weaver family and also brings out the flamboyance of the competitive textile industry. It completed 120 episodes and was replaced by dubbed version of Suryaputra Karn.

== Plot ==
Myna is the sole bread-winner of the family of four, consisting of her father Achuthan, her two siblings Abhirami and Kannan and her grandmother. Being the eldest of the three, Myna took upon her young shoulders the burden of the family. She is working as a sales girl at a leading textile shop in the city. The story unfolds when Achu decide to takeup the order to weave a 'Mangalyapattu' worth five lakh.

== Trivia ==
This was the last serial of Malayalam actor Jagannatha Varma, who died on 20 December 2016, during the shooting of the serial. He played the role of Rajan Kartha.

== Cast ==
- Rini Raj as Maina
- Rudra Pratap as Achuthan
- Sona Nair as Chandana Shetty / Lakshmi
- Charmila / Gayathri Lakshmi as Menaka
- Dileep Shankar as Mohan Kartha
- Akshara .S.P as Rubi
- Jagannatha Varma as Rajan Kartha
- Richard N. J. as Renjith Kartha
- Ranjith Raj as Denny Mathew
- Manu Varma as Mathachan
- Jameela Malik as Achuthan's mother
- Master Arjun as Kannan
- Arya Sreeram as Hema
- Mini as Radha chechi
- Seena as Sony
- Renjini as Sulu
- Jeevan Gopal as Arjun
- Meenakshy as Mini chechi
- Baby Neelima as Chinnu
- Feroz Aftab as Pisharady mashu
- Reji Nair as Sabu Mashu
- Thirumala Ramachandran as Velayudan
- Vijayan as Chandrettan
- Ajay Sankar
- Muhammed Shahin
- Gireesh Kumar as Doctor
- Noorin Shereef as Abhirami
- Breshnev Syam as Thankamuthu
