= Archana Kavi =

Indian actress

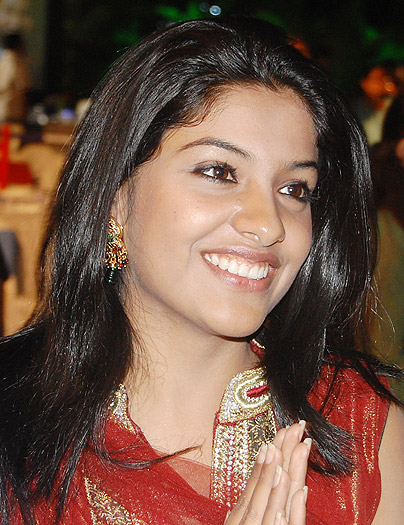
- Archana in 2010
- Born: Archana Jose Kavi; 4 January 1990 (age 36); New Delhi, India
- Occupations: Actor; YouTuber
- Years active: 2009–2016; 2025–2026
- Spouse: Abish Mathew (m. 2015; div. 2021) Rick Varghese (m. 2025)

Archana Jose Kavi (born 4 January 1990) is an Indian actress, YouTuber and a television host. She made her acting debut in film Neelathaamara (2009) scripted by M. T. Vasudevan Nair and directed by Lal Jose.

== Early life ==
Archana was born on 4 January 1990 in New Delhi to Jose Kaviyil, a senior journalist, and Rosamma. Jose Kaviyil's family is from Kudiyanmala in Kannur district, Kerala. She was raised in Delhi and studied at St. Xavier's School, Delhi. In 2006, Archana moved to Ramapuram in Kerala for a Bachelor of Business Administration course at the Mar Augusthinose College. She stated that she came from a "typical Malayali middle-class family and acting was never considered a profession by us". She said that she wanted to be a journalist initially since her father was one and later wanted to be an RJ but that people discouraged her.

Archana applied for an internship at the television channel Yes Indiavision and assisted in the production of certain programmes. After a year, she anchored the show Bloody Love on the same channel, while she was spotted by director Lal Jose, who offered her the lead female role in his film in March 2009.

== Career ==
She made her cinematic debut in 2009 with the highly successful Neelathaamara, portraying the role of Kunjimalu, a maid in an old Nair Tharavadu (ancestral home) who falls for the young master of the house. Director Lal Jose said that "Archana has an in-born talent". Her role won critical accolades. In her next venture titled Mummy & Me, which narrated the tale of the tumultuous relationship between a modern-day teenager and her mother, she played the lead role of a teenager named Jewel. Archana stated the character Jewel was "so very like the real me". But her following release Best of Luck where she reunited with her Neelathamara co-stars Kailash and Rima Kallingal, failed to make an impact at the box office. She made her Tamil debut in the period film Aravaan in which she played a tribal character named Chimby.

In 2013 she also made her Telugu debut in Backbench Student. Archana stated that she played "a college girl caught in a sweet love tale" in the film. She acted as the lead in Abhiyum Njanum, in which she played a modern girl from Mumbai, who comes to Kerala in search of her fiancé. In Honey Bee she played a naïve Anglo-Indian girl Sara. She played a supporting role as the hero Karthik's best friend in Pattam Pole. Her next films Bangles in which she played a junior artiste, and Nadodimannan in which she played a doctor, both released on the same day.

She has signed her second Tamil film Gnana Kirukkan. She is shooting for Day-Night opposite Maqbool Salmaan. She has acted as a Muslim girl in the film Mazhavillinattam Vare, which is Kaithapram's directorial debut. She will also be seen in Nemam Pushparaj's upcoming film Kukkiliyar, in which she plays Manoj K Jayan's daughter who plays a 75-year-old. Archana also shot for a Hindi film Saroja, an offbeat film directed by Anjali Shukla, playing the role of a commercial sex worker.

She anchored Sundari Neeyum Sundaran Njaanum, a reality show for television actors on Asianet. She maintains a Twitter account. In 2010 she was only one of two Malayalam actresses maintaining an active Twitter account. In 2021, she moved to direction with a web series titled Pandaraparambil House at 801.

Archana also owns a boutique named 'Chaaya' in Kochi, Kerala.

== Personal life ==
Archana Kavi was engaged to standup comedian Abish Mathew on 31 October 2015. They were married on 23 January 2016 in Vallarpadam Church, Kerala. The marriage function was attended by Rima Kallingal, Aashiq Abu and Abish's friends from Delhi and comedians like Kenny Sebastian, Kaneez Surka, Rohan Joshi and Kanan Gill. In 2021, the couple filed for divorce.

Archana married Rick Varghese in October 2025. The two met on a dating app and decided to take their relationship to the next level.

== Filmography ==
=== Films ===
| Year | Title | Role | Language | Notes |
|---|---|---|---|---|
| 2009 | Neelathaamara | Kunjimalu | Malayalam | |
| 2010 | Mummy & Me | Jewel | Malayalam | |
| 2010 | Best of Luck | Neethu | Malayalam | |
| 2011 | Salt N' Pepper | Pooja Nair | Malayalam | Cameo appearance |
| 2012 | Spanish Masala | Lillykkutty | Malayalam | Cameo appearance |
| 2012 | Aravaan | Chimitti | Tamil | |
| 2012 | Mazhavillinattam Vare | Rabiya | Malayalam | |
| 2013 | Backbench Student | Priyanka | Telugu | |
| 2013 | Abhiyum Njanum | Abirami | Malayalam | |
| 2013 | Honey Bee | Sara | Malayalam | |
| 2013 | Pattam Pole | Sherin | Malayalam | |
| 2013 | Bangles | Angel | Malayalam | |
| 2013 | Nadodimannan | Aathira | Malayalam | |
| 2014 | To Noora with Love | Sreeparvathi | Malayalam | |
| 2014 | Day Night Game | Abhirami | Malayalam | |
| 2014 | Monayi Angane Aanayi | Merin | Malayalam | |
| 2014 | Gnana Kirukkan | Sumathi | Tamil | |
| 2015 | Sughamaayirikkatte | Ramla | Malayalam | |
| 2015 | Kukkiliyar | Sarayu | Malayalam | |
| 2016 | Dooram | Rasiya | Malayalam | |
| 2025 | Identity | Dr. Devika Shankar | Malayalam | |

== Other works ==
Television

| Year | Title | Role | Notes |
|---|---|---|---|
| 2008 | Bloody Love | Host | |
| 2008 | Himamazhayil | Archana | Music Album |
| 2010 | Ente Priya Ganangal | Host | |
| 2013 | Sundari Neeyum Sundaran Njaanum | Host | Reality Show |
| 2022–2023 | Rani Raja | Anamika/Aami | TV series on Mazhavil Manorama; Replaced by Mridula Vijay |

Web series

| Year | Title | Role | Notes |
|---|---|---|---|
| 2016 | Talk With Archie | Host | Vlog |
| 2016–2017 | Travel | Host | Vlog |
| 2017 | Toofan Mail | Ammu | Web Series; Writer also |
| 2018 | Big Talks | Host | Web Series |
| 2019 | Meenaviyal | Amrita | Web Series |
| 2020 | Bae Control | Vedhika | Web Series |
| 2020–2022 | Talk With Archie Season 2 | Host | Vlog |
| 2020–2022 | Zoomling Talks / QnA | Host | Vlog |
| 2021–2022 | Pandaraparambil House | Director/Producer | Web Series |
| 2023–present | Pursuit of madness | Host | vlog |
