= Bangles (film) =

- Theatrical release poster
- Directed by: Dr. Suvid Wilson
- Screenplay by: Shyam Menon
- Story by: Dr. Suvid Wilson
- Produced by: Dipti Biju Unni
- Starring: Ajmal Ameer; Poonam Kaur; Archana Kavi; Thilakan
- Cinematography: Dileep Raman
- Edited by: Don Max
- Music by: Dr. Suvid Wilson
- Production company: Citadel Cinema
- Distributed by: Citadel Cinema
- Release date: 18 October 2013
- Running time: 118 minutes
- Country: India
- Language: Malayalam

Bangles is a 2013 Indian Malayalam-language thriller film written by Shyam Menon and directed by debutant Dr. Suvid Wilson who also composed the songs, starring Ajmal Ameer, Poonam Kaur and Archana Kavi. The film was produced by Dipti B Unni under the banner of Citadel Cinemas. The cinematography was handled by Dileep Raman and editing by Don Max.

The film is about a murderer, who leaves a few pieces of bangles at the crime spot. It was released on 18 October.

== Cast ==
- Ajmal Ameer as Vivek, a cinematographer
- Poonam Kaur as Avanthika
- Archana Kavi as Angel
- Aparna Bajpai as Special Appearance
- Thilakan as Prof. Vincent Chenna Durai
- Thalaivasal Vijay as D.Y.S.P Solomon
- Joy Mathew as priest
