= Mummy & Me =

- Directed by: Jeethu Joseph
- Written by: Jeethu Joseph
- Produced by: Joy Thomas Sakthikulangara
- Starring: Suresh Gopi; Kunchacko Boban; Mukesh; Urvashi; Archana Jose Kavi
- Cinematography: Vipin Mohan
- Edited by: V. Sajan
- Music by: Songs: Sejo John; Score: Gopi Sundar
- Production company: Jithin Arts
- Distributed by: PJ Entertainments Europe
- Release date: 21 May 2010
- Country: India
- Language: Malayalam

Mummy & Me is a 2010 Indian Malayalam-language comedy drama film written and directed by Jeethu Joseph. It stars Kunchacko Boban, Archana Kavi, Mukesh, Urvashi and Suresh Gopi in a cameo appearance. Lalu Alex, Shari, Janardhanan, and Anoop Menon play supporting roles.

== Plot Summary ==
The film centers on a middle-class family consisting of a father, Joseph; his wife, Clara; their teenage daughter, Jewel; and their younger son, Joekuttan. While the family is close-knit, there is significant friction between Jewel and her mother, Clara. Jewel, a college student, desires independence and personal space, while Clara is a traditional parent who constantly monitors her daughter's behavior, fearing that Jewel's desire for freedom will lead her astray.

To improve the situation, Joseph gifts Jewel a computer. Through an online chat room, Jewel begins communicating with an anonymous user named "Amir." The two establish a rule never to disclose their real-life identities to one another. Amir acts as a confidant, offering Jewel advice on how to communicate more effectively with her family. Following his guidance, Jewel's behavior improves, leading to a more harmonious home environment.

Eventually, Jewel develops romantic feelings for Amir. She confesses this to her childhood friend, Rahul, who also has romantic feelings for her. Distressed by the news, Rahul informs both his own parents and Jewel's parents about her online relationship. Jewel's parents attempt to intervene; fearing a confrontation may cause their daughter to act impulsively, they request an in-person meeting with Amir.

On the day of the scheduled meeting, Amir fails to appear. A local priest, Fr. Felix, visits the family and presents a recorded message from Amir. In the recording, Amir reveals that he is bedridden and terminally ill; shortly thereafter, Fr. Felix informs the family that Amir has passed away.

Following a period of mourning, Jewel moves on and marries Rahul. In the final scene, the family visits Fr. Felix's orphanage, where it is revealed that Amir is alive and was watching the family from a distance. He tells Fr. Felix that he believes faking his death was the necessary course of action to ensure Jewel could achieve closure and continue her life.

== Cast ==
- Kunchacko Boban as Rahul
- Mukesh as Joseph
- Urvashi as Clara Joseph
- Archana Jose Kavi as Jewel Joseph
- Lalu Alex as Thomas, Rahul's father
- Shari as Mary, Rahul's mother
- Master Jeevan as Joekuttan Joseph
- Anoop Menon as Dr. Salim P. Ummer
- Janardhanan as Fr. Felix
- Sudheesh as Reji
- Arun as Freddy
- Aravind Akash as Deepan
- Sudhi Koppa as College student
- Bineesh Kodiyeri as GV Peringodan
- Suresh Gopi as Amir (cameo appearance)

== Production ==
Filming took place in Elamgulam, Ponkunnam, and in Kuttikkanam. Scenes were also shot at the Amala Jyothi College of Engineering in Kanjirapally.

== Soundtrack ==
The film's soundtrack contains 6 songs, all composed by Sejo John.

#	Title	Singer(s)
1	"Aarume Kaanaathe"	Kartik
2	"Malaakhapole"	K. S. Chitra
3	"Michael Jackson"	Sayanora Philip, Benny Dayal
4	"Super Mom"	Sayanora Philip
5	"Venmukilin [F]"	K. S. Chitra
6	"Venmukilin [M]"	Rahul Nambiar

== Release ==
The film was released on 21 May 2010.

=== Box office ===
The film was a commercial success.

== Awards ==
- Filmfare Award for Best Supporting Actress - Malayalam - Urvashi
