= Memories (2013 film) =

2013 Indian film by Jeethu Joseph

- Theatrical release poster
- Directed by: Jeethu Joseph
- Written by: Jeethu Joseph
- Produced by: P K Muralidharan; Santha Murali
- Starring: Prithviraj Sukumaran
- Cinematography: Sujith Vaassudev
- Edited by: Johnkutty
- Music by: Songs: Sejo John; Score: Anil Johnson
- Production company: Anantha Visions
- Distributed by: Murali Films & Tricolor Entertainments
- Release date: 9 August 2013
- Running time: 143 minutes
- Country: India
- Language: Malayalam

Memories is a 2013 Indian Malayalam-language slasher film written and directed by Jeethu Joseph. The film stars Prithviraj Sukumaran and S. P. Sreekumar in the lead roles. It revolves around a drunkard police officer, Sam Alex, who is forced into investigating a series of serial murders.

Memories was released on 9 August 2013 to positive reviews from critics and was a commercial success.

It has since gained cult status and is regarded as one of the finest and most entertaining crime thrillers in Malayalam cinema. It was remade in Tamil as Aarathu Sinam.

== Plot ==
Sam Alex is an IPS officer in Kerala Police, who is heavily dependent on alcohol to ease the loss of his family. Sam was a brave, dynamic, efficient and daring officer and a good team commander and a peaceful family guy, leading a good life with his family. His beloved wife, Teena and daughter were murdered by a terrorist right in front of his eyes, as a revenge for killing his brother. He kills the terrorist and as a result, turns into an alcoholic. Sam's superior officer, IG Aravindaksha Menon, requests him to proceed with a parallel investigation in a case involving the disappearance and possible kidnapping of several young married men, since the present police team is not able to make any progress in the case.

Sam refuses to do this. Later, his mother, Marykutty, requests him to take up the investigation. Sam soon gets into the case files and consults the post-mortem documents and the doctors who conducted it. Soon, Sam makes a breakthrough in the case. Another two kidnappings happen, and all this leads to Sam's conclusion of the killer. The killer is an eccentric person, who has a limp and a short right leg and either hates or loves women. The killer leaves certain clues inscribed by a sharp surgical knife on the chest of the victims.

This serves Sam's thinking of what kind of person the killer is and who is his next target. Upon careful examination of the words inscribed in the body of the victims, Sam uncovers that the words are actually Aramaic, the language Jesus used for communication. The words are later found to point to biblical proverbs, thus helping Sam lead to the conclusion that the killer is insane and assumes the victims gave up their lives for the sins committed by their respective wives. He also finds out that these killings have similarities with the crucifixion of Jesus Christ, i.e. a calculation of three days. The victims were taken away on a Friday and their bodies are recovered on the following Sunday. He calls the wives of victims for an inquiry meeting and tells them that they had a link with a guy named Anand, who studied with them a certain years back, but there was no evidence of such a person. Sam concludes that Anand changed his identity and is living under a new name, Peter.

Sam realizes that there is a final target that Anand will not miss and will disappear after that. He eventually finds out that the target is his brother, Sanju, and his wife, Anitha, is the last link in the connection. Sam finds out with the help of his colleague and other evidence that Anand has a property near Kottayam. He goes there to save Sanju. After killing Anand, Sam gives up drinking, and he finally moves on and adopts Anand's sister Parvathi's daughter.

== Cast ==
- Prithviraj Sukumaran as Sam Alex IPS
- S. P. Sreekumar as Anand (Peter)
- Vijayaraghavan as IG Aravindhaksha Menon IPS
- Miya George as Varsha Mathews
- Meghana Raj as Teena Sam, Sam's late wife
- Suresh Krishna as SP Vinod Krishna IPS
- Sreejith Ravi as CI Antony Joseph
- Nedumudi Venu as Father John
- Vanitha Krishnachandran as Marykutty Alex, Sam's mother
- Rahul Madhav as Sanju Alex, Sam's brother
- Irshad as Isaac
- Praveena as Parvathi Isaac
- Baiju V. K. as SI K.C. Suresh
- Balaji Sarma as Constable Somasekharan
- Jijoy Rajagopal as Dr. Shameer
- Madhupal as Dr. Sukumaran Nair
- Kozhikode Narayanan Nair as Krishna Pillai
- Seema G. Nair as Valsamma
- Mahalakshmi Sarveshwaran as Vimala Menon
- Aneesh G. Menon as Vijay
- Neeraj Madhav as Mechanic
- Koottickal Jayachandran as Shop owner
- Vineeth Mohan as Ramesh
- Disney James as Terrorist

== Reception ==
Sify.com rated the film as "Good", stating that "Memories is an engaging film that has been well made." Gayathry of Oneindia.in says that "Memories is undoubtedly an entertaining investigation movie." Aswin of The Times of India says that "Memories is an engaging watch, courtesy a good plot and a cast that does justice to the plot." Indiaglitz.com says that "Memories is a thriller which may find space among the list of well crafted suspense thrillers in Mollywood. Nowrunning.com rated the film as "Above Average", stating that "Memories is a decent entertainer and stunning thriller in which plot twists abound, and the ambiance is laced with intrigue."

== Music ==
The music for the film was composed by Sejo John with the background score composed by Anil Johnson.

Memories

Soundtrack album by Sejo John
- Released: 2013
- Genre: Film soundtrack
- Language: Malayalam
- Label: Sony Music India

Sejo John chronology
Housefull (2013)	Memories (2013)	6B Paradise (2013)

No.	Title	Lyrics	Artist(s)	Length
1.	"Thirayum Theeravum"	Sejo John	Vijay Yesudas
2.	"Memories"	Shelton Pinheiro	Shelton Pinheiro

== Accolades ==
- Kerala State Film Award for Best Cinematography (Sujith Vaassudev)
- Asianet Film Award for Most Popular Actor (Prithviraj)
