= Vishwa Thulasi =

- Directed by: Sumathy Ram
- Written by: Sumathy Ram
- Produced by: Ramki
- Starring: Mammootty; Nandita Das
- Cinematography: B. Kannan
- Edited by: Suresh Urs
- Music by: Score: Ilaiyaraaja; Songs: M. S. Viswanathan; Ilaiyaraaja (1 song)
- Production company: Sindhujaa Films
- Distributed by: Sushmithaa Cine Enterprises
- Release date: 22 October 2004
- Running time: 120 minutes
- Country: India
- Language: Tamil

Vishwa Thulasi is a 2004 Indian Tamil-language drama film directed by Sumathy Ram, starring Mammooty and Nandita Das. This film's score and soundtrack were composed by M. S. Viswanathan and Ilayaraaja . The film was notable for having a female director.

== Plot ==
The film, set in the 1940s and moving to the 1960s, revolves around the emotional story of Thulasi returning to her village to become a dance teacher. She cannot bring herself to forget Vishwa, a man she has been in love with for two decades. Memories of Vishwa haunt her constantly, and upon a chance meeting with him, she discovers he too is struggling with his love for her. Both are haunted by the memory of Thulasi's cousin, a figure who is unable to control his obsession for his cousin and hide his resentment at Thulasi's feelings for Vishwa.

Thulasi comes to Sundarapuri after her guardians — her grandma and uncle — pass away, to work as teacher in a dance school. It is in Sundarapuri that Vishwa, the Zamindar whom she had met 20 years ago, lives. They meet again and the feelings that had blossomed in their hearts as teenagers, are revived. Vishwa is unmarried and Thulasi has gone through an unceremonious ritual in the name of matrimony, but fear of societal stigma and innate inhibition keep them asunder.

Sensing their intense love for each other, Pattabhi, the manager at Vishwa's house, helps them overcome their fears. It is then that fate enters in the form of Shiva.

== Cast ==
- Mammootty as Vishwa
- Nandita Das as Thulasi
- Manoj K. Jayan as Shiva
- Delhi Ganesh as Pattabhi
- Sukumari as Vishwa's mother
- Mohit
- Anirudh
- Ambili Devi as Young Thulasi
- Rajhesh Vaidhya
- Kamala Kamesh
- Nithya Ravindar (uncredited)

== Production ==
The film's first schedule started at Pollachi then held at Tharangampadi and Cuddalore. Some scenes were shot at 200 year old house at Ottapalam, Kerala. The filming took 67 days to be completed.

== Soundtrack ==
Songs of the film were composed and orchestrated by M. S. Viswanathan. Background score and the song "Engu Piranthathu" were composed by Ilaiyaraaja.

Song	Singers	Lyrics	Composer
"Aaya Kalaikalin"	Srinivas, Aparna	Sumathy Ram	M. S. Viswanathan
"Engu Piranthathu"	Tippu, Chinmayi	Ilaiyaraaja	Ilaiyaraaja
"Kanavilavathu"	Gopika Poornima, Karthik	Ilaiyaraaja	M. S. Viswanthan
"En Maname"	Tippu, Gopika Poornima	Ilaiyaraaja	M. S. Viswanthan
"Kannamma Kanavillaiya	S. P. Balasubrahmanyam	Sumathy Ram	M. S. Viswanthan
"Mayakkama"	Srinivas, Sujatha	Sumathy Ram	M. S. Viswanthan
"Nizhalin Kathai Ithu"	S. P. Balasubrahmanyam	Sumathy Ram	M. S. Viswanthan
"Vishwa Thulasi"	Bhavatharini	Ilaiyaraaja	M. S. Viswanthan
"Ilavarasi Ilaithu Ponale	Sujatha, Srinivas	Sumathy Ram	M. S. Viswanthan

== Reception ==
Malini Mannath of Chennai Online wrote that "Though one can appreciate the debutant director's sincerity to give a clean, aesthetic, lyrical film, quite different from the dance-fight-romance routine, one feels 'Vishwa Thulasi' would have made a pleasant video-album. Stretching it to two hours, is stretching it a bit too much!" Malathi Rangarajan of The Hindu wrote that "In a film scenario where sexy gyrations and obscene overtones are a norm, Sumathy, who is new to cinema, shows real guts in coming out with a clean film that moves quite slowly, of course, with veterans who deliver the goods with ease." Sify wrote "Viswa Thulasi is an amateurish attempt at film making. Every film has- or should have- a logic, this one defies all logic".

== Awards ==
The film has won the following awards since its release:

2005 WorldFest Houston (United States)

- Won - Gold Remi Award - Music Score - Ilaiyaraaja, M. S. Viswanathan
- Won - Gold Special Jury Award - First Feature - Vishwa Thulasi - Sumathy Ram

Tamil Nadu State Film Awards

- Won - Tamil Nadu State Film Award for Second Best Film - Second Prize, 2004
- Won - Tamil Nadu State Film Award for best Choreography - 2004
