= Jilebi (2015 film) =

- Promotional poster
- Directed by: Arun Shekar
- Written by: Arun Shekar
- Screenplay by: Arun Shekar
- Produced by: East Coast Vijayan
- Starring: Jayasurya; Ramya Nambeesan; Vijayaraghavan; Shari; K. P. A. C. Lalitha; Leema Babu
- Cinematography: Alby Antony
- Edited by: Sooraj E. S.
- Music by: Bijibal
- Production company: East Coast
- Distributed by: East Coast Reel; Real Entertainment
- Release date: 31 July 2015
- Running time: 134 minutes
- Country: India
- Language: Malayalam

Jilebi is a 2015 Indian Malayalam-language children's film directed by Arun Shekar (in his directorial debut) and produced by East Coast Vijayan, starring Jayasurya, Ramya Nambeesan and Vijayaraghavan. The film released on 31 July 2015 to generally positive reviews.

== Plot ==
Jilebi is a story about confrontation between the middle aged Sreekuttan and his city-bred nephew and niece. Sreekuttan is a villager whose life is confined to his farm and crops. Far away in Dubai, trouble brews for him in the form of his nephew and niece. From their first meeting, it becomes evident that both Sreekuttan and the children are uncomfortable with the rustic setting. The only thing holding them down are their roots to the place. The tech-savvy kids are determined to make everyone around them miserable. Soon enough their vacation comes to a close and they leave their family home with Sreekuttan in charge to start school in Kodaikanal. The road trip to their new school leads to surprises - some sour, some sweet for both alike. A bond develops between Sreekuttan and the children. At school they meet Shilpa - the children's mother. She angrily lambasts Sreekuttan and blames his village farming attitude and lack of responsibility for being late for admissions. Sreekuttan puts Shilpa in her place for her snobbish attitude and reminds her money does not make relationships change their inherent values. Later, understanding her mistake Shilpa lets her children attend school near the family house and flies back from Dubai to Thrissur.

== Cast ==
- Jayasurya as Sreekuttan
- Ramya Nambeesan as Shilpa
- Gourav Menon as Pachu, Shilpa's son
- Baby Sayuri as Ammu, Shilpa's daughter
- Vijayaraghavan as Chandradas, Shilpa's father
- Shari as Shilpa's mother
- K. P. A. C. Lalitha as Sreekuttan's mother
- Dharmajan Bolgatty as Tony
- Sasi Kalinga as Kumaran
- Leema Babu as Reji, Shilpa's colleague
- Minon John
- Harisree Martin
- Disney James as Vijay, Shilpa's colleague
- Tony Alex Valluvassery as Jithendran
- Manju Sunichen as Servant at Sreekuttans house

== Soundtrack ==
Music by Bijibal, Lyrics by East Coast Vijayan, Santhosh Varma

- "Njaanoru Malayalee" - P. Jayachandran
- "Varika Omale" - Gayathri Ashokan, Najim Arshad
- "Cycle Vannu" - chorus
