= My Boss =

2012 film by Jeethu Joseph

- Theatrical release poster
- Directed by: Jeethu Joseph
- Written by: Jeethu Joseph
- Produced by: East Coast Vijayan
- Starring: Dileep; Mamta Mohandas
- Cinematography: Anil Nair
- Edited by: V. Sajan
- Music by: Songs: M. Jayachandran; Sejo John; Score: Gopi Sundar
- Production company: East Coast Audio & Visual Entertainments
- Distributed by: Manjunatha & Kas
- Release date: 13 November 2012
- Running time: 158 minutes
- Country: India
- Language: Malayalam

My Boss is a 2012 Indian Malayalam-language romantic comedy film written and directed by Jeethu Joseph. The film stars Dileep and Mamta Mohandas in the lead roles. The film is produced by East Coast Vijayan under the banner of East Coast Communications. It was filmed in Mumbai and various locations in Kerala.

The film is an adaptation of the 2009 American film The Proposal starring Ryan Reynolds and Sandra Bullock. The American film included various dialogues and plot twists which were adapted into My Boss.

The film is set in the backdrop of the IT industry. The film follows Manu Varma (Dileep) who's hired as the executive assistant in a leading firm in Mumbai who aspires to migrate to a foreign country while Priya Nair (Mamtha Mohandas), his boss, an Indian-born Australian citizen has visa problems at a time when she has the opportunity to get a promotion. This leads Priya to get into a fake marriage with Manu to stay in India. My Boss was released on 13 November 2012 coinciding with Diwali to positive reviews from critics and was declared a commercial hit. The film was remade in Kannada in 2014 as Software Ganda starring Jaggesh and Nikita Thukral. It is also remade in Tamil as Sandakkari in 2026 starring Vimal and Shriya Saran.

== Plot ==
Manu Varma lands in Mumbai to join an IT firm, Quadra Infotech, as executive assistant to C.M.O Priya S. Nair. He has a BTech degree and passed with distinction in 2004 but has no work experience until 2012. Priya is shocked seeing his reports and his distinction and asks why chose this job; he says it's because of family problems. Priya is an Australian citizen, is a witch of a woman who verbally abuses her subordinates and criticizes them for the slightest mistakes. Manu works his heart out for three months under his cruel boss. He is ably supported by an 'all in one' errand boy, Ali. Manu gets his chance to hit back at his boss when she has visa issues and is expecting a promotion to company head.

Priya cooks up a story that she is in a relationship with Manu and they will soon get married. They act as lovers which leads to several comic scenes. Manu then gets approached by Priya's rival, Mathew Abraham, who is fighting for the same promotion. Matthew offers to help Manu as long as he keeps Priya away from the office for 30 days. Mathew also informs the immigration of Priya's fraud. The immigration officer warns Priya and Manu of the consequences of fraud marriages and they will investigate this matter thoroughly. Manu convinces Priya that she has to come to Kerala to meet his family so that the investigators will be convinced by Manu's family's statement. Manu takes his "bride" (to be) to his home in Kerala. Priya discovers that Manu's family is very rich with a palatial home and acres of farmland and that he has a loving mother Lakshmi and doting grandmother. He had left home because he had frequent fights with his father Thekkeparakkal Prabhkara Varma, who was against Manu seeking a job and wanting to migrate to a western country. Gradually, Manu tries to convince his family that Priya is wife material by making her do traditional chores, thus taking his revenge on Priya as well. Manu's family asks him to stop the drama and accepts Priya into the family. However, Priya softens and starts loving with his family. Manu realizes that deep down Priya is soft-hearted and stops his revenge, much to the disappointment of Mathew. Things get out of hand when Manu's parents start planning a repeat wedding ceremony. Priya reveals that she is Manu's boss and the reason why they put up the act. This shocks Manu's parents.

Manu gets into a hand combat with Mathew Abraham, who had come to Manu's homeland under the frustration that Manu cheated on him for Priya. Later, Priya meets her egoistic and boasted mother and leaves after a revealing that she could not accept her as her mother but she had seen a motherly love in Manu's mother. Prabhakara Varma, who blames Manu for his feud between Mathew Abraham and knowing (mistakenly) about the intention of cheating Priya, is confronted by Manu for his past actions and reveals his hatred towards him, shocking Prabhakar. Manu realises his father's love for him. Priya apologies to Manu's parents and leaves for Mumbai without telling Manu.

Manu follows her to Mumbai and learns that she has resigned. Manu proposes to Priya which leaves her stunned. Manu apologizes and is about to leave when Priya pulls him back suddenly and kisses him. They both leave for Kuttanad.

== Cast ==
- Dileep as Manu Varma
- Mamta Mohandas as Priya S. Nair
- Kalabhavan Shajon as Ali
- Saikumar as Thekkepurakkal Prabhakaran Varma, Manu's father
- Seetha as Lakshmi, Manu's mother
- Valsala Menon as Manu's grandmother
- Jeevan Gopal as Rahul, Manu's nephew
- Mukesh as the Head of the IT Firm
- Anand as Mathew Abraham
- K. B. Ganesh Kumar as Tom George, FRRO Officer
- Nisha Sarang as Sneha, Manu's colleague
- Soniya Rasheed as Jyothi, Priya's friend
- Rekha as Priya's mother (cameo appearance)
- Dharmajan Bolgatty as Hotel supplier (cameo appearance)
- Abu Salim as Rowdy Vaasu (cameo appearance)
- Sheela Sree as Vasu's wife (cameo appearance)
- Dinesh Prabhakar as auto-driver (cameo appearance)
- Cherthala Lalitha as Mary (cameo appearance)

== Production ==
The film was launched on 23 April 2012, with a pooja ceremony organised at Sarovaram in Kochi. The film went into production in May 2012, where it was filmed in Mumbai and various locations in Kerala.

== Music ==
The soundtrack consists of 9 songs composed by Sejo John and M. Jayachandran.

Song	Length	Singer(s)	Composer
"Enthinennariyilla" (Duet)	4:32	P. Jayachandran, Manjari	M. Jayachandran
"Kuttanadan Punchaneele"	4:00	Rahul Nambiar & Rimi Tomy	Sejo John
"Vilakkukal Theliyunnu"	4:50	Madhu Balakrishnan & Chitra Arun	
"Unaradi Nee"	2:58	Sejo John	Sejo John
"Sooryane Kaithodan"	4:51	Karthik	Sejo John
"Enthinennariyilla" (Male)	4:32	P. Jayachandran	M. Jayachandran
"Freedom Ka Soniya"	4:15	Navraj Hans, Neha Venugopal	Sejo John
"Enthinennariyilla" (Female)	4:32	Manjari	M. Jayachandran
"Freedom Ka Soniya" (Remix)	3:37	Neha Venugopal	Sejo John

== Reception ==
=== Critical response ===
My Boss received mostly positive reviews from critics. On the review aggregator website Rotten Tomatoes, 38% of 2 critics' reviews are positive, with an average rating of 6.8/10.

Sify.com gave the verdict "Masala Entertainer" and said, "With a brisk pace that barely gives much time to think, My Boss could be an entertaining affair, especially if you are not too bothered about the film's inspirations and other nuances. This one is perhaps not meant to be taken too seriously and better enjoy this with a pack of popcorn!" The film is a copy of the Hollywood film The Proposal (2009) that had Sandra Bullock and Ryan Reynolds in the lead.

=== Box office ===
The film was one of the highest-grossing Malayalam films of the year, and became a commercial success. The film ran over 100 days in theatres.
