= Best of Luck (2010 film) =

- Directed by: M. A. Nishad
- Written by: M.A. Nishad; Vinu Kiriath
- Produced by: A & M Entertainment Company
- Starring: Kailash; Asif Ali; Prabhu; Urvashi; Archana Kavi; Rima Kallingal
- Cinematography: Sanjeev Shankar
- Music by: Euphoria
- Distributed by: A & M Entertainment Company
- Release date: 17 November 2010
- Country: India
- Language: Malayalam

Best of Luck is a 2010 Indian Malayalam-language black comedy film written and directed by M.A. Nishad. It stars Kailash, Asif Ali, Prabhu, Urvashi, Archana Kavi and Rima Kallingal.

The soundtrack was composed by the Indian rock band Euphoria. The song "NaNa", which was used in the trailers, was composed by A. R. Rahman for an American film, Couples Retreat. The film was a remake of the Bollywood comedy film All the Best: Fun Begins. Unlike the original, the film was extremely negatively received and was a commercial failure. The movie was remade in Kannada in 2015 as Ond Chance Kodi.

This film was a box-office bomb.

== Plot ==
Surya is Vinayaka Naickar's stepbrother. Vinayakan is very rich; Surya is struggling to make a living. Vinayakan sends some amount every month to Surya and that is how he survives. Manu is Surya's friend who dreams about becoming a filmmaker.

One day Manu meets the star Mammootty on the set of a movie shooting and tells him that he has a story which he plans to make as a movie. Mammootty listens to the synopsis and tells Manu to call him once the script is ready. Since Manu got the dates from a super star like Mammootty, he plans to make the movie soon and looks for finance. Manu introduces Surya as the producer and borrows money from a lender called Bhasi at a very high rate of interest. The production assistant runs away with that money.

Surya has to repay that money and he has nothing with him. So he lies to Vinayaka that he got married and he needs cash. Vinayaka says that he is too busy to come but will send the money. Surya even introduces his girlfriend Neethu as his wife to Vinayaka's advocate Uthaman. Later, when Neethu is in Bangkok with her father, Vinayakan comes to meet the couple. Surya, out of desperation, asks Manu's girlfriend Diya to act as Neethu. While things were going smoothly, Neethu comes back from vacation and further confusions arise. Now Neethu has to act as Manu's girlfriend. They appoint a servant called Thamara at their house but Surya has to introduce her as the sister of Neethu to Vinayakan. She creates all sort of problems for Surya and Manu.

Surya and Manu have to tell all sorts of lies to hide the truth but the truth finally surfaces and it turns out that Vinayakan was aware of what was happening and Thamara was his wife who he sent to their home in advance to get the facts. Finally, Manu takes Surya's story as his script and makes a movie in which Mammootty plays the real-life character of Vinayakan. The movie ends when Vinayakan congratulates Mammootty for his acting skills after the final scene in the movie.

== Cast ==
- Kailash as Surya
- Asif Ali as Manu
- Prabhu as Vinayaka Naickar
- Urvashi as Thamara
- Archana Kavi as Neethu
- Rima Kallingal as Diya
- Jagathy Sreekumar as Advocate Uthaman
- Suraj Venjaramood as Shanghai Pushpan
- Baiju
- Bheeman Raghu as Bhasi
- Machan Varghese as Amminikuttan
- Janardhanan as Kuzhithura Ponnappan
- Jaffar Idukki
- Mammootty as himself (special appearance)
- Mukesh as himself (special appearance)
- Johny Antony as himself (special appearance)
- Fahadh Faasil as himself (special appearance)
- Kollam Ajith as himself (special appearance)
- Nalini

== Critical reception ==
Best of Luck received unanimously negative reviews. Paresh C Palicha of Rediff gave the movie 2/5 stars, stating that "Nishad, who has given us interesting films like Pakal and Vairam, tries his hand at comedy and makes a film that looks like a Priyadharshan film of the past. There is confusion galore with mistaken or changed identities, foolish impersonations and slapstick comedy. He even tries to spoof the new Malayalam film fetish for a Tamil background in all the films. Nishad's bravado to try comedy with Best of Luck must be commented but he fails to deliver an engaging comedy." Moviebuzz of Sify gave the movie a verdict of "Below Average", opining that "Best of Luck has a funny premise for sure but the problem is that it hasn't been narrated in an attractive manner. Nishad had shown promise with his earlier movie, Vairam, but he loses his ground this time around. 'Best of Luck', next time." IndiaGlitz gave the movie a verdict of "Needs some more luck", concluding that "All in all, Best of Luck is a movie that is a poor show all the way. It do[es]n't have [many] chances to turn lucky at the box office." Veeyen of Now Running gave the movie 2/5 stars, saying that "The title of M A Nishad's latest film, Best of Luck, seems more like a greet thrown straight at its viewers. You do need some extra bit of luck to actually decipher what's happening in it. Walk into the cinema halls with some extra bit of courage and resolve to sit through the film. Best of Luck!"
