= St Mary'sile Kolapathakam =

- Directed by: H.N. Shijoy
- Written by: H.N. Shijoy
- Produced by: K.P. Rajendran
- Cinematography: Anil Narayanan
- Edited by: Viji Abraham
- Production company: Krishnanjali Films
- Distributed by: Mahadeva Films
- Release date: 2015
- Running time: Malayalam
- Country: India

St Marysile Kolapathakam (transl. Murder in Saint Mary's) is a 2015 Indian Malayalam language crime thriller film produced by K.P. Rajendran under the banner of Krishnajali Movie Productions. The film is written and directed by H. N Shijoy with Sudheer Karamana in the lead role along with Aparna Nair, Sreejith Vijay, Indrans and Poojitha Menon. The Music is composed by Viswajith.

== Plot ==
The whole story revolves around a murder that takes place in St Mary's Hostel in Trivantrum. Pooja is a sales girl in one of the famous textiles in Trivantrum. Her best friend is Meera. Both of them stay at St Mary's hostel. One day they come to know that one of the inhabitants of the hostel is missing and later found murdered in the hostel. Later police officer Solomon arrives to investigate the murder. The investigation leads to many twists and turns. The film also shows how a police investigation affects the lives of people who are related to the victim.

== Cast ==
- Sudheer Karamana as CI Solomon Peter
- Aparna Nair as Pooja
- Sreejith Vijay as Sanjay
- Rohith Menon as Emerson Clement
- Usuf Ali as CI Roshan Jose
- Indrans as Security Rasheed
- Satheesh Vettikkavala as Autodriver Sathyan
- Poojitha Menon as Veena Susan
- Anju Raj as Meera Sanjay
- Leena Nair as Merin
- Aparna P Nair as Rakhy
- Veena Shivaprasad as Jyothsna

== See also ==
- Cocktail
- Madhura Naranga
