= Ormakalil =

2022 film directed by M. Vishwa Pratap

- Movie poster
- Directed by: M. Vishwa Pratap
- Written by: M. Vishwa Pratap
- Produced by: M. Vishwa Pratap
- Starring: Shankar; Deepa Kartha; Shaju Sreedhar; Poojitha Menon; Nasser Latif; Vijayakumari
- Cinematography: Nithin K Raj
- Edited by: Vipin Mannur
- Music by: Joy Maxwell
- Production company: Premier Cinemas
- Distributed by: ZAGA International
- Release date: 23 September 2022
- Running time: 98 minutes
- Country: India
- Language: Malayalam

Ormakalil is a 2022 Indian Malayalam-language family thriller film written, produced and directed by M. Vishwa Pratap. It stars Shankar as DIG and Deepa Kartha in the main roles supported by Shaju Sreedhar, Poojitha Menon, Nasser Latif and Vijayakumari. Joy Maxwell composed Music and cinematography by Nithin K Raj.

== Plot ==
Whoever we are, whatever we are, life has its own journey. We all have to travel along with that. That is the journey of life. A mother's love and affection for her children are endless and it cannot be measured. It is an endless regard. A mother has more affection than anybody else for her children. It's all about a mother's passion.

The story travels parallelly on both tracks (i.e.) the journey of life and a mother's passion. A complete family story, scene by scene - suspense, sentiments and philosophies - highly built up.

The plot of the movie 'Ormakalil' - a mother's passion revolves around surviving life situations. The shooting took place in the scenic locations of Kanyakumari district.

== Cast ==
- Shankar as DIG Raj Mohan
- Shaju Sreedhar as Devan
- Deepa Kartha as Veena Balachandran
- Nasser Latif as Pratap Chandran
- Poojitha Menon as Reshmi
- Vijayakumari as Lakshmi Amma

== Music ==
The music of the movie is by Joy Maxwell with lyrics written by M. Vishwa Pratap .

Song title	Singer(s)
"In This Wonderful"	Jassie Gift
"En Sneha Ponmukile"	Sujatha Mohan
