= Meerayude Dukhavum Muthuvinte Swapnavum =

- Directed by: Vinayan
- Written by: Vinayan
- Produced by: Tom George Kolath; Stephen K. Sam
- Starring: Prithviraj Sukumaran; Ambili Devi; Renuka Menon; Jagathy Sreekumar; Sreedevi Paniker
- Cinematography: Alagappan N Jithu Palghat
- Edited by: G. Murali
- Music by: Mohan Sitara
- Release date: 25 July 2003
- Country: India
- Language: Malayalam

Meerayude Dukhavum Muthuvinte Swapnavum (transl. Meera's sorrow and Muthu's dream) is a 2003 Indian Malayalam-language drama film written and directed by Vinayan and produced by Tom George Kolath. The film stars Prithviraj Sukumaran and Ambili Devi. This movie is about a brother protecting his disabled sister. The film is based on Porkkaalam (1997).

== Plot ==
The opening scene of the movie itself establishes the movie's overarching theme of the deep brother-sister bond shared by Muthu and Meera. Meera, is portrayed as sitting on a wooden pushcart in the middle of a busy market square musically calling out to her prospective buyers with an orange in hand. A band of delinquent men in the vicinity decides to make the attractive girl a target of their arrogant and entitled misdemeanour. However their attempts immediately go awry as an unfazed Meera lets out a whistle that seems to summon her brother onto the scene - the character of Muthu,, thus making his gallant entry beating off the hooligans and protecting his sister's honor. When Muthu is about to beat a hooligan senseless, Meera trails her way over ground towards Muthu, entreating him to show the man mercy and let him go. This is also when the audience is given to understand that Meera's two limbs are paralyzed and she is unable to "walk". Her disability and the trials and tribulations this puts her through is central to the development of the story. The undying devotion and helping hands of her brother and her own ability to sing beautifully are the only redeeming forces that seem to soften Meera's misery.

Meera and Muthu live in a small mud house along with their grandmother, as a whiny old woman wallowing in self pity and casting hurtful insults at Meera's disability, when she is not smoking herself senseless on cannabis. Meera takes care of the household while Muthu works in a brick kiln with Chandran, a friend and well-wisher.

In a private and slightly risqué encounter inside the brick kiln that Aswathy exacts from Muthu, the parallel arc of their romantic pursuit is introduced. The potential realization of their romance though is suspect since Aswathy, belongs to a well placed family while Muthu is working several working class jobs at once to make his ends meet and save up money for the marriage that he dreams his sister will one day be able to have.

Muthu is filled with hope as a prospective alliance comes to visit. However things will not follow through because the groom's father insists on being paid an unachievable hundred thousand rupees in dowry. Muthu is enraged at their avarice and berates the matchmaker never to conduct such people to his home again.

A notable and recurring character in the narrative is the masterfully dislikeable Suseelan. He is Muthu's paternal uncle and lives on the same premises as Muthu along with his family, the responsibilities of which he routinely abdicates owing to his gambling problem. At various instances in the story he is seen trying to nick metal utensils and even the goats to sell them off in order to get enough money for another game of poker. In an act of selfish and unfeeling cruelty, he deceives Muthu into believing that his son has graciously offered to accept Meera as his bride by reading from a forged letter and under this pretext extorts from Muthu all the money he had saved up for his sister. When the son returns home, and is greeted by everyone with adulation for his magnanimity, he is only shocked to learn about a non-existent letter and rather crudely admits that he could never picture someone with a disability as his bride. Muthu is devastated by this horseplay of betrayal and reacts in another moment of enraged battery.

In an aggravating subplot, a medicine man makes an appearance in the village temple, ostensibly with divine powers of healing disease and infirmity. At the encouragement of Divakaran, the father of Muthu's object of affection Aswathy, he recruits the intervention of the medicine man with the hopes that his sister might finally be able to walk again. Once again, he unhands his hard-earned money for the sole purpose of alleviating his sister's suffering. There is an air of optimism in the minds of both Meera and Muthu as the medicine man begins his healing rituals by meeting Meera in their house and applying his prayers and healing oils on Meera's torpid legs. However this is only short-lived. In an unsuspecting hour of healing, the medicine man tries to molest Meera, overpowering her attempts to free herself from his lecherous grasp. The grandmother is lying on her bed in a state of inebriated unconsciousness when this happens. However, Muthu hears the commotion and his sister's cry for help and rushes into the house. He is inflamed at the sight of the trespass and shows no mercy in the violent altercation that follows and severs both the arms of the unrelenting and unremorseful medicine man. Consequently, he is tried in a court of law and is sentenced to imprisonment for a period of six months. In a poignant scene where Muthu is about to be transported into his prison sentence on a police vehicle, he consoles a sobbing Meera by reassuring her of his return saying that six months will be over in the blink of an eye.

However, during this time Suseelan is once again animated by his manic tendencies and convinces Meera that if a certain amount of money is not being paid to the prison police regularly Muthu will be beaten to a pulp. This results in Meera singing on the streets in order to solicit charity from the public. Muthu by this time has been released from his jail cell only to return to the village to see the sight of his sister begging for money. In a fit of rage he beats up Suseelan and his sidekick for putting her through this ordeal and walks back home carrying his sister in his arms. Muthu is humiliated and grief-stricken to the point of tearfully rejecting the feigned affection of everyone around him and his sister.

Resolved to see the hand of his sister given away in marriage, he consults the matchmaker and expresses his determination to find a suitable match for Meera. Meanwhile he meets up with Aswathy and painfully urges her to forget him since a life with him is not possible because of the impossible-to-bridge divide in their social standings and his loyalty to her father. Besides, he vows to not get married unless his sister gets wedded first. Aswathy is heartbroken to hear Muthu suggest that they simply forget the love they had for each other and acquiesce to her family's progressing plans for her marriage. In spite of all this, a weeping Aswathy insists that Muthu is the only one she shall ever marry.

Aswathy confesses her romantic liaison with Muthu to her family and is met with violent disapproval and chastisement from her father, Divakaran. However seeing as how he would eventually lose his daughter's very life if he were to force her out of being in love with Muthu, Divakaran proposes to Muthu that he marry Aswathy with no further ado. However notwithstanding the consent from Aswathy's family Muthu reaffirms his decision to not get married until Meera finds a match. Divakaran finds this to be an improbable notion and recommends rather unceremoniously that they enter Meera into an institution for the disabled so that he can stop worrying himself sick about his sister and start a life of happiness with Aswathy. Muthu's devotion to his sister does not allow him to let the conversation continue.

Meera who was within earshot of this conversation is deeply hurt by the words she hears. When Meera proceeds to meet Aswathy in her home intending to console and reassure her, she is met with derision and blame from Aswathy's mother for "not knowing her place as an invalid" and still desiring to get married.

On her way back home after counselling Aswathy to not rush to rash decisions and promising her to persuade Muthu to comply with the marriage plans, Meera is accosted by her well-meaning aunt who gently enjoins her to agree to moving to an institution, in order to make sure that this rare and unlikely alliance between a well-placed girl and a working class boy would not be thwarted on account of a sibling who needs undivided attention and support. This encounter confirms Meera's growing sense that she is a burden that stands in the way of everyone's happiness. Through tear-soaked eyes and a forced smile she shakes her head in eager agreement and continues to make her way to the house. Her agony is deepened as she reaches the front door and overhears Muthu in tears recounting his woes like a prayer in front of a photograph of their dead parents.

Meera leaves a parting note and shuffles her way to the brick kiln and hides herself deep inside the tall columns of bricks, prepared to end her life in the deadly, imminent heat of the kiln. Having no knowledge of Meera having entered the belly of the kiln, Muthu sets the kiln ablaze. As the kiln begins to burn, the matchmaker, in a weird twist a fate, enters the scene with the bonne nouvelle of finally ascertaining an earlier suitor's willingness to marry Meera, the dowry no longer presenting as an obstacle since the father of the suitor, the only person who had demanded it has passed away six months ago. Muthu is beside himself with happiness and runs into the house to share his joy with Meera, only to see the suicide note she has left. He realizes in horror that his baby sister is inside the kiln he had just set ablaze and races to rescue her. Amid a storm that appears symbolic of his own inner weather of grief and rage, Muthu and the villagers start to tear down the kiln by pulling apart the firewood and the bricks. He finally manages to get inside and sees Meera leaning motionless against a wall of bricks in a muddy puddle of rain water. Muthu's soul is crushed by the loss of his baby sister and emerges out of the kiln cradling her lifeless body in his arms, screaming the questioning words of his seething anger and pain into the ears of the storm that is still raging on.

== Cast ==
- Prithviraj Sukumaran as Muthu, brother of Meera
- Ambili Devi as Meera, sister of Muthu
- Renuka Menon as Aswathy, Muthu's Love interest
- Jagathy Sreekumar as Suseelan
- Cochin Haneefa as Divakaran
- Philomina as Meera and Muthu's grandmother
- Sudheesh as Rajendran
- Indrans as Chandran
- Sivaji as Muthalali
- Machan Varghese as Kanaran
- Rizabawa as Advocate
- Manka Mahesh as Ammini
- Remya Nambeesan as Aswathy's sister
- Krishna Prasad
- Yamuna as Rajendran's mother
- Sridevika as Rajendran's sister
- Joemon Joshy as Vimal Kumar
- Geetha Salam
- Sajeev Kumar
