= Rani Raja =

Indian Malayalam television soap opera

- Also known as: റാണി രാജാ
- Genre: Soap opera
- Written by: Girish Gramika
- Directed by: kichu sudharsana
- Starring: Archana Kavi
- Country of origin: India
- Original language: Malayalam
- No. of seasons: 1
- No. of episodes: 210

Production
- Producer: Anto Thevalakkadu
- Cinematography: pradeesh nenmara
- Camera setup: Multi-camera
- Running time: 20–25 minutes
- Production company: anona creations

Original release
- Network: Mazhavil Manorama
- Release: 10 October 2022 – 18 June 2023

Rani Raja (transl. Queen, King) is an Indian Malayalam-language soap opera directed by director Dileep Tavanur. The show premiered on 10 October 2022 on Mazhavil Manorama and aires on-demand through ManoramaMAX. It stars Archana Kavi (later replaced by Mridula Vijay) in the lead role along with Darish Jayaseelan and Poojitha Menon.

== Cast ==
- Archana Kavi / Mridula Vijay as Anamika Haridasan (Aami), eldest daughter of Haridasan and Sudhamani.
- Darish Jayaseelan as Rishi, son of Mahadevan Thampi and Vinodini.
- Poojitha Menon as Priyamvatha, former girl friend of Rishi.
- Manju Satheesh as Sudhamani
- Om Sha as Haridasan
- Raji Menon / Devi Chandana as Vinodhini
- Shivadas Menon as Mahadevan Thampi
- Jiffin George as Gaadha who is a staff member of T mills and has a crush on Rishi. But he takes advantage on her feelings for his own benefits.
- Manve Surendran as Keerthi, eldest daughter of Mahadevan Thampi and Vinodini.
- Disney James as Gopan, husband of Keerthi.
- Bindu Ramakrishnan as Koushalya, mother of Mahadevan Thampi
- Soniya Baiju Kottarakkara
- Archana Thampi as Nikita, youngest daughter of Mahadevan Thampi and Vinodini.
- Aleena Sajan as Kalyani Das
- Shilpa as Saniya
- Thushara Nambiar as Karishma
- Teena Linson as Thara
- Nitika as Anitha
- Sumesh as Manjunath
- Lal Mutta Thara as Ratheendran
- Prashant Kanjiramattom as Johnappan
- Kootikal jayachandran as Jayachandran
- Shemi Martin as Nandhini
- Lakshmi Keerthana as Ponthamara (Ponnu)
