= Maramkothi =

- Film poster
- Directed by: Baby Thomas
- Written by: Baby Thomas
- Screenplay by: Baby Thomas
- Produced by: Francis Christyboy
- Starring: Sreejith Ravi; Indrans; Tini Tom; Mamukkoya; Kochu Preman; Poojitha Menon; Kulappulli Leela; Chali Pala; Santhakumari; Soniya Malhaar
- Cinematography: Sinu Sidharth
- Edited by: Kapil Gopalakrishnan
- Music by: Mathew T Itty
- Production company: Woodpecker Productions
- Release date: 10 October 2014
- Running time: 151 minutes
- Country: India
- Language: Malayalam

Maramkothi (Woodpecker) is a 2014 Indian Malayalam-language drama romance film written and directed by debutant Baby Thomas and produced by Francis Christyboy under the banner of Woodpecker Productions. The film features Sreejith Ravi, Tini Tom and Poojitha Menon in the lead roles. Kochupreman, Indrans, Mamukkoya, Kulappulli Leela and Chali Pala are in the supporting roles.

== Plot ==
The film is centered around a group of common people who fight hard for land and nature. After the withdrawal of British powers from India, a sizeable portion of land came under the possession of landlords which made the conditions of local folks pity. When the cruelty of landlords increased, many tenants were forced to leave their land, which included a five-year-old boy along with his family. But unnatural incidents were awaiting when he returned to his own land after a long time. He had to face difficult situations and circumstances which led him to raise his voice against the prevailing social evils.

== Cast ==
- Sreejith Ravi as Maramkothi
- Poojitha Menon as Priyamvadha Thamburatti
- Tini Tom as Sakthan Thamburan
- Kulappulli Leela as Marutha Maria
- Santhakumari
- Soniya Malhaar
- Mamukkoya
- Kochu Preman
- Chali Pala
- Indrans
- Jayan Cherthala
- Ullas Pandalam
- Nelson
- Jeeja Surendran
- Rini Raj as Anima

== Music ==
The soundtrack for the film was composed by Mathew T Itty, with lyrics written by the director Baby Thomas.

No.	Title	Singer(s)	Length
1.	"Maram Kothikkothikkothi Nilkkum"	Chorus, Franco Simon	4:37
2.	"Onnu Thottu Mriduvaay Neeyannu"	K.S Chithra	3:59
3.	"Kaalapperumazha Peythozhiye"	P.Susheeladevi	3:36
4.	"Raathriyaayi Yaathrayaayi"	K.J. Yesudas	5:12
