= Mohabbath (2011 film) =

- Film poster
- Directed by: East Coast Vijayan
- Written by: Siddique Shameer
- Based on: Kalippavakal by Siddique Shameer
- Produced by: East Coast Vijayan
- Starring: Meera Jasmine
- Cinematography: Jibu Jacob
- Edited by: P. C. Mohanan
- Music by: S. Balakrishnan; K. A. Latheef
- Production company: East Coast Communications
- Distributed by: East Coast Release; Real Entertainments
- Release date: 28 April 2011
- Country: India
- Language: Malayalam

Mohabbath (transl. Love) is a 2011 Indian Malayalam-language romance film directed and produced by East Coast Vijayan. It was written by Siddique Shameer based on his novel Kalippavakal. The film stars Meera Jasmine, Munna and Anand Michael. The film features music by S. Balakrishnan, who makes his comeback through this film. Renowned singer Hariharan appears as himself in a song sequence while Roma does a cameo role.

The film concerns a love triangle between characters played by Meera Jasmine, Anand Michael and Munna. It reached theatres on 28 April.

== Cast ==
- Meera Jasmine as Sajna
- Anand Michael as Anwar
- Munna as Ameer
- Nedumudi Venu as Rasheed Haji
- Jagathy Sreekumar as Beerankutty
- Salim Kumar
- Ashokan
- Suresh Krishna as Subair
- Devan as Kabeer
- P. Sreekumar as Salim
- Beyon
- Shari
- Urmila Unni
- Lakshmi Priya
- Niranjan
- Nobi
- Arun
- Ajith
- Thejas
- Master Jeevan
- Sadhana
- Ambika Mohan
- Gayathri

== Production ==
The pooja of the film was held at East Coast Studio, Thiruvananthapuram, on 12 November 2010. The song recording was completed on 22 November 2010. The shooting of the film began at Vazhakala, Ernakulam, on 10 December 2010. Singer K. G. Jayan performed the camera switch-on ceremony. The production was completed in February 2011.

== Soundtrack ==
Music: S. Balakrishnan, K. A. Latheef; Lyrics: Vayalar Sarath Chandra Varma

1. "Atharu Peyyana" — Hariharan & Manjari
2. "Ente Padachavane" — Shankar Mahadevan & Afsal
3. "Thennalin Kaikal" — Hariharan & Manjari
4. "Chantham Thikanjoru" — Jyotsna
5. "Kanakalipiyil" — Unni Menon
6. "Thayimani Mulle" — Sujatha
7. "Atharu Peyyana" — Manjari & M. G. Sreekumar
8. "Chantham Thikanjoru" — Afsal
9. "Atharu Peyyana" (Remix) — Hariharan & Manjari
