= Sthreepadham =

Indian soap opera

- Genre: Soap opera Drama
- Created by: Joycee
- Based on: Sthreepadham by Joycee
- Screenplay by: John Paul Puthussery
- Story by: Joycee; Dialogues; John Paul
- Starring: Shelly Kishore; Vishnu prasad Subhash Nair; Ambili Devi; Arun.G.Raghavan; Recurring Cast : Naresh Eswar; Sabarinath; Lishoy
- Music by: Saanand George
- Country of origin: India
- Original language: Malayalam
- No. of seasons: 01
- No. of episodes: 715

Production
- Executive producer: Aneesh Unnithan
- Producer: Suresh Unnithan
- Running time: 22 minutes
- Production company: Sree Movies

Original release
- Network: Mazhavil Manorama
- Release: 17 April 2017 – 3 January 2020

Related
- Anuragam

Sthreepadham (ml; സ്ത്രീപദം) Malayalam is a television soap opera that ran on Mazhavil Manorama on Monday-Friday at 8:30 PM IST. Show is based on the novel Sthreepadham on Manorama weekly written by Joyci.This was a superhit serial and It marks come back of miniscreen actress Shelly Kishore after the hit Kumkumapoovu and Vishnu Prasad after Nandhanam /Vrindhavanam.

== Plot summary ==
Balasudha (Shelly Kishore) is the third daughter of Jaychandran Nair. Her siblings are Harikrishnan, Jayasudha and Ajayan. She is in a relationship with their family friend's son (with knowledge of the family) Sooraj (Arun G Raghavan) whose sister Preethi is Bala's best friend. Their marriage is fixed. Suddenly as a shock Jaychandran Nair loses all his properties and wealth and is forced to shift into a rental house. Their elder son Harikrishnan (Naresh Eswar) is forced to go to Kuwait to provide for the family. Due to family clashes between them Bala's and Sooraj's marriage is cancelled and they both part ways (despite their strong attempts to convince their families).

Balasudha tries to commit suicide but is saved on time. Her family starts seeing her as sort of a burden as they struggle with their income now. She is forced into an arranged marriage. Venugopan comes to meet Bala in an arranged function of the family and their marriage is fixed. Although Bala and her brother in law (Manoj) tries to convince her parents it didn't work out. Despite VenuGopan being a little too old and also not investigating much about him and his family Bala is forced to marry him.

After her marriage she moves in with Venugopan's house in Mulavukad. Her sad destiny continues as we learn that Venugopan and his brothers and alcoholics and that their mother (her Mother in law) is the root of all evils in the family. On her first day there Bala (who is a vegetarian) is forced to clean and cook raw meat and fish. Her sister in law (Anila - Venugopan's brother's wife) warns her about her life there (from this we can see that she is also a victim of constant physical and verbal attacks from her in laws).

On their first night Venugopan gets heavily drunk and he gets into their room. The lonely Bala is frightened and disgusted at Venu's actions. Unfortunately on that same night Bala gets raped by him. Every night Venugopan gets mad and he brutally tortures Bala as he is constantly paranoid searching for her 'jaran' (love affair). He blames her for cheating him by aligning her name with every single man she sees, including her brothers and father. Whenever they went to visit any of Bala's relatives Venugopan says Bala is in an affair with the males in her family and this continues day by day with the newspaper boy, milk boy, postman and which ever man Bala speaks to. The tortures continues as Bala slowly and painfully realise that Venugopan is not mentally well.

On the day Venugopan sets to go to Pune (as he works there) Bala tells him that she will resume her job as a teacher in the school near her parents’ house and he objects it by blaming that she's in a love affair with the male teachers of her school and beats her up. As Venu leaves Bala packs her bags and leaves for her house. There she sees her parents and brother (Ajayan) who sees her as a disturbance and refuses to fully believe what she says. They make several attempts to make her go back.

== Cast ==
=== Lead cast ===
- Shelly Kishore as Balasudha - Bala (Main Female lead)
- Vishnu Prasad as Venugopan - Bala's Husband (Main Male lead)(dead)
- Subhash Nair as Satheesh Gopan (Venu Gopan's elder Brother)
- Ambili Devi/Indulekha S as Preethi (Sooraj's sister and Bala's friend)
- Arun G Raghavan as Sooraj
- Parvathy Nair as Akhila V Gopan (Venu & Bala's daughter)
- Jishin Mohan as Vinu V Gopan (Venu & Bala's son)

=== Supporting cast ===
- Sreelatha Namboothiri as Jagadamma (Bala's mother-in-law) (Antagonist)
- Sumesh Surendran as Radhakrishnan/RK (Preethi's husband)
- Nikitha Murali as Jayalakshmi (Jayasudha's Sister)
- Sangeetha Sivan as Anila (Satheesh's wife)
- Greeshma Rajesh as Manoj's Daughter.
- Sabarinath as Manoj (Jayasudha's husband)
- Niranjan Nair as Sivaprasad (Bala's friend)
- Kalabhavan Jinto as Sumesh Gopan (Main Antagonist)
- Poojappura Radhakrishnan as Prabhakaran Nair (Bala's father in law) (dead)
- Amaljith as Jithu (Preethi & RK's son)
- Anitha Nair as ACP Jayasree IPS
- Alice Christy as Asha (Sumesh's wife)
- Lishoy as Jayachandran
- Ambika Mohan as Sudhalakshmi (Jayachandran's wife)
- Kavitha Lakshmi/Divya M Nair as Jayasudha Manoj (Bala's elder sister)
- Naresh Eswar as Harikrishnan
- Renith as Ajayan
- Manoj as Murali
- Niveditha as Lathika Sasidharan
- Kottayam Manju
- Ancy as Saradha
- Vijayakumari
- Aiswarya Rajeev as Divya (Hari's wife)
- Kumarokom Raghunath as Chameli's father
- Shruthy / Angel maria Joseph as Chameli (dead)
- Stella Raju as Karthyayani
- Roslin as Manoj's mother
- Geetha Nair as Radhakrishnan's mother
- Cherthala Lalitha
- Naveen Arakkal as CI Gopikrishnan
- Mohan Ayeroor as Isaac
- Nimmy Arun Gopan as Raji
- Maneesh Krishna as Ashokan
- Anumol as Priya
- Rishi as Anirudhan
- Mathew Thomas as Doctor (cameo)
- F J Tharakan (Cameo).
- Baby Christina as young Akhila
- Master Devadarshan as young Vinu
- Baby Fida
- Sithara
- Priya Vishnu
- Amboori Jayan as Sub inspector
- Aparna Nair as Rani
- KPAC Leelamani as Valyamma
- Tony as Dr.Vijayakumar
- Archana Menon as Shobhana
- Sindhu Jacob
- Rekha Ratheesh as Mallika Prathap (Cameo Appearance)
- Sebsin

== Broadcast history ==
The show started airing on Mazhavil Manorama on 17 April 2017 and It aired on Monday to Friday 7:00 PM IST. Later its timing changed Starting from Monday 5 June 2017, the show was shifted to 8:30PM IST time Slot.
