= Neelathamara (2009 film) =

2009 film by Lal Jose

- Directed by: Lal Jose
- Written by: M. T. Vasudevan Nair
- Produced by: Suresh Kumar
- Starring: Samvrutha Sunil; Rima Kallingal; Archana Kavi; Kailash; Suresh Nair; Jaya Menon; Tony Kattukaran; Amala Paul
- Cinematography: Vijay Ulaganath
- Edited by: Ranjan Abraham
- Music by: Vidyasagar
- Production company: Revathy Kalamandhir
- Distributed by: Playhouse International (India); PJ Entertainments (Europe)
- Release date: 27 November 2009
- Country: India
- Language: Malayalam
- Budget: ₹1.5 crores

Neelathamara (transl. The Blue Lotus) is a 2009 Indian Malayalam-language romantic drama film written by M. T. Vasudevan Nair and directed by Lal Jose. It is the remake of the 1979 film of the same name, scripted by M.T. himself and directed by Yusuf Ali Kechery. The film was produced by Suresh Kumar under the banner of Revathy Kalamandhir. It stars Kailash and newcomers, Archana Kavi and Amala Paul in the lead roles. The film received good reviews and was a box-office hit.

== Plot ==
Beena, a program producer with TV channel NDTV 24x7, is in her ancestral village for a television program. She wants her fiancé Anand to meet her grandmother, who has just been discharged from the hospital. Beena, the daughter of K.P. Haridas, who died a few years back, is not on good terms with her mother Ratnam over her second marriage. Ratnam happens to visit the house at the same time. There she meets Kunjimalu, a middle-age lady who was once a housemaid in her teenage days. Kunjimalu is welcomed by grandmother with the same warmth that she enjoyed long back, and she says that her daughters are now well settled and are leading happy lives. Ratnam is also affectionate towards Kunjimalu, who had once had an affair with Haridas.

In the night, while arranging the old books of Haridas, Ratnam comes across the snaps of Kunjimalu, which he had taken in his college days. She hands them over to Kunjimalu, which takes her back to the old days. The story switches to the late 1970s, when Kunjimalu had arrived as a maid with Appukuttan, her cousin and her grandmother. Kunjimalu succeeds in winning the heart of Haridas's mother in no time. She was an innocent village girl who always found fun in sharing secrets with Ammini, a girl of her age.

Ammini informs her about the myth of Neelathamara (blue lotus). According to believers, if they offer a one rupee note at the temple pond and prays deeply to the god, the flower will blossom the next morning and his/her wish will turn into truth. The arrival of Haridas, a final-year law student, adds more color to her life. He succeeds in alluring Kunjimalu in a short span, and they start to have a romantic and physical relationship. Kunjimalu believes that Haridas really loves her but she fails to understand that it was just fun that Haridas is looking for. Her prayer at the river pond results in blossoming of Neelathamara, which takes her to cloud nine. But news of the engagement of Haridas to Ratnam comes in as a shock, which breaks her down mentally. She slowly realizes that Haridas was never serious in his affair with her and tries to overcome the grief by silently serving Ratnam, his new wife. Ratnam one day learns of the affair and, when asked, Haridas replies casually, which makes her go berserk. Ratnam orders Kunjimalu to leave the house' she accepts silently. She is taken home by Appukuttan, whom she married.

Years later, Haridas is no more and both ladies have matured. The film ends with Kunjimalu once again with full heart preparing to take care of the octogenarian mother of Haridas.

== Cast ==
- Archana Kavi as Kunjimalu (Old Film - Ambika)
- Kailash as Haridas (Old Film - Ravi Kumar)
- Samvrutha Sunil as Rathnam (Old Film - Bhavani)
- Amala Paul as Beena
- Tony Kattukaran as Anand
- Rima Kallingal as Shaarathe Ammini (Old Film - Jayaragini)
- Sreedevi Unni as Maluamma (Old Film - Santha Devi)
- Suresh Nair as Appukuttan (Old Film - Sathar)
- Joy Mathai as Achuthan Nair (Old Film - Bahadoor)
- Jaya Menon as Elder Rethnam
- Parvathi T. as Elder Kunjimalu
- Mullanezhi as the old man sitting under the banyan tree

== Production ==
The performance of Archana Kavi also received positive remarks from both critics and masses. The main villain role was played by Suresh Nair, the younger brother of Ambika, which was originally portrayed by Sathar.

== Soundtrack ==
Neelathamara

Soundtrack album by Vidyasagar
- Released: 5 November 2009
- Recorded: Varshaa Vallaki Studios
- Genre: Feature Film Soundtrack
- Length: 19:59
- Language: Malayalam
- Label: Satyam Audios
- Producer: Vidyasagar

Vidyasagar chronology
Kanden Kadhalai (2009)	Neelathamara (2009)	Paappi Appacha (2010)

This film features a successful soundtrack composed by Vidyasagar with lyrics penned by Vayalar Sarath Chandra Varma. Vijay Prakash, famous through recent A. R. Rahman songs, was introduced to Malayalam through this film. The track "Anuraga Vilochananayi", sung by Shreya Ghoshal and V.Shreekumar (Shreekumar Vakkiyil), turned out to be one of the most successful songs of the year. It was the chart topper for many continuous weeks.

Vidyasagar won the Filmfare Award for Best Music Director and Mathrubhumi-Amrita Film Award for Best Music Director, for his work in the film. The track "Anuraga Vilochananayi" won the Most Popular Song of the Year Award at 2009 Vanitha Film Awards.

#	Title	Artist(s)	Length
1	"Anuraga Vilochananayi"	Shreya Ghoshal, Shreekumar Vakkiyil	4:36
2	"Neelathamare"	Karthik	4:24
3	"Pakalonnu"	Vijay Prakash, Balaram	4:51
4	"Entho Mudo"	Cherthala Ranganatha Sharma	2:57
5	"Needhaya Radha"	Cherthala Ranganatha Sharma	3:11

== Box office ==
The film was a commercial success.
