= Malamel =

- Town
- Location in Kerala, India Malamel (India)
- Coordinates: 8.9582°N 76.8640°E
- Country: India
- State: Kerala
- District: Kollam

Languages
  - Official: Malayalam, English
- Time zone: UTC+5:30 (IST)
- Vehicle registration: KL-

Malamel is a village in Pathanapuram Taluk in Kollam district, Kerala, India between Anchal and Valakom.
