= Gold Coins (film) =

- Theatrical release poster
- Directed by: Pramod G Gopal
- Written by: Pramod G Gopal
- Produced by: Neni Entertainment
- Starring: Dr Amar Ramachandran; Master Vasudev; Master Gopal; Sunny Wayne; Meera Nandan; Tessa Joseph
- Cinematography: Manju Lal
- Edited by: Sandeep Nandakumar
- Distributed by: Sopanam Entertainment
- Release date: 2017
- Country: India
- Language: Malayalam

Gold Coins is a 2017 Malayalam feature film written and directed by Pramod G Gopal, and starring Dr Amar Ramachandran, Master Vasudev, Master Gopal, Sunny Wayne, Meera Nandan, and Tessa Joseph in the lead roles. The film is a Neni Entertainments production and was released on 9 June 2017.

== Cast ==
- Dr. Amar Ramachandran as Dineshan
- Master Vasudev as Kichu
- Master Gopal as Achu
- Sunny Wayne as Katha
- Meera Nandan as Smriti Teacher
- Tessa Joseph as Sujatha
- Sai Kumar as Headmaster Lucko mash
- Hemanth Menon as Nihal
- Anil Nedumangad as Nazeer
- Raja Sahib as Charlie
- Sujith Sankar as Avanbhai
- Appunni Sasi as Anandan
- Joy Mathew as Bride father
- Saju Navodaya as Guide Gopan
- Master Adish Praveen as Rocket
- Master Rahul as Milma
- Master Abin as Thurumbu
- Master Aakash as Bottle
- Annop Chandran as announcer
- Jelbi Anna Augustine as Laya
- Baby Neha Amar as Nandana
- Baby Devaprabha as Anna
- Baby Aanmary as Aanmary
- Master Laxman as Pauly
- Nandan as Salman
- Aaron as Roney
- Saju Kodiyan as Auto driver Radhamani
- Munshi Venu as Hotel owner
- Purushu Kottayam as Dineshan Boss
- Majeed as Cycle shop owner
- Kunjikka as Koya mash
- Biju kodungallur as Toddy man
- Vinod kedamangangalam as Antony
- Dr.Justine as Gopi
- Shyam as Paraman
- Vishnu as Syed
- Boney as Chain hacker
- Akhil as democracy
- Saji as Bhagavan
- Satheesh chevayur as Giri
- Jose.P.Raphel as Tamil sales man

== Songs ==
- illillam (pathos) : P.Jayachandran
- illillam : K.S. Harisankar, Sneha Johnson, Albin Nelson...
- Hridhaya deepam : Baby Shreya

== Release ==
Initially the film was released 9 June 2017. Currently Movie is streaming on Saina Play - a Malayalam OTT Platform From 16 July 2021.
