= Mazhavil Manorama =

Indian Malayalam-language TV channel

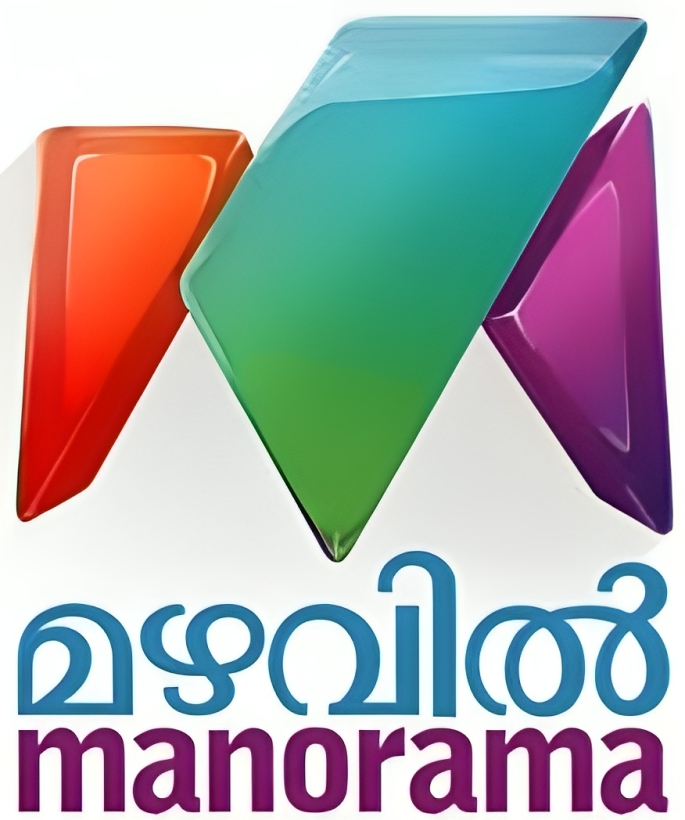
- Logo used since 2017
- Country: India
- Network: Malayala Manorama Television (MMTV)
- Headquarters: Aroor, Kerala

Programming
- Language: Malayalam
- Picture format: 1080p HDTV

Ownership
- Owner: Malayala Manorama

History
- Launched: 31 October 2011; 15 years ago

Links
- Website: Mazhavil Manorama

Availability

Streaming media
- ManoramaMax: India

Mazhavil Manorama is an Indian Malayalam language general entertainment Free-to-air television channel owned by Malayala Manorama. The channel's headquarters is at Aroor, Alappuzha in Kerala, India.

== History ==
The channel has been on air since 06:30 pm on 31 October 2011. The Malayala Manorama group was already into TV media through its Malayalam news channel Manorama News.

Mazhavil Manorama began broadcasting in high definition on 14 August 2015 as Mazhavil Manorama HD.

The channel has been airing the Vanitha Film Awards since 2012, and also launched Mazhavil Mango Music Awards in 2018 and the Mazhavil Entertainment Awards in 2019.

The Malayala Manorama Group launched its video-on-demand app ManoramaMAX that shows entertainment content and movies from the group's general entertainment channel, Mazhavil Manorama, as well as news from Manorama News, in addition to original online-only content. It was launched on 1 September 2019.

As of March 2023, Mazhavil Manorama has a YouTube handle with more than 10 million subscribers.

== Current shows ==
The following are the prime time shows which are being aired on the channel:

=== Currently broadcast series ===
Premiere date	Series Name
31 October 2011	Marimayam
7 October 2024	Super Kanmani
28 July 2025	Ottashikharam
2 November 2026	Kunjumaalakha
19 October 2026	Mukhachithram

=== Reality shows ===
Premiere date	Show Name
26 January 2026	Oru Chiri Iru Chiri Bumper Chiri 3

== Former shows ==
=== Available Serials ===
No.	Title
1	Aavani Nov 2022 - April 2023
2	Aksharathettu July 2020 - October 2020
3	Amala June 2013 - February 2015
4	Ammuvinte Amma March 2017 - July 2018
5	Aniyathi December 2014 - February 2015
6	Anuragam January - july 2020
7	Athmasakhi July 2016 - July 2018
8	Balamani March 2014 - June 2015
9	Balanum Ramayum April 2023 - January 2024
10	Bhagyadevatha November 2013 - October 2014
11	Bhagyajathakam July 2018 - March 2020
12	Bhanduvaru Shathruvaru - September 2015 - February 2016
13	Bhasi & Bhahadoor june 2016 - october 2017
14	Bhramanam february 2018 - october 2019
15	CBI Diary - 8 january 2018
16	Chackoyum Maryyum 21 october 2019 - 4 december 2020
17	Dr. Ram - july 2018
18	Dhathuputhri 2 february 2015 - 7 september 2015
19	Ennu Swantham Koottukari december 2014 - june 2015
20	Ente Kuttikalude Achan 29 march 2021 - 25 march 2022
21	Ente Pennu october 2014 - june 2015
22	Gayathridevi Ente Amma 21 july 2024 - 9 nov 2025
23	Hridayam Snehasandram 7 december 2020 - 15 july 2021
24	Ilayaval Gayathri 24 september 2018 - 10 may 2019
25	Ival Yamuna october 2014 - february 2015
26	Jeevithanouka march 2020 -march 2021
27	Kadhanayika january - november 2024
27	Kalyani november 2021 - july 2022
28	Krishnathulasi february 2016 - april 2017
29	Makkal 24 june - december 2018
30	Manjurukum Kalam february 2015 - march 2017
31	Mangalyapattu september 2016 - march 2017
32	Malootty december 2015 - july 2016
33	Marutheeram Thedi may - october 2019
34	Manjil Virinja Poovu march 2019 - july 2024
35	Mayamohini june - november 2015
36	Meenakshi Kalyanam march 2022 - january 2023
37	Meenu's Kitchen december 2024 - july 2025
38	Mani Muthu june 2023 - november 2024
39	Namam Japikunna Veedu october 2020 - july 2021
40	Nokketha Doorathu june 2017 - february 2018
41	Oru Penninte Kadha march 2013 - january 2014
42	Othiri Othiri Swapnangal 10 November 2025 - 2 November 2026
43	Ottachilambu october 2016 - june 2017
44	Parayan Mohicha Kadhakal january - march 2012
45	Pattu Saree october 2012 - july 2014
46	Pranayini february - july 2018
47	Priyapettaval november 2019 - august 2020
48	Pookkalam november 2024 - august 2025
49	Ponnambili november 2015 - october 2016
50	Rakkuyil november 2020 - march 2022
51	Ramayanam march 2012
52	Rani Raja october 2022 - june 2023
53	Selfie Family january - march 2026
54	Sthreepadham april 2017 - january 2020
55	Sundari june 2015 - september 2016
56	Suryakanthi august - november 2020
57	Swayamvaram - february 2023 - october 2024
58	Thatteem Mutteem june - december 2012
59	Thumbapoo october 2021 - february 2023
60	Ennum Sammatham january 2022 - april 2024
61	Archana Chechi LL.B april 2025 - june 2026

=== Privated Serials From (2011 - May/June 2014) ===
No.	Title
1	Aayirathil Oruval 2012 - 2013
2	Kadhayile Rajakumari 2011 - 2012
3	Indira 2012 -13
4	Malakhamar 2012
5	Manassu Parayunna Karyangal 2011 - 2012
6	Manasaveena 2011 - 2012
7	Oru Penninte Kadha 2013
8	Parinayam 2012
9	Saivinte Makkal 2011 -2012
10	Hridayam Sakshi - 2013

=== Dubbed Fiction ===
- Karnan (2017-2018)
- Mahashakthiman Hanuman (2018-2019)
- Pranayamazha (2022)
- Unnikannan (2025-2026)
- Dharmayoddhavu Garudan(2026)

=== Non-fictional ===
Reality shows

- Big Salute
- Bhima Jewels Comedy Festival (Season 1 & 2)
- Bumper Chiri Aghosham
- Bumper Chiri Unlimited Chiri
- Enteamma superaa
- D 4 Dance
- D2 - D 4 Dance
- D3 - D 4 Dance
- D 4 Dance Reloaded
- D 4 Dance Juniors V/S Seniors
- D 5 Junior
- Dhe chef
- Indian Voice (Season 1 & 2)
- Indian Voice Junior
- Kidilam
- Komedy Circus
- Kuttikalodano Kali
- Midukki
- Made for Each Other (Season 1,2)
- Minute To Win It
- Ningalkkum Aakaam Kodeeshwaran
- Onnum Onnum Moonu (Season 1,2,3,4)
- Oru Chiri Iru Chiri Bumper Chiri (Season 1 & 2)
- Paadam Namukku Paadam
- Paatile Tharam
- Panam Tharum Padam
- Super 4 (Season 1-3)
- The Great Family Challenge
- The Next Top Anchor
- Uggram Ujjwalam (Season 1 & 2)
- Udan Panam Season 1, 2, 3, 4, 5
- Veruthe Alla Bharya (Season 1-3)

Animated

- Mayavi

Other shows

- Amma Mazhavil / Nakashtrathilakkam / Ammamazhavil Kodiyettam
- Atham Pathu Ruchi
- Chayakkoppayile Kodumkaattu
- Cinemaa Chirimaa
- Dhe Ruchi
- Ee Ganam Marakkumo
- Europil Parannu Parannu
- Kanamarayathu
- Kadha Ithuvare
- Kaliyil Alpam Karyam
- Kusruthi Kudumbam
- Idavelayil
- Mittayi.com
- Orikkal Koodi
- Ithu Nalla Thamasha
- Ividingananu Bhai
- Hello Namaste
- Mazhavil Ruchi
- Prekshakare Avashyamunde
- Ruchi Vismayam
- Take It Easy
- Thakarppan Comedy 1,2
- Thakarppan Comedy Mahamela
- Chirimazha
- Snehathode Veetil Ninnnu
- Still Standing
- Super Kudumbam
- Vanitha
- First Print
- Innathe Cinema
- Puthu Chithrangal
- Tharathinoppam

== Channels & OTT Platform ==
Channel	Category	Notes
Mazhavil Manorama	General Entertainment	SD+HD
Manorama News	News	
Mazhavil Manorama International	General Entertainment	Dedicated channel for outside Indian Viewers.
ManoramaMAX	OTT Platform	
Radio Mango	Radio	
Onmanorama	News portal	
Manorama online	News portal	

== See also ==
- Mazhavil Entertainment Awards
