= P. S. Rafeeque =

Indian writer and lyricist

- Born: Kerala, India
- Occupations: Author; screenwriter; lyricist
- Years active: 2010 – present

P. S. Rafeeque (born 1978) is an Indian short story writer, screenwriter and lyricist from Kerala. He made his film debut by screenwriting Nayakan (2010). His breakthrough film was Amen (2013). In literature his notable works are Saddam's Barber, Kaduva (short story collections), Amen (screenplay), and Ummoommamapalam Kadanna Eppi (memoir collection). He also wrote the screenplays for the films Raja of Utyopya, Thrissivaperur Kliptham, Thottappan and Malaikottai vaaliban.

== Early life ==
Rafeeque was born in 1978 in Eriyad village in Kodungallur, Kerala, India, to Palliparambil Seythu and Kolliyil Kunjibeevathu. He is a graduate in English literature.

== Career ==
He made his film debut by screenwriting the action drama Nayakan (2010), directed by Lijo Jose Pellissery. It received positive reviews from critics. Rediff.com wrote that the film "not only grabs your attention by its originality of premise or treatment, but by its sincerity as well". They collaborated again in his second screenplay Amen (2013), a romantic drama, which he wrote based on a single line told by Pellissery. The film was a critical and commercial success. His screenplay for the 2019 film Thottappan was based on a Francis Noronha short story. Thottappan got the 50th state film award for best screenplay (adaption).

He collaborated with Pellissery for the third time for Malaikottai Vaaliban, a period drama about wrestling.

== Personal life ==
He is married.

== Filmography ==
Year	Title	Notes
2010	Nayakan	
2013	Amen	
2015	Utopiayile Rajavu	
2017	Thrissivaperoor Kliptham	
2019	Thottappan	
2024	Malaikottai Vaaliban	

== Discography ==
Year	Title	Notes
2013	Amen	
2014	Mosayile Kuthira Meenukal	
2015	Double Barrel	
2015	Utopiayile Rajavu	Also singer
2016	Darvinte Parinamam	
2017	Thrissivaperoor Kliptham	
2017	Gold Coins	
2017	Angamaly Diaries	
2018	Kali	
2019	Thottappan	
2021	Vaanku	
2024	Malaikottai Valiban	

== Awards ==
2025- The Padmarajan Awards for Best Short Story: Idamalayile Yakoob. His stories have received many awards like Bhasha Poshini Award, DC Books Award, Anganam Award, CV Sriraman Katha Award, Geetha Hiranyan Katha award. He won a Film Critics nomination for the song in Amen's Solomon and Shosanna. He won the 50th State Film Award for Best Screenplay for the film Thotappan.
