= K.K. Gopalakrishnan =

Indian art historian, writer, and photographer

K. K. Gopalakrishnan
- കെ. കെ. ഗോപാലകൃഷ്ണൻ
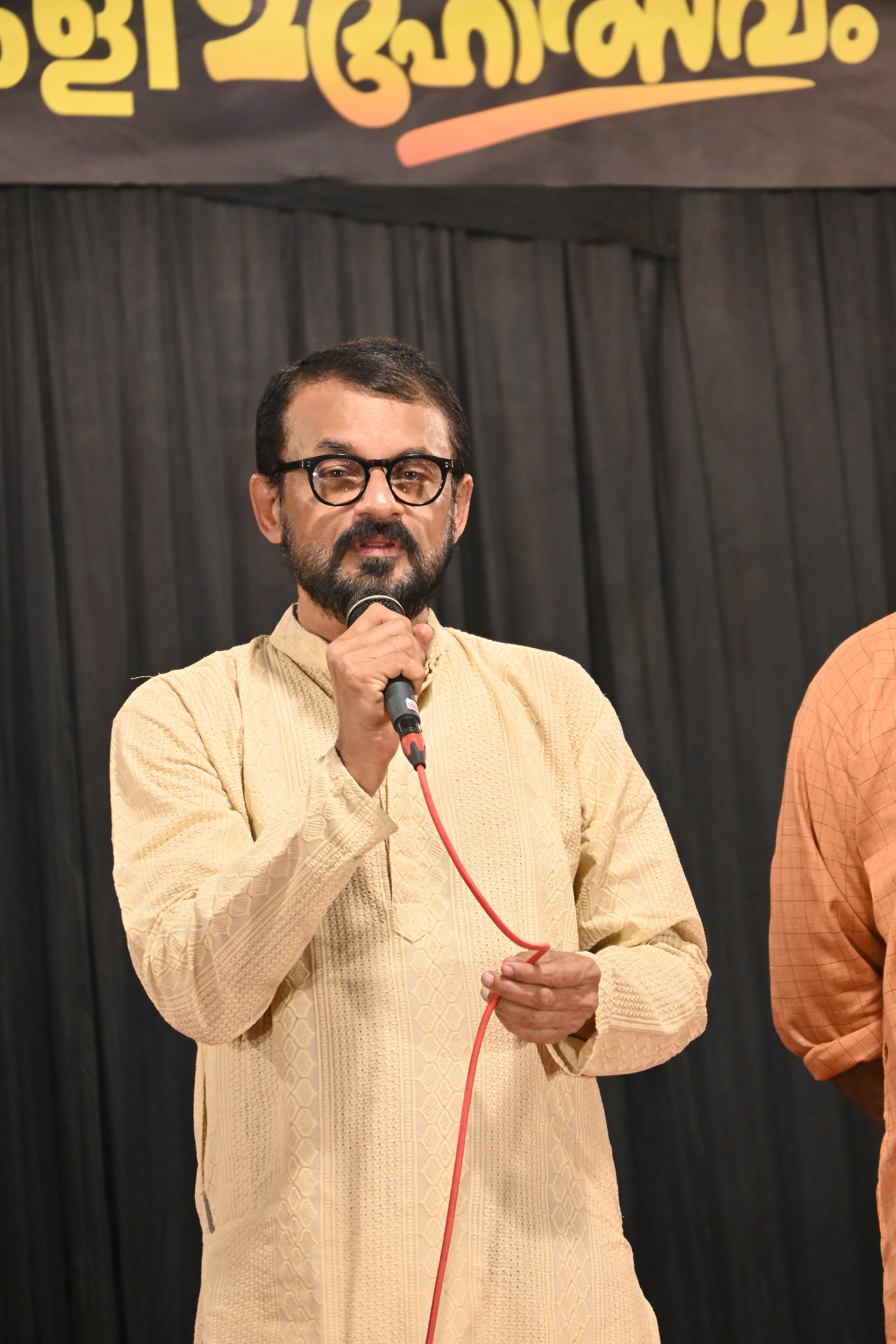
- K. K. Gopalakrishnan, at Mridangasyleshwari Temple, in 2025
- Born: Kamballoor Kottayil Gopalakrishnan; Kerala, India
- Occupations: Art historian, author, photographer, cultural administrator
- Employer: South Zone Cultural Centre
- Known for: Research and publications on Kerala performing arts (Kathakali, Theyyam)
- Notable work: Kathakali Dance–Theatre – A Visual Narrative of Sacred Indian Mime (2016); Theyyam: Indian Folk Ritual Theatre – An Insider's Vision (2024)
- Spouse: Pallavi Krishnan (m. 1994–present)
- Children: Priyamvada Krishnan
- Awards: Tagore National Research Scholarship (Ministry of Culture)
- Website: kkgopalakrishnan.in

K. K. Gopalakrishnan (also known as KKG) is an Indian art historian, author, photographer, and cultural administrator based in Kerala. He is noted for his extensive scholarship on traditional Malayali performing arts, particularly Kathakali and Theyyam. A recipient of the Tagore National Research Scholarship awarded by India's Ministry of Culture, Gopalakrishnan formerly served as Director of the Centre for Kutiyattam under the Sangeet Natak Akademi from 2010 to 2016.

As of 2024, he is the Director of the South Zone Cultural Centre, Thanjavur, and also holds additional charge as Director of the South-Central Zone Cultural Centre, Nagpur, both institutions under India's Ministry of Culture.

He is the author of Kathakali Dance–Theatre: A Visual Narrative of Sacred Indian Mime (2016) and Theyyam: Indian Folk Ritual Theatre – An Insider's Vision (2024), which explores themes of ritual, caste, and visual storytelling.

== Early life and education ==
K.K. Gopalakrishnan was born in Kerala, India. He developed an early interest in the ritual and classical arts of the region, particularly Theyyam and Kathakali, after encountering Theyyam performances during visits to Kannur and Kasaragod in his childhood. His exposure to these traditions influenced his academic and professional pursuits.

He completed his postgraduate studies in art history and aesthetics from Maharaja Sayajirao University of Baroda. He later earned a diploma in journalism and another in photography, equipping him with interdisciplinary tools to document and interpret visual culture.

As part of his research work, Gopalakrishnan undertook extensive field studies in North Kerala, focusing on the visual, ritual, and performative aspects of Theyyam. His academic training in aesthetics and his background in photography contributed to his visual documentation of traditional performance art, which later shaped his writing and filmmaking.

== Personal life ==
K.K. Gopalakrishnan was born into the Kamballoore Kottayil matrilineal family in Kerala, which has patronised the ritual art form Theyyam for over three centuries, including support for Muslim Theyyam performers and a mosque within the family estate. He recalls that his first exposure to Theyyam came as an infant, watching performances while seated on his maternal grandmother’s hip—an experience that deeply shaped his artistic perspective.

He married Pallavi Krishnan, a renowned Mohiniyattam dancer, in 1994. The couple has a daughter, Priyamvada Krishnan, who is an actress.

== Career ==
Gopalakrishnan authored Theyyam: Indian Folk Ritual Theatre — An Insider’s Vision, in which he analyzes Theyyam through multiple lenses, including anthropology, history, language, performance art, rituals, and folklore. He notes that his perspective is grounded in personal immersion and ongoing interactions with Theyyam performers throughout his life. His family estate is also associated with the origin of Pottan Theyyam, a symbolic resistance figure believed to have debated with Adi Shankara on caste and spiritual hierarchy.

Initially employed at the State Bank of India, Gopalakrishnan left his banking career to care for his ailing mother and transitioned into arts scholarship full time. He published a book on Kathakali, followed by an appointment as the Director of the Centre for Koodiyattam under the Central Sangeet Natak Akademi, where he served for six years. This tenure gave him practical insight into art management within governmental institutions.

He later briefly joined the Indira Gandhi National Centre for the Arts (IGNCA) before resigning to accept the Tagore National Scholarship, a two-year research fellowship from the Ministry of Culture, focusing on Koodiyattam. After completing the research and adapting his thesis into a publicly accessible book, he was appointed as the Director of the South Zone Cultural Centre (SZCC). In this role, he oversees initiatives that support folk, tribal, and endangered art forms across southern India, reinforcing state-sponsored cultural preservation.

=== Media ===
K. K. Gopalakrishnan has been widely interviewed and profiled by national and international media for his work on Theyyam and ritual arts. He was featured in a BBC News article that explored his family’s centuries-old tradition of hosting Theyyam performances. His work and book Theyyam: Indian Folk Ritual Theatre have also received attention in reviews and interviews published by Frontline, The Wire, and The Times of India, which described his efforts in contextualizing the deity-based performance art within social frameworks. In an interview with The New Indian Express, he discussed his motivations and challenges while documenting the art form.

=== Journalism ===
He wrote numerous news and entertainment outlets including The New Indian Express,The Hindu, etc. where he has written more than 15 articles.
