= Raghunath Paleri =

Indian novelist and screenwriter (born 1954)

Raghunath Paleri (born 7 February 1954) is an Indian novelist, screenwriter, director and actor from Kerala.

== Career ==
He has directed three films—Onnu Muthal Poojyam Vare (1986), Vismayam (1998), and Kanneerinu Madhuram (unreleased); and in television, eight episodes of Bible Ki Kahaniya (1993–1995). He entered the Malayalam film industry in 1978 and has worked in Tamil film industry.

His debut work with the producer Nirmal of Minerva Studio did not release at that time. Later Nirmal produced another film Naseema which got released in 1983 was written by Paleri. He found his way in acting as Adruman, a blind man, in Thottappan directed by Shanavas K. Bhavakutty.

== Filmography ==
Year	Title	Credit	Notes
1983	Naseema	Screenplay	
1983	Charam	Story	
1984	My Dear Kuttichathan	Screenplay	
1985	Onathumbikkoru Oonjaal	Screenplay	
1986	Neram Pularumbol	Screenplay	
1986	Onnu Muthal Poojaym Vare	Director; Screenplay	Directorial debut
1988	Ponmuttayidunna Tharavu	Screenplay	
1989	Piravi	Screenplay	Co-writers: Shaji N. Karun, S. Jayachandran Nair
1989	Mazhavil Kavadi	Screenplay	
1991	Ennum Nanmakal	Screenplay	
1991	Kadinjool Kalyanam	Screenplay	
1992	Ezhara Ponnana	Screenplay	
1992	Ennodishtam Koodamo	Screenplay	
1993	Arthana	Screenplay	
1993	Meleparambil Aanveedu	Screenplay	
1994	Santhanagopalam	Screenplay	
1994	Pingami	Screenplay	
1994	Swaham	Screenplay	Co-writers: Shaji N. Karun, S. Jayachandran Nair
1994	Vadhu Doctoranu	Screenplay	
1995	Sindoora Rekha	Screenplay	
1995	Mangalam Veettil Manaseswari Gupta	Screenplay	
1996	Swapna Lokathe Balabhaskaran	Screenplay	
1998	Vismayam	Director; Screenplay	
1999	Vanaprastham	Screenplay	Co-writer: Shaji N. Karun
2000	Devadoothan	Screenplay	
2000	Madhuranombarakattu	Screenplay	
2003	Magic Magic 3D	Screenplay	Co-writer: T. K. Rajeev Kumar
2003	Swapnam Kondu Thulabharam	Screenplay	
2005	Banglavil Outha	Screenplay	
2006	Madhuchandralekha	Screenplay	
2010	Dus Tola	Screenplay	Hindi film
2019	Thottappan	Actor	
2022	Naaradan	Actor	
2022	Lalitham Sundaram	Actor	
2023	Vedikettu	Actor	
2023	Neeraja	Actor	
2023	O.Baby	Actor	
2023	Maharani	Actor	
2024	Kanneerinu Madhuram	Director; Screenplay	Completed in 2012, not released
2024	Oru Kattil Oru Muri	Screenplay; Actor	
2025	Am Ah	Actor	
2025	Dominic and the Ladies' Purse	Actor	
2025	Officer on Duty	Actor	
2025	Lokah Chapter 1: Chandra	Actor	
2025	Sarvam Maya	Actor	
2025	Bouma	Actor	

== In print media ==
Raghunath Paleri has authored several books in Malayalam language. His published works include:

- Ananda Vedam
- Vismayam Pole
- Etho Rathriyude Pakal
- Arundhathiyude Nagarathil
- Akasathekkoru Jalakam
- Avasyamillatha Achanammamar
- Orkkunnuvo En Krishnaye
- Raghunath Paleriyude Kathakal (short stories by Raghunath Paleri)
- Sooryagayathri
- Avar Moovarum Oru Mazhavillum
- Onnu Muthal Poojyam Vare
- Ponumuttayidunna Tharavu
- Kanneerinu Madhuram
- Ezham Nilayile Aakasham
- Paleri Puranam
- Aaltharayile Nilavettangal

== Awards ==
- 2021: Kendra Sahitya Akademi Award for Children's Literature for Avar Moovarum Oru Mazhavillum
- 2021: Kerala Sahitya Akademi Award for Children's Literature for Avar Moovarum Oru Mazhavillum
