= Amen (2013 film) =

2013 Indian film

- Film poster
- Directed by: Lijo Jose Pellissery
- Written by: P. S. Rafeeque
- Story by: Lijo Jose Pellissery
- Produced by: Fareed Khan
- Starring: Fahadh Faasil; Indrajith Sukumaran; Kalabhavan Mani; Swathi Reddy
- Cinematography: Abinandhan Ramanujam
- Edited by: Manoj
- Music by: Prashant Pillai
- Production company: Whitesands Media House Production
- Distributed by: Kochin Talkies
- Release date: 22 March 2013
- Running time: 159 minutes
- Country: India
- Language: Malayalam
- Budget: 35 million

Amen is a 2013 Indian Malayalam-language musical fantasy romantic comedy directed by Lijo Jose Pellissery and written by P. S. Rafeeque from a story by Pellissery. The film revolves around the events in a picturesque Kuttanad village, following the arrival of a young priest and a pair of star-crossed lovers. The film stars Fahadh Faasil, Indrajith Sukumaran, Kalabhavan Mani, and Swathi Reddy (in her Malayalam debut). The film's songs and background score was composed by Prashant Pillai.

The film was released on 22 March 2013, receiving widespread positive reviews from critics. The film was also a commercial success at the box-office.

== Plot ==
The plot revolves around the lives of a few people around an ancient Syrian church in a Kuttanadan village called Kumarankari. Solomon is in love with Shoshanna who is the daughter of a wealthy contractor. Solomon is a failed band member however he is the son of the famous Estapan, who was renowned in Kerala for his clarinet playing abilities, and died in a boat accident.

Fr. Vincent Vattoli comes to the church as a new recruit to the parish. He learns about the relationship and tries to unite the couple. At this time, the marriage of Shoshanna gets fixed. Solomon attempts to elope, in vain. They are caught by Shoshana's parents and Solomon is mercilessly beaten up.

The people of Kumanamkari and the neighboring town then place a bet in which the St. George's band has to win in order for Solomon's marriage to occur. It was said that Shoshanna would be married to Solomon if they win the competition with Solomon leading the band.

The band takes intense practices and wins the bet, while Solomon's band master, Louis Paapan dies. At that night Shosana's father backs out of the bet. Him, the evil old parish priest and Solomons uncle are haunted at night by St. George at the time when they were destroying the church. They all came to the realisation that Solomon had divine powers on his side and they stood aside from Solomon's life as obstacles.

Solomon marries Shosana and the band continues to participate in other competitions. Later a call comes to the church informing that the new Priest Fr. Vincent Vattoli is taking charge. The Kumarangiri folks now come to know that Fr. Vincent Vattoli was actually the Saint George himself who appeared in front of them.

== Cast ==
- Fahadh Faasil as Solomon
- Indrajith Sukumaran in a dual role as :
  - Fr. Vincent Vattolli
  - Allegedly St. George in disguise
- Kalabhavan Mani as Louis Paapan
- Swathi Reddy as Shoshanna
- Nandu as Philipose
- Rachana Narayanankutty as Clara
- Joy Mathew as Fr. Abraham Ottaplakan
- Sunil Sukhada as Kappiyar Kochousep
- Chemban Vinod Jose as Paily
- Anil Murali as Thommeni Davis
- Makarand Deshpande as Chevalier Pothachan
- Sandra Thomas as Mariyama
- Sasi Kalinga as Chachappan
- Rajesh Hebbar as Esthappan (Asan_
- Sudheer Karamana as Mathachan
- Sudhi Koppa as Sebastian (Clara's lover)
- Chali Pala as Mathews
- Kulappulli Leela as Therutha
- Nisha Sarang as Leenamma, Mathachan's Wife
- Natasha Sahgal as Michelle
- Kainakary Thankaraj as Chali Pappan
- Jayasanker Karimuttam as Vishakol Pappy
- Shobha Singh as Solomon's Mother
- V K Unnikrishnan as Kamlasanan Engineer
- Rukmini Amma as Shoshanna's Grandmother
- Vinod Calicut as Vikraman
- Gokulan as Coconut Tree Climber
- Nimral Benny

== Production ==
The film is scripted by PS Rafeeque, who also wrote Lijo's debut feature film Nayakan (2010). Abinandhan Ramanujam is the cinematographer who also wielded the camera for The Postman on YouTube, a national award winning non-feature film from Chennai and shot the vivid TV series for MTV, The Rush.

Indrajith was selected play the role of Father Vincent Vattolli, the young priest of a church in a village called Kumaramkari. This film is the actor's third film with Lijo after stellar performances in the critically acclaimed Nayakan and City of God (2011). Fahadh Faasil plays the other lead character named Solomon, who is in love with Shoshanna. Shoshanna is played by Andhra Pradesh-born actress Swathi Reddy, known for her role in the Tamil film Subramaniapuram. Meanwhile, scriptwriter-turned-actor Natasha Sahgal, plays the part of a French lady, come to study the music and local culture.

== Soundtrack ==
Amen

Soundtrack album by Prashant Pillai
- Released: 2013
- Genre: Feature film soundtrack
- Label: Mathrubhumi Music
- Producer: Prashant Pillai

Prashant Pillai chronology
| David (2013) | Amen (2013) | 5 Sundarikal (2013) |

All lyrics are written by Kavalam Narayana Panicker except where noted; all music is composed by Prashant Pillai.

| No. | Title | Lyrics | Artist(s) | Length |
|---|---|---|---|---|
| 1. | "Aathmavil" | | Kavita Mohan, Shweta Mohan, Preeti Pillai, Sankar Sharma |
| 2. | "Karuthiku Thithai" | | Sopanam Anil, Sopanam Satheesh, Nithin Raj, Sankar Sharma |
| 3. | "Meen" | | Alyssa Mendonsa |
| 4. | "Pampara Pa Pa" | | Sopanam Anil, Sopanam Satheesh, Remya Nambeesan, Nithin Raj |
| 5. | "Ee Solomanum Shoshannayum" | P. S. Rafeeque | Preeti Pillai, Shreekumar Vakkiyil |
| 6. | "Spirit of Amen" | | Sankar Sharma, Alphons Joseph, Prashant Pillai |
| 7. | "Vattolli" | | Lucky Ali |

== Awards ==
- 2013 - Kerala State Film Award for Best Costume Designer - Siji Thomas Nobel
- 2013 - Kerala State Film Award for Best Art Director - M. Bawa
- 2013 - TTK Prestige-Vanitha Film Awards - Most Popular film
- 2013 : Kerala Film Critics Association Awards - Best Popular film
- 2013 : 16th Asianet Film Awards 2014 - Best Music Director - Prashant Pillai

== Release ==
Amen reached theatres on 22 March 2013, receiving positive reviews from critics. It was declared as a blockbuster.

=== Critical reception ===
Upon its release, Amen received widespread positive reviews from critics. Paresh C Palicha of Rediff.com stated that Amen is "brilliant" and concluded that "Director Lijo Jose Pellissery can be proud of making a brilliant film that has an intelligent story, a multi-layered screenplay, excellent cinematography and powerful performances from the actors." Aswin J Kumar of The Times of India gave the movie 3.5 stars in a scale of 5, stating that "In Amen, director Lijo Jose Pallisserry dabbles in a newly-found realm. He does the act joyfully with a tinge of absurdity and he derives laughter that sometimes wobbles on sheer madness. The good part is that the joy stays, warm and pleasant, all through the film."

Jo of Malayala Manorama gave the film a favourable review praising the cinematography of Abinandhan Ramanujam and direction. Mathrubhumi's entertainment website mb4frame also wrote a positive review saying 'Amen is visually and technically brilliant. Sify.com gave the movie a verdict of "brilliant" and concluded the review, saying that "When most films move out of your mind minutes after you leave the theaters, Amen just grabs you in a fantastic way. It has its flaws for sure, but just don't miss this gem. Two big thumbs up and a must watch recommendation for Amen!"

Smitha of Oneindia.in also gave the movie 3.5 stars and recommended to watch the movie "only if you enjoy watching different and experimental cinema." Veeyen of Nowrunning.com gave the movie 3 stars out of 5 and appreciated the movie, commenting that "The flavor, spirit and fun of Amen make it buoyantly unpretentious, and the sheer exuberance that it lets out renders it a movie of the magical kind. A feel-good, jovial and unfussy musical experience, it's a sunny gem of a film that drops down from the heavens above, as the Lord parts the clouds to take a look at the world down below."

=== Box office ===
Amen was commercial success at the Kerala box office. On 12 May, IBN Live reported that the film has made a clear profit of ₹ 30 million in 50 days. Amen completed 100 days in theatres across Kerala. Overall it had a gross of ₹ 8.12 crore with a satellite right of ₹ 2.90 crore and ₹ 2.7 million as other rights.

== Remake ==
There were reports that it is to be remade in Bollywood with Ranbir Kapoor playing the lead role.
