= Vismayam (1998 film) =

- Directed by: Raghunath Paleri
- Screenplay by: Raghunath Paleri
- Starring: Dileep; Innocent; Sreenivasan; K. P. A. C. Lalitha; Rajan P. Dev
- Cinematography: Venugopal
- Edited by: K. Shankunni
- Music by: Johnson
- Production company: CC Cine Vision
- Distributed by: CC Cine Vision
- Release date: 8 April 1998
- Country: India
- Language: Malayalam

Vismayam is a 1998 Indian Malayalam-language dark comedy drama film written and directed by Raghunath Paleri and produced by CC Cine Vision. The film stars Dileep, Innocent, Sreenivasan, K. P. A. C. Lalitha and Rajan P. Dev in lead roles. It features music composed by Johnson. This film is the first in Malayalam to have a magical realism element in narration.

== Plot ==
Dinakaran and Radha are the children of retired teacher Narayanan Master and his late wife Ammini, whose memory continues to give Narayanan strength as he hopes to see Radha married. Narayanan is also involved in a land dispute with the wealthy Thumbassery Kurup over the place where Ammini was cremated. When Radha's marriage to Sahadevan is being arranged, thieves sent by Kurup steal the gold jewellery the family had saved for the wedding and try to make Sahadevan appear responsible so that the marriage will be stopped. Kurup also arranges for Chandrappan to marry Chinnammini on the same astrologically lucky date set for Radha's marriage, forcing a mutual business agreement with Rugmini's uncle, Chinna Kurup. Angered by Thumbassery Kurup's actions, Dinakaran and former village officer (Adhikari) decide to strike back with the villagers' by taking back their property that Kurup has stored in a warehouse for sale abroad. Dinakaran and several villagers attempt to steal the warehouse keys, recover the stolen goods, and return them to their owners.

During the attempt to obtain the keys, Dinakaran saves Chinnammini when she tries to take her own life and brings her to his home. Since most of the villagers do not know her, they rename her Chinnammini and claim she is the daughter of Narayanan's fictional sister, using the identification papers of Kochukrishnan's daughter, who died as a child. Dinakaran and Chinnammini soon fall in love while she continues living under this false identity. After Chinna Kurup's mother dies, he regrets his earlier actions and reconciles with R Chinnammmini, which also brings his family and Dinakaran's family closer together. Thumbassery Kurup becomes furious over this alliance and stabs Chinna Kurup, but the villagers intervene and the men from Kurup's family are arrested. In the end, the marriages of Dinakaran and Chinnammini and of Radha and Sahadevan are held at the same venue, and Narayanan sees the spirit of his late wife Ammini as the family celebrations take place.

== Cast ==
- Dileep as Dinakaran
- Innocent as Narayanan Master
- Sreenivasan as Sahadevan
- Rajan P.Dev as Thumbaseery Kuruppu
- Cochin Haneefa as Janardhana Kuruppu
- Jose Pellissery as P.C Kochukrishnan
- Jagathy Sreekumar as S.I Muhammed Parakkal
- Oduvil Unnikrishnan as Adhikari
- Sreedurga as Chinnammini/Rugmini
- K. P. A. C. Lalitha as Kochammini
- Manka Mahesh as Ammini
- Amitha Sebastian as Radha
- Mukundan as Chandrappan
- Kozhikode Narayanan Nair as Chinna Kurupp
- Zeenath as Valsala
- Spadikam George as D.S.P Ambujaksha Kuruppu
- Bindu Panicker as Sathyabhama
- Kalabhavan Haneef as Nalinakshan
- Kochu Preman as Rama Kurup
- Poojappura Radhakrishanan as Panicker
- Lakshmi Krishnamoorthy as Chinna Kurup's mother and Rugmini's biogical grand mother
- Kunjandi as Shankaran Mesthari
- Meena Ganesh as Sahadevan's Mother

== Soundtrack ==
The music was composed by Johnson and lyrics was written by S. Ramesan Nair and Raghunath Paleri.

No.	Song	Singer(s)	Lyrics	Length
1	"Ezhaam Nalu" (Male voice)	K. J. Yesudas	S. Ramesan Nair	
2	"Ezhaam Nalu" (Female voice)	K. S. Chithra	S. Ramesan Nair	
3	"Kothichathum"	M. G. Sreekumar	S. Ramesan Nair	
4	"Kunkuma Poo	K. J. Yesudas, K. S. Chithra	S. Ramesan Nair	
5	"Mookkilla Naakkilla"	Johnson	Raghunath Paleri	
