= Priyamvada Krishnan =

Indian film actress and dancer (born 1998)

- Born: 21 February 1998 (age 28); Punkunnam, Thrissur, Kerala
- Occupations: Actress, model, classical dancer
- Years active: 2019–present
- Known for: Breakout roles in Thottappan (2019) and Narivetta (2025)
- Notable work: Thottappan, Rorschach, Oru Kattil Oru Muri, Narivetta
- Parents: K.K. Gopalakrishnan (father); Pallavi Krishnan (mother)
- Awards: 50th Kerala State Film Award – Special Mention

Priyamvada Krishnan (born 21 February 1998) is an Indian actress, model, and classical dancer who primarily works in Malayalam cinema. She made her screen debut in the 2019 film Thottappan, for which she received Special Jury Mention at the Kerala State Film Awards. Her breakthrough came with her role in the 2025 film Narivetta, where she garnered praise for her portrayal in the widely acclaimed song "Minnalvala".

She was also nominated for Best Female Debut – Malayalam at the 9th South Indian International Movie Awards.

== Early life and education ==
Priyamvada Krishnan was born on 21 February 1998 in Punkunnam, Thrissur. She is the daughter of writer K.K. Gopalakrishnan and renowned Mohiniyattam dancer Pallavi Krishnan, who also served as her classical dance mentor. She was educated at Hari Sri Vidya Nidhi School and at Devamatha CMI Public School in Thrissur. She then did her B.Sc. degree in Visual Communication at the SRM Institute of Science and Technology in Chennai.

== Career ==
Priyamvada Krishnan made her screen debut in the Malayalam drama Thottappan (2019) in which she portrayed Sarah alongside Vinayakan and Roshan Mathew. Critics singled out her performance as "bold" and authentic, with Gulf News describing it as a "breakout" role for the newcomer.

Following her debut, she took on supporting roles in Rorschach (2022) and Oru Kattil Oru Muri (2024), steadily building her profile. In 2025, she achieved wider acclaim for her role in Narivetta, particularly for her performance in the popular song "Minnalvala", which received widespread attention on social media platforms. The impact of Narivetta extended beyond personal acclaim—it sparked discussion of land rights and tribal issues in mainstream cinema, and The Week praised her chemistry with Tovino Thomas and noted her "agency and sincerity" as Varghese’s girlfriend. She also appeared in the 2025 family drama Samshayam, furthering her career in Malayalam cinema. In the same interview, Priyamvada stated that "acting was never about chasing fame… every role… deserves preparation and dedication," highlighting her focus on depth and sincerity in character portrayal.

Narivetta also attracted attention for its portrayal of land rights struggles. According to The News Minute, the film’s depiction of the Muthanga struggle "was noted for sparking renewed attention to Adivasi land rights and state allocation issues."

== Filmography ==
Year	Title	Role	Notes	Ref(s)
2019	Thottappan	Sarah		
2022	Station 5	Padma Teacher		
2022	Rorschach	Ammu		
2022	Thattassery Koottam	Athira		
2023	Divorce	Anju		
2024	Oru Kattil Oru Muri	Madhumiya		
2025	Idi Mazha Kattu			
2025	Samshayam	Faiza		
2025	Narivetta	Nancy		
2025	Vilayath Buddha	Cholaykkal Chaithanya		
