= Tejaswini Prakash =

Indian actress

- Born: 17 December 1987 (age 38); Bengaluru, Karnataka, India
- Occupations: Actress; model
- Years active: 2005–present
- Spouse: Phani Varma Nadimpally (m. 2022)
- Children: 1

Tejaswini Prakash Nadimpally (born 17 December 1987) is an Indian actress and former model who predominantly appears in Kannada films and television. She has also appeared in Telugu and Tamil films.

After beginning her career as a model, Tejaswini made her acting debut in 2005 with the Tamil film, Ambuttu Imbuttu Embuttu. Her Kannada debut came two years later with Masanada Makkalu (2007) and gained recognition for her performances in films such as Maathaad Maathaadu Mallige (2007) and Gaja (2007). For her performance in Goolihatti (2015), she was awarded the SIIMA Award for Best Supporting Actress — Kannada.

Tejaswini made her television debut in 2016 with the titular character in Niharika. In 2017, she participated in the fifth season of the reality television show Bigg Boss Kannada. She later received recognition for portraying Lavanya in the television series Nannarasi Radhe (2020–2022).

== Early life ==
Tejaswini was born on 17 December 1987 in Bangalore as the only child of Prakash (died 2020), a stuntman and stunt coordinator in Kannada films, and Vinaya, a television actress. Her father hailed from Mandya and her mother from Mangalore. While Kannada was spoken in her paternal family, her maternal family spoke Konkani. Tejaswini is fluent in both languages.

Tejaswini initially had no ambitions of becoming an actress and aspired to be an air hostess. Recalling her early years, she said, "Initially, I was unsure about acting, and I never dreamt of becoming an actress but when I finally started, acting was all I was doing!" Her entry into films was influenced by cinematographer Ashok Kashyap, who encouraged her to pursue acting as a career, after he filmed her for a pilot episode of a television series that was never aired.

== Career ==
Tejaswini began her career as a model. In 2005, she made acting debut came with the Tamil film, Ambuttu Imbuttu Embuttu. In 2007, she appeared in her first Kannada film, Masanada Makkalu; the performance earned her the SICA Best Actress Award. In the drama Maathaad Maathaadu Mallige (2007), she played Jaji, the youngest daughter of a flower farmer (played by Vishnuvardhan). She then appeared in Gaja (2007) and Aramane (2008). Tejaswini would go on to appear in a few Telugu films such as Cut Chesthe (2014), Cine Mahal - Rojuki 4 Aatalu (2017), Prathikshnam (2017) and Kannulo Nee Rupamey (2018).

In the crime drama Goolihatti (2015), Tejaswini played a strong-willed Poorni from a traditional middle-class family, who finds her life entangled with a village youth drawn into Bengaluru's criminal underworld, forcing her to confront violence and threats to her family's future. The reviewer for Deccan Herald wote, "Doff your hats and raise a toast to Tejaswani. This diminutive damsel is the real hero of Gooli Hatti." The performance won her the award for Best Supporting Actress — Kannada at the 5th South Indian International Movie Awards.

Tejaswini's debut in Tamil films came with Shankar's Manal Naharam (2015). She made her television debut with the 2016 series Niharika. In 2017, she appeared as a contestant in the fifth Season of the reality television show Bigg Boss Kannada. She withdrew from the show mid-way after her father was critically ill. Tejaswini returned to films with a role in Roberrt (2021), headlined by Darshan, who she had previously worked with in Gaja. She then appeared in Garadi (2023).

== Personal life ==
Tejaswini married Phani Varma Nadimpally, a businessman, on 20 March 2022 in a traditional Hindu ceremony in Bengaluru. In December 2023, she gave birth to their daughter, Anvika Varma.

== Filmography ==
=== Films ===
- All films are in Kannada, unless otherwise noted.

Year	Title	Role(s)	Notes	Ref.
2005	Ambuttu Imbuttu Embuttu	Abhirami	Tamil film	
2006	Aishwarya	Shwetha		
2007	Masanada Makkalu		SICA Best Actress Award	
2007	Gaja	Varalakshmi		
2007	Ee Preethi Yeke Bhoomi Melide	Vaishali		
2007	Maathaad Maathaadu Mallige	Jaji		
2007	Savi Savi Nenapu			
2008	Bandhu Balaga	Annapoorna		
2008	Aramane	Neetha		
2010	Jotheyagi Hithavagi	Navya		
2010	Tarangini	Radhika		
2010	Preethi Nee Heegeke	Sapna		
2010	Kiladi Krishna	Anjana		
2013	Nanda Gokula	Sathyabhama		
2014	Kalyanamasthu	Radha		
2014	Cut Chesthe		Telugu film; credited as Tanishka	
2015	Mr. Premi			
2015	Goolihatti	Poorni	Credited as Tejaswini Gowda; SIIMA Award for Best Supporting Actress – Kannada	
2015	Manal Naharam	Thanishka	Tamil film	
2016	Nithya Jothe Sathya	Nithya		
2016	Dieyana House	Diana		
2017	Cine Mahal – Rojuki 4 Aatalu		Telugu film	
2017	Prathi Kshanam		Telugu film	
2018	Kannullo Nee Roopame		Telugu film	
2021	Roberrt	Bride		
2023	Garadi			

=== Television ===
Year	Title	Role	Notes	Ref.
2016–2017	Niharika	Niharika		
2017	Bigg Boss Kannada	Contestant	Season 5; withdrew on day 28	
2020–2022	Nannarasi Radhe	Lavanya		
2022	Yediyur Shree Siddhalingeshwara	Kali		
