= Goolihatti =

- Theatrical release poster
- Directed by: Shashank Raj
- Starring: Pavan Surya; Tejaswini Gowda; Mamatha Rauth
- Cinematography: R. V. Nageshwara Rao
- Edited by: Sanjeeva Reddy
- Music by: Ravi Basrur
- Release date: 26 June 2015
- Country: India
- Language: Kannada

Goolihatti is a 2015 Indian Kannada-language film directed by Shashank Raj. Pavan Surya, Tejaswini Gowda and Mamatha Rahuth in lead role, produced by Kiran Kumar M. G. It was theatrically released on 26 June 2015.

== Cast ==
- Pavan Surya as Pavan Kumar "Pacchi"
- Tejaswini Prakash as Poorni (credited as Tejaswini Gowda)
- Mamatha Rahuth
- Arun Bhagath
- Raghav Nag
- Mahesh
- Appu Venkatesh
- Rangayana Raghu as Mylari
- Avinash as Poorni's father
- Doddanna as Doddanna
- Sharath Lohithaswa
- Mico Nagaraj
- Adi Lokesh
- Swayamvara Chandru
- Sharashchandra
- Honnavalli Krishna
- Sudha Belawadi as Poorni's mother
- M. N. Lakshmi Devi as Poorni' grandmother

== Production ==
Filming was completed on 12 August 2014.

== Reception ==
=== Critical response ===
A reviewers of Vijaya Karnataka wrote "The director who wins in capturing the Mylaralinga Jatra, stumbles while making the scenes. A song heard at bad times, amidst loud background music, Goolihatti does not remain in the mind". A reviewer of Deccan Herald says "Sadly, minus subtle, but spiritedly etched Poorni, though her fights are rendered comedic, and her well-rounded family we empathise with, Shashankar Raj’s Gooli Hatti, is the pits". Sunayana Suresh from The Times of India wrote "This film is for those who like their dose of masala films, for it has the staple action, romance, comedy and item number. For the rest, you could skip it".
