= Thottappan =

- Promotional Poster
- Directed by: Shanavas K Bavakutty
- Written by: P.S. Rafeeque; Francis Noronha
- Produced by: Devadas Kadancheri; Shailaja Manikandan
- Starring: Vinayakan; Dileesh Pothan; Priyamvada Krishnan; Roshan Mathew
- Cinematography: Suresh Rajan
- Edited by: Jithin Manohar
- Music by: Leela L. Girish Kuttan; Justin Varghese
- Release date: 5 July 2019 (location)
- Running time: 140 minutes
- Country: India
- Language: Malayalam

Thottappan (transl: Godfather) is a 2019 Malayalam drama film directed by Shanavas K Bavakutty. It depicts the affection between a girl and her godparent. It is an adaptation of the short story "Thottappan" by Francis Noronha.

== Plot ==
When his partner in crime goes missing, a small-time crook dedicates himself to raising the daughter his friend left behind. Two small-time thieves Jonappan and Ithaq share a special bond and live by doing crooks as demanded by some people. On a certain endeavour in which ithaque was not present, Jonappan goes missing. After the incident Jonappan's wife remains speechless and behaves insensitively to their daughter Sarah which leads ithaq to take care of her as a father, whom she affectionately calls as 'thottapan'(godfather).The subsequent events in the island after the entrance of a strange youngster leads to a touching climax.

== Cast ==
- Vinayakan as Ithakk
- Dileesh Pothan as Jonappan
- Priyamvada Krishnan as Sarah
- Roshan Mathew as Ismail
- Manoj K. Jayan as Fr. Peter
- Manju Pathrose as Patricia
- Binoy Nambala as Bernard
- Sunitha as Mary
- Raghunath Paleri as Adhruman
- Manu Jose
- Lal
- Davinchi Santhosh

== Release ==
The Times of India gave the film a rating of three-and-a-half out of five stars and stated that "The well etched out characters and the bittersweet ending does make for a compelling storytelling and an endearing visual experience. And that makes Thottappan a definite treat for a movie enthusiast". The Hindu wrote that "Thottappan builds up slowly, drawing you in with the promise of a knockout punch which never comes. Maybe that's how they intended it to be".
