= Nannarasi Radhe =

Indian television drama

- Genre: Drama
- Written by: Yasha.M.Shetty
- Directed by: Vinod Dhondale, Shivu Poojenagrara
- Presented by: Sreenivas H.D. Kote
- Starring: Abhinav Vishvanathan; Kaustuba Mani; Sihi Kahi Chandru; Tejaswini Prakash
- Opening theme: Radhe Radhe Nannarasi Radhe
- Country of origin: India
- Original language: Kannada
- No. of episodes: 668

Production
- Executive producers: Hema. V. Bellur, Geetha Vinod, Poornima Deepak Naidu
- Producer: Vardhan
- Production location: Bangalore
- Cinematography: Anjan Channasandra
- Editor: M.Manu
- Camera setup: Multi-camera
- Running time: 9:30 PM
- Production company: Vridhi Creations

Original release
- Network: Colors Kannada
- Release: 3 February 2020 – 23 September 2022

Nannarasi Radhe is a Kannada language television drama that premiered on Colors Kannada channel on 3 February 2020. Episodes are also streamed on Viacom's online platform Voot. It stars Abhinav Vishwanathan and Kaustuba Mani as protagonists. It received the Best Serial Award in 2021 Anubandha Awards.

== Plot ==
A series of events brings Inchara to Agastya Enterprises, where Agastya Rathod, whom she detests, works. They both have secrets, but Agastya discovers Inchara's secret and blackmails her into acting as his girlfriend to achieve his dream of settling in America. As they pretend to be a couple, they become closer as friends. Agastya seeks Inchara's help in finding his biological mother, and she promises to assist him. Inchara uncovers the secret of Agastya's mother but agrees not to reveal it based on a promise to his father, Santhosh Rathod. The reason behind Inchara's agreement remains a mystery.

During Janamashtmi celebrations at the Rathod Mansion, Agastya and Inchara's fake love story is exposed, causing tension between the families. Inchara's mother vows to find a wealthier family for her daughter's marriage within 15 days. Inchara's marriage is arranged with Rishab, but Agastya persistently tries to uncover his mother's secret and attends all the wedding rituals. At the wedding ceremony, Agastya unexpectedly marries Inchara, leaving everyone shocked. Agastya challenges Inchara's family to let him stay for seven days and convince her to accept him. If she rejects him after seven days, he will sign an annulment paper and leave her life. Eventually, Inchara's mother accepts their marriage.

Agastya decides to leave the house to search for his mother but is stopped when the truth about his mother is revealed. He apologizes to his father, and Shravan's true identity is exposed. Inchara vows to make Agastya fall in love with her. During Shreya's wedding, a fight breaks out, and Agastya and Inchara end up marrying for the third time. Inchara questions Agastya about his reasons for marrying her, but he promises to reveal it later. They attend Shreya's wedding as the real bride and groom. Ashwini, who was locked up by Indrani, is discovered to be the daughter of Santhosh and Vaidehi. However, it is revealed that Indrani has been deceiving Ashwini about her true parentage.

Lavanya returns, having faced hardships, and Inchara and Lavanya uncover Ashwini's true background. Ashwini overhears a conversation revealing the lies told to her by Indrani. Indrani attempts to poison the family, but her plan is exposed, leading to her arrest. Inchara faints and reveals she is pregnant, and the series concludes with her baby shower.

== Cast ==
- Abhinav Vishwanathan as Agastya Rathod-Vaidehi's son; Santosh Rathod's step son; Vaidehi's son; Ashwini's half brother; Inchara's husband; Sudha and Sathish's nephew; Lavanya, Urvi and shivam's step cousin.
- Kaustuba Mani as Inchara Agastya Rathod-Agasthya Rathod's wife; Sunitha's elder daughter; Apoorva's elder sister; Ravi's niece; Tarun and shivani's cousin.Rishab's ex-fiancée .
- Sihi Kahi Chandru as Santhosh Rathod- Vaidehi husband; Agasthya's step father;Ashwini's father; sudha and sathish's brother;
- Hema V Bellur as Vaidehi -Santosh Rathod's wife; Agasthya and Ashwini's mother; Indrani and Hemaraju's half sister.
- Amoolya Gowda as Ashwini -Santhosh & Vaidehi's Daughter;Agasthya's half sister; Lavanya, Urvi and shivam's cousin;Sudha and Sathish's niece.
- Vyjayanthi Kashi as Sudha -Santhosh& Satish's sister;Lavanya's Mother;shravan's mother in law; Vaidehi and meenakhi's sister in law; Agasthya, shivam, Urvi and Ashwini's aunt.
- Tejaswini Prakash as Lavanya -Agastya's step cousin; Sudha's Daughter; Shivam, Urvi and Ashwini's cousin; shravan's wife; Santosh and Sathish's niece.
- Arun Kumar as Sharavn- Lavanya's Husband;Sudha's son in law;
- Pradeep Chandra Kuthpady as Sathish Rathod; Santosh & Sudha's Brother; Meenakshi's Husband; Shivam and Urvi's father; Ashwini, Lavanya and Agastya's uncle.
- Veena Rao as Meenakshi Rathod;Sathish's wife; Shivam and Urvi's mother;
- Sahana Shetty as Urvi Rathod -Sathish and Meenakshi's daughter; Agastya's step cousin;Shivam's sister; Ashwini and Lavanya's cousin; Sudha and santhosh's niece.
- Padmini as Sunitha -Inchara's & Apoorva'smother;Ravi's younger sister; Tarun and shivani's aunt;Agastya's mother in law.
- Shravyagowda as Apoorva "Appu"Vaidya Inchara's younger sister; Sunitha's Daughter;Ravi's niece. Tarun and shivani's cousin. Agastya's sister in law.
- Raghavndera as Ravi -Sunitha's Brother; Mohini's Husband; Tarun and shivani's father; Inchara and Apoorva's uncle.
- Akshata Radhakrishna as Mohini -Ravi's wife; Tarun and shivani's mother; Sunitha's sister in law; Inchara and Apoorva's aunt.
- Viharika Pooja as Shivani -Ravi and Mohini's daughter; Inchara and Apoorva's cousin;Tarun's sister; Sunitha's niece.
- Arfath Shariff as Tarun -Ravi and Mohini's son; Inchara and Apoorva's cousin;Shivani's brother; Sunitha's nephew.

== Adaptations ==
Language	Title	Original release	Network(s)	Last aired	Notes
Kannada	Nannarasi Radhe ನನ್ನರಸಿ ರಾಧೆ	3 February 2020	Colors Kannada	23 September 2022	Original
Gujarati	Jode Rejo Raaj જોડે રે'જો રાજ	6 June 2022	Colors Gujarati	25 March 2023	Remake
Odia	Tu Raja Mun Rani	10 June 2024	Tarang TV	Ongoing	Remake
