= Manal Naharam =

2015 Indian film by Shankar Panikkar

- Promotional poster
- Directed by: Shankar
- Written by: M.I. Vasanthkumar
- Story by: Muraliraman
- Produced by: M.I. Vasanthkumar
- Starring: Shankar; Prajin; Gautham Krishna; Tejaswini Prakash; Varuna Shetty; Vinod Kumar; Jaise Jose; Jijesh Menon
- Cinematography: J.Sreedhar
- Music by: Rinil Gowtham
- Release date: 27 February 2015
- Running time: 127 minutes
- Country: India
- Language: Tamil

Manal Naharam is a 2015 Indian Tamil-language film written and produced by M.I.Vasanthkumar and directed by Shankar starring himself, Prajin, Gautham Krishna, Tejaswini Prakash, Varuna Shetty, Vinod Kumar (VK), Jaise Jose and Jijesh Menon.

The film was dubbed in Malayalam as Sand City, which was released on 2 January 2015. Manal Naharam was released on 27 February 2015.

== Plot ==
Manal Naharam explores the stories of young Indians who travel to Dubai for better jobs and futures, leaving behind their families. The movie deals with friendship and romance.

Mansur (Prajin), a sales commission agent in Dubai is in love with Poornima (Tanishka), a waitress at a restaurant. Anand (Gautham), in search of a job, is loved by Nisha (Varuna Shetty), the daughter of business tycoon Ibrahim Rabbani (Shankar). James (Jaise Jose), the third person in the group, gets into trouble that complicates things for everyone.

== Cast ==
- Shankar as Ibrahim Rabbani
- Prajin as Manzoor
- Gautham Krishna as Aanand
- Tejaswini Prakash as Thanishka
- Varuna Shetty as Nisha
- Vinod Kumar (VK) as Mohan Raj
- Jaise Jose as James
- Jijesh Menon as Noushad
- Sakshi Sharma as Fathima
- Rex George
- "Engal Aasan" Raamki as Gopalakrishnan
- Dubai Kannan
- "Caravan" Arunachalam
- Kaadhal Saravanan
- Muraliraman
- Rajesh B
- Master Ashwanth

== Production ==
Shankar was impressed by the story line given by his friend Muraliraman from Dubai. M.I.Vasanthkumar wrote the screenplay and produced the film. Gautham Krishn, Prajin and Tejaswini Prakash were cast in the lead roles. Newcomer Varuna Shetty and Narayana Kannan from Dubai.

Renil Gowtham, the music director of Shankar' s directorial debut Virus was signed for music department, while J.Sreedhar, who has worked on Challenge 2 was assigned the cinematography.

The preliminary schedule of the film took place in Chennai in March 2013, before the crew left for the remainder of the shooting in Dubai. "The 50-day shooting was very tough and challenging", said Shankar.

== Music ==
Manal Naharam's audio was launched on 14 July 2014 at RKV Studios, Chennai attended by the cast of both Manal Naharam and the team of the directors first Tamil feature Oru Thalai Ragam as they celebrated the 34 year reunion of that film's release. Roopa, Shankar, Thyagu, Kailash, cameraman Rajasekhar (Rajasekhar-Robert) and T. Rajendar spoke on the occasion. The Malayalam dubbed version Sand City's audio was launched on 15 October at The Oberoi, Dubai attended by the entire cast and crew of Sand City. Apart from the team, actor Rizabawa also spoke on the occasion.

Manal Naharam

Film score by Rinil Gowtham
- Genre: Feature film soundtrack
- Length: 24:48
- Language: Tamil

Tamil Soundtrack

No.	Song	Singers	Lyrics
1	"Nadhi Pokum Dishai..."	Hari Hara Sudhan	Tamil Amudhan
2	"Usharaiah Usharu..."	Anitha	Tamil Amudhan
3	"Theeyaga Theeyaga..."	Sulfiq L.	Tamil Amudhan
4	"Vaan Mazhai..."	V. V. Prasanna	Raaj Kannan
5	"Kanava Nijama..."	V. V. Prasanna & Reshma	Mani Bharathy

Malayalam (Dubbed) Soundtrack

No.	Song	Singers	Lyrics
1	"Oru Yatra Mozhi..."	Anwar Sadath	Neha Gayal
2	"Usharaiah Usharu..."	Anitha	Tamil Amudhan
3	"Theechoodi Theechoodi..."	Sulfiq L.	Rinil Gowtham
4	"Njan Oru Minnal Kodi..."	Sulfiq L.	Chitoor Gopi
5	"Manasil Mazhaiyai..."	Anoop Shankar & Sitara	Sibi Padiyera

== Reception ==
Maalai Malar gave 71 marks out of 100 for Manal Naharam appreciating the film as attractive. They lauded director Shankar's effort in presenting the film in a touching manner. The technical side of the film, especially songs, cinematography, background score and dialogues were also appreciated. Thanishka and Varuna Shetty along with villain actor Vinod Kumar (VK) and Prajin' s performances were commended. Malini Mannath of The New Indian Express praised the screenplay, acting and the direction in Shankar's Tamil directorial debut.

A critic from The Times of India rated the Malayalam dubbed version as average and appreciated the photography of the film, summing up as "the film could have been much better if treated well".
