= Spadikam George =

Indian film actor

George Antony (Spadikam George)
- Born: Changanasserry, Kerala, India
- Occupation: Actor
- Years active: 1992–present
- Spouse: Thresiamma George
- Children: 5

George Antony, popularly credited as Spadikam George is an Indian actor who primarily works in Malayalam films. He came to the limelight with the 1995 film Spadikam, after which his name was preceded by the name of that film. George's performance in the film won him good reviews as his antagonist role opposite Mohanlal was an unprecedented success. The Role in the Movie Lelam as Kadayady Baby is his another important role. In Lelam he is one of the main antagonagists having more power.Even though he never got another author-backed role, he has done important characters including comic roles in his later releases.

George has also done prominent roles in documentaries, the most notable being Messenger, a short film produced by the De Paul Public School in Kottayam which is under the ownership of the Vincentian Family.

== Personal life ==
He is married to Thresiamma. The couple have five children, Ashwathi, Anu, Ajo, Anjali and Anju. They are settled in Bangalore.

== Filmography ==
Year	Title	Role	Notes
1989	Swantham Ennu Karuthi		
1990	Marupuram	Jayakrishnan Menon	
1991	Post Box No. 27		
1993	Kanyakumariyil Oru Kavitha		
1993	Chenkol	Keerikkadan Thomas	
1994	Pakshe	Revenue Minister Chacko	
1994	Moonnam Loka Pattalam	Antappan	
1995	Puthukkottayile Puthumanavalan	Sreedharanunni	
1995	Thumbolikadappuram		
1995	Saadaram	Police Officer	
1995	Highway	IG	
1995	Spadikam	Kuttikkadan	
1996	Azhakiya Ravanan	Himself	
1996	Aayiram Naavulla Ananthan	Jacob	
1996	Yuvathurki	S.I Paasha	
1996	Sathyabhaamaykkoru Pranayalekhanam	Chandrasekhara Varma	
1996	Kinnam Katta Kallan		
1996	The Prince	Rajasekharan	
1996	Man Of The Match	Krishnakumar	
1996	Swarnakireedam	Sethurama Iyer	
1997	Manthra Mothiram	George Antony	
1997	Swantham Makalkku Snehapoorvam		
1997	Superman	CI Jagannathan	
1997	Ancharakalyanam		
1997	Ikkareyanente Manasam	Pattalam Raghavan	
1997	Poomarathanalil	Sethunath	
1997	Moonu Kodiyum Munnooru Pavanum	Gunda Lazer	
1997	Lelam	Kadayadi Baby	
1998	Vismayam	D.S.P. Ambujaksha Kurup	
1998	Elavamkodu Desam	Idicheman	
1998	Meenakshi Kalyanam		
1999	Vazhunnor	Parakkadan Andrews	
1999	Udayapuram Sulthan	Udayapuram Sreekanta Varma	
1999	The Godman	G. K. Krishnan	
1999	Crime File	Cardinal Carlose	
1999	Ezhupunna Tharakan	Padmanabhan	
1999	Panchapandavar	Sunnychan	
1999	Olympiyan Anthony Adam	IG Kora	
1999	Onnaamvattam Kandappol		
1999	Aakasha Ganga	Maanikkasheri Thampuran	
1999	Pathram	SP Thomas Vazhakkali	
2000	Aanmuttathe Angalamar	Hareendran Nair	
2000	India Gate	Vavachan	
2000	Ival Draupadi		
2000	Rapid Action Force	Chief Minister	
2000	Narasimham	Kalletti Vasudevan	
2000	Sathyameva Jayathe	ADGP Mohandas IPS	
2000	Thenkasipattanam	Devarajan	
2001	Nariman	Thomas Philipose	
2001	Nagaravadhu	Sivanandan	
2001	Koodariyathe		
2001	Ee Nadu Innale Vare		
2001	Rakshasa Rajavu	DYSP Siddharthan	
2001	Thenthulli		
2002	Puthooramputhri Unniyarcha	Aringodar	
2002	Thaandavam	Kuruvilla Alex	
2002	Randu Penkuttikal		
2002	Adheena		
2002	Kanalkireedam		
2002	Kunjikoonan	Lakshmi's father	
2003	Swantham Malavika	Thomas John	
2003	Mazhanoolkkanavu		
2003	Cheri		
2004	Priyam Priyamkaram		
2004	Natturajavu	Ouseppu	
2004	Vettam	SI Lambodharan	
2004	C. I. Mahadevan 5 Adi 4 Inchu	DYSP	
2004	Kusruthi	Carlos	
2004	Thalamelam	Jabbar's Uncle	
2004	Kanninum Kannadikkum	Himself	
2005	Thaskara Veeran	Itty	
2005	Isra	Wills Pappachan	
2005	Boy Friend		
2005	Maanikyan		
2005	Chandrolsavam	Kurien	
2006	Pothan Vava	Antochan	
2006	Ashwaroodan	Theeppori Thampi	
2006	Arunam		
2006	The Don	DYSP Anirudhan	
2006	Keerthichakra	Krishnakumar	
2006	Highway Police	Chandra Das	
2006	Rashtram	ACP Adiyodi	
2006	Balram vs. Tharadas		
2007	Mayavi	Police Officer	
2007	Avan Chandiyude Makan	CI Shivanandan	
2007	November Rain (2007 film)	Saravanan	
2007	Chocolate	Balachandran	
2007	Hallo	Vadakkancherry Vakkachan	
2008	Roudram	Veerabhadra Kurup	
2008	Kovalam	Ratnakaran Nair	
2008	Mohitham		
2009	Pramukhan		
2009	Ee Pattanathil Bhootham	P.R.O. Ramanathan	
2010	Yakshiyum Njanum	Meledathu Madhavan	
2011	Raghuvinte Swantham Raziya		
2011	Happy Darbar		
2011	Manushyamrugam	George	
2012	Simhasanam		
2012	Vaidooryam		
2012	Mayamohini	SP Raghavan	
2012	The King & the Commissioner	DSP Koshy	
2013	Proprietors: Kammath & Kammath	Varkeychan	
2013	Blackberry		
2013	Police Maman	S.P. Anand Kumar	
2013	My Fan Ramu		
2015	Moonam Naal		
2018	Lolans		
2018	Carbon	Sebastian	
2018	Shikkari Shambhu	Mathews	
2018	Abrahaminte Santhathikal	Jacob	
2018	Chalakkudikkaran Changathi		
2019	Kuttymama		
2019	Neermathalam Pootha Kalam		
2019	Prasnapariharashala		
2019	Brother's Day		
2019	Aakasha Ganga 2	Maanikkasheri Thampuran	Archieve footage only
2020	Aalkoottathil Oruvan		
2022	Pathonpatham Noottandu	Diwan Peshkar	
2022	Kumari	Velyachan	
2024	Pavi Caretaker		
2025	Bazooka		
2026	Sukhamano Sukhamann		

== Television ==
- 2000 - Snehanjali (Asianet)
- 2004 - Kadamattathu Kathanar (Asianet)
- 2017 - Nilavum Nakshtrangalum (Amrita TV)
- 2018 - CBI Diary (Mazhavil Manorama)
- 2019 - Sumangali Bhava (Zee Keralam)
