= Malaikottai Vaaliban =

2024 Indian film by Lijo Jose Pellissery

- Theatrical release poster
- Directed by: Lijo Jose Pellissery
- Screenplay by: P. S. Rafeeque
- Story by: Lijo Jose Pellissery
- Produced by: Shibu Baby John; Achu Baby John; Vikram Mehra; Siddharth Anand Kumar; M. C. Philip; Jacob K. Babu
- Starring: Mohanlal; Sonalee Kulkarni; Hareesh Peradi; Danish Sait; Manoj Moses; Katha Nandi; Manikandan R. Achari
- Cinematography: Madhu Neelakandan
- Edited by: Deepu S. Joseph
- Music by: Prashant Pillai
- Production companies: John & Mary Creative; Century Films; Maxlab Cinemas and Entertainments; Saregama; Amen Movie Monastery
- Distributed by: Century Films (India); Phars Film Company (overseas); Aashirvad Cinemas Co. LLC (overseas)
- Release date: 25 January 2024
- Running time: 156 minutes
- Country: India
- Language: Malayalam
- Budget: ₹60–65 crore
- Box office: est.₹30 crore

Malaikottai Vaaliban (transl. Youngster from the Mountain Fort) is a 2024 Indian Malayalam-language epic period fantasy action drama film directed by Lijo Jose Pellissery and written by P. S. Rafeeque from a story by Pellissery. The film stars Mohanlal in a dual role, alongside Sonalee Kulkarni, Hareesh Peradi, Danish Sait, Manoj Moses, Katha Nandi and Manikandan R. Achari in supporting roles. It was jointly produced by John & Mary Creative, Century Films, Maxlab Cinemas and Entertainments, Saregama and Amen Movie Monastery.

Pellissery wrote the initial story during the COVID-19 pandemic and later expanded it to a narrative that transcends time and space. He worked with P. S. Rafeeque to develop the script. The film was announced on 25 October 2022 by Shibu Baby John, marking the first collaboration between Pellissery and Mohanlal. Tinu Pappachan served as the associate director. Principal photography spanned approximately 130 days from January to June 2023, covering locations in Rajasthan, Chennai, and Pondicherry. The music was handled by Prashant Pillai, while the editing and cinematography were handled by Deepu S. Joseph and Madhu Neelakandan respectively.

Malaikottai Vaaliban was released in theatres worldwide on 25 January 2024, coinciding with the Republic Day weekend. The film received mixed reviews from critics and praised the cinematography, art direction, production values and performances (especially that of Mohanlal), while criticism was aimed at the direction, screenplay, editing and fight sequences. It was a box office bomb.

== Plot ==
Malaikottai Vaaliban, an undefeated aged drifting warrior, establishes himself as a hero reigning over a vast desert region. Vaaliban travels with mentor/father figure, Ayyanar, and his son, Chinnappaiyyan, who energizes the crowd with drums and chants during Vaaliban's arena fights. Vaaliban is an orphan, whom Ayyanar had adopted when he was a newborn from the hands of his deceased mother. Vaaliban proceeds to Adivaarithur for his next fight, where they encounter a lady named Jamanthipoovu, who limps in front of them and requests for a ride on their cart since she cannot walk.

Chinnappaiyyan and Ayyanar agree to take her with them and she accompanies them on their journey. In Adivaarithur, Vaaliban defeats the reigning champion following the customary practice of claiming the ex-champion's house and wife as his own house and wife. After a brief stay there, Vaaliban encounters a dancer, Rangapattinam Rangarani, at a betting parlour in Nooraanathalayur. Vaaliban also clashes with Chamathakan, blocking his advances. Angered and humiliated, Chamathakan challenges Vaaliban to a fight in his village, Mangodu, against their most powerful fighter, Mangottu Mallan. The next morning, Vaaliban arrives at Mangodu to fight him. Despite Chamathakan's family's deceitful tactics, Vaaliban emerges victorious, stripping them of their honor. In retaliation, Chamathakan embarks on a killing spree out of shame, seeking revenge against Vaaliban.

Meanwhile, Vaaliban returns to Ambathoor Malaikottai, where he began his journey, and challenges the Portuguese fighter king, Macaulay Maharaj, to take over his reign. However, Chamathakan, seeking vengeance, poisons Vaaliban before the fight with Maharaj and Lady Macaulay as a duo, temporarily blinding him, which leads to him being captured by the Portuguese soldiers. Miraculously, he recovers the next day and defeats the Portuguese, with the help of the slaves of Ambathoor, who were liberated by Rangarani's aid, Thenamma. Later that night, outside of Malaikottai, Rangarani proposes to Vaaliban, who rejects her proposal and tells her that he cannot love anyone. Hearing this, she becomes heartbroken and reveals this to Thenamma, who starts scheming evil things in her mind and promises to help her make Vaaliban fall in love with her.

Celebrating their victory, they all stop for the Thiruchenthooru festival, where Jamanthi reveals to Vaaliban that she is pregnant with Chinnappaiyyan's child. He is overjoyed when he hears this and wishes good health and prosperity to the child and Jamanthi. Rangarani eavesdrops and hears the conversation, but misunderstands the child's father to be Vaaliban, judging by the way Vaaliban spoke to Jamanthi. Rangarani reports this to Thenamma, who puts her plan in action. She speaks to Chinnappaiyyan and tells him that Jamanthi is pregnant with Vaaliban's child, which angers him and sets out to kill Vaaliban.

During the temple festivities, while they are all celebrating, Vaaliban senses Chamathakan's presence in the crowd and attempts to find Chamathakan, but in vain. Vaaliban senses that he might be near Jamanthi and races towards her to protect her, but due to the huge crowd present there, Vaaliban is not able to make it in time and he kills her. While mourning Jamanthi's death, Vaaliban senses Chamathakan's presence in the crowd once again. He sees a person coming to attack him and stabs the person multiple times. Though Vaaliban thinks that he has killed Chamathakan, it is revealed to be Chinnappaiyyan, whom Vaaliban could not recognise as they were all wearing face masks.

Chamathakan considers his revenge fulfilled and leaves the area. These events drive a wedge between Vaaliban and Ayyanar. Ayyanar pledges vengeance and declares him as his sworn enemy. While wandering away, Ayyanar comes across Chamathakan and they share a drink. He reveals to Chamathakan that Vaaliban is not an orphan as he was previously made to believe, but the son of his mutant fighter rival, Malaivettai Vaaliban. Malaivettai had defeated Ayyanar and took his wife with him, as a result of which, he became Malaivettai's servant. Soon, Ayyanar's ex-wife became pregnant with Vaaliban; Malaivettai left her to conquer the world, leaving her under the care of Ayyanar in the monsoon season. As soon as he was born, Ayyanar murdered his ex-wife and abducted him to train him as a weapon against his own biological father. Ayyanar poisons Chamathakan and wanders off into the desert. The film ends with the revelation of Ayyanar revealing that the fighter, which he will bring to fight against Vaaliban will be his own father, paving way for the sequel.

== Cast ==
- Mohanlal in a dual role as:
  - Malaikottai Vaaliban
  - Malaivettai Vaaliban, Vaaliban's biological father
- Sonalee Kulkarni as Rangapattanam Rangarani (voice dubbed by Grace Antony)
- Hareesh Peradi as Ayyanar
- Danish Sait as Chamathakan
- Manoj Moses as Chinnappayyan
- Katha Nandi as Jamanthipoovu (voice dubbed by Parvathy babu)
- Manikandan R. Achari as Slave
- Hariprashanth M G as Kelu Mallan
- Shanta Dhananjayan as Ponnurumi Veeramma
- Sanjana Chandran as Thenamma
- Harikrishnan S. as Mangottu Mallan
- Suchithra Nair as Madhangi
- Andrea Ravera as Macaulay Maharaj
- Diana Nasonova as Lady Macaulay
- Rajeev Pillai as Bodyguard
- Deepali Vashistha as Dancer
- Murugan Martin as Slave
- Krishnankutti Nair Shivakumar Sopanam as translator

== Production ==
=== Development ===
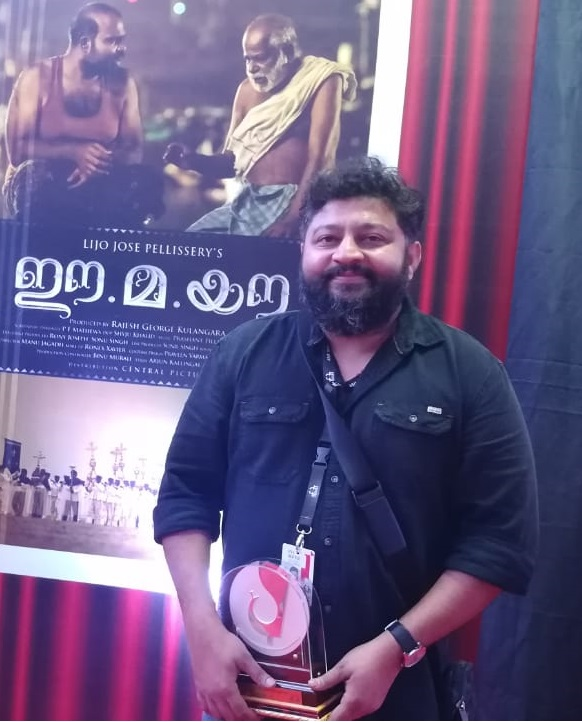
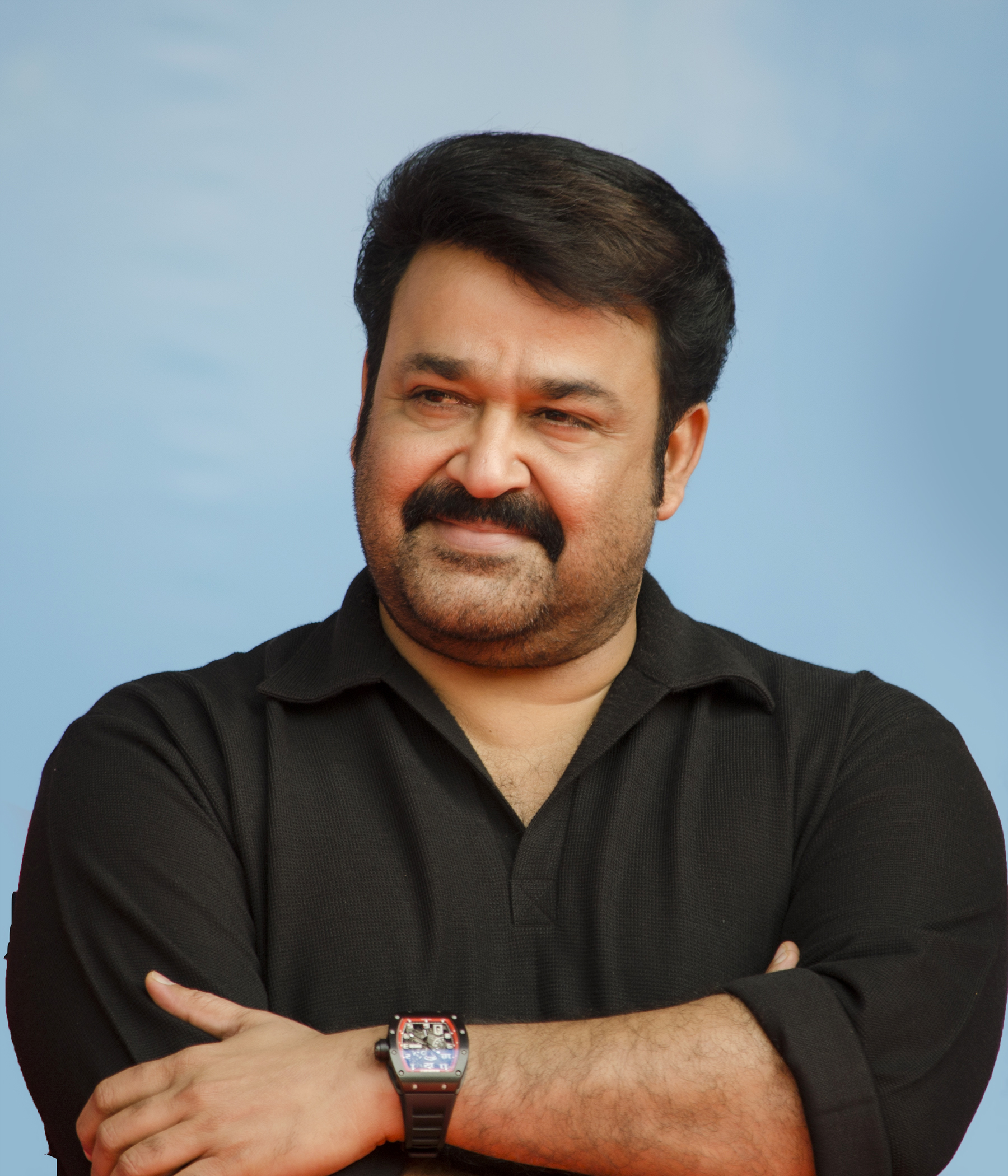
Malaikottai Vaaliban is the first collaboration of Lijo Jose Pellissery and Mohanlal.

On 25 October 2022, John & Mary Creative, the newly launched production house of former minister Shibu Baby John, announced their debut film which brought together director Lijo Jose Pellissery and actor Mohanlal for the first time. The title was announced on 22 December. At that time, media reported that the film is a period drama in which Mohanlal portrays the role of a wrestler. The screenplay was written by P. S. Rafeeque. Pellissery retained most of the technical crew from his previous films. Tinu Pappachan was appointed as the associate director. The film credits Shibu Baby John and Achu Baby John from John & Mary Creative, Kochumon Century from Century Films, Jacob K. Babu from Maxlab Cinemas and Entertainments, and Vikram Mehra and Siddharth Anand Kumar from Yoodlee Films as producers. Additionally, Pellissery's Amen Movie Monastery also joined the production.

Pellissery conceived the initial story during the COVID-19 lockdown and later expanded it into a narrative that blurs time and space. He collaborated with Rafeeque to develop the screenplay. Pellissery chose him for his belief that Rafeeque could contribute to a language and vocabulary "rooted in the soil". The film was originally planned in Tamil. In the scripting process, Pellissery transformed the concept into a broader canvas, particularly in terms of characters and landscape. He drew inspirations from around the world, incorporating elements from Japanese folklore and Samurai culture to Westerns, among other sources.

According to John, Malaikottai Vaaliban is a "complete action cinema". Mohanlal stated that the film is crafted in the style of a Western film, and the storyline is not confined to any specific time period. The narrative unfolds in its own world, transcending space and time, blending philosophical and spiritual elements. The film allows for individual interpretations, with Mohanlal stating, "each viewer's perspective would be as diverse and unique as strokes of a painting". Additionally, he suggested that it could also be perceived as a cinematic zen story. Pelissery added that the film is without any particular genre and can be perceived as a cinematic rendition of an Amar Chitra Katha. According to producer Siddharth Anand Kumar, "it is the kind of epic story we have grown up reading", it may look like a mythological story, "but it is outside of the mythological space".

=== Casting ===
Commenting on Mohanlal's casting, Pellisserry emphasized that, "this is a period film which demanded someone with the gravitas of Mohanlal". Describing the character, Mohanlal said that there is an anonymity surrounding Vaaliban, as he can be anyone and possess any ability. In November 2022, the team entered into discussions with actress Radhika Apte for the lead female role, according to reports. There were also reports of Vidyut Jammwal and Rajpal Yadav being considered for roles in the film. In December, Kannada actor and stand-up comedian Danish Sait confirmed that he would make his Malayalam cinema debut in the film, growing a beard for his role, which contrasts with his typical clean-shaven appearance. Sait's character was designed to emulate the traits of a hyena, a concept developed during discussions between Mohanlal and Pellisery. Sait underwent specific preparations for his role. He was asked to watch hyena videos to capture the character's behaviour and laughter. In the film, he spots a half-shaven head and beard look. Sait himself dubbed his voice in Malayalam, Hindi, Kannada, and Tamil language versions of the film. He was first considered for another Pellissery film, which was postponed, prior to his casting in Malaikottai Vaaliban.

Marathi actress Sonalee Kulkarni also made her Malayalam debut with the film, describing it as a "musical period drama". She plays Rangapattinam Rangarani, an actress and dancer. Pellissery discovered Kulkarni from a Marathi film, Natarang (2010), where she played a lavani dancer, which she performs in Malaikottai Vaaliban as well. Describing her character, Kulkarni said that Rangarani has "a touch of Maharashtra" but comes from somewhere else; her outfit and looks are a fusion of many Indian cultures, "there is far too much diversity in this film because every character, not just Rangarani, is from distinct lands". In January 2023, reports suggested that the team was in talks with Tamil actors Kamal Haasan and Jiiva for two brief roles. It was later reported that Haasan declined the role as he wanted to focus on his work in Indian 2. Kannada actor Rishab Shetty dismissed reports about his casting, clarifying that although he was approached for a role, he turned down the role in favor of a Kannada film. In the turn of events, Mohanlal himself was cast in a second role that unfolds during the film's climax, originally considered for either Haasan or Shetty.

Malayali dancer Manoj Moses secured an important role, as did Bengali actress Katha Nandi, who described her part as a "strong female character". Moses was cast because Pellissery wanted someone who knows acrobatics, having noticed him in his unreleased debut film, Moonwalk. Hariprashanth Varma's character look came out as location pictures in February 2023. Sanjana Chandran, a dancer and trans woman, secured a role in the cast and made her acting debut. Television actress Suchitra Nair was cast by Pellissery after he spotted her on the Malayalam reality TV show Bigg Boss (season 4), marking her film debut. Hareesh Peradi, Manikandan R. Achari, and Rajeev Pillai was also cast in undisclosed roles. Bharatanatyam dancer Shanta Dhananjayan plays a kalaripayattu gurukkal in the film. Deepali Vashistha, a belly dancer was also cast in the film. Russian yoga teacher, dancer, and model Diana Nasonova played another role.

=== Filming ===
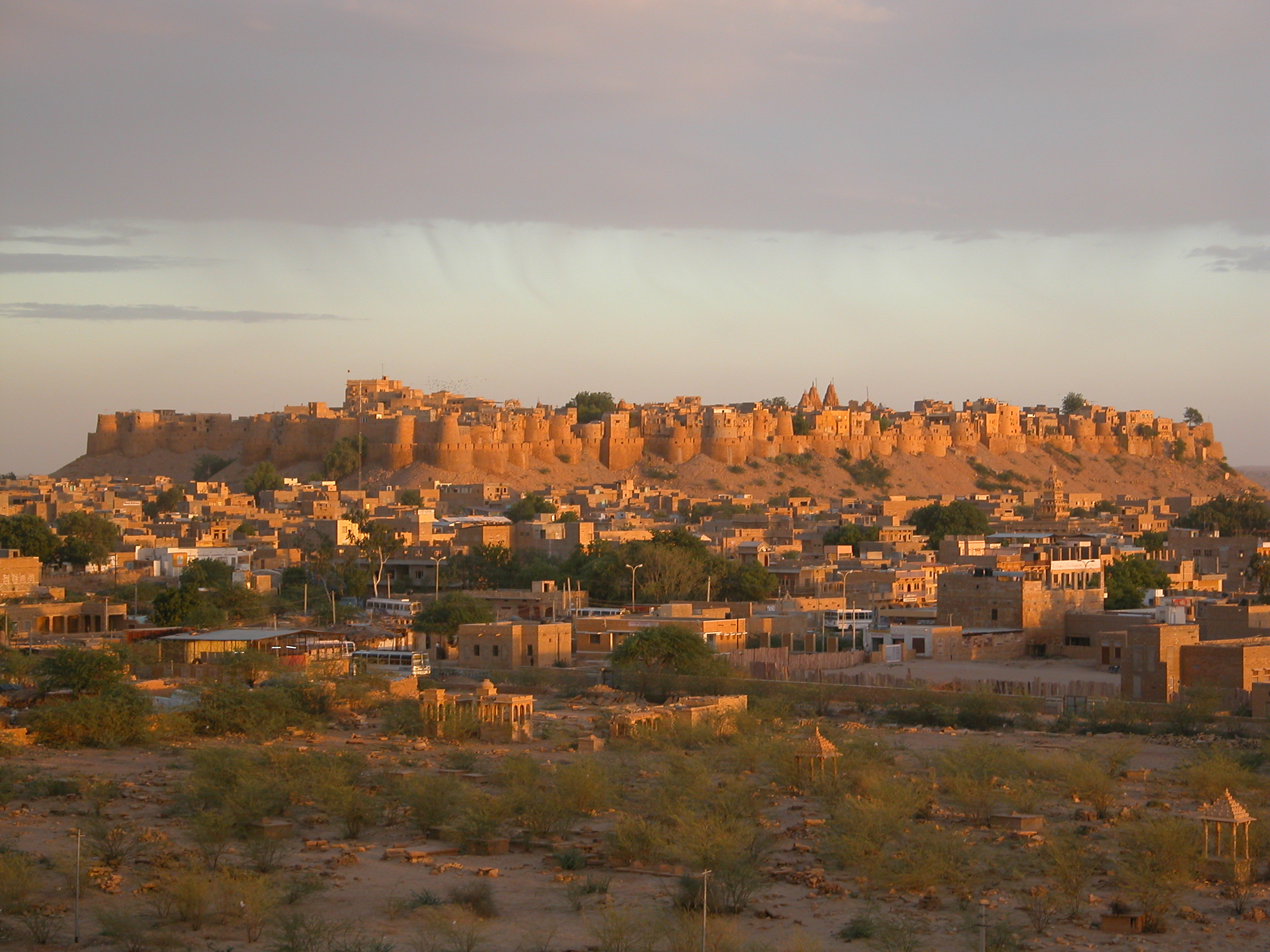
Jaisalmer was a major location.

Principal photography for the film began with a customary pooja function on 18 January 2023 in Jaisalmer, Rajasthan. Madhu Neelakandan was the cinematographer. The majority of the film was shot in Rajasthan. The production was relocated to Pokhran, Rajasthan on 24 February for further shooting. After a span of 77 days, the schedule in Rajasthan was completed by the first week of April.

The second schedule was planned at Sree Gokulam Film Studios in Chennai. It was charted to last 40 days. The schedule began in early May, utilising sets built for the film. The film used more than 1500 extras on set. In addition to Chennai, filming also took place in Pondicherry. The second schedule lasted 50 days. Filming was wrapped on 13 June 2023. The film in its entirety was completed in approximately 130 days shooting. Stunts were choreographed by Vikram Mor and Supreme Sundar.

== Music ==
The film's background score and songs were composed by Prashant Pillai, a regular collaborator of Pellissery. Screenwriter P. S. Rafeeque also contributed the lyrics for all songs, except "Madabhare Naina" by Preeti Pillai and "Shabnami" by Varun Grover. The initial composition of four songs—"Punnara Kattile Poovanatthil", "Raakk", "Thaayum", and "Ezhimala Kottayile"—were done by Rafeeque.

The soundtrack album, distributed by the record label Saregama, was preceded with three singles: "Punnara Kattile Poovanatthil", "Raakk" and "Madabhara Mizhiyoram". The full album was released on 18 January 2024, which includes Malayalam and Hindi songs.

== Marketing ==
Following the unveiling of the film's first-look poster in April 2023, a limited edition of 25 physical metal posters, autographed by Mohanlal and Pellissery, along with a digital collectible in the form of an NFT, verified through the Polygon blockchain were auctioned. It received bids from over 30 countries. In November 2023, the makers of the film collaborated with a United Kingdom-based company to release a DNFT (Decentralized Non-Fungible Token) of Malaikottai Vaaliban, offering an alternative to the centralised NFT. In December 2023, a book titled The Making of Malaikottai Vaaliban, authored by Toby T. Arnold, was published in both paperback and Kindle editions. The book provides a detailed account of the behind-the-scenes work that went into the production of Malaikottai Vaaliban.

In the second week of January 2024, the makers released a children's comic book titled Vaaliban Comix, featuring the character of Malaikottai Vaaliban as a superhero coming to the rescue of children in distress. On 18 January 2024, the producers collaborated with Jain International School of Creative Arts and Manorama Online to organize a strongman competition called the "Strongman Challenge" at Bolgatty Palace, Kochi. Two distinct competitions were held, one for professional bodybuilders, powerlifters and weightlifters and another for sports enthusiasts in the general category. The winners were bestowed with the title of Mr. Vaaliban along with a cash prize. This event marked the first ever occurrence of a strongman competition in Kerala.

The European distributor RFT Films organized various events in the United Kingdom under the name of Vaaliban Festival, including fan meets and club nights. An audio launch function was held on 19 January in Kochi, attended by the cast and crew. It was telecast on Flowers TV. The film's promotional materials were installed inside airport terminals. The makers partnered with the online food ordering and delivery platform Swiggy to promote the film among their customers in Kerala, Karnataka and Tamil Nadu. It was the first time a Malayalam film was promoted through food delivery apps.

== Release ==
=== Theatrical ===
In June 2023, John mentioned that although they had not finalized a release date, the film can be expected by the end of 2023. In September, it was announced that the film would be released in theatres worldwide on 25 January 2024, coinciding with the Republic Day weekend. Beside Malayalam, the film would be dubbed and released in Hindi, Kannada, Telugu, and Tamil languages. Mohanlal's voice was dubbed by director Anurag Kashyap in the Hindi dubbed version of the film. The dubbed versions are scheduled to be released in theatres on 2 February 2024.

=== Home media ===
The film was premiered on Disney+ Hotstar from 23 February 2024 in Malayalam and dubbed versions of Tamil, Telugu, Hindi and Kannada languages.

== Reception ==
=== Critical reception ===
Malaikottai Vaaliban received mixed reviews from critics.

Sanjith Sridharan of OTTplay gave 4/5 stars and concluded, "Lijo Jose Pellissery's Malaikottai Vaaliban is a movie made keeping in minds fans of cinema – and not that of a superstar. With action and enough entertainment to keep the audience of the commercial cinema hooked, this visually-rich Malayalam period drama is another great addition to Lijo's filmography and presents a memorable character for Mohanlal, who is in top form". Arun Antony of Deccan Herald gave 4/5 stars and wrote "Lijo impresses with a fictional period drama. The film offers a glimpse of what Lijo will bring to the table next but may not cater to Mohanlal fans seeking action and powerful dialogues."

S. Devasankar of Pinkvilla gave 3/5 stars and wrote, "Malaikottai Vaaliban is indeed a bold attempt in the fantasy genre by Lijo Jose Pellissery, a director known to keep experimenting with his films. Despite its flaws, Malaikottai Vaaliban is worth watching in theaters, especially for Madhu Neelakandan's cinematography and Prashant Pillai's music". Gopika Is of The Times of India rated 3/5 stars and wrote "Lijo Jose Pellishery's Malaikottai Vaaliban is a mixed bag of swift and interesting action scenes, epic frames, peppy songs and quite some lag in the first half. While the basic story line, when you take Valiban out of the equation isn't very original or even well defined, there are very interesting elements adding layers to it."

Anandu Suresh of The Indian Express gave 3/5 stars and stated, "Unlike Mohanlal's recent films, where makers often got carried away by either his stardom or his potential as a performer, Lijo Jose Pellissery's multi-genre movie strikes a fine balance between these aspects, while striving not to compromise on its overall quality". K. Janaki of India Today gave 2.5/5 stars and wrote, "'Malaikottai Vaaliban' could have been a crisp film had the narrative had enough meat in the first half. However, the film sets up a great segue for the second part".

Sajin Shrijith of The New Indian Express gave 2/5 stars and wrote "A tiresome visual extravaganza with few joys. Lijo Jose Pellissery's new film is simply put, a movie with the sensibility of an elaborate play." Nirmal Jovial of The Week gave 1.5/5 stars and wrote "Pellissery decided to create a film that is purposefully made slow. It is unlikely that this film will satisfy either of the [Mohanlal and Pellissery]fans."

Latha Srinivasan of Hindustan Times termed Mohanlal's performance as the backbone of this fantasy entertainer and wrote "Called a fantasy entertainer, there are elements that work in Malaikottai Vaaliban and elements that clearly don't. Expect the unexpected". Arjun Menon of Film Companion wrote "Lijo Jose Pellissery breaks down an epic hero's journey that's not afraid to breathe and take its own daring formal liberties. And this makes it a theatre experience unlike anything you would get to see on the big screen this year". Sowmya Rajendran of The News Minute stated that the film is like a "comic book style adventure film" and told that the film is "visually rich but underwhelming".

Princy Alexander of Onmanorama wrote "There are times when Lijo tries to tell the story through the frames alone, which affects the storytelling. But rest assured, there are some twists that make the film worth the experience and eager for a second part." S. R. Praveen of The Hindu wrote "Filmmaker Lijo Jose Pellissery tries something new with the Mohanlal-starrer, and the cinephile in him is on ample display with nods to yesteryear classics, but what we are finally left with is an underwhelmed feeling". Analysing the movie for Onmanorama, Sajesh Mohan wrote about how Lijo used colours to narrate different stages of his folklore, "Lijo's colour-coding in 'Malaikottai Vaaliban' adds an intriguing dimension. When Vaaliban's combat is primarily physical, colours are gradually introduced until they culminate in red and black. However, when Vaaliban faces a group of treacherous adversaries driven by jealousy, the dominant colour becomes yellow."

=== Box office ===
Malaikottai Vaaliban debuted by collecting ₹5.85 crore in Kerala and with additional earnings from overseas and GCC, the film amassed a total gross collection of ₹12.27 crore on its opening day, securing its place as the fourth highest opening grosser among Mohanlal's films. As of 30 January 2024, the film grossed ₹21.75 crore. By 8 February 2024, the film grossed ₹28.40 crore. and by 13 February 2024, the film's estimated gross was ₹30 crore.

== Cancelled sequel ==
In the third week of January 2024, it was reported that Malaikottai Vaaliban is designed as a two-part film and would be followed by a second film. When asked, Pellissery commented that, "we hope we can give you more surprises once the film releases". A sequel titled Malaikottai Vaaliban II was announced in the end credits of the film. But on 15 January 2025, the producer of the film Shibu Baby John confirmed that the film will not have a sequel due to the film's failure.
