= Ambuttu Imbuttu Embuttu =

- Directed by: Ashok Kashyap
- Written by: Na.Anbharasu
- Screenplay by: Ashok Kashyap
- Story by: N. S. Shankar
- Produced by: KRP
- Starring: Ashok Kashyap; Ashwini; Mohana; Tejaswini Prakash; Crane Manohar
- Narrated by: M. S. Bhaskar
- Cinematography: R. Sivakumar
- Music by: Dhina
- Production company: KPM Production
- Release date: November 1, 2005
- Running time: 145 minutes
- Country: India
- Language: Tamil

Ambuttu Imbuttu Embuttu (transl. All of those and these are mine) is a 2005 Indian Tamil-language comedy film directed by Ashok Kashyap. The film stars himself, Ashwini, Mohana, Tejaswini Prakash and Crane Manohar. It was released on 1 November 2005. The film was a remake of the Kannada film Ulta Palta (1997), which itself is a remake of Bengali film Bhranti Bilas (1963).

== Plot ==
In Palakkad, Thirupathi (Ashok Kashyap) completed his studies and graduated in MBA. Thirupathi lives a wealthy lifestyle with his loyal servant Pazhani (Crane Manohar), his aunt Vijaya (Vinaya Prasad) and his two cousins: Vaani (Ashwini) and Abhirami (Tejaswini Prakash). Vijaya wants Thirupathi to take charge of their export company. So Thirupathi becomes the new managing director of the company. His cousin Vaani and his employee Mohana (Mohana) are in love with him. While in Coimbatore, Thirupathi and Pazhani (look-alikes with the same names) are petty thieves. The pair stumbles upon a bag containing a few lakhs of rupees and escapes to Palakkad. The complications that arise due to the mistaken identities, and the havoc it creates in the life of the foursome, forms the rest of the story.

== Cast ==
- Ashok Kashyap as Thirupathi and Thirupathi
- Ashwini as Vaani
- Mohana as Mohana
- Tejaswini Prakash as Abhirami
- Crane Manohar as Pazhani and Pazhani
- Vinaya Prasad as Vijaya
- Sudheesh as Hariharan
- Madhan Bob as Krishnamoorthy
- Sathyapriya as Savithri
- Adade Manohar as Inspector Chandrakanth
- Rajkrishna as Shop owner

== Production ==
Ashok Kashyap, a cinematographer and a producer in Kannada cinema, planned to remake the Kannada film Ulta Palta (1997) in Tamil language. Apart from directing and producing the film, Ashok Kashyap also played the lead role. Comedian Crane Manohar, who after doing small comedy roles, got his first major lead role. Ashwini, Vinaya Prasad, and Malayalam film actor Sudheesh were also added to the cast.

== Soundtrack ==
Ambuttu Imbuttu Embuttu

Soundtrack album by Dhina
- Released: 2005
- Recorded: 2005
- Genre: Feature film soundtrack
- Length: 22:53
- Label: Lahari Music
- Producer: Dhina

The film score and the soundtrack were composed by Dhina. The soundtrack, released in 2005, features 5 tracks.

Tracklist
No.	Title	Lyrics	Singer(s)	Length
1.	"Chella Thiruda"	Pa. Vijay	Sri Vardhini, P. Unnikrishnan	4:19
2.	"Vaarai Nee Vaarai"	Yugabharathi	T. L. Maharajan, Mahathi	5:00
3.	"Adiyea Ammu"	Ilayakamban	Shankar Mahadevan, Mahathi	4:18
4.	"Love Panna Ellorum"	Pa. Vijay	Dev Prakash, Baby	4:32
5.	"Anjukkum Patthukkum"	Kabilan	Karthik	4:44
Total length:				22:53

== Reception ==
Malini Mannath of Chennai Online said, "one would never have thought that a plot with such potential for humor would turn out to be such a tragic experience for the viewers. And the best part of the film? The acknowledgment that it is an adaptation of Shakespeare's Comedy of Errors. Though one wouldn't like to know what the bard would have thought of this one".

== See also ==
- The Comedy of Errors § Adaptations
