= Pallavi Krishnan =

Indian classical dancer

Pallavi Krishnan (21 September 1968) is a leading exponent of the dance form, Mohiniyattam. She received the Sangeet Natak Akademi award for 2022 in Mohiniyattam from president Murmu.

== Early life and education ==
Krishnan was born in Durgapur, West Bengal, but after her post-graduate studies in Kerala, she settled in Thrissur. She did her B.Sc. in Bioscience from Burdwan University of West Bengal. But she had no interest in academics and wanted to study dance. So she did a second under-graduate degree, B.Music from Shantiniketan in Kathakali, Manipuri and Rabindra Sangeeth, Viswa Bharathi University. She was spotted by guru Kalamandalam Shankaranarayanan, who felt that her abhinaya suits Mohiniyattam and initiated her into Mohiniyattam dance form. In 1992, she moved to Thrissur and did her post-graduation at Kerala Kalamandiram under Bharati Shivaji and Kalamandalam Sugandhi.

== Personal life ==
Pallavi Krishnan, originally from Durgapur, West Bengal, has been married to cultural scholar K.K. Gopalakrishnan since 1994. The couple have a daughter, Priyamvada Krishnan, who has pursued a career in acting and classical dancing.

Krishnan is deeply rooted in spiritual practice; she has stated that she prays daily and considers faith an 'important source of strength', particularly during overseas tours, identifying Shiva(one of the principal deities of Hinduism) as the central figure in her spiritual practice.

== Career ==
In 1994, she started Lasya Academy of Mohiniyattam at Thrissur. In 2000, she started doing choreographies in Mohiniyattam. Her Ritu-Raga is a fusion of Bengali and Kerala forms, Rabindra Sangeeth with Kerala's Sopanam music. In February 2009, she conducted a workshop for Bangladeshi dancers at Dhaka. In September 2013, she performed at Kochi in an event organised by the Bank Employee's cultural wing ‘BEAME’ in association with Ernakulam Karayogam.

In 2018, she performed at Bharat Bhavan at Vazhuthacaud, Thiruvananthapuram. In December 2018, she also performed at the Soorya dance and music fete, also at Thiruvananthapuram.

== Awards ==
- In 2008, she received the Kerala Sangeet Natak Akademi award.
- She received Sushree award of the Vichar-March, Kolkata.
- On 6 March 2024, she received the National Sangeet Natak Akademi award for Mohiniyattam 2022 from president Murmu.
