= Sulfiq L. =

Indian playback singer

Sulfiq.L
- Born: Zulfiqre Likhayathulla; Alappuzha, Kerala
- Occupations: Playback singer Director

Sulfiq.L is a playback singer as well as a director. He has sung Tamil and Malayalam language songs for feature films and has also performed and directed many music videos.

Sulfiq was noticed by film industry only after his Dubai based music videos and was introduced as playback singer in the Tamil film Manal Naharam directed by actor Shankar. Album 'Dubai Days', released on UAE National day, sung by Sulfiq was a YouTube success.

The title song 'Aakaasha Kuda' from Oru Mexican Aparatha (2017) has made Sulfiq a noticeable singer of Malayalam films. He has also launched a YouTube channel called Sound Clef for talented singers waiting for opportunities.

== Personal life ==
Sulfiq, born in Alappuzha, Kerala is working as infrastructure & utility manager at Afcons LLC for road transport authority project, Dubai.

== Discography ==
Year	Song	Film / Album	Music
2012	Habeebi	Music Video	Ashraf Manjeri
2012	Marhaban	Music Video	Retheesh Roy
2013	Freedom Era	Music Video	Retheesh Roy
2015	Theeyaga Theeyaga	Manal Naharam	Rinil Gowtham
2015	Njan Oru Minnal Kodi	Sand City (D)	Rinil Gowtham
2015	Theechoodi Theechoodi	Sand City (D)	Rinil Gowtham
2016	Moovanthikkatte	Kanthari	Rinil Gowtham
2016	Onnanam Kunninmel	Onnanam Kunninmel	Shyam Dharman
2016	Dubai Days	Music Video	Rinil Gowtham
2017	Mazhavillu	Music Video	Rinil Gowtham
2017	Aakaasha Kuda	Oru Mexican Aparatha	Manikandan Iyyappan
2017	Diamond for you	Music Video	Nikhil R Nair
2018	Diamond for you-2	Music Video	Retheesh Roy
2019	Kunjade Ninte Manassil...	Ittymaani: Made in China	4 Musics
2022	Love Parenda...	Onnu	Noufal Nazar
