= Varuna Shetty =

Indian actress

- Other name: Varuna Shetty
- Years active: 2012
- Spouse: Prithviraj Hegde

Varuna Shetty is an Indian actress who has done Malayalam- and Tamil-language films.

== Career ==
She has been launched by Ranjith Bajpe in his first directional venture Tulu movie, Nirel. Later she worked under Oru Thalai Ragam Shankar in his UAE based thriller Manal Naharam, a Tamil film. Later she signed Rasam, a Mohanlal film again shot in UAE. Both the movies have been released.

== Personal life ==
Varuna Shetty born in Dubai, and studied at "Our Own Indian High School", Dubai and completed MBA from Manipal University Dubai. She got selected for "Nirel" to play lead role at an audition in Dubai.

== Filmography ==
Year	Film	Role	Language	Ref.
2014	Nirel	Rashmi	Tulu	
2015	Manal Naharam	Nisha	Tamil	
2015	Rasam	Janaki	Malayalam	
