= Yakshiyum Njanum =

2010 Indian film

- Directed by: Vinayan
- Written by: Vinayan
- Produced by: Rubon Gomas
- Starring: Goutham P. Krishna; Meghana Raj; Thilakan; Spadikam George; Ricky; Jubil
- Cinematography: Navas Ismail
- Edited by: Pradeep Emily
- Music by: Sajan Madhav
- Release date: 20 August 2010
- Country: India
- Language: Malayalam

Yakshiyum Njaanum (transl. Yakshi and Me) is a 2010 Indian Malayalam-language horror film written and directed by Vinayan. The film was produced by Rubon Gomez through the company RG Productions India. It stars Goutham P. Krishna, Meghna Raj, Thilakan, and Spadikam George. Its original score and soundtrack were composed by Sajan Madhav.

Yakshiyum Njanum was Vinayan's third horror film after Aakasha Ganga and Vellinakshatram. Yakshiyum Njanum is the first Malayalam film to be shot using a Red One camera.

== Plot ==
Shyam commits a crime and flees to the estate bungalow of Minister Madhavan where he hides. There he befriends Aathira and falls in love with her. The estate bungalow is well known for the presence of ghosts, and it is rumored that people who go there will never leave the bungalow alive. Later, Shyam learns that Aathira is a ghost seeking vengeance against who killed her, her lover Ananthan, and her father in the past and agrees to help her accomplish her mission.

Meanwhile, Madhavan plans to conduct a Pooja to destroy Aathira's ghost. Aathira manages to kill Valmiki with the help of Shyam, but cannot withstand the efforts of Narayanji and is destroyed. Before vanishing, she expresses one last wish to kill Madhavan. Shyam is soon arrested by the police and brought to the bungalow. There he learns about the death of his sister and his mother was imprisoned. Furious, he kills Madhavan, thereby fulfilling the last wish of Aathira. Narayanji says that if the ghost wants, she can resume life in her human form and Madhavan asks for death. The movie ends with Aathira's soul smiling at Shyam, assuring that she will return.

== Cast ==
- Meghana Raj as Aathira
- Gautham Krishn as Shyam
- Thilakan as Narayanji
- Spadikam George as Minister Meledathu Madhavan
- Jubil Rajan P Dev as Renjith
- Ricky as Johnny
- Captain Raju as Sukumaran Siddhan
- Mala Aravindan as Valmiki
- Sariga
- Shobith Rdx

== Production ==
The shooting of the film commenced on 2 December 2009 at Marine Drive, Vaikom, Muhamma, Cherthala, Vypin Beach, uttalam, Ambasamudram, Achankovil, Thenmala, and Palaruvi. All the sound was recorded at Chitranjali Studio Kochi Sound Recordist Mebinsreejith.

The film stirred much controversy because director Vinayan was against FEFKA, the directors' association of Kerala. The shooting of the film was interrupted due to external interference. Actors Jagathi Sreekumar, Guinness Pakru, and Indrans stepped out from the film after pressure from film associations. The film was not allowed to censor at first, but director Vinayan consulted the High Court of Kerala and won the case.

== Soundtrack ==
The soundtrack for the film was scored by débutante Sajan Madhav, with lyrics penned by Kaithapram and Vinayan.

Song	Artist(s)
"Vrindhavanamundo"	Madhu Balakrishnan
"Anuragayamune"	K. S. Chithra
"Thenundo Poove"	Vijay Yesudas, Manjari
"Ponmane"	Sithara Krishnakumar
"Vrindhavanamundo (karaoke)"	Instrumental
"Anuragayamune (karaoke)"	Instrumental
"Thenundo Poove (karaoke)"	Instrumental
"Ponmane (karaoke)"	Instrumental

== Reception ==
Sify wrote that the film is "repeating those same old tricks in a new format! Still, if you are willing to leave your brains back home and set your mind just to have some fun at the theatre, well, Yakshiyum Njanum could turn out to be a watchable fare". Rediff.com stated: "Yakshiyum Njanum is a substandard fare and nothing more". Nowrunning.com wrote "Vinayan has moved miles ahead of Aakasha Ganga, and has tried to bring in a few fresh scares into his new film ... in spite of all this, there is no genuine scariness in it", but added that "Meghna who plays the Yakshi is a charmer".
