= Samshayam =

2025 Indian Malayalam-language film

- Theatrical release poster
- Directed by: Rajesh Ravi
- Written by: Rajesh Ravi; Sanu Majeed
- Produced by: Suraj P.S; Dixon Poduthas; Lino Philip
- Starring: Sharaf U Dheen; Vinay Forrt; Lijomol Jose; Priyamvada Krishnan
- Cinematography: Manesh Madhavan
- Edited by: Lijo Paul
- Music by: Hesham Abdul Wahab
- Production company: 1895 Studios
- Distributed by: 1895 Studios
- Release date: 16 May 2025
- Running time: 120 minutes
- Country: India
- Language: Malayalam

Samshayam (transl. Doubt) is a 2025 Indian Malayalam-language comedy drama film written and directed by Rajesh Ravi featuring Sharaf U Dheen, Vinay Forrt, Lijomol Jose and Priyamvada Krishnan in lead roles.

== Plot ==
Manojan and Vimala are married for three years but they are childless. After consulting with doctors, Vimala finally becomes pregnant and gives birth to a boy. After one and half years and on one day, Vimala expresses her doubt that their kid might have got exchanged as he doesn't resemble either of them. This puts Manoj in grave agony. He lets out to find the truth and leads him into a journey of mental agony.

== Cast ==
- Sharaf U Dheen as Harris Abubacker
- Vinay Forrt as Manojan
- Lijomol Jose as Vimala
- Priyamvada Krishnan as Faiza
- Mani Shornur as Vasanthan
- Siddique as Abubacker
- P. P. Kunhikrishnan as Bhaskaran
- Priya Sreejith as Leela
- Sivadas Kannur as Babu
- Aswin Vijayan as Vimala's brother
- Sibi Thomas as SI Bineesh P.C.
- Master Izan Mohd. as Abhikuttan
- Master Athiran Ravisankar as Allan
- K. P. A. C. Lalitha as Manojan's mother (photo presence)

== Soundtrack ==
The music is composed by Hesham Abdul Wahab.

Samshayam

Soundtrack album by Hesham Abdul Wahab
- Genre: Feature film soundtrack
- Length: 3:28
- Label: T-Series

=== Track listing ===
| No. | Title | Singer(s) | Length |
|---|---|---|---|
| 1. | "Samshayam" | Pranavam Sasi, Anil Johnson, Drishya | 3:28 |
| Total length: | | | 3:28 |

== Release ==
The film was released on 16 May 2025 in theatres. It started streaming on manoramaMAX on 24 July 2025.

== Reception ==
Anjana George of Times of India gave it a rating of 3 out of 5 and stated that "Samshayam isn’t flawless. Some scenes feel slightly stretched, and the resolution could have packed a bigger emotional punch. But it’s a sincere film that uses humour to explore a heart-wrenching “what if.” It asks a powerful question: Is parenthood defined by biology or love? Samshayam is a tender, well-crafted tale that sneaks up on you. Come for the laughs, stay for the feels. A thoughtful dramedy with a quirky heart." Swathi P. Ajith of Onmanorama wrote:"The film is a solid reminder that a simple, well-crafted idea can be more powerful than any amount of spectacle. 'Samshayam' relies entirely on its tight storytelling and the strength of its performance. ... Towards the end, the movie does dip into some cliches, especially around motherhood, and the ending might feel a bit predictable. But honestly, none of that really takes away from the overall experience."
