= Vettai Naai =

2021 Indian film

- Film poster
- Directed by: S. Jai Shankar
- Produced by: Surabi P. Jothi Murugan
- Starring: R. K. Suresh; Ramki; Subiksha
- Cinematography: Munish M. Easwaran
- Edited by: Vijay Krishnan
- Music by: Ganesh Chandrasekaran
- Production companies: Surabi Pictures; Thaai Movie Creations
- Release date: 26 February 2021
- Country: India
- Language: Tamil

Vettai Naai (transl. Hunting Dog) is a 2021 Tamil language action drama film directed by S. Jai Shankar and produced by Surabi P. Jothi Murugan. The film stars R. K. Suresh, Ramki and Subiksha in the lead roles. Produced by Surabi Pictures, it was released on 26 February 2021.

== Plot ==
Sekhar (R. K. Suresh), a small-time rowdy, who seeks redemption post his marriage. How other rowdies and their leader (Ramki) who were waiting to pounce on him, utilises the situation which affects him and his wife (Subiksha) forms the rest of the story.

== Cast ==
- R. K. Suresh as Sekhar
- Ramki as Bose
- Subiksha as Rani
- Gautham as Jomon
- Vijay Karthik
- Namo Narayana
- Rama
- Vijit Saravanan

== Release and reception ==
The film was released across theatres in Tamil Nadu on 26 February 2021. A critic from Times of India wrote "this done-to-death plot, which has some not-so-bad scenes, falters in execution as they appear staged." Critic Malini Mannath noted "Vettai Naai which offers nothing new or appealing to an audience, is a futile attempt to reboot an old theme." Reviewers from Tamil newspapers Dinamalar and Maalai Malar also gave the film mixed reviews.
