= Raghuvinte Swantham Raziya =

- Film poster
- Directed by: Vinayan
- Written by: Vinayan; Adv. Manilal
- Produced by: Vinayan; R. Harikumar
- Starring: Meghana Raj; Murali Krishnan; Gautham Krishn; Lakshmi Menon; Thilakan; Spadikam George; Charuhasan
- Cinematography: Navas
- Edited by: Nishadh Yusuf
- Music by: Sajan Madhav
- Production company: Akash Films
- Distributed by: Akash Release
- Release date: 20 May 2011
- Country: India
- Language: Malayalam

Raghuvinte Swantham Raziya (transl. Raghu's own Raziya) is a 2011 Indian Malayalam-language romantic drama film co-produced, co-written, and directed by Vinayan, starring Meghana Raj, Murali Krishnan, Gautham Krishn, Lakshmi Menon, Thilakan, Spadikam George, and Charuhasan. The film tells a Hindu-Muslim love story.

== Plot ==
The film shows how terrorist outfits use money to lure unemployed youth to do their bidding. A mentally challenged young woman wanders the city streets creating a lot of commotion. Many people, including policemen, take advantage of her. A report on her miserable plight is aired on television. Following this, Aboobacker (Sphadikam George), a rich businessman, seeks out the young woman and gets her admitted to a hospital. Aboobacker is certain that the young woman is Raziya (Meghna).

As Raziya's past unfolds, we learn that she was in love with Raghu (Murali Krishnan), her neighbour, and also, that his family depended on her father for survival.

== Cast ==
- Meghana Raj as Raziya
- Murali Krishnan as Raghu
- Gautham Krishn as Riyaz
- Lakshmi Menon as Priya
- Thilakan as Kuttappan Bhagavathar
- Spadikam George as Aboobacker
- Charuhasan as Bappu Musaliar
