= Rasam (film) =

- Theatrical release poster
- Directed by: Rajeev Nath
- Screenplay by: Nedumudi Venu; Rajeev Nath; Sudip Kumar
- Story by: Sudip Kumar
- Produced by: Group 10
- Starring: Mohanlal; Indrajith Sukumaran; Nedumudi Venu; Varuna Shetty; Satheesh Menon
- Cinematography: Krish Kamal
- Edited by: Babu Ratnam
- Music by: Songs: Job Kurian; Score: Vishwajith
- Production companies: Group Ten Entertainments Pvt. Ltd; Chaya Films
- Distributed by: Maxlab Release
- Release date: 23 January 2015
- Running time: 135 minutes
- Country: India
- Language: Malayalam

Rasam (transl. Taste) is a 2015 Indian Malayalam-language film based on food, tastes, restaurants and catering services. The film was directed and co-written by Rajeev Nath. Nedumudi Venu, Rajeev Nath and Sudip Kumar co-written the screenplay of the story written by Sudip. It stars Mohanlal and Indrajith Sukumaran in lead alongside Nedumudi Venu, Devan and Varuna Shetty in supporting roles.

The principal photography commenced on 8 January 2014 at Doha. Filming underway at the locations in Doha, Dubai, Qatar, Kochi, Ottapalam and Thiruvananthapuram. Rasam released on 23 January 2015 and became a box-office bomb.

== Plot summary ==
The film takes place in Doha where Shekhar Menon, a business tycoon arranges his daughter's wedding to be done in a traditional Kerala style feast. Actor Mohanlal invites Valliyottu Thirumeni to take up the catering for the wedding reception of the star's close friend Shekhar Menon's daughter Janaki. Vasudevan, Balu and team fly to Doha. But circumstances force Balu to take over from his father. As the name suggests, food forms the central character in the film.

== Cast ==
- Mohanlal as Himself (extended cameo appearance)
- Indrajith Sukumaran as Bala Shankar
- Nedumudi Venu as Valliyottu Thirumeni
- Varuna Shetty as Janaki Menon
- Devan as VK Shekhar Menon
- Jagadish as Abdu
- Nandu as Govindan Nair
- Mythili as Shahida
- Ambika Mohan as Bala's mother and Thirumeni's wife
- Rajesh Rajan as Job
- Dileep Shankar as Jacob Tharakan
- Albert Alex as Josemon
- Satheesh Menon as Family Doctor
- Nihal Pillai as Manu
- Bindu K Menon as Menon's wife and Janaki's mother

== Casting ==
Mohanlal was signed in a cameo role as himself. In the film, he appeared as the friend of a leading businessman in Dubai. "Mohanlal has a pivotal role in Rasam as he is the one who mentors Indrajith in his work at the wedding in Dubai", says Rajeev. Indrajith plays Balu, a Namboothiri cook who runs a restaurant in Kerala. Balu is a B. Tech and MBA degree holder. He follows his father, a popular cook who is invited to Doha to do catering service for a marriage ceremony.

Varuna Shetty was cast as the heroine, her debut film in Malayalam. She does the role of Janaki, daughter of a Dubai-based businessman. It is her wedding which centres the main plot in the film. Her father calls renowned chefs from Kerala to make a traditional Sadya for her wedding. Mythili is the other female lead in the film. Nihal Pillai is playing a villain role in the film.

== Filming ==
The principal photography began on 8 January 2014 at Doha. The shooting was held in the restaurant Spice Boat, which is indeed the hotel owned by Indrajith's mother Mallika Sukumaran. The crew returned from Doha only by 13 January. The rest of the shoot progressed in Ottappalam. A Thiruvathirakkali of 300 artists was shot in Dubai. The film was shot in and around the Gulf regions. The shooting in Dubai was wrapped in two weeks and return to shoot in Ottapalam. In May, the film completed its shoot in Doha, Dubai, Kochi, and Thiruvananthapuram.

== Music ==
Rasam

Soundtrack album by Job Kurian
- Released: 2014
- Genre: Film soundtrack
- Length: 11:25
- Language: Malayalam
- Label: Manorama Music
- Producer: Job Kurian

The soundtrack consists of 3 songs composed by Job Kurian and sung by K. S. Chithra, Kavalam Sreekumar and Job Kurian himself. Lyrics are penned by Kavalam Narayana Panicker. Rasam makes the debut of musician turned composer Job Kurian. Previously he had co-composed the background score of a Kannada film. K. S. Chithra had sung a traditional Thiruvathira song and Kavalam Sreekumar sung a fun song on the occasion of a feast. Job Kurian's is a travel track in the drum and base genre with Indian elements.

Track listing
No.	Title	Lyrics	Singer(s)	Length
1.	"Dhanumasa Palazhi"	Kavalam Narayana Panicker	K. S. Chithra	3:55
2.	"Sarasa Sarasaro"	Kavalam Narayana Panicker	Kavalam Sreekumar	3:16
3.	"Mayamo Marimayamo"	Kavalam Narayana Panicker	Job Kurian	4:14
Total length:				11:25
