= Gautham P. Krishna =

Indian actor

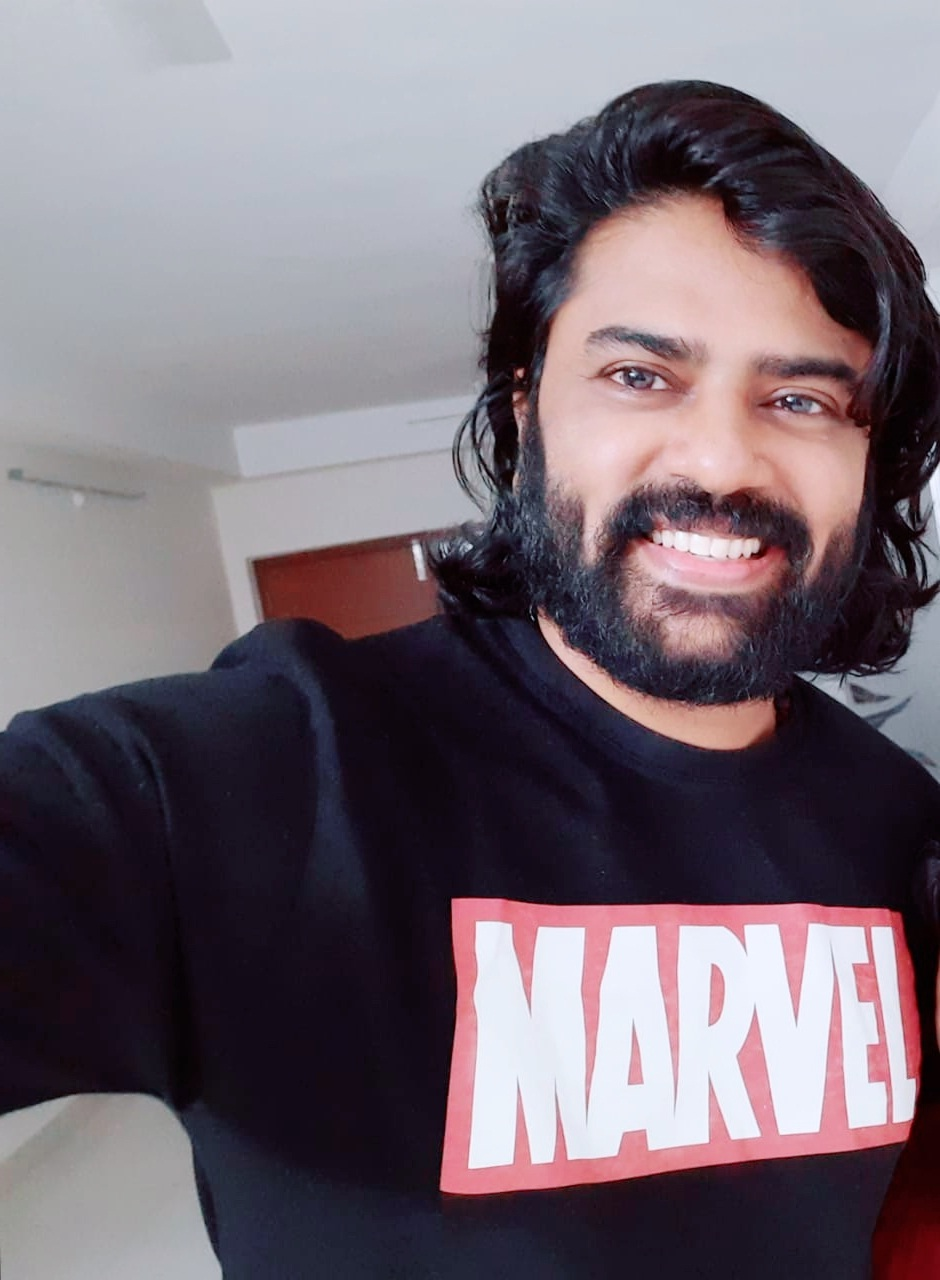
- Born: Changanassery, Kerala, India
- Other name: Gautham
- Occupation: Actor
- Years active: 2010–2021
- Known for: Yakshiyum Njanum; Manal Naharam

Gautham P. Krishna is an Indian actor who has appeared in lead roles of Malayalam as well as Tamil language films. He was introduced by director Vinayan with his 2010 surprise hit Yakshiyum Njanum.

== Film career ==
Gautham was selected to play the lead role along with Meghana Raj by director Vinayan in his ghost flick Yakshiyum Njanum, an Onam release of 2010. The success of the film prompted Vinayan to offer another lead role to Gautham in Raghuvinte Swantham Rasiya, a 2011 release. Gautham also played important role in Again Kasargod Khader Bhai, the sequel of Kasarkode Khaderbai directed by Thulasidas.

After a small break, Gautham made his Tamil language debut with Manal Naharam directed by Oru Thalai Ragam Shankar, which was released in 2015.

In 2016, Gautham had a Malayalam release Poyi Maranju Parayaathe co-starring Vimala Raman and late Kalabhavan Mani. The film was earlier known as Amazon Turning Point. Vettai Naai is Gautham's new release.

== Filmography ==
Year	Film	Role	Language	Ref.
2010	Yakshiyum Njanum	Shyam	Malayalam	
2010	Again Kasargod Khader Bhai	CI Faizal Mohammed	Malayalam	
2011	Raghuvinte Swantham Raziya	Riyaz	Malayalam	
2015	Manal Naharam	Anand	Tamil	
2016	Poyi Maranju Parayaathe		Malayalam	
2021	Vettai Naai	Jomon	Tamil	
2021	Catman		Malayalam	
2025	Randam Yamam	Yathi	Malayalam	
2025	Padai Thalaivan		Tamil	
