= Nayakan (2010 film) =

- Theatrical release poster
- Directed by: Lijo Jose Pellissery
- Written by: P. S. Rafeeque
- Produced by: Anoop Johnson Karedan; Sonu Singh (Executive producer)
- Starring: Indrajith Sukumaran
- Narrated by: Indrajith Sukumaran
- Cinematography: Manoj Paramahamsa
- Edited by: Manoj
- Music by: Prashant Pillai
- Production companies: Illuminato; Kaithakkatu Visual Media
- Release date: 19 March 2010
- Running time: 135 minutes
- Country: India
- Language: Malayalam

Nayakan (transl. Hero) is a 2010 Indian Malayalam-language gangster drama directed by Lijo Jose Pellissery and written by P. S. Rafeeque. It stars Indrajith Sukumaran, Thilakan and Siddique. The film revolves around a Kathakali artist, Vardanunni, who joins the underworld to take revenge on those who killed his family and destroyed his life.

== Plot ==
Vardanunni is the son of famous Kathakali artist Ramankutty Ashan (master). Ashan's dream was to see his son as a famous Kathakali artist as well. But Varadanunni, having seen that his dad could not earn anything from his art, decides to move to Bangalore after he gets a job. His father insists that Varadan should come with them to Mumbai for a Kathakali performance but Varadan defies his father and goes to Bangalore to take up his new job.

In Mumbai, Ramankutty and his daughter happen to witness the murder of a popular politician at the hands of a famous magician turned underworld don Shankar Das (alias JS). The wicked JS kills Ramankutty and his daughter to eliminate all proof of the murder. But Ramankutty had called Nambeesan (his close confidante) on his mobile shortly before his death and informed him that JS had murdered the politician. When Varadan comes back from Bangalore, he gets to know from Nambeesan that his family has been murdered by JS.

Varadan goes to meet Sankar Das and tries to beat him up in anger. But he gets arrested and gets beaten up badly. He is rescued by Karanavar, another underworld kingpin. Karanavar's son was killed by Shankar Das and so he also has a score to settle with JS.

Together they decide to take revenge against JS and with clever tactics - by sowing the seeds of mistrust between his business associates Thomas Brothers and Douglas - as part of the plan, Thomas Brothers are killed and Douglas is left with the option of making a truce with Karanavar. Advocate Sreenivasan, J.S's legal attorney betrays him and has J.S brought to a deserted Island - following the instructions of Karanavar and Varadan, utilising Douglas as a bait. Karanavar fires six bullets at point blank range piercing J.S's forehead - while the latter is tied to an old anchor. Before being killed, Shankar Das warns Karanavar about an imminent resurrection.

== Cast ==
- Indrajith Sukumaran as Varadanunni, a Kathakali Artist
- Thilakan as Vincent Karanavar/Vincent Vadakkan, a well respected underworld Mafia kingpin
- Siddique in a dual role as:
  - J. Shankar Das (JS), a Malaysian based magician and underworld don
  - J. Ram Das, JS's brother
- Jagathy Sreekumar as Nambeeshan, Varadanunni's mentor
- Dhanya Mary Varghese as Mariya Vadakkan, Karanavar's daughter
- Vijayaraghavan as Williams Thomas
- Lalu Alex as Commissioner Joseph Kuruvilla IPS
- Kalashala Babu as Ramankutty Aashan, Varadan's father
- Chemban Vinod Jose as CI Saravanan
- Sreejith Ravi as James, Karanavar's driver and henchman
- Anil Murali as Francis (Paanchi), Varadan's right-hand man
- Salu K George as Sebatti, Gang Member Of Karanavar
- Shivaj as Abdul Samad, Gang Member Of Karanavar
- Kiranraj as ACP Shyam Mahadevan
- Tosh Christy as Daison Thomas, Williams's brother
- Vijay Menon as Adv. Sreenivasan
- Majeed as Minister Musthafa
- Rajeev Kalamasseri as Party Member
- Ambika Mohan as Vincent Karanavar's wife and Mariya's mother
- Lijo Jose Pellissery as Stevenson, a Malaysia based underworld goon (Extended Cameo Appearance)

== Reception ==
The film mostly received positive reviews from critics. Veeyen of Nowrunning.com rated the film and wrote: "Nayakan is an exceptionally polished film, a strange combine of a creepy drama and a jet-black thriller that gradually build to an almost chimerical climax." The reviewer was all praise for the technical parts of the film. He writes: "The non-intrusive background score and a remarkable musical score by Prashant Pillai that gels adeptly with the murky mood of the film gets under your skin as much as the film does. Manoj Paramahamsa's camera is nothing short of savage, and probes into every nook and corner when it's not lurking around unnoticed." The critic appreciates the direction writing: "'Nayakan' would have ended up as another routine study on the spirit of retribution, had it not had an enterprising director at its helm. Lijo makes an imposing debut with the film that prickles our senses with plenty of smart moments." Paresh C Palicha of Rediff.com wrote: "There are films that pleasantly surprise you in times when originality goes for a toss. One such film is Nayakan, a Malayalam film that not only grabs your attention by its originality of premise or treatment, but by its sincerity as well." A critic from Sify.com commented: "There have been not many films in Malayalam during recent times that make such an impact in the viewer's mind as debutant director Lijo Jose Pellissery's Nayakan." Oneindia.in's reviewer said: "Nayakan is an extra ordinary one with a new impact on the audience."
