= Pottan Theyyam =

Ritualistic dance of northern Kerala

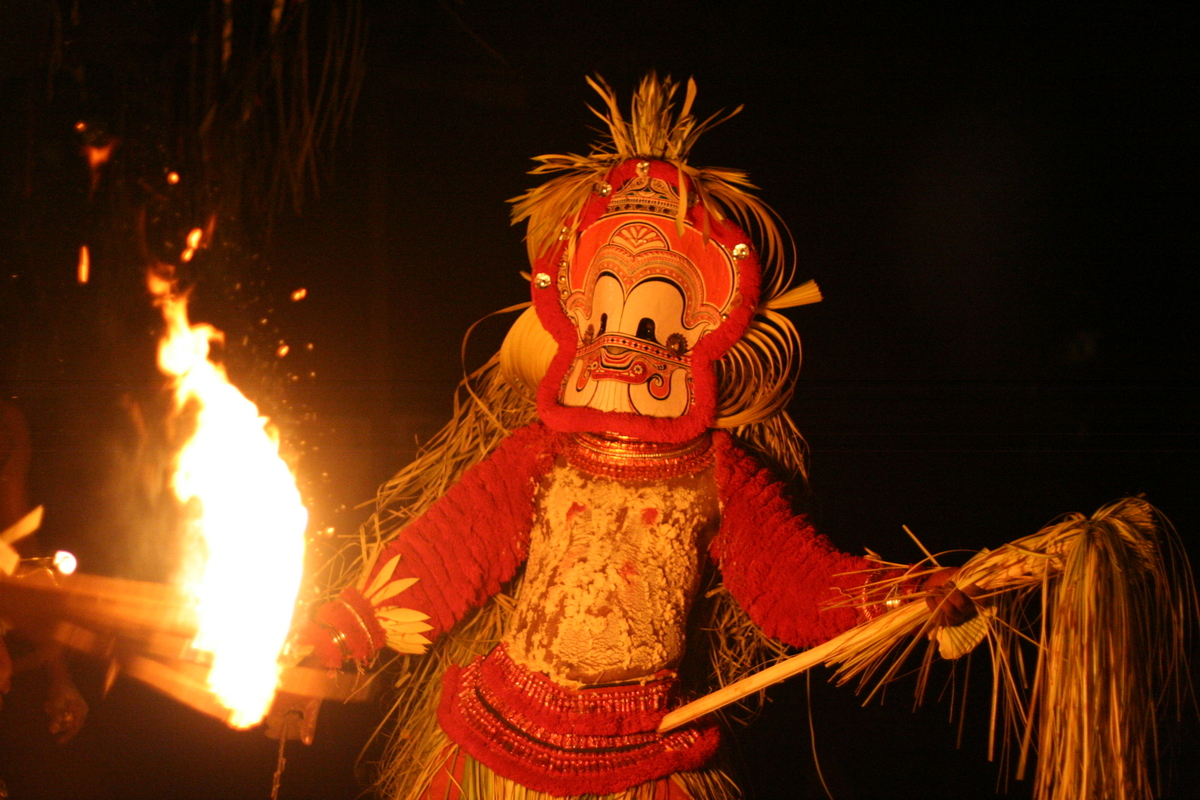
Pottan Theyyam

Pottan Theyyam is a vivid, lively and colorful ritualistic dance which comes in the traditional art form of theyyam, and is an essential part of the cultural heritage of Kolathunadu, a territory comprising present day Kannur district and parts of Kozhikode and Kasaragod districts of northern Kerala, India.

In some versions, It is believed pottan theyyam is a manifestation of Shiva. In some Hindu tharavads, pottan theyyam has a small hut like building called a palliyara. Pottan theyyam is a form of resistance, symbolizing goodness that would wipe out the social evils in the community.

This theyyam is an anti-caste God. The theyyam re-enacts in ritualistic expressions the life of those personalities who had laid down their life for a social cause and is interpreted as a social/spiritual satire that is characteristic of the theyyam's personality. Pottan theyyam is also traditionally performed with a large fire, the embers of which pottan theyyam will rest upon (with the people insisting/requesting him to get up). After the performance and customs the locals may approach and speak with pottan theyyam and receive his response and blessing.

== The Narrative ==
The legend of Pottan Theyyam goes like this, Pottan walks on the main road while carrying a child on his waist and a pot of tody on his head until he runs into the brahmin acharya Shankaracharya. The brahmin asked Pottan to get off the main road so that Pottan wouldn't pollute him. Pottan retorts by asking why he should do that? Pottan proceeds to go on a rageful rant against the caste system.

In Theyyam, Pottan says, " You smear the sandal paste, we are bathed in dirt, you wear the chains of gold, we wear the chain of fish. Have you not crossed the river in which I rode a canoe? Have you not offered your god, the banana grown in our farms? Have you not worn the garland made of the basil grown in our yard? And yet you argue over caste. When you're wounded, is it not blood that comes out? When I am wounded, is it not blood that comes out?"

In the narrative, Shankaracharya realizes his mistake and seeks forgiveness. However, it is likely that the event this is based on led to the killing of the dalit character.
