= Outlet =

Outlet may refer to:

- Outlet, a river that runs out of a lake
- Electrical outlet
- Outlet store or outlet mall
- Pelvic outlet
- News outlet, news media

== Other ==
- Outlet (Antigua newspaper)
- "Outlet" (song), by the American rapper Designer
- Outlet, Ontario, a community in Canada
- The Outlet Company, a defunct retail and broadcasting company
