= Shanavas K Bavakutty =

Indian film director (born 1977)

Shanavas K. Bavakutty
- ഷാനവാസ് കെ. ബാവക്കുട്ടി
- Born: 5 July 1977 (age 48); Ponnani, Malappuram, Kerala, India
- Occupation: Film director
- Years active: 2015 – present
- Spouse: Sabira
- Children: 3
- Parents: Bavakutty; Mariyu
- Awards: Kerala State Film Award for Best Debut Director (2016)

Shanavas K Bavakutty (born 5 July 1977) is an Indian film director from Ponnani in Malappuram district. His debut film was Kismath in 2016 and his second film Thottappan released in 2019.

== Career ==
He won the Kerala State Film Award for Best Debut Director in 2016 for Kismath. The film was released on 29 July 2016 by Lal Jose through LJ Films. It was well received.

His second feature film was Thottappan, based on a short story written by Francis Norohna released on 5 July 2019. It depicts the affection between a girl and her godparent.

== Filmography ==
=== Feature films ===
Year	Title	Role	Director
2016	Kismath	Writer	Director
2019	Thottappan		Director
2023	Oru Kattil Oru Muri		Director

=== Short films ===
Year	Title	Notes
2013	Black Board	Won the P. J. Antony Award / Insight Festival Award Palakkad
2014	Eeran	
2014	Kanneru	Won the Best Short Film Award from ViBGYOR Film Festival 2014 and got selected for screening in the International Documentary and Short Film Festival of Kerala in 2014
