= Francis Norona =

Malayalam author

Francis Norona is a Malayalam author. The Sensitive Father is a compilation of his short stories. Norona's writings are characterized by the faint expressions of coastal populations. Norona's writing became a frequent background for the lives of Latin Catholics who were expelled from Malayalam literature. His poetic language is a key contributor to the development of Malayalam letters. His novel The Gospel of the Neglected is the only work written about the life of the coastal people of Alappuzha.

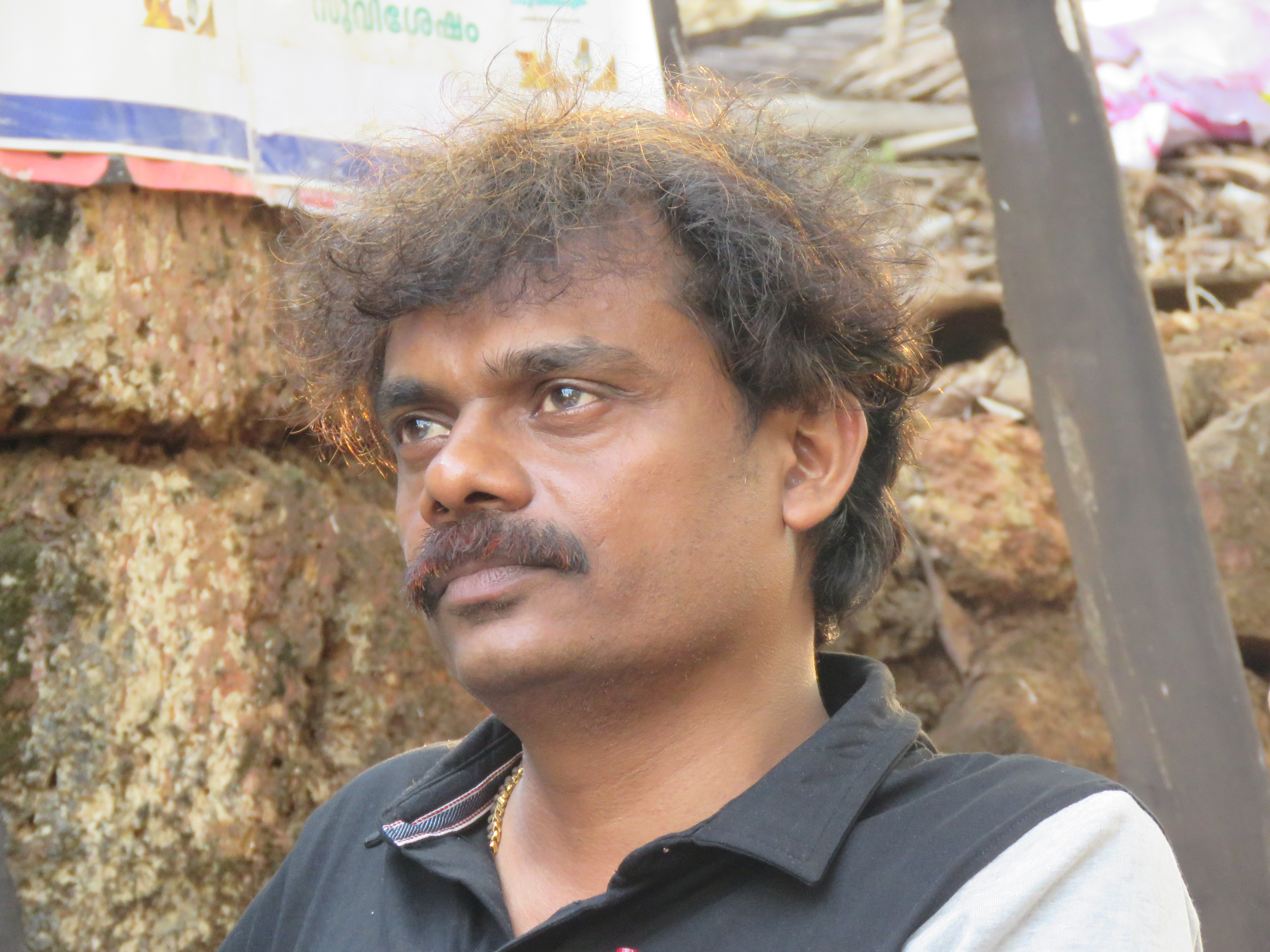
Francis Norona

== Works ==
=== Novels ===
- The Gospel of the Neglected

=== Short stories ===
- Adam's Apple
- Darknight
- Carpets
- Herb
- The Sensitive Father
