= Kanyadaan =

Kanyadana is a Hindu wedding ritual.

Kanyadan may also refer to:

== Film ==
- Kanyadan (film), a 1971 Indian Maithili-language film
- Kanyadaan (1968 film), an Indian Hindi-language social romantic drama film
- Kanyaadaanam a 1976 Indian Malayalam-language film
- Kanyadanam (1998 film), a 1998 Indian Telugu-language film
- Kanyadaan (2002 film), an Indian Assamese-language family drama film

== TV series ==
- Ase He Kanyadan, a 2015 Indian Marathi-language soap opera
- Kanyadaan (2020 TV series), a 2020 Indian Bengali-language soap opera
- Kanyaadaana, a 2021 Indian Kannada-language soap opera
- Kanyadanam (Telugu TV series), a 2021 Indian Telugu-language soap opera
- Kanyadan, a 2021 Indian Marathi-language soap opera
- Kanyadanam (Malayalam TV series), a 2021 Indian Malayalam-language soap opera

== See also ==
- Kanya (disambiguation)
- Daan (disambiguation)
