= Shubh Vivah (2012 TV series) =

- Genre: Drama
- Written by: Rajesh Beri
- Directed by: Ashish Khurana; Himanshu Consul
- Creative director: Bharvi Shah
- Starring: See below
- Theme music composer: Lalit Sen; Rajesh Beri
- Country of origin: India
- Original language: Hindi
- No. of seasons: 1
- No. of episodes: 89

Production
- Producers: Santosh J Nair; Zarina Mehta
- Cinematography: Narendra Joshi
- Editors: S. Salim; Vinay Malu
- Running time: approx. 20 minutes
- Production company: UTV Software Communications

Original release
- Network: Sony Entertainment Television
- Release: 27 February – 29 June 2012

Related
- Metti Oli

Shubh Vivah (transl. Happy Wedding) is a 2012 Indian television drama series telecast on Sony TV. It premiered on 27 February 2012 and went off-air on 29 June 2012.

It is loosely based on the popular Tamil serial, Metti Oli, which aired on Sun TV from 2002 to 2005. Apart from initial arc, there is no similarity between the shows.

== Plot ==
The story begins with Mr. Saxena and his five marriageable daughters who are kind, innocent, and gentle and live in Agra.

A young man from Vrindavan named Amrit manages to impress Mr. Saxena's second daughter, Saroj but in reality he is having an affair with a married woman named Sarla. Saroj and Amrit get married. On the same day Saroj's elder sister, Karuna, marries Mr. Saxena's friend's son, Madan.

After marriage, Saroj learns of Amrit's affair but keeps it to herself. Saroj is desperate to save her marriage but fails. Though his aunt and brother try to make him realise Saroj's importance, Amrit sends her back to her home in Agra. However, after some time, Amrit and his family start missing Saroj and bring her back thus giving a new lease of life to their marriage.

Amrit's mother Kaushalya reveals details of his affair with Sarla to Saroj. She also assaults Saroj and ties her up with ropes. Saroj escapes to find Amrit but walks in on his stabbed dead body. Kaushalya blames Saroj. With help from Vinod and her sisters, Saroj is proved innocent and Sarla's husband is arrested for the murder. Saroj is discovered to be pregnant. While the family plans to get her married to Vinod against both their wishes, Saroj stops the wedding after discovering Vinod and Neelu's relationship. The two are married and the family meet Manthan, Amrit's look-alike, at the wedding.

=== 1 year later ===
Saroj has been married to Manthan and they are raising their son who they have named Amrit. Madan and Karuna, too, have a son named Rohan. Thus, the story ends on a good note.

== Cast ==
- Rakesh Bedi as Brijmohan Saxena
- Shafaq Naaz as Karuna Saxena
- Krutika Gaikwad as Kanchan Saxena
- Neha Narang as Meenakshi Saxena
- Neha Janpandit as Saroj Saxena / Saroj Amrit Nigam
- Eijaz Khan as
  - Amrit Nigam: Kaushalya's elder son; Vinod's elder brother; Saroj's first husband; Sarala's boyfriend (2012) (Dead)
  - Manthan: Amrit's look alike; Saroj's second husband (2012)
- Vinay Rohrra as Vinod Nigam
- Vinny Arora as Neelu Saxena / Neelu Vinod Nigam
- Meenakshi Verma as Kaushalya Nigam
- Priya Ahuja as Shikha Nigam
- Yuvraj Malhotra as Bansi
- Aashka Goradia as Sarala Awasthi: Amrit's girlfriend (2012)
- Asha Negi as Seethalakshmi Bai.
- Abhishek Duhan as Madan
- Sharat Sonu as Chhabban
- Pankaj Berry as Mr. Sodhi
- Vishavpreet Kaur as Mrs. Sodhi
- Amit Dolawat as Amardeep Sodhi
- Arav Chowdhary as Mr. Awasthi
- Khyaati Khandke Keswani as Advocate Konkona Mukherjee
- Rahul Lohani as Gyan
- Niyati Joshi as Chachi (Amrit and Kaushalya's landlady)
- Anup Soni as Anup Soni

== Adaptations ==
Version 1
| Language | Title | Original release | Network(s) | Last aired | Notes |
|---|---|---|---|---|---|
| Tamil | Metti Oli மெட்டி ஒலி | 8 April 2002 | Sun TV | 18 June 2005 | Original |
| Kannada | Mangalya ಮಾಂಗಲ್ಯ | 12 April 2004 | Udaya TV | 2 November 2012 | Remake |
| Malayalam | Minnukettu മിന്നുകെട്ട് | 16 August 2004 | Surya TV | 2 January 2009 | Remake |
| Hindi | Shubh Vivah शुभ विवाह | 27 February 2012 | SET | 29 June 2012 | Remake |
| Telugu | Akshintalu అక్షింతలు | 14 April 2014 | Gemini TV | 15 August 2014 | Remake |

Version 2
| Language | Title | Original release | Network(s) | Last aired | Notes |
|---|---|---|---|---|---|
| Bengali | Kanyadaan কন্যাদান | 7 December 2020 | Sun Bangla | 5 February 2023 | Original |
| Malayalam | Kanyadanam കന്യാദാനം | 23 August 2021 | Surya TV | Ongoing | Remake |
| Telugu | Kanyadanam కన్యాదానం | 20 September 2021 | Gemini TV | 21 January 2023 | Remake |
| Marathi | Kanyadan कन्यादान | 17 October 2021 | Sun Marathi | 4 May 2024 | Remake |
| Kannada | Kanyaadaana ಕನ್ಯಾದಾನ | 15 November 2021 | Udaya TV | 18 May 2024 | Remake |
