= Kanyadan =

2021 Indian Marathi language TV series

- Genre: Drama
- Directed by: Vaibhav Chinchalkar
- Starring: See below
- Country of origin: India
- Original language: Marathi
- No. of episodes: 834

Production
- Producer: Vidyadhar Pathare
- Production locations: Mumbai, Maharashtra
- Camera setup: Multi-camera
- Running time: 22 minutes
- Production company: Iris Productions

Original release
- Network: Sun Marathi
- Release: 17 October 2021 – 4 May 2024

Related
- Kanyadaan

Kanyadan is an Indian Marathi language drama series starring Anisha Sabnis, Avinash Narkar and Sangram Salvi in lead roles. It premiered on Sun Marathi from 17 October 2021. It is an official remake of Sun Bangla TV series Kanyadaan.

== Synopsis ==
After his wife's demise, Ashok is a doting father to his five daughters. As a man of strong values, he's an anchor and guiding light of love even after their marriage. The series follows Ashok and his daughters through the ups and downs of life.

== Cast ==
=== Main ===
- Avinash Narkar as Ashok
- Anisha Sabnis as Ovi
- Amruta Bane as Vrunda
- Pradnya Chavande as Mukta
- Mruga Bodas as Veda
- Smital Haldankar as Aabha

=== Recurring ===
- Sangram Salvi as Sameer
- Chetan Gurav as Aakash
- Shubhankar Ekbote as Rana
- Uma Sardeshmukh as Ashalata
- Manasi Bharekar as Guddi
- Ujjawala Jog as Laali
- Prashant Keni as Abeer
- Aakanksha Gade as Varsha
- Vinesh Ninnurkar as Hrishi
- Amit Khedekar as Ajinkya
- Swapnil Ajgaonkar as Sanket

=== Cameo Appearances ===
- Nirmiti Sawant

== Adaptations ==
Version 1
| Language | Title | Original release | Network(s) | Last aired | Notes |
|---|---|---|---|---|---|
| Tamil | Metti Oli மெட்டி ஒலி | 8 April 2002 | Sun TV | 18 June 2005 | Original |
| Malayalam | Minnukettu മിന്നുകെട്ട് | 16 August 2004 | Surya TV | 2 January 2009 | Remake |
| Hindi | Shubh Vivah शुभ विवाह | 27 February 2012 | SET | 29 June 2012 | Remake |

Version 2
| Language | Title | Original release | Network(s) | Last aired | Notes |
|---|---|---|---|---|---|
| Bengali | Kanyadaan কন্যাদান | 7 December 2020 | Sun Bangla | 5 February 2023 | Original |
| Malayalam | Kanyadanam കന്യാദാനം | 23 August 2021 | Surya TV | Ongoing | Remake |
| Telugu | Kanyadanam కన్యాదానం | 20 September 2021 | Gemini TV | 21 January 2023 | Remake |
| Marathi | Kanyadan कन्यादान | 17 October 2021 | Sun Marathi | 4 May 2024 | Remake |
| Kannada | Kanyaadaana ಕನ್ಯಾದಾನ | 15 November 2021 | Udaya TV | 18 May 2024 | Remake |
