= Aneesh Ravi =

Indian actor

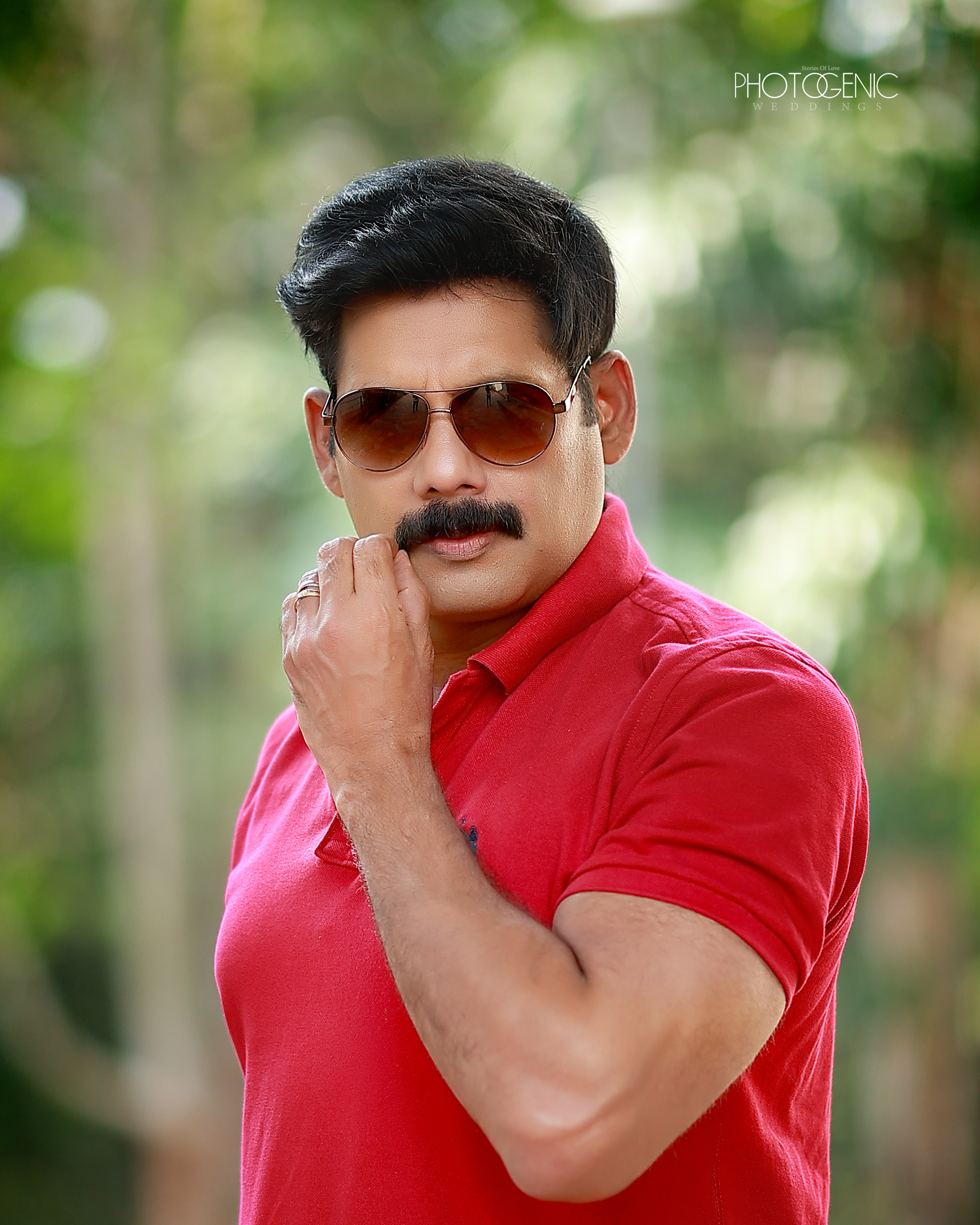
- Born: Chirayinkeezhu, Trivandrum, India
- Other name: aneesh chirayinkeezhu
- Occupations: Actor, anchor
- Years active: 30 years
- Notable work: Karyam Nissaram

Aneesh Ravi is an Indian actor and anchor who appears in Malayalam television. He has also acted in Tamil serials including Megala (2007–2010) and Shanthi Nilayam (2011–2012). He won the Kerala State Television Award for Best Actor for Sree Narayana Guru (2005) and gained popularity through comedy serials Karyam Nissaram (2012–2017), Aliyan VS Aliyan (2018–2019) and Aliyans (2019-present).

== Personal life ==
Ravi was born to Raveendran and Ambika in Chirayinkeezhu, Kerala. He holds a post-graduate degree in Malayalam literature and Politics and diploma in Media cum Journalism. During his school and college days, Ravi performed in amateur plays and did mimicry. He won first prize in mimicry at the Kerala University Youth Festival in 1994. He is married to Jayalakshmi in 2003 and has two sons d.

== Career ==
His popular serials include Snehatheeram, Minnukettu, Meghala, Sthree, Sree Narayana Guru, Oridathoridathu, and Karyam Nissaram. Ravi started his career as a theatre artist in Raghu's Natakayogam, one among the oldest theatre troupes in Thiruvananthapuram. He later worked in professional troupes like Padmasree, Souparnika and Sanghachetana. Some of his popular plays include Ravanaprabhu, Overbridge, and Soothaputhran.

=== Television career ===
Ravi began acting on television with the serial Snehatheeram. He later appeared in soap operas like Mohanam, Sthree, Minnukettu, Alippazham, and Manasariyathe. His popular serials in Tamil include Meghala and thespian K. Balachander's Santhinilayam. Ravi won a State Award in 2005 for the titular role in the serial Sree Narayana Guru. He is also a part of the comedy-drama series Karyam Nissaram.

Apart from interviewing celebrities and being a judge for various reality shows, Aneesh has anchored shows such as Adipoli Swad, Thillana Thillana, City Girls, and Oru Nunakatha. He also hosts shows like Campus Colours, Cucumber City and Erivum Puliyum. Tharolsavam and Sundari Neeyum Sundaran Njanum allowed him to exhibit his skills in miming, skits, and music. Ravi worked as a producer for the 2016 serial Moonu Pennungal under Varadayini creations.

=== Telefilms ===
- 12 Vayassu (as Thulasi's Mother) – won, Adoor Bhasi cultural forum Cinema-Television awards 2016-Best telefilm

== Television ==
=== TV serials ===
Year	Serial	Channel	Role	Notes
1998-2000	Sthree	Asianet		
2000-2001	Amavaasi	Surya TV		
2003-2004	Aalippazham	Surya TV		
2004	Kadamattathu Kathanar	Asianet	Thomakutty	
2005-2009	Minnukettu	Surya TV	Vimal R Menon	
	Sree Narayana Gurudevan		Sree Narayana Guru	Won, Kerala State Television award-Best Actor
2006	Officer	Amrita TV	Pavi	
2007	Sathi Leelavathi	Amrita TV		
2008	Manassariyathe	Surya TV		
2008-2009	Alilathali	Asianet		
2007-2010	Megala	Sun TV	Anbu	
2008-2010	Snehathooval	Asianet		
	Calling bell	Surya TV	Unni	
2009-2012	Chakkarabharani	Surya TV	Advocate.Mohan	
2010-2011	Snehatheeram	Surya TV		
2010	Lipstick	Asianet		
2011	Mohanam	DD Malayalam	Manikandan	
2011-2012	Shanthi Nilayam	Jaya TV	Doctor	Tamil Serial
2012-2017	Karyam Nissaram	Kairali TV	K. Mohanakrishnan a.k.a. Village Officer	
2013-2014	Oridathoridathu	Asianet Plus	Premadasan	
2014-2015	Ente Pennu	Mazhavil Manorama	Mukundan	
2014	Yathra	DD Malayalam		
2017-2019	Aliyan VS Aliyan	Amrita TV	Kanakan (Replaced Manikandan)	Won, Kerala State Television award-Best Actor(Special Jury)
2017	Moonu Pennungal	Surya TV	Ram.V.Menon	Producer and actor
2018	Sakudumbam Shyamala	Flowers TV	Dineshan	
2019-2020	Puttum Kattanum	Kairali TV	Omanakuttan	
2020–Present	Aliyans	Kaumudy TV	Kanakan	Sequel to Aliyan VS Aliyan
2020	Barbarian Sidhantham	DD Malayalam	Thodiyil Sahadevan	Telefilm
2021	Prime Time @ 9 PM	DD Malayalam	Rajappan	Telefilm
2021	Ladies Hostel	Comix Plus	Kottapuram Chandra Choodan	

=== Television shows ===
Program	Role	Notes
Parasparam	Host	
Thillana Thillana	Host	
AAdam Paadam	Host	
Tharolsavam	Contestant	Winner
Tharolsavam	Contestant	
Campus Colors	Host	
Nakshthra deepangal	Contestant	
City Girls	Host	
Oru Nunakadha	Host	
Q 20	Host	
Sunday Splash	Host	
Sundari Neeyum Sundaran Njanum	Contestant	along with Anu Joseph
Adipoli Swad	Host	
Don't do Don't do	Host	with Anu Joseph
Cucuber City	Host	Won, Kerala state television award for Best Anchor
Eruvum puliyum	Host	
onaradham	Host	along with Anu Joseph
Deal Or No Deal	Participant	
Star War	Host	along with Anu Joseph
Onam ponnonam	Host	along with Anu Joseph
Star War 2	Host	along with Anu Joseph
Pookalam Varavayi	Host	along with Anu Joseph
Super Comedy Challenge	Judge	
Comedy Utsavam	Mohanakrishnan (guest appearance)	along with Anu Joseph
Ormakaliloode	Host	
Comedy Stars Season 2	Doctor / Himself	Special appearance in a skit/ guest in episode 1234
Comedy Masters	Devan	Special appearance in a skit
Star Magic	Participant	Ongoing
Onamelam	Host	

== Filmography ==
Year	Film	Notes
2000	Priye Ninakkayi	
2001	Dhosth	
2003	Beacham	
2003	Shingari Bolona	
2010	Kaaryasthan	
2011	Priyappetta Nattukare	
2012	MLA Mani: Patham Classum Gusthiyum	
2018	Kuttanadan Marpappa	
2022	Shefeekkinte Santhosham	
2025	Sree Ayyappan	

== Awards and nominations ==
Year	Award	Category	Work	Result
2005	Kerala State Television Awards	Best Actor	Sreenaryana Guru	Won
2015	Kerala State Television Awards	Best Anchor	Eruvum Puliyum	Won
2015	Adoor Bhasi Cultural Forum TV Film Awards	Best Telefilm		Won
2016	Kalasamkrithi Awards	Most Popular Actor	Karyam Nissaram	Won
2017	Flowers TV Awards	Best Actor	Moonu Pennungal, Karyam Nissaram	Nominated
2019	Kerala State Television Awards	Special Jury Award	Aliyan VS Aliyan	Won
