= Kanyadanam (Telugu TV series) =

- Genre: Drama family
- Based on: Metti Oli
- Written by: Dialogues; Suresh Kakumani; Seeram Mohan kishore
- Screenplay by: Sagar Narayana M Dussa Kiran Sadhu; Seeram Mohan kishore
- Directed by: Bhavan Kammili
- Creative director: Kanyadhara Krupa Chowdary
- Starring: Jessica; Samyuktha; Lahari Raghavendar; Sindhu; Suresh; Bhargav
- Theme music composer: Meenakshi Bhujangh
- Opening theme: "Neeve Neeve" vocals Mohana Bhogaraju
- Country of origin: India
- Original language: Telugu
- No. of seasons: 1
- No. of episodes: 418

Production
- Executive producer: Kadiyala Srinivas
- Producers: Vinod Bala M Palle Premsagar; Kanyadhara Krupa Chowdary
- Cinematography: M Paramdham
- Editor: Rachuri Sivaprasad
- Camera setup: Multi-camera
- Running time: 20-22 minutes
- Production company: Marneni Entertainments

Original release
- Network: Gemini TV
- Release: 20 September 2021 – 21 January 2023

Related
- Mamathala Kovela; Vontari Gulabi

Kanyadanam is an Indian Telugu language soap opera aired on Gemini TV premiered on 20 September 2021 and ended on 21 January 2023. The show stars Jessica, Samyuktha, Lahari Raghavendar, Sindhu, Vaishnavi, Suresh, Bhargav in leading roles. The show is an official remake of Bengali TV series Kanyadaan which itself was inspired from 2002 Tamil TV series Metti Oli.

== Cast ==
- Aditya as Moorthy (Adilakshmi, Bhagyalakshmi, Dhana Lakshmi, Sri Lakshmi and Vidyalakshmi's father)
- Samyuktha as Adi Lakshmi, Moorthy's elder daughter and Venkat's wife
- Spoorthi Gowda (1-154) /Swathi (155-360) / Jessica (360 - 418) as Bhagyalakshmi, Vishnu's wife
- Lahari Raghavendar as Dhana Lakshmi, Ravi's wife
- Sahithi/Sindhu as Sri Lakshmi, Vivek's wife
- Vaishnavi as Vidya Lakshmi, Youngest daughter of Moorthy
- Suresh as Venkat, Adi Lakshmi's husband
- Bhargav as Vishnu, Bhagyalakshmi's husband
- Sree Harsha as Vivek, Sri Lakshmi's husband
- Abhi Yannam/Nagireddy as Ravi, Dhana Lakshmi's husband
- Venkat Kiran as Hari, Vishnu's younger brother
- Yamini/Sai Krupa/Pratyusha as Suma, Vishnu's sister
- Bangalore Padma as Vishnu's mother
- Krishna Priya as Kanthamma (Vishnu, Hari and Suma's grandmother)
- Prem Sagar as Gangadhar
- Leena Kushi
- Rishika /Madhavi as prathima
- Shilpa as Arundhati
- Naveen as Kalyan

== Adaptations ==
Version 1
Language	Title	Original release	Network(s)	Last aired	Notes
Tamil	Metti Oli மெட்டி ஒலி	8 April 2002	Sun TV	18 June 2005	Original
Kannada	Mangalya ಮಾಂಗಲ್ಯ	12 April 2004	Udaya TV	2 November 2012	Remake
Malayalam	Minnukettu മിന്നുകെട്ട്	16 August 2004	Surya TV	2 January 2009	Remake
Hindi	Shubh Vivah शुभ विवाह	27 February 2012	SET	29 June 2012	Remake
Telugu	Akshintalu అక్షింతలు	14 April 2014	Gemini TV	15 August 2014	Remake

Version 2
Language	Title	Original release	Network(s)	Last aired	Notes
Bengali	Kanyadaan কন্যাদান	7 December 2020	Sun Bangla	5 February 2023	Original
Malayalam	Kanyadanam കന്യാദാനം	23 August 2021	Surya TV	Ongoing	Remake
Telugu	Kanyadanam కన్యాదానం	20 September 2021	Gemini TV	21 January 2023	Remake
Marathi	Kanyadan कन्यादान	17 October 2021	Sun Marathi	4 May 2024	Remake
Kannada	Kanyaadaana ಕನ್ಯಾದಾನ	15 November 2021	Udaya TV	18 May 2024	Remake
