= Minnukettu =

2004 Indian Malayalam Soap Opera

- Genre: Soap opera
- Created by: S. Siddiq
- Based on: Metti Oli
- Written by: Pradeep Sivsankar; C. R. Chandran
- Screenplay by: Pradeep Sivsankar
- Story by: M.Thirumurukan
- Directed by: Jnanasheelan
- Creative director: Pooruruttathi Ramaprasad
- Voices of: Siju Kadumeni; Shiju M. X.
- Theme music composer: Mohan Sithara; A.M. Nazeer
- Opening theme: "Ashakosale Pennundo Penninu Minnundo"
- Ending theme: "Ashakosale Pennaane Kandaalazhakundo"
- Composer: Kaithapram Damodaran Namboothiri
- Country of origin: India
- Original language: Malayalam
- No. of seasons: 1
- No. of episodes: 1129

Production
- Executive producer: Saji Vavvaakkavu
- Producer: S. Siddiq
- Production location: Thrissur
- Cinematography: Sudheer Babu
- Animators: Sajeev Karippayil; Feldos Fernandez; Berlin Moolamppilly
- Editor: Sajeev Sadan
- Camera setup: Multi-camera
- Running time: 18-36 minutes
- Production company: Trob Movies Kochi

Original release
- Network: Surya TV
- Release: 16 August 2004 – 2 January 2009

Related
- Kanyadanam (2021 TV series)

Minnukettu is an Indian Malayalam television soap opera directed by Jnanasheelan and which aired on Surya TV from 16 August 2004 to 2 January 2009 This is the first TV series in Malayalam to cross 1000 episodes. It was an official remake of Tamil television series Metti Oli. A spiritual reboot version of the show titled Kanyadanam began airing on Surya TV from 3 August 2021.

== Cast ==
=== Lead ===
- Raghavan as Keshavan Nair
- Meenakshi Sunil as Lakshmi
- Gayathri Priya as Ganga
- Dr. Shaju as Sudhi
- Anand Thrissur as Viswam
- Anu Joseph as Yamuna
- Dhanya Menon as Jyothi
- Dr.Neeraja / Souparnika Subhash as Meera
- Shanthi Williams as Janaki Amma
- Sudheer Sukumaran as Unni
- Arun Ghosh

=== Recurring ===
- Sarath Das
- Dimple Rose as Saritha
- Krishna Prasad
- Beena Antony
- Aneesh Ravi as Vimal R Menon
- Sruthi Nair as Archana
- Harijith
- Kottayam Pradeep
- Rani
- Kripa
- Kalabhavan Haneef
- Sreedevi
- Ramesh Kurumassherry
- Shobha
- Kalabhavan Rahman
- Meena Ganesh
- T.S.Raju
- Kannur Sreelatha
- Sabari Nath
- Anzil Rehman
- Sreekkutty
- M.K.Varrier
- Kulappulli Leela
- Indhu Kalaadharan
- Jolly Eesow
- Seema G. Nair
- Chandrakanth
- Merlin
- Kalabhavan Abi
- Sreerekhaa
- Illikkettu Nambhoothiri
- Santha Devi
- Saritha Balakrishnan
- Joseph Paneagaden
- Ronson Vincent

== Soundtrack ==
The title song of the show was penned by Kaithapram Damodaran Namboothiri and composed by Mohan Sithara. The song was sung by Afsal and Jyotsna Radhakrishnan.

No.	Title	Lyrics	Music	Singers	Length
1.	"Ashakosale Pennundo"	Kaithapram Damodaran Namboothiri	Mohan Sithara; A.M.Nazeer	Afsal; Jyotsna Radhakrishnan; Asha Madhu	3:44
Total length:					3:44

== Adaptations ==
Version 1
Language	Title	Original release	Network(s)	Last aired	Notes
Tamil	Metti Oli மெட்டி ஒலி	8 April 2002	Sun TV	18 June 2005	Original
Kannada	Mangalya ಮಾಂಗಲ್ಯ	12 April 2004	Udaya TV	2 November 2012	Remake
Malayalam	Minnukettu മിന്നുകെട്ട്	16 August 2004	Surya TV	2 January 2009	Remake
Hindi	Shubh Vivah शुभ विवाह	27 February 2012	SET	29 June 2012	Remake
Telugu	Akshintalu అక్షింతలు	14 April 2014	Gemini TV	15 August 2014	Remake

Version 2
Language	Title	Original release	Network(s)	Last aired	Notes
Bengali	Kanyadaan কন্যাদান	7 December 2020	Sun Bangla	5 February 2023	Original
Malayalam	Kanyadanam കന്യാദാനം	23 August 2021	Surya TV	Ongoing	Remake
Telugu	Kanyadanam కన్యాదానం	20 September 2021	Gemini TV	21 January 2023	Remake
Marathi	Kanyadan कन्यादान	17 October 2021	Sun Marathi	4 May 2024	Remake
Kannada	Kanyaadaana ಕನ್ಯಾದಾನ	15 November 2021	Udaya TV	18 May 2024	Remake
