= Anu Joseph =

Indian actress

- Born: Kasargod, India
- Occupation: Actress
- Years active: 2000–present

Anu Joseph is an Indian actress in the Malayalam television industry. She made her acting debut in 2003, through the Malayalam Movie, Paadam Onnu: Oru Vilapam directed by T. V. Chandran. Anu was a participant of Bigg Boss Malayalam season 5.

== Career ==
Anu Joseph won the Kalathilakam title in the school Youth Festival and became the part of Kalabhavan dance troupe to perform classical art forms and started getting offers from serials. Anu made her debut in the serial Chithralekha aired on Surya TV and later went on to do many popular serials including Makalude Amma, Minnukettu, Aalilathaali, Snehachandhrika, Pazhassi Raja and Oridathoridathu. While she plays an innocent and sweet girl in Alilathaali, she portrays a pretentious woman in Oridathoridathu. However, it was through Minnukettu that she got noticed. Her breakthrough role was Advocate Sathyabhama in Karyam Nissaram. In 2023, she entered Big Boss Malayalam as a wild card entrant.

== Television ==
=== TV serials ===
| Year | Serial | Channel | Role | Notes |
|---|---|---|---|---|
| 2004 | Chitralekha | Surya TV | Nun | |
| 2004 | Arikil Oral Koode | DD Malayalam | Maya | Telefilm |
| 2004–2009 | Minnukettu | Surya TV | Yamuna | Lead Role, First serial in Malayalam to cross 1000 episodes |
| 2005 | Culcutta Hospital | Surya TV | Nurse | |
| 2005 | Padan Maranna Vishu Pakshi | Surya TV | Reshmi | Telefilm |
| | Atmeeya Kachavadam | - | | Telefilm |
| 2005 | Thalolam | DD Malayalam | Renuka | |
| 2006–2007 | Nombarappoovu | Asianet | Radhika | Antagonist |
| 2006–2007 | Vikramadithyan | Asianet | | |
| 2006 | Magalude Amma | Surya TV | Priya | |
| 2006 | Makal Marumagal | Surya TV | | |
| 2006 | Snehachandrika | Doordarshan | | |
| 2006 | Yathra | Doordarshan | | |
| 2007 | Velankanni Mathavu | Surya TV | Annie | |
| 2007 | Swami Ayyappan | Asianet | | |
| 2008-2009 | Aalilathaali | Asianet | Sumithra Devi | Lead Role |
| 2008 | Pazhasshi Raja | Surya TV | Neeli | |
| 2008 | Devimahatmyam | Asianet | Rohini | |
| 2008 | Priymanasi | Surya TV | Manasi | Lead Role |
| 2009 | Sree Mahabhagavatham | Asianet | Keerthi Sena | |
| 2009 | Thulabharam | Surya TV | Sumi Sreedharan Kalarikkal | Lead Role |
| 2009 | Manassariyathe | Surya TV | Maya/Stella | Lead Role |
| 2009–2012 | Chakkarabharani | Surya TV | Menaka Teacher | |
| 2010 | Adiparasakthi | Surya TV | Sreedevi | |
| 2010 | Swami Ayyappan Saranam | Asianet | Ammu | |
| 2010 | Swamiye Saranamayyappa | Surya TV | Neelima | |
| 2011 | In Jawahar Colony | Jaihind TV | Maya | |
| 2012 | Alaudinte Albuthavilakku | Asianet | Umaiba Maharani | |
| 2012 | Agniputhri | Asianet | Shari | |
| 2012 | Amma | Asianet | Revathi | |
| 2012 | Ramayanam | Mazhavil Manorama | Sumitra | |
| 2012 | Sreepadmanabham | Amrita TV | Yashoda | |
| 2012 | Ponnum Poovum | Amrita TV | | |
| 2012–2017 | Karyam Nissaram | Kairali TV | Adv.Sathyabhama a.k.a. Bhama | Lead Role, Satire, completed 1104 episodes |
| 2013 | Gandhari | Jaihind TV | | |
| 2014 | Balamani | Mazhavil Manorama | Devaprabha IPS | |
| 2013–2014 | Oridathoridathu | Asianet Plus | Mollykutty | |
| 2016 | Parassini Sree Muthappan | Jaihind TV | Thamburatty | |
| 2017 | Moonu Pennungal | Surya TV | Aparna | |
| 2018 | Sakudumbam Shyamala | Flowers | Shyamala | Lead role |
| 2018 | Aliyan VS Aliyan | Amrita TV | SI Anupama | |
| 2019 | Sabarimala Swami Ayyappan | Asianet | Adi Parashakthi | |
| 2019–2020 | Puttum Kattanum | Kairali TV | Chinthamani | |
| 2020–2021 | Life is Beautiful Season 2 | Asianet | Suhasini | |
| 2022 | Nandanam | Flowers TV | Devi | |
| 2024–present | Sukhamo Devi | Flowers TV | Vasundhara IPS | |
| 2024 | Malikappuram: Apathbandhavan Ayyappan | Asianet | Yakshiamma | |

=== Other shows ===
| Title | Channel | Role | Notes |
|---|---|---|---|
| Tharolsavam | Kairali TV | Contestant | |
| Tharolsavam2 | Kairali TV | Contestant | |
| Sundari Niyum Sundaran Njanum | Asianet | Contestant | Along with Anish Ravi |
| Fast Track | Manorama News | Herself | |
| Pappayum 12 Nakshathrangalum | Asianet | Herself | |
| Don't Do Don't Do | Asianet Plus | Host | Along with Anish Ravi |
| Smart Show | Flowers TV | Herself | |
| Onaradham | Surya TV | Host | Along with Anish Ravi |
| Deal Or No Deal | Surya TV | Participant | Along with Anish Ravi /Shalu Kurian |
| Star War | Surya TV | Host | Along with Anish Ravi |
| Comedy Super Nite 2 | Flowers | Herself | Along with Anish Ravi |
| Onam Ponnonam | Surya TV | Host | along with Anish Ravi |
| Star War Season 2 | Surya TV | Host | Along with Anish Ravi |
| Pookalam Varavayi | Surya TV | Host | along with Anish Ravi |
| Devamrutham | Kaumudy TV | Host | |
| Ennishtam | ACV | Herself | |
| Super Comedy Challenge | DD Malayalam | Host | along with Anish Ravi |
| Comedy Utsavam | Flowers | Sathyabhama (guest appearance) | along with Anish Ravi |
| Badai Bungalow | Asianet | Clara | |
| Keralolsavam | Surya TV | Host | along with Anish Ravi |
| Star Magic | Flowers | Participant | Ongoing |
| She Celebrity Talk Time | She News TV | Herself | Online |
| Oru Adipoli Muthiri Rasam | Red Link Online | Presenter | Online |
| Anu Joseph Official | Youtube | Host | Her channel |
| Parayam Nedam | Amrita TV | Participant | |
| Red Carpet | Amrita TV | Mentor | |
| My G Flowers Oru Kodi | Flowers | Participant | |
| Cook with Comedy | Asianet | Performer | |
| Bigg Boss (Malayalam season 5) | Asianet | Contestant | Wild Card entry, Day 34; Evicted Day 70; Guest for 14th week |

Drama

- Kalathil Dineshan

Albums

- Karuthalanu Karuth
- Girl Friend
- Manikyakkallu
- Vennila Manath
- Kadathu Thonikkaran
- Vaadiyathanelum Poovalle Fathima
- Piriyatha Sneham
- Sree Bhadrakali
- Ithanente Mannu Ithanente Thalam
- Sarwa Mangalle
- Thamarakannan
- Pallival
- Srivishnumayarchana
- Onapookkalam

== Filmography ==
| Year | Film | Role | Notes |
|---|---|---|---|
| 2003 | Paadam Onnu: Oru Vilapam | Wahida | |
| 2004 | Kanninum Kannadikkum | Chembarathy | |
| 2004 | Swarna Medal | Anu | |
| 2005 | Pass Pass | - | |
| 2009 | Aayirathil Oruvan | Usha | |
| 2013 | Lisammayude Veedu | Sherly | |
| 2013 | Pothumappu | Mumthaz | |
| 2014 | Sapthamashree Thaskaraha | Nicey Mathew | |
| 2014 | Kerala Today | —N/a | Dubbed for Iti Acharya; Character : Rekha C Nair |
| 2014 | Vellimoonga | Saliy | |
| 2015 | Pathemari | Nirmala | |
| 2015 | Mythri | Rema | |
| 2016 | 12 Vayassu | Thulasi's mother | Short film |
| 2017 | The Great Father | Child helpline officer | |
| 2017 | Hadiya | - | |
| 2017 | Seethakali | - | |
| 2017 | Sherlock Toms | Deepa Pradeep | |
| 2019 | And the Oscar Goes To... | Sameera | |
| 2019 | Margamkali | Seetha | |
| 2019 | Mohabbathin Kunjabdulla | Latha | |
| 2021 | Changayi | Zeenath | |
| 2022 | Escape | Shiva's mother | |
| 2022 | Mahi | Police Inspector Karthika | |
| 2022 | Vellakkarante Kamuki | Anitha | |
| 2022 | Kakkapponnu | Akhila teacher | |
| 2023 | Adi | Sajeev's sister | |
