= Riyas Narmakala =

Indian actor and mimicry artist

- Born: Nedumangad, Thiruvananthapuram, Kerala, India
- Occupations: Actor, mimicry artist
- Known for: Marimayam, Aliyans
- Awards: Kerala State Television Award for Best Comedian (2017)

Riyas Narmakala is an Indian actor and mimicry artist who works primarily in Malayalam television and film. He is best known for his performances in the Malayalam sitcoms Marimayam and Aliyans. In 2017, he won the Kerala State Television Award for Best Comedian for his performance as Cleetus in Aliyan vs Aliyan.

== Early life and background ==
Riyas Narmakala is from Thiruvananthapuram district in Kerala. He began his performing career through mimicry and later started a troupe named Narmakala.

== Career ==
Riyas worked in television before attaining wider recognition through comedy serials. He later became widely known for playing Manmadhan in the satirical Malayalam sitcom Marimayam. In a 2023 interview with The Times of India, he said that the programme had given him major recognition and described it as central to his acting journey.

He also portrayed Cleetus in the sitcom Aliyan Vs Aliyan. The serial completed 400 episodes in 2018, with Riyas and Aneesh Ravi playing the central brothers-in-law Cleetus and Kanakan respectively. His performance in the programme won him the Kerala State Television Award for Best Comedian for 2017.

Alongside television, Riyas has acted in Malayalam films. He was reported as part of the cast of Rorschach (2022), directed by Nisam Basheer and headlined by Mammootty. He was also listed among the cast of the 2023 Malayalam film Somante Krithavu.

== Filmography ==
Year	Title	Role	Notes
2021	One	Rajagopal	
2021	Keshu Ee Veedinte Nadhan	Driver	
2022	Bhoothakalam		
2022	Rorschach	Soman	
2022	Kooman	Balan Pillai	
2023	Anakk Enthinte Keda		
2023	Somante Krithavu		
2024	Panchayat Jetty	Bank Manager	
2025	Apporva Puthranmar		
2025	PDC Athra Cheriya Degree Alla		
2025	Odum Kuthira Chaadum Kuthira		
2025	Haal	Latif	
2026	Drishyam 3	Mathayi	
2026	Pathira Kurukkan †	TBA	
2026	The Third Murder †	Sojan	

== Television ==
Year(s)	Title	Role	Network	Notes
2000	Jagapoga		Kairali TV	Sitcom
2011–2013	Thatteem Mutteem	Doctor	Mazhavil Manorama	Sitcom
2013–present	Marimayam	Manmadhan	Mazhavil Manorama	Sitcom
2017	Parasparam	Thakkol Vasu	Asianet	Soap opera
2017–2019	Aliyan vs Aliyan	Cleetus	Amrita TV	Sitcom
2019–present	Aliyans	Cleetus	Kaumudy TV	sequel to Aliyan vs Aliyan
2022–2025	Surabhiyum Suhasiniyum	Ambadikannan / Vakkeel Uncle	Flowers TV	Sitcom
2023	Thatteem Mutteem 4	Maheendar Singh	Mazhavil Manorama	Sitcom

== Awards ==
Year	Award	Category	Work	Result
2017	Kerala State Television Award	Best Comedian	Aliyan Vs Aliyan	Won
2024	Kerala State Television Award	Best Comedian	Aliyans	Won
