= Manju Pathrose =

Indian actress

- Born: Kalluvathukkal, kollam district, Kerala, India
- Education: Mahatma Gandhi University
- Occupation: Actress
- Years active: 2012 – present
- Spouse: Sunil Bernard

Manju Pathrose is an Indian supporting actress who appears in Malayalam television and films.

== Career ==
Manju Pathrose's first foray into acting came in 2003 following a chance encounter. While the casting team for A. K. Lohithadas film Chakram caught sight of her photographs from a dance performance, the role ultimately didn't materialize. Undeterred, Manju made her official television debut in the second season of the reality TV show Veruthe Alla Bharya on Mazhavil Manorama. This platform proved instrumental in securing her first television acting role, a character in the popular comedic sitcom Marimayam on the same channel. This marked her breakout performance and established her as a talented actress.

Manju continued to flourish in the sitcom genre, appearing in shows like Mayamohini and Kunnamkulathangaadi. Her portrayal of Thankam in Aliyan vs Aliyan garnered critical acclaim and earned her the prestigious Kerala State Television Awards (Special Jury Award).

In 2020, Manju participated in the highly popular reality show Bigg Boss (Malayalam season 2) on Asianet. Hosted by actor Mohanlal, however, she got evicted from the house on Day 48.

== Personal life ==
She is married to Sunil Bernard, a percussionist, and has a son, Ed Bernard. In 2026, she announced that she had been living separately from her husband.

== Filmography ==
=== Films ===
Year	Title	Role	Notes
2003	Chakram	Deepa	
2013	North 24 Kaatham	Wife	
2014	Tamaar Padaar	Kanakam	
2014	Njangalude Veettile Athidhikal	Rajani	
2014	Odum Raja Adum Rani	Ambal	
2015	Jilebi	Sreeja (Servant)	
2015	Utopiayile Rajavu	Saritha (Maid Servant)	
2015	Urumbukal Urangarilla	Janamma	
2015	Ellam Chettante Ishtam Pole	Nayanakumari	
2015	Compartment	Mallika teacher	
2016	Maheshinte Prathikaaram	Babyachan's sister	
2016	Kammatipaadam	Anitha's aunt	
2016	Marubhoomiyile Aana	Panchayat President	
2016	School Bus	Annie	
2016	Marupadi	Prisoner	
2017	Munthirivallikal Thalirkkumbol	Lillykutty	
2017	Paippin Chuvattile Pranayam	Villager	
2017	Chippy		
2017	Aana Alaralodalaral	Kunji Pokker's Wife	
2017	Thrissivaperoor Kliptham	Prostitute	
2017	Kuttanadan Marpappa	Minimol	
2018	Sarvopari Palakkaran	CPO Nimmi	
2018	Panchavarnathatha	Servant	
2018	Oru Pazhaya Bomb Kadha	Servant	
2018	Kalyanam	Rama	
2018	Kadha Paranja Kadha	Ayishumma	
2018	Laughing Apartment Near Girinagar	Malathi	
2018	Aickarakkonathe Bhishaguaranmaar	Panchayat President	
2018	Ente Mezhuthiri Athazhangal	Gracy Stephen	
2018	Premasoothram	Sarasu	
2019	Kuttymama	Savithri	
2019	Thottappan	Patreesia	
2019	Ulta	Subaida	
2019	My Santa	Smitha Paul/Kunjechi	
2020	Sameer	Prasanna	
2021	Laughing Buddha	Rani	
2022	Bhoothakalam	Asha's neighbour	
2022	Heaven	Stephen's wife	
2022	EMI	Shine's mother	
2022	Raghavettante Pathinarum Rameswarayathrayu		
2023	Christy	Lissie	
2023	Uru	Ayisha	
2023	Queen Elizabeth	Sheeba	
2024	Palayam PC	Chinchu Rani	
2024	Vayasethrayaayi? Muppathiee..!!	Sulu	

=== Television ===
Year	Program	Role	Channel
2012	Veruthe alla Bharya	Herself as contestant	Mazhavil Manorama
2013–2019	Marimayam	Shyamala	Mazhavil Manorama
2013	Manassiloru Mazhavillu	Herself	Kairali TV
2014	Nammal Thammil	Participant	Asianet
2016–2017	Kunnamkulathangaadi	Alice	Media One TV
2016	Mayamohini	Karuthamma	Mazhavil Manorama
2016	Marithatteem Mayammutteem	Shyamala	Mazhavil Manorama
2017–2019	Aliyan vs Aliyan	Thankam	Amrita TV
2017	Onnum Onnum Moonu	Herself	Mazhavil Manorama
2017	Katturumbu	Judge	Flowers TV
2017	Celebrity League	Herself as contestant	Flowers TV
2018	Urvashi Theatres	Herself as contestant	Asianet
2019	Kudumbakodathy	Mollykutty	Kairali TV
2019	Suharayum Suhasiniyum	Suhara	Asianet
2019	Day with a Star	Herself	Kaumudy TV
2019	Kusuruthi Kudumbam	Participant	Mazhavil Manorama
2019	Annies Kitchen	Herself	Amrita TV
2020	Bigg Boss Malayalam 2	Herself as a contestant (Evicted on day 48)	Asianet
2020–Present	Aliyans	Thankam	Kaumudy TV
2020	Salt n' Pepper	Cookery presenter	Kaumudy TV
2020	Meet My Guest	Herself	Rosebowl
2020	Tharapakittu	Herself	Kaumudy TV
2020	Onapooram	Herself	Kaumudy TV
2020	Parayam Nedam	Participant	Amrita TV
2021	Let's Rock N Roll	Participant	Zee Keralam
2021–2022	Pranayavarnangal	Swayamprabha	Zee Keralam
2021	Asianet BB Dhamaka	Contestant	Asianet
2021–Present	Manju's Kitchen	Cookery presenter	Kaumudy TV
2021	Red Carpet	Mentor	Amrita TV
2022–2023	Surabhiyum Suhasiniyum	Kochammini	Flowers TV
2022	Flowers Oru Kodi	Participant	Flowers TV
2024–2025	Etho Janma Kalpanayil	Manorama	Asianet
2024-2025	Surabhiyum Suhasiniyum 2	Kochammini	Flowers TV
2026–present	Ivar Vivahitharayal	Ambika	Asianet

=== Web series ===
Year	Program	Role	Website	Notes
2019	Blackies	Host	YouTube	Vlog - Travel & Food
2021	Boeing Boeing	Philipose's lover	YouTube	
2022	Velivillakunnu Police Station	Soubhagya	YouTube	
2024	Manorathangal	Sumathi	ZEE5	Anthology series Segment: Kazhcha

=== Short films ===
Year	Film	Director
2017	Avalodoppam	Kukku Babu
2018	Meera	
2020	Kanavile Kanmani	Album also Singer
2021	Mudi	Yassir Muhammed
2023	When Divorce Becomes Revenge	Sujith KJ, Vaisakh Balachander
2026	Orikkal Nammal	Midhun S Ajay

== Awards ==
- Kerala State Television Awards 2017: Best Actress (Special Jury) for Aliyan vs Aliyan
- Kerala State Television Awards 2021: Best Actress (Special Jury) for Aliyans
