= Sethu Lakshmi =

Indian actress

- Born: Thiruvananthapuram, Kerala, India
- Occupation: Actress
- Years active: 1990–present
- Spouse: Arjunan
- Children: 4

Sethu Lakshmi is an Indian actress who predominantly works in Malayalam films and television soap operas. She started her career as a theatre artist and later rose into fame with character roles.

== Personal life ==
Sethulakshmi is from Thiruvananthapuram, Kerala, India. Her husband is a theatre actor and make-up artist. She completed her Natana Bhooshan in 1963. She has four children: three daughters and one son. Her daughter Lakshmi is a theatre artist, while son Kishore is a theatre and mimicry artist. Kishore was a member of Boys, a team in Comedy Express, a comedy-based programme on Asianet. They had their own troupe, Chirayinkeezh Anugraha.

== Acting career ==
Sethulakshmi made her acting debut in 2006 with the serial Suryodayam directed by Balachandran Menon aired in Doordarshan. She acted in Sathyan Anthikad's films Rasathanthram, Vinodayathra and Bhagyadevatha. Her other films include Ee Kanni Koodi, Left Right Left, How Old Are You, 36 Vayadhinile, Utopiayile Rajavu. She portrayed the same character in Tamil remake 36 Vayadhinile with Jyothika marking her debut in Tamil.

She won State theatre awards four times in 2 categories. For her acting brilliance in How Old Are You, Sethulakshmi won the best supporting actress for Kerala State Film Award 2014.

Her well known characters in serials are Appachiyamma of Moonumani, Rathnamma of Aliyan VS Aliyan and Mohakadal.

== Television ==
Year	Title	Channel	Notes
2006	Suryodayam	DD Malayalam	Debut
2007	Narmadipudava	DD Malayalam	
2010	Mattoruval	Surya TV	
2011-2012	Kathayile Rajakumari	Mazhavil Manorama	
2012	Paattukalude Paattu	Surya TV	
2013	Karyam Nissaram	Surya TV	
2013	Pattu Saree	Mazhavil Manorama	
2014	Mohakkadal	Surya TV	
2014-2015	Balaganapathy	Asianet	
2015	Aniyathi	Mazhavil Manorama	
2015	Sell Me The Answer	Asisanet	
2015	Bandhuvaru Shathuvaru	Mazhavil Manorama	
2015	Thoovalsparsham	DD Malayalam	
2015	Comedy Super Nite	Flowers TV	
2015	Meet The Editors	Reporter TV	
2015-2017	Moonumani	Flowers TV	
2016	Aluvayum Mathikkariyum	Asianet plus	
2016	Badai Bungalow	Asianet	In various roles
2016 – 2019	Bharya	Asianet	
2016	Onnum Onnum Moonu	Mazhavil Manorama	
2016	Run Baby Run	Asianet Plus	
2016	Varthaprabhatham	Asianet News	
2016	Laughing Villa	Surya TV	In various roles
2017 – 2019	Aliyan vs Aliyan	Amrita TV	
2017	Thatteem Mutteem	Mazhavil Manorama	
2017	Comedy Super Nite 2	Flowers TV	
2017	Ningalkkum Aakaam Kodeeshwaran	Asianet	
2018	Gauri	Surya TV	
2018	Thakarppan Comedy	Mazhavil Manorama	
2018	Annies Kitchen	Amrita TV	
2018	Tharapakittu	Kaumudy TV	
2019	Thankam Pole Amma	Flowers TV	Telefilm
2019–2020	Three Kuttees	Amrita TV	
2019–2026	Mounaragam	Asianet	
2020–present	Aliyans	Kaumudy TV	
2020-2021	Life is Beautiful Season 2	Asianet	
2020-2021	Kasthooriman	Asianet	
2021	Salt n Pepper	Kaumudy TV	
2021–2024	Kaliveedu	Surya TV	
2022–2023	Bhavana	Surya TV	
2022	Red Carpet	Amrita TV	
2022	Flowers Oru Kodi	Flowers	
2023	Patharamattu	Asianet	Mahasangamam episodes with Mounaragam
2024-2025	Surabhiyum Suhasiniyum 2	Flowers TV	
2025–present	Akale	Zee Keralam	
2026–present	Mukhachithram	Mazhavil Manorama	

== Awards and honours ==
Year	Award	Award Category	Awarded Work	Result
	Kerala State Theatre Awards	Best Actress	Bhagyajathakam	Won
	Kerala State Theatre Awards	Best Supporting Actress	Mankolangal	Won
	Kerala State Theatre Awards	Best Supporting Actress	Chinna paappaan	Won
	Kerala State Theatre Awards	Best Actress	Dravidavritham	Won
2015	Kerala State Film Awards	Second Best Actress	How Old Are You	Won
2016	Asianet Film Awards	Best supporting Actress	Pulimurugan	Won
2016	P K Rosy Award		Various films	Won

== Filmography ==
Year	Title	Role	Notes
1990	Ee Kanni Koodi	Akkaamma	Uncredited Debut
2005	Iruvattam Manavaatti	Koroth Madhavi	
2006	Rasathanthram	Chettathi	
2007	Vinodayathra	Saree Selling woman	
2007	Naalu Pennungal		
2008	Innathe Chintha Vishayam	Karthyayani	
2009	Bhagyadevatha	Village lady	
2013	Left Right Left	Jayan's mother	
2013	Black Butterfly		
2013	Kanyaka Talkies	Bus passenger with Ancy	
2013	Nadan	Augusthyamma	
2014	How Old Are You	Madhaviyamma	
2014	Naku Penta Naku Taka	Airport Passenger	
2014	Nagara Varidhi Naduvil Njan	Venu's mother	
2014	RajadhiRaja	Paarukuttiyamma	
2014	Angels	Child's grandmother	
2014	Peruchazhi		
2014	Mummyude Swantham Achoos	Amma	
2014	Ettekal Second	Sandeep's aunt	
2014	Wound	Abortion agent	
2015	36 Vayadhinile	Thulasi	Tamil film
2015	Maanikyam	Kuttiyamma	
2015	Just Married	Stephen's mother	
2015	Ammakkoru Tharattu	Kochamma	
2015	Chirakodinja Kinavukal	Ammoomma	
2015	Acha Dhin	Joyikuttan's Mother	
2015	Utopiayile Rajavu	Januamma	
2015	Rajamma @ Yahoo	Devaki aka Devu	
2015	Thilothama	Kunjamma	
2015	Ashamsakalode Anna	Jeevan's grandmother	
2016	Hello Namasthe	Sobha	
2016	Aakashvani	Aakash's Mother	
2016	Moonam Naal Njayarazhcha	Eliyamma	
2016	Ithu Thaanda Police	Janaki	
2016	Darvinte Parinamam	Annamma	
2016	Pa Va	Ammini	
2016	Annmariya Kalippilannu	Amminiyamma	
2016	Olappeeppi	Neighbour	
2016	Pulimurugan	Bhavani	
2016	Kattappanayile Rithwik Roshan	Neethu's Relative	
2016	10 Kalpanakal	Davis's Mother	
2016	Jalam	Thresiamma	
2016	Koppayile Kodumkattu		
2016	Girls	Meenakshi	
2016	Thiraikku Varadha Katha	Meenakshi	Tamil film
2017	Jomonte Suvisheshangal	Mariyamma	
2017	1971: Beyond Borders	Sahadevan's mother	
2017	Sunday Holiday	Astrologer	
2017	Lechmi	Amma	
2017	Paippin Chuvattile Pranayam	Govutty's grandmother	
2017	Aadu 2	Mariyamma	
2017	Gemini	Lakshmiyamma	
2017	Chakkaramavinkombath		
2017	Oru Malayala Colour Padam		
2018	Queen	Thresiamma	
2018	Mohanlal	Sheela	
2018	Aami	Kuttiyamma	
2018	Padayottam	Lalithakkan	
2018	Dakini	Sarojini	
2018	Sinjar	Ansar's mother	
2018	Aanakkallan	Maid	
2018	Thattumpurath Achuthan	Amminiyamma	
2018	Maari 2	House owner	Tamil film
2019	Oru Nakshathramulla Aakasham	Pappi chechi	
2019	Marconi Mathai	Saramma	
2019	A for Apple		
2019	Sachin	Sarojam	
2019	Ittymaani: Made in China	Mother Superior	
2019	Ulta	Chellamma	
2019	Stand Up	Acchamma	
2020	Uriyadi	Bhavaniyamma	
2020	Mariyam Vannu Vilakkoothi	Mariyamma George	
2021	Mohan Kumar Fans	Kumari	
2021	Ellam Sheriyakum	Reethamma	
2022	Karnan Napoleon Bhagath Singh		
2022	Jack N' Jill	Ammini Amma	
2022	Meri Awas Suno	Padmavathi	
2022	Kochaal	Sreekuttan's grandmother	
2022	Headmaster		
2022	In	Sara	
2022	# Avalkkoppam	Muthassi	
2023	Bullet Diaries		
2023	Laika		
2024	Panchayath Jetty	Chinnammal	
2024	Her	Saraswathi	
2026	Aadu 3	Mariyamma	
