= Shanthi Nilayam (TV series) =

- Genre: Soap opera
- Directed by: K. Balachander
- Starring: Rathi; Kuyili; Saakshi Siva; Rajesh Vaidya
- Country of origin: India
- Original language: Tamil
- No. of seasons: 1
- No. of episodes: 230+

Production
- Producer: K. Balachander
- Camera setup: Multi-camera
- Running time: approx. 20-22 minutes per episode
- Production company: Kavithalayaa Productions

Original release
- Network: Jaya TV
- Release: 17 January 2011 – 9 May 2012

Shanthi Nilayam is a 2011 Indian Tamil-language medical soap opera, which is produced and directed by K. Balachander and starring Rathi, Kuyili, Saakshi Siva, Sairam, Lakshmi Priyaa and Sangitha. It broadcast on Jaya TV from 17 January 2011 to 9 May 2012.

== Synopsis ==
The story revolves around a well known hospital called Shanthi Nilayam and the doctors working in it. The problems surrounding the personal lives of the doctors and the hardships faced by them at the workplace are portrayed very well with different narration.

== Cast ==
=== Main ===
- Rathi
- Kuyili
- Saakshi Siva
- Sairam
- Lakshmi Priyaa

=== Additional cast ===
- Sangitha
- Aneesh Ravi
- Ramachandran
- Rajesh Vaidya
- Shanthi Williams
- Priya
- Yuvasri
- Sangeeta
- Shilpa
- Srividhya
- Rajashekhar
- Sathyapriya
- Aishwarya
- G.V.Rao
- R.Thiagarajan

== Awards ==
Year	Award	Category	Recipient	Result
2017	Tamil Nadu State Television Awards 2011	Best Serial		Won
2017	Tamil Nadu State Television Awards 2011	Best Villain Male	R. Ramachandran	Won
2017	Tamil Nadu State Television Awards 2011	Best Director	K. Balachander	Won
2017	Tamil Nadu State Television Awards 2011	Best Story	K. Balachander	Won
2017	Tamil Nadu State Television Awards 2011	Best Cinematographer	R. Ragunatha Reddy	Won
2017	Tamil Nadu State Television Awards 2011	Best Screenwriter	S. Venkatraman	Won
2017	Tamil Nadu State Television Awards 2011	Best Music Director	Rajhesh Vaidhya	Won

== International broadcasts ==
The Series was released on 17 January 2011 on Jaya TV. The Show was also broadcast internationally on Channel's international distribution.

- It aired in Sri Lanka, Middle East, Asia (Sri Lanka, Singapore, Vietnam, Malaysia, Mauritius), Australia and New Zealand.
- It is also available via the internet protocol television service, Astro in (Singapore and Malaysia)
- In Canada, the drama aired on Tamil Canadians-oriented channel on ATN Jaya TV after its original Tamil Nadu.
