= Metti Oli =

Indian Tamil-language Television Serial

- Genre: Soap opera
- Written by: M. Thirumurugan; C. U. Muthuselvan; Baskar Sakthi
- Directed by: Thirumurugan
- Starring: Delhi Kumar; Thirumurugan; Chetan; Kaveri; Gayathri Shastry; Bose Venkat; Sanjeev; Rindhya
- Theme music composer: Dhina
- Opening theme: "Ammi Ammi Ammi Mithithu"
- Composer: Sanjeev Ratheen
- Country of origin: India
- Original language: Tamil
- No. of episodes: 811

Production
- Producer: S.Siddiq
- Cinematography: Sevilo Raja; Sarath K. Chandran
- Editor: M. Jaya Kumar
- Camera setup: Multi-camera
- Running time: 34–37 minutes
- Production company: Cine Times Entertainment

Original release
- Network: Sun TV (2002-2005) re-telecast Sun TV (2008-2011) re-telecast Moon TV (2018-2021) re-telecast Sun TV (2020-2022) re-telecast Vikatan TV (2024-2026)
- Release: 8 April 2002 – 18 June 2005

Related
- Mettela Savvadi; Shubh Vivah; Mangalya; Minnukettu; Akshintalu

Metti Oli (transl. Sound of the toe ring) was an Indian Tamil-language soap opera that aired on weekdays on Sun TV for 811 episodes. The show starred Delhi Kumar, Kaveri, Gayathri, Vanaja, Uma Maheshwari, Revathi Priya, Chetan, Bose Venkat, Raj Kanth, Thirumurugan, Shanti Williams and Neelima Rani. It was produced by Cine Times Entertainment S.Siddiq, and written and directed by Thirumurugan. The serial was followed by Muhurtham of Cine Times Entertainment. From 2008-2011 this serial was re-telecasted by Sun TV, From 2018-2021 this serial was re-telecasted by Moon TV, From 2020-2022 during COVID-19 Pandemic this serial was re-telecasted again by Sun TV and from 2024-2026 this serial was re-telecasted by the YouTube Channel named Vikatan TV.

== Plot ==
Chidambaram, a widower, who is a respected real estate broker from Azhagarkulam village, he lives with his five daughters—Dhanalakshmi (Dhanam), Saroja (Saro), Leelavathi (Leela), Vijayalakshmi (Viji), and Bhavani. After the death of Chidambaram’s wife, the girls are raised with the support of their maternal uncle, Bose. Chidambaram’s daughters deeply admire him, and he is well-regarded for his integrity within the village.

Initially, Chidambaram plans to marry Saro to Bose. However, when Manickam visits to see Dhanam, things change. Manickam, who was raised by his mother Rajam along with his siblings Selvam and Nirmala, is revealed to have had an affair with a married woman named Sarala. Eventually, the families agree to marry Manickam to Saro and Bose to Dhanam. The two couples marry—Dhanam remains in Azhagarkulam, while Saro moves to Chennai with Manickam.

On their wedding night, Manickam deceitfully visits Sarala. When her husband unexpectedly returns home, Manickam escapes in a hurry, accidentally leaving behind a ring gifted to him by his long-time mentor, Sivasamy. Sarala lies to her husband Ramachandran, claiming she gifted him the ring. Later, Sivasamy sees the ring and suspects something is wrong. He eventually discovers Manickam's affair and, disappointed, removes him from his business—leaving Manickam jobless. Rajam blames Saro’s horoscope for his downfall and begins to mistreat her.

Though Manickam loves Saro, he neither defends her nor allows anyone else to intervene. Only Selvam shows genuine concern for her. With the help of a hired astrologer, Selvam convinces Rajam and Manickam that Rajam’s life is in danger if she continues to live with her son. Believing this, Manickam and Saro move to a compound house, though he continues to visit Rajam often.

Meanwhile, Selvam and Leela fall in love. Manickam frequently clashes with Ramesh, Sivasamy’s son. Seeking revenge, Ramesh pretends to love Nirmala, only to humiliate her later. When Rajam and Manickam confront Sivasamy’s family, they are insulted. This ignites a long-standing feud between the two families.

Viji, the most impulsive and self-centered of the sisters, begins a relationship with Elango, a married man who hides the truth about his marital status. Ignoring Leela’s warnings, Viji falls for him and later marries him—only to discover his deceit. During a Diwali visit, Rajam insults Bose, prompting Dhanam to respond angrily. Rajam leaves the house with her family, abandoning Saro, who stays with her sisters in Azhagarkulam. The sisters eventually learn of Viji’s affair. After confronting Elango’s wife, Viji ends the relationship. Enraged, Elango tries to kill Viji, but she stabs him in self-defense. His wife clears Viji of any wrongdoing.

Viji then moves to Chennai to live with Saro. Selvam and Leela's relationship is discovered by Manickam and Saro, but Rajam disapproves and threatens suicide. Leela’s marriage is arranged with another man, but Rajam sabotages it by revealing Leela’s past. Eventually, Saro arranges Leela’s marriage to Ravi, a seemingly kind businessman. However, Leela later discovers that Ravi is mentally unstable, abusive, and Ravi was previously married to a woman named Sumathi, who had committed suicide by pouring kerosene into herself, and burning herself to death.

Elsewhere, Gopikrishnan (Gopi), a garment factory worker, accidentally swaps bags with Saro and meets Viji while returning it. Mistaking Viji for Nirmala, he falls in love. After clearing the confusion and gaining support from Saro and Chidambaram, Gopi marries Viji. They move into a joint family house. Eventually, Gopi learns about Viji’s past when Elango tries to re-enter her life. Elango is later killed in a police encounter. Gopi consoles Viji and helps her move forward.

Meanwhile, Nirmala marries Santhosh, a man who disapproves of Rajam and Manickam’s behavior. Selvam, disheartened by Rajam’s manipulation, leaves the house and starts working under a man named Balu, eventually earning his trust.

Realizing her mistake, Rajam consults an astrologer, only to discover that she had been misled. She once again blames Saro. In a moment of rage, Manickam throws Saro out of the house during a heavy rainstorm. The next day, Chidambaram finds and brings her home. Meanwhile, Manickam vacates the compound house and moves back with his mother permanently.

Viji, struggling in her marriage, also returns to her father’s house. Leela, now pregnant, faces continued abuse from Ravi. He locks her up to prevent her from leaving. Ravi’s father eventually helps Leela return to Azhagarkulam. Saro gives birth to a son. Meanwhile, Manickam is brutally attacked by Ramesh over a family vendetta. At the same time, Bose is also hospitalized after being attacked by Ramesh. Both recover and return home.

Leela reveals the truth about Ravi’s abusive behavior and his previous marriage. Chidambaram’s family cuts ties with him. Ravi returns to take Leela back but fails. Facing pressure and guilt, Ravi begins blackmailing Leela.

Arundhathi, Balu’s daughter, is forced to marry Selvam, even though she loves a man named David. After discovering the truth, Arundhathi ends her marriage and reunites with David.

Santhosh, now jobless, returns from the U.S. Nirmala learns he misused her money. They argue, and he leaves, but later returns. Eventually, he betrays her by eloping with another woman, Julie. Nirmala is heartbroken. Sakthi, a humble woman who joins the office, begins developing feelings for Selvam.

Leela gives birth to twin girls, angering Ravi, who wanted a son. Viji gives birth to a son. Bose and Gopi start a business together, but it later creates a rift between them. The family relocates to Chennai. Bhavani begins her final year of schooling and catches the attention of Ramesh, who falls for her. Chidambaram arranges a spiritual trip to Devipattinam hoping for peace, but the trip is disrupted by an incident involving harassment and police intervention.

Gopi’s Kodaikanal trip is also ruined due to Rajam’s interference. Rajam and Nirmala leave Manickam’s house, and once again, Saro is blamed. Saro’s second pregnancy ends in miscarriage due to health complications.

Leela decides to become financially independent and starts working, despite Ravi injuring himself to stop her. Ramesh, after being rejected by Bhavani, becomes addicted to drugs and leaves home.

Six years later, Chidambaram and Bose have moved into a bigger house. Manickam, now an alcoholic, lives in a new home. Selvam remains unmarried. Nirmala has matured into a responsible working woman. Ravi still dislikes his daughters. Meanwhile, Viji, dissatisfied with her life in a joint family, begins creating rifts between Gopi and his relatives. She uses harsh and emotionally manipulative words to turn Gopi against them, hoping to break away and start a separate household, free from the influence and interference of his family.

Manickam hosts a housewarming event, during which Rajam insults Bose and Saro. An enraged Manickam physically assaults Saro, prompting her family to leave. Ravi also insults Chidambaram. Overwhelmed, and devastated further when Viji reveals her past, Chidambaram runs out of the house and is fatally struck by a lorry, dying in Gopi’s arms.

After his death, the family reconciles. Saro finally confronts Rajam and Manickam. The story ends on a hopeful note: Bhavani marries Murali, Selvam finds love with Sakthi, and Nirmala reconciles with Ramesh—marking a long-awaited moment of peace and redemption for the family.

== Cast ==
=== Main ===
- Delhi Kumar as Chidambaram – A land-broker; Dhanam, Saro, Leela, Viji, and Bhavani's father
- Kaveri as Dhanalakshmi alias Dhanam – Chidambaram's eldest daughter; Saro, Leela, Viji and Bhavani's sister; Bose's niece and wife
- Gayathri Shastry as Saroja alias Saro – Chidambaram's second daughter; Dhanam, Leela, Viji and Bhavani's sister; Manikam's wife; Rajam’s eldest daughter-in-law; Natarajan's mother
- Vanaja as Leelavathy alias Leela – Chidambaram's third daughter; Dhanam, Saro, Viji, and Bhavani's sister; Ravi's wife, Selvam's ex-lover
- Uma Maheshwari as Vijayalakshmi alias Viji – A Nurse; Chidambaram's fourth daughter; Dhanam, Saro, Leela and Bhavani's sister; Ilango's ex-wife; Gopi's wife.
- Revathi Priya as Bhavani – Chidambaram's youngest daughter; Dhanam, Saro, Leela, and Viji's sister; Murali's wife
- J. Venkatesan as Bose – Former owner of a soda factory; Chidambaram's brother-in-law; Dhanam, Saro, Leela, Viji, and Bhavani's uncle; Dhanam's husband.
- Chetan as Manikkam – A vegetable shop owner; Rajam’s elder son; Selvam and Nirmala's brother; Saro's husband
- Rajkanth as Ravichandran alias Ravi – A TV shop owner; Jeyamani and Meenatchi’s son; Sumathi's ex-husband; Leela's husband.
- Thirumurugan as Gopikrishnan alias Gopi – A sewing shop manager; Kathiresan's elder son; Kumar, Eshwari and Kavitha's brother; Viji's husband

=== Recurring ===
- Rajkumar as Mayilravanan aka Murali – Bhavani's husband
- Shanti Willams as Rajeshwari aka Rajam – Manikkam, Selvam and Nirmala's mother.
- Shanthi as Shanthi
- Vishwa Viswanathan as Selvam – Rajam's second son; Manikam and Nirmala's brother; Arundhati's ex-husband; Leela's ex-lover
- Krithika as Arundhati – Balasubramaniam and Deivanai's daughter; Selvam's ex-wife, David's wife
- Rindhya/Aruna Devi as Nirmala – Rajam's daughter; Manikam and Selvam's sister; Santhosh's ex-wife
- V. Thiruselvam as Santosh – A bank officer; Nirmala's ex-husband
- Shanmugasundari as Kamatchi – House owner patti
- Sai Nathan as Sivasamy – Manikam's former boss; Ramesh's father
- Vinayak as Ramesh – Sivasamy's son
- Sanjeev as Ilango – Viji's ex-husband
- Neelima Rani as Sakthi
- Sindhu as Sarala, Manikkam's former mistress
- Ramachandran as Ramachandran, Sarala's husband
- Sampathkumaran Sridharan (Auditor Sridhar) as Sundaram, Saro's uncle
- V. C. Jeyamani as Jeyamani, Ravi's father
- Ushapriya (K. Priya) as Meenatchi, Ravi's mother
- Gayathri Priya as Sumathi, Ravi's first wife
- Vietnam Veedu Sundaram as Kathiresan, Gopi's father
- Y. V. Subramaniam as Sumathi's father
- Rangathurai (Rajaguru) as Lakshmanan, Gopi's maternal uncle/elder brother-in-law
- Vijaya Raj as Sivaraman, Gopi's younger brother-in-law
- Latha Rao as Kavitha, Gopi's younger sister
- Karnan as Kumar, Gopi's brother
- N. Bhuvaneshwari (Bhuvana) as Eeswari, Gopi's elder sister
- Hema as Raji, Kumar's wife
- Geetha Ravishankar as Lakshmi
- Soundhar as Ponraj
- Sai Madhavi as Narmadha, Saro and Manikkam's neighbour, Meena's sister. Her mother runs Mess
- Deepa Shankar as Meena, Saro, and Manikkam's neighbour, Narmadha's sister. Her mother runs Mess
- Varshini as Malliga, Narmadha, and Meena's younger sister
- Rani as Ramya, Saro, and Manickam's neighbour
- Mousmiya/Latha Shalini as Radha
- Ashok Samuel as Radha's husband
- Sai Deepika as Sivasamy's wife
- Sukumaran Sairam as Shiva
- Nellai Sarathy as house owner Thatha
- Subbulakshmi as house owner Patti
- Sujatha Selvaraj as Gopi's colleague/staff
- Aranthangi Shankar as a bank manager
- B. Muralikrishnan as Ramesh's friend
- G. Danush as Ramesh's friend
- Jayaprakasam as Amarnath
- Ramnaath as Kamatchi's son
- R. M. Palaniappan as Balasubramanian, Arundhathi's father
- Anjalidevi as Deivanai, Arundhathi's mother
- C. N. Ravishankar as Sundar, Vasu's friend
- S. Gokulthilak as Gokul, Ilango's friend
- Viji Kannan as Harsha's mother
- Azhagu as Sakthi's father
- Thozhar. La. Ve. Aadhavan as Sakthi's father's creditor
- Black Pandi as a boy working in the market/room boy
- G. V. Vijesh as Nirmala's neighbour
- Julie as Vinodhini
- Amitha as Elizabeth
- Veera Srinivasan (K. Veera) is a lorry company owner
- R. Selvakumar as Chidambaram's customer
- J. Lalitha as, Nirmala's neighbour
- Ramdoss as a garment worker
- T. Sivakumar (Soodhu Kavvum Sivakumar) as Leela's colleague
- Kadugu Ramamoorthy as a marriage broker
- Chelladurai as a garment owner
- Kovai Senthil as a remediator
- Udhay as a photographer
- Aparna as a TV host
- Nathan Shyam as David's friend
- Balasubramanian (Bala Subramani/K. Balu) as a driver
- Venkatakrishnan as a lodge owner
- Sregajesh as a lodge guest
- Giridhar Thirumalachary as Arundhathi and David's professor
- Raja Rani Pandian as a hardware store owner
- Vaazha Meen Muthuraj as a boy working in the rice warehouse
- Soundarya as Mala
- Mythili as Jaya and Meena's teacher
- E. R. Malliga as a flower vendor
- Usha Elizabeth Suraj as a textile shop customer
- Swaminathan as a Raji's uncle
- C. Rajaappasamy as Madhusudhanan
- Jayakanthan as a police inspector
- P. S. Vijaya Kumar as a worker in the market
- Vijay Ganesh as Aarumugam
- E. Vikkiramathithan as Pazhani
- Baskar Sakthi as Kasirajan's lodge manager
- Livingston in a special appearance as himself
- Rambha in a special appearance as herself
- Vijayalakshmi in a special appearance as herself
- Indhu in a special appearance as herself
- Lavanya in a special appearance as herself
- Arunasri in a special appearance as herself
- Poorvaja (Karishma/Archana) as in a special appearance as herself
- Ramesh Khanna as in a special appearance as himself
- Vaiyapuri in a special appearance as himself
- Suraj in a special appearance as himself

== Production ==
=== Filming ===
This Serial was filmed in Chennai, Madurai, Papanasam, Palani, Courtallam, Kavaraipettai, Kanchipuram, Kodaikanal, Oddanchatram, Nerkundram, Gerugambakkam, Kovur, Porur, Kolapakkam, Mudichur, Valasaravakkam, Ramapuram, Muttukadu, Parangimalai, Devipattinam, Puducherry and Mumbai in India with some shots in Singapore.

=== Soundtrack ===
Track listing
No.	Title	Lyrics	Music	Singer(s)	Length
1.	"Ammi Ammi Ammi Mithithu அம்மி அம்மி அம்மி மிதித்து"	Vairamuthu	Dhina	Nithyasree Mahadevan, Master. D. Kiran	3:34
2.	"Manase Manase மனசே மனசே"	Eknath	Sanjeev Ratheen	S. P. Balasubrahmanyam	9:35

== Adaptations ==
Version 1
Language	Title	Original release	Network(s)	Last aired	Notes
Tamil	Metti Oli மெட்டி ஒலி	8 April 2002	Sun TV	18 June 2005	Original
Kannada	Mangalya ಮಾಂಗಲ್ಯ	12 April 2004	Udaya TV	2 November 2012	Remake
Malayalam	Minnukettu മിന്നുകെട്ട്	16 August 2004	Surya TV	2 January 2009	Remake
Hindi	Shubh Vivah शुभ विवाह	27 February 2012	SET	29 June 2012	Remake
Telugu	Akshintalu అక్షింతలు	14 April 2014	Gemini TV	15 August 2014	Remake

Version 2
Language	Title	Original release	Network(s)	Last aired	Notes
Bengali	Kanyadaan কন্যাদান	7 December 2020	Sun Bangla	5 February 2023	Original
Malayalam	Kanyadanam കന്യാദാനം	23 August 2021	Surya TV	Ongoing	Remake
Telugu	Kanyadanam కన్యాదానం	20 September 2021	Gemini TV	21 January 2023	Remake
Marathi	Kanyadan कन्यादान	17 October 2021	Sun Marathi	4 May 2024	Remake
Kannada	Kanyaadaana ಕನ್ಯಾದಾನ	15 November 2021	Udaya TV	18 May 2024	Remake

== Reception ==
=== Awards ===
The Metti Oli team won several awards, including the Kalaimamani from the Tamil Nadu State Government.

=== Ratings ===
Metti Oli was one of the highest-rated Indian and Tamil soap operas, garnering ratings ranging between 23 and 26 TVR. It hit a peak rating of 50.3 points overall in its runtime. The final episode garnered 45 TVR for Sun TV.

In 2008, the series was later re-telecast on Sun TV. In 2018, it was re-telecast on Moon. In 2020, it ran during COVID-19 pandemic, becoming one of the most-watched Tamil television program. It garnered 4.004 and 4.934 million impressions during week 12 and 13 of 2020.

=== Critics ===
Hindustan Times described Metti Oli as "highly melodramatic"
