= Aliyans =

Malayalam TV show

- Genre: Drama; Sitcom
- Based on: Aliyans vs Aliyans
- Written by: Various writers
- Directed by: Rajesh Thalachira
- Starring: See below
- Country of origin: India
- Original language: Malayalam
- No. of seasons: 2
- No. of episodes: 1,324

Production
- Producer: Ramji Krishnan. R
- Editor: Vijil
- Camera setup: Multi-camera
- Running time: 24 mins approx.

Original release
- Network: Kaumudy TV
- Release: 24 February 2020 – present

Aliyans is an Indian Malayalam-language sitcom directed by Rajesh Thalachira. It premiered on Kaumudy TV on 24 February 2020. It is the sequel to Aliyan vs Aliyan.

The show won the Kerala State Television Award for Best Comedy Programme in 2022. It is the longest-running television sitcom on Kaumudy TV and is also one of the notable sitcoms in the Malayalam-language. It reached well over a 1,000 episodes on 25 January 2025.

== Plot summary ==
Set in Thiruvananthapuram, the series centers on the life of Ratnamma and her family, with a particular focus on the complex, often humorous love-hate relationship between her sons-in-law, Kanakan and Cleatus. Each episode features standalone stories that explore various incidents and dynamics among the characters. Key figures include Thankam, Cleatus's wife; Lilly, Kanakan's wife; Muthu, the daughter of Cleatus and Thankam; and Ronald, the brother of both Lilly and Cleatus. Recurring characters also include Girirajan, the uncle of Kanakan and Thankam, and his wife Girija.

Years later, Cleatus has taken a temporary break from active politics and established a manpower recruitment agency. Kanakan has been promoted to the rank of Sub Inspector of Police. Thankam has been elected as a ward member representing a political party opposed to Cleatus's. Lilly works as a dance teacher. Akshaya, also known as Muthu, is pursuing medical studies while residing in a hostel and frequently visits home. She is in a romantic relationship with her neighbour's brother, Lallu.

== Cast ==
=== Main cast ===
- Aneesh Ravi as Kanakan Muthuraman
- Riyas Narmakala as Cleatus Mathai
- Soumya Bhagyan Pillai as Lilly
- Manju Pathrose as Thankam
- Akshaya as Muthu / Akshaya
- Raihu Shameer as Thakkudu (Episode:838 – present)

=== Recurring cast ===
- Abhilash Kottarakkara as Ronald
- Sethu Lakshmi as Ratnamma
- Mani Shornur as Girirajan/Ammavan
- Kannan Sagar as Thampi Annan
- Bindhu Sreehari as Girija Ammayi
- Anzar Babu as Ansar
- Salil S Nair as Natarajan
- Smitha S Anil as Sulu Chechi
- Resmi Anil as Rosemary
- Rithu Nilaa as Nallu
- Maya Suresh as Kunjammachi
- Arun Sreekantan as Indu/Indran
- Greeshma Ramesh as Parvathy
- Binoj Kulathoor as Ambilikkuttan
- Ramesh Kottayam as Pappa
- Arun Belland as Lallu
- Divya Krishnan as Sharmila

=== Guest cast ===
- Anumol as Bhama (Episode 85)
- Naveen Arakkal as Biju (Episode 85)
- Sheela as Herself (Episode 100: Special Wishes)
- Baby & Mary as Kudumbasree members (Episode 140)
- Shyam Mohan as Jayan (Episode 147)
- Akhil as Vallabhan (Episode 253)
- Uma Nair as Pavithra Unnikrishnan (Episode 264)
- Sarath as Joy
- Rishi S Kumar as Jithu/Jithendran
- Amrutha Nair as Jessy ( Episode 1052)
- Arjun as Tom ( Episode 1052)

== Writers ==
- Rajeev Karumadi (Base writer)
- Rajesh Thalachira
- Shihab Karunagapally
- Abhilash Kottarakkara
- Suku Killipalam
- Usman Koya
- Perumal Renjith
- S S Sumesh Kumar
- Riyas Narmakala
- Aneesh Ravi
- Soumya Bhagyan
- Manju Pathrose

== Awards ==
Year	Award	Category	Recipient	Result
2021	Rajnarayanjee Drishya Madhyama Awards	Best Actress (Comedy)	Maya Suresh	Won
2022	Kerala State Television Awards	Best Comedy Programme	Aliyans	Won
2022	Kerala State Television Awards	Special Mention (Jury)	Manju Pathrose	Won
2022	Janmabhoomi Television Awards	Best Comedy Actor	Aneesh Ravi	Won
2022	Media City Awards	Best Actor	Aneesh Ravi	Won
2024	Kerala Vision Television Awards	Best Director	Rajesh Thalachira	Nominated
2024	Kerala Vision Television Awards	Best Actor in a Comedy Role	Riyas Narmakala	Won
2024	Kerala Vision Television Awards	Best Actress in a Comedy Role	Manju Pathrose	Nominated
2024	Kerala Vision Television Awards	Best Actress in a Comedy Role	Soumya Bhagyan Pillai	Nominated
2026	Kerala Vision Television Awards	Popular Actor	Aneesh Ravi	Won
2026	Kerala Vision Television Awards	Best Actor in a Comedy Role	Riyas Narmakala	Nominated
2026	Kerala Vision Television Awards	Best Actress in a Comedy Role	Soumya Bhagyan Pillai	Nominated
