= Aliyan vs Aliyan =

- Genre: Drama; Sitcom
- Written by: Sreekumaran Araykkal
- Directed by: Rajesh Thalachira
- Starring: See below
- Country of origin: India
- Original language: Malayalam
- No. of seasons: 1
- No. of episodes: 502

Production
- Producer: Shivamohan Thambi
- Editors: Unni Nenmara; Satheesh Babu
- Camera setup: Multi-camera
- Running time: 22 mins approx.

Original release
- Network: Amrita TV
- Release: 17 February 2017 – 25 April 2019

Aliyan vs Aliyan was an Indian Malayalam-language sitcom directed by Rajesh Thalachira, broadcast on Amrita TV from 17 February 2017 to 25 April 2019. The show aired on every Monday to Friday at 9:00 PM (IST). The sitcom won the 2017 Kerala State Television Award for Best Comedy Program.

A sequel titled Aliyans aired on Kaumudy TV since 24 February 2020 with same cast.

== Plot summary ==
Set in Trivandrum, the story revolves around the life of Ratnamma and her family highlighting the daily incidents and the love-hate relationship between the two brothers in-law, Kanakan and Cleatus.

== Cast ==
=== Main cast ===
- Aneesh Ravi as Kanakan/Hawildar Veerabhadran
- Riyas Narmakala as Cleatus
- Manju Pathrose as Thankam
- Soumya Bhagyananthan as Jamanthi
- Sethu Lakshmi as Ratnamma
- Akshaya as Thakkilimol
- Mani Shoranur as Azhakesan Ammavan

=== Recurring cast ===
- Binoj Kulathoor as Ambilikkuttan
- Hari Nambotha as Mathukutti
- Sujith Kozhikode as Fazil
- Mani Shornur as Azhakeshan/Ammavan
- Rithu Nilaa as Nallu
- Azees Nedumangad as Azees
- Anzar Babu as Ansar
- Anu Joseph as SI Anupama
- Sajeev as Clara

=== Former cast ===
- Manikandan Pattambi as Kanakan
- Sneha Sreekumar as Jamanthi
- Salim as Fazil
- Kalabhavan Haneef
- Sini Prasad as Shyama
- Hari Nambotha as Maathan/ Mathukutty
- Kshama krishna as Rakhi
- Jeeva as Clara

== Awards ==
Year	Award Name	Category	Recipient	Result
2017	Kerala State Television Awards	Special Jury Award	Manju Sunichen	Won
2017	Kerala State Television Awards	Best Comedian	Riyas Narmakala	Won
2017	Kerala State Television Awards	Best Comedy Programme	Aliyan VS Aliyan	Won
