= Aniyathipraavu (TV series) =

Indian Malayalam television soap opera

- Genre: Soap opera
- Based on: Vanathai Pola by Raj Prabu
- Written by: Diego Jolly Jacob
- Screenplay by: Benny P
- Directed by: Jithesh K.; Dhanesh; G. R. Krishnan
- Starring: Deva Prasad; Deepika Aradhya
- Theme music composer: Nap Creative Team
- Opening theme: "Ponpaithale nin Punchiri" by Vidhu Prathap and Saritha
- Composer: Sanjeev Lal
- Country of origin: India
- Original language: Malayalam
- No. of seasons: 1
- No. of episodes: 530

Production
- Producers: Vishnu; Keerthi
- Cinematography: Vimal Krishnan; Ranju Mani
- Editors: Libin George; Anoop Thulasidaran
- Camera setup: Multi-camera
- Running time: 20-25 minutes
- Production company: VK Productions for Nap Communications

Original release
- Network: Surya TV
- Release: 25 April 2022 – 12 November 2023

Aniyathipraavu (transl. Younger Sister Dove) is an Indian Malayalam-language soap opera. The show aired from 25 April 2022 to 12 November 2023 on Surya TV and streams on-demand through Sun NXT. It stars Deva Prasad and Deepika Aradhya in lead roles along with R. Vishwa, Noobin Johny and Nazila Nazarudeen in pivotal roles. It is an official remake of Tamil soap opera Vanathai Pola.

== Synopsis ==
The story revolves around siblings Sreekanth and Sreelakshmi. After their parents' death, Sreekanth and Sreelakshmi were raised by their grandmother. Sreekanth is on the lookout for a suitable groom for Sreelakshmi. However, she repeatedly rejects the potential grooms as she doesn't want to leave her brother. As fate would have it, she falls in love with Sreekanth's nemesis, Rohit. Sreekanth and Sreelakshmi's cousin, Renjith, who is interested in Sreelakshmi will go to any lengths to marry her.

== Cast ==
=== Main ===
- Deva Prasad as Sreekanth: Panchayath President of Thonnoorkara village; Sreelakshmi's elder brother.
- Deepika Aradhya / Julie Hendry as Sreelakshmi: Sreekanth's younger sister; Renjith's wife.

=== Recurring ===
- R. Vishwa as Renjith Somarajan: Somarajan and Ambika's son; Sreekanth and Sreelakshmi's cousin; Sreelakshmi's husband.
- Avinash Ashok / Kiran Iyer / Noobin Johny as Rohit: A bank manager; Sreelakshmi's former love interest.
- Sivakami Kaimal / Nazila Nazarudeen/ Sreelakshmi Sreekumar as Architha: A thahsildar; Sreekanth's love interest.
- Deepa Jayan / Riya Thomas / Meenakshi Ashok as Sithara: Mohandas and Shobha's daughter; Sreekanth and Sreelakshmi's cousin.
- Sreekala V.K as Padmavathiyamma: Ambika and Mohandas's mother; Sreekanth, Sreelakshmi, Renjith and Sithara's grandmother.
- Kottayam Rasheed as Somarajan: Renjith's father.
- Soumya Sreekumar / Sangeetha Rajendran as Ambika: Renjith's mother.
- Venugopal / Manu Varma / Rudraprathap as Mohandas: Sithara's father.
- Yamuna as Shobha: Sithara's mother.
- Abhilash / Prajeesh as Manikuttan
- Vinayak as Akshay: Sreelakshmi's ex-fiancee.
- Divya Sreedhar as Kamala: Somarajan's sister
- Arjun Syam as Lechu's friend
- Resh Lakshna as Poornima
- Mithila Joby as Maya
- Resmi Rahul
- Mithun MK

=== Guest ===
- Mallika Sukumaran as Herself (2023)
- Reneesha Rahiman as Herself (2022, 2023)
- Jay Prakash as Herself (2022)
- Anna Dona as Herself (2022)
- Krishnakumar Nair as Herself (2022)
- Mariya Shilji as Herself (2022)

== Adaptations ==
Language	Title	Original release	Network(s)	Last aired	Notes
Tamil	Vanathai Pola வானத்தைப் போல	7 December 2020	Sun TV	Ongoing	Original
Telugu	Akasamantha ఆకాశమంత	4 October 2021	Gemini TV	21 May 2022	Remake
Marathi	Abhalachi Maya आभाळाची माया	17 October 2021	Sun Marathi	12 November 2022	Remake
Bengali	Adorer Bon আদরের বোন	8 November 2021	Sun Bangla	3 July 2022	Remake
Kannada	Anna Thangi ಅಣ್ಣ-ತಂಗಿ	22 November 2021	Udaya TV	Ongoing	Remake
Malayalam	Aniyathipraavu അനിയത്തിപ്രാവ്	25 April 2022	Surya TV	12 November 2023	Remake
