= Surabhiyum Suhasiniyum =

Indian Malayalam-language sitcom

- Genre: Drama; Sitcom
- Written by: Season - 1: Shyam R Babu; Shabeer B N; Kishore Aanakkode; Ajin Raj; Greenson Pious; Season - 2: Vamanapuram Mani; Shabeer B N; Shihab Karunagapally; Ajin Raj
- Directed by: Rajesh Thalachira
- Starring: See below
- Country of origin: India
- Original language: Malayalam
- No. of seasons: 2
- No. of episodes: 593

Production
- Producer: Roy P Antony
- Cinematography: Robin; Sidharthan
- Editor: Renold Dany Kurishinkal
- Camera setup: Multi-camera
- Running time: 22 mins approx.

Original release
- Network: Flowers TV
- Release: 13 August 2022 – 31 January 2025

Surabhiyum Suhasiniyum, also known as Su... Su..., is an Indian Malayalam-language sitcom directed by Rajesh Thalachira. It was broadcast on Flowers TV, with the first season running from 13 August 2022 to 24 November 2023. The second season aired from 29 July 2024 to 31 January 2025. The main cast includes Mallika Sukumaran and Anumol, with supporting roles played by Sidharth Prabhu, Manju Pathrose, Riyas Narmakala, Sangeetha Sivan, Aswathi Thomas, and Muhammad Rafi. Initially a weekend show, it gained popularity and began airing daily from 26 September 2022.

== Series overview ==
Series	Episodes	Originally released	
Series	Episodes	First released	Last released
1	431	13 August 2022	24 November 2023
2	162	29 July 2024	31 January 2025

== Plot summary ==
Set in Thiruvananthapuram, Kerala, the story revolves around the life of the constantly bickering duo of a woman and her mother-in-law due to their differences which lead to various complications for the family.

== Cast ==
=== Main cast ===
- Mallika Sukumaran as Suhasini Chandrahasan
- Anumol R. S. as Surabhi Pradheesh Chandrahasan
- Sidharth Prabhu as Pradheesh Chandrahasan
- Muhammad Rafi as Manoj aka Ondhu Manu
- Jayaram V. Jayaram as Prashobh Chandrahasan
- Sangeetha Sivan (Season 1)as Lakshmi Prashobh Chandrahasan
- Aswathy Thomas(Presilla Jerin)(Season 2) as Lakshmi Prashobh Chandrahasan
- Naiha Sunil as Aami Prashobh Chandrahasan(Season 1)
- Aaradhya Shiva (Paruu) as Pinky Prashobh Chandrahasan (Season 2)
- Riyas Narmakala as Ambadikannan / Vakkeel Uncle
- Sabu Sudarshan Pillai as മുത്തു
- Sunil Sugadha as Sreedhara Menon (Season 1)
- Sivaji Guruvayoor as Sreedhara Menon (Season 2)
- Jayakumar Parameswaran Pillai as manager Krishnanunni aka Unniyettan

=== Recurring cast ===
- Manju Pathrose as Kochammini
- Kalabhavan Haneef as Surendran
- Aswathy Nair as Achu
- Benny John as Suvarna Kumar alias Mudiyan
- Sreelatha Namboothiri / Sethu Lakshmi as Seetha Lakshmi
- Shakeela as Urmila
- Abhilash Kottarakkara as Ambu
- Sibi Joseph as Nikhil
- Ramdas Sopanam as Palani Chettiyar
- Krishnendhu Unnikrishnan as Nayanthara
- Sreeramya Manu as Aasha
- Ambili Nair as Thankamani
- Reshmi Anil as Shamala
- Sunil Sukhada as Sreedharan Menon
- Kutty Akhil as Prakash Chandrahasan
- Paaru as Devi
- Janardhanan as Colonel Vikram a.k.a. Vikramji

== Awards and nominations ==
Year	Award	Category	Nominee	Result	Ref.
2025	Kerala State Television Awards	Second Best Television Series	Surabhiyum Suhasiniyum	Won	
2025	Kerala State Television Awards	Second Best Actress	Anumol R. S.	Won	
