= Karyam Nissaram (TV series) =

- Genre: Sitcom; Comedy Drama
- Written by: Unni Cherian
- Directed by: Unni Cherian
- Starring: Aneesh Ravi; Anu Joseph; Kishore N. K.
- Country of origin: India
- Original language: Malayalam
- No. of seasons: 1
- No. of episodes: 1,104

Production
- Executive producer: Kalady Jayan
- Producers: Ajay Patadia; Manish Patadia; Gunawan Sulaiman; PMI Entertainment India Pvt Ltd
- Editor: Akhil Sundar S
- Camera setup: Baburaj
- Running time: 30 minutes

Original release
- Network: Kairali TV
- Release: 1 October 2012 – 2 June 2017

Karyam Nissaram was an Indian Malayalam-language comedy-drama television series written and directed by Unni Cherian. It premiered on Kairali TV on 1 October 2012 and concluded after airing a total of 1,104 episodes. The series holds the distinction of being the longest running serial on Kairali TV.

== Plot ==
The show follows the lives of Mohanakrishnan (Aneesh Ravi), a principled Village Officer, and his wife Sathyabhama (Anu Joseph), an assertive lawyer. Through daily episodes addressing various social and familial issues, the series humorously explores their contrasting viewpoints—rooted in traditional values and modern thinking—highlighting how ideological differences can coexist in a marriage.

== Cast ==
- Aneesh Ravi as K. Mohanakrishnan, Village Officer
- Anu Joseph as Adv. Sathyabhama, Mohanakrishnan's wife
- Kishore N. K. as Uthaman
- Thirumala Ramachandran as Shishupalan, Peon at Village office
- Sangeetha Rajendran as Swayamprabha, Clerk at Village office
- Prajusha Gowri as Kanchana, Clerk at the Village office
- Roslin as Mohanakrishnan's mother
- Amrutha Varnan as Mohanakrishnan's sister
- Anila Sreekumar as Advocate
- Sethu Lakshmi as Meenakshiyamma
- Karthika Kannan
- Sajan Surya
- Balaji Sharma as Advocate
- Indulekha S
- Yamuna Mahesh
- Sumi Santhosh

== Awards ==
Year	Award Name	Category	Recipient	Result
2016	Kalasamskrithi Awards 2016	Most Popular Actor	Aneesh Ravi	Won
2016	Kalasamskrithi Awards 2016	Best Actress	Anu Joseph	Won
2017	Flowers TV Awards 2017	Best Actor	Aneesh Ravi	Nominated
