= Kanyadanam (Malayalam TV series) =

Indian Malayalam television soap opera

- Genre: Soap opera
- Based on: Metti Oli; Kanyadaan
- Written by: S.Indran
- Screenplay by: S. Indran
- Story by: Thirumurugan
- Directed by: G. Marthandan; Riju Nair; Kichu Sudarshan; Manu V. Nair; Praveen Prakash
- Creative director: Zakir
- Starring: Devan
- Music by: Syam Dharman
- Opening theme: "Nattu Nanachu Valarthiya" by Madhu Balakrishnan
- Country of origin: India
- Original language: Malayalam
- No. of seasons: 1
- No. of episodes: 1800

Production
- Producers: E. A. Rajendran; Divyadarshan
- Production location: Kollam
- Cinematography: Prajith
- Editors: Subin Anakkara; Sadiq Mohammad; Anandhu Sheena
- Camera setup: Multi-camera
- Running time: 22-44 minutes
- Production company: Kalidasa Video Division

Original release
- Network: Sun Surya; Sun NXT
- Release: 23 August 2021 – present

Related
- Minnukettu

Kanyadaanam is an Indian Malayalam-language daily soap opera directed by Manu V. Nair. The show premiered on 23 August 2021 on Sun Surya. It stars veteran Devan along with newcomers Anna Dona, Aiswarya Suresh, Aswathy Pillai, Silpa Sivadas and Soufiya Zakhir in lead roles. It aires everyday on Surya TV and on-demand through Sun NXT. The show is an official remake of Bengali TV series Kanyadaan which itself was inspired from 2002 Tamil TV series Metti Oli. It is currently the longest-running soap opera in Malayalam.

== Plot ==
The show depicts the life of a doting father, Anandan and his four daughters. The story is about Anandan Mash, and, who face various challenges in life.

Anandan is a retired school teacher. He has five daughters, Ambili, Anupama (Anu), Chilanka (Cheeru), Daya and Manjadi. The girls' mother had died. Anandan is a respected man in the village and his daughters love him. Proposals start coming in for Ambili and Anu. A prospective groom for Ambili comes to meet her. He is Indran. Indran. All three of them were raised Indran is the dearest to Susheela and he would do anything for her happiness. They reveal a shock that the eldest child from two families shouldn't marry and that they want Anu as their daughter-in-law. Anandan agrees to Indran - Anu wedding while Ambili's wedding is fixed with Raghu. The two couples marry.

Indran's house is a small rented house in the city. Susheela's true nature starts to be revealed and soon she starts to torture Anu. Indran though loving towards her doesn't speak against his mother nor let anyone else. Sathyan is the only one in the house who truly cares for Anu's well-being. He sets up an astrologer who tricks Indran and Susheela that if the mother-son duo stay together, Susheela's life would be at stake. Fearing this, Indran moves to a compound house with Anu, with Susheela visiting him regularly. Cheeru and Sathyan, who have been meeting regularly, fall in love.

Daya is the spoilt brat among the girls and is arrogant. She gets acquainted with a man called Nandu. Nandu is a married man but hides the fact from Daya to cheat on her for his own pleasures. Despite warnings from Cheeru, Daya spends time with Nandu and in turn of events, she marries him and loses her virginity. Very soon, she learns about his true colours. Daya relocates and stays with Anu in her compound. Sathyan's love for Cheeru is revealed to Indran and Anu, and they are happy. But things don't turn out well as Susheela opposes the idea. Cheeru's wedding with Vinayan and both families agree. Cheeru tries to forget Sathyan and starts to convince herself.

Sabarinath alias Sabari is a man who works in the railways. He meets Daya and immediately falls in love with her, without knowing her actual name. When Sathyan calls for Sona, Daya comes out instead and Sabari mistakes her to be Sathyan's sister, Sona. Fallen in love, he brings his family to see 'Sona' but his family doesn't like her. Realizing it's the wrong girl, Sabari creates much confusion, angering Susheela. But finally, his marriage is fixed with Daya.

Cheeru and Vinayan and Daya and Sabari gets married.

== Cast ==
=== Lead ===
- Devan as Anandan a.k.a. Anandan Mash: A reputed retired school teacher; the head of Pancharathnam house; Mahalakshmi's widower; Ambili, Anupama, Chilanka, Daya and Manjadi's father; Raghu and Indrans's father-in-law. (2021–present)
- Aswathy U Pillai as Ambili: Anandan Mash's eldest daughter; Raghu's wife. (2021–present)
- Anna Dona (Episode 1-1227) / Lakshmi Balagopal (Episode 1228-)as Anupama (Anu): Anandan Mash's second daughter; Indran's wife.
- Aiswarya Suresh as Chilanka (Cheeru): Anandan Mash's third daughter; Sathyan's ex-lover; Vinayan's wife. (2021–present)
- Silpa Sivadas as Daya: Anandan Mash's fourth daughter; Nandu's ex-wife; Sabarinath's wife. (2021–present)
- Gopu Padaveedan as Raghuvaran (Raghu): Ambili's husband; Ananthan Mash's elder son-in-law and nephew; Anupama, Chilank and daya’s brother-in-law and cousin; Indran's co-brother. (2021–present)
- Krishnakumar Nair as Indrajith (Indran): Anupama's husband; Ananthan Mash's second son-in-law; Susheela's eldest son; Sathyan and Sona's brother; Harsha's ex-lover. He owns a profitable wholesale shop and a transportation company. (2021–present)
- Merlin Reena as Susheela: Indran, Sathyan and Sona's single-mother; Anupama's mother-in-law. (2021–present)

=== Recurring ===
- Devi Nanda (2021-2023)/Archana Krishna as Sona: Indran and Sathyan's younger sister; Susheela's daughter; Gokul and Varun's ex-girlfriend; Sabari's obsessive one-side-lover.
- Romel as Shyamsunder, Sona's husband
- Jishin Mohan as Vinayan: Chilanka's husband.
- Thomaskutty Abraham (episode 1-660)/ Alshan ( episode 661- ) as Sathyajith (Sathyan): Indran's younger brother; Susheela's second eldest son; Chilanka's ex-lover. (2021–present)
- Keerthi Krishna as Harsha Ravi: Ravikumar's wife.
- Archana Jayakrishnan as Maneesha Kanakarajan : Sathyan's ex-wife, Kanakarajan and Sindhu's daughter
- Master Krishna as Vishnu Indran:Son of Indran and anupama, grandson of Susheela and Ananthan
- Murali Mohan as Das: Ananthan Mash's best friend
- Baby Yami as Mahalaxmi Raghu: Daughter of Raghu and Ambili
- Anil Mathai as Sachidanandan (Sachi): A well-known businessman; Indran's mentor; Gokul and Indu's father.
- Surjith Purohit as Gokul: Sachi's son who cheats Sona to take revenge on Indran.
- Reshma Nair (Episode 1-1111)/ Avani Sivakavya(1170-) as Indu: Sachi's daughter and Sona's childhood friend.
- Diseema Divakaran: Sachi's wife; Gokul and Indu's mother.
- Akarsh Prakash / Godson Saji as Nandu: Daya's ex-husband; Aa money-minded womanizer and photographer.
- Binil Khader as Shabarinath (Sabari): Daya's husband.
- E.K.Rajendran as Ramanadhan: Sabari, Vasanthi and Ashokan's father.
- Devika Unni as Vasanthi; Ramanathan's eldest daughter; Dhananjay's wife; Amal's mother.
- Master Rahan as Amal: Vasanthi and Dhananjay's son; Sabari's nephew.
- Baby Sarayu: Vasanthi and Dhananjay's daughter, Sabari's niece.
- Manu Premkumar as Dhananjay
- ____ as Ashokan
  - Shabari and Vasanthi's brother
- Malu Gopika as Anitha, Ashokan's wife
- ____ as Sunder, businessman, shyam's father
- Indu Gopalakrishnan as Sindu Kanakarajan, Maneeshs's mother
- ___ as Kanakarajan
- Zamana Mehra as Nancy: Gokul's fiance and Sona's college senior.
- Midhun Sreekumar as Varun: Sona's boyfriend who later backs out from marriage.
- Vidhya Manoharan as Nila: Nandu's legal wife.
- Ishani Niya as Merin (2021)/ Kanakadurga(2023): Underworld woman who supports Nandu to cheat Daya/ Sunder 's wife, Shyam's stepmother
- Kannan as Balu: Nandu's bestfriend
- Indrajith as Nandu's assistant in the studio
- Sruthika Suresh /Raheena Anas as Aamy: A bold young entrepreneur who runs a food delivery unit for day-to-day livelihood, Suhara's daughter.
- Stelna as Gowrishwari: Cornel's wife.
- Lal Krish as Ravikumar: NRI; Harsha's husband.
- Vijayan as Vijayan, Indrans henchmen
- Payyanur murali as Balachandran, Vinayan's father
- Asha as Lathika Balachandran, Vinayan's mother
- Julie Hendry as Veena, Vinayan's first wife
- Firoz Khan as Deepak
- Mithun MK as Muralikrishnan: Chilanka's ex-fiancee.
- Rikshith as Manu, Manisha's ex-boyfriend
- Hashim as Sudharmab
- Sajin John as Prashob sudharman
- Lekshmi Sree as Pratibha Suharman
- Prabha R Krishnan as Prabhavathi Sudharman
- Shanal Chandran as Hemanth, Pramila's son, Gokul's best friend who stays at his house for rent
- Ameya Nair as CI Amritha
- Jaya Krishna as Dr.Rahul Vishwanathan
- Jolly Easow as Kunjamma

=== Guest ===
- Sandhya Rajendran as Mahalakshmi: Anandan Mash's late wife; Ambili, Anupama, Chilanka, Daya and Manjadi's mother. (Photo presence)
  - as Parvathy, Lakshmi's twin Sister
- Riyaz Khan as SP Jagan IPS (2022)
- Vijayakumari as Muthassi, Lakshmi and Parvathy's mother, Ananthan's mother in law
- Rekha Harris as Rathnaprabha

== Soundtrack ==
Original Songs
No.	Title	Singer(s)	Length
1.	"Mazhavillinezhu Niramulla"	Angel Mariya	1:23
2.	"Nattu Nanachu Valarthiya"	Madhu Balakrishnan	2:11
Total length:			3:34
