= Kanyaadaana =

Indian Kannada-language soap opera

- Genre: Soap opera
- Directed by: Arun Hariharan
- Starring: Mico Manju; Manasa Narayan; Keerthi Venkatesh; Yashaswini; Vidya Raj; Prarthana Kiran
- Country of origin: India
- Original language: Kannada
- No. of seasons: 1
- No. of episodes: 661

Production
- Camera setup: Multi-camera
- Running time: 21–23 minutes
- Production company: Anjali Ventures

Original release
- Network: Udaya TV
- Release: 15 November 2021 – 18 May 2024

Related
- Metti Oli; Kanyadaan

Kanyaadaana is an Indian Kannada language soap opera which premiered on 15 November 2021 in Udaya TV. The show stars Mico Manju, Manasa Narayan, Keerthi Venkatesh, Yashaswini, Vidya Raj and Prarthana Kiran. The show is an official remake of Bengali TV series Kanyadaan which itself was inspired from 2002 Tamil TV series Metti Oli.

== Cast ==
=== Main ===
- Mico Manju as Ashwatha
- Manasi Narayan as Archana
- Keerthi Venkatesh as Bhavana
- Yashaswini Ravindra as Chitra
- Vidya Raj as Deepika
- Prarthana Kiran as Aishwarya

=== Supporting ===
- Sushmit Jain as Karthik
- Deepa KN as Nirmala
- Sandeep Raju
- Pooja Purad
- Navaneeth Gowda
- Rohith Nagesh
