= Kairali TV =

Indian Malayalam-language television channel

- Logo used since 2000
- Type: Television channel
- Country: India
- Headquarters: Thiruvananthapuram

Programming
- Language: Malayalam
- Picture format: 576i SDTV

Ownership
- Owner: Malayalam Communications Ltd
- Key people: John Brittas (Managing Director); Mammootty (Chairman)

History
- Launched: 17 August 2000; 26 years ago (ചിങ്ങം 1)

Links
- Website: https://www.kairalinewsonline.com/

Availability

Streaming media
- Jio TV (India): SD

Kairali TV is an Indian Malayalam-language general entertainment free-to-air television channel owned by Malayalam Communications Ltd. It is headquartered at Thiruvananthapuram. It was launched on 17 August 2000.

== History ==
The channel was launched in August 2000 with Malayalam film actor Mammootty as chairman.

== Sister channels ==
=== Kairali We (Kairali Movies) ===
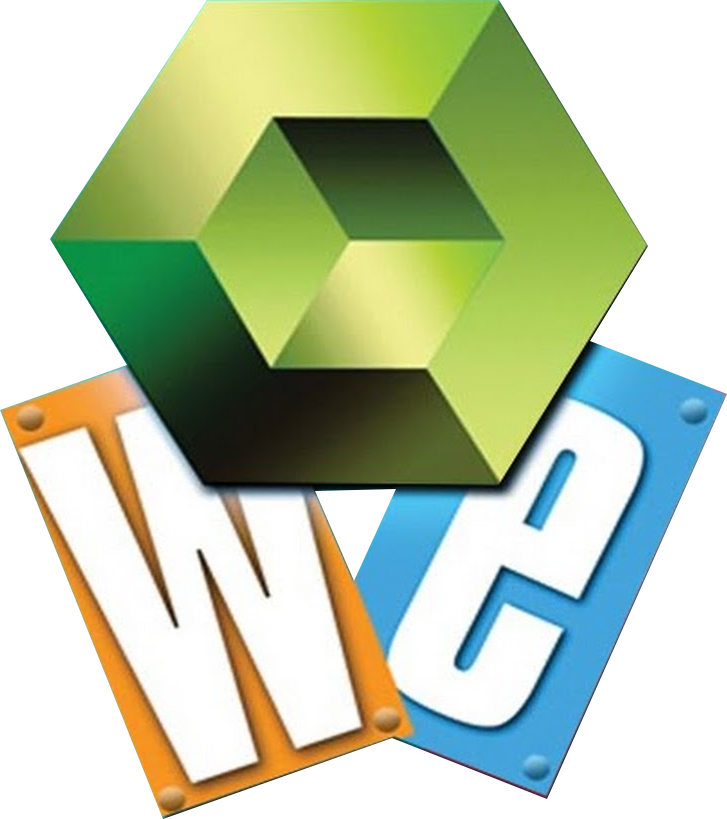
Kairali We Logo

Kairali We (Kairali Movies) rebranding soon is a Malayalam-language movie television channel in India, part of the Kairali TV network.

=== Kairali News ===
Kairali News is a 24-hour Malayalam-language news television channel in India, owned by the Kairali TV network.

=== Kairali Arabia ===
Kairali Arabia is a Malayalam-language television channel that caters primarily to the Malayali diaspora in the Arab states of the Persian Gulf. It is part of the Kairali TV network, owned by the Kairali Group.

== Former shows ==
=== Notable programming ===
- Atlas Ganopahaaram
- Big Screen
- Flavours of India
- Priyapetta Mammootty
- Amchi Mumbai
- Rhythm
- Symphony
- Grab The Spot Light
- Laya Tharang
- Kerala Cafe
- Jollywood Junction
- Fresh Hits
- Loud Speaker
- Nakshathradeepangal
- Kadha Parayumbol
- E 4 Elephant
- Sreeraamante Veritta Kadhakal
- Madhyama Vicharam
- Vasthu
- Veettamma
- Students Only
- Chamayam
- Hello Good Evening
- Pravasalokam
- Magic Oven
- Take One
- Shoot And Show
- Sing'n Win
- Manassiloru Mazhavillu
- Manimelam
- Madhuchandrika
- Dr. Talk
- Subhadinam
- Chirikkum Pattanam
- Surabhi
- Deepanjali
- Kanakazhchakal
- Star Ragging
- Dum Dum Pee Pee
- Colours of Kuwait
- Coffee With Boss
- Raindrops
- Penmalayalam
- Action Khiladi
- Dewdrops
- Jagapoka
- kairali on Demand
- Celebrity Kitchen Magic
- Comedy Thillana

=== Dubbed series ===
- 365: Repeat the Year (2026)
- Crime Patrol (2020)
- CID (2020–2021)
- Pranaya Varnangal (2017–2018)
- Powder (2018)
- The Game: Towards Zero (2026)
- Vicharana (2017–2020)
- Vikramadithyanum Vethalavum (2015–2016)

=== Original series ===
- Kunhamman – completed 2000 episodes
- A Amma (October 2007 – June 2008)
- Action Zero Shiju (December 2016)
- Akkara Kazhchakal (November 2008 – April 2010)
- Akkare Akkare (May 2008)
- Anna – Telefilm (January 2000)
- Aro Oraal
- Aarohanam (June 2001)
- Avasthantharangal (8 December 2001)
- Ayyadi Maname
- Chila Kudumba Chitrangal (January 2002 – May 2004)
- Chitashalabam
- Crime branch
- Daya (November 2006)
- Dosth (August 2012)
- December Mist – Telefilm (December 2000)
- Evide ellarkum sukham (March 2014 – July 2015)
- Homely Family (2023)
- Jagrata
- Kanakkinavu
- Kanamarayathu (October 2012)
- Karyam Nissaram – the longest running serial on Kairali TV (1104 episodes) (August 2012 – October 2017)
- Khalli Valli
- Krithyam – First Malayalam television serial based on Koodathayi case (October 2019)
- Kanalpoovu (2010–2011)
- Kochu Threseeya Kochu (November 2006)
- Kudumba Kodathi (May 2019)
- Kudumba Police (11 April 2016 – 27 January 2017)
- Lasagu
- Maaya (May 2001 - June 2002)
- Manasa Mynaa (February 2015 – September 2016)
- Mandaram (October 2005 – August 2006)
- Mandoos (October 2006)
- Mangalya Pattu
- Meghasandesham (November 2015 – August 2016)
- Mizhineerpookkkal (April 2015 – July 2016)
- Mounanombaram (October 2006 – July 2007)
- Mukesh Kadhakal
- Nanmayude Nakshtrangal – telefilm
- Nellikka
- Nilapakshi (July 2012 – May 2013)
- Onam Offer – telefilm
- Panchagni (October 2012 – January 2013)
- Piravikku Mumpe – telefilm
- Priyam (October 2005 – August 2006)
- Punchiri travels (March 2015 – April 2016)
- Salamath Café (May 2015)
- Summer in America
- Sumangali (June 2002)
- Sundari Mukku (December 2016)
- Sulthan Veedu (May 2004)
- Swantham Mallootty
- Ulkadal (May 2013)
- Ullathu Paranjal (October 2018 – May 2019)
- Umma Ariyatha Katha – telefilm
- Utopyan sarkar (January 2015)
- Velutha Kathreena (October 2006 – September 2007)(The serial was retelecast as Kanalpoovu during the first lockdown in 2020)
- Vermi

=== Reality shows ===
- Swaralaya Gandharva Sangeetham seasons 1–10
- Patturummal seasons 1–8
- Kadha Parayumbol
- Mampazham seasons 1–10
- Kuttypatturummal
- Kitchen Magic seasons 1–4
- Aarpoo Erro
- Tharolosavam seasons 1–3
- Little Stars
- Mummy And Me
- Star Wars
- Amma Ammayiyamma seasons 1–2
- Nakshatradeepangal (Tharolsavam Season 4)
- Manimellam
- Minnaminnge
- Aksharamuttam seasons 1–4
- Kutty Chef
