= Sun Surya =

Indian Malayalam language television channel

- Logo used since 2026
- Type: General entertainment
- Country: India
- Broadcast area: Worldwide
- Network: Sun TV Network
- Headquarters: Kochi, Kerala, India

Programming
- Language: Malayalam
- Picture format: 1080p HDTV

Ownership
- Owner: Sun Group
- Sister channels: Sun TV Network (Channels)

History
- Launched: 19 October 1998; 28 years ago

Links
- Website: Sun Surya

Availability

Streaming media
- Sun NXT (India): Sun Surya

Sun Surya (formerly known as Surya TV) is an Indian Malayalam language Indian general entertainment pay television channel owned by Sun TV Network. which is headquartered at Kochi. Sun Surya HD became the third Malayalam language high-definition channel.

== Current broadcast ==
=== Drama series ===
Series	Premiere date	Adapted from
Roopavathi	6 July 2026	Bengali TV series Roopamathi (dubbed)
Peythozhiyathe	30 June 2025	Tamil TV series Annam
Chattambipaaru	7 April 2025	Tamil TV series Singapennae
Kanyadanam	23 August 2021	Bengali TV series Kanyadaan
Swayamvarapanthal	17 February 2025	Tamil TV series Moondru Mudichu
Amme Mookambike	24 November 2025	
Thenmavin Kombathu	29 June 2026	
Anju Sundarikal	29 December 2025	Kannada TV series Gowripurada Gayyaligalu
Hridayam	20 November 2023	Telugu TV series Anu Ane Nenu

== Former broadcast ==
=== Original series ===
Series	Premiere date	Last aired	Adapted from	Total episodes
Mangalyam Thanthunanenaa	5 February 2024	28 June 2026	Tamil TV series Ilakkiya	863
Prema Pooja	16 December 2024	28 December 2025	Malayalam novel of same title	371
Constable Manju	6 May 2024	7 December 2025		553
Bhavana	26 June 2022	29 June 2025	Tamil TV series Kayal	1078
Aathira	13 January 2025	6 April 2025	Tamil TV series Marumagal	84
Anandharagam	17 April 2023	16 February 2025	Tamil TV series Anandha Ragam	656
Swargavathil Pakshi	23 September 2024	15 December 2024		84
Kanalpoovu	24 July 2022	27 October 2024	Tamil TV series Ethirneechal	812
Kaliveedu	15 November 2021	22 September 2024	Tamil TV series Roja	1000
Sundari	15 November 2021	21 July 2024	Kannada TV series Sundari	915
Ammakilikoodu	25 September 2023	24 March 2024		180
Ninnishtam Ennishtam	7 August 2023	20 January 2024	Tamil TV series Mr. Manaivi	159
Aniyathipraavu	25 April 2022	12 November 2023	Tamil TV series Vanathai Pola	530
Sita Ramam	13 March 2023	25 June 2023	Tamil TV series Sevvanthi	100
Swantham Sujatha	16 November 2020	12 March 2023		677
Manassinakkare	23 August 2021	26 November 2022	Kannada TV series Kavyanjali	411
Kana Kanmani	23 August 2021	23 July 2022	Telugu TV series Pournami	290
Ente Maathavu	27 January 2020	25 June 2022		573
Thinkalkalamaan	19 October 2020	23 April 2022		394
Indulekha	5 October 2020	7 May 2021		153
Varnappakittu	8 March 2021	21 May 2021	Turkish TV series Erkenci Kuş	53
Namukku Paarkkuvan Munthirithoppukal	22 June 2020	2 October 2020	Malayalam novel Nammukku Gramangalil Chennu Rapparkkam	74
Ithikkarapakki	27 January 2020	20 March 2020		40
Bhadra	16 September 2019	27 March 2020		139
Thamara Thumbi	17 June 2019	24 January 2020		157
Oridathoru Rajakumari	13 May 2019	27 March 2020		230
Chocolate	20 May 2019	20 March 2020		215
Ennu Swantham Jani	18 July 2016	13 September 2019		825
Thenum Vayambum	29 October 2018	10 May 2019		140
Gauri	29 January 2018	19 January 2019		255
Agnisaakshi	28 May 2018	7 July 2018		30
Sahayathrika	15 August 2016	9 September 2016		20
Kayamkulam Kochunniyude Makan	12 December 2016	16 June 2017		143
Akashadoothu	24 October 2011	4 October 2013		501
Minnukettu	14 August 2004	2 January 2009	Tamil TV series Metti Oli	1345
Sindhoorakkuruvi	30 August 1999	30 June 2000		220
Swantham Malooty	20 March 2000	22 June 2001		330
Amaavasi	20 March 2000	28 September 2001		400
Charulatha	12 June 2000	29 December 2000		145
Vava	2 July 2001	25 October 2002		345
Sthreejanmam	25 June 2001	28 March 2003		460
Thaali	1 January 2001	29 March 2002		325
Porutham	1 October 2001	10 May 2002		160
Manthram	12 June 1999	31 March 2000		190
Adharva Manthram	4 February 2002	25 October 2002		190
Manasaputhri	1 April 2002	20 September 2002		125
Oomakkuyil	13 May 2002	20 June 2003		290
Oru Nimisham	2 September 2002	30 May 2003		195
Thulasidhalam	31 March 2003	26 December 2003		195
Daivaththinte Makkal	10 Feb 2003	30 May 2003		80
Aalippazham	23 June 2003	30 April 2004		225
Pavithrabandham	21 July 2003	31 December 2003		116
Kayamkulam Kocchunni	3 May 2004	27 April 2007		780
Chitta	7 June 2004	28 January 2005		170
Kaavyanjali	2 August 2004	28 December 2007		890
Mounam	31 January 2005	27 May 2005		85
Nilavilakku	1 January 2008	8 November 2011		1006
Abhinetri	11 February 2013	26 March 2013		32+
Sarayu	13 May 2013	14 November 2014		395
Soubhagyavathi	7 April 2014	14 November 2014		160
Snehajalakam	17 November 2014	15 May 2015		130
Ammamaanasam	16 June 2014	31 October 2015		360
Sthreethwam	2 November 2015	4 December 2015	Shortest Episode	25
Mohakkadal	25 June 2012	12 October 2012		80
Snehakkoodu	18 July 2011	12 July 2013		520
Vadhu	3 March 2014	26 June 2015		345
Bhagyalakshmi	3 February 2014	27 August 2016		804
Chakravakam	8 May 2011	28 September 2012		365
Paattukalude Paattu	9 November 2011	25 December 2012		295
Makalude Amma	5 October 2009	27 May 2011		430

=== Reality shows ===
Show	Original telecast	Host	Adaptation of
Malayalee House	2013	Revathi	Big Brother
Deal or No Deal	2017	Suraj Venjaramoodu	Deal or No Deal
Laughing Villa	2016–2019	Jyothikrishna / Gayatri Arun	
Super Jodi	2018	Manikuttan	
Rani Maharani	2018–2019	Manikuttan	
Surya Super Singer	13 May 2019 – 12 July 2019	Ranjini Haridas and Dain Davis	
Mathura Pathinettil Prithvi	30 August 2020	Prithviraj Sukumaran	
Anchinodu Inchodinchu	2021	Suresh Gopi	Are You Smarter than a 5th Grader?
Aram + Aram = Kinnaram	2021	Shwetha Menon	
Adichu Keri Vaa	2025		
Fun Baby Fun	2025		
Namriti	2025		
Indumukhi Chandramathi	2011		
Kodeeshwaran	2001 - 2004	Mukesh	
Ponpulari	1999 - 2011		

== Sister channels ==
=== Sun Surya Movies ===

Sun Surya Movies (formerly known as Surya Movies) is an Indian Malayalam language music pay television channel owned by Sun TV Network. It was launched on 13 August 2013 by rebranding Kiran TV, which had originally been on air since 16 January 2005.

=== Sun Surya Music ===

Sun Surya Music (formerly known as Surya Music) is an Indian Malayalam language music pay television channel owned by Sun TV Network. It was launched on 13 August 2013.

=== Kochu TV ===

Kochu TV is an Indian Malayalam language kids pay television channel from Sun TV Network. It was launched on 16 October 2011.

=== Sun Surya Comedy ===

Sun Surya Comedy (formerly known as Surya Comedy) is an Indian Malayalam language comedy channel owned by Sun TV Network. It was launched on 29 April 2017.
