= Kanyadaan (2020 TV series) =

Indian Bengali television series

- Genre: Drama
- Created by: Babu Banik Production; Chitrayon
- Screenplay by: Arindam Guha; Dialogues; Kheyali Dastidar
- Story by: Sun TV Network Limited
- Directed by: Shuvo
- Starring: Arindam Ganguly; Deepsheta Mitra; Priya Malakar; Swapnila Chakraborty; Ritobrota Dey; Laboni Ghosh
- Country of origin: India
- Original language: Bengali
- No. of seasons: 1
- No. of episodes: 756

Production
- Executive producers: Poulomi; Oindrila (Sun Bangla)
- Producers: Arup Kumar Som; Sayantan Som Chitrayon
- Camera setup: Multi-camera
- Running time: 21 minutes (approx.)
- Production company: Babu Banik Production Chitrayon

Original release
- Network: Sun Bangla
- Release: 7 December 2020 – 5 February 2023

Related
- Phanguner Mohona

Kanyadaan is a 2020 Indian Bengali Language Drama television series which is premiered on 7 December 2020 on Bengali general entertainment channel Sun Bangla. The show is produced by Arup Kumar Som and Sayantan Som Chitrayon of Babu Banik Production Chitrayon and stars Arindram Ganguly, Priya Malakar and Manasi Sinha. The series is inspired from 2002 Tamil TV series Metti Oli.

== Cast ==
- Arindam Ganguly as Anjan Basu: Tithi, Nira, Moon, Bithi and Jinuk's father.
- Royshreema Das / Deepsheta Mitra as Tithi: Anjan's daughter; Nira, Moon, Bithi and Jinuk's sister; Rana's wife.
- Priya Malakar as Nira: Anjan's daughter; Tithi, Moon, Bithi and Jinuk's sister; Indra's wife.
- Swapneela Chakrabarty as Moon: Anjan's daughter; Tithi, Nira, Bithi and Jinuk's sister; Robi's wife.
- Ritobrota Dey as Bithi:Anjan's daughter; Tithi, Nira, Moon and Jinuk's sister; Sayan's wife.
- Laboni Ghosh as Jinuk:Anjan's daughter; Tithi, Nira, Moon and Bithi's sister.
- Ridish Chowdhury / Raj Bhattacharya / Aditya Roy as Rana: Tithi's husband.
- Nilankur Mukhopadhyay as Indra: Nira's husband.
- Daipayan Chakraborty as Bishu: Trisha's first husband; Moon's love interest.
- Neil Chatterjee as Sayan: Bithi's husband
- Aditya Chowdhury as Robi: Moon's husband
- Debojyoti Roy Chowdhury as Dr. Ayon

=== Recurring ===
- Manasi Sinha / Swagata Mukherjee as Mandira: Indra's mother.
- Debipriya Sarkar as Sona: Indra's sister; Sagnik's wife.
- Atmadeep Ghosh as Sagnik: Sona's husband.
- Shabnam Mustafi as Trisha: Mainak's wife; Bishu's former wife.
- Joy Banerjee as Mainak: Trisha's second husband.
- Ananda Chowdhury as Shiladitya: Trisha's brother.
- Sreejita Biswas as Snigdha: Bishu's love interest; Koushik's fiancee.
- Sudip Sengupta as Koushik: Snigdha's fiance.
- Hiya Roy as Radha: Ranjan's sister; Sona's friend.
- Sagar Sinha as Ranjan: Sona's former lover.
- Indranil Mallick as Abir: Bithi's former lover.
- Priyanka Rati Pal as Borsha: Indra's lover.
- Anindita Das as Nima
- Shubhanki Dhar as Kaveri
- Raima Sengupta as Nirmala
- Saibal Bhattacharya as Robi's father
- Parometa Mukherjee as Robi's mother
- Sukanya Basu as Sivani
- Anaya Ghosh as Mita
- Toushik Chakraborty as Rahul
