= List of Malayalam films of 2009 =

The following is a list of films produced in the Malayalam film industry in India in 2009.

== Malayalam films ==
Title	Director	Cast	Genre
Paribhavam	KA Devarajan	Abhilash, Kripa	
Orkkuka Vallappozhum (ഓർക്കുക വല്ലപ്പോഴും)	Sohanlal	Rejith Menon, Shilpa Bala, Thilakan	Drama
Love In Singapore	Rafi-Mecartin	Mammootty, Navneet Kaur, Salim Kumar, Jayasurya, Nedumudi Venu, Suraj Venjaramood,	Comedy
Colours	Raj Babu	Dileep, Roma, Vinu Mohan, Bhama, Innocent	Comedy, Family
Makante Achan (മകന്റെ അച്ഛൻ)	V. M. Vinu	Sreenivasan, Vineeth Sreenivasan, Suhasini	Comedy, Drama
Red Chillies	Shaji Kailas	Mohanlal, Siddique, Thilakan, Biju Menon	Crime, Thriller
Aayirathil Oruvan (ആയിരത്തിൽ ഒരുവൻ)	Sibi Malayil	Kalabhavan Mani, Sujitha	Drama
Kadha, Samvidhanam Kunchakko (കഥ, സംവിധാനം കുഞ്ചാക്കോ)	Haridas Keshavan	Sreenivasan, Meena, Prem Kumar	Comedy
Hailesa (ഹെയ്‌ലസാ)	Thaha	Suresh Gopi, Muktha George, Lalu Alex, Jagathy Sreekumar, Suraj Venjaramood,	Comedy
Bharya Swantham Suhruthu (ഭാര്യ സ്വന്തം സുഹൃത്തു്)	Venu Nagavalli	Jagathy Sreekumar, Mukesh, Urvashi, Padmapriya, Jyothirmayi	Family
Thirunakkara Perumal (തിരുനക്കര പെരുമാൾ)	Prasad Velacherry	Madhu, Babu Antony, Riyaz Khan, Seema	Family
Nammal Thammil (നമ്മൾ തമ്മിൽ)	Viji Thampi	Prithviraj, Geetu Mohandas, Indrajith	Comedy, Romance
Samastha Keralam PO (സമസ്ത കേരളം പി. ഓ)	Bipin Prabhakar	Jayaram, Serah, Priyanka, Salim Kumar	Comedy, Family
Sagar alias Jacky Reloaded	Amal Neerad	Mohanlal, Bhavana, Shobhana, Manoj K Jayan, Jagathy Sreekumar	Action, Thriller
2 Harihar Nagar (2 ഹരിഹർ നഗർ)	Lal	Mukesh, Siddique, Jagadish, Ashokan, Lakshmi Rai, Vineeth, Salim Kumar	Comedy
Banaras (ബനാറസ്‌)	Nemom Pushparaj	Vineeth, Kavya Madhavan, Navya Nair, Nedumudi Venu, Suraj Venjaramood	Romance, Musical
I. G.	B. Unnikrishnan	Suresh Gopi, Sai Kumar, Jagathy Sreekumar, Vijayaraghavan, Ashish Vidyarthi, Lakshmi	Action, Thriller
Moz & Cat	Fazil	Dileep, Ashwathy Ashok, Baby Niveditha, Rahman, Harisree Asokan	Comedy, Romance
Bhagyadevatha (ഭാഗ്യദേവത)	Sathyan Anthikad	Jayaram, Kaniha, Narain, Nedumudi Venu, Venu Nagavally, K.P.A.C.Lalitha,	Drama
Bhoomi Malayalam (ഭൂമി മലയാളം)	T. V. Chandran	Suresh Gopi, Priyanka Nair, Padmapriya, Samvrutha Sunil	Drama
Currency	Swathy Bhaskar	Jayasurya, Mukesh, Meera Nandan, Kalabhavan Mani, Suraj Venjaramood, Anoop Menon	Thriller
Black Dalia	Baburaj	Suresh Gopi, Vani Viswanath, Baburaj	Action
Bhagavan (ഭഗവാൻ)	Prashanth Mampilly	Mohanlal, Suraj, Lakshmi Gopalaswami	Action
Kancheepurathe Kalyanam (കാഞ്ചീപുരത്തെ കല്യാണം)	Fazil - Jayakrishna	Mukesh, Suresh Gopi, Jagadeesh, Muktha, Harisree Asokan, Jagathy Sreekumar	Comedy
Passenger	Renjit Sanker	Dileep, Sreenivasan, Mamta Mohandas, Jagathy Sreekumar	Suspense, Thriller
Vellathooval (വെള്ളത്തൂവൽ)	I. V. Sasi	Rejith Menon, Nithya Menen, Lalu Alex	Romance
Calendar	Mahesh	Prithviraj, Mukesh, Navya Nair, Zarina Wahab	Romance
Ivar Vivahitharayal (ഇവർ വിവാഹിതരായാൽ)	Saji Surendran	Jayasurya, Bhama, Siddique, Samvrutha Sunil, Suraj Venjaramood	Romance, Comedy
Dr. Patient	Viswanthan	Jayasurya, Mukesh, Radha Varma, Suraj Venjaramood, Jagathy Sreekumar, Mala Aravindan	Comedy
Malayali (മലയാളി)	C. S. Sudheesh	Kalabhavan Mani, Niya, Murali	Drama
Vilapangalkkappuram (വിലാപങ്ങൾക്കപ്പുറം)	T. V. Chandran	Priyanka, Suhasini, Biju Menon	Drama
Bhramaram (ഭ്രമരം)	Blessy	Mohanlal, Suresh Menon, K.P.A.C.Lalitha, Bhoomika, Murali Gopy	Thriller, Drama
Madhya Venal (മദ്ധ്യവേനൽ)	Madhu Kaithapram	Manoj K. Jayan, Swetha Menon, Arun, Niveda Thomas, Balachandran Chullikad	Drama
Ee Pattanathil Bhootham (ഈ പട്ടണത്തിൽ ഭൂതം)	Johny Antony	Mammootty, Kavya Madhavan, Suraj Venjaramood, Innocent, Undapakru	Comedy
Winter	Deepu Karunakaran	Jayaram, Bhavana, Manoj K. Jayan	Horror
Puthiya Mukham (പുതിയ മുഖം)	Diphan	Pritviraj, Bala, Meera Nandan, Priyamani, Sai Kumar	Action, Thriller
Bharya Onnu Makkal Moonnu (ഭാര്യ ഒന്നു് മക്കൾ മൂന്നു്)	Rajasenan	Rajasenan, Mukesh, Rahman, Jagathy Sreekumar, Sithara	Family
Rahasya Police (രഹസ്യപ്പോലീസ്‌)	K. Madhu	Jayaram, Sindhu Menon, Samvrutha Sunil, Jagathy Sreekumar, Suraj Venjaramood, Harisree Asokan	Action, Thriller
Parayan Marannathu (പറയാൻ മറന്നതു്)	Arun Bhaskar	Biju Menon, Arun, Lakshmi Sharma, Vidya Mohan	Drama
Ritu (ഋതു)	Shyamaprasad	Asif Ali, Rima Kallingal, Nishan	Drama
Katha Parayum Theruvoram (കഥ പറയും തെരുവോരം)	Sunil	Kalabhavan Mani, Padmapriya, Master Akash	Drama
Oru Pennum Randaanum (ഒരു പെണ്ണും രണ്ടാണും)	Adoor Gopalakrishnan	Praveena, Manoj K. Jayan, Ravi Vallathol, Jagadeesh, Sudheesh, Nedumudi Venu, Vijayaraghavan	Drama
Dalamarmarangal (ദലമർമ്മരങ്ങൾ)	Vijayakrishnan	Vinu Mohan, Sai Kumar, Nirmisha	Family (Artistic)
Daddy Cool	Ashique Abu	Mammootty, Richa Pallod, Master Dhananjay, Biju Menon, Radhika, Vijayaraghavan, Sai Kumar, Ashish Vidyarthi	Family
Kana Kanmani (കാണാ കൺമണി)	Akku Akbar	Jayaram, Padmapriya, Baby Niveditha, Biju Menon, Sukumari, Vijayaraghavan, Suraj Venjaramood	Horror, Family
Oru Black And White Kudumbam (ഒരു ബ്ലാക്ക്‌ ആന്റ്‌ വൈറ്റ്‌ കുടുംബം)	Saiju Anthikkad	Jayasurya, Kalabhavan Mani, Bhama, Suraj Venjaramood	Family
Shudharil Shudhan (ശുദ്ധരിൽ ശുദ്ധൻ)	Jayaraj Vijay	Mukesh, Indrans, Lakshmi Sharma, Kalabhavan Mani	Family
Decent Parties	Abraham Lincoln	Jagadish, Mukesh, Nedumudi Venu, Meera Vasudevan	Drama
Duplicate	Shibu Prabhakar	Suraj Venjaramood, Rupasree, Innocent, Salim Kumar, Aishwarya	Comedy, Romance
Loudspeaker	Jayaraj	Mammootty, Sasi Kumar, Jagathy Sreekumar, Innocent, Gracy Singh	Comedy
Vairam: Fight for Justice (വൈരം)	M. A. Nishad	Pasupathy, Suresh Gopi, Jayasurya, Jagathy Sreekumar, Mukesh, Meera Vasudevan, Samvrutha Sunil, Dhanya Mary Varghese	Drama
Robin Hood	Joshiy	Prithwiraj, Narain, Bhavana, Jayasurya, Biju Menon, Samvrutha Sunil, Salim Kumar	
Kerala Varma Pazhassi Raja (പഴശ്ശിരാജാ)	T. Hariharan	Mammootty, Sarath Kumar, Suman, Padmapriya, Manoj K. Jayan, Kanika Subramaniam, Captain Raju, Jagatheesh, Suresh Krishna, Nedumudi Venu, Thilakan, Jagathy Sreekumar, Lalu Alex, Devan, Linda Arsenio	Action
Seetha Kalyanam (സീതാ കല്യാണം)	T. K. Rajeev Kumar	Jayaram, Jyothika, Geethu Mohandas, Indrajith, Siddique	Romance
Angel John	S. Y. Jayasurya	Mohanlal, Shanthnoo Bhagyaraj, Lalu Alex, Nithya Menen, Ambika, Jagathy Sreekumar	Drama
Kerala Cafe	Ranjith, Shaji Kailas, Anwar Rasheed, Lal Jose, B. Unnikrishnan, Shyama Prasad, Revathi Menon, Anjali Menon, Shankar Panikkar, Rama Krishnan, M. Padmakumar, Uday Anadan	Mammootty, Suresh Gopi, Prithwiraj, Rahman, Suraj Venjaramood, Jayasurya, Siddique, Salim Kumar, Jagathy Sreekumar, Nithya Menen, Dhanya Mary Varghese	Drama
Swantham Lekhakan (Swa. Le) (സ്വന്തം ലേഖകൻ (സ്വ. ലേ))	P. Sukumar	Dileep, Gopika, Innocent, Jagathy Sreekumar, Vijayaraghavan, Ashokan, Nedumudi Venu	Drama, Romance
Utharaswayamvaram (ഉത്തരാസ്വയംവരം)	Remakanth Sarju	Jayasurya, Roma, Lalu Alex, Suraj Venjaramood, Sai Kumar, Balachandra Menon	Romance, Comedy
Neelathaamara (നീലത്താമര)	Lal Jose	Kailash, Archana Kavi, Samvrutha Sunil, Suresh Nair	Drama
Patham Nilayile Theevandi (പത്താം നിലയിലെ തീവണ്ടി)	Joshi Matthew	Jayasurya, Meera Nandan, Innocent	Drama
Chemistry	Viji Thampi	Mukesh, Vineeth, Manoj K. Jayan, Siddique, Jagathy Sreekumar, Harishree Ashokan, Ashokan, Saranya Mohan	Crime
Kappal Muthalaali (കപ്പല്‌ മുതലാളി)	Thaha	Ramesh Pisharodi, Mukesh, Jagathy Sreekumar, Suraj Venjaramood, Salim Kumar, Mammukkoya, Sarayu	Comedy
Gulumaal: The Escape (ഗുലുമാൽ)	V. K. Prakash	Kunchako Boban, Jayasurya, Maniyan Pillai Raju, Nedumudi Venu, Suraj Venjaramood, Salim Kumar, Jagathy Sreekumar	Comedy
My Big Father	Mahesh P. Sreenivasan	Jayaram, Undapakru, Kanika Subramaniam, Innocent, Jagathy Sreekumar, Suraj Venjaramood	Comedy
Paleri Manikyam: Oru Pathira Kolapathakathinte Katha (പാലേരിമാണിക്യം ഒരു പാതിരാക്കൊലപാതകത്തിന്റെ കഥ)	Ranjith	Mammootty, Gowri Munjal, Sreenivasan, Siddique, Shweta Menon, Mythili	Thriller
Keralotsavam 2009 (കേരളോത്സവം 2009)	Shankar Panicker	Vinu Mohan, Vishnupriya, Kalabhavan Mani, Nedumudi Venu	Drama
Evidam Swargamanu (ഇവിടം സ്വർഗ്ഗമാണു്)	Roshan Andrews	Mohanlal, Thilakan, Lakshmi Rai, Priyanka, Lakshmi Gopalaswami, Sreenivasan, Jagathy Sreekumar, Innocent	Drama
Chattambinadu (ചട്ടമ്പിനാടു്)	Shafi	Mammootty, Vinu Mohan, Laxmi Rai, Meenakshi, Mythili, Suraj Venjaramood, Manoj K. Jayan, Siddique	Action, Thriller, Comedy
Paribhavam (പരിഭവം)	K. A. Devarajan	Abhilash, Kripa	
Raamanam (രാമാനം)	M. P. Sukumaran Nair	Jagathy Sreekumar, Indrans, Manju Pillai	
Sanmanassullavan Appukuttan (സന്മനസ്സുള്ളവൻ അപ്പുക്കുട്ടൻ)	G. M. Manu	Jagathy Sreekumar, Priyadarsini	Family
Nizhal	Santhosh Kumar	Jagan, Sarayu, Salim Kumar, Devan	
Meghatheertham		Manikkuttan, Sai Kumar, Kaviyoor Ponnama, Aparna Nair	
Mounam	Suresh Machaad		
Pramukhan	Salim Baba	Kalabhavan Mani	
Samayam			

== Dubbed films ==
Title	Director	Cast	Genre
Ithu Njangalude Lokam	Khader Hassan	Varun Sandesh, Shwetha Prasad	

== Notable deaths ==
Month	Date	Name	Age	Profession	Notable films
January	31	Nagesh	75	Actor	Valarthumrugangal • O' Faby
April	25	Kalamandalam Kesavan	72	Actor	Kathanayakan • Vanaprastham • Valathottu Thirinjal Nalamathe Veedu • Vettam
May	20	Shobhana Parameswaran Nair	83	Producer	Ninamaninja Kaalpaadukal • Kallichellamma • Nagarame Nandi • Murapennu
June	28	A. K. Lohithadas	54	Scriptwriter, Director	Thaniyavarthanam • Kireedam • Bharatham • Amaram • Kasthooriman
July	29	Rajan P. Dev	56	Actor, Director	Indrajalam • Thommanum Makkalum • Chota Mumbai
August	6	Murali	55	Actor, Writer	Neythukaran • Aadhaaram • The King • Pathram • Amaram
October	25	Adoor Bhavani	82	Actress	Chemmeen • Kallichellamma
November	22	T T Sainoj	32	Playback Singer	War and Love • Orkkuka Vallappozhum • Ivar Vivahitharayal
December	30	Vishnuvardhan	59	Actor	Kauravar
