= Krishna Praba =

Indian actress

- Praba in 2016
- Born: Ernakulam, Kerala, India
- Occupations: Actor; classical dancer
- Years active: 2005–present

Krishna Praba is an Indian actress, television presenter, and classical dancer who predominantly appears in Minor supporting roles in Malayalam films. She made her debut as small supporting role in the film Madampi (2008), directed by B. Unnikrishnan. She played the character Mollykutty in Life of Josutty (2015), directed by Jeethu Joseph.

== Early life ==
Krishna Praba was born to the late C. R. Prabhakaran Nair, a former mechanical engineer at Kalamassery HMT and Sheela Prabhakaran Nair. She completed her primary education from St. Joseph's School, Kalamassery and obtained her Higher Secondary Education in humanities from Sacred Heart College, Thevara. Her early influences included Mohiniyattam, Kuchipudi, Drama and Margamkali. She received a Diploma in Bharatanatyam from the Alliance University in Bangalore. Praba was trained in classical dance under the mentorship of Kalamandalam Sugandhi, her first dance teacher, from the age of three.

== Career ==
Praba made her debut in B. Unnikrishnan’s Madampi in 2008. She grew a stature in the Malayalam film industry by playing different characters in a series of films, most notably in Natholi Oru Cheriya Meenalla (2013) and Life of Josutty (2015). In 2017, Praba joined a number of award-winning students to enact Radha Madhavam, a dance drama directed by actress Gayathri.

== Filmography ==
=== Films ===
Year	Title	Role	Notes
2005	Boyy Friennd	College student	
2008	Parthan Kanda Paralokam	Village girl	
2008	Madampi	Bhavani	
2009	Utharaswayamvaram	Vimala	
2009	Raamanam	Neeli	
2009	Oru Black and White Kudumbam	Suma	
2009	My Big Father	Ancy's friend	
2009	Gulumaal: The Escape	Air Hostess	
2009	Passenger	Receptionist	
2009	Swantham Lekhakan	Bride	
2009	Colours	Rahul's sister	
2009	Thirunakkara Perumal	Nun	
2009	Dr. Patient	Nurse	
2010	Pramani	Office staff	
2010	Best of Luck	Jameela	
2010	Janakan	Nurse Raji	
2010	Kadaksham	Kallambalam Sumarani	
2010	Kaaryasthan	Herself	
2011	Orma Mathram	Sudhamani	
2011	August 15	Thief	
2011	Teja Bhai & Family	Drama Family Member	
2012	Ee Adutha Kaalathu	Bindhu	
2012	Naughty Professor	Student	
2012	Trivandrum Lodge	Roslin	
2012	Kaashh	Servant	
2012	Karmayodha	Rena	
2012	Kalikaalam	Maid	
2013	3G Third Generation	Menaka	
2013	Police Maaman	Shankunni's sister	
2013	Natholi Oru Cheriya Meenalla	Kumari	
2013	Left Right Left	Serial actress	
2013	Hotel California	Soosie	
2013	Kadal Kadannu Oru Maathukutty	Deepa	
2013	Ezhu Sundara Rathrikal	Manjusha	
2013	Oru Indian Pranayakadha	Sudha	
2013	Vedivazhipadu	Sajitha	
2014	Salaam Kashmier	Mrs. Chandran	
2014	Polytechnic	Saritha	
2014	Garbhasreeman	Vimala Prabhakaran	
2015	She Taxi	Sradha	
2015	Love 24x7	Nimisha	
2015	Life of Josutty	Mollykutty	
2016	Ithu Thaanda Police	CPO Annamma George	
2016	Kolumittayi	Molly	
2017	Fukri	Clara	
2017	Honey Bee 2: Celebrations	Ancy	
2017	Honey Bee 2.5	Herself	
2017	Theeram	Itha	
2017	Melle	Betty	
2018	Kallai FM	Jameela	
2019	Allu Ramendran	CPO Rani	
2019	Mask	Mrs. Najeeb	
2020	Varky	Dr. Perly	
2021	Drishyam 2	Mary Jose	
2022	Nishabdham	Lakshmi	
2022	Makal	Dance Teacher	
2022	Bheethi		
2022	Ela Veezha Poonchira	Bus Traveller	
2022	King Fish	Krishna	
2022	Ulkkazcha	Deepa	
2022	My Name is Azhakan	Rekha	
2023	Live		
2023	Pulimada	CPO Anasuya	
2023	Neru	Doctor	
2025	Thudarum	Seema	
2026	Dridam	CPO Remya Surendran	
2026	Drishyam 3	Mary Jose	
2026	Unmadham	Rimi	

=== Television serials ===
Year	Show	Channel	Ref.
2005	Mukesh Kathakal	Kairali TV	
2005	Nanmayude Nakshathrangal	Kairali TV	
2008	Twenty Twenty One	Asianet	
2009	Kanal Kireedam	Asianet	
2009	Enkilum Ente Gopalakrishna	Asianet	
2010	Sree Mahabhagavatham	Asianet	
2010	Devi Mahatmyam	Asianet	
2010	Alaudinte Albuthavilakku	Asianet	
2011	Aakashadoothu	Surya TV	
2014	Snehaveedu	Surya TV	
2019	Suharayum Suhasiniyum	Asianet	
2020	Life is Beautiful (Season 2)	Asianet	
2021-2024	Kaliveedu	Surya TV	
2023	Bhavana	Surya TV	Cameo appearance
2024	Meenu's Kitchen	Mazhavil Manorama	Cameo appearance

==== Other shows ====
- Comedy Show - Asianet, Anchor
- Tharotsavam (Reality Show) - Kairali TV, Participant
- Shubharathri (Talk show) - Jeevan TV, Anchor
- Chill.bowl (cookery show) - Asianet, Anchor
- Onaruchi (cookery show) - Kerala Vision, Presenter
- Smart Show (Game Show) - Flowers TV, Participant
- Don't Do Don't Do (Game Show) - Asianet Plus, Participant
- Fast Track - Manorama News, Presenter
- Ente Thamasha - Janam TV, Presenter
- Laitham 50 - Mazhavil Manorama, Dancer
- Thamasha Bazaar (comedy talk show) - Zee Keralam, Honey
- Onam Bumper - Zee Keralam, Anchor
- PCyodoppam Personalayi - Amrita TV, Host
- Immini Baliya Naavu - Surya TV, Presenter
- Komady Circurs - Mazhavil Manorama, Special Judge
- Funs Upon a time - Amrita TV, Special Judge
- Parayam Nedam - Amrita TV, Participant
