= Chattambinadu =

- Movie poster
- Directed by: Shafi
- Screenplay by: Benny P Nayarambalam
- Produced by: Noushad; Anto Joseph
- Starring: Mammootty; Siddique; Manoj K. Jayan; Suraj Venjarammoodu; Vinu Mohan; Raai Laxmi; Salim Kumar
- Cinematography: Manoj Pillai
- Edited by: V. Saajan
- Music by: Alex Paul
- Production companies: Big Screen Productions; Play House
- Distributed by: Play House Release
- Release date: 24 December 2009
- Running time: 135 minutes
- Country: India
- Language: Malayalam

Chattambinaadu (English: The Rowdy Land) is a 2009 Indian Malayalam-language action comedy film directed by Shafi and written by Benny P. Nayarambalam. The film was made under Mammootty's production company Play House which distributed it as well. The film stars Mammootty, Siddique, Manoj K. Jayan, Suraj Venjaramoodu, Vinu Mohan, Raai Laxmi and Salim Kumar. The film's music was done by Alex Paul.

Chattambinadu was released on 24 December 2009, on 80 screens in Kerala. Despite getting mixed reviews from critics the film was a commercial success, becoming the Christmas winner. The character played by Suraj Venjarammoodu, Dasamoolam Damu, has over the years attained cult status and remains one of Suraj Venjaramoodu's most memorable roles.

== Plot ==
The movie tells the story of a village called Chembattunadu in Palakkad district of Kerala, which is popular as Chattambinadu for the presence of several goons and hooligans. According to retired goons Chenkeeri Madhavan and Vadival Vasu, it was the severe animosity between Mallanchira and Kattappilly families that has caused the arrival of several goons to the land, including them, which made Chattambinadu notorious. The film begins with Mallanchira Chandramohan's plan to sell off his mansion, to pay up his heavy debts. But Kattappilly Nagendran, the present leader of Kattappilly faction, plays all ways to stop the sale. The local police inspector informs Chandramohan about Veerendra Mallaya, a rich businessman, who is a dreaded and powerful gangster in Karnataka, who also has strong passion in real estate. Chandramohan approaches Mallayya, who refuses to take up the mansion in the beginning. But upon the request from Dr. Lakshmi, his friend, who also hails from Chattambinadu, he decides to buy the property, inviting strong opposition from Nagendran. Mallayya, who speaks Malayalam with strong Kannada accent, arrives at Chattambinadu along with Murukan, his secretary, who is also more like his brother. At Chattambinadu, he comes across Vadival Vasu and his daughters Gowri and Meenakshi. To create a rift among the villagers and Mallaya, under the instruction, Dashamoolam Damu, a foolish assistant of Nagendran, on one night steals the lorry of Mallayya and drives it into the house of Vasu, demolishing it. However, Mallayya promises to repair the house with his own money. Murugan, who within this time had developed a soft feeling towards Meenakshi, takes them along with Maakri Gopalan to Mallayya's house. Dr. Lakshmi on her day of arrival at Chattambinadu on vacation learns from her brother that Nagendran has decided to marry her, without the approval of her parents. Shocked Lakshmi even witnesses Nagendran violently thrashing her fiancé, making him flee. Lakshmi explains her condition to Mallayya, who promises her all help. Gowri, who witnesses their conversation mistakes them of being in love. She gets jealous as she had within this time fell in love with him.

Chandramohan, on a casual talk, tells Mallayya, about Veeru, his servant boy, who had once attacked his father Unnithan and ran away with all his hard earned money. Chandramohan also adds that his only aim in life is to find out Veeru and avenge him by killing him for the crime done to his father. Mallaya, on hearing this story is really shocked as he is Veeru, who had once ran away. Chandramohan, on understanding the relation between Meenakshi and Murugan, approaches Mallayya to get them married. Also Vasu wants Mallayya to marry Gowri, his elder daughter. One night Mallayya reveals his story to Vasu, whom he had assaulted with sword in a bid to escape years back. Unnithan had got Veeru, a Kannadiga street urchin, who understood not a single world in Malayalam. Unnithan and his family took care of him well and treated him as their own son. One day, in middle of a trip, Unnithan gets into an argument with Nagendran's father Kuruppu, who tries to snatch the suitcase consisting of a huge amount of money. In an attempt to save Unnithan, Veeru attacks Kuruppu and on the advice of Unnithan, runs away with the bag. But on hearing a sound of Unnithan, he comes back to see that Unnithan is severely wounded as attacked by Nagendran. Kuruppu, then calls up people and tells them that it is Veeru who had killed Unithan, making him run for life. In an attempt to save himself, he stabs Vasu on his leg. The police inspector, who arrests him after a couple of days interrogates in Malayalam, and Veeru, who knows not a single word in Malayalam is confused, where by accepts his charges. But on realising that he is framed, he escapes from police and jumps into a river. He also adds that it is revealed that Kuruppu is also behind the crime. Mallaya is also shocked to find Unnithan at the house of Chandramohan, who is alive, but now paralysed, who also had lost the ability to speak after the incident.

Nagendran, at the meantime, has gone forward with his plan to marry Lakshmi, but is saved by Mallaya, who gets her married to her fiancé. Mallaya is shocked to see the old police inspector, who is now the father of the husband of Lakshmi. He shows his willingness to help Mallayya to reveal the truth to Chandramohan, but is killed by Nagendran on the same night. The people of Chattambinadu, within this time realises that Mallayya is Veeru and is waiting for his arrival to get him killed. Nagendran expands his net and gets the crowd to gather at the spot where Mallayya arrives. The rest of the story is how Mallayya succeeds in proving his innocence and has Nagendran killed by the public.

== Cast ==
- Mammootty as Veerendra Mallayya (Veeru)
  - Anu Mohan as Young Veeru
- Suraj Venjaramoodu as Dasamoolam Damu
- Salim Kumar as Maakri Gopalan
- Siddique as Kattappilly Nagendran
- Manoj K. Jayan as Mallanchira Chandramohan
- Vinu Mohan as Murugan
- Raai Laxmi as Gauri (Voice-over by Sreeja Ravi)
- Meenakshi as Dr. Lakshmi (Voice-over by Sreeja Ravi)
- Mythili as Meenakshi
- Janardanan as Vadival Vasu
- Mohan Jose as Panickar
- Vijayaraghavan as Mallanchira Unnithan
- T. P. Madhavan as Mallayya's secretary and Murugan's father
- Sai Kumar as Rtd. DYSP Krishnadas
- Ambika Mohan as Murukan's mother
- Spadikam George as CI Ayyappan, police officer
- Saju Kodiyan as Sugunan, police officer
- V. K. Sreeraman as himself
- Kalabhavan Navas as Manikandan
- T. G. Ravi as Chenkeeri Madhavan
- Rony David as Sivankutty, Lakshmi's brother
- Boban Alummoodan as Santhosh, Lakshmi's fiancée
- Balachandran Chullikadu as Kattappilly Cheriya Kuruppu
- Chembil Ashokan as Kannappan, a villager
- Narayanankutty as Paramu Pillai
- Kalasala Babu as Kattappilly Kuruppachan
- Shobha Mohan as Rukmini, Unnithan's wife and Chandramohan's mother
- Besant Ravi as Vadakumala goon
- Mohanlal (television scene)
- Bindu Murali

== Music ==
1. "Chattambinaadu" - Ramesh Babu, Reju Joseph, Vidhu Prathap
2. "Chenkadalikkumbilile" - Rimi Tomy
3. "Mukkuttichaanthaniyunne" - Manjari
4. "Mukkuttichaanthaniyunne [D]" - Manjari, Vidhu Prathap
5. "Oru Kadha Parayaam - C. J. Kuttappan

== Reception ==
=== Critical reception ===
Reviewing Chattambinadu, Paresh C. Palicha of Rediff called the film a rehash of Rajamanikyam (2005) and wrote, "Though Benny P Nayarambalam's script relies heavily on humour, it lacks the sharpness of his previous works. In the final analysis, we can say that law of averages has caught up with Mammootty, whose last few outings before Chattanmbinadu were very good." Veeyan of Now Running gave the film two stars out of five and wrote, "Chattambinaadu is certainly not a film that you should expect to transform the world. Just sit back, relax and hang around for the laughs. Or head straight for the park and get some fresh air instead." IndiaGlitz criticised the movie's formulaic predictability.

=== Box office ===
Chattambinadu released on 24 December 2009, in 80 screens in Kerala. Sify reported that the film had taken a distributors share of around ₹3 crore (US$310,000) from releasing stations in the first five weeks. The film was box office success.

== In popular culture ==
The character Dashamoolam Damu played by Suraj Venjaramoodu has achieved a cult status and a huge fan following over the years, being one of Suraj's most well known roles. He has been subjected to a lot of memes since then and is among the one the most memorable and most favorite characters among Malayali movie.

== Spin Off ==
In 2019, the director of the movie announced he will make a spin off of the movie featuring Dashamoolam Damu as the main character. In an interview with Times Of India, director Shafi stated that trollers and netizens used to continuously bug him for a film that featured Dashamoolam Damu as the main character.
