= Nivedyam (2007 film) =

2007 A. K. Lohithadas film

- VCD cover
- Directed by: A. K. Lohithadas
- Written by: A. K. Lohithadas
- Produced by: Omar Sharif
- Starring: Vinu Mohan; Bhama; Nedumudi Venu; Bharat Gopy
- Cinematography: Sajan Kalathil
- Edited by: Raja Mohammad
- Music by: M. Jayachandran (Songs); Ouseppachan (Score)
- Production company: Touchwood Creations
- Distributed by: Lal Releases
- Release date: 11 September 2007 (India)
- Running time: 127 minutes
- Country: India
- Language: Malayalam

Nivedyam is a 2007 Malayalam language romantic drama movie written and directed by A. K. Lohithadas, starring Vinu Mohan and Bhama in important roles. Nivedyam marks the film debut of Vinu Mohan and Bhama. It was the last movie written and directed by Lohithadas.

== Plot ==
Mohanakrishnan and his friends were working as carpenters. They create disturbance for the music composition happening in the neighborhood and they get arrested on the complaint of the lyricist, Kaithapram Damodaran Namboothiri. His guru Gopalan begs Kaithapram for forgiveness and gets them released. Kaithapram sends Mohanakrishnan to Ravamavarma Thampuran for a better job and for learning Carnatic music. There he meets Sathyabhama, an 18 year-old (adult) school girl who makes her living by making and selling pappadam. He falls in love with her at the first sight. Ramavarma appoints him as the Keezhshanti (sub priest) of the temple there as the Shanti (chief priest), Ramappan was ill and couldn't manage everything alone. His charismatic personality attracts the women of the locality to the temple, thereby increasing the collection of the temple. The next day he starts learning Carnatic music under Ravamavarma Thampuran.

One night, Mohanakrishnan who resides inside the temple hears some sounds but ignores it. The next day he finds a candy wrapper in front of the deity, Lord Krishna's idol. After a few days, Sathyabhama enters the temple at night and offers the candy and prays. Her relatives come to the temple in search of her, but she hides inside the Sreekovil. Her relatives leave from there. She opens up to Mohanakrishnan that whenever her evil cousin Surendran, a lorry driver comes to her house, she resides in the temple as he had once tried to molest her. He allows her to reside there for that night. The next day, he informs her that he would lock the way through which she enters the temple. He confesses everything to Ravamavarma who then suggests not to lock the way as she doesn't have any other choice. He also says that she is like his own daughter and offers an amount to Mohanakrishnan who then leaves to his hometown with that money.

He returns after two days. That night both of them open up about their love inside the temple. She starts visiting the temple daily at night and leaves early morning. One morning, a crowd of people find that both resided in the temple the previous night. When they come out, Ramappan out of his fury, beats him and breaks his Poonool. The crowd beats them up and the police arrest them on Ramavarma's order in order to protect them from the public. From there they go to his house. Surendran comes to his house and goes back with Mohanakrishnan's sister. Mohanakrishnan goes and exchanges Bhama for his sister. Surendran takes Bhama with him and on the way Mohanakrishnan tries to save her. Surendran beats up Mohanakrishnan badly and he falls in front of a god idol carved in stone. But when he sees Bhama being dragged away, he fights back and defeats Surendran. Mohanakrishnan and Bhama goes hides in the temple. Surendran enters the temple with a sword to kill them, but he gets stuck in temple entrance and Mohanakrishnan kills Surendran. The next day, the crowd and police arrives and Mohanakrishnan gets arrested. He assures Bhama that he would return to her after the confinement.

== Cast ==
- Vinu Mohan as C. K. Mohanakrishnan
- Bhama as Sathyabhama
- Nedumudi Venu as Ramappan Namboothiri, the chief priest of the temple
- Bharat Gopy as Ramavarma Thamburan
- Aparna Nair as Hemalatha, Ramavarma's daughter
- M. B. Padmakumar as Surendran, Sathyabhama's cousin and the main antagonist
- Ottapalam Pappan as Gopalan, as Mohanakrishnan's guru
- Kochu Preman as Nakulan, Sathyabhama's uncle
- Santakumari as Amminiamma, Temple staff
- Sreehari as Shekaran Nair
- Sreedevi Unni as Mohanakrishnan's mother
- Lakshmi Priya as Radha
- Kalamandalam Radhika as Ramavarma's sister
- Binju Ganga Babu as Anu (Mute Girl)
- Kaithapram Damodaran Namboothiri as himself
- M. Jayachandran as himself
- Sibi Malayil as himself

== Production ==
The film was mostly shot in Palakkad. Olappamanna Mana in Vellinezhi and some parts of Kavasseri and Alathur were the prominent shooting location. The art director Prashant Madhav made a set of a hundred year old temple for the film at Kavasseri. Most scenes of the movie were shot inside that temple.

== Soundtrack ==
M. Jayachandran composed the songs for the movie and Ouseppachan handled the background scores. The song "Kolakkuzha Vili Keetto" from the movie had a great fan following and is considered to be one of the best melodies ever composed by M. Jayachandran. Vijay Yesudas and Shweta Mohan received their first Kerala State Film Awards for rendering this song. The complete track of the film is as given.

No.	Title	Singer(s)	Lyricist	Duration
1	"Kolakkuzhal Vili Keetto"	Vijay Yesudas; Shweta Mohan	A. K. Lohithadas	4:32
2	"Chittattinkaavil"	M. K. Sankaran Namboothiri	Bichu Thirumala	4:24
3	"Kayampoovo"	Sudeep Kumar; K. S. Chitra	Kaithapram Damodaran Namboothiri	4:15
4	"Krishna Nee"	Sudha Ranjith	Traditional Song	2:58
5	"Thamthakitta Theyyare"	Vijay Yesudas; Pradeep Palluruthy	C. J. Kuttappan	4:18
6	"Hey Krishna"	M. Jayachandran	Kaithapram Damodaran Namboothiri	4:12
7	"Alaippayuthe"	Shweta Mohan; K. Krishnakumar	Traditional Song	3:32
8	"Lalithalavonga"	Sudeep Kumar; Shweta Mohan; K. S. Chitra; M. Jayachandran	Traditional Song	2:21

== Reception ==
The film received mixed responses from the audience as well as from the critics. M. Jayachandran's music and the performance of Bharat Gopy and Nedumudi Venu in the movie was acclaimed by all. Unni Nair praised the performance of Vinu Mohan, Bharat Gopy and Nedumudi Venu and said that, "the cinematography and music has come out really well but the film doesn't have a good story line and tests our patience in the second half."

== Accolades ==
Award	Category	Recipient	Ref.
Kerala State Film Awards	Best Music Director	M. Jayachandran	
Kerala State Film Awards	Best Male Playback Singer	Vijay Yesudas	
Kerala State Film Awards	Best Female Playback Singer	Shweta Mohan	
Kerala Film Critics Association Awards	Best Music Director	M. Jayachandran	
Kerala Film Critics Association Awards	Best Male Playback Singer	Vijay Yesudas	
Kerala Film Critics Association Awards	Best Female Playback Singer	Shweta Mohan	
Kerala Film Critics Association Awards	Best Debutant Actress	Bhama	
Asianet Film Awards	Best Star Pair	Vinu Mohan and Bhama	
Asianet Film Awards	Best Music Director	M. Jayachandran	
Vanitha Film Awards	Best Music Director	M. Jayachandran	
Vanitha Film Awards	Best Female Playback Singer	Shweta Mohan	
Vanitha Film Awards	Best Debutant Actress	Bhama	

== Remake ==
In 2010, Omar Sherif the producer of the movie announced the Kannada remake of Nivedyam. Even Surabhi Santosh was chosen as the lead actress, however the project didn't turn on due to some reasons.
