= Lakshmi Priya =

Indian actress and politician

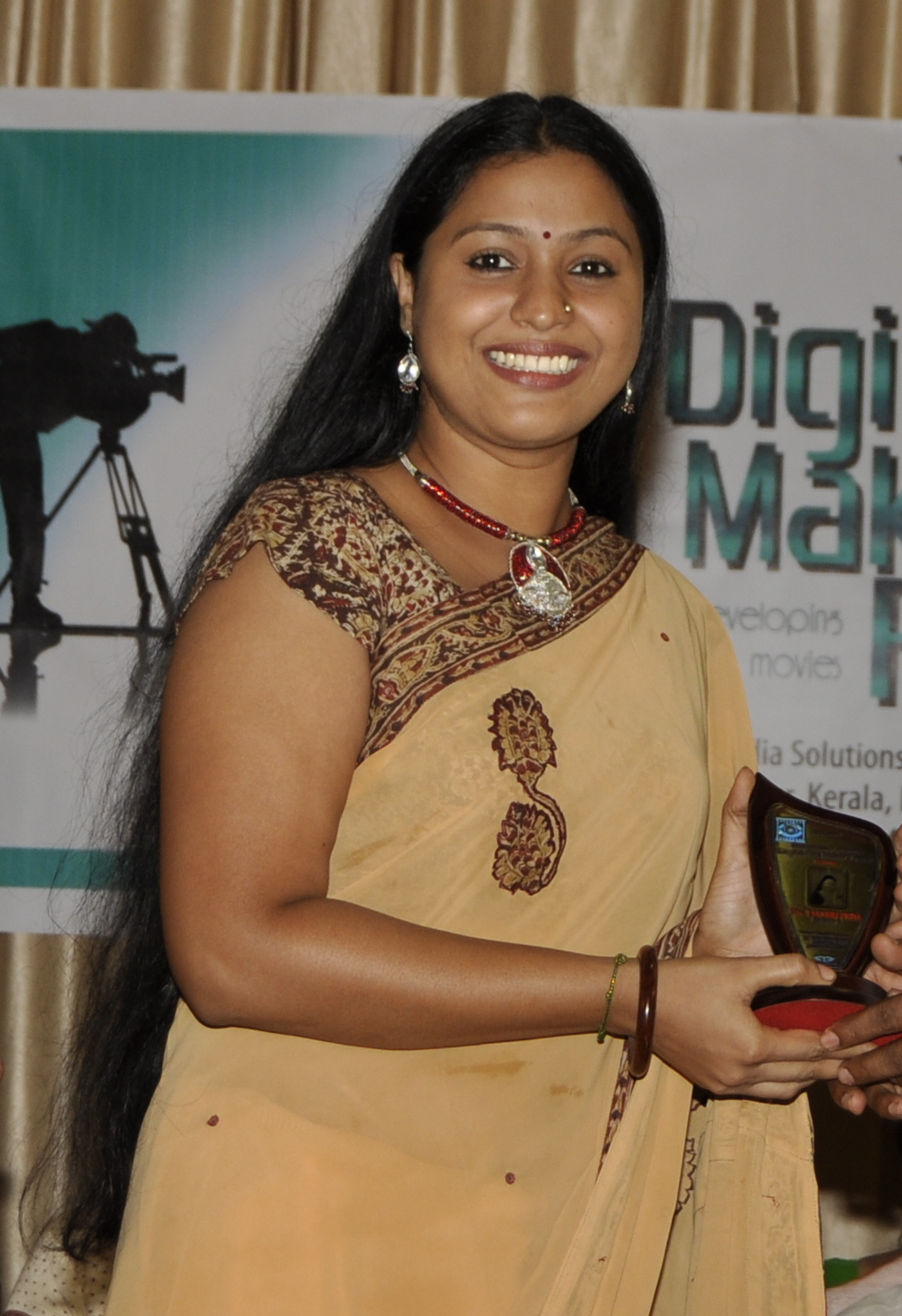
- Lakshmi Priya at award event of Jalachhayam in 2011
- Born: Sabeena Abdul Latheef; 11 March 1985 (age 41); Kayamkulam, Alappuzha district, Kerala, India
- Occupations: Actress; Politician
- Years active: 2005–present
- Political party: Twenty 20 Party
- Spouse: P. Jayesh (m. 2005)
- Children: 1
- Relatives: Pattanakkad Purushothaman (father-in-law)

Lakshmi Priya (née Sabeena Abdul Latheef; born 11 March 1985) is an Indian actress and politician who appears in Malayalam films. She is also known for her participation in Bigg Boss Malayalam Season 4.

Lakshmi Priya was elected as Vice President of Association of Malayalam Movie Artists (AMMA) in 2025 and resigned in 2026.

== Early life ==
She was born on 11 March 1985 to Kabir, who was from Haripad, and Ramlath, in a Muslim family. She has two sisters. Her parents divorced when she was two-and-a-half years old. Since then, she was raised by her paternal uncle Latheef, who was her guardian. Born in Kayamkulam, she was brought up in Nooranad, where she lived with her grandmother, paternal uncle and aunt in her father's ancestral home. Lakshmi Priya was estranged from her parents. She first met her father at age five, until age 14, she believed that her mother died while she was still alive. Lakshmi Priya had her school education from St. Mary's LPS in Charummoodu, CBMHS Nooranad, and PUM Vocational Higher Secondary School in Pallickal. She did not complete her higher secondary education. At age 16, she began acting in professional plays. She is also a dancer and has won the Kalathilakam title.

== Acting career ==
She has done a lot of supporting roles in Malayalam film industry.

== Political career ==
Lakshmi Priya has been an outspoken supporter of the Bharatiya Janata Party (BJP) and the Rashtriya Swayamsevak Sangh (RSS)-affiliated Sangh Parivar. She has stated that her association with the ideology dates back to her school days, when she contested an election as a candidate of the Akhil Bharatiya Vidyarthi Parishad (ABVP). Following the BJP losing its sole assembly seat in the 2021 Kerala Legislative Assembly election, she publicly reaffirmed that she would remain a "Sanghputri" ("daughter of the Sangh") and continue voting for the BJP regardless of its electoral fortunes, describing her political beliefs as rooted in the ideology rather than electoral success.

In 2026, Lakshmi Priya formally entered electoral politics by joining Twenty20 Party, an ally of NDA (led by Bharathiya Janata Party) and was initially announced as a candidate for the Kerala Legislative Assembly election from the Perumbavoor Assembly constituency. However, her candidature was later withdrawn after her name was found missing from the voter list, and she was replaced by Jibi Pathikkal.

== Personal life ==
She is married to P. Jayesh, son of musician Pattanakkad Purushothaman, on 20 April 2005. Since then, she is a practicing Hindu. They have a daughter named Mathangi Jai. They reside in Kakkanad. In 2019, she wrote a book titled Kadhayum Kadhapathrangalum Sangalpikamalla (transl. Story and characters are not fictional), which can be called as an autobiography or a memoir.

== Filmography ==
Year	Title	Role	Notes
2005	Naran	Pushpa	
2005	Thanmathra	Rameshan Nair's co-staff	
2006	Chakkara Muthu	Raji	
2006	Lion	Shobha	
2007	Athisayan	Shahidha	
2007	Flash	Dhwani's kin	
2007	Nivedyam	Radha	
2008	Malabar Wedding	Sadu's wife	
2008	Madampi	Santha	
2008	Annan Thambi	Drama artist, Sulochana	
2008	One Way Ticket	Zeenath	
2008	Lollipop	Rachel	
2009	Evidam Swargamanu	Deenamma	
2009	Boomi Malayalam	Nirmala's sister-in-law	
2009	Kadha, Samvidhanam Kunchakko	Mrs. Mathew	
2009	Utharaswayamvaram	Mrs. Devan	
2009	Oru Black & White Kudumbam	Leela	
2009	Bhagyadevatha	Sofia	
2009	Chemistry	Jennifer	
2010	Pramani	Somesekharan's sister	
2010	Fiddle	Irshad's love interest	
2010	Chekavar	Indhu	
2010	Oru Small Family	Mohini	
2010	Veettilekkulla Vazhi	Rashida	
2010	Thanthonni	Alice	
2010	Sadgamaya	Sindu Jayamohan	
2010	Kadha Thudarunnu	Mallika	
2011	Aazhakadal	Indira	
2011	Living Together	Manikantan's wife	
2011	Pachuvum Kovalanum	Servant	
2011	Seniors	Damayanthi teacher	
2011	Mohabbath	Raseena	
2012	Perinoru Makan	Deepa Sahadevan	
2012	Last Bench	Biology teacher	
2012	Mr. Marumakan	Mrs. Panicer	
2012	Kaashh		
2012	Bhoopadathil Illatha Oridam		
2012	Banking Hours 10 to 4	Lakshmi	
2012	Molly Aunty Rocks!	Usha	
2012	Father's Day	Fatima	
2012	Grihanathan	Annamma	
2012	Thappana	Sunanda	
2013	Blackberry	Leena	
2013	Kallante Makan	Sugandhi teacher	
2013	Nadan		
2013	Isaac Newton S/O Philipose	Rosie	
2013	Careebeyans	Aleena	
2013	Buddy	Shakunthala	
2013	Housefull	Mumthaz	
2013	Maad Dad	Omana	
2013	God for Sale	Thankamani	
2013	Ginger	Geetha	
2013	Kunjananthante Kada	Vijayalakshmi	
2014	Tharangal	Member Kamalam	
2014	Ring Master	Advocate	
2014	Lal Bahadur Shastri	Agricultural officer	
2014	Avatharam	Karimban John's sister	
2014	God's Own Country	Pushpa	
2014	7th Day	Lab Technician	
2014	Alice: A True Story	Seethammai	
2014	Ulsaha Committee	Chandrika	
2014	Asha Black	Musician	
2015	Wonderful Journey		
2015	Village Guys	Lissy	
2015	Ithinumappuram	Devu	
2015	Campus Diary		
2015	Urumbukal Urangarilla	Anitha	
2016	Kolamass	Balloon vendor's daughter	
2016	Poyi Maranju Parayathe		
2016	Appuram Bengal Ippuram Thiruvithamkoor	Lizy	
2017	Swayam	Agnez	
2017	Adventures of Omanakuttan		
2017	Tiyaan	Kowsalya	
2018	Aami	Sudhakaran's wife	
2018	Ennaalum Sarath..?	Lady Police officer	
2019	Margamkali	Poothiri Lilly	
2019	Marconi Mathai	Laly	

== TV serials ==
- All television series are in Malayalam language

Year	Title	Channel
2005	Sthreedhanam	Jeevan TV
2005	Ayyadi Maname	Kairali TV
2005	Krishnakripasagaram	Amrita TV
2005 - 2006	Indumukhi Chandramathi	Surya TV
2006	Kanakkinavu	Surya TV
2007	Nombarappoovu	Asianet
2009	Aranazhikaneram	Amrita TV
2010	Devi Mahatmyam	Asianet
2012	Abhinethri	Surya TV
2014	Sreemathikkoru Sreeman	ACV
2015 - 2016	Nirupama Fans	Flowers TV
2016	Aluvayum Mathikariyum	Asianet Plus
2018	Seetha	Flowers TV
2020	Pulival	Flowers TV
2021 - 2022	Palunku	Asianet

== Television shows ==
- All television shows are in Malayalam language

Year	Program	Role	TV Channel	Notes
2023	Cook with Comedy	Contestant	Asianet	
2022	Onaruchimelam Season 6	Presenter	Asianet	
2022	Comedy Stars Season 3	Mentor/Guest	Asianet	Reality show
2022	Start Music Aaradhyam Padum Season 4	Participant	Asianet	Game show
2022	Fastest Family First	Participant	Asianet	Game show
2022	Bigg Boss (Malayalam season 4)	Contestant	Asianet	3rd Runner-Up
2022	Red Carpet	Mentor	Amrita TV	Reality show
2022	Parayam Nedam	Participant	Amrita TV	Game show
2021	Aram + Aram = Kinnaram	Contestant	Surya TV	
2019–2021	Star Magic	Participant	Flowers TV	Game show
2017–2019	Tamar Padar	Participant	Flowers TV	Game show
2017	Onaruchimelam Season 2	Presenter	Asianet	
2016	Laughing Villa		Surya TV	
	Varthaprabhatham		Asianet News	
2013	Coat Eeswaran		Surya TV	
	Badai Bungalow	Ammayi	Asianet	
	Nammal Thammil	Panelist	Asianet	
	Comedy Express	Judge	Asianet	
	Comedy Stars	Judge	Asianet	
	Kudumbasametham			
	Celebrity Choice		Asianet	
2012	Amma Ammayiyamma	Anchor	Kairali TV	
2014	Manassiloru Mazhavillu		Kairali TV	
	Onnum Onnum Moonu		Mazhavil Manorama	
	Ivide Ingannanu Bhai		Mazhavil Manorama	
	Super Kids	Anchor	Kairali TV	
	Vanitharatnam		Amrita TV	
	Onasparsham			
	Sreekandan Nair Show	Panelist	Surya TV	
	Yuvatharam			
	Hit Vit			
	Malayali Darbar	Panelist	Amrita TV	
	Smart Show	Participant	Flowers TV	
	Star Ragging		Kairali TV	
	Annies Kitchen		Amrita TV	
	Vanitha		Mazhavil Manorama	
	I Personally		Kappa TV	
	Chayakottu		DD Malayalam	
	Taste Time	Presenter	Asianet	
	Little Cheff	Presenter	Kairali TV	
	Ente Priya Ganangal	Presenter	Surya TV	
	Chef Master	Presenter	Kaumudy TV	
2016	Chef Master Junior	Mentor	Kaumudy TV	
2017	Dream Drive		Kaumudy TV	
	Surya Challenge	Participant	Surya TV	
	Punyavazhiyiloode	Presenter	Kaumudy TV	
2017	Payasamela	Presenter	Kaumudy TV	
	Njannanu Sthree		Asianet	
	Veettamma	Presenter	DD Malayalam	
	Cinema Company		Kaumudy TV	

== Controversies ==
In 2026, actress and former Association of Malayalam Movie Artists (AMMA) joint secretary Ansiba Hassan accused Lakshmi Priya, her husband Jayesh and a woman police officer of conspiring against her by filing a false complaint that allegedly resulted in her unlawful detention and harassment at the Thrippunithura Women's Police Station. Ansiba approached the Thrippunithura Magistrate Court seeking the registration of a First Information Report (FIR) after the police declined to register a case.

The dispute originated over the acceptance of donations from the Vennala Mahadeva Temple for AMMA's 'Sanjeevani' medical assistance scheme. According to Lakshmi Priya, Ansiba objected to accepting funds from a religious institution and subsequently made allegations against her and other office-bearers of the association.

Lakshmi Priya denied Ansiba's allegations, describing them as baseless and politically motivated, and announced that she would file a defamation suit seeking ₹10 crore in damages against Ansiba Hassan.

In next few weeks, she became involved in a series of disputes within the Association of Malayalam Movie Artists (AMMA), where she served as vice-president. During internal disagreements over the association's financial reports and governance, she alleged that members of the then leadership were being "targeted" and defended the committee against accusations of corruption and lack of transparency.

Following the resignation of AMMA president Shweta Menon, Lakshmi Priya also resigned from the organisation's primary membership.
