= Narayanankutty =

Indian actor and comedian

Kalabhavan Narayanan Kutty
- Other names: Narayankutty; Ernakulam Narayankutty
- Occupation: Film actor
- Years active: 1986–present

Narayanan Kutty or Kalabhavan Narayanankutty is a Malayalam film actor. He has acted in more than 300 films. He handles mainly comedy roles.

== Background ==
Narayanan Kutty was born in Ernakulam. He started his career as a mimicry artist in Kalabhavan, Kochi. His debut movie is Onnu Muthal Poojyam Vare in 1986. He was an active participant of Malayalee House season 1 and evicted in 5th week. He is married and has a daughter.

== Filmography ==
Year	Title	Role	Notes
1986	Onnu Muthal Poojyam Vare		
1990	Nanma Niranjavan Sreenivasan		
1991	Ulladakkam		
1992	Kizhakkan Pathrose		
1994	Moonnaam Loka Pattaalam	Kochappi	
1994	Chukkan	Tailor	
1994	Manathe Kottaram	Map seller	
1994	CID Unnikrishnan B.A., B.Ed.	Tailor	
1995	Mimics Action 500	Narayanankutty	
1995	Kakkakum Poochakkum Kalyanam	Beggar	
1996	Vanarasena	Romeo Bhaskaran	
1996	Sulthan Hyderali	Paramu	
1996	Kavaadam		
1996	Kireedamillaatha Raajakkanmaar	Thekkan Pathrose	
1996	Mimics Super 1000		
1996	Mookkilla Raajyathu Murimookkan Raajaavu		
1997	Lelam	Sadasivan	
1997	Ranger		
1997	Kudamattam		
1998	Sooryavanam	Neelambharan	
1999	Vazhunnor	Yousuf	
2000	Thenkasipattanam	Music troop manager	
2001	Dupe Dupe Dupe		
2001	Ee Parakkum Thalika	Police Inspector	
2001	Korappan The Great		
2002	Mazhathullikkilukkam		
2002	Kalyanaraman	Suku	
2002	Kaiyethum Doorath	Boat passenger	
2002	Aala		
2002	Ee Bhaargaveenilayam		
2003	Chithrakoodam		
2003	CID Moosa	Police Constable	
2004	Kerala House Udan Vilpanakku	Snake charmer	
2004	Vellinakshatram		
2004	Rasikan	Annachi	
2005	Chirattakkalippaattangal		
2005	Junior Senior	Sundaran	
2005	OK Chacko Cochin Mumbai		
2005	Nerariyan CBI	Villager	
2005	Finger Print	Kunjikuttan Thampuran	
2006	Nottam		
2006	Chacko Randaaman		
2006	Highway Police	Kochuvanam Velu	
2006	Karutha Pakshikal	Schoolmaster	
2006	Pothan Vava		
2006	Bada Dosth		
2006	Baba Kalyani	Police Constable	
2007	Athisayan		
2007	Avan Chandiyude Makan	Prahaladan	
2007	Mayavi	Sasi	
2007	Nagaram	Monayi	
2007	Abraham & Lincoln		
2007	Hareendran Oru Nishkalankan	Hareendran's servant	
2008	Lollipop	Ambrose	
2008	Crazy Gopalan		
2009	Love In Singapore		
2009	Meghatheertham		
2009	Pramukhan	Sethumadhavan Pillai	
2009	Colours	Police Officer	
2009	My Big Father	Marriage Broker	
2009	Oru Black and White Kudumbam		
2009	Kappal Muthalaali		
2009	2 Harihar Nagar	Rajappan	
2009	Paribhavam		
2009	Utharaswayamvaram		
2009	Thathwamasi		
2010	Oridathoru Postman		
2010	Kadaksham	Drama Artist	
2010	Again Kasargod Khader Bhai		
2010	Koottukar	Abookka	
2010	Paappi Appacha	Nicholas	
2010	Valiyangadi	Lazer	
2010	Advocate Lakshmanan – Ladies Only		
2010	Raama Raavanan		
2010	Karayilekku Oru Kadal Dooram	Postman	
2010	Thaskara Lahala		
2011	Sarkar Colony		
2011	Doubles	Mukuntan	
2011	Manikiakkallu	Eldhose	
2011	Uppukandam Brothers Back in Action	Soman	
2011	Seniors		
2011	Maharaja Talkies		
2011	Kudumbasree Travels	Kanaran	
2011	Snehaadaram		
2011	Pachuvum Kovalanum	Boniface	
2011	The Filmstaar		
2011	Ulakam Chuttum Valiban	Vinayaka Panicker	
2012	Ordinary	KSRTC staff	
2012	Friday		
2012	Cinema Company	Autodriver	
2012	Yaadhaarthyam		
2012	Doctor Innocent aanu		
2012	Kunjaliyan	Shashankan	
2012	Kaashh		
2012	Chettayees		
2013	Radio	S.I.	
2013	Tourist Home	Shivankutty	
2013	Police Maman	Police Inspector	
2013	3 Dots		
2013	Rebecca Uthup Kizhakkemala		
2013	Vallatha Pahayan		
2013	Kadal Kadannu Oru Maathukutty	Ashokan	
2013	Mr. Bean		
2013	For Sale	Shaji	
2013	Hotel California	Police Officer	
2013	Nadodimannan		
2014	Salala Mobiles	Constable Ramachandran	
2014	Ring Master	Doctor	
2016	Oru Murai Vanthu Parthaya	Kunjammavan	
2018	Kalyanam	Ramanan	
2018	Oru Pazhaya Bomb Kadha		
2021	Kaalchilambu		
2021	Pappantem Simontem Piller		
2021	Who Is Right		Short film
2022	Sudokku'N		
2022	Karnan Napoleon Bhagath Singh		
2023	Within Seconds	Mammath	
2023	Cheena Trophy		
