= Shobha Mohan =

Indian actress

- Born: 1955 (age 70–71); Kottarakkara, Kollam, Indian
- Occupation: Actress
- Years active: 1965 (as a child artist); 1982 (as a heroine); 2001–present
- Spouse: K. Mohankumar (m. 1984)
- Children: Vinu Mohan; Anu Mohan
- Father: Kottarakara Sreedharan Nair
- Relatives: Sai Kumar (brother)

Shobha Mohan is an Indian actress who has predominantly worked in Malayalam cinema.

== Biography ==
Shobha Mohan was born to actor Kottarakara Sreedharan Nair and Vijayalakshmi at Kottarakkara in Kollam, Kerala. She is the elder sister of Malayalam actor Sai Kumar. She made her debut in Balloon in 1982 as the heroine opposite Mukesh. She married Malayalam Theatre artiste K. Mohankumar on 5 November 1984. Actors Vinu Mohan and Anu Mohan are their sons. Actress Vidhya Mohan is her daughter-in-law.

== Filmography ==
- All films in Malayalam unless otherwise indicated

List of Shobha Mohan film credits
Year	Title	Role	Notes
1965	Thommante Makkal	Young Chinnamma	Child artist
1982	Balloon	Sumam	
2001	Saivar Thirumeni	Subhadra	
2001	Gift of God		
2002	Chathurangam	Alice	
2002	Malayali Mamanu Vanakkam	Anandavalli	
2002	Nakshathrakkannulla Rajakumaran Avanundoru Rajakumari	Janaki	
2002	Gounder Veetu Maapillai	Anandavalli	Tamil film
2003	Gowrisankaram	Gowri's mother	
2003	Margam	Elizabeth	
2003	Mizhi Randilum	Devi	
2004	Koottu	Harikrishnan's mother	
2004	Vellinakshatram	Aswathi's mother	
2004	Malsaram	Susie's mother	
2004	Nerkku Nere	Malathy	
2005	Chanthupottu	Santhamma	
2005	Junior Senior	Kichu's mother	
2005	Kanne Madanguka	Visalakshi	
2005	Nerariyan CBI	Mythili's mother	
2005	Otta Nanayam	Chippy's mother	
2005	Rappakal	Janardana Varma's wife (Ambika)	
2006	Classmates	akshmi	
2006	Ennittum	Vani	
2006	Vargam	Nadia's mother	
2006	Lion	Lakshmi	
2006	The Don	Unnikrishnan's mother	
2007	Avan Chandiyude Makan	Vasudha	
2007	Eakantham	Mother Superior	
2007	Payum Puli	Ravishankar's mother	
2007	Sketch	Shivahari's mother	
2007	Hareendran Oru Nishkalankan		
2007	Janmam		
2007	Anamika	Nun	
2007	Satham Podathey	Latha	Tamil film
2008	Gopalapuranam	Yashodha	
2008	Cycle	Roy's mother	
2008	Parthan Kanda Paralokam	Parthan's mother	
2008	SMS	Indu's mother	
2008	Mayabazar	Lakshmi Narayanan's mother	
2008	Twenty:20		
2009	Bhramaram	Ambili's mother	
2009	Chattambinadu	Menon's wife	
2009	Dalamarmarangal	Parvathy	
2009	Ividam Swargamaanu	Betsy's mother	
2009	Puthiya Mukham	Krishna Kumar's mother	
2009	Robin Hood	Krishna Veni	
2009	Utharaswayamvaram	Sharadha	
2009	Pramukhan		
2009	Sanmanassullavan Appukuttan	Lakshmikuttiyamma	
2010	Patham Adhyayam	Meenakshi	
2010	Plus Two	Saraswathi Amma	
2010	Yugapurushan	Antharjanam	
2010	Paappi Appacha	Annie's mother	
2011	Christian Brothers	Sudhakaran's wife	
2011	Rathinirvedam	Pappu's mother	
2011	Tejabhai and Family	Roshan's mother	
2011	Ulakam Chuttum Valiban	Madhaviyamma	
2011	101 Uruppika	-	
2011	Track	Zacharia's wife	
2011	Umma	Umma	
2011	Ithu Nammude Katha	Vinod's mother	
2012	Ee Thirakkinidayil	Ananthan's mother	
2012	Hero	Sarojini	
2012	Mazhavillinattam Vare	–	
2012	Navagatharkku Swagatham	Prasanth's mother	
2012	Aakasmikam	Anitha's mother	
2012	Naadabrahmam	Gayathri	
2013	Abhiyum Njanum	Sohan's mother	
2013	Drishyam	Rani's mother	
2013	Nadodimannan	Padmanabhan's mother	
2013	Radio	Jayan's mother	
2013	Players (film)	Siddarth's mother	
2014	7th Day	Vinu's mother	
2014	Konthayum Poonoolum	Mary	
2014	Om Shanti Oshana	Sumithra (Giri's mother)	
2014	Pakida	Aadhi's mother	
2014	Day Night	Arjun's mother	
2014	My Dear Mummy	Rahul's mother	
2015	Picket 43	Hari's mother	
2015	Two Countries	Ullas's mother	
2015	White Boys	Dattan's mother	
2015	Sarathi	Deepu's mother	
2016	Hallelooya	Dr. Sudha Menon	
2016	Kidaari	Kombaiah's wife	Tamil film
2017	Crossroad	Aimy's mother-in-law	Segment:"Lake house"
2017	Punyalan Private Limited	Geetha	
2017	Sathya		
2018	Johny Johny Yes Appa	Sister Annie James	
2018	Kala Viplavam Pranayam	Greeshma's mother	
2018	Amma Karayaruthu	Old mother	
2018	Njan Marykutty	Marykutty's mother	
2019	An International Local Story	Vilasini	
2019	Kodathi Samaksham Balan Vakeel	Vidhyadharan's mother	
2019	Subharathri	Jameela	
2019	Ormma	Jayakrishnan's mother	
2019	Vallikettu	Saudamini	
2020	Velikku Veluppankalam	Mom	
2020	Bhagyavarsham	Ammachi	
2021	Muddy	Indira	
2021	Michael's Coffee House	Fidha's mother	
2021	Aarkkariyam	Sr. Alphonsa	
2021	Drishyam 2	Rani's mother	
2021	Eval Gopika	Aswathi Thampuratti	
2022	Ente Mazha	Unni's grandmother	
2022	Vaashi	Court Judge	
2023	Granny	Granny	
2023	2018	Rameshan's mother	
2023	A Ranjith Cinema	Herself	
2024	Aadujeevitham	Najeeb's mother	
2026	Drishyam 3	Rani's mother	

== TV serials ==
List of Shobha Mohan television serials credits
Year	Serial	Channel	Notes
2002	Manasaputhri	Surya TV	
2003	Valayam	DD Malayalam	
2003	Thyagaraja Swamikal	DD Malayalam	
2003	Megham	Asianet	
2003	Ramettan	DD Malayalam	
2004–2006	Kavyanjali	Surya TV	
2007	Thulabharam	Surya TV	
2007	Choodu	Doordarshan	
2007	Velankanni Mathavu	Surya TV	
2007	Chandrodayam	Doordarshan	
	Orikkal Koodi		
2009	Madakkayathra	Amrita TV	Television film
2009–2010	Mazhayariyathe	Surya TV	
2010	Indhraneelam	Surya TV	
2010	Snehatheeram	Surya TV	
2011	Chila Nerangalil Chilar Manushyar	Amrita TV	
2015	Snehasangamam	Surya TV	
2015	Sangamam	Surya TV	
2015–2016	Sivakami	Surya TV	
2016	Amme Mahamaye	Surya TV	
2016	Parassini Shri Muthappan	Jaihind TV	
2016–2017	Karuthamuthu	Asianet	
2018	Parasparam	Asianet	
2018	Makkal	Mazhavil Manorama	
2018–2019	Swathi Nakshatram Chothi	Zee Keralam	
2020	Namukku Paarkkuvan Munthirithoppukal	Surya TV	
2020–2021	Ente Maathavu	Surya TV	
2021–2023	Neeyum Njanum	Zee Keralam	Replaced Manka Mahesh
2022	Daya	Asianet	
2023–2024	Mayamayooram	Zee Keralam	Replaced by Geetha Nair
2023-2024	Amme Bhagavathy	Flowers TV	
2024	Panchagni	Flowers TV	
2024	Santhwanam 2	Asianet	
2025	Mazhathorum Munpe	Asianet	
2025–2026	Manathe Kottaram	Zee Keralam	Replaced Sajitha Madathil
