= Ee Thirakkinidayil =

- Directed by: Anil Kaarakkulam
- Screenplay by: P. R. Ajith Kumar
- Story by: P. R. Ajith Kumar
- Produced by: Shaju Thomas
- Starring: Vinu Mohan; Muktha
- Cinematography: Anpumani
- Music by: Raveendran R. N.
- Production company: Aalukkal Films
- Release date: 17 February 2012
- Country: India
- Language: Malayalam

Ee Thirakkinidayil is a 2012 Malayalam film directed by Anil Kaarakkulam, starring Vinu Mohan and Muktha in the lead roles.

== Cast ==
- Vinu Mohan as Ananthan
- Muktha as Savithri
- Shaju
- Geetha Vijayan
- Vidya Harish siva
- Harish siva
- Shobha Mohan as Ananthan's mother
- Krishna
- Biju Kuttan
- Janardhanan
- K. P. A. C. Lalitha
- Kalabhavan Shajon as Sadananthasn Pattikadu
- Sreelatha Namboothiri as Eliyamma
- Lakshmi Sanal as Nurse
- Jyothi as Ananthan's sister
