= Ulakam Chuttum Valiban =

- Film poster
- Directed by: Raj Babu
- Screenplay by: Krishna Poojappura
- Story by: Gopu Babu
- Produced by: Jaleel; Basheer
- Starring: Jayaram; Biju Menon; Vandana Menon; Lena; Suraj Venjaramoodu
- Cinematography: Anandakuttan
- Edited by: V. T. Shreejith
- Music by: Songs: Mohan Sithara; Score: Ratheesh Vegha
- Production company: Galaxy Films
- Distributed by: Galaxy Film Release
- Release date: 9 September 2011
- Country: India
- Language: Malayalam

Ulakam Chuttum Valiban (Tranls. Globetrotting Youngster) is a 2011 Malayalam comedy film directed by Raj Babu produce by Milan Jaleel under his banner Galaxy Films. It stars Jayaram, Biju Menon, Vandana Menon, Lena and Suraj Venjaramoodu in the lead roles. The film got poor reviews and ended up as a flop.

== Plot ==
Jayashankar is a wholesale vegetable vendor who lives with his mother and only sister Kalyani. Jayashankar is in debt and goes to the city to meet his relative Sethumadhavan to borrow some money to straighten things out. There he finds out that his relative is not a successful businessman but rather, a successful thief. He recruits Jayashankar to thievery, and throughout the movie, everyone is confused whether Jayashankar is a thief or a Sub-inspector. Unexpectedly, TV channel Presenter Varsha and her brother CI Sajan Joseph enter the life of Jayashankar. Varsha wants Jayashanker to appear in her Street Reality show programme. Sajan Joseph, who is vain and enamored with his own personality and beauty. In the end, Sajan Joseph and Jayashankar join hands to bring down a corrupt politician Dathan, and care for his family.

== Cast ==
- Jayaram as SI Jayashankar
- Biju Menon as CI Sajan Joseph
- Suraj Venjaramoodu as Chengiri Sethumadhavan, Jayashankar's cousin
- Mithra Kurian as Kalyani, Jayashankar's sister
- Vandana Menon as Varsha, Sajan's sister
- Lena as Annie, Sajan's wife
- Salim Kumar as Benjamin D. Franklin (Trainer of the thieves)
- Bijukuttan as Thankachan
- Kottayam Nazeer as Jayashankar's friend
- Suresh Krishna as MLA Dhathan
- Abu Salim as SP Krishnakumar IPS
- Kalabhavan Shajon as ASI Manikanda dasan
- Priyanka Anoop as Civil Police Officer Shanty
- Pradeep Prabhakar as Civil Police Officer
- Mohan Ayeroor as Commissioner
- Narayanankutty as Vinayaka Panicker (Astrologist)
- Janardhanan as Jayashankar's uncle
- Lalu Alex as IG Hameed IPS
- Sajitha Betti as Dhathan's wife
- Shobha Mohan as Jayashankar's mother
- Ramesh Valiyashala as Party Member
- Sadiq
- Deepika Mohan
- Shalini
- Sanaljith Cholayil as Jayaram's childhood
