= Koottukar (2010 film) =

- Film poster
- Directed by: Prasad Valacheril
- Written by: Satheesh Babu Manchery
- Produced by: Annamma Poulose
- Starring: Vinu Mohan; Bhama
- Cinematography: Marimuthu
- Edited by: P. C. Mohanan
- Music by: S. P. Venkatesh; Sam Thomas
- Distributed by: Paulco Films
- Release date: 19 November 2010
- Country: India
- Language: Malayalam
- Budget: 1 cr
- Box office: 12 cr

Koottukar (Friends) is a 2010 Indian Malayalam-language action thriller film directed by Prasad Vaalacheril, starring Vinu Mohan and Bhama.

== Plot ==
Chandradas, an advocate receives a phone call during his birthday party regarding a business deal from Unnikrishnan, who then kills him when they meet. Commissioner Antony Alex, Unni's childhood friend, attempts to arrest him and his underworld ally Masthan Bhai, but Masthan's right-hand man Mahmmed shows up and saves them. Masthan tells Mahmmed not to kill Alex and promises to surrender once Unni has completed his revenge. Alex visits Father Varghese Chembanthotti, who tries to make contact with Unni through Masthan, but fails. Later, Unni visits his old house and reminisces his past.

Unni's father Krishnan, an honest taxi driver, wanted his son to be a police officer, and Unnikrishnan had passed his exams and was selected for IPS training. He was also in love with a woman named Achu, whom both families expected him to marry. But one day, Krishnan was attacked by a drunk man named Kannan. Unni fought the attacker off; however, Kannan's father Somasundaram, ordered a corrupt police officer Rajan to take Krishnan and Unni into custody and beat them. Rajan and his accomplice Narayanan tortured the pair, and in the process, Krishnan gets killed. Afterwards, Unni was falsely convicted of killing a police officer and sent to prison. In jail, Unni was attacked by another prisoner, but Masthan intervened and saved him. Masthan revealed that Somasundaram and Kannan had betrayed him to customs in a smuggling deal. That was the point at which Unnikrishnan and Masthan became friends and allies. Achu, at Unni's urging, went along with her parents' plans and married someone else. Unni's mother and sister gets raped by Rajan and Narayanan and in shame they commits suicide.

Back in the present, Unni kills those who have ruined his life one by one, with Masthan's and Mahmmed's help, but the mission to kill Kannan goes wrong. Kannan reveals that Masthan was his killer before he dies. Somasundaram stabs Masthan to death, and avenges Kannan's death. Unni then pays a last visit to Father Varghese and asks the priest to pray for him. Meanwhile, Somasundaram takes Mahmmed into custody and uses his confession to arrest Unni. In the final act, Aswathy prosecutes Unni, who is sentenced to death. After the verdict, Aswathy dies. While taking to the prison, Unni breaks from custody and attacks Somasundaram and while trying shoot Unni, Somasundaram gets accidentally killed by Alex. Unni dies in Father Varghese's arms with Alex by his side, being very mournful in killing his own friend.

== Cast ==
- Vinu Mohan as 'Don' Unnikrishnan
- Bhama as Advocate Aswathy
- Shankar as Masthan Bhai
- Anoop Chandran as Father Varghese Chembanthotti
- Saiju Kurup as ACP Antony Alex IPS
- Sreelatha Namboothiri
- Devan as Krishnan
- Urmila Unni as Devaki
- Ambika Mohan as Aswathy's mother
- Narayanankutty as Abookka
- Kalasala Babu as Advocate Chandradas
- Santhosh as CI Kozhi Rajan
- Kollam Ajith as DYSP Idiyan Narayanan
- Mamukkoya as Ikka

== Soundtrack ==
- "Chendumalli Thazhvarayil" – sung by Unnimenon and Sujatha, lyrics by Pulikkottil Hydarali, music by Sam Thomas
- "Inshah Allah" – sung by G. Venugopal, lyrics by Bichu Tirumala, music by S. P. Venkitesh
- "Unnikkurulukhal" – sung by M. G. Sreekumar, lyrics by Tirumala, music by Venkitesh
- "Madhuvoorum Ennazhakhe" – sung by Madhu Balakrishnan, lyrics by Vasu Areekkodu, music by Venkitesh
