= Cycle (2008 film) =

2008 Malayalam film by Johny Antony

- VCD cover
- Directed by: Johny Antony
- Written by: James Albert
- Produced by: Thilakan Thandasseri; Sunny Kuruvila; Viswanathan Nair
- Starring: Vinu Mohan; Vineeth Sreenivasan; Bhama; Sandhya; Jagathy Sreekumar
- Cinematography: Shaji Kumar
- Edited by: Ranjan Abraham
- Music by: Mejo Joseph
- Production company: Master's Cinema
- Distributed by: Lal Release
- Release date: 16 February 2008
- Running time: 150 minutes
- Country: India
- Language: Malayalam

Cycle is a 2008 Indian Malayalam film directed by Johny Antony and written by James Albert, starring Vinu Mohan, Vineeth Sreenivasan, Sandhya, Bhama, and Jagathy Sreekumar. The tale is about two friends, Roy (Vineeth Sreenivasan) and Sanju (Vinu Mohan), struggling to make both ends meet with their low salaries, working respectively as a cashier in a private finance company and as a salesman in an electronics goods shop. It was a box office success.

== Plot ==
The film, set at a shopping mall in Kochi as backdrop, is all about a few youngsters, Roy and Sanju and their love interests, Annie and Meenakshy. Long-ignored and mistreated by society for reasons none of theirs, they decide to take matters into their own hands. Roy is an accountant in a private financing company of Kaustubhan, (deftly played with ease and characteristic gags by Jagathy) who pays his staff, the modest of all salaries. Sanju is a desperate cricketer, left out of Ranji team, who is working in the same commercial mall in an electronics shop. Roy has a soft corner for Annie who works as a receptionist in a travel agency in the same complex. And Meenakshy, the daughter of Kaushtubhan, is madly in love, always chasing Sanju.

Sanju and Roy have plenty of household chaos due to poverty. An idyllic New Year eve celebration turns nightmarish when they are subjected to unimaginable terrors and struggle to save lives. Circumstances leave them with no alternatives other than to become robbers. After a thrilling getaway after stealing two crore rupees, this heist movie recounts what else the cycle of life holds for them. With tons of money at their disposal but with powerful elites on their search, they are forced to alter their plans following impending pressures.

== Cast ==
- Vineeth Sreenivasan as Roy
- Vinu Mohan as Sanju
- Bhama as Annie, Roy's love interest
- Sandhya as Meenakshi, Sanju's love interest
- Jagathy Sreekumar as Kausthubhan
- Sai Kumar as DYSP Surendran
- Cochin Haneefa as Krishnankutty, politician
- Murali as Simon, Annie's father
- Shankar as Jayashankar, cricket coach
- Sadiq as Bhargavan
- Dave Heidebrecht as New Years Dancer
- Eric Rochwerg as New Years Dancer
- Adam Rochwerg as New Years Dancer
- Salim Kumar as Stephen, Roy's uncle
- Shammi Thilakan as S.I. Kurian
- Kalabhavan Shajon as Raghu, Shoe seller
- Shobha Mohan as Roy's mother
- T. G. Ravi as Krishnan, Sanju's father
- Ambika Mohan as Sanju's neighbour
- Arun A Kumar as Annie's brother
- Dimple Rose as Meenakshi's friend
- Harish Siva

== Soundtrack ==
The film featured a successful soundtrack composed by Mejo Joseph and lyrics penned by Anil Panachooran. It featured 5 songs, out of which 3 were featured in the film.

1. "Kanapponnin" - Cicily Abraham, Vineeth Sreenivasan
2. "Milky Way" - Luke, Swapna
3. "Pattunarnnuvo" - K. S. Chithra, Srinivas
4. "Pattunarnnuvo" - K. S. Chithra,
5. "Puthiyoreenam" - Karthik, Vineeth Sreenivasan
6. "Varnapainkili" - Vineeth Sreenivasan

== Reception ==
=== Critical reception ===
Paresh C. Palicha of Rediff.com rated the film 3/5 stars and wrote, "Cycle may be a youth-oriented film, but it is not all saccharine-coated adventure of director Kamal's variety, but a somewhat dark film with a dash of humour."
