= Finger Print =

- Directed by: Satheesh Paul
- Written by: Siddique
- Story by: Satish Paul
- Produced by: Sabu Cherian
- Starring: Jayaram; Indrajith; Gopika
- Cinematography: Gunashekhar
- Edited by: Manoharan
- Music by: Pravin Mani
- Production company: Anandabhairavi
- Distributed by: Central Pictures
- Release date: 18 February 2005
- Country: India
- Language: Malayalam

Finger Print is a 2005 Indian Malayalam thriller film directed by Satheesh Paul and scripted by Siddique. The film is produced by Sabu Cherian under the banner Anandabhairavi. It stars Jayaram, Indrajith Renji V Nair and Gopika in lead roles. The film was released on 18 February 2005.

== Plot ==
A patriarch of a royal family whose descendant was murdered, assigns the task of finding the culprit to two of his police officer nephews - Vivek (Jayaram) and Kishore (Indrajith). The officers use their intelligence and expertise to track and find the culprit.

== Cast ==
- Jayaram as A.S.P Vivek Varma IPS
- Indrajith as A.S.P Kishore Shankar IPS
- Gopika as Preethi Varma
- Nedumudi Venu as Rama Varma Thampuran
- Sai Kumar as Prathapa Varma
- Unni Shivapal as Krishna Prasad
- Rajesh Subrahmanian as Devraj
- Ranjith Velayudhan as Capt. Nandakumar
- Kripa as Deepa Nair
- Joju George as C.I. Shekhar
- A. T. Jose as I.G
- Siraj Musthafa Khan as S.I Shereef
- Devan as Adv. Murali Mohan
- Murali Menon as Praveen Varma
- Narayanankutty as Kunjikuttan Thampuran
- Tom George Kolath as Medical Police Surgeon

== Reception ==
A critic from Sify wrote, "Finger Print fails to entertain and offers little in the way of surprise".
