= Sakudumbam Shyamala =

- Directed by: Radhakrishnan Mangalath
- Written by: Krishna Poojapura
- Produced by: S.Gopakumar
- Starring: Uravashi; Kunchako Boban; Nedumudi Venu; Sai Kumar; Suraj Venjaramoodu; Bhama
- Cinematography: Jibu Jacob
- Edited by: Manoj
- Music by: M. G. Sreekumar
- Distributed by: Kochuveettil Films
- Release date: 23 July 2010
- Country: India
- Language: Malayalam

Sakudumbam Shyamala is a 2010 Malayalam comedy film directed by Radhakrishnan Mangalath and written by Krishna Poojapura. The film has Uravashi, Kunchako Boban, Nedumudi Venu, Sai Kumar, Suraj Venjaramoodu, and Bhama in the main roles. The film become commercially flop at the box office.

== Plot ==
Shyamala was not very good at her studies and fails in her Pre-degree examination. Her family, especially her brother Sekharan loves her a lot. They arrange her marriage with an American guy, but he wants Shyamala to pass her Pre-Degree for the marriage to happen. Things become different when Shyamala falls in love with Vasudevan, a Malayalam tutor in the college and marries him. Her family abandons her. Now Shymala is the mother of a 25-year-old son Akash.

Shyamala's biggest dream is her 25-year-old son's marriage to the daughter of any rich American Malayali. Akash is a video editor for a channel, while Vasudevan is an employee in the Collectorate, while Shyamala's brother is the District Collector. She tries to win over her brother who is angry with her for her marriage to Vasudevan.

Once Shyamala gets beaten up by police while she was returning home from market. The political party that was organising the strike which resulted in it took this matter up and gave a lot of media coverage for it. Shyamala became the talk of the town and the party decides to take advantage of it by making her contest for the assembly elections. Shyamala wins comfortably and becomes the revenue minister. Many rich people come forward to get their daughters married to Akash. Shyamala's dreams shatter when Akash marries a girl of his choice, Nandana, a TV reporter. A battle begins at home between Shyamala and Nandana.

Meanwhile, Shayamala's personal assistant Prakashan takes bribe and gets Shyamala's signature in some documents which becomes a big scandal. Shayamala is forced to resign from her ministerial post. When she is announced to be arrested, Shekaran, putting aside his old feud with her, reconciles with Shyamala and hides her from the police temporarily. Thus, brother and sister are reunited. Luckily for Shyamala, Nandana had doubts about Prakashan beforehand and so had given him a pen well before this incident. The pen had a hidden camera in it and it captured all the events that proved Shyamala innocence. The mafia behind the scandal gets arrested. Shyamala accepts Nandana as her daughter-in-law and reconciles with her family.

== Cast ==
- Uravashi as Revenue Minister.Shyamala Vasudevan
  - Esther Anil as Young Shyamala
- Kunchako Boban as Akash Vasudevan
- Sai Kumar as UDC Vasudevan
- Bhama as Nandana Vishwanathan
- Suraj Venjaramood as Kollamkavu Pappan
- Nedumudi Venu as Shekaran IAS
  - Abatis Thokalath as Young Shekaran
- Geetha Vijayan as Shekaran's wife
- Jagadish as Subram – Shekaran's secretary
- P. Sreekumar as Chief Minister
- Mahesh
- Priyanka Anoop
