= Kaalchilambu =

2008 film by MT Annoor

- Directed by: M. T. Annoor
- Written by: M. Sukumarji
- Screenplay by: M. Sukumarji
- Produced by: Madhu Marangad
- Cinematography: Uthpal V. Nair
- Edited by: Ranjan Abraham
- Music by: Kaithapram Damodaran Namboothiri
- Distributed by: Yem Yem Films
- Release date: 20 August 2021
- Country: India
- Language: Malayalam

Kaalchilambu is a 2021 Indian Malayalam-language romantic horror tragedy film directed by M. T. Annoor which was released after it was delayed for more than ten years. The film was released through Action Prime OTT Platform on 20 August 2021 as an Onam release.

== Synopsis ==
How the love affair between Kannan, a Theyyam artiste from a lower caste, and Karthika, a woman who hails from an aristocratic family, results in banishment from society and a series of unfortunate incidents form the crux of the story.

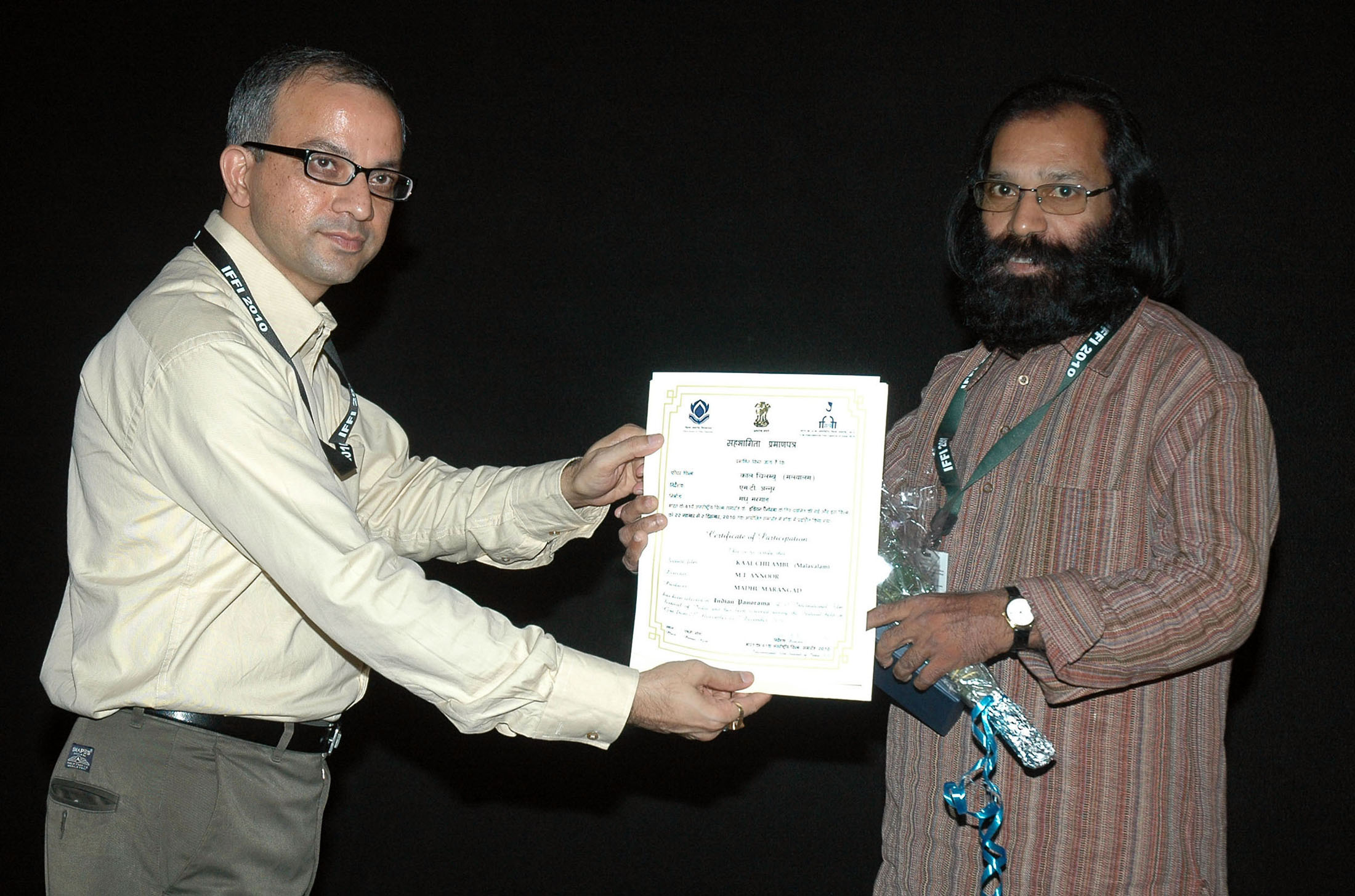
Director M. T. Anoor, being felicitated on the presentation of the film, at IFFI 2010

== Cast ==
- Vineeth in a dual role as
  - Kannan, (Theyyam) artist
  - Jayadevan (Engineer)
- Samvrutha Sunil as Karthika Thamburatty, Kannan'a Love interest
- Sai Kumar
- Madhupal
- Mala Aravindan
- Mohan Sharma
- Narayanankutty
- V. K. Sreeraman
- Vidhya Mohan
- Harish Siva
- Sabitha Anand
- Augustine
- Kozhikode Narayanan Nair
