= Ajantha (2009 film) =

- Poster in Malayalam
- Directed by: Rajppa Ravishankar
- Story by: Elora Movie Club Inc
- Produced by: Rajppa Ravishankar
- Starring: Ramana; Venkatesh; Vinu Mohan; Sai Kiran; Honey Rose; Vandana Gupta
- Cinematography: Ilavarasu
- Music by: Ilaiyaraaja
- Production company: Elora Movie Club Inc
- Release dates: 30 October 2009 (Karnataka); 19 July 2012 (Kerala); 9 November 2012 (Tamil Nadu)
- Country: India
- Languages: Kannada; Malayalam; Tamil

Ajantha is an Indian film produced and directed by Rajppa Ravishankar. The film was simultaneously shot in Kannada, Malayalam, Tamil and Telugu languages with different starcast.

The lead role was played by Venkatesh in Kannada, Vinu Mohan in Malayalam, Ramana in Tamil and Sai Kiran in the Telugu versions, respectively. Honey Rose was female lead in the Malayalam and Kannada version while Vandana Gupta played the female lead in the Tamil and Telugu versions.

Ilaiyaraaja composed the music and Ilavarasu was the cinematographer for the film. The Kannada version was released on 30 October 2009, the Malayalam version was released on 19 July 2012, and the Tamil version was released on 9 November 2012. The Telugu version is yet to release.

== Cast ==
Actor (Kannada)	Actor (Malayalam)	Actor (Tamil)	Role
Venkatesh	Vinu Mohan	Ramana	Anand
Honey Rose		Vandana Gupta	Ajantha
Sai Kiran			Dr. Aravinth
Aniyappan		Su. Senthil Kumaran	Anand's friend
Anand		Sriman	Singer
Vijay Babu	Mamukkoya	Vijay Babu	Music director
Honnavalli Krishna	Harisree Asokan	Pandiarajan	
Honnavalli Krishna	Kundara Johny	Pandiarajan	
Bank Janardhan	Kalabhavan Santhosh	Manobala	Producer
Mandeep Roy	Salim Kumar	Madhan Bob	
Dingri Nagaraj	—	Balu Anand	
Rajppa Ravishankar			Special appearances
K. Sivasankar			Special appearances

== Production ==
Kathaga Thirumavalavan was originally chosen to direct the film however due to creative differences between him and the film's producer Rajpa Ravishankar, the latter decided to direct the rest of the film.

== Music ==
Ajantha

Soundtrack album by Ilaiyaraaja
- Released: 2007
- Recorded: 2007
- Genre: Feature film soundtrack
- Languages: Kannada; Malayalam; Tamil; Telugu

Ilaiyaraaja recorded a record-breaking 36 songs for the film in a week. Ilaiyaraaja won the Tamil Nadu State Film Award for Best Music Director of 2009 for the film.

Kannada version

K. Kalyan wrote the lyrics.

- "Aaye Aaye" - Madhumitha
- "Elli Iruve Swarave" - Ilaiyaraaja, Nanditha
- "Elli Iruve Swarave - 2" - Ilaiyaraaja, Manjari
- "Haaku Baa Ondu Beettu" - Murali, Shweta Mohan
- "Kaigalalli Keyboardu" - Tippu
- "Oh Oh Oh Ivanaa Ivanaa" - Nanditha
- "Pannavu Konchavu" - Nanditha
- "Yaaru Hogada Jaaga" - Vijay Yesudas, Bhavatharini
- "Yaaru Yaarendu" - Vijay Prakash

Malayalam version

S. Ramesan Nair wrote the lyrics.

- "Aarum Thodatha Poovil" - Madhu Balakrishnan, Bhavatharini
- "Aayae Aayae" - Madhumitha
- "Hradayam Thedum" - Madhu Balakrishnan, K. S. Chitra
- "Kaiyil Oru Key Board" - Madhu Balakrishnan
- "Oh Oh Madana Madana" - K. S. Chitra
- "Oruvan Oruval Yen" - Vijay Yesudas
- "Thurigai Illa" - K. S. Chitra
- "Vekkada Onnu" - Naveen, Swetha

Tamil version

Mu. Mehta, Pa. Vijay, Snehan, Muthulingam, Thirumavalavan and Su. Senthilkumar wrote the lyrics.

- "Engae Irundhai" – K. J. Yesudas, Manjari
- "Engae Irundhai Isaiyae" – Ilaiyaraaja
- "Engae Irundhai" (Repeat) – Yesudas, Manjari
- "Oh Oh Ilaignan" – Manjari
- "Kaiyil Oru Keyboardum" – Tippu
- "Keerthanai" – Madhumitha
- "Poduda Sakkapodu" – Shweta Mohan, Tippu
- "Thoorigai Indri" – Manjari
- "Yaarum Thodatha Ondrai" – Ilaiyaraaja, Shreya Ghoshal
- "Yarukku Yarendru" – P. Unnikrishnan

Telugu version

Vennelakanti wrote the lyrics.

- "Aayae Aayae" - Madhumitha
- "Chetilo Key Board" - Tippu
- "Evarukku Evarani" - K. J. Yesudas
- "Evarum Thakkani" - Vijay Prakash, Manjari
- "Kunche Lekha" - Manjari
- "Oh Oh Evvanam Evvanam" - Manjari
- "Raavae Swarama" - Vijay Yesudas, K. S. Chitra
- "Raavae Swarama" - Vijay Yesudas, K. S. Chitra
- "Veyyara Okka Beetu" - Tippu, Shweta Mohan

== Reception ==
Regarding the Tamil version, a critic from Dinamalar wrote that the film is devoid of major twists and that the music is the saving grace.
