= Bhama Kurup =

Indian actress

Bhama
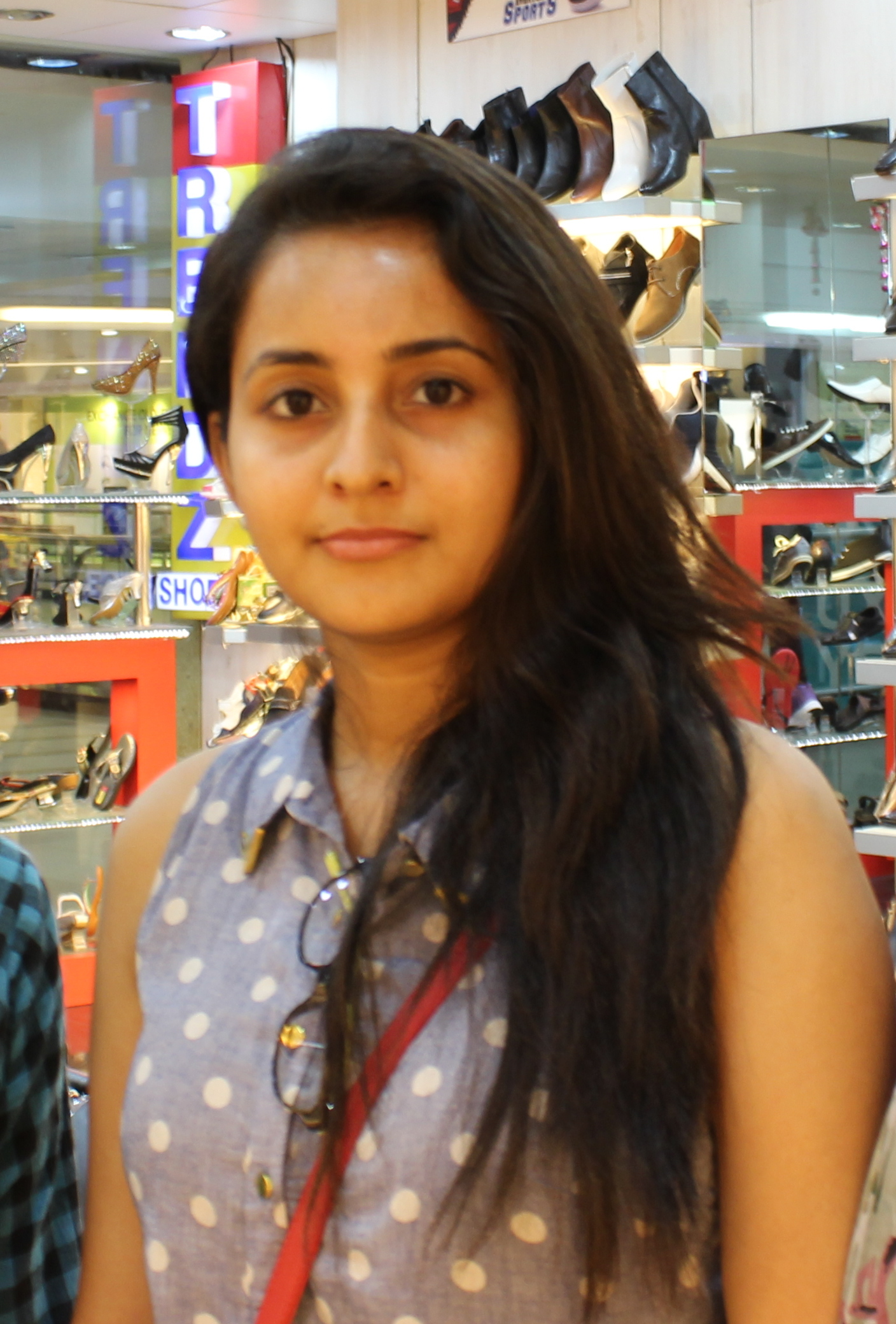
- Born: Rekhitha R. Kurup; Kottayam, Kerala, India
- Other name: Bhama Kurup
- Occupation: Actress
- Years active: 2007–2019 ; 2025–2026
- Children: 1
- Parent(s): Rajendran Kurup; Shylaja

Rekhitha R. Kurup, better known by her stage name Bhamaa, is an Indian actress who predominantly appeared in Malayalam and Kannada-language films. She made her cinematic debut in 2007 with the Malayalam film Nivedyam, directed by A. K. Lohithadas and had acted in over 42 films.

== Early life and education ==
Bhama is the youngest daughter of Rajendra Kurup & Shylaja. She has two elder sisters, Reshmitha R. Kurup and Renjitha R. Kurup.

Bhama did her schooling at St. Mary's Higher Secondary School, Manarcad and Infant Jesus Bethany Convent Girl's Higher Secondary School, Manarcad. She pursued a bachelor's in Sociology by correspondence course.

== Career ==
Before she entered into the film industry, she was the host of a show on Surya TV titled Thaali. She has also acted in a Christian devotional album. Director Lohithadas selected her as her first movie's lead heroine in Nivedyam. Her second film was Hareendran Oru Nishkalankan, directed by Vinayan, in which she was cast opposite Manikuttan. She paired with Vineeth Sreenivasan in Cycle directed by Johny Antony.

Bhama said that until 2011, she was getting the same kind of roles in Malayalam. She started taking up Kannada film offers, after which she started getting fresh and interesting characters in Malayalam. She acted in Sohanlal's Kadhaveedu in which she played the heroine in M. T. Vasudevan Nair's segment, and her character was that of a modern girl, a media person, who is smart and energetic. She had a small but significant role in Vinod Vijayan's segment of D Company, Day of Judgement, featuring Fahadh Faasil where she played a psycho and wore no make-up.

In 2014, she had five Malayalam releases. She played a Christian housewife in Rakesh Gopan's 100 Degree Celsius and was seen as a 15-year-old mother in Vinod Mankara's Ottamandaram. In her only non-Malayalam release of the year, the Tamil-English biographical film Ramanujan based on the mathematician Srinivasa Ramanujan, she played the role of Janakiammal, Ramanujan's wife.

=== Playback singing ===
Bhama has occasionally worked as a playback singer as well. She had reportedly sung the song "Kannil Kannil", composed by Rahul Raj for a film titled Bike; however, the film was canceled and the song remains unreleased. She lent her voice for the devotional album Maaya Madhavam (2009), and has sung the title song for the upcoming children's film Meow Meow Karimppoocha. She did voice over for the short film named Pacha directed by Sarayu. She has sung a song in the movie 100 Degree Celsius along with other heroines Ananya, Meghana Raj, and Shwetha Menon.

== Personal life ==
In January 2020, Bhama married Arun and in May 2024, announced she is a single-parent mother living with her daughter.

== Filmography ==
Year	Title	Role	Language	Notes
2007	Nivedyam	Sathya Bhama	Malayalam	Malayalam Debut - Received the Asianet Film Award for Best Star Pair Award (shared with Vinu Mohan)
2007	Hareendran Oru Nishkalankan	Indhu	Malayalam	
2008	Cycle	Annie	Malayalam	
2008	One Way Ticket	Sunanda	Malayalam	
2008	Ellam Avan Seyal	Chinthamani	Tamil	Tamil debut
2009	Swapnangalil Haisal Mary	Haisal Mary	Malayalam	
2009	Kannerinu Madhuram	Subhadra	Malayalam	
2009	Colours	Pooja	Malayalam	
2009	Ivar Vivahitharayal	Kavya	Malayalam	
2009	Oru Black and White Kudumbam	Minnu	Malayalam	
2010	Sakudumbam Shyamala	Nandana	Malayalam	
2010	Neelambari	Parvathy	Malayalam	
2010	Koottukar	Aswathy	Malayalam	
2010	College Days	Athira	Malayalam	
2010	Modalasala	Deepu	Kannada	Kannada debut
2011	Janapriyan	Meera	Malayalam	
2011	Sevenes	Gowri	Malayalam	
2011	Swapna Sanchari	Aswathi (Achu)	Malayalam	
2011	Manchivadu	Indu	Telugu	Telugu debut
2011	Shyloo	Shaileshwari (Shyloo)	Kannada	
2012	Sevarkkodi	Valli	Tamil	
2012	Husbands in Goa	Abhirami	Malayalam	
2012	Ondu Kshanadalli	Divya	Kannada	
2012	101 Weddings	Rukhiya	Malayalam	
2013	Auto Raja	Radha/Rani	Kannada	
2013	Barfi	Kushi	Kannada	
2013	Appayya	Gowri	Kannada	
2013	D Company	Jeena	Malayalam	
2013	Ambara	Arundhathi	Kannada	
2013	Kadhaveedu	Jeena	Malayalam	
2014	Konthayum Poonoolum	Amritha	Malayalam	
2014	Naku Penta Naku Taka	Shubha	Malayalam	
2014	Ramanujan	Janakiammal Ramanujan	English/Tamil	
2014	100 Degree Celsius	Nancy	Malayalam	
2014	Ottamandaram	Kala	Malayalam	
2014	Mathai Kuzhappakkaranalla	Annamma	Malayalam	
2015	Arjuna	Piya Arjuna	Kannada	
2016	Maalgudi Days	Janet	Malayalam	
2016	Marupadi	Sarah	Malayalam	
2017	Raaga	Anu	Kannada	
2018	Khilafath	Amina	Malayalam	
2025	Sumathi Valavu	Malu	Malayalam	
