= Careebeyans =

- Directed by: Irshad Ibrahim
- Produced by: Nanda Kumar
- Starring: Kalabhavan Mani; Siddique; Sai Kumar; Shweta Menon; Lena
- Cinematography: K. P. Nambyathiri
- Edited by: P. C. Mohanan
- Music by: Sreeram
- Production company: Nandana Films
- Distributed by: Devi Cinemax
- Release date: 27 September 2013
- Country: India
- Language: Malayalam

Careebeyans is a 2013 Indian Malayalam-language film, directed by Irshad and produced by Nanda Kumar. The film stars Kalabhavan Mani in triple role as hero, villain and his brother, Siddique, Sai Kumar and Shweta Menon in the lead roles.

== Cast ==
- Kalabhavan Mani in a triple role as:
  - Home Minister Viswanathan
  - Charlie
  - Charles
- Siddique as Commissioner Iqbal IPS
- Sai Kumar as Natarajan
- Janardanan as Chief Minister Eeswaran Nambiar
- Shweta Menon as Kathrine
- Venu Nagavally as Joseph
- Ramu as DGP George IPS
- Lena as Ganga
- Anand as Shiva
