= Paribhavam =

- Directed by: K A Devaraj
- Produced by: Mohan Das Karimbil
- Starring: Abhilash; Kripa
- Music by: Aparna Karimbil
- Release date: 12 June 2009
- Country: India
- Language: Malayalam

Paribhavam is a 2009 Malayalam film directed by K. A. Devaraj starring Abhilash and Kripa.

== Plot ==
Paribhavam tells the story of Chandu and Nandini who are orphans.

Nandini had to come back to Kerala after her parents were killed in US. She develops a fascination for a mute boy and soon moves into the city with him. Their public displays of affection makes the locals agitate against them.

== Cast ==
- Abhilash as Chandu
- Kripa as Nandini
- Machan Varghese
- Kulappulli Leela
- Laxmi Sharma
- Jagathy Sreekumar
- Jagadish
- Mala Aravindan
- Indrans
- Narayanankutty
- K K Jayesh
- Sunil Kecheri
