= Oru Black and White Kudumbam =

- Directed by: Shaiju Anthikkad
- Produced by: M. Mani
- Starring: Jayasurya; Kalabhavan Mani; Bhama
- Cinematography: Jibu Jacob
- Music by: Alex Paul
- Release date: 2 September 2009
- Country: India
- Language: Malayalam

Oru Black and White Kudumbam (transl. A black and white family) is a 2009 Indian Malayalam film by Shaiju Anthikkad starring Jayasurya and Kalabhavan Mani.

== Plot ==
Oru Black & White Kudumbam movie is about a handsome guy Adithya Varma who is the son of a dark-skinned father Antony and a fair-skinned mother Lakshmi. Antony is a lorry driver, a man who has a complex about his colour, more so since his wife, who belongs to a Kovilakam family, is fair and beautiful.

This family is known as 'Oru Black and White Kudumbam' in their neighborhood and the basic plot revolves around the backdrop of tensions that Antony creates in his house in the name of colour.

== Cast ==
- Jayasurya as Adithyan Antony
- Kalabhavan Mani as Antony
- Bhama as Minnu, Aadhi's girlfriend, and later wife
- Vinaya Prasad as Lakshmi
- Lalu Alex as Bhaskara Varma
- Janardhanan as Madhava Varma
- Suraj Venjaramood as Manjula Kumaran (Manjulan)
- Anoop Chandran as Peethambaran
- Bijukuttan as Kakka Thampuran
- Sudheesh as Rahul (Thomas Mathew)
- Narayanankutty as a worker in Minnus group
- Kochu Preman as Cheriachan
- Ponnamma Babu as Rahul's mother and Madhava Varma's wife
- Kottayam Nazeer
- Kollam Thulasi as Police Officer
- Manka Mahesh
- Lakshmi Priya
- Krishna Praba
- Manju Pillai
