= Kavasseri =

Gram panchayat in the Palakkad district, Kerala, India

Kavassery is a gram panchayat in the Palakkad district, state of Kerala, India. It is a very local government organisation that serves the villages of Kavasseri-I and Kavasseri-II. Its postal code is from 678543 to 678545.

== Demographics ==
As of 2011 India census, Kavasseri-I had a population of 17,333 with 8,448 males and 8,885 females.

As of 2011 India census, Kavasseri-II had a population of 11,855 with 5,683 males and 6,172 females.
