= Vinu Mohan =

Indian actor

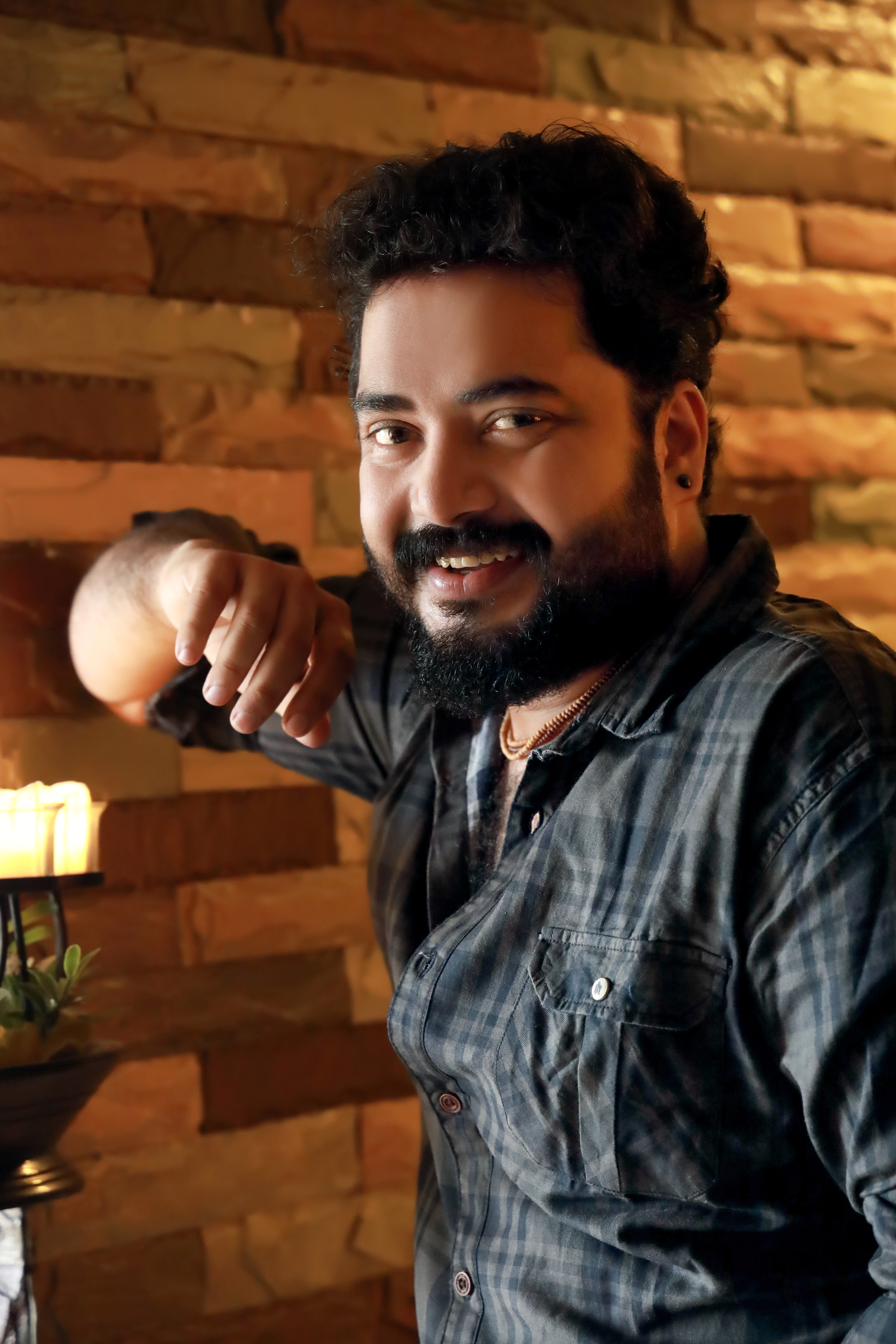
- Born: 12 May 1986 (age 40); Kottarakkara, Kollam, Kerala
- Years active: 2007–present
- Parents: K. Mohan Kumar; Shobha Mohan
- Relatives: Kottarakkara Sreedharan Nair (Grandfather); Sai Kumar (Uncle); Bindu Panicker (Aunt); Anu Mohan (Brother)

Vinu Mohan (born 12 May 1986) is an Indian actor who appears in Malayalam films. He made his debut in the 2007 film Nivedyam, directed by A. K. Lohithadas. Referred to as Galaxy Star in the media, he is the grandson of the actor Kottarakkara Sreedharan Nair, son of actors K. Mohan Kumar and Shobha Mohan, and nephew of actor Sai Kumar.

== Early life and family ==
Vinu Mohan was born to actors K. Mohan Kumar and Shobha Mohan in Kottarakkara, Kerala, India. He is the grandson of the veteran actor Kottarakkara Sreedharan Nair and nephew of Sai Kumar. Actor Anu Mohan is his younger brother. He attended Government Boys Higher Secondary School in Karunagappalli and Government Model B.H.S.S, Thiruvananthapuram.

== Career ==
He started his acting career with the multilingual film Ajantha, but its release was delayed until 2012. His first release was Nivedyam in 2007, for which he won the Asianet Best Star Pair Award with his costar, Bhama.

Sai Kumar was cast as the villain in the film Cycle, in which Vinu played the lead role along with Vineeth Sreenivasan. In 2009, he acted alongside Mammootty in the film Chattambinadu. He played leading roles in Sultan (2008) and Koottukar (2010). He portrayed the role of Manikuttan in Pulimurugan (2016) starring Mohanlal. In 2017, he acted in Jomonte Suvisheshangal alongside Dulquer Salmaan.

== Filmography ==
Year	Title	Role	Notes
2005	Kanne Madanguka	V. Harikumar	
2007	Nivedyam	Mohan Krishnan	Won: Asianet award for Best Newcomer
2008	Sultan	Sivan	
2008	Cycle	Sanju	
2009	Dalamarmarangal	Praveen	
2009	Chattambinadu	Murukan	
2009	Colours	Rahul	
2009	Keralotsavam 2009	Sandeep Subramaniam / Javed Ibrahim	
2010	Inganeyum Oral	Rahul	
2010	Koottukar	Unnikrishnan	
2010	Holidays	Alby	
2011	Nadakame Ulakam	Murali	
2011	Bombay Mittayi	Suresh	
2012	Ee Thirakkinidayil	Ananthan	
2012	Ajantha		Filmed in 2006; Delayed release
2014	My Dear Mummy	Rahul	
2015	Nee-Na	Sunnykutty	
2016	Pulimurugan	Manikuttan	
2017	Jomonte Suvisheshangal	Alfi	
2018	Sthaanam	Prasad	
2018	Paviyettante Madhurachooral	Anandu	
2019	Janaadhipan	Anand	
2019	Ittymaani: Made in China	Ajjo	
2020	Prapancha Nayakan	Churuttu 'Sultan'	
2022	Oru Nadan Premam		
TBA	L3: Azrael	TBA	

== Television ==
Year	Title	Role	Notes
2021	Swantham Sujatha	Himself	Surya TV series
2023–present	Mayamayuram	Himself/ production	Zee Keralam series
