= Sai Kumar (Malayalam actor) =

Indian actor

Saikumar
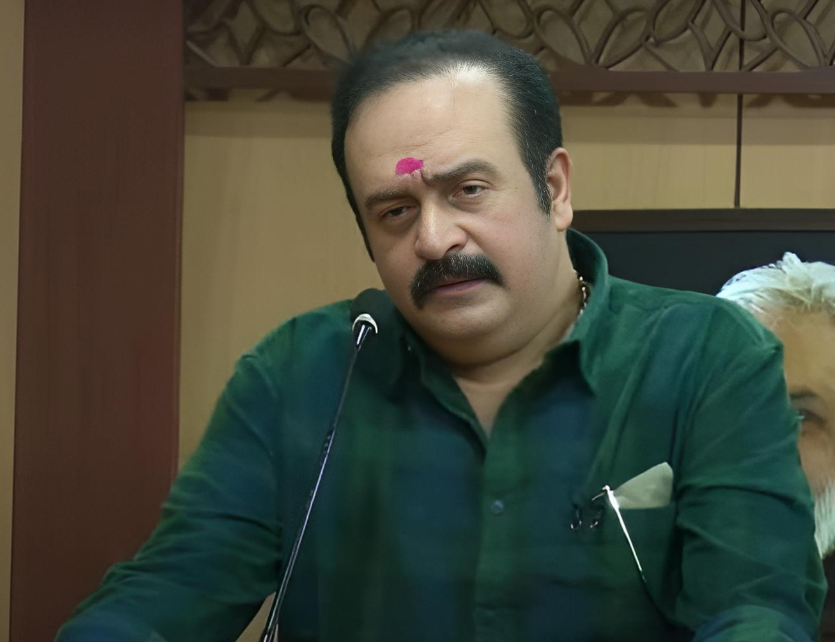
- Born: Kollam, Kerala
- Occupation: Actor
- Years active: 1977–present
- Spouses: Prasanna Kumari (m. 1986; div. 2007); Bindu Panicker (m. 2009)
- Children: 1
- Parents: Kottarakkara Sreedharan Nair; Vijayalakshmi Amma
- Relatives: Shobha Mohan (sister); Vinu Mohan (nephew); Anu Mohan (nephew); Vidhya Mohan

Sai Kumar, also credited as Saikumar, is an Indian actor who appears in Malayalam films. He is the son of the late Malayalam actor Kottarakkara Sreedharan Nair. He appears in both positive and negative roles. He notably plays the hero role in Ramji Rao Speaking, and the villain in Makkal Mahatmyam.

== Personal life ==
Sai Kumar is the son of actor Kottarakkara Sreedharan Nair and Vijayalakshmi Amma. He has seven sisters, five of whom are elder and two younger to him. Actress Shobha Mohan is his elder sister and actors Vinu Mohan and Anu Mohan are his nephews. He was first married to Prasanna Kumari, but divorced in 2007. They have a daughter named Vaishnavi, who is also an actress in TV serials, from his first marriage. He later married actress Bindu Panicker.

== Career ==
Sai Kumar started his career in theatre. He was offered the lead role in the film Swathi Thirunal (film), but it was later done by Anant Nag. He made his debut in the blockbuster Ramji Rao Speaking (1989). It was directed by two debutantes, Siddique and Lal (Siddique-Lal), and had debutant actors Sai Kumar and Rekha in the lead. Sai Kumar debuted in cinema in the 1977 film Vidarunna Mottukal as a child artist. He started his career with comedy roles, and gradually moved to character roles. He won the Kerala State Film Award for Second Best Actor for his performance in the 2007 film Anandabhairavi.

The success of the film helped him to earn a lot of opportunities in the next few years. He has done leading roles in a few films such as Sauhradam, Thudarkkatha, Khoshayathra, Anantha Vrithantham, and Thooval Sparsam. But in that age of comedy, he could not make an impact as a hero, while Mukesh, Jagadeesh and Siddique were cast in low-budget movies. Sai Kumar remained active in the industry with supporting, character and negative roles in films including In Harihar Nagar, Saandram, Makkal Mahalmyam, Griha Pravesam and Ayushkalam. The sequel to Ramji Rao Speaking; Mannar Mathai Speaking was a blockbuster of 1995. This time Mukesh played the lead role. His villain role in Mammootty's 1996 blockbuster Hitler was noted. This earned him the reputation of acting the intelligent villain. Sai Kumar's real talent was shown once again in the year 2004 in the film Sethuramayyar CBI. He wisely recreated the sound modulation and mannerisms of actor Sukumaran, because the character which Sai Kumar had done was the son of "Inspector Devadas" in the film Oru CBI Diary Kurippu.

Sai Kumar's golden period started in the late 1990s. He was cast in the super hit Aaraam Thampuran by Shaji Kailas where he played the close friend of hero acted by the Malayalam film star Mohanlal. Then he became the inevitable ingredient of all the superstar movies. He played villain to Mohanlal in Narasimham (2000), Thandavam (2002) and Chathurangam (2002). His prominence was evident from the posters of Thandavam, where his pictures were printed the same size as Mohanlal's. In movies such as Valliettan and Vesham he played villain to Mammootty. In the Dileep movie Kunjikkoonan (2002), he appeared in a completely different get-up of a cruel Goonda called Garudan Vasu, which was much acclaimed.

2005 was a very good year for Sai Kumar in which he acted in Rajamanikyam, Mammootty's mega-hit where he played an older man. This made the directors rethink his range of characters. In Suresh Gopi's comeback film Bharathchandran I.P.S., he played the villain. He described the role as an anti-hero, not a villain, since he leads the story in the first 45 minutes until Suresh Gopi appears. He also played the supporting role as DYSP Pothen in the Suresh Gopi hit The Tiger.

He lent his voice for Sathyaraj in Aagathan and also dubbed for Thiagarajan in Thilakkam.

In 2007, he won accolades for his performance as a Kathakali artist and the father of a highly talented but ailing son in Anandabhairavi. Director Vinayan described him as talented as Mohanlal, which is the best compliment for his acting abilities.

== Awards ==
- 2007 — Kerala State Film Award for Second Best Actor for Anandabhairavi
- 2015 — Asianet Film Award for Best Supporting Actor for Ennu Ninte Moideen
- 2008 — Filmfare Award for Best Supporting Actor – Malayalam for Anandabhairavi

== Partial filmography ==
=== Malayalam films ===
==== 1970s & 80s ====
Year	Title	Role	Notes
1977	Vidarunna Mottukal	Vikraman	Child artist
1981	Kathayariyathe	Shaji	
1982	Ithum Oru Jeevitham	Kuttan	
1989	Ramji Rao Speaking	Balakrishnan	Debut film in a leading role
1989	Nagapanchami		

==== 1990s ====
Year	Title	Role	Notes
1990	Purappad	Shivan	
1990	Annakutty Kodambakkam Vilikunnu	Chandy Kunju	
1990	Sunday 7.P.M	Williams	
1990	Rajavazhcha	Vijayaraghavan	
1990	Orukkam	Freddy	
1990	In Harihar Nagar	Andrews	
1990	Kuruppinte Kanakku Pustakom	Girish	
1990	Ee Kannikoodi	Ravindran	
1990	Anantha Vruthantham	Ananthan	
1990	Oliyambukal	Thampi	
1990	Thoovalsparsham	Vinod	
1990	Saandhram	Unni	
1990	Ananthanum Appukkuttanum Aanayundu		
1991	Kakkathollayiram	Ravi	
1991	Bhoomika	Ravi	
1991	Kadalorakattu	Vijayan	
1991	Kilukkampetti	Raju	
1991	Agni Nilavu	Dileep	
1991	Vacation		
1991	Souhridham	Rajmohan	
1991	Oru Tharam Randu Tharam Moonu Tharam	Suresh	
1991	Thudar Katha	Vishnu Narayanan	
1991	Khanta Kavyam		
1991	Arangu	Xavier Robert Pereira	
1991	Vasudha		
1991	Apoorvam Chilar	Dr. Suresh Warrier	
1991	May Dinam	Martin	
1991	Irikku M. D. Akathundu	Suresh	
1992	Maanthrika Cheppu	Sabu Cheriyan	
1992	Makkal Mahatmiyam	Krishnankutty	
1992	Satyaprathinja		
1992	Kasarkode Kadarbhai	Sreenivasa Menon	
1992	Neelakurukkan		
1992	Ezhara Ponnana	Balan	
1992	Pramanikal		
1992	Sooryachakram		
1992	Vasudha		
1992	Congratulations Miss Anitha Menon		
1992	Ellarum Chollanu	Dasutty	
1992	Aayushkalam	Alex	
1992	Oru Kochu Bhoomikulukkam	Adv. Abdul Salim	
1993	Ghoshayathra	Abdu	
1993	Kulapathy		
1993	Journalist	Venu	
1993	Injakkadan Mathai & Sons		
1993	Chamayam	Charlie	
1993	Easwaramoorthy IN	SI Ramesh/Hari	
1994	Kambolam	Royachan	
1994	Paalayam	Arun	
1994	Pidakkozhi Koovunna Noottandu	Binoy Vishwam	
1994	Gothram		
1995	Mannar Mathai Speaking	Balakrishnan	
1995	Thriumanassu	Nandan	
1995	Sundari Neeyum Sundaran Njanum	Mahadevan	
1996	Kireedamillatha Rajakkanmar	Mathews	
1996	Hitler	Nandakumar	
1997	Bhoopathi	Sasi Varma	
1997	Snehasindooram		
1997	Rajathanthram	Rameshan	
1997	Asuravamsam	Bobby	
1997	Sibiram	Xavier	
1997	Vamsam	Kurishinkal Vavachan	
1997	Janadhipathyam	K. Gopinatha Menon	
1997	Aaram Thampuran	Nandakumar	
1998	Samantharagal	a political leader	
1998	Alibabayum Ararakallanmarum	MLA Jose Parakkan	
1998	Nakshatratharattu	Jayan	
1998	Mayilpeelikkavu	Shankaran	
1998	The Truth	DYSP John	
1998	Ayushman Bava	Prakash	
1998	Aaghosham		
1999	Ustaad	Giri	
1999	Stalin Sivadas	Commissioner Sarath	
1999	Vasanthiyum Lakshmiyum Pinne Njaanum	Thomas Chacko	
1999	Vazhunnor	Parakkadan Aloshy	
1999	The Godman	MP Jayadevan	
1999	Angene Oru Avadhikkalathu	Babu	
1999	Pallavur Devanarayanan	Zachariah	
1999	Independence	Raghavan (CM)	
1999	Aayiram Meni	Bharathan	
1999	Jananayakan	Eliyas	

==== 2000s ====
Year	Title	Role	Notes
2000	Narasimham	Manappally Sudheeran IPS	
2000	Life Is Beautiful	Suraj's father	
2000	Neelathadakathile Nizhalpakshikal		
2000	Punaradivasam		
2000	Valliettan	Patteri Sivaraman Nair	
2000	Summer Palace		
2000	Varavaay	Vijayachandran	
2000	Daivathinte Makan	Peter	
2000	Dada Sahib	Mohammad Kutty	
2001	Karumadikkuttan	Nandini's father	
2001	Rakshasa Rajav	ADGP Gomas Alexander	
2001	Ravanaprabhu	Unni	
2001	Nagaravadhu	Narendra Babu	
2001	Agraharam		
2001	Suryachakram		
2001	Unnathangalil	Antony	
2002	Oomappenninu Uriyadappayyan	Rajasekhara Varma	
2002	Krishnapakshakilikal		
2002	Kunjikoonan	Vasu	
2002	Shivam	Medayil Devarajan	
2002	Thandavam	Sankar Das	
2002	Videsi Nair Swadesi Nair	Sivapal	
2002	Chathurangam	K.C. Korah	
2002	Nandanam	Ramadasan	
2002	Ente Hridhayathinte Udama	Rajeevan	
2003	Vasanthamallika	Varadarajan	
2003	Pattalam	Vishwanathan	
2003	Mizhi Randilum	R. P	
2003	The Kingmaker Leader	Varghese	
2003	Janakeeyam	Ravi	
2003	War and Love	Maj. Prabhakaran	
2003	Ammakilikkoodu	Sidharth	
2004	Sethurama Iyer CBI	Sathya Das	
2004	Sasneham Sumithra	DYSP Sathyadas, son of retd. DYSP Devadas	
2004	Kerala House Udan Vilpanakku	Mahendran Kondody	
2004	Udayam	Kochu Varkey	
2004	Koottu	Vishwambharan	
2004	Agninakshathram	Swami	
2004	Thalamelam	C.R. Dasan	
2004	Mayilattam	Thevar	
2004	Thudakkam	Jacob Mathew I.A.S	
2004	Vesham	Sivan	
2005	Finger Print	Prathapa Varma	
2005	Chandrolsavam	Karunakaran	
2005	Viralthumbilaaro		
2005	Pauran	Gopalji	
2005	Bharathchandran I.P.S.	Haidar Ali Hassan	
2005	Naran	Inspector Ayyappan Menon	
2005	OK Chacko Cochin Mumbai	CI Ramanathan	
2005	Manikyan		
2005	Rajamanikyam	Rajarathnam Pillai	
2005	Mayookham	Indira's father	
2005	The Tiger	DYSP Joseph Pothan	
2006	Lion	Pavithran	
2006	Parayam		
2006	The Speed Track	Doctor	
2006	Achante Ponnumakkal		
2006	Rashtram	Nooruddin	
2006	Chinthamani Kolacase	Kannai Parameshwaran	
2006	Balram vs. Tharadas		
2006	Ashwaroodan	Manikoth Marthandan	
2006	Prajapathi	M. L. A. Kuttikrishnan	
2006	Chess	Krishnadas	
2006	Keerthi Chakra	Dutta	
2006	Aanachandam	Anirudhan	
2006	Bhargavacharitham Moonnam Khandam	Ramanathan	
2006	Mahha Samudram	MLA Sebastian	
2006	Pathaka	Faruk Sha	
2006	The Don	Advocate Subrahmaniam Swami	
2006	Pothan Vava	Sivankutty	
2006	Chakkara Muthu	Police Officer	
2006	Yes Your Honour	Isaac Samuel	
2006	Baba Kalyani	Isa Muhammad Haji	
2007	Maayavi	Aaranimuttom Sivasankaran Pillai	
2007	Detective	James Joseph	
2007	Payum Puli	Josettan	
2007	Anandabhairavi	Vasudeva Panikker	
2007	Chotta Mumbai	Phylwan Michael Ashan	
2007	Time	Koshy Abraham Koshy	
2007	Sooryan	Harinarayanan	
2007	Ayur Rekha	Venugopal	
2007	Flash	Menon	
2008	Roudram	Sethu Madhavan/Sethu Mohan Das	
2008	Chithrasalabhangalude Veedu		
2008	Cycle	DYSP Surendran	
2008	Kanichukulangarayil CBI	Ajith	
2008	Positive	Bhaskar, City Police Commissioner	
2008	Madambi	Madhava Menon	
2008	Minnaminnikkoottam	Charulatha's father	
2008	Mayakazhcha	Narendran	
2008	Mayabazar	Simon Joseph	
2008	Twenty:20	Minister Mathai	
2009	Black Dahlia	Sirajuddin	
2009	Daddy Cool	Shiva Prasad	
2009	Puthiya Mukham	Mahi	
2009	Meghatheertham	Balunarayana Swamy	
2009	Shudharil Shudhan	Joseph	
2009	Sanmanasullavan Appukuttan	Dr. Mukerji	
2009	Dalamarmarangal	Pratapan	
2009	Utharaswayamvaram	Dr. Thomas Paul	

==== 2010s ====
Year	Title	Role	Notes
2010	Drona		
2010	Yugapurushan		
2010	Ringtone	Krishna Bhat	
2010	Thanthonni	David Lopez	
2010	Alexander The Great	Prathapa Varma	
2010	Kutty Srank	Unnithan	
2010	Inganeyum Oral	Balachandra Menon	
2010	Sakudumbam Shyamala	Vasudevan	
2010	Anwar	Ahmed Haji	
2010	Nizhal		
2010	Thoovalkattu	Hajiyar	
2011	Traffic	Dr. Saifudeen	
2011	Ithu Nammude Katha		
2011	Christian Brothers	Captain Varghese Mappila	
2011	August 15	the Party Secretary	
2011	Manikyakkallu	the District Education Officer	
2011	Lucky Jokers	Surya Varma	
2011	Kunjettan		
2011	Azhakkadal	Vazhapilly Anthony Tharakan	
2011	Veeraputhran	Hassan Koya	
2011	Kathayile Nayika		
2011	Innanu Aa Kalyanam	Sulochanan Pillai	
2012	Masters	Advocate Narayanan Thambi	
2012	The King & the Commissioner	Swami Veerabhadra Chandramouliswaran Maharaj	
2012	Mallu Singh	Govindan Kutty	
2012	Ezham Suryan	Vazhakode Unnikrishnan Namboodiri	
2012	Nadabrahmam		
2012	Cinema Company		
2012	Simhasanam	Chandragiriyill Madhava Menon	
2012	Run Baby Run	Bharathan Pillai	
2012	Vaidooryam	Bhadran	
2012	My Boss	Thekkepurakkal Prabhakara Varma	
2012	Ardhanaari	Vinayan's Father	
2012	Karmayodha	ACP Eappen Devassy	
2013	Lokpal	Manuel	
2013	Black Ticket	Gabriel	
2013	Cowboy	Rajashekhar Menon	
2013	Sound Thoma	Plapparambil Paulo	
2013	Mazhavillinattam Vare	the Theyyam artist	
2013	Rebecca Uthup Kizhakkemala	Uthup	
2013	Blackberry	Commissioner Kurian Joseph IPS	
2013	Careebeyans	Natarajan	
2013	For Sale	Joseph	
2013	Nadodimannan	CM Thomas Chacko	
2014	Mannar Mathai Speaking 2	Balakrishanan	
2014	Ring Master	Elizabeth's husband	
2014	Mr. Fraud	Intelligence DySP Sajan	
2014	Parayan Bakki Vechathu		
2014	Bad Boys		
2014	Mylanchi Moonchulla Veedu	Narayana Kurup	
2014	Garbhasreeman	Dr.Ravishankar	
2015	Mili	Prabhakaran Nair	
2015	Ammakkoru Tharattu		
2015	Ennu Ninte Moideen	Unni Moideen Sahib	
2016	Pavada	Joseph	
2016	Sahapadi 1975		
2016	Jacobinte Swargarajyam	Philip	
2016	Dooram		
2016	Paulettante Veedu		
2016	Angane Thanne Nethave Anjettennam Pinnale		
2016	James & Alice	Davis Thekkeparambil	
2016	Shikhamani	Sub-Inspector P.K. Ashok	
2017	Puthan Panam	Chandrababu	
2017	History of Joy	Andrews	
2017	Ramaleela	Sakhavu P. Sugathan	
2017	Vedham		
2017	Villain	Dr. Ram Kumar	
2018	'		
2018	Koodasha		
2018	Aanakkallan	Paraykal Thomas	
2018	Theetta Rappai		
2018	Krishnam	Balakrishnan	
2018	Chanakya Thanthram	Ram Mohan	
2018	Orayiram Kinakkalal	Lalaji	
2019	Mr & Ms Rowdy	Varghese Mappila	
2019	Lucifer	Mahesha Varma	
2019	Moonam Pralayam		
2019	1948 Kaalam Paranjathu		
2019	Pattabhiraman	Chengannur Thampuran	
2019	Subharathri	Ummer	
2019	My Santa	Kuttoosan	

==== 2020s ====
Year	Title	Role	Notes
2021	Drishyam 2	Vinayachandran	
2021	Yuvam	Chief Minister D.K. Srinivasan	
2021	Kaalchilambu		
2021	Karannakaran		
2022	Aaraattu	Satyasheelan	
2022	CBI 5: The Brain	DYSP Satyadas	
2022	Salute	Augustine Thomas	
2022	Varaal		
2022	Bachelors		
2022	Ulkkanal		
2023	Nalla Nilavulla Rathri	Achayan	
2024	Abraham Ozler		
2024	Manasa Vacha		
2024	Marivillin Gopurangal		
2024	Oru Smartphone Pranayam		
2024	Bharathanatyam	Kodiyath Bharathan Nair	
2024	Oru Anweshanathinte Thudakkam	Bishop	
2025	Rekhachithram	Francis Thadatthil	
2025	L2: Empuraan	Home Minister Mahesh Varma	
2026	Chatha Pacha	Kallathu Maani	
2026	Koodothram		
2026	Prathichaya	Comrade Kannur Jayadevan	
2026	Madhuvidhu	Marcose	
2026	Thudakkam		

=== Other language films ===
Year	Title	Role	Language	Notes
2002	Devan	Chetta Raghu	Tamil	
2003	Arasu	Sabapathy	Tamil	
2003	Vishnu		Telugu	
2009	Vaigai	Mandakalai	Tamil	
2010	Simha	Veerakesavudu	Telugu	

=== Dubbing Artist Filmography ===
Film/Series	Year	Actor Dubbed	Language Dubbed To	Notes
Kanal Kireedam	1996	Napolean	Malayalam	–
Thilakkam	2003	Thiagarajan	Malayalam	–
Karumadikkuttan	2001	Suresh Krishna	Malayalam	Frequently dubbed for this actor
Rakshasa Rajavu	2001	Suresh Krishna	Malayalam	–
Ee Pattanathil Bhootham	2009	Mahadevan	Malayalam	–
Aagathan	2010	Sathyaraj	Malayalam	–
Farzi	2023	Amol Palekar	Malayalam	Dubbed from original Hindi
Voice of Sathyanathan	2023	Anupam Kher	Malayalam	

== Television serials ==
- Neelaviriyitta Jalakam (Doordarshan)
- Sathi (Dooradarshan)
- Amma (Dooradarshan)
- Vajram (Asianet)
- Crime and Punishment (Asianet)
- Silence (Asianet)
- Snehadooram (Asianet)
- Manthram (Surya TV)
- Swantham (Asianet)
- Kayamkulam Kochunni (surya TV)
- Omanathinkal Pakshi (Asianet)
- Sahadharmini (Asianet)
- Srimahabhagavatham (Asianet)
- Vishudha Thomasleeha (Asianet)
- Pazhassiraaja (Asianet)
- Jagratha (Amritha TV)
- Vedanayude Viralppaadukal (Kairali TV)
- Pournami Thinkal (Asianet)
