= C. J. Kuttappan =

Folk singer from Kerala

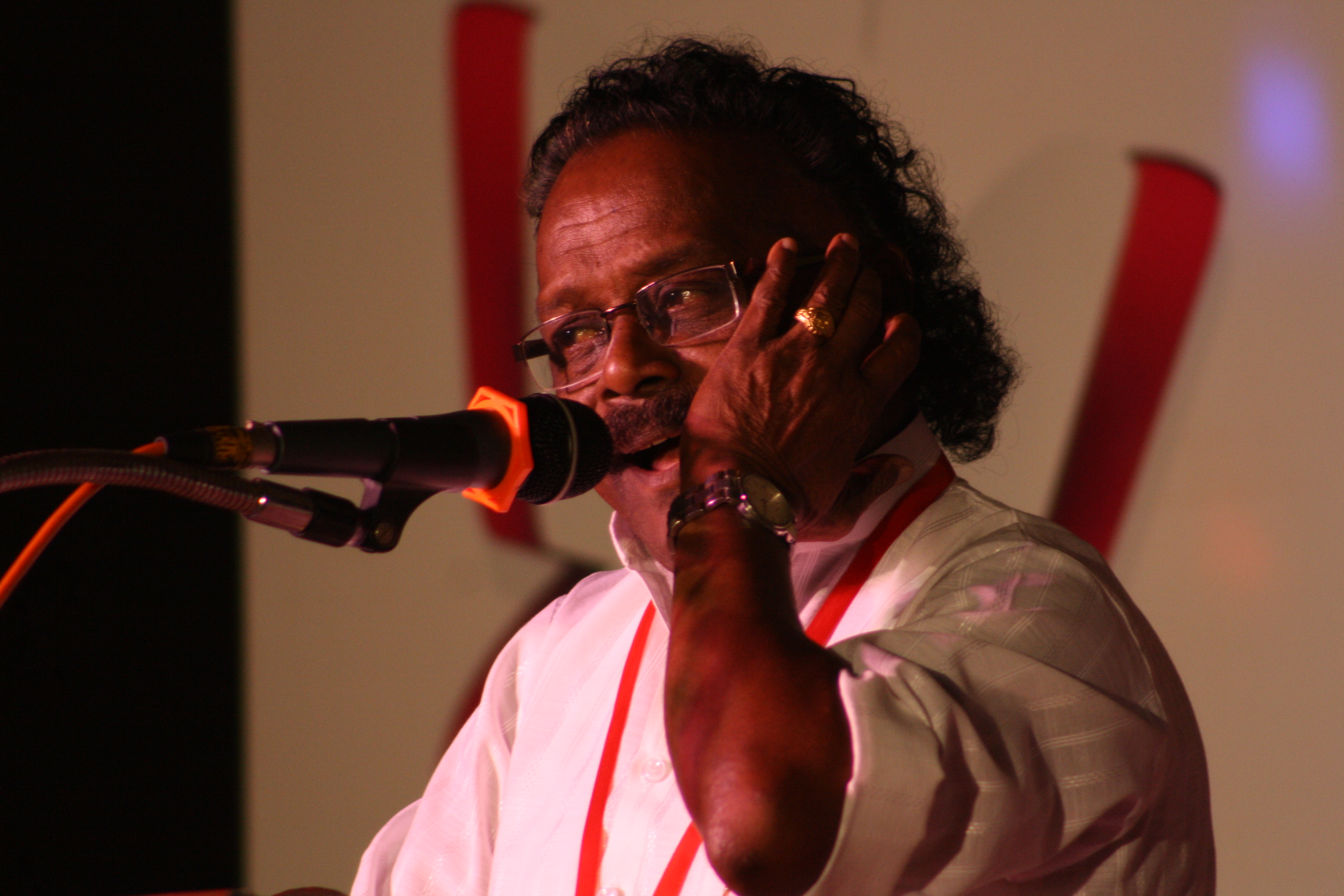
C. J. Kuttappan in 2015

C. J. Kuttappan is a folk artist from Kerala.

Kuttappan has performed in the US, Thailand, Singapore, Germany, Hong Kong, Sri Lanka, Andaman and Nicobar, and Gulf countries.

Kuttappan is the Chairman of Kerala Folklore Academy and Director, Thayillam - Folk Arts Research Center.

Kuttappan has performed on Asianet, Surya, Amrita, Indiavision, JaiHind, Reporter, Doordarshan, Kappa TV, Jeevan. He has performed folk arts, speeches, and engaged in discussions and interviews on AIR, DD. From 2001- 2003 he was the Coordinator, Folk Programmes, at Kairali TV.

== Biography ==
He was born in Chengannur, Pathanamthitta district, the eldest of four children of Kumaradas and Thankamma. His family moved to Udumbanchola in Idukki district when he was in fifth grade. In 1996, he formed his own folk music troupe Thailiyam.

== Awards ==
- Kerala State Folklore Academy Award 2012
- Samba Sivan Award
- Kalamanikyam Award

== Family ==
He and his wife Sudha have two children, Kala Kannan.
