= Colours (2009 film) =

- Directed by: Raj Babu
- Written by: V. C. Ashok
- Produced by: M. Mani
- Starring: Dileep; Roma; Bhama; Saranya Ponvannan; Vinu Mohan
- Cinematography: Saloo George
- Edited by: P. C. Mohanan
- Music by: Suresh Peters
- Release date: 2009
- Country: India
- Language: Malayalam

Colours is a 2009 Indian Malayalam-comedy language film directed by Raj Babu, starring Dileep, Roma, Bhama, Saranya Ponvannan, Vinu Mohan in the lead roles. It is an unofficial remake of the 2002 Hindi film Dil Hai Tumhaara.

== Plot ==
The story of Colours is based in Coonoor, where Lt. Col. Dr. Rajalakshmi lives with her family. The story begins from where she learns that someone has been released from jail. And the trip to bring that someone home gives her time to reminisce, and events from a year earlier are examined.

Rajalakshmi lives in Coonoor along with her two daughters Pinki and Pooja and her father-in-law, Pushkaran Pillai. Pinki, who is a tomboy, socialises with a group of men, and is often engaged in shooting for her television show Colours. Her constant companion is Rahul, who wields the camera for the television show. Though Rajalakshmi doesn't approve much of what she does, Pinki could not care less, and even calls her mother Pattalam Rajalakshmi ("Pattalam" meaning army in Malayalam). However, she does love and is loyal to her mother.

Pooja, on the other hand, is the typical coy girl, and her mother's pet. She is a teacher and is in love with a guy Sarath, with all support from Pinki. The two siblings share an intimate bond. In the meantime Rajalakshmi detects a fraud that has been going on in her hospital regarding the sales of medicines, and she is intent on bringing the culprits to book. This earns her some enemies. Lt. Cdr Sanjaynath turns up at this juncture. He is a close family friend and is on transfer to Coonnoor. On the very day of his arrival, he locks horns with Pinki, who had been his childhood friend and spoils her shooting. Though they have a conflict initially Sanjay makes it up to her by gifting her a saree on her birthday. She looks pretty in the saree and they fall in love. Actually, Rahul was secretly in love with Pinky but knowing about this relationship, he keeps his love a secret. Meanwhile, Rajalakshmi fixes Pooja's marriage with Sanjay. But when she learns of Sanjay's relationship with Pinki, she thinks about Pinky's own mother. Rajalakshmi's husband had an affair with another women. Pinki was their daughter. Later both kill themselves when Rajalakshmi discovers about the relationship. Pinki is brought up by Rajalakshmi and thinks that Pinki, like her mother, is destroying her daughter's life. When Pinki knows the truth she ends her relation with Sanjay. Sanjay is confused by Pinki's unusual behavior, but reluctantly accepts. On the day before the marriage, the enemy Stephen tries to attack Rajalakshmi. Pinki saves her and kills Stephen in the ensuing tussle—a crime for which she is currently serving jail time. In the present, Pinki is being released. Her whole family goes to meet her. She finds that Sanjay is still a bachelor. The film ends on a happy note.

== Cast ==
- Dileep as Lt. Commander Sanjaynath
- Roma as Pinky
- Bhama as Pooja
- Saranya Ponvannan as Lt. Col Dr. Rajalakshmi
- Vinu Mohan as Rahul
- Innocent as Colonel Pushkaran Pillai (Retd)
- Harisree Ashokan as Gopi
- Indrans as Kuttiraman
- Cochin Haneefa as Rahul's father
- Mamukkoya
- Narayanankutty as Police Officer
- Bose Venkat as Stephen
- Sadiq
- Kochu Preman as Keshanatha Swamikal
- Jayakrishnan as Pinky's and Pooja's father
- T. P. Madhavan
- Maya Viswanath
- Krishnaprabha
- Gayathri
- Ullas as Pooja's friend

== Reception ==
Paresh C Palicha from Rediff.com wrote that "Roma has enough fire to carry her character through. Bhama is subdued, as required. Dileep and Innocent do not put much effort into their performances. Vinu Mohan, playing Pinky's colleague, seems to be sidelined. Screenplay by V C Ashok is intriguing at first but then up a predictable route. Colours seems to be colour saturated and not a pleasant watch. Sify.com wrote that "Colours is a faux pas in every count, a film that has been made without any purpose or plot. At these times when Indians are so close to winning an Oscar, films like these are nothing less than a shame!"
