= Kaashh =

- Directed by: Sujith-Sajith
- Written by: Sujith-Sajith; Vamanapuram Mani
- Produced by: Sunil
- Starring: Rajeev Pillai; Bineesh Kodiyeri; Basil; Mehul James
- Cinematography: S. B. Prijith
- Edited by: Vivek Harshan
- Music by: Sandeep Pillai
- Production company: Oh My God Cinemas
- Distributed by: Shenoy Cinemax
- Release date: 26 October 2012
- Running time: 110 minutes
- Country: India
- Language: Malayalam

Kaashh is a 2012 Indian Malayalam-language crime comedy film written and directed by debutant filmmakers Sujith and Sajith starring Rajeev Pillai. The film is about the abduction of an industrialist's daughter by a team of four friends. The film was a box office failure.

== Cast ==
- Rajeev Pillai as Sarath
- Bineesh Kodiyeri
- Basil
- Mehul James as Shambu
- Vineeth Kumar
- Innocent as Devasia
- Mamukkoya as Manager
- Geetha Vijayan
- Lakshmi Priya
- Suraj Venjarammoodu as a trickster
- Dharmajan as the pizza boy
- Jayan as Jayasankar
- Tini Tom as Karunan
- Chembil Ashokan as the moneylender
- Leenna Panchaal as Jayasankar's daughter
- Sankar R Nair as Stephen

== Production ==
This film marked the directorial debut of Sujith S. Nair, who previously worked as an assistant to Mohan Raghavan for T. D. Dasan Std. VI B (2010).

== Critical reception ==
The film received mixed to negative reviews upon release. Paresh C. Palicha of Rediff.com rated the film and stated, "Kaashh has some glaring gaps in the narrative" and is "an average film despite having a young team of actors who have done their best."
