= Utharaswayamvaram =

- Directed by: Remakanth Sarjju
- Written by: J. Pallassery; Remakanth Sarjju (Story)
- Produced by: Santhosh Pavithram
- Starring: Jayasurya; Roma; Balachandra Menon; Lalu Alex
- Cinematography: Saloo George
- Edited by: P. C. Mohanan
- Music by: M. Jayachandran
- Release date: 6 November 2009
- Country: India
- Language: Malayalam

Utharaswayamvaram is a 2009 Malayalam film by Remakanth Sarjju (in his directorial debut). starring Jayasurya and Roma. M. Jayachandran did the music for this film.

== Plot ==
It starts with Prakashan, narrating his story to his friend Tony and Dr. Thomas Paul. He talks about his father, Sreedhara Kurup alias Yamandan Kurup, who runs a supermarket. Sreedharan wants him to become an officer but Prakashan's interests lie elsewhere. After graduation, he is more interested in the activities of the village arts club than in looking for a job. He is in love with a village girl, Uthara alias Ponnu, who is his childhood friend. But her rich father, Mahadevan, arranges her marriage with another rich boy. The story builds up from here on.

Prakashan, who works as a driver in Ponnu's house, accompanies her to her friend's house. The car breaks down. They stay at a lodge, waiting for a mechanic. During this, Prakashan's friend Shaji who gets drunk gets upset about Ponnu not realising Prakashan's love, calls a policeman to raid the lodge and catch them, so that her marriage gets called off. This happens without Prakashan's knowing. When Sreedharan finds this he scolds Prakashan but he reveals the truth to everyone. His mother Sharadha believes him but his father refuses to believe it. On getting caught and later getting released, Ponnu faces backlash from her greedy relatives and Prakashan from his father. In anger, Ponnu decides that she will only marry Prakashan and not the ones her greedy relatives want her to. Mahadevan and grandmother support this.

Prakashan finally marries Ponnu but their marriage doesn't last even for a day, when the drunk Shaji spoils the reception and accidentally says that about the raid. A misunderstanding in his statement leads everyone to believe that Prakashan told Shaji to call the police. Prakashan tries to prove his innocence but his efforts prove to be in vain. Sreedharan ousts him out of his house without even listening to what he needs to tell him.

After a year, Prakashan is finally found in a faraway place in Madras. Sreedharan requests him to come back as Sharadha waits for him every day with a lot of hope and says that he can't break his promise to her. But when they come back, Sharadha had already died of her illness. This leaves everyone devastated. Prakashan, after knowing that Ponnu is getting married, goes to her to bid a final farewell and reveals that he had only one problem that he couldn't prove his innocence to his mother and Ponnu. He gives her a bangle, bought with his hard-earned money as her wedding gift, and leaves.

Fast forward to 5 years later, Dr. Thomas suggests that Prakashan should meet Ponnu for old times sake, considering that he had saved her from an accident earlier in the day. In the hospital, he finds out that she had been discharged. Finally, he reaches and realises that Sreedharan and his sister Ambili had been the ones taking care of a depressed Ponnu. Sreedharan apologises to him for not believing him and for scolding him as he didn't know what has happened. He then explains that 5 years back, when he had left, Shaji got hit by a car and died instantly. But before he could die, he manages to explain about Prakashan's innocence to Ponnu. After this incident, she stopped talking, moving and her wedding got called off. Mahadevan died of a broken heart after seeing her condition. Her greedy relatives put her in a mental asylum, from where Sreedharan found her and looked after her.

Finally, all ends well, with Ponnu getting cured and starting a new life with Prakashan.

== Cast ==
- Jayasurya as Prakashan Kurup (Pachu)
- Roma Asrani as Uthara Mahadevan (Ponnu)
- Balachandra Menon as Elanikatharavaatil Sreedhara Kurup (Yamandan Kurup), Prakashan's Father
- Lalu Alex as Ponnuveettil Mahadevan, Ponnu's Father
- Sai Kumar as Dr. Thomas Paul
- Sudheesh as Tony
- Appa Hajaas Jayadevan
- Kiran Raj as Sudevan
- Shobha Mohan as Sharada Amma, Prakashan's Mother
- Sukumari as Mahadevan's Mother and Ponnu's Grandmother
- Janardhanan as Vasu, Mahadevan and Kurup's Friend
- Suraj Venjaramood as Pathalam Shaji
- Harisree Ashokan as Sarassappan
- Indrans as Chellappan
- Varada as Ambili, Prakashan's Sister
- Geetha Vijayan as Hema
- Lakshmi Priya
- Narayanankutty

== Soundtrack ==
- "Mallike Mallike" - Chinmayi, Vijay Yesudas
- "Amma Urangunnu" - Sudeep Kumar
- "Bangalooru" - Franco Luambo
