= Suraj Venjaramoodu filmography =

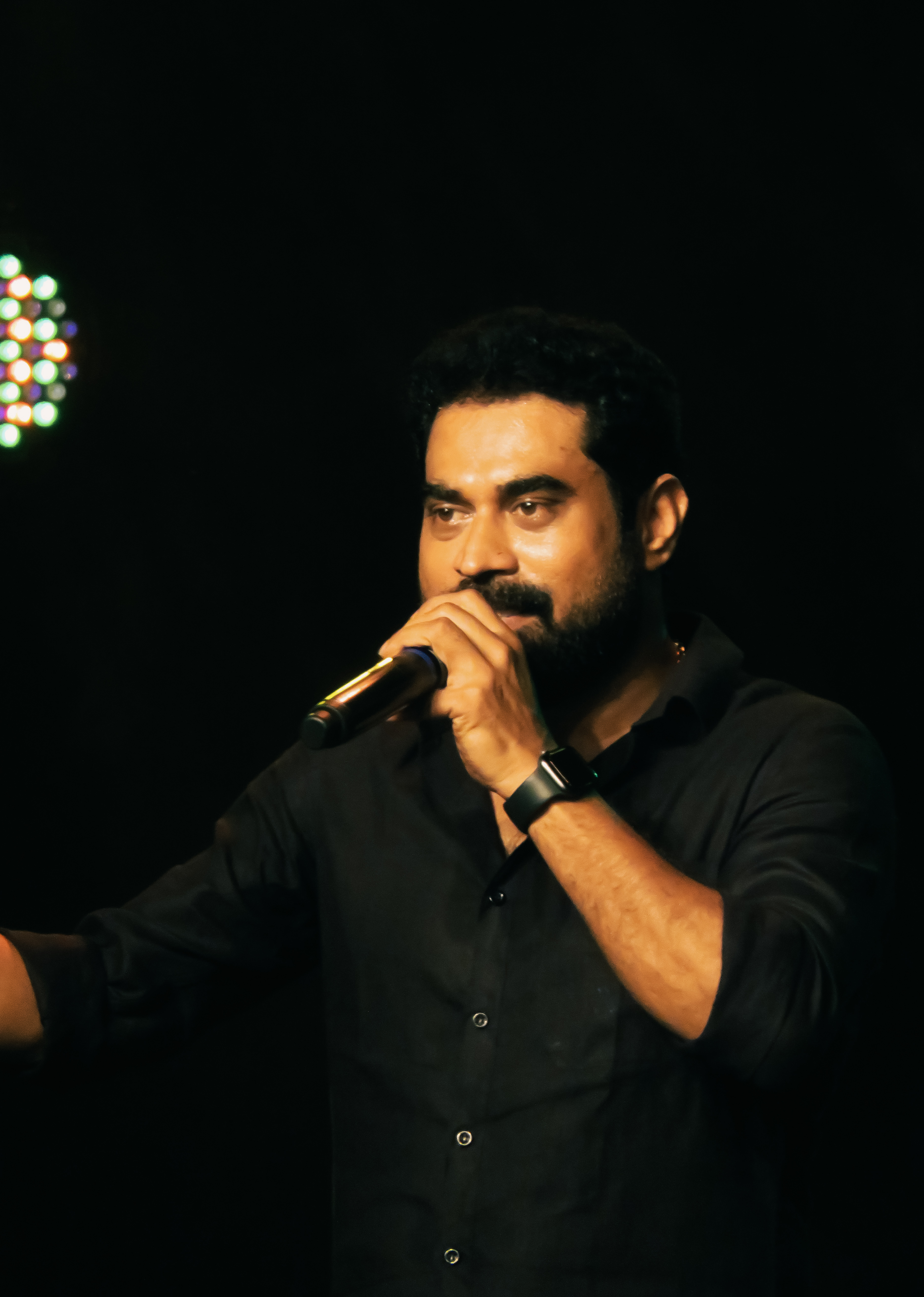
Suraj in 2022

Suraj Venjaramoodu is an Indian actor, comedian, and television presenter, who appears in Malayalam films, television and stage plays. He has won a National Film Award and four Kerala State Film Awards.

== Films ==
=== Malayalam ===
List of Suraj Venjaramoodu Malayalam film credits
Year	Title	Role	Notes
2001	Ladies & Gentleman		
2001	Jagapoga	Dada Sahib / Prabhuthan	
2004	Sethurama Iyer CBI	Broker	
2004	Rasikan	Abu's friend	
2004	Kottaram Vaidyan	Veeramani	
2005	Kalyana Kurimanam	Sugunan	
2005	Bus Conductor	Bus Conductor	
2005	Achuvinte Amma	Bus Conductor	
2005	Central	George	
2006	Shyamam	Sankaran	
2006	Rashtram	Pashupathi	
2006	Rasathanthram	Suresh	
2006	Thuruppugulan	Appukuttan	
2006	Pachakuthira	Police officer	
2006	Classmates	Ousepp	
2006	Kanaka Simhasanam	Marthandom Gopalan	
2007	Mayavi	Giri	
2007	Sketch	Bhaskaran	
2007	Chotta Mumbai	Suni	
2007	Arabikkatha	James Thiruvananthapuram	
2007	Hallo	Inspector	
2007	Nadiya Kollappetta Rathri	Thathamangalam Muthuraj	
2007	Subhadram		
2007	Veeralipattu	Pavithran	
2007	Ali Bhai	Podi Patty Kujashu	
2007	Rock & Roll	P. P. Shiju	
2007	Flash	Vaidyar	
2007	Katha Parayumbol	Pappan Kudumaloor	
2007	Romeo	Prasanth	
2007	Kanaka Simhasanam	Gopalan	
2007	Kangaroo	Babychan	
2007	Rakshakan	Kusumakumar	
2008	College Kumaran	Bhargavan	
2008	Kabadi Kabadi	Rameshan	
2008	Malabar Wedding	Pookkatta Satheeshan	
2008	Mulla	Bijumon	
2008	Annan Thambi	Peethambaran	
2008	Pachamarathanalil	Jose	
2008	Shakespeare M.A. Malayalam	Chalikkad Joshy	
2008	One Way Ticket	Chandran	
2008	Madambi	Thallu Kolli (Keedam)	
2008	Parunthu	Mahendran	
2008	Veruthe Oru Bharya	Kabir	
2008	Kurukshetra	Naik Ganeshan	
2008	Mayabazar	Paachu	
2008	Sultan		
2008	Twenty:20	Ramu	
2008	LollyPop	Jabbar	
2009	Love in Singapore	Peethambharan Kalarikkavila	
2009	Hailesa	Ulpalakshan	
2009	Venal Maram	Manoharan	
2009	Samastha Keralam PO	Abdu	
2009	Currency	Indrabalan	
2009	Ivar Vivahitharayal	Adv. Mannanthala Susheel Kumar	
2009	Dr. Patient	Indrabalan	
2009	Ee Pattanathil Bhootham	Shishupalan	
2009	Rahasya Police	SI Prakash	
2009	Daddy Cool	Mayankutty	
2009	Oru Black And White Kudumbam	Manjula Kumaran alias Manjulan	
2009	Kaana Kanmani	Bhaskaran	
2009	Loudspeaker	Counsellor Eswarapillai Kumarapillai	
2009	Duplicate	Shivankutty and Jeevanraj (Note: Dual role)	Dual Role
2009	Parayan Marannathu	Rajappan	
2009	Kerala Cafe	Kunjappayi	
2009	Utharaswayamvaram	Pathalam Shaji	
2009	Kappal Muthalaali	Josekutty	
2009	Gulumal: The Escape	A T S Shambhu	
2009	Banaras	Swami Bhogananda Chathi	
2009	My Big Father	Tony	
2009	Chattambinaadu	Dasamoolam Damu	
2010	Happy Husbands	Theepandal Raj Boss alias Rajappan	
2010	Again Kasargod Khader Bhai	SI Mithun Chakravarthy alias MC	
2010	Drona 2010	Raghu Uthaman	
2010	Cheriya Kallanum Valiya Policum	SI Simon Sebastian	
2010	Payyans	Brittas	
2010	Thanthonni	Achu	
2010	Puthumukhangal	Sandeep Menon	
2010	Pramaani		
2010	Pokkiri Raja	SI Idivettu Sugunan	
2010	Nallavan	Chittaranjan Muthalaali	
2010	Plus Two	Professor	
2010	Oru Naal Varum	Driver Girijan	
2010	Thaskara Lahala	Manikuttan	
2010	Malarvaadi Arts Club	Shekharan	
2010	Neelambari	Thrissivaperur Vamanan Nampoothiri	
2010	Sakudumbam Shyamala	Kollamkaavu Pappan	
2010	Advocate Lakshmanan - Ladies Only	Gumasthan	
2010	Nirakazhcha	Poovaar Pookutty	
2010	Swantham Bharya Zindabad	Dr. Ulapalakshan	
2010	3 Char Sau Bees	CI Sathyan	
2010	Shikkar	Barber Kuttappan	
2010	Elsamma Enna Aankutty	Broker Thomachan	
2010	Chekavar	Gunashekharan	
2010	Oridathoru Postman	PC Abhilash	
2010	Four Friends	Ringgit Shashi	
2010	Kaaryasthan	Vadivelu	
2010	Best of Luck	Shanghai Pushpan	
2010	Senior Mandrake	SI Kidukkan	
2010	Oru Small Family	Bejoysh	
2010	College Days	Shine Raj alias Munthripadam	
2011	Note Out	Vasu	
2011	The Metro	Sujathan	
2011	Arjunan Saakshi	Thankappan	
2011	Makeup Man	Kichu	
2011	Khaddama	Usman	
2011	Nadakame Ulakam	Pavanan	
2011	Christian Brothers	Pappu	
2011	China Town	Chandran Valanjavazhi	
2011	Doubles	Adv. Lawrence	
2011	Seniors	Thavala Thampi	
2011	Kanakompathu	Gopalakrishnan	
2011	Lucky Jokers		
2011	Ulakam Chuttum Valiban	Chengeri Sethu	
2011	Priyappetta Nattukare		
2011	Kottarathil Kuttibhootham		
2011	Shankaranum Mohananum		
2011	The Filmstaar	Sugunan	
2011	Kunjettan		
2011	Adaminte Makan Abu	Hyder	
2011	Kadhayile Nayika	Sugunan	
2011	Teja Bhai & Family	Swami Rajaguru Maharishi Veshya Vachassu	
2011	Shivapuram		
2011	Ninnishtam Ennishtam 2		
2011	Innanu Aa Kalyanam		
2011	Three Kings	Achuveetil Achankunju	
2011	Happy Durbar		
2011	Sandwich	Andipetty Naykkar	
2011	Pachuvum Kovalanum		
2011	Oru Marubhoomikkadha	Koya	
2011	Vellaripravinte Changathi	Himself	Special appearance
2011	Venicile Vyaapari	Chandran Pillai	
2011	Oru Nunakkadha	Chachappan	
2011	Sarkar Colony	Banykuttan	
2011	Bombay Mittayi		
2012	Kunjaliyan	Preman	
2012	Padmasree Bharat Dr. Saroj Kumar	Muttathara Babu	
2012	Thalsamayam Oru Penkutty	Shibulal	
2012	Perinoru Makan	Sugunan	
2012	Lakshmi Vilasam Renuka Makan Raghuraman		
2012	Scene Onnu Nammude Veedu		
2012	Oru Kudumba Chithram	Govardhanan	
2012	Doctor Innocent aanu		
2012	Prabhuvinte Makkal		
2012	Josettante Hero		
2012	Mullassery Madhavan Kutty Nemom P. O.		
2012	Mallu Singh	Susheelan	
2012	Spirit	Minister Muralikrishnan	
2012	Mr. Marumakan	Chantha Hamsa	
2012	Bhoopadathil Illatha Oridam	Opposition Leader	
2012	Husbands in Goa	Vasco	
2012	Kaashh	Trickster	
2012	Gruhanathan	Thampan	
2012	Ezham Suryan		
2012	Ee Thirakkinidayil		
2012	Ardhanaari		
2012	101 Weddings	Sundareshan	
2012	Manthrikan	Usthad Maambaram Maayankutty Sheikh / Payaruvila Pappan	
2013	Isaac Newton S/O Philipose	Kottur Stephen	
2013	My Fan Ramu		
2013	Proprietors: Kammath & Kammath	Sebastien Kuzhiveli	
2013	Kutteem Kolum	Chandran	
2013	Red Wine	Joe Sebastian	
2013	Sound Thoma	Uruppadi	
2013	Ithu Manthramo Thanthramo Kuthanthramo	SI Premlal	
2013	Rebecca Uthup Kizhakkemala	Balan	
2013	Abhiyum Njanum	SP Mahesh	
2013	God for Sale: Bhakthi Prasthanam	Kamalahasanan, Bhaskaran	
2013	Pigman	Dr. Daniel	
2013	Left Right Left	S P Mohammed Bilal	
2013	Pullipulikalum Aattinkuttiyum	Mamachan	
2013	Daivathinte Swantham Cleetus	Kunjachan	
2013	Vishudhan	Thomachan	
2013	Nadodimannan	Sarasappan	
2013	Ms. Lekha Tharoor Kanunnathu	Edison Igneius	
2013	Good Bad & Ugly	Benz Vasu	
2013	Ezhu Sundara Rathrikal	Prem Raj	
2014	Ettekaal Second	Sandeep's uncle	
2014	Malayalakkara Residency	Advocate Sreekesh Kumar BA, LLB	
2014	Pedithondan		
2014	Ring Master	Advocate Shravan	
2014	Polytechnic	Sakhavu Che	
2014	Law Point	Kurian Jose	
2014	How Old Are You	Benny	
2014	Ulsaha Committee	Natholi	
2014	Bhaiyya Bhaiyya	Soman	
2014	Vellivelichathil		
2014	Garbhasreeman	Sudheendran	
2014	Sreenivasan Paranja Kadha		
2014	Cousins	Pauly	
2014	Jalamsham		
2015	Elanjikkavu P.O		
2015	Ammakkoru Tharattu		
2015	Perariyathavar	Father	
2015	Perariyathavar	Father	Won—National Award for Best Actor
2015	She Taxi	K.T. Salman	
2015	Chandrettan Evideya	Narayanan Ilayath	
2015	Aashamsakalode Anna		
2015	Samrajyam II: Son of Alexander	Theeppori Thankappan	
2015	Madhura Naranga	Kasargod Ibrahim (Icha)	
2015	Jamna Pyari	S.P Sabu	
2015	Life of Josutty	Varkey	
2015	Ben	Justin	
2015	Female Unnikrishnan	Unnikrishnan	
2015	Valiya Chirakulla Pakshikal	Minister	
2015	Two Countries	Jimmy Chockly	
2016	Action Hero Biju	Pavithran	
2016	Angane Thanne Nethave... Anjettennam Pinnale		
2016	Kammatipaadam	Sumesh	
2016	Oru Murai Vanthu Parthaya	Suni	
2016	Shajahanum Pareekuttiyum	Detective Mathews	
2016	Anyarku Praveshanamilla	Valanjavazhi Shinjo	
2016	Campus Diary		
2016	Karinkunnam 6'S	Nelson	
2016	Dooram		
2016	Kochavva Paulo Ayyappa Coelho	Susheelan Kochettan	
2016	Oru Muthassi Gadha	Siby	
2016	Aneezya		
2016	Pulimurugan	Poongayi Sasi	
2017	Munthirivallikal Thalirkkumbol	Thilothaman	
2017	Aby	Xavier	
2017	Thondimuthalum Driksakshiyum	Prasad	
2017	Role Models	News reporter	
2017	Devayanam		
2017	Dance Dance		
2017	Vakku		
2017	Vilakkumaram	Fawas Ali	
2017	Varnyathil Aashanka	Dayanandhan	
2018	Parole	Varghese	
2018	Aabhaasam	Kili	
2018	Saavari	Savari	
2018	Kuttanpillayude Sivarathri	Plachiottil Kuttan Pillai	
2018	Njan Marykutty	Manoj Vaidyan	
2018	Neerali	Veerappa	
2018	Theevandi	Madhu	
2019	Mikhael	Police Officer – Issac	
2019	Peranbu	Amudhavan's friend	Only in Malayalam version
2019	Kodathi Samaksham Balan Vakeel	SI P Mohanan Pillai	
2019	Madhura Raja	Idivettu Sugunan	
2019	Oru Yamandan Premakadha	Francis	
2019	Evidey	Satheeshan	
2019	Pathinettaam Padi	Kaniyapuram Narendran	
2019	Subharathri	Adv. Harikumar	
2019	Finals	P. Varghese	250th film
2019	Vikruthi	Eldo	Won—Kerala State Film Award for Best Actor
2019	Android Kunjappan Version 5.25	VK Bhaskara Poduval	Won—Kerala State Film Award for Best Actor
2019	Chila NewGen Nattuvisheshangal	Madhusudhanan Nair	
2019	Jimmy Ee Veedinte Aishwaryam	Dimitri Rodigruez	
2019	Driving License	MVI Joseph Kuruvila	
2021	Anugraheethan Antony	Antappan	
2021	The Great Indian Kitchen	The husband	
2021	Randuper		
2021	Kaanekkaane	Paul Mathai	Released on SonyLIV
2021	Bheemante Vazhi	Manjali Tarseus	
2022	Jana Gana Mana	ACP Sajjan Kumar	
2022	Pathaam Valavu	Solomon	
2022	Heaven	CI Peter Kurishingal	
2022	Autorickshawkarante Bharya	Sajeevan	
2022	Mukundan Unni Associates	Adv. Venu	
2022	Roy	Roy	Released on SonyLIV
2023	Ennalum Ente Aliya	Balakrishnan alias Balu	
2023	Enkilum Chandrike	Pavithran	
2023	Higuita	Panniyannur Mukundan	
2023	Madanolsavam	Madanan	
2024	Grrr	Haridas Nair	
2024	Nadanna Sambhavam	Ajith Neelakandan	
2024	Adios Amigo	Sathpriyan	
2024	Thekku Vadakku	Shankunni	
2024	Mura	Ani	
2024	Extra Decent	Binu	Co-Producer
2025	Narayaneente Moonnaanmakkal	Bhaskaran	
2025	L2: Empuraan	Sajanachandran	
2025	Padakkalam	Shaji	
2025	Narivetta	CPO Basheer Ahammed	
2026	Mohiniyaattam	Govindaraja aka Govindan	
2026	Hail Mary †	TBA	

=== Tamil ===
List of Suraj Venjaramoodu Tamil film credits
Year	Title	Role	Notes
2025	Veera Dheera Sooran	Kannan	
2026	Youth	Unnikrishnan	
2026	Kara	Bharathan	
2026	Jailer 2	Dileep	

== As dubbing artist ==
Year	Film	Dubbed for	Character
2002	Shivam	Rajan P. Dev	SI Eapen
2015	Ivan Maryadaraman		Bicycle
2026	Khushi: The Princess of Jungle		Narrator

== Television ==
List of Suraj Venjaramoodu television credits
Year	Title	Role	Channel
2000	Comedy Thillana	Anchor	Kairali TV
2003–2005	Sanmanassullavarkku Samadhanam	Actor	Asianet
2005	Santhanagopalam	Actor	Asianet
2005	Ladies Hostel	Actor	Asianet
2006	Ayyadi Maname	Actor	Kairali TV
2011–2012	Comedy Stars Season 1	Judge	Asianet
2013	Jagapoga	Anchor	Kairali TV
2013	Bhima Jewels Comedy Festival	Judge	Mazhavil Manorama
2013	Bharthanganmarude Sradhakku	Judge	Asianet
2014–2017	Manampole Mangalyam	Host	JaiHind TV
2015–2016	Comedy Super Nite	Anchor	Flowers TV
2015	Junior Chanakyan	Actor	Flowers TV
2016	Sell me the answer	Temporary Host (in for Mukesh)	Asianet
2016–2017	Deal Or No Deal	Host	Surya TV
2017–2018	Comedy Super night 3	Anchor	Flowers TV
2017	Midukki	Judge	Mazhavil Manorama
2018–2019	Thakarppan Comedy Mimicry mahamela	Judge / Anchor	Mazhavil Manorama
2019	Comedy Nights with Suraj	Anchor	Zee Keralam
2020–2021	Funny Nights with Pearle Maaney	Anchor	Zee Keralam
2021	Oru Chiri Iru Chiri Bumper Chiri	Judge	Mazhavil Manorama
2022	Fastest Family First Adi Mone Buzzer Season 2	Anchor	Asianet
2023	Star Singer Junior Season 3	Guest	Asianet
2024–2025	Super Show	Judge	Zee Keralam

== Web series ==
List of Suraj Venjaramoodu web series credits
Year	Title	Role	Platform	Ref.
2024	Nagendran's Honeymoons	Nagendran/Joseph/Ali Hussain/Govindan/Sukumaran	Disney+ Hotstar	

== Discography ==
Year	Song	Film	Composer	Ref.
2018	"Kannane Kannalane"	Neerali	Stephen Devassy	
2018	"Ente Shivane"	Kuttanpillayude Sivarathri	Sayanora Philip	
