= Kerala State Film Award for Best Comedian =

Annual Indian film award

The Kerala State Film Award for Best Comedy Artist used to be presented annually at the Kerala State Film Awards. Instituted in 1972, the award was discontinued in 2013.

== Winners ==
Year	Actor	Film	Director
1969	Adoor Bhasi	Adimakal, Virunnukari	
1970	Bahadoor	Thurakkatha Vathil, Aranazhika Neram, Vazhve Mayam	
1971	Adoor Bhasi		
1972	Bahadoor		
2008	Mamukoya	Innathe Chintha Vishayam	Sathyan Anthikkad
2009	Suraj Venjaramood	Ivar Vivahitharayal	Saji Surendran
2010	Suraj Venjaramood	Oru Naal Varum	T. K. Rajeev Kumar
2011	Jagathy Sreekumar	Swapna Sanchari	Kamal
2012	Salim Kumar	Ayalum Njanum Thammil	Lal Jose
2013	Suraj Venjaramood	Daivathinte Swantham Cleetus, Pullipulikalum Aattinkuttiyum	Marthandan, Lal Jose
