= Ee Pattanathil Bhootham =

- Theatrical poster
- Directed by: Johny Antony
- Written by: Udayakrishna; Siby K. Thomas
- Produced by: Arul Margkerette
- Starring: Mammootty; Kavya Madhavan; Innocent; Suraj Venjaramoodu; Salim Kumar; Rajan P. Dev
- Cinematography: Utpal V Nayanar
- Edited by: Ranjan Abraham
- Music by: Shaan Rahman
- Release date: 9 July 2009
- Running time: 150 minutes
- Country: India
- Language: Malayalam

Ee Pattanathil Bhootham (transl. Spirit in the city) is a 2009 Indian Malayalam-language fantasy action comedy film directed by Johnny Antony. It stars Mammootty in dual role with Kavya Madhavan, Innocent, Suraj Venjaramoodu, Salim Kumar, Rajan P. Dev and Janardhanan in supporting roles. The film is not based on the 1967 film Pattanathil Bhootham. The film was later dubbed in Hindi as Hamara Dost Bhoot Uncle.

== Plot ==
The film opens with a 'Mantravaadi' telling an evil magician, Sathyatheerdhan, to obey his commands to make money by asking a friendly ghost to commit crimes. Meanwhile, a group of kids and their benefactors are held hostage in a circus camp by the baddies who have taken over the show.

Ancy comes back from London to take charge of Jumbo circus which was founded by her father, Philipose, who is found murdered. Upon reaching there, she is told that her father was killed by a bike jumper named Jimmy. In fact, Jimmy, his foster father Krishnan, Sishu Palan, and a gang of street children were all invited by Philipose to join his circus. Meanwhile, the ghost appears, becomes friendly with the kids, and takes a more stylish shape of Jimmy. With the help of the ghost, Krishnan and the children tell Ancy that Jimmy is innocent in the whole issue. Realizing the truth, she joins Krishnan and helps them to prove Jimmy's innocence. In the climax, it was revealed that Korah killed Philipose to grab the circus. Korah and his men get arrested and Sathyatheerthan is turned into a hippopotamus.

== Cast ==
- Mammootty in a dual role as:
  - Jimmy
  - Bhootham (Spirit)
- Innocent as Krishnan / Krishnettan
- Kavya Madhavan as Ancy Philipose (voice by Vimmy Mariam George)
- Suraj Venjarammood as Sisupalan
- Salim Kumar as SI Madhavan Chandrappinni (Parakkum Madhavan)
- Guinness Pakru as Balan
- Rajan P Dev as Adv. Korah
- Mahadevan as Manthravadi Sathyatheerdhan / Raghavendran
- Janardhanan as Philipose
- Suresh Krishna as Robins/Fake Philipose
- Spadikam George as P.R.O Ramanathan
- Vijayaraghavan as Jail Superintendent Neelakantan
- Cochin Haneefa as Jailer
- Kalabhavan Shajon as Constable Sahadevan
- Bindu Panicker as Susy
- Sajitha Betti as Rani
- Ramzan Muhammed as Kannan
- Nayanthara Chakravarthy as Ammukutty
- Bheeman Raghu as Abbas Khan, Circus master
- Abu Salim as Giri, Security Guard
- Sudheer Sukumaran as Babu, Gunda Leader
- M. B. Padmakumar as Teja
- Kollam Thulasi as Advocate Chandrasekharan
- Tini Tom as Hakkim, Circus Security
- Baburaj as Commissioner Isaac (Cameo appearance)
- Thilakan as Senior Manthravadi (Guest Appearance)
- Vimal Raj as Michael (cameo appearance)
- Nikitha rajesh as a child
- Baiju Ezhupunna as Jaffar (cameo appearance)
- Kollam Ajith as Micheal's henchman (cameo appearance)
- Harimurali
- Parvathy p nair
- Master Vivas
- Indian Pallassery
- Nayana Josan
- Raashik Ajmal

== Soundtrack ==
The film's soundtrack contains six songs, all composed by Shaan Rahman and lyrics by Gireesh Puthenchery.

| # | Title | Singer(s) |
|---|---|---|
| 1 | "Aaro Nilaavaay" | Vineeth Sreenivasan, Shweta Mohan |
| 2 | "Aaro Nilaavaay [Acoustic Guitar]" | Sumesh |
| 3 | "Adipoli Bhootham" | Divya S. Menon, Pradeep Palluruthy, Geethu Thulasi, Navin Prince, Noel Prince, V. Suha |
| 4 | "Maamarangale [D]" | Karthik, Sayanora Philip, Anakha Sadan |
| 5 | "Maamarangale [M]" | Vijay Yesudas |
| 6 | "Theme Music" | Shaan Rahman |
