= Savari (2018 film) =

- Theatrical release poster
- Directed by: Ashok Nair
- Screenplay by: Ashok Nair
- Starring: Suraj Venjaramoodu
- Cinematography: S B Prajith
- Music by: Justin Kalidas
- Production company: Opened Eyes CreationsRoyal Vision
- Release date: 20 July 2018
- Country: India
- Language: Malayalam

Savari is a 2018 Indian Malayalam-language comedy film written and directed by Ashok Nair. The film stars Suraj Venjaramoodu and Sunil Sukhada. It was produced under the banner of Opened Eyes CreationsRoyal Vision.

== Plot ==
The story begins with a man fondly known as Savaari (Suraj Venjaramoodu) waking up at dawn to start his day of menial work in Thrissur on his old rusty bicycle. On the first day of Thrissur Pooram, he fails to reach on time for the sample firecracker show as he was sent out of the city by one of the organizers of the Thrissur Pooram to buy watermelons. On the second day of the Pooram, his bicycle, that he is very attached to, is stolen. He goes around asking people he works for/ knows for help but no one cares. While he is waiting outside the police station, a local thief asks the inspector why Savaari is sad. After knowing that he is the cause for Savaari's sorrow, he returns the bicycle. Savaari continues his day as usual. An organisation for Autistic children has raised enough funds for a school and has invited its contributors and actor Dileep for the inauguration ceremony. During the event, people present are made aware of the contributions of Savaari for the betterment of the children.

== Cast ==
- Suraj Venjaramoodu as Savari
- Dileep as himself (Special Appearance)
- Sunil Sukhada as Job
- Jayaraj Varier as Venu Menon
- Harisanth as Ashokan
- Chembil Ashokan as Varghese
- Shivaji Guruvayoor as Unni Menon
- Rajeev as Rajeev
- Praveena as Nirmala Teacher
- Nandakishor Nellickal as Gopi
- V. K. Baiju as Police Inspector

== Release ==
Savaari was released on 20 July 2018.
