= Husbands in Goa =

- Theatrical poster
- Directed by: Saji Surendran
- Written by: Krishna Poojapura
- Produced by: Ronnie Screwvala; Siddharth Roy Kapur
- Starring: Jayasurya; Indrajith; Asif Ali; Lal; Rima Kallingal; Bhama; Remya Nambeesan; Praveena
- Cinematography: Anil Nair
- Edited by: Manoj
- Music by: M. G. Sreekumar
- Production company: UTV Motion Pictures
- Distributed by: PJ Entertainments
- Release date: 21 September 2012
- Running time: 150 minutes
- Country: India
- Language: Malayalam

Husbands in Goa is a 2012 Indian Malayalam comedy film directed by Saji Surendran and written by Krishna Poojapura, starring Jayasurya, Indrajith, Asif Ali, Lal, Rima Kallingal, Bhama, Remya Nambeesan and Praveena.

The film follows the journey of three young men, who flee from their wives, for a vacation to the international tourist-destination Goa. During the trip, they become friends with an immature youthful older man, who is on the verge of a divorce. The film explores their time in Goa, the people they meet and a turn of events occur when they encounter their wives. The film is the second production of UTV Motion Pictures in Malayalam cinema. It features music composed by M. G. Sreekumar, whilst cinematography is handled by Anil Nair and is edited by Manoj. The film's plot was heavily inspired by the 2004 Hindi film Masti.

== Plot ==
Four husbands Govind, Jerry, Arjun and Sunny are on a trip to Goa to take a break from their messy married lives with their dominating wives Teena, Abhirami, Veena and Aanie. During the trip, they meet a husband Sunny who is on the verge of a divorce, which becomes a turning point in their lives. Their vacation in Goa, how they hook up with three young ladies and how their wives come to know about it, forms the rest of the movie.In the climax, it is revealed that the events depicted throughout the film were in fact part of a film shoot, reframing the entire narrative as a staged production.

== Cast ==
- Jayasurya as Murali Govind, a chartered accountant
- Indrajith Sukumaran as Advocate Jerry Thomas, a family lawyer
- Asif Ali as Arjun, an interior designer
- Lal as Sunny Abraham, a film cinematographer
- Bhama as Abhirami, Govind's wife
- Rima Kallingal as Teena, Jerry's wife
- Remya Nambeesan as Veena, Arjun's wife
- Praveena as Annie, Sunny's estranged wife
- Kalabhavan Mani as Imran Khalid, a police officer
- Innocent as Narayana Nadar (TTE) (Character from the movie No.20 Madras Mail)
- Amaeya Sivadas
- Suraj Venjaramoodu as Vasu Kollanjampally (Vasco)
- Sarayu Mohan as Saniya
- Divya Padmini as Rita
- Unni Maya as Jessica
- Leena Maria Paul as Jennifer
- Noby Marcose
- Nelson Sooranadu as a waiter in a hotel

=== Archive footage cameos from No.20 Madras Mail ===
- Mohanlal as Tony Kurishingal
- Mammooty as himself

Actor Innocent reprises his role as Nadar (TTE) from the 1990 movie No.20 Madras Mail. Events of the movie are briefly referenced. The song "Pichakappoonkaavukal" from the movie is also reused.

== Production ==
=== Development ===
Even before the release of his fourth directorial venture Kunjaliyan, director Saji Surendran mentioned that he was going to direct his next project very soon: Husbands in Goa. He also revealed that it would be produced by the famous production company UTV Motion Pictures. The film was known to be the sequel of Happy Husbands but the director said himself this is not a sequel but a similar fun-filled film. It had been announced that the film will be produced by UTV Motion Pictures because the production company wanted to expand and produce a second well made film in Malayalam after Grandmaster.

=== Casting ===
The director had announced that Jayasurya, Indrajith and Asif Ali will be the official confirmed cast. Biju Menon was originally chosen to play Lal role, but couldn't because of a date-clash. Also Bhavana, and Samvritha Sunil were announced to be part of the cast, but could not do so because of a date-clash. Then they had later decided to cast Bhama, Rima Kallingal, Remya Nambeesan and Praveena to play the wives. Newcomers, Leena Maria and Sarayu were chosen to play the girls that distract the husbands.

== Critical reception ==
The movie opened to positive and mixed response from both critics and audiences. Theatre Balcony gave an overall rating of 66% and praised the comedy scenes and the performances while disliking the not so engaging story and script. Metromatinee gave a positive review and said " If you are one of those who watch mimicry and comedy shows on TV, this movie will help you relive those moments that you spent in front of TV." The Times of India rated 3 stars out of 5. But added that "The film evokes hilarity, but the humour fails to generate the rip-roaring laugh one associates with a comedy." Kerala Films welcomed the movie giving 2.5 stars out of 5 and said "Husbands in Goa really deserves a one time watch, especially for the exceptional lead performances, great comedy scenes, racy direction, and the song 'Pichakal poomkavukal'." Critics have noted actor Jayasurya's performance to be the best, also stating he is the show stealer in the film because of him having perfect comic timing and getting many positive replies from audiences. However, the film also got some negative reviews from the critics. Sify gave a negative review and gave 2 stars out of 5 and added "You need real skills to find humour in Husbands in Goa. Go for this one, if you are ready to take such pains." Paresh C Palicha of Rediff.com said that "Husbands in Goa is a typical 'husbands escaping from their wives' attempt at comedy which elicits a few laughs".

== Box office ==
The film collected US$10,135 from UK box office.

== Soundtrack ==
Husbands in Goa

Soundtrack album by M G Sreekumar
- Released: 25 August 2012
- Recorded: Kodandapani Studio, Chennai
- Genre: Film soundtrack
- Length: 16:41
- Label: Satyam Audios

The soundtrack features four songs composed by M. G. Sreekumar with lyrics by Shibu Chakravarthy and Rajeev Alunkal. The songs had nothing much to offer but the remake song "Pichaka Poonkavukal" that was a part of Joshiy's No.20 Madras Mail, rocked the charts.

Track #	Song	Singer(s)	Duration	Remarks
1	"Pichakapoo"	M G Sreekumar	3:43	
2	"Neela Neela"	Alex Kayyalakkakom, Sudeep Kumar	4:29	
3	"Mounam"	Najim Arshad, Rimi Tomy	4:50	
4	"Husbands in Goa"	George Peter	3:29	
