= Sajitha Betti =

Indian actress

- Other name: Sajitha Shamaas
- Occupation: Actress
- Years active: 1992–2017, 2023- Present
- Spouse: Shamaas (m.2014)
- Children: Izzah Fathima

Sajitha Betti is an Indian actress known for her works in Malayalam television serials and films.

== Biography ==
Sajitha Betti belongs to a community of Urdu-speaking Muslims from Hyderabad. She is married to Shamas. She has two elder brothers and two sisters; Wahida Betti, Mothilal, Sahida Betti, and Heeralal. She married Shamas on 12 August 2012. She has featured in many albums and advertisements. Her daughter Ezzah Fathima Shamas is well known for her debut role of Devutty in Santhwanam. Ezzah is currently working in Chandrikayilaliyunna Chandrakantham where Sajitha Betti also playing a lead role.

== Filmography ==
=== Film ===
List of Sajitha Betti film credits
Year	Title	Role	Notes
1992	Mr & Mrs		Child Artist
1998	Harikrishnans	Nisha	Child Artist
1998	Achaammakkuttiyude Achaayan	Alice's daughter	Child Artist
1998	Ayushman Bhava	Priya	Child Artist
1998	Sreekrishnapurathe Nakshathrathilakkam	Kalyani	Child Artist
1999	Olympiyan Anthony Adam	Student	Child Artist
1999	Ustaad	Kshama's friend	Child Artist
2000	Melevaryathe Malakhakkuttikal	Malavika	
2000	Thenkasipattanam	Meenakshi's friend	Child Artist
2001	Goa	Rosy	
2002	Kayamkulam Kanaran	Sreekutty	
2002	Oomappenninu Uriyadappayyan	Mooppan's adopted daughter	
2003	The Fire	Sindhu	
2006	Red Salute	Dancer	
2006	Chacko Randaaman	Alice Johnykutty	
2007	Nadiya Kollappetta Rathri	Dr. Mathangi Varma	
2007	November Rain	Achu	
2007	Virus	Annmary Kuruvila	
2007	Black Cat	Shyama	
2008	Ini Varum Kaalam	Aarthi	Tamil film
2008	College Kumaran	Shalini	
2009	Ee Pattanathil Bhootham	Rani	
2009	Dairy	Mona	Telugu film
2009	Sanmanassullavan Appukuttan	Rekha	
2009	Swantham Lekhakan	TV Star	Cameo
2009	Srisailam	Neelima Benigar	Telugu film
2010	Marykkundoru Kunjaadu	Selina	
2010	Thaskara Lahala	Shobana	
2010	Adipoli Sulthan	Ammukuttty	
2011	Ulakam Chuttum Valiban	Dhatan's wife	
2011	Seniors	Rex's mother	
2012	Chettayees	Gracy	
2012	Thappana	Nirmala	
2012	Mr. Marumakan	K.V. Bhavana	
2012	Veendum Kannur	Tara	
2012	Oru Kudumba Chithram	Nithya	
2012	Mayamohini	Shanthi	
2012	Padmasree Bharat Dr. Saroj Kumar	Neelima's friend	
2014	Ring Master	Nandhini	
2014	Villali Veeran	Aruna	
2014	Praise The Lord	Kochurani	
2015	Two Countries	Reshmi	
2015	My Dear Mythri	Prathapan's wife	
2016	Shikhamani	Bus passenger	
2017	Mithram	Seethalakshmi	Short film
2018	Mutalaq	Rukhiya Sahib	
2022	Kaypakka	Kalyani	

== Television ==
List of Sajitha Betti television serial credits
Year	Title	Role	Channel	Notes
1992	Telefilm as Thesni Khan's daughter			Television movie
	Samayam			Tamil serial
	Snehitha		DD Malayalam	
2000–2001	Sthree		Asianet	Debut
2003–2004	Swantham	Emily Thomas	Asianet	
2003–2004	Aalippazham	Minukutty	Surya TV	
2004	Kadamattathu Kathanar	Gouri/Yakshi	Asianet	
2004	Veendum Jwalayayi	Selina	DD Malayalam	
2004–2006	Kaavyanjali	Kavya	Surya TV	remake of Hindi TV Series Kundali
2005	Ee Thanalil		Surya TV	
2005	Kayamkulam Kochunni		Surya TV	
2005	Nagarathil Yakshi	Ghost	Surya TV	
2005	Sindoorarekha		Asianet	
2005–2006	Thulabharam	Ganga	Surya TV	
2005–2006	Priyam	Aruna	Kairali TV	
2006	Revathymandiram		DD Malayalam	
2006	Thalolam		Asianet	
2006	Thanichu		Asianet	
2007–2008	Nombarappoovu	Devika	Asianet	
2007	Sree Ayyappanum Vavarum	Yuvarani	Surya TV	
2007	Priyamanasi		Surya TV	
2009	Mayavi		Surya TV	
2009	Vigraham		Asianet	
2009	Adiparasakthi	Arundhati Kumari	Surya TV	
2009–2010	Kathaparayum Kavyanjali	Anjali	Surya TV	sequel to Kavyanjali
2010–2011	Snehatheeram	Anuradha IPS	Surya TV	
2010–2011	Alaudinte Albuthavilakku	Kavitha/Laila Rajakumari/Raziya	Asianet	
2011–2013	Ammakkili	Isabella	Asianet	Nominated: Asianet Television award 2013 – Best actress in a negative role
2011	Kadamattathachan	Neeli	Surya TV	
2013–2014	Ponnu Poloru Pennu	Abhirami	Amrita TV	
2013	Geethanjali	Sethulakshmi	Surya TV	
2013	Nirakoottu	Herself	Kairali TV	Cameo appearance in promo
2014	Avalude Katha		Surya TV	
2014–2015	Ente Pennu	Rukmini Emmanuel Eshow	Mazhavil Manorama	
2014–2015	Balaganapathy	Radhika Varma	Asianet	Nominated: Asianet Television award 2015 – Best actress in a negative role
2014–2015	Snehajaalakam	Aparana Harishankar	Surya TV	
2016–2017	Ottachilambu	Anna Rose	Mazhavil Manorama	
2017	Aparachitha	Sivaranjini IPS	Amrita TV	
2017	Seetha	Adv. Fathima Beevi	Flowers TV	
2023–2024	Uppum Mulakum Season 2	Valiyaveettil Haimavathy	Flowers TV	
2023-2025	Chandrikayilaliyunna Chandrakantham	Lakshmi	Asianet	
2024	Home	Mayavathi	Flowers TV	
2024	Ladies Room	Annie	Kaumudy TV	

As Host

- Patturumaal season 8 (Kairali TV)
- Meharuba (JaiHind TV)
- Super Chef (Asianet Plus) as guest/presenter
- Ruchibedam (ACV) as guest

Other shows

- Celebrity Kitchen Magic (Kairali) as a contestant
- Don't Do Don't Do (Asianet plus) as a participant
- Onnum Onnum Moonu (Mazhavil) as guest
- Ividingananu Bhai (Mazhavil) as guest
- Super Star (Amrita) as guest
- Veettamma (Kairali) as guest
- Patturumal (Kairali) as special performer
- Ningalkkariyamo (Surya TV) as guest
- Sarigama (Asianet) as guest
- Manassiloru Mazhavillu (Kairali) as guest
- Coat Eeswaran (Surya TV) as guest
- Comedy Stars (Asianet) as guest
- Comedy Express (Asianet) as special judge
- Asianet Television Awards (Asianet) as Dancer
- Humorous Talk Show (Asianet Plus) as guest
- Surya Challenge (Surya TV) as guest
- Surya Music (Surya Music) as guest
- Dhwani Tarang (Kairali TV) as Performer
- Ishal Nilavu (Kairali TV) as Performer
- Hundred Days of Keerthi Chakra (Asianet) as Performer
- Film Box (Kaumudy) as guest

== Albums ==
- Hello Marhaba
- Friends
- Dost & Dost
- Sarvamangale
- Avalum Njanum
- Manikiakkallu

== Advertisements ==
- Asian Wood Palace
- Arafa Gold
- Data Lucky Center
- Arabian Jewellers
- Atlas Jewellery
- Arafa Jewellery
- Golden Couple
- GITD
- Aster
- Manorama Magazine
- Oren Kitchen World
- Viva Wedding Palace
- EMKE Silks
