= Oru Naal Varum =

- Theatrical release poster
- Directed by: T. K. Rajeev Kumar
- Written by: Sreenivasan
- Produced by: Maniyanpilla Raju
- Starring: Mohanlal; Sreenivasan; Sameera Reddy; Devayani; Esther Anil; Nazriya Nazim
- Cinematography: Manoj Pillai
- Edited by: B. Ajithkumar
- Music by: M. G. Sreekumar
- Production company: Maniyanpilla Raju Productions
- Distributed by: Damor Cinema
- Release date: 9 July 2010
- Running time: 144 minutes
- Country: India
- Language: Malayalam
- Budget: ₹4.35 crore

Oru Naal Varum (transl. A Day Will Come) is a 2010 Indian Malayalam-language satirical film directed by T. K. Rajeev Kumar, written by Sreenivasan, and produced by Maniyanpilla Raju. It stars Mohanlal and Sameera Reddy in her Malayalam debut, with Sreenivasan, Devayani, Nazriya Nazim, and Esther Anil in supporting roles. The film's soundtrack was composed by M. G. Sreekumar. Oru Naal Varum was released on 9 July 2010. The plot deals with corruption in India.

== Plot ==
Gopi Krishnan, his wife, Rajalakshmi, and daughter, Dhanya, are enjoying their moments at Kutralam Waterfalls. Soon it is revealed that Gopi Krishnan is a corrupt assistant town planner using a government vehicle to come on holiday in Tamil Nadu during his duty hours. As his driver takes him back to his station in Kerala, he has an altercation with Sukumaran whose identity and profession are not yet revealed.

Sukumaran lives in a rented flat with his daughter. There is also a subplot involving the child custody battle between Nandhakumar and his wife, Meera. Later, Sukumaran is seen at the town planning office trying to get a building permit, and meets Vasudevan, who is also having difficulty with building permits. In reality, Sukumaran is in disguise and is actually a vigilance officer named Nandhakumar trying to arrest Gopi Krishnan in a corruption case.

Nandhakumar makes three attempts to get evidence against Gopi Krishnan. The first two failed because Nandhakumar's subordinate, Sunny, leaked the plans to Gopi Krishnan. Vasudevan commits suicide after the first failure. Finally, after catching Sunny, the third attempt succeeds, though there is confusion over the evidence, and some thugs attempt to murder Gopi Krishnan while he is in police custody.

However, Nandhakumar loses his court case against his wife and has to give up his daughter. Faced with the collapse of his corrupt life, Gopi Krishnan agrees to work with Nandhakumar to root out corrupt real estate developers. Meera returns Nandhakumar's daughter to him, saying that she could not handle her crying for her father all the time.

== Cast ==
- Mohanlal as Kulappulli Sukumaran / Vigilance DySP Nandhakumar
- Sreenivasan as ATPO Gopi Krishnan
- Sameera Reddy as Meera, Nandakumar's wife
- Devayani as Rajalekshmi, Gopikrishnan's wife
- Suraj Venjaramoodu as Driver Girijan
- Nazriya Nazim as Dhanya Gopi Krishnan
- Esther Anil as Anu, Nandhakumar's daughter
- Nedumudi Venu as Havildar Vasudevan (Retd)
- Lalu Alex as Vinod Abraham, Vigilance SP
- Siddique as K.N.C
- Maniyanpilla Raju as Ramesh
- Ambika Mohan as Family Court Judge
- Aliyar as George Sebastian, Advocate of Nandhakumar
- T. P. Madhavan
- Kottayam Nazir
- Chembil Ashokan
- Fathima Babu
- Indrans
- Jayakrishnan as Advocate Santhosh
- Biju Pappan as Vigilance SI Mukundan
- Dinesh Panicker as Vigilance CI Ravi
- Nimisha Unnikrishnan as Vasudevan's Daughter

== Production ==
The film was produced by Maniyanpilla Raju under the company Maniyanpilla Raju Productions. Including print and publicity, the film costs around ₹4.35 crore to make. Oru Naal Varum was the maiden film of Sameera Reddy in the Malayalam cinema.

== Soundtrack ==
No.	Title	Artist(s)	Length
1.	"Padan Ninakkoru"	M. G. Sreekumar, K. S. Chithra
2.	"Oru Kandan Poocha Varunne"	Vidhu Prathap
3.	"Maavin Chottile Manamulla"	Shweta Mohan
4.	"Naathoone Naathoone"	Mohanlal, Rimi Tomy
5.	"Padan Ninakkoru" (Female)	K. S. Chithra
6.	"Pranaya Nilavite"	K. K. Nishad, Preethi Warrier
7.	"Maavin Chottile Manamulla"	M. G. Sreekumar

The film features songs composed by M. G. Sreekumar, with lyrics by Murukan Kattakada .

== Release ==
The film was originally planned to be released on 7 May 2010 and was censored by the Central Board of Film Certification on 7 April 2010. But it was delayed by two months due to a strike in the Malayalam film industry. The film was released on 9 July 2010.

=== Reception ===
The Indian Express wrote that "the plot is well-constructed and the element of satire well worked out. The film retains the interest of the audience till the end". Sify called the film "above average" and said: "Oru Naal Varum handles a relevant issue, but the problem here is the way it has been told. Of course, even in its current shape, the film is really good when compared to the rest of the movies that are being churned out in Malayalam these days". Rediff.com rated 2 out of 5 and stated that "The first half works wonderfully due to the presence of a lively and humorous Mohanlal. Sadly, he transforms into somebody else just before intermission: as if to do justice to his superstar image ... Oru Naal Varum may be a well intended social satire but it ends up as a conundrum".

== Awards ==
Kerala State Film Awards

- Best Comedy Artist – Suraj Venjaramood

Asianet Film Awards

- Best Lyricist - Murukan Kattakada
- Best Music Director - M. G. Sreekumar

Asiavision Awards

- Best Socially Committed Movie
- Best Music Director - M. G. Sreekumar

Jaihind TV Film Awards

- Best Music Director - M. G. Sreekumar
- Best Female Playback Singer - Shweta Mohan
- Best Comedy Artist - Suraj Venjaramood
