= Thaskara Lahala =

- Directed by: Ramesh Das
- Written by: T. V. Balakrishnan
- Produced by: Azeez Kadalundi, Raji. P. K. Kollam
- Starring: Suraj Venjaramood; Salim Kumar; Bheeman Raghu; Lakshmi Sharma; Joby Johny
- Cinematography: Anandakuttan
- Music by: Shyam Dharman
- Distributed by: Beeyem Release
- Release date: 30 July 2010
- Country: India
- Language: Malayalam

Thaskara Lahala (English: Rebellion of the thief) is a 2010 Indian Malayalam-language comedy film directed by Ramesh Das, starring Suraj Venjaramood. This is the director's second film after Thattakam and his second collaboration with Suraj Venjaramood in the lead role. It co-stars Lakshmi Sharma, who plays the role of a police officer.

== Cast ==
- Suraj Venjaramood as Manikantan
- Salim Kumar as Ayyappan
- Bheeman Raghu as DYSP Idiyan George
- Jaffar Idukki as Maimunni
- Nelson Sooranad as Perunkulam Biju
- Mamukkoya as Kummankandathu Muhammed Haji
- Joby Johny as Antony Pallan
- P. Sreekumar as Peter Louis
- Lakshmi Sharma as SI Varsha
- Thesni Khan as PC Jameela
- Subi Suresh as SI Shalini
- Geetha Vijayan as SI Pooja
- Shivaji Guruvayoor as Home Minister Divakaran Menon
- Meghanathan as Madhavji
- Chembil Ashokan as R.K. Nair
- Sajitha Betti as CI Shobana
- Narayanankutty
- Sinjili
- Kulappulli Leela
- Thara Kalyan
- Manka Mahesh
- Santhakumari
- Valsala Menon as Annie Vincent
- Deepika Mohan
- Bindu Varappuzha
- Denise Sofia (Foreign Buyer - European)
- Santiago Torres Flores (Foreign Buyer - Colombian)
