= Padmasree Bharat Dr. Saroj Kumar =

- Theatrical release poster
- Directed by: Sajin Raaghavan
- Written by: Sreenivasan
- Produced by: Vaishaka Rajan
- Starring: Sreenivasan; Vineeth Sreenivasan; Fahadh Faasil
- Cinematography: S. Kumar
- Edited by: Kevin Thomas
- Music by: Deepak Dev; Bijibal (score)
- Distributed by: Vaishaka Cinema; PJ Entertainments; (UK)
- Release date: 14 January 2012
- Running time: 147 minutes
- Country: India
- Language: Malayalam

Padmasree Bharat Dr. Saroj Kumar is a 2012 Indian Malayalam-language satirical parody film directed by Sajin Raghavan in his directorial debut. The film stars Sreenivasan as the titular superstar with Vineeth Sreenivasan, Fahadh Faasil, Jagathy Sreekumar, Suraj Venjaramoodu, and Mukesh. It is a spin-off of the popular 2005 film Udayananu Tharam. Sreenivasan reprises the original role of Saroj Kumar. The director announced this is not a sequel, and that only some characters from Udayananu Tharam were used. In the film, renowned actor Saroj Kumar is ousted from his film following a quarrel with a co-actor. He then goes on to try many tricks to sabotage the project but fails when the movie becomes a success.

The film was shot mainly in Chennai and Kochi.

== Synopsis ==
Saroj Kumar is a renowned South Indian actor who lost his fandom and successful films due to his arrogance and vanity. His latest films like Vekkada Vedi, turn into a flop due to his over-heroic performance and lack of story. He gets the rank of Colonel in the Army and brags about it. Alex Samuel and Pachalam Bhasi start their new film with Shyam, a debutant actor who played junior artist roles. Meanwhile, Saroj bribes the film associations and gets Samuel's and Pachalam's film banned. Meanwhile, Babykuttan, another producer, helps Alex and Pachalam to resume their project. Saroj Kumar tries to cancel the film in many ways but it is completed and is well received by the audience.

Meanwhile, the income tax department raids his premises and starts prosecution proceedings for tax evasion. How Saroj is tense about the matter, drinks a lot, and acts differently form the rest of the plot.

== Cast ==
- Sreenivasan as Megastar Padmasree Bharat Dr Saroj Kumar (Thengumoodu Rajappan)
- Vineeth Sreenivasan as Shyam
- Fahadh Faasil as Alex Samuel
- Mukesh as Babykuttan
- Jagathy Sreekumar as Pachalam Bhasi
- Suraj Venjarammoodu as Muttathara Babu
- Salim Kumar as Rafeeq
- Mamta Mohandas as Neelima, Saroj's second wife
- Manikuttan as Rajesh
- Manikandan Pattambi as Journalist Anilkumar
- Subi Suresh as Reporter Poomanthali Susheela
- Kollam Thulasi as Wilson, Union Leader
- Liimal G Padath as Zachariah, Alex's Assistant
- Apoorva Bose as Lekha, Shyam's love interest
- Saju Attingal as SI Ram Kumar
- Sunil Sukhada as Kadalundi Madhavan
- Ponnamma Babu as Geetha, Neelima's friend
- Sajitha Betti as Vidya, Neelima's friend
- Lishoy as Chandradas, Income Tax Department officer
- Shari as Lakshmi, Shyam's mother and Saroj's first wife
- Pradeep Kottayam as Eureka TV Assistant
- Manoj Kumar as Shyam's neighbour
- Munshi Venu as Shyam's native
- Harikrishna Menon as Shyam's local friend
- Vishnu as Shyam's local friend
- Vijayan Peringode as the physician
- Cherthala Lalitha as Shyam's neighbour
- Deepika Mohan as Servant
- Sandhya (special appearance)
- Meera Nandan (special appearance)
- Sarayu (special appearance)
- Roopa (special appearance)
- Nimisha Suresh (special appearance)

== Production ==
About the idea of making Padmasree Bharat Dr. Saroj Kumar, Sreenivasan says: "The thought of the film came to us when we started thinking about what should be happening to a superstar like Saroj Kumar at this point in time. He is getting old and the most challenging aspect about stardom is that once you have got it, the next question is how long it will last."

== Soundtrack ==
Music: Deepak Dev, Lyrics: Kaithapram Damodaran Namboothiri

No.	Title	Singer(s)	Length
1.	"Mozhikalum"	Haricharan, Manjari
2.	"Iniyoru Chalanam"	Shaan Rahman, Vineeth Sreenivasan
3.	"Kesu"	Vineeth Sreenivasan, Shweta Mohan
4.	"Mozhikalum"	Haricharan

== Reception ==
=== Critical reception ===
The film was released on 14 January 2012 to mainly mixed reviews from critics, although, the comedy scenes received praise. Paresh C. Palicha of Rediff.com concluded his review saying, "On the whole, Padmasree Bharat Dr. Saroj Kumar is disappointing, to say the least." Hari Prasad of Yentha.com said that "the film, despite having a good theme, suffers from a messy script." Sify.com."
