= Drama (2018 film) =

- Theatrical release poster
- Directed by: Ranjith
- Written by: Ranjith
- Produced by: M. K. Nassar; Maha Subair
- Starring: Mohanlal; Arundathi Nag; Asha Sarath
- Cinematography: Alagappan N.
- Edited by: Sandeep Nandakumar
- Music by: Bijibal; Vinu Thomas
- Production companies: Varnachithra Goodline Productions; Lilypad Motion Pictures UK
- Distributed by: Goodline Release
- Release date: 7 November 2018 (Kerala)
- Running time: 146 minutes
- Country: India
- Language: Malayalam

Drama is a 2018 Indian Malayalam-language comedy drama film written and directed by Ranjith. The cast was led by Mohanlal, Arundathi Nag, and Asha Sharath, while Kaniha, Shyamaprasad, Subi Suresh, Suresh Krishna, Tini Tom, Niranj S., Johny Antony, Dileesh Pothan, Baiju Santhosh, Shaalin Zoya, and Renji Panicker played supporting roles. The background score of the film was composed by Bijibal, and Vinu Thomas composed a song. Alagappan N. was in charge of the cinematography.

The story is set in a suburb of London. Principal photography took place in May and June 2018 in Ashtead and its neighbourhoods in England. Additional scenes were shot in Kerala and Dubai in July and September. The film released in Kerala on 7 November 2018 coinciding with Deepavali.

== Plot ==
Rosamma John Chacko is a widowed mother who has five children Ammini, Philip, Benny, Mercy and Jomon. She moves to London with Mercy from her hometown Kattappana. Mercy is a doctor who lives with her husband Dr. Mukundanunni and her two children. Two weeks after Rosamma comes to London, she dies in sleep. Mercy informs her siblings Ammini, the eldest, a nurse who lives in Canada with her husband Anto and her kids; businessman Philip who lives in America with his family; businessman Benny who lives in Australia with his family; and Jomon who lives and is looking for a job in Dubai.

Philip tells Mukundan than they can share the expense of the funeral. Ammini requests Mercy not to take the body to the mortuary. Mukundan's mother also tells him the body should not be kept in the home for too many days. Mukundan contacts a funeral agency run by Dixon Lopez partnered with Rajagopal. Mukundan requests that they find another home or place to keep the body. Eventually, they rent a house for 10 days and takes the body there.

When Mercy's siblings arrive, Dixon and Raju explains their matters and rate. Mukundan agrees to pay the advance and is ready to sign the agreement. The youngest Jomon opposes their decision. He says their mother's last wish was that the funeral must take place in Kattappana beside their late father John Cacko. His siblings except Mercy to oppose his request. An angered Jomon leaves the place and resides in a lodge.

Raju reaches the house where the body is kept. Their worker Podiyan leaves for an emergency. He drinks vodka and hallucinates that Rosamma is talking to him. She asks him about his family. Raju tells her that his wife Rekha shut him out of their house because she found out he was sex talking with her friend. Rosamma tells Raju about her last wish to be buried in Kattappana and asks him to help Jomon make the wish fulfilled and to think of her as his mother, and then all his problems will be solved by God.

Raju decides to help Jomon, but all his efforts were wasted. At last, he gets a call from Kunjachayan, his friend and a political leader, who agrees to help him. He contacts assistant engineer Balachandran at Kottayam Municipality. Balachandran makes a surprise inspection at the shopping complex that is being constructed by Philip and Benny and gives a stop memo. Philip and Benny are informed of this news by their contractor and told that they should appear before the chairman within two days. Philip and Benny contact Dixon and inform him that they decided to bury their mother in Kattappana. Dixon then demands the balance amount and they can take the body.

They eventually agree to bury the body in London in the morning and leave to Kottayam an afternoon flight. In the meantime, Raju and Jomon forcefully take the body from the rented house to Raju and Rekha's house. Eventually, Rekha understands Raju and forgives him. A flustered Dixon informs the family that the funeral will not happen before 4 PM on the determined day. Philip and Benny decide to leave without attending the funeral. After they leave, Jomon comes and tells the rest that he and Raju did all of this to make their mother's last wish to come true.

He invites Mercy and Mukundan to accompany him. He says that Rosamma has given the house in his name and rips up the document in front of them. He said he is ready to give the house to Ammini if she wants to come. Ammini tearfully agrees to accompany him and they bury Rosamma's body besides their father's catacomb. Raju and Rekha also visit the catacomb. Later, Kunjachayan informs Raju that they lied to Balachandran, but there are real problems in the building's construction.

== Cast ==
- Mohanlal as Rajagopal Narayanan "Raju"
- Arundathi Nag as Rosamma John Chacko
- Asha Sarath as Rekha
- Kaniha as Mercy John Chacko (Kunjumol)
- Shyamaprasad as Dr. Mukundanunni
- Subi Suresh as Ammini John Chacko
- Suresh Krishna as Philip John Chacko "Monichan"
- Tini Tom as Benny John Chacko "Bennichan"
- Niranj S. as Jomon John Chacko
- Johny Antony as Anto
- Dileesh Pothan as Dixon Lopez
- Baiju Santhosh as Sindhukumar "Podiyan"
- Shaalin Zoya as Jessy
- Renji Panicker as MLA Thomas Mathew "Kunjachayan"
- Thilakan as John Chacko (photo archive)
- Sreedevi Unni as Mukundan's mother
- Joy Badlani as Arjun Kulkarni
- Harish Nair as Harry, Rajagopal's assistant
- Jaffar Idukki as Mathukutty
- Jayaraj Warrier as Balachandran
- Baby Lara as Mercy's daughter
- Master Milan as Mercy's son

== Production ==
=== Filming ===
The film began principal photography on 14 May 2018 in London. On the first day of the shoot, Mohanlal, Baiju Santhosh, Tini Tom, Shyamaprasad, Murali Menon, Arundhathi Nag, Kaniha, and Shalin Zoya performed. Mohanlal had allotted 30 days dates for filming. The film crew in England comprised around 60 personnel. For two weeks, the filming was scheduled at Ashtead and Epsom Downs in Surrey, and Maidstone in Kent. Filming was undertaken under the working title RIP. It was unlike the usual practice of Renjith, who name his films prior to filming. For Drama, it was decided two weeks into filming and was announced on 15 June accompanied by a poster. Director M. Padmakumar assisted Renjith in direction and took off after two weeks of filming to work on his new film Joseph; thenceforth, Johny Antony took over his place in addition to acting. Arun Narayanan and Renjith's son Agnivesh worked as assistant directors in the film. Alagappan N. was the cinematographer and actress Chinnu Kuruvilla worked as his main assistant. Bobby Kurian, who owns the company Lilypad Motion Pictures UK, was the film's executive producer in England.

The scene where Mohanlal and Asha Sarath ride a car was shot in front of the hotel Crowne Plaza Heathrow in West Drayton, where the film crew also lodged. Mazda Mount in Ashtead was the major filming area and a bungalow at the locale was set as Rajagopal's residence, where some of the combination scenes of Mohanlal and Asha was shot. The film's crucial scenes were filmed at a villa in Mazda Mount, which was set as the residence of husband and wife Dr. Mukundhanunni and Mercy. The film was mostly shot in locations away from Central London. It was also shot in Leatherhead and Heathrow Airport. A funeral scene was shot in Ashtead on 21 May. By the last weekend of May, the crew was shooting in Tonbridge, Maidstone, at a property named Rianos Wedding & Party Venue, which was transformed into Dixon Lopez funeral home, and filming also occurred outside Margaret Preedy Dance Studios at the same location. Filming in England was completed in 45 days, by late June. The entire story of Drama takes place within 5 days and 95 percent of the film was shot in England. Remaining scenes were shot in Kuttikkanam and Kozhikode in Kerala, India, in early July. Mohanlal, Nag, and Renji Panicker acted in this part. Later, filming was also held in Dubai, where it was wrapped on 24 September 2018.

=== Music ===
The background score of the film was composed by Bijibal. The film features the song, "Pandaraand", composed and arranged by Vinu Thomas, written by B. K. Harinarayanan and sung by Mohanlal. The song is around 3 minutes long and is distributed by the label Satyam Audios.

== Release ==
Drama released in Kerala on 1 November 2018 on the day of Kerala Piravi.
