= Marykkundoru Kunjaadu =

- Theatrical poster
- Directed by: Shafi
- Written by: Benny P Nayarambalam
- Produced by: Vaishakh Rajan
- Starring: Dileep; Biju Menon; Bhavana
- Cinematography: Shamdat Sainudeen
- Edited by: Manoj; Sangeeth Kollam
- Music by: Berny Ignatius
- Distributed by: Vysakh Cinemas & PJ Entertainments
- Release date: 25 December 2010
- Running time: 135 minutes
- Country: India
- Language: Malayalam
- Budget: ₹3.5 crore (US$360,000)
- Box office: ₹22.5 crore (US$2.3 million)

Marykkundoru Kunjaadu (transl. Mary Had a Little Lamb) is a 2010 Malayalam-language action romantic comedy film directed by Shafi, starring Dileep, Biju Menon and Bhavana in lead roles, with Vijayaraghavan, Vinaya Prasad, Jagathy Sreekumar and Innocent in supporting roles. The film was released on 25 December 2010 and received highly positive reviews, become a blockbuster after completing more than 150 days. The movie was remade in Hindi by Priyadarshan in 2012 as Kamaal Dhamaal Malamaal.

== Plot ==
The story takes place in a remote village in High Range, Kerala. Solomon, the son of the village sexton, Geevarghese, a simple soul who is quiet in nature and fears virtually everything around, thus earning the nickname Kunjaadu (little lamb). His mother, Mary, was Ittichan's crush. He named his daughter Mary after Solomon's mother. He wanted Solomon to love his daughter dearly and then he would marry her to some other person so that he gets to know the pain that he felt when he lost his love. He promises the church that he will give another cross made out of gold to the church if Solomon marries some other girl but if he wants to marry his daughter then Solomon must give a cross to church. Mary has been in love with Solomon right from their childhood days. Mary’s brothers however despise Solomon and they thrash him every chance they get since they vehemently oppose their sister’s relationship with him. Meanwhile, a man, who looks and behaves like a dreaded and terrorised criminal, comes to Solomon's house and Solomon, who is overjoyed at getting some fearless company, gets the man accepted by his whole family under the illusion that he is his long-lost brother Jose. He does so much for the family and gets involved in agriculture and develops the family's living. He even fights Mary’s brothers while they attack Solomon. Later, Solomon finds that there is more to his so called brother than he thought initially, and that he raped and killed a girl and was imprisoned for seven years. Solomon warns his family that even if he is their brother, they should be alert or else he'll burn down the house. His parents don't take it seriously but later when the family is away, Jose burns the house down and everyone thinks it is Solomon who did it. Unable to prove to his innocence and when everyone blames him, Solomon decides to commit suicide, but when he was about to do it, Jose comes there with his old friend and finds out that he burned the house to move Solomon's family. He also finds out that Jose has stolen the cross, hid it in Solomon's land seven years ago and has returned to retrieve it. Solomon and Jose learns that Jose's old friend, who also wants the golden cross, was the real person who killed the girl, who was actually Jose's lover. A fight occurs between Solomon, Jose and Jose's friend, where Jose's friend gets beaten up and subdued by Jose. The next morning, Solomon rings the church bell and tells that he got the cross and saves Jose by telling that he was the one who help him capture the thief as Solomon always considered him as a brother. Everyone is happy and Ittichan gives his daughter's hand to Solomon.

== Cast ==
- Dileep as M. G. Solomon (Kunjaadu)
  - Master Dhananjay as young Solomon
- Biju Menon as Jose (fake), Solomon's elder brother/ A thief who stole the cross
- Bhavana as Mary, Solomon's love interest
  - Nikitha Nair as young Mary
- Vijayaraghavan as Manimalayil Geevarghese, Solomon's father
- Vinaya Prasad as M. G. Mary (Marychedathy), Solomon's mother
- Jagathy Sreekumar as Fr. Joseph Kundukuzhy (Kundukuzhy Achan), the village priest
- Innocent as Alangad Ittichan, Mary's father
- Salim Kumar as Lolappan, the coffin dealer and Solomon's friend
- Renjusha Menon as Lolappan's wife
- Anand as Johnykutty, Mary's brother
- Appa Haja as Kunjachan, Mary's brother
- Kochu Preman as Charlie, Mary's uncle
- Saju Kodiyan as villager
- Sajitha Betti as Celine
- Sreelatha Namboothiri as Celine' s mother
- Nimisha Suresh as M. G. Sisily, Solomon's sister
- Jai as M.G. Seleena, Solomon's sister
- Ambika Mohan as Nancy, Mary's mother
- Ponnamma Babu as Chantha Maria
- Chali Pala as Thoma
- T. P. Madhavan as Dr. Pisharody
- Prem Prakash as Doctor
- Subbalakshmi as Ammachi special appearance in the song Entadukkel Vannadukkum
- Kalabhavan Haneef as Achankunju, Bus conductor

== Production ==
Marykkundoru Kunjaadu was filmed largely in and around the Thodupuzha region of Kerala, where many of the rural village scenes that form the backdrop of the story were shot. The production captured the scenic High Range landscape, which features prominently throughout the narrative, and principal photography included both scenic settings and sequence work integral to the plot’s development. Locations such as local churches and village roads in Thodupuzha were used during the shoot. The casting of the character Jose underwent several considerations during pre‑production. According to reports in Malayalam film media, Suresh Gopi was initially contacted for the role, with early discussions held between him and the filmmakers about the character and its requirements. Following these conversations, the team explored casting Lal who expressed interest but eventually had to step away from the project due to scheduling issues with another film. Subsequently, the role was offered to and accepted by Biju Menon, whose portrayal of Jose was noted as both distinctive and memorable.

== Soundtrack ==
Marykkundoru Kunjaadu

Soundtrack album by Berny-Ignatius
- Released: 20 December 2010
- Recorded: 2010
- Genre: Feature film soundtrack
- Length: 21:35
- Label: Satyam Music Through Matrubhumi Music
- Producer: Berny-Ignatius

The soundtrack of the film was released on 20 December 2010. It had music scored by composers Berny-Ignatius". Lyrics were provided by Anil Panachooran. There was no special launch for the audio release and the music were given straight through the audio sellers.

All lyrics are written by Anil Panachooran.

No.	Title	Singer(s)	Length
1.	"Enttadukke"	Shankar Mahadevan, Rimi Tomy, Pappukutty Bhagavathar, Subbalakshmi	4:35
2.	"Pancharachiri"	Franco, Sithara Krishnakumar	4:33
3.	"Kunjaade Kurumbanade"	Madhu Balakrishnan	4:29
4.	"Changathi Kuyile"	Master Anuragh, Kumari Yogini V Prabhu	3:29
5.	"Kunjaade"	Sithara	4:29

== Release ==
The film was released on 25 December 2010.

=== Critical reception ===
The Rediff critic rated the film 3 stars out of 5. Lead actors, Dileep's and Biju Menon's, performances were praised, and the credit was equally shared by the writer-director team. The film worked well.

=== Box office ===
The film went on to become commercial success, which completed 150 days in theatres and eventually became the second highest grossing Malayalam film of 2010 behind Pokkiri Raja.
