= Nimisha Suresh =

Indian actress

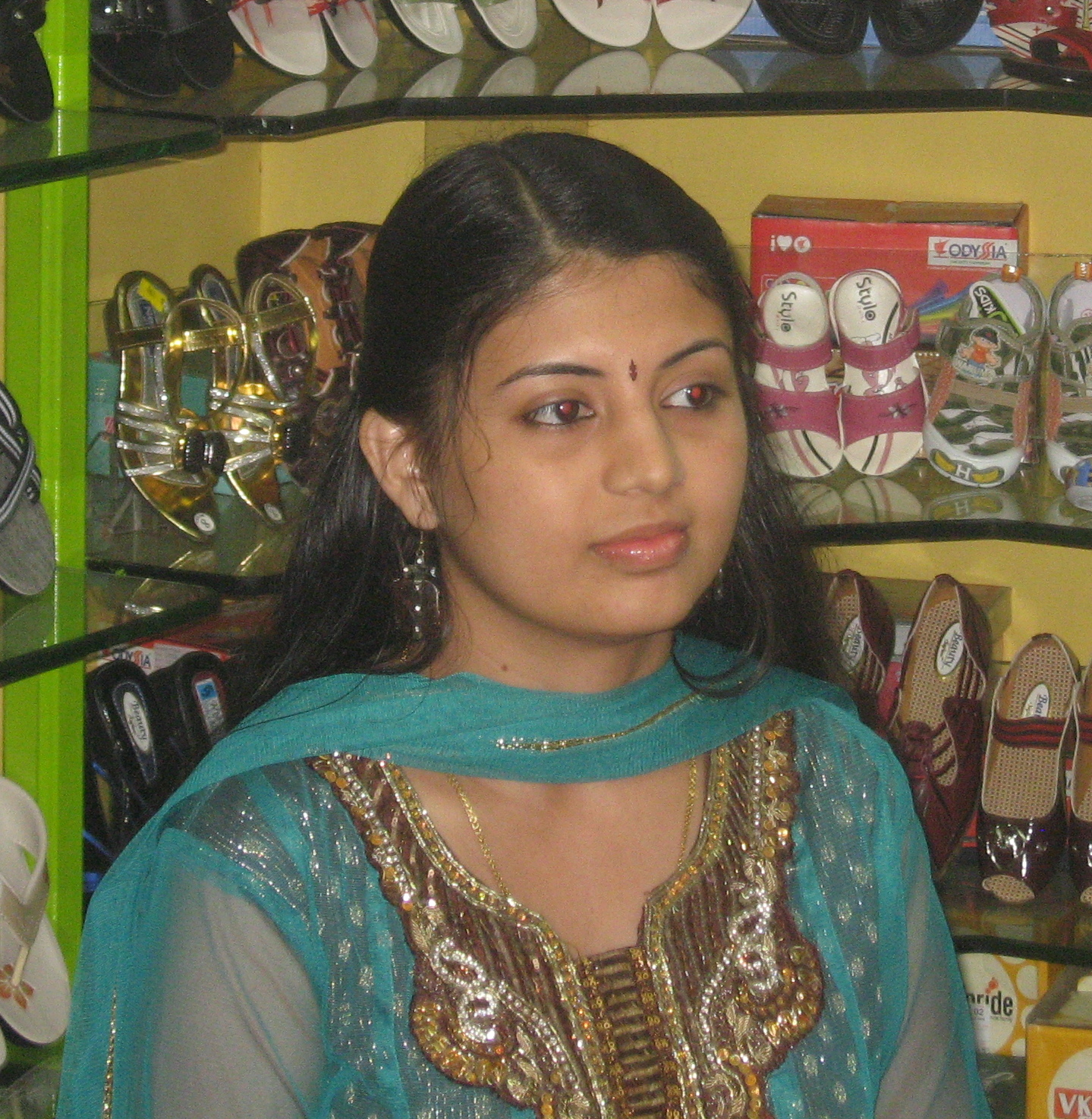
- Born: Kerala, India
- Occupation: Actress
- Years active: 2006–2014

Nimisha Suresh is a former Indian actress who acted predominantly in Malayalam cinema, mainly in supporting roles.

== Movie career ==
Nimisha Suresh started her career with the film Pachakuthira, directed by Kamal. She acted in films like Mayavi, directed by Shafi, Payum Puli, Marykkundoru Kunjaadu, Ithu Nammude Katha, Make-up Man, Doctor Love etc.

== Filmography ==
Year	Film	Role	Note
2006	Pachakkuthira	Diya	
2007	Mayavi	Ammu	
2007	Payum Puli	Maya	
2007	November Rain	Anu Sathya	
2010	Marykkundoru Kunjaadu	Sisily	
2011	Ithu Nammude Katha	Ammu	
2011	Makeup Man	Reality Show Winner	Cameo
2011	Doctor Love	Ebin's friend	
2011	Snehanilavu	Nun	Telefilm
2012	Padmasree Bharat Dr. Saroj Kumar	Film actress	Special appearance in the song "Kesu"
2012	Ordinary	Bus conductor	Cameo
2012	Mullamottum Munthiricharum	Eloped lady	
2012	Friday	Aswathy	
2013	Isaac Newton S/O Philipose	Sara Philipose	
2013	Pigman	Mahalakshmi	
2013	Aan Piranna Veedu	Jithin's sister	
2013	Ninaithathu Yaaro	Heroine Kavitha	Tamil
2013	Radio Jockey	Heroine Kanmani Karthu	
2014	Om Shanthi Oshaana	Sreelekshmi	

== Television ==
- 2015 : Smart Show - Flowers TV
