= Aadachayi =

2025 Indian Malayalam-language environmental drama film

- Malayalam: ആദച്ചായി
- Directed by: Binoy G. Russel
- Written by: Sunil K. Anand
- Screenplay by: Sunil K. Anand
- Story by: Binoy G. Russel
- Produced by: Siji Joseph
- Starring: Chembil Ashokan; Praveen Neelambaran; Pramod Veliyanad; Jordi Poonjar; Jolly Easo; Dr. Joji Joshua Philipose; Diana Binson
- Cinematography: K. S. Sunil
- Edited by: Subin Krishna
- Music by: Dr. Joji Joshua Philipose; Varkala G. R. Edwin
- Production company: J.J. Productions
- Release date: January 17, 2025 (India)
- Running time: 102 minutes
- Country: India
- Language: Malayalam

Aadachayi (Malayalam: ആദച്ചായി) is a 2025 Indian Malayalam-language environmental drama film written and directed by Dr. Binoy G. Russel. The film stars Chembil Ashokan in the title role, Pramod Veliyanad, Jordi Poonjar, Jolly Easo, and Dr. Joji Joshua Philipose.

Set against the dual backdrops of the Kuttanad wetlands and the Western Ghats, the film addresses agricultural preservation, systemic bureaucracy, and environmental exploitation by local quarry mafias. Aadachayi was released theatrically in India on 17 January 2025.

== Plot ==
The narrative serves as a poignant tribute to nature while exposing the underlying failures of democracy and bureaucracy regarding conservation. The story revolves around Aadachayi (Chembil Ashokan), a traditional farmer residing in the waterlogged region of Kuttanad, and his son Akhil Adam (played by Dr. Joji Joshua Philipose). Akhil grows up to become an agricultural officer and dedicates his career to passionately protecting the fragile ecosystem of the Western Ghats, which he reveres as his foster mother. The plot chronicles their struggles against an entrenched nexus of political figures and the quarry mafia actively exploiting the local terrain, highlighting the intrinsic connection between the agrarian community and the soil.

== Cast ==
- Chembil Ashokan as Aadachayi
- Dr. Joji Joshua Philipose as Akhil
- Pramod Veliyanad
- Jordi Poonjar
- Jolly Easo
- Diana Binson
- Surabhi Subhash
- Maxmillan Kurian Ninan
- Binu Kottayam

== Production ==
The film represents the feature directorial debut of Dr. Binoy G. Russel, a medical practitioner based in Kerala. It was produced by Siji Joseph under the banner of J.J. Productions. The script was authored by Dr. Russel, with the screenplay and dialogue adaptations completed by Sunil K. Anand. Principal cinematography was handled by K. S. Sunil, and editing was done by Subin Krishna. Color grading was done at Nexta Media Studio by Sivalal Ramakrishna.

== Music ==
The film's musical score and soundtrack were composed by Dr. Joji Joshua Philipose—a bone surgeon who also acts in the film—and Varkala G. R. Edwin. Dr. Philipose composed five songs and performed vocals for four tracks on the film's soundtrack. The lyrics were penned by Mankombu Gopalakrishnan, Sunil K. Anand, Dr. Philipose Joshua ( Karshakan song) and Varkala G. R. Edwin.

== Release ==
The official trailer for the film was launched on 8 October 2024 at the Kottayam Public Library in the presence of veteran lyricist and filmmaker Sreekumaran Thampi. Aadachayi received a wide theatrical release across India on 17 January 2025.

== Accolades ==
Prior to and following its commercial release, Aadachayi secured various awards across regional and independent international film festivals:

| Year | Award Festival | Category | Recipient | Result | Ref. |
|---|---|---|---|---|---|
| 2024 | 48th Kerala Film Critics Association Awards | Best Environmental Film | Aadachayi (Shared with The Life of Mangrove) | Won | |
| 2024 | Satyajit Ray Golden Arc Film Festival | Best Environmental Movie | Aadachayi | Won | |
| 2024 | Kookai International Film Festival | Best Narrative Feature Film | Aadachayi | Won | |
| 2024 | Indian Independent Film Festival | Honorable Mention (Best Indian Film) | Aadachayi | Won | |
| 2024 | Malnad International Wildlife and Environmental Film Festival | Best Feature Film | Aadachayi | Won | |
| 2024 | Better Earth International Film Festival | Best Debut Film Maker | Dr. Binoy G. Russel | Won | |
