= Sainoj =

Indian singer

T. T. Sainoj
- Born: 21 February 1977; Piravom, Eranakulam District, Kerala, India
- Died: 22 November 2009 (aged 32); Ernakulam, Kerala, India
- Occupation: Playback singer in Malayalam films

T. T. Sainoj (21 February 1977 – 22 November 2009) was an Indian singer from Piravom in the Ernakulam District of the state of Kerala.

== Biography ==
Sainoj learned the nuances of music at Chittur Government College where he did his graduation and post-graduation. He had topped in the light music and ghazals at the all-India Akashvani music competition and won a Central Government scholarship for Carnatic music.

He was selected as 'KALAPRATHIBHA' for continuous three years in Calicut University A-zone Festival. He has achieved prizes in Light Music/Carnatic Music competitions for Calicuty University Youth Festival.

Sainoj had emerged into the limelight, when he won the 'Gandharva Sangeetham' contest at the Kairali TV channel in 2002.

== Career ==
His first film as playback singer was the Vinayan directed War and Love (2003), with a semi-classical song 'Kanna thedunna...' composed by Mohan Sithara. His song in the Jayasurya starrer Ivar Vivahitharayal (2009) -Enikku paadaaanoru pattinundoru pennu was a popular hit. The last film that he had sung for was Viji Thampi's Chemistry (2009). He was a close associate of music composer M. Jayachandran.

He died on 22 November 2009 aged 32 at Ernakulam Medical Trust Hospital due to leukemia. He was a bachelor and is survived by father Thankappan, mother Ragini, brother Saiju and sister Soorya. His death came as a shock to music lovers, because he did not tell anyone about his disease. He was also just emerging to limelight then.

== Discography ==
1. Kannane thedunna from War and Love (2003)
2. Nee Kulir from Subadram (2007)
3. Meghalalo from John Appa Rao 40 plus (2008)
4. Thamarapookalum from Orkkuka Vallappozhum (2009)
5. Enikku paadaaanoru from Ivar Vivahitharayal (2009)
