= She Taxi (film) =

- Directed by: Saji Surendran
- Written by: Krishna Poojappura
- Produced by: Abraham Mathew
- Starring: Anoop Menon; Kavya Madhavan; Suraj Venjaramoodu
- Music by: Bijibal
- Production company: Abam Movies
- Release date: 2015
- Country: India
- Language: Malayalam

She Taxi is a 2015 Indian Malayalam language film directed by Saji Surendran and produced by Abraham Mathew. The film stars Anoop Menon and Kavya Madhavan in the lead roles. It is directed by Saji Surendran and the screenplay is based on a story written by him. The music is composed by Bijibal.

== Plot ==
The film is centered around the character of Devayani, a female taxi driver. She had to take up the job due to the sudden death of her father. She has several problems in her life and is in search of something that would change her fortune. She takes a trip to Coorg with three girls Meera, Rupa and Sradha. In parallel to this journey was another troupe, dubbed as 'the bad boys with a mission' with Joe, Salman, Umesh Pisharadi alias Umpidi and their mentor undertaking a trip. These parallel journeys intersect along the way. Meanwhile, during the trip they come to know that Devayani knows Joe in advance of the trip. Later, it is revealed that Meera and her friends were in search of a valuable painting which takes the group to the beautiful locations of Shimla. There they face various difficulties in reaching their goal.

== Cast ==
- Anoop Menon as Joe Joseph
- Kavya Madhavan as Devayani
- Sheelu Abraham as Meera Mammen
- Suraj Venjaramoodu as TK Salman
- Noby Marcose as Umesh Pisharadi (Umpidi)
- Tini Tom as Professor
- Ansiba Hassan as Rupa Pillai
- Krishna Prabha as Sradha
- Ambika as Joe's mother
- K. B. Ganesh Kumar as Singham Sivadas
- Prem Kumar as Valiya Nambiar
- Mukundan as Cheriya Nambiar
- Nishanth Sagar as Usman
- Jaffar Idukki as Kanjav Moideen

           

== Soundtrack ==
The music is composed by Bijipal along with Vijay Yesudas and Jassie Gift.

- "Karinkallikkuyile" -Sudeep Kumar, Akhila
- "Vezhambal Mizhikal" – Vijay Yesudas
- "Run Run" – Jassie Gift, Sumi
