= November Rain (2007 film) =

- Directed by: Vinu Joseph
- Written by: Vinu Joseph
- Screenplay by: Santhosh Echikkanam
- Starring: Arun; Daniel Balaji; Lalu Alex; Geetha; Nimisha Suresh
- Cinematography: Viswamangal Kitsu
- Edited by: B. Ajithkumar
- Music by: Anup S. Nair
- Production company: Touch Screen Corporation
- Distributed by: Touch Screen Corporation
- Release date: 16 March 2007
- Country: India
- Language: Malayalam

November Rain is a 2007 Indian Malayalam-language film directed by Vinu Joseph. The film stars Arun, Daniel Balaji, Lalu Alex, Nimisha Suresh and Geetha in lead roles. The film has musical score by Anup S. Nair.

== Plot ==
Sathyanarayan is the son of CI Krishnamoorthy and Indira. Krishnamoorthy is an honest and straightforward police officer who wants his son to get educated well. Sathya joins the college after his schooling. He disregards his dad's wishes and gets into the company of baddies and in the course of time, he becomes their hero. In search of quick money, they plan to rob a bank. Majeed Ali, a dreaded and terrorising crime boss tries to wipe out Sathya and his mates. He creates problems at times for Sathya. Sathya loves Anu and marries her against his and her parents' approval. Eventually, Sathya's father commits suicide. Whether Sathya destroys his enemies and comes out victorious and leads a normal life. The aftermath is narrated in the later part.

== Cast ==
- Arun as Sathyanarayan Krishnamoorthy (Sathya)
- Lalu Alex as CI Krishnamoorthy, Sathya's father
- Daniel Balaji as Majeed Ali
- Sreejith Ravi as Sai
- Aniyappan as Sajeevan
- Niyas Backer as Pappu
- Geetha as Indira Krishnamoorthy, Sathya's mother
- Nimisha Suresh as Anu, Sathya's love interest
- Sajitha Betti as Archana, Sathya's sister
- Spadikam George as Saravanan
- Reji Nair
- Sajeevan
- Sadiq as Peter
- Samad
- Vinod Kovoor

== Soundtrack ==
The music was composed by Anup S Nair.

No.	Song	Singers	Lyrics	Length (m:ss)
1	"Aarumaarum"	Sreenivas	Brajesh Ramachandran, Sachithanandan Puzhankara, Suresh	
2	"Aarumaarum"	Jyotsna, Sreenivas	Brajesh Ramachandran, Sachithanandan Puzhankara, Suresh	
3	"Bad Company"	Anup S. Nair	Brajesh Ramachandran, Sachithanandan Puzhankara, Suresh	
4	"Chembakappoo"	G. Venugopal	Brajesh Ramachandran, Sachithanandan Puzhankara, Suresh	
5	"Chembakappoo" (F)	Sujatha Mohan	Sachithanandan Puzhankara	
6	"Dham"	Jyotsna, Franco	Brajesh Ramachandran, Sachithanandan Puzhankara, Suresh	
7	"Gaanamayidaam"	Tippu	Brajesh Ramachandran, Sachithanandan Puzhankara, Suresh	
8	"November Rain"	Brajesh Ramachandran, Sachithanandan Puzhankara, Suresh	Brajesh Ramachandran, Sachithanandan Puzhankara, Suresh	
9	"Raavin Nenjil"	Balu, Anup S. Nair	Brajesh Ramachandran, Sachithanandan Puzhankara, Suresh	
