= Subi Suresh =

Indian Malayalam actress (died 2023)

- Born: 23 August 1981; Thrippunithura, Kerala, India
- Died: 22 February 2023 (aged 41); Kochi, Kerala, India
- Occupations: Actress, television presenter, comedian
- Years active: 1993–2023

Subi Suresh (23 August 1981 – 22 February 2023) was an Indian Malayalam actress, television host, comedian, and stage-show performer. She is known mainly for her role in popular Malayalam movies such as Thaskara Lahala (2010), Grihanathan (2012), and Drama (2018). She is known for her comic voice and managed to make her own space in comedy. Subi also worked as a professional comedian and television anchor, and appeared in TV shows such as Cinemala.

== Early life ==
Subi Suresh was born in Tripunithura, Ernakulam district and raised in a well-to-do family from Kochi, Kerala, India. Her parents are Suresh and Ambika. She completed her schooling from Tripunithura Government School and received her college education from St. Teresa's College in Ernakulam.

== Career ==
Subi is mostly known among the Malayali audience for her comedy shows. She started her career in August 1993 as an anchor for Cinemala. She entered the Malayalam film industry in 2001 with the film Aparannar Nagarathil, directed by Nisar. Suresh subsequently acted in more than twenty films including Elsamma Enna Aankutty, Panchavarna Tatta, Happy Husbands, and Drama.

Subi later made appearances in the television series Thaksara Lahala (2010) and Kuttipattalam as well as the movie Grihanathan (2012). She also participated in various Malayalam TV shows as an anchor and a comedian. She was a member of the Cochin Kalabhavan troupe, and was the face of popular comedy shows at a time when women participation in mimicry was uncommon.

== Death ==
On 22 February 2023, Subi died at Rajagiri Hospital in Kochi from liver disease. She was 41.

== Filmography ==
Year	Film	Role	Notes
2001	Aparanmaar Nagarathil	Seema	
2003	Lesa Lesa	Balamani's friend	Tamil film
2004	Greetings	Sarojam	
2006	Kanaka Simhasanam	Tripurasundari	
2006	Pachakuthira	Sarasu	
2007	Detective	Journalist	
2007	Nagaram	Sugandhavally	
2008	Novel	Nisha	
2010	Elsamma Enna Aankutty	Zainaba	
2010	Happy Husbands	Servant	
2010	Thaskara Lahala	Shalini	
2010	Kaaryasthan	Herself	
2011	Killadi Raman	Treesamma Kuriakose	
2011	Lucky Jokers	Ratnam and Yakshi	
2011	Sandwich	Seema	
2011	Kathayile Naayika	Sulochana	
2012	Njanum Ente Familiyum	Ammalu	
2012	Grihanathan	Shantha	
2012	Unnam	Crying lady at hospital	
2012	101 Weddings	Sundareshan's wife	
2012	I Love Me	Event Management; Company Staff	
2012	Padmasree Bharat Dr. Saroj Kumar	TV Reporter	
2013	Dolls	Sisily Perera	
2013	Breaking News Live	Rosakutty	
2013	Ladies and Gentleman	Info Solutions receptionist	
2017	Cappuccino	Cooking show anchor	
2018	Panchavarnathatha	Chithra's Friend	
2018	Drama	Ammini	
2019	Chila NewGen Nattuvisheshangal	Meera's mother	
2019	Vakathirivu	Sheeba teacher	

== Television ==
Year	Title	Role	Channel	Genre
1995 - 2013	Cinemala	Multiple roles	Asianet	TV Serial
	Varsha			Telefilm
2004 - 2005	Santhanagopalam		Asianet	TV Serial
2005	Calling Bell		Surya TV	TV Serial
	Kudumbapuranam		Jaihind TV	TV Serial
	Adutha Bellinu Nadakam Aarambikkum			TV Serial
2005-2006	Indumukhi Chandramathi		Surya TV	TV Serial
2010	Jyothis Mimimcs Action 2010		Kairali TV	
2011	John De Panic		Mazhavil Manorama	TV Serial
2011	Chakyarum Kapyarum Pinne Moilyarum		Surya TV	TV Serial
2012	Nair Pidicha Pulival		Surya TV	
2012-2016	Kuttipattalam	Host	Surya TV	
2013	Talk Talk with Subi		Asianet	
2013	Cinemala 1000 Event		Asianet	
2013	Comedy Festival	Supporting artist	Mazhavil Manorama	
2014	Laughing Villa with Navas		Kairali TV	
2014	Ashwamedham	Participant	Kairali TV	
2014	Nammal Thammil	Panelist	Asianet	
2014	Rhythm		Kairali TV	
2014	Chirikkum Pattanam		Kairali TV	
2014	Cinema Chirima		Mazhavil Manorama	
2014	Mylanchi 3 Grandfinale		Asianet	
2015; 2016	Smart Show	Participant	Flowers	
2015	Made for Each Other	Co-Host	Mazhavil Manorama	
2015	Comedy Super Nite	Host	Flowers	
2015	Ivide Ingannanu Bhai		Mazhavil Manorama	
2015	Vanitha		Mazhavil Manorama	
2015	Ithiri Magikkum Othiri Thamashayum		Mazhavil Manorama	
2015	Hello Namasthe		Mazhavil Manorama	
2015	Ponnona Punchiri		ACV	
2016	Fastest Family First	Participant	Asianet	
2016	Mollywood Selfie		Asianet Plus	
2017	Prekshakare Aavashyamundu	Diana	Mazhavil Manorama	
2015; 2017	Onnum Onnum Moonu		Surya TV	
2017	Asianet Comedy Awards		Asianet	
2017	Asianet Comedy Staars		Asianet	
2017	JB Junction		Kairali TV	
2017	Comedy Challenge	Host	Asianet	
2018	Aa Yathrayil		Safari TV	
2018	Show Mall		Media One	
2018	Urvasi Theatres		Asianet	
2018	Labour Room		Asianet	
2018	Thakarppan Comedy		Mazhavil Manorama	
2018	Adaar Onam		Flowers	
2019 - 2020	Kuttipattalam Season 2	Host	Surya TV	
2019	Kuttipachakam	Host	Surya TV	
2019	Onamamangam	Host	Surya TV	
2019	Red FM Malayalam Music Awards	Host	Surya TV	
2019	Annies Kitchen		Amrita TV	
2019	Paisa Paisa	Host	Kerala Vision	
2019	8 Thaara Sundarikalum Pinne Njanum	Host	Kaumudy TV	
2020	Parayam Nedam	Participant	Amrita TV	
2020	Onam Ruchimelam		Asianet	
2020	Jingle Bells with Minnum Tharangal	Host	Surya TV	
2020	Madhura Pathinettil Prithvi		Surya TV	
2020	Funny Nights with Pearle Maaney		Zee Keralam	
2020 - 2023	Subi Suresh Official	Host	YouTube	
2021	Funs Upon a Time Version 2		Amrita TV	
2021	Comedy Maamankam		Asianet	
2021	Oru Innocent Onam		Kaumudy TV	
2021	Aram + Aram = Kinnaram		Surya TV	
2021	SIIMA Awards		Surya TV	
2021 - 2022	Comedy Thillana		Kairali TV	
2021	Day with a Star		Kaumudy TV	
2021	Bzinga	Participant	Zee Keralam	
2022	Panam Tharum Padam	Participant	Mazhavil Manorama	
2022	Pisharodiyum Tharangalum	Participant	Asianet	
2022	Bumper Chiri Aaghosham		Mazhavil Manorama	
2022	Kusruthi Pattalam	Host	YouTube	
2022	Nattu Midukki	Host	Surya TV	
2022	Red Carpet	Mentor	Amrita TV	
2022	Comedy Masters	Mentor	Amrita TV	
2022	Kaumudy Onam		Kaumudy TV	
2022	Comedy Express		Kairali TV	
2022	Fastest Family First Season 2	Participant	Asianet	
2023	Flowers Oru Kodi	Participant	Flowers	
2023	Onnannara Ruchi	Host	Zee Keralam	
