= Panchavarnathatha =

- Theatrical release poster
- Directed by: Ramesh Pisharody
- Written by: Hari P. Nair; Ramesh Pisharody
- Produced by: Maniyanpilla Raju
- Starring: Jayaram; Kunchacko Boban
- Cinematography: Pradeep Nair
- Edited by: V. Saajan
- Music by: Songs: M Jayachandran; Nadirshah; Background Score: Ouseppachan
- Production company: Maniyanpilla Raju Productions
- Distributed by: Saptha Tarang Cinema
- Release date: 14 April 2018
- Country: India
- Language: Malayalam

Panchavarnathatha (transl. Five-coloured Parrot) is a 2018 Indian Malayalam-language comedy film directed by Ramesh Pisharody in his directorial debut and co-written with Hari P. Nair. It was produced by Maniyanpilla Raju through Maniyanpilla Raju Productions, and stars Jayaram and Kunchacko Boban.

Principal photography began in Velloor on 10 January 2018. The film was released on 14 April 2018 during the Vishu holiday.

== Plot ==
The story revolves around Vijayan Joseph Muhammed, a unique person who owns a pet shop. He had come to this place years back with a circus troupe. The pet shop is a concern to many of his neighbours. Kalesh is the MLA of this particular constituency and the next election is nearing. While attending the first holy communion of Abraham's daughter, Kalesh's wife Chithra abducts a Macaw while drunk. Vijayan gets the video of Chithra in which she takes the parrot. As for the circumstances they allow him to stay in their home after he and his animals are evicted from their place. Vijayan and his friend Velu, along with their animals, help Kalesh and his family in many ways, earning their appreciation. Through a friend settled abroad, Kalesh and Chithra offer Vijayan a job, but he refuses it for some reason. The next day, Velu tries to wake up Vijayan after his phone beeps but he doesn't get up. Vijayan has died in his sleep. Everyone from the local neighbourhood mourns and weep from Vijayan's death. Kalesh gives Vijayan's Macaw to a little orphan girl. It is revealed to be Vijayan's final wish, which had told Kalesh, along with the fact he is terminally ill. Kalesh and Chithra walk away with the girl and the Macaw, implying they may adopt her.

== Cast ==
- Jayaram as Vijayan Joseph Mohammed
- Kunchacko Boban as MLA Kalesh
- Anusree as Chithra
- Ashokan as Udayan
- Maniyanpilla Raju as Abraham
- Joju George as Nazeer
- Dharmajan Bolgatty as Velu
- Mallika Sukumaran as Sreelatha Teacher
- Salim Kumar as Adv. Jimmy
- Prem Kumar as SI K.O Rangan
- Anjo Nayar as Abraham's wife
- Janardhanan as Bride's Father
- Tini Tom as James Thomas
- Kunchan as Anil, Pet Buyer
- Seema G. Nair as Deepa Udayan
- Subi Suresh as Chithra's Friend
- Nandhan Unni as Unnikrishnan
- Chembil Ashokan as Eappachen
- Vinod Kedamangalam as Eappachen's Assistant
- Chali Pala as Kunjachan, Wedding Guest
- Balaji Sarma as Sabu, Jimmy's Assistant
- Kalabhavan Haneef as Ajayan, Jimmy's Assistant
- Sajan Palluruthy as Chacko, Jimmy's Assistant
- K. T. S. Padannayil as Babu
- Devichandana as Chinnamma
- Manju Pathrose as Servant
- Dini Daniel as Bus Conductor
- Kanakalatha as Bride's Mother
- Bindu Murali as Nun
- Jis Joy as Pet Buyer (Cameo Appearance)
- Sreejith Ravi as Pet Buyer's Son (Photo Presence)
- Subeesh Sudhi as Thoma, Driver
- Firoz Azeez as an artist in dubbing studio
- Lakshmika Sajeevan as Sreekala

== Production ==
Panchavarnathatha is the directorial debut of Ramesh Pisharody and he co-wrote the film with Hari P. Nair. It was originally meant to be directed by Nadirshah, who suggested Pisharody to direct it himself. Since Maniyanpilla Raju had earlier suggested Pisharody to direct a film some years ago, he approached Raju for investing the film to which he agreed. Principal photography commenced on 10 January 2018 at Velloor, Kottayam in Kerala. The main locations are Karikode, Peruva and Pala.

== Music ==
Panchavarnathatha (Original Motion Picture Soundtrack)

Soundtrack album by M. Jayachandran, Nadirshah
- Released: 5 April 2018
- Recorded: Aries Vismaya Max
- Genre: Feature Film Soundtrack
- Language: Malayalam

The music of the film is composed by M. Jayachandran and Nadirshah, while lyrics is written by Santhosh Varma and B. K. Harinarayanan. The full soundtrack album, consisting of 4 tracks was released on 5 April 2018 by Manorama Music.

Track listing
No.	Title	Singer(s)	Length
1.	"Varika Rasika"	Shankar Mahadevan (Raga)-Kamboji
2.	"Panchavarna Thatha"	Haricharan, Jyothsna
3.	"Chiri Chiri"	M. G. Sreekumar
4.	"Pokayayi"	K. J. Yesudas

== Release ==
=== Theatrical ===
The film was released on 14 April 2018 and was a commercial success at the box office.
