= Happy Husbands (2010 film) =

Indian comedy film

- Movie poster
- Directed by: Saji Surendran
- Screenplay by: Krishna Poojappura
- Story by: Sakthi Chidambaram
- Based on: Charlie Chaplin (Tamil)
- Produced by: Milan Jaleel
- Starring: Jayaram; Indrajith Sukumaran; Jayasurya
- Cinematography: Anil Nair
- Edited by: Manoj
- Music by: M. Jayachandran
- Distributed by: Anantha Vision
- Release date: 14 January 2010
- Running time: 162 minutes
- Country: India
- Language: Malayalam
- Budget: ₹6 crore
- Box office: ₹12 crore

Happy Husbands is a 2010 Indian Malayalam-language comedy film directed by Saji Surendran, written by Krishna Poojappura and produced by Milan Jaleel under his banner Galaxy Films. It is the remake of 2002 Tamil film Charlie Chaplin. The film stars Jayaram, Indrajith Sukumaran and Jayasurya in title roles with Bhavana, Samvrutha Sunil, Rima Kallingal. The film completed a 150-day theatrical run and became a blockbuster.

== Plot summary ==
The story revolves around 3 husbands who have a different life styles: Mukundan Menon is a journalist who owns a news publishing firm called Kerala Today. He is a normal husband who loves his wife Krishnendu a lot, but she is too possessive about him. She thinks he is not very expressive about his feelings and is always worried that he is having affairs with other girls and dating them. John Mathai is a photographer in Mukundan's publication, who Mukundan and Krishnendu considers as a young brother. He was neither interested in girls nor keen to get married until he met Sereena, the daughter of a retired DGP, who mistakes him to be a suicide maniac for a love failure. Mukundan's close friend, Rahul is just the opposite side. He is extremely romantic and never comes home without some cute gifts for his loving wife, Shreya. But she doesn't know that, behind her back, her husband is dying to flirt with every woman that he sees.

It is into the lives of these three couples, a bar singer and dancer named Diana Philip, arrives and things take some interesting turns. Diana forces Mukundan to come to a mall, with some intentions. But Mukundan spots Krishnendu and Shreya there and runs away with Diana. As he realised that Krishnendu has spotted his car and his presence in the mall, Mukundan covers up the scene as he came to brought a present for Krishnendu after surrendering to her. Being happy with her husband's gift, Krishnendu becomes pregnant. After realising that Mukundan has escaped from the mall, Diana forcibly comes to Mukundan's house at the next day and they both accidentally catches the eye of Krishnendu. To escape from trouble, Mukundan says that she is John's wife Elina. Later, when John, Mukundan and Rahul are talking about John's marriage proposal to Serena's father, Diana comes there after being arrested due to hotel raid. Rahul says that she is Mukundan's wife and she is mentally insane. So now Krishnendu and Shreya think Diana is John's wife, and Sereena believes that Diana is Mukundan's wife. At one time, all these people come together in Malaysia for a vacation. This leads to a lot of confusion among the wives and others and finally the wives realise the truth and thus leave their husbands. The husbands try many attempts to win their wives back but all their attempts go in vain. Finally, the 3 wives come to meet Diana, who is staying in a hill station resort. Diana tells them that she was actually seeking revenge on Mukundan, as he published an article in Kerala Today, which the Maharashtra high court took as a social petition and application, which banned bar singers and dancers there, thus ruining Diana's profession. While planning to take her revenge, she realised that Mukundan is a poor and innocent husband, who loves his wife very dearly. Diana makes them understand their husband's love for them and that it was the fear of losing their wives that made them lie. She also adds that Krishnendu's possessiveness and suspicions made all these problems. The wives realises their mistakes, forgive their husbands and reconciles with them.

== Cast ==
- Jayaram as Mukundan Menon
- Indrajith Sukumaran as Rahul Vallyathan
- Jayasurya as John Mathai
- Bhavana as Krishnendu, Mukundan's wife (Voiceover by Devi S.)
- Samvrutha Sunil as Shreya, Rahul's wife
- Vandana Menon as Sereena, John's lover turned wife
- Rima Kallingal as Diana Philip
- Suraj Venjaramoodu as Theepandal Raj Boss (Rajappan)
- Salim Kumar in a dual role as:
  - Dr. Sathyapalan
  - Dharmapalan
- Maniyanpilla Raju as Minister Pazhakutti Pavithran (Pazham Pavan)
- Mamukkoya as astrologer
- T. P. Madhavan as Retired DGP Alexander Mathews IPS
- Sadiq as SI 'Idiyan' Idikulla
- Shaju as Pazhakutty's assistant
- Subi Suresh as servant

== Music ==
The soundtrack for this film was composed by M. Jayachandran.

1. "Etho Poonilakalam" - Rashmi Vijayan
2. "Oru Manjakili koodu" - Indrajith, Anand Narayan, Achu Rajamani
3. "Take It Easy" - Achu Rajamani

== Reception ==
Upon release, the film became a commercial success. It collected more than ₹2.5 crore distributor's share from Kerala in 75 days run. The film completed a 150-day run in a theatre in Thiruvananthapuram.

== See also ==
- Husbands in Goa
