= Jailer =

Jailer (alternatively, Jailor) may refer to:

- Prison officer, sometimes known as "jailer"
  - Prison warden, official term in the U.S. state of Kentucky

Films

- Jailor (1938 film), an Indian Hindi-language film
- Jailor (1958 film), an Indian Hindi-language film
- Jailer (2023 Tamil film), an Indian Tamil-language film by Nelson Dilipkumar
  - Jailer (soundtrack), of the film by Anirudh Ravichander
- Jailer (2023 Malayalam film), an Indian Malayalam-language film by Sakkir Madathil
- Jailor (Sholay), a fictional character played by Asrani in the 1975 classic Indian film Sholay

Music

- "Jailer", a song by Aṣa from her self-titled album Aṣa
