= Chembil Ashokan =

Indian actor

- Born: 29 November 1960 (age 65)
- Occupation: Actor
- Years active: 2009–present

Chembil Ashokan is an actor in the Malayalam film industry. He has appeared in various roles in Malayalam cinema including Money Ratnam (2014).

== Early life and career ==
Ashokan is from Chempu near Vaikom and was a neighbor of Mammootty. He was brought up in a family of five and his father died early on. He was a part of the theatrical group Kalidasa Kalakendram and worked in theatre for 22 years before Mammootty's brother Ibrahimkutty helped him get into films by taking him to film sets and introducing him. Director Sathyan Anthikad who noticed his performance in Amrita TV's 2008 serial Aranazhikeneram called him for a role in Bhagyadevatha (2009).

== Filmography ==
Year	Title	Role	Notes
2009	Bhagyadevatha		
2009	Chattambinadu		
2009	Evidam Swargamanu		
2010	Pramani		
2010	Paappi Appacha		
2010	Katha Thudarunnu	Narayanan	
2010	Thaskara Lahala		
2010	College Days	MLA Keshavan Kutty	
2011	Kayam		
2011	Snehaveedu	Maniyan	
2011	Violin		
2012	No. 66 Madhura Bus		
2012	Ivan Megharoopan		
2013	Celluloid	Paulose	
2013	ABCD: American-Born Confused Desi	Zachariah	
2014	Darboni		
2014	1983	Tea Shop Owner	
2014	Manglish	Union Leader	
2014	Vellimoonga		
2014	Money Ratnam	Joppa	
2014	Oru Korean Padam		
2014	Thekku Thekkoru Desathu		
2014	Actually	Shivan	
2014	Oru Mazhavil Swapnam		
2014	The Bail		
2014	Murukku		
2015	Iruvazhi Thiriyunnidam		
2015	Aadu		
2015	Life of Josutty		
2015	Anarkali		
2015	Aana Mayil Ottakam		
2016	Varna Vasanthangal		
2016	Valleem Thetti Pulleem Thetti	Govachan	
2016	Kammatipaadam	Krishna's Uncle	
2016	Pulimurugan	Thankachan	
2016	Romanov		
2017	Jomonte Suvisheshangal		
2017	Honey Bee 2: Celebrations		
2017	Paippin Chuvattile Pranayam		
2018	Parole		
2018	Panchavarnathatha	Eappachen	
2018	Marubhoomiyile Mazhathullikal		
2018	Pettilambattra		
2018	Mangalyam Thanthunanena	Koora	
2018	Aanakkallan	Kuruppu	
2018	Ottakoru Kaamukan	Matrimonial advertisement girl's father	
2019	Nalla Vishesham		
2019	Oru Yamandan Premakadha	Vickey's Father	
2019	Prakashante Metro		
2019	Mask	Achayan	
2019	Luca	Martin	
2019	Thanka Bhasma Kuriyitta Thamburatty		
2019	Adhyarathri	Sukumaran	
2020	Uriyattu		
2021	Meezan		
2021	Sumesh and Ramesh		
2021	Jan. E. Man	Manikunju	
2024	Oru Anweshanathinte Thudakkam		
2025	Aadachayi	Aadachayi	Lead role
2025	Written & Directed by God		

== Television ==
- Aranazhikeneram (Amrita TV) (2008)
- Veendum Jwalayayi (DD Malayalam)
- Kadamattathu Kathanar (JaiHind TV)
- Bhasi Bahadoor (Mazhavil Manorama)
