= Pettilambattra =

- Directed by: Syam Lenin
- Screenplay by: Syam Lenin
- Produced by: Swaroop Mayilvahanam
- Starring: Indrans; Irshad; Jenson Alappat; Levin Simon Joseph
- Music by: Shashwath Sunil Kumar Paliath
- Production company: 7Pavo Entertainments
- Release date: 29 June 2018
- Country: India
- Language: Malayalam

Pettilambattra is a 2018 Indian Malayalam-language film written and directed by Syam Lenin. It is a comedy drama film that narrates the story of four men living in a small town in Kerala, India. The film was released on 29 June 2018.

== Cast ==
- Indrans as Ramettan
- Irshad as S.I.Rameshan
- Levin Simon Joseph as Kidu
- Sanmayanandan as Kathappan
- Jenson Alappat as Pragini
- Roni raj as Swami
- Sivadas madampalli as Sivan
- Ullas panthalam as Sugunan
- Chembil ashokan as Mash
- Paravoor Vasanthi as Kathappan mother
- Sabitha Nair as Sulu
- Neha krishnanan as Swayam/ Swayamprabha
- Mary as Mary
- Anitha nair as Anitha
- Arathi krishna as Arathi
- Sharikha as Reena
