= Kuttanpillayude Sivarathri =

2018 film by Jean Markose

- Theatrical release poster
- Directed by: Jean Markose
- Written by: Jean Markose; Joselet Joseph
- Produced by: Raji Nandakumar
- Starring: Suraj Venjaramoodu; Mithun Ramesh; Biju Sopanam
- Cinematography: Fazil Nassar
- Edited by: Shibish K. Chandran
- Music by: Sayanora Philip
- Production company: Alanghat Productions
- Distributed by: Alanghat Release
- Release date: 11 May 2018
- Running time: 120 minutes
- Country: India
- Language: Malayalam

Kuttanpillayude Sivarathri (English: Kuttanpilla's Sivarathri) is a 2018 Indian Malayalam-language horror comedy film directed by Jean Markose and produced by Raji Nandakumar through production studio Alanghat Productions. The film set in the backdrop of Puttingal temple fire. The film stars Suraj Venjaramoodu, Mithun Ramesh and Biju Sopanam in the lead roles. Other co-lead roles are done by Asha Sreekanth, Srinda Arhaan, Ramya Suresh, Radio Presenter Dr.Shruthy Muralidharan and popular percussionist Shilpa Sreekumar. The movie also marks playback singer Sayanora Philip's debut music directorial. Fazil Nassar is the cinematographer and Shibish K Chandran is the editor.

== Plot ==
Plachottil Kuttan Pillai is a strong-willed policeman who lives a contented life with his wife, Sub-Inspector Shakunthala, looking after his backyard farm. They have three children, all married and settled. A party of his relatives - his children, their spouses and the extended family - converge at his humble home to attend the annual Shivarathri festival attached to the famous Shiva Temple in the neighbourhood. Yet, the festive mood is soon embroiled with selfish objectives of the sons-in-law, blowing off Pillai's peaceful domestic life. One of his son-in-law, Suneesh, intends to cut down a huge jackfruit tree in Kuttan Pillai's backyard to make furniture for his new house, but Kuttan Pillai protests. Suneesh fights Kuttan Pillai and he leaves the house along with his wife Rajani and children. The next day, Kuttan Pillai dies when a jackfruit falls onto him while taking a stroll around his backyard. He becomes a ghost and, along with some other ghosts, watches what is going to happen in his house after his death. Meanwhile, Kuttan Pillai learns that the other ghosts died in the Puttingal Temple Fire accident, which occurred on Shivarathri day. Suneesh tries to cut the tree soon after Kuttan Pillai's funeral, much to the worry of his apparition. However, Shakunthala stops him from doing so with a stern warning, leaving behind a happy Kuttan Pillai.

== Cast ==
- Suraj Venjaramoodu as Head Constable Plachottil Kuttan Pillai
- Mithun Ramesh as Sachin Vaykundam
- Biju Sopanam as Suneesh
- Asha Madathil Sreekanth as SI Shakuntala Kuttan Pillai
- Srinda Arhaan as Rajani
- Dain Davis as Vishakan
- Vinimol Viswambharan as Premalatha
- Remya Suresh as Raji
- Shruthy Muralidharan as Sushama
- Kumar Sethu as Susheelan
- Srikanth Murali as Fr. Rodruigez
- Kochu Preman as Fr. Joseph Puthanpurakkal
- Poojappura Radhakrishnan as Aashaan
- Praveen Ram as Ganeshan
- Swathi Thara as Lathika
- Pinku Plakkadu as Hareendran
- Rajesh Manarkad as Karmi
- James Eliyas as Driver
- Kothanath Kochammalu Amma as Kuttan Pillai's Ammayi
- Shilpa Sreekumar as Shalini
- Rinsa Jacob as Asma
- Praveen Menon as Gopan
- Karishma Ganglani as Arabic woman
- Mufaz as Arabic woman's lover
- Jibin V Das as Villager

== Awards ==
Award	Category	Nominee(s)	Result
21st Asianet Film Awards	Best Character Actor	Suraj Venjaramoodu	Won
