= Saji Surendran =

Indian film director

- Born: 19 July 1977 (age 49); Thiruvananthapuram, Kerala, India
- Education: Mahatma Gandhi College, Thiruvananthapuram
- Occupation: Film director
- Spouse: Sangeeta (m. 2005)
- Children: 2

Saji Surendran (born 19 July 1977) is an Indian film director working in the Malayalam film industry, known for films such as Ivar Vivahitharayal (2009) and Happy Husbands (2010).

== Personal life ==
Saji Surendran was born to Surendran and Vijayalakshmi in Nedumangad, Thiruvananthapuram, Kerala, and attended Lourdes Mount School, at Vattapara. He completed his bachelor's degree from Mahatma Gandhi College, Thiruvananthapuram. When he was studying there, he also acted in TV Serials he also worked as assistant director of Viji Thampi in many movies and television serials. His brother Aji Surendran also acted in some TV serials. Saji is married to Sangeeta since 16 March 2005. The couple is having two twin boys Vedant and Virat born on 11 July 2011.

== Career ==
Saji was a serial director before 2008. In 2004 he received the Best Telefilm Award for his Manasam (Asianet) at the Kaveri Film Critics Television Awards. He is known for directing the television serials Manasam, Megham, Aalippazham, Mandharam, Daya, and Ammakkay.

He came to the film industry by directing Jayasurya-Bhama starring Ivar Vivahitharayal, which was a success at the box office and gave Jayasurya a big break. After Ivar Vivahitharayal, he directed Happy Husbands with a huge cast that included Jayasurya, Indrajith Sukumaran, Jayaram, Bhavana, Vandana Menon, Samvrutha Sunil and Rima Kallingal. Happy Husbands became the first major hit of 2010, and ran for more than 150 days at theatres throughout Kerala. Saji Surendran then directed Four Friends, starring Jayasurya, Jayaram, Kunchacko Boban, Meera Jasmine and Kamal Haasan in the guest role. It received mixed reviews.

== Filmography ==
Year	Name	Writer	Notes
2006	December Mist	G. A. Lal	Short film
2009	Ivar Vivahitharayal	Krishna Poojappura	Debut feature film
2010	Happy Husbands	Krishna Poojappura	Remake of Sakthi Chidambaram's Tamil film Charlie Chaplin.
2010	Four Friends	Krishna Poojappura	
2012	Kunjaliyan	Krishna Poojappura	
2012	Husbands in Goa	Krishna Poojappura	
2014	Angry Babies in Love	Krishna Poojappura	
2015	She Taxi	Krishna Poojappura	

As actor

- Oru Korean Padam (2014) as himself

=== Television ===
- Manasam (Asianet)
- Megham (Asianet)
- Aalippazham (Surya TV)
- Mandharam (Kairali TV)
- Madhavam (Surya TV)
- Ammakayi (Surya TV)
- Daya (Kairali TV)
- Manassinakkare (TV series) (Surya TV)
