= Jagapoga =

2001 film by Dhanwanthari

- Directed by: Dhanwanthari
- Written by: Dhanwanthari
- Produced by: Shan Kadavathur
- Starring: Suraj Venjaramoodu
- Cinematography: Bijoys
- Edited by: T.S Muthuraj
- Music by: M. G. Radakrishnan
- Distributed by: Kolothu Filims
- Release date: 2001
- Country: India
- Language: Malayalam

Jagapoga is a 2001 Indian Malayalam film directed by Dhanwanthari. This film is based on the show of the same name from Kairali TV.

== Plot ==
The film begins with an idol Lord Krishna, worth crores, being stolen from the Puthnambady Temple. Without a proper investigation, the temple priest Neelakandan Potty is blindly accused of the theft. Dada Sahib, a respected local freedom fighter, intervenes and demands that the police conduct a genuine investigation. Consequently, the police department assigns CIDs Ajayan and Vijayan from Madras to handle the case.

At the beginning of their investigation, Neelakandan is found dead. The investigation loses momentum as both CIDs become infatuated with Neelakandan's daughter, Abhirami. Meanwhile, Neelakandan's son, Hari falls into a state of shock, presumably because he witnessed his father's death. The CIDs attempt to help him recover, but the next day, Hari is also found dead inside the CIDs' accommodation. Fearing the severe consequences of the death occurring in their quarters, Ajayan and Vijayan flee and go into hiding.

Following the disappearance of the CIDs, Sethurama Kurup from the CBI, along with his assistant Binu Menon, takes over the case. Suspecting the CIDs of foul play, the CBI team aims to track them down and locate the stolen idol. Meanwhile, hiding in an abandoned warehouse, a starving Vijayan begins to kickbox out of sheer madness from hunger. His actions accidentally release Kuttappi, a genie. Kuttappi decides to join with the CIDs and offers to solve their troubles.

The real antagonist Chakravarty, targeting the CIDs, sends an assassin to eliminate them. However, Kuttappi uses his supernatural powers to kill the assassin instead. While on the run, the CIDs happen to discover gang with the stolen idol, but during the chase, they run into the CBI team, leading to a confrontation.

The conflict is abruptly interrupted by Dada Sahib, who takes the Abhirami hostage at gunpoint and demands the stolen idol. The idol is placed inside one of two bags, but a mix-up occurs, causing confusion over which bag actually contains the idol. Furthermore, Kuttappi is hiding inside one of the bags. From inside the bag, Kuttappi launches a surprise attack on Dada Sahib, triggering a frantic fight.

During the ensuing chaos and final altercation, the CIDs engage in a scuffle and unknowingly knock off Dada Sahib's cap and pull off his glued fake beard. This accidentally exposes the truth: the revered freedom fighter was actually a dual disguise. Underneath the Dada Sahib persona was Chakravarty, but the man behind both identities is revealed to be Ramanathan. He was the ultimate mastermind behind the idol theft and the person responsible for the murders of both Neelakandan and Hari. Ramanathan surrenders.

== Cast ==
- Murali
- Suraj Venjaramoodu as Dada Sahib, Prabhuthan,
- Unnikrishnan
- Suresh
- Kaladi Omana
- Kollam Thulasi
- Kumarakom Reghunath as SI of Police
- Mudavanmugal Krishnankutty
- Sangeetha Thampi
- Tharun Sagar as SI Ajayan
- Thirumala Chandran as Constable Vijayan
- Rajeev Kalamassery as Minister
- Raja Sahib as Thug, Panchayath Member
- Alencier Ley Lopez as Psychiatrist

== Reception ==
A critic from Sify wrote that "The film is based on a popular TV serial by the same name on Kairali TV. On the whole couple of look-alikes of popular stars do take-offs of the original creating a good laugh". A critic from Screen wrote hat "Anyhow, the film gives us some scope for introspection. We are forced to think, taking into consideration the story line, if most of the mainstream films being made here, sans the established stars, are not similar meaningfull [sic] stuff! Well, then after all it's good to see such films now and then. Isn't it?"
