= Ivar Vivahitharayal =

Ivar Vivahitharayal ?
- Directed by: Saji Surendran
- Written by: Krishna Poojappura
- Produced by: GNP
- Starring: Jayasurya; Bhama
- Cinematography: Anil Nair
- Edited by: Manoj
- Music by: M. Jayachandran
- Distributed by: GNP
- Release date: 12 June 2009
- Running time: 160 minutes
- Country: India
- Language: Malayalam

Ivar Vivahitharayal ? (transl. If they get married?) is a 2009 Malayalam language comedy drama film starring Jayasurya, Bhama, and Samvrutha Sunil in leading roles. Navya Nair appears in a cameo role in the film as Jayasurya's dream wife. The film is the directorial debut of Saji Surendran who has been a television serial director. The movie had a dream run at the box office.

== Plot ==
Vivek is getting his MBA from Pondicherry University. Even as a student, he is eager to get married as soon as he returns home after his studies. Vivek has a close circle of four friends Treesa, Francis, Jehangir and Pisharadi, with whom he discusses everything. His friends advises Vivek not to get married so early and until he finds a job, but Vivek has already made up his mind. Vivek's parents, Adv. Ananthan Menon and Nandini, lives separately at adjacent flats in the same building. Vivek returns home during holidays and stays at each of his parents' apartments on alternate days. He loves his parents very much and wishes to reunite them. A spoiled brat, Vivek, is addressed as Ananthuttan by his father Ananthan and Nanduttan by his mother Nandini.

Vivek's encounter through a phone-in program with Kavya alias Tinky, a radio jockey, results in the loss of her job. Some strange circumstances lead to Vivek and Kavya getting married, without them realizing that they are the same people who clashed on the FM radio channel. Vivek assumed that Kavya was an orthodox and simple wife of his dreams, however, she turns out to be otherwise. Vivek discovers on the first night of their marriage, that he was the reason that Kavya lost her job at the FM station. Vivek decided to reveal the truth to Kavya sometime in the future but he couldn't. Kavya gets rejected at other FM channels due to the notorious event at her previous FM station. Soon, Vivek finds that he did not pass his MBA exam and a subsequent quarrel with his father, leads to him getting distanced from his father's house. Vivek, now out of his own house, is without a job or money to survive. Treesa helps Vivek and Kavya rent a next door house to Treesa's. Vivek finds it difficult to carry out his responsibilities as a husband but is in denial about that.

Kavya doubts Treesa's friendliness towards Vivek is love and they are having a relationship, resulting in quarrels between them. She is also worried about Vivek's lack of responsibilities and care for her feelings. Kavya also discovers from Treesa that it was because of Vivek, that she lost her earlier job. Kavya decides to leave for her own house. However, she promises to stay with him and Vivek's parents who are reunited now. After a month, Vivek and Kavya file a joint divorce petition at the court. Vivek redoes his MBA exam and passes it, making his parents happy. Vivek plans to leave for Dubai, but they discover their emotions towards each other at the end of the film and all is well now.

== Cast ==
- Jayasurya as Vivek Ananthan/Ananthuttan/Nanduttan
- Siddique as Adv. Ananthan Menon, Vivek's father
- Rekha as Adv. Nandini Ananthan, Vivek's mother
- Bhama as Kavya, Vivek's wife
- Samvrutha Sunil as Treesa, Vivek's friend
- Nedumudi Venu as Freddy Uncle
- Suraj Venjarammoodu as Adv. Mannanthala Susheel Kumar
- Devan as Treesa's father
- Mallika Sukumaran as Treesa's mother
- Kalaranjini as Lakshmi, Kavya's mother
- Sidhartha Siva as Francis Kulirumkala, Vivek's friend
- Ashkar Saudan as Jehangir, Vivek's friend
- Baby Raihana as Annamma
- Shaju Sreedhar as Broker
- Anoop Menon as Ajay Menon, manager of Club FM channel (Special Appearance)
- Suresh Krishna as manager of MIF Group (Special Appearance)
- K. B. Ganesh Kumar as Jeevan, Freddy Uncle's son (Cameo appearance)
- Babu Swamy as Professor
- Kulappulli Leela as Fish seller
- Navya Nair as herself (Special Appearance)

== Production ==
Mahadevan Thampi is the still photographer of this movie.

== Soundtrack ==
- "Enikku Padanoru" - Sainoj
- "Poomukha Vathilkal" - Vijay Yesudas
- "Sunday Sooryan" - Tippu, Anand Narayan, Vipin Saviour, Sooraj, Charu Hariharan
- "Pazhmulam Thandil" - Ratheesh

== Box office ==
The film grossed ₹90 lakhs in its first week in the Kerala box office. The film was a commercial success.
