= Daivathinte Swantham Cleetus =

- Directed by: G. Marthandan
- Written by: Benny P Nayarambalam
- Produced by: Faisal Alleppy
- Starring: Mammootty; Siddique; Suraj Venjaramoodu; Honey Rose
- Cinematography: Pradeep Nair
- Edited by: Shyam Shashidar
- Music by: Bijibal
- Production company: Achappu Movie Magic
- Distributed by: Playhouse; Achappu, PJ Entertainments & PIANO Creations AUSTRALIA
- Release date: 12 September 2013
- Country: India
- Language: Malayalam
- Budget: ₹4.5 crore
- Box office: ₹12 crore

Daivathinte Swantham Cleetus is a 2013 Malayalam-language action comedy film directed by debutante director Marthandan and scripted by Benny P Nayarambalam. Set against the backdrop of theatre, Mammootty plays the title role of Cleetus, a theatre artiste and a gangster. Siddique, Suraj Venjaramoodu, and Honey Rose play other prominent roles in the film. It was released on 12 September 2013.

== Plot summary ==
Daivathinte Swantham Cleetus tells the story of a "thug" named Cleetus who is asked by a parish priest, Sibi Vadakkumthala who does not know about his background, to play the role of Jesus Christ in a play. During the film, events in the life of Cleetus start to mirror events portrayed about Jesus' life in the Bible.

== Cast ==
- Mammootty as Cleetus
- Siddique as Father Sibi Vadakkumthala
- Rejith Menon as Alex
- Honey Rose as Lakshmi
- Suraj Venjaramoodu as Kunjachan
- Aju Varghese as Chinnan
- Eric Anil as Manikuttan, Lakshmi's son
- Sanam Shetty as Anna
- Abu Salim as Udumbu Salim
- Vinayakan as Sayippu
- Anoop Chandran as Makri Jose
- Jubil Rajan P Dev as Podiyan
- Nandu as Ramabhadran, Lakshmi's Father
- Mohan Jose as S.I Ittichan
- Kottayam Nazeer as Vincent
- N. L. Balakrishnan as Kochappi
- Vijayaraghavan as Simon
- Jaise Jose as C.Krishnakumar
- Vishal Krishna as Jamon
- Ullas Pandalam
- Krishna Prasad
- Adinad Sasi
- Kailash as Jayakrishnan
- P. Balachandran as Raphael Vadakkumthala, Sibi's brother
- Maya Moushmi
- Thesni Khan as Kumbalangi Maria
- Manjusha Sajish
- Anoop Krishnan as Oommachan, Shopkeeper

== Reception ==
=== Critical reception ===
The film received mixed reviews upon release and was a super hit. Paresh C Palicha of Rediff.com rated the film 2/5 and said, "Fans of Mammootty will be happy with his performance, beginning with comedy, then moving to superhero action and culminating in emotionally intense scenes. But good acting is not enough to make up for a vapid plot and content." Padmakumar K. of Malayala Manorama rated the film 2.5/5 and said, "Just like any other director, debutant G Marthaandan has also made a film. He made it like a recipe with all the required ingredients in required measures. For a discerning connoisseur what it falls short of is the required taste." A critic from Oneindia.in rated the film 2.5/5 and said, "Daivathinte Swantham Cleetus can be regarded as a comedy entertainer. The first half of the movie is interesting". Aswin J. Kumar of The Times of India said, "Marthandan, as though overwhelmed by the sheer weight of the subject incorporates some light stuff, which eventually translates into poorly staged comic scenes." The reviewer criticised Mammootty's performance saying, "Mammootty carries off the thug and later the moralist with a palpable tiredness, which is worsened by a patchy make-up." Sharika C. of The Hindu said, "Tracing Cleetus’ transformation from evil to good, the film is a watchable fare. Does it mean resurrection for the superstar? Only, almost."

=== Box office ===
The film was a super hit It collected £4,6 at the UK box office in the first weekend, and US$20,305 from the second weekend, and ₹14.66 lakhs from third weekend (final run).

== Soundtrack ==
All lyrics are written by Rafeeq Ahamed; all music is composed by Bijibal.

No.	Title	Artist(s)	Length
1.	"Ithente Raktham"	Vijay Yesudas
2.	"Kizhak Kizhak"	Shahabaz Aman
3.	"Navayuga yavanika"	Ganesh Sundaram
