= Suraj Venjaramoodu =

Indian actor, comedian, impressionist, TV presenter (born 1976)

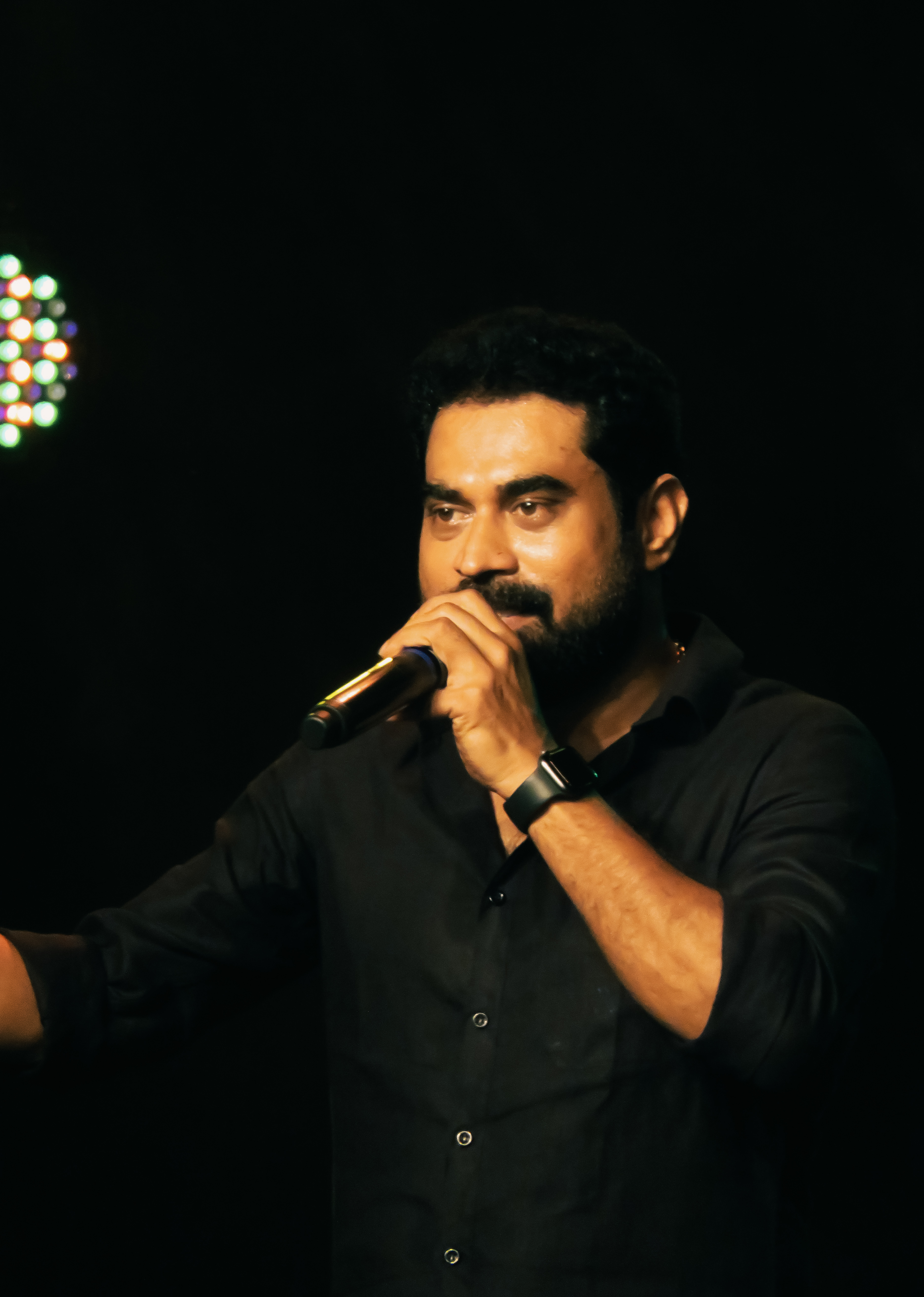
- Suraj in 2022
- Born: 30 June 1976 (age 50); Venjarammoodu, Thiruvananthapuram Kerala, India
- Education: Government ITI, Attingal
- Occupations: Actor; comedian; impressionist; television presenter
- Years active: 2000–present
- Works: Full list
- Spouse: Supriya Suraj (m. 2005)
- Children: 3
- Awards: National Film Award for Best Actor (2013); Kerala State Film Award for Best Actor (2019); Kerala State Film Award for Best Comedian (2009, 2010, 2013)

Suraj Vasudevan (born 30 June 1976), professionally credited as Suraj Venjaramoodu, is an Indian actor, comedian, impressionist, and television presenter, who appears in Malayalam films, television and stage plays. He has acted in more than 250 films. He has won a National Film Award and four Kerala State Film Awards. He also appeared in Tamil films.

Throughout the 2000s and towards mid-2010s, he played comedic roles in numerous films and won the Kerala State Film Award for Best Comedian three times (2009, 2010, 2013). In his later career, he found success in playing character and leading roles. In 2013, Suraj won the National Film Award for Best Actor for his lead role in Perariyathavar. In 2019, he won Kerala State Film Award for Best Actor for Android Kunjappan Version 5.25 and Vikruthi.

== Early life ==
Suraj is the youngest of the three children of Venjaramood K. Vasudevan Nair, a retired soldier from the Indian Army and Vilasini, a housewife. He was called "Kuttappan" by his parents and relatives. His elder brother V. Saji, was an officer in Indian Army. His sister Sunitha V. V. is married and settled in Thiruvananthapuram. Suraj also wanted to serve in the army after completing his Secondary School Leaving Certificate, but had to give up as he broke his arm in a bicycle accident. He received his primary education from K.V.M.L.P.S, Venjaramoodu. He completed his Mechanical diploma course from Government ITI, Attingal and turned to mimicry soon after. His breakthrough came with Jagapoka, a comedy program which was broadcast on Kairali TV.

== Film career ==
Suraj started his career as a stand-up comedian. His mimicry shows were a success with the audience and he was noted for his artificial mockery of the Thiruvananthapuram accent. Later, he was also criticised for this by some audience during his early film career. He first acted in a film named Jagapoga which was a spoof of Malayalam movies. He played the role of Pachan as well as Dadasahib in this film. However the movie was a box office flop and received negative reviews. Suraj then went on to act in several minor roles in films such as Rasikan, Achuvinte Amma, Bus Conductor and Rasathanthram. Suraj grabbed the attention in Malayalam film industry after he assisted Mammootty with the Thiruvananthapuram accent in Rajamanikyam (2005). He would go on to act alongside Mammootty in many comedy films. The duo is considered one of the most memorable onscreen duos in Malayalam cinema. His first breakthrough came with Thuruppugulan (2006) where he played the sidekick role for the character of Mammootty. Suraj then went on to play the comedy roles in several hit films such as Classmates, Pachakkuthira, Chotta Mumbai and Hallo. In 2007, he got his first major supporting role again in a Mammootty starrer Mayavi, which became another major breakthrough in his career. Suraj received appreciation for his role as Peethamparan in Annan Thambi and Jabbar in Lollipop, both of which released in 2008. He played the lead role for the first time with Duplicate (2009). Suraj's iconic comedy character Dasamoolam Damu came out with the movie Chattambinaadu (2009) starring Mammootty. The character became popular several years after the release of Chattambinaadu and eventually attained a cult status. He won his first Kerala State Film Award in 2009, by winning the award for the Best Comedian for his performance in Ivar Vivahitharayal. He won the award again two times in 2010 and 2013 for the movies Oru Naal Varum and Daivathinte Swantham Cleetus respectively. Suraj's another popular comedy character is Idivettu Sugunan which came out with Pokkiriraja (2010). He was also praised for his role as Vadivelu in the Dileep starrer comedy movie Karyasthan. Suraj played some memorable roles in the movies China Town and Teja Bhai & family, both released in 2011. His other memorable comedy roles came out with the movies such as Mallu Singh, Mr. Marumakan, 101 Weddings, Manthrikan, Sound Thoma, Pullipulikalum Aattinkuttiyum, Ring Master, Bhaiyya Bhaiyya, Cousins and Two Countries.

Suraj's potential to play the character and lead roles came out in 2013 as he won that year's National Award for his performance in Perariyathavar, at the 61st National Film Awards. Noted filmmaker and jury chairman Saeed Mirza, while announcing Suraj's award in a press meet, said: "Suraj has played a municipal sweeper [in the film] but it is an incredibly dignified performance. He excels in comedy but in this film Suraj has brilliantly played a reticent character. I would not have been able to sleep had his name not been in the list of awardees".

Suraj received critical appreciation for his acting with a potent cameo in Action Hero Biju (2016). This movie was also a turning point in his career and a breakthrough performance as he underwent a complete evolution with his acting. In Karinkunnam 6's, he portrayed a ruthless police officer and in Oru Muthassi Gadha, he played the lead role. Suraj returned to do the comedy role with the 2016 blockbuster Pulimurugan. In the movie Aby (2017) he played the character of a selfish neighbour. Suraj's another critically acclaimed performance came out with Thondimuthalum Driksakshiyum (2017), where he played a lead character alongside Fahad Fasil, who also received appreciation for his performance. He went on to play lead roles in Varnyathil Aashanka and Kuttanpillayude Sivarathri (2018). He bagged the Kerala State Film Award for the Best Actor in 2019 for his performance in Vikruthi and Android Kunjappan Version 5.25, both the films in which he played a lead role alongside Soubin Shahir. His performance in Driving License alongside Prithviraj also received appreciation. In 2021, Suraj played the lead role in The Great Indian Kitchen which received positive reactions from various film critics and was well received by the audience. In 2022, he played a pivotal role in Prithviraj starrer Jana Gana Mana which was critically acclaimed and was a commercial success.

== Personal life ==
In 2005, Suraj married Supriya at Vaikuntam Auditorium, near Padmanabhaswamy Temple. They have three children: Kashinathan, Vasudev and Hridya. Kashinathan has acted in the films Annan Thampi and Teja Bhai & Family.

An accident occurred on the Thammanam-Karanakodam road on the night of 29 July 2023 when Suraj was behind the wheel of a speeding car. The collision resulted in injuries to a bike rider, 31-year-old Sarath from Manjeri, who suffered a fracture in his right big toe along with injuries to other toes. Following this incident, in February 2024, the Kerala Motor Vehicles Department initiated actions to revoke/suspend his driving license. However, there are no confirmed reports of a suspension as of February 2026.

== Awards and nominations ==
Suraj Venjaramoodu awards and nominations
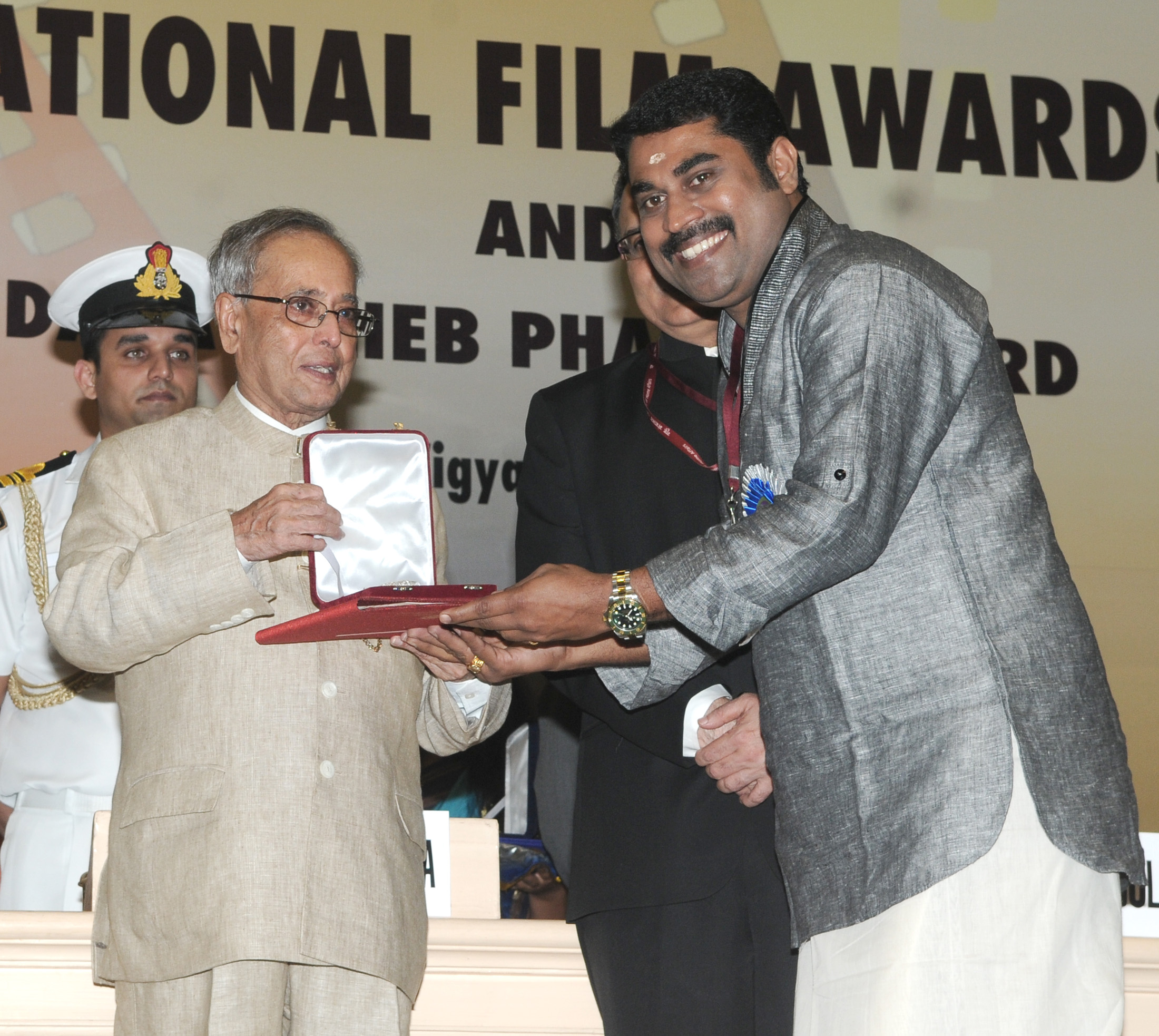
- The President, Pranab Mukherjee presenting the Rajat Kamal Award for Best Actor (for Perariyathavar) to Suraj Venjaramoodu, at the 61st National Film Awards function held at New Delhi on May 03, 2014
Awards and nominations
Award	Wins	Nominations

Totals (Note: Certain award groups do not simply award one winner. They acknowledge several different recipients, have runners-up, and have third place. Since this is a specific recognition and is different from losing an award, runner-up mentions are considered wins in this award tally. For simplification and to avoid errors, each award in this list has been presumed to have had a prior nomination.)
- Wins: 22
- Nominations: 26

List of Suraj Venjaramoodu awards and nominations
Award	Year	Category	Film	Result
National Film Awards	2013	Best Actor	Perariyathavar	Won
Kerala State Film Awards	2009	Best Comedian	Ivar Vivahitharayal	Won
Kerala State Film Awards	2010	Best Comedian	Oru Naal Varum	Won
Kerala State Film Awards	2013	Best Comedian	Daivathinte Swantham Cleetus; Pullipulikalum Aattinkuttiyum	Won
Kerala State Film Awards	2019	Best Actor	Vikruthi; Android Kunjappan Version 5.25	Won
South Indian International Movie Awards	2012	Best Actor in a Comedy Role (Malayalam)	Mr. Marumakan	Won
South Indian International Movie Awards	2013	Best Actor in a Comedy Role (Malayalam)	Pullipulikalum Aattinkuttiyum	Nominated
South Indian International Movie Awards	2017	Best Actor in a Supporting Role (Malayalam)	Thondimuthalum Driksakshiyum	Nominated
South Indian International Movie Awards	2019	Best Actor (Malayalam)	Vikruthi; Android Kunjappan Version 5.25	Nominated
South Indian International Movie Awards	2019	Best Actor in a Supporting Role (Malayalam)	Driving Licence; Finals	Nominated
CPC Cine Awards	2019	Best Actor in a Lead Role	Vikruthi; Android Kunjappan Version 5.25; Driving Licence; Finals	Won
North American Film Awards	2018	Best Supporting Actor	Thondimuthalum Driksakshiyum	Won
Asianet Film Awards	2007	Best Actor in Humorous Role	Hallo	Won
Asianet Film Awards	2010	Best Actor in Humorous Role	Various films	Won
Asianet Film Awards	2011	Best Actor in Humorous Role	Various films	Won
Asianet Film Awards	2014	Best Actor in Humorous Role	Cousins	Won
Asianet Film Awards	2017	Best Character Actor	Thondimuthalum Driksakshiyum	Won
Asianet Film Awards	2018	Best Character Actor	Theevandi; Njan Marykutty; Kuttanpillayude Sivarathri	Won
Asianet Film Awards	2019	Best Actor Critics Award	Android Kunjappan Version 5.25	Won
Vanitha Film Awards	2010	Best Comedian	Various films	Won
Vanitha Film Awards	2018	Best Supporting Actor	Thondimuthalum Driksakshiyum	Won
Vanitha Film Awards	2020	Special Performance (Actor)	Android Kunjappan Version 5.25; Driving Licence	Won
Asiavision Awards	2013	Best Comedian	Pullipulikalum Aattinkuttiyum; Daivathinte Swantham Cleetus	Won
Asiavision Awards	2017	Outstanding Performer Of the Year(male)	Thondimuthalum Driksakshiyum	Won
Asianet Comedy Awards	2016	Award for Multifaceted Talent	Various Films	Won
Asianet Comedy Awards	2017	Top TV Performer; All-time favorite of Media (TV)	Various TV Shows	Won
