= Jayaraj Vijay =

Indian film director

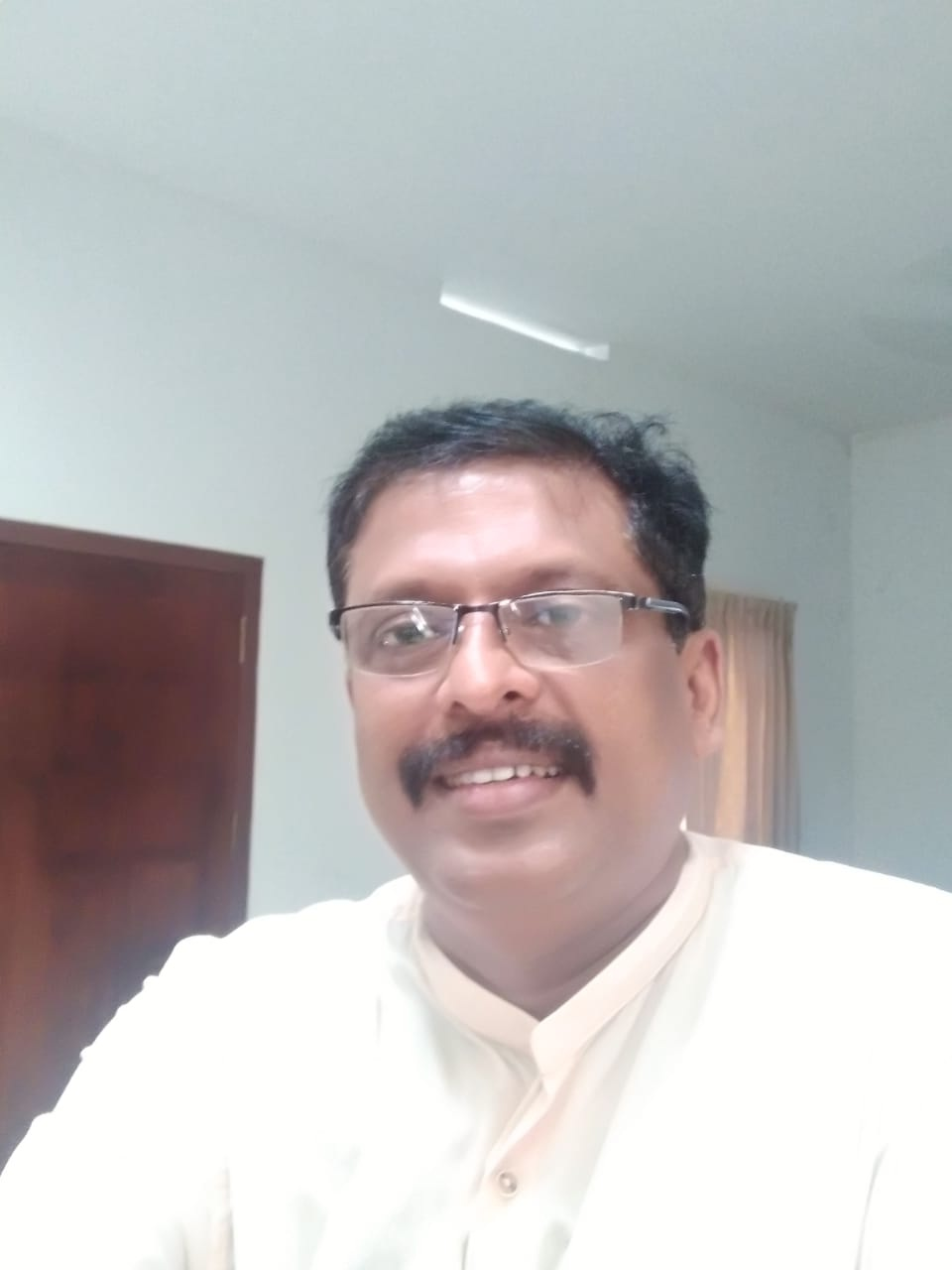
- Born: Udayamperoor, Ernakulam, Kerala
- Other names: Jayaraj
- Occupations: Film director screenwriter
- Years active: 1998-till date

Jayaraj Vijay is an Indian film director who is primarily working in Malayalam-language films. He made his debut with Shudharil Shudhan starring Indrans, and his second release Money Back Policy had Sreenivasan as the lead actor.

In 2015, he appeared with Shine Tom Chacko and veteran actor Shankar with Vishwasam... Athallae Ellaam.

Vijay won the 2016 Best Screenplay Kerala State Television Award for Pokkuveyil (TV series).

== Career ==
Vijay started his film career as scriptwriter for the unreleased film Priyam Priyankaram(2000), where he worked as the assistant director as well. Then he became the writer for the TV series Detective Anand. He also wrote many series like Oppol, Kaanakkinavu, Kanyadhaanam and Indraneelam for Surya TV. His other works includes Mounanombaram, (Kairali TV), Nirmalyam (Asianet), Sasneham (Amrita TV) and Indira in Mazhavil Manorama. He has also directed many advertisements as well as special programme for several TV Channels before his debut release Shudharil Shudhan.

Vijay also directed a serial Avaril Oraal for Surya TV, story by Bobby–Sanjay and produced by Listin Stephen.

== Filmography ==
Year	Date	Language	Film	Cast
2017–2018	Serial	Malayalam	Avaril Oraal	Sruthi Lakshmi, Sreejith Vijay, Rajani Chandy, Delna Davis
2015	31 July	Malayalam	Vishwasam... Athallae Ellaam	Shine Tom Chacko, Shankar, Ansiba Hassan
2013	21 June	Malayalam	Money Back Policy	Sreenivasan, Sarayu, Bhagath Manuel
2009	2 Sep	Malayalam	Shudharil Shudhan	Mukesh, Indrans, Kalabhavan Mani
