= Guinness Pakru =

Indian actor (born 1976)

- Born: Ajay Kumar; 31 August 1976 (age 49); Mulavana, Kundara, Kerala
- Other names: Ajayan, Unda Pakru
- Occupations: Actor; TV personality
- Years active: 1986–present
- Height: 76 cm (2 ft 6 in)
- Spouse: Gayathri Mohan (m. 2006)
- Children: 2
- Awards: Kerala State Film Awards; Tamil Nadu State Film Awards; Guinness World Records

Ajay Kumar (born 31 August 1976), better known as Guinness Pakru, is an Indian actor and television personality, who primarily works in Malayalam cinema, and some Tamil films. He has also served as a judge on several Malayalam television comedy shows. Standing at 2 ft 6 in (76 cm) tall, Pakru holds the Guinness World Records (2008) as the "shortest actor in a leading adult role" for his role in Athbhutha Dweepu (2005). In 2013, Pakru made his directorial debut with Kutteem Kolum.

== Early life ==
He was born Ajay Kumar, as the eldest son, of Radhakrishna Pillai and Ambujakshiyamma, on 31 August 1976. His father's home is in Mulavana, Kundara and Mother's is in Kottayam. His father was an auto driver and mother was an L.I.C agent who also worked at a telephone service agency on contract. Soon after his birth his family moved to Kottayam. Since his mother was often transferred they moved from one place to other and finally settled at Pandavam, Aymanam, Kerala. He has two younger sisters, Kavitha and Sangeetha.

He studied at C.M.S L.P School, Chalukunnu until fourth grade and at C.M.S High School, Olassa until S.S.L.C. Then he joined Baselius College, Kottayam and completed his pre degree and graduation from there. He is a BA graduate in economics and has a diploma in computer science.

== Career ==
After finishing college, he began performing kadhaprasangam professionally, touring across Kerala. One of the people who booked him during that time was Salim Kumar, who told him to try comedy. This was when mimicry was gaining popularity in Kerala. He began blending mimicry with his kadhaprasangam acts, which proved to be successful, and he gradually shifted entirely to mimicry. Later, he joined the mimicry troupe Mangalam Mimics, headlined by Kottayam Nazir. When Nazir formed his own troupe, Cochin Discovery, around 1998–1999, he joined that as well. During this period, they performed around 150 shows per season, with Jayasurya also being part of the troupe. His success on stage led to opportunities on television, where he appeared in comedy shows like Cinemala and Oru Vadakkan Hasya Gaadha.

He debuted through the children's film Ambili Ammavan in 1984. He has also acted in television serials.

He formed a successful comedy duo with the tall comedian Tini Tom, and together they appeared in several TV comedy shows, including Savari Giri Giri and Vallabhan c/o Vallabhan. Their performances caught the attention of director Vinayan, who was reminded of the story of Gulliver in Lilliput, inspiring him to create the film Athbhutha Dweepu (2005). The film follows the story of four men stranded on an island inhabited by dwarfs. His role in the film earned him the Kerala State Film Award – Special Mention. The success of Athbhutha Dweepu opened doors for him in Tamil cinema, where he made his debut in Dishyum (2006), starring Jiiva. His performance earned him a Tamil Nadu State Film Award Special Prize. In 2008, Pakru entered the Guinness World Records as the "shortest actor in a leading adult role" for his role in Athbhutha Dweepu, standing at (2 ft 6 in (76 cm)).

Pakru became a director with the 2013 Malayalam film Kutteem Kolum, in which he also played the lead role. The film also featured Aditya, Sanusha, Laya, Munna, Suraj Venjaramoodu, Vijayaraghavan and Ponnamma Babu.

== Personal life ==
Pakru married Gayathri Mohan 9 March 2006. They have two daughters.

== Accolades ==
Guinness World Records

- Guinness Book of Records (2008 edition) - shortest actor in a leading adult role

Kerala State Film Awards

- Kerala State Film Award – Special Mention (2006) - Athbhutha Dweepu

Tamil Nadu State Film Awards

- Tamil Nadu State Film Award Special Prize (2006) - Dishyum
- Movie Street Film Awards (2020)-Best Actor- Special Jury (Ilayaraja)

== Filmography ==
=== As actor ===
==== Malayalam ====
Year	Title	Role	Notes
1986	Ambili Ammavan	Undapakru	
1987	Itha Samayamayi	Unnamed character	
1989	Antharjanam	Pakru	
2000	Joker	Joker	
2002	Basket		
2002	Kunjikoonan	Suhasini	
2002	Meesa Madhavan	Tea Boy	
2003	Malsaram	Induchoodan	
2005	Athbhutha Dweepu	Prince Gajendran	Kerala State Film Award (Special Jury Award)
2005	Maanikyan	Watchman	
2006	Kilukkam Kilukilukkam	Nilagiri Neelakandan	
2007	Athisayan	Ramu	
2008	Mulla	Chandran	
2008	Twenty:20	Worker in Tea shop	
2009	Ee Pattanathil Bhootham	Balan	
2009	Sivapuram		
2009	Puthiya Mukham	Canteen Rajan	
2009	Loudspeaker	Agent	
2010	Body Guard	Kudamaloor Balaji	
2010	My Big Father	Kunjumon	
2010	Swantham Bharya Zindabad	Vettoor Sivankutty	
2011	Note Out		
2011	Payyans	Japan Babu	
2011	Venicile Vyapari	Kochukrishnan	
2011	Rathinirvedam		
2011	Killadi Raman	Bada Bhai	
2012	Snake & Ladder		
2012	Perinoru Makan	Murugan	
2013	My Fan Ramu	Banker Pappan	
2013	Housefull	Dr. Shenayi	
2013	Kutteem Kolum	Vinayakan	
2013	Immanuel	Kannadi Kavi Shivan	
2013	Abhiyum Njanum	Veerabhadran	
2014	Ring Master	Sathyavel Bachankunju	
2014	Polytechnic	Biju	
2015	6	Vedalam	
2015	3 Wicketinu 365 Runs		
2017	Punyalan Private Limited	Bank Manager	
2019	Ilayaraja	Vanajan	
2019	Fancy Dress	Dikru/Ben	
2019	Mr. Pavanayi 99.99		
2020	Veerapakru		
2024	Kudumbasthreeyum Kunjadum		
2025	916 Kunjoottan	Sidharth	

==== Tamil ====
Year	Title	Role	Notes
2006	Dishyum	Amitabh	Tamil Nadu State Film Award (Special Prizes)
2007	Arputha Theevu	Kajendran	
2009	Thalai Ezhuthu	Kirthik	
2011	Kaavalan	Meera's friend	
2011	7 Aum Arivu	Aravind's friend	
2012	Ariyaan		
2023	Bagheera	Pakru	
2025	Aghathiyaa	House broker	

=== As director ===
- Kuttiyum Kolum (2013)

=== As producer ===
- Fancy Dress' (2019)

== Television ==
Serials

- Savari Girigiri (Surya TV)
- Tom and Jerry (Asianet)
- Vallabhan C/O Vallabhan
- Cinemala (Asianet)
- Five Star Thattukada (Asianet)
- Ente Maathavu (Surya TV)
- Erivum Puliyum (Zee Keralam)

Shows

- Chirikum Pattanam (Kairali TV)
- Comedy Festival (Mazhavil Manorama)
- Pokeeri Peekiri (Asianet Plus)
- Kuttykalavara (Flowers TV)
- Komedy Circus (Mazhavil Manorama)
- Comedy Utsavam (Flowers)
- Thakarppan Comedy (Mazhavil Manorama)
- Midumidukki (Flowers TV channel)
- Top Singer (Flowers TV)
- Music Ulsavam (Flowers TV)
- Comedy masters (Amrita TV)
- Comedy Utsavam 3 (Flowers TV)
- Drama juniors ( Zee Keralam)
