= Mohandas =

Mohandas may refer to:

== People ==
- Mohandas Karamchand Gandhi or Mahatma Gandhi (1869–1948), major political and spiritual leader of India
- Achuth Mohandas, Indian writer in both English and Malayalam and a radio jockey
- Geetu Mohandas (born 1981), Indian actress
- Mamta Mohandas (born 1985), Indian actress
- P. M. K. Mohandas (1948–2004), Indian cricketer
- P. V. A. Mohandas, Indian orthopedic surgeon

== Other uses ==
- Mohandas (2008 film), a Hindi drama film by Mazhar Kamran
- Mohandas (2019 film), Indian biographical film about the childhood of Mahatma Gandhi in English, Hindi and Kannada and directed by P. Sheshadri
- Mohandas B.A.L.L.B., Indian TV show broadcast on Zee TV in 1997–1998

== See also ==
- Muhandes (disambiguation)
