= Virginia Rodrigues =

Virginia Rodrigues may refer to:

- Virginia Rodrigues (singer), Brazilian singer
- Virginia Rodrigues (actress), Indian actress and author
