= Nayanthara Chakravarthy =

Indian actress (born 2002)

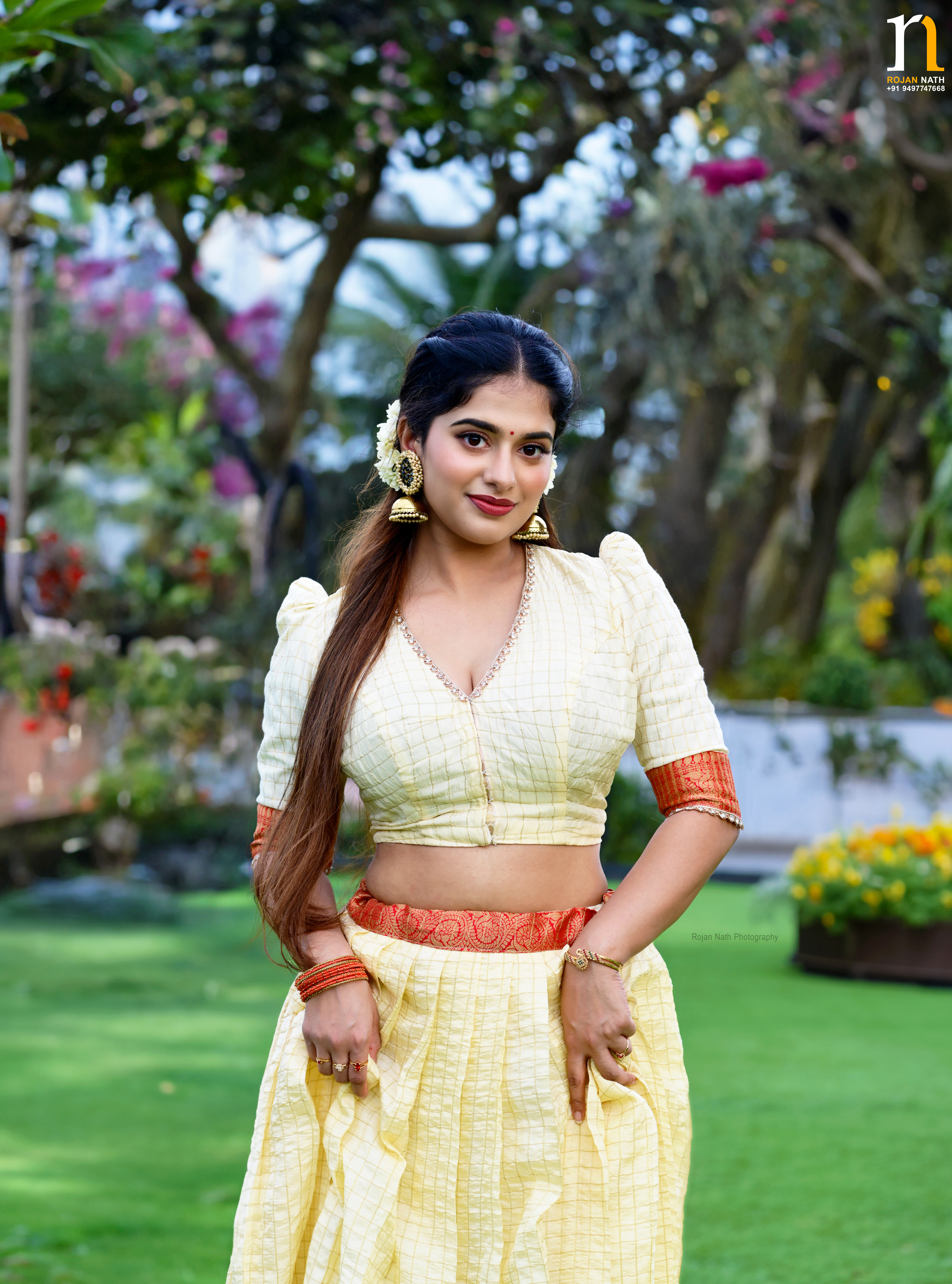
- Born: 20 April 2002 (age 24); Thiruvananthapuram, Kerala, India
- Other name: Kutty Nayan
- Occupation: Actress
- Years active: 2005–2016
- Parents: Maninath Chakravarthy; Bindu Maninath
- Awards: See Awards

Nayanthara Chakravarthy (born 20 April 2002), also known as Baby Nayanthara, is an Indian actress who works in Malayalam cinema. She established herself as a child actress. Nayanthara made her acting debut in the Malayalam film Kilukkam Kilukilukkam in 2005, for which she won the “Sathyan Memorial Award” for the Best Child Artist in 2006.

== Early life and education ==
Nayanthara, born on 20 April 2002 in Thiruvananthapuram district of Kerala, is the daughter of Maninath Chakravarthy and Bindu Maninath. She has a younger brother, Ayaan Chakravarthy. She started her acting career at the age of 3. She studied at Christ Nagar School, Thiruvananthapuram till class 2 after which, she moved to Kochi where she finished her schooling in The Choice School, Thrippunithura.

== Career ==
Nayanthara's notable works include Kilukkam Kilukilukkam, Swarnam, Loud Speaker, Trivandrum Lodge, Marupadi. She has appeared several commercials including The Chennai Silks, RMKV Silks and Silver Storm Parks.

== Awards ==
List of film awards received by Nayanthara Chakravarthy
Year	Award	Category	Film
2006	Sathyan Memorial Award	Best Child Artist	Kilukkam Kilukilukkam
2008	Atlas - Film Critics Award	Best Child Artist	Swarnam
2009	Mathrubhumi Amrita Award	Best Child Artist	Swarnam
2009	Jaycee Foundation Award	Best Child Artist	Loudspeaker
2009	Jeevan Minnalai Award	Best Child Artist	Loudspeaker
2015	IFA Awards (Dubai)	Best Child Artist in 10 Years	Various films

== Filmography ==
- All films are in Malayalam, unless otherwise noted.

List of film credits
Year	Title	Role
2006	Kilukkam Kilukilukkam	Tinku Mol
2006	Achanurangatha Veedu	Nayana
2006	Chess	Achu
2006	Notebook	Student
2007	Athisayan	Kingini
2007	Kanaka Simhasanam	Ammukutty
2007	Inspector Garud	Grand Daughter of Raghavan
2007	Aakasham	Mayakutty
2007	Sooryan	Sooryan's niece
2007	Kangaroo	Josekutty's Niece
2008	Twenty:20	Antony Punnekkadan's Daughter
2008	Novel	Thara
2008	Swarnam	Ponnu
2008	Thirakkatha	Shalini
2008	Crazy Gopalan	Babu John's Daughter
2009	Bhagavan	Sreenath's Daughter
2009	Ee Pattanathil Bhootham	Ammukutty
2009	Loudspeaker	Angela
2011	Nadakame Ulakam	Omanakuttan's Daughter
2011	Collector	Avinash Varma's Daughter
2011	Naayika	Anand's Adopted Daughter
2012	Trivandrum Lodge	Amala
2012	Poppins	Chakki
2013	Silence	Arya
2014	Little Superman	Serah
2015	Aval Vannathinu Shesham	Devu
2016	Marupadi	Riya (Aby's daughter)
