= Little Superman =

2014 superhero film directed by Vinayan

- Theatrical release poster
- Directed by: Vinayan
- Written by: Vinayan
- Produced by: Vinayan
- Starring: Deni Emmanuel Jacklin; Nayanthara Chakravarthy; Ansiba Hassan; Praveena; Ranjith
- Cinematography: K G Ratheesh
- Edited by: Sanil
- Music by: Gopi Sundar
- Production company: Akash Films
- Release date: 7 November 2014 (India)
- Running time: 140 minutes
- Country: India
- Language: Malayalam

Little Superman is a 2014 Indian Malayalam-language superhero film written and directed by Vinayan, starring Deni Emmanuel Jacklin, Nayanthara Chakravarthy, Ansiba Hassan, Praveena and Ranjith in the lead roles. The film was inspired by the superhero character Superman.

== Premise ==
Willy Wilson, a 12 year old comic book aficionado, falls into a manhole and gets trapped inside it for days and soon figures out that he has the ability to fly and lift things up with the help of telekinesis.

== Cast ==
- Deni Emmanuel Jacklin as Willy Wilson
- Nayanthara Chakravarthy as Serah
- Ansiba Hassan as Angel Wilson, Willy's sister
- Praveena as Jeny Wilson, Willy's mother
- Ranjith as Wilson George, Willy's father
- Madhu as Father
- Krishna as Circle Inspector Shivan
- Saju Navodaya as Father Verunthara
- Nizhalgal Ravi as Albert
- Girish Nambiar as Hareesh

== See also ==
- Superhero film
