= Mahira (film) =

2019 Indian Kannada crime-action film

- Official poster
- Directed by: Mahesh Gowda
- Screenplay by: Prashanth P M Mahesh Gowda
- Story by: Mahesh Gowda
- Produced by: Vivek Kodappa
- Starring: Raj B. Shetty; Virginia Rodrigues; Chaithra Achar
- Cinematography: Keertan Poojary
- Edited by: Ashik Kusugolli
- Music by: Nilima Rao; Rakesh UP
- Production company: The Jackfruit Productions
- Distributed by: Sai Sidhi Productions
- Release date: 26 July 2019
- Country: India
- Language: Kannada

Mahira is a 2019 Indian Kannada-language crime action film written and directed by Mahesh Gowda and produced by Vivek Kodappa and his friends under the banner The Jackfruit Productions. It features Raj B. Shetty and Virginia Rodrigues along with Chaithra J Achar in the lead roles. The soundtrack of the film is composed by rapper Nilima Rao and Rakesh U.P and the cinematography is by Keerthan Poojary. The editing for the film is done by Ashik Kusugolli. The film released on 26 July 2019.

== Plot ==
Maya is a single mother who runs a café. Her daughter Adya is a middle school student who frequently gets into fights with other students despite being a topper in academics. One day, Adya is selected for a media interview for her outstanding school performance. During the interview, the journalist also asks for a photograph of Maya so they can write about Adya's upbringing.

However, after the article featuring Maya's photograph is published, it catches the attention of the intelligence department, which has been searching for a wanted criminal named Devaki for several years. Later, while Maya is working at her café, a group of men arrive claiming to be police officers. They address Maya as Devaki and attempt to arrest her. Maya refuses to cooperate and instead fights them off using professional combat skills, shocking Adya. Realizing her identity has been exposed, Maya escapes with Adya.

Maya and Adya take refuge at the residence of Kashi, Maya's former colleague. Maya and Kashi then reveal the truth to Adya.

Maya’s real name is Devaki, and she was once a field agent in the intelligence department. Her late husband Kishore was also her colleague. A few years earlier, Devaki and Kishore were assigned to investigate Thousif, a money launderer with terrorist connections. During a raid on Thousif’s hideout, Thousif shot Kishore dead. Before Devaki killed him in retaliation, Thousif contacted Devaki’s chief and falsely accused Devaki of murdering Kishore and attempting to kill him despite his willingness to surrender and become an informer.

Unable to prove her innocence, Devaki went into hiding. The department subsequently declared her a rogue agent who had murdered her husband during the operation and escaped with sensitive evidence obtained from Thousif that could expose several unknown criminals.

Devaki's case is assigned to officer Pratap. The department eventually tracks down Devaki and Adya's location and attempts to apprehend them, but they escape once again. It is also revealed that a criminal group is pursuing Devaki in addition to the intelligence department.

The department learns that Devaki is heading to Bengaluru and assumes she intends to assassinate her retired chief, under whom she once served. The chief had earlier authorized her arrest, believing she had killed Kishore. However, Devaki visits him not to seek revenge, but to ask for help in clearing her name. Before the chief can assist her, a sniper shoots him dead. The blame once again falls on Devaki, further convincing the department of her guilt.

Devaki is later arrested by the police. During interrogation, she tells Pratap that she intentionally allowed herself to be captured in order to personally convince him of her innocence. Soon afterward, Devaki escapes from police custody. Her words begin to affect Pratap, who reviews the old case files and notices several inconsistencies. He questions his current chief Patil, who had testified as an eyewitness against Devaki during the original investigation. Patil dismisses Pratap's concerns and orders him to focus solely on arresting Devaki, causing Pratap to grow suspicious of him.

Meanwhile, Devaki and Kashi continue investigating Thousif's network and discover that he owned a bank locker. Devaki gains access to it by posing as Thousif's widow and retrieves a USB drive hidden inside.

Soon afterward, the criminal group pursuing Devaki kidnaps Adya and demands the USB drive in exchange for her release. Devaki manages to rescue Adya after killing the kidnappers. During the confrontation, it is revealed that Adya is actually Thousif's daughter. After killing Thousif years earlier, Devaki had adopted and raised Adya as her own child.

Devaki examines the contents of the USB drive and discovers transaction records connected to several criminals previously unknown to the authorities, including Patil himself.

Devaki later contacts Pratap and offers to surrender. Pratap agrees and heads to the meeting location. However, Patil arrives before him, shoots Devaki, and seizes the USB drive. Patil later attempts to sell the drive to a terrorist associate, but he is caught red-handed and arrested by his own department.

It is then revealed that Devaki's surrender had been part of a plan devised by her and Pratap, who knew Patil was tapping their conversation and would attempt to intervene. Devaki had faked her death during the confrontation. With Patil exposed, Devaki's name is finally cleared.

== Cast ==
- Virginia Rodrigues as Maya/Devaki
- Raj B. Shetty as Pratap, undercover agent
- Chaithra J Achar as Adya
- Balaji Manohar
- Gopalkrishna Deshpande as Kashi
- K P Sridhar
- Babu Hirannaiah
- Apoorva Soma Saakre
- Shaukat Ali
- Dileep Raj as Kishore

== Soundtrack ==
Mahira

Soundtrack album by Nilima Rao & Rakesh U P (RaknNili)
- Released: 2019|02|09
- Genre: Feature film soundtrack
- Language: Kannada
- Label: PRK Audio
- Producers: Nilima Rao & Rakesh U P (RaknNili)

The film's background score is done by Midhun Mukundhan . The soundtracks are composed by Nilima Rao & Rakesh U P (RaknNili). The music rights were acquired by PRK Audio.

Tracklist
No.	Title	Lyrics	Singer(s)	Length
1.	"Theera Mouna"	Pratap Bhatt	Deepak Doddera	3:39
2.	"Yendu Helada"	Vishwajith Rao	Nilima Rao	3:23
3.	"Naanu Nanena"	Vishwajith Rao	Pooja. B. S	4:42
4.	"Nannella Kanasu"	Pratap Bhatt	Nikita Bharadwaj	3:12

== Release and reception ==
The movie released on 26 July 2019 worldwide across 80 centres. It premiered on 24 July 2019 in London.

=== Critical reception ===
Jagadish Angadi of Deccan Herald rated the film 4/5 stars and wrote, "Each frame is a visual treat. The many edge-of-the-seat moments in Mahira are admirably balanced by the emotional scenes. The viewers are never let down and are kept hooked to the story, be it with suspense or sentiment." Shyam Prasad S. of Bangalore Mirror gave the film 3/5 stars and wrote, "There isn’t a loose end and the screenplay sits tight in what the director attempts to do. The film is technically sound even if it is sometimes hard to connect with the story emotionally."

A. Sharadhaa of The New Indian Express gave it 3/5 stars and wrote, "A female-centric film, this suspense thriller is Mahesh’s first attempt at an action-packed emotional drama, highly influenced by Hollywood films." Shashiprasad S. M. of The Asian Age wrote, "Despite a few shortcomings, Mahira guarantees the audience a change that they will not regret but commend the efforts for a brave attempt in the end." Aravind Shwetha of The News Minute wrote, "Though the actors have performed well, the film falls back on a predictable formula."
