= Muhandes =

Muhandes (Arabic: مهندس) meaning "engineer" in Arabic and its variants like Muhandis, Mohandes, Mohandis etc. may refer to:

- Abu Mahdi al-Muhandis (1954–2020), Iraqi politician and military commander
- Majid al-Muhandis or al-Muhandes (born 1971), Iraqi singer and composer
- Mohammed Mohandis or Mo Muhandes (born 1985), Moroccan-Dutch politician

== See also ==
- Mohandessin, an area in Agouza, Giza, Egypt
- Alamabad-e Mohandes, a village in Khuzestan Province, Iran
- Al Muhandis, the nickname of the Palestinian bombmaker Yahya Ayyash (1966–1996)
- Mohandas (disambiguation)
