= Isakkinte Ithihasam =

- Official poster
- Directed by: R. K. Ajayakumar
- Produced by: Ayyappan
- Starring: Siddique; Bhagath Manuel
- Cinematography: T. D. Sreenivas
- Edited by: Samjith Mohammed
- Music by: Gopi Sundar
- Distributed by: UMC
- Release date: 30 August 2019
- Country: India
- Language: Malayalam

Isakkinte Ithihasam (English:The Epic of Isak) is a 2019 Comedy-Suspense-Drama Malayalam Film directed by R. K. Ajayakumar under the banner of Uma Maheshwara Creations Produced by Ayyappan R. It was written by Subash and R. K. Ajayakumar, with music by Gopi Sundar and cinematography by T. D. Sreenivas. It stars Siddique, who plays the title role of Isak and the story happens in the picturesque village of Thodupuzha. The film was released on 30 August 2019.

== Cast ==
- Siddique as Isak
- Ashokan
- Bhagath Manuel
- Kalabhavan Shajohn
- Saju Navodaya
- Nelson
- Sasi Kalinga
- Sunidhi
- Sona Heiden
- Naseer Sankranthi
