= Marupadi =

- Theatrical release poster
- Directed by: V. M. Vinu
- Written by: Julaina Ashraf
- Produced by: Ashraf Bedi
- Starring: Rahman; Bhama; Nayanthara Chakravarthy
- Cinematography: Venugopal Madathil
- Edited by: K. R. Midhun
- Music by: Gopi Sundar
- Production company: Bedi Motion Pictures
- Distributed by: Ullattil Visual Media
- Release date: 9 December 2016
- Running time: 132 minutes
- Country: India
- Language: Malayalam

Marupadi (transl. Reply) is a 2016 Indian Malayalam-language drama film directed by V. M. Vinu. It stars Rahman, Bhama and Nayanthara Chakravarthy in the lead roles. The film is produced by Ashraf Bedi under the banner of Bedi Motion Pictures. The film was released on 9 December 2016.

== Synopsis ==
The film is inspired by a real-life incident from northern India and follows a family whose lives are upended after becoming entangled in the criminal justice system. It centres on Aby, a bank employee, his wife Sara, an orphan, and their teenage daughter Riya, who lead a quiet and contented life.

Following workplace-related issues, Aby is transferred to Kolkata as a disciplinary measure. While travelling to their new residence, the family's vehicle is stopped by an anti-narcotics squad, which claims to have discovered illegal drugs in the car. As a result, the family is arrested and remanded to custody.

While in prison, Sara and Riya face harassment and abuse from both police personnel and fellow inmates. Through the family's experiences, the film examines the consequences of abuse of authority and shortcomings within the legal and social systems. It also explores the vulnerabilities faced by women and children within the criminal justice system.

== Cast ==
- Rahman as Abraham "Aby"
  - Aakash Santhosh as Young Aby
- Bhama as Sara Elizabeth Abraham, Aby's wife
  - Meenakshi aa Young Sara
- Nayanthara Chakravarthy as Riya Abraham, Aby's daughter
  - Anu Sithara as Adult Riya (cameo appearance)
- Santosh Keezhattoor as Aby's friend
- Arjun Nandhakumar as Vijay
- Virginia Rodrigues as Psychiatrist
- Tessa Joseph
- Srinda Ashab
- Valsala Menon
- Janardhanan
- Shivaji Guruvayoor
- M.G. Sasi
- Krishna Kumar
- Devan
- Sudip Mukherjee

== Soundtrack ==
The soundtrack for the film was composed by M. Jayachandran and the background score was scored by Gopi Sundar, with lyrics penned by Rafeeq Ahamed.

Marupadi
- DVD cover

Soundtrack album by M. Jayachandran
- Released: 21 November 2016
- Genre: Feature film Soundtrack
- Length: 12:38
- Language: Malayalam
- Label: Millennium audios

M. Jayachandran chronology
Mohavalayam (2016)	Marupadi (2016)	Munthirivallikal Thalirkkumbol (2017)

=== Track listing ===
All music is composed by M. Jayachandran.

No.	Title	Singer(s)	Length
1.	"Ee Poovithal"	M. Jayachandran	3:59
2.	"Melle Vannupoyi"	Varsha Vinu	4:25
3.	"Ponjilanji Chottile"	Shweta Mohan	4:14
Total length:			12:38

== Reception ==
Deepa Soman for The Times of India stated, "With its fair share of pitfalls and loopholes, our legal justice system has been existing in our midst, to make important decisions on people lives, for long. When women are at its receiving end, the system gets a lot more skewed. Marupadi, a film by V.M. Vinu, typifies such a frightful situation, demanding some scary answers and solutions if any". Filmihood.com rated the movie 3 out of 5.
