= Vishwasam Athallae Ellaam =

- Promotional Poster
- Directed by: Jayaraj Vijay
- Produced by: Benjamin Antony Chirayath; Babu Varghese Adoor; Shajeer K
- Starring: Shine Tom Chacko; Shankar; Ansiba Hassan; Archana Jayakrishnan; Manoj.K.Jayan; Kalabhavan Shajon; Sunil Sukhada; Shan Vahab
- Release date: 31 July 2015
- Running time: 135 minutes
- Country: India
- Language: Malayalam

Vishwasam Athallae Ellaam (transl. Trust Is Everything) is a 2015 Indian Malayalam-language film directed by Jayaraj Vijay. Produced by Benjamin Antony Chirayath, Babu Varghese Adoor, and Shajeer K through the production house Flowers Creation, starring Shine Tom Chacko, Ansiba Hassan and veteran actor Shankar. The film was released on 31 July 2015.

== Summary ==
Vishwasam Athallae Ellaam is the story of Jomon, an easygoing young man played by Shine Tom Chacko, and his frequent conflicts with his father Luka, a strict police commissioner played by Shankar. Jomon is a spoiled brat, who doesn't know how to lead a practical and successful life. He believes that a person can amass wealth only using intelligence. He is entrusted with a task that can make his ambition a reality, but his lack of knowledge in practical life lands him in several troubles.

== Cast ==
- Shine Tom Chacko as Jomon
- Shankar as A.S.I Lucose
- Ansiba Hassan as Seline
- Archana Jayakrishnan as Rose
- Kalabhavan Niyas as Maniyan
- Manoj.K.Jayan as A.C.P Prithyraj Singh I.P.S
- Kalabhavan Shajon
- Sunil Sukhada
- Indrans
- Bhagath Manuel
- Vijayaraghavan as Divakaran

== Reception ==
The Times of India rated the film at two stars, calling it "a disaster that slips into a B-grade comedy."
