= Shudharil Shudhan =

- Directed by: Jayaraj Vijay
- Produced by: Joy Jacob
- Starring: Indrans; Kalabhavan Mani
- Cinematography: K.P Nambyathiri
- Music by: Jaison J. Nair
- Release date: 2 September 2009
- Country: India
- Language: Malayalam

Shudharil Shudhan is a 2009 Malayalam-language film by debutant director Jayaraj Vijay, starring Mukesh, Kalabhavan Mani and Indrans.

The film is about an estate worker named Ramankutty (Indrans) who is forced to lead a strike against the estate management, leaving his family in starvation.

== Cast ==
- Mukesh as Mohanachandran Pilla
- Lakshmi Sharma as Janaki
- Indrans as Ramankunju
- Kalabhavan Mani as Sankarankutty
- Sudheesh as Chandran
- Sai Kumar as Joseph
- Mamukkoya as Jabbar
- Maniyanpilla Raju as Kanaran
- T. G. Ravi as Patta Krishnan
- Kollam Thulasi as Fernandez
- Geetha Vijayan as Ramani
- Sona Nair as Panki
- Manasi

== Songs ==
The film has five songs which were composed by Jaison J. Nair. The songs were written by Vayalar Sarath Chandra Varma and Inchakkadu Balachandran.

Song	Singer(s)	Lyrics
"Kanpeeliyil"	Sujatha Mohan	Vayalar Sarath Chandra Varma
"Puzha Paadum Thazhvaaram"	Sangeetha Prabhu	Vayalar Sarath Chandra Varma
"Ennum Ormakal"	Jaison J. Nair	Inchakkadu Balachandran
"Ayyayya"	Jaison J. Nair	Inchakkadu Balachandran
"Kanpeeliyil"	G. Venugopal	Vayalar Sarath Chandra Varma
