= Mulavana Mahadevar Temple =

Hindu Temple in Mulavana, Kerala

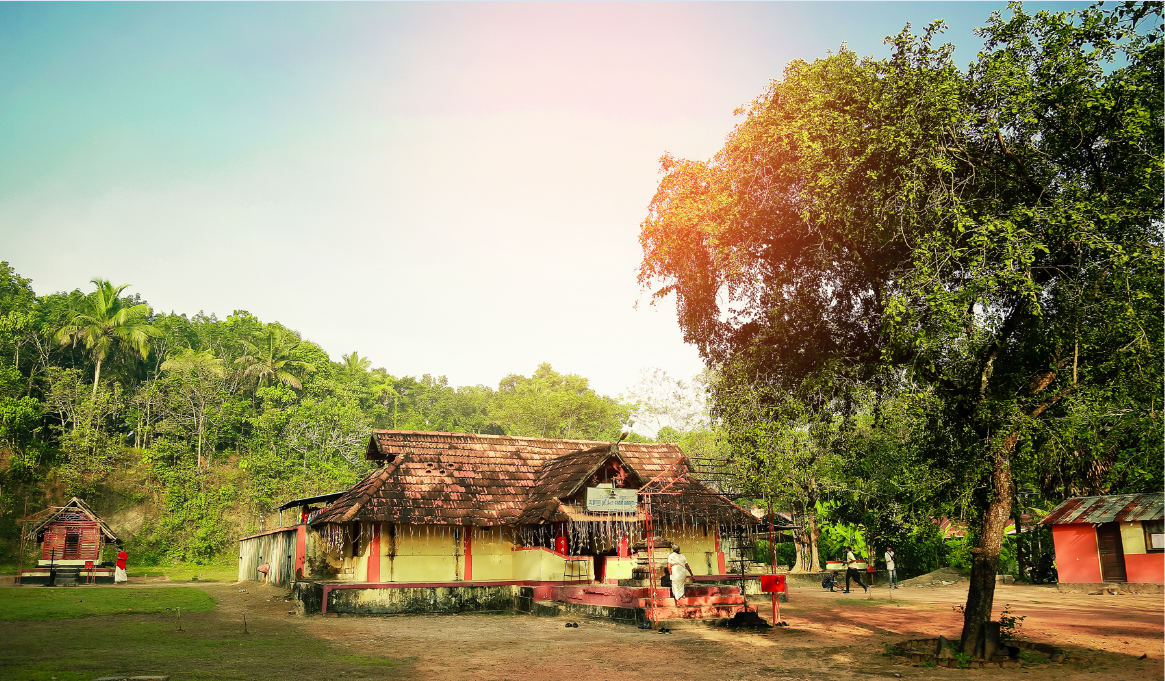
Mulavana Mahadevar Temple

Mulavana Mahadevar Temple or Sree Mahadevar Temple is a temple in the village of Mulavana, Kerala in southern India, managed by the Mulavana Mahadevar Devaswom. The temple is the principal place of worship for Mulavana and neighboring areas; it is open to the public, and people are free to enter and worship. The Kadalayi Mana had hereditary rights for managing the affairs of the temple and its property.

The temple hosts a festival for Maha Shivaratri in the month of Kumbham (February/March). The day is important for the people of Mulavana and neighboring villages, and is celebrated irrespective of caste or religion.

Deities enshrined in the temple include Sastha, Ganapathi, Yakshiyamma, and Nagaraja, as well as the lord Mahadevar.
