= Vritta =

Indian Kannada-language mystery thriller film

- Theatrical release poster
- Directed by: Likith Kumar
- Written by: Likith Kumar
- Produced by: T. Shivakumar
- Starring: Maahir Mohiuddin; Harini; Chaithra J Achar
- Cinematography: Gowtham Krishna
- Edited by: Suresh Arumugam
- Music by: Antony MG
- Production company: Lakshay Arts
- Distributed by: Jayanna Films
- Release date: 1 August 2025
- Country: India
- Language: Kannada

Vritta is a 2025 Indian Kannada-language mystery thriller film written and directed by Likith Kumar. The film stars Maahir Mohiuddin, Harini Sundararajan and Chaithra J Achar in the lead roles. It is produced by T. Shivakumar under the banner of Lakshay Arts.

== Plot ==
The story around Mahir Muhiyuddin a man who is imploding and always on the move.

== Cast ==
- Maahir Mohiuddin as Siddharth
- Harini Sundararajan
- Chaithra J Achar as Susmita
- Master Anuraag
- Srinivas Prabhu

== Production ==
The film is written and directed by Likith Kumar, while the technical team consists of Gowtham Krishna as the cinematographer, Suresh Arumugam as the editor, and Antony MG as the music director.

== Reception ==
Susmita Sameera of Times of india stated that "A gripping experience for fans of psychological mystery thrillers and slow-burn dramas with emotional depth." Cinema Express critic wrote "Vritta offers a rare kind of survival thriller, one with no map, no end, and no escape."
