= Money Back Policy =

- Directed by: Jayaraj Vijay
- Written by: Manoj Ramsingh
- Produced by: Manoj Ramsingh
- Starring: Sreenivasan; Nedumudi Venu; Aishwarya Nambiar; Sarayu Mohan; Sreejith Vijay
- Cinematography: Murali Raman
- Edited by: K. Sreenivas
- Music by: M. Jayachandran
- Production company: Marvelous Entertainments
- Distributed by: Movie 2 Screen International
- Release date: 21 June 2013
- Country: India
- Language: Malayalam

Money Back Policy is a 2013 Indian Malayalam-language comedy film directed by Jayaraj Vijay, written and produced by Manoj Ramsingh. Starring, Sreenivasan and Nedumudi Venu. Aishwarya Nambiar, Sarayu Mohan, Sreejith Vijay, Jayan Cherthala and Indrans play other main roles.

== Plot ==
The film tells the story of Ashokan, a security guard in a luxury hotel. Although his surroundings and friends grow, he has a zero growth. He is envious of rich people but he trains his wife and children to lead a simple life in order to hide his jealous nature. Fortune favours him when he learns that he has inherited a huge sum from his ancestors. He gives up his job to live a lavish life and to make more money. Life changes for Ashokan when he meets Rupa, an insurance company advisor.

== Cast ==
- Sreenivasan as Ashokan V. K.
- Nedumudi Venu as C. P. Onachan
- Aishwarya Nambiar as Rupa
- Sarayu Mohan as Urmila, Ashokan's wife
- Bhagath Manuel as Prem, Chief Executive of Hamnet Builders & Developers
- Sreejith Vijay as Kiran
- Jayan Cherthala as Adv. Chandrakanth, Legal Advisor of Hamnet Builders & Developers
- Achuth Mohandas as a Leading Nameless Character Found On Ashokan's Travel By Bus
- Lakshmi Sanal as Hostel Warden
- Indrans
- Shritha Sivadas as Girl in bus (cameo appearance)
