= Swarnam =

- Directed by: Venugopan
- Written by: S. Suresh Babu
- Produced by: Soman Pallat
- Starring: Kalabhavan Mani; Praveena
- Narrated by: Mohanlal
- Cinematography: Saloo George
- Edited by: P. C. Mohanan
- Music by: Mohan Sithara
- Release date: 4 May 2008
- Country: India
- Language: Malayalam

Swarnam is a 2008 Malayalam language Indian drama film, directed by Venugopan and written by S. Suresh Babu. It stars Kalabhavan Mani and Praveena in lead roles and also features Jagathy Sreekumar, Indrans, Valsala Menon, Ashokan, Murali and Kozhikode Narayanan Nair in supporting roles. It was released in May 2008. The film was a box office failure.

== Cast ==
- Kalabhavan Mani as Dhivakaran
- Praveena as Radha
- Murali as Raghavan
- Baby Nayanthara
- Jagathy Sreekumar as Kunjambu
- Indrans as Bhairavan
- Valsala Menon
- Ashokan
- Kozhikode Narayanan Nair
- Shreyas Madhavan
