= My Lord (film) =

2026 Tamil film by Raju Murugan

- Theatrical release poster
- Directed by: Raju Murugan
- Written by: Raju Murugan
- Produced by: Jayanthi Ambethkumar
- Starring: M. Sasikumar; Chaithra J Achar; Asha Sharath; Guru Somasundaram
- Cinematography: Nirav Shah
- Edited by: Sathyaraj Natarajan
- Music by: Sean Roldan
- Production company: Olympia Films
- Distributed by: 2D Entertainment
- Release date: 13 February 2026
- Running time: 149 minutes
- Country: India
- Language: Tamil

My Lord is a 2026 Indian Tamil-language political satire film written and directed by Raju Murugan. The film stars M. Sasikumar and Chaithra J Achar, with Asha Sharath, Guru Somasundaram, Jayaprakash and Vasumithra in important roles. It follows the bureaucratic struggles that a humble couple faces after falsely being declared legally dead by corrupt officials.

My Lord was produced by Jayanthi Ambethkumar under Olympia Films banner. The film was released in theatres on 13 February 2026.

== Plot ==
Muthusirpi, a humble daily-wage worker in Kovilpatti, lives with his devoted wife Suseela. Despite their financial struggles, the couple shares a close bond and aspires to build a stable life. Their world collapses when a corrupt local moneylender, Shanmugam, targets them over a small unpaid loan. Using his influence over village administrative officer (VAO) Dhanapal and other officials, Shanmugam orchestrates a fraudulent scheme that falsely records Muthusirpi and Suseela as deceased in government records.

With their identities erased, the couple is effectively "dead" in the eyes of the law. They are denied access to ration supplies, healthcare, and employment benefits. Their appeals to local authorities are dismissed, with officials demanding bribes or redirecting them endlessly. Advocate Karthik, a young and idealistic lawyer, takes up their case after witnessing their plight, filing petitions to reinstate their legal identity.

Parallel to this, in Chennai, Union Health Minister Sujatha Mohan is battling end-stage renal failure and urgently requires a kidney transplant. Her politically powerful associates, including her aide Raghavan, covertly engage in illegal organ procurement networks. Through manipulated hospital databases, Muthusirpi—legally declared dead—is identified as a “perfect donor match.” This exposes a larger racket where marginalized individuals are declared dead on paper to facilitate organ harvesting for wealthy and influential patients.

Dr. Priya, a conscientious surgeon involved in Sujatha's treatment, begins to suspect irregularities in the donor documentation. Her investigation reveals discrepancies in death certificates and consent forms, leading her to question the legitimacy of the transplant process. Meanwhile, Muthusirpi is abducted by agents working for the organ trafficking network and taken to Chennai under the pretense of administrative verification.

Suseela, left alone, intensifies her efforts with Advocate Karthik, who escalates the case to the High Court. Media attention begins to build after a journalist, Arvind, publishes an exposé on “ghost citizens”—people declared dead due to bureaucratic fraud. The report links several such cases to illegal organ trade operations.

In the climax, Dr. Priya halts the transplant procedure moments before surgery after confirming that Muthusirpi is alive and has not given consent. This leads to a dramatic confrontation at the hospital, where Karthik, Suseela, and the police intervene. Evidence gathered by Arvind and Priya exposes the nexus between Shanmugam, VAO Dhanapal, Raghavan, and other officials involved in falsifying records and trafficking organs.

Sujatha Mohan, initially portrayed as unaware, is forced to confront the truth about the illegal means arranged for her survival. In a turning point, she publicly disowns the racket and orders an official investigation, though her moral accountability remains ambiguous.

The court ultimately rules in favor of Muthusirpi and Suseela, restoring their legal identities and ordering strict action against those responsible. Several officials and intermediaries are arrested, including Shanmugam and Dhanapal, while Raghavan attempts to flee but is apprehended.

The film ends on a bittersweet note. Although justice is partially served, Muthusirpi and Suseela's suffering underscores the vulnerability of the poor within corrupt systems. The closing scenes show them reclaiming their lives, while a voiceover emphasizes the need for systemic reform to prevent such exploitation of the powerless.

== Cast ==
- M. Sasikumar as Muthusirpi
- Chaithra J Achar as Suseela
- Asha Sharath as Central Minister Sujatha Mohan
- Guru Somasundaram as Kathirvelan
- Jayaprakash as Judge Ramanujam
- Mahadev Payakkal as Chief Doctor
- Gopi Nainar
- Vasumithra as the local money lender
- VJ Kemy as Gayathri "Gayu"
- Vivek R Venkatram as Sujatha Mohan's son-in-law
- Ramkumar Prasanna

== Production ==
On 26 January 2025, director Raju Murugan was announced to collaborate with M. Sasikumar for his next project titled My Lord. The announcement was made through a first-look poster featuring Sasikumar alongside Kannada actress Chaithra J Achar in the lead role, intended to mark her Tamil debut. It was produced by Jayanthi Ambethkumar under Olympia Films. The film was in post-production stage during the announcement in late-January 2025, after completing a 60-day long filming that took place in Kovilpatti and Chennai. Sasikumar began dubbing for his portions on 2 February 2025. Although My Lord was announced to mark Chaithra's debut in Tamil, 3BHK released before in 2025, marking My Lord her sophomore Tamil release.

== Music ==
My Lord

Soundtrack album by Sean Roldan
- Genre: Feature film soundtrack
- Language: Tamil
- Label: Think Music
- Producer: Sean Roldan

Sean Roldan chronology
With Love (2026)	My Lord (2026)	29 (2026)

Singles from My Lord
- 1. "Esa Kaaththa" Released: 19 November 2025; 2. "Raasathi Raasa" Released: 11 December 2025

The music was composed by Sean Roldan. The first single "Esa Kaaththa" was released on 19 November 2025. The second single "Raasathi Raasa" was released on 11 December 2025. The complete album was released on 10 February 2026.

Track listing
No.	Title	Lyrics	Singer(s)	Length
1.	"Raasathi Raasa"	Yugabharathi	V. M. Mahalingam, Muthu Sirpi	3:45
2.	"Esa Kaaththa"	Yugabharathi	Chinmayi Sripada, Sathyaprakash	3:57
3.	"Vandi Yeralam"	Raju Murugan, Athipatti K Mariyappan	Sean Roldan, Athipatti K Mariyappan	3:24
4.	"Pathu Kadal"	Raju Murugan	Sean Roldan, Srilakshmi Belamannu	3:13
5.	"Anbenum Peroli"	Yugabharathi	Meenakshi Elayaraja	2:54

== Release ==
My Lord was released in theatres on 13 February 2026. It was distributed by 2D Entertainment in Tamil Nadu.

== Reception ==
Abhinav Subramanian of The Times of India gave 3 out of 5 stars and wrote "My Lord lands enough of its jabs and keeps you curious. It just needed people as interesting as the mess they're stuck in." Avinash Ramachandran of Cinema Express gave 3 out of 5 stars and wrote "Despite the heavy themes of trafficking, donor list manipulation, and corruption flowing through every vein of our society, Raju Murugan treats the film with levity that reminds us of his very own Joker." Anusha Sundar of OTTPlay gave 2.5 out of 5 stars and wrote "My Lord settles in an oddly confusing position while trying to be both a social commentary and a cinematic campaign to instil kindness among humans.[...] An earnest storytelling that needed more emotional (read: not sympathetic) depth." Vishal Menon of The Hollywood Reporter India wrote that while the film began promisingly, it "ends with a loud message delivered without any cinematic subtlety", degenerating from a "biting satire to a generic drama".
