= Praveena =

Indian actress, dubbing artist

Praveena Nair
- Occupations: Actor; dubbing artist
- Years active: 1992–present
- Spouse: Pramod Nair

Praveena is an Indian actress and dubbing artist who predominantly appears in Malayalam television series and films in addition to a few Tamil television series and films. She is known for portraying mother roles in films and television operas.

She started her acting career through 1992 film Gowri. She has received several accolades including Kerala State Film Award for Second Best Actress for her performances in the films Agnisakshi in 1998 and Oru Pennum Randaanum in 2008. She received the Kerala State Film Award for Best Dubbing Artist for the films Elektra in 2010 and Ivan Megharoopan in 2012.

== Personal life ==
Praveena was born to N. Ramachandran Pillai and P. N. Lalithabai. Her father is a retired college professor. She has an elder brother, Pramod Ramachandran, who works as a software engineer in the United States. She was married to Pramod Nair who is a businessperson in Kerala. Following her marriage, she took a short hiatus from acting. The couple have a daughter named Gowri pramod .

== Career ==
She appeared in multiple films, including Agnisakshi, English Medium, Vasanthiyum Lakshmiyum Pinne Njaanum, Swarnam and Oru Pennum Randaanum. She later debuted in Malayalam cinema through Anil Babu's Kaliyoonjal in which she was paired opposite Dileep. In Oral Mathram The Truth and Ezhupunna Tharakan,

She has won Kerala State Film Award four times. In 1998, she won the Kerala State Film Award for Second Best Actress for her performance in Agnisakshi and in 2008 she won the same award for her role in Oru Pennum Randaanum. In 2010 and 2011, she won the Kerala State Film Award for Best Dubbing Artist for Elektra and Ivan Megharoopan respectively.

Her serials include Swapnam, Megham the recent Mounam, Malakhamar in Mazhavil Manorama and Mohakkadal. She has also been judge on several reality shows including Mummy & Me on Kairali TV, Comedy Stars and Star Singer on Asianet.

She has performed as a voice artist, for actresses like Jyothirmayi in Ente Veedu Appuvinteyum for Kavya Madhavan in Mizhi Randilum and Sadanandante Samayam and for Padmapriya in Amrutham.

== Filmography ==
=== Malayalam films ===
List of Praveena Malayalam film credits
Year	Film	Role	Notes
1992	Gauri	Young Gouri	Child artist
1997	Kaliyoonjal	Radha	
1997	Oral Mathram	Malavika Menon	
1998	Kalapam	Gopika	
1998	Pranayavarnangal	Vanaja	
1998	The Truth	Gayathri	
1998	Sreekrishnapurathe Nakshathrathilakkam	Asha	
1999	Onnaamvattam Kandappol	Sophia	
1999	Gaandhiyan	Divya	
1999	Agnisakshi	Thankam	
1999	Ezhupunna Tharakan	Rani	
1999	Mazhavillu	Neena	
1999	Rishivamsham	Drama artist	
1999	English Medium	Snehalatha	
1999	Saaphalyam	Ammu	
1999	Vasanthiyum Lakshmiyum Pinne Njaanum	Vasanthi	
2000	Pilots	Sr. Cindrella / Megha Mathew	
2000	Punaradhivasam	Savithri	
2000	Manassil Oru Manjuthulli	Maya	
2001	Nalacharitham Naalam Divasam	Indu	
2001	Swarnachirakumay	–	
2007	Rock n' Roll	Mariya	
2008	Swarnam	Radha	
2008	Thirakkatha	Meera	Cameo Appearance
2008	Oru Pennum Randaanum	Pankiyamma	
2009	Vilapangalkkappuram	Vilasini	
2010	Khilafath	–	
2010	Penpattanam	Adv. Maheshwari Iyer	
2010	Inganeyum Oral	Priyamvadha/Sheela Devi	
2011	Varadhanam		
2011	Super Hero		
2011	Beautiful	Doctor	
2012	Manjadikuru	Sheela	
2012	Mullamottum Munthiricharum	Sumitra	
2012	Akasmikam	Shailaja Teacher	
2012	Husbands in Goa	Annie	
2012	Ustad Hotel	Fareeda Razaq	
2013	Honey Bee	Lisamma	
2013	Memories	Parvathy	
2013	Weeping Boy	Nabeesu	
2013	Vedivazhipadu	Divine Character/Passenger	
2013	Ezhu Sundara Rathrikal	Dr. Daisy	
2013	Avicharitha	Charulatha	
2014	Law Point	Geetha	
2014	Bangalore Days	Shobha	
2014	Urava	–	
2014	Color Balloon	Seetha	
2014	Study Tour	Padmini Teacher	
2014	Little Superman	Jeny Wilson	Re-released in 2015
2015	Mili	Nancy	
2015	100 Days of Love	Adoor Pankajam	
2016	Kaattum Mazhayum	Deepa	
2016	Buddhanum Chaplinum Chirikkunnu	Indulekha	
2017	Honey Bee 2: Celebrations	Lissamma	Archive footage Uncredited cameo
2017	Vimaanam	Geetha	
2018	Carbon	Sujatha	Guest appearance
2018	Kadha Paranja Kadha	Rosakutty	
2018	Chalakkudykkaran Changathy	Herself	Uncredited photo only
2018	Savaari	Nirmala teacher	
2018	Mayil		
2019	Aakasha Ganga 2	Oppol	
2019	Happy Sardar	Annamma Inderpal Singh	
2021	Pidikittapulli	Revathy	
2021	Sumesh and Ramesh	Ushamol	
2022	Ente Mazha	Unni's aunt	
2022	Perfume	Sandra	
2023	Laika		
2026	Bouma		

Key
†	Denotes films that have not yet been released

=== Tamil films ===
List of Praveena Tamil film credits
Year	Film	Role
2016	Vetrivel	Rasamanickam's wife
2017	Theeran Adhigaram Ondru	Theeran's mother
2018	Saamy 2	Meenakshi
2019	Comali	Ravi's Mother
2021	Teddy	Lakshmi
2021	Laabam	Vanangamudi's wife
2023	Vaathi	Bala's mother
2023	Echo	
2023	Joe	Joe's mother

=== Telugu films ===
List of Praveena Telugu film credits
Year	Film	Role
2020	Bheeshma	Bheeshma's mother
2023	Sir	Bala's mother
2025	Game Changer	Ram's adoptive mother
2025	Daaku Maharaaj	Nandini's mother

=== As a dubbing artist ===
Year	Title	Voiced for	Language	Notes
1994	Jungle Book Shōnen Mowgli	Mowgli	Malayalam	Dubbed Version
1995	Moharavam	Manju Warrier	Malayalam	Serial
1997	Kilukil Pambaram	Kaveri	Malayalam	
1997	Itha Oru Snehagatha	Laila	Malayalam	
1997	Innalekalillaathe	Manju Warrier	Malayalam	
1997	Superman	Sreejaya Nair	Malayalam	
1997	Shobhanam	Meenakumari	Malayalam	
2003	Sthithi	Nandini Ghosal	Malayalam	
2003	Mizhi Randilum	Kavya Madhavan	Malayalam	
2003	Sadanandante Samayam	Kavya Madhavan	Malayalam	
2003	Ente Veedu Appuvinteyum	Jyothirmayi	Malayalam	
2004	Symphony	Anu Sasi	Malayalam	
2006	Amrutham	Padmapriya	Malayalam	
2006	Karutha Pakshikal	Meena	Malayalam	
2006	Vaasthavam	Kavya Madhavan	Malayalam	
2006	Photographer	Saranya Bhagyaraj	Malayalam	
2007	Naalu Pennungal	Padmapriya	Malayalam	
2008	Novel	Sada	Malayalam	
2008	Pakal Nakshatrangal	Lakshmi Gopalaswamy	Malayalam	
2008	Madambi	Mallika Kapoor	Malayalam	
2010	Oru Small Family	Seetha	Malayalam	
2010	Elektra	Manisha Koirala	Malayalam	
2012	Makaramanju	Mallika Kapoor	Malayalam	
2012	Ivan Megharoopan	Padmapriya	Malayalam	
2014	Homely Meals	Srinda	Malayalam	
2015	Njan Samvidhanam Cheyyum	Sreedhanya	Malayalam	
2016	Edavappathy	Manisha Koirala	Malayalam	
2018	Sakhavinte Priyasakhi	Neha Saxena	Malayalam	
2019	Unda	Easwari Rao	Malayalam	

== Television ==
List of Praveena television credits
Year	Show	Role	Language	Channel
1999	Ninavukal Novukal		Malayalam	DD Malayalam
2000	Illam		Malayalam	DD Malayalam
2002	Ganga	Ganga	Malayalam	DD Malayalam
2003	Swapnam	Janaki	Malayalam	Asianet
2004	Megham	Krishna	Malayalam	Asianet
2004–2005	Dambathya Geethangal	Amu	Malayalam	Asianet
2005	Swaram		Malayalam	Amrita TV
2006	Minnaram		Malayalam	Asianet
2006	Mounam		Malayalam	Surya TV
2007	Nandhanam		Malayalam	Surya TV
2007	Prayanam		Malayalam	Surya TV
2007	Swami Ayyappan	Dakshayani	Malayalam	Asianet
2008–2012	Devi Mahathmyam	Devi Mahamaya	Malayalam	Asianet
2008	Namma Kudumbam	Mahalakshmi	Tamil	Kalaignar TV
2009–2011	Maharani	Sandhya	Tamil	Star Vijay
2010–2011	Adi Parasakthi	Kamakshi Devi	Tamil	Star Vijay
2010	Mazhayariyathe	Achu	Malayalam	Surya TV
2011	Chila Nerangalil Chila Manushyar	Ganga	Malayalam	Amrita TV
2012	Sabarimala Sreedharmashastha	Devi	Malayalam	Asianet
2012	Sri Padmanabham	Thanka	Malayalam	Amrita TV
2012	Malakhamar	Sr.Agnez	Malayalam	Mazhavil Manorama
2012–2014	Mohakadal	Krishna	Malayalam	Surya TV
2013	Ullkkadal		Malayalam	Kairali TV
2014	Gauri		Malayalam	Doordarshan
2014	Vadhu	Hema	Malayalam	Surya TV
2015–2019	Priyamanaval	Umayal	Tamil	Sun TV
2017–2020	Kasthooriman	Sethulakshmi	Malayalam	Asianet
2019–2020	Magarasi	Shenbagam	Tamil	Sun TV
2020–2023	Raja Rani 2	Sivagami	Tamil	Star Vijay
2022–2024	Iniya	Gowri	Tamil	Sun TV
2025–2026	Getti Melam	Lakshmi	Tamil	Zee Tamil

Web series

List of Praveena television credits
Year	Show	Role	Language	Channel
2021	Parampara	Kamala	Telugu	Disney+ Hotstar
2022	Parampara Season 2	Kamala	Telugu	Disney+ Hotstar

=== Telefilms as an actress ===
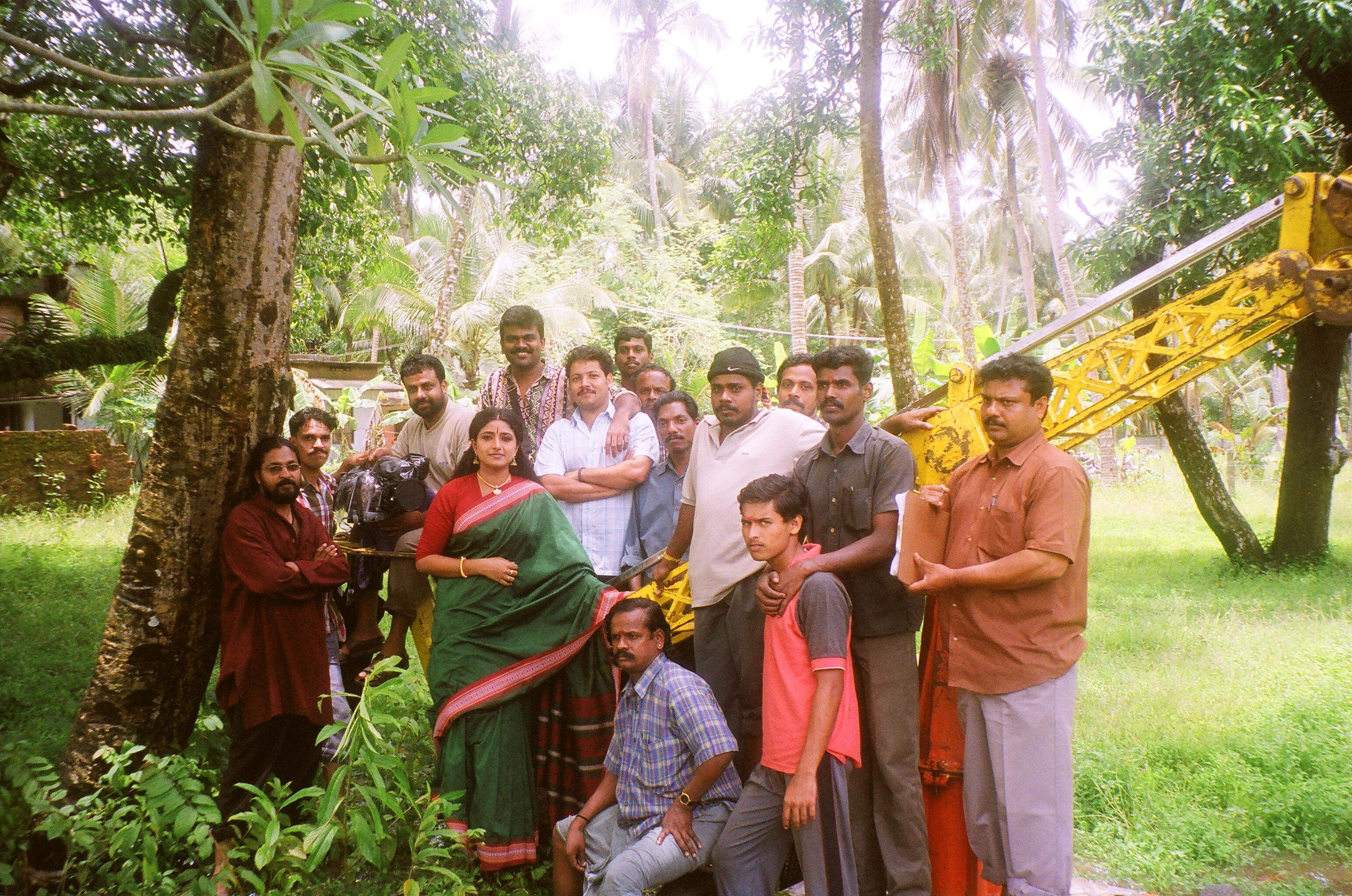
Kasthooriman on the sets of Neermaathalathinte Pookkal

- 2006 – Neermaathalathinte Pookkal (Amrita TV) as lead role
- 2007 – Annayude Lillipookkal (Surya TV) as Alice
- 2013 – Baby Sitter

=== Television programmes as an anchor ===
- Sapthaswarangal (Music Show, Doordarshan)
- Sangeethika (Music Show, Doordarshan)
- Maharani (Star Vijay)
- Snehasparsham (Asianet News)

=== Albums ===
- Sree Ramanam Devadevan
- Tamil
- Paaduka Saigal Paadu
- Iniyennum – Singer
- Amma – Singer

=== Reality shows as a judge ===
- Raree Rareram Raro (Asianet Plus)
- Mummy & Me (Kairali TV)
- Idea Star Singer (Asianet)
- Vodafone Comedy Stars (Asianet)
- Yuvatharam (Jaihind TV)
- Grihalakshmi (Jaihind TV)
- Super Dancer Junior (Amrita TV)
