= Pandavam =

- village
- Location in India, Kerala Pandavam (India)
- Coordinates: 9°39′49.43″N 76°30′40.41″E
- Country: India
- State: Kerala
- District: Kottayam

Government
  - Type: Panchayath
  - Body: Aymanam panchayath

Languages
  - Official: Malayalam, English
- Time zone: UTC+5:30 (IST)
- PIN: 686015
- Area code: 0481
- Vehicle registration: KL-05
- Nearest city: Kottayam
- Nearest airport: Cochin International Airport Limited

Pandavam (/-ˈpɑːndəvəm/) is a village in Aymanam panchayath in Kottayam District in the Indian state of Kerala. It is located near Kudayampady on Kottayam - Olassa - Parippu route.

== Etymology ==
The name Pandavam derived from "Pandavavanam", which literally means the forest of Pandavas.

== Legend ==
Legend has it that Pandavas had a sojourn there during one year of incognito. A popular belief is that Naranath Bhranthan installed a Shasta idol there. When Thekkumkur raja became old, he was unable to go to Sabarimala on the 'Makarsankranti' day. Shasta gave him a vision in his dream to acknowledge that he abodes in Pandavavanam to give darshan. Raja immediately cleared the forest and found an idol. Later, a shrine was constructed for Shasta there which is famed as Pandavam Sree Dharmasastha temple.

== Shasta temple ==
Pandavam Shasta Temple holds Shasta (Ayyappa) as the principal deity along with his consorts Purna and Pushkala. The tantric rights of the temple is held by "Kadiyakkol Mana". Lord Shiva, Malikapurathamma and Nagar are the sub-deities. The eight days annual festival is hosted in the Malayalam month of Dhanu which commences with the Aarattu ceremony. Travancore Devaswom Board administer the temple.

=== Temple Structure ===
The structure is adorned by several murals of various Hindu deities, sketched by Narayanapattar of Ramavarma Agrahara in Thiruvananthapuram. The southern temple wall has murals of Shivathandava, Ganapathi pooja and flute playing Krishna along with gopis. The western wall holds the murals of Ashvarooda (horse seated) Shasta, Yoga Narasimha and Subramanya. Indra (deity of east) performing Kalasabhisheka is pictured in the eastern wall. It is accompanied by the painting of a raja. Murals of elephant seated Shasta and Parvati parinaya (marriage of Parvati) are depicted in the northern wall. The Namaskara Mandapa in the complex is made of a single stone. The rafter and roof portions are made of granite

== Notable people ==
- Guinness Pakru, Malayalam film actor.
