= Kutteem Kolum =

2013 Indian film

- Directed by: Guinness Pakru
- Screenplay by: Suresh–Sathish
- Story by: Guinness Pakru
- Produced by: Ansar Vasco
- Starring: Guinness Pakru; Munna; Adithya Ayota; Sanusha
- Cinematography: A. Vinod Bharathi
- Music by: Shaan Rahman
- Production company: United Films
- Distributed by: Kalasangham Films
- Release date: 30 March 2013
- Country: India
- Language: Malayalam

Kutteem Kolum (transl. Kid and stick) is a 2013 Indian Malayalam-language comedy film directed by Guinness Pakru (in his directorial debut) and written by Suresh–Satheesh from a story by Pakru. It stars Pakru, Munna, Adithya Ayota, and Sanusha. The story revolves around the bonding between friends living in Kumarapuram village bordering Tamil Nadu.

Kutteem Kolum was released on 30 March 2013.

== Cast ==
- Guinness Pakru as Ezhimala Vinayakan
- Aditya as Sakthivel
- Sanusha as Indu
- Menaka as Subadra, Vinayakan's mother
- Vijayaraghavan as Madhava Menon, Indu's father
- Saiju Kurup as Sree Hari
- Suraj Venjaramoodu as Chandran
- Munna as Babu
- Siddique as Vinayakan's father
- Nirmal Palazhi as Abutty
- Devi Chandana
- Sreelaya
- Sona Nair as Kausalya, Indu's mother
- Babu Namboothiri as Kaimal
- Ponnamma Babu
- Sankar
- Bijukuttan
- Tini Tom as Advocate
- Nelson Sooranad as Sasi
- Abu Salim as Shah

== Production ==
The film marks the directorial debut of actor Guinness Pakru, who also star in the lead role.

== Soundtrack ==
Music was composed by Shaan Rahman and the lyrics were penned by Vayalar Sarath Chandra Varma and Vinayak. The audio was launched in late March 2013.

== Reception ==
Aswin J Kumar of The Times of India gave 2 out of 5 and wrote "Pakru has nothing new to offer in Kutiyum Kolum except that it is his debut directorial venture". Veeyen of nowrunning.com gave 1.5 out of 5 and wrote "Toying with an idea that has long been thrashed, Pakru does the unthinkable by deciding to craft it into a two-hour long film". The film was subsequently dubbed and released in Tamil as Sakthi Vinayagam after the lead characters.
