= Novel (film) =

2008 Indian film

- Directed by: East Coast Vijayan
- Produced by: East Coast Vijayan
- Starring: Jayaram; Sadha; Jagathy Sreekumar
- Cinematography: Alagappan N.
- Edited by: Vijay Shanker
- Music by: M. Jayachandran, Balabhaskar
- Distributed by: Kalasangham Films
- Release date: 25 January 2008
- Country: India
- Language: Malayalam

Novel is a 2008 Indian Malayalam-language romantic drama film produced and directed by East Coast Vijayan in his directorial debut. The film stars Jayaram and Sadha in the lead role. The film marks the debut of Sadha in Malayalam cinema.

== Plot ==
Sethunath (Jayaram) is a prosperous business man and also a writer. However, when his creation titled 'Swantham' becomes a best seller and bags the commonwealth awards. The writer is the least interested so much so that he is not even aware who translated his work & earned the award for the book.

Aneesa, a journalist, is determined to get a personal interview with her favorite writer Sethu and does not hesitate to get it at the expense of bribing Sethu's secretary Subramaniam Swamy and finally succeeds. Luckily for her, Sethu is impressed with her resilience and also the fact that she comes from the same orphanage that he hailed from makes him open his heart. He talks about his failed marriage and Priyanandini (Sadha) whom he encounters during the making of a lottery commercial. Gradually, Priya reaches the pinnacle of stardom with the support of Sethu.

In this process, both of them fall in love with each other and decide to get married. Manju (Shari), Sethu's wife from the US does not allow this. What does Manju do forms the rest of the story.

== Cast ==
- Jayaram as Sethunath
- Sadha as Priyanandini (Voice by Praveena)
- Sharika Menon as Manju
- Jagathy Sreekumar
- Nedumudi Venu
- Sarika
- Saiju Kurup as Lekshmanan
- Bindu Panicker
- Indrans
- Devan
- Baby Nayanthara as Thara
- M. Jayachandran as himself in a telephone call (cameo)

== Soundtrack ==
- "Onninumallathe (Duet)" - K. J. Yesudas, Manjari
- "Poonkuyile Poonkuyile" - Shweta Mohan
- "Enninakkiliyude" - K. J. Yesudas
- "Urangan Neeyenikku (Male)" - K. J. Yesudas
- "Ithramelenne Nee" - K. J. Yesudas, Sujatha Mohan
- "Onninumallathe (Female)" - Manjari
- "Urangan Neeyenikku (Female)" - Manjari
- "Onninumallathe (Male)" - K. J. Yesudas
- "Arikilillenkilum" - K. J. Yesudas

== Reception ==
A critic from Sify wrote that "This Novel has to be flipped through, otherwise it will take ages to read it, as it moves at snail pace".
