= Kamaraddin =

Indian actor

Kamaruddheen was the tallest known man in Kerala who stood at 7 ft 2 in (2.184 m). He was a native of Guruvayoor, Kerala and was a senior member of the Kerala Tall Men Association. He has also acted in films, most notably as one of the cannibalistic giants in the Vinayan film Athbhutha Dweepu. He died in 2024, aged 57.

== Filmography ==
- Athbhutha Dweepu (2005)
