= Gilky =

Indian Kannada-language romantic drama film

- Theatrical release poster
- Directed by: YK
- Produced by: Narasimha Kulkarni
- Starring: Tarak Ponappa; Chaithra J Achar; Goutham Raj
- Cinematography: Karthik S
- Edited by: Kemparaju B S
- Music by: Songs: Adil Nadaf; Score: Aparajith Sris
- Production company: A S Kamadhenu Films
- Release date: 17 February 2022
- Country: India
- Language: Kannada

Gilky is a 2022 Indian Kannada-language romantic drama film directed by YK and starring Tarak Ponappa, Chaithra J Achar and Goutham Raj.

== Plot ==
Inspired by the Korean film Oasis (2002), the film follows three people with disabilities — a mentally ill Gilky, Nancy with cerebral palsy and a visually impaired Shakespeare – and how they create their own world.

== Cast ==
- Tarak Ponnappa as Shakti "Gilky"
- Chaithra J Achar as Nancy
- Goutham Raj as Shakespeare
- Ashwin Hasan
- Sunil Kumar Y K

== Production ==
The director YK was inspired by characters from Puttanna Kanagal's films in addition to Upendra's films. The inspiration for Chaithra J Achar's character Nancy came from when YK met a physically disabled girl whose only interaction with the outside world was when she was offered food. The film was shot for 22 days in Mangaluru.

== Reception ==
Sunayana Suresh of The Times of India rated the film 3/5 and wrote, "Gilky is a brave attempt and the makers have tried something that many would not attempt to do. But what acts as a possible setback are some of the scenes that end up being wrong while trying to ensure ample drama". A. Sharadhaa of Cinema Express gave the film the same rating and wrote, "YK's experiment with an unusual subject is laudable, but somehow he fails to generate an impact". A critic from Deccan Herald gave the film the same rating and wrote, "'Gilky' is an important movie that stays brutally honest and true to life, pushing those who are touched by the movie to think about it". Prathibha Joy of OTTplay rated the film 3.5/5 stars and wrote, "YK’s directorial debut is a commendable effort of highlighting the world of a couple with intellectual and physical challenges".
