= Toby (film) =

- Theatrical release date poster
- Directed by: Basil Alchalakkal
- Screenplay by: Raj B. Shetty
- Story by: T. K. Dayanand
- Produced by: Ravi Rai Kalasa
- Starring: Raj B. Shetty; Samyukta Hornad; Chaithra J Achar; Raj Deepak Shetty
- Cinematography: Praveen Shriyan
- Edited by: Nithin Shetty
- Music by: Midhun Mukundan
- Production companies: Lighter Buddha Films; Coffee Gang Studios; Agastya Films; Smooth Sailers studio
- Distributed by: KVN Productions
- Release date: 25 August 2023
- Country: India
- Language: Kannada
- Budget: 5cr
- Box office: 6cr

Toby is a 2023 Indian Kannada-language action drama film directed by Basil Alchalakkal and produced by Ravi Rai Kalasa. The film stars Raj B. Shetty in the title role, alongside Samyukta Hornad, Chaithra J Achar and Raj Deepak Shetty. The music was composed by Midhun Mukundan, while the cinematography was handled by Praveen Shriyan and editing by Nithin Shetty.

The titular character is based on a 8 page short story by T.K. Dayanand, Raj. B. Shetty retained the attributes of the character from the story and wrote a new script for the film. The film is based in Kumta region of Uttara Kannada district in Kanara.

Toby was released on 25 August 2023 and received positive reviews from critics. The film was dubbed and released in Malayalam by Wayfarer Films on 22 September 2023. Movie earned 4.3Cr from world wide at the end of its theatrical run and became moderate success in boxoffice.

== Plot ==
Sampath is a newly appointed SI who joins duty at Tamas Katte police station. At this juncture, Jenny visits the police station and creates a ruckus over the cops inability to trace her missing foster father Toby. Sampath asks Kushalappa about Jenny and decides to investigate the case. Kushalappa takes Sampath to many people, including Fr. Iglesias who narrates that Toby had lost his voice in an incident and had met him in a remand home. Iglesias tells that he had helped Toby get released from the remand home and tried to get him a job at the church, but Toby had become a headache for him.

Sampath also meets a sex worker named Savithri who reveals about her love life with Toby and the circumstances which forced her to marry someone else. Sampath also meets Damodar, a mortuary worker who tells him about his friendship with Toby, and also learns from Toby's neighbour Shalini that Toby was often used as an assassin by the village chief Anand and that Anand impregnated Jenny in order for Toby to get released from prison as Toby was arrested for Anand's crimes. Toby assumed that Prashantha impregnated Jenny and tried to kill him after Anand told him to do so as Prashantha informed Anand's smuggling activities to the police, but Jenny stopped him and revealed the truth. Toby decided to mend his ways where he tracks down Prashantha and apologize to him.

After Sampath leaves, Shalini meets Toby and Prashantha and reveals that Jenny has been searching all the time. However, Ananda and his men attack Toby and Prashantha after learning of their arrival, where they are admitted to the hospital. Shalini learns from the doctor that Jenny had taken a surgical knife in order to kill Ananda, but Ananda killed her and stuffed her body into a meat grinder. An awaken Toby learns about this and finds Ananda at the fair. A battle ensues between Ananda and Toby, where Toby decapitates Ananda, thus avenging Jenny's death. Toby is later shot by Sampath and dies from his injuries.

== Cast ==
- Raj B. Shetty as Toby
- Samyukta Hornad as Savithri
- Chaithra J Achar as Jenny
- Raj Deepak Shetty as Ananda
- Gopalkrishna Deshpande as Damodhara
- Sandhya Arakere as Shalini
- Bharath GB as Sampath
- Yathish Baikampady as Kushalappa
- Yogi Bankeshwar as Priest

== Soundtrack ==
Midhun Mukundan composed the soundtrack and background score.

== Release ==
Toby was released on 25 August 2023. The film was dubbed and released in Malayalam by Wayfarer Films on 22 September 2023.

== Reception ==
Toby received positive reviews from critics with praise for its acting, script, direction and technical aspects, but criticized its pace and ending.

=== Critical response ===
Prathibha Joy of OTTplay gave 4/5 stars and wrote "Toby may not be a film for everyone, but should you give it a chance, you may just like it after all." Sridevi S of The Times of India gave 3/5 atars and wrote "Toby is a good experience, but it will leave you craving for more."

Vivek M. V. of The Hindu wrote "The top-notch performances propel the film’s interesting characters, but ‘Toby’ is marred by lack of surprises and a generic ending." Shuklaji of The News Minute gave 3/5 stars and wrote "Raj B Shetty plunges headlong into his titular character of Toby, but he also becomes a bit of a control freak while doing so, telling us, the viewer, how to feel about every dramatic moment."

A. Sharaadha of Cinema Express gave 3.5/5 stars and wrote "Toby offers a satisfying cinematic experience, yet it leaves a lingering sense of yearning for something more." Y Maheswara Reddy of Bangalore Mirror gave 3/5 stars and wrote "The slow pace of narration may be a drawback, but it is a must-watch if you want to see talented actor Raj B Shetty in a different avatar."
