= Loudspeaker (2009 film) =

- Theatrical release poster
- Directed by: Jayaraj
- Screenplay by: Jayaraj
- Story by: Jayaraj; P. Y. Jose
- Produced by: Jayaraj; M.P. Surendranth (co-producer)
- Starring: Mammootty; Sasi Kumar; Gracy Singh; Jagathy Sreekumar; Cochin Hanifa; Saleem Kumar; KPAC Lalitha
- Cinematography: Gunashekhar
- Edited by: Vijai Sankar
- Music by: Bijibal
- Production company: New Generation Cinema
- Distributed by: P. A. Sebastine; Time Ads Entertainment
- Release date: 20 September 2009 (Kerala)
- Running time: 127 minutes
- Country: India
- Language: Malayalam

Loudspeaker is a 2009 Indian Malayalam-language tragicomedy drama film produced, written, and directed by Jayaraj, starring Mammootty, Sasi Kumar, Gracy Singh, Jagathy Sreekumar, Cochin Hanifa, Saleem Kumar, and KPAC Lalitha.

== Plot ==
Anand Menon returns to India from USA to get a kidney transplant and Mike phillipose a villager who is trying to sell his kidney to make some money. The movie revolves around the developing friendship between Anand and Mike and how Mike transform the sterile surroundings with his easygoing nature.

== Cast ==
- Mammootty as Mike Phillipose
- Sasi Kumar as Anand Menon
- Gracy Singh as Annie (voiceover by Vimmy Mariam George)
- Anoop Menon as Dr. Ollurkkaran
- Jagathy Sreekumar as Secretary Geevarghese
- Salim Kumar as KP
- Cochin Haneefa as Organ agent Sarangadharan
- Guinness Pakru as Organ agent Amitabh
- Suraj Venjaramood as Counselor Eswarapillai Kumarapillai
- Harisree Ashokan as Kathanar
- KPAC Lalitha as Kunjannama
- Nayanthara Chakravarthy as Angela
- Janardhanan as Old man
- Nayanthara Chakravarthy as Angela
- Babu Swami as Ouseph, Kunjannama's husband
- Bheeman Raghu as Madhavan Nair
- Kalpana as Rugmini
- Augustine as Watchman Mohan Das
- Kalamandalam Gopi as Valliya Ammavan
- Unnikrishnan Namboothiri as Menon's relative
- Rugmini Warassyar as Menon's relative
- Valsala Menon as Annie's mother
- Sukumari as Head Nurse
- Kundara Johny as loanshark
- Ambika Mohan as Menon's relative
- Subair Alappuzha as Dr. Philson
- Abu Salim
- Sreejith Ravi as bachelor
- Romeo as bachelor
- Suraj Devaraj as bachelor
- Indulekha Warrier as Soudamini

== Soundtrack ==
The songs of Loudspeaker were composed by Bijibal and the lyrics were written by Anil Panachooran. "Alliyambal", a famous song from Rosy composed by Job Master and sung by K. J. Yesudas, is adopted in this film. The new version of the song is sung by his son, Vijay Yesudas.

- "Changazhi Muthumayi" - sung by Mammootty
- "Kattarinu Thorathoru"- Singer: P. Jayachandran. Lyrics: Anil Panachooran
- "Manjinte Mamala"
- "Alliyambal" - sung by Vijay Yesudas
- "Kattarinu Thorathoru - Anjali Muraleedharan (female)"
- "Changazhi Muthumayi (male)"
