= Changayi =

Malayalam film

- Directed by: Sudhesh Kumar
- Written by: Muhammed Shafeeq
- Produced by: Sudhesh Kumar
- Starring: Amal Shah; Govind V Pai; Bhagath Manuel; Jaffar Idukki
- Music by: Mohan Sithara
- Production company: Avya Films
- Release date: 12 January 2021
- Running time: 122 minutes
- Country: India
- Language: Malayalam

Changayi (English: Friend) is a 2021 Malayalam drama film directed by Sudhesh Kumar starring Amal Shah and Bhagath Manuel.

== Synopsis ==
The movie talks about the friendship between Plus 2 students, Irfan and Manu, who belong to two different religions.

== Cast ==
- Amal Shah
- Govind V Pai
- Bhagath Manuel
- Jaffar Idukki
