= Perinoru Makan =

- Promotional poster
- Directed by: Vinu Anand
- Starring: Bhagath Manuel; Saranya Mohan; Innocent
- Music by: Berny–Ignatius
- Release date: 20 July 2012
- Country: India
- Language: Malayalam

Perinoru Makan (transl. A son with the name...) is a 2012 Indian Malayalam-language romantic family drama film directed by Vinu Anand and starring Bhagath Manuel, Saranya Mohan, and Innocent. The film received negative reviews from critics and was a box office failure. It marks Saranya Mohan's last Malayalam film till date.

== Cast ==
- Bhagath Manuel as Satheesan
- Saranya Mohan as Bhama
- Innocent as Harishchandran
- Guinness Pakru
- Suraj Venjaramoodu
- Tini Tom
- Souparnika Subhash as Bindhu
- KPAC Lalitha
- Niyaz
- Sudheesh
- Vanitha Krishnachandran

== Reception ==
A critic from Rediff.com rated the film two out of five stars and wrote that "Perinoru Makan is neither good nor bad; it's just indifferent". A critic from The Times of India rated the film one out of five stars and wrote that "The narrative is so over-crowded with filial affection, family feud, scheming relatives that the director finds it a bit too hard to put everything in place".
