= Chaithra J Achar =

Indian actress and singer

- Born: Bangalore, Karnataka, India
- Occupations: Actress; Singer
- Years active: 2019–present

Chaithra J Achar is an Indian actress and singer, who works in Kannada films, in addition few Tamil films. She made her acting debut in the film Mahira (2019).

== Early life and education ==
Chaithra Achar was born in Bangalore, Karnataka. She went to Ramaiah Institute of Technology in Bangalore to study engineering and also worked as an intern at JNCASR.

== Career ==
=== Acting ===
Chaithra, while still in college, began her professional acting career with Bengaluru Queens, a Kannada Web Series directed and produced by actor Anish Tejeshwar. She made her Kannada feature film debut in 2019, with the action thriller Mahira, directed by Mahesh Gowda. Chaithra had roles in films such as Aa Drushya, Taledanda, and Gilky.

In 2023, she had two releases namely Toby with Raj B. Shetty and Sapta Sagaradaache Ello Side-B alongside Rakshit Shetty and Rukmini Vasanth under Hemanth Rao. Her performance in both the movies were well received and widely appreciated by audience and critics. Her next release was Blink directed by debutant Srinidhi Bengaluru, the film opened to critical acclaim with appreciation for all the actors.

=== Singing ===
Chaithra's noted song is "Sojugaada Sooju Mallige", a Kannada folk song used by musician Midhun Mukundan in Garuda Gamana Vrishabha Vahana, a successful film of 2021.

== Filmography ==
Key
†	Denotes films that have not yet been released

List of films and roles
Year	Title	Role(s)	Language(s)	Notes	Ref.
2019	Mahira	Adya	Kannada	Debut film	
2019	Aa Drushya	Asha	Kannada		
2022	Gilky	Nancy	Kannada		
2022	Taledanda	Saaki	Kannada		
2023	Toby	Jenny	Kannada		
2023	Sapta Saagaradaache Ello: Side B	Surabhi	Kannada		
2024	Blink	Devaki	Kannada		
2024	Happy Birthday To Me	Adithi	Kannada		
2025	3BHK	Aishwarya "Aishu"	Tamil	Tamil debut; credited as Chaithra	
2025	Eddelu Manjunatha 2		Kannada		
2025	Vritta	Susmita	Kannada		
2025	Yarigu Helbedi	Dr.Steffie	Kannada		
2026	My Lord	Suseela Muthusirpi	Tamil		
2026	Maarnami	Deeksha	Kannada		
2026	Meesaya Murukku 2	Lakshmi	Tamil		
2026	418	Devika	Telugu	Telugu debut	
2027	Inji Vellam †	TBA	Tamil	Post-production	
TBA	Uttarakaanda †	TBA	Kannada	Filming	
TBA	Strawberry †	Namrutha	Kannada	Post-production	
TBA	Laila’s Sweet Dream †	Laila	Kannada	Filming	

== Discography ==
Year	Song title	Movie	Notes
2019	"Neelaakasha Kelu"	Sarvajanikarige Suvarnavakasha	
2020	"Neenyaaro"	Mayabazar 2016	
2021	"Sojugada Soojumallige"	Garuda Gamana Vrishabha Vahana	
2022	"Soul Of Benki"	Benki	
2023	"Nondkobyaadve"	Tagaru Palya	
2023	"Mellage"	Swathi Mutthina Male Haniye	Backing Vocals
2024	"Soul of Shakhahaari"	Shakhahaari	

== Awards and nominations ==
Year	Award	Category	Work	Result	Ref.
2021	South Indian International Movie Awards	Best Female Playback Singer – Kannada	"Sojugada Soojumallige"(from Garuda Gamana Vrishabha Vahana)	Won	
2022	South Indian International Movie Awards	Best Female Playback Singer – Kannada	"Soul of Benki" (from Benki)	Nominated	
2023	Filmfare Awards South	Best Actress – Kannada	Taledanda	Won	
2023	South Indian International Movie Awards	Best Actress – Kannada	Gilky	Nominated	
2024	South Indian International Movie Awards	Best Actress – Kannada	Toby	Won	
2025	South Indian International Movie Awards	Best Actress – Kannada	Blink	Nominated	
2025	Filmfare Awards South	Best Actress – Kannada	Blink	Nominated	
