= My Big Father =

2009 film

- VCD cover
- Directed by: Mahesh P. Sreenivasan
- Screenplay by: Satheesh K. Sivan, Suresh Menon
- Produced by: P.A. Sebastian
- Starring: Jayaram; Kanika; Guinness Pakru; Innocent; Jagathy Sreekumar; Suraj Venjaramoodu; Salim Kumar
- Cinematography: Vipin Mohan
- Edited by: Raja Mohammad
- Music by: Alex Paul
- Distributed by: Casino pictures
- Release date: December 2009
- Country: India
- Language: Malayalam

My Big Father is a 2009 Indian Malayalam-language film directed by Mahesh P. Sreenivasan. The film stars Guinness Pakru, Jayaram and Kanika. It was released in December 2009. The film was produced by P. A. Sebastian and was distributed by Casino pictures.

My Big Father is about a father and son, where the father is a dwarf. The role of the father is played by the two feet tall Guinness Pakru. Jayaram plays the role of the son. The film sets a big release over 110 screens in Kerala. The film was a box office success.

== Plot summary ==
Kunjumon lands up in Kochi with an infant in hand. He approaches a teashop owner Thomas Kutty, with a recommendation letter, who says there is no scope for him there as the shop is on the verge of closing down. By the time the credits end, the business has turned around and the infant has grown up. The infant grows up to be Alby. Kunjumon is now the owner of a successful catering firm, managed by his former manager Thomaskutty. The trio live together as friends.

Everything is hunky dory and things stay in a comedic vein; the inkling of conflict comes in the form of a vow taken by Alby that he will not marry a girl who laughs at his father. As luck would have it, Alby falls in love with Ancy, whom he spots in a shopping mall and they get married. But things do not move smoothly, leading Kunjumon to ostracization from his own family and to contemplating suicide. Kunjumon is taken to the hospital, the doctor says that his head is seriously injured, which will cause some changes in his afterlife such as he will not remember anyone, and he will behave like a child.

Kunjumon creates many havoc to Alby and Ancy such as spoiling their first night and hiding their baby boy in a bag. Due to this Ancy leaves him to her house with her baby. The next day Alby takes Kunjumon to a mental rehabilitation centre to cure him but when Alby leaves with Thomas Kutty, Kunjumon follows them and meets with a road accident where he regains his memory. One day, Ancy's father Colonel Varghese goes to the hospital and tells the doctor all the cruel things that Kunjumon has done to Alby and Ancy. Varghese forces the doctor to kill Kunjumon so that he won't create any problems for Alby and Ancy but the doctor refuses. Kunjumon who gains consciousness, hears all this including Kunjumon trying to kill his own grandson and becomes sad. The next day, Kunjumon goes missing. When Alby and Thomaskutty searches for him, the doctor reveals to Alby of Varghese's plan of killing Kunjumon. He angrily goes to Ancy's house and confronts her father. But he doesn't know where is Kunjumon and he did the option for Alby and Ancy. Along with Ancy, they goes to search Kunjumon but they couldn't find him. Alby goes to Biryani Mohammed's house whose right hand was Kunjumon. Alby was glad to hear the Kunjumon regained his memory. He begs Kunjumon to come back but Kunjumon refuses as he couldn't face their baby and the problems he did to them. Alby hands over their baby to Kunjumon and he kisses the baby and they all reunite.

After 7 years, their baby grows as a teenager and he plays football with Kunjumon. He kicks the ball and when Kunjumon catches it, he flies to the sky.

== Cast ==
- Jayaram as Alby
- Guinness Pakru as Kunjumon, Alby's father
- Kanika as Ancy
- Innocent as Thomaskutty
- Jagathy Sreekumar as Valanjambalam Vasu
- Suraj Venjarammood as Tony
- Salim Kumar as Unnikkuttan
- Kochu Preman as Preman
- Baburaj as Chacko
- Fathima Babu as Mary
- Devan as Colonel Varghese
- Majeed as Proposed lady's father
- Ambika Mohan as Proposed lady's mother
- Kozhikode Narayanan Nair as Head Master
- Narayanankutty as Marriage Broker
- Krishna Praba as Ancy's Friend
- Raghavan as Doctor
- T. G. Ravi as Biriyani Mohammed
- Kanakalatha as Khadeeja
- Gayathri as nurse

== Songs ==
The songs were written by Vayalar Sarath Chandra Varma and tuned by Alex Paul.

1. "Nira Thinkale": K. J. Yesudas
2. "Nira Thinkale": Manjari
3. "Appa Chattambi": Shyam Prasad
4. "Mohichille": M. G. Sreekumar, Rimi Tomi
