= Albhutha Dweep =

- Directed by: Vinayan
- Written by: Vinayan
- Dialogues by: Ashok-Shasi
- Produced by: P. A. Philippose; T. K. Appukuttan
- Starring: Prithviraj Sukumaran; Guinness Pakru
- Cinematography: Shaji Kumar
- Edited by: G. Murali
- Music by: M. Jayachandran
- Production company: Gulfline Productions
- Distributed by: Aroma Release
- Release date: 25 March 2005
- Running time: 150 minutes
- Country: India
- Language: Malayalam

Albhutha Dweep (transl. Wonder island) is a 2005 Indian Malayalam-language comedy fantasy survival film written and directed by Vinayan. The plot is set on an uncontacted island where men are dwarfs and women are of normal height, where four Indian Navy men gets stranded. The film stars Prithviraj Sukumaran and Guinness Pakru in the lead roles along with Mallika Kapoor, Jagathy Sreekumar, Jagadish, Indrans, Kalpana, Ponnamma Babu and Bindu Panicker in supporting roles.

Pakru (Ajayan), who played prince Gajendran, made an entry into the Guinness Book of Records for being the shortest actor (76 cm height) to play a full-length character in a film. The film was commercially successful at the box office. The film was also given an entry into the Guinness Book of Records for casting the most dwarves in a single film.

== Plot ==
There exists an island inhabited by dwarf men and typical women. Men of normal height are believed to be demons. The ruler of the island, King Valiyavamana Thirumanasu invites various princes to his capital city of Vamanapuri in order to compete for the hands of his five daughters. Four of his daughters are successfully engaged, but the youngest princess, Radha, has no wish to get married. Nonetheless, he decides to have her engaged to Prince Gajendran, his nephew and heir, who is deeply in love with Radha. In order to celebrate the engagements, Thirumanasu orders a week of celebration.

Meanwhile, Indian Navy officers, Gautham, Mohammed, Harindran "Hari", Madhavan, Joseph and Chandrappan wash up on the island. The first two are brutally killed by the island's inhabitants under the lead of Gajendran, who believes them to be demons, while the others take refuge in an old temple in the forest, fearing for their life.

It is at this time, the princesses proceed to the temple, along with their handmaiden Mallika, to pray to their god, Gandharvan. Arriving to the temple, the group comes across Devamma, mystic. Devamma narrated to them the story of Gandharvan. A thousand years ago, Gandharvan fell in love with the king's daughter. In fear of losing the princess, her suitor planned to kill the Gandharvan using black magic but the plan was thwarted whent the princess stole the magic and handed it over to Gandharvan, who in his anger, cursed all the men of the island to be dwarves. He also decreed that any man who steps inside his temple, would have his head exploded. In the end, to showcase his gratitude towards the princess, he promised to protect the land for a millennium. Devamma ends her narration, by cautioning the group that the said time has elapsed, making the island vulnerable to evil forces.

While exploring the temple, Radha comes across Hari and believes him to be Gandharvan on account of his height. Hari, fearing being exposed, begs Radha to not reveal their location. Radha agrees and provides them food later that day, when she is comes across Gajendran, who becomes suspicious on seeing her late at night at such a notorious place.In an attempt to protect her secret, Radha lies to Gajendran about the Gandharvan appearing to her in a dream and summoning her to the temple and promptly feigns illness. On consulting the Rajaguru, the Thirumanasu is instructed to host a puja in order to exorcise Gandharvan from Radha.

Radha reveals the truth to Mallika, who agrees to help her. The cook up a plan, according to which, the men disguises as dwarves and arrives before the Thirumanasu under the pretext of healing Radha, when they discover Madhavan and Thirumanasu to be look-alikes. After convincing Thirumanassu and Gajendran of their ability to cure Radha, Thirumanasu appoints the group as his royal priests, only to discover that, they are in fact, imposters. This revelation forces the group to take the Thirumanasu hostage.

With the Thirumanasu missing, Gajendran takes over the throne. He fears of a relationship between Hari and Radha, which drives him to order the saints for his coronation, so that he can marry Radha. During the coronation, Thirumanasu arrives to the scene, after being rescued by a daughter of his. He assumes Gajendran teamed up with fake priests to eliminate him but Gajendran clears the misunderstanind by stating how he just wanted to marry Radha. Back in power, Thirumanasu blows the cover of the group and reveals Radha's involvement. He then sentences the group to death.

Just as the death sentence is to be carried out, the island is attacked by giant cannibals, who overpower and kill the dwarves. With no other option, Thirumansu releases the group, who defeats the giants and saves the island kingdom. For this act, they are forgiven and allowed to return to their homeland with Radha but Hari refuses to take her, instead opting to leave the princess in her kingdom. Gajendran, however, stops them and tells how his world only had dwarves until now but now he realises how insignificant they are to god. With this, he hands over Radha to her Gandharvan, to Hari. The group then sets sail to the modern world.

== Cast ==
- Prithviraj Sukumaran as Harindran "Hari", Indian Navy officer
- Guinness Pakru as Gajendran, Prince of Vamanapuri
- Mallika Kapoor as Rajakumari Radha, Princess of Vamanapuri (voice-over by Sreeja Ravi)
- Jagathy Sreekumar in a dual role as:
  - Madhavan, Indian Navy officer
  - Maharajan Valiyavamana Thirumanassu (Madhulan), King of Vamanapuri
- Jagadish as Joseph, Indian Navy officer
- Indrans as Chandrappan, Indian Navy officer
- Kalpana as Mallika, chief maid of the court and Thirumanassu's love interest
- Ponnamma Babu as Maharani Arundhati, first wife of Thirumanassu
- Bindu Panicker as Maharani Anasuya, second wife of Thirumanassu
- Sajan Sagara as Ittunnan, Gajendran's friend
- Valsala Menon as Devamma, an extraordinary old lady
- Sonika as Rajkumari Lakshmi
- Renjusha Menon as Rajkumari Indumathi
- Vettoor Purushan as Rajaguru, a cunning sorcerer
- Mela Raghu as Village Chief of Vamanapuri
- Manuraj as Gautham, Indian Navy officer
- Baburaj as Mohammed, Indian Navy officer
- Balakrishnan as Vakraraja Odiyan
- Kamaraddin as a cannibalistic giant
- Thumboor Shibu as cannibalistic giant

Tamil version

- Manivannan as Maharaja
- Karunas as Karuppiah
- Vaiyapuri as Vaiyapuri
- Thavakalai Chittibabu as Dwarf
- Malavika as Kanaka (special appearance in the song "Chinna Machan")

== Soundtrack ==
The soundtrack was composed by M. Jayachandran and the lyrics were written by Kaithapram Damodaran Namboothiri and Vinayan.

- Oridathorida - Vidhu Prathap, Jyotsna
- Chakkaramavinte - Alex Kayyalaykkal, Jyotsna
- Shyama Mohini - Madhu Balakrishnan, K. S. Chithra
- Hey Raja - Alex, Sudeep Kumar, Sujatha

Tamil version

Lyrics were written by Palani Bharathi and Pa. Vijay.

- Oridathil - Tippu, Binny Krishnakumar
- Saama Mohini - Madhu Balakrishnan, Sujatha
- Oh Raja - Alex, Nishad
- Sakkarakatti - Alex
- Chinna Machan - Pushpavanam Kuppusamy, Rimi Tommy

== Release and reception ==
The film was a 2005 commercial box-office success. A critic from Sify wrote, "nevertheless go and have fun watching Albhuthadweep which will appeal to viewers of all ages". The film was dubbed in Tamil as Arputha Theevu and included additional scenes reshot with Manivannan and Karunas. The Tamil version was released in 2007. Manivannan played Jagathi's part of dwarf king in Tamil. Malini Mannath of Chennai Online wrote that "With its colourful characters and happenings, the film is an enjoyable entertainer, and is an ideal summer treat for children".

Vinayan said that American director Ron Howard has showed interest in remaking the film in English, and they have contacted him for a discussion. The further developments is unknown.
