= Mulavana =

Mulavana(irunilamukku)
- village
- Location in Kerala, India Mulavana(irunilamukku) (India)
- Coordinates: 8.993558°N 76.676459°E
- Country: India
- State: Kerala
- District: Kollam
- Elevation: 40 m (130 ft)

Population (2011)
  - Total: 35,887

Languages
  - Official: Malayalam, English
- Time zone: UTC+5:30 (IST)
- PIN: 691 503
- Telephone code: 474
- Vehicle registration: KL-02
- Nearest city: Kollam City (15 km)
- Lok Sabha constituency: Kollam
- Vidhan Sabha constituency: Kundara
- Climate: Tropical monsoon (Köppen)

Mulavana is a village in Kollam district in the state of Kerala, India. The place is filled with almost all types of shops, which includes stationary, fancy, textile etc. The Mulavana fish market is regarded as the best market while comparing with the surrounding places.

== Demographics ==
Mulavana is a village situated in Kollam district's Kollam Taluka, Kerala and number of families residing in the village is 9289 according to 2011 Indian Census. The population of the Mulavana village is 35887 and 17038 of them are males and 18849 are females.

In the village population of children aged 0–6 is 3399, that is 9.47% of its total population. Mulavana village's Average Sex Ratio is 1106 which is higher than Kerala's Average Sex Ratio of 1084. Mulavana's Child Sex Ratio for according to the census is 1044, higher than Kerala's Child Sex Ratio of 964.

The village's literacy rate is higher compared to Kerala. In 2011, Mulavana village's literacy rate was 95.53% compared to 94.00% of Kerala. Male literacy in Mulavana is 96.69% and female literacy rate was 94.50%.

== Places of worship ==
- Mulavana Sree Madankavu Temple
- Mulavana Chokkamkuzhi Sree BhadraKali Bhagavati Temple. (ചൊക്കംകുഴി അമ്പലം )
- Perayam Bharanikavu Devi Temple
- Mulavana Mahadevar Temple
- Mulavana Nadukkunnil Bhadradevi temple
- Jumma Ath punnathadam
- Kristhuraj Church, Kottapuram,
- Perayam Marthoma Church
- Kanjiracode St Michale's Church
- St. Kuriakose Orthodox Church

== Schools ==
- Mulavana Govt. LP school
- MT LP School
- PKJM School
- SSLPS Mulavana
