= Ansiba Hassan =

Indian actress, television anchor and dancer (born 1992)

- Born: 18 June 1992 (age 34); Kozhikode, Kerala, India
- Other name: Geethika (in Tamil)
- Occupations: Actress; Model; Television host
- Years active: 2013–present
- Notable work: Drishyam (2013)
- Parent(s): Hassan, Rasiya

Ansiba Hassan (born 18 June 1992) is an Indian actress, television anchor and dancer who appears in Malayalam and Tamil films. Her most notable work in Malayalam film industry is Jeethu Joseph's 2013 hit Malayalam movie Drishyam. In 2024, she participated in Bigg Boss Malayalam 6 where she was evicted after 77 days.

Ansiba Hassan was elected as Joint Secretary of Association of Malayalam Movie Artists (AMMA) in 2025, but she resigned in 2026 after alleging harassment, including remarks of a communal nature.

== Early life ==
Ansiba was born 18 June 1992, the second daughter of six children born to parents Hassan and Rasiya in the Kozhikode district of Kerala, India. She has an elder brother, Anees, three younger brothers, Ashik, Asib and Afsal, and a younger sister Afsana.

== Filmography ==
Key
†	Denotes films that have not yet been released

Year	Title	Role	Language	Notes
2008	Innathe Chintha Vishayam	School girl	Malayalam	
2009	Sirithal Rasipen	Viji	Tamil	
2010	Annarakkannanum Thannalayathu	Radhika	Malayalam	credited as Nakshatra
2010	Kacheri Arambam	Sumati	Tamil	
2010	Aaravadhu Vanam	Anu	Tamil	
2010	Mandabam		Tamil	
2011	Konjam Veyil Konjam Mazhai	Gomathi	Tamil	
2012	Udumban	Rural girl	Tamil	credited as Geetika
2013	Nagaraja Cholan MA, MLA	Thaayi	Tamil	
2013	Drishyam	Anju George	Malayalam	
2014	Gunda	Sreekutty	Malayalam	
2014	Little Superman	Angel Wilson	Malayalam	
2015	She Taxi	Roopa Pilla	Malayalam	
2015	Lovemates	Lover	Malayalam	Short film
2015	The Other Side	Victim	Malayalam	Short film
2015	Paranjothi	Ganga	Tamil	
2015	Vishwasam... Athallae Ellaam	Salomi (Sali)	Malayalam	
2015	Uthara Chemmeen	Neelipennu	Malayalam	
2015	John Honayi	Maria	Malayalam	
2016	Appuram Bengal Ippuram Thiruvithamkoor	Saajitha	Malayalam	
2016	Kattappanayile Rithwik Roshan	Actress	Malayalam	Guest appearance
2017	Pareeth Pandari	Fazeela Pareeth	Malayalam	
2017	Paakanum Pola Irukku	Keerthik	Tamil	credited as Geethika
2017	Indulekha	Indulekha	Malayalam	
2018	A Live Story		Malayalam	As Director & Writer; Short film
2019	Pennoruthi	Gouri	Malayalam	
2021	Drishyam 2	Anju George	Malayalam	Sequel to Drishyam
2022	CBI 5: The Brain	CBI Officer Anitha Varma	Malayalam	
2023	Kurukkan	Anjitha	Malayalam	
2025	Police Day	Maniya	Malayalam	
2026	Drishyam 3	Anju George	Malayalam	
TBA	Badarul Muneer Husnul Jamal	Sulekha	Malayalam	
TBA	Zebra Varakal	Mary Cherian	Malayalam	
TBA	Allu and Arjun		Malayalam	Directorial debut

== Television ==
Year	Program	Role	Channel	Notes
2014	Ente Kuttikalam	Host	Kochu TV	
2015	Star Challenge	Contestant	Flowers TV	
2016	Maruhaba	Host	Flowers TV	
2016	Sell Me the Answer	Participant	Asianet	
2016	Lalettanodoppam	Host	Kaumudy TV	
2016	Onam Samam Payasam	Host	Kaumudy TV	
2016-2017	Comedy Super Night 2	Host	Flowers TV	Replaced Rachana Narayanankutty
2017	Maruhaba	Host	Flowers TV	
2017	Mammookka The Great Father	Host	Flowers TV	
2018	Nadanam Venulayam	Dancer	Mazhavil Manorama	
2018–2019	Marakkatha Swad	Host	Flowers TV	Replaced Arya
2018–2019	Mylanchi Monchu	Host	Flowers TV	
2021	Red Carpet	Mentor	Amrita TV	
2021	Comedy Stars	Mentor	Asianet	
2022	Ona Ruchimelam	Host	Asianet	
2024	Bigg Boss 6	Contestant	Asianet	Evicted Day 77
2024	Star Singer 9	Guest	Asianet	
2024	Enkile Ennodu Para	Contestant	Asianet	
2026	Comedy Cooks	Contestant	Asianet	
2026	Star Singer 10	Guest	Asianet	
2026	Bigg Boss 8	Challenger	Asianet	

== Controversies ==
In May 2026, Ansiba Hassan resigned from the joint secretary position of Association of Malayalam Movie Artists (AMMA). Hassan alleged that she had been subjected to mental harassment within the association and claimed that actor Tini Tom had spread rumours about her and referred to her using a communal slur. She further stated that these incidents contributed to her decision to resign from her position.

Tini Tom denied the allegations and challenged Hassan to provide evidence for her claims. Hassan also alleged that she received insufficient support from AMMA leadership regarding her complaints. The controversy later expanded after actress Lakshmi Priya stated that she had previously filed a police complaint against Hassan over a personal dispute while rejecting Hassan's allegations against members of the organisation.

Actress Neena Kurup supported Ansiba and later filed a separate complaint against Tini Tom alleging inappropriate behaviour during an association gathering, following which AMMA reportedly initiated internal proceedings and sought explanations from members involved in the dispute.

President of the organisation, Shwetha Menon later declined to comment further on the matter publicly, stating that the issue would be addressed through the organisation's internal mechanisms and upcoming general body meeting.

In June 2026, Hassan reiterated her allegations against AMMA during the association's general body meeting, stating that her complaints had not been adequately addressed and that she had not received justice within the organisation. Following the meeting, the entire governing committee resigned and a temporary committee was appointed to oversee the association's affairs.
