= Virginia Rodrigues (actress) =

Indian actress

- Born: 1977; Mangalore, Karnataka
- Occupation: Actress
- Years active: 2001–present

Virginia Rodrigues is an Indian actress, and author known for her works in Malayalam, Hindi, and Kannada language films, theatre, and television.

== Early life ==
She was born and brought up in Mangalore, Karnataka, India to Catholic family of Vincent Rodrigues and Hilda Rodrigues. She pursued her B.A degree from St. Agnes College, Mangalore.

== Theatre ==
Virginia largely worked in the theatre for more than two decades. She has been a member of Bangalore's Indian Ensemble and Mumbai's Mashaal theater groups. She has been part of international projects called "Zapperdockel and the cock" directed by Wally and Paul Schmidt from Germany. She also modeled in various television commercials.

== Filmography ==
Year	Title	Role	Language	Notes	Ref.
2016	Marupadi	Psychiatrist	Malayalam	Debut	
2017	Samarpanam	Sarvajaya	Malayalam		
2019	Mahira	Inspector Maya	Kannada		
2024	Love, Sitara	Latha	Hindi; Malayalam		

== Television ==
Year	Title	Role	Language	Notes	Ref.
2024	Love at 5th Floor	Dr. Uma	Hindi	Mini Series	
