= Achuth Mohandas =

Indian writer (born 1988)

- Born: 16 May 1988; Trivandrum, India
- Citizenship: India
- Occupations: writer, actor, radio jockey
- Notable work: Ormmayilliniyee Mukham; Sorry, I'm Taken; Money Back Policy

Achuth Mohandas is an Indian writer. He was a radio jockey (RJ) with Red FM 93.5 from 2008 to 2013. He is a graduate in Physics and started his career in the entertainment industry when he was 19 years old while pursuing his final year degree course.

== Early life ==
Achuth Mohandas (born Achuth B.) was born on 16, May 1988 in Trivandrum, India. He finished his schooling from Government Model Boys Higher Secondary School and Salvation Army Higher Secondary School. He secured his graduation in Physics from Mahatma Gandhi College under University of Kerala in the year 2008.

== Career ==
In 2008, he joined Red FM 93.5 as a Radio Jockey till 2013. After he turned into writing, publishing and media production.

He was also a video jockey (VJ) with Jai Hind TV, SS Entertainment Channel, Today TV, Asianet News, etc.

== Bibliography ==
- 'Mohandas, Achuth (20 May 2016). Sorry, I'm Taken. India: Infothrone (published 2016). ISBN 978-9352583126.

== Filmography ==
Year	Film	Language	Role
2013	Mr.Bean – The Laugh Riot	Malayalam	Actor
2013	Money Back Policy	Malayalam	Actor
