= RmKV =

Indian textile manufacturing company

RmKV Silks, also for commercial purposes branded as RmKV, is an Indian textile manufacturing company and a wedding silk retailer. The company operates outlets in across South Indian region and it manufactures wedding saris, silk fabrics and men's wear.

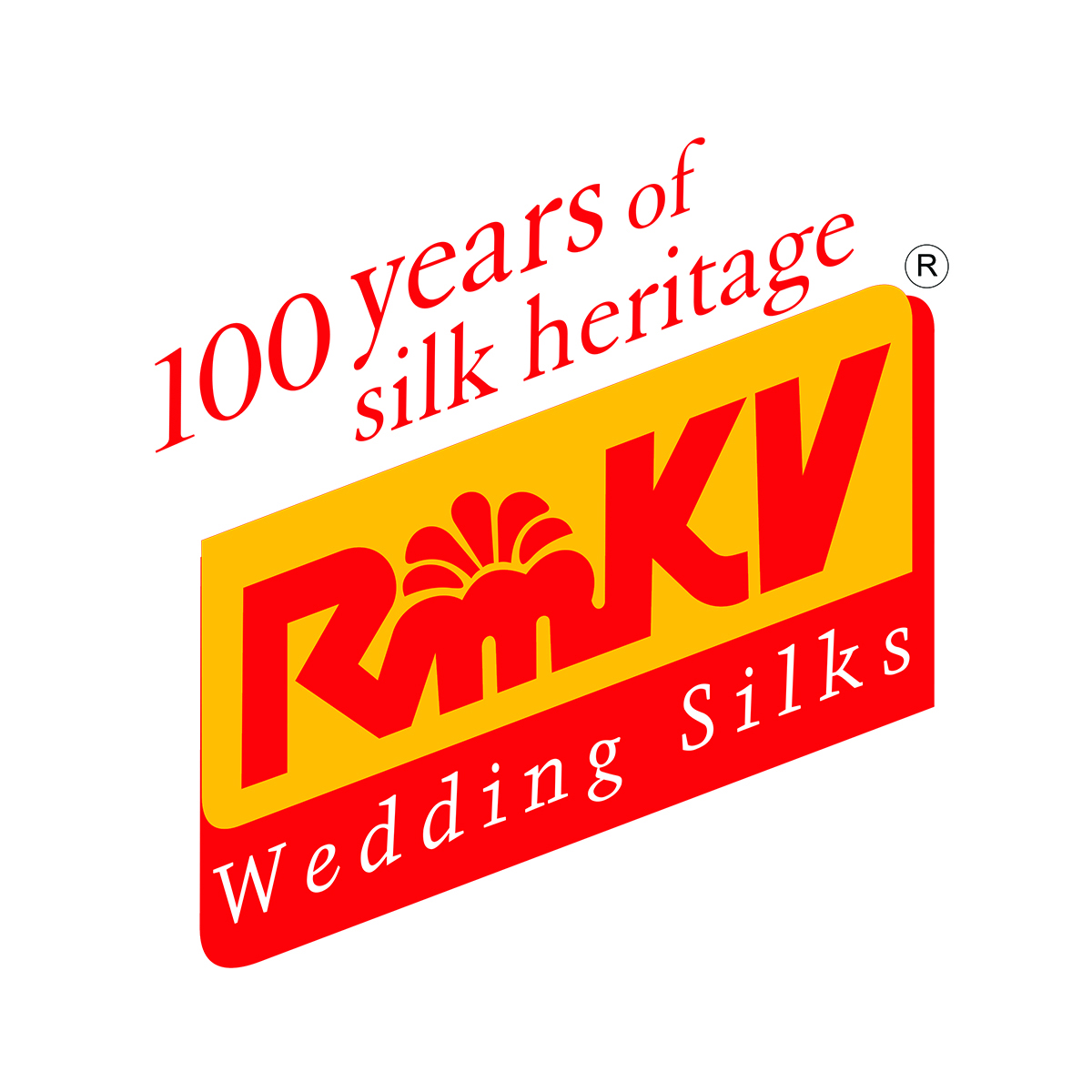
RmKV Silks logo

== Corporate history ==
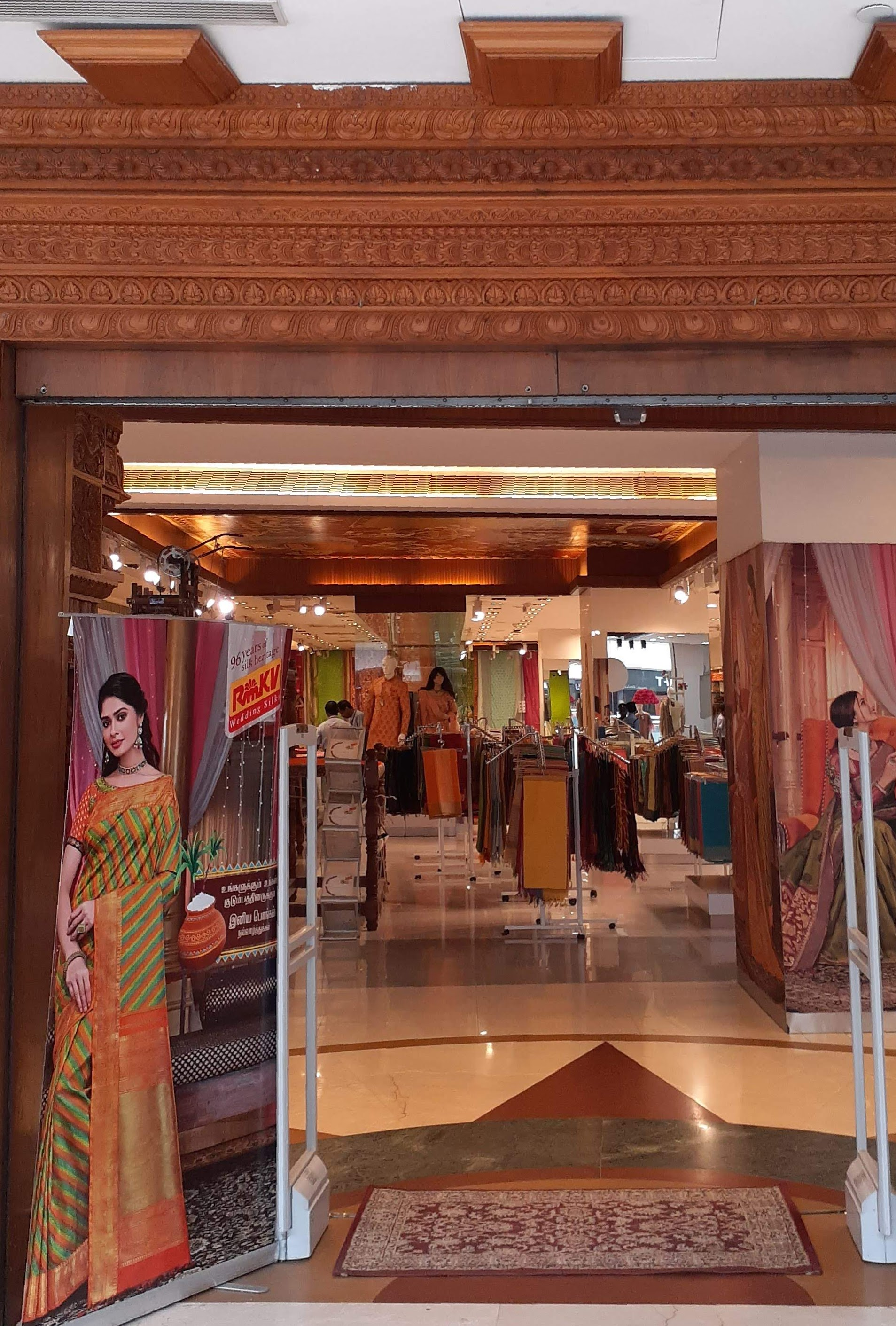
RmKV Silks in Chennai

RmKV Silks in Vannarapettai

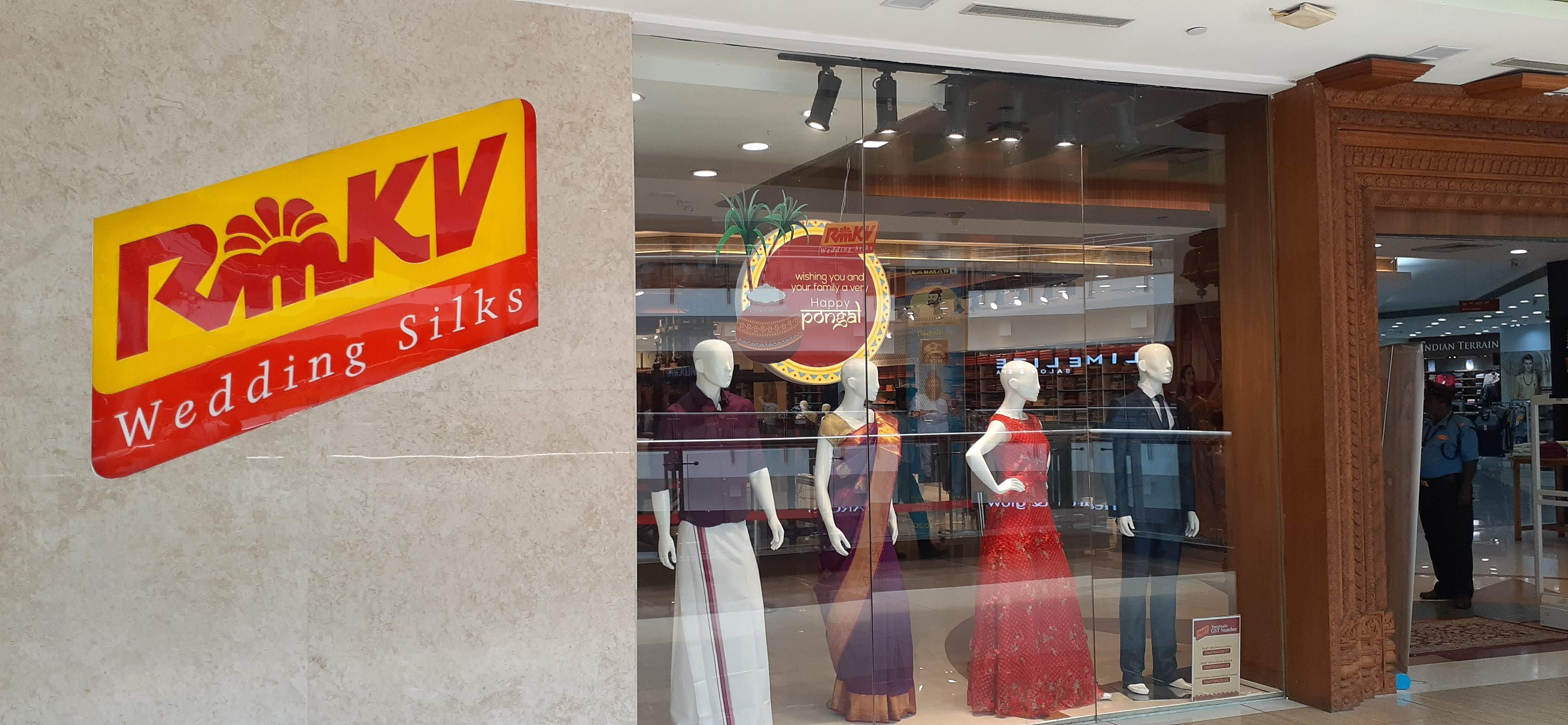
RmKV Silks putting up banner to mark Thai Pongal celebration

RmKV began business operations initially as a small scale business enterprise at Tirunelveli in 1924. The company was named as RmKV in honor of its founding father Rm K Visvanatha Pillai by using initials mentioned on his birth certificate.

The company made rapid strides by incorporating handloom silk weaving techniques to design and produce different types of sarees considering the evolution of the demographic aspects of women. The company also introduced natural silk saree which was a predominant product sold by RmKV Silks to their customer base. RmKV also initiated a French tapestry technique in their weaving method to replicate Raja Ravi Varma paintings on the saree designs. RmKV Silks also gained patent rights for its innovative novelty of lino silk saris, which weighs around 40% comparatively lesser than traditional silk sarees in general.

In 2015, RmKV introduced the modernised pneumatic handloom in order to expedite and speed up their processing of weaving silk fabrics and sarees at their manufacturing facilities. Modernised pneumatic handloom was developed by streamling the worflow of lifting the loom using compressed air. It was reported that RmKV pioneered the concept of modernised pneumatic handloom in the textile industry and RmKV applied patent rights through the National Research Development Corporation for their innovative concept of modernised pneumatic handloom.

In 2024, to mark the centennial year anniversary of RmKV company, a natural dyed silk saree was launched and the product was unveiled with over 4,000 colour design patterns. As of 2024, RmKV has been operating three showrooms in Chennai, and has been operating single showroom in Tirunelveli, Coimbatore and in Bengaluru.

== Philanthropy ==
RmKV started sponsoring an inter-school cultural competition called "kiddival" that was started in 1990 by the Rotaract Club of Tinnevelly (Parent club: Rotary Club of Tinnevelly). The first Kiddival was conducted in Sakuntala International Hotel complex in November 1990 to commemorate the children's day. Later the event was taken over by several Rotary clubs in Tirunelveli with the continuing support of RmKV, is held every year in the month of November. In the Kiddival conducted in 2006, the founding members of the event rejoined after 25years.

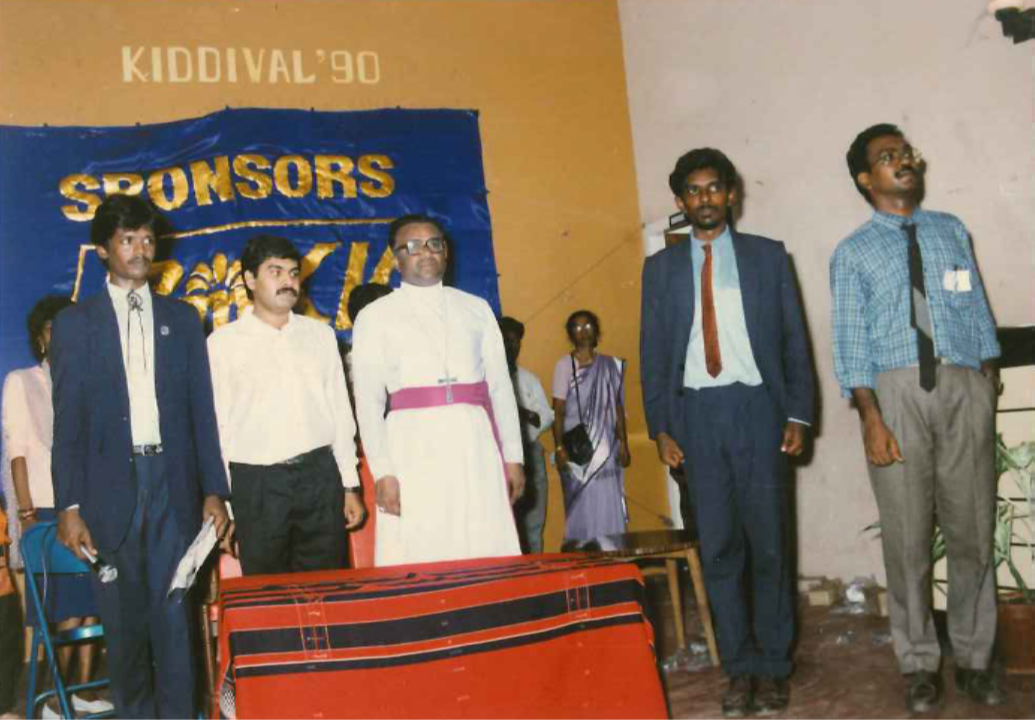
Samuel JK Abraham, RmKV K.Viswanathan, Rev. Jason Dharmaraj, Godwin J. Jawaharlal, John Sudhakar at the First Kiddival, November 1990, in Tirunelveli.

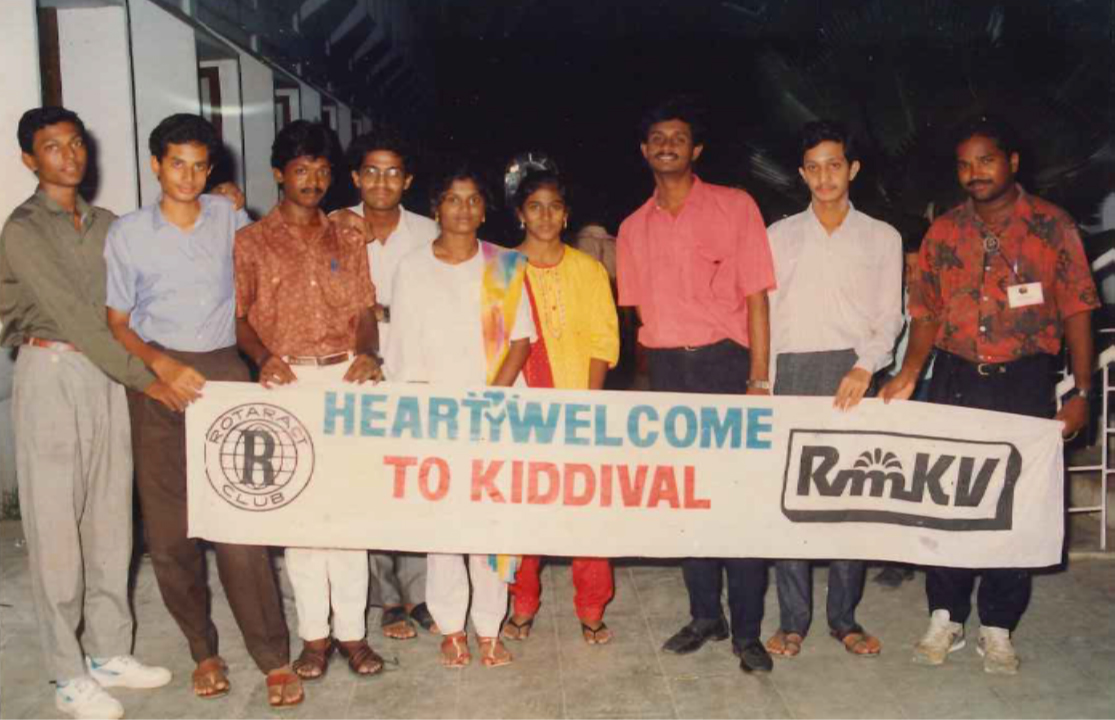
Members of Rotaract Club of Tinnevelly in the II Kiddival, November 1991, in Tirunelveli.
