= Bhagath Manuel =

Indian actor (born 1986)

- Born: 30 November 1986 (age 39); Muvattupuzha, Kerala India
- Education: H. M. Training College
- Occupation: Actor
- Years active: 2010–present
- Spouse: Shelin Cherian (m. 2019)
- Children: 2

Bhagath Manuel (born 30 November 1986) an Indian actor who acts in Malayalam films. He debuted in the 2010 film Malarvaadi Arts Club, directed by Vineeth Sreenivasan.

== Personal life ==
Bhagath Manuel was born on 30 November 1986 in Muvattupuzha, Kerala, India. He attended St Sebastian Higher School Secondary in Anicadu and graduated from H. M. Training College in Muvattupuzha.

He and his wife, Daliya, have a son who was born on 3 January 2017. The couple later divorced.

He married Shelin Cherian on 20 September 2019.

== Filmography ==
Key
†	Denotes films that have not yet been released

Year	Title	Role	Notes
2010	Malarvadi Arts Club	Purushu	
2011	The Metro	Usman	
2011	Doctor Love	Sudhi	
2012	Masters	Akhil	
2012	Ustad Hotel	Band member	
2012	Thattathin Marayathu	Hamza	
2012	Perinoru Makan	Satheesan	
2012	Bhoomiyude Avakashikal		
2013	Entry	Arjun	
2013	Housefull	Joe	
2013	Ithu Pathiramanal	Murukan	
2013	Money Back Policy	Prem	
2014	Hangover	Appu	
2014	Day Night	Sam	
2014	Asha Black	Sidhu	
2014	Monayi Angane Aanayi	Faizal	
2014	Actually	Vinay	
2014	Ormayundo Ee Mukham	Gautam's friend	
2015	Aadu Oru Bheegara Jeeviyanu	Krishnan Mandaram	
2015	Nellikka	Sandeep	
2015	Oru Vadakkan Selfie	Sailesh	
2015	Sir C. P.		
2015	Vishwasam... Athallae Ellaam	Willy	
2015	Adi Kapyare Kootamani	Harris	
2015	ATM	Shyam	
2016	Shyam	Sebin	
2016	Dooram	Sameer	
2016	Dhanayathra	Vivek	
2016	Popcorn	Joyee	
2016	Zoom	Praveen	
2017	Fukri	Franklin	
2017	Uppum Mulakum	Himself	TV serial
2017	Aadu 2	Krishnan Mandaram	
2017	Vishwa Vikhyatharaya Payyanmar	Saam	
2017	Oru Visheshapetta Biriyani Kissa	Paul Mathayi	
2017	Goodalochana	Athar	
2017	Sunday Holiday	J.K	
2017	Clint	Antony	
2018	Sukhamano Daveede	Daveed	
2018	Mandharam		
2018	Ottakoru Kaamukan	Leon Joseph	
2018	Kinar	Nanda Kumar	Simultaneously shot in Tamil as Keni
2019	Ningal Camera Nireekshanathilaanu		
2019	Kosrakollikal		
2019	Uyare	Abhi	
2019	Mr. & Ms. Rowdy	Pachu	
2019	Love Action Drama	Himself	Special appearance
2019	Vikruthi	Elleyas	
2019	Isakkinte Ithihasam	Gregory	
2020	Thanka Bhasma Kuriyita Thamburatty		
2021	Saajan Bakery Since 1962	Thankaran	
2021	Changayi		
2021	Bheemante Vazhi	Oothampilly Caspar	
2021	Keshu Ee Veedinte Nadhan		
2021	Vellaramkunnile Vellimeenukal		
2022	Lal Jose		
2022	19(1)(A)	Sakhavu	
2022	Kenkemam	Buddy	
2023	Phoenix	Ameer	
2024	Varshangalkku Shesham	Frederick	
2025	Anpodu Kanmani		
2025	Get-Set Baby		
2026	Aadu 3	Krishnan Mandaram	
2026	Udumbanchola Vision		
2026	Bouma		
