= List of Malayalam films of 2010 =

== Released films ==
The following is the list of Malayalam films released in 2010.

=== Malayalam films ===
Opening		Title	Director	Cast	Genre	Ref
J A N U A R Y	8	Black Stallion	Pramod – Pappan	Kalabhavan Mani, Namitha, Bala, Ashish Vidyarthi	Action	
J A N U A R Y	8	Kanmazha Peyyum Munpe ( കന്മഴ പെയ്യും മുമ്പേ )	Roy	Shafna, Arun, Thilakan	Romance	
J A N U A R Y	14	Happy Husbands	Saji Surendran	Jayaram, Jayasurya, Indrajith, Bhavana, Samvrutha, Vandana, Rima	Comedy	
J A N U A R Y	21	Brahmasthram ( ബ്രഹ്മാസ്ത്രം )	V. Somanath	Saiju Kurup, Jagathy	Action	
J A N U A R Y	22	Punyam Aham ( പുണ്യം അഹം )	Raj Nair	Prithviraj, Samvrutha, Nedumudi Venu	Romance	
J A N U A R Y	23	Body Guard	Siddique	Dileep, Nayanthara, Mithra Kurian, Thyagarajan, Undapakru	Romance	
J A N U A R Y	27	Drona 2010	Shaji Kailas	Mammootty, Kanika, Thilakan, Navya Nair, Manoj K. Jayan, Dhanya Mary Varghese	Thriller	
J A N U A R Y	29	Senior Mandrake	Ali Akbar	Jagathy Sreekumar, Charutha, Jagadeesh, Kalpana, Suraj Venjaramood	Comedy	
J A N U A R Y	29	Thathwamasi ( തത്ത്വമസി )	Viswa Chaithanya	Vineeth, Lakshmi Gopalaswamy, Manikuttan	Drama	
F E B R U A R Y	5	Yugapurushan ( യുഗപുരുഷൻ )	R. Sukumaran	Thalaivasal Vijay, Mammootty, Kalabhavan Mani, Babu Antony, Navya Nair, Jishnu Raghavan	Docudrama	
F E B R U A R Y	12	Aagathan ( ആഗതൻ)	Kamal	Dileep, Charmy, Sathyaraj, Innocent, Biju Menon	Romance, thriller	
F E B R U A R Y	19	Annarakkannanum Thannalayathu ( അണ്ണാറക്കണ്ണനും തന്നാലായതു്)	Prakash	Kalabhavan Mani, Jayashree, Suraaj, Nakshatra, Jagathy Sreekumar, Thilakan	Romance, drama	
F E B R U A R Y	19	Sufi Paranja Katha (സൂഫി പറഞ്ഞ കഥ )	Priyanandanan	Prakash, Sona Nair, Sharbani Mukherjee, Thampy Antony, Samvrutha, Jagathy	Romance, drama	
F E B R U A R Y	26	Cheriya Kallanum Valiya Policum ( ചെറിയ കള്ളനും വലിയ പോലീസും )	Haridas Kesavan	Mukesh, Jagadish, Vidya, Dhanya Mary Varghese	Comedy	
F E B R U A R Y	26	Nanthuni ( നന്തുണി )	Hari Narayanan	Vijayaraghavan, Mithuna, Govindhan Kutty	Drama	
M A R C H	4	Valiyangadi ( വലിയങ്ങാടി)	Salim Baba	Manikuttan, Shwetha Menon	Action	
M A R C H	12	Rhythm	M. S. PradeepKumar	Shanavas, Adithyan, Prashanth, Anjali		
M A R C H	6	Kausthubham ( കൗസ്തുഭം )	Sajeev Kilikulam	Sai Kumar, Sukumari, Karthika	Drama	
M A R C H	19	Nayakan ( നായകൻ )	Lijo Jose Pellisery	Indrajith, Dhanya Mary Varghese, Thilakan	Action	
M A R C H	19	Thanthonni ( താന്തോന്നി )	George Varghese	Prithviraj, Sheela, Ambika, Suraj Venjaramood	Action, drama	
M A R C H	25	In Ghost House Inn	Lal	Mukesh, Siddique, Jagadish, Ashokan, Nedumudi Venu, Lakshmi Rai	Horror, comedy	
M A R C H	26	Pramani ( പ്രമാണി )	B. Unnikrishnan	Mammootty, Siddique, Prabhu, Sneha, Fahad Fazil, Lakshmi, Suraj Venjaramood	Drama	
M A R C H	26	Kadaksham ( കടാക്ഷം )	Sasi Paravoor	Suresh Gopi, Shwetha Menon, Shwetha Vijay	Drama, action	
A P R I L	1	April Fool	Viji Thampi	Jagadish, Siddique, Nayana, Maithili, Biju Menon	Comedy	
A P R I L	8	Janakan ( ജനകൻ)	Sanjeev N.R	Mohanlal, Suresh Gopi, Jyothirmayi, Biju Menon, Harisree Asokan	Suspense, thriller	
A P R I L	14	Paappi Appacha ( പാപ്പി അപ്പച്ചാ )	Mammas	Dileep, Kavya Madhavan, Innocent, Ashokan, KPAC Lalitha, Suresh Krishna	Action, comedy	
A P R I L	15	Pulliman ( പുള്ളിമാൻ )	Anil K. Nair	Kalabhavan Mani, Meera Nandan, Salim Kumar, Ashokan, Jagathy Sreekumar	Romance, drama	
A P R I L	15	T. D. Dasan Std. VI B	Mohan Raghavan	Biju Menon, Suresh Krishna, Jagathy Sreekumar, Valsala Menon	Drama	
A P R I L	17	Njaan Sanchaari	Ajith Nair			
M A Y	7	Pokkiri Raja ( പോക്കിരിരാജ )	Vaishakh Abraham	Mammootty, Prithviraj, Shriya Saran, Nedumudi Venu, Siddique	Action, comedy	
M A Y	7	Alexander The Great	Murali Nagavally	Mohanlal, Bala, Aswathy, Nedumudi Venu, Jagatheesh	Comedy, thriller	
M A Y	7	Kadha Thudarunnu ( കഥ തുടരുന്നു )	Sathyan Anthikkad	Jayaram, Mamta Mohandas, Asif Ali, Innocent	Drama	
M A Y	14	Canvas	Shaji-Rajasekharan	Kalabhavan Mani, Vidya	Drama	
M A Y	21	Mummy & Me	Jeethu Joseph	Kunchacko Boban, Archana Kavi, Mukesh, Uravashi, Suresh Gopi, Lalu Alex	Family, comedy	
J U N E	4	Ringtone	Ajmal	Suresh Gopi, Bala, Rajan P. Dev, Megha Nair	Action, thriller	
J U N E	6	Jalachhayam (ജലച്ചായം)	Sathish Kalathil	Baburaj Puthoor, Dr. B. Jayakrishnan, Prasanna Balan, Kripa, Master Navin Krishna	Experimental film, art film	
J U N E	20	Thoovalkattu ( തൂവൽക്കാറ്റു്)	Venu B. Nair	Manoj K Jayan, Lakshmi Gopalaswamy	Drama	
J U N E	25	Nalla Pattukare ( നല്ല പാട്ടുകാരേ )	K. S. Sivachandran	Vijay Madhav, Najim Arshad, Sannidanandan	Musical, drama	
J U N E	27	Text Book	Satheesh Kandanchira	Ganesh, Sony, Deckey		
J U L Y	9	Nallavan ( നല്ലവൻ )	Aji John	Jayasurya, Mythili, Sai Kumar, Siddique, Suraj Venjaramood	Action, romance	
J U L Y	9	Oru Naal Varum ( ഒരു നാൾ വരും )	T. K. Rajeev Kumar	Mohanlal, Sreenivasan, Sameera Reddy, Devayani, Suraj Venjaramood	Suspense, comedy	
J U L Y	16	Apoorvaragam ( അപൂർവരാഗം )	Sibi Malayil	Nishan, Asif Ali, Vinay Forrt, Nithya Menon	Romance, thriller	
J U L Y	16	Malarvaadi Arts Club ( മലർവാടി ആർട്ട്സ്‌ ക്ലബ്ബ്‌ )	Vineeth Sreenivasan	Nivin Pauly, Sharavan, Aju, Harikrishnan, Bhagath Manuel, Suraj Venjaramoodu, Praveen, Geetu, Revathy, Nedumudi Venu, Salim Kumar, Jagathy Sreekumar	Musical, comedy	
J U L Y	23	Sakudumbam Shyamala ( സകുടുംബം ശ്യാമള )	Radhakrishnan Mangalath	Urvashi, Kunchacko Boban, Bhama, Nedumudi Venu, Sai Kumar	Family, comedy	
J U L Y	23	Kutty Srank ( കുട്ടിസ്രാങ്കു് )	Shaji N. Karun	Mammootty, Kamalinee Mukherjee, Padmapriya, Meenakumari	Drama	
J U L Y	29	Penpattanam ( പെൺപട്ടണം )	V M Vinu	Kailash, Vishnupriya, Shweta Menon, K.P.A.C. Lalitha, Revathy, Nedumudi Venu, Lal	Family, thriller	
J U L Y	29	Upadeshiyude Makan ( ഉപദേശിയുടെ മകൻ )	Joshy Mathew	Ganesh Kumar, Divya Unni, Kavitha Nair	Drama	
J U L Y	30	Advocate Lakshmanan – Ladies Only ( അഡ്വക്കേറ്റ്‌ ലക്ഷ്മണൻ – ലേഡീസ്‌ ഒൺലി )	Pappan Payattuvila	Mukesh, Mallika Kapoor, Suraj Venjaramood	Comedy	
J U L Y	30	Avan ( അവൻ )	Nandakumar Kavil	Vijay Yesudas, Bala, Muktha, Riaz Khan	Action, musical	
J U L Y	30	Taskkara Lahala ( തസ്ക്കര ലഹള )	Ramesh Das	Suraj Venjaramood, Lakshmi Sharma, Salim Kumar, Bijukuttan, Jaffer Idukki, Bheeman Reghu, Thesni Khan	Comedy	
J U L Y	30	Raama Raavanan രാമരാവണൻ	Biju Vattappara	Suresh Gopi, Mithra Kurian	Romance	
A U G U S T	6	Ammanilavu ( അമ്മനിലാവു് )	M. D. Rajendran	Sasi Ayyanchira, Aparna, Mallika	Action	
A U G U S T	13	Patham Adhyayam ( പത്താമദ്ധ്യായം )	P. K. Radhakrishnan	Bala, Udhayathara	Romance	
A U G U S T	13	Plus Two	Shebi Chavakkad	Roshan, Vishnu Mohan, Shafna, Justing John, Deepak Murali	Youth	
A U G U S T	13	Idayan ( ഇടയൻ )	Santosh Sauparnika	John Mathew, Rajeev Rangan, Santosh, Sidhraj	History	
A U G U S T	20	Yakshiyum Njanum ( യക്ഷിയും ഞാനും )	Vinayan	Gautham, Meghana Raj, Jubil Raj, Thilakan	Horror, romance	
A U G U S T	20	Paattinte Palazhy ( പാട്ടിന്റെ പാലാഴി )	Rajeev Anchal	Manoj K.Jayan, Meera Jasmine, Revathy, Nedumudi Venu	Musical, romance	
A U G U S T	20	Aathmakatha ( ആത്മകഥ )	Prem Lal	Sreenivasan, Sharbani Mukherjee, Jagathy Sreekumar	Drama	
A U G U S T	20	Neelambari ( നീലാംബരി )	Hari Narayanan	Vineeth, Anoop Menon, Bhama	Drama	
A U G U S T	20	3 Char Sau Bees ( 3 ചാർ സൗ ബീസ് )	Govindan Kutty	Govindan Kutty, Dhanya Mary Varghese, Rahul Menon, Anu Anandhan	Comedy	
A U G U S T	27	Fiddle	Prabhakaran Muthana	Varun J. Thilak, Ayilya, Jagathy Sreekumar	Romance	
A U G U S T	27	Nirakazhcha ( നിറക്കാഴ്ച )	Anish J. Karrinad	Mamta Mohandas, Manoj K. Jayan, Vincenzo Bocciarelli, Nicole	Romance	
A U G U S T	27	9 KK Road	Simon Kuruvila	Babu Antony, Vijayaraghavan, Shammi Thilakan, Nishanth Sagar	Action, thriller	
S E P T E M B E R	3	Inganeyum Oral ( ഇങ്ങനെയും ഒരാൾ )	Kabeer Rowther	Vinu Mohan, Sai Kumar, Praveena, Indrans	Family, romance	
S E P T E M B E R	3	24 Hrs	Aditya Sam	Kuldeep, Manoj K. Jayan, Komal	Thriller	
S E P T E M B E R	9	Shikkar (ശിക്കാർ)	M. Padmakumar	Mohanlal, Kailash, Sneha, Mythili, Lakshmi Gopalaswamy, Ananya	Suspense, thriller	
S E P T E M B E R	10	Elsamma Enna Aankutty ( എൽസമ്മ എന്ന ആൺകുട്ടി )	Lal Jose	Ann Augustine, Indrajith, Kunchacko Boban, Vani Kishore	Family	
S E P T E M B E R	10	Pranchiyettan & the Saint ( പ്രാഞ്ചിയേട്ടൻ ആന്റ്‌ ദി സെയിന്റ്‌ )	Ranjith	Mammootty, Siddique, Khushbu, Priyamani	Satire	
S E P T E M B E R	17	Vande Matharam ( വന്ദേ മാതരം )	Aravinda Raj	Mammootty, Arjun, Sneha, Deepak Jethi	Patriotic	
O C T O B E R	8	Chekavar ( ചേകവർ )	Sajeevann	Indrajith, Kalabhavan Mani, Samvrutha Sunil, Sarayoo	Action, family	
O C T O B E R	8	Oridathoru Postman ( ഒരിടത്തൊരു പോസ്റ്റ്മാൻ )	Shaji Aziz	Kunchacko Boban, Sarath Kumar, Meera Nandan, Innocent	Drama	
O C T O B E R	15	Anwar ( അന്‍വര്‍ )	Amal Neerad	Prithviraj, Mamta Mohandas, Lal, Prakash Raj	Action	
O C T O B E R	20	Summer Palace	K. Murali	Krishna Kumar, Mayoori		
O C T O B E R	22	Cocktail	Arun Kumar	Jayasurya, Samvrutha Sunil, Anoop Menon	Thriller	
O C T O B E R	22	Sadgamaya ( സദ്ഗമയ )	Harikumar	Suresh Gopi, Navya Nair, Shweta Menon	Drama	
O C T O B E R	28	Four Friends	Saji Surendran	Jayaram, Meera Jasmine, Jayasurya, Kunchacko Boban, Kamal Haasan	Drama	
O C T O B E R	30	Nilavu (നിലാവ്)	Ajith Nair	Haridas, Sunita Nedungadi, Sreelekha	Romance	
N O V E M B E R	5	Kaaryasthan ( കാര്യസ്ഥൻ )	Thomson K Thomas	Dileep, Akhila, Vandana Menon	Slapstick comedy	
N O V E M B E R	5	Chithrakuzhal ( ചിത്രക്കുഴൽ )	Majeed Gulistan	Amal Ashok, Sidharth, Meera Nair, Madhu, Vijayaraghavan, Geetha Vijayan	Children's	
N O V E M B E R	12	Holidays	M M Ramachandran	Vinu Mohan, Kalabhavan Mani, Ranjith Menon, Muktha, Priya Lal	Romance	
N O V E M B E R	12	Pathinonnil Vyazham ( പതിനൊന്നിൽ വ്യാഴം )	Suresh Krishna	Mukesh, Manya	Comedy	
N O V E M B E R	12	De Nova	Swabri	Ajmal Ameer, Auroshika, V.K Sriraman, Kannan Malhotra	Family	
N O V E M B E R	17	The Thriller	B. Unnikrishnan	Prithviraj, Katherine Theresa, Siddique, Lalu Alex, Sampath Raj, Mallika Kapoor	Thriller	
N O V E M B E R	17	Best of Luck	M. A. Nishad	Prabhu, Urvashi, Mammootty (cameo)	Comedy	
N O V E M B E R	19	College Days	G. N. Krishnakumar	Indrajith, Bhama, Sandhya	Campus, romance	
N O V E M B E R	19	Koottukar ( കൂട്ടുകാർ )	Prasad Vaalacheril	Vinu Mohan, Bhama	Youth, romance	
N O V E M B E R	19	Kanyakumari Express	T. S. Suresh Babu	Suresh Gopi, Lena, Babu Antony, Sarayu	Action	
N O V E M B E R	26	Oru Small Family ( ഒരു സ്മോൾ ഫാമിലി )	Rajasenan	Rajasenan, Seetha, Kailash, Ananya	Family	
N O V E M B E R	26	Swantham Bharya Zindabad ( സ്വന്തം ഭാര്യ സിന്ദാബാദ്‌ )	Biju Vattappara	Guinness Pakru, Sruthilakshmi, Mukesh	Family	
D E C E M B E R	3	Sahasram ( സഹസ്രം )	Dr. Janardhanan	Suresh Gopi, Lakshmi Gopalaswamy, Bala, Sarayu	Thriller	
D E C E M B E R	3	Again Kasargod Khader Bhai	Thulasidas	Jagadish, Radha Varma, Innocent	Comedy	
D E C E M B E R	9	Best Actor	Martin Prackat	Mammootty, Shruthi Krishnan, Lal, Nedumudi Venu	Comedy, family	
D E C E M B E R	10	Chaverpada (ചാവേർപ്പട)	T. S. Jaspal	Bala Manikuttan, Arun, Muktha	Action	
D E C E M B E R	16	Kandahar ( കാണ്ഡഹാർ )	Major Ravi	Mohanlal, Amitabh Bachchan, Kaveri Jha, Parvathy Omanakuttan	Thriller	
D E C E M B E R	25	Marykkundoru Kunjaadu ( മേരിക്കുണ്ടൊരു കുഞ്ഞാടു് )	Shafi	Dileep, Bhavana, Biju Menon	Comedy	
D E C E M B E R	25	Tournament	Lal	Fahad Fazil, Praveen, Manu, Roopa	Romance, sport	
D E C E M B E R	31	Karayilekku Oru Kadal Dooram ( കരയിലേക്ക്‌ ഒരു കടൽ ദൂരം )	Vinod Mankara	Indrajith, Mamta Mohandas, Dhanya Mary Varghese	Drama	
D E C E M B E R	31	Puthumukhangal (പുതുമുഖങ്ങൾ)	Don Alex, Biju Majeed	Angel Agarwal, Silsil, Helan, Nima, Unnimaya, Suraj Venjaramoodu, Innocent, Salim Kumar	Campus	

== Dubbed films ==
Movies dubbed into Malayalam
Opening	Title	Director(s)	Original film		Cast	Ref.
Opening	Title	Director(s)	Film	Language	Cast	Ref.
8 January	Kerala KiranBedi (കേരള കിരൺബേഡി)	N. Om Prakash Rao	Kannadadda Kiran Bedi	Kannada	Malashri, Ashish Vidyarthi	
5 February	Arya 2 ( ആര്യ2 )	Sukumar	Arya 2	Telugu	Allu Arjun, Kajal Aggarwal	
9 June	Varan ( വരൻ )	Gunasekhar	Varudu	Telugu	Allu Arjun, Arya, Bhanu Sri Mehra	
30 July	Ishtam Enikkishtam ( ഇഷ്ടം എനിക്കിഷ്ടം )	Prakash	Milana	Kannada	Puneeth Rajkumar, Parvathy Thiruvothu; Pooja Gandhi	
20 August	Arjun ( അർജ്ജുൻ )	Parasuram	Anjaneyulu	Telugu	Ravi Teja, Nayantara	
15 October	Arundhati ( അരുന്ധതി )	Kodi Ramakrishna	Arundhati	Telugu	Anushka Shetty, Sonu Sood, Arjan Bajwa, Sayaji Shinde	
22 October	Khilladi – The Robber ( കില്ലാടി )	Krish	Vedam	Telugu	Allu Arjun, Anushka Shetty, Lekha Washington	
31 December	Pournami Nagam ( പൗർണ്ണമി നാഗം )	Kodandarami Reddy	Punnami Nagu	Telugu	Rajeev Kanakala, Mumaith Khan, Amjad Khan	

== Notable deaths ==
Film personalities who died
Month	Date	Name	Age	Profession	Notable films
February	2	Cochin Haneefa	58	Actor, director	Valtsalyam (Director) • Kireedam • Aniyathi Pravu • Punjabi House • Pulival Kalyanam • Mahanadhi
February	10	Girish Puthenchery	49	Lyricist, screenwriter	Madampi • Devaasuram • Thenmavin Kombath • Summer in Bethlahem • Balettan Johny Walker, Pattalam.
April	13	Santhosh Jogi	36	Actor, singer	Mayavi • Keerthichakra • Nasrani
April	20	M. K. Kamalam	86	Actress (heroine of the first talkie in Malayalam), playback singer	Balan • Shayanam
April	23	Sreenath	53	Actor	Ithu Njangalude Katha • Shalini Ente Koottukari • Oru CBI Diary Kurippu • Sarvakalasala • Kireedam
June	5	Chelangattu Gopalakrishnan	77	Film critic	Malayala Cinema Chartithram (author)
June	16	P. G. Viswambharan	64	Director	Sphodanam • Sandhyaykku Virinja Poovu • Kaattu Kuthira • Gajakesariyogam
June	26	Adoor Pankajam	85	Actress	Chemmeen • Aye Auto • Kathapurushan
July	2	M. G. Radhakrishnan	73	Music director, playback singer	Manichithrathazhu • Devasuram • Anandabhadram
August	4	Nirmal Prakash	53	Dubbing artist, actor	Kireedam (dubbing artist) • Vesham • Sooryan (actor)
August	18	Subair P. P.	48	Actor	Nadiya Kollappetta Rathri • Bharathchandran I.P.S. • Lelam • Roudram
August	24	Ravi Varma Kunjikkuttan Thampuran	74	Actor	Kalyanaraman • Ulladakkam • Mookkilla Rajyathu • Godfather
August	31	S. Pavamani	78	Producer, distributor	Chenda • Avalude Ravukal • Ayodhya • Uyarangalil
September	9	Venu Nagavally	61	Actor, director	Yavanika • Sukhamo Devi (director) • Lal Salam (director) • Minnaram • Shalini Ente Koottukari • Rakthasakshikal Sindabad (director)
September	12	Swarnalatha	37	Playback singer	Ravanaprabhu • Varnapakittu • Punjabi House
November	20	Kozhikode Santha Devi	85	Actress	Moodupadam • Kunjali Marakkar • Iruttinte Aatmavu • Yamanam
November	22	Mankada Ravi Varma	83	Director, cinematographer	Nokkukuthi (director) • Swayamvaram • Nizhalkuthu • Olavum Theeravum • Mathilukal
