= Tejaswini Niranjana =

Indian cultural theorist

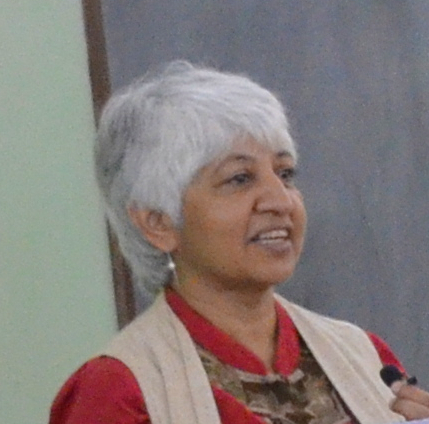
Tejaswini Niranjana, speaking at a conference.

Tejaswini Niranjana (born 26 July 1958) is an Indian professor, cultural theorist, translator and author. She is best known for her contribution to the fields of culture studies, gender studies, translation, and ethnomusicology (particularly relating to different forms of Indian music). She is the daughter of Kannada playwright and novelist Niranjana and writer Anupama Niranjana. Her partner is Indian author and cultural theorist, Ashish Rajadhyaksha.

In 2021, Tejaswini Niranjana was awarded the American Literary Translators Association Prize for Prose Fiction Translation for No Presents Please, a translation of author Jayant Kaikini's short stories centred around the city of Mumbai. In 2019, No Presents Please was awarded the DSC Prize for South Asian Literature 2018, which Niranjana shared jointly with Jayant Kaikini.

She is the recipient of the 2018 Humanities and Social Sciences Prestigious Fellowship, Research Grants Council, Hong Kong. Niranjana was also awarded the Karnataka Sahitya Akademi Award for Best Translation of 1994.

Niranjana is best known for her theory of the relationship between colonialism and translation, writings on feminism and the 'culture question' in India, and her practice-based research into music (specifically Caribbean music, Hindustani classical music, and India-China collaborations).

Niranjana has an M.A. in English and Aesthetics from the University of Bombay, an MPhil in Linguistics from the University of Pune, and a PhD from the University of California, Los Angeles.

Niranjana was the co-founder and a senior fellow at the Centre for Study of Culture and Society, Bangalore, where she was also Lead Researcher in the HEIRA Program. Currently, Niranjana serves as the director, Centre for Inter-Asian Research; and as Dean of Online Programmes, Ahmedabad University.

== Life and work ==
Born in Dharwad, India to the Kannada playwright and novelist Niranjana and writer Anupama Niranjana, Niranjana moved to Bangalore, India at the age of 2. She completed her schooling in Bangalore at The Home School (1962–1971); Mahila Seva Samaja (1971–1974), attended pre-University at the National College, Jayanagar (1974–76), and an undergraduate degree from the National College, Basavangudi, Bangalore (1976–79).

Later, she completed an M.A. in English and Aesthetics from the University of Bombay, an MPhil in Linguistics from the University of Pune, and a PhD from the University of California, Los Angeles.

Since 2021, Niranjana serves as the director, Centre for Inter-Asian Research; and as Dean of Online Programmes, Ahmedabad University.

Niranjana was the co-founder and a senior fellow at the Centre for Study of Culture and Society, Bangalore, where she was also Lead Researcher in the HEIRA Program. She was the chair at the Centre for Indian Languages in Higher Education at the Tata Institute of Social Sciences, Mumbai from 2012 till 2016.

From 2016 to 2021, she was a professor and head of the Department of Cultural Studies, at Lingnan University, Hong Kong, and visiting professor with the School of Arts and Science at Ahmedabad University. She was the chair of the Inter-Asia Cultural Studies Society.

She is the conceptualiser and co-producer of Jahaji Music, a documentary, starring Indian-Portuguese musician Remo Fernandes, that looks at musical forms in the Indian diaspora in the Caribbean. The film's title translates to "Ship's Music" which is a reference to the ships that carried indentured labour settlers from East India to French-Trinidad in the mid 19th century. The film, co-produced by filmmaker Surabhi Sharma, connected the worlds of gender, music and migration and was well received by the media.

She is also the author of Musicophilia in Mumbai, which examines the cultural, political and geographical reasons why Mumbai (formerly known as Bombay) became such a popular centre for Hindustani music. In a 2014 interview with Online Indian Women's magazine The Ladies Finger, she detailed her research process for this project, which she describes as part ethnographic, part archival work and several interviews. As part of the same project, she once again collaborated with filmmaker Surabhi Sharma to produce the film Phir Se Sam Pe Aana (Returning to the first beat).

She was a distinguished fellow at the Centre for Internet and Society, Bangalore from 2013 till 2016 . She is also the recipient of the Sephis Postdoctoral Fellowship (1997–1999), Sawyer Fellow at the University of Michigan; Rockefeller Fellow, University of Chicago, and the Homi Bhabha National Fellowship. She was awarded the Central Sahitya Akademi Award for Best Translation Into English (1993), and the Karnataka State Sahitya Akademi Award for Best Translation (1994).

She has lecturedin the West Indies, Brazil, South Africa, Japan, Taiwan, the U.S., and the U.K. She learned music for a decade from Mumbai-based Gwalior gharana singer Neela Bhagwat.

Teju is also known in academic circles for her keen efforts in creating a bi-lingual pedagogy manual for classrooms in Indian Higher Education classrooms. Initial research toward this was carried out with fellow feminist scholar Sharmila Rege.

In 2009, she was part of a 180 strong list of Indian Academics who opposed Section 377 of the Indian Penal Code, on the grounds that it was anti-democratic.

== Publications ==
=== Books ===
- Musicophilia in Mumbai: Performing Subjects and the Metropolitan Unconscious (Durham: Duke University Press, 2020)
- Mobilizing India: Women, Migration and Music between India and Trinidad (Durham: Duke University Press, 2006)
- Siting Translation: History, Post-Structuralism and the Colonial Context (Berkeley: University of California Press, 1992)

=== Edited volumes ===
- Music, Modernity, and Publicness in India (Delhi: Oxford University Press, 2020).
- Breaking the Silo: Integrating Science Education in India - With K.Sridhar and Anup Dhar, (Delhi: Orient Blackswan, 2017).
- Genealogies of the Asian Present: Situating Inter-Asia Cultural Studies - With Wang Xiaoming (Delhi: Orient Blackswan, 2015).
- Streevaadi Vimarshe - With Seemanthini Niranjana, in Kannada [Feminist Literary Criticism in India] (Bangalore: Kannada Sangha, Christ College, 1994).
- Interrogating Modernity: Culture and Colonialism in India - With P. Sudhir and Vivek Dhareshwar, (Calcutta: Seagull Books, 1993).

=== Selected articles in books ===
- "Colonialism and the Politics of Translation", in An Other Tongue: Nation and Ethnicity in the Linguistic Borderlands, ed. Alfred Arteaga (Durham: Duke University Press, 1994).
- "Colonialism and the Aesthetics of Translation", in Interrogating Modernity: Culture and Colonialism in India, (eds.) Tejaswini Niranjana, P. Sudhir and Vivek Dhareshwar (Calcutta: Seagull Books, 1993).
- "Translation, Colonialism, and the Rise of English", in Rethinking English: Essays in Literature, Language, History, ed. Svati Joshi (Delhi: Trianka, 1992).
- "Indian nationalism and Female Sexuality: A Trinidadian Tale", in Sex and the citizen: interrogating the Caribbean, ed. Faith Smith(Charlottesville : University of Virginia Press, 2011).
- "Hindi Cinema and Popular Music in Trinidad", in Remembered Rhythms, (eds.) Shubha Chaudhuri and Anthony Seeger (Kolkata : Seagull Books, 2010).
- "Gender and the Media: Problems for Cultural History", in Re-Figuring Culture: History, Theory and the Aesthetic in Contemporary India ed. Satish Poduval (Delhi : Sahitya Akademi, 2005).
- "Vigilantism and the Pleasures of Masquerade: The Female Spectators of Vijayasanthi Films", in City Flicks, ed. Preben Kaarsholm(Roskilde University: Occasional Paper Series, 2002).
- "Nationalism Refigured: Contemporary South Indian Cinema and the Subject of Feminism", in Community, Gender and Violence: Subaltern Studies XI, (eds.) Partha Chatterjee and Pradeep Jeganathan (Delhi: Permanent Black, 2000).
- (with Vivek Dhareshwar), "Kaadalan and the Politics of Resignification", in Making Meaning in Indian Cinema, ed. Ravi Vasudevan (Delhi: Oxford University Press, 2000).

=== Selected articles in journals ===
- "English Education in the Multi-lingual Classroom", Inter-Asia Cultural Studies 16:2 (2015)
- "Culture, Feminism, Globalization", Introduction to Special Issue-Women's Studies, Economic and Political Weekly 50:17 (2015), 25 April.
- "Music in the Balance: Language, Modernity and Hindustani Sangeet in Dharwad", Economic and Political Weekly XLVIII: 2, (12 January 2013), 41–48.
- "Why Culture Matters: Rethinking the Language of Feminist Politics", Inter-Asia Cultural Studies 11:2 (2010), 229–235.
- "Transported by Song: Music and Cultural Labour in Dharwad", Sangeet Natak XLIII:2 (2009), 35–44.
- "Teaching Gender Studies as Cultural Studies", Inter-Asia Cultural Studies 9:3 (January 2008), 469 – 477.
- "Feminism and Cultural Studies in Asia", Interventions 9:2 (2007), 209–18.

=== Awards ===
- 2021 American Literary Translators’ Association Prize for Prose Fiction Translation, for No Presents Please (Jayant Kaikini)
- 2019 DSC Prize for South Asian Literature 2018, jointly awarded with Jayant Kaikini, for No Presents Please
- 1995 Karnataka Sahitya Akademi Award for Best Translation of 1994
- 1993 Central Sahitya Akademi Award for Best Translation of the year

=== Fellowships ===
2018	Humanities and Social Sciences Prestigious Fellowship, Research Grants Council, Hong Kong
2016	Senior Visiting Research Fellow, Asia Research Institute, NUS Singapore
2013	Lichtstern Distinguished Visiting Professor, Department of Anthropology, University of Chicago
2013	Distinguished Fellow at the Centre for Internet and Society; Advisor to the Access to Knowledge Team working on the Indian Wikipedia
2011	Fellow, Institut d’etudes avancees [Institute of Advanced Studies/Research] de Nantes, France
2007	Fellow, Wissenschaftskolleg zu Berlin [Institute of Advanced Studies], Germany
2005	Honorary Visiting Professor, Centre for Women’s Studies, Jawaharlal Nehru University
1997-99	Sephis (Netherlands) Postdoctoral Fellowship
1996	Sawyer Fellow, International Institute, University of Michigan
1996	Rockefeller Fellow, Program in Globalization and the Media, Chicago Humanities Institute, University of Chicago
1992-94	Homi Bhabha National Fellowship

== See also ==
- Susie Tharu
- Subaltern Studies
- Inter-Asia Cultural Studies
