= Azhagana Naatkal =

2001 film by Sundar C

- Poster
- Directed by: Sundar C
- Written by: Boopathy Pandian (dialogues)
- Screenplay by: Sundar C
- Story by: Priyadarshan; Cheriyan Kalpakavadi (uncredited)
- Produced by: S. T. Selvan
- Starring: Karthik; Rambha; Mumtaj
- Cinematography: Prasad Murella
- Edited by: P. Sai Suresh
- Music by: Deva
- Production company: Gowthami Arts
- Release date: 7 December 2001
- Running time: 145 minutes
- Country: India
- Language: Tamil

Azhagana Naatkal (transl. Beautiful days) is a 2001 Indian Tamil-language comedy film directed by Sundar C, is a remake of the Malayalam film Minnaram (1994) which was based on the 1972 Malayalam movie Brahmachari, which in turn was a remake of 1967 Tamil film Penne Nee Vaazhga. The film stars Karthik and Rambha and became the third collaboration of the pair with Sundar.C, after the successes of Ullathai Allitha (1996) and Unakkaga Ellam Unakkaga (1999). The film also featured Mumtaj, Goundamani and Senthil in pivotal roles and featured music composed by Deva. The film was released on 7 December 2001.

== Plot ==
Indu and Chandru fall in love. Indu does the disappearing act and Chandru gets engaged to Rekha. Indu re-appears after three years with a little girl, who she claims is Chandru's daughter. Chandru vehemently denies it and finding Indu's presence an embarrassment tries to ferret out the truth. After many scenes of forced comedy, it is revealed that the girl is the illegitimate daughter of Chandru's much-married brother, who had seduced Indu's sister. After his brother's futile attempt to play the villain, Chandru latches on to Indu fast enough with no apology to Rekha. But it is not really Chandru's fault. For Rekha had done the disappearing act from the scene early enough without any explanation either.

== Cast ==
- Karthik as Chandru
- Rambha as Indu
- Mumtaj as Rekha
- Goundamani as Ranjith
- Manivannan as Rajasekhar
- Senthil as Mahali
- Rajeev as Guna
- Delhi Ganesh as Somasundaram
- Ponnambalam as Somasundaram's nephew
- Thalapathy Dinesh as Fighter
- Madhan Bob as Doctor
- Sabitha Anand as Guna's wife
- Jyothi Meena as Asha
- Chitra Lakshmanan
- Anu Mohan
- Vengal Rao
- Muthukaalai
- Pandiarajan as Michael (Guest appearance)

== Production ==
Simran had originally signed on to play the lead role in the film, before she was replaced by Rambha. This is a Tamil remake of 1994 Malayalam film Minnaram. Two songs were shot at Ooty.

== Soundtrack ==
The music was composed by Deva. The song "Adi Devathaiye" was based on "Emi Sodara" from Tholi Prema (1998).

Song	Singers	Lyrics
"Adi Devathaiye"	Tippu, "Mahanadhi" Shobana	Pa. Vijay
"Chik Chik Chinnakiliye" I	Sujatha, S. P. B. Charan	Pa. Vijay
"Chik Chik Chinnakiliye" II	Hariharan, Shaisan	Pa. Vijay
"Ishaa Ishaa"	Mano, Anuradha Sriram	Pa. Vijay
"Kadhal Ok"	Shankar Mahadevan, Sujatha	Kalaikumar
"Udugaya Udugaya"	Malgudi Subha	Pa. Vijay

== Reception ==
Malini Mannath of Chennai Online wrote, "No serious thought seems to have gone into the scripting. The performances are lacklustre". Visual Dasan of Kalki wrote Sundar C. reused plots and scenes from his own films and appreciated Goundamani's humour and called Delhi Ganesh's acting as the only relief.
