= Nirnayam (1995 film) =

1995 Indian film by Sangeeth Sivan

- Poster
- Directed by: Sangeeth Sivan
- Written by: Cheriyan Kalpakavadi
- Produced by: Suresh Balaje
- Starring: Mohanlal; Heera Rajagopal; Nedumudi Venu; Lalu Alex; Sharat Saxena
- Cinematography: Santosh Sivan
- Edited by: A. Sreekar Prasad
- Music by: R. Anandh
- Production company: Sithara Combines
- Distributed by: Pranamam Pictures
- Release date: 26 January 1995
- Running time: 167 minutes
- Country: India
- Language: Malayalam

Nirnayam (transl. Diagnosis) is a 1995 Indian Malayalam-language action thriller film directed by Sangeeth Sivan, produced by Suresh Balaje, and written by Cheriyan Kalpakavadi. The film stars Mohanlal and Heera Rajagopal. The plot follows a renowned surgeon who has been falsely accused for his wife's murder escapes from the custody to discover the truth behind the incident and the actual perpetrators. The film's music was composed by R. Anandh. The plot is based on the American film The Fugitive, which itself is based on the 1963 TV series of the same name, both inspired from the actual case of Sam Sheppard.

== Plot ==
A doctor working in a private hospital asks his henchmen to kill a cyclist for unknown reason Dr Roy is a surgeon practicing in a private hospital. He is known for his impeccable skill and short temper. He often gets into problems with the management on account of the hefty medical bills being charged and the absence of action against medical negligence. One night after returning from the club with a friend, drunk, he hits a car and the woman inside yells at him. The woman is later revealed to be Dr Annie who has just returned from the US after completing her studies and will soon take over the hospital as MD. Her uncle who presently looks after it, posts her under Dr Roy for training. Both Dr Roy and Dr Annie are surprised to meet each other at work. Annie dislikes Roy and sees him as arrogant and disrespectful to colleagues. Dr Menon a common friend is supportive of Roy's arguments with the management. Dr Marcos is another doctor in the same hospital who dislikes roy for being a better surgeon than him, He is the doctor shown in the staring of the film . A child called Parvathi is brought to the hospital critically and improves under Dr Roy's care. He develops a special bond with her and decides to adopt her, which he discusses with Father Thayyil of the church he grew up as an orphan. One day parvathis state becomes critical and is taken for emergency surgery. Dr Marcos shuts down the power supply causing difficulties. But the surgery is successful due to annies quick thinking leading annie and roy to bond. Marcos is called out by Roy which creates hatred. Father Thayyil is also admitted for a minor surgery, done by Dr Marcos in the same hospital and recovers well. Meanwhile, Annie and Roy get into a relationship and decide to get married. Roy goes to annies house to ask for her hand in marriage but her uncle denies the proposal and insults him for being an orphan. Annie seeks her mothers blessings and leaves her home. They get married and live happily.

Roy leaves to bombay for a conference while Father Thayyil comes to annie complaining of back pain. On further investigation Annie finds out that father is missing a kidney. She discusses the matter with Dr Marcos who operated him and he dismisses her off saying its a congenital anomaly. But Annie remains suspicious and collects Fr Thayyils old medical records. On further investigation she is shocked to find out that many of Dr Marcos's patients are missing organs after minor surgeries. She waits for roy's return to inform him of these crimes. On the night of his return Marcos's apprentice breaks into their home to erase evidence against Dr Marcos. Annie encounters the burglar and he hits her. She manages to call the police but cannot convey anything clearly. Roy arrives just in time and sees the burglar. He also understands that the man has a prosthetic arm during their encounter. Annie dies in Roy's arms and the man escapes.

All evidences are against Roy, including the phone call, and fingerprints. Annie's uncle also mentions that annie had transferred all her properties including the hospital right before she died arousing suspicion that roy might have killed her for her money. A nurse gives false testimony that Dr Roy promised to marry her after divorcing Annie. Roy is convicted for the murder is sentenced to life imprisonment. On the way to the subjail some fellow inmates attempt to escape causing the police driver to get shot in the process and the van to fall off a cliff. A police officer is injured and Roy's handcuffs are removed for him to help the injured officer. Roy escapes after saving the officers life. Father Thayyil is seen as a threat and is killed off by Marcos's henchman. A nurse who appears as a false witness in the Annie murder case against Roy is also killed by the unknown henchmen. Roy with the help of his friend Iyer tries to get details about patients with prosthetic arms to find the killer. He disguises himself as a ward attender and enters the hospital to collect the necessary medical records. A police officer khan is handed over the case and is on Roy's trail. While trying to gather evidence several children are brought into the hospital after a school bus accident. The duty doctor asks roy to move a child for observation, but roy takes him directly to the OT against orders. The doctor confronts him and he explains to her that the boy had a broken rib and internal bleeding and needed immediate surgery. She realises he was not a wardboy after all and reports the incident to Officer Khan, along with his ID card she had found.

Roy finally narrows his suspects down to a person named Ifthi and reaches his home to investigate. He sees Dr Marcos there trying to steal the evidence Annie had managed to gather before she died. Roy follows him and the duo engage in a fight when it is revealed that Dr Menon is actually the one behind Annie's murders as well the organ trafficking. Dr Menon kills Dr Marcos and tries to frame Roy for yet another murder. Roy manages to over power Menon and finds where Ifthi is. Roy traces down Ifthi and tries to kill him. But he is stopped just in time by Officer Khan and his friend Iyer. Khan tells him that everyone knows he is innocent from Dr Marcos's dying statement. Khan also reminds him that a doctor's hands are for saving lives and not taking them. He also tells him about how Parukutty has nobody left except him and is anticipating his return. Roy decides to surrender. Ifthi however tries to kill Roy once more and, Roy pushes him onto an electric transmitter thus electrocuting and killing him. Dr Menon is arrested for his crimes and Khan sets Dr Roy free stating that his hands are not meant for handcuffs but for saving thousands of lives.

== Cast ==
- Mohanlal as Dr. Roy Mathews
- Heera Rajagopal as Dr. Annie
- Lalu Alex as DIG M. Javed Khan IPS
- Nedumudi Venu as Fr. Thayyil
- Jagadish as Dr. V. D. Iyer
- M. G. Soman as Dr. David Kurishinkal
- Sharat Saxena as Ifti Khan, the killer
- Ratheesh as Dr. Marcose
- Devan as Dr. Menon
- Sudheer as Adv. Rajendran
- Kuthiravattom Pappu as Kunjachan, Dr. Roy's Servant
- Sukumari as Annie's Mother
- Ragini as Dr. Subbu Ammal
- Seetha as Dr. Parvathi
- Geetha Vijayan as Dr. Anusree
- Thampi Kannanthanam as Ganeshan, Police officer
- Augustine as Kunjoottan, Police officer
- Nandu as Sajan, Police officer
- Sadiq as Anil, Police officer
- Ajith Kollam as Peethambaran, the fugitive prisoner
- Maria as Devika Rani, Nurse
- Baby Shamili as Parukkutty

== Soundtrack ==
The film score and soundtrack of the film were composed by R. Anandh.

1. "Malar Masam" - M. G. Sreekumar - 4:59
2. "Puliyanga Kolam" - M.G. Sreekumar - 4:31
3. "En Mizhikkullil" (Only in Audio) - K. S. Chithra - 5:30
4. "En Mizhikkullil" (Only in Audio) - M.G. Sreekumar - 5:30

== Reception ==
The Indian Express praised the film writing: "The Sivan brothers’ team of director and cameraman combine to make a technically efficient thriller taking its cue from the film version of the television series The Fugitive."

== See also ==
- Criminal (1994 film), another Indian remake of The Fugitive
