= Sarvakalashala =

1987 film by Venu Nagavally

- Promotional poster
- Directed by: Venu Nagavally
- Screenplay by: Venu Nagavally
- Story by: Cheriyan Kalpakavadi
- Produced by: Anand
- Starring: Mohanlal; Jagathy Sreekumar; Sukumaran; Sreenath; Sandhya
- Narrated by: Venu Nagavally
- Cinematography: Vipin Mohan
- Edited by: K. P. Hariharaputhran
- Music by: M. G. Radhakrishnan
- Production company: Anand Movie Arts
- Distributed by: Tharangini Films Release
- Release date: 21 April 1987
- Running time: 158 minutes
- Country: India
- Language: Malayalam

Sarvakalasala (transl. University) is a 1987 Indian Malayalam-language romantic comedy film written and directed by Venu Nagavally from a story by Cheriyan Kalpakavadi. The film stars Mohanlal, Jagathy Sreekumar, Sukumaran, Adoor Bhasi, and Seema. The music for the film was composed by M. G. Radhakrishnan.

== Plot ==
It tells the story of an orphan college student Lal, who is taking his 3rd master's degree from a college and continues as a student in the same college to avoid being lonely. He lives in a home nearby college and lives from the leftover money obtained legally when he was a child. He is an affable person to all in the college. There are people who are teachers now, who were his classmates. His word as elder brother is taken as a final statement among students. Chakkara and his cohorts are the all-rounders team in college activities.

Jeevan is an orphanage friend of Lal's whom he meets among the new batch of students. Lal takes Jeevan and his sister Jyothimol as his family. Siddhan is a bohemian poet who is an alcoholic and friend of Lal who lives with him. Principal Achen, Charachira Achan and Kuttanad Achen hold the main roles in the college. One day Siddhan leaves Lal and goes for journeying, later news is received he was murdered. Jeevan, who is in a mentally weakened state asks Lal to admit him to a psychiatric hospital and look after his sister for a while.

Meanwhile, Lal gets reacquainted with his old college flame Gayathri, who has now joined as an English teacher at the College. The College Annual Arts festival nears and everyone is readying for the function. Lal, for the mental well-being of Jyothimol promotes her interest in dancing for the Annual Arts festival. After the dance, Lal packs her bag and waits outside. Suddenly, the electricity goes off and someone sexually assaults Jyothimol, she cries out. The first to come at scene is Lal and everyone suspects Lal.

The management charges a case against Lal. Lal is arrested by the police. Before presenting him to the Police, the real culprit is found by the students. The management staff along with the majority of the students come for the release of Lal. When Lal sees Jyothimol and Jeevan, he becomes relieved and they hug each other. Principal Achen speaks of the goodness inside a student who comes to college is like "standing under the golden canopy of thine evening sky and they lift their eager eyes to knowledge and values. Goodness always wins."

== Cast ==
- Mohanlal as Lal
- Sandhya Rani as Gayathri
- Nedumudi Venu as Siddhan Aashan
- Adoor Bhasi as College Principal
- Jagathi Sreekumar as Fr. Kuttanad
- Sankaradi as Charachira Achan
- Sukumaran as Jayadevan/Kurup
- Seema as Sharadamani
- Sreenath as Jeevan
- Lizy as Jyothimol
- K. B. Ganesh Kumar as Panchara
- Manian Pillai Raju as Chakkara
- Jalaja as Sister Alphonsa
- Sukumari as Leelama
- Innocent Vincent as Innachan
- Nandu as Jose Abraham
- T. P. Madhavan as Psychiatrist
- Jagadeesh as Najeeb

== Soundtrack ==
The music was composed by M. G. Radhakrishnan and the lyrics were written by Kavalam Narayana Panicker. It was distributed by Tharangini Records.

Sarvakalashala (Original Motion Picture Soundtrack)
No.	Title	Singer(s)	Length
1.	"Athintho Theyyanthaaro"	M. G. Sreekumar	3:35
2.	"Athiru Kaakkum"	Nedumudi Venu	1:41
3.	"Panineerppoovithalil"	K. J. Yesudas, K. S. Chithra	4:37
4.	"Porunnirikkum Choodil"	Latha Raju, Lathika	3:57
