= Kathi (film) =

- Directed by: V. P. Mohammed
- Starring: M. G. Soman; Venu Nagavally; Seema
- Music by: M. B. Sreenivasan
- Production company: Navadhara Films
- Distributed by: Navadhara Films
- Release date: 6 May 1983
- Country: India
- Language: Malayalam

Kathi (transl. Knife) is a 1983 Indian Malayalam-language film directed by V. P. Mohammed. The film stars M. G. Soman, Seema, Venu Nagavally, Menaka and Jalaja in the lead roles. It features a musical score by M. B. Sreenivasan.

== Cast ==
- M. G. Soman
- Seema
- Venu Nagavally
- Menaka (actress)
- Jalaja

== Soundtrack ==
The music was composed by M. B. Sreenivasan, with the lyrics written by O. N. V. Kurup.

No.	Song	Singers	Lyrics	Length (m:ss)
1	"Bodhivriksha Dalangal"	K. J. Yesudas	O. N. V. Kurup	
2	"Paathiraakkaattil"	S. Janaki, Chorus	O. N. V. Kurup	
3	"Ponnaralippoo"	V. T. Murali	O. N. V. Kurup	
