= Meenamasathile Sooryan =

- Poster
- Directed by: Lenin Rajendran
- Screenplay by: Lenin Rajendran
- Produced by: C. G. Bhaskaran
- Starring: Shobana; Venu Nagavally; Murali; Vijay Menon; Kakka Ravi
- Cinematography: Shaji N. Karun
- Edited by: Ravi
- Music by: M. B. Sreenivasan
- Production company: Sauhruda Chithra
- Distributed by: Sauhruda Chithra
- Release date: 28 May 1986
- Running time: 117 minutes
- Country: India
- Language: Malayalam

Meenamasathile Sooryan (lit. 'Midsummer Sun') is a 1986 Indian Malayalam language film, written and directed by Lenin Rajendran and produced by C. G. Bhaskaran. It is based on the Kannada novel Chirasmarane (1955) by Niranjana. The film stars Venu Nagavally, Murali, Vijay Menon, Kakka Ravi, and Shobana in the lead roles. The film has musical score by M. B. Sreenivasan.

== Plot ==
The movie is based on the famous 1941 Kayyur Revolt in Kasargod district against the landlords and British Police. Four Communist Party members - Madathil Appu, Abubacker, Chirukandan, and Kunjambu Nair - oppose this. They are sentenced to hang because a constable was accidentally killed during the revolt.

== Cast ==
- Venu Nagavally as Madathil Appu
- Murali as Abubakar
- Vijay Menon as Chirukandan (voice dubbed by Professor Aliyar)
- Kakka Ravi as Kunjambu Nair (voice dubbed by Narendra Prasad)
- Shobana as Revathy
- Sukumari as Abubakar's mother
- Innocent as Adikari
- KPAC Lalitha as Chirukandan's mother
- Nedumudi Venu as Pokkayi
- Vinayan as Madhavan
- Bharath Gopi as E. K. Nayanar Mashu
- Prasannan
- Krishnankutty Nair as Police officer
- Achankunju as Police officer
- Balan K. Nair as Police officer
- KPAC Sunny as Jail warden
- Kannur Sreelatha as Kalyani
- Karamana Janardanan Nair as Janmi
- Ragini as Jaanu/Appu's wife
- Soorya
- Thrissur Elsy

== Production ==
Meenamasathile Sooryan was adapted from the Niranjana novel Chirasmarane (1955).

== Soundtrack ==
The music was composed by M. B. Sreenivasan and the lyrics were written by Ezhacheri Ramachandran and O. N. V. Kurup.

No.	Song	Singers	Lyrics	Length (m:ss)
1	"Adaykkaakkuruvikal"	S. Janaki	Ezhacheri Ramachandran	
2	"Elelam Kilimakale"	K. J. Yesudas	Ezhacheri Ramachandran	
3	"Iruttinethire"		Ezhacheri Ramachandran	
4	"Ithanu Kayyoor"		O. N. V. Kurup	
5	"Maarikkaar Meyunna"	K. J. Yesudas, Vani Jairam	Ezhacheri Ramachandran	
6	"Sathyame"	Chorus	Ezhacheri Ramachandran	
