= Puthumukhangal =

- Theatrical poster
- Directed by: Don Alex; Biju Majeed
- Written by: Pradeep Kumar Kadavanthra
- Produced by: P. A. Salavudeen
- Starring: Ameer; Amal; Sandeep Menon; Suraj Venjaramoodu
- Music by: Shyam Dharman; Rajesh Krishna
- Release date: 31 December 2010
- Running time: 140 minutes
- Country: India
- Language: Malayalam

Puthumukhangal is a 2010 Indian Malayalam-language film directed by debutants Don Alex and Biju Majeed. The film features newcomers in the lead roles.

== Cast ==
- Ameer Niyas as Babloo
- Amal as Amal
- Sandeep Menon as Eric John
- Anand as Kishore
- Zinsil Zainudeen as Pattalapuzhu
- Anoop George as Chitrabhanu
- Jijoy as Voice For Chitrabhanu
- Salim Kumar as Villu Velayudhan
- Lalu Alex as Prof. Paul Henry
- Suraj Venjaramoodu as Dr. Govardhan
- Harisree Ashokan as Member Mani
- Shivaji Guruvayoor as Partham Pillai
- Biju Kuttan
- Jaffar Idukki as Sulaiman
- Anchal Sabharwal as Nikitha Charan
- Oviya as Varsha
- Sasi Kalinga as Vithu Varkky
- Ranjitha as Prof. Teresa Jacob
- Geetha Vijayan as Amithakumari
- Mahesh as John
- Sonia as Thankamani
- Unni Maya as Asha
- Rajalakshmi as Subhadra
- Anjana Appukuttan as Mini
- Nima as Sheena Mol
- Kavithashree as Pankajakshi
- Deepika Mohan as Partham Pillai's wife

== Critical reception ==
The film got a limited release on 31 December 2010 and a wider release in March 2011 in Kerala. Nowrunning.com gave the film 1/5 stars stating that "The moment when promising ventures get lauded, and those unpromising get drowned in a flood down the drain. Sad then, that Puthumukhangal that wastes opportunity and talent would flow down into oblivion in no time."
