= Ishtamanu Pakshe =

- Directed by: Balachandra Menon
- Written by: Balachandra Menon
- Screenplay by: Balachandra Menon
- Produced by: E. J. Peter
- Starring: Sukumaran; Venu Nagavally; Ratheesh; Jagathy Sreekumar
- Cinematography: Vipin Das
- Edited by: G. Venkittaraman
- Music by: G. Devarajan
- Production company: St. Martin Films
- Distributed by: St. Martin Films
- Release date: 6 November 1980
- Country: India
- Language: Malayalam

Ishtamanu Pakshe is a 1980 Indian Malayalam-language film directed by Balachandra Menon and produced by E. J. Peter. The film stars Sukumaran, Venu Nagavally, Ratheesh and Jagathy Sreekumar in the lead roles. The film has musical score by G. Devarajan.

== Cast ==
- Sukumaran
- Venu Nagavally
- Ratheesh
- Jagathy Sreekumar
- K. P. Ummer
- Sankaradi
- T. P. Madhavan
- T. R. Omana
- Ambika
- Santhakumari

== Soundtrack ==
The music was composed by G. Devarajan.

No.	Song	Singers	Lyrics	Length (m:ss)
1	"Shishiraraathri Uruvidunnu"	P. Madhuri	Alappuzha Rajasekharan Nair	
2	"Vilikkaathirunnaalum"	K. J. Yesudas, P. Jayachandran, P. Madhuri	Alappuzha Rajasekharan Nair	
