= Aayirappara =

- Directed by: Venu Nagavalli
- Written by: Nagavalli R. S. Kurup
- Produced by: Sreekanth; Ashok
- Starring: Mammootty; Madhu; Urvashi
- Cinematography: K. P. Nambiathiri
- Edited by: N. Gopalakrishnan
- Music by: Songs: Raveendran Lyrics: Kavalam Narayana Panicker
- Distributed by: Mak Release
- Release date: 4 February 1993
- Country: India
- Language: Malayalam

Aayirappara is a 1993 Malayalam film directed by Venu Nagavalli, starring Mammootty, Urvashi and Madhu in the lead roles. The movie was produced by Sreekanth and Ashok under the banner of Gauridarshana and it has been distributed by Mak Release.

== Cast ==
- Mammootty as Shauri
- Urvashi as Parvathy
- Madhu as Paappi, Shauri's father
- Narendra Prasad as Padhmanabha Kaimal, Parvathy's father
- Vijayakumar as Chettiar
- Jagathy Sreekumar
- Sreenivasan as Vasu
- V. K. Sreeraman as Basheer
- Kuthiravattam Pappu as Urumees
- Jagannathan as Chandrabhanu
- Sankaradi as Priest
- Prem Kumar as Yasodharan
- Rajan P. Dev as Govinda Menon
- K. P. A. C. Sunny as Chackochen
- Shivaji
- Rizabawa as Bhanuvikrama Kaimal
- N. L. Balakrishnan as Chettiar's goon
- Poojappura Ravi as Kuruppu
- Nandu
- Sukumari as Mary, Shauri's mother
- Kuttyedathi Vilasini
- Jezil Ashraf as Shauri (childhood)

== Soundtrack ==
The songs in this movie were written by Kavalam Narayana Panicker and composed by Raveendran. The songs have been distributed by C. C. Audios. The background score also was by Raveendran.

No.	Song	Singers	Length (m:ss)
1	"Nattupacha Kilipenne"	K. J. Yesudas	
2	"Ellarkkum Kittiya Sammanam"	M. G. Sreekumar, B. Arundhathi	
3	"Yathrayay"	K. J. Yesudas, B. Arundhathi	
4	"Athazhi"	K. J. Yesudas	

== Awards ==
- 1993 Kerala State Film Award for Best Actor - Mammootty
