= Ulladakkam =

- Directed by: Kamal
- Screenplay by: P. Balachandran
- Story by: Cheriyan Kalpakavadi
- Produced by: Suresh Balaje
- Starring: Mohanlal; Shobana; Amala Akkineni; Murali
- Cinematography: Saloo George
- Edited by: K. Rajagopal
- Music by: Ouseppachan
- Production company: Sithara Combines
- Distributed by: Bhavachithra; Murali Films Release
- Release date: 1991
- Country: India
- Language: Malayalam

Ulladakkam (transl. Content) is a 1991 Indian Malayalam-language psychological thriller film directed by Kamal and written by P. Balachandran from a story by Cheriyan Kalpakavadi. It stars Mohanlal, Shobana and Amala Akkineni. The film, produced by Suresh Balaje features a soundtrack composed by Ouseppachan. The plot follows a psychiatrist, Dr. Sunny (Mohanlal) and one of his patients, Reshma (Amala), who gets obsessed with him romantically, but Sunny is already engaged with Annie (Shobana). The film explores the phenomenon of transference.

Upon release, it received critical acclaim. Ulladakkam is now regarded as one of the best films of Kamal. The film won three Kerala State Film Awards, including Best Actor (Mohanlal), Best Director (Kamal), and Best Dubbing Artist (Bhagyalakshmi). Amala won the Filmfare Award for Best Actress – Malayalam.

== Plot ==
Dr Sunny is a kind hearted and compassionate psychiatrist who is engaged to his girlfriend Annie. One day a girl named Reshma is admitted to Sunny's hospital by her brother Roy, who is a close friend of Sunny. Sunny is led to Reshma's room, where he catches a glimpse of the trashed-out room, with Reshma crouching in a corner, in a highly agitated state. She is later brought to the hospital, and we see her less agitated, but with a vacant expression, suggestive of a dissociation from her surroundings. While she is managed with tranquilizers, Sunny probes into her background. He discovers a few clues in her diary. There are traits of heightened emotionality in her writings – letters to her mother, who died when she was ten. Her brother adds that she had a transient psychotic episode when their mother had died.

Sunny tries to explore the trigger for the current psychotic episode. From the Rorschach tests, he gathers that there is a connection with the sea, for Reshma becomes highly agitated when she sees a Rorschach card depicting the sea. With further clues, he associates it to the mysterious disappearance of her boyfriend, Arun. He subjects Reshma to hypnosis and elicits the whole story of how a mafia group closes in on the duo at the beach, and kill Arun, whose body is washed into the sea, while Reshma watches helplessly. Reshma is made to narrate the event and she is also given a guarded exposure to the sea, which cures her of her sea phobia. And thus, we see Reshma gradually recovering from her dissociation. She focusses on her surroundings and develops a special bonding with one of the inmates (Sukumari), in whom she sees a mother figure.

Her recovery is complicated by her fundamental emotional insecurity and dependent personality. When Sukumari is discharged from the asylum, Reshma's unconscious seeks a strong replacement for Arun and she clings to Sunny. Sunny's personality and his degree of involvement with Reshma makes it easy for her to transfer her emotions for Arun towards Sunny. With an unconscious that refuses to come to terms with Arun's permanent loss, and that refuses to acknowledge the loss of a relationship in which Reshma's involvement was overt (with dependence), Reshma's unconscious transfers the relationship to the receptive and reciprocative Sunny (the phenomenon of transference, described by Freud). And thus, her dependence shifts to Sunny. The movie takes a final turn when at Sunny's wedding party, Reshma finds herself disturbed by the sound of the drums and the sight of the drummer (Arun was a drummer). In a fit of psychosis, Reshma murders Sunny's wife, Annie.

The majority of the movie is a flashback to 7 years ago. Sunny receives a call from Roy stating Reshma is now normal. She spent the last 7 years healing from the events that transpired. Roy brings Reshma to Sunny and asks his forgiveness. Roy tells Sunny that Reshma will be serving others under Mother Teresa for the rest her life for penance. Sunny forgives Reshma by telling her it was not her but her mental condition that was to blame, and they embrace.

== Cast ==
- Mohanlal as Dr. Sunny, a kind hearted and compassionate psychiatrist
- Shobana as Annie, Sunny's fiancé (Voiced by Anandavally)
- Amala Akkineni as Reshma, Sunny's patient (Voiced by Bhagyalakshmi and Sreeja Ravi)
- Murali as Roy, Reshma’s brother
- Ashokan as Kishore, a fellow patient
- M. G. Soman as Mathachan
- Sukumari as Mental Patient
- Innocent as Kunjachan
- Kaviyoor Ponnamma as Sunny's Mother
- Philomina as Hospital Attendant
- Jagathy Sreekumar as Burning Desire - Mental Patient
- Zainuddin as Chakrapani
- Krishnan Kutty Nair as Mental Patient
- Mavelikkara Ponnamma as Mental Patient
- Kunchan as Freddy
- T. P. Madhavan as Doctor
- Zeenath as Reena
- Dileep as a person in the party (uncredited)

== Soundtrack ==
Ulladakkam

Soundtrack album by Ouseppachan
- Released: 14 July 1991
- Recorded: 1991
- Genre: Popular music
- Length: 17:35
- Language: Malayalam
- Label: Ranjini Cassettes
- Producer: Suresh Balaje

Ouseppachan chronology
| Thoovalsparsham (1990) | Ulladakkam (1991) | Aavanikunnile Kinnaripookkal (1991) |

Ouseppachan composed the soundtrack for the film, to which the lyrics were written by Kaithapram Damodaran Namboothiri. The original soundtrack consisting four tracks was released by Ranjini Cassettes on 14 July 1991.

Ulladakkam (Original Motion Picture Soundtrack)
| No. | Title | Artist(s) | Length |
|---|---|---|---|
| 1. | "Andhiveyil" | K. J. Yesudas, Sujatha Mohan | 04:00 |
| 2. | "Maayatha Marivil" | M. G. Sreekumar, K. S. Chithra | 04:49 |
| 3. | "Paathiramazha (Female vocals)" | K. S. Chithra | 04:24 |
| 4. | "Paathiramazha" | K. J. Yesudas | 04:22 |
| Total length: | | | 17:35 |

== Reception ==
Upon release, it received critical acclaim. Ulladakkam is now regarded as one of the best films of Kamal.

== Awards ==
Kerala State Film Awards

- Best Actor - Mohanlal
- Best Director - Kamal
- Best Dubbing Artist - Bhagyalakshmi

Filmfare Awards South

- Best Actress (Malayalam) - Amala

Kerala Film Critics Association Awards

- Best Actor - Mohanlal
