= Cheriyan Kalpakavadi =

Indian screenwriter

Cheriyan Kalpakavadi is an Indian story, screenplay and dialogue writer known for his association with director Venu Nagavally and actor Mohanlal. The partnership has produced some Malayalam films in the 1990s.

== Filmography ==
Year	Title	Notes
1987	Sarvakalashala	Direction : Venu Nagavally; Starring : Mohanlal, Sandhya
1990	Lal Salam	Direction : Venu Nagavally
1991	Ulladakkam	Direction : Kamal; Starring : Mohanlal, Shobhana, Amala
1992	Aardram	Direction : Suresh Unnithan
1994	Pakshe	Direction : Mohan; Starring : Mohanlal, Shobhana
1994	Minnaram	Direction : Priyadarshan
1995	Nirnayam	Direction : Sangeeth Sivan; Starring : Mohanlal, Baby Shamili, Heera Rajagopal
1995	Sakshyam	Direction : Mohan; Starring : Suresh Gopi, Murali, Annie, Gouthami
1998	Rakthasakshikal Sindabad	Direction : Venu Nagavally; Starring : Mohanlal
2005	The Campus	Direction : Mohan
2009	Banaras	Direction: Nemom Pushparaj
2009	Bharya Swantham Suhruthu	Director: Venu Nagavally
2009	Vairam: Fight for Justice	Director: M. A. Nishad
2012	Njanum Ente Familiyum	Direction : KK Rajeev; Starring : Jayaram, Mamtha Mohandas
2019	Thelivu	Direction : M. A. Nishad
