= Velichamillatha Veedhi =

- Directed by: Jose Kallen
- Written by: Thomas Vadakkel
- Screenplay by: Thomas Vadakkel
- Produced by: Aravind K. Varma
- Starring: Sukumari; Venu Nagavally; Menaka; Indira
- Cinematography: E. N. C. Nair
- Edited by: A. Sukumaran
- Music by: K. P. Udayabhanu
- Production company: Salkkala Films
- Distributed by: Salkkala Films
- Release date: 16 March 1984
- Country: India
- Language: Malayalam

Velichamillatha Veedhi is a 1984 Indian Malayalam film, directed by Jose Kallen and produced by Aravind K. Varma. The film stars Sukumari, Venu Nagavally, Menaka and Indira in the lead roles. The film has musical score by K. P. Udayabhanu.

== Cast ==
- Sukumari
- Venu Nagavally
- Menaka
- Indira
- Mala Aravindan
- Nellikode Bhaskaran
- Shanavas
- Aravind K. Varma

== Soundtrack ==
The music was composed by K. P. Udayabhanu and the lyrics were written by Vellanad Narayanan.

No.	Song	Singers	Lyrics	Length (m:ss)
1	"Anjana Mizhikal"	K. J. Yesudas	Vellanad Narayanan	
2	"Mangalyaswapnangale"	S. Janaki	Vellanad Narayanan	
3	"Muthorukki"	Sindhudevi	Vellanad Narayanan	
4	"Ninte Dukham"	K. J. Yesudas	Vellanad Narayanan	
