= Canvas (2010 film) =

- Directed by: Shaji-Rajasekharan
- Produced by: Pramosh
- Starring: Kalabhavan Mani; Kannan; Althara; Jagathy Sreekumar; Boban Alummoodan
- Cinematography: Reji Prasad
- Release date: 21 May 2010
- Country: India
- Language: Malayalam

Canvas is a 2010 Indian Malayalam-language film directed by Shaji-Rajasekharan starring Kalabhavan Mani, Kannan and Altara.

== Plot ==
Manaf Hussain is a painter cum dramatist. Ramu is his assistant. Madhuri is a Bollywood star who has found inspiration in their play and has agreed to be a part of it. The story that Manaf decides to adapt for the stage is that of Yayathi's, the celebrated king of the Lunar dynasty who falls in love with both Devayani and Sharmishta. The movie talks about the relevance of the story and how it could serve as a metaphor for the modern times.

== Cast ==
- Kalabhavan Mani as Manaf Hussain
- Jagathy Sreekumar
- Kannan as Ramu
- Althara
- Salim Kumar
- Boban Alummoodan as Baburaj
- Indrans
- Machan Varghese
- Mala Aravindan
- Meghanathan
- K. P. A. C. Lalitha
- Sajitha Betti
- Kottayam Nazeer as Manmadhan
