= Minnaram =

1994 Indian film by Priyadarshan

- Theatrical release poster
- Directed by: Priyadarshan
- Screenplay by: Priyadarshan
- Story by: Cheriyan Kalpakavadi
- Produced by: R. Mohan
- Starring: Mohanlal; Shobana; Thilakan
- Cinematography: K. V. Anand
- Edited by: N. Gopalakrishnan
- Music by: S. P. Venkatesh
- Production company: Goodknight Films
- Distributed by: Manorajyam Release
- Release date: 16 September 1994
- Running time: 150 minutes
- Country: India
- Language: Malayalam

Minnaram (lit. 'Lighthouse / Beacon') is a 1994 Indian Malayalam-language romantic comedy film written and directed by Priyadarshan from a story by Cheriyan Kalpakavadi. This film was later remade in tamil as Azhagana Naatkal .The film stars Mohanlal, Shobana, and Thilakan, in main lead roles, with Sankaradi, K. P. Ummer, Jagathy Sreekumar, Geetha Vijayan, Venu Nagavally, and Lalu Alex in supporting roles. It was produced by R. Mohan through Goodknight Films. The film was a commercial success at box office.

== Plot ==
Bobby, who was orphaned at an early age, is raised by his uncle, Retd. I.G Matthews, as his son. Everyone adores him, particularly his cousin Baby's pre-teen children. He is engaged to Tina, Chackochan's daughter. Nina, his college sweetheart, unexpectedly appears with an infant who was purportedly fathered by Bobby. He vigorously refutes her accusations and goes to considerable lengths to show that she is mistaken. Bobby is also exposed as a liar when Nina manipulates Matthews into believing her story.

Bobby's family is forced to take on the duty of keeping the new information hidden from Chackochan since they are unable to make an immediate decision. As a result, Nina is introduced to others as a home instructor for Baby's children. Bobby is unable to verify his claims that the child is not the consequence of his previous relationship with Nina. This leads to a series of humorous occurrences involving Unnunni, who becomes anxious about Bobby having an illicit affair with his wife, Daisy. Bobby tells Daisy, who has been his best friend since childhood, about how his relationship with Nina began, evolved, and ended. In the interim, Nina proves to be a skilled tutor and gradually forges close relationships with every member of Bobby's family except for Bobby.

When Chackochan finally learns that Nina has already been married to Bobby, he calls off the ceremony and publicly shames Matthews for being dishonest. Bobby, with nothing to lose, demands Nina to be his wife for real, but Nina flatly refuses. Nina, unable to deal with Bobby's intimidation, breaks down and tells him the truth.

Baby learns the truth from Nina about the child and is informed that Bobby has been telling the truth about everything. During his troubled marriage, Baby had an affair with Nina's sister, who ultimately died during labor, leaving Nina in a precarious position to deliver the child in Baby's care. Baby first declines, fearing that the scandal will destroy his marriage. But Matthews overhears the talk and slaps Baby. He also feels sad for Bobby, who had already suffered plenty.

However, fate has a cruel twist in store for Nina when she faints shortly after rejecting Bobby's proposal to marry her. Bobby and his family are then informed by Nina's brother, Dr. Romy, that she shares the same deadly illness as her sister, polycythemia vera. He worries that she must have accidentally missed one or two doses, resulting in her collapse. He recalls Nina's adamant desire to guarantee that her niece was not orphaned, and her pledge that she would die only in her brother's arms. Along with a group of medical professionals, Bobby's family is fighting against the odds for Nina's health. Nina is relieved to see that her niece has been happily welcomed into her extended family. However, her emotional outburst puts her in critical condition, leaving the family in mental anguish.

Bobby works against the clock to get the radioactive phosphorus medication (Phosphorus-32) in time to prevent his loved one from having an acute relapse, as per the predetermined timeline. Despite his best efforts and everyone's prayers, he is unable to arrive in time to save her. Both Dr. Romy and Bobby are devastated. With the family now silently grieving, the movie concludes with Bobby seemingly by himself as well.

== Cast ==
- Mohanlal as Bobby
- Shobana as Neena, Bobby's girl friend
- Thilakan as Retd. I. G. Matthews, Bobby's father
- Lalu Alex as Dr. Romy, Neena's brother
- Anju as Teena, Chackochan's daughter
- Jagathi Sreekumar as Unnunni
- K. P. Ummer as Chackochan
- Venu Nagavalli as Baby
- Sankaradi as Iyer
- Augustine as Doctor Stephen
- Maniyanpilla Raju as 'Mazhuvan' Manikantan / Lassar
- Kuthiravattam Pappu as Cleetus, Tutor
- T. P. Madhavan as Doctor Peter
- Geetha Vijayan as Jaya
- Subhashini as Daisy
- Reena as Reena
- Bobby Kottarakkara as Michael
- Ravi Menon as Priest Ouseppachan
- Nandu as Philipose
- Antony Perumbavoor as James, a man at badminton court
- Baby Ambili as child artist
- Master Vishnu as child artist
- Master Krishna (Hari Krishna Bharadwaj) as child artist
- Priyadarshan
- Jithesh Krishnankutty as Jithumon
- Aswathi as child artist
- Thara Thomas Moolayil as Maala Mol, Nina's niece
- Neha Dhupia as child artist
- Karthika Prathap as child artist

== Music ==
All lyrics are written by Shibu Chakravarthy and Gireesh Puthenchery; all music is composed by S. P. Venkatesh

No.	Title	Artist(s)	Length
1.	"Chinkarakinnaram"	M. G. Sreekumar, K. S. Chithra
2.	"Darlings of Mine"	Dr. Kalyan, Anupama
3.	"Kunjoonjaal"	M. G. Sreekumar, K. S. Chithra
4.	"Manjakunjikkalulla"	M. G. Sreekumar, Sujatha Mohan
5.	"Nilaave Maayumoo" (Male)	M. G. Sreekumar
6.	"Nilaave Maayumo" (Female)	K. S. Chithra
7.	"Oru Vallam Ponnum"	M. G. Sreekumar, Sujatha Mohan
8.	"Thaliraninjoru"	M. G. Sreekumar, K. S. Chithra

== Remake ==
Minnaram is loosely based on the 1972 Malayalam film Brahmachari starring Premnazir and Sharadha which was a remake of 1967 Tamil movie Penne Nee Vaazhga. It was remade in Tamil as Azhagana Naatkal in 2001. Priyadarshan himself loosely remade the film in Hindi as Hungama 2 (2021). However, a dog explosion comedy sequence from this film had been earlier used by Priyadarshan in another Hindi film Yeh Teraa Ghar Yeh Meraa Ghar (2001).
