= Rakthasakshikal Sindabad =

Rakthasaakshikal Sindabad
- Directed by: Venu Nagavalli
- Written by: Venu Nagavally
- Screenplay by: Venu Nagavally; Cheriyan Kalpakavadi
- Story by: Cheriyan Kalpakavadi
- Produced by: Deepa Ramesh Kumar
- Starring: Mohanlal; Suresh Gopi; Murali; Nedumudi Venu; Sukanya
- Cinematography: P. Sukumar
- Edited by: N. Gopalakrishnan
- Music by: M. G. Radhakrishnan
- Production company: Surya Cine Arts
- Distributed by: Surya Cine Arts; Seven Arts
- Release date: 30 October 1998
- Country: India
- Language: Malayalam

Rakthasaakshikal Sindabad (English: Long live the martyrs) is a 1998 Indian Malayalam-language historical political action thriller movie directed by Venu Nagavalli, featuring Mohanlal, Suresh Gopi and Sukanya in the lead roles. The revolt scenes in the film were directed by Priyadarshan.

The film was released on 30 October 1998 coinciding with the fifty-second anniversary of Punnapra-Valayar.

== Plot ==
A political story set in the pre-independent India when Communism came into the picture.

== Cast ==
- Mohanlal as Siva Subrahmanya Iyer, later Comrade Shivan
- Suresh Gopi as Urmees Tharakan Mappilassery
- Nassar as Divan Sir C. P. Ramaswami Iyer
- Murali as E. Sreedharan
- Sukanya as Sivakami Ammal
- Ranjitha
- Maathu
- Sreejaya Nair as Ammini
- Nedumudi Venu as Iyer's elder brother
- Zainuddin as comrade
- Karamana Janardanan Nair as Raman Thirumulpadu
- Rajan P. Dev as Mappilassery Tharakan
- Mala Aravindan
- Jagannatha Varma as Parthasarathy of Alummoottil
- Sukumari as Subbulaxmi Ammal, Iyer's mother

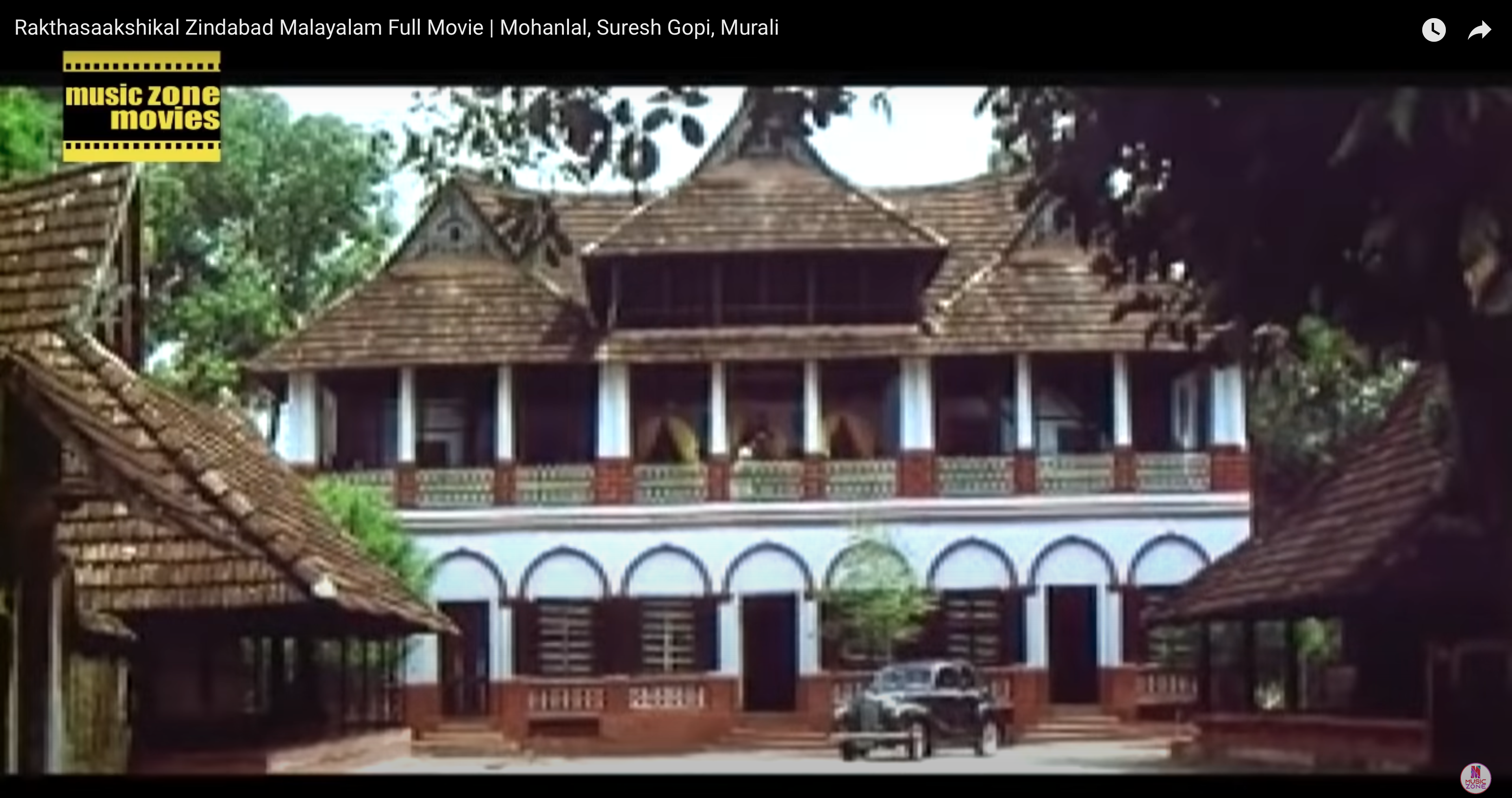
Parthasarthy (Jagannatha Varma) home is the Alummootil meda in the movie. Divan Sir CP is welcomed in to the Alummoottil Meda. The meda in the movie is also the seat of the Brahmana Sabha.

== Production ==
The film is based on the Punnapra-Vayalar agitation and was criticised for not doing justice to the history.

== Soundtrack ==
The film's soundtrack contains 9 songs, all composed by M. G. Radhakrishnan. Lyrics were by P. Bhaskaran, O. N. V. Kurup, Gireesh Puthenchery and Ezhacheri Ramachandran.

#	Title	Lyrics	Singer(s)
1	"Balikudeerangal"	Ezhacheri Ramachandran	K. J. Yesudas
2	"Cheruvallikkaavilinnu" [Bonus Track]	Gireesh Puthenchery	Sudeep Kumar
3	"Kizhakku Pulari"	P. Bhaskaran	M. G. Sreekumar, K. J. Yesudas, Chorus
4	"Nammalu Koyyum"	O. N. V. Kurup	M. G. Sreekumar, K. S. Chitra, Chorus
5	"Panineer Maariyil" [Bonus Track]	Gireesh Puthenchery	Radhika Thilak, Sudeep Kumar
6	"Ponnaaryan Paadam"	Gireesh Puthenchery	K. S. Chitra
7	"Vaikaasihennalo"	Gireesh Puthenchery	M. G. Sreekumar, K. S. Chitra
8	"Vaikaasithennalo" (F)	Gireesh Puthenchery	K. S. Chitra
9	"Vaikaasithennalo" (M)	Gireesh Puthenchery	M. G. Sreekumar
