= Geetha Vijayan =

Indian actress

- Citizenship: Indian
- Occupation: Actress
- Years active: 1990–present
- Parents: Dr. Vijayan (father); Sharadambal Raman (mother)
- Relatives: Revathi (cousin)

Geetha Vijayan is an Indian actress who appears in Malayalam movies, a few Tamil and Hindi movies. She debuted in the 1990 Malayalam comedy-thriller film In Harihar Nagar. She has since acted in more than 150 Malayalam movies and in some Tamil and Hindi films. She has also acted in about 20 Malayalam television serials.

== Early life and education ==
Geetha Vijayan is the eldest daughter of Dr. Vijayan and Sharadambal Raman. She has a younger sister, Divya. Actress Revathi is her cousin. She completed her primary and high school education from Sacred Heart Convent GHSS, Thrissur, and then joined Kalakshetra Foundation, Chennai, where she did her graduation and postgraduation in dancing.

== Filmography ==
=== Malayalam films ===
List of Malayalam film credits
Year	Title	Role	Notes
1990	In Harihar Nagar	Maya	
1991	Nagarathil Samsara Vishayam	Saritha	
1991	Kankettu	Sridevi	
1991	Irikku M.D. Akathundu	Manju	
1991	Ganamela	Lakshmi	
1991	Chanchattam	Mary	
1992	Grihaprevesam	Vanaja	
1992	Aparatha	Sheela	
1992	First Bell	Beena	
1993	Sthreedhanam	Prasanna	
1993	Kabooliwala	Geetha	
1993	City Police	Maya	
1993	Jackpot	Stella	
1993	Vakkeel Vasudev	Shobha	
1993	Sarovaram	Jaya	
1993	Gandharvam	Soniya	
1994	Varanamaalyam	Cicily	
1994	Nandini Oppol	Latha	
1994	Thenmavin Kombath	Chinnu	
1994	Cabinet	Rasiya	
1994	Rajadhani	Kavitha Menon	
1994	Bharya	Sujatha	
1994	Minnaram	Jaya	
1995	Thakshashila	Instructor	
1995	Special Squad	Rekha Cheriyan	
1995	Arabia	Seba	
1995	Nirnayam	Doctor	
1995	Mimics Action 500	Alice	
1995	Achan Kombathu Amma Varampathu	Maya	
1995	Sasinas	Sasinas	
1995	Karma	Rajani	
1995	Sakshyam	Mariamma	
1995	Mannar Mathai Speaking	Meera	
1995	Radholsavam	Seethamma	
1995	Kakkakum Poochakkum Kalyanam	Chandni	
1996	Mayoora Nritham	Herself	
2001	Unnathangalil	Salomi	
2003	Kilichundan Mampazham	Maimuna	
2004	Sethurama Iyer CBI	Mosi	
2004	Vettam	Prostitute	
2004	Natturajavu	Sunnychan's wife	
2006	Anuvaadamillaathe		
2007	Chotta Mumbai	Deepa	
2007	Mission 90 Days	Mary	
2008	Aakasha Gopuram		
2008	Thalappavu	Rosamma	
2009	Utharaswayamvaram	Hema	
2009	Love In Singapore	Preetha's mother	
2009	2 Harihar Nagar	Maya	
2009	Sufi Paranja Katha	Meenakshi	
2009	Evidam Swargamanu	Collector Sandhya Rama IAS	
2009	Kancheepurathe Kalyanam	Kamakshi	
2009	Black Dalia	Hostel Warden	
2009	Shudharil Shudhan	Ramani	
2010	Karayilekku Oru Kadal Dooram	Anoop's mother	
2010	Puthumukhangal	Amithakumari	
2010	Nirakazhcha	Shilpa's friend	
2010	Annarakkannanum Thannalayathu	Padmanabhan Nair's daughter	
2010	Advocate Lakshmanan – Ladies Only	Meenakshi	
2010	Plus Two	Alice	
2010	Holidays	Lekha's mother	
2010	Kandahar	Passenger in Flight	
2010	Thaskara Lahala	Pooja	
2010	Sakudumbam Shyamala	Shekaran's wife	
2010	College Days	Satish's mother	
2010	Chithrakuzhal	Charu's mother	
2011	Kattu Paranja Katha	Devadasi	
2011	Janapriyan	Meera's mother	
2011	Bhakthajanangalude Sradhakku	Dakshayani	
2011	Doubles	Giri's & Gowri's mother	
2011	Race	Nirmala	
2011	Kottarathil Kutty Bhootham	Elikutty	
2012	Red Alert	Unnimol's & Appu's mother	
2012	Kaashh	Ammini	
2012	Ee Thirakkinidayil	Bindhu	
2012	Kunjaliyan	Mallika	
2012	Thappana	Sathi	
2012	Namukku Parkkan	Sindhu	
2012	Vaadhyar	English Medium School Principal	
2012	Chettayees	Mathew's wife	
2013	Dolls	Dilip's sister	
2013	Police Maamam	Meenakshi	
2013	Namboothiri Yuvavu @ 43	Sr. Tessy	
2013	Miss Lekha Tharoor Kaanunnathu	Muthulakshmi	
2014	Villali Veeran		
2014	Parankimala	Rukmini	
2014	My Life Partner	Lekshmi	
2014	Education Loan	Saraswathy	
2014	Kuruthamkettavan	Kathreena	
2014	Mithram	College Principal	
2015	The Reporter	Lisa	
2015	Maayamalika	Kammaran's wife	
2015	Appavum Veenjum	Jithu's lover	
2015	Uthara Chemmeen	Panchami	
2015	Oru New Generation Pani	Menon's assistant	
2015	Kerala Today		
2016	Kadhantharam	Bhanu	
2016	Angane Thanne Nethave Anchettennam Pinnale		
2016	Popcorn	Anjana's mother	
2016	Daffadar	Sujatha	
2017	Tiyaan	Home nurse	
2017	Vilakkumaram	Ananthakrishnan's mother	
2018	Jungle.com	Sona teacher	
2018	Mutalaq	Ramla	
2018	Premanjali	Malini	
2018	Laughing Apartment Near Girinagar	Adv. Bala	
2018	Krishnam	Hostel warden	
2018	Ippozhum Eppozhum Sthuthiyayirikkatte	Aani Antony	
2019	Madhaveeyam	Manasi	
2019	Isakkinte Ithihasam	Annie	
2022	Swami Saranam		
2022	Kalachekon		

=== Hindi films ===
List of Hindi film credits
Year	Title	Role	Notes
1998	Saat Rang Ke Sapne	Mahipal's sister	
2001	Yeh Teraa Ghar Yeh Meraa Ghar	Saraswati's co-worker	
2006	Malamaal Weekly		Uncredited
2010	Khatta Meetha	Gayatri Fatak	

=== Tamil films ===
List of Tamil film credits
Year	Title	Role	Notes
1991	Moondrezhuthil En Moochirukkum	Stella	
2008	Kanchivaram	Venkadam's sister	
2015	Adhar		
2015	Buddhanin Sirippu		
2019	Krishnam		

== Television ==
=== TV series ===
List of television series credits
Year	Title	Channel	Notes
	Pennurimai	DD Malayalam	
	Ladies Hotel	DD Malayalam	
	Malay Serial	HBV	
	Malay Serial	HBV	
1999-2000	Sindoorakuruvi	Surya TV	
2000-2002	Sreeraman Sreedevi	Asianet	
2002-2003	Valsalyam	Surya TV	
2003	Sthree Oru Sandhwanam	Asianet	
2005	MT Kadhakal	Amrita TV	
2006	Stree 2	Asianet	
2007	Sree Ayyappanum Vavarum	Surya TV	
2007	Nombarappoovu	Asianet	
2008	In Jawahar Colony	Amrita TV	
2008	Ettu Sundarikalum Njanum	Surya TV	
	Vadhu	Telefilm	
2014-2015	Kalyani Kalavani	Asianet Plus	Won—Asianet television award for best actress in a humorous role (special jury)
2015	Amrithavarshini	Janam TV	
2017	Maamattikutty	Fowers TV	
2018	Police	ACV	
2019-2020	Thamarathumbi	Surya TV	

=== Reality shows as a judge ===
- Comedy Festival (Mazhavil Manorama)
- Comedy Express (Asianet)
- Idea Star Singer (Asianet)
- Super Dancer Junior (Amrita TV)

=== Reality Shows as Anchor ===
- Golden Couple (Jeevan TV)

=== Game shows as participant ===
- Flowers Oru Kodi
