= Annarakkannanum Thannalayathu =

- DVD Cover image
- Directed by: Prakash
- Produced by: Kalabhavan Mani
- Starring: Kalabhavan Mani; Jayashree; Ansiba Hassan
- Cinematography: Anandakuttan
- Music by: Nikhil Prabha
- Release date: 19 February 2010
- Country: India
- Language: Malayalam

Annarakkannanum Thannalayathu (transl. Everyone chips in what they can) is a 2010 Malayalam-language film directed by Prakash. Kalabhavan Mani, Jayashree and Ansiba Hassan play the lead roles in this film. It is produced by Kalabhavan Mani. Released in February 2010, this was the last film of Santha Devi, who died in November that year.

== Plot ==
Annarakkannanum Thannalayathu tells the story of Changampuzha Pavithran who is a do-gooder who hails from the land of the great poet. Pavithran is bound to be around if a soul finds itself in distress. A bachelor who dreams about meeting his lady love some day, Pavithran's life goes topsy-turvy when an astrologer predicts he will marry a widow who will transform his entire life.

== Cast ==
- Kalabhavan Mani as Changampuzha Pavithran
- Jayashree as Lakshmi
- Ansiba Hassan (credited as Nakshatra)
- Biju Kuttan
- K. P. A. C. Lalitha as Pavithran's mother
- Jagathy Sreekumar as S. Gunasekharan
- Thilakan
- Abu Salim as Eeshwaran Varma
- Indrans
- Janardhanan
- Geetha Vijayan
- Majeed
- Ambika Mohan as Srimathi teacher
- Santha Devi as Valiyathan's mother
- Kulappulli Leela
- Niyaz

== Production ==
In this film Kalabhavan Mani was reported to play a double role; however, the reports were proven false. Tamil actress Jayashree made her Malayalam debut through this film. The film began shooting on 15 November 2009. Kshanakkathu-fame Niyaz played a negative role in this film as he did with several films of the 2000s.

== Reception ==
Veeyen of Nowrunning wrote that "Annarakkannanum Thannalayathu fits into the Kalabhavan Mani film mould quite adeptly. What I mean is, it starts off with an introduction to the village bumpkin with loads of goodness in the heart, lets him break into a foot tapping song quite soon enough, has him bash up a couple of baddies who simply refuse to listen to him, fall in love with a woman who sees the real him, and finally walk off into the sunset with the girl and his aides in tow".
