= Anupama Niranjana =

Indian writer (1934-1991)

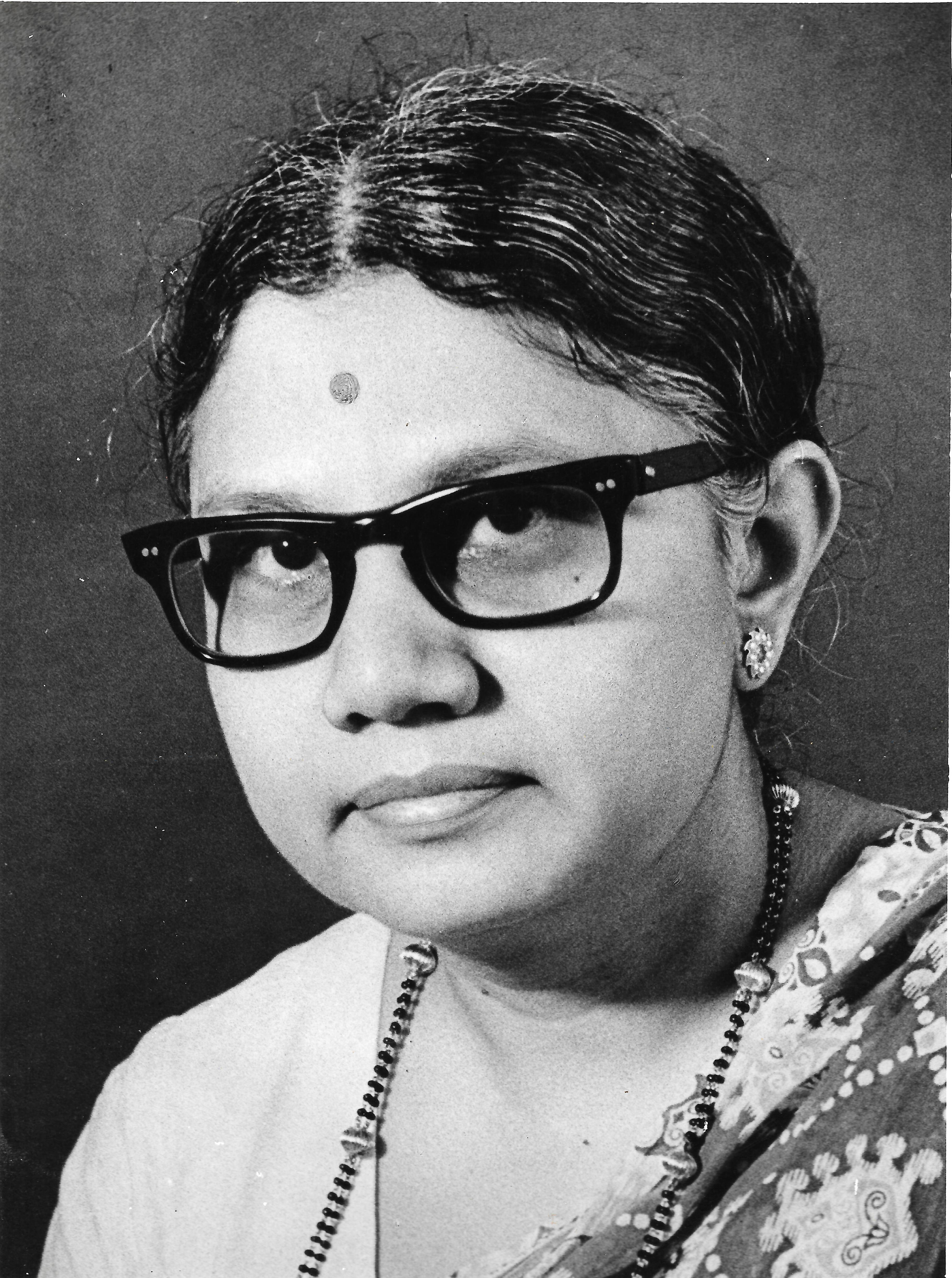
- Born: Venkatalakshmi; 1934; Tirthahalli, India
- Died: 1991 (aged 56–57)
- Occupations: Doctor, writer
- Spouse: Niranjana

Anupama Niranjana (1934–1991) was a doctor in India and writer of modern Kannada fiction and non-fiction.

She advocated the woman's point of view and was one among such writers in Kannada, which includes others like Triveni and M. K. Indira. Her novel Runamuktalu was made into a film by Puttanna Kanagal.

Born Venkatalakshmi, Anupama practiced as a physician in Dharwad and Bangalore. Anupama took to writing early in life and wrote several novels and stories dealing with social issues, particularly women's issue. She was married to the Kannada writer Niranjana, a novelist of the Progressive school of modern Kannada literature. Their daughters Tejaswini and Seemanthini are academics.

Anupama died of cancer. An award has been instituted in her name for women writing in Kannada.

== Major works ==
- Anantha Geetha
- Shwetambari
- Sneha Pallavi
- Runamuktalu
- Kanmani
- Odalu
- Nenapu: Sihi-Kahi
- Kallola
- Aala
- Mukti Chitra
- Madhavi
- Ghosha
- Nati
- Moolamukhi (last novel)
- Cancer Jagattu
- Taayi magu
- Dinakkondu kathe (collection of children's stories)

== Major awards ==
- Karnataka Sahitya Akademi Award
- Soviet Land Nehru Award
- Kannada Rajyotsava
