= Niranjana (writer) =

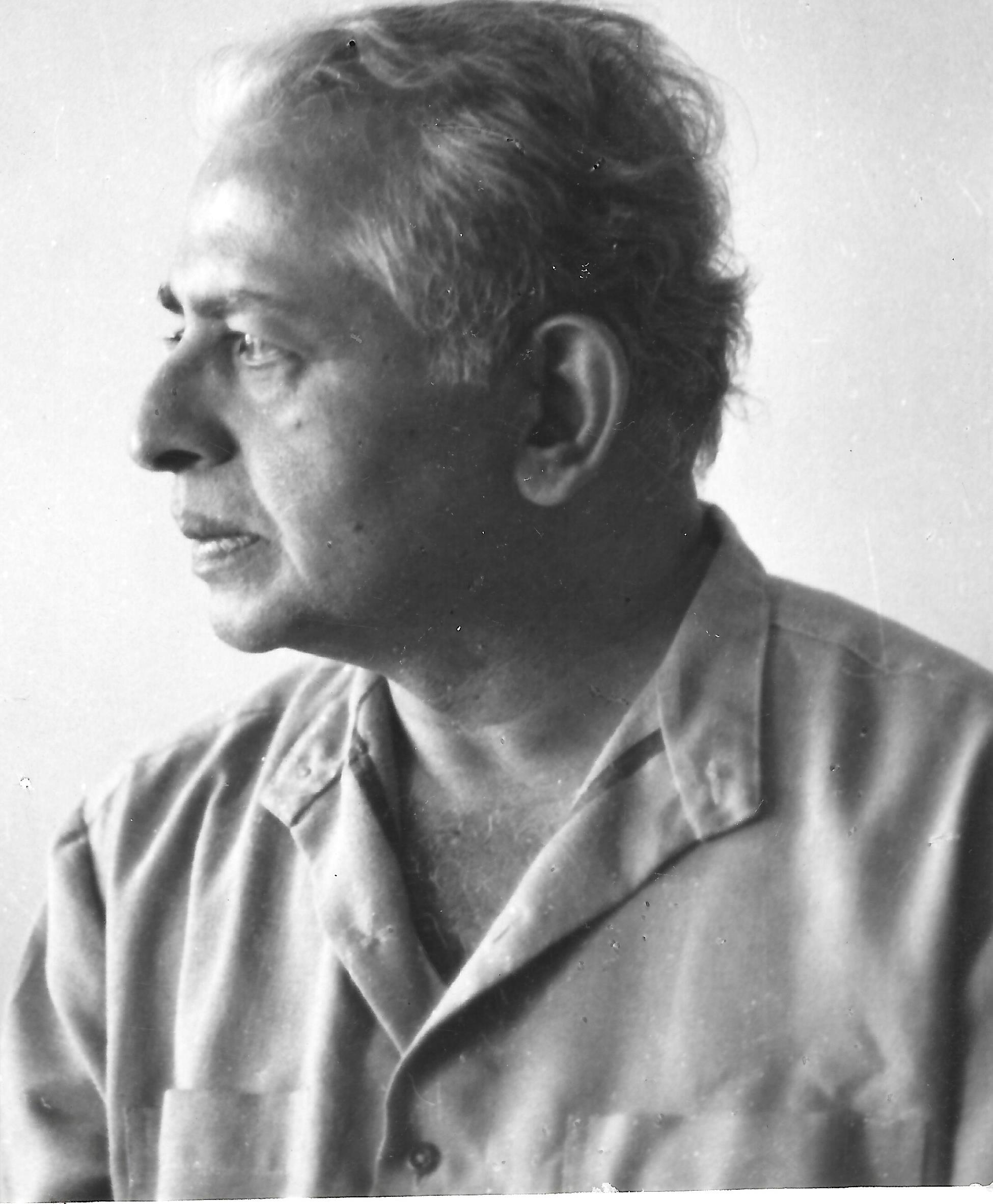
- Born: Kulakunda Shiva Rao; 15 June 1924
- Died: 13 March 1992 (aged 67); Hyderabad, Andhra Pradesh, India
- Occupations: Writer, Novelist
- Spouse: Anupama Niranjana

Kulakunda Shiva Rao (15 June 1924 – 13 March 1992), popularly known as Niranjana, was a Kannada playwright, novelist and a freedom fighter. The hardships faced during childhood shaped Niranjana's later literary career.

== Writing career ==
Niranjana wrote more than sixty books. His first published novel was Vimochane (Wait for the moon) published in 1953. Some of his other notable works are— Chirasmarane, and Mrityunjaya. He also edited Kannada translation of Vishwa Katha Kosha (A Treasury of World Short Stories). He also translated a number of works into Kannada language.

Niranjana was attracted to Marxism during his youth and was an active member of the Communist Party of India. He became disillusioned later and left it but still continued to raise his voice for the downtrodden and oppressed through his writings. He suffered a stroke in 1971 when he was at his zenith of writing career. He wrote Mrityunjaya in 1976. Chirasmarane is based on the historic Kayyur incident of the 1940s in Kasaragod district where peasants rose against local landlords. Chirasmarane was adapted into a 1986 Malayalam movie Meenamasathile Sooryan by Lenin Rajendran.

He edited Vishwa Katha Kosha, a 25-volume work which made stories from around the world available in Kannada and also worked as an editor to bring out the Kannada Jnana Kosha.

Niranjana married Venkata Lakshmi, who later become a writer (with the pen name Anupama Niranjana). They have two daughters, Seemanthini and Tejaswini. His wife died of cancer in 1991. Niranjana died a year later, on 13 March 1992 in Hyderabad, due to illness.

== Bibliography ==
- Vimochane (Wait for the Moon, first novel)
- Chirasmarane (1955)
- Mrtyunjaya (1976)
- Vishwa Katha Kosha (A Treasury of World Short Stories, editor)
- Kalyaanaswamy (Novel)

== Awards and honours ==
Niranjana received these awards and honours—

- Karnataka Sahitya Akademi Award
- Nehru Soviet Land Award
