= Aye Auto =

- Theatrical release poster
- Directed by: Venu Nagavalli
- Written by: Venu Nagavalli
- Produced by: Maniyanpilla Raju
- Starring: Mohanlal; Rekha
- Cinematography: S. Kumar
- Edited by: N. Gopalakrishnan
- Music by: Raveendran (songs); Johnson (score)
- Production company: Saraswathy Chaithanya
- Distributed by: Shirdisai Release
- Release date: 25 January 1990
- Running time: 137 minutes
- Country: India
- Language: Malayalam
- Budget: ₹24 lakh (US$25,000)

Aye Auto (transl. Hey Auto) is a 1990 Indian Malayalam-language romantic comedy film written and directed by Venu Nagavalli and produced by Maniyanpilla Raju. The film stars Mohanlal and Rekha in the lead roles. The songs were composed by Raveendran, while Johnson provided the background score. The plot follows the life of auto drivers in the city of Kozhikode in Kerala. Aye Auto was the second highest-grossing Malayalam film of 1990 at the box office, behind His Highness Abdullah also starring Mohanlal.

== Plot ==
Sudhi is an auto-rickshaw driver who meets Meenakshi, the granddaughter of a well-off family. Sudhi and Meenakshi fall in love but face strong opposition from her family, their only support being her grandfather, Krishna Pillai. Sudhi plans to marry Meenakshi in front of a registrar. He pens a note about the marriage time at the marriage office. However Dominique, Sudhi's friend auto driver, finds this note and hands it over to Bhadran. Bhadran plans and gets Meenakshi abducted by changing the timings on the note sent to the grandfather. Meenakshi's grandfather comes to know about Meenakshi missing when Suresh goes to pick up Meenakshi as planned by Sudhi. He along with Suresh immediately meets Sudhi and informs him about Meenakshi being missing. The police, despite having the duty of protecting the law, start breaking it. During the search Bhadran gets Sudhi abducted as well and torments him. Sub-Inspector along with another friend hunts down the location of Sudhi and Meenakshi. After an ensuing battle Sudhi and his friends manage to fend of Bhadran and coup & eventually save Meenakshi. In the end Love triumphs and wins everyone's heart and the grandparents grants their blessings, send them together to have a happy married life.

== Cast ==
- Mohanlal as Sudhi
- Rekha as Meenakshi ('Meenu'/'Meenukutty'), Sudhi's Love Interest
- Sreenivasan as Sub Inspector Aneesh, Sudhi's Friend
- Thikkurissy Sukumaran Nair as Retd. Banker Krishna Pillai ('Yechhi'Krishnan) Meenakshi's Maternal Grandfather
- Maniyanpilla Raju as Thangu, Sudhi's Friend
- Jagadish as Sreekrishnan, Sudhi's Friend
- K. B. Ganesh Kumar as Suresh, Sudhi's Friend
- Kuthiravattam Pappu as Haji Moidu, Sudhi's Friend
- Murali as Bhadran, Krishna Pillai's Relative
- M. G. Soman as City Police Commissioner Ranganath
- Sukumari as Janaki, Krishna Pillai's Wife and Meenakshi's Maternal Grandmother
- Mohan Jose as Dominic, Bhadran's Aide
- Shyama as Chithra, Police Commissioner's Daughter and Meenakshi's Friend
- Kunchan as Ramanan, Sudhi's Friend
- Kunjandi as Rashid Moopah
- Valsala Menon as College Principal
- Nandu as Lonappan, Sudhi's Friend and Hospital Attender
- Adoor Pankajam as Pankajakshi
- Keerikkadan Jose as Circle Inspector of Police, Bhadran's Friend
- Ashokan as Sunnykutty (Cameo)
- Augustine as Bhadran's Friend
- Santha Devi as Sunnykutty's Mother (Cameo)
- Jomol as Student in the auto

== Soundtrack ==
The film score was composed by Johnson while the songs were composed by Raveendran.

All lyrics are written by Bichu Thirumala.

No.	Title	Artist(s)	Length
1.	"A. E. I. O. U" (Madhyamavati)	Mohanlal, Sujatha Mohan
2.	"Auto Auto"	P. Jayachandran, M. G. Sreekumar
3.	"Sundari Sundari" (Vasantha (raga))	M. G. Sreekumar, Choir
4.	"Saraswathi (Bit)" (Traditional Folk)	M. G. Radhakrishnan

== Reception ==
Aye Auto widely received positive response and was the second highest-grossing Malayalam film of 1990 at the box office, behind His Highness Abdullah.
