= Sukhamo Devi =

- Promotional poster
- Directed by: Venu Nagavally
- Written by: Venu Nagavally
- Produced by: Gandhimathi Balan
- Starring: Mohanlal; Shankar; Urvashi; Geetha
- Cinematography: S. Kumar
- Edited by: K. P. Hariharaputhran
- Music by: Raveendran (Songs); M. B. Sreenivasan (Score)
- Production company: Gandhimathi Productions
- Distributed by: Gandhimathi Release
- Release date: 12 September 1986
- Country: India
- Language: Malayalam

Sukhamo Devi (transl. Devi, are you doing well?) is a 1986 Indian Malayalam-language romantic drama film written and directed by Venu Nagavally (in his directorial debut). The story was based on his own life experience. It stars Mohanlal, Shankar, Urvashi, and Geetha and features songs composed by Raveendran and a score by M. B. Sreenivasan.

== Plot ==
Two good friends, Nandan and Sunny, are singers in their senior year of college. Nandan is a hard-working introvert while Sunny is well-rounded, sporty, and loved among his friends. Nandan and Sunny have girlfriends, Devi and Thara, respectively, who match them exactly in personality. Sunny also has another loyal pal named Vinod who tends to get a bit annoying sometimes, but Sunny appreciates him nevertheless.

When Sunny and Nandan graduate college with the highest honors, they decide to marry their girlfriends. Thara's parents approve of Sunny, but Devi's father does not approve of Nandan when he sees that Nandan works as a waiter at a restaurant. Devi's father even decides to have an arranged marriage for her, about which Nandan and Sunny get really upset. Sunny promises that he will convince Devi's father to change his mind. He plans to get Nandan and Devi married at a register office with the help of Chandran by getting Devi out of her house in disguise for a temple visit. However, things still stay the same, and Devi's arranged marriage goes as planned.

On the morning of Devi's wedding, worse turns to worst when news arrives saying that Sunny got killed in a motorbike accident with Vinod in critical condition at the hospital. It is later discovered that Vinod survives the accident, but loses his ability to talk. Thara gets extremely devastated and starts living as a widow. Nandan obeys Sunny's wish for him to be a playback singer for movies and eventually gains fame and wealth from doing so. Sunny's brother introduces Nandan to a music director who promotes him in the film world. From this part of the movie to the end, all the characters hear Sunny's voice in random places, making them feel his presence in their hearts.

On one of Nandan's tours to his hometown, he stays in a hotel and discovers that the receptionist is Devi. He calls her later, telling her, "Sukhamo Devi?" (Are you doing alright, Devi?), the title of the movie. He eventually meets her husband, Dr. Venugopal, who tells Nandan to move on with life, and that the arranged marriage wasn't his choice either.

Meanwhile, Nandan tries to cheer up Thara, who has yet to recover from the shock of Sunny's death. Devi, along with her daughter, leaves for Goa to be with her husband for good with Nandan promising her that they will unite in heaven one day. The final scene shows Nandan and Thara watching Devi's plane leave with Sunny's voice telling Nandan to "look after Thara like gold". At that moment, Nandan and Thara decide to get married until they reunite with their true loves in heaven. The movie ends with the words "A practical solution for a love tragedy" on the screen.

== Cast ==
- Mohanlal as Sunny
- Shankar as Nandan
- Urvashi as Devi
- Geetha as Thara
- Jagathy Sreekumar as Vinod
- Janardhanan as Ouseppachan, Thara's brother
- Jagannatha Varma as Krishnan, Devi's father
- Sukumari as Radhika, Devi's mother
- K. B. Ganesh Kumar as Chandru, Devi's brother
- M. G. Soman as Dr. Ambikadmajan Nair
- K. P. A. C. Sunny as Stephen, Sunny's brother
- Priya
- Shankaradi as Fauji Rajashekharan
- Thikkurissy Sukumaran Nair as Alexander, Sunny's father
- Kaviyoor Ponnamma as Nandan's mother
- Santhakumari
- Sumithra as Sunny's sister-in-law
- Nedumudi Venu as Dr. Venugopal, Devi's husband (cameo)
- Venu Nagavally as Man at the bar (guest appearance)

== Production ==
Sukhamo Devi marks the directorial debut of Venu Nagavally. The film is based on his own life experience.

== Soundtrack ==
The soundtrack was composed by music Raveendran to the lyrics penned by O. N. V. Kurup. The soundtrack was well received and includes the evergreen melodies of all time in Malayalam film music. K. J. Yesudas and K. S. Chithra have lent their voice to the soundtracks.

Track listing
No.	Title	Singer(s)	Length
1.	"Sukhamo Devi"	K. J. Yesudas	4:37
2.	"Shreelathikakal"	K. J. Yesudas	4:45
3.	"Oru Kunju Sooryane"	K. J. Yesudas, K. S. Chithra	3:12
Total length:			13:19
