= Venu Nagavally =

Indian actor

- Venu Nagavally
- Born: N. S. Venugopal; 16 April 1949; Ramankary, Kingdom of Travancore, Dominion of India (present day Alappuzha, Kerala, India)
- Died: 9 September 2010 (aged 61); Thiruvananthapuram, Kerala, India
- Occupations: Actor; film director; screenwriter
- Spouse: Meera
- Children: 1
- Parents: Nagavally R. S. Kurup; Rajamma

Venu Nagavally (16 April 1949 – 10 September 2010) was an Indian actor, screenwriter and director best known for his work in Malayalam film industry. The son of writer, commentator, and broadcaster Nagavally R. S. Kurup, Venu Nagavally made his film debut with Ulkkadal, where he played the role of an idealistic lover. He was considered a handsome lead in his early career, often appearing as a romantic youth. His soft demeanor also made him well-suited for melancholic characters. Later in his career, he shifted to supporting roles. Having acted in over 50 films, he went on to direct 12 films, the majority of which were critically and commercially successful, including Sukhamo Devi (1986), Sarvakalashala (1987), Lal Salam (1990), and Aye Auto (1990), Aayirappara (1993). Venu Nagavally died at Thiruvananthapuram on 9 September 2010.

== Early life ==
Venu Nagavally was born on 16 April 1949 as the son of the noted play writer Nagavally R. S. Kurup and Rajamma. Ramachandran, Vasundara and Lalithambika are his siblings. He completed his education from Government Model Boys Higher Secondary School, Thiruvananthapuram and University College Thiruvananthapuram. He had a bachelor's degree in Politics and a Diploma in journalism. Venu Nagavally died at KIMS hospital in Thiruvananthapuram on 9 September 2010 due to liver cirrhosis. He was 61 at the time of his death, and was cremated with full state honours at Santhikavadam crematorium on the same day. He is survived by his son Vivek. Meera Venu Nagavally, his wife, died on 26 April 2025.

== Career ==
Venu started his career as an announcer in Akashvani. He later sung a song in the movie Chottanikkara Amma (1976) but was noticed only in 1978 when he acted in the movie Ulkkadal (1979) directed by K. G. George, thus starting his acting career in movies. His noted movies as an actor are Shalini Ente Koottukari, Meenamasathile Sooryan, Pakshe, and Chillu.

Venu's first movie as a director was Sukhamo Devi (1986) which he himself describes as his own tragical love story. Later he directed the superhit movies Lal Salam, Aey Auto, Aayirappara, Rakthasaakshikal Zindabad etc. Lal Salaam and Rakthasaakshikal Zindabad revolved around the lives of the early Communist leaders of Kerala. It was his directorial projects like "Sughamo devi", "Sarvakalashala", "Aey Auto" and "Lal Salam" that cemented Mohanlal's status as a superstar, in the late 1980s. Venu has also written scripts for a few movies including the Priyadarshan directed blockbuster movie Kilukkam. His first movie as a script writer was Ee Ganam Marakkumo.

His oeuvre also had a strain of his left leanings; in addition to acting in films like Meenamasathile Sooryan (about the Kayyur revolt) and heading the production wing of a pro-left television channel, two of the films he directed – Lal Salam (1990) and Raksthasakhikal Zindabad (1998) – were an introspective look at the rise and fall of communist ideals. Venu examines these issues by dealing with the cracks in political movements, its hopes and later degeneration, create in human relationships.

The movies for which he has sung songs include Chillu, Ente Ammu Ninte Thulasi Avarude Chakki, Oru Painkilikatha out of which the song "Kochu Chakkarachi Pettu" from the movie Ente Ammu, Ninte Thulasi, Avarude Chakki became quite popular.

== Filmography ==
=== Actor ===
Year	Title	Role	Notes
1978	Ulkkadal	Rahulan	
1978	Shalini Ente Koottukari	Prabha	
1980	Aniyatha Valakkal	Ravi Shankar	
1980	Ishtamanu Pakshe		
1980	Kalika	Sadhan	
1980	Akalangalil Abhayam		
1981	Maniyan Pilla Adhava Maniyan Pilla	Rahim	
1981	Kaloopasana		
1981	Tharattu	Unni	
1981	Archana Teacher		
1981	Kolangal	Cheriyan	
1982	Oru Vilipadakale	Vishnu	
1982	Kattile Pattu	Devan	
1982	Kilukilukkam	Murali	
1982	Yavanika	Joseph Kollapally	
1982	Ithiri Neram Othiri Karyam		
1982	Chillu	Ananthu	
1983	Eenam		
1983	Premnazirne Kanmanilla		
1983	Parasparam	Vishwanathan	
1983	Rugma		
1983	Kathi		
1983	Oru Swakaryam	Chandran	
1983	Omanathinkal		
1983	Prasnam Gurutharam	Venu	
1983	Lekhayude Maranam Oru Flashback		
1983	April 18	Advocate Thomachan	
1983	Adaminte Variyellu	Gopi	
1984	Panchavadi Palam	Jeemudhavahanan	
1984	Arante Mulla Kochu Mulla	Joy	
1984	Velichamillatha Veedhi		
1984	Swantham Sarika	Murali	
1984	Thirakal	Balan	
1984	Ente Nandinikutty		
1984	Oru Painkili Kadha	Gopi	
1985	Puzhayozhukum Vazhi	Hari	
1985	Oru Kudakeezhil	Unni	
1985	Uyarukm Njan Nadaake	Vivek	
1985	Meenamasathile Sooryan	Matathil Appu	
1985	Ente Ammu Ninte Thulasi Avarude Chakki	Shakthi	
1985	Adhyayam Onnu Muthal	Rameshan Nair	
1986	Sunil Vayassu 20	Jayakumar	
1986	Sukhamo Devi	Man at the bar	Cameo
1986	Oru Katha Oru Nunnakkatha		
1986	Meenamaasathile Sooryan	Appu	
1986	Vartha	Devan	
1987	Arinjo Ariyatheyo		
1987	Theertham	Radhakrishnan	
1988	Moonnam Pakkam	Jayan	
1989	Crime Branch		
1989	Devadas	Devadas	
1994	Pakshe	Unniyettan	
1994	Pavam IA Ivachan		
1994	Minnaram	Baby	
1998	Harikrishnans	Vishwambharan	
2004	Wanted	Krishnadas	
2004	Sathyam	Chief Minister	
2004	Kaazhcha	Magistrate	
2005	Deepangal Sakshi	Advocate	
2005	Pauran	Chief Minister	
2006	Pathaka	Shekharji	
2006	Out of Syllabus		
2006	Photographer		
2006	Baba Kalyani	DIG Bose K. Nianan IPS	
2007	Anchil Oral Arjunan	Padmanabhan	
2007	Heartbeats		
2007	Indraneelam		
2008	Roudram	Doctor	
2009	Bhagyadevatha	Anto	
2010	College Days	Rohit Menon's father	
2013	Careebeyans	Joseph	Posthumously

=== As director ===
Year	Title	Starring
1986	Sukhamo Devi	Shankar, Mohanlal, Urvashi, Geetha
1987	Sarvakalashala	Mohanlal, Sukumaran, Nedumudi Venu, Seema
1988	Ayitham	Mohanlal, Nedumudi Venu, Sukumaran, Ambika, Radha
1989	Swagatham	Jayaram, Nedumudi Venu, Ashokan, Parvathi, Urvashi
1990	Lal Salam	Mohanlal, Geetha, Murali, Urvashi
1990	Aye Auto	Mohanlal, Rekha, Murali, Sreenivasan
1991	Kizhakkunarum Pakshi	Mohanlal, Shankar, Rekha, Murali
1993	Kalippattam	Mohanlal, Urvashi, Jagathy Sreekumar, Thilakan
1993	Aayirappara	Mammootty, Urvashi, Madhu, Narendra Prasad
1995	Agnidevan	Mohanlal, Revathi, Rohini Hattangadi, Captain Raju, Devan
1998	Rakthasakshikal Sindabad	Mohanlal, Suresh Gopi, Murali, Sukanya
2009	Bharya Swantham Suhruthu	Jagathy Sreekumar, Urvashi, Mukesh, Padmapriya

=== Writer ===
- Bharya Swantham Suhruthu (2009) (screenplay)
- Vishnu (1994) (screenplay and dialogue)
- Aayirappara (1993) (writer)
- Kalippattam (1993) (writer)
- Kilukkam (1991) (writer)
- Kizhakkunarum Pakshi (1991) (screenplay and dialogue)
- Aye Auto (1990) (writer)
- Ardham (1989) (writer)
- Sarvakalasala (1987) (screenplay and dialogue)
- Sukhamodevi (1986) (writer)
- Gayathri Devi Entae Amma (1985) (Screenplay)
- Guruji Oru Vaakku (1985)
- Daivathae Orthu (1985)
- Ee Gaanam Marakkumo (1978) (screenplay)

== Television ==
- Ente Manasaputhri (Asianet)
- Kadamattath Kathanar (Asianet)
- Mizhi thurakumbol (Surya TV)
- "Thinkalum Tharakangalum" (Amrita TV)
- Marubhumiyil pookkalam
- Ekaakini
- Arohanam
- Chitta (Surya TV)
- Thanichu (Asianet)
- Ohari
- Kurukhetram
- Gandhari
- Mangalyam (Asianet)
- Manaswini (DD Malayalam)
- Thalolam (Asianet)
- Ellam Mayajaalam (Asianet)
- Kannan Vannengil (Surya TV)
