= List of Malayalam films of 2014 =

The tables list the Malayalam films released in theaters in the year 2014.

== Released films ==
Opening		Title	Director	Cast	Genre	Ref
J A N U A R Y	4	Kulamkuthikal	Shibu Chellamangalam	Sony, Sajan, Sajna, Sreekutti	Drama	
J A N U A R Y	4	Life	Leon K. Thomas	Niyaz, Sarangi		
J A N U A R Y	17	Black Forest	Joshy Mathew	Manoj K. Jayan, Meera Nandan	Children's film	
J A N U A R Y	17	Pranayakadha	Aadhi Balakrishnan	Arun V. Narayan, Swarna Thomas	Romance	
J A N U A R Y	23	Salala Mobiles	Sharath A. Haridaasan	Dulquer Salman, Nazriya Nazim, Santhanam, Anju Sasi, Siddique	Romance	
J A N U A R Y	24	Bhoomiyude Avakashikal	T. V. Chandran	Kailash, Sreenivasan, Mythili, Meera Nandan	Drama	
J A N U A R Y	24	Mannar Mathai Speaking 2	Mamas K. Chandran	Mukesh, Sai Kumar, Innocent, Aparna Gopinath, Janardhanan, Vijayaraghavan, Biju Menon	Comedy Drama	
J A N U A R Y	31	1983	Abrid Shine	Nivin Pauly, Anoop Menon, Joy Mathew, Nikki Galrani	Sports	
J A N U A R Y	31	Chayilyam	Manoj Kana	Anumol, M.R. Gopakumar	Drama	
J A N U A R Y	31	Flat No. 4B	Krishnajith S Vijayan	Riaz M T, Swarna Thomas, Lakshmi Sharma, Abid Anwar	Family	
F E B R U A R Y	1	London Bridge	Anil C Menon	Prithviraj Sukumaran, Andrea Jeremiah, Nanditha Raj, Pratap Pothen, Lena	Drama	
F E B R U A R Y	7	Ohm Shanthi Oshaana	Jude Antony joseph	Nivin Pauly, Nazriya Nazim, Vineeth Srinivasan, Aju Varghese, Vinaya Prasad, Renji Panicker, Lal Jose	Romantic Comedy	
F E B R U A R Y	7	Balyakalasakhi	Pramod Payyannur	Mammootty, Isha Talwar, Meena, Mamukkoya	Drama	
F E B R U A R Y	13	Salaam Kashmier	Joshiy	Suresh Gopi, Jayaram, Miya, Lalu Alex	Action	
F E B R U A R Y	14	Pakida	Sunil Karyattukara	Asif Ali, Biju Menon, Shine Tom Chacko, Malavika Sai	Thriller	
F E B R U A R Y	14	@Andheri	Biju Bhaskar Nair	Sreenivasan, Aparna Nair, Atul Kulkarni, Bineesh Kodiyeri	Drama	
F E B R U A R Y	14	Dial 1091	Santo Thattil	Lalu Alex, Sivaji Guruvayoor	Awareness	
F E B R U A R Y	21	Alice: A True Story	Anil Das	Priyamani, Prathap Pothan, Rahul Madhav	Drama	
F E B R U A R Y	21	Happy Journey	Boban Samuel	Jayasurya, Aparna Gopinath, Lal, Lalu Alex	Drama	
F E B R U A R Y	21	Thomson Villa	Abin Jacob	Ananya, Hemanth Menon, Sarayu, Innocent	Family	
F E B R U A R Y	27	Swapaanam	Shaji N. Karun	Jayaram, Siddique, Kadmbari, Lakshmi Gopalaswamy	Drama, Musical	
F E B R U A R Y	28	Ettekaal Second	Kanakaraghavan	Govind Padmasoorya, Miya	Drama, Romantic	
F E B R U A R Y	28	Manja	Binoy Urmise	Niyas, Ramesh Pisharody	Comedey	
F E B R U A R Y	28	Minimolude Achan	Santhosh Pandit	Santhosh Pandit, Sonia	Romantic, Drama	
F E B R U A R Y	28	Nattarangu	Ramesh Maniyath	Irshad, Vaigha	Drama	
F E B R U A R Y	28	Parayan Baaki Vechathu	Kareem	Maqbool Salmaan, Anumol, Devika	Political	
F E B R U A R Y	28	Raktharakshas 3D	R Factor	Sunny Wayne, Ananya	Horror	
M A R C H	7	On The Way	Shanu Samad	Sidhartha Shiva, Swasika, Surabhi	Thriller	
M A R C H	7	Chakkaramampazham	P. Babu	Kalabhavan Mani, Rajani Murali	Drama	
M A R C H	7	Snehamulloral Koodeyullappol	Riju Nair	Madhu, Manikkuttan, Sunu Lakshmi	Romance	
M A R C H	7	Hangover	Sreejith Sukumaran	Maqbool Salmaan, Shine Tom Chacko, Archana Gupta, Shritha Sivadas		
M A R C H	14	Konthayum Poonoolum	Jijo Antony	Kunchacko Boban, Bhama	Drama	
M A R C H	14	Father in Love	Vijayakumar K G	Aasique, Kaveri, Navya	Drama	
M A R C H	14	Vasanthathinte Kanal Vazhikalil	Anil V. Nagendran	Samuthirakani, Mukesh, Surabhi Lakshmi, Sudheesh, Siddique	Patriortism	
M A R C H	20	Praise the Lord	Shibu Gangadharan	Mammooty, Reenu Mathews	Family	
M A R C H	21	Parankimala	Sennan Pallassery	Biyon, Vinuda Lal	Romance	
M A R C H	28	Puravasthu	M. S. Mahendra Kumar	Pious Paul, Gopika Lal, Sunil Sukhada	Thriller	
M A R C H	28	Mr. Wrong Number	Surya Menon	Diyono, Alphy, Karthik Sreekumar, Akhil Augustin, Abhay Ravi	Thriller	
M A R C H	28	Oru Campus Kadha	George Vettom	Rishi, Nanma Somanath	Romance	
M A R C H	29	Onnum Mindathe	Sugeeth	Jayaram, Meera Jasmine, Manoj K Jayan	Drama	
A P R I L	4	Day Night Game	Shibu Prabhakar	Jithan Ramesh, Maqbool Salmaan, Archana Kavi, Bhagath Manuel	Thriller	
A P R I L	4	Gamer	M. R. Anoop Raj	Arjun Nandakumar, Basil, Nedumudi Venu, Devadevan, Hanna Bella	Thriller	
A P R I L	4	Ponnarayan	Jibin Edavanakkad	Babu Jose, Liana Raj	Drama	
A P R I L	11	Gangster	Aashiq Abu	Mammootty, Nyla Usha, Aparna Gopinath, Sekhar Menon	Crime thriller	
A P R I L	12	7th Day	Syamdhar	Prithviraj, Vinay Forrt, Anu Mohan, Janani Iyer	Crime thriller	
A P R I L	12	Ring Master	Rafi	Dileep, Honey Rose, Keerthy Suresh, Kalabhavan Shajon	Family	
A P R I L	12	Polytechnic	M. Padmakumar	Kunchacko Boban, Aju Varghese, Bhavana	Family	
A P R I L	19	1 by Two	Arun Kumar Aravind	Fahadh Faasil, Murali Gopy, Honey Rose, Abhinaya	Psychological thriller	
A P R I L	25	Masala Republic	Visakh GS	Indrajith, Sunny Wayne, Aparna Nair	Satire	
A P R I L	25	Samsaaram Aarogyathinu Haanikaram	Balaji Mohan	Dulquer Salmaan, Nazriya Nazim, Maniyanpilla Raju	Comedy	
M A Y	1	Mosayile Kuthira Meenukal	Ajith Pillai	Asif Ali, Sunny Wayne, Janani Iyer, Swati Reddy	Adventure	
M A Y	1	Law Point	Lijin Jose	Kunchacko Boban, Namitha Pramod	Drama	
M A Y	1	To Noora with Love	Babu Narayanan	Mamta Mohandas, Krish Sathaar, Kaniha, Archana Kavi	Romance	
M A Y	2	Ulsaha Committee	Akku Akbar	Jayaram, Isha Talwar, Sheela, Suraj Venjaramoodu, Kalabhavan Shajon	Comedy	
M A Y	2	One Day Jokes	Santhosh G	Sreejith Vijay, Rachana, Rupasri	Silent film	
M A Y	9	God's Own Country	Vasudev Sanal	Fahadh Faasil, Sreenivasan, Lal, Mythili, Isha Talwar	Thriller	
M A Y	9	My Dear Mummy	G. Mahadevan	Urvashi, Sandhya, Vinu Mohan	Drama	
M A Y	9	The Last Supper	Vinil Vasu	Unni Mukundan, Anu Mohan, Pearle Maaney	Thriller	
M A Y	9	Ezhu Desangalkumakale	Rasheed	Sreejith Ravi, Varsha, Faizal, Vaikom Vijayalakshmi	Drama	
M A Y	16	Medulla Oblongata	Suresh Nair	Rahul Madhav, Saiju Kurup, Rakendhu	Drama	
M A Y	17	How Old Are You	Roshan Andrews	Kunchacko Boban, Manju Warrier, Kanika, Siddhartha Basu, Lalu Alex, Vinay Forrt, Kunchan, Amritha Anil, Thesni Khan	Drama	
M A Y	17	Mr. Fraud	B. Unnikrishnan	Mohanlal, Miya, Dev Gill, Siddique	Action	
M A Y	23	To Let Ambadi Talkies	Sakkir Madathil	Arjun Asokan, Sinil Zainudheen, Swarna Thomas, Devika	Drama	
M A Y	30	Bangalore Days	Anjali Menon	Nivin Pauly, Dulquer Salman, Fahadh Faasil, Nazriya Nazim, Parvathi Menon, Nithya Menon, Isha Talwar, Prathap Pothen, Kalpana, Maniyanpilla Raju, Praveena	Drama	
M A Y	30	Call Me @	Francis Thanikal	Arjun Nandakumar, Natasha	Romance	
M A Y	30	Spider House	Sanjeev Babu	Vishnu, Sini Varghese, Naveen, Rajeswari	Drama	
J U N E	6	Charithra Vamsam	Pravinkumar	Siva, Nelson, Shilpa	Revenge	
J U N E	6	Garbhasreeman	Anil Gopinath	Suraj Venjaramoodu, Kalabhavan Shajon, Gauri Krishna	Comedy	
J U N E	6	My Life Partner	M. B. Padmakumar	Sudhev, Ameer, Sukanya, Anusree	Drama	
J U N E	6	Pianist	M. Hyderali	Anu Mohan, Manochitra	Musical	
J U N E	13	Koothara	Srinath Rajendran	Mohanlal, Bharath, Sunny Wayne, Bhavana (Malayalam actress), Janani Iyer	Thriller	
J U N E	13	Naku Penta Naku Taka	Vayalar Madhavankutty	Indrajith, Bhama, Murali Gopy, Shankar	Thriller	
J U N E	13	Test Paper	S. Vinodkumar	Jagadeesh, Nandu, Munna, Mahalekshmi	Drama	
J U N E	14	Angry Babies in Love	Saji Surendran	Anoop Menon, Bhavana, Anusree	Romantic comedy	
J U N E	20	Beware of Dogs	Vishnu Prasad	Sreenath Bhasi, Sekhar Menon	Comedy	
J U N E	20	Gunda	Salim Baba	Kalabhavan Mani, Tini Tom, Sunil Sukhada	Crime	
J U N E	20	Nilavurangumpol	Sidhiq Paravoor	Rajitha, Nishil, Sreeni Kodungallur	Drama	
J U N E	20	Swaha	Rajesh, Usman	Avinash, Sona, Mamukkoya, Bijukkuttan	Drama	
J U N E	27	Monayi Angane Aanaayi	Santhosh Khan	Aju Varghese, Bhagath Manuel	Comedy	
J U N E	27	Wound	Rajasenan	Rajasenan, Mersheena Neenu, Divya, Krishnapriya	Family	
J U N E	27	Njananu Party	Snoba Alex	Kalashala Babu, Tony, Aishwarya	Drama	
J U N E	27	Christmas Cake	Sajan Kurien	Akhil, Fr. Thomas, Jagadeesh	Drama	
J U L Y	4	Malayalakkara Residency	Kuttichal Sasikumar	Jagathy Sreekumar, Innocent, Suraj Venjaramoodu, Kalpana	Comedy	
J U L Y	11	Vegam	K. G. Anil Kumar	Vineeth Kumar, Prathap Pothen, Shammi Thilakan, Samskruthy Shenoy, Jacob Gregory	Thriller	
J U L Y	18	Iniyum Ethra Dhooram	P. R. Krishna	Madhu, Ambika Mohan	Family, Drama	
J U L Y	18	Shesham KadhaBhagam	Bhagyanathan C G	Anoop Chandran, Anjana, Mohan Ayiroor	Drama	
J U L Y	18	Solar Swapnam	Joy Antony	Devan, Bhuvana, Seema G Nair	Drama	
J U L Y	18	Tharangal	Jeevan	Anoop Chandran, Rishikesh, Rupashri, Seema G Nair, Rajasahib	Drama	
J U L Y	25	Vikramadithyan	Lal Jose'	Dulquer Salmaan, Unni Mukundan, Anoop Menon, Namitha Pramod, Lena	Drama	
J U L Y	26	Hi I'm Tony	Jean Paul Lal	Asif Ali, Miya, Lal, Lena, Biju Menon	Psycho Thriller	
J U L Y	27	Manglish	Salam Bappu	Mammootty, Tini Tom, Vinay Forrt, Caroline Beck, Alexx O'Nell	Comedy	
A U G U S T	1	Avatharam	Joshiy	Dileep, Lakshmi Menon, Joy Mathew, Mithun Ramesh	Action, Thriller	
A U G U S T	7	Apothecary	Madhav Ramadasan	Suresh Gopi, Jayasurya, Asif Ali, Indrans, Abhirami, Meera Nandan	Medical Thriller	
A U G U S T	8	Njan Steve Lopez	Rajeev Ravi	Farhaan Faasil, Ahaana Krishna	Drama	
A U G U S T	15	Shadow Man	Majo C. Matthew	Riyaz Khan	Thriller	
A U G U S T	22	Munnariyippu	Venu	Mammootty, Aparna Gopinath, Nedumudi Venu	Thriller	
A U G U S T	22	John Paul Vaathil Thurakkunnu	Chandrahasan	Deepak Parambol, Sudip, Joshy, Shruthi	Thriller	
A U G U S T	22	Mizhi Thurakku	Dr. Santhosh Souparnika	R. Ganesh Kumar, Sruthi Lakshmi, Vijayaraghavan	Drama	
A U G U S T	22	Kerala Home Guards	Sajeev Kilikulam	Babu T.V., Sajeev Kilikulam, Angracious	Drama	
A U G U S T	29	Peruchazhi	Arun Vaidyanathan	Mohanlal, Ragini Nandwani, Mukesh, Baburaj	Satire	
A U G U S T	29	Veyilum Mazhayum	Shyju N.	Sudhir Karamana, Harikumar K.G., Anoop Chandran, Shobi Thilakan, VijayaKumari	Drama	
S E P T E M B E R	5	RajadhiRaja	Ajai Vasudev	Mammootty, Raai Laxmi, Lena, Siddique	Comedy/Action	
S E P T E M B E R	5	Bhaiyya Bhaiyya	Johny Antony	Kunchako Boban, Nisha Agarwal, Biju Menon, Suraj Venjaramoodu, Innocent	Comedy	
S E P T E M B E R	6	Sapthamashree Thaskaraha	Anil Radhakrishnan Menon	Prithviraj, Reenu Mathews, Sanusha, Asif Ali, Neeraj Madhav, Nedumudi Venu	Drama	
S E P T E M B E R	6	Villali Veeran	Sudheesh Shankar	Dileep, Namitha Pramod, Kalabhavan Shajon, Nedumudi Venu, Mythili	Comedy	
S E P T E M B E R	12	September 10, 1943	Muhammed Rafi	Sreekanth Menon	Patriotism	
S E P T E M B E R	19	Njaan	Ranjith	Dulquer Salmaan, Anumol, Sruthy Ramachandran, Suresh Krishna, Joy Mathew, Muthumani, Jyothi Krishna, Saiju Kurup	Drama	
S E P T E M B E R	19	Vellivelichathil	Madhu Kaithapram	Suraj Venjarammoodu, John Brittas, Iniya, Lalu Alex, Tini Tom, Sreejith Ravi, Raveendran, Sudheer Karamana	Drama	
S E P T E M B E R	19	Atharayirunnu	K P Khalid	Anand Kumar, Dr.Sudhi, Jincy	Drama	
S E P T E M B E R	25	Vellimoonga	Jibu Jacob	Biju Menon, Aju Varghese, Nikki Galrani	Comedy	
S E P T E M B E R	26	Money Ratnam	Santhosh Nair	Fahadh Faasil, Niveda Thomas	Comedy	
S E P T E M B E R	26	Central Theater	Kiran Narayanan	Hemanth Menon, Sidhartha Siva	Thriller	
O C T O B E R	3	Tamaar Padaar	Dileesh Nair	Prithviraj, Baburaj, Chemban Vinod, Srinda Ashab	Satirical comedy	
O C T O B E R	3	Homely Meals	Anoop Kannan	Vipin Atley, Srinda Ashab, Rajesh Sharma, Neeraj Madhav	Comedy	
O C T O B E R	10	100 Degree Celsius-Part 1	Rakesh Gopan	Shwetha Menon, Bhama, Meghana Raj, Ananya	Women Centric Thriller	
O C T O B E R	10	Asha Black	John Robinson	Arjun Lal, R. Sarathkumar, Manoj K. Jayan	Drama	
O C T O B E R	10	Maramkothi	Baby Thomas	Sreejith Ravi, Tini Tom, Indrans, Mamukkoya	Romance	
O C T O B E R	10	Nakshatrangal	Raju Chambakara	Sai Kumar, Maniyanpilla Raju, Ramesh Pisharadi, Sachin, Pinky	Drama	
O C T O B E R	10	Persiakaran	Alok R. Nath	Mukesh, Adil Ibrahim, Juby Ninan	Drama	
O C T O B E R	10	Ithihasa	Binu S	Shine Tom Chacko, Anusree, Balu	Comedy, Fantasy	
O C T O B E R	10	Study Tour	Thomas Benjamin	Kaushik Babu, Siddique, Sai Kumar, Praveena	Drama	
O C T O B E R	17	Mithram	Jaspal Shanmughan	Askar Saudan, Soorya Kiran, Gauri Krishna, Geetha Vijayan	Horror	
O C T O B E R	17	Nayana	K. N. Sasidharan	Anupam Kher, Miya, Baby Ankitha, Siddique, Jagadeesh, Kalpana, Prakash Barre	Drama	
O C T O B E R	17	Koottathil Oral	K. Padma Kumar	Siddique, Divya Darshan, Soja Jolly, Rajasri Nair	Drama	
O C T O B E R	17	Kurutham Kettavan	Shiju Cherupannoor	Harikrishnan, Shammi Thilakan, Anusree	Drama	
O C T O B E R	17	Hello Innu Onnam Theeyathiya	Sahadevan Iyyakkad	Sasi Kalinga, Vijayan Karanthoor, Purushu Kovoor	Drama	
O C T O B E R	30	Njangalude Veettile Athidhikal	Sibi Malayil	Jayaram, Priyamani, Kalabhavan Shajon, Narein, Lena	Family	
O C T O B E R	31	Pedithondan	Pradeep Chokli	Suraj Venjaramoodu, Anusree, Madhupal	Comedy, Drama	
O C T O B E R	31	Education Loan	Moni Sreenivasan	Jgadeesh, Indrans, Geetha Vijayan	Drama	
N O V E M B E R	6	Varsham	Ranjith Sankar	Mammootty, Asha Sarath, Mamta Mohandas, Govind Padmasoorya	Family	
N O V E M B E R	7	Iyobinte Pusthakam	Amal Neerad	Fahadh Faasil, Jayasurya, Lal, Padmapriya, Isha Sharvani, Jinu Joseph, Chemban Vinod Jose	Period Thriller	
N O V E M B E R	7	Little Superman	Vinayan	Praveena, Master Deny, Madhu, Baby Nayantara	Children's Film	
N O V E M B E R	14	Ormayundo Ee Mukham	Anwar Sadik	Vineeth Sreenivasan, Namitha Pramod, Aju Varghese, Lakshmi, Mukesh, Idavela Babu	Romantic Musical	
N O V E M B E R	14	Oru Korean Padam	Sujith S Nair	Maqbool Salmaan, Jwang-ki-Ju, Tini Tom, Mithra Kurian	Drama	
N O V E M B E R	14	Ottamandaram	Vinod Mankara	Bhama, Nedumudi Venu, Sajitha Madathil, Kochu Preman, Nandu	Drama	
N O V E M B E R	21	Lal Bahadur Shastri	Rejishh Midhila	Jayasurya, Aju Varghese, Nedumudi Venu, Lakshmipriya, Sandra Simson	Comedy	
N O V E M B E R	21	Mummyude Swantham Achoos	Raju Michael	Raju Michael, Devan, Renish, Urmila Unni, Jaffer Idukki	Drama	
N O V E M B E R	21	Odum Raja Aadum Rani	Viju Varma	Tini Tom, Manikandan Pattambi, Indrans, Sreelakshmi Sreekumar	Comedy	
N O V E M B E R	21	You Can Do	Nandakumar Kavil	Kalabhavan Haneefa, Vijayaraghavan, Indrans, Reena Bashir	Comedy	
N O V E M B E R	21	Neeharika	Saji Vaikom	Hema Shankar, Amal, Anjana, Kavya, Murali	Drama	
N O V E M B E R	22	The Dolphins	Diphan	Suresh Gopi, Anoop Menon, Meghana Raj, Nandu	Drama	
N O V E M B E R	28	Mylanchi Monchulla Veedu	Benny K. Joseph	Jayaram, Asif Ali, Kaniha, Meera Nandan, Madhu	Comedy drama	
N O V E M B E R	28	Angels	Jean Markose	Indrajith, Asha Sarath, Baiju	Mystery, Thriller	
N O V E M B E R	28	Mathai Kuzhappakkaranalla	Akku Akbar	Jayasurya, Bhama], Mukesh	Drama	
D E C E M B E R	5	Karanavar	Jahangir Shamz	Divya Darshan, Sreelakshmi, Mukesh, Rajendran, Kalabhavan Shajon, Sunil Sukhada, Chembil Asokan, Indrans, Kalpana	Drama	
D E C E M B E R	5	Actually	Shine Kurian	Hemanth Menon, Aju Varghese, Sreenivasan, Bhagath Manuel, Sneha Unnikrishnan	Drama	
D E C E M B E R	5	Seconds	Aneesh Upasana	Jayasurya, Vinayakan, Vinay Fort, Aparna Nair	Thriller	
D E C E M B E R	12	Colour Balloon	Subaash Thiruvilwmala	Tini Tom, Nandu, Jagadish, Vijayakumar, Praveena	Drama	
D E C E M B E R	19	Cousins	Vysakh	Kunchacko Boban, Indrajith Sukumaran, Vedhika, Nisha Aggarwal	Comedy	
D E C E M B E R	19	Aamayum Muyalum	Priyadarshan	Jayasurya, Piaa Bajpai, Harisree Ashokan, Innocent, Nedumudi Venu	Comedy	
D E C E M B E R	25	Nagara Varidhi Naduvil Njan	Shibu Balan	Sreenivasan, Sangeetha, Manoj K Jayan, Innocent	Comedy	
D E C E M B E R	25	8 : 20	Shyam Kumar	Arjun Nandakumar, Avantika Mohan, Bijukuttan, Jayakrishnan	Drama	
D E C E M B E R	25	Kalidasan Kavitha Ezhuthukayanu	Santhosh Pandit	Santhosh Pandit, Lakshmi, Jayasree, Sreedevi, Reshma	Drama	

== Dubbed films ==
Movies that were dubbed into Malayalam
Opening	Title	Director(s)	Original film	Cast	Ref.
