= List of Malayalam films of 2016 =

The tables list the Malayalam films released in theaters in the year 2016. Premiere shows and film festival screenings are not considered as releases for this list.

== Released films ==
Opening		Title	Director	Cast	Genre	Ref
J A N U A R Y	2	Marupuram	Bijoy P. I.	V. K. Baiju, Varun J. Thilak	Suspense	
J A N U A R Y	2	Style	Binu S.	Unni Mukundan, Tovino Thomas, Priyanka Kandwal	Romance	
J A N U A R Y	8	Maalgudi Days	Vinod, Vivek, Vishak	Anoop Menon, Bhama	Thriller	
J A N U A R Y	8	Aalroopangal	C. V. Premkumar	Nandu, Maya Viswanath	Drama	
J A N U A R Y	8	Yanam Mahayanam	Kannan Sooraj	Renjan, Anand Roshen, Divyan	Drama	
J A N U A R Y	15	Paavada	G. Marthandan	Prithviraj Sukumaran, Anoop Menon, Miya	Comedy Drama	
J A N U A R Y	15	Monsoon Mangoes	Abi Varghese	Fahadh Faasil, Vinay Forrt, Aishwarya Menon	Thriller	
J A N U A R Y	22	Kadhantharam	K. J. Bose	Nedumudi Venu, Rahul Madhav, Vishnupriya	Social Drama	
J A N U A R Y	22	2 Penkuttikal	Jeo Baby	Amala Paul, Tovino Thomas, Anju Kurian	Family	
J A N U A R Y	22	Aakasangalkkappuram	Dhanoj Nayak	Bharanikkavu Radhakrishnan, Aadharsh	Science, Motivational	
J A N U A R Y	22	Amoeba	Manoj Kana	Anumol, Aneesh G. Menon, Athmiya Rajan	Social Drama	
J A N U A R Y	29	Jalam	M. Padmakumar	Priyanka Nair, Prakash Bare	Social Drama	
J A N U A R Y	29	Pachakkallam	Prasanth Mambully	Maqbool Salmaan, Aqsa Bhatt, Riyaz Khan	Romantic Thriller	
F E B R U A R Y	4	Action Hero Biju	Abrid Shine	Nivin Pauly, Anu Emmanuel	Social Drama, Comedy	
F E B R U A R Y	5	Sukhamayirikkatte	Rejee Prabhakaran	Vineeth, Siddique, Archana Kavi	Drama	
F E B R U A R Y	5	Maheshinte Prathikaaram	Dileesh Pothan	Fahadh Faasil, Anusree, Soubin Shahir	Comedy, Drama	
F E B R U A R Y	12	Puthiya Niyamam	A. K. Sajan	Mammootty, Nayanthara, Aju Varghese	Suspense	
F E B R U A R Y	12	Kattumakkan	Shalil Kalloor	Mukesh, Nassar	Drama	
F E B R U A R Y	19	Hello Namasthe	Jayan K. Nair	Vinay Forrt, Sanju Sivram, Bhavana, Miya	Comedy	
F E B R U A R Y	19	AakashVaani	Khayes Milan	Kavya Madhavan, Vijay Babu	Drama	
F E B R U A R Y	19	Out of Range	Johnson V. Devassy	Askar Ali, Vishnu Unnikrishnan, Sumith Samudra, Ajayaghosh, Swathy, Nila Raj, Anjali Aneesh Upasana	Drama	
F E B R U A R Y	26	Vettah	Rajesh Pillai	Manju Warrier, Indrajith Sukumaran, Kunchacko Boban	Suspense Thriller	
F E B R U A R Y	26	Sahapadi 1975	John Ditto P. R.	Vineeth Kumar, Meera Vasudevan, Manoj K. Jayan	Thriller	
M A R C H	4	Chennai Koottam	Lohith Madhav	Sreejith Vijay, Sinil Sainuddin	Comedy	
M A R C H	4	Kolamass	Sanoop Anil	Ashkar Soudan, Ameer Niyas, Manoj K. Jayan	Thriller	
M A R C H	4	Smart Boys	M. R. Anoop Raj	Jagadeesh, Kochu Preman, Juby Ninan	Action	
M A R C H	4	Appuram Bengal Ippuram Thiruvithamkoor	Sennan Pallassery	Maqbool Salmaan, Ansiba Hassan, Shammi Thilakan	Comedy	
M A R C H	4	Noolpaalam	Sinto Sunny	Mala Aravindan, T. G. Ravi, M. R. Gopakumar	Drama	
M A R C H	18	Darvinte Parinamam	Jijo Antony	Prithviraj Sukumaran, Chandini Sreedharan, Chemban Vinod Jose	Comedy	
M A R C H	18	Mohavalayam	T. V. Chandran	Joy Mathew, Mythili, Renji Panicker	Thriller	
M A R C H	18	Moonam Naal Njyayarazhcha	T. A. Razzaq	Salim Kumar, Babu Antony, Jyothi Krishna	Social Drama	
M A R C H	18	Ithu Thaanda Police	Manoj Palodan	Asif Ali, Abhirami, Janani Iyer	Drama	
M A R C H	25	Sambar	Navas Kallara	Shivaji Guruvayoor, Venu Madhav	Drama	
M A R C H	26	Kali	Sameer Thahir	Dulquer Salmaan, Sai Pallavi	Romance, Thriller	
A P R I L	1	Maanasaandarapetta Yezdi	Arun Omana Sadanandan	P. Balachandran, Jayan Cherthala, Indrans	Comedy	
A P R I L	2	King Liar	Lal	Dileep, Madonna Sebastian, Lal, Rithu Manthra	Comedy	
A P R I L	8	Jacobinte Swargarajyam	Vineeth Sreenivasan	Nivin Pauly, Renji Panicker, Sreenath Bhasi	Family, Drama	
A P R I L	8	Yathra Chodikkathe	Aneesh Varma	Kalabhavan Mani, Reena Basheer, Sadiq	Drama	
A P R I L	8	mayamalika	satheesh poduval	Sreenivasan, nedumudi, swetha	clasic	
A P R I L	22	Leela	Ranjith	Biju Menon, Parvathy Nambiar	Drama	
A P R I L	29	Shikhamani	Vinod Guruvayoor	Chemban Vinod Jose, Mrudula Murali	Thriller	
A P R I L	29	Edavappathy	Lenin Rajendran	Sidharth Lama, Manisha Koirala, Uthara Unni	Drama	
A P R I L	29	Arani	Raa Prasad	Pradeep Mekkara, Madhu Master, Nandu Krishnan	Drama	
M A Y	5	James & Alice	Sujith Vasudev	Prithviraj Sukumaran, Vedhika, Sai Kumar	Romance, Thriller, Drama	
M A Y	12	Valleem Thetti Pulleem Thetti	Rishi Sivakumar	Kunchacko Boban, Shamili, Manoj K. Jayan	Comedy, Romance	
M A Y	13	Mudhugauv	Vipin Das	Gokul Suresh, Arthana Binu	Comedy, Romance	
M A Y	13	Dhanayaathra	Gireesh Kunnummal	Shweta Menon, Riyaz Khan	Drama	
M A Y	20	Happy Wedding	Omar	Siju Wilson, Soubin Shahir, Sharaf U Dheen, Anu Sithara	Comedy	
M A Y	20	Aadupuliyattam	Kannan Thamarakkulam	Jayaram, Ramya Krishnan	Horror, Thriller	
M A Y	20	Kammatipaadam	Rajeev Ravi	Dulquer Salman, Vinayakan, Manikandan	Action	
M A Y	20	Hallelooya	Sudhi Aanna	Narain, Meghna Raj	Drama	
M A Y	27	School Bus	Rosshan Andrrews	Kunchacko Boban, Jayasurya, Aparna Gopinath	Drama	
M A Y	27	Oru Murai Vanthu Parthaya	Sajan K. Mathew	Unni Mukundan, Prayaga Martin, Sanusha	Drama	
J U N E	3	Angane Thanne Nethave Anjettennam Pinnale	Anil Poojappura	Narain, Meera Nandan	Political Satire	
J U N E	3	Ghost Villa	Mahesh Kesav	John Jacob, Parvathy Nambiar, Kottayam Nazeer	Horror	
J U N E	3	Poyi Maranju Parayaathe	Martin Joseph	Kalabhavan Mani, Vimala Raman, Maqbool Salmaan	Social Drama	
J U N E	10	Tintumon Enna Kodeeswaran	Santhosh Pandit	Santhosh Pandit	Comedy	
J U N E	17	Ozhivudivasathe Kali	Sanal Kumar Sasidharan	Nistar Ahamed, Abhija Sivakala, Arun Nayar	Drama	
J U N E	17	Anyarku Praveshanamilla	V. S. Jayakrishna	Tini Tom, Suraj Venjaramoodu, Aditi Rai	Comedy	
J U N E	24	Aneezya	Arjun Binu	Sreeya Ramesh, Jagadish, Bijukuttan, Suraj Venjaramoodu	Drama	
J U N E	24	Varna Vasanthangal	Padmakrishnan K Thrikkariyoor	Anjali Remesh, Siddharth Prakash, Babu Raj	Drama	
J U N E	24	Calling Bell	Kollam Ajith	Kollam Ajith, Shalu Kuryan, Devan, Kalabhavan Shajon	Drama	
J U N E	24	Kandethal	M. Sukumarji	Geetha Poduval, Sunil Raghavan, Sandeep Sreedhar	Drama	
J U L Y	6	Karinkunnam 6's	Deepu Karunakaran	Manju Warrier, Anoop Menon	Sports Drama	
J U L Y	6	Shajahanum Pareekuttiyum	Boban Samuel	Kunchacko Boban, Jayasurya, Amala Paul	Romance, Thriller	
J U L Y	7	Kasaba	Nitin Renji Panicker	Mammootty, Varalaxmi Sarathkumar, Neha Saxena	Action	
J U L Y	7	Anuraga Karikkin Vellam	Khalid Rahman	Biju Menon, Asif Ali, Rajisha Vijayan, Asha Sarath	Drama	
J U L Y	22	Pa..Va	Suraj Tom	Anoop Menon, Murali Gopy, Renji Panicker	Drama	
J U L Y	29	White	Uday Ananthan	Mammootty, Huma Qureshi	Romance	
J U L Y	29	Kismath	Shanavas K. Bavakkutty	Shane Nigam, Shruthy Menon, Vinay Forrt	Romance	
J U L Y	29	Real Fighter	Jesson Joseph	Riju Noushad Khan, Biju Sabinam, Sajeesh Attingal	Action	
A U G U S T	5	Guppy	John Paul George	Master Chetan, Tovino Thomas, Sreenivasan	Drama	
A U G U S T	5	Annmariya Kalippilaanu	Midhun Manuel Thomas	Sunny Wayne, Aju Varghese, Sara Arjun	Comedy, Drama	
A U G U S T	12	Pretham	Ranjith Sankar	Jayasurya, Govind Padmasoorya, Aju Varghese	Horror	
A U G U S T	12	Inspector Dawood Ibrahim	Sajid Yahiya	Jayasurya, Sshivada	Action	
A U G U S T	12	Marubhoomiyile Aana	V. K. Prakash	Biju Menon, Krishnashankar, Samskruti Shenoy	Comedy	
A U G U S T	18	Pinneyum	Adoor Gopalakrishnan	Dileep, Kavya Madhavan, Nedumudi Venu	Drama	
A U G U S T	19	Dooram	Manu Kannamthanam	Maqbool Salmaan, Shine Tom Chacko, Archana Kavi	Drama	
A U G U S T	26	Lbw : Love, Breakup and War	B. N. Shajeer Sha	Deepu Chriz, Shabeer B. N., Musthafa, S. P. Sreekumar, Pramod Das, Ekhtha Sidharth, Neethu Lal, Vandhana	Romantic Comedy Drama	
A U G U S T	26	Appooppanthadi	Manusankar	Meghanathan	Drama	
A U G U S T	26	Shyam	Sebastian Maliyekkal	Rahul Madhav, Bhagath Manuel, Aparna Bajpai	Drama	
A U G U S T	26	Pop Corn	Aneesh Upasana	Shine Tom Chacko, Srinda Ashab, Soubin Shahir	Comedy	
A U G U S T	26	Dum	Anuram	Lal, Shine Tom Chacko, Shritha Sivadas	Action	
A U G U S T	26	Madmasa	Jayan Raj	Pranav, Agni Theerth, Abhinanth	Drama	
A U G U S T	26	168 Hours	K. G. Vijayakumar	Manu Mohit, Anju Nair	Horror	
A U G U S T	26	Chinna Dada	Raju Champakkara	Riyaz Khan	Thriller	
S E P T E M B E R	3	Vikalpam	Radhakrishnan Pallath	Krishnendu, Kishore, Ashwin, Abhilash	Drama	
S E P T E M B E R	3	Vanyam	Sohan Seenulal	Aparna Nair	Crime, Thriller	
S E P T E M B E R	3	Zoom	Anish Varma	Bhagath Manuel	Thriller	
S E P T E M B E R	3	Mohanjodaro Aarappa?	Anoop Daiva	Abhimanyu, Jobi Pala, Selvaraj, Kalyani Nair	Comedy	
S E P T E M B E R	8	Oozham	Jeethu Joseph	Prithviraj Sukumaran, Divya Pillai, Neeraj Madhav	Thriller	
S E P T E M B E R	8	Oppam	Priyadarshan	Mohanlal, Vimala Raman, Anusree, Samuthirakani	Thriller	
S E P T E M B E R	9	Kochavva Paulo Ayyappa Coelho	Sidhartha Siva	Kunchacko Boban, Anusree	Comedy, Drama	
S E P T E M B E R	10	Welcome to Central Jail	Sundar Das	Dileep, Vedhika, Siddique, Renji Panicker	Comedy	
S E P T E M B E R	14	Oru Muthassi Gadha	Jude Anthany Joseph	Rajini Chandy, Bhagyalakshmi, Suraj Venjaramoodu, Aparna Balamurali	Comedy	
S E P T E M B E R	23	Ottakolam	Jayan K. Saaj	Santhosh Keezhattoor, Biju Babu, Hima Shankar Sheematty	Drama	
S E P T E M B E R	30	Olappeeppi	Krish Kaimal	Biju Menon, Paris Lakshmi, Sreejith Ravi	Drama	
S E P T E M B E R	30	Koppayile Kodunkattu	Sojan Joseph	Sidharth Bharathan, Parvathy Nair, Shine Tom Chacko	Drama	
S E P T E M B E R	30	Adam	Zamar	Zamar	Thriller	
O C T O B E R	7	Pulimurugan	Vysakh	Mohanlal, Kamalini Mukherjee, Jagapati Babu, Lal, Vinu Mohan, Bala, Suraj Venjaramoodu	Action	
O C T O B E R	7	Thoppil Joppan	Johny Antony	Mammootty, Mamta Mohandas, Andrea Jeremiah	Comedy	
O C T O B E R	8	Kavi Uddheshichathu..?	Liju Thomas	Biju Menon, Asif Ali, Narain	Comedy	
O C T O B E R	16	Oru Bilathi Pranayam	Canatious Athipozhiyil	Jerin Joy, Leteshia Kuncheria	Comedy Romance Action Thriller	
O C T O B E R	21	Aanandam	Ganesh Raj	Thomas Mathew, Anu Antony, Arun Kurian, Siddhi Mahajankatti, Roshan Mathew, Anarkali Marikar, Vishak Nair	Campus drama	
O C T O B E R	21	Daffedar	John Esthappan	Tini Tom, Malavika	Drama	
O C T O B E R	28	Athijeevanam	S V Sajeevan	Sudheesh, Anju Aravind, Babu Annoor	Drama	
O C T O B E R	28	The Lovers	Shyju Ruby	Kalyani Nair, Spadikam George, Lishoy, Godfrey	Romance	
N O V E M B E R	4	Kolumittayi	Arun Viswam, Abhijith Asokan	Master Gaurav Menon, Baby Meenakshi	Children drama	
N O V E M B E R	4	Swarna Kaduva	Jose Thomas	Biju Menon, Innocent, Iniya	Comedy, Drama	
N O V E M B E R	4	Girls	Thulasidas	Archana Suseelan, Nadhiya, Ineya, Neena Kurup	Horror	
N O V E M B E R	11	Pallikkoodam	Gireesh P C	Anjali Aneesh, Sudheer Karamana	Drama	
N O V E M B E R	11	Mundrothuruth	Manu	Indrans, Vava Kottarakkara	Drama	
N O V E M B E R	11	Elektra	Shyamaprasad	Nayanthara, Manisha Koirala, Prakash Raj	Psychological Thriller	
N O V E M B E R	18	Kattappanayile Rithwik Roshan	Nadirshah	Vishnu Unnikrishnan, Prayaga Martin, Dharmajan Bolgatty, Siddique, Salim Kumar	Comedy, Thriller	
N O V E M B E R	25	10 Kalpanakal	Don Max	Anoop Menon, Meera Jasmine, Prashant Narayanan	Thriller	
N O V E M B E R	25	Sivapuram	Unni Pranav	Bala, Dhanya Mary Varghese, Indrans, Kalasala Babu, Saiju Kurup	Drama	
D E C E M B E R	2	Ore Mukham	Sajith Jagadnandan	Dhyan Sreenivasan, Jewel Mary, Chemban Vinod Jose	Campus thriller	
D E C E M B E R	2	Kuttikalundu Sookshikkuka	Kalavoor Ravikumar	Anoop Menon, Anumol, Bhavana, Sanoop Santhosh	Family drama	
D E C E M B E R	2	Buddhanum Chaplinum Chirikkunnu	R. Sarath	Indrans, Praveena, Nedumudi Venu, P. Balachandran	Family drama	
D E C E M B E R	2	Campus Diary	Jeevan Das	Sudev Nair, Gauthami Nair, V. S. Achuthanandan, Anu Sithara	Campus drama	
D E C E M B E R	9	Kappiri Thuruthu	Saheer Ali	Adil Ibrahim, Pearle Maaney	Period drama	
D E C E M B E R	9	Marupadi	V M Vinu	Rahman, Bhama, Anu Sithara	Family	
D E C E M B E R	9	Romanov	M. G. Sajeevan	Harikrishnan, Navami Khayik, Tini Tom	Romance	
D E C E M B E R	9	Paulettante Veedu	Dileep Narayanan	Sai Kumar, Amal Unnithan	Family	
D E C E M B E R	9	Neelima Nalla Kuttiyanu V/s Chiranjeevi IPS	Santhosh Pandit	Santhosh Pandit	Comedy	

== Dubbed films ==
Movies that are dubbed into Malayalam
Opening	Title	Director(s)	Original film		Cast	Ref.
Opening	Title	Director(s)	Film	Language	Cast	Ref.
4 March	Wow What a Love	Sujit Guha	Mon Je Kore Uru Uru	Bengali	Hiran Chatterjee, Koel Mallick	
11 March	Mr. Perfect'	K. Dasarath	Mr. Perfect	Telugu	Prabhas, Kajal Aggarwal	
27 May	Yodhavu	Boyapati Srinu	Sarrainodu	Telugu	Allu Arjun, Rakul Preet Singh	
17 June	Lens	Jayaprakash Radhakrishnan	Lens	English; Tamil	Anand Sami, Jayaprakash Radhakrishnan, Vinutha Lal	
5 August	Vismayam"	Chandra Shekar Yelati	Manamantha	Telugu	Mohanlal, Chandra Mohan, Vennela Kishore	
26 August	Porali	A. Karunakaran	Darling	Telugu	Prabhas, Kajal Aggarwal	
1 September	Janatha Garage	Koratala Siva	Janatha Garage	Telugu	Mohanlal, Nandamuri Taraka Rama Rao Jr.	

== Notable deaths ==
Celebrities who died during the year
Month	Date	Name	Age	Profession	Notable films
January	4	Sudhakaran	72	Actor	Samoohyapaadam • Ain • Sadayam •
January	8	M O Joseph	87	Producer	Ponni • Vaazhve Maayam • Aranazhika Neram •
January	11	VR Gopalakrishnan	60	Director, Screenwriter	Vandanam • Kakkathollayiram • Cheppu •
January	25	Kalpana	50	Actress	Charlie • Bangalore Days • Thanichalla Njan • Spirit • Kabooliwala • Pokkuveyil • CID Unnikrishnan • ABCD: American-Born Confused Desi
January	30	Kollam G. K. Pillai	85	Actor	Masappadi Mathupilla • My Dear Kuttichathan
January	30	T. N. Gopakumar	58	Director, Actor	Jeevan Masai
February	3	Mani Shornur	71	Screenplay/Story	Kottaram Veettile Appoottan • Rajadhani • Devaraagam
February	6	Shan Johnson	29	Singer/ Musician	My Name is John • Praise the Lord • Thira
February	13	O. N. V. Kurup	84	Poet, Lyricist	Vaishali • Pazhassi Raja • Pranayam • Meghamalhar • Gulmohar • Panchagni • Aakashadoothu • Midhunam' • Oru Sayanathinte Swapnam
February	14	Anandakkuttan	62	Cinematographer	Bharatham • His Highness Abdullah • Punjabi House • Kamaladalam • Aniathipravu • Paavakkoothu •Sadayam • Chronic Bachelor
February	15	Rajamani	60	Music Director, Actor	Nulli Novikkathe • Ekalavyan • Hide N' Seek • Narasimham (Background Music) • Aaraam Thampuran (Background Music) • Gulmohar (Actor)
February	27	Rajesh Pillai	42	Director	Traffic (2011) • Hridayathil Sookshikkan • Mili • Traffic (2014) • Vettah
March	1	Mohanroop	53	Director, Screenplay	Nulli Novikkathe • Vetta • Excuse Me Ethu Collegila
March	4	Nandan Kavil	46	Director	Mazhanool Kanavu • Avan (2010 film) • Eranaadinte Porali
March	6	Kalabhavan Mani	45	Actor, Singer	Vasantiyum Lakshmiyum Pinne Njanum • Sallapam • Chotta Mumbai • Adaminte Makan Abu • My Dear Kuttichathan • Karumadikuttan • My Dear Karadi • Ben Johnson • Nasrani • Lokanathan IAS • Chacko Randaaman • Careebeyans • Vettam • Aandavan • Priyappetta Nattukare • The Filmstaar • Indrajith • Payum Puli • Kabadi Kabadi • Rakshasa Rajavu • Akashathile Paravakal • Shikkar • Valkannadi • Black Stallion • Rakshakan • Summer in Bethlehem • Maanikyan • MLA Mani: Patham Classum Gusthiyum
March	8	Saji Paravoor	48	Director	Janakan
March	24	V. D. Rajappan	66	Actor, Singer	Meleparambil Aanveedu • Mutharamkunnu P.O. • Sandhyakku Virinja Poovu • Kuyiline Thedi
March	25	Jishnu Raghavan	35	Actor	Nammal • Ustad Hotel • Nerariyan CBI • Ordinary • Banking Hours 10 to 4 • Rebecca Uthup Kizhakkemala • Annum Innum Ennum • Chakkara Muthu
March	30	Babu Bharadwaj	68	Lyricist, Producer	Anyar • Iniyum Marichittillatha Nammal
April	25	Ajay Krishnan	28	Producer	Avarude Raavukal
April	17	R Govinda Pillai (Kochaniyan)	72	Actor	Karyam Nissaram • Prasnam Gurutharam • Samooham • Pakshe
May	2	Manoj Krishnan	45	Singer	Sudha Madhalam • Thirakalkkappuram • Sopanam
May	2	Mannar Radhakrishan	69	Actor	Spadikam • Thalavattam • Sandhyakku Virinja Poovu
May	29	Mathew Mattam	65	Writer	Karimbu • May Dinam
June	26	Kavalam Narayana Panicker	88	Lyricist, Musician, Singer	Thambu • Kummaatti • Ottaal • Amen
July	27	Vakkom Mohan	56	Dubbing Artist, Actor	Around 500 films
August	8	Jyothi Lakshmi	63	Actress	Murappennu • Kunjali Marakkar • Alibabayum 41 Kallanmaarum • Thadavara
August	11	Sagar Shiyas	50	Actor	Manjadikuru • Bangalore Days • Amar Akbar Anthony
August	10	Sasi Shanker	58	Director	Naaraayam • Guru Sishyan • Kunjikoonan
August	15	T. A. Razzaq	58	Writer	Vishnulokam • Sneham • Saaphalyam • Naadody
October	7	Sreelatha Menon	51	Actress	Perumthachan
November	12	Rekha Mohan	45	Actress	Udhyanapalakan • Oru Yathramozhi • Nee Varuvolam
November	22	M. Balamuralikrishna	86	Singer	Kodungallooramma • Ente Mohangal Poovaninju • Swathi Thirunal • Bharatham
December	5	Jayalalithaa	68	Actress	Jesus
December	20	Jagannatha Varma	77	Actor	New Delhi • Oru CBI Diary Kurippu • Pathram• Dolls
