= Pradeep Kottayam =

Indian film actor (1961–2022)

- Born: Pradeep K. R. 1961; Kottayam, Kerala, India
- Died: 17 February 2022 (aged 61); Kottayam, Kerala
- Occupations: Actor; LIC officer
- Years active: 2001–2022
- Spouse: Maya
- Children: 2

Pradeep K. R. (1961 – 17 February 2022), professionally credited as Pradeep Kottayam, was an Indian actor who primarily worked in Malayalam films and some Tamil films. He is best known for his comedic roles. His role in the 2010 Tamil film Vinnaithaandi Varuvaayaa gave him a breakthrough after a dialogue received public attention.

== Career ==
Pradeep Kottayam started his acting career in 2001 with the film Ee Naadu Innale Vare, directed by I. V. Sasi. In his early stages of his career, he worked as a junior artist, appearing in mainly non speaking roles and uncredited roles. He has appeared in many movies including Rajamanikyam and 2 Harihar Nagar as a bystander in crowd scenes or a non-speaking role. He got a breakthrough in Gautham Vasudev Menon's hit film Vinnaithaandi Varuvaayaa, he had the role of the uncle of heroine Trisha, which was well noticed. His dialogue in the movie "karimeen undu...fish undu...mutton undu..." (transl. we have karimeen, fish and mutton) became famous in the industry.

His best known works include Aadu Oru Bheegara Jeevi Aanu, Oru Vadakkan Selfie, Life of Josutty, Kunjiramayanam, Welcome to Central Jail, Amar Akbar Antony, Adi Kapyare Kootamani and Kattappanayile Rithwik Roshan. He is known for his special style of rendering dialogues. Mostly, he played comedy, supporting and cameo roles. Pradeep also won the Best Supporting Actor for various roles at 2nd Asianet Comedy Awards 2016. He last acted in Aaraattu starring Mohanlal and directed by B. Unnikrishnan.

== Personal life ==
Pradeep was married to Maya. The couple has two children. He died from heart attack at a private hospital in Kottayam on 17 February 2022, at age 61.

== Filmography ==
Key
†	Denotes film or TV productions that have not yet been released

=== Malayalam films ===
List of Malayalam films and roles
Year	Title	Role	Notes
2001	Ee Naadu Innale Vare		
2002	Kalyanaraman		
2003	Chakram		
2004	Kanninum Kannadikkum		
2004	Mampazhakkalam		
2004	4 The People		
2005	Rajamanikyam		
2008	Twenty:20		Uncredited
2008	Lollipop		
2009	2 Harihar Nagar	Hotel Bearer	
2009	Kerala Cafe	Person in the cafe	
2009	My Big Father		
2009	Colours		
2010	Electra	Man in the cemetery	
2012	Cobra	Audience member	
2012	Thattathin Marayathu	Shaju, police constable	
2012	Chumma	Anand's father	Serial on Amrita TV
2012	Banking Hours 10 to 4	Police Constable	
2012	Matinee		
2013	Amen	Police Officer	
2013	5 Sundarikal	Police Constable	
2013	Honey Bee	Bevco Man	
2013	Philips and the Monkey Pen	Pavithran Sir	
2014	Manja		
2014	Naku Penta Naku Taka	Sridharan	
2014	Bhaiyya Bhaiyya	Registrar	
2014	Lal Bahadur Shastri	Thara's father	
2014	Ithihasa	Aloor Uncle	
2014	Oru Korean Padam		
2015	Aadu Oru Bheegara Jeevi Aanu	Head Constable	
2015	The Reporter	Chittappan	
2015	Oru Vadakkan Selfie	Shaji's father	
2015	Ennum Eppozhum	Canteen Supplier	
2015	Reporter	Chittappan	
2015	Oru Second Class Yathra	Joppan	
2015	KL 10 Patthu	Registrar	
2015	Acha Dhin	CCTV Operator	
2015	Namasthe Bali		
2015	Thinkal Muthal Velli Vare	Himself	
2015	Viswasam Athalle Ellam	Solomon	
2015	Utopiayile Rajavu	Poornachandran	
2015	Jamna Pyari	Radhika's father	
2015	Kunjiramayanam	Beverages Employee	
2015	Life of Josutty	Josutty's Uncle	
2015	Urumbukal Urangarilla	Sulu's husband	
2015	Kohinoor	Karunakaran	
2015	Amar Akbar Antony	Chakappan	
2015	Salt Mango Tree	Shameer	
2015	Adi Kapyare Kootamani	Bhanu's Relative	
2015	ATM	SI	
2016	Appuram Bengal Ippuram Thiruvithamkoor		
2016	Kadhantharam	Elias	
2016	Puthiya Niyamam	Thalathil Sreenivasan	
2016	Hello Namasthe	Mohanan	
2016	Ithu Thaanda Police	Rasheed	
2016	Darvinte Parinamam	Parthan	
2016	Shikhamani		
2016	Mudhugauv	Doctor	
2016	Aadupuliyattam	Kunji Narayanan	
2016	Karinkunnam 6S	Coach	
2016	Anyarku Praveshanamilla	Director Ittikandom	
2016	Welcome to Central Jail	Shivan	
2016	Kattappanayile Rithwik Roshan	Dasappan's father	
2016	Kavi Uddheshichathu..?	Broker Kunjose	
2016	Aanandam	Professor Kanjikuzhi	
2016	Ore Mukham	Librarian	
2017	Godha	Captain's Brother And Cook	
2017	Cappuccino		
2017	Oru Visheshapetta Biriyani Kissa	Mathew	
2017	Sunday Holiday	Church visitor	
2018	Daivame Kaithozham K. Kumar Akanam	Maydathan	
2018	Kalyanam	Aravindan	
2018	Kamuki	Principal	
2018	Mohan Lal	Sethu's uncle	
2018	Suvarna Purushan	Vijayan	
2018	Laughing Apartment Near Girinagar		
2018	Padayottam		
2019	Janaadhipan	Sivadasan	
2019	A for Apple		
2019	Oru Adar Love	Principal's Secretary	
2020	2 States		
2020	Paapam Cheyyathavar Kalleriyatte		
2021	Pappantem Simontem Piller		
2022	Aaraattu	Krishnan	Posthumous film
2022	Mathangi	Panchayath Madhavan	Posthumous film
2022	12th Man	Sidharth's uncle	Posthumous film voice-over only
2022	Kuri	Babu C.K.	Posthumous film Guest Appearance
2023	Bullet Diaries		Posthumous film
2023	Mothathi Kozhappa	Moneylender	Posthumous film
2024	Manorathangal		Posthumous release Segment: "Swargam Thurakkuna Samayam"
2025	Nancy Rani		Posthumous film
2026	Christina		

=== Other language films ===
List of other language films and roles
Year	Title	Role	Language	Notes
2010	Vinnaithaandi Varuvaayaa	George	Tamil	
2010	Ye Maaya Chesave	George	Telugu	
2012	Ekk Deewana Tha	George	Hindi	
2013	Raja Rani	Nivitha's father	Tamil	
2013	Mathapoo	Restaurant Worker	Tamil	
2015	Nanbenda	Tea Shop Owner	Tamil	
2016	Theri	Police Constable	Tamil	
2017	Konjam Konjam	Bruno	Tamil	
2022	Veetla Vishesham	Bijulal	Tamil	Posthumous film
