= Masterpiece (2017 film) =

2017 film by Ajay Vasudev

- Theatrical release poster
- Directed by: Ajai Vasudev
- Written by: Udaykrishna
- Produced by: C. H. Muhammed
- Starring: Mammootty; Unni Mukundan; Kalabhavan Shajohn; Varalaxmi Sarathkumar; Mukesh; Maqbool Salmaan; John Kaippallil
- Cinematography: Vinod Illampally
- Edited by: Johnkutty
- Music by: Deepak Dev
- Production company: Royal Cinemas
- Distributed by: U. K. Studios
- Release date: 21 December 2017
- Running time: 160 minutes
- Country: India
- Language: Malayalam

Masterpiece is a 2017 Indian Malayalam-language action comedy crime thriller film directed by Ajai Vasudev and written by Udayakrishna. It stars Mammootty in the lead role, alongside Unni Mukundan, Kalabhavan Shajohn, Mukesh, Varalaxmi Sarathkumar, Maqbool Salmaan and John Kaippallil.

Principal photography began on 17 April 2017 at the Fatima Mata National College, Kollam and was completed by the end of November in Kochi. Deepak Dev composed the music for the film, while the cinematography and editing were handled by Vinod Illampally and Johnkutty.

Masterpiece was released on 21 December 2017, received mixed reviews from critics and became a commercial success at the box office.

== Plot ==
In Travancore Maharaja's College, two students' groups named Real Fighters, whose leader is Mahesh Raj and Royal Warriors whose leader is Roshan Cherian quarrel over various issues. During a conversation in the canteen, the canteen incharge Mani tells the Real Fighters about Vedhika's performance in Mother's College and then he also informs the Royal Warriors about the same. The both group in disguise arrive at Mother's College to meet Vedhika and propose her but she already had an fallen for Unnikrishnan, who was her music teacher Balan's son and also a senior of hers with whom she had a flashback. Unnikrishnan also happens to be a student of the Travancore College and Member of Real Fighters. He receives a call from Vedhika asking him to come to meet her at railway station at 11:30pm .The Real Fighters support Unnikrishnan to confess his love to Vedhika and gives him ring and the key of a colleague's bike. Mani mixes alcohol in their drink, unaware of it Unnikrishnan drinks and is caught by the police and is taken to the custody although he is released later without pressing any charges. The next day, Reji finds Vedhika's corpse behind the men's hostel of the college. Her father Sivanandhan urges the police to find the killer.

The team under ACP John Thekkan starts the investigation. Later, the investigation leads to Unnikrishnan, who received the last phone call from Vedhika before her death. Thekkan arrests Unnikrishnan forcefully and questions him. Later Unnikrishnan is found dead inside the police interrogation room. This leads to a quarrel between the police and the students in which Thekken gets seriously injured and hospitalised. In his absence, the investigation is handed over to ACP Bhavani Durga and her team. Bhavani orders to arrest Roshan. This is because according to an evidence the murderer is observed to be nearly 6-ft tall and Roshan has a similar physique. This leads to yet another dispute between the police and the campus and the police is prevented by the Home minister from entering the campus. At the same time, a person named Edward Livingston joins the college as the new professor in English Literature. Professor Cherian, who is the college vice principal and also Roshan's father talks to Edward about his life as a divorcee. He tells Eddy that Roshan is innocent as he was at his mother's house at the night the murder happened. In a meeting between the police and campus, Edward talks to the officials that the students are not responsible for the murder and also that the police is responsible for Unnikrishnan's death.

After few days, Shivanandan sends his goons to the college so that the suspected students can be handed over to police. But Edward intervenes and thrashes the goons. He also unites Real Fighters and Royal Warriors and fight the goons together. Later, Edward notices that the new men who were appointed as workers in various department fields were actually police officers. He warns the students not to leave the campus at any cost. Despite his warning, Roshan, Mahesh and a colleague leave to a wedding reception to meet Mahesh's girlfriend Ramlath where they are spotted by a suspended police officer Ramachandran. Thekkan, who is back on duty apprehends them and gets hold of Roshan, while his friends escape. Roshan is taken to a hideout, but Edward and team tracks them and saves Roshan.

Edward and the students promise to the police and media that they will find out the murderers of Vedhika and Unnikrishnan within 10 days. Edward asks Roshan to reunite his parents who have been separated for 3 years, which he does. Mahesh tells the team that Ramlath is being forced by her family for an alliance which she doesn't like. He goes to meet Ramlath, but is arrested by police and Ramlath is taken to custody by Ramachandran. Ramlath is forcefully taken to his guest house where Edward saves her by defeating Ramachandran. And the next day, Edward reveals to the press that he found the culprit and takes Ramachandran to the media where he reveals that he did all these for Thekkan leaving everybody astonished. He reveals that it was Thekkan, who murdered Vedhika and later instructed Ramachandran to murder Unnikrishnan.

Thekkan had a grudge against Vedhika as Ramlath who is Vedhika's close friend, discovered John's illegal relationship with Minister Seethalakshmi, who is the wife of a deceased politician Krishnadas. It is revealed that Krishnadas was murdered by Thekkan and Ramachandran when he found out his wife's extramarital relationship with Thekkan, who was raised by Krishnadas. Ramlath who understood all these informed Vedhika about the same and Vedhika, who wanted to inform Unnikrishnan about the incident was kidnapped and raped to death by Thekkan and Ramachandran. Unnikrishnan was arrested on purpose and was killed as Thekkan understood Unnikrishnan had known certain facts about Vedhika's death. After Ramachandran reveals all these to the public, he is shot and killed by Thekkan who tries to escape, but Edward overpowers and kills Thekkan with his pistol, thereby avenging Vedhika's and Unnikrishnan's death while Seethalakshmi gets arrested.

Later, Cherian along with Roshan and Mahesh and other students protest outside the police station to leave Edward. However, they are shocked to see the other person in the same name. Cherian and students learn that the Edward, who was with them is an IPS officer named Anto Antony from the Central Home Department and also that the police disguised as workers in the college, were actually his teammates.

== Cast ==
- Mammootty as Prof. Edward Livingston (fake) / DIG Anto Antony IPS - SIT
- Unni Mukundan as ACP John Thekkan IPS, the main antagonist
- Mukesh as Cherian Philip, Vice Principal
- Maqbool Salmaan as Mahesh Raman
- John Kaipallil as Roshan Cherian
- Kalabhavan Shajohn as SI Ramachandran, the secondary antagonist
- Varalaxmi Sarathkumar as ACP Bhavani Durga IPS
- Poonam Bajwa as Smitha, a lecturer aka Sunny Leone
- Gokul Suresh as Unnikrishan, Vedhika's lover
- Mahima Nambiar as Vedhika Shivanadan
- Lena as Education Minister Seethalakshmi Krishnadas
- Santhosh Pandit as Peon Sankarankutty
- Nandu as Balan Master, Unnikrishnan's father
- Manju Satheesh as Lekshmi, Unnikrishnan's mother
- Kailash as CI Raja Ravi Varma
- Arjun Nandhakumar as Gokul Das
- Divyadarshan as Deepan
- Aswin Menon as College Student
- Sunil Sukhada as Principal Narayana Pillai
- Vijayakumar as Professor Kurian Thomas
- Sadiq as Commissioner Arun Dev IPS
- Shivaji Guruvayoor as Party President Shivanandan, Vedhika's father
- Bijukuttan as Reji
- Saju Navodaya as Canteen Mani
- Baiju.V.K. as Krishnakumar, Professor
- Janardhanan as Chief Minister
- Ponnamma Babu as Sister Jaseentha
- Roshan Chandra as Vedhika's brother
- Megha Mathew as Athira
- Ameer Niyaz as Jithu
- Neeraja S Das as Ramlath
- Joji as Dinu
- Remya Panicker

=== Cameo appearances ===
- Captain Raju as himself (extended cameo appearance)
- Renji Panicker as Prof. Edward Livingstone
- Divya Pillai as ACP Sreedevi IPS, Anto Antony's friend and subordinate SIT TEAM
- Uday Krishna as himself
- Sanju Sivram as singer in the song "Dinam Dinam"
- Manikkuttan as groom's friend in the song "Mylanchi"
- Anjali Nair as bride's kin in the song "Mylanchi"
- Nithin Renji Panicker as himself
- Tomichan Mulakuppadam as himself
- Vysakh as himself

== Production ==
=== Development ===
In October 2016, Uday Krishna stated that his next screenplay, features Mammootty as a lecturer and would be directed by Ajai Vasudev, and it would be set at the backdrop of a college campus. The film was announced in February 2017 at a ceremony held in Dubai by producer C. H. Muhammed as his debut production venture. In July 2017, film's title was confirmed as Masterpiece. According to Ajay Vasudev, the plot is "something happens in the college and that's what Masterpiece is all about."

=== Casting ===
By February 2017, actors Mukesh, Maqbool Salmaan, Kalabhavan Shajohn, Arjun Nandhakumar, Kailash, and John Kaipallil were confirmed to be in cast, while Unni Mukundan was hired by Ajai Vasudev to an important role, though he had not officially signed at the time. Mukesh was reported to appear in a role of vice principal at the college, while Unni Mukundan's character was confirmed to be not a student. Regarding the character of Mammootty, Ajai Vasudev said, "He plays a strict college professor who doesn't mollycoddle his students, a rough and tough character with a short temper. The characterisation is very much on the lines of the larger-than-life roles." After the character was just described by Ajai to Mammootty, he liked it very much and himself chose the appearance and developed the characteristics.

In April 2017, Gokul Suresh Maqbool Salmaan, John Kaippallil and Santhosh Pandit were confirmed in prominent roles. Pandit allotted one month date. In the same month, Varalaxmi Sarathkumar, Poonam Bajwa and Mahima Nambiar was confirmed in the female leads. According to Ajai Vasudev, "All three actresses have important roles in the film." Uday Krishna revealed that Varalaxmi would play an IPS officer Bhavani Durga and Poonam Bajwa a lecturer. None of the actresses is as a love interest for the hero, as the plot lacks such a thread. Captain Raju also plays a role.

=== Filming ===
The principal photography was commenced on 17 April 2017. Unni Mukundan joined on that day. The films's action was coordinated by 6 stunt coordinators—Kanal Kannan, Stunt Shiva, Stunt Silva, Jolly Bastin, Siruthai Ganesh and Mafia Sasi, to minimize the similar pattern of stunts in the film. Set in Kollam city, film's first schedule was shot at the Fatima Mata National College. Mammootty joined on 10 May. Fight scenes were filmed at the college in 12 days. Poonam Bajwa was part of the college scenes. Second schedule began in early July, shot mainly at a location in Calicut. Mammootty rode a Harley-Davidson Street motorcycle for a scene that was shot on a day in late August. Final schedule of filming began in November and Mammootty's action scenes were shot in Kochi in three days. Then the team moved again to Kollam where a five days filming was planned. Filming concluded in November end in Kochi, with some crucial scenes in the movie shot there in final days. Filming took place in more than 115 days.

== Soundtrack ==
1. "Master of the Masses" - Jack Styles
2. "Madhu Mozhi" - Madhu Balakrishnan
3. "Mylanchi" - Jassie Gift, Chorus
4. "Wake Up" - Jyotsna, Haricharan
5. "Dinam Dinam" - Rony Philip
6. "Kaalam Poyeettum" - Jassie Gift
7. "Mele (Promo Song)" - P. M. Shan

=== Track listing ===
No.	Title	Singer(s)	Length
1.	"Mylanchi"	Jassie Gift, Chorus	4:19

== Release ==
The film was released on 21 December 2017. On the release it was dubbed in Tamil as Perasiriyar Chanakyan and it was released in 2019 in Tamilnadu. It was also dubbed in Hindi as Dashing Jigarwala 2. The satellite rights of that version were sold to Mazhavil Manorama, while the Tamil dubbed version was premiered on Polimer TV on the day of the Pongal festival. The satellite rights to the Hindi dubbed version were sold to Star Gold. The film also has a Kannada dubbed version under the title Professor. In 2021, It was also dubbed and released in Telugu as Great Shankar.

== Reception ==
=== Critical reception ===
Masterpiece received positive reviews from critics.

Sify rated 3 out of 5 stars and concluded the film as a masala entertainer. Deepa Soman of The Times of India gave 2.5 out of 5 stars and wrote "Masterpiece falls flat at many areas and sadly lacks the kick of a commercial, festival release. The so-called mass scenes are aplenty but they aren't entertainingly impactful enough for a film with a runtime of 2 hours and 40 minutes." Behindwoods gave 2.5 out of 5 stars and wrote "Masterpiece is a typical thriller. Mammooty's fans will find it more entertaining." The Hindu cited that the film is an excuse for hero (Mammootty) worship. The Indian Express went on to say that the film is yet another wrong decision by Mammootty.

=== Box office ===
The film was a commercial success and became the first-ever Mollywood movie to be dubbed in Russian. Masterpiece had a release in UAE/GCC regions on January 4, 2017. Reportedly, the movie released in 68 screens across UAE/GCC and the Mammootty starrer was off to a flying start. There are also reports that Masterpiece has crossed the 2K shows count at UAE/GCC regions. The film collected ₹5.11 crore from its first day and ₹13.54 crore from 3 days from Kerala box office. The film collected ₹5 crore from Tamil Nadu box office, which made it highest grossing Malayalam film in Tamil Nadu, which was broken by Kurup in 2021. It is running in 103 screens and has crossed the 13k shows mark in the theatres. The film collected around ₹40 crore from worldwide box office in its final run.
