= Appuram Bengal Ippuram Thiruvithamkoor =

- Theatrical release poster
- Directed by: Sennan Pallassery
- Screenplay by: Eldho Jacob
- Story by: Viju Jhon Edayathara
- Produced by: Prasad Mylakkattu
- Starring: Maqbool Salmaan; Ansiba Hassan; Shammi Thilakan; Captain Raju; Poojitha Menon; Hareesh Perumanna; Saju Navodaya; Idavela Babu; Sasi Kalinga
- Cinematography: Rajeev Vijay
- Edited by: Akhil Alias
- Music by: Jassie Gift
- Production company: Mylakkattu Films
- Release date: 4 March 2016; (India)
- Running time: 130 minutes
- Country: India
- Language: Malayalam

Appuram Bengal Ippuram Thiruvithamkoor is a 2016 Indian Malayalam-language romantic-comedy drama film directed by Sennan Pallassery. The film stars Maqbool Salmaan, Ansiba Hassan, Shammi Thilakan, Captain Raju and Poojitha Menon in the lead roles. Prasad Mylakkattu produced the film under the banner of Mylakkattu Films. The film was released on 4 March 2016.

== Premise ==
A Bengali family comes to Kerala and starts living in a portion of a rented house owned by a politician. Another portion of the house is shared by Shibi, a painter and artist, Ambros, an auto driver and Josappen, a cook. The happy life of the three friends is interrupted by the arrival of the Bengali family.

== Cast ==
- Maqbool Salmaan as Sibi
- Unni Rajan P Dev as Ambroose
- Rajeev Rajan as Joppan
- Nizzar Kodinji as Kumar
- Charulatha as Devayani
- Ansiba Hassan as Saajitha
- Shammi Thilakan as Pastor.Thankachen
- Sunil Sukhada as Suresh Gopi
- Hareesh Perumanna
- Poojitha Menon as Shilpa
- Idavela Babu as Socilist mathachen
- Saju Navodaya as Shibu
- Minon as Anthappan
- Sasi Kalinga as Keeru Paappan
- Pradeep Kottayam
- P. Balachandran as Nambeeshan
- Gourav Menon as Babukuttan
- Lakshmi Priya as Lizy
- Sruthi Madhavan
- Indian Babu
- Captain Raju
- Manivarnan

== Music ==
The soundtrack album for the film was composed by Jassie Gift with lyrics written by B.K. Harinarayanan.

No.	Title	Writer(s)	Singer(s)	Length
1.	"Appurathe Vathil"	B.K. Harinarayan	Pradeep Palluruthy, Anwar Sadath	3:49
2.	"Changaatham"	B.K. Harinarayan	Jassie Gift	3:32
Total length:				7:21
