= Krishnanum Radhayum =

2011 Indian film

- Theatrical release poster
- Directed by: Santhosh Pandit
- Written by: Santhosh Pandit
- Produced by: kochan productions
- Starring: Santhosh Pandit; Devika; Ambalappad Anusree
- Cinematography: Sujith
- Edited by: Santhosh Pandit
- Music by: JB Musicals
- Production company: Sree Krishna Films
- Distributed by: Sree Krishna Films Release
- Release date: 21 October 2011 (India)
- Running time: 165 minutes
- Country: India
- Language: Malayalam

Krishnanum Radhayum (transl. Krishnan and Radha) is a 2011 Indian Malayalam-language romantic drama film written, directed, and produced by Santhosh Pandit. The film starred himself, beside handling major departments in filmmaking, including music composing, lyrics, art direction, editing, visual effects, playback singing, costumes, fight choreography, production design, and title graphics.

Krishnanum Radhayum was released on 21 October 2011 in Kerala. The film, although received widespread criticism from the media, was a commercial success at the box office. Made on a budget of ₹5 lakh, the film grossed more than ₹2 crore from theatres.(by Pandit’s own estimates)

== Plot ==
This film focuses on the love life of John and Radha who admire each other despite belonging to different religions. They get married against the will of their families and consider leasing a house. Yeshodha and her daughter Rugmini are struggling for money and so they decide to rent a section of their house to tenants on the condition that they were Hindus. John and Radha come across this offer and to get the house, John changes his name to Krishnan. Throughout the film, John and Radha face many issues commonly concerning disagreements on their religions.

One day, Radha and John set off to assist Sreelatha, who refuses to eat her food after the death of her husband. John uses a few sneaky tactics and soon Sreelatha commences to follow a healthy diet. She calls John everyday to thank him and invites him to join her on her interview. Radha begins to get a bit suspicious and gets angry towards Sreelatha.

John has a kind natured heart and so he tends to help anyone who is in trouble. One day he saves his brother who was involved in a nasty fight. However, he gets hit in the head and collapses, ending up in hospital. Radha sets off to buy some medicine but does not return as she gets killed by the Uncle of Rugmini. When John finds out, he sets off to kill Rugmini's Uncle and his goons and gets into prison for murder. Life changes when he gets released.

== Cast ==
- Santhosh Pandit as John Krishna
- Anusree as Radha
- Devika as Sreelatha

== Soundtrack ==
All songs were composed by Pandit. Lyrics of seven songs were written by Pandit and A. S. Prasad wrote the lyrics of the song Guruvayoorappa.

No.	Title	Artist(s)	Length
1.	"Rathri Shubharathri"	Santhosh Pandit	5:03
2.	"Anganavadiyile Teachere"	Master Navajyoth Pandit, Bhavya	4:15
3.	"Ma Ma Ma Ma Ma Ma Mayavi"	Santhosh Pandit, Nimmy	4:51
4.	"Radhe Krishna"	Vidhu Prathap	4:31
5.	"Gokulanathanayi"	Santhosh Pandit, Bhavya, Praseetha	3:47
6.	"Sneham Sangeetham"	M. G. Sreekumar	5:04
7.	"Dehiyilla"	M. G. Sreekumar	5:33
8.	"Guruvayoorappa" (Lyrics: A. S. Prasad)	K. S. Chithra	4:10
