= Vijayakumar (Malayalam actor) =

Indian film actor

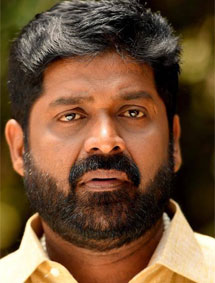
- Education: Mahatma Gandhi College
- Occupation: Actor
- Years active: 1987-present
- Spouse: Binu Daniel (divorced)
- Children: 2 (incl. Arthana Binu)

Vijayakumar is an Indian actor who works in Malayalam-language films. He is known for his roles in supporting and negative roles in Malayalam cinema.

== Personal life ==
Vijayakumar's father was a film producer who produced Malayalam-language films. He pursued a bachelor's degree in economics at the Mahatma Gandhi College in Thiruvananthapuram.

Vijayakumar was married to Binu Daniel. The couple later got divorced. They have two daughters, including actress Arthana Binu. Arthana debuted as an actress in the 2016 film Mudhugauv alongside Gokul Suresh, son of actor Suresh Gopi. In July 2023, his daughter posted a video of the actor allegedly trespassing into his ex-wife's property.

== Filmography ==
Year	Title	Role	Notes
1992	Thalastaanam	Unnikrishnan	
1993	Jackpot	Nikhil	
1993	Uppukandam Brothers	James Chacko	
1993	Bhoomi Geetham	Sethunathan	
1994	Gamanam	SI Surendran	
1994	Napolean	Manu	
1995	Sudha Mathalam	Dr. Chandrashekhar	
1995	Tharavadu	Ramesh	
1995	Special Squad	Samkutty	
1995	Prayikkara Pappan	Chandran	
1997	Lelam	Sunny Cherian Karimpanal	
1997	Kottappurathe Koottukudumbam	Jayadevan	
1997	Hitler Brothers	Dr. Gopan	
1998	Amma Ammaayiyamma	Raghu	
1998	Illamura Thamburan	Chandran	
1999	Pathram	Vincent Peter	
1999	Thachiledathu Chundan	Murali	
1999	Crime File	Monayi	
1999	Ezhupunna Tharakan	Babychan	
1999	Swastham Grihabharanam	Shibu	
2000	Narasimham	Jayakrishnan	
2000	Sradha	Narendran IPS	
2000	Valliettan	Appu	
2001	Nariman	Manu	
2001	Dubai	Yousaf	
2001	Praja	Appu	
2001	Onnaman	Balan	
2001	Rakshasa Rajavu	SP Gopalkumar	
2001	Saivar Thirumeni	Sam	
2002	Shivam	Rasheed	
2002	Thandavam	Tomichan	
2004	Wanted	Sreekanth	
2004	Natturajavu	Advocate	
2005	The Tiger	Haris C. Khan	
2006	Chinthamani Kolacase	Soolapani Warrier	
2006	Bada Dosth	Commissioner James Albert IPS	
2007	Time	CI Venu	
2007	Sooryan		
2007	Nadiya Kollappetta Rathri	Balu Madhav	
2007	Ali Bhai		
2008	Ellam Avan Seyal		Tamil
2009	Chemistry	CI Ramdas	
2009	Red Chillies		
2009	Winter	Saju Paul IPS	
2010	Janakan	ACP Jayapalan	
2010	Vandae Maatharam	Police Superintendent	
2011	Traffic	Mathew	
2011	Sandwich	Murugan	
2012	Simhasanam	SP Chandrashekharan	
2012	I Love Me	SI Paul Alunkal	
2014	God's Own Country	CI Alex	
2014	Cousins	Rajarajan	
2015	Jamna Pyari	Bank President	
2015	Anarkali	Prosecutor	
2015	Rajamma @ Yahoo	Abraham's son	
2016	Karinkunnam 6's	Pranchi	
2016	Annmariya Kalippilaanu	James	
2016	IDI - Inspector Dawood Ibrahim	Alex Idikkula	
2017	The Great Father	Venture Employee	
2017	Puthan Panam	Jamshad	
2017	Sherlock Toms	Sathyaprathapan	
2017	Masterpiece	Professor Kurian Thomas	
2018	Krishnam	Savio	
2018	Aabhaasam		
2019	Pattabhiraman	Anantha Narayan	
2019	Brother's Day	CI Alex Kurian	
2019	Driving Licence		
2022	Karnan Napoleon Bhagath Singh		
2022	Kaduva	SI Rajeev	
2023	Akasham Kadann	Rauf	
2023	Rahel Makan Kora	Pala Karia	
2024	Ithuvare		
2024	Hunt		
2024	Oru Kattil Oru Muri		
2025	Aabhyanthara Kuttavaali		
