= Akasham Kadann =

- Directed by: Sidhique Kodiyathur
- Written by: Sidhique Kodiyathur
- Produced by: Saleem Lamees; Rahaman Pocker Maranchery; Sidhique P Fasal Parambadan
- Starring: Maqbool Salman; Ibrahim Kutty; Kulappulli Leela
- Cinematography: Latheef Maranchery
- Edited by: Shameer
- Music by: Sheikh Ellahi
- Production company: Dawn Cinemas
- Release date: 21 July 2023
- Running time: 136 minutes
- Country: India
- Language: Malayalam

Akasham Kadann is a 2023 Indian Malayalam language film written and directed by Sidhique Kodiyathur featuring Maqbool Salman, Ibrahim Kutty and Kulappulli Leela.

== Plot ==
Rassal, a handicapped been avoided by his friends and neighbours due to his ability and due to his condition, his sister's marriage was getting cancelled. But his life changes when his sister marries. His brother in law finds out he have talent in remembering certain long objects.

== Cast ==
- Maqbool Salman as Fazal
- Ibrahim Kutty as Ummer Koya
- Kulappulli Leela as Ummikutty
- Nilumbur Ayisha as Muthu's mother
- Amal Iqbal as Rassal
- Vijayakumar as Rauf
- Shafi Kollam as Ameer
- Priya Sreejith as Sajna
- Sidhique Kodiyathur as Abdu
- Ansil Rahman as Muthu's Brother
- Asharaf Pilakal as Muthu's Brother
- Benna Chennamangallur as Anchor
- Rahman Maranchery as Ussan
- Fasal Parambadan as Officer
- C T Kabeer
- Prakash Payyanakkal as Sasi Sir
- Avisanna Wandoor as Headmaster
- Shivakanth Nilambur as Fahad
- Kuttippuram Latheef as Sajna's Father
- Das Tirur as Ameer's Father
- Abul Ahla Wandoor as Officer
- Ramesh Kappad as Muthu
- Bhuvaneswary Biju as Ruby
- Rajani Murali as Rabiya
- Manju Subash as Fausiya
- Davis Chiramel
- Nazar Maanu as Special School Director
- Dhwani Lakshmi as Faseela
- Anju Krishna as Nurse
- Aswathi Anand as Teacher
- Ameer Karakkunnu as Clerk
