= Dooram =

2016 Malayalam film

- Directed by: Manu Kannamthanam
- Starring: Maqbool Salmaan; Shine Tom Chacko; Bhagath Manuel; Nirmal V. Benny; Aima Rosmy Sebastian; Aina Elsmy Sebastian
- Release date: 19 August 2016
- Running time: 128 minutes
- Country: India
- Language: Malayalam

Dooram (transl. Distance) is a 2016 Indian Malayalam-language romantic comedy film directed by Manu Kannamthanam starring Maqbool Salmaan, Shine Tom Chacko and Bhagath Manuel. Twin sisters Aina Elsmy Sebastian and Aima Rosmy Sebastian played the female leads.

== Plot ==
Dennis, Sam, Sameer and Shanavas are four close college-friends. Dennis is in a relationship with Ann Mariya and Sameer is with Rasiya while Sam does not believe in love. After college Dennis splits with Ann but Sameer and Rasiya end up married. Dennis is now a business consultant and meets Riti Sathyanarayanan during a business trip and was surprised by her similarity with Ann and tries to get close to her. What happens next form the story.

== Cast ==
- Maqbool Salmaan as Dennis Paul
- Shine Tom Chacko as Sam
- Bhagath Manuel as Sameer
- Nirmal V. Benny as Shanavas
- Aima Rosmy Sebastian as Ann Maria
- Aina Elsmy Sebastian as Rithi Sathyanarayanan
- Archana Kavi as Rasiya
- Suraj Venjaramoodu
- Sai Kumar
- Sasi Kalinga
- Edavela Babu
- Shivaji Guruvayoor
- Anjali Aneesh as Meera
- Ranjini Murali
- Gayathri
- Sunny Wayne
- Praveen Prem
- Lena
- Ambika Mohan

== Production ==
The film was first named Love and Love Only which was later changed to Dooram. It was shot in Malaysia, Hyderabad and in various places in Kochi.
