= London Bridge (film) =

- A bridge can join hearts too.
- Directed by: Anil C. Menon
- Written by: Jinu V. Abraham
- Produced by: Satish B. Satish; Antony Binoy
- Starring: Prithviraj Sukumaran; Andrea Jeremiah; Nanditha Raj; Pratap Pothen; Mukesh
- Cinematography: Jithu Damodar
- Edited by: Praveen Prabhakar
- Music by: Rahul Raj; Sreevalsan J. Menon
- Production company: Ordinary Films
- Distributed by: Central Pictures
- Release date: 1 February 2014
- Country: India
- Language: Malayalam

London Bridge is a 2014 Indian Malayalam-language romantic drama film directed by Anil C. Menon and written by Jinu V. Abraham, starring Prithviraj Sukumaran, Andrea Jeremiah, Nanditha Raj, Pratap Pothen and Mukesh. The film was entirely shot in the United Kingdom.

Rahul Raj composed three original songs and left the project owing to scheduling conflicts. Thus Carnatic vocalist Dr. Sreevalsan Menon was hired to compose two additional songs and Gopi Sundar was signed in to compose the background score. The film is produced by Antony Binoy and Sathish B. Satish under the banner Ordinary Pictures.

== Plot ==
Vijay Das is a career-oriented businessman in London who always listens to his brain. At the same time, Vijay's fiancée Pavithra, who is also the daughter of Vijay's mentor, C. S. Nambiar, and always listens to her heart. Vijay was asked to marry Pavitra by Nambiar, and Pavitra tests whether Vijay is the right guy for her.

Driving his way home after spending a day with Pavithra, Vijay hits Merin, a nurse who has just arrived from India to work in London. Her wrist gets paralyzed after the accident. Vijay takes care of her and eventually falls in love with her and vice versa.

Nambiar and Vijay's friend Francis fix Vijay's and Pavithra's marriage. But when he refuses to marry her, Francis forces him to marry Pavitra because of her wealth. Merin's job agreement gets terminated because they think that she is physically unfit. Francis tries to help her but fails. Eventually, Francis forces Vijay to not give her false hopes and gift her a sum of money and let her go back to India. Merin refuses the amount of money gifted and asks him to show her around London before she leaves. Then Merin goes back to India.

The next day, her relative Gracy calls Vijay to tell that Merin has not reached her home yet. Gracy's husband Thambi Kutty tells them that he will go to India to enquire about Merin, but Vijay says that he will go instead because he is the one who is supposed to go. Francis tries to force him to stay, but Vijay says that he really likes Merin and he will go to India no matter what.

Pavithra helps him to go to India by convincing her father to not stop him and personally dropping him at the airport. Vijay reaches India. While in a taxi, Francis calls Vijay and directs him to go to Merin's home. Vijay reaches Merin's home, where he finds out that Merin has reached home safely. But also find out that her house had been seized by a moneylender. When Vijay meets depressed Merin at her room, at that time, Pavithra called Vijay and reveals that Merin had lied to make Vijay realize his love for her. The film ends by showing Vijay and Merin uniting.

== Cast ==
- Prithviraj Sukumaran as Kannedathu Vijay Das
- Andrea Jeremiah as Pavithra, Vijay's fiancée
- Nanditha Raj as Merin Elsa John
- Pratap Pothen as C. S. Nambiar
- Mukesh as Advocate Francis Pallipadan
- Sunil Sukhada as Thambi Kutty
- Lena as Gracy
- Amritha Anil as Maalu (Merin's sister)
- Prem Prakash as John Daniel
- Sreehari as Devassikutty
- Devi Krupa as Swathi

== Production ==
London Bridge was started in August 2013 in Central London. The film covers almost every part of London in its shots. The film was earlier planned to release during Onam Festival but since it was not completed yet, the release was postponed to 1 February 2014.

== Music ==
London Bridge (film)

Soundtrack album London Bridge (film) by Rahul Raj
- Released: 2014
- Genre: Film soundtrack
- Language: Malayalam
- Label: Satyam Audios
- Producers: Satish B Satish, Antony Binoy

Rahul Raj chronology
D Company (2013)	London Bridge (film) (2014)	Mannar Mathai Speaking 2 (2014)

Rahul Raj was signed in as the composer of the film. But after composing the main theme music and two songs, he left the project owing to time constraints and other commitments. Carnatic vocalist Dr. Sreevalsan Menon was hired to compose two additional songs. Rahul Raj was set to return to the project to compose the background score of the movie; but scheduling conflicts with his Telugu film Paathshala forced him to opt out completely. However the main theme music composed by Rahul Raj was retained and used as the opening titles theme.

Track name	Singers	Description
"London Bridge Theme"	Gitamba (Netherlands)	Composed by Rahul Raj
"Kannaadi Vaathil"	Haricharan	Composed by Rahul Raj
"Chinni Chinni"	Yazin Nizar	Composed by Rahul Raj
"Ennum Ninne"	Shaan	Composed by Sreevalsan J. Menon
"Venmegham"	Amal Antony, Rachana Sinto, Deepu Nair	Composed by Sreevalsan J. Menon

== Release ==
The film was released on 1 February 2014 at 72 theaters across Kerala and the distribution was done by Central Pictures.

== Reception ==
London Bridge has received mixed-to-positive reviews from critics, The Malayalam website Muyal Media has rated 3.2/5 stars for London Bridge and mentioned that "London Bridge, a triangular love story happening in London has got a kind of freshness in its visuals but lacks the same in the narrative."
