= Anjali Nair (actress, born 1988) =

Indian actress and politician

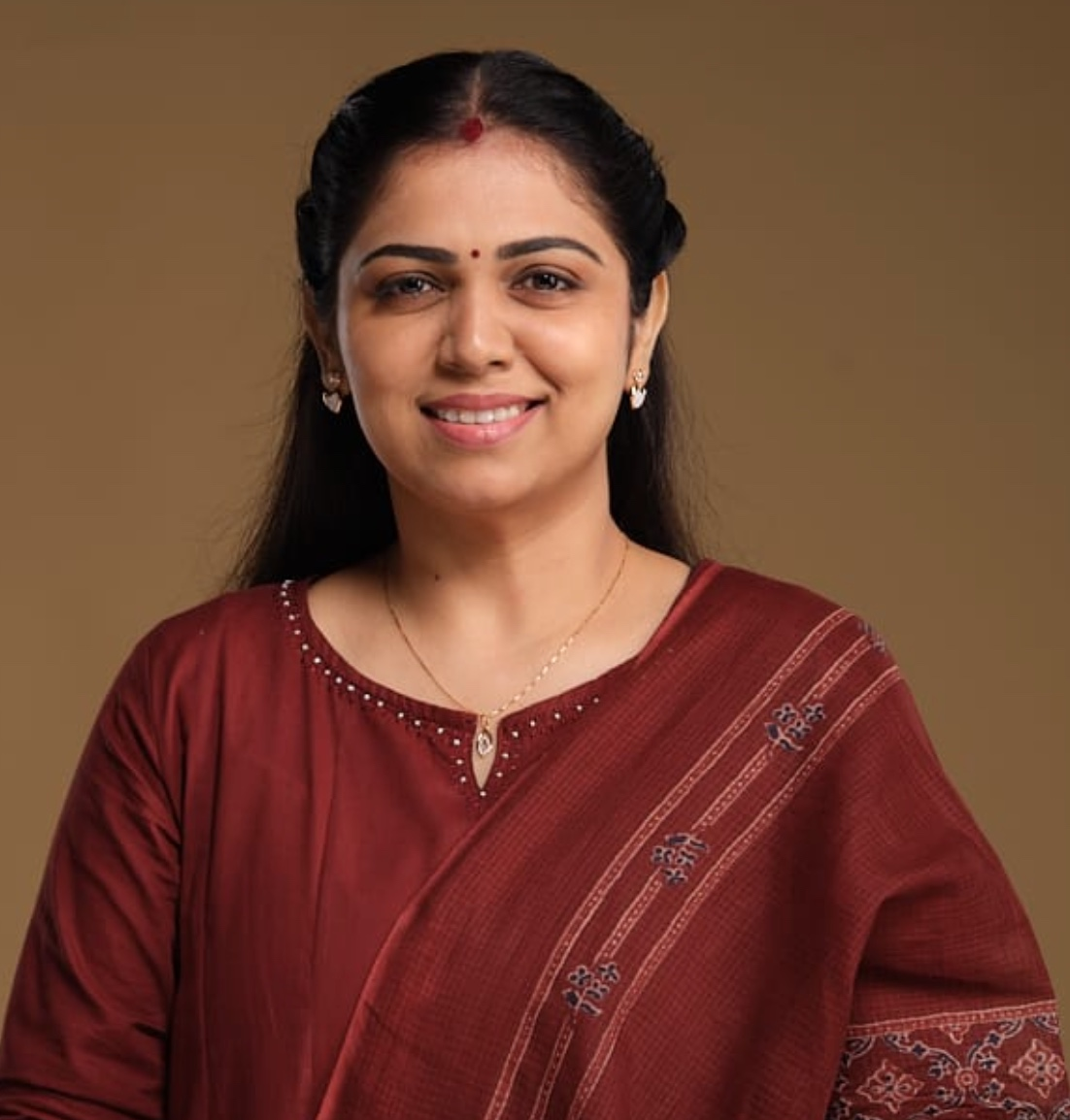
- Anjali in 2026
- Born: Anjali P. V. 1988 (age 37–38); Cochin, Kerala, India
- Occupations: Actress; Television presenter; Politician
- Years active: 1994–1996; 2010–present
- Notable work: Drishyam 2, Ben
- Political party: Twenty 20 Party
- Spouse(s): Aneesh Upasana (2011-2016..div) Ajith Raju (m. 2022)
- Children: Two
- Father: Giridharan Nair
- Awards: Kerala State Film Award for Best Character Actress

Anjali P. V., also known as Anjali Nair, is an Indian actress and politician who predominantly works in Malayalam films. She is a recipient of the Kerala State Film Award for Best Character Actress in 2015.

== Early and personal life ==
She began her career as a child artist in Manathe Vellitheru.

Anjali married Aneesh Upasana, but they separated. She has a daughter Aavni, who acted as her daughter in 5 Sundarikal. She married Ajith Raju in 18 February 2022. They have a baby girl.

== Acting career ==
Anjali started off as a model, before working as a television anchor and acting in more than one hundred advertisements. She then acted in many music albums, including La Cochin by Vineeth Sreenivasan. She has featured in a television serial titled "Bandhangal Bandhanangal" and appeared in many television shows. As of May 2021, she had appeared in 127 films.

== Political career ==
In 2026, she joined Twenty 20 Party, an ally of NDA (led by Bharathiya Janata Party) and contested the Kerala Assembly elections from the Thrippunithura Assembly constituency. She got third position.

== Filmography ==
=== Malayalam films ===
Year	Title	Role	Notes
1994	Manathe Vellitheru		Child artist
1995	Mangalyasootram		Child artist
1996	Lalanam		Child artist
2009	Nammal Thammil	College Student	Completed in 2004
2011	Seniors	Reni	
2011	Venicile Vyapari	Ammu's Friend	
2012	The King & the Commissioner	National Security Advisor's PA	
2012	Scene Onnu Nammude Veedu	TV Reporter	
2012	Matinee	Muslim bride	
2013	5 Sundarikal	Sethulakshmi's mother	
2013	Pattam Pole	Bride Kunjulakshmi	
2013	ABCD: American-Born Confused Desi	Honey	
2014	Koothara	Priya	
2014	Monayi Angane Aanayi	Servant	
2014	Munnariyippu	Journalist	
2014	Tamaar Padaar	Vanitha	
2014	Central Theater	Mariya John	
2014	100 Degree Celsius	Nanda	
2014	Asha Black	Anwar Ali's wife	
2014	Angels	Nandita	
2014	Actually	Roopa	
2014	Seconds	Haseena	
2015	Mili	Anitha	
2015	Aadu	Usha	
2015	Lailaa O Lailaa	Office Staff, Zukni	
2015	Love 24x7	Nandhini	
2015	Acha Dhin	Nurse	
2015	Adi Kapyare Kootamani	Ammachi's daughter-in-law	
2015	Kanal	Revathyi's relative	
2015	Compartment	Teacher	
2015	Nellikka	Sophy	
2015	Nikkah	Christina	
2015	Onnam Loka Mahayudham	Lissy	
2015	White Boys	Geetha	
2015	Ben	Asha Justin	Kerala State Film Award for Best Character Actress
2016	Kali	House owner's daughter	
2016	Kammatipaadam	Nalini	
2016	Annmariya Kalippilannu	Megha	
2016	Out of Range	Aswathy	
2016	Oppam	Lakshmi	
2016	Olappeeppi	Devi	
2016	Pulimurugan	Murugan's mother	
2016	Kolumittayi	Daisy	
2016	Marupadi	Mother Superior, Julie	
2016	Daffedar	Doctor	
2016	Pallikoodam	Amina	
2016	Popcorn	Yogita	
2016	Dooram	Meera	
2016	Sukhamayirikkatte	Ayishu	
2017	Take Off	Hasna	
2017	Sakhavu	Suja	
2017	Rakshadhikari Baiju Oppu	Bijila	
2017	Role Models	Natasha	
2017	E	Elsamma	
2017	Naval Enna Jewel	Reena	
2017	Pullikkaran Staraa	Mayur's wife	
2017	Pokkiri Simon	Jayamol Ganesh	
2017	Crossroad	Padmavathi	Segment: Maya
2017	Lava Kusha	Vanaja	
2017	Chunkzz	Ancy	
2017	Chakkaramaavin Kombathu	Jayasree	
2017	Masterpiece	Dancer	Guest appearance
2017	Honey Bee 2.5	Herself	
2017	Zacharia Pothen Jeevichirippundu	Mariya's friend	
2017	Prethamundu Sookshikkuka	Janaki	
2017	Vilakkumaram	Anjaly	
2017	Hadiya	Adv. Sulthath	
2017	Overtake	Teena	
2017	Theeram	Aki's wife	
2017	Sadrish Vaakyam 24:29	Ayisha	
2017	Oru Malayala Colour Padam	-	
2018	Daivame Kaithozham K. Kumar Akanam	Seema Gopi	
2018	Aami	Khamar	
2018	Mohanlal	Meenukutty's mother	
2018	Kammara Sambhavam	Kammaran's mother	
2018	B.Tech	Azmi	
2018	Premasoothram	Sugandhi Teacher	
2018	Krishnam	Anuradha's mother	
2018	Kidu	Sneha Teacher	
2018	Thanaha	Vimala Prabhakaran	
2018	Vikadakumaran		
2018	Suvarna Purushan		
2019	Vijay Superum Pournamiyum	Home Nurse	
2019	Mikhael	Issac's wife	
2019	Lonappante Mamodeesa	Annakutty	
2019	Oru Adaar Love	English teacher	
2019	Vaarikkuzhiyile Kolapathakam	Salamma	
2019	Krishnam	Anuradha's mother	
2019	Swarna Malsyangal	Anjali's mother	
2019	Panthu	Mrs. Sudheesh	
2019	Kuttymama	Indira	
2019	Chila New Gen Naattu Visheshangal	Kamala Nair	
2019	Kalki	Vyshakhan's wife	
2019	Safe	SI Vani	
2019	Munthiri Monchan: Oru Thavala Paranja Kadha	Magistrate	
2019	Edakkad Battalion 06	Gowri	
2019	Mohabbathin Kunjabdulla	Crying Baby's Mother	
2019	Isakkinte Ithihasam	Arunima	
2019	Oru Nalla Kottayamkkaran	Sisily Thomas	
2019	Vikruthi	—N/a	Executive producer
2019	Vattameshasammelanam		
2020	Marjara Oru Kallu Vecha Nuna	Teesa	
2020	Oru Vadakkan Pennu	Sivan's wife	
2020	Forensic	Malavika's mother	
2020	Love FM	Safiyas Ghazal	
2020	Kozhipporu	Jibina	
2020	Maniyarayile Ashokan	Psychiatrist	
2021	Drishyam 2	Saritha	
2021	Meezan	Jameela	
2021	Mohan Kumar Fans	Latha	
2021	Ellam Sheriyakum	Mridula	
2021	Kaaval	Kunjumol	
2021	Vidhi:The Verdict	Sakshi	
2021	Djibouti	Grassy	
2022	Baby Sam	Vidya	
2022	Aarattu	Collector	
2022	Aviyal	Diana	
2022	Third World Boys	Shine's lover	
2022	Kochaal	Dr. Mary Muthachan	
2022	Viddikalude Mash	Sruthi teacher	
2022	Ulkkazhcha	Vatsala	
2022	Monster	Gayathri	
2023	Vaathil	Surumi	
2026	Revolver Rinko		
2026	Ananthan Kaadu	Chandrika	
TBA	Ram †	TBA	

=== Other language films ===
Year	Title	Role	Language	Notes
2010	Nellu	Thamara	Tamil	credited as Bhagyanjali
2010	Kotti	Thulasi	Tamil	
2010	Unnaiye Kadhalipen	Vaidehi	Tamil	
2014	Idhuvum Kadandhu Pogum	Deepika	Tamil	
2014	Nee Naan Nizhal	Anwar Ali's wife	Tamil	
2021	Agadu	Dr. Suja	Tamil	
2021	Annaatthe	Kaalaiyaan's mother	Tamil	
2022	Namo	Susheela	Sanskrit	
2023	Chithha	Sundari's mother	Tamil	
2026	Couple Friendly	Siva’s sister-in-law	Telugu	

=== Short films ===
Year	Title	Role	Notes
2009	La Cochin	Anjali	Musical album
2015	Punchirikku Parasparam	School Girl's Mother	Short Film
2015	Jalam Kondulla Muruvikal	Deepa teacher	Short Film
2015	Celebrate Happiness	Herself	Video Song
2017	Amar Jawan Amar Bharath	Soldier's wife	Patriotic Video
2017	Oru Muthassi Gatha	Anjali	Short Film
2017	She Deserves Better	Lakshmi	Video
2017	Nanda	Nanda's mother	
2017	Chitra	Chitra	
2017	Canvas	Meera Manu	
2017	Entha Ingane?	Ammu	Also director
2018	Nithyaharitha Kamukan	School boy's mom	
2018	Sahitham	Grandmother	
2019	The Secret	Roshni	
2019	Oppana	Suhara Senior	
2021	Elizabeth	Merlin	
2021	Aakasmikam	Shalini	
2021	Thiththiri	Wife	
2022	Dear Dad	Revathy	

== Television ==
Year	Title	Role	Notes
1990's	Bandhangal Bandhanangal	Actress	TV Serial; Child artist
2015	Sadyavattam	Host	Cookery
2016	Thara Pachakam	Celebrity preseneter	Cookery
2016	Smart Show	Participant	Game show
2021	Udan Panam 3.O	Participant	Game show
2021	Salt and Pepper	Celebrity Presenter	Cookery
2023	Flowers Oru Kodi	Participant	Game show
2025	Annies Kitchen	Guest	Cookery chat show
2025	Durga	Jayashri	TV Serial
2026	Know Your Leader	Guest	ZEE5 chat show
