= Sunil Sukhada =

Indian film actor in Malayalam cinema (born 1974)

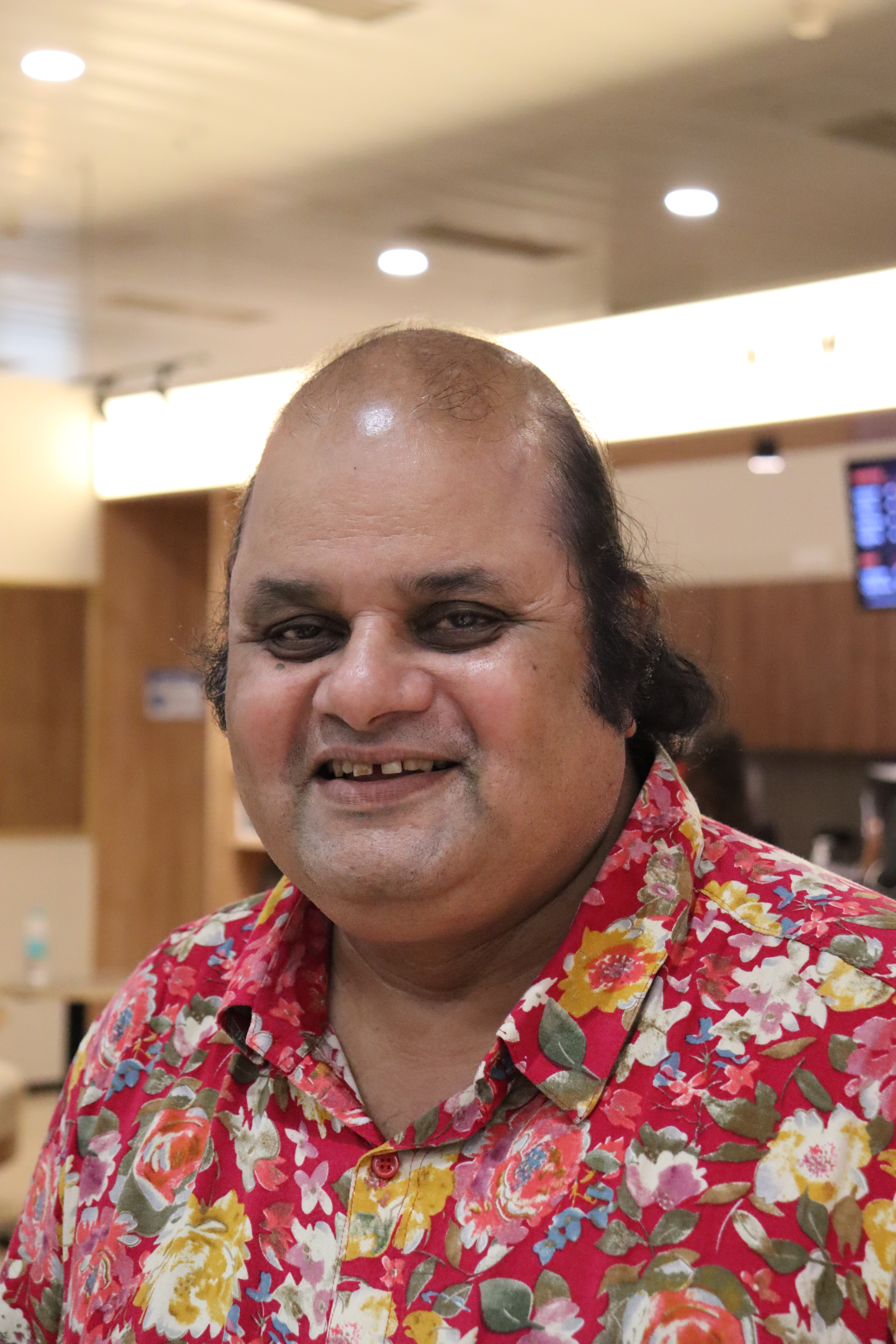
- Born: Thrissur, Kerala, India
- Occupation: Actor
- Years active: 2010–present

Sunil Sukhada is an Indian actor in Malayalam cinema. He debuted in a small role in the film Best Actor. His first full length role was as the supermarket manager in Chappa Kurishu (2011). He won a special mention in the Kerala state television awards 2017 for Appoppanthaadi.

== Personal life ==
He was born the second of five children, to Sudhakara Panikkar and Saraswathiyamma, at Poothole, Thrissur. His father was a school teacher and his mother a housewife. He had his primary education from Church Mission Society Higher Secondary School, Thrissur (C.M.S Boys School Thrissur) and holds a bachelor's degree in economics from Sree Kerala Varma College, Thrissur. He is unmarried.

== Filmography ==
Key
†	Denotes films that have not yet been released

=== Malayalam films ===
Year	Title	Role	Notes
2010	Best Actor		
2011	Swapna Sanchari	Bank Manager	
2011	Chaappa Kurishu	Martin	
2011	Salt N' Pepper	Koya	Credited as Sunil Thrissur
2012	101 Weddings		
2012	Idiots		
2012	Matinee		
2012	Molly Aunty Rocks!	Shamsudheen	
2012	Jawan of Vellimala	Ittichan	
2012	Scene Onnu Nammude Veedu		
2012	Naughty Professor		
2012	Madirasi	Father	
2012	Masters		
2012	Thiruvambadi Thampan		
2012	Bachelor Party	Paul	
2012	Thappana		
2012	Bhoopadathil Illatha Oridam		
2012	Prabhuvinte Makkal		
2012	Padmasree Bharat Dr. Saroj Kumar	Kadalundi Madhavan	
2012	Ustad Hotel	Hotel Customer	
2012	Unnam	Settji	
2012	Thalsamayam Oru Penkutty	P.T. Pavithran	
2013	Ms. Lekha Tharoor Kanunnathu	Lekha's neighbour	
2013	Isaac Newton S/O Philipose	Nelson	
2013	Punyalan Agarbattis	Judge	
2013	Kaanchi		
2013	Olipporu		
2013	Tourist Home		
2013	Nadan	Producer	
2013	Red Wine	Rathnakaran Pillai	
2013	Nadodimannan	Vaarijaakshan	
2013	Pottas Bomb		
2013	Bicycle Thieves		
2013	Pattam Pole	Avarachan	
2013	August Club	Lona	
2013	Vedivazhipadu	Mathaikunju	
2013	Bharya Athra Pora	Principal	
2013	Arikil Oraal		
2013	Kadal Kadannu Oru Mathukkutty	Sugunan	
2013	Vallatha Pahayan		
2013	Paisa Paisa	Aalikka	
2013	Shwaasam		
2013	Immanuel	Joseph	
2013	Amen	Kappiyar Kochouseppu	
2013	3 Dots	Driver	
2014	Cousins	Poly/Tony's dad	
2014	Ithihasa	K. Sebastian	
2014	Mylanchi Monchulla Veedu	Ibrahim Sahib	
2014	Vellimoonga	Father	
2014	Manglish	Anglo Charlie	
2014	Cinema @ PWD Rest House		
2014	Money Ratnam	Makudi Dass	
2014	Gunda		
2014	Vegham	Paulose Achayan	
2014	Naku Penta Naku Taka	Karunan	
2014	Karnavar	Vasu	
2014	Beware of Dogs	Thulaseedharan Pillai	
2014	Ulsaha Committee		
2014	Polytechnic		
2014	7th Day	Security Simon	
2014	Puravasthu		
2014	Balyakalasakhi	Avuran	
2014	Happy Journey	Security	
2014	Nattarang		
2014	Parayan Baaki Vechathu		
2014	Oru Korean Padam	Vijayan	
2014	Odum Raja Aadum Rani		
2014	On The Way		
2014	Flat No. 4B		
2014	Colour Balloon		
2014	Raktharakshassu 3D		
2014	London Bridge	Thampikutty	
2015	Jo and the Boy	Daddy	
2015	Aana Mayil Ottakam		In the segment: "Aa Ee"
2015	Su.. Su... Sudhi Vathmeekam	Holistic Doctor	
2015	Salt Mango Tree	Kumar	
2015	Pathemari	Vasu	
2015	Urumbukal Urangarilla		
2015	Utopiayile Rajavu	Soman Thampi	
2015	Rasputin	Lecturer	
2015	Pickles		
2015	Mumbai Taxi	Taxi driver	
2015	Kanyaka Talkies	Vishwambharan	
2015	Njan Samvidhanam Cheyyum		
2015	Life of Josutty	Fr. Gabriel	
2015	Kerala Today		
2015	Rudra Simhasanam	Advocate Mukkodan	
2015	Vishwasam Athallae Ellaam	Henry Martin	
2015	32aam adhyayam 23aam vaakyam	Shop Owner	
2015	Nee-Na	idicula	
2015	Oru Second Class Yathra	Pindam biju	
2015	Chirakodinja Kinavukal	Producer Joppan Ezhupunna	
2015	Namasthe Bali Island	Joychan	
2015	Next		
2015	Ellam Chettante Ishtam Pole	Veluthambi	
2015	Appavum Veenjum		
2015	Ivan Maryadaraman	Rajeev's father	
2016	Campus Diary		
2016	Romanov		
2016	Marubhoomiyile Aana	Pilakandil Jeweler's owner	
2016	Inspector Dawood Ibrahim	Head constable Kuttan Pilla	
2016	Kismath	ASI Nair	
2016	Pa Va	Brother Paili	
2016	Pretham	Sabu	
2016	Zoom		
2016	White		
2016	James and Alice	Family counsellor	
2016	Hidden in the lights	Vasu	
2016	Shajahanum Pareekuttiyum	Church priest	
2016	Anyarkku Praveshanamilla		
2016	Hallelooya	Sreedharan Unnithan	
2016	Shikhamani		
2016	Sukhamayirikkatte		
2016	Chennaikoottam		
2016	Ithu Thaanda Police	Xavier	
2016	Paavada	Thevally Manoharan	
2016	Appuram Bengal Eppuram Thiruvithamkoor		
2017	Chicken Kokkachi	Heroine's Father	
2017	Pareeth Pandari	Krishnan	
2017	Basheerinte Premalekhanam		
2017	Randuper		
2018	Kinar	Lazar Kunnamkulam	Bilingual film
2018	Mazhayathu	Police Constable	
2018	Kayamkulam Kochunni	Brahmin	
2019	Janaadhipan	Bakkar	
2019	Thami		
2019	Lucifer	Manappattil Chandy	
2019	Porinju Mariam Jose	School Master	
2019	Ittymaani: Made in China	Fr. Chandykunju	
2019	Mamangam	Kanara Perumal	
2019	Ganagandharvan	Saju	
2020	Uriyattu	Policeman	
2020	Paapam Cheyyathavar Kalleriyatte	Varghese Mathen	
2021	Muddy	Mathayichan	
2021	Deadline		
2021	Bhramam	Music shop owner	
2021	Djibouti		
2022	Karnan Napoleon Bhagath Singh		
2022	Archana 31 Not Out	School principal	
2022	E.M.I	Varghese	
2022	Solamante Theneechakal	Nikhil Davis	
2022	Kenkemam	Babumon	
2022	Pathonpatham Noottandu	Chandru Pillai	
2022	Bharatha Circus	Ashokan	
2023	Within Seconds	Sresh Annan	
2023	Pendulum	Alex Ichayan	
2023	Corona Dhavan	Priest of the Church	
2023	Madhura Manohara Moham	Janardhanan Nair	
2023	Kondotty Pooram		
2023	Vaathil		
2023	Mothathi Kozhappa		
2024	Peppatty	Priest	
2024	Iyer In Arabia	Pramukh	
2024	Kallanmaarude Veedu		
2024	Aaro		
2024	Sambhava Sthalathu Ninnum		
2024	Kuttante Shinigami		
2024	Porattu Naadakam		
2025	Behindd		
2025	Ambalamukkile Visheshangal		
2026	Koodothram		
2026	Juniors Journey		

=== Tamil films ===
Year	Title	Role	Notes
2011	Poraali	Malayali	
2018	Keni	Lazar Kunnamkulam	Bilingual film
2023	Por Thozhil	Muthu Selvan	
2024	Bloody Beggar	Vithagan	
2025	Madras Matinee	Boomer Uncle	
2026	Jailer 2	Benjamin	

== Awards and nominations ==
Year	Award	Category	Work	Result	Ref.
2023	South Indian International Movie Awards	Best Actor in a Negative Role – Tamil	Por Thozhil	Nominated	

== Television ==
- 2023:Surabhiyum Suhasiniyum
- 2024:Chakkappazham
