= May Dinam =

- Directed by: A. P. Sathyan
- Written by: Mathew Mattam; Sai Kripa (dialogues)
- Screenplay by: Sai Kripa
- Produced by: N. Gopalakrishnan
- Starring: Sai Kumar; Jagathy Sreekumar; Innocent; Sivaram; Adoor Bhavani
- Cinematography: Madhu
- Edited by: A. P. Joseph
- Music by: M. G. Radhakrishnan
- Production company: Saikripa Productions
- Distributed by: Saikripa Productions
- Release date: 7 December 1991
- Country: India
- Language: Malayalam

May Dinam is a 1990 Indian Malayalam-language film, directed by A. P. Sathyan and produced by N. Gopalakrishnan. An adaptation of the novel of the same name by Mathew Mattam, the film stars Sai Kumar, Jagathy Sreekumar, Innocent, and Adoor Bhavani. The film had a musical score by M. G. Radhakrishnan. It also marked Lissy's last official Malayalam film on-screen- shortly after her marriage and subsequent retirement from the industry.

== Cast ==
- Jagathy Sreekumar as Damodharan
- Innocent as Ouseph
- Sai Kumar as Martin
- Adoor Pankajam as Mariya
- Balan K. Nair
- Janardanan as Chachappan
- Lalu Alex as SI Haridas
- Mala Aravindan as Coach Warrier
- Mamukkoya
- Syama as Omana
- Lissy as Elizabeth

== Soundtrack ==
The music was composed by M. G. Radhakrishnan and the lyrics were written by K. Jayakumar.

No.	Song	Singers	Lyrics	Length (m:ss)
1	"Chorathudikkum Kaikal Gaadha Rachikkum"	K. J. Yesudas, Chorus	K. Jayakumar	
2	"Ethranaalethranaalum Ninneyum Kaathirikkaam"	K. J. Yesudas, K. S. Chithra	K. Jayakumar	
