= God's Own Country (2014 film) =

2014 film

- Film poster
- Directed by: Vasudevan Sanal
- Written by: V. Praveen Kumar; Anish Francis; Arun Gopinath
- Produced by: Haseeb Hanif; Anto Joseph
- Starring: Fahadh Faasil; Isha Talwar; Sreenivasan; Lal
- Cinematography: Arun James; Arvind Krishna
- Edited by: Ratheesh Raj
- Music by: Gopi Sundar
- Release date: 9 May 2014
- Country: India
- Language: Malayalam

God's Own Country is a 2014 Indian Malayalam-language film directed by Vasudevan Sanal. The film was initially titled RED (Rare Emotional Day).

== Plot synopsis ==
God's Own Country is a three interwoven story. A taxi driver (Lal) desperately seeking money for his daughter's operation, Manu Krishna (Fahadh Faasil) travelling to Kerala to earn bail money for his wife, Asha (Isha Talwar). And, a public prosecutor (Sreenivasan) striving to punish a rapist.

== Cast ==
- Fahadh Faasil as Manu Krishna
- Isha Talwar as Asha, Manu's wife
- Sreenivasan as Advocate Mathan Tharakan
- Lal as Muhammed
- Nandu as Vakkachan
- VK Sreeraman
- Vijayakumar as CI
- Manikuttan as Sakkeer
- Mythili as Abhirami
- Baby Gadha as Manu's daughter
- Lena as Serena
- Vishnupriya as Lekha
- Usha as Muhammed's wife
- Anju Aravind as Mathan Tharakan's wife
- Lakshmipriya as Pushpa
- Santhakumari as Vakkachan's mother
- Molly Kanamaly (supporting role)
- Sudheer Karamana as Kunjikka
- Prashanth Alexander as Arjun
- Faisal Fareed as Sharjah Police Officer
- Daya Ashwathy as Reporter

== Soundtrack ==
Gopi Sundar composed the music. Jassie Gift sang the song "Chalanam".

Track name	Singers	Lyrics
" Mannil Pathiyum"	Vineeth Sreenivasan, Divya S Menon	Anu Elizabeth Jose
" Chalanam Chalanam"	Jassie Gift	Arun Gopinath

== Reception ==
The Times of India gave the film a rating of three-and-a-half out of five stars and wrote that "The movie, which has a few parallel narratives, has that deeply evocative humane quotient which makes each of its characters not just the leads, but also pure human beings". Rediff gave the film two out of five stars and stated that "God's Own Country is over-written -- characters explain everything in words when a mere change of expression would do".
