= Seconds (2014 film) =

- Directed by: Aneesh Upasana
- Written by: Shani Khader
- Produced by: Ajay Jose
- Starring: Jayasurya; Aparna Nair; Vinayakan; Vinay Forrt
- Cinematography: Suresh Rajan
- Edited by: Johnkutty
- Music by: Gopi Sunder
- Production company: Achu's International
- Release date: 5 December 2014
- Running time: 102 minutes
- Country: India
- Language: Malayalam

Seconds is a 2014 Indian Malayalam mystery-thriller film directed by Aneesh Upasana. The film stars Jayasurya, Aparna Nair, Vinayakan, Vinay Forrt, Ambika Mohan, Riyaz Khan, Anusree, Salim Kumar, Shankar Ramakrishnan and Indrans in prominent roles. It was released on 5 December 2014. The film was later dubbed into Tamil and released as Andha Sila Nimidangal (In Those Few Seconds).

The film is a multi-narrative, told in a non-linear format. The film cuts between present day, where the police officer on investigation asks for the whereabouts of the people who were in the lift and flashbacks, where their lives on the day leading up to the incident is shown.

== Plot ==
The film revolves around a murder that happens in the lift of a city apartment in Kochi. Four unrelated individuals are stuck in the lift. One ends up dead, two are stabbed and the fourth is arrested under suspicion of murder. The police officer on investigation, Bimal Vaas, leads the case. He interrogates Shivan Kutty, the lift technician who claims to be new and is unaware of any problems with the lift. The backstory of each one of the four young people in the lift is then told in flashbacks.

The first person is Teena, who is the only one safe and is arrested by the police. She is a playful young lady who left her family and came to the city in search of wealth and fame. However, she can only afford to live at a ladies' hostel and work at a new jewelry store in the city. During the store's grand opening, she meets Aby Thomas who offers her a better position as the manager at his own jewelry store. Teena's boss and co-worker advice her to ignore Aby's advances. However, she still phones Aby and he invites her to his apartment. After lying about her mother being sick, Teena leaves work early and rushes over to the apartment building to meet Aby.

The second person is Feroz, who in present-day is in critical condition at the hospital. He is a hot-tempered young photographer who was raised by his grandparents after his parents' death. They are desperate to get him married but he is preoccupied with saving up money to buy a new studio in the middle of the city. One evening, he takes a budding young actress, Sneha to meet his filmmaker buddy, Mahadevan. Sneha is a big fan of Mahadevan and asks Feroz to take a photograph of them together. On their way back to Feroz's studio, Mahadevan's jeep breaks down and Feroz tries to fix it. Meanwhile, Sneha is hit by an electric pole which kills her. Mahadevan fears that he will be implicated in Sneha's death and forces Feroz to leave the scene with him before anyone comes. Following the events of that fateful evening, Feroz realizes that he can blackmail Mahadevan for money by using the photograph he took of Mahadevan and Sneha on the day she died. Mahadevan cannot deal with any bad publicity at the moment since he is venturing into politics. Desperate, Mahadevan asks one of his gangster friends in Mumbai, Jeevan, for help. Jeevan hires an assassin in Kochi to kill Feroz. Mahadevan invites Feroz to his apartment building which is the same one as Aby's on the pretext of giving him the money he demands.

The third person is Veeramani, who is at present stable at the hospital. He is an unsuccessful insurance agent with low self-esteem who lives with his wife, Parvathy and their daughter. He is no longer in talking terms with his Iyer parents because he married a girl without their consent. Unknown to his family, he is going through depression and meets a psychologist to overcome his mental issues. Before returning home from work every day, he goes to the local cinema to clear his mind. Since he has never achieved his annual target, he goes around asking everyone he meets if they would like to buy his insurance policy, which makes him unpopular in his neighbourhood. After much difficulty, Veeramani manages to convince Mahadevan to become his latest client. He then goes to the same apartment building to meet Mahadevan on the same day to finalize the insurance agreement.

The final person is Thampi, who is the one who ends up dead in the lift. He is both a drug dealer and a drug user. He lives in the slums with his two wives and a young daughter. A few hours before his murder, he gets into a fight with the new police officer in the area and is jailed. Once he is released, he returns to the slums and gets high on drugs. He then gets a phone call from someone mysterious asking him to come the same apartment building for a job. Once in the lift, the lift gets stuck and the lights go off. When it is back on, Veeramani has been stabbed. Before anyone can react, the lights go off again and this time, Feroz is stabbed. Teena quickly notices that Thampi has a dagger in his hand and fatally hits him in the head with the emergency telephone. When the lift doors are finally opened, she is arrested by the police and is taken to the nearby station.

After checking the visitors book, Bimal learns that both Veeramani and Feroz were at the apartment building to meet Mahadevan. While being questioned, Mahadevan admits that he knows both Feroz and Veeramani and that they were both scheduled to meet him that day. However, he hides the fact that he and Feroz tried to cover up the truth behind Sneha's death. Bimal also learns that Thampi wrote down the number of an empty apartment in the visitors book, which means he was probably up to something suspicious. Also, the coroner's report indicate that he was on drugs before he was killed. Even more strange, he was from the slums where the crime rate is high. Bimal concludes that Thampi was probably high and became paranoid when the lift stopped working. He saw the two young men with him as dangerous and tried to kill them. Teena then attacked him in self-defense, unwittingly killing him. All the charges on her are dropped and she is released from police custody. Meanwhile, Feroz dies in the intensive care unit and Veeramani is discharged from the hospital.

A few days later, Veeramani is fully recovered. On the advice of his mother-in-law, who was told by the police that he is suffering from depression, Veeramani goes on a pilgrimage to Palani by bus. However, halfway through his journey, he gets down from the bus at Palakkad and gets into a limousine with Shivan Kutty and Jeevan. It is then revealed that Veeramani is actually the contract killer Mahadevan hired to kill Feroz. He has been leading a double life as a timid insurance agent to avoid suspicion. Shivan Kutty, who tampered with the lift on that day, is his partner in crime while Jeevan is their handler. Veeramani had pretended to be depressed and had Jeevan arrange for Mahadevan to buy his insurance policy on that day to cover his tracks. He was also the one who anonymously phoned Thampi on the pretext of needing drugs and gave him an empty apartment number to make him look suspicious. Mahadevan then summoned Feroz to the apartment at the same time so that Veeramani can carry out his plan. However, Teena had unexpectedly gotten into the lift. In reality, Veeramani had stabbed himself before stabbing Feroz. Teena and Thampi thought the other person was the killer and she ended up killing him. Veeramani, Jeevan and Shivan Kutty then head for the Coimbatore International Airport, where Veeramani is given his latest task. The screen then cuts to black.

== Cast ==
- Jayasurya as Veeramani
- Aparna Nair as Teena
- Vinay Forrt as Feroz
- Vinayakan as Thambi
- Ambika Mohan as Parvathy's mother
- Riyaz Khan as Aby Thomas
- Salim Kumar as Jeevan
- Abhija Sivakala as Thampi's wife
- Indrans as Shivan Kutty
- Shankar Ramakrishnan as Mahadevan
- Anusree as Parvathy
- Santhakumari
- Kalabhavan Haneef
- Meera Muralidharan as Sneha
- Anjali Aneesh as Haseena

== Music ==
Seconds

Soundtrack album by Gopi Sunder
- Released: 2015
- Recorded: 2014
- Genre: Film soundtrack
- Language: Malayalam
- Producer: Gopi Sunder

Gopi Sunder chronology
The Dolphins (2014)	Seconds (2015)
