= Oru Korean Padam =

Indian Malayalam-language drama film

- Poster
- Directed by: Sujith S. Nair
- Written by: P. N. Ajayakumar; Sujith S. Nair
- Produced by: S. Murugan; Selvan Thamalam
- Starring: Maqbool Salmaan; Jwang-ki-Ju
- Cinematography: Vipin Chandran
- Edited by: Pradeep Shankar
- Music by: Sreekumar Vasudev
- Production companies: Jesus Creations; Kochumaveli Films
- Release date: 14 November 2014
- Country: India
- Language: Malayalam

Oru Korean Padam (transl. A Korean film) is a 2014 Indian Malayalam-language drama film co-written and directed by Sujith S. Nair and starring Maqbool Salmaan and Jwang-ki-Ju.

== Plot ==
Kishore is a filmmaker who has directed the movie Turning Point, which is an unofficial remake of the Korean film Something Out of Nothing, by Jwang-ki-Ju. Since the Korean film was a failure but the Malayalam film was a success, Jwang-ki-Ju comes to Kerala to claim the rights for the film. At the same time, Kishore is trying to win over his love Eva and prove that he is successful. What happens next forms the rest of the story.

== Cast ==
- Maqbool Salmaan as Kishore Kumar
- Jwang-ki-Ju as Jwang-ki-Ju
- Tini Tom as Nandakumar
- Basil
- Mamukkoya
- Nandu
- Sunil Sukhada as Vijayan
- Chemban Vinod Jose as Peethambaran
- Indrans
- Balaji Sarma as Freddy
- Pradeep Kottayam
- Vineeth Mohan as Shameer
- Vava Suresh as himself
- Mithra Kurian as Eva
- Urmila Unni as Saramma
- Molly Kannamaly as Whitey
- Joy Mathew as himself
- M. A. Nishad as Adv. Prakash Mathew
- Saji Surendran as himself
- Diphan
- Lijo Jose Pellissery
- Syam Mohan

== Production ==
The film is directed by Sujith S. Nair, who previously co-directed Kaashh (2012). The film is based on how many Indian films copy Korean films without giving the original film due credit. Oru Korean Padam began production in September 2013. To prepare for the role, Maqbool Salmaan closely observed the mannerisms of assistant directors. Theatre actor Jwang-ki-Ju made his feature film debut through this film. The film was shot in Munnar and Thiruvananthapuram.

== Soundtrack ==
The music for the film is composed by Sreekumar Vasudev.

Track listing
No.	Title	Singer(s)	Length
1.	"Cinema Cinema"	Vasudeva Shanmugaraj, Anwar Sadath	4:44
2.	"Pournamipenninannu"	Vasudeva Shanmugaraj, K. J. Yesudas, Swetha Mohan	4:47
3.	"Sunday Monday"	Alex, Reshma Menon	3:52
Total length:			13:23

== Reception ==
Deepa Soman of The Times of India rated the film 2.5/5 and wrote, "It is a onetime watch for its theme, but the overall treatment and entertainment quotient is disappointing".
