= Central Theatre (film) =

- Directed by: Kiran Narayanan
- Written by: Kiran Narayanan
- Starring: Hemanth Menon; Sidhartha Siva; Arun A Kumar
- Cinematography: SunilKaimanam
- Music by: Ramesh narayan
- Production company: Thaaraaka Productions
- Release date: 26 September 2014
- Running time: 116 minutes
- Country: India
- Language: Malayalam

Central Theatre is a 2014 Malayalam suspense thriller film written and directed by Kiran Narayanan. The film stars Hemanth Menon, Sidhartha Siva, and Arun A Kumar as the protagonist.

== Cast ==
- Hemanth Menon as Sidharth Vijay
- Arun A Kumar as Vinay
- Sidhartha Siva as Aldrin Peter
- Fayis Salman as Nadeer
- Kozhikode Narayanan Nair as Vinay's grand father
- Majeed as Vinay's Father
- Anjali Aneesh Upasana aka Anjali Nair as Mariya John
- Ambika Mohan as Sidharth Vijay's mother
- Rosylynn as Vinay's mother
- Kaladi Omana as Vinay's grand mother
- Master Chethanlal as Amruth
- Master Abhinav as Sreekuttan
- Baby Prathyusha as Shruthi
- Baby Arunima as Diya
- Master Arun as Young Aldrin Peter

== Plot ==
The story revolves around a kidnaps a kid by a pedophile, subsequent investigation, and the simmering tension. The entire story happens in a span of six hours and is told in three different perspectives, in four different chapters.
