= Aneesh Upasana =

Indian film director, screenwriter and photographer

- Born: 6 December 1979 (age 46); Nilgiris, Tamil Nadu, India
- Occupation: Director
- Years active: 2012–present
- Spouse: Anjali Nair (Separated)
- Children: Avani Aneesh

Aneesh Upasana (born 6 December 1979) is an Indian film director, screenwriter and photographer. His feature films include Matinee (2012) and Seconds (2014).

== Career ==
Aneesh Upasana started his professional career as a fashion photographer for film magazines. He was recognised by the Limca Book of Records for recording the video album Mayamadhavam on a still digital camera.

He made his directorial debut with Matinee which released on 13 December 2012. The film, which featured Maqbool Salmaan making his feature film debut and Mythili in the lead roles, received generally positive reviews. Dalton L, reviewing for Deccan Chronicle, concluded his review, "Entrusted with a highly responsible job, debutant director Aneesh Upasana attempts to woo a wide audience, and ends up creating a drama with a split personality.". The director himself called the film "a great learning experience and a fine start for a debutant."

His second feature Seconds, which was written by Anoop Shivasenan, featured an ensemble cast that included Jayasurya, Aparna Nair, Vinay Forrt and Vinayakan. The film received a theatrical release on 5 December 2014 and received mixed reviews. Paresh C Palicha of Rediff gave the film 2 stars in a scale of 5 and wrote, "The main problem with Seconds is that it does not value the viewer's time." On the contrary, the reviewer from Sify wrote, "it is to the credit of the director that the film turns out to be a gripping entertainer" and called the film "worth the price of your ticket."

== Films ==
- Matinee (2012)
- Seconds (2014)
- Popcorn (2016)
- Janaki Jaane (2023)
