= Mathew Mattam =

Indian writer

Mathew Mattam (1950/1 – 29 May 2016) was a Malayalam writer who authored about 300 novels. His novels were regularly published in Mangalam Weekly, Manorama Weekly and other Malayalam periodicals. Anchu Sundarikal, Alippazham, Daivam Urangiyittilla, Profasarude Makal, Lakshamveedu and Roti are some of his major works. Two of his popular works - Karimbu and May Dinam - were made into movies. He died aged 65.

== Major works ==
- Mazhavillu (മഴവില്ല്)
- Policekarante Makal (പോലീസുകാരന്റെ മകള്‍)
- Veendum Vasantham (വീണ്ടും വസന്തം)
- Nisagandhi (നിശാഗന്ധി)
- Onpatham Pramaanam (ഒന്‍പതാം പ്രമാണം)
- Kaivishom (കൈവിഷം)
- Manavatti (മണവാട്ടി)
- Daivam Urangiyittilla (ദൈവം ഉറങ്ങിയിട്ടില്ല)
- Thadankal Palayam (തടങ്കല്പ്പാളയം)
- Karimbu (കരിമ്പ്)
- Profasarude Makal (പ്രൊഫസറുടെ മകള്‍)
- Anchu Sundarikal (അഞ്ചു സുന്ദരികള്‍)
- Alippazham(ആലിപ്പഴം)
- Roti (റൊട്ടി)
- May Dinam (മെയ് ദിനം)
- Lakshamveedu ലക്ഷം വീട്)
