= Santhosh Pandit =

Indian actor, producer and director

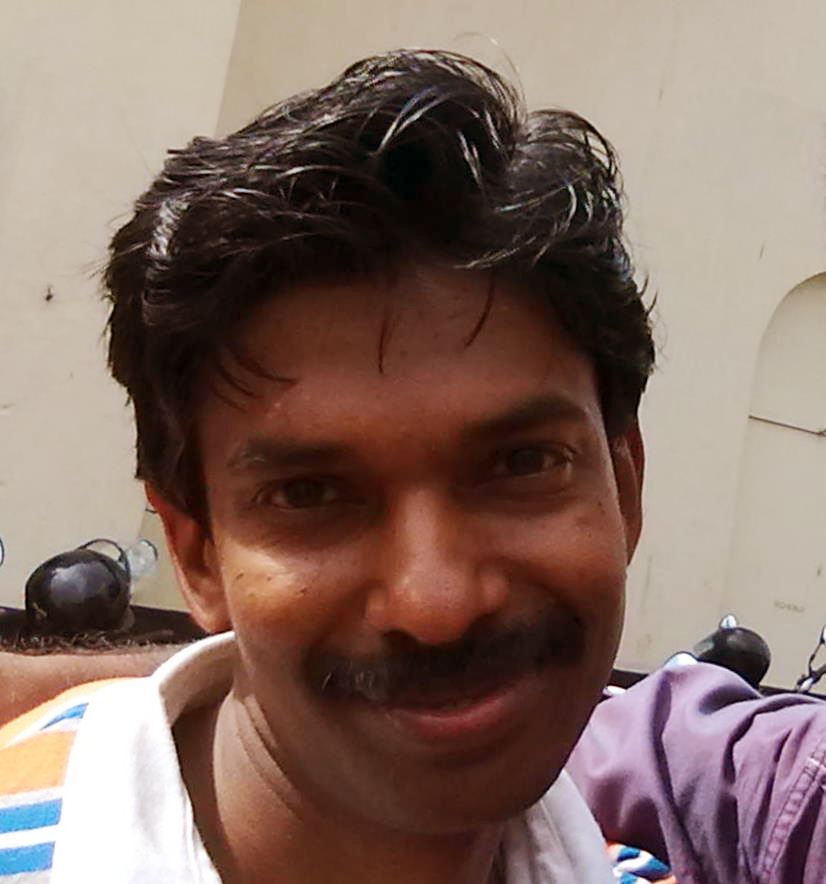
- Santhosh Pandit in 2021
- Born: Peruvannamuzhi, Kozhikode district, Kerala, India
- Occupations: Actor; composer; singer; editor; producer; screenwriter
- Years active: 2010 - present
- Children: 1

Santhosh Pandit is an Indian actor, producer, screenwriter, composer, singer, and film editor. He is best known for his 2011 low-budget film Krishnanum Radhayum and a music video of the same name which went viral.

== Career ==
Pandit's first movie, Krishnanum Radhayum, released on 21 October 2011, became an unexpected success in theatres. Some critics attribute the huge success of the film to the complex curiosity after the unprecedented harassment and negative comments posted on the YouTube clips related to the songs in the film. His second film was, Superstar Santhosh Pandit, where he again handled all the major departments in production.

Pandit appeared in the 2013–2014 Malayalam reality tv show Malayalee House aired on Surya TV. The hosts of the show decided to hold a public poll for eviction of housemates from the 5th week onward. Pandit, was eliminated in the 4th week by the housemates. Later the makers of the show admitted that evicting Santhosh Pandit was a mistake. Santhosh Pandit was returned to the show as a wild-card entry on 7 June 2013. On 19 July 2013 Pandit was again evicted from the show.

== Filmography ==
=== Director & Writer ===
Year	Title	Credits		Notes	Ref.
Year	Title	Director	Writer	Notes	Ref.
2011	Krishnanum Radhayum	Yes	Yes	Debut film	
2012	Superstar Santhosh Pandit	Yes	Yes		
2014	Minimolude Achan	Yes	Yes		
2014	Kalidasan Kavithayezhuthukayanu	Yes	Yes		
2016	Tintumon Enna Kodeeswaran	Yes	Yes		
2017	Neelima Nalla Kuttiyanu vs Chiranjeevi IPS	Yes	Yes		
2018	Urukku Satheeshan	Yes	Yes		
2019	Broker Premachandrante Leela Vilasangal	Yes	Yes		
2023	Athirayude Makal Anjali Chapter 1	Yes	Yes		
2023	Athirayude Makal Anjali Chapter 2	Yes	Yes		
2024	Kerala Live	Yes	Yes		

=== Actor ===
Year	Title	Character	Notes	Ref.
2011	Krishnanum Radhayum	John	Debut film	
2012	Superstar Santhosh Pandit	Jithu Bhai		
2014	Minimolude Achan	Aditya Varma		
2014	Kalidasan Kavithayezhuthukayanu	Kali		
2016	Tintumon Enna Kodeeswaran	Tintumon		
2017	Oru Cinemakkaran	As Himself		
2017	Masterpiece	College Peon		
2017	Neelima Nalla Kuttiyanu vs Chiranjeevi IPS	Chiranjeevi IPS & Aniruddh		
2018	Urukku Satheeshan	Chimpumon		
2019	Broker Premachandrante Leela Vilasangal	Premachandran		
2023	Athirayude Makal Anjali Chapter 1	Vinayan		
2023	Athirayude Makal Anjali Chapter 2	Vinayan		
2024	Kerala Live			
2026	Shardoola Vikreeditham	Don Baburaj		

=== Television ===
Year	Title	Character	Channel	Notes
2013	Malayalee House	contestant	Surya TV	Reality show
2020	Thinkalkalamaan	Vivek	Surya TV	TV series
2020-2021	Star Magic	Participant	Flowers TV	Game show
2022	Sundari	Jyotsyan	Surya TV	TV series
