= Matinee (2012 film) =

2012 Malayalam-language film by Aneesh Upasana

- Theatrical release poster
- Directed by: Aneesh Upasana
- Written by: Anil Narayanan
- Produced by: AOPL Entertainment
- Starring: Maqbool Salmaan; Mythili
- Cinematography: Pappinu
- Edited by: Nikhil Venu
- Music by: Gopi Sundar
- Production company: AOPL Entertainment
- Distributed by: AOPL Entertainment Release
- Release date: 13 December 2012
- Running time: 114 minutes
- Country: India
- Language: Malayalam

Matinee is a 2012 Indian Malayalam-language drama film directed by Aneesh Upasana and starring Maqbool Salmaan and Mythili in the lead roles. The film marks the directorial debut of still photographer Aneesh Upasana while Mammootty's nephew Maqbool Salmaan plays his first lead role. The story is about two person's journey to filmdom and how their life changes on one Friday's matinée show.

The film's lead role is played by Maqbool Salmaan who had earlier appeared in a short role in A. K. Saajan's Asuravithu. Maqbool is the nephew of noted actor Mammootty. He is the son of Ibrahimkutty, the younger brother of Mammootty who had been a popular star in the miniscreen. The film is produced by AOPL Entertainment which also launched Mammootty's son Dulquer Salmaan earlier the year through Second Show.

Matinee released on 13 December to positive reviews from critics and audiences. The film was appreciated for its realistic approach and the performances by lead actors.

== Plot ==
The plot of this film revolves around two people who come from different backgrounds but are united by fate. Najeeb is a youngster from an orthodox background who wishes to be a film star while Savithri is a motherless girl from an economically backward family who lands up in the film industry to escape her abusive father. The duo get a chance to be the lead pair in a film that appears to be an ordinary love story but turns out to be an adult film when it releases. The pair, subsequently, is ostracised from society. The duo eventually gets together and moves into the city to find the person responsible for the situation, who but turns out to have been caught in the blind by the actions of the director and producers of the film himself. Repenting and regretful of his hand in causing their predicament, he helps them find an apartment as well as finding them roles in the film industry, which mainly comes in the shape of some item song slots which Savithri fills, out of desperation as they need a certain income to maintain themselves in the city. These songs, and herself as a result become successful, turning her into a much sought after X rated movie phenom, which also comes with its share of controversy from moral pundits, while pushing her into her spiral of depression, which is in direct contrast to Najeeb who meanwhile have become unable to land a movie role, much less a lead, the first step toward his aspiration as a megastar. During one moment, Savithri bursts out, disillusioned by the state of cinema industry that they had heretofore seen with rose tinted lenses, now showing its ugly teeth, spitting them out, after using her for its success of sleaze fest films, and she passes out after ingesting a bottle of liquor, in the bathroom. Najeeb, starts falling in love with Savithri. Najeeb, later out of frustration seeing what his life has become, attempts suicide. Savithri soon thereafter bears Najeeb's daughter, staying within the cinema industry as an extra, after he had become paralysed waist down, caring for him for the rest of their life, peacefully married.

== Cast ==
- Maqbool Salmaan as Najeeb
- Mythili as Savithri
- Lena as Gayathri
- Thalaivasal Vijay as Moosahaji
- Dinesh Prabhakar as Selvan
- Valsala Menon as Savithri's Grandmother
- Sasi Kalinga as Gopi
- Kiran Raj as SI (actor)
- Soja Jolly as Nabeesa
- Fathima Babu as Fathima
- Anjali Aneesh
- Vishnu Unnikrishnan as Bappu
- Nitha Promy as Latha

== Music ==
The film features songs composed by Ratheesh Vegha and Bollywood composer Anand Raj Anand. Anand composed the song "Ayalathe Veetile" written by Vinukrishnan, an item number featuring Mythili. The song was a profound success and hit 4.5 lakh views on YouTube in just two weeks of its release. Gireesh Puthenchery's son Dinanath Puthenchery has penned the lyrics for two of the songs in the movie. Actress Kavya Madhavan has lent her voice to the song "Maunamayi Manassil" which was also well received among music critics.

No.	Title	Artist(s)	Length
1.	"Ayalathe Veettile"	Resmi Sateesh	3:58
2.	"Malabarin thalamai"	Thulasi	3:50
3.	"Maunamayi manassil"	Kavya Madhavan	3:54

== Release ==
The film's release was delayed by several weeks with a decision from the Kerala Film Exhibitors Association, who resisted the release of the film in their theatres. It was widely reported that an unofficial ban from the exhibitors came in the wake of AOPL-owned Carnival Cinemas, Angamaly not participating in a theatre strike organised by the Association. But AOPL maintained that the ban was based on a technical error as AOPL Entertainment is a separate private limited company and Carnival belongs to another company though both have some common investors. The ban was lifted after a discussion between AOPL and the Association and the film released on 13 December 2012.

== Reception ==
The film opened to mostly positive reviews from critics. Paresh C. Palicha of Rediff.com rated the film and said that the film "tackles a dark subject with much conviction." He concluded the review saying, "Matinee shows that there are many interesting avenues to explore if you want to tell the story of the film industry other than lampooning the superstars, Sreenivasan style." Dalton L. of Deccan Chronicle rated the film while appreciating the performances by the lead, editing, cinematography and music. The critic stated: "One occasionally stumbles upon a rotten canvas with strokes of a genius or a great canvas tarnished by splashes of awkwardness. Matinee is neither of the extremes; it simply appears to have been created either by two different painters or one with opposing moods / sensibilities."

Rating the film, Veeyen of Nowrunning.com said, "Matinee is a dark parable that splendidly traces the ever changing contours of human lives. It reaffirms that the human power of endurance is immense and that as individuals we wobble along alleys of hope, fear, distress, anger and regret before turning around and walking down the hope street all over again." IBN Live rated the film and said that the film "stands out for its realistic approach."

== Controversies ==
The film courted considerable controversy with the item number by Mythili. Another row originated when anti-tobacco activists turned against the film, thanks to the movie posters portraying Mythili with a lit cigarette and a bottle of booze. Activists of the Ernakulam district Anti-tobacco Council protested against the film and blackened several posters of the movie in the city. They also filed a petition before the police and the district collector against the movie posters. "When youngsters have slowly started quitting and keeping away from cigarettes, this movie has come up with posters of its actor with a cigarette. The movie-makers have failed to put up a statutory warning too. This certainly affects the awareness created by Kerala Voluntary Health Services and other anti-tobacco organisations," said K. S. Dilip Kumar, secretary of the Ernakulam district Anti-tobacco Council. A case was registered by the Health Department against Mythili and the producers of the film on 19 December.
