= Parayan Baaki Vechathu =

- Directed by: Karim
- Written by: Satheesh Muthukulam
- Produced by: Abbas Malayil
- Starring: Maqbool Salmaan; Anumol; Devika
- Cinematography: Madhu Ambat
- Edited by: Sobin K Soman
- Music by: Tej Mervin; Yusufali Kechery (lyrics)
- Production company: Charisma Films
- Release date: 28 February 2014
- Country: India
- Language: Malayalam

Parayan Baaki Vechathu is a 2014 Indian Malayalam political thriller film directed by Karim and starring Maqbool Salmaan, Anumol and Devika.

== Cast ==
- Maqbool Salmaan as Emmanuel
- Anumol as Alice
- Swasika
- Devika Nambiar
- Madhu
- Siddique
- Sai Kumar
- Irshad
- Balachandran Chullikkadu
- Mamukkoya
- Sathaar
- Zeenath
- Bindu Panicker
- Ambika Mohan
- Jayakrishnan
- Gopika Anil

== Production ==
It was Abbas's long-time dream to produce a film by Bharathan. This never happened and he is now back to the industry after three decades to produce a film which is directed by Bharathan's disciple Karim. Karim has previously directed movies titled "Ezharakkoottam", "Samoohyapaadam" and "Agni Nakshatram".

Mallika was initially cast as Maqbool's heroine but when she opted out, Anumol, who earlier acted in the internationally acclaimed feature Akam, was chosen for the role. Another important role is played by debutante actress Devika.
