= Maqbool Salmaan =

Indian film actor

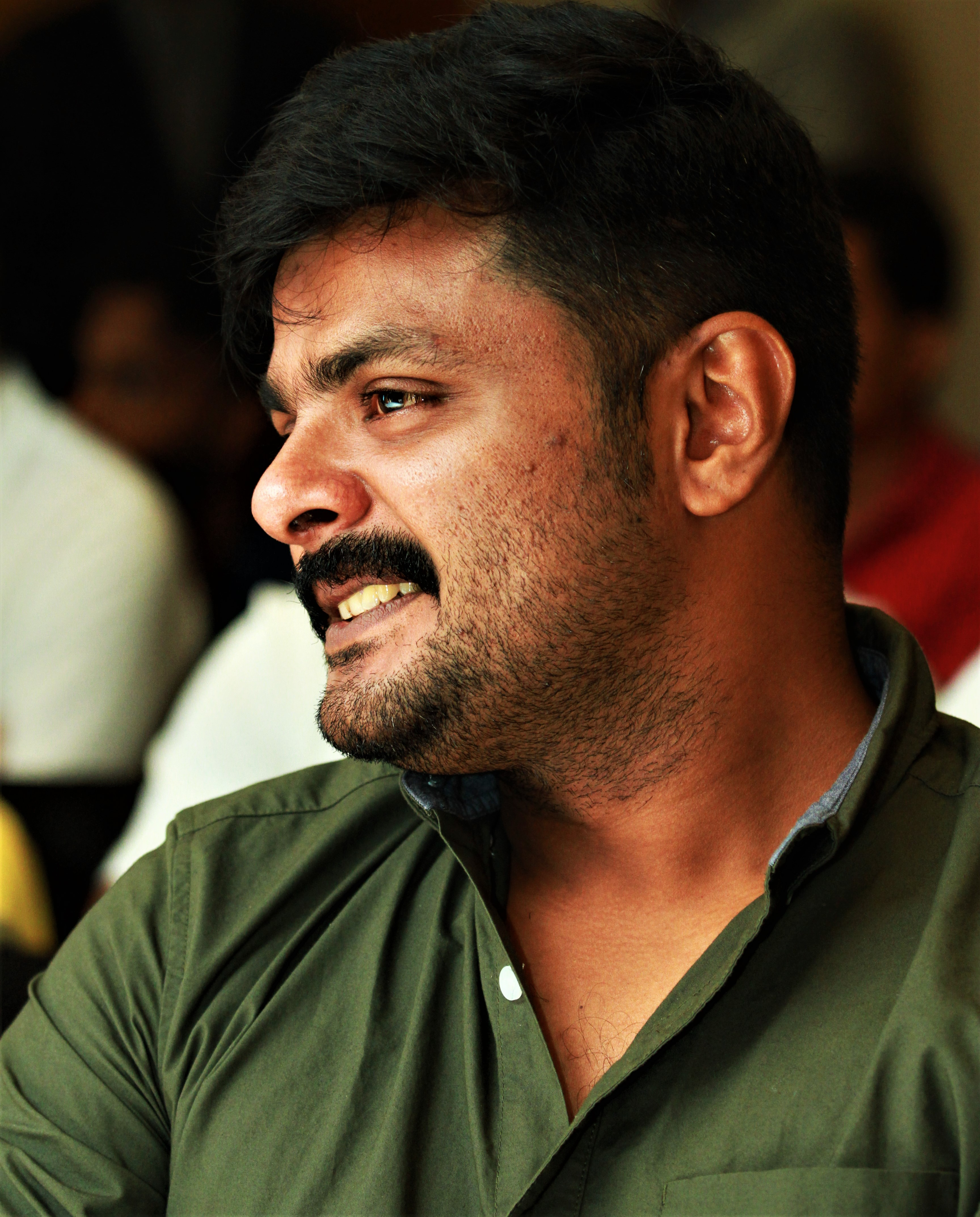
- Born: Vaikom, Kerala, India
- Education: Oxford College, Bangalore
- Occupation: Actor
- Years active: 2012–present
- Relatives: Mammootty family

Maqbool Salmaan is an Indian actor who appears in Malayalam films.

The son of television actor Ibrahimkutty and the nephew of actor Mammooty, Maqbool made his acting debut by playing a small role in A. K. Sajan's Asuravithu (2012). He later played the lead role in Aneesh Upasana's directorial debut film Matinee (2012).

== Early life and family ==
Maqbool Salmaan was born in Vaikom, Kottayam district, Kerala as the son of television actor P. I. Ibrahim Kutty and his wife Sameena. Maqbool has a sister, Tania Amjith. Maqbool attended the Labour India Gurukulam Public School, Marangattupilly, Kottayam. He graduated with a bachelor's degree in Hotel Management from the Oxford College, Bangalore. Being the nephew of film star Mammootty, Maqbool had a passion towards acting since his school days.

== Career ==
After completing his graduation, Maqbool decided to take up acting seriously. He never wanted to use his uncle's identity and fame to make his entry into cinema. So, like any other actor, he began appearing for auditions. He was chosen by Ranjan Pramod for a film; however, it failed to take off. He then approached director Fazil, who was looking for new faces for the film Living Together, but was rejected a role. He struggled for over a year to finally get a chance in a film by A. K. Saajan, who cast him in the lead role. When this project shelved due to some technical reasons, Saajan approached Maqbool again with the script of Asuravithu. who signed it without any hesitation. He was cast in a short but important role in this action flick which starred Asif Ali in the lead role. The film was not a commercial success. but Maqbool's performance garnered appreciation.

The acclaim Maqbool gained through Asuravithu helped still photographer Aneesh Upasana choose him for the lead role in Matinee, which would mark the latter's directorial debut. The film was produced by AOPL Entertainment, which had earlier that year successfully launched Maqbool's cousin Dulquer Salmaan through Second Show. Matinee opened to positive reviews from critics and audiences alike and was declared a hit. Maqbool also won positive feedback for his performance, with the critic from Rediff saying: "Maqbool's 'the guy next door' look in the film lend authenticity to the character he plays."

His third film was Parayan Baaki Vechathu, released in 2014, a political thriller by Karim, who had earlier directed Agni Nakshatram. Anumol was Maqbool's heroine in the film. In 2018, he acted again with Mammootty in Abrahaminte Santhathikal in which he played a negative role.

== Filmography ==
Year	Title	Role	Notes
2012	Asuravithu	Messi	Debut
2012	Matinee	Najeeb	
2014	Parayan Baaki Vechathu	Emmanuel	
2014	Hangover	Aby	
2014	Day Night Game	Arjun	
2014	Oru Korean Padam	Kishore Kumar	
2014	Kerala Today	Munna	
2015	1000 – Oru Note Paranja Katha	Henchman	
2016	Pachakallam	Abhi	
2016	Poi Maranju Parayathe	Joe	
2016	Appuram Bengal Ippuram Thiruvithamkoor	Siby	
2016	Kasaba	Jagan	
2016	Dooram	Dennis	
2017	Masterpiece	Mahesh Raj	
2018	Abrahaminte Santhathikal	Arun	
2019	Maffi Dona	Vivek	
2021	Perunnalppadi		Short film
2021	Kadhal Neram	Surya	Short film
2022	Triangle	James	Short film
2022	Sethu	Vishnu	
2023	Kirkkan	PC Maathan	
2023	Akasham Kadann	Fazal	
2023	Rani		
2024	Agathokakological	Ajith Kumar	
2024	Gumasthan	Ravi	
2025	Aghosham	Adv. Michael	
2026	Ankam Attahasam		
