= Funny Nights with Pearle Maaney =

Indian television show

- Genre: Talk show
- Presented by: Pearle Maaney (Replaced by); Suraj Venjaramoodu & Malavika Krishnadas
- Starring: Celebrities & Notable Individuals in Malayalam Cinema
- Music by: Sreejish, Akbar, Libin, Swetha Ashok and Narayani Gopan
- Country of origin: India
- Original language: Malayalam
- No. of episodes: 64

Production
- Camera setup: Multi-camera
- Running time: 45 minutes

Original release
- Network: Zee Keralam
- Release: 14 March 2020 – 4 May 2021

Funny Nights with Pearle Maaney is an Indian Malayalam-language comedy chat and game show which premiered on 14 March 2020. It airs on Zee Keralam every Saturday and Sunday at 9 pm and on ZEE5 before TV telecast.

== Host ==
- Pearle Maaney : Malayalam Shows Host, reality shows like Nayika Nayakan, D 4 Dance, Taste of Kerala, Bigg Boss Malayalam on Television and films like last supper, Who, Ludo to her credits. (Episode 1-28)
- Suraj Venjaramoodu : National Award-winning Malayalam actor known for Comedy and Character roles along with several Television shows as host( Episode 29-)
- Malavika Krishnadas : Dancer, Television host and actress known for Super dancer season 2, Nayika Nayakan, D5 and Indulekha (2020 TV series). ( Episode 29-)
- Shweta Menon : Former model, actress and television personality (Episode 48 -)

== Cast ==
Apart from Pearle, comedians like :

- Manoj Guinness
- Sudheer Paravoor
- Binu Adimaly
- Naseer Sankranthi
- Devi Chandana
- Sneha Sreekumar
- Reshmi
- Manju Vijeesh

Are also a part of the show.

== List of Episodes ==
Episodes	Celebrities	Notes	Telecast date
1	Jayasurya	Namitha Pramod as surprise guest	14 Mar 2020
2	Guinness Pakru	Namitha Pramod as surprise guest	15 Mar 2020
3	Kalabhavan Shajohn, Tini Tom		21 Mar 2020
4	Suraj Venjaramoodu		22 Mar 2020
5	Prajod, Sudheesh		28 Mar 2020
6	Govind Padmasoorya		29 Mar 2020
7	Suraj Venjaramoodu		4 Apr 2020
8	Bheeman Raghu		5 Apr 2020
9	Shakeela	Santhosh Pandit as Chief guest	11 Apr 2020
10	Bibin George, Prayaga Martin		12 Apr 2020
11	Bheeman Raghu Prajod		18 Apr 2020
12	Dharmajan Bolgatty, Ramesh Pisharody		20 June 2020
13	Dharmajan Bolgatty, Ramesh Pisharody		21 Jun 2020
14	Salim Kumar, Shafi		27 Jun 2020
15	Tini Tom, Vinay Forrt		28 Jun 2020
16	Ranjini Haridas, Ranjini Jose		4 Jul 2020
17	Tini Tom, Bijukuttan		5 Jul 2020
18	Vijay Babu, M. Jayachandran		11 Jul 2020
19	Manju Pillai, Subi Suresh		12 Jul 2020
20	Kalabhavan Shajohn, Kottayam Naseer		18 Jul 2020
21	Sharafudheen		19 Jul 2020
22	Bala	Bijukuttan	25 Jul 2020
23	Gayathri Suresh		1 Aug 2020
24	Ramesh Pisharody		2 Aug 2020
25	Saniya Iyappan		8 Aug 2020
26	Tini Tom & Bijukuttan		9 Aug 2020
27	Subi Suresh & Manju Pillai		16 Aug 2020
28	Srinish Aravind & Shiyas Kareem		23 Aug 2020
29	Ramesh Pisharody		29 Aug 2020
30	Ramesh Pisharody		29 Aug 2020
31	Sreenath Bhasi & Balu Varghese		29 Aug 2020
32	Baby & Mary	Satheesh & Sanjeev	6 Sept 2020
33	Pauly Valsan	Akhil & Team skit	12 sept 2020
34	Kottayam Ramesh		13 Sept 2020
35	Muhammed Fayaz & Supriya Anoop		19 Sept 2020
36	—N/a		20 sept 2020
37	—N/a		26 sept 2020
38	—N/a		27 sept 2020
39	T.S.Raju		4 Oct 2020
40	Salu Kuttanad		11 Oct 2020
41	Chembil Ashokan		18 Oct 2020
42	Saji & Nita		25 Oct 2020
43	Nandu Poduwal		1 Nov 2020
44	Elsy		8 Oct 2020
48-	—N/a	Turned into Kids program	December 2020 – Present
