= Pearle Maaney =

Indian actress and YouTuber

- Pearle Maaney
- Born: 28 May 1989 (age 37); Aluva, Kerala, India
- Education: Christ University, Bangalore
- Occupations: Actress; Lyricist; Singer; YouTuber; Television presenter
- Years active: 2011–present
- Spouse: Srinish Aravind (m. 2019)
- Children: 2

YouTube information
- Channel: Pearle Maaney
- Genres: Celebrity interviews, Lifestyle, Motivation, Web series, Couple Vlogs
- Subscribers: 4.62 million
- Views: 2.1 billion
- Last updated: July 2026

Pearle Maaney (/maːɳi/; born 28 May 1989) is an Indian actress, lyricist, YouTuber, and television presenter who works in Malayalam shows. She is known for co-hosting three seasons of the Malayalam dance reality show D 4 Dance. Pearle emerged as the first runner-up of the Big Boss Malayalam season 1.

== Early life ==
Pearle Maaney was brought up in a Syro-Malabar Syrian Christian joint family based in Kochi with roots in Chowara. She did her schooling at Holy Angel's Convent Thiruvananthapuram, and Rajagiri Public School, Kalamassery, and completed her graduation in Media Studies from Christ University, Bangalore. Her parents are based in Thrissur.

== Career ==
Pearle has anchored over 250 episodes of the music show Yes Jukebox on the Malayalam television channel Yes Indiavision, a subsidiary of Indiavision. She hosted Taste of Kerala, a travel-based cookery show on Amrita TV under the stage name Serah.

In October 2014, she started hosting the dance reality show GumOn D2 on Mazhavil Manorama, replacing host Jewel Mary. Her co-host was Govind Padmasoorya. She also hosted season 2 of the Kaumudy TV programme Cinema Company. In 2018, she contested in the first season of the reality show Bigg Boss on Asianet and emerged as the runner-up. She was the only female contestant to complete 100 days.

== Personal life ==
During season one of the Bigg Boss reality show in 2018, she got involved in a romantic relationship with her co-contestant Srinish Aravind, and both of them expressed their wish to get married. On 17 January 2019, Maaney got engaged to Srinish Aravind at a private ceremony. On 5 May 2019, the couple got married as per Christian customs and on 8 May 2019, they had a Hindu wedding ceremony as well. They have two daughters, Nila and Nitara, born on 20 March 2021 and 13 January 2024.

== Filmography ==
=== Films ===
Year	Film	Role	Notes	Ref.
2013	Neelakasham Pachakadal Chuvanna Bhoomi	Biker Girl		
2014	The Last Supper	Pearley		
2014	Njaan	Valli		
2015	Loham	Bride		
2015	Double Barrel	She		
2015	Jo and the Boy	Mithu		
2016	Kalyana Vaibhogame	Vaidehi	Telugu film	
2016	Pretham	Suhannisa		
2016	Kappiri Thuruthu	Yami		
2017	Team 5	Suresh Aleena		
2017	Pullikkaran Staraa	Angelina		
2018	Who	Dolores	English/ Malayalam; Bilingual film	
2020	Ludo	Sheeja Thomas	Hindi film Released on Netflix	
2022	Valimai	Christina	Tamil film	
2023	Queen Elizabeth	Celebrity		
2025	Detective Ujjwalan	Divya	Cameo	

=== Short films ===
Year	Film	Role	Ref.
2015	Punchirikku Parasparam	Biker Girl	
2017	Hand of God	Herself (car girl)	
2023	The delay	Neighbour	

=== Television ===
==== As host ====
Year	Show	Channel	Notes
2008	Yes Jukebox	Indiavision	
2010–2012	Taste of Kerala	Amrita TV	Credited as "Serah"
2014	D 4 Dance	Mazhavil Manorama	Replaced Jewel Mary Co-host with Govind Padmasoorya
2014–2015	D2 – D4 Dance	Mazhavil Manorama	Co-host with Govind Padmasoorya
2015–2016	Cinema Company Season 2	Kaumudy TV	
2015	IIFA Utsavam	Sun TV Network	With Suraj Venjaramoodu
2015	Ranipadminimar	Mazhavil Manorama	
2015	Kavyakkoppam GPyum Pearleyum	Mazhavil Manorama	
2016	D3 – D4 Dance	Mazhavil Manorama	Co-host Adil Ibriham
2016	D 4 Dance Reloaded	Mazhavil Manorama	Co-host Adil Ibriham
2016–2017	Katturumbu	Flowers	
2017	Flowers TV Awards 2017	Flowers	Award Show
2017	2nd IIFA Utsavam	Surya TV	With Tini Tom
2017–2018	Manya Maha Janangale	Kairali TV	Also as judge
2018–present	Pearle Maaney Show	YouTube	Pearle Productions
2017	Tamaar Padaar	Flowers	Replaced by Lakshmi Nakshathra
2018	Mirchi Music Awards South	Asianet	Award show
2018	Asianet Comedy Awards	Asianet	Award show
2018	Asianet Television Awards 2018	Asianet	Award show
2018	Midukki	Mazhavil Manorama	
2018	Amma Mazhavillu Vilambaram	Mazhavil Manorama	
2018	Nayika Nayakan	Mazhavil Manorama	replaced by Aswathy Sreekanth
2019	8th South Indian International Movie Awards	Surya TV	Award show
2019–2020	Dance Jodi Dance 3.0	Zee Tamizh	Tamil reality show Co-host with Deepak Dinkar
2020	Funny Nights with Pearle Maaney	Zee Keralam	Replaced by Suraj Venjaramoodu and relaunched as Funny nights
2020	Lockdown talks	YouTube	Quarantine special show
2021	10th South Indian International Movie Awards	Surya TV	Award show with Govind Padmasoorya
2022	Cook with Comedy	Asianet	

==== Other roles ====
Year	Show	Role	Channel	Notes
2011–2012	Chumma	Serah	Amrita TV	TV series
2015	Thengakola Mangatholi	Herself with Govind Padmasoorya	Mazhavil Manorama	Music album
2015	Celebrate Happiness	Herself	Mazhavil Manorama	Music video
2016	Deshadanakili Karayarila	Herself	Mazhavil Manorama	Video album
2017	Hand of God	Herself as Car Girl	Mazhavil Manorama	Short film
2017	Minute to Win it	Participant	Game show	
2018	Bigg Boss (Malayalam season 1)	Herself as a contestant	Asianet	1st Runner-up
2018–2019	Pearlish season 1,2	Pearle with Srinish Aravind	YouTube	Music Album / Web series
2019	Oru Kuthu Kadha	Pearle with Srinish Aravind / Shiyas Kareem	YouTube	Music Album / Web series
2020	Kitchen, Khanna & Konversation Season 3	Chef	Hotstar	Cookery show
2020	Plastic&Elastic	Plas	YouTube	Web series
2020	Avastha	Aishwarya	YouTube	Web series
2020	Chellakuttiye	Aishwarya	YouTube	Tamil Music album
2021	Maveli	Herself	Netflix	Short film

== Discography ==
Year	Song	Film	Lyricist	Singer	Composer	Language	Notes
2014	"Belly Song"	The Last Supper	No	Yes	Gopi Sundar	Arabic	
2016	"Pal Pal"	Kalyana Vaibhogame	No	Yes	Kalyan Koduri	Telugu	Rahul Nambiar (co-singer)
2018	"Title Song"	Pearle Maaney Show (web series)	Yes	Yes	Gopi Sundar	English	
2018	"Fly with You"	Pearlish (web series)	Yes	Yes	Jecin George	Tamil	Jecin George (co-singer)
2019	"Who are You"	Who	Yes	No	Mangal Suvarnan	English	
2019	"Lonely Lake"	Who	Yes	No	Manikandan Ayyappa	English	
2019	"Munnale Ponale"	Oru Adaar Love	Yes	No	Shaan Rahman	Tamil	
2020	"Chellakuttiye"	Avastha (web series)	Yes	No	Jecin George	Tamil	
2020	"Chellakannane"	Music Video	Yes	Yes	Jecin George	Tamil	Jecin George (co-singer)
2021	"Crazy World"	Music Video	Yes	Yes	Jecin George	English	
