= Malavika Krishnadas =

Indian television actress

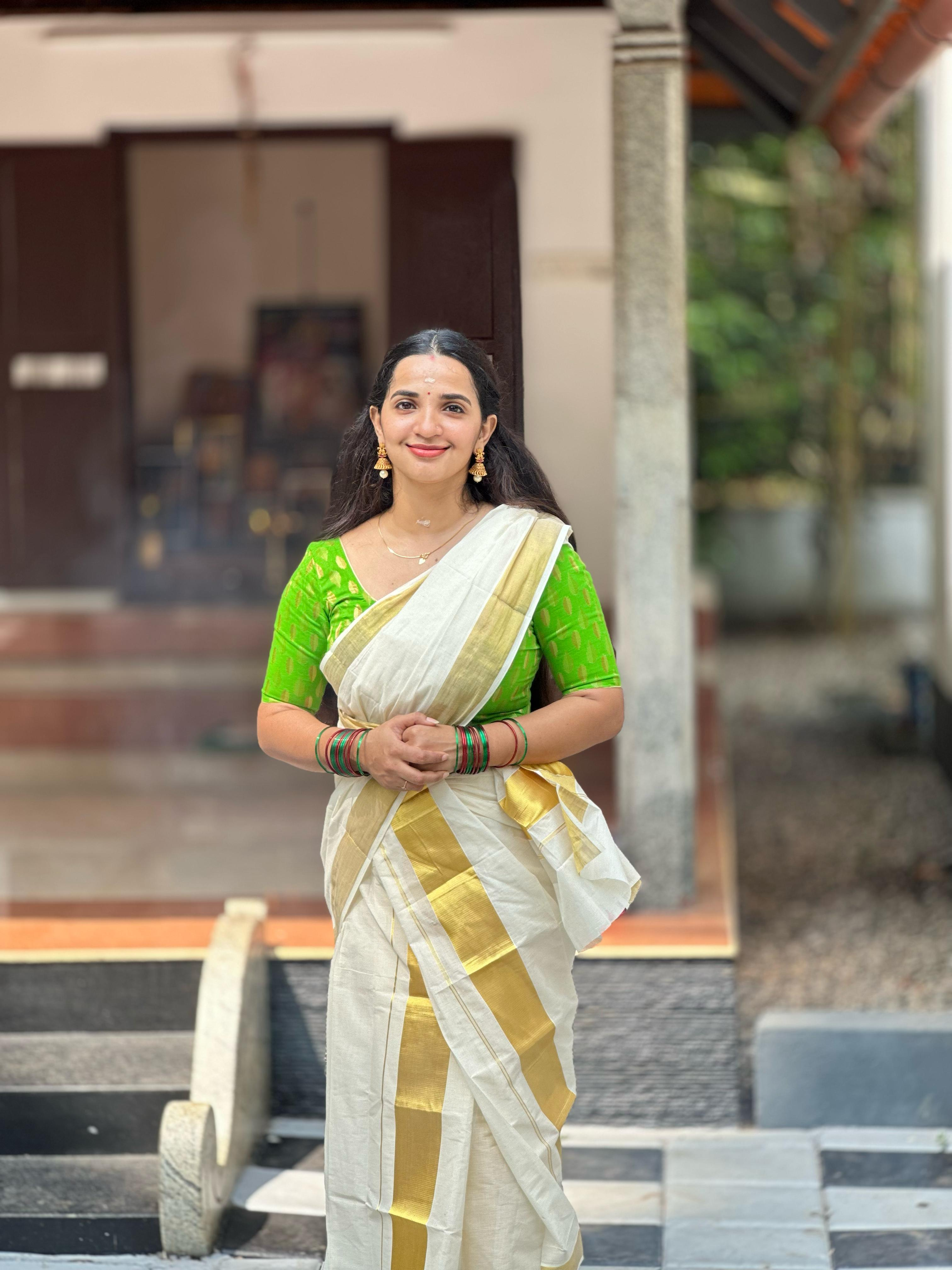
- Born: 1998 or 1999 (age 27–28); Ottapalam, Kerala, India
- Education: Sacred Heart College, Thevara
- Occupations: Actress; host; classical dancer; YouTuber
- Years active: 2010–present
- Spouse: Thejus Jyothi (m. 2023)
- Children: 1

YouTube information
- Channel: Malavika Krishnadas
- Years active: 2017–present
- Genres: Lifestyle, Motivation, Vlogs
- Subscribers: 1.77 million
- Views: 1.26 billion
- Last updated: December 2025

Malavika Krishnadas is an Indian actress, television presenter and classical dancer. After becoming the second runner-up in the 2018 Malayalam talent-hunt reality show Nayika Nayakan, she played the lead role in the television serial Indulekha from 2020 to 2021.

== Early life ==
Malavika was born in Ottapalam to Usha, a housewife, and Krishnadas, a businessman. She was brought up in Pattambi. She started learning classical dance at the age of three.

Malavika did her schooling at Carmel CMI School, Shornur, and at T R K Higher Secondary School, Vaniyamkulam, Palakkad. She then trained in Bharatanatyam under Vannadil Pudiyaveettil Dhananjayan and Shanta Dhananjayan. Later she pursued her bachelor's degree in Business from Sacred Heart College, Kochi.

== Career ==
Malavika started her career through the television dance reality show Super Dancer Junior 2 on Amrita TV. She was one of the finalists and became the runner-up of the show. She lost her father when in Grade VII during her first gulf dance show. Then she went on to be part of Munch Dance Dance telecasted on Asianet. She was a regular participant on dance competitions in Kerala State Kalotsav and won the first prize at state level in Bharatanatyam when she was in Class X.

She returned to mini-screen as a contestant on Nayika Nayakan (2018), a talent-hunt reality show telecasted on Mazhavil Manorama. The show was a breakthrough in her career as she became the second runner-up and also bagged the best dancer title. She made her movie debut in the same year through Thattumpurath Achuthan directed by Lal Jose. She then became part of a web series Life jor and a musical album Mizhi randilum.

She started her career as a television host through D5 Junior on Mazhavil Manorama as she replaced her Nayika Nayakan co-contestant Vincy Aloshious to anchor the show. She then went on to anchor Funny Nights on Zee Keralam along with Suraj Venjaramood. Her debut serial was Amme Mahamaye on Surya TV in 2016. She played the female lead in television serial Indulekha on Surya TV.

== Personal life ==
Malavika married her Nayika Nayakan co-contestant Thejus Jyothi in 2023.They have a daughter Rutvi Thejus

== Filmography ==
=== Films ===
Year	Film	Role	Notes	Ref.
2018	Thattumpurath Achuthan	Shruthi		
2026	Madhuvidhu	-	Co-producer	

=== Television ===
Year	Show	Role	Channel	Notes	Ref.
2011	Super Dancer Junior 2	Contestant	Amrita TV	Runner-up	
2012	Munch Dance Dance	Contestant	Asianet	Runner-up	
2016	Amme Mahamaye	Kurup's daughter	Surya TV		
2018	Nayika Nayakan	Contestant	Mazhavil Manorama	Second runner-up	
2019	D5 Junior	Host	Mazhavil Manorama	Replacing Vincy Aloshious	
2020–2021	Indulekha	Indulekha Ramanadha Menon	Surya TV		
2020–2021	Funny Nights	Host	Zee Keralam	Co-host with Suraj Venjaramood	
2022–2023	Star Comedy Magic	Contestant	Flowers TV		
2022–2023	Dancing Stars	Contestant	Asianet		

==== Special appearances ====
Year	Show	Role	Channel	Notes	Ref.
2018	Thakarppan Comedy	Guest	Mazhavil Manorama	Finalists of Nayika Nayakan	
2019	Onnum Onnum Moonu	Guest	Mazhavil Manorama	Promoting Thattumpurath Achuthan	
2020	Swantham Sujatha	Indulekha	Surya TV	Cameo in promo	
2020	Jingle Bells with Minnum Tharangal	Guest	Surya TV		
2021	Anchinodu Inchodinchu	Indulekha	Surya TV	Cameo in promo	
2022	My G Flowers Oru Kodi	Contestant	Flowers TV		
2022	Orukodi Malsararthikalude Samsthana Sammelanam	Guest	Flowers TV		
2022	Social Media Awards	Guest	Flowers TV		
2024	Star Singer (Season 9)	Dancer	Asianet		

=== Webseries ===
Year	Series	Role	Notes	Ref.
2019	Life Jor	Various roles		

=== Music videos ===
Year	Title	Singer(s)	Label	Ref.
2019	Mizhi Randilum	K. S. Harisankar, Anne Amie	OLDream Pictures	
