= Nirav =

Nirav or Neerav (originally Sanskrit) means "quiet or calm."

The name Neerav is derived from Sanskrit. In Hindu origin, the meaning of name Neerav is "silent". This name commonly used by Hindus. It is widely used in Bengali, Gujarati, Punjabi, Sanskrit, and Malayalam. The name is used not only in India but also in Nepal.

== People ==
- Neerav Bavlecha, Indian professional dancer and choreographer. He judged popular Malayalam dance reality series titled D 4 Dance
- Nirav Shah, Indian cinematographer
- Nirav D. Shah, American epidemiologist, economist and attorney, known for being Maine CDC director during COVID-19 pandemic
