= Reena Basheer =

Indian film actress and dancer

- Occupations: Actress, dancer, TV personality
- Years active: 2007 - Present

Reena Basheer is an Indian actress and dancer. She works in the Malayalam film industry and she's a well known personality among Malayalee audience through cookery shows and as well as an anchor.

== Career ==
She made her film debut in the Malayalam film Mulla in 2008 and later appeared in many movies. She won the Second Best Actress Award at the Kerala State Television Awards 2016 for her serial, Pokkuveyil.

== Filmography ==
| Year | Title | Role | Notes |
|---|---|---|---|
| 2008 | Mulla | Malathi | |
| 2008 | Pakal Nakshatrangal | Dr. Usha | |
| 2008 | Nurunguvettangal | Meera | Tele-film for Amrita TV |
| 2009 | 2 Harihar Nagar | Janaki | |
| 2010 | In Ghost House Inn | Janaki | |
| 2010 | Aagathan | Rakhi | |
| 2011 | Violin | Mercy | |
| 2011 | Traffic | Sudevan's wife | |
| 2012 | Face to Face | Shobha | |
| 2012 | Father's Day | Geetha | |
| 2012 | The King & the Commissioner | Dr. Mercy Mathew | |
| 2012 | Kochi to Kodambakkam | Devaki | |
| 2013 | Pigman | Dr. Jayalekshmi | |
| 2013 | Pullipulikalum Aattinkuttiyum | Lizy | |
| 2013 | Lokpal | Nandagopal's mother | |
| 2013 | Honey Bee | Abu's mother | |
| 2013 | Bharya Athra Pora | Zeenath | |
| 2013 | Lillies of March | Devika | |
| 2013 | Breakfast | Amma | Short film |
| 2014 | Money Ratnam | Salomi | |
| 2014 | Hangover | Molly | |
| 2014 | You Can Do | Kanakam | |
| 2015 | Mariyam Mukku | Clara | |
| 2016 | Yathra Chodikkathe | Indira | |
| 2017 | Chunkzz | Mary | |
| 2017 | Munthirivallikal Thalirkkumbol | Ulahannan's friend | |
| 2018 | School Diary | Chithra | |
| 2019 | Marconi Mathai | Mary Babu | |
| 2022 | Koshichayante Parambu | - | |
| TBA | Solomonte Manavatti Sophia | - | |

== Television ==
| Year | Title | Role | Channel | Notes |
|---|---|---|---|---|
| 2007 | Vanitharatnam | Herself as Contestant | Amrita TV | Reality show |
| 2008–2011 | Taste of Kerala | Host | Amrita TV | Cookery show |
| 2013–2016 | Taste Time | Host | Asianet | Cookery show |
| 2013 | Ruchibedam | Host | ACV | Cookery show |
| 2013 | Munch Stars | Co-Host | Asianet | Reality Show |
| 2015–2016 | Kutttkalavara | Mentor | Flowers TV | Reality Show |
| 2016 | Pokkuveyil | Sabitha Ravi | Flowers TV | Serial |
| 2016–2017 | Nilavum Nakshathrangalum | | Amrita TV | Serial |
| 2018 | Ennu Swantham Jani | | Surya TV | Serial |
| 2018 | Makkal | Maya | Mazhavil Manorama | Serial |
| 2018 – 2019 | Swathi Nakshatram Chothi | Vedha's mother | Zee Keralam | Serial |
| 2020 | Kutty Chef | Judge | Kairali TV | Reality show |
| 2024 | Home | Yashoda | Flowers TV | Serial |
| 2024 | Onakalavara season 5 | Host | Asianet | Cookery show |

=== Other Shows ===
As Guest

- Nammal Thammil (Asianet)
- Entertainment News (Asianet News)
- Varthaprabhatham (Asianet News)
- Don't Do Don't Do (Asianet Plus)
- India Voice (Mazhavil Manorama)
- Celluloid (Manorama News)
- Smart Show (Flowers TV)
- Flowers TV Awards (Flowers TV)
- Rhythm (Kairali TV)
- Ente Priyaganangal (Surya TV)
- Flowers Oru Kodi (Flowers TV)

== Endorsements ==
- നിറപറ
- Radhas Soap
- Thomson Multiwood
- Ruchi
- KSFE
