= Prasanna Sujit =

Indian dance choreographer

- Born: 8 July 1976 (age 49); Chennai, Tamil Nadu
- Occupation: Dance choreographer
- Years active: 2001- present

Prasanna Sujit (also known as Prasanna Master) is an Indian dance choreographer who primarily works in South Indian cinemas. He has choreographed dance sequences for various south Indian films. He has won Kerala State Film Award for Best Choreography, three times.

== Early life ==
Prasanna was born to K Chandramohan and Hemalatha in Chennai, Tamil Nadu. Dance choreographers Kala Master, Brinda Master and Girija Master are his aunts.

He did his schooling from Holy Angels and Adarsh Senior secondary school in Tamil Nadu.

He is married to Sudha Rao and has a son, Sai Shiva Krish.

== Career ==
He started his career in 1992 assisting his relatives K.S.Raghuram, Kala Master and Brinda Master by assisting them for 7 years as a choreographer.

== Reality Shows ==
Program	Language	Channel	Role
D4 Dance	Malayalam	Mazhavil Manorama	Judge
Super Dancer Junior	Malayalam	Amrita TV	Judge
Super Dancer 3	Malayalam	Amrita TV	Judge
Lets Dance 1	Malayalam	Amrita TV	Judge
DKD Season 2	Malayalam	Zee Keralam	Judge
Aattam Paattam	Tamil	Kalaignar TV	Judge
Oadi Vilayaadu Pappa -1/7/8	Tamil	Kalaignar TV	Judge
Comedy Stars	Malayalam	Mazhavil Manorama	Judge
Super Jodi	Malayalam	Surya TV	Judge

== Awards and honours ==
Year	Award category	Winner	Ref.
2017	Kerala State Film Award for Best Choreography	Hey Jude	
2018	Kerala State Film Award for Best Choreography	Aravindante Athidhikal	
2019	Kerala State Film Award for Best Choreography	Marakkar: Arabikadalinte Simham	
