= Trance (2020 film) =

2020 Indian film directed by Anwar Rasheed

- Theatrical release poster
- Directed by: Anwar Rasheed
- Written by: Vincent Vadakkan
- Produced by: Anwar Rasheed
- Starring: Fahadh Faasil; Gautham Vasudev Menon; Nazriya Nazim; Dileesh Pothan; Chemban Vinod Jose; Soubin Shahir; Sreenath Bhasi; Vinayakan
- Cinematography: Amal Neerad
- Edited by: Praveen Prabhakar
- Music by: Songs: Jackson Vijayan; Vinayakan; Score: Jackson Vijayan; Sushin Shyam
- Production company: Anwar Rasheed Entertainments
- Distributed by: A & A Release & Tricolor Entertainment
- Release date: 20 February 2020 (India)
- Running time: 170 minutes
- Country: India
- Language: Malayalam
- Budget: ₹35 crore

Trance is a 2020 Indian Malayalam-language neo-noir psychological thriller film directed and produced by Anwar Rasheed and written by Vincent Vadakkan. It features Fahadh Faasil alongside an ensemble cast including Gautham Vasudev Menon, Dileesh Pothan, Nazriya Nazim, Chemban Vinod Jose, Soubin Shahir, Sreenath Bhasi, Vinayakan, Arjun Ashokan and Anoop Janardhanan. The film's plot follows the events in the life of a Kanyakumari-based atheist motivational speaker, who is hired by a fraud agency to work as a Christian pastor. The film deals with themes of substance dependence, religion, and the commercialisation of spirituality.

Trance marked Rasheed's directorial return after a hiatus of nearly eight years since he directed Ustad Hotel (2012). Made on a budget of ₹35 crores, principal photography began in July 2017, and was completed on 1 September 2019. The film was mainly shot across coastal Kanyakumari, and across Mumbai, India, and Dubai. It was the first Malayalam film to use Bolt High-Speed Cinebot cameras and shot with sync sound. Newcomer Jackson Vijayan, composed the film's soundtrack album, with the title song being composed by Vinayakan; the background score was composed by Vijayan along with Sushin Shyam. The film's cinematography was handled by Amal Neerad, with editing done by Praveen Prabhakar.

The film's release was postponed multiple times, with the initial release scheduled for March 2019, owing to production delays, as well as censorship issues. A week before the film's release, it was leaked on the piracy website. Trance was released in Kerala on 20 February 2020, and across India on 28 February.

== Plot ==
Viju Prasad is a small-time motivational speaker living in Kanyakumari with his mentally unstable younger brother, Kunjan. When Kunjan commits suicide, Viju is devastated and relocates to Mumbai. There through a casting director named Kavitha whom he had once met at Kanyakumari, Viju meets a mysterious duo Solomon Davis and Issac Thomas, who hire Viju to pose as a Christian pastor and perform hoax miracles. He is sent to Kochi where he is trained for his role by their associate Avarachan, who changes Viju's name to Joshua Carlton. Initially hesitant, Viju successfully transforms into the character of Joshua. He captures the devotion of many and help Solomon and Issac's enterprise grow into a global phenomenon.

At the height of his fame, Joshua is invited to a TV interview by a reporter named Matthews. On air, Matthews demands a live miracle. Joshua secretly drugs Matthews during a commercial break, causing him to collapse in front of the camera. The event is initially hailed as a miracle but a subsequent blood report proves that he was drugged. Furious at having put their enterprise in trouble and risk of public exposure, Solomon and Issac argue Joshua and asks him to leave. This leads to a scuffle & Viju getting hit by a golf club in the head. Viju is hospitalised with severe head injuries. He remains in coma for two days and they decide to quietly kill him to avoid any further trouble.

On the third day, Joshua starts moving about and shatters the glass by his bedside. He then goes into a psychedelic trance and revives, making a miraculous recovery. He renegotiates his deal with Solomon and Issac to secure 80% of the profits for himself from the upcoming miracle healing festival that's bounds to rake in crores. Suspecting that Joshua is mentally ill, Solomon and Issac agree. They appoint a model and sex worker named Esther Lopez to observe him and determine whether his illness is an act. Esther herself has a past of being cheated in a relationship, giving birth to a child, falling into depression and then coming into the profession. Esther eventually grows close to Joshua and believes that he is really unstable. When she reports this to Solomon and Issac, she is immediately taken away. Avarachan tries to convince Joshua that Esther was a figment of his imagination.

Meanwhile, a poor man named Thomas who is an ardent follower of Joshua, tries to cure his young daughter's fever through his miracle cures. When she ultimately succumbs to her sickness, Joshua is devastated. He comes clean to Thomas and points him to Solomon and Isaac as the masterminds behind the scam. Joshua tries to publicise the truth by sending a confessional tape to Matthews. Matthews plays a dangerous game by asking for money in exchange for his silence and not airing the video but is killed on Solomon's orders . In his dying moments, he manages to call the station to air the video. As it goes public, Avarachan suffers a fatal stroke. Thomas kills Solomon and Isaac to avenge his daughter's death.

Joshua is acquitted from his crimes due to his mental state and spends time at a rehabilitation centre. When he recovers, he learns that Esther is in fact a real person and sets out to Amsterdam to find her. He finds her in one of the glass cubicles in the Red light area in Amsterdam. They see each other, and as she runs to him, the film cuts to black to the sound of shattering glass.

== Cast ==
- Fahadh Faasil as Viju Prasad a.k.a Pastor Joshua Carlton
  - Dilan as Young Viju
- Gautham Vasudev Menon as Solomon Davis
- Dileesh Pothan as Avarachan
- Chemban Vinod Jose as Issac Thomas
- Soubin Shahir as Mathew Varghese
- Sreenath Bhasi as Kunjan, Viju's brother
  - Dian as Young Kunjan
- Nazriya Nazim as Esther Lopez
- Vinayakan as Thommichan
- Arjun Ashokan as Paul
- Jinu Joseph as Dr. Jase John
- Srinda Arhaan as Latha
- Aswathi Menon as Kavitha
- Dharmajan Bolgatty as Soji
- Amalda Liz as Sheeba, Thomas's wife
- Unnimaya Prasad as Shani, News Reporter
- Joju George as News Reader (Cameo appearance)
- Arushi Mudgal as Viju's And Kunjan's mother
- Anu K Aniyan as TV Show Anchor
- Arjun Ratan as TV Show Editor
- Jeevan Stephen as News Reader
- Sal Yusuf as Foreign Pastor

== Production ==
=== Development ===
In a March 2016 interview, Fahadh Faasil revealed that he would be acting in Anwar Rasheed's next directorial and its subject had never been attempted before in Malayalam cinema. Trance was officially announced with a title poster in June 2017. The film was produced by Rasheed himself. The film marks the debut of Vincent Vadakkan as screenwriter. Rasheed was earlier supposed to direct a short story in the anthology 5 Sundarikal (2013) based on a screenplay by Vadakkan but did not end up doing it as he did not get the right cast. Later, Vadakkan narrated the story of Trance, but Rasheed was not ready to produce the film because of its high production cost. Rasheed had Fahadh in mind for the lead role then itself. Fahadh happened to hear the story from Vadakkan and insisted Rasheed to reconsider the project. By then, the storyline had changed, the bankability of Fahadh had also grown and Rasheed was confident in producing the film.

=== Filming ===
Filming began in July 2017. A week-long first schedule of filming was completed in December 2017 in Mumbai. For the first time in Malayalam cinema, Bolt High Speed Cinebot cameras were used to shoot some scenes in the film. The film was shot with sync sound. The film was shot mainly in coastal Kanyakumari, as well as across various locations in India and Dubai. In July 2019, it was reported that Trance was expected to cost close to ₹20 crore post production. Amal Neerad was the cinematographer and Resul Pookutty was the film's sound designer. Filming was completed on 1 September 2019. The film was ultimately made on a budget of ₹35 crore.

== Themes and influences ==
The film deals with the themes of substance dependence, religion, and the commercialization of spirituality. In an interview with The Hindu, Fahadh said the film "is about dependency, be it on drugs, religion or emotions. Religion has become a business these days. [...] What we are trying to say in Trance is that humanity and compassion come above religion."

Vineeth Chacko of The Deccan Herald said the film depicted how "a struggle with depression, unmonitored ingestion of antidepressants and an illusory lifestyle can combine to tear away the seams between dreams and reality ... Viju has bought into his own hype and has come to believe on some level in his incredible miracles." The film studies the intersection between science and faith, dealing "with two kinds of drugs — the psychotropic sort (both legal and illegal) and religion/faith. If the first is being developed by scientists in laboratories, Trance shows us how religion too can be manufactured, not at temples or churches as one might think, but at five-star hotel lobbies (the lobby in the film looks like it's the abode of Gods) with a “we-mean-business” attitude you'd associate with a startup pitch or a job interview." Writing for Silverscreen India, Aswathy Gopalakrishnan said that the film showcased "the green room of the controversial faith-healing business that exploits gullible masses." Critics also noted allusions to godmen such as Osho and Benny Hinn.

Film critic Baradwaj Rangan observed that "Christian symbolism spills over from every frame", citing Joshua Carlton's initials, his third-day "resurrection" and the Holy Trinity of businessmen as examples. Characters in the film also drew parallels to biblical and mythological figures, such as Esther to Mary Magdelene, Solomon to his namesake, Matthews to Icarus, and Thomas to Abraham and later to the Grim Reaper.

== Music ==
Trance

Soundtrack album by Jackson Vijayan
- Released: 15 January 2020
- Recorded: 2019–2020
- Genre: Feature film soundtrack
- Length: 26:14
- Language: Malayalam
- Label: Muzik 247
- Producer: Jackson Vijayan
External audio
- Audio Jukebox on YouTube

The soundtrack album was composed and produced by Rex Vijayan's brother Jackson Vijayan, in his debut as a music composer. Vijayan also contributed to the film score along with Sushin Shyam. The album features a title track composed by Vinayakan TK. The album which was released under the Muzik 247 label on 15 January 2020, features six tracks along with the title track with lyrics written by Vinayak Sasikumar for most of the tracks, with Kamal Karthik and Blaaze providing additional lyrics. Actor Soubin Shahir, made his debut as a playback singer, rendering the track "Mathayichan" along with Sreenath Bhasi and Blaze. The track "Noolupoya" was served as the lead single which released on 3 January 2020. Sneha Khanwalkar, Pradeep Kumar, Varun Sunil, Neha S. Nair, Shakthisree Gopalan, Rex Vijayan amongst others contributed vocals for the soundtrack album.

Trance (Original Motion Picture Soundtrack)
No.	Title	Lyrics	Singer(s)	Length
1.	"Raat"	Kamal Karthik, Vinayak Sasikumar	Sneha Khanwalkar, Neha S. Nair	3:12
2.	"Noolupoya"	Vinayak Sasikumar	Pradeep Kumar, Mohammed Maqbool Mansoor, Varun Sunil, Jackson Vijayan	4:46
3.	"Jaalame"	Vinayak Sasikumar	Rex Vijayan, Lal Krishna, Divya S. Menon, Namitha Raju, Gagul Joseph, Jackson Vijayan	5:49
4.	"Mathayichan"	Vinayak Sasikumar, Blaaze	Soubin Shahir, Blaaze, Sreenath Bhasi, Jackson Vijayan	2:59
5.	"Trance Title Track"	Vinayak Sasikumar	Neha Nair, Lee	4:56
6.	"Vaathil Chaari"	Vinayak Sasikumar	Shakthisree Gopalan, Jackson Vijayan, Tony John	4:33

== Release ==
The film's release was postponed multiple times. It was initially scheduled to be released on 22 March 2019. Then there were plans to release the film during Eid al-Fitr (5 June 2019), but was later shifted to Onam festival (11 September 2019) due to pending visual effects work. It was again scheduled to release on 20 December 2019, coinciding with the Christmas festival, before postponing to February 2020 due to delay in post-production work. Then it was scheduled to 14 February 2020 on Valentine's Day. But the regional Central Board of Film Certification in Thiruvananthapuram referred the film to a revising committee in Mumbai since Rasheed was not willing to cut a 17-minute long sequence that could hurt religious sentiments. On 15 February 2020, the film was leaked on the website Tamil Rockers a week ahead of its release. The film was released in Kerala on 20 February 2020. The film was unable to earn much due to the COVID-19 pandemic and the negative reception from audiences.

The film was made available through Amazon Prime Video on 1 April 2020. The film was dubbed in Telugu with same title and released on Aha.

It was screened at 51st International Film Festival of India in January 2021 in Indian Panorama section.

== Reception ==
Vineeth T. Chacko of Deccan Herald gave 4.5 in a scale of 5, entitled as "A thought-provoking daze" and said: "Trance is another such effort that is courageous, thought-provoking and encourages conversations about issues that matter to us on a personal level and speaks to society as a whole. An avant-garde achievement in filmmaking anchored by a sublime Fahadh". He applauds the film score, lighting and color palette. Goutham V. S. of The Indian Express rated 3.5 in 5 and said: "The abstract style of filmmaking, and the narrative structure that visualises the complex layers of the protagonist's psycho is bound to make Trance a trendsetter in the Malayalam film industry ... Fahadh steals the limelight by portraying a character that is hysteric and disturbing at the same time". He also praised the "vivid visualisation, colour tones and the brilliant use of sounds" and cinematography and background score. Critic from Sify also rated 3.5 in 5, describing the film "bold and thrilling", writing "Trance is a genuine and brave attempt that is gripping from start to finish ... Anwar has packaged the movie deliciously, adding lots of emotions, in an honest way. With top notch visuals, music and sound the viewer is in for a grand experience ... But in a way, this film belongs to Fahadh Faasil, who is absolutely brilliant".

Prem Udayabhanu from Malayala Manorama gave 3.5 in 5, stating that "it is psychedelic and vibrant, flamboyant and gripping ... Trance is magical, hysterical and depressing and you need to transcend the mundane line of cinematic offerings to relish it". He praised the sound design, background score and cinematography. Rating 3.5 out of 5, Sajin Shrijith of The New Indian Express said: "If you are into films with a slightly eccentric touch, you may find yourself overwhelmed by the overall audio-visual experience ... Anwar Rasheed, cinematographer Amal Neerad, editor Praveen Prabhakar, and composers Sushin Shyam-Jackson Vijayan keep us hooked by delivering a film that feels part-dream, part-nightmare. However, post-interval, you begin to sense Trance losing some of the potency established in the first half".

Cris from The News Minute also gave 3.5 out of 5 stars and wrote that "Fahadh delivers a great performance ... Anwar's filmmaking keeps you engaged the entire first half during which a captivating story begins to unfold. The last half does not keep up to the first, scenes that you enjoyed earlier becoming stretched, almost like you took a pill yourself and everything seems to take too long. But it doesn't let you down, with some excellent performances coming from a very promising cast". Sanjith Sidhardhan of The Times of India awarded 3.5 out of 5 stars and stated: "Fahadh as a subdued Viju and the flamboyant Joshua is the maniacal energy that drives the film ... Director Anwar gets the first half absolutely right in its pacing and content. However, the second half of the script, by Vincent Vadakkan, loses steam with the plot then almost reflecting Joshua's mindset in those scenes. The makers seem to have chosen style over substance in the latter half". He praised the cinematography and background score.

Rating 2.5 in 5, Nirmal Jovial from The Week wrote that "Trance is definitely a bold attempt for its theme, as far as Malayalam cinema is concerned. But it fails to do justice to the theme it explores with its weak script that becomes so cluttered and confused towards the third act", but praised the cinematography. S. R. Praveen of The Hindu called it "a half-baked attempt", stating "the first half of the film, which captures this transformation is gripping, owing much to Fahadh's performance, ... The film attains its high by the interval point, almost having the viewer in a trance ... Unfortunately, from there, the script goes downhill. One gets to see the writer taking the easy way out at crucial points, bumping off-key characters in a tame manner and depending on the usual television newsbreaks to untangle tricky situations". Critic Veeyen states that "‘Trance’ does address a theme that is radically important and proffers a compelling investigation into the unexplored realms of religion, faith and belief." But he adds that .."it's also a movie that eventually gets choked by the mistiness that pervades its plot and design, and ends up a pale shadow of the head turner flick that it should have been.
