= Vincy Aloshious =

Indian actress

- Born: Vincy P. A. 12 December 1995 (age 30); Ponnani, Kerala, India
- Education: Asian School of Architecture and Design Innovation Kochi
- Occupation: Actress
- Years active: 2019–present

Vincy Sony Aloshious (born 12 December 1995) is an Indian actress who works in Malayalam films. After appearing in the talent-hunt show Nayika Nayakan (2018), she made her cinematic debut in Vikruthi (2019). For her titular role in Rekha (2023), Vincy won the Kerala State Film Award for Best Actress and Filmfare Award for Best Actress – Malayalam.

== Early life ==
Vincy Aloshious was born as Vincy P. A. on 12 December 1995 in Ponnani in Malappuram of Kerala. Her father Aloshious was a driver. Her mother Sony was a teacher. Her brother, Vipin works abroad. She completed her high school education from Bishop Cotton Convent Girls High school. She pursued a bachelor's degree in architecture from Asian School of Architecture.

== Career ==
Vincy was the runner-up of 2018 talent-hunt show Nayika Nayakan telecasted on Mazhavil Manorama. She appeared in an advertisement as a pregnant lady along with Manju Warrier following the success of the show. She hosted the dance reality show D5 Junior on Mazhavil Manorama in 2019. Her popularity from Nayika Nayakan paved way to her feature film debut in 2019 with a leading role in Vikruthi opposite Suraj Venjaramood and Soubin Shahir. Her portrayal of Zeenath; girlfriend turned wife of Sameer, played by Shahir received positive reviews.

She played Shalini, a receptionist in the 2021 satire film Kanakam Kaamini Kalaham directed by Ratheesh Balakrishnan Poduval. Her performance generally received positive reviews. Though Shruthi Hemachandran of Filmibeat was more critical about her performance and commented: "at some point in time the character portrayed by Vincy Aloshious seemed confused and even lacked depth". Her second release in 2021 was Bheemante Vazhi in which she played Blessy, a pet owner's daughter who is in an affair with Bheeman played by Kunchako Boban. Arun George of Onmanorama called her character a "memorable cameo". She appeared in Karikku mini-series Kalakkachi in the same year. She also played the title character in the 2022 webseries Emily. She played Emily, who becomes a psychopathic killer due to years of clinical depression. Reviewing her performance, The New Indian Express wrote: "Vincy's transformation from a frightened woman who faces her killer to a psychopath who kills her own brother is a testimony to her versatility", while The Times of India thought she "proves her acting mettle".

She played a supporting role of Gouri Lakshmi, a students' leader in Jana Gana Mana. Reviewing her performance for The Week, Ancy K Sunny called her performance "note-worthy" and though it "proves she is here to stay for a long time". The film was a critical and commercial success. She played a civil police officer in Solamante Theneechakal.

== Filmography ==
Key
| † | Denotes films that have not yet been released |

=== Films ===
- All films are in Malayalam language unless otherwise noted.

| Year | Title | Role | Notes | Ref. |
|---|---|---|---|---|
| 2019 | Vikruthi | Zeenath | Debut film | |
| 2021 | Kanakam Kaamini Kalaham | Shalini | | |
| 2021 | Bheemante Vazhi | Blessy | | |
| 2022 | Jana Gana Mana | Gowri Lakshmi | | |
| 2022 | Solamante Theneechakal | CPO Glyna Thomas | | |
| 2022 | 1744 White Alto | Rinnie | | |
| 2022 | Saudi Vellakka | Manju Sudhi | | |
| 2023 | Rekha | Rekha | Won - Kerala State Film Award for Best Actress; Filmfare Award for Best Actress – Malayalam | |
| 2023 | Padmini | Smruthy | | |
| 2023 | The Face of the Faceless | Sr Rani Maria | Trilingual film | |
| 2023 | Pazhanjan Pranayam | Maya | | |
| 2024 | Marivillin Gopurangal | Meenakshi | | |
| 2025 | Soothravakyam | Nimisha | | |
| 2026 | Varavu | Sophie | | |

=== Television ===
| Year | Show | Role | Channel | Notes | Ref. |
|---|---|---|---|---|---|
| 2018 | Nayika Nayakan | Contestant | Mazhavil Manorama | Runner-up | |
| 2019 | D5 Junior | Host | Mazhavil Manorama | | |

==== Special appearances ====
| Year | Show | Role | Channel | Notes | Ref. |
|---|---|---|---|---|---|
| 2018 | Thakarppan Comedy | Guest | Mazhavil Manorama | | |
| 2021 | Onaruchimelam | Guest | Asianet | | |
| 2021 | Comedy Stars Season 3 | Guest | Asianet | | |
| 2022 | Red Carpet | Mentor | Amrita TV | | |
| 2022 | Super Kudumbam | Contestant | Mazhavil Manorama | | |
| 2022 | My G Flowers Oru Kodi | Contestant | Flowers TV | | |

=== Webseries ===
| Year | Series | Role | Platform | Notes | Ref. |
|---|---|---|---|---|---|
| 2021–22 | Kalakkachi | Mini | YouTube | Karikku series | |
| 2022 | Emily | Emily | YouTube | | |

== Awards and nominations ==
| Year | Award | Category | Film | Result | Ref. |
|---|---|---|---|---|---|
| 2022 | Kerala State Film Awards | Best Actress | Rekha | Won | |
| 2024 | Filmfare Awards South | Best Actress – Malayalam | Rekha | Won | |
