= Kerala State Film Award for Best Choreography =

Annual Indian film award

- Awarded for: Best choreographer in Malayalam cinema
- Sponsored by: Kerala State Chalachitra Academy
- Reward: ₹50,000 (US$530)
- First award: 2005
- Final award: 2021
- Most recent winner: Jishnudas & Sumesh Sundar (Bougainvillea)

The Kerala State Film Award for Best Choreography is an award instituted in 2005 that is presented annually at the Kerala State Film Awards of India to the best dance choreographer in Malayalam film industry. The annual awards are managed by the Kerala State Chalachitra Academy, an autonomous non-profit institution functioning under the Department of Cultural Affairs, Government of Kerala. The winner receive a certificate, statuette and a cash prize of ₹50,000.

== Winners ==
No	Year	Artist	Film
1	2005	Brinda	Udayananu Tharam
2	2006	Madhu Gopinath, Vakkom Sajeev	Rathri Mazha
3	2007	Brinda	Vinodayathra
4	2008	Brinda, Vinod KK	Calcutta News
5	2009	Dinesh Kumar	Sagar alias Jacky Reloaded
6	2010	Madhu Gopinath, Vakkom Sajeev	Makaramanju
7	2011	K. Shanti	Vellaripravinte Changathi
8	2012	No Award	
9	2013	Kumar Shanthi	Orissa
10	2014	Sajna Najam	Vikramadithyan
11	2015	Sreejith	Jo and the boy
12	2016	Vineeth	Kambhoji
13	2017	Prasanna Sujit	Hey Jude
14	2018	Prasanna Sujit	Aravindante Athidhikal
15	2019	Brinda; Prasanna Sujit	Marakkar: Arabikadalinte Simham
16	2020	Lalitha Soby; Biju Xavier	Sufiyum Sujatayum
17	2021	Arun Lal	Chavittu
18	2022	Shobi Paul Raj	Thallumaala
19	2023	Jishnu Das M V	Sulaikha Manzil
20	2024	Sumesh Sundar & Jishnu Das M V	Bougainvillea
