= Aravindante Athidhikal =

2018 film by M. Mohanan

- Theatrical release poster
- Directed by: M. Mohanan
- Written by: Rajesh Raghavan
- Produced by: Pradeep Kumar Pathiyara; Noble Babu Thomas
- Starring: Vineeth Sreenivasan; Nikhila Vimal; Sreenivasan
- Cinematography: Swaroop Philip
- Edited by: Ranjan Abraham
- Music by: Shaan Rahman
- Production companies: Pathiyara Entertainments; Big Bang Entertainments
- Distributed by: Kalasangham Films (India); Phars Films (GCC); Omega Movies (United States and Canada)
- Release date: 27 April 2018
- Running time: 115 minutes
- Country: India
- Language: Malayalam
- Box office: est. ₹22 crore

Aravindante Athidhikal (transl. Aravindan's Guests) is a 2018 Indian Malayalam-language comedy-drama film directed by M. Mohanan and produced by Pradeep Kumar Pathiyara and co-produced by Noble Babu Thomas under the studios Pathiyara Entertainments and Big Bang Entertainments, respectively. The film stars Vineeth Sreenivasan, Sreenivasan, Nikhila Vimal, Shanthi Krishna and Urvashi. This film is credited as the 200th film of Sreenivasan.

The film was released on 27 April 2018 and received generally favourable reviews. Asianet Disney Hotstar bought the Satellite rights of this movie for 3.5 crores. The film was a commercial success at box office. The film completed its 100-day run in theatres on 5 August 2018. The film collected almost 22 crores from its overall theatrical run and the producer got a share of 8 crores. The film won the Kerala State Film Award for Best Choreography at the 49th Kerala State Film Awards. Aravindante Athidhikal went on to win four awards at the Kerala Kaumudi Flash Movies Awards 2018, including Most Popular Film, Most Popular Actress for Nikhila Vimal, Most Popular Supporting Actor for Aju Varghese and Second Most Popular Director. Vineeth Sreenivasan and Nikhila Vimal won the Best Star Pair Award at the Vanitha Film Awards 2019.

== Plot ==
The story develops at the premises surrounding the Mookambika Temple. A five-year-old boy Aravindan was abandoned by his mother on Navarathri day in the year 1996 at Mookambika Lakshmi Devi's Sanctum. He is taken care by a kind hotelier, Madhavan. He grows up to be a caretaker of the hotel with interests in arts and social service. However, under his cheerful personality he is keenly longing for his mother and have not viewed the deity once since his mother left him.

2018, Varada, an uptight Bharatanatyam student with her family comes to Mookambika temple to mark her beginning in career as a dancer. Aravindan brings Varada's family at Madhavan's lodge. Varada slips and breaks her leg and is forced to stay and rest at the lodge and thereby she gets to know Aravindan better. He also gets her a chance to choreograph a video album. Varada reveals that it is her passion to study under the famous danseuse Janaki Subramaniam and Aravindan arranges a meeting with Janaki, knowing her personally and also arranges Varada to study under Janaki in Kumbakonam.

Understanding Aravindan's undying hope to see his mother someday, Varada makes it her mission to find Aravindan's mother. As a painter Aravindan has drawn out his early childhood memories and Varada uses it to find clues to the whereabouts of Aravindan's mother. Janaki reveals to Varada that for a new dance show in the United States, the theme would be motherhood, which makes Varada suspicious as her previous themes were based on Faith and Love. Varada finds out from a student that Janaki was married at a very young age and also had a son. She left her husband as he forced her to stop dancing. Whereabouts about her son are unknown.

Varada finds clues from Janaki's past in Udupi, where Aravindan is supposed to hail from. She invites him to reveal this matter and is saddened to find out that he is not Janaki's son, he reveals that Janaki's actual son is in the U.S. and she just does not share her personal life publicly. Varada is still determined and with help from some of her friends and Rasheed, searches the whole of Udupi tracing out the pincodes from the drawings and gets to know from a Government office that his birth was registered, and his mother is Geethalakshmi and father is Dr. Balakrishnan. They then trace out the house that they used to rent and an old postman reveals that Balakrishnan had abandoned them, and Geethalakshmi was a nursing student, who after leaving the place sent the rental dues as money order later on. Varada discovers that Geethalakshmi is married now to another family and is not willing to take back her son, even though she is resentful about leaving him at a Children's home (from where Aravindan strays away in search of his mother) before leaving for home, as she was then a student from a low class family and whose parents refused to accept that she has a child.

Geethalakshmi visits Mookambika with her family in a secret search for Aravindan and making it possible for Aravindan to see the Mookambika Goddess for the first time with his mother while Varada is performing her debutante dance.

== Cast ==
- Vineeth Sreenivasan as Aravindan
  - Jonah Jijo as Young Aravindan
- Sreenivasan as Madhavan
- Aju Varghese as Rasheed
- Nikhila Vimal as Varada
- Urvashi as Girija, Varada's mother
- Prem Kumar as Venu, Girija's younger brother
- K. P. A. C. Lalitha as Kousalyamma
- Sreejaya Nair as Janaki Subramaniam
- Shanthi Krishna as Geethalakshmi, Aravindan's mother
  - Meenu Reshma as Young Geethalakshmi
- Kavya Bellu as Shilpa, Varada's friend
- Vijayaraghavan as "Kaala" Prabhakaran, Varada's father
- Devan as Geethalakshmi's Husband
- Bijukuttan as Sumesh
- Kottayam Nazeer as Sreekrishnan
- Besant Ravi as Swarnalingam
- Baiju as Hari
- Santhosh Keezhattoor as Raghavan
- Sneha Sreekumar as Bindu Hari
- Manoj Namboothiri as Adiga
- Bindu Ramakrishnan as Old lady
- Unniraj Cheruvathur as Astrologer
- Brijila Ragesh as Nikitha

== Production ==
=== Development ===
Writer Rajesh Raghavan first thought about the film after completing his previous venture Vaadhyar. He visualized Aravindan's character and started writing the script for the film. Before writing the script, Rajesh had already decided the cast. With the help of a production controller and a project coordinator he approached director M. Mohanan who found the script interesting and agreed to make it as a film. Rajesh said that this script took him the longest period to write and he enjoyed every bit in writing it.

In October 2017, the film was officially titled Aravindante Athidhikal and M. Mohanan confirmed that Vineeth Sreenivasan will be playing the lead role, after completing Vineeth's ongoing project Aana Alaralodalaral. Vineeth plays Aravindan who is a lodge manager. The film was reported to be produced by Pradeep Kumar under the banner of Pathiyara Entertainment. Mohanan's usual collaborator Ranjan Abraham was confirmed as the film editor. Instead of his regular cinematographer P. Sukumar and music director M. Jayachandran, he chose Swaroop Philip and Shaan Rahman for those positions, respectively. It was Vineeth's suggestion to make Shaan compose the music for the film. Nikhila Vimal of Love 24x7 fame was confirmed to play the lead actress. She plays Varada, one of the guests at the lodge. Vineeth's father Sreenivasan was reportedly part of the cast and was said that the duo won't be paired up as father and son onscreen. Earlier, the two had appeared together in films like Makante Achan, Traffic and Padmasree Bharat Dr. Saroj Kumar. Shanthi Krishna, Aju Varghese and Urvasi were also confirmed to play significant roles. M. Mohanan said to The New Indian Express, "This is an entertainer, which is high on situational humour. One can't call it a family drama, but families are going to love it as it has a feel-good factor."

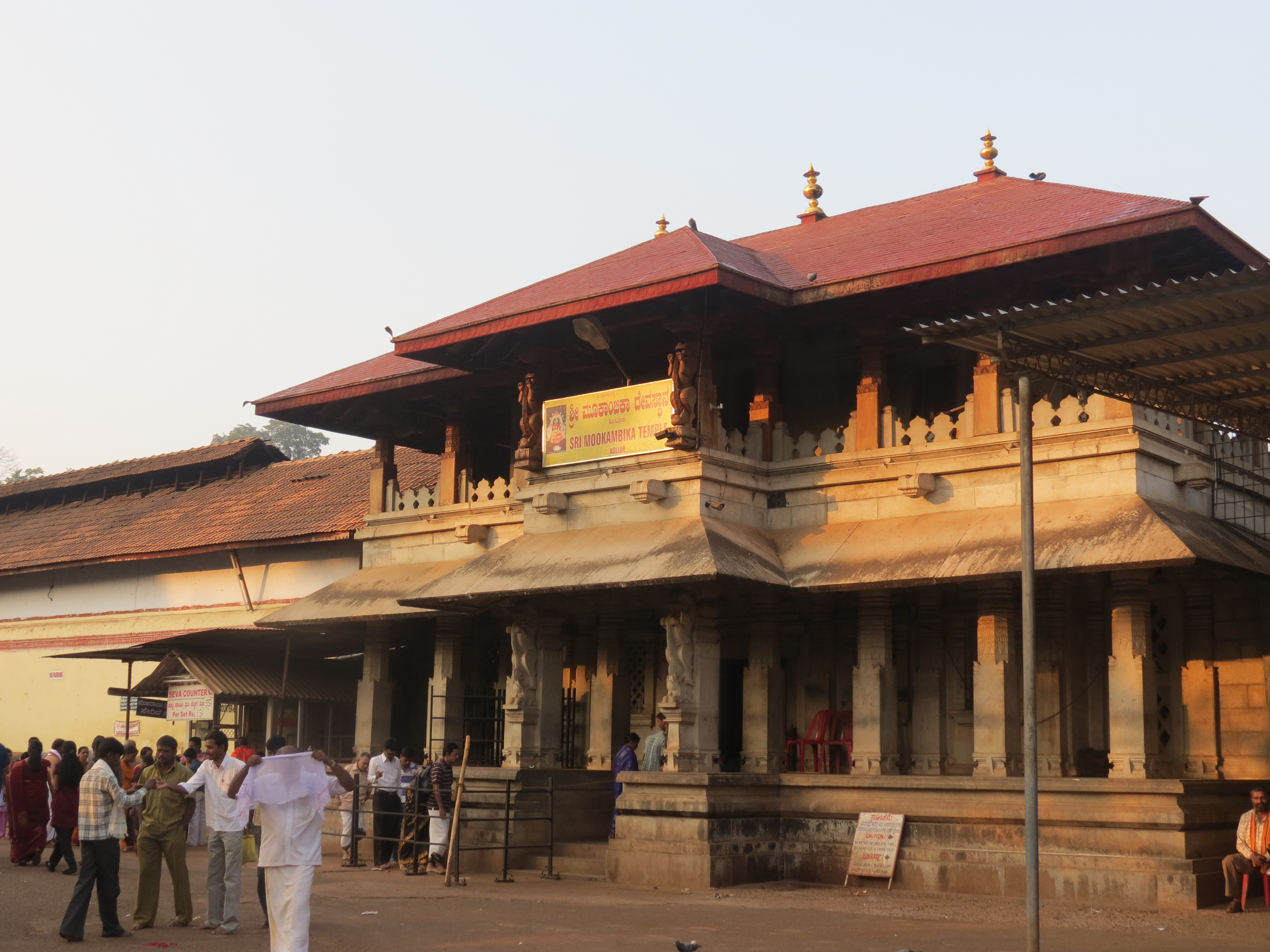
Mookambika Temple, as seen in the film

=== Marketing ===
The first look poster of the film was revealed by Vineeth on 17 February 2018. While sharing the poster on Facebook he wrote, "Here is the first look poster of Aravindante Athidhikal.. A movie after a long time with achan.. I got the opportunity of working with some amazing artists in this film.. Directed by my uncle M Mohanan.. this will be a Shaan Rahman musical". On 31 March 2018, a 45-second teaser was released on YouTube featuring a conversation between the father-son duo (Vineeth and Sreenivasan). The teaser recorded more than 6 lakh views within 48 hours. The Indian Express wrote about the teaser that, "Sreenivasan and Vineeth Sreenivasan's camaraderie leaves us wanting more".

On 13 April 2018, the official trailer of the film was jointly released on Facebook by actors Prithviraj Sukumaran, Nivin Pauly, Tovino Thomas and Anoop Menon. Onlookers Media wrote, "from what we gather from the trailer, Aravindante Athidhikal promises to a clean feel good entertainer aimed at families". In a series of posters, characters of the film were revealed as pairs from 20 April 2018 until 25 April 2018. In May 2018, Vineeth Sreenivasan appeared on the musical reality show Super 4 on Mazhavil Manorama to promote the film, along with Shaan Rahman who was one among the judges on the show. Later, Vineeth Sreenivasan accompanied by the lead actress Nikhila Vimal were seen in the celebrity talk show Badai Bungalow hosted by Ramesh Pisharody on Asianet as part of their film promotions.

== Soundtrack ==
Aravindante Athidhikal

Soundtrack album by Shaan Rahman
- Released: 12 April 2018
- Recorded: 2018
- Studios: ShaanZ Eternal Ray and Freddy’s AVG
- Genre: Feature Film Soundtrack
- Length: 16:50
- Language: Malayalam
- Label: Muzik 247
- Producer: Shaan Rahman
External audio
- Audio Jukebox on YouTube
Shaan Rahman chronology
Aadu 2 (2017)	Aravindante Athidhikal (2018)	Chanakya Thanthram (2018)

Shaan Rahman composed the soundtrack of Aravindante Athidhikal. The soundtrack album consists of five tracks. The lyrics are written by Harinarayanan B. K. and Manu Manjith for the one song "Kripaakari Devi". The soundtrack was released by Muzik 247. Vineeth Sreenivasan had lent his voice for the melody tracks "Kanne Thaai Malare" and "Rasathi". Aravindante Athidhikal's music launch had taken place on 12 April 2018 at the hotel Gokulam Park in Kochi. The first YouTube released song, "Kanne Thaai Malare" was sung by Vineeth Sreenivasan and arranged by the composer Shaan Rahman; other instrumentals include the Indian flute by Josy Alappuzha and the strings by Cochin Strings. The second song "Aanandhame", was sung by Anne Amie (famed by "Kilivaathilin Chaare Nee" song and "Kayalirambilu" song). The film's soundtrack was composed by Shaan Rahman and had been listed at the first position on the iTunes Regional Indian Chart.

Track listing
No.	Title	Lyrics	Singer(s)	Length
1.	"Rasathi"	Harinarayanan B. K.	Vineeth Sreenivasan, Liya Susan Verghese	3:58
2.	"Aanandhame"	Harinarayanan B. K.	Anne Amie	1:42
3.	"Kanne Thaai Malare"	Harinarayanan B. K.	Vineeth Sreenivasan	3:17
4.	"Endhe Kanna"	Harinarayanan B. K.	Megha Josekutty	3:29
5.	"Kripaakari Devi"	Manu Manjith	Mithun Jayaraj	4:24
Total length:				16:50

Critical response

The album received generally positive reviews from critics. Deepa Soman of The Times of India wrote about the tracks mentioning, "Aanandhame" "becomes a soothing semi-classical melody when it gets wonderful accompaniment through the gifted voice of its singer", "Endhe Kanna" has a "mesmerising rendition and the matching orchestra, wrapped deliciously in raag Meghamalhaar, makes it one with a great repeat value, especially in an evening in which it rains", "Kripaakari Devi"'s written by Manu Manjith" mood is vibrant and not just religious, singing is decent, and all elements are opulent enough to give that adrenaline rush while listening to such a number", "Kanne Thaai Malare" is "like a lullaby with a melancholic air to it, which seems to be intended to prepare you for a few scenes to tug at your heart strings", and "Rasathi" "as compared to the rest of the numbers, it comes across as an average fare". Overall she stated, "the composer plays around with many new voices too in the soundtrack, and all of them sound promising as well".

== Release ==
Aravindante Athidhikal was released across theaters in India on 27 April 2018. Despite being released during the exam season and along with couple of other releases, it enjoyed a theatrical run of over 100 days due to positive critical reviews and favorable word of mouth. It was distributed in India by Kalasangham Films. It was released across the Gulf Cooperation Council territories on 24 May 2018 by Phars Films and across the United States and Canada on 25 May 2018 by Omega Movies.

=== Home media ===
The film's digital rights were acquired by Disney+ Hotstar and the satellite rights of the film purchased by Asianet for ₹3 crore (US$320,000). The film was premiered on the Christmas Day of 2018 at 7 pm IST and registered an average TRP rating of 8.62.

== Reception ==
Sify has written that "Aravindante Athidikal is a nice journey that would make the viewer come out of the theatres with a smile", and praised the cinematographer and music director, saying that "the film succeeds in giving an experience of visiting the holy temple and the premises, with its nice visuals" and "one of the highlights of the film is its superb music by Shaan Rahman". Deepa Soman of The Times of India gave the film a rating of three out of five and has written that "Aravindante Adhithikal can impress those looking for a nostalgic, vintage-style movie and those who strongly believe that a story doesn't have to raise further questions". She stated that Vineeth performs "his usual self in the film", Nikhila "gives a good performance, especially in the subtly comical scenes", and praised Urvashi, saying that her "performance gives out such a feel in certain instances". Amrutha Menon of Malayala Manorama rated the movie three and a half out of five, and praised the music stating "Shaan Rahman's mellifluous music that largely breathes life into the plot is also something worth mentioning". She said, "Aravindante Athidhikal is a feel good-movie with good story line and beautiful frames. The film will keep you engrossed as it shares with us a small, yet a beautiful story, captured in an emotional way that touches the viewers".

Anna M. M. Vetticad of Firstpost wrote, "Aravindante Athidhikal’s lack of inventiveness gives it a dated feel that is redeemed somewhat by the music. To be fair, the film is not unpleasant. It is simply plain." K. R. Rejeesh of Nowrunning gave the film a rating of two and a half out of five, saying "Aravindante Athidhikal has a feel good feel throughout and it starts as light and innocuous fun before heading to the sentimental conflict zone".

== Awards ==
Award	Category	Nominee(s)	Result	Ref.
49th Kerala State Film Awards	Kerala State Film Award for Best Choreography	Prasanna Sujit	Won	
21st Asianet Film Awards	Honour Special Jury Award	Urvashi	Won	
21st Asianet Film Awards	Best Lyricist	B.K. Harinarayanan	Won	
Vanitha Film Awards 2019	Best Star Pair	Vineeth Sreenivasan; Nikhila Vimal	Won	
Vanitha Film Awards 2019	Special Performance (Female)	Urvashi	Won	
Kerala Kaumudi Flash Movies Awards 2018	Most Popular Film	Pathiyara Entertainments & Big Bang Entertainments	Won	
Kerala Kaumudi Flash Movies Awards 2018	Most Popular Actress	Nikhila Vimal	Won	
Kerala Kaumudi Flash Movies Awards 2018	Most Popular Supporting Actor	Aju Varghese	Won	
Kerala Kaumudi Flash Movies Awards 2018	Second Most Popular Director	M. Mohanan	Won	
Movie Street Film Awards 2019	Best Female Singer	Anne Amie	Won	
8th SIIMA Awards	Best Comedian	Aju Varghese	Won	
8th SIIMA Awards	Best Music Director	Shaan Rahman	Nominated	
8th SIIMA Awards	Best Actress in a Supporting Role	Urvashi	Nominated	
8th SIIMA Awards	Best Actress	Nikhila Vimal	Nominated	
8th SIIMA Awards	Best Film	Pathiyara Entertainments & Big Bang Entertainments	Nominated	
66th Filmfare Awards South	Best Music Director	Shaan Rahman	Nominated	
66th Filmfare Awards South	Best Playback (Female)	Megha Josekutty	Nominated	
