= Theruvu Nakshatrangal =

- Directed by: Jose Maveily
- Written by: Beema Pally A.M. Ali
- Starring: Tini Tom, Captain Raju, Kaviyoor Ponnamma, K.J.Yesudas
- Music by: Dr. C.V. Ranjith
- Release date: September 28, 2012
- Country: India
- Language: Malayalam

Theruvu Nakshatrangal is a 2012 Malayalam film directed by Jose Maveily and written by Beema Pally A.M. Ali . It stars Tini Tom, Captain Raju, Kaviyoor Ponnamma, Asok Raj and Disney James in major roles.

== Plot ==
Muthukrishan, a street child, escapes from the begging mafia and becomes a district collector.

== Cast ==
- Tini Tom
- Captain Raju
- Kaviyoor Ponnamma
- K. J. Yesudas
- Disney James
