= The Last Supper (2014 film) =

- Directed by: Vinil Vasu
- Written by: Shameer Sainu; Deepak Dharaneendran (dialogues)
- Screenplay by: Shameer Sainu; Deepak Dharaneendran
- Story by: Vinil Vasu
- Produced by: S. George
- Starring: Unni Mukundan; Anu Mohan; Pearle Maaney
- Cinematography: Ajayan Vincent
- Edited by: Shyam Shasidharan
- Music by: Gopi Sundar
- Production company: CYN-CYL Celluloid
- Distributed by: Playhouse Release
- Release date: 9 May 2014
- Country: India
- Language: Malayalam

The Last Supper is a 2014 Indian Malayalam-language adventure thriller film directed by Vinil Vasu starring Unni Mukundan, Anu Mohan, and Pearle Maaney. The film features three characters who journey from Kerala to Tamil Nadu and get trapped in a forest en route.

== Cast ==
- Unni Mukundan as Alby
- Anu Mohan as Imran
- Pearle Maaney as Pearle
- Hariprashanth M G as Anuj Saxena

== Production ==
Unni Mukundan lost 17 kilograms to play the role of a computer hacker. While filming in Nelliampathi, Mukundan fell in a river.

== Soundtrack ==
Music by Gopi Sundar. Pearle Maaney sung the song "Belly".

Track listing
No.	Title	Lyrics	Singer(s)	Length
1.	"Belly Song"	Anu Elizabeth Jose	Pearle Maaney	3:10
2.	"Idiminnal"	B. K. Harinarayanan	Gopi Sundar, Naresh Iyer	2:54
3.	"Bhoothathe Kandittundo"	Gopi Sundar	Gopi Sundar, Gopi Sunder, Abhaya Hiranmayi, Lal, Prakash Alex, Shammi Thilakan, Sruthi Nair	2:25
Total length:				8:29

== Release ==
The film was initially scheduled to release on 2 May, but was postponed to 9 May. The film released alongside God's Own Country and My Dear Mummy.

== Reception ==
A critic from The Times of India rated the film one-and-a-half out of five stars and wrote that "In a badly written, poorly conceived film about three friends going on a trip to a devilish place, interest is confined to visuals, mostly of animals who appear regardless of their unique habitats". A critic from Sify gave the film a verdict of below average and opined that "The film manages to give you some scary moments but that is not all that you want from a movie for sure. This ?supper? leaves you wanting for more!"
