= Yathra Chodikkathe =

Yathra Chodikkathe (The Journey Without Farewell)
- Theatrical release poster
- Directed by: Aneesh Varma
- Written by: Haripad Harilal
- Produced by: Shibu Maveli, Angamoozhy
- Starring: Kalabhavan Mani; Sadiq; Reena Basheer
- Cinematography: Ramachandran
- Music by: Kaithapram Vishwanathan Nambudiri and Ajith Sukumaran Lyrics; Anil Panachooran; Madhu Alappadamba; Subhash Cherthela
- Production company: Rainbow Cinemas
- Distributed by: Angel Release
- Release date: 8 April 2016
- Country: India
- Language: Malayalam

Yathra Chodikkathe (meaning Without Bidding Farewell) is a 2016 Malayalam film directed by Aneesh Varma, starring Kalabhavan Mani and Reena Basheer. This was Kalabhavan Mani's last movie. The film was released posthumously on 8 April 2016 and met with negative reviews. Yathra Chodikkathe had a fifteen day theatrical run. The film was released after Kalabhavan Mani's death.

== Plot ==
The story is about a Kuttanadu girl named Ponnu, who studies in Kochi. She is the daughter of Balan and Indira. Her roommate, Sandra, keeps insisting to meet her Auntie, but she is so focused on studying that she ignores Sandra's request. Balan occasionally came to the city to meet his daughter.

Balan's friend, Maniyappan, offers him a mobile phone as a gift to Ponnu, but she is also given a phone by her Aunty. Ponnu learns about Sanju, Aunty's nephew, who expressed interest in marrying Ponnu. Ponnu then falls for Sanju who has deep affection for Ponnu, which is expressed by his willingness to marry her once her studies are completed.

When Balan comes to the hostel to offer the mobile, Ponnu asks him to stop visiting her so frequently, which hurts Balan. She rejects Balan's phone. Balan returns dejected.

Ponnu is taken to her aunt's house by Sandra, to meet Sanju's father. She is molested there by a person claiming to be Sanju's father. She is forced into prostitution by her Aunty, in order not to lose Sanju. Sanju, however, is unaware of this arrangement.

During one encounter, she is arrested by the police. Maniyappan's friend who is in the police informs him about the incident. Maniyappan takes Balan to the police station to identify Ponnu. Balan takes her home and asks her to discontinue her studies.

Balan plans to marry her to a local man, despite opposition from his wife. Ponnu flees to a hostel. She learns that Sanju is not related to Aunty. Balan goes to the hostel and forcefully brings her home. Ponnu resists, causing a scene.

The police arrive and seek to understand the situation. Sandra claims that Balan repeatedly molested Ponnu at her house, which is why she is unwilling to go with him. They are both taken into police custody.

Newspapers publish Balan's story as narrated by Sandra, and Balan's reputation is badly damaged. Indira leaves to stay with her siblings. After paying his bail, Balan and Maniyappan go to Balan's house. On the way, he is treated badly. He is shocked to see that his wife, Indira, has left him. Unable to bear the humiliation, he hangs himself from a tree.

== Cast ==
- Kalabhavan Mani as Balan
- Sadiq as Maniyappan
- Anil Panachooran as Shivan
- Reena Basheer as Indira
- Suryakanth as Sanju
- Sreekumar
- Manuraj as Murali
- Kannan Pattambi as Chandran
- Jolly Mothedan as Aunty/Usha
- Gopu Kesav
- Surya Kiran as Sandra
- Nisha Sarang as Suma
- Minu Kurian as Ponnu
