= Thattumpurath Achuthan =

- Directed by: Lal Jose
- Screenplay by: M. Sindhuraj
- Produced by: Shebin Backer
- Starring: Kunchacko Boban; Nedumudi Venu; Hareesh Kanaran
- Cinematography: Roby Varghese Raj
- Edited by: Ranjan Abraham
- Music by: Deepankuran Kaithapram
- Production company: Shebin Backer Productions
- Release date: 22 December 2018
- Country: India
- Language: Malayalam

Thattumpurath Achuthan (transl. Achuthan on the loft) is a 2018 Indian Malayalam-language comedy film directed by Lal Jose and scripted by M. Sindhuraj. The film stars Kunchacko Boban in the lead role. It also features debutante Sravana and Thejus Jyothi. Roby Raj was the cinematographer and editing was done by Ranjan Abraham.

== Plot ==
Achuthan lives in a village with his father Gangadharan. He is contented with his life, friends and the simple village life. He works as a cashier at a store and volunteers in the Chellaparambil temple in his spare time. He is persuaded to keep watch while one of his friends Madhu steals money from his own house to set up a business. The robbery goes wrong as the people in the house wake up and his friend vanishes with the money while Achuthen is caught and charged for the robbery. He loses his job and the police keep picking him up for any crime in the village. Meanwhile, while clearing the donation box of the temple, he finds a letter addressed to the deity. The letter is an appeal for help to God from the mother of a girl who is being blackmailed by her ex-boyfriend. He makes his mission to solve the troubles of the girl who put the letter in the donation box. From there on his life starts to change.

== Cast ==
- Kunchacko Boban as Achuthan aka Achu
- Sravana T N as Jayalakshmi aka Jaya
- Kalabhavan Shajohn as Sub Inspector Justin John
- Master Adish Praveen as Kunjoottan
- Hareesh Kanaran as Shoukath
- Biju Sopanam as Shekharan Namboothiri
- Kochu Preman as Kumaranashan
- Anil Murali as Simitheri Babu
- Santhosh Keezhattoor as Santhosh, Shekharan Namboothiri's Relative
- Irshad as Pattaru Joseph
- Johny Antony as Karatte Sukumaran
- Thara Kalyan as Nirmala
- Veena Nair as Sunandha
- Vijayaraghavan as Rajan
- Seema G. Nair as Lathika, Rajan's Wife
- Nedumudi Venu as Gangadharan
- Bindu Panicker as Girija
- Thejus Jyothi as Binoy
- R. Vishva as Madhu
- Ann Saleem as Reshma
- Venkitesh V. P. as Singer in the song "Muthumani Radhe"
- Roshan Ullas as Vijay
- Malavika Krishnadas as Bride
- Siddhi Vinayak as Binoy's Friend
- Meenakshi Raveendran as Wedding Guest
- Amina Nijam as Wedding guest
- Sethu Lekshmi as Ammini
- Subeesh Sudhi as Suniappan
- Sathi Premji as Kunjoottan's Grandmother
- Anjana Appukkuttan as Ambujam
- Shyni T Rajan as Kousalya
- Binu Adimali as Police Constable
- Dinesh Engoor as Auto driver

== Production ==
The movie is bankrolled by Shebin Backer under the banner of shebin backer productions. Filming began in September 2018. The film was mostly set in Taliparamba, Kannur.

== Release ==
The film was released on 22 December 2018.mixed reviews

== Reception ==
The film received mixed reviews from critics. Sify rated the film 3/5 and stated that "The film is a light-hearted entertainer that has its fine moments". Filmibeat gave it a 3/5, stating "It is definitely a simple entertainer that qualifies for a decent watch". Manorama Online stating that "It is definitely a watchable affair with families as it genuinely attempts a neat entertainer".

== Soundtrack ==
Lyrics by Beeyar Prasad and Anil Panachooran.

- "Mangalakaaraka" - Sudeep Kumar, Manjari, Aavani
- "Mazha Varanande" - Anil Panachooran
- "Muth Muth Raadhe" - Vijesh Gopal, Chorus
- "Nenjinullilaake" - Vineeth Sreenivasan, Radhika Narayanan
- "Vidilla Poonda Kallaa" - K. S. Chitra, Sujatha Mohan
