= Junior Genius =

Junior Genius is an edutainment reality television program aired on the Malayalam channel, Amrita TV, every Saturday and Sunday from 8.00 to 9.00 PM. The contestants are aged 12 to 15. The program has received mostly positive reviews, but some negative opinions regarding poor grooming of children and usage of language medium being mostly English also persist.

The producer and director of the show is Mr. Ramesh.

== Judgment and contestants ==
Contestants are from the age group of 12 to 15. All judgment is made on the basis of judges' discretion. SMS voting is not allowed. Arshad Muhammad was the Junior Genius of 2009.

== Trivia ==
According to polls conducted by a local Malayalam magazine, the most popular contestants of the show appear to be Hadi Nishad, Lekshmi SH and Namitha Krishnamurthy.
