= Daffedar =

- Theatrical release poster
- Directed by: Johnson Esthappan
- Written by: Johnson Esthappan
- Produced by: Gickson Thekkumthala; Ginu Mathew George
- Starring: Tini Tom; Malavika Nair; Sudheer Karamana; Chembil Ashokan; Indrans; Kavitha Nair; Jayakrishnan
- Cinematography: Sudheer K. Sudhakaran
- Edited by: Mentos Antony
- Music by: Ilaiyaraaja
- Production company: Eden Films
- Distributed by: Carnival Pictures
- Release date: 21 October 2016
- Country: India
- Language: Malayalam

Daffedar is a 2016 Indian Malayalam-language drama film directed by Johnson Esthappan, starring Tini Tom as Daffadar and Malavika Nair in lead roles. Ilaiyaraaja is the music director and the film's audio was launched by Kerala chief minister Pinarayi Vijayan.

== Plot ==
Daffadar is the story of Ayyappan, a 65 years old honest, sincere, and compassionate security personnel (Daffadar) of the Collector for over 40 years. Evenafter his retirement he dresses as Daffadar and goes to the Collectorate every day.

== Cast ==
- Tini Tom as Ayyapan
- Malavika Nair
- Sudheer Karamana
- Chembil Ashokan
- Indrans
- Devan
- Kavitha Nair
- Jayakrishnan
- Geetha Vijayan
- Neerav Bavlecha unni kannan
- Anjali Aneesh Upasana

== Production ==
The film originally starred Kalabhavan Mani and Ananya, with its pooja function in 2014, but the film was almost dropped after the death of Mani. The filming resumed in 2016 with Tini Tom and Malavika Nair replacing Mani and Ananya respectively.

== Soundtrack ==
The soundtrack album was composed by Ilaiyaraaja, with lyrics written by Rafeeq Ahamed.

No.	Title	Lyrics	Singer(s)	Length
1	"Poothumbakkinallo Ponnonam"	Rafeeq Ahamed	Vijay Yesudas	05:01
2	"Oorila Eerila"	Rafeeq Ahamed	Alka Ajit	04:59
