= Soothravakyam =

Indian Malayalam-language family comedy suspense thriller film

- Theatrical release poster
- Directed by: Eugien Jos Chirammel
- Written by: Rejin S. Babu; Vighnesh Jayakrishnan; M. Gagan Kumar
- Produced by: Srikanth Kandragula ( Shree Tej SK )
- Starring: Shine Tom Chacko; Vincy Aloshious; Deepak Parambol; Srikanth Kandragula (Shree Tej SK )
- Cinematography: Sreeram Chandrasekharan
- Edited by: Nithish KTR
- Music by: Jean P Johnson
- Production company: Cinema Bandi
- Distributed by: Century; PHF; 2G Entertainment
- Release date: 11 July 2025
- Running time: 112 minutes
- Country: India
- Language: Malayalam

Soothravakyam (transl. Aphorism) is a 2025 Indian Malayalam-language family comedy suspense thriller film directed by debutant Eugien Jos Chirammel and written by Rejin S. Babu, M. Gagan Kumar, Vighnesh Jayakrishnan, produced by Srikanth Kandragula under the banner of Cinema Bandi, the film features Shine Tom Chacko, Vincy Aloshious, Deepak Parambol, and Srikanth Kandragula. The film received mixed reviews from critics.

== Plot ==
"Soothravakyam" unfolds in a serene village in the Palakkad district, centring on Circle Inspector Christo Xavier (Shine Tom Chacko), a dedicated police officer with an unconventional side hustle: running free mathematics tuition classes for local 11th-grade students at the police station. This unique initiative brings him into a somewhat competitive yet collegial relationship with Nimisha (Vincy Aloshious), a schoolteacher who finds her own classes losing students to Christo's engaging methods. The narrative takes a darker turn when Arya (Anagha Annet), one of Christo's students, becomes a victim of brutal domestic abuse at the hands of her elder brother, Vivek (Deepak Parambol). This incident propels the film from its gentle, feel-good beginnings into a gripping investigation, delving into themes of societal taboos, patriarchy, and moral policing. The film attempts to blend elements of a cop drama, a mystery thriller, and a social commentary, exploring the quiet intersections of duty, education, and human connection.

Vivek works as Sherly’s driver. Sherly has taken a ₹3 crore loan from Betsy, whose family lives in Canada, and Betsy arrives to demand repayment. During a fierce argument between the two women, Vivek enters the room, assaults Betsy, and unintentionally kills her; Betsy has a pacemaker that becomes dislodged in the struggle. Panic sets in. Sherly uses acetate to burn the body and instructs Vivek to dispose of the remains. He carries the charred remains in bags to an old well on the outskirts of town and dumps them there. A friend of Arya (Vivek's sister), previously hurt by his violence, lays crude bear traps in the area to stop him. Vivek steps on a trap near the well, loses his footing, and falls in to his death. The investigation begins when the pacemaker, which fell out of one of the disposal bags, is scavenged as scrap and ends up in a school project made by a student known to Christo Xavier. The device draws attention and is traced back to Betsy, which leads the inquiry to Sherly. Confronted with the evidence, Sherly confesses to destroying Betsy’s body after the killing, and searchers recover ash and Vivek’s corpse from the well, linking the murder and the cover-up.

== Cast ==
- Shine Tom Chacko as Circle Inspector Christo Xavier
- Vincy Aloshious as Nimisha Ma’am
- Deepak Parambol as Vivek
- Srikanth Kandragula as CPO Jayasurya
- Binoj Villya as SCPO Anwar
- Meenakshi Madhavi as Betsy
- Naseef as Akhil
- Anagha as Arya
- Divya M Nair as Sherly

== Controversies ==
In April 2025, Vincy Aloshious filed a formal complaint against co-star Shine Tom Chacko, alleging misconduct during the shooting of Soothravakyam. She claimed that Chacko behaved inappropriately under the influence of drugs, including making sexually explicit comments and offering unsolicited assistance with her costume. Aloshious also reported witnessing Chacko spitting out a suspicious white powder on set. She initially shared her experiences in an Instagram video before submitting a complaint to the Film Chamber and the film's Internal Complaints Committee (ICC).

Subsequently, Aparna Jones corroborated Aloshious's allegations, describing Chacko's behaviour on set as disturbing and laced with sexual connotations.

Shine Tom Chacko later appeared before the ICC, where he apologised and expressed willingness to accept its decision. Producer Srikanth Kandragula supported the inquiry process and criticized the lack of promotional cooperation from both Chacko and Aloshious.

== Release ==
Soothravakyam was released theatrically in India on 11 July 2025.

=== Streaming rights ===
The streaming rights of this movie were acquired by Lionsgate Play on 21 August 2025, along with Tamil, Kannada and Hindi dubbed versions, making their Malayalam debut. The Telugu dubbed version was also acquired by ETV Win on the same day. On 27 August 2025, Amazon Prime Video also acquires the streaming rights of this movie in all languages.

== Reception ==
=== Critical reception ===
Soothravakyam received mixed reviews from critics.

Anjana George of The Times of India gave Soothravakyam 2.5/5 stars and stated that the direction is "sincere," the screenplay is "uneven," the narrative "occasionally meanders", with transitions that "feel uneven," the plot switches to subplots "without building real momentum, the pacing is inconsistent," and the film's lack of clear genre or focus. She praised Shine's performance and Vincy "brings grace to her character" despite having her character underwritten and the student cast provides "endearing realism." She wrote: "In all, Soothravakyam is a modest yet meaningful film, one that may not tick all the boxes but leaves behind a quiet afterthought."

S.R. Praveen of The Hindu wrote: "Caught between a light-hearted drama and a crime investigation, Soothravakyam does not get the equation right."

Vivek Santhosh of Cinema Express rated the film 1.5/5 stars and wrote: "Shine Tom Chacko lends dignity to an underwritten role in a film that meanders aimlessly without depth or conviction."

Anandu Suresh of The Indian Express rated the film 2/5 stars and wrote: "When Soothravakyam shifts gears into thriller mode, Eugien’s writing does improve but remains middling, relying heavily on the few already-established, overused elements. Opportunities to elevate the narrative are ultimately wasted."

Princy Alexander of Onmanorama wrote: "Overall, the unique storyline and intriguing premise lend Soothravakyam a distinctive charm."
