= Punchirikku Parasparam =

- Online release poster featuring Mohanlal
- Directed by: Hari P. Nair
- Story by: Hari P. Nair
- Produced by: Ramesh Pisharody
- Starring: Mohanlal; Renji Panicker; Pearle Maaney; Dharmajan Bolgatty; Ramesh Pisharody
- Cinematography: Sreejith Vijayan
- Edited by: Lijin Arts Plus
- Music by: Rahul Raj
- Release date: 1 November 2015
- Running time: 2 minutes
- Country: India
- Language: Malayalam

Punchirikku Parasparam (English: Smile With Each Other) is a 2015 Indian Malayalam-language short film directed by Hari P. Nair and produced by Ramesh Pisharody. It stars Mohanlal, Renji Panicker, Pearle Maaney, Dharmajan Bolgatty, and Pisharody. There are no dialogues in the film, instead it features musical score composed by Rahul Raj. The film had an initial release on YouTube on 31 October 2015, and was released in social media on 1 November in the day of Kerala Piravi.

Upon release, film received positive reactions. Within two days, it was watched by more than 500000 viewers after it was uploaded on the Facebook page of Radio Me 100.3 FM

== Plot ==
A young man (Firoz Mohan) enters a movie theater with an ice cream and popcorn in hands. As he get seated, the movie begins showing a man (Renji Panicker) sitting in a chair outside his house and reading a newspaper, while his wife (Asha Aravind) arrives with a cup of tea and gives it to him with a smile, to which she does not get a response.

A women (Jennifer Antony) after putting makeup on her face is leaving her apartment room. At the same instant, another women (Sini Abraham) locks her apartment door and both the strangers walks to an elevator, while a young boy (Bhavi Baskar) also enters inside with them, and he is pasting some paper on the elevator wall.

A girl (Pearle Maaney) is riding a scooter on the road. A man (Dharmajan Bolgatty) in a bicycle selling ice cream gestures her to switch off the head light of the scooter, which she turned off without any response. She stops at the traffic signal where she see a child (Akshara Kishore) sitting on the lap of a lady (Anjali Aneesh Upasana) who is sitting in the backseat of a bike. The child smiles at her, she smile too with an enthusiasm which enlightens and reminds her to return to the ice cream selling man to give back a thankful smile at him.

The paper pasted by the boy on the elevator wall was a poster of the short film Punchirikku Parasparam written with the tagline Be Someone Else's Sunshine. Be The reason Someone Smiles Today. The two ladies after seeing the poster smiles at each other. While the man reading the newspaper after seeing the paper advertisement of the short film smiles back at his wife and with a surprise she smiles at him.

In the theater, after watching the film, the man arrived with the popcorn and icecream looks beside the man (Ramesh Pisharody) sitting next to him and smiles to him which he get a smiles back. While, the movie screen shows actor Mohanlal delivering the message "May smile light up each face and may every moment be filled with happiness. Smile at each other".

== Cast ==
- Renji Panicker
- Pearle Maaney
- Dharmajan Bolgatty
- Ramesh Pisharody
- Akshara Kishor
- Asha Aravind
- Anjali Aneesh Upasana
- Jennifer Antony
- Sini Abraham
- Firoz Mohan
- Bhavi Baskar
- Binisha Balan

=== Cameo appearance ===
- Mohanlal as Himself

== Themes and production ==
Punchirikku Parasparam centers on the message of the importance of wearing a pleasant smile. The short film was actually intended to be a social welfare video reminding people to smile. The musical score composed by Rahul Raj plays the prominent role in the film, which has no dialogue apart from a brief message from Mohanlal at the end of the film. The film was financed by stand-up comedian and actor Ramesh Pisharody. As it was for a social welfare cause, all actors in the film performed without remuneration. According to the makers, the film aims for a social cause rather than earning profit and for spreading the message of friendship in politics, "Punchirikku Parasparam spreads a message of brotherhood and love towards mankind in the upcoming local body elections. The aim of the film is to bring together the candidates contesting the elections," said Pisharody at the press conference held in Eranakulam on 29 October 2015. As a part of this, the four candidates contesting at the Thrippunithura statue ward joined and shook hands as part of it. In the press conference, the release of the short film was announced to be through social media which was scheduled on 1 November on Kerala Piravi day.

The two minute long film was directed by Malayalam Television anchor Hari P. Nair. The subject and concept of the film is credited to the director himself. About the subject, he says, "In our busy lives, we are fine with smiling in selfies or at the mirror but rarely at other people. So I wanted to get that point across". In October 2015, he approached the two leading actors in Malayalam cinema — Mohanlal and Mammootty, requesting to be part of the project. After hearing the idea both of them gave positive response to it. While Mohanlal appeared at the end of the film for a brief literary description, Mammootty officially launched the film online. Other than them, the film featured mainstream film and television actors that includes Renji Panicker, Pearle Maaney, Dharmajan Bolgatty, and Pisharody himself.

== Release and reception ==
Punchirikkoo Parasparam was released on the video sharing website YouTube by actor Mammootty on 31 October 2015. It was viewed by more than 45,000 users within two days of its release on YouTube. The short film released in social media on 1 November 2015 in the day of Kerala Piravi. Within two days, it was watched by more than 500000 viewers after it was uploaded on the Facebook page of Radio Me 100.3 FM.

International Business Times stated that the film received positive reactions from the viewers. Asianet News wrote "You will smile after watching this short film", commenting that the film is beautifully visualized. Malayala Manorama commented that the film ends with a dialogue in "quintessential" Mohanlal style by the actor. Malayala Manorama (Malayalam) said that the film tells everyone to smile at each other and they had succeeded in conveying its message.
