= Unni Lalu =

Indian film actor

Unni Lalu is an Indian film actor, predominantly known for his work in the Malayalam film industry. He is best known for his roles in Freedom Fight and Rekha.

== Early life and career ==
Unni Lalu was born in Kozhikode, Kerala, the son of Balasubramaniam and Sreeja. He began acting in 2017 with the Malayalam film Tharangam.

== Filmography ==
=== As actor ===
Year	Title	Role	Notes
2017	Tharangam	Deepu	
2022	Freedom Fight	Lakshmanan	
2023	Maharani	Shibu	
2023	Rekha	Arjun	
2024	Kattis Gang	Anand	
2024	Gumasthan		
2025	Rekhachithram	Young Vincent	
2025	Officer on Duty	Praveen	
2025	Parannu Parannu Chellan	Jiju	
2025	Innocent	Akbar	
2026	Bhishmar	Sulthan / Aravind	
2026	Unmadham		
