= Swaroop Philip =

Indian cinematographer

- Born: Swaroop Philip; Changanassery, Kerala, India
- Occupation: Cinematographer
- Years active: 2012–present
- Spouse: Divya George
- Children: Hriday Swaroop

Swaroop Philip is an Indian cinematographer best known for his work in Malayalam cinema.

Swaroop made his debut with Orkut Oru Ormakoot (2012). His well-known films include You Too Brutus (film) (2015). Swaroop cracked the camera for the promo music video Sirikkadhey for the Tamil movie Remo (film).his work in the video which stars composer Anirudh Ravichander along with singers Arjun Kanungo & Srinidhi Venkatesh and actors Sivakarthikeyan and Keerthi Suresh. In 2018 he rolled camera for Malayalam movies Aravindante Athidhikal and Premasoothram.

== Career ==
Swaroop was active in the advertisement industry.

== Personal life ==
Swaroop married Divya George on January 7, 2014.

== Filmography ==
=== As Cinematographer ===
Year	Title	Notes
2012	Orkut Oru Ormakoot	
2014	You Too Brutus	
2017	Thrissivaperoor Kliptham	
2018	Aravindante Athidhikal	
2018	Premasoothram	
2021	Kunjeldho	
2022	Ullasam	
2023	Voice Of Sathyanathan	
2026	Spa	
