= Pazhanjan Pranayam =

2023 Indian film by Bineesh Kalarikkal

- Directed by: Bineesh Kalarikkal
- Written by: Kiranlal M
- Produced by: Vaisakh Ravi; Stanley Joshua
- Starring: Rony David Raj; Vincy Aloshious; Azees Nedumangad
- Cinematography: Amosh Puthiyattil
- Edited by: Arun Raghav
- Music by: Satish Raghunathan
- Production company: Ithihasa Movies
- Distributed by: Dream Big Films
- Release date: 24 November 2023
- Running time: 110 minutes
- Country: India
- Language: Malayalam

Pazhanjan Pranayam (transl. Old-fashioned Love) is a 2023 Indian Malayalam-language romantic drama film directed by Bineesh Kalarikkal in his directorial debut. The films stars Rony David Raj, Vincy Aloshious and Azees Nedumangad.

== Synopsis ==
Pazhanchan Pranayam is the love story of Mohan, a teacher who takes a break from his career to take care of his father, who has dementia, and Maya, a caregiver who takes the responsibility of his family.

== Cast ==
- Rony David Raj as Mohan
- Vincy Aloshious as Maya
- Azees Nedumangad as Maniyan
- Pavithran as Father
- Pradeep Kottayam as Sankaran Pilla

== Music ==
The music is composed by Satish Raghunathan.

No.	Title	Lyrics	Singer(s)	Length
1.	"Nalpathu Kazhiye"	B. K. Harinarayanan	Vaikom Vijayalakshmi	03:01
2.	"Snehaardhramaay"	B. K. Harinarayanan	Shahabaz Aman	04:16
3.	"Neeyum Njanum"	B. K. Harinarayanan	Karthika Vaidyanathan	04:27
4.	"Thiri Naalame"	Anwar Ali	Anand Aravindakshan	04:15
5.	"Njaan Aadhyamaay"	B. K. Harinarayanan	Madhu Balakrishnan & K.S. Chithra	04:25
Total length:				20:24

== Release ==
The film was released on 24 November 2023. It was distributed in theatres by Dream Big Films.Saina Play acquired the digital rights and began streaming it on 16 August 2024

== Critical reception ==
Times Now gave 3 out of 5 stars and wrote, "Pazhanjan Pranayam is a promising addition to Malayalam cinema, promising a heartfelt exploration of love and acceptance. The film successfully intrigues audiences with its well-crafted character dynamics, thematic depth, and visually appealing cinematography."
