= Rekha (2023 film) =

2023 Malayalam Film

- Theatrical release poster
- Directed by: Jithin Issac Thomas
- Written by: Jithin Issac Thomas
- Story by: Jithin Issac Thomas.
- Produced by: Kaarthekeyen Santhanam
- Starring: Vincy Aloshious; Unni Lalu
- Cinematography: Abraham Joseph
- Edited by: Rohit V. S. Variyath
- Music by: The Escape Medium; Milan V. S.; Nikhil V.
- Production company: Stone Bench Creations
- Release date: 10 February 2023
- Country: India
- Language: Malayalam

Rekha is a 2023 Indian Malayalam-language thriller drama film. It is written and directed by Jithin Issac Thomas. It features Vincy Aloshious in titular lead role with, Unni Lalu, Premalatha Thayineri, Rajesh Azhikkodan, Prathapan K. S. and Vishnu Govindan in supporting roles. It released on 10 February 2023.Vincy Aloshious won Kerala State Film Award for Best Actress at 54th Kerala State Film Awards

== Plot ==
Rekha, a young woman in a small town, lives with her parents and has finished her sports school and is preparing for her PSC exams. Rekha is dating Arjun, who works at his father's neighborhood shop. On Arjun's birthday, Arjun texts and video calls her, asking her to stay on the call with his intention of self pleasuring. Rekha tries to go outside to take the phone call, not to wake her family, sees her father is sleeping on the patio because of the hot summer. Arjun sneaks into her house and brings her snacks from the shop. He kisses her and they consummate their relationship. Arjun mentions Rekha's dead puppy and mentions how if the dog was alive, they could not have slept together. Rekha asks Arjun if he had caused its death and agrees to poisoning it. Arjun apologies and they sleep together again, but Rekha is weirded out by his confession.

The next morning, Rekha's mother finds Rekha's father dead on the patio. Rekha is suspicious on if Arjun was the cause of this death as well. She tries to get ahold of him after seeing his friends but not him during the funeral, but to no avail. A few days after the death, Rekha finds a cigarette bud in the front yard other than the one Arjun discarded on the night they had slept together. Rekha tries to find his contact from his employer but she learns from him that he is not in town. From his friend, Jayakrishnan, she learns that Arjun left to Kottayam after borrowing 500 Rupees from him. The friend mentions that he left town with help of his uncle, who lives in their town. Unable to sleep from the trauma, she goes to the doctor and tells him about her relationship and that she feels her father died because of her.

Rekha leaves for Ernakulam and she finds Kannan there. Kannan reveals that Arjun's father was also a pervert and inquires if Arjun misbehaved with her. Kannan invites her to his place after his shift in order to meet Arjun. While she visits Kannan, he starts behaving inappropriately with Rekha. She hits Kannan, revealing her wrestling background and breaks his nose. Kannan reveals that Arjun is not his nephew and Arjun asked for his help after his affair with an Anganwadi teacher, Savitha has been caught. Kannan calls over Arjun where Rekha confronts him about going AWOL and her fathers death. Arjun reveals that after he from Rekha's house, her father caught him and he pushed him before leaving. Rekha shares this with her friend and promises that if Arjun is lying about the events, Rekha will make him pay.

Rekha calls her mother to get the number Savitha who informs her Savitha committed suicide after her affair with a guy has been caught red-handed by her husband. Rekha contacts Jayakrishnan to enquire about the identity of the other guy but no one saw his face. She starts following Arjun around creeping him out. Arjun calls Rekha and asks her to meet him. He asks Rekha to stop following him and that he did not kill her father. She asks him about Savitha's death and that police is looking for him. He confesses that he did in fact kill Rekha's father. They get into a brawl where Rekha overthrows Arjun and stabs him with his knife on his private parts. While Arjun bleeds out and Rekha deepens the wound, she asks him if he killed her father before or after sleeping with her. A flashback reveals that Arjun killed Rajendran before he slept with Rekha.

Days later, Police are in search of Arjun because of Saritha and reaches Rekha for questioning. Rekha reveals that she was in a relationship with Arjun but she did not realize how crooked he was. She reveals that she went to Ernakulam in search for him and that they met and she got her closure. Police asks her about her wounds and replies that it happened during house chores. The film ends with Police asking her for her name and her replying Rekha Rajendran

== Cast ==
- Vincy Aloshious as Rekha Rajendran
- Unni Lalu as Arjun (Achu)
- Premalatha Thayineri
- Rajesh Azhikkodan as Rajan
- Prathapan K S as Kannan
- Vishnu Govindan as Dr. Usman
- Premalatha Thayineri as Bindu
- Ashik Zafiya Aboobakkar as Jayakrishnan
- Ranji Kankol as Gopalan
- Irshadali Kamal as Moosa
- Subhash Vanasree

== Production ==
After the collaboration with the film Attention Please (2021) with Stone Bench Creations. Production announced second collaboration with director Jithin Issac Thomas and released the first look of the film on 14 January 2023. Teaser of the film was released on 23 January 2023. Later the trailer was released with the film release date 10 February 2023. The film OTT rights were acquired by Netflix.

== Release ==
The film released in theatres on 10 February 2023. The digital rights of the film is acquired by Netflix and started streaming from 10 March 2023.

== Reception ==
The film received mixed responses upon release. Hindu Tamil Thisai critic wrote that " The screenplay, which keeps the audience engaged long after the film begins, at one point deviates from the direction it is traveling".

Sajin Shrijith of Cinema Express gave 3.5 stars out of 5 and stated that " Rekha is not an easy film to watch. "Appreciated the film. Mathrubhumi critic gave a mixed review about the film. S.R.Praveen from The Hindu wrote that "Rekha works partly as a woman's fightback against an act of injustice but ends up as an unevenly written, half-baked attempt." Shilpa S of OTTplay gave 3 out of 5 rating and noted that "Despite its predictable plot, what makes Rekha stand apart from run of the mill revenge dramas is the way the story is told, through its writing and direction. The well fleshed out characters are enacted brilliantly by Vincy Aloshious and Unni Lalu, who complement each other beautifully and do justice to their roles in every way."

== Awards ==
Year	Award	Category	Artist	Result	Ref.
2023	Kerala State Film Award	Best Actress	Vincy Aloshious	Won	
2024	Filmfare Awards South	Best Actress (Malayalam)	Vincy Aloshious	Won	
