= Neerav Bavlecha =

Indian dancer and choreographer

- Born: Ahmedabad, Gujarat
- Education: BA Economics
- Occupations: Dancer; Choreographer actor
- Years active: 2010–present
- Style: Lyrical contemporary, free style

Neerav Bavlecha is an Indian professional dancer and choreographer. He judged popular Malayalam dance reality series titled D 4 Dance.

== Personal life and career ==
Neerav Bavlecha was born on 16 August in Ahmedabad, Gujarat. His immediate family consists of his parents and his elder sister. He received his schooling from Swami Vivekanand International School, Mumbai. He is graduated in Economics. His forte is lyrical contemporary. His guru in dance is Terence Lewis. He was one of the participants of Dance India Dance Season 3 and were too seen as the team skipper of Neerav Ke Ninjas of DID Li'l Masters Season 2 on Zee TV. In 2010-11, Neerav was seen as the choreo partner of Ragini Khanna who was the contestant of Jhalak Dikhhla Jaa Season 4 on Sony Entertainment Television and bagged the 6th position.

Neerav is essayed the permanent judge of the three seasons of Malayalam dance reality D 4 Dance series. Currently he is judging the fourth season of D 4 Dance series titled as D4 junior vs senior on Mazhavil manorama along with Priya Mani and Mamta Mohandas.

== Choreography ==
Year	Film	Language
2004	Naach	Hindi
2009	What's Your Raashee?	Hindi
2010	Aisha	Hindi
2010	Pankh	Hindi
2011	Love U...Mr. Kalakaar!	Hindi

== Television ==
Year	Show/Film	role	Language	Channel
2012	DID Season 3	Contestant	Hindi	Zee TV
2012	DID Li'l Masters Season 2	team skipper of Neerav Ke Ninjas	Hindi	Zee TV
2012	Jhalak Dikhhla Jaa Season 4	Choreo partner	Hindi	Sony Entertainment Television
2014	D 4 Dance	Judge	Malayalam	Mazhavil Manorama
2014-2015	D2	Judge	Malayalam	Mazhavil Manorama
2016	D3	Judge / captain -Super heroes	Malayalam	Mazhavil Manorama
2016	Onakazhchakal	Guest	Malayalam	Mazhavil Manorama
2016	D 4 dance reloaded	Judge	Malayalam	Mazhavil Manorama
2017	D4 Junior v/s Senior	Judge	Malayalam	Mazhavil Manorama
2017	Hand of God (Short film)	Cameo	Malayalam	Mazhavil Manorama
2019	Comedy Stars season 2	himself	Malayalam	Asianet
2019	D5 Junior	title song dancer	Malayalam	Mazhavil Manorama
2020	Comedy Stars season 2	himself	Malayalam	Asianet

Films

- 2016- Daffadar (film) (Malayalam) - Debut
