= Saniya Iyappan =

Indian actress (born 2002)

- Born: 20 April 2002 (age 24); Kochi, Kerala, India
- Education: Nalanda Public School, Thammanam
- Occupations: Actress; dancer
- Years active: 2014–present

Saniya Iyappan (born 20 April 2002) is an Indian actress who works in Malayalam and Tamil films and television shows. She is best known for her roles in the films Queen (2018) and Lucifer (2019). Saniya is a recipient of a Filmfare Award South and two SIIMA awards.

== Career ==
Saniya started her career in television as a contestant in the dance reality show D2 - D 4 Dance on Mazhavil Manorama. She finished as the second runner-up on the show.

Saniya made her film acting debut with Balyakalasakhi in 2014, portraying the younger version of Isha Talwar's character. She also acted in Apothecary in the same year, as the daughter of Suresh Gopi. After playing brief roles in various films, Saniya played her first lead role in the 2018 film Queen. Her performance earned her several accolades including the Filmfare Award for Best Female Debut - South. She next starred in Prithviraj Sukumaran's directorial debut Lucifer. Then she starred in Mammootty starred film The Priest in a cameo. She next played the lead role in a rape and revenge horror thriller film titled Krishnankutty Pani Thudangi, opposing Vishnu Unnikrishnan, where her performance was critically acclaimed.

== Filmography ==
Key
†	Denotes films that have not yet been released

=== Films ===
Year	Title	Role	Language	Notes
2014	Balyakalasakhi	Suhara (Childhood)	Malayalam	Child artist
2014	Apothecary	Vijay's daughter	Malayalam	Child artist
2017	Vedham	Saniya	Malayalam	
2018	Queen	Chinnu	Malayalam	Filmfare Award for Best Female Debut – South; Vanitha Film Awards - Best Female Debut; SIIMA Award - Best Debut Malayalam
2018	Pretham 2	Niranjana	Malayalam	
2019	Sakalakalashala	Swapna	Malayalam	
2019	Lucifer	Jhanvi	Malayalam	SIIMA Award for Best Supporting Actress - Malayalam
2019	Pathinettam Padi	Sania	Malayalam	Special appearance in the "Party Song"
2021	The Priest	Diya Alatt	Malayalam	
2021	Krishnankutty Pani Thudangi	Beatrice	Malayalam	
2022	Salute	Malavika	Malayalam	
2022	Saturday Night	Vaishanavi	Malayalam	
2023	Irugapatru	Divya	Tamil	
2024	Sorgavaasal	Revathy	Tamil	
2025	L2: Empuraan	Jhanvi	Malayalam	
2026	Varavu	Lisha	Malayalam	
2026	Maddy †	TBA	Tamil	

=== Television ===
Year	TV Series	Role	Language	Notes
2014	Super Dance 6	Contestant	Malayalam	Reality dance show; Winner
2015	D 4 Dance	Contestant	Malayalam	Season 2; 2nd runner-up
2017	D 4 Dance: Reloaded	Contestant	Malayalam	Spin-off of D4 Dance; 5th place
2019	D 4 Dance: D5 Junior	Contestant	Malayalam	1 episode
2021	D5	Contestant	Malayalam	Season finale
2022	Kanalpoovu	Herself	Malayalam	Guest appearance

=== Web series ===
Year	Title	Role	Language	Channel	Notes
2019	Karikku: Thera Para	Ashwathy Achu	Malayalam	Karikku	1 episode;
2021	Instagraamam		Malayalam	Nee stream	
2026	Eyes	Shobitha	Malayalam	SonyLIV	

=== Music videos ===
Year	Music Album	Role	Language	Notes
2014	Va Va Mannikanda	Bhaktha	Malayalam	Music album
2018	Nallonam	Herself	Malayalam	Music album
2026	Kalyani (Remix)	Kalyani	Malayalam/Hindi	Music album

=== Short films ===
Year	Short Films	Role	Language	Notes
2017	Beloved	Paru	Malayalam	Short film
2019	Strings		Malayalam	Short film

== Awards ==
Year	Film	Award	Category	Result
2019	Queen	Filmfare Awards	Best Female Debut	Won
2019	Queen	SIIMA Awards	Best Debut	Won
2019	Queen	Vanitha Film Awards	Best Newcomer Actress	Won
2020	Lucifer	SIIMA	Best Actress in a Supporting Role	Won
