= Tini Tom =

Indian actor (born 1972)

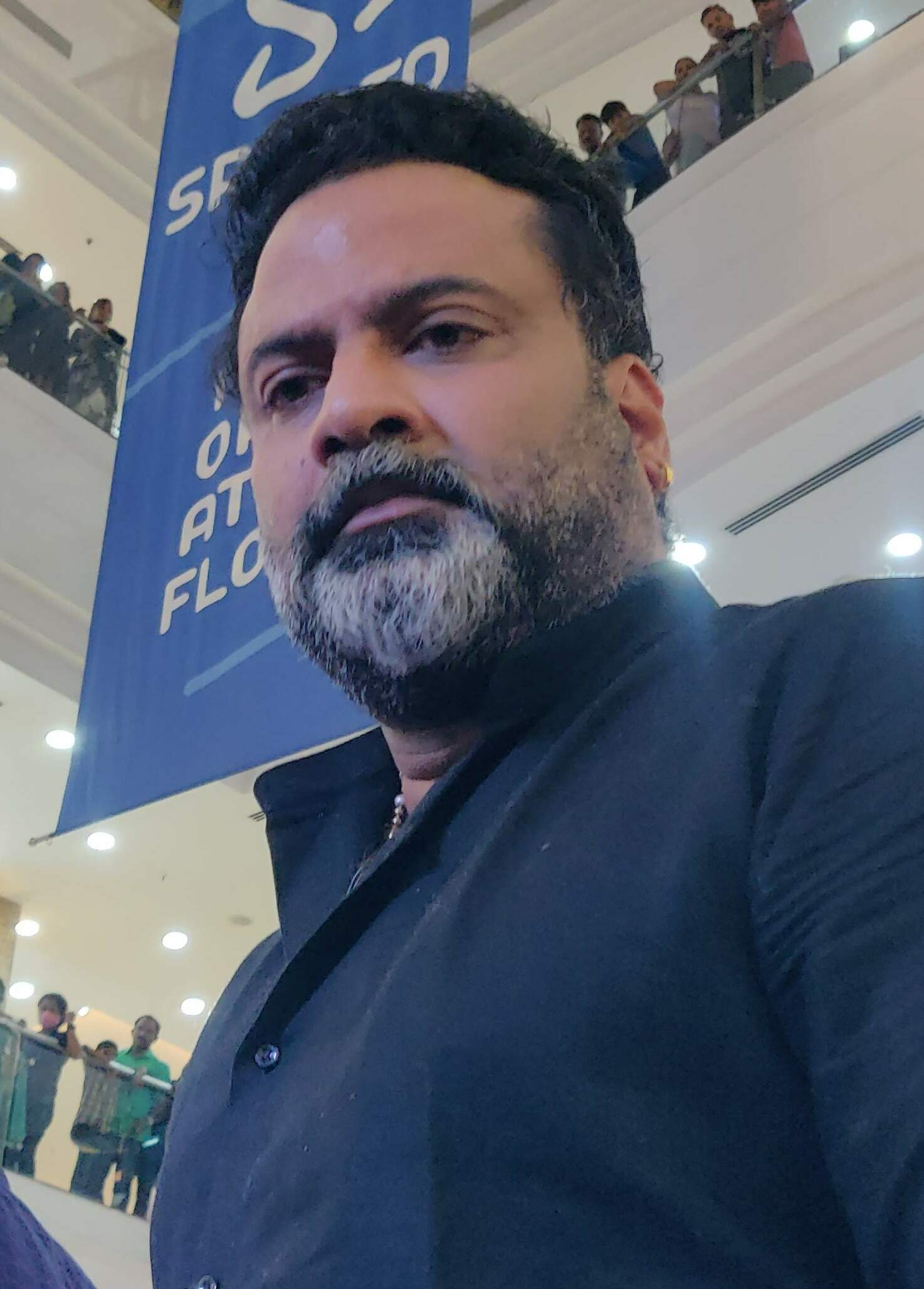
- Born: North Paravur, Kerala, India
- Other names: Tiny Tom, Devassy
- Occupations: Actor; comedian
- Years active: 1995–present
- Spouse: Roopa Sebastian
- Children: 1

Tini Tom is an Indian actor and comedian. He works in Malayalam films and television.

== Early life ==
Tini Tom was born at North Paravur in the Ernakulam district of Kerala. His father Tomy T.D. is an engineer. He has a sister, Tincy. He studied at St. Albert's High School and then at St. Albert's College in Ernakulam before completing his degree in Politics from Maharaja's College, Ernakulam.

== Career ==
Tini Tom started his career as an impressionist and has worked with famous troupes such as Seven Arts, Cochin Guinness and Kalabhavan, which saw him going places. His appearance in a TV comedy programme called Tom & Jerry with Guinness Pakru, became a success. This programme helped both the artists gain entry into commercial films. Tini Tom made his big-screen debut with Panchapandavar (1998) but it was through the Mammootty-starrer Pattalam that he gained some notice. He got his career break with Ranjith's Mammootty-starrer Pranchiyettan & the Saint in which he portrayed the role of a driver. His effective use of Thrissur-slang of Malayalam language earned him high praise.

His roles as the expensive land dealer in Indian Rupee, the noticeable character in Beautiful and the bartender in Spirit gave him a place in the forefront of Malayalam cinema. He is also a permanent judge in Vodafone Comedy Stars, a comedy reality show on Asianet.

He acted as the body double of Mammootty for the dual roles in Annan Thampi and Ee Pattanathil Bhootham and triple-role in Paleri Manikyam: Oru Pathirakolapathakathinte Katha.

He acted in the 2013 Malayalam Film Housefull in a leading role for the first time in his acting career, in which he portrayed the role of a 36-year-old police constable who experienced multiple failures at trying to find a woman to marry and at last after marriage as a result of fertility treatments the couple got four kids in a single delivery. Jyothirmayi was the actress who portrayed the role of Tini Tom's wife.

Two Malayalam films namely Green Apple and Odum Raja Aadum Rani are completed in which he is playing the lead role. Tom's film Daffadar has been completed in 2016. He won the 2017 Critics Award and Abu memorial award for best actor. He was elected A.M.M.A. (Association of Malayalam Movie Artists) executive member. Tini Tom is now in Guinness Book of World Records as host and judge for doing the comedy show Utsavam in Flowers TV continuously twelve hours without break and for the TV live telecast.

== Personal life ==
He is married to Roopa, and they have a son. He resides in Aluva with his family; their house is named Eden.

== Awards ==
- 2014 Asianet Film Awards for Best supporting actor film Vellimoonga.
- 2017 Kerala Film Critics Awards for Best supporting actor film Dafedar.
- 2017 AT Abu Memorial award for Best actor film Dafedar.
- 2022 Kerala vision special jury award for different movies includes (signature, pappan, 19aam nootandu)

== Filmography ==
=== Films ===
Key
†	Denotes films that have not yet been released

- All films are in Malayalam language unless otherwise noted.

Year	Title	Role	Notes
1995	Mimics Action 500	Mimics Stage Presenter	Debut Film
1998	Graama Panchaayathu		
1998	Manthri Maalikayil Manasammatham	Prasad	
1999	Panchapandavar	Divakaran	
2002	Onnaman		
2003	Pattalam	Krishnan Kutty	
2004	Kanninum Kannadikkum	Actor	
2004	Kusruthi	Peethambharan	
2004	Vajram	Doctor	
2007	Hareendran Oru Nishkalankan		
2007	Athisayan	Jamal	
2007	Heart Beats	Police officer	
2008	Ayudham		
2008	One Way Ticket	Chandran	
2009	Vairam: Fight for Justice		
2010	Ringtone		
2010	Pranchiyettan & the Saint	Supran	
2011	Indian Rupee	Hameed a.k.a. CH	
2011	BhakhaJanagalude Sradhakku		
2011	Beautiful	Alex	
2012	Thalsamayam Oru Penkutty		
2012	Shikari	Koya	
2012	Perinoru Makan	Sahadevan	
2012	Hero	Suni	
2012	Veendum Kannur	Sugunan	
2012	Spirit	Johnson	
2012	Naughty Professor	Chacko	
2012	Mullamottum Munthiricharum	Sunny	
2012	Namukku Parkkan	Balan	
2012	Meow Meow Karimpoocha 3D		3D Film
2012	Friday	Jayakrishnan	
2012	Theruvu Nakshatrangal	Muthukrishnan IAS	
2012	Banking Hours 10 to 4	Commando Idikkula Stephen	
2012	Kaashh	Karunan	
2012	Prabhuvinte Makkal		
2012	The Hitlist	Reporter Stephen	
2012	Madirasi	Jayapalan	
2012	Bhoomiyude Avakashikal		
2013	Isaac Newton S/O Philipose	Josekuttan	
2013	Housefull	Ananthan	Lead Role
2013	Kutteem Kolum	Advocate	
2013	Thank You	Sugunan	
2013	5 Sundarikal	Jayesh	In the Segment:"Gowri"'
2013	God for Sale: Daivam Vilppanakku	Kuttichira Achan	
2013	Kadal Kadannoru Mathukkutty	Vidhadharan	
2013	Camel Safari	College Principal	
2013	Pottas Bomb	CI Santhosh Kumar	
2013	Ginger	Circle Inspector Radhakrishnan	
2013	Namboothiri Yuvavu @ 43	Shyam Ambatt	
2013	Ezhu Sundara Rathrikal	Franco	
2014	Salala Mobiles	Venu Maash	
2014	Gunda		
2014	Manglish	Boss	
2014	Vellivelichathil		
2014	Vellimoonga	Jose	
2014	Maramkothi		
2014	Oru Korean Padam	Nandakumar	
2014	Odum Raja Aadum Rani	Venkidi	
2014	Colour Balloon		
2015	6		
2015	She Taxi		
2015	Kumbasaram	Producer Pattabhiraman	
2015	Ayal Njanalla	Chacko	
2015	Mumbai Taxi		
2015	Loham	Jacob alias Thrissurkaran Thendi	
2016	Anyarkku Praveshanamilla		Lead Role
2016	Shajahanum Pareekuttiyum	Tom	
2016	Daffadar	Ayyappan	Lead Role
2017	Theeram		
2017	Puthan Panam	Jayaprakash	
2017	Varnyathil Aashanka	Gireesh	
2017	Pareeth Pandari		
2017	Kaaliyan	Raghavan Ashan	
2018	Diwanjimoola Grand Prix	Subhran	Reprised his own role of Subran from Pranchiyettan & the Saint
2018	Kaly		
2018	Khaleefa		
2018	Kuttanadan Marpappa		
2018	Panchavarnathatha	James Thomas	
2018	Kenalum Kinarum	Police Officer	
2018	Drama	Benny John Chacko	
2018	Kaattu Vithachavar	DIG Jayaram Padikkal	
2019	Irupathiyonnaam Noottaandu	ACP Majeed Ali	
2019	Sakalakalashala	Kolathiparambil Achan	
2019	An International Local Story	Krishnan	
2019	Finals	Thomas	
2020	Big Brother	Khan	
2020	Paapam Cheyyathavar Kalleriyatte	Alex	
2022	Randu		
2022	Paappan	CI Soman Nair	
2022	Pathonpatham Noottandu	Kunju Pillai	
2022	Operation Arapaima		
2023	Antony	Xavier	
2024	Gangs of Sukumara Kurup		
2024	Bad Boyz		
2025	916 Kunjoottan		
2025	Police Day	SP Lalmohan IPS	
2026	Ottam Thullal †	TBA	

=== Television ===
- Cinemala (Asianet)
- Tom and Jerry (Asianet)
- Savari Giri Giri (Surya TV)
- Five Star Thattukada (Asianet)
- comedy stars (Asianet) as Judge
- Sundari niyum Sundaran njnanum (Asianet) as Judge
- Comedy Masters(Amrita TV) as Host
- Comedy Utsavam Season 3(Flowers TV) as Judge
- top singer Season 2(Flowers TV) AS Judge
- John Jaffer Janardhan (Surya TV) as MLA
- Veendum Chila Veetuviseshangal (Asianet) as Host
- Comedy Mamakam (Asianet) as Host
- Comedy Stars (season 3) (Asianet) as Judge
- Top Singer (season 2) (Flowers TV)
