= Taste of Kerala =

- Logo of Taste of Kerala
- Created by: Amrita TV
- Directed by: Divya Kalesh
- Starring: Raj Kalesh; Perale Manney; Reena Basheer
- Opening theme: "Taste of Kerala"
- Country of origin: India
- No. of episodes: 250+

Production
- Running time: approx. 45 minutes / 30 minutes

Original release
- Network: Amrita TV
- Release: 2005 – 2013

Taste of Kerala is a popular cookery show which airs on Amrita TV. It is hosted by Raj Kalesh Later Replaced By Serah and then in late 2011 was replaced by Amrita TV Vanitharathnam Contestant Reena Basheer . The show is primarily based upon Cuisine of Kerala.

It shows the preparation of ancient traditional regional dishes which have been passed over generations. The host visits mainly villages of Kerala to find age old secret recipes. It is mostly shot at Kerala and occasionally Dubai. The show has been on air since 2005 and has completed over 100 episodes.
