= Indulekha (TV series) =

Indian Malayalam TV series

- Indulekha
- Genre: Soap operas; Romance; Drama
- Written by: Biju Vattapara
- Screenplay by: Majeed Sayid
- Story by: Biju Vattapara
- Directed by: Githeesh Karunakaran
- Starring: Malavika Krishnadas; Ameen Madathil
- Voices of: Parvathy P
- Theme music composer: Ajay Kunnel; M. Jayachandran
- Opening theme: പെണ്ണെ നിൻ മാരൻ വന്നേ കല്യാണമല്ലേ
- Composer: Sunaad Shankar
- Country of origin: India
- Original language: Malayalam
- No. of seasons: 1
- No. of episodes: 153

Production
- Executive producer: Santhosh Rodrix
- Producers: Jinu Lona (Episode 1-97); Sibi Chavara (Episode 97-153)
- Production location: Alappuzha
- Cinematography: Raajeev Rajendran
- Editors: Anandhu S.V.; Govind Prem
- Camera setup: Multi-Camera
- Running time: 18-27 minutes
- Production companies: Jinu Lona's Wellborn International (Episode - 1-97); Chavara Films (Episode 97-153)

Original release
- Network: Surya TV
- Release: 5 October 2020 – 7 May 2021

Indulekha is an Indian Malayalam television series directed by Githesh Karunakaran.The show premiered on Surya TV on 5 October 2020. It stars Malavika Krishnadas and Ameen Madathil in lead roles along Balu Menon, Uma Nair, Manoj Nair and Manju Satheesh. All episodes of this show streaming on Sun NXT. The show marked the television debut of Ranji Panicker. Show went off air abruptly on 7 May 2021 due to COVID-19 situation and due to low TRP ratings.

== Synopsis ==
The story is about a girl named Indulekha, who faces the death of her father, loss of their vast wealth and is forced out of their house, along with her mother and sister, all on her wedding day. Follow Indulekha, on her journey of survival as she rises from the ashes, to regain her family's lost glory and reclaim what is rightfully hers.

== Cast ==
=== Main ===
- Malavika Krishnadas as Indulekha Ramanadha Menon (Indu) – Ramanadha Menon's eldest daughter.
- Ameen Madathil as Kalappurakkal Devaprasad (Devan) – Indulekha's fiancée. A young school teacher determined to support his love through thick and thin.

=== Recurring ===
- Uma Nair as Kalappurakkal Gowri Lakshmi (Chechiyamma) – Devan, Shivan and Vishnu's elder sister and motherly figure.
- Balu Menon as Kalappurakkal Mahadevan Thampi (Chettachan) – Gouri's Husband
- Renjith Menon as Kalappurakkal Shivaprasad (Shivan) – Devan's elder brother
- Akarsh Prakash as Kalappurakkal Vishnuprasad (Vishnu) – Devan and Shivan's younger brother
- Della George as Valiya Maliyekkal Mahitha – Urmila's daughter. Was in love with Devan but as he denied her love she is all set to marry Shivan instead to create problems in the Kalappurakkal family.
- Julie Hendry as Karthika – Indu's sister
- Divya Menon / Sumi Santhosh as Kanimangalam Savithri Menon – Indu's mother and Menon's widowed wife.
- Manoj Nair as Valiya Maliyekkal Thrivikraman Unni – Urmila's brother
- Manju Satheesh as Valiya Maliyekkal Urmila – Thrivikraman's sister
- Shari Krishnan as Saira – Shivan's Wife
- Ameya Nair as Lathakumari IPS (Latha)
- Venki as DYSP Pradeep Kumar
- Maneesh Krishna as Valiya Maliyekkal Vijayan Unni– Thrivikraman's son and Karthika's lover.
- Pavithran as Adv. Rajasekharan
- Mani Mayampilli as Thilakan
- Kottayam Pradeep as Madhavan – Urmila's husband
- Krishnathulasi Bayi as Revathi – Thrivikraman's wife

== Adaptations ==
Language	Title	Original release	Network(s)	Last aired	Notes	Ref.
Tamil	Iru Malargal இருமலர்கள்	TBA	Sun TV	Ongoing	Remake	
Sinhala	Indhulekha ඉන්දුලේඛා	TBA	Hiru TV	Ongoing	Remake	

=== Extended cameo ===
- Renji Panicker as Kanimangalam Ramanatha Menon – Indulekha's late father
