= D 4 Dance =

Malayalam dance reality show

- S1 title card
- Also known as: D2, D3, D4, D5
- Genre: Dance Reality
- Created by: Yamuna Yami
- Developed by: Mazhavil Manorama
- Directed by: Yamuna Yami; Vinod (D 5 Junior); Satheesh (D6 Jodi)
- Presented by: Season 1: Jewel Mary [1-86] Sreejith Vijay [1-10] Govind Padmasoorya [11-96] Pearle Maaney [87-96] Season 2: Govind Padmasoorya; Pearle Maaney; Season 3: Adil Ibrahim; Pearle Maaney; Reloaded: Adil Ibrahim; Pearle Maaney; Season 4 Rahul Ravi; Ankith Madhav (replaced); Hakha Jafar (replaced); Alina Padikkal; Season 5: Vincy Aloshious (replaced); Malavika Krishnadas; Arjun
- Judges: Priyamani; Neerav Bavlecha; Prasanna Sujit; Mamta Mohandas; Miya George; Anu Sithara; Paris Laxmi
- Country of origin: India
- Original language: Malayalam
- No. of seasons: 5
- No. of episodes: 489

Production
- Production location: Aroor
- Camera setup: Multi-camera
- Running time: Approx. 52 minutes

Original release
- Network: Mazhavil Manorama
- Release: 6 April 2014 – 10 November 2019

D 4 Dance is an Indian dance reality series which premiered on Mazhavil Manorama and has completed five seasons.

== Cast ==
=== Judges ===
Judges	Seasons					
Judges	1	2	3	Reloaded	4	5
Neerav Bavlecha	Main	Main	Main	Main	Main	
Priyamani	Main	Main	Main		Main	
Prasanna Sujit	Main	Main	Main		Guest	Main
Mamta Mohandas				Main	Guest	
Anu Sithara					Guest	
Miya George						Main
Paris Laxmi						Main

=== Hosts ===
Hosts	Seasons					
Hosts	1	2	3	Reloaded	4	5
Pearle Maaney	Main					
Govind Padmasoorya	Main					
Sreejith Vijay	Replaced by Govind Padmasoorya					
Jewel Mary	Replaced by Pearle Maaney					
Adil Ibrahim			Main			
Rahul Ravi					Main	
Alina Padikkal					Main	
Ankith Madhav					Replaced	
Hakha Jafar					Replaced	
Malavika Krishnadas						Main
Arjun						Main
Vincy Aloshious						Replaced

== Series & Awards ==
Season	Host	Judges	Launch	Finale	Sponsored by	Winner	Runner up	Second Runner Up
1	Jewel Mary; Replaced By Pearle Maaney — Sreejith Vijay; Replaced By Govind Padmasoorya	Priyamani; Neerav Bavlecha; Prasanna Sujit	11 April 2014	24 November 2014	Idea Cellular	Ramzan Muhammed	Aashiq Nawal	Swathi Sreeram
2	Pearle Maaney — Govind Padmasoorya	Priyamani; Neerav Bavlecha; Prasanna Sujit	5 December 2014	13 September 2015	Gum On	Pranav Sasidharan	Fida Ashraf	Saniya Iyappan
3	Pearle Maaney — Adil Ibrahim	Priyamani; Neerav Bavlecha; Prasanna Sujit	28 March 2016	19 November 2016	Eastern	Solo; Nasif Appu; Duet; Ann Mary & Vineesh; Group; Team Aliyans	Solo; Anna Prasad; Duet; Juhi & Bhavik; Group; RC Boys	Solo; Nakul Thampi; Duet; Akhil & Ashwin; Group; Maramkothees
D4 Dance Reloaded	Pearle Maaney — Adil Ibrahim	Neerav Bavlecha; Mamta Mohandas	21 November 2016	21 December 2016	Kajaria Tiles	Dilsha Prasanann, Rinosh Surendran	Jerry, Vyshakh	Vishnu, Anna
4	Ankith Madhav replaced by Hakha Jafar replaced by Alina Padikkal — Rahul Ravi	Priyamani; Neerav Bavlecha —Mamta Mohandas replaced by Anu Sithara replaced by Prasanna Sujit	1 May 2017	3 December 2017	Eastern	Soorya Sreejith	Vaiga Sinov	
5	Vincy Aloshious; Replaced by Malavika Krishnadas: RJ Arjun Gopal	Prasanna Sujit; Miya George; Paris Laxmi	6 April 2019	3 September 2019	Eastern	Chaidhik	Anamika	Lakshmi Shaji

Male
Female
Awards
- Asiavision awards 2016 for Best Anchor- Govind Padmasoorya

- Kerala state television awards :

- popular TV show - D3
- Best Anchor - Govind Padmasoorya

== Season 1 ==
The first season was titled as D 4 Dance. The show was first aired on 11 April 2014, and its last episode aired on 24 November 2014. It was hosted by Jewel Mary and Sreejith Vijay who was later replaced by Govind Padmasoorya and Pearly Maaney (as Jewel went away for movie shots, she rejoined towards the finale)). There were total of 18 contestants in which Ramzan Muhammed was declared as the winner of the show bagging 50 lakhs Indian Rupees. followed by Aashiq Nawal (2nd place), Swathi Sreeram (3rd place), Ajas N. (4th place), and Dilsha Prasanann (5th place).

== Season 2 ==
The second season of the series was titled as D2 - D 4 Dance. The very first episode on-air was on 5 December 2014 and its final episode was telecasted on 13 September 2015 declaring Pranav Sasidharan as the winner of the season winning 5 Million Indian Rupees followed by Fida Ashraf (2nd place), Saniya Iyappan (3rd place), Suhaid Kukku (4th place), and Arjun Krishna (5th place). The show was hosted by Govind Padmasoorya and Pearle Maaney . Chemistry between Govind Padmasoorya and Pearle Maaney made the show more entertaining. They introduced different kinds of hosting styles to the Indian television. Their chemistry was one of the biggest reason for the high trp rating D2 received. Finale of D2 broke all the rating records of Malayalam television shows from 2014 to 2013. This was the first time a non Asianet show broke the rating records among Malayalam channels. In 2016, 18th Asianet film Award broke the record of D2 Grand finale after one year with various point difference . It was the best season among all D4 dance seasons.

== Season 3 ==
The third season of the series is titled as D3 - D 4 Dance and is hosted by Pearle Maaney and actor Adil Ibrahim. The show was aired on 28 March 2016. The winner of the third season will be awarded 7.5 Million Indian Rupees as Rs.2.5 million to the each winner of Solo, Duet & Group performers.

The show is directed by Yamuna. The contestants are selected by the auditions in Group, Solo and Duet performance. The show is judged by Priyamani, Neerav Bavlecha and Prasanna Sujit and the series consist of three mentors/vice captains who are all finalists of the previous seasons, Ramzan Muhammed, Pranav Sasidharan and Suhaid Kukku. These judges along with the vice captains are individually leading three teams, Master Rockers - Prasanna Sujit & Suhaid Kukku, Star Challengers - Priyamani & Pranav Sasidharan, Super Heroes - Neerav Bavlecha & Ramzan Muhammed. By the end of each episode, an achievement is given to the contestants as per the categories: Eastern Spicy Performance of The Day, Kalyan Silks Star Dancer of The Day, and Step of the Day

The show claims to be India's first ever dance Reality television series to give a stage for the Transgender people of India.

A few contestants for the solo and duet category were taken into D3 through a wild card entry. The main reason for this was due to the lack of solo contestants after 4th innings.

The first prize for the Solo was won by Nasif Appu with a cash prize of 2.5 million rupees, followed by Anna Prasad. The first prize for the Duet category was won by Ann Mary and Vineesh also having the cash followed by Juhi and Bhavik. The first place for the Group category was won by Aliyans. The second prize was for RC Boys.

=== Solo ===
- Nasif Appu (1st)
- Anna Prasad (2nd)
- Nakul Thampi (3rd)
- Remya (4th)

=== Duet ===
- Ann Mary and Vineesh (1st)
- Juhi and Bhavik (2nd)
- Akhil and Ashwin (3rd)
- Raees and Roshan (4th)

=== Group ===
- Aliyans (1st)
- RC Boys (2nd)
- Maramkothees (3rd)
- DR Crew (4th)

=== Cast ===
Vice Captains

- Suhaid Kukku
- Ramzan Muhammed
- Pranav Sasidharan

Season 3 Guest Appearance

- Abhirami Suresh
- Amrutha Suresh
- Arthana Binu
- M G Rajamanickam IAS
- Manu Nair
- Master Chethan
- Nishanthini IPS
- Raj Zachariah
- Sabareesh Prabhakar
- Sruthi Menon
- Sujith Vaassudev
- Sumesh Anand
- Sumesh krishnan
- Vinay Fort
- Avanthika Mohan
- Deepu Karunakaran
- Jayaram
- Kunchacko Boban
- Malavika Wales
- Manju Pillai
- Manju Warrier
- Neha Saxena
- Ramesh Pisharody
- S. Sreesanth
- Shane Nigam
- Shobana
- Suresh Gopi
- Tovino Thomas
- Unni Mukundan
- Vedhika
- Vijay Babu

=== Innings ===
1st innings

- Dhamaka Group of series - Aliyans
- Jodi No 1 - Raees and Roshan
- Super Solo - Abhishek Anand

2nd innings

- Dhamaka Group of series - RC Boys
- Jodi No 1 - Raees and Roshan
- Super Solo - Nakul Thampi

3rd innings

- Dhamaka Group of series - RC Boys
- Jodi No 1 - Raees and Roshan
- Super Solo - Nasif Appu

4th innings

- Dhamaka Group of series - Maramkkothees
- Jodi No 1 - Ann- Mary and Vineesh
- Super Solo - Nasif Appu

5th innings

- Dhamaka Group of series - DR crew
- Jodi No 1 - Ann Mary and Vineesh
- Super Solo - Nasif Appu

6th innings

- Dhamaka Group of series - Aliyans
- Jodi No 1 - Juhi & Bhavik / Raees & Roshan
- Super Solo - Nasif and Nakul

7th innings

- Dhamaka Group of series - Aliyans
- Jodi No 1 - Ann Mary and Vineesh
- Super Solo - Nasif Appu

Semi-finals

- Dhamaka Group of series - RC boys
- Jodi No 1 -Juhi and Bhavik
- Super Solo - Nasif Appu

D3 Season entry to final

- Dhamaka Group of season - DR crew
- Jodi No 1 - Ann Mary and Vineesh
- Super Solo - Anna Prasad

== D4 Dance Reloaded ==
Titled as D4 Dance Reloaded, is a show consisting of only 15 episodes. Judged by Neerav Bavlecha and Mamta Mohandas and hosted by Pearle Maaney and Adil Ibrahim. This is the fourth instalment in the D4 dance series and the show was aired on 21 November 2016. The super finale of the show was telecast on 20 and 21 December.

This will be the shortest reality show in Malayalam Television which will get over in 15 episodes. Popular contestants of all the 3 seasons of the show will team up as a pair and compete for the title.10 pairs are competing in the show (total 20 contestants) and will be performing for 6 stages and the pair with the highest score at the end of 6 performances will win the title in the Grand Finale which will happen in late 2016. All 10 pairs are trained by 10 different choreographer's who had taken part in earlier seasons.

Malayalam film actress and playback singer Mamta Mohandas and Neerav Bavlecha will judge the show. The show is sponsored by Kajaria Tiles and co-sponsored by Q7 Thinner, Sleepwell My Mattress and Bharthi TMT.

Title winners Dilsha Prasanann and Rinosh Surendren (Choreographer Dileep Kumar) were awarded 1 million rupees by F2 Fashion to You casuals.

=== Guest appearance ===
- Bhavana
- Lakshmi Gopalaswamy
- Rahman
- Vineeth

=== Participants ===
- Ajith and Swathi
- Arjun and Sanjal
- Bhavik and Shamaz
- Dilsha and Rinosh
- Jerry and Vysakh
- Nakul Thampi and Saniya Iyappan
- Renjini and Sneha
- Rishi and Aradhya
- Shameer and Rakhu
- Sushmita and Dihin
- Vishnu and Anna

=== Finalists ===
- Rinosh and Dilsha (1st)
- Jerry and Vyshakh (2nd)
- Vishnu and Anna (3rd)
- Bhavik and Shamaz (4th)
- Nakul and Saniya (5th)

== Season 4 ==
The official fourth season of the series is titled as D4 - D 4 Dance Junior v/s Senior and is hosted by anchor turned actress Alina Padikkal and television actor Rahul Ravi. The show started airing on 1 May 2017. Ankith Madhav initially hosted the show With Rahul, from episode 11, Hakha Jafar had replaced Ankit Madhav and later in episode 36, Alina replaced Hakka. The winner of the season will be awarded 25 Lakh Rupees and the second prize winner will get Rs.10 Lakh. Later, Prasanna Master joined the jury replacing Mamta Mohandas and Anu Sithara. The final was held on 3 December 2017. The juniors won the series with Saniya receiving the fourth place with a cash prize of 1 lakh from Kajaria tiles, Sajin in third with 5 lakhs from I & u icecreams, second place was for Vaigha bagging 10 lakhs from Q7 thinner and the Winner- Surya with 25 lakhs from Bismi.

=== Top 4 ===
- Suriya
- Vaigha
- Sajin
- Saniya

== Season 5 ==
The official fifth season of D 4 Dance is launching on the channel from 6 April 2019 on every Saturday-Sunday at 8:00 PM. The show was hosted by RJ Arjun and Vincy Aloshious later replaced by Malavika Krishnadas

Judges

- Prasanna Sujit
- Miya George
- Paris Laxmi

Winners

- Winner: Chaithik
- First runner-up: Anamika
- Second runner-up: Lakshmi Shaji
