= Karikku =

Indian digital platform

- Karikku Logo used since August 2020

Instagram information
- Page: karikku_fresh
- Followers: 2.4 Million

YouTube information
- Years active: 2018 – present
- Genres: Comedy; Drama; Thriller
- Subscribers: 9.99 Million
- Views: 2.16 Billion
- Last updated: September 2026

Karikku (transl. Tender Coconut) is an Indian YouTube channel in Malayalam, founded by Nikhil Prasad in 2018. The YouTube Channel gained popularity with their first Web series titled "Thera Para". Karikku has different business verticals including Fliq (multi genre web series space), Tuned (indie music label), Fuse (advertising and influencer marketing), Wybe (merchandising) and Zero (news aggregator).

The channel received the Golden Creator Award upon reaching one million subscribers on YouTube in 2019.

The Karikku YouTube Channel received the Mazhavil Entertainment award 2019 for the Best Original Content (Digital) presented by Mazhavil Manorama.

== History ==
The YouTube channel Karikku was launched on 16 August 2016 by Nikhil Prasad. Karikku uploaded its first video on April's Fools Day in 2018.

The channel's breakthrough came with the series Thera Para, which discusses the life of four young men in a very relatable manner, touching upon the day in the life of people around that age category. The video was later converted to a single watch of Season 1 with some minor edits and re-released in 2020. A movie with the same name was announced through their YouTube channel as a motion poster but was cancelled due to pandemic.

Its popularity grew rapidly throughout 2019, with the addition of new cast and crew members and interesting plots. Film actors like Tovino Thomas (Gym Boys), Aju Varghese (Thera Para Season), Rajisha Vijayan (Valentine's Day Gift) and Saniya Iyyappan (Thera Para) made cameo appearances.

They released a video in 2019 celebrating their new YouTube Silver Play Button, after crossing 100,000 subscribers, promoting more viewers to subscribe, as they aimed for the Golden Play Button.

In 2020, after a small break due to the COVID-19 crisis and the resulting lockdown, Karikku gradually started to upload videos, beginning with an episode based on a video call, creating a spin-off of the episode Bhaskaran Pillai technologies .

In collaboration with Netflix, karikku released a video titled Ripper - the wanted Killer on 3 April 2021. The Sketch is a promotion for the Malayalam motion picture Irul and was released on the official Netflix India YouTube channel.

Karikku announced their first feature film in October 2025 and expected to be released by following year.

== Mini series ==
Year	Series	Director	Episodes	YouTube Channel	First Aired	Last Aired	Ref.
2018 - 2019	Thera Para	Nikhil Prasad	20	Karikku	21 July	23 March	
2019	Rock Paper Scissors Season 1	Adithyan Chandrashekar	8	Karikku fliq	5 October	30 November	
2019 - 2020	Plus Two Class	Nikhil Prasad	6	Karikku	7 December	7 April	
2020 - 2021	Scoot	Arjun Ratan	8	Karikku fliq	15 February	17 January	
2020	Doosra	Nikhil Prasad	3	Karikku	22 June	11 July	
2020	DJ	Krishna Chandran	2	Karikku	30 November	24 December	
2020 - 2021	Rock Paper Scissors Season 2	Shyamin Gireesh	6	Karikku fliq	25 December	21 March	
2021	Insomnia Nights	Thamby	5	Karikku fliq	10 June	3 July	
2021	Average Ambili	Adithyan Chandrashekar	6	Karikku fliq	19 July	12 September	
2021	Better Half	Krishna Das Murali	6	Karikku fliq	21 August	4 October	
2021 - 2022	Kalakkachi	Arjun Ratan	2	Karikku	25 December	1 January	
2022	Sebastiante Velliyazhcha	Sidharth K T	5	Karikku fliq	21 May	24 June	
2022	Circus	Binoy John	2	Karikku	25 June 25	12 July	
2022	Bharati Apartments	Krishna Chandran	3	Karikku	29 August	15 October	
2022	Jabla	Basil Gershome	5	Karikku fliq	15 October	23 October	
2022	Samarthya Shastram	Shyamin Gireesh	6	Karikku	16 November	10 December	
2023	Thenks!	Binoy John	2	Karikku	21 May	30 May	
2023	Priyapettavan Piyush	Goutham Soorya	6	Karikku	30 June	16 July	
2024	Mokka	Nikhil Prasad	2	Karikku	8 March	20 March	
2024	Porul	Goutham Soorya	5	Karikku	10 May	18 May	
2024	JAM	Binoy John	3	Karikku	14 September	25 September	
2025	Something Fishy	Abijith Krishnan	2	Karikku	27 April	30 May	

== Thera Para ==
Thera Para Poster

Thera Para is a 2018 Malayalam mini web series created by Nikhil Prasad for Karikku. The web series revolves around the lives of four energetic young men and their struggles to become successful. The main four characters - George, Lolan, Shibu and Shambu are roommates. Three of them are unemployed and B.Tech graduates. Shibu is the only one who is employed in the group. The series lasted for 20 episodes. The first episode titled Ithaanu Avastha (Transl. This is the situation) was released on 21 July 2018 and the last episode - Ivide theerunilla (Transl. It doesn't end here) on 23 March 2019. After the season finale, on 7 July 2019, the Karikku team announced their decision to produce a movie - Thera Para - The Movie by sharing a motion poster on YouTube.

The story revolves around four friends. George is an unemployed BTech graduate. Lolan is having an affair with Ashwathy Achu online. Shambu is a tech genius. Shibu, 12th pass-out but the only employed one and takes care of the other three. They face many problems but still find a way to get rid of it.

Guest appearances included:

- Aju Varghese as Adv. Prahlad Iyyer
- Saniya Iyappan as Aswathy "Achu"

== YouTube Sketches ==
Year	Title	Director	Story	Released	Notes
2018	April Fools Special	Nikhil Prasad	Binoy John	1 April	
2018	Types of Malayali Teachers	Nikhil Prasad	Binoy John	10 April	
2018	Trip Planning - ഒരു മഹാസംഭവം	Nikhil Prasad	Anu K. Aniyan	24 April	
2018	Oru Gorilla Interview	Nikhil Prasad	Anu K. Aniyan	18 May	
2018	Mobile Mania Symptoms	Nikhil Prasad	Binoy John	1 June	
2018	Kannan Chaala from Kulu Manali	Nikhil Prasad	Anu K. Aniyan	5 June	
2018	FIFA World Cup 2018	Karikku Team		18 June	FIFA Fan based videos
2018	FIFA vs TV Series	Karikku Team		29 June	FIFA Fan based videos
2018	FIFA Fans TV Interview	Karikku Team		8 July	FIFA Fan based videos
2018	FIFA First Night	Karikku Team		9 July	FIFA Fan based videos
2018	FIFA Finale	Karikku Team		17 July	FIFA Fan based videos
2018	Types of Piruvukar	Karikku Team		8 September	
2018	What’s wrong with a Beard and Mustache?	Karikku Team		29 September	
2018	That Chooriyan Friend	Karikku Team		12 October	
2018	Oru 99 Reunion	Nikhil Prasad	Arjun Ratan	18 October	96 Spoof
2018	Beef Roast	Karikku Team		1 November	
2018	That Psycho Friend	Karikku Team		5 November	extended version
2018	Kuttikalikal	Karikku Team		13 November	
2018	Girls bad boys ആയൽ	Karikku Team		30 November	
2018	That OSS Friend	Karikku Team		14 December	
2018	Veruppikkal Appappans	Nikhil Prasad		24 December	
2019	Ippo Sheriyakkitharam	Karikku Team		14 January	
2019	Mr. Pishuku Kumar	Nikhil Prasad		28 January	
2019	Valentine's Gift	Nikhil Prasad		14 February	features Rajisha Vijayan
2019	Plus Two Free Period	Nikhil Prasad		14 April	
2019	Bada Chotta	Jeevan Stephen	Karikku Team	4 May	
2019	PK	Nikhil Prasad		5 June	
2019	Bhaskaran Pillai Technologies	Nikhil Prasad		28 June	
2019	Gym Boys	Nikhil Prasad		20 August	features Tovino Thomas in cameo
2019	Onam Sadhya	Nikhil Prasad	Karikku Team	7 September	
2019	Arrangement Kalyanam	Jeevan Stephen	Anu K. Aniyan	21 October	
2020	Babu & Mothalali Phone call	Karikku Team		27 March	COVID-19 awareness video
2020	Thug Amma	Karikku Team		10 May	Repost
2020	Bhaskaran Pillai from America	Nikhil Prasad		20 May	
2020	Smile Please	Jeevan Stephen	Karikku Team	18 August	
2020	Thiruvonam	Nikhil Prasad		31 August	Onam special
2020	Ulkka	Jeevan Stephen	Jeevan Stephen, Arjun Ratan, Anu K. Aniyan, Kiran Viyyath	8 October	
2020	Family Pack	Anu K. Aniyan		1 November	
2020	Happy Birthday	Jeevan Stephen	Jeevan Stephen, Anu K. Aniyan, Arjun Ratan	5 March	
2021	Ripper - The wanted killer	Nikhil Prasad	Karikku Team	3 April	Released through Netflix India YouTube channel, promotional video for Irul film
2021	Star	Anu K. Aniyan	Karikku Team	Karikku Team	
2022	Bingo! Ringa Ringa Rosa (Single Watch)	Krishna Chandran		27 May	Released as episodes on YouTube shorts
2023	Happy Onam	Nikhil Prasad		29 August	Onam special
2023	Tattadash	Binoy John	Krishna Chandran, Abijith Krishnan	22 December	
2024	Terminator	Krishnachandran	Krishna Chandran, Abijith Krishnan	15 June	
2026	Jail Chill	Abhijith Krishna	Karikku Team	20 March	
