= Amrita TV =

Malayalam satellite TV channel

Amrita Television
- Country: India
- Broadcast area: India; Australia; Canada; Europe; Middle East; United States
- Headquarters: Thiruvananthapuram, Kerala, India

Programming
- Language: Malayalam
- Picture format: SDTV

Ownership
- Owner: Mata Amritanandamayi Math

History
- Launched: 14 April 2005; 21 years ago

Links
- Website: www.amritatv.com

Availability

Streaming media
- Amrita.com/Live: Watch Live

Amrita Television is an Indian Malayalam-language free-to-air general Entertainment television channel owned by Mata Amritanandamayi Math. It was launched on 14 April 2005.

== Former shows ==
=== Serials ===
- Aanpirannol
- Aliyan VS Aliyan

=== Upcoming ===
- No1Momo

=== Shows ===
- Taste of Kerala
- Junior Genius
- Lal Salam (talk show)
- Kadhayallithu Jeevitham
