= Thattathin Marayathu (soundtrack) =

Soundtrack album by Shaan Rahman
- Released: 8 June 2012
- Recorded: 2012
- Genre: Feature film soundtrack
- Length: 24:48
- Language: Malayalam
- Labels: Satyam Audios; Mathrubhumi Music
- Producer: Shaan Rahman

Shaan Rahman chronology
The Metro (2012)	Thattathin Marayathu (2012)	Nam Duniya Nam Style (2013)

Thattathin Marayathu is the soundtrack to the 2012 film of the same name directed by Vineeth Sreenivasan starring Nivin Pauly and Isha Talwar. The soundtrack featured 10 songs composed by Shaan Rahman and lyrics written by Sreenivasan himself along with Anu Elizabeth Jose and Engandiyur Chandrasekharan. The soundtrack was released on 8 June 2012 through Satyam Audios and Mathrubhumi Music, to generally positive reviews from critics and the song "Muthuchippi Poloru" was a chartbuster upon release. Rahman was felicitated with several accolades for his work.

== Development ==
Thattathin Marayathu is Rahman's second collaboration with Sreenivasan after the latter's debut Malarvaadi Arts Club (2010). Sreenivasan and Rahman had a clear-headed view on how the musical treatment would work despite being clichéd. Rahman said that "He [Sreenivasan] wanted the music to be a velvet drape around the story, the kind that will create butterflies in the stomach" which intended to create songs that whisper into the souls of audience. During their formal jamming sessions, Rahman sketched the tunes for three of the songs for the film. The songs "Anuragathin Velayil" and "Muthuchippi Poloru" were composed within one-and-a-half hours.

The film also marked the debut of Anu Elizabeth Jose as a lyricist who wrote three songs for the album. When Rahman composed "Muthuchippi Poloru", Sreenivasan wanted the song to be written by a woman as he felt that a woman could bring in a different perspective. Later, Jose was brought forward to write the song. Jose felt that she had no experience as a lyricist, when she was offered to. But when Sreenivasan explained the situation and mood of the song, she "fell into the groove" which helped her write the other two songs "Syamambaram" and "Anuragam".

== Release ==
The film's audio launch was held on Kochi on 8 June 2012. The event was preceded by the film's cast and crew with Mammootty, Dulquer Salmaan, Kunchacko Boban and Fahadh Faasil preceding as the chief guests and they handed over the CD to M. V. Shreyas Kumar, the managing director of Mathrubhumi company. Satyam Audios co-distributed the soundtrack to digital and physical formats.

== Track listing ==
No.	Title	Lyrics	Singer(s)	Length
1.	"Anuraagathin Velayil"	Vineeth Sreenivasan	Vineeth Sreenivasan	4:56
2.	"Muthuchippi"	Anu Elizabeth Jose	Sachin Warrier, Remya Nambeesan	4:03
3.	"Thattathin Marayathe"	Vineeth Sreenivasan	Sachin Warrier	2:30
4.	"Anuragam"	Anu Elizabeth Jose	Rahul Subrahmanian	2:16
5.	"Shyaamambaram"	Vineeth Sreenivasan	Vineeth Sreenivasan	3:28
6.	"Praanante Naalangal"	Engandiyur Chandrasekharan	Yazin Nizar	2:01
7.	"Namosthuthe"	Traditional	Arun Alat	3:08
8.	"Anuragam" (Reprise)	Anu Elizabeth Jose	Divya S. Menon	2:10
9.	"Aayiram Kannumayi" (Slow version)	Bichu Thirumala	Vineeth Sreenivasan	1:42
10.	"Oh Sahiba" (Theme)	Traditional	Vineeth Sreenivasan	4:33
Total length:				24:48

== Reception ==
Music Aloud critic Vipin Nair rated 8.5/10 to the album stating "Reserving his best for Vineeth Sreenivasan as always, Shaan Rahman creates for Thattathin Marayathu another score that, while not diversely genred like Malarvadi Arts Club, still is one hell of a soundtrack!" Karthik Srinivasan of Milliblog wrote "The best part of this wonderful soundtrack – if one were to not complain about the short duration of the songs – is the supreme confidence it has in its melodies; not a single track that moves away from the overall serene feel." The Times of India critic Aswin J Kumar wrote "Shan Rahman’s melodies linger in the mind and Vineeth has visualised them with appeal". Anil R Nair of The New Indian Express complimented the music and visuals being "remarkable". Critic based at IndiaGlitz.com wrote "Excellent BG scores and songs by Shaan Rahman add to the Vineeth Sreenivasan's attempts to place viewers on a romantic trail."

The track "Muthuchippi Poloru" became chartbuster upon release, garnering around 6 lakh views on YouTube by July 2012. It was praised for its vocals as well as the picturisation, and also led Sachin Warrier and actress Remya Nambeesan becoming established names in the music industry. When Shaan Rahman was felicitated with Eenam Swaralaya award from veteran composer M. Jayachandran, the latter said that "Muthuchippi Poloru" was one of his favourite songs of the year apart from his own compositions.

== Accolades ==
Award (Note: Awards, festivals and organisations are in alphabetical order.)	Date of ceremony (Note: Date is linked to the article about the awards held that year, wherever possible.)	Category	Recipient(s) and nominee(s)	Result	Ref.
Filmfare Awards South	20 July 2013	Best Music Director – Malayalam	Shaan Rahman	Won	
Filmfare Awards South	20 July 2013	Best Male Playback Singer – Malayalam	Vineeth Sreenivasan for "Anuragathin Velayil"	Nominated	
Mirchi Music Awards South	26 August 2013	Song of the Year	"Muthuchippi Poloru"	Won	
Mirchi Music Awards South	26 August 2013	Album of the Year	Shaan Rahman	Won	
Mirchi Music Awards South	26 August 2013	Upcoming Male Vocalist of the Year	Vineeth Sreenivasan for "Anuragathin Velayil"	Nominated	
Mirchi Music Awards South	26 August 2013	Upcoming Female Vocalist of the Year	Remya Nambeesan for "Muthuchippi Poloru"	Nominated	
Mirchi Music Awards South	26 August 2013	Upcoming Lyricist of the Year	Anu Elizabeth Jose for "Muthuchippi Poloru"	Won	
Mirchi Music Awards South	26 August 2013	Upcoming Lyricist of the Year	Vineeth Sreenivasan for "Thattathin Marayathe"	Nominated	
Mirchi Music Awards South	26 August 2013	Album of the Year – Listener's choice	Shaan Rahman	Won	
Mirchi Music Awards South	26 August 2013	Song of the Year – Listener's choice	"Muthuchippi Poloru"	Nominated	
South Indian International Movie Awards	12–13 September 2013	Best Music Director – Malayalam	Shaan Rahman	Nominated	
South Indian International Movie Awards	12–13 September 2013	Best Lyricist – Malayalam	Anu Elizabeth Jose for "Muthuchippi Poloru"	Nominated	
South Indian International Movie Awards	12–13 September 2013	Best Male Playback Singer – Malayalam	Vineeth Sreenivasan for "Anuragathin Velayil"	Nominated	
Vanitha Film Awards	12 February 2013	Best Music Director	Shaan Rahman	Won	
Vanitha Film Awards	12 February 2013	Best Female Playback Singer	Remya Nambeesan for "Muthuchippi Poloru"	Nominated	
