= Thaaram Theertha Koodaram =

2023 movie by Arjun Prabhakaran and Gokul Ramakrishnan

- Movie poster
- Directed by: Gokul Ramakrishnan
- Written by: Arjun Prabhakaran; Gokul Ramakrishnan
- Produced by: Nishanth Nair
- Starring: Karthik Ramakrishnan
- Cinematography: Nikhil Surendran
- Edited by: Pareekshith
- Music by: Mejo Joseph
- Production company: Abhirami Productions
- Distributed by: Dream Big films
- Release date: 14 April 2023
- Running time: 125 minutes
- Country: India
- Language: Malayalam

Thaaram Theertha Koodaram is a 2023 Indian Malayalam-language family romantic film directed by Gokul Ramakrishnan and written by Arjun Prabhakaran and Gokul Ramakrishnan.

== Plot ==
Sanjay, a food delivery courier with bipolar disorder who is now abandoned by his family, tries to take care of a homeless woman and her younger sister in order to prove to his family that he has the ability to socialize, which he thinks will bring back their love and affection towards him. He secretly shares his room with the girls without the knowledge of the lodge manager. However, he starts to fall in love with the young woman, which complicates his plans.

== Cast ==
- Karthik Ramakrishnan as Sanju
- Nainita Mariya as Idhaya
- Ayn Sajid as Chikku
- Maala Parvathi as Lakshmi
- Vineeth Vishwam as Ajay
- Anagha Maria Varghese as Anagha
- Shankar Ramakrishnan as Regunath
- Vinodhini Vaidyanathan as Selvi
- Dayyana Hameed as Meera
- James Ellia as Prasad
- Unni Raja as Postman Unni
- Anagha Biju as Anu
- Fukru as Sonu

== Production ==
This marks the second collabartion between Arjun Prabhakaran and Gokul Ramakrishan, after 2021 film Bannerghatta, as well as actor Karthik Ramakrishan's second project as a lead actor with them. Mejo Joseph joined the team as a music director.

Karthik Ramakrishnan, Arjun And Gokul have previously worked together in movies like 32aam Adhyayam 23aam Vaakyam, Shibu, Bannerghatta, etc.

== Soundtrack ==
Thaaram Theertha Koodaram

Soundtrack album by Mejo Joseph
- Released: 15 April 2023
- Recorded: 2023
- Genre: Feature film soundtrack
- Label: T-Series
- Producer: Abhirami Productions

Mejo Joseph chronology
Innu Muthal (2021)	Thaaram Theertha Koodaram (2023)	Third Murder (2023)

Lyrics are written by Manu Manjith, Harinarayanan and Arun Alat, and music is composed by Mejo Joseph.

No.	Title	Artist(s)	Length
1.	"Raave"	Harish Sivaramakrishnan	4:21
2.	"Nenjellam"	Hesham Abdul Wahab	4:00
3.	"Neeye Neeye"	Jyotsna Radhakrishnan	3:30
4.	"Koo Koo"	Judith	3:20

== Release ==
Thaaram Theertha Koodaram was released theatrically on 14 April 2023.

== Reception ==
Anna Matthews, a critic at The Times of India wrote, "The film is surprisingly impactful." RB Srilekha, a critic from Malayala Manorama wrote, "This movie will stay close to our heart after watching."
