= Mejo Joseph =

Mejo Josseph
- Also known as: Mejjo Josseph
- Born: Mejo Josseph; 28 January 1981 (age 45)
- Genres: World, Hard rock, Pop music, Gospel, Folk music
- Occupations: Music director, Playback singer, Actor
- Years active: 2006–present

Mejo Joseph is a music director from South India. He made his debut in the Malayalam movie Notebook. He has composed several songs multilingually for films in Malayalam, Tamil, Telugu and Hindi. He also has several albums and singles in the aforementioned languages to his credit and is also a composer and vocalist for several adfilms.

== Personal life ==
Mejo was born to Joseph and Rosemary, belonging to a Roman Catholic Syrian Christian family from Thrissur, Kerala, on 28 January 1981. He did his schooling at Don Bosco High School, Irinjalakuda. Mejo did his Bachelors Degree in Commerce from Christ College, Irinjalakuda and he completed his education with the Masters Degree in Business Administration in Marketing and Finance from Sree Saraswathi Thyagaraja College, Pollachi. He is also a diploma holder in Sound Engineering from the Riyan Institute of Film Technology, Ernakulam. Mejo is married to Merrin, a businesswoman. The couple has four children, including Abdiel Joseph. He is the brother-in-law of the popular filmmaker Rosshan Andrrews.

== Career ==
Mejo has been passionate about music since his early childhood and begin his quest and experimentation with music through his debut in 2006 through the Malayalam movie Notebook which was directed by his brother-in-law Roshan Andrews. The soundtrack of this film won him immediate attention. He debuted as an actor too, in this film through his heartwarming character 'Firoz', a music enthusiast. He later worked with Johny Antony for the movie Cycle. The music of Cycle also became a superhit and Mejo's talent was highly acclaimed.

Mejo has been an Executive Member of the FEFKA Music Directors Union (FEMU) and currently holds the position of the Vice President for the same.

Mejo debuted as a Producer for his 2021 film Innu Muthal by being one among the four producers under the banner THE GREAT INDIAN CINEMAS. In 2023 he did music for Thaaram Theertha Koodaram starring Karthik Ramakrishnan written and directed by Arjun Prabhakaran and Gokul Ramakrishnan respectively.

== Discography ==
=== As Music Director and Singer ===
Year	Film	Songs	BGM	Language	Singer
2006	Notebook	check	X mark	Malayalam	Yes
2009	Cycle	check	X mark	Malayalam	No
2010	Kanmazha Peyyum Munpe	check	X mark	Malayalam	No
2011	Traffic	check	check	Malayalam	Yes
2012	Chapters	check	check	Malayalam	Yes
2012	Entry	check	check	Malayalam	No
2012	Telugabbai	check	X mark	Telugu Language	Yes
2013	Chennaiyil Oru Naal	check	check	Tamil Language	No
2014	Hangover	check	check	Malayalam	No
2014	Konthayum Poonoolum	check	check	Malayalam	No
2014	Law point	check	X mark	Malayalam	No
2017	Y	X mark	check	Malayalam	No
2017	C/O Saira Banu	check	check	Malayalam	No
2019	Vaarikkuzhiyile Kolapathakam	check	check	Malayalam	No
2019	Vaarthakal Ithuvare	check	check	Malayalam	No
2021	Cheraathukal	check	check	Malayalam	
2021	Innu Muthal	check	check	Malayalam	Yes
2022	Njaan Michael	check	check	Malayalam	No
2023	Kaipola	check	check	Malayalam	Yes
2023	Thaaram Theertha Koodaram movie	check	check	Malayalam	No
2023	Nannayikoode	check	check	Malayalam	No
2023	Nanchinavadu	check	check	Telugu Language	No
2024	Gangs Of Sukumara Kurup	check	X mark	Malayalam	No
2024	Oshana (Movie)	check	check	Malayalam	Yes
2026	The Third Murder	check	check	Malayalam	Yes

=== As actor ===
Year	Film	Role	Notes
2006	Notebook	Firoz	Debut
2019	Vaarikkuzhiyile Kolapathakam	Eldose	

=== Albums and Singles ===
Year	Album	Genre	Language	Notes
2004	Manicheppu	World	Malayalam	Jyotsna Radhakrishnan won the Kerala State Film Critics Award for the song Hridayathin Manicheppu
2009	Naattile Thaaram by RADIO MANGO	Pop	Malayalam	
2016	Genesis	Pop	Malayalam, Tamil	
2017	Destiny - THE DREAM (Single)	Pop	English	
2018	There is no Goodbye (Single)	Pop	English	
2021	Mayathe (Single)	Pop	Malayalam	
2021	Kathakal Neele (Single)	Pop	Malayalam	
2021	Mystery (Single)	Pop	English	
2022	En Pathi Nee Thanedee (Single)	Pop	Tamil	

=== Ad films ===
Year	Brand
2023	Willy White
2023	Lifecare Pharmaceuticals
2023	Quality Food Products
2021	Walkaroo
2021	Khind
2020	Favourite Homes
2018	Lifecare Adult Pullups
2018	KIMS Liver Transplant
2017	Joy Alukkas
2016	Somans
2016	Mahalekshmi Silks the Classics
2015	Kent Palm
2015	Kitex Dezire
2015	Kitex Trawellday
2014	Mahalakshmi Silks
