= Remya Nambeesan filmography =

Filmography article

Ramya Nambeesan is an Indian actress and playback singer who appears in Malayalam and Tamil films.

== Films ==
Key
†	Denotes film or TV productions that have not yet been released

=== Malayalam films ===
Year	Title	Role	Notes
2000	Sayahnam	Amala	Debut film as child artist
2001	Narendran Makan Jayakanthan Vaka	Sethulakshmi	
2002	Sthithi	Ramya	
2003	Gramaphone	Sachidanandan's sister	
2003	Meerayude Dukhavum Muthuvinte Swapnavum	Ashwathy's sister	
2004	Perumazhakkalam	Neelima	
2005	Annorikkal	Beena	
2006	Aanachandam	Gowri	Debut in Lead role
2007	Changathipoocha	Indhu Sreedharan Nair	
2007	Panthaya Kozhi	Maya	
2007	Soorya Kireedam	Pooja Vishwanathan Nair	
2007	Chocolate	Susanna	
2007	Atheetham	Amritha	
2007	Naalu Pennungal	Podimol	
2008	Shalabam	Meera	
2008	Anthiponvettam	Vanitha	
2009	Nammal Thammil	Uma	
2009	Black Dalia	Dancer	Special appearance
2011	Traffic	Swetha	
2011	Chaappa Kurish	Sonia	Nominated, Filmfare Award for Best Supporting Actress – Malayalam
2012	Bachelor Party	Special appearance	Special appearance in the song "Vijana Surabhi"
2012	Ivan Megharoopan	Rajalekshmi	SIIMA Award for Best Female Playback Singer; Nominated – Filmfare Award for Best Female Playback Singer – Malayalam
2012	Husbands in Goa	Veena	
2012	Ayalum Njanum Thammil	Dr. Supriya	
2013	Oru Yathrayil	Soumini teacher	Segment – Marichavarude Kadal
2013	Ithu Pathiramanal	Sara	
2013	English: An Autumn in London	Gauri	
2013	Up & Down - Mukalil Oralundu	Kalamandalam Prasanna	
2013	Pigman	Sneha	
2013	Left Right Left	Jennifer/Ramya	
2013	Arikil Oraal	Veena	
2013	Philips and the Monkey Pen	Sameera Roy	
2013	Nadan	Jyothi	Kerala Film Critics Association Awards for Best Actress
2015	Lailaa O Lailaa	Ramya	
2015	Lukka Chuppi	Renuka	
2015	Jilebi	Silpa	
2015	Saigal Padukayanu	Deepa	
2017	Honey Bee 2.5	Herself	Cameo appearance
2019	Virus	Raji	
2020	Anjaam Pathiraa	Fathima Anwar	
2022	Lalitham Sundaram	Sophia	Disney+ Hotstar release
2022	Peace	Dr.Angel	
2023	B 32 Muthal 44 Vare	Malini	
2024	Her	Reshma	ManoramaMAX release

=== Other language films ===
Year	Title	Role	Language	Notes
2005	Oru Naal Oru Kanavu	Vanaja	Tamil	Tamil debut
2008	Andamaina Manasulo	Sandhya	Telugu	Telugu debut
2008	Raman Thediya Seethai	Vidhya Manikkavel	Tamil	
2009	Saarai Veerraju	Dhanalakshmi	Telugu	
2010	Aattanayagann	Radhika	Tamil	
2011	Ilaignan	Ramya	Tamil	
2011	Kullanari Koottam	Priya	Tamil	
2011	Nuvvila	Rani	Telugu	
2012	Pizza	Anu	Tamil	
2013	Telugabbai	Chandamaama	Telugu	
2014	Damaal Dumeel	Meera	Tamil	
2015	Naalu Policeum Nalla Irundha Oorum	Subha	Tamil	
2016	Sethupathi	Malarvizhi	Tamil	
2016	Style King	Ramya	Kannada	Kannada debut
2016	Saithan	Jayalakshmi	Tamil	Cameo Appearance
2017	Sathya	Swetha	Tamil	
2018	Mercury	Blind man's wife	Sound	
2018	Seethakaathi	Herself	Tamil	
2019	Agni Devi	Deepa	Tamil	
2019	Natpuna Ennanu Theriyuma	Shruti	Tamil	
2021	Endraavathu Oru Naal	Rasathi	Tamil	
2021	Plan Panni Pannanum	Amble	Tamil	
2022	My Dear Bootham	Thirunavukarasu's mother	Tamil	
2022	Estate	Durga Venugopal	Tamil	
2023	Bagheera	Vedhavalli	Tamil	
2023	Tamilarasan	Leena	Tamil	
2023	Raththam	Keerthi	Tamil	

== Television series ==
Year	Web series	Role	Language	Platform	Notes
2021	Navarasa	Lakshmi	Tamil	Netflix	Segment: Summer of '92
2022	Kaiyum Kalavum	Housewife	Tamil	SonyLIV	
2022	Modern Love Chennai	Revathi	Tamil	Amazon Prime Video	Episode 5: "Paravai Kootil Vaazhum Maangal"
2023	Dayaa	Kavitha Naidu	Telugu	Disney+Hotstar	
2024	Thalaimai Seyalagam	Amudhavalli	Tamil	ZEE5	
2024	Goli Soda Rising	Bhargavi	Tamil	Disney+Hotstar	

== Television ==
Role	Work / Program	Channel
Host	Hello, Good Evening	Kairali TV
Judge	Sa Re Ga Ma Pa Seniors - 3	Zee Tamil
Judge	Super Star Junior	Amrita TV
Judge	Sun Singer	Sun TV
Judge	Top Singer	Flowers TV
Judge	Super 4 Season 2	Mazhavil Manorama
Judge	D 4 Dance, D 3 Dance	Mazhavil Manorama
Judge	Dancing Stars Season 1	Asianet TV
Tv series	Padmaja Padavukal Irangunnu; Sakunam; Amrapalli	DD Malayalam
Guest	Kanni Theevu Ullasa Ulagam 2.0	Colors Tamil
Guest	MasterChef India – Tamil	Sun TV
Guest	Super 4 Season 2	Mazhavil Manorama
Guest	Mambhazham	Kairali TV
