= Pookkaalam =

2023 Indian film by Ganesh Raj

- Theatrical release poster
- Directed by: Ganesh Raj
- Screenplay by: Ganesh Raj
- Produced by: Thomas Thiruvalla; Vinod Shornur
- Starring: Vijayaraghavan; Basil Joseph; Vineeth Sreenivasan; K. P. A. C. Leela
- Cinematography: Anend C. Chandran
- Edited by: Midhun Murali
- Music by: Sachin Warrier
- Production companies: CNC Cinemas; Thomas Thiruvalla Films
- Release date: 8 April 2023
- Country: India
- Language: Malayalam

Pookkaalam (transl. Spring) is a 2023 Indian Malayalam-language comedy drama film written and directed by Ganesh Raj. It stars Vijayaraghavan as a 100-year-old man, with K. P. A. C. Leela paired opposite him.

Pookkaalam was released on 8 April 2023. It was featured at the 54th IFFI Indian Panorama section.

== Plot ==
Pookkaalam is the story of the lives of Ittoop and Kochu Thresiamma and the people surrounding them. They live with their large family and are preparing to celebrate their wedding anniversary. Their peaceful life changes when the family finds an old love letter addressed to Kochuthresia.

The letter makes everyone wonder if Kochuthresia had a relationship before her marriage. This creates misunderstandings and arguments within the family. Ittoop wishes for a divorce and looks towards finding junior lawyer Jikkumon, while the kids are off to find someone or themselves to defend their mother. Ittyavira is hurt by the discovery, while Kochuthresia does not want to talk about her past.

As the family learns more about the letter they discover the truth behind it and realize that it does not change the love and trust the couple has shared for many years. The incident helps the family understand the importance of honesty, forgiveness and accepting the past.

In the end, the misunderstandings are cleared, and Ittyavira and Kochuthresia celebrate their anniversary with their family showing that love and trust can grow stronger over time.

== Cast ==
- Vijayaraghavan as Ittoop
- Basil Joseph as Advocate Jikkumon
- Vineeth Sreenivasan as Judge Ravi
- K. P. A. C. Leela as Maya Thattakathu Kochu Thresiamma, Ittoop's wife
  - Nandini Gopalakrishnan as young Kochu Thresiamma
- Roshan Mathew as Johnnymon, Ittoop's eldest son
- Sarasa Balussery as Alamma, Ittoop's eldest daughter
- Suhasini Maniratnam as Clara, Ittoop's second daughter
  - Noila Francy as young Clara
- Radha Gomathy as Rosamma, Ittoop's third daughter
- Ganga Meera as Elsamma, Ittoop's youngest daughter
- Jagadish as Puthanveetil Kochousepp
- Johny Antony as Advocate Narayanan Pillai
- Annu Antony as Elsi, Elsamma's daughter
- Arun Kurian as Susheel, Elsi's fiancé
- Abu Salim as Venu, Elsamma's husband
- V. Suresh Thampanoor as Xavier
- Sarath Sabha as Father Gabriel, Elsamma's son
- Amal Raj and Kamal Raj as Michael and Angelo
- Kavya and Navya as Dinsy and Donna
- Arun Ajikumar as Guinness
- Kanakalatha as Susheel's mother
- Harish Pengan as Kochousepp's son
- Kochu Preman as the sexton
- Ranjini Haridas as the astrologer
- Shebin Benson as K. C. Unnikrishnan
- Gilu Joseph as Narayanan Pillai's wife
- Honey Rose as herself
- Anjali Thachillath as Adv. Anjali

== Production ==
After his debut film Aanandam, director Ganesh Raj took 4 years to complete the script of Pookkaalam, and he penned a note as "Pookkaalam... The season of growth, change, and Love" along with the first look poster. This film was bankrolled by Vinod Shornur for CNC Cinemas in association with Thomas Thiruvalla's Thomas Thiruvalla Films. Sachin Warrier was signed to provide the music and background score of the film. Actress Honey Rose also plays a cameo role.

Principal photography started on 13 April 2022. The filming wrapped up on 14 December after 37 days of shooting.

== Reception ==
=== Critical reception ===
Princy Alexander of Onmanorama noted that the film is "a fresh take" on elderly couple relationships and compared the film to Oru Cheru Punchiri, and wrote: "Though the movie dwells on a serious subject like a marital discord, Ganesh Raj's 'Pookkaalam' is not a tear-jerker. Instead, he relies on the youthful vibrancy that was the pillar of his earlier work to narrate this film, too. … Despite the good performances, the weak dialogues and the failure to explore some of the characters further affect the film, which is otherwise an interesting family drama." Sajin Shriijth of Cinema Express gave 3.5/5 stars and wrote: "Despite some of its rough edges, Pookkaalam is what I would call a wholesome family entertainer ideal for the holidays. There are places where the exaggerated acting from Basil Joseph, Vineeth Sreenivasan, Johny Antony, and others doesn't land, but their presence also makes Pookkaalam lively when necessary. In a way, they remind us of some of our family members. We don't always like what they do, but we can't live without them either."

== Awards ==
=== National Film Awards ===
- 71st National Film Awards (presented in August 2025 for films certified in 2023)
  - Best Supporting Actor – Vijayaraghavan
  - Best Editing – Midhun Murali

=== Kerala Film Critics Association Awards ===
- Kerala Film Critics Association Awards 2023
  - Best Actor – Vijayaraghavan
  - Best Supporting Actress – K. P. A. C. Leela
  - Best Makeup - Ronex Xavier
