= Karthik Ramakrishnan =

Indian actor

- Born: Palakkad, Kerala, India
- Occupation: Actor
- Years active: 2015–present

Karthik Ramakrishnan is an Indian actor who primarily works in Malayalam cinema.

== Career ==
32aam adhyayam 23aam Vaakyam (2015) directed by Arjun Prabhakaran and Gokul Ramakrishnan was the first theatre-released film in his career. Karthik acted the lead role in the 2019 movie Shibu directed by Arjun Prabhakaran and Gokul Ramakrishnan. He was mainly noted for his performances in the film Thrayam, Signature, Bannerghatta, Thaaram Theertha Koodaram.

== Filmography ==
Year	Title	Role	Notes	Ref
2015	32aam adhyayam 23aam vaakyam	College lecturer		
2019	Shibu	Shibu		
2021	Bannerghatta	Ashiq		
2022	Signature	Muthu		
2023	Thaaram Theertha Koodaram	Sanjay		
2024	Thrayam			
