= Tanish =

Indian Telugu actor

- Born: Tanish Alladi
- Occupation: Actor
- Years active: 1998–present

Tanish Alladi is an Indian actor who works in Telugu films. He worked as a child actor before starring in films such as Nacchavule (2008), Ride (2009), Telugabbai (2013), Pandavulu Pandavulu Thummeda (2014), and Nakshatram (2017). He has also was one of the contestants on the reality TV show Bigg Boss Telugu 2, and finished in third place.

== Early life and family ==
Tanish was born to Alladi Yesuvardhan Babu and Saraswati. He has 2 younger brothers named Alladi Vamsi Krishna and Alladi Kushwanth.

== Career ==
In 2008 and 2009 he appeared in two successful films Nachavule and Ride. In 2012 he appeared in Mem Vayasuku Vacham with Niti Taylor. In the same year, another movie Chanakyudu with Ishita Dutta under the direction of Gotteganti Srinivas, was released.

In 2013 he worked with director Avinash O Sridhar for Telugabbai. Co-starring Ramya Nambeesan, the film did not do well at the box office. After many solo failures at the box office, Tanish also starred in two big multistarrers. The first was the moderately successful Pandavulu Pandavulu Thummeda (2014), in which he starred alongside Mohan Babu, Vishnu Manchu, Manoj Manchu, Varun Sandesh, Hansika Motwani, and Pranitha Subhash. In 2017, he starred in another ensemble film directed by Krishna Vamsi, Nakshatram, in which he starred alongside Sundeep Kishan and Sai Dharam Tej.

== Filmography ==
Year	Film	Role(s)	Notes
1998	Premante Idera		Child artist
1999	Prema Katha	Subba Rao	Child artist
1999	Alludugaaru Vachcharu		Child artist
2000	Yuvakudu		Child artist
2000	Ninne Premistha		Child artist
2000	Chala Bagundi	Young Shivaji	Child artist
2000	Devullu	Lord Ayyappa	Child artist
2002	Vasu	Arun's friend	Child artist
2002	Manmadhudu	Harika's Brother	Child artist
2006	Evandoi Srivaru	Divya's Brother	Child artist
2006	Bhageeratha	Young Bullabbai	Child artist
2008	Nacchavule	Luv Kumar	Debut as Lead actor
2009	Ride	Mahesh	
2010	Mouna Ragam	Chandu	
2011	Kodipunju	Abhimanyu	
2012	Mem Vayasuku Vacham	Lakshman "Lucky"	
2012	Chanakyudu	Chanakya	
2013	Telugabbai	Arun	
2014	Pandavulu Pandavulu Thummeda	Lucky	
2015	Superstar Kidnap	Michael	Cameo appearance
2016	Oh My God		
2017	Nakshatram	Rahul	
2017	Premika		
2018	Rangu	Pawan Kumar "Lara"	
2018	Desa Dimmari		
2021	Maro Prasthanam	Shiva	
2023	Vanakkam Salaam		
2026	Razor	Vishnu	

=== Television ===
Year	Show	Role(s)	Notes
2018	Bigg Boss Telugu 2	Himself	TV show
