= Roudram 2018 =

2019 Indian Malayalam-language film

- Theatrical release poster
- Directed by: Jayaraj
- Written by: Jayaraj
- Produced by: Suresh Kumar Muttath; K. Balachandran Nilambur
- Starring: Renji Panicker; K. P. A. C. Leela; Nikhil Renji Panicker; Binu Pappu; Sabitha Jayaraj
- Cinematography: Nikhil S. Praveen
- Edited by: Jinu Sobha
- Music by: Sachin Shankor Mannath
- Production company: Prakriti Pictures
- Distributed by: Mountain River Films
- Release date: 18 October 2019
- Running time: 1 hour 59 minutes
- Country: India
- Language: Malayalam

Roudram 2018 is a 2019 Indian Malayalam-language drama film written and directed by Jayaraj. It stars Renji Panicker and K. P. A. C. Leela. The film was released on 18 October 2019.

== Plot ==
The film's storyline is drawn from real-life events that unfolded in central Travancore during the severe floods that Kerala faced in 2018.

== Cast ==
- Renji Panicker as Narayanan
- K. P. A. C. Leela as Marykutty
- Nikhil Renji Panicker as young Narayanan
- N.P. Nisa as young Marykutty
- Binu Pappu as Taxi driver
- Sabitha Jayaraj as Pennamma

== Release ==
Roudram 2018 was released on 18 October 2019 in India, with a subsequent release on 25 October 2019 worldwide. The film became a commercial success at the box office.

== Reception ==
Deepa Antony of The Times of India awarded the movie a 4 out of 5-star rating and stated, "The film stands as a testament to humanity's vulnerability when faced with the immense power of nature. Through 'Roudram 2018,' Jayaraj once again showcases his mastery in filmmaking. By addressing the sensitive theme of the Kerala floods, which remains vivid in our memories, he skillfully crafts a touching narrative of love and companionship." Padmakumar K. of Onmanorama described it as "An ode to moments of life and nature's fury." A critic from Samayam gave a positive review to the film.
