= Muthuchippi Poloru =

Song by Shaan Rahman (composer) Sachin Warrier and Remya Nambeesan (singers)

from the album Thattathin Marayathu
- Language: Malayalam
- Released: 8 June 2012
- Recorded: 2012
- Genre: Feature film soundtrack
- Length: 4:03
- Label: Satyam Audios
- Composer: Shaan Rahman
- Lyricist: Anu Elizabeth Jose

"Muthuchippy Poloru" is a Malayalam song composed by Shaan Rahman that featured in the film Thattathin Marayathu. The lyrics was written by Anu Elizabeth Jose. It was sung by Sachin Warrier and actress Remya Nambeesan. The song was one of the most popular Malayalam songs of 2012 and won several awards. It was later reused in the Telugu remake of Thattathin Marayathu, Saheba Subramanyam, as "Muddu Muddu".

== Reception ==
The song was released as part of Thattathin Marayathu's soundtrack on 8 June 2012. By late July the song had received more than six lakh hits on YouTube, with The Hindu writing that it was "on its way to becoming an online sensation".

musicaloud.com wrote, "another [...] addictive (song is) Muthuchippi that sees an interesting combo of the male vocalist Sachin Warrier going the higher octave and the female singer (Ramya Nambeeshan) the lower. While the sarangi stands out in the background, the percussion that alternates between tabla and ghatam is equally alluring. Ramya sounds quite impressive in the base voice". Composer M. Jayachandran stated that it was his favorite song of the year.

== Picturization ==
The picturization of this soundtrack received positive reviews along with the track. The song was picturized mainly on the lead characters Nivin Pauly and Isha Talwar. Aju Varghese, Bhagath Manuel and Ahmed Sidhique also were part of this song.

== Awards ==
- Mirchi Music Award South for Best Lyricist – Anu Elizabeth Jose
- Asiavision Award New Sensation in Singing (Female) – Remya Nambeesan
- Vanitha Film Award for Best Female Playback Singer – Remya Nambeesan
