= Cheena Trophy =

2023 Indian film by Anil Lal

- Theatrical release poster
- Directed by: Anil Lal
- Written by: Anil Lal
- Produced by: Anup Mohan; Ashlin Mary Joy; Lijo Ulahannan
- Starring: Dhyan Sreenivasan; Kendy Zirdo; Jaffar Idukki
- Cinematography: Santhosh Anima
- Edited by: Ranjan Abraham
- Music by: Sooraj Santhosh; Varkey
- Production company: Presidential Movies International Pvt. Ltd.
- Distributed by: Crescent Release
- Release date: 8 December 2023
- Running time: 122 minutes
- Country: India
- Language: Malayalam

Cheena Trophy is a 2023 Indian Malayalam-language comedy-drama film written and directed by Anil Lal in his directorial debut. The film stars Dhyan Sreenivasan, alongside Kendy Zirdo, Jaffar Idukki, Devika Ramesh (in her debut film), Johny Antony, K. P. A. C. Leela and Sudheesh.

== Cast ==
- Dhyan Sreenivasan as Rajesh
- Kendy Zirdo as Sheng
- Jaffar Idukki as Vijayan
- Devika Ramesh as Theresa
- Usha as Usha
- Johny Antony as Pavithran Sakhavu
- KPAC Leela as Powlin/Vallyammachi
- Sudheesh as Das
- Varada as Raji
- Bittu Thomas as Reji
- Sijo as Shafi
- Jordi Poonjar as Police Sub Inspector
- Sunil Babu as Thampi
- Lali as Mary
- Ponnamma Babu as Lalitha
- Chef Pillai as cameo role
- Narayanankutty as Astrologer Shibu
- Umesh S Nair as Bank Manager

== Production ==
Cheena Trophy marks the directorial debut of Anil Lal. The film is jointly produced by Anup Mohan, Ashlin Mary Joy and Lijo Ulahannan under the banner of Presidential Movies Private Limited.

== Music ==
The music is composed by Sooraj Santhosh and Varkey. The audio rights were acquired by Manorama Music. The first song titled "Sanchari" was released on 14 October 2023, sung by Arackal Nandakumar and written by Anil Lal. Ashtaman Pillai, a visually-challenged musician, made his debut as a playback singer with the song titled "Choodarum".

== Release ==
Cheena Trophy was initially planned to release on 6 October 2023, but was postponed and released in theatres on 8 December 2023.
