= Nakshatram (film) =

2017 Indian film by Krishna Vamsi

- Film poster
- Directed by: Krishna Vamsi
- Written by: Krishna Vamsi
- Produced by: K. Srinivasulu; S. Venugopal; Sajju
- Starring: Sai Dharam Tej; Sundeep Kishan; Tanish; Regina Cassandra; Pragya Jaiswal; Prakash Raj
- Cinematography: Srikanth Naroj
- Edited by: Siva Y. Prasad
- Music by: Bheems Ceciroleo
- Production companies: Sri Chakra Media; Butta Bomma Creations; Win Win Win Creations
- Release date: 4 August 2017
- Running time: 162 minutes
- Country: India
- Language: Telugu

Nakshatram (English: Star) is a 2017 Indian Telugu-language cop action-drama film which was written and directed by Krishna Vamsi in his 20th directorial film. Jointly produced by K. Srinivasulu, S. Venugopal and Sajju, it features Sundeep Kishan, Tanish, Regina Cassandra, Pragya Jaiswal, and Prakash Raj in the lead roles, while J. D. Chakravarthy and Sivaji Raja play supporting roles with Sai Dharam Tej in an extended special appearance. It was released on 4 August 2017 to negative reviews. It was dubbed in Hindi as Mass Masala.

== Plot ==
Rama Rao (Sundeep Kishan) is an aspiring police officer who was born into a police family - his great-grandfather, grandfather, and father have all served in the police department. To carry out the family legacy, he dreams of becoming an SI and serving society, so he strives hard to achieve his goal. However, he was unable to qualify for the job for various reasons. That is when he decides to perform the duties of a cop even without wearing the uniform.

Meanwhile, following a bomb blast that claimed many innocent lives, Parasuramaiah IPS (Prakash Raj), the honest police commissioner of Hyderabad, vows to rid the city of terrorist activities. He forms a crack team led by dynamic cop Alexander IPS (Sai Dharam Tej) for the purpose. Meanwhile, Rama Rao gets into a tiff with Rahul (Tanish), the wayward son of Parasuramaiah.

Due to the quarrel, Rama Rao, when going for his police exam interview, gets attacked by Rahul and ends up being late for the exam and thus not getting selected. A grieved Rama Rao wears a police uniform gifted by his lover Jamuna and starts police duty himself. During one such act, he stops a car filled with explosives, but the car accidentally explodes. Investigating this explosion through CCTV footage, Parasuramiah notices a police uniform with Alexander's name labeled and sends Kiran Reddy (Pragya Jaiswal) to bring Rama Rao to him. Rama Rao confesses in front of Parasuramaiah that he did police duty, but Parasuramaiah wants to know where Alexander is.

While coming back, Rama Rao questions Jamuna's father Sitharaman (Sivaji Raja), who was formerly a police constable and is now a heavy drunkard. Sitharam tells a flashback of how Alexander got killed by Rahul and his friends brutally by injecting heavy narcotic poison into him from all sides. They fit a time bomb on Alexander and release him in the center of the market, as narcotics Alexander falls on the woman and gets beaten and humiliated. Still, Alexander runs to the top floor of a building, explodes, and dies.

Rama Rao, hearing this flashback, decides to end Rahul's evil but finally gets attacked in the same way as Alexander and gets released to the middle of the function as a human bomb to a function attended by the home minister, with remote control on Rahul's mobile phone. Sitharam hits the phone away. Meanwhile, Rama Rao manages to enter the car of the minister who has a mobile signal jammer. Now, Parasuramaiah, surprised at this behavior, stands in doubt. Rahul tries to enter and wants to kill Rama Rao, but Kiran, although previously injured, shoots and kills Rahul.

== Cast ==
- Sai Dharam Tej as A.C.P Alexander IPS (Extended cameo appearance)
- Sundeep Kishan as Rama Rao, later Sub-Inspector
- Tanish as Rahul, Parasuramaiah's son
- Pragya Jaiswal as Kiran Reddy IPS
- Prakash Raj as C.P Parasuramaiah's IPS
- Sivaji Raja, as Constable Sitharam; works under Parasuramaiah's personal security, Jamuna's father and Rama Rao's maternal uncle, Alexander And Kiran Reddy Assistant
- Regina Cassandra as Jamuna, a dance choreographer and cousin to Rama Rao and Sitaram's daughter
- J. D. Chakravarthy as HM of Telangana Ramachandra Naidu, Parasuramaiah's best friend (Cameo appearance)
- Raghu Babu as Sub-Inspector Ramdas; Rama Rao's mentor
- Brahmaji as Gopaldas
- Sai Kiran as Police Constable and Rama Rao's father
- Thulasi Shivamani as Rama Rao's mother
- Viva Harsha as Dance Master
- Mukhtar Khan as Mukhtar, a hired arms dealer and a contract killer
- Duvvasi Mohan as Auto Driver
- Venu Yeldandi
- Maanas Nagulapalli as Rahul's friend
- Shriya Saran as an item number in the song "Time Ledu Guru"

== Soundtrack ==
The music was composed by Bheems Ceciroleo and released by Aditya Music.

Nakshatram

Soundtrack album by Bheems Ceciroleo
- Released: Jul 5, 2017
- Recorded: 2017
- Genre: Soundtrack
- Length: 19:09
- Label: Aditya Music
- Producer: Bheems Ceciroleo

Bheems Ceciroleo chronology
Angel (2017)	Nakshatram (2017)	PSV Garuda Vega (2017)

Track list
No.	Title	Lyrics	Singer(s)	Length
1.	"Laayire Laayire"	Kasarla Shyam	Bheems Ceciroleo, Kasarla Shyam, Raghuram	3:29
2.	"Pedaviki Nuvvante"	Ananta Sriram	Nayana Nair, Anurag Kulkarni	3:11
3.	"Hello Pillagada"	Sri Mani	Aishwarya Dasari, Saisharan	3:09
4.	"Ey Papa"	Ananta Sriram	Bheems Ceciroleo	3:39
5.	"Sudigalalley"	Balaji	Hari Gowra	2:27
6.	"Time Ledu Guru"	Kasarla Shyam	Mohana Bhogaraju	3:14
Total length:				19:09

== Reception ==
A critic from The Hindu wrote that "After 166 minutes of watching one too many gun shots, hearing full-throated cries, high decibel dialogue deliveries and loud music, it felt good when it all ended". A critic from The Times of India wrote that "Nakshatram is clearly Krishna Vamsi’s tribute to the ‘men in khaki’. Having said that, barring Rama Rao’s aspirations and characterisation, the drama evokes a sense of déjà vu".
