= IG (film) =

2009 film by B. Unnikrishnan

- Theatrical release poster
- Directed by: B. Unnikrishnan
- Written by: B. Unnikrishnan
- Produced by: Mahi
- Starring: Suresh Gopi; Govind Padmasoorya; Nandini; Lakshmi; Ashish Vidyarthi
- Cinematography: Shamdat Sainudeen
- Music by: Songs: M. Jayachandran; Score: Rajamani
- Production company: Super Star Films
- Distributed by: Super Star Films
- Release date: 3 April 2009 (India)
- Running time: 121 minutes
- Country: India
- Language: Malayalam

IG – Inspector General is a 2009 Indian Malayalam-language action drama film written and directed by B. Unnikrishnan. The film stars Suresh Gopi in the title lead role, with Govind Padmasoorya, Nandini and Ashish Vidyarthi in supporting roles.

== Plot ==
In Kerala, IG Durga Prasad is the head of Traffic Police, who takes into custody a gang of criminals involved in hawala transactions. The CM Ramachandran calls a meeting to ascertain the source of the money. Actually, the money is intended for terrorist activities. Knowing the serious situation, Ramachandran orders to form the ATS squad, where Durga is made as the chief of the squad. DGP Varghese and DGP Intelligence Yoonus provide complete necessary support to him. Once a week, he has to report the developments to Ramachandran. It is at this time when an allegation comes out that Durga is harassing some people who are suspected to be encouraging the terrorists.

Scaria Zachariah, a business tycoon, is the master behind the blasts that occurred in Kerala and the terrorist groups along with Yasir Shah, an infamous terrorist. The city police commissioner Vijayabhaskar, who is a corrupt cop, is an ally of Scaria who is responsible for instigating riots in the slums. One or two people in the department itself are against Durga. Though under the heavy pressure, Durga does not give up the enquiry, where everyone encourages him and allows him to carry on with the mission after knowing about the seriousness of the situation. Durga tries his level best to put an end to the terrorist activities. With the order from Ramachandran and Philip, Durga arrests Vijayabhaskar, who was the murderer of Home Secretary Paul Joseph and who also had links with the terrorists.

Durga finds out about the terrorists's plans and hideouts, where he goes there for the endgame. Durga captures Scaria and Yasir in Rameswaram. After a big fight, Durga confronts and defeats Scaria's and Yasir's men. Scaria brings Durga's younger brother Vinod Krishna and threatens to kill him. But suddenly a twist occurs, where it shows Vinod is one of their men. Durga kills Scaria and reveals to Vinod that he already knew that Vinod had links with the terrorists and revealed it to his mother. His mother gave permission to kill Vinod. Durga drowns Yasir to death and kills Vinod with his gun. He felt very emotional and mournful in killing his own brother. Durga is honoured by the entire state for his bravery and actions, after he puts an end to the terrorist rampage in Kerala.

== Cast ==
- Suresh Gopi as IG Durga Prasad IPS, the Chief of ATS-Kerala
- Govind Padmasoorya as Vinod Krishna, Durga's brother
- Nandini as Adv. Yamini
- Anaitha Nair as Chandini, Vinod's love interest
- Lakshmi as Durga's and Vinod's mother
- Ashish Vidyarthi as Scaria Zachariah
- Rajan P. Dev as Chief Minister Ramachandran
- Siddique as SSP Saheer Ahmed IPS, ATS - operations wing chief (extended cameo)
- Vijayaraghavan as DYSP George Varghese (Vakkachan), ATS Officer
- Kiran Raj as DCP Diwakar IPS, ATS Officer
- Devan as DGP Varghese Daniel IPS, State Police Chief
- Jagathy Sreekumar as SI Damodaran Pillai, ATS Officer
- Sai Kumar as Beerankutty Sahib, Chandini's father and ex-minister
- John Kokken as Yasir Shah
- Santhosh as DGP Yoonus Muhammed IPS, State Intelligence Wing Chief
- Ambika Mohan as Chandini's mother
- Subair as City Police Commissioner Vijayabhaskar IPS
- V. K. Sreeraman as Paul Joseph IAS, Home Secretary
- Reshmi Boban as Paul Joseph's wife
- Sivaji Guruvayoor as Dineshan, Party Secretary
- Biju Pappan as Mujeeb

== Reception ==
Paresh C Palicha from Rediff.com wrote "To sum up, IG is just an average Suresh Gopi fare". Sify.com wrote that " Govind Padmasurya definitely has a future in Malayalam film, while other characters like Jagathy and Vijayraghavan disappear halfway through. Is the role of Nandini as a smart lawyer necessary? At most the film is a time pass entertainer which is racy and briskly told though the story and situations are all ?old wine in new bottle?."
