= K. P. A. C. Leela =

Indian actress

K.P.A.C. Leela
- Born: Leela; Pampakuda, Ernakulam, Kerala, India
- Occupation: Actress
- Years active: 1962–present
- Spouse: David

K. P. A. C. Leela is an Indian actress best known for her work in Malayalam theater and films. She has received the Guru Pooja Award of Kerala Sangeetha Nataka Academy. The Kerala State Film Awards 2018 jury gave a special mention for her performance in the film Roudram 2018.

== Early life and career ==
Leela was born in Pampakuda, a village between Muvattupuzha and Piravom. Both her parents, Kuriakos and Mariamma, were committed communists. She joined Kerala Kalamandalam to study dance for a while. She first played the role of the heroine Tresa in the drama Munthiricharil Kure Kannuneer. Later, she worked at KPAC for fifteen years, playing lead roles in many of Bhasi's plays. She made her acting debut in the movie 'Puthiya Aakaasham Puthiya Bhoomi.' Other films she appeared in include 'Mudinaya Putra,' 'Ammaye Vanthana,' and 'Adhyapika.' She concluded her acting career in the 1970s.

Leela made her comeback with the film Oru Pennum Randaanum, portraying the character of Maria. Following that, she portrayed the role of Marykutty in Roudram 2018. The film, released in 2019, depicted the real story of the floods that Kerala faced in 2018. In 2023, she portrayed the character Leela in Pookkaalam.

== Personal life ==
She was married to David, an instrumentalist at KPAC.

== Filmography ==
=== Films ===
==== As actor ====
Year	Title	Role	Notes
1962	Puthiya Aakaasham Puthiya Bhoomi		
1963	Ammaye Kaanaan	Leela	
2009	Oru Pennum Randaanum	Maria	
2019	Roudram 2018	Marykutty	
2023	Pookkaalam	Kochu Thressiamma	
2023	Cheena Trophy	Powlin	
2023	Divorce		
2025	Lovely		
2025	Bhoothayanam	Mary	Short film
2026	Poovu	Jeevan's mother	
2026	Muthassi	Muthassi	ZEE5 series
2026	Granny	Granny	Short film

==== As dubbing artist ====
- Eko (2025) for Biana Momin

=== Television ===
- Mudianaya Putrani
- Puthiya Aakaasham Puthiya Bhoomi
- Ashwamedham
- Sharashaiya

== Awards ==
She has received the Guru Pooja Award of Kerala Sangeetha Nataka Academy. She also wins best actress award for her role in Roudram 2018.

Year	Awards	Result
2018	Kerala Sangeetha Nataka Academy	Won
2019	Best Actress Award - Roudram 2018	Won
