= Gokul Ramakrishnan =

Indian film director

- Born: Palakkad
- Occupations: Film director; Scriptwriter
- Years active: 2015–present

Gokul Ramakrishnan is an Indian film director and script writer who works in the Malayalam film industry.

== Film career ==
He made his directional debut 32aam adhyayam 23aam vaakyam (2015), directed along with Arjun Prabhakaran. 32aam adhyayam 23aam vaakyam is starring Govind Padmasoorya, Lal, and Miya. In 2019 Second directoral film Shibu released starring Karthik Ramakrishnan, Salim Kumar and Anju Kurian.

His third film Bannerghatta (2021) which was released directly on Amazon prime video received widespread critical attention. It was an official selection in 26th International Film festival of Kerala IFFK.

In 2023 Thaaram Theertha Koodaram released starring Karthik Ramakrishnan and Nainitha Mariya and written by Arjun Prabhakaran.

== Filmography ==
Year	Film	Writer	Director	Notes	Ref
2015	32aam adhyayam 23aam vaakyam	Yes	Yes	Debut Movie	
2019	Shibu	Yes	Yes		
2021	Bannerghatta	Yes	No		
2023	Thaaram Theertha Koodaram	Yes	Yes		
