= Annu Antony =

Indian actress

- Born: 24 January 1996 (age 30)
- Occupation: Actress
- Years active: 2016–present

Annu Antony is an Indian actress who works in Malayalam films. She made her feature film debut through a lead role in the coming of age film Aanandam (2016).

== Filmography ==
Key
†	Denotes film or TV productions that have not yet been released

=== Films ===
- All films are in Malayalam language.

Year	Title	Role	Notes	Ref.
2016	Aanandam	Devika		
2022	Hridayam	Maya Padmanabhan		
2023	Pookkaalam	Elsi		
2023	Made in Caravan	Thara		
2024	Swakaryam Sambhava Bahulam	Ancy		
2025	Private	Kamala		

=== Webseries ===
Year	Series	Role	Notes	Ref.
2023	Priyapettavan Piyush	Mini	Karikku series	
