= Anu Elizabeth Jose =

Indian lyricist

- Born: Ernakulam, India
- Occupation: Lyricist
- Writing career
- Years active: 2012–present
- Subject: Malayalam
- Notable works: Muthuchippi Poloru, Thattathin Marayathu
- Website: facebook.com/anu.e.jose

Anu Elizabeth Jose is an Indian lyricist. She made her debut in the 2012 Malayalam film Thattathin Marayathu through the song "Muthuchippi Poloru".

== Early life ==
In 2015 she wrote lyrics for the film 32aam Adhyayam 23aam Vaakyam, music composed by Bijibal.

== Awards and nominations ==
Year	Status	Title	Category	Film
2012	Won	International Malayalam Film Awards	Best Lyricist	Thattathin Marayathu
2013	Won	Mollywood Nakshathra	Favourite Lyricist	Thattathin Marayathu
2013	Won	Eenam Swaralaya	Best lyricist	Thattathin Marayathu
2013	Won	SIIMA Award	Best Lyricist	Thattathin Marayathu
2013	Won	Mirchi Music Awards South	Best Lyricist	Thattathin Marayathu
2013	Won	Jaycey Foundation Film Awards	Best Lyricist	Thira

== Selected filmography ==
Song	Movie	Year	Musician
Muthuchippi Poloru	Thattathin marayathu	2012	Shaan Rahman
Shyaamambaram	Thattathin marayathu	2012	Shaan Rahman
Thattathin marayathe penne	Thattathin marayathu	2012	Shaan Rahman
Kannadichillil minnum	Natholi oru cheriya meenalla	2013	Abhijith shylanath
Hey ithuvazhi	Arikil oral	2013	Gopi sundar
Chempaneer chundil	Natholi oru cheriya meenalla	2013	Abhijith shylanath
Doore doore	Natholi oru cheriya meenalla	2013	Abhijith shylanath
Kanmani kanmani	Natholi oru cheriya meenalla	2013	Abhjith shylanath
Nalangal anayumoree	Natholi oru cheriya Meenalla	2013	Abhjith shylanath
Ithen swapnamo	Aaru sundarimarude kadha	2013	Deepak dev
Ask me	Aaru sundarimarude kadha	2013	Deepak dev
Neeyo	Honey bee	2013	Deepak dev
Rakshaka née kandathillen	Kadal kadannoru mathukutty	2013	shahabaz aman
Vinnile tharakam	Philips an the monkey pen	2013	Rahul subramanyan
Its just another day	Philips and the monkey pen	2013	Rahul subramanyan
Theerathe neelunne	Thira	2013	Shaan Rahman
Thazhvaram	Thira	2013	Shaan Rahman
Thaazhe née thaarame	Thira	2013	Shaan Rahman
Vaya moodu mindathe	Samsaram arogyathinu hanikaram	2014	sean rolden
Kaana kanneerilay	Samsaram arogyathinu hanikaram	2014	Sean rolden
Swaathanthryathin thaalangal	Samsaram arogyathinu hanikaram	2014	Sean rolden
Neerpalunkin nanavu melle	Vegam	2014	govind menon
Mannil pathiyumee	Gods own country	2017	gopi sundar
Idi minnal chalanangal	The last supper	2014	gopi sundar
Parvana vidhuve	Oru Vadakkan Selfie	2015	Shaan Rahman
Omal kanmani	32aam adhyayam 23aam vaakyam	2015	Bijibal
Pathiye novaay	32aam adhyayam 23aam vaakyam	2015	Bijibal
Neeyen Kaataai	Jo and the boy	2015	Rahul Subrahmanian
Nilaavil Ellaame	Aanandam	2016	Sachin Warrier
Payye veeshum kaattil	Aanandam	2016	Sachin Warrier
Olangal moodum	Gemini	2017	Shaan Rahman
Uyarum Manjalayil	June (2019 film)	2019	Ifthi
