= Swakaryam Sambhava Bahulam =

- Theatrical release poster
- Directed by: Naseer Badarudeen
- Produced by: Naseer Badarudeen
- Starring: Jeo Baby; Annu Antony; Sajin Cherukayil
- Release date: 31 May 2024
- Country: India
- Language: Malayalam

Swakaryam Sambhava Bahulam is a 2024 Malayalam-language thriller film written and directed by Naseer Badarudeen. The film stars Jeo Baby, Annu Antony, Shelly Kishore, Sajin Cherukayil, Akhil Kavalayoor and Sudheer Paravoor. It was released on 31 May 2024.

== Plot ==
The film revolves around Ravi, a middle-aged man who works as a security guard at a mental asylum. He has two daughters, where one of them Ancy is married to Pushparajan. One day, Pushparajan mysteriously disappears. Ravi is initially reluctant to get involved, but he eventually starts to investigate. As he digs deeper, he uncovers a web of secrets and lies that threatens to tear his family apart.

== Cast ==
- Jeo Baby as Ravi
- Annu Antony as Ancy, Ravi's elder daughter
- Sajin Cherukayil as Pushparajan, Ancy's husband
- Shelly Kishore as Ambili, Ravi's girlfriend
- Akhil Kavalayoor as Raveendran, Ravi's younger brother
- Sudheer Paravoor as Rajan, Ravi's friend
- Amith Mohan Rajeshwari as Vinod, Ravi's colleague and friend
- Arunsol as ASI Shaji

== Production ==
The film was produced by Naseer Badarudeen under the banner of N Tales Studio. The music was composed by Sidhartha Pradeep. The music rights is owned by Saregama.

== Release ==
Swakaryam Sambhava Bahulam was released in theaters on 31 May 2024. The film received mixed reviews from critics. Some praised the performances and the suspenseful plot, while others criticized the film's slow pace and lack of originality.
