= Govind Padmasoorya =

Indian actor and YouTuber

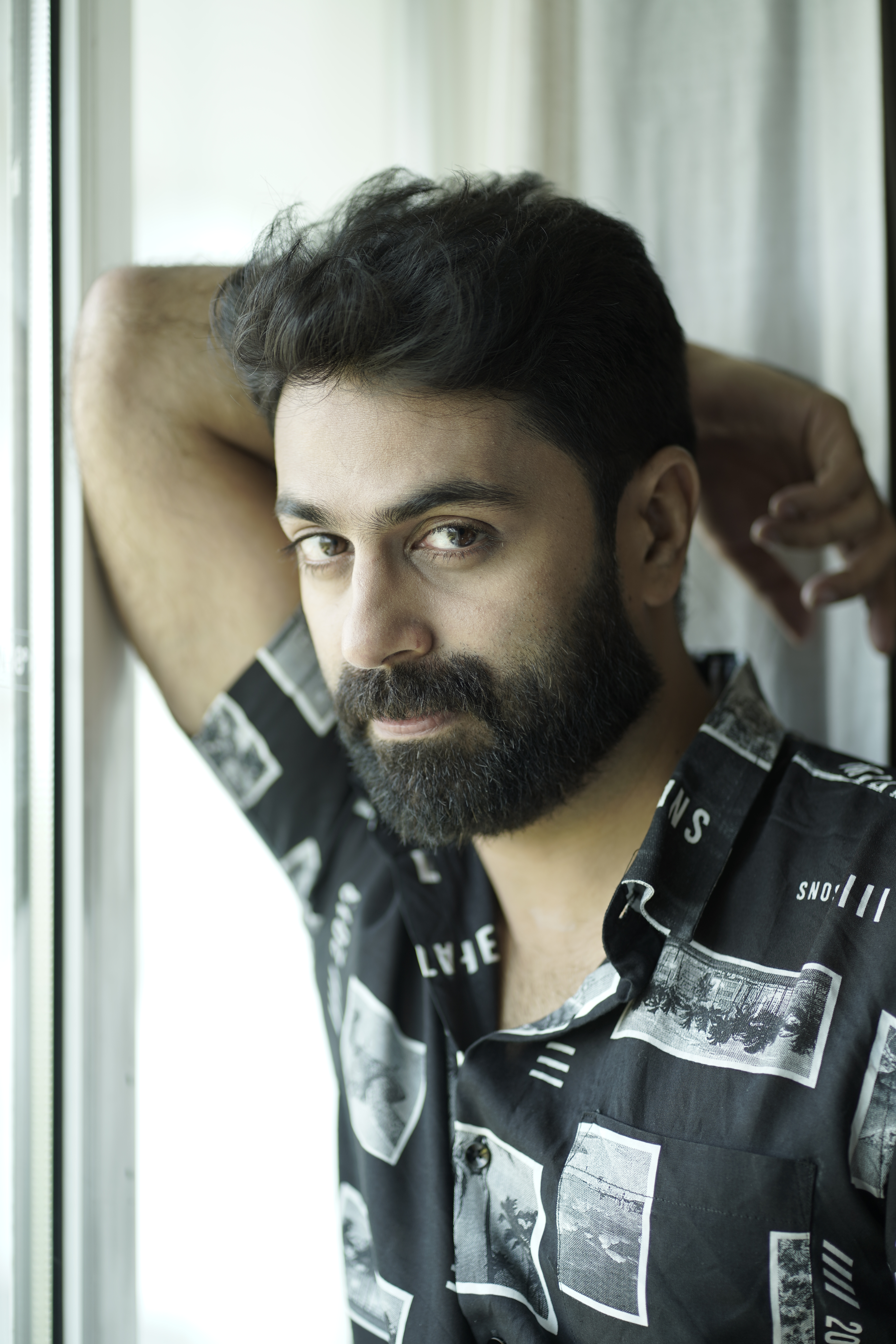
- Born: 16 June 1987 (age 39); Pattambi, Palakkad district, Kerala
- Other names: GP, Padma
- Occupations: Actor; television presenter; VJ; singer; YouTuber; film Maker
- Years active: 2008–present
- Spouse: Gopika Anil (m. 2024)

YouTube information
- Channel: Govind Padmasoorya
- Years active: 2020-present
- Genres: Lifestyle; Travel Vlog; Motivation; Music
- Subscribers: 655,000
- Views: 173 million
- Last updated: 13 June 2026
- Website: padmasoorya.com

Govind Padmasoorya (born 16 June 1987), popularly known by his initials GP, is an Indian actor and television presenter who works mainly in Malayalam cinema and Telugu films. He made his debut in the movie Atayalangal directed by M. G. Sasi which won 5 Kerala State awards including Best Film.

He became popular through the dance reality show D 4 Dance. He directed a promo film for Malayalam television channel Asianet for their 25 years celebration. He marked his Telugu debut in the film Ala Vaikunthapurramuloo directed by Trivikram Srinivas starring Allu Arjun.

== Early life ==
Govind Padmasoorya was born at Pattambi in the Palakkad district of Kerala to Govind Menon and Malathy. He has a younger brother named Govind Amrithsoorya. After schooling, he did his B.A. at St. Aloysius College, Mangaluru, where he served as arts secretary. He then earned an MBA in Media and Entertainment from Manipal University.

On 22 October 2023, he got engaged to Malayalam television actress Gopika Anil. They got married on 28 January 2024.

== Career ==
He made his debut in Malayalam cinema in 2008 as the protagonist in Atayalangal, directed by M. G. Sasi and produced by Aravind Venugopal. The film was based on the life and literature of the writer Nandanar. Next, GP portrayed the role of Vinu, the brother of the IG (Suresh Gopi) in B. Unnikrishnan's IG, who transforms from a loving brother to a ruthless terrorist towards the end of the movie. He was also cast as Sreekanth, an Indian cricketer, in Daddy Cool. Then on he did lead roles in many films including 32aam Adhyayam 23aam Vaakyam along with Lal & Miya directed by Arjun Prabhakaran and Gokul Ramakrishnan. He marked his Tamil debut in the film Kee directed by Kalees starring Jiiva. He marked his Telugu debut in the film Ala Vaikunthapurramuloo directed by Trivikram Srinivas starring Allu Arjun.

== Filmography ==
Key
†	Denotes films that have not yet been released

Year	Title	Role	Notes
2008	Atayalangal	Padathuparambil Gopinathan	
2009	Daddy Cool	Sreekanth	
2009	Bhoomi Malayalam	Satheeshan	
2009	IG	Vinod Krishna	
2010	College Days	Joe	
2013	Natholi Oru Cheriya Meenalla	Moby	
2013	72 Model	V. Sajan	
2014	Ettekaal Second	Sandeep S Nair (Sandu)	
2014	Varsham	Dr.Prakashan	
2015	Lavender	Kabir Abbas	
2015	32aam Adhyayam 23aam Vaakyam	Freddy Abraham	
2016	Pretham	Shibu Majeed	
2018	Pretham 2	Shibu Majeed	Cameo appearance
2019	Kee	Shiva	Tamil film
2020	Ala Vaikunthapurramuloo	Paidithalli	Telugu film
2022	Bangarraju	Aadhi Sampath	Telugu film
2022	Like, Share & Subscribe	Police Officer	Telugu film
2022	Meet Cute	Ajay	SonyLIV Telugu series
2022	Shefeekkinte Santhosham	Shejeer	
2023	Neeraja	Alex	
2024	Manorajyam	Manu Keraleeyan	

== Television ==
TV shows

Year	Programme	Role	Network
2014	D 4 Dance	Co-Host with Jewel Mary	Mazhavil Manorama
2015	Gum on D2	Co-Host with Pearle Maaney	Mazhavil Manorama
2015	Thengakola Mangatholi	Himself	Mazhavil Manorama
2015–2016	Adi Mone Buzzer:Fastest Family First	Host	Asianet
2016	Asianet Film Awards 2016	Host with Meera, Gayathri Suresh	Asianet
2016	Singapore Onam	Host / Performer	Asianet
2017	Asianet Film Awards 2017	Host with Meera Nandan	Asianet
2017-2018	Dare The Fear: Aarkunde ee Chankoottam?	Host	Asianet
2017-2018	Dare The Fear: Extra time	Host	Asianet
2019	21st Asianet Film Awards	Host with Nyla Usha	Asianet
2019	D 5 Junior	Special Judge	Mazhavil Manorama
2019-2020	Anantharam	Host	Flowers TV
2020-2021	Mr.&.Mrs	Judge	Zee Keralam
2021	Star Magic	Mentor	Flowers TV
2021–2022	Bzinga	Host	Zee Keralam
2022	10th SIIMA Awards	Host with Pearle Maaney	Surya TV
2022–2023	Bzinga Family Festival	Host	Zee Keralam
2026	The Great Family Challenge	Host	Mazhavil Manorama

=== Music video ===
Year	Work	Role	Language
2007	Monchulla Painkily	Actor	Malayalam
2007	Vanamallike	Actor	Malayalam
2020	Nirmana	Singer	Malayalam
2020	Aaradhu Song	Singer	Malayalam
2021	Ennum Ennum Nenjoram	Singer	Malayalam
2021	Minnume Kannukal	Singer	Malayalam
2021	Shivoham	Singer/actor	Malayalam; Tamil
2022	Gham Ki Barish	Actor	Hindi
