= Bannerghatta (film) =

2021 movie by Arjun Prabhakaran and Gokul Ramakrishnan

- Movie poster
- Directed by: Vishnu Narayanan
- Written by: Arjun Prabhakaran and Gokul Ramakrishnan
- Produced by: Copyright Pictures
- Starring: Karthik Ramakrishnan
- Cinematography: Binu
- Edited by: Pareekshith
- Music by: Reejo Chakalakkal
- Production company: Copyright Pictures
- Distributed by: Prime Video
- Release dates: 25 July 2021 (Amazon Prime Video); 18 March 2022 (IFFK)
- Country: India
- Language: Malayalam

Bannerghatta is a 2021 Indian Malayalam-language Mystery thriller film directed by debutant director Vishnu Narayanan and written by Arjun Prabhakaran and Gokul Ramakrishnan. The film stars Karthik Ramakrishnan. Movie had a worldwide premier release through Amazon Prime. And it was among Malayalam today official selection at 26th International Film Festival of Kerala (IFFK).

== Premise ==
Ashiq an acting driver - Protagonist of the movie gets a call from his sister, from Bangalore where she went to attend an interview. From the call, Ashiq came to know that she is being chased by a group of persons from the nearby suburbs. Story rolls by the acts of Ashiq to save his sister from those people, being in a distance of 400 km (250 mi) or more.

== Cast ==
- Karthik as Ashiq
- Asha Menon
- Anoop as Police constable
- Sunil as SI
- Vinod as Police constable
- Anoop as Driver

== Production ==
After starring in Shibu, Karthik Ramakrishnan was cast in the film, directed by debutant Vishnu Narayanan, written by Arjun and Gokul. Bannerghatta is actually a place near Bengaluru. Major incident in the film is happening in the surroundings of Bannerghatta National Park.

== Release ==
Bannerghatta was released on Amazon Prime Video on 25 July 2021. In March 2022 the movie was screened at the 26th IFFK.

== Reception ==
=== Critical reception ===
Times of India says "Making a story set in a moving vehicle a compelling watch is hardly easy. Director Vishnu Narayanan's film Banerghatta gets unfurled mostly in its protagonist's journey in the night, as constant phone calls and other interruptions disrupt things for him, The movie might excite those who like to give unconventional story-telling a try". Subash K Jha of Spotboye says "This Kartik Ramakrishnan Starrer Is A Wild Untameable Beast Of A Film" and gave 3 out of 5 stars.
