= Pakarnnattam =

- Directed by: Jayaraj
- Written by: C. P. Udaybhanu
- Screenplay by: C. P. Udaybhanu
- Produced by: Ravi Kottarakkara
- Starring: Jayaram; Sabitha Jayaraj
- Cinematography: Sinu Sidharth
- Edited by: Sobin K Soman
- Music by: Kailas Menon
- Production company: Ganesh Pictures
- Release date: 9 March 2012
- Country: India
- Language: Malayalam

Pakarnnattam is a 2012 Malayalam film directed by Jayaraj, starring Jayaram and Jayaraj's wife Sabitha Jayaraj in the lead roles. The film is based on political violence and fight against the Endosulfan tragedy in Kasargod, Kerala.

== Plot ==
The film explores the practice that makes martyrs of the local political activists who are willing to sacrifice their life for ideologies. The film is also a poignant love story of a Meera (Sabitha Jayaraj) and her relentless fight against her own family and society for the man she love. Meera falls in love with Thomas (Jayaram), who becomes an accused in a political murder and is sent to jail. Although Thomas is innocent, he accepts the verdict against him for his political party. Along with Meera's battle to save Thomas, the film also makes a statement on the tragedy caused by the pesticide Endosulfan, in Kasaragod district. Thomas is an activist who fights for the rights of the victims of Endosulfan.

== Cast ==
- Jayaram as Thomas
- Sabitha Jayaraj as Meera
- Bhasi Thiruvalla as Adv. Kaimal
- Vijay Victor as Sudhi
- Satish Poduval as Raghavan
- Nedumbram Gopi as Meera's father
- Madampu Kunjukuttan as Meera's uncle
- Vijayan Peringode as Meera's uncle
- Eliamma as Thomas's mother

== Accolades ==
- Pakarnnattam was screened in the Malayalam Cinema Today section in the 16th International Film Festival of Kerala (IFFK), 2011.
- Subin K. Soman won the Kerala State Film Award for Best Editor.
