= Sachin Warrier =

Indian singer

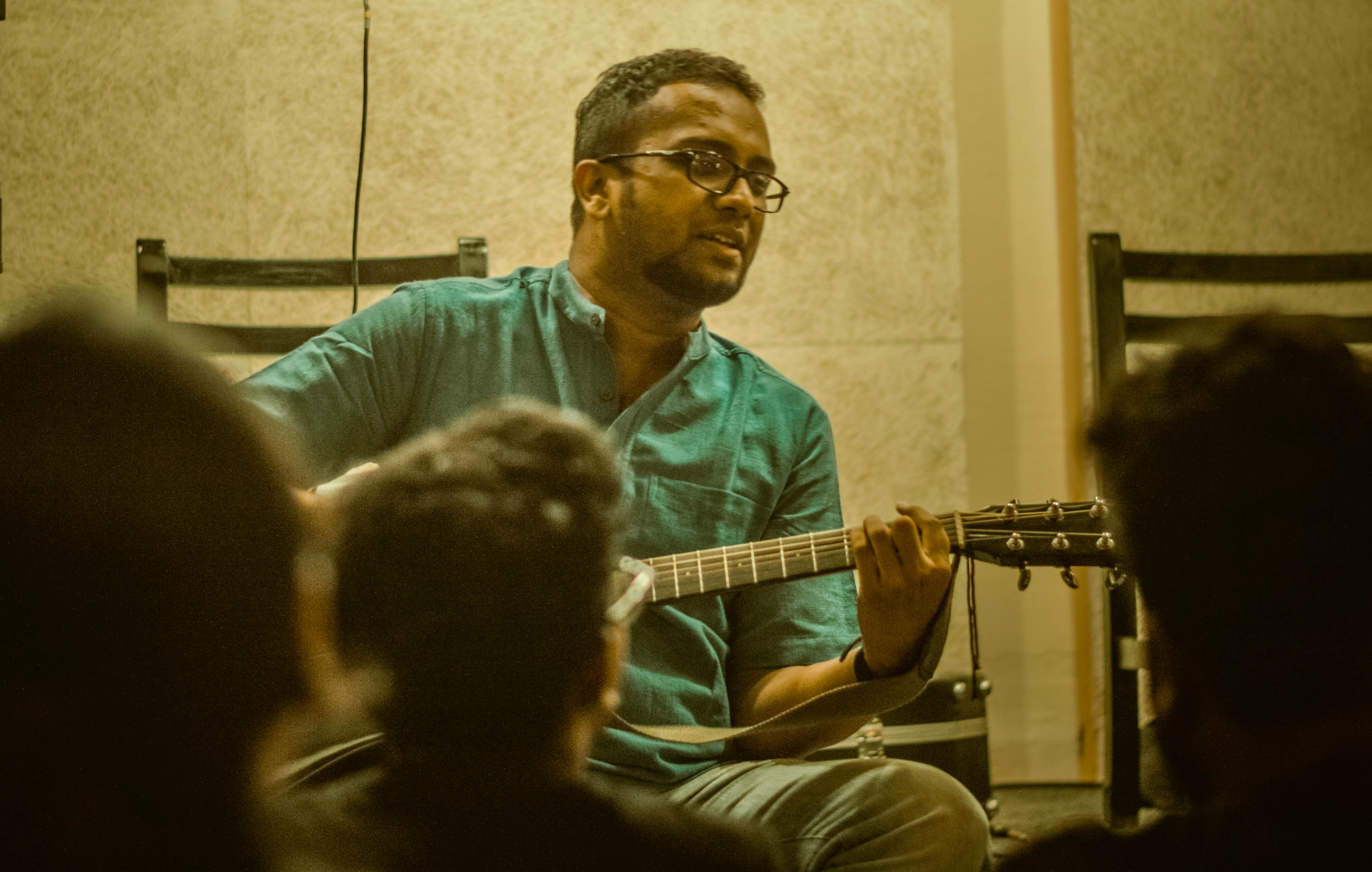
- Born: 15 October 1989 (age 36); Kozhikode, Kerala, India
- Occupations: Singer; composer
- Years active: 2010–present
- Spouse: Pooja
- Website: sachinwarrier.com

Sachin Warrier is an Indian playback singer and composer in the Malayalam film industry from Kerala. He became notable with the song "Muthuchippi Poloru" from the film Thattathin Marayathu. He made his debut with the movie Malarvaadi Arts Club. He was working as a software engineer in Tata Consultancy Services in Kochi. Later he resigned from the job to concentrate more on music. He debuted as a composer with the movie Aanandam.

== Early life ==
Sachin Warrier was born in Kozhikode, and grew up in Kottakkal, in Malappuram district. He finished his engineering at FISAT, Angamaly, Kerala.

== Career ==
Warrier made his debut in playback singing while he was in college, in the year 2010, for the movie Malarvaadi Arts Club. He then joined Tata Consultancy Services and worked for three years, during which period he sang for movies including Thattathin Marayathu, Neram, Left Right Left, Thira, Rasputin, Philips and the Monkey Pen and Bangalore Days. In late 2014, he left his IT job to focus more on music. He also started composing for ads and making music independently around this period. His debut single as an independent musician, called 'Naam' (meaning 'us', in Malayalam) was released in 2015, and premiered in Pepsi MTV Indies channel.

Warrier's first movie as a composer was Aanandam, released in 2016.

== Discography ==
=== As playback singer ===
Year	Film	Songs	Composer
2010	Malarvaadi Arts Club	Aayiram Katham; Maanya Maha Janangale	Shaan Rahman
2011	The Metro	Ee Chakkada Vandi	Shaan Rahman
2012	Thattathin Marayathu	Muthuchippi Poloru; Thattathin Marayathe Penne	Shaan Rahman
2012	Bavuttiyude Namathil	Pakalakannu Doore	Shahabaz Aman
2013	10:30 am Local Call	Etho Sayahna Swapnangalil	Gopi Sunder
2013	Good Bad & Ugly	Pookkaithachendupol	MG Sreekumar
2013	SIM	Kaanaan Njanennum	Gopi Sunder
2013	Neram	Vaathil Melle	Rajesh Murugesan
2013	Left Right Left	Aa Nadioyoram; Mindathe	Gopi Sunder
2013	Thira	Thaazhe Nee Tharame	Shaan Rahman
2013	For Sale	Ente Mizhi	Titus Mathew
2013	Escape from Uganda	Thenalle	Varun Unni
2013	Rasputin	Parayathe	Roby Abraham
2013	Philips and the Monkey Pen	En Kanimalare	Rahul Subrahmaniam
2014	Bangalore Days	Maangalyam	Gopi Sunder
2014	Asha Black	Manjayi Peytha	Jecin George
2014	Happy Journey	Ithu Kaliya	Gopi Sundar
2014	RajadhiRaja	Pattum Chutti	Karthik Raja
2014	Varsham	Kootuthedi	Bijibal
2015	Nellikka	Swapnachirakilonnay	Bijibal
2015	32aam Adhyayam 23aam Vaakyam	Omal Kanmani	Bijibal
2015	Nee-Na	Then Nila	Nikhil J Menon
2015	Nirnnayakam	Venpakal Kili	M. Jayachandran
2015	Baahubali: The Beginning	Theekanal swasamayi	M. M. Keeravani
2015	Jamna Pyari	Jamna Pyari	Gopi Sunder
2015	Bale Bale Magadivoy	Motta Modatisari	Gopi Sunder
2016	Valleem Thetti Pulleem Thetti	Are Thu Chakkarr	Sooraj S. Kurup
2016	Annmariya Kalippilaanu	Thaaramaay	Shaan Rahman
2016	Seethamma Andalu Ramayya Sitralu	Paravasame	Gopi Sunder
2016	Bangalore Naatkal	Thodakkam Mangalyam	Gopi Sunder
2016	Premam	Enno Sarlu	Gopi Sunder
2016	Aanandam	Dooreyo; Nilaavil Ellame	Sachin Warrier
2017	Godha	Kannetha Dooratholam	Shaan Rahman
2017	Prematho Mee Karthik	Okka Chinukulo Enni Andalo	Shaan Rahman
2017	Pokkiri Simon	Pullimane Ninnodoppam	Gopi Sunder
2018	Charminar	Neelashalabhame	Jecin George
2019	Johny Johny Yes Appa	Ente Mathram	Shaan Rahman
2022	Hridayam	Minnalkodi; Bas Kar Ji (poem of Bulleh Shah)	Hesham Abdul Wahab
2023	Padmini (2023 film)	Padminiye	Jakes Bejoy

=== As composer ===
Year	Movie	Language	Director	Comment	Status
2016	Aanandam	Malayalam	Ganesh Raj	Debut as a composer	Released on 21 October 2016
2018	Orayiram Kinakkalal	Malayalam	Pramod Mohan		Released on 7 April 2018
2018	Katheyondu Shuruvagide	Kannada	Senna Hegde		Released on 3 August 2018
2019	Shibu	Malayalam	Arjun Prabhakaran & Gokul Ramakrishnan		Released on 19 July 2019
2023	Pookkaalam	Malayalam	Ganesh Raj		Released on 8 Apr, 2023
2023	Marakkuma Nenjam	Tamil/Telugu	Raako Yogandran		Under [post-production]
