= Sabitha Jayaraj =

Indian costume designer and actress

- Occupations: Costume Designer, actress
- Spouse: Jayaraj

Sabitha Jayaraj is an Indian costume designer and actress, who works in Malayalam cinema.

== Career ==
Sabitha started off her career as a costume designer in the Malayalam film industry in the 90s. She worked as a designer in one Hindi and nine Malayalam feature films, one of which, Kannaki (2001), won her the Kerala State Award for Best Costume Design. Later on she started appearing in small roles in films and took up the lead role in Pakarnnattam opposite Jayaram. In 2017 she appeared in the short film Prakriti, told through the point of view of a photographer, played by herself, who is on a tour of Kuttanad. She played the role of Moly, a compassionate mother in Jayaraj's award-winning movie Ottal.

== Personal life ==
Sabitha Jayaraj is married to filmmaker Jayaraj and has collaborated in several of his works. They have two children together, Dhanu Jayaraj and Keshav Jayaraj.

== Filmography ==
Year	Film	Role	Notes
2008	Gulmohar	Sunila teacher	
2008	Of the People	Sreelakshmi	
2009	Madhya Venal	Yashodha	
2011	The Train	Suhana	
2011	Naayika	Sangeetha	
2012	Pakarnnattam	Meera	
2013	Camel Safari	Suparna Deedi	
2015	Ottaal	Moly	
2017	Prakriti		Short film
2018	Bhayanakam	Anthony's wife	
2019	Roudram 2018	Pennamma	
2021	Backpackers	Lakshmi	
2022	Haasyam	Kathrina	
2023	Kadhikan		
2026	Aval		

=== Producer ===
- The Guard (2001)
