= Innu Muthal =

2021 Malayalam film

- Directed by: Rejishh Midhila
- Written by: Rejishh Midhila
- Produced by: Rejishh Midhila; Mejjo Josseph; Lijo James
- Starring: Siju Wilson
- Cinematography: Eldho Isaac
- Edited by: Jamsheel Ibrahim
- Music by: Mejo Joseph
- Production company: The Great Indian Cinemas
- Release date: 28 March 2021
- Running time: 105 minutes
- Country: India
- Language: Malayalam

Innu Muthal (English: From today onwards) is a 2021 Malayalam fantasy movie directed Rejish Medhilia which stars Siju Wilson. The film directly released on Zee Keralam channel on 28 March 2021. It is also streaming on ZEE5 OTT platform. The film was remade in Tamil as Yaanai Mugathaan.

== Plot ==
Abhinandan, a driver and an ardent devotee of Lord Krishna, works hard to get out of his debt for his family but to no avail. He had borrowed so much money from many people and he says lies to escape from the people whom he borrowed money. However, his life changes for the good when a stranger pays him a visit.

== Cast ==
- Siju Wilson as T. Abhinandhan
- Suraj Pops as Lord Krishna
- Smrithi Sugathan as Ala
- Gokulan as Eldhoppi
- Uday Chandra as Gulam Rana Muhammed
- Kottayam Ramesh as Davis
- Indrans as Maniyappan
- Navas Vallikunnu as Chrekkalam Swami

== Reception ==
A critic from The Times of India wrote that "Watch this movie to put a smile on your face and a nice feeling in your heart". A critic from The New Indian Express wrote that "The strength of its message also elevates it, irrespective of its simplicity and familiarity. Innu Mudhal makes you feel good without overdoing it".
