= Aanandam =

2016 Indian film

- Official poster
- Directed by: Ganesh Raj
- Written by: Ganesh Raj
- Produced by: Vineeth Sreenivasan
- Starring: Thomas Mathew; Arun Kurian; Vishak Nair; Roshan Mathew; Siddhi Mahajankatti; Annu Antony; Anarkali Marikar
- Cinematography: Anend C. Chandran
- Edited by: Abhinav Sunder Nayak
- Music by: Sachin Warrier
- Production companies: Habit of Life; Caste N' Crew
- Distributed by: LJ Films
- Release date: 21 October 2016
- Running time: 120 minutes
- Country: India
- Language: Malayalam
- Budget: ₹4 crore
- Box office: est. ₹15 crore

Aanandam (English: Joy) is a 2016 Indian Malayalam-language coming of age comedy film written and directed by Ganesh Raj in his directorial debut. Cinematography was by Anend C. Chandran. Vineeth Sreenivasan produced the film under the banner Habit of Life in association with Vinod Shornur under Cast N' Crew. Aanandam follows the life of seven sophomore engineering students as they embark on their first college tour.

The film features Thomas Mathew, Arun Kurian, Siddhi Mahajankatti, Roshan Mathew, Annu Antony Vishak Nair and Anarkali Marikar, in the lead roles. Shooting locations were at Goa, Hampi, Kochi, Mysore, and at Amal Jyothi College of Engineering. It was released on October 21 and received positive reviews. This movie was subsequently dubbed into Telugu under the same title in 2018 by Sukhibava movies.

== Plot ==
The story revolves around a group of seven friends who embark on their first IV tour (Industrial Visit) of their college life and how it affects small to large changes in their mellow lives. "Rockstar" Gautham, Kuppi(Unnikrishnan), Devika (aka Devooty), Diya, Darshana, Varun and Akshay, along with a group of 33 classmates and two faculty members (Chacko Sir and Lovely Miss) travel to Hampi via Mysuru and then to Goa for the New Year's Eve. Varun organizes the trip as he's recommended by the whole class.

Gautham and Devika are the lovebirds of the group, with Gautham's talent in western music being the spark kindling the relationship. While Gautham is no longer interested in western music and wish to pursue Hindustani classical music; he is forced to mask that part of his identity from Devika for the fear of how her reaction will be. Diya with her lovely nature had been the fascination of Akshay's dreams for a long time, which is known to everyone, except her. The lively nature of Diya had attracted many others in the past (including Varun, known only to Kuppi), who obviously confess their feelings only to get turned down as she never adds a different colour to her friendships. Akshay, being apprehensive, never wishes to do the same and hopes that she likes him on her own terms. He never even talks to her and his friends recommend that he can never pray for a better chance than their first year IV. Akshay is also hunted by many fears including fear of water, fear of heights, among others; but the worst one being his fear of future, as he is often being compared with his successful elder brother, Akash, who set the standards too high. Varun had earlier confessed his feelings to Diya, who rejected the proposal hoping to remain friends. With a feeling of insult, he couldn't do that anymore, leading him to his familiar trait of anger and distant nature. He even remains hostile to another classmate who has a crush on him. The girl, on various occasions, tries to approach him, but each time he dispassionately avoids her. In spite of his cold attitude, he is respected among his friends and classmates alike for his discipline and efficiency. He is often too detached from the group carrying on with his responsibilities, that it comes to the notice of even their bus driver, Josettan. Diya, whose parents just got divorced joins the trip as an escape from her distress. She doesn't reveal about the divorce to her dear friends – Devika and Darshana or any others for the fear of their sympathy, which can make the situation even more difficult on her. She easily manages to hide her secrets in her cheerful semblance. Kuppi's only intention coming for the IV was to have a good time with his three best friends, which is often denied due to the occurrences around him. Darshana, a reserved person by nature, thinks the world of her friends, being a silent partner in all their activities and a curious observer to all the happenings around them. Her only outlet of emotions is her sketchbook that she holds dear and private.

During the trip, Diya succeeds in talking to Varun. She resolves their differences to slowly gain back her old friend. Akshay's friends manage to seat Diya near him during the overnight journey to Goa, whereby Akshay finally gets a chance to privately talk to her. They converse through the night, where Diya grows fond of someone for the first time. With a little nudge from her friends, Diya starts to reciprocate Akshay's feelings. Coming to know of Akshay's irrational fears, Diya gets him to face his fears, starting with the adventure sport of bungee jumping. With his first fear conquered, he does the same with his next by finally confessing his feelings to Diya, which she welcomes.

Diya opens up about her parents' divorce to Akshay, which he accidentally reveals to Gautham and through him to Devika, who openly consoles Diya revealing the secret to the whole group. At the same time, Kuppi in a state of intoxication reveals every other secrets about the group – Diya's relation with Akshay, Varun's proposal and Gautham's fear, to everyone else. Offended, Diya retreats to her room. Coming back to his senses, Kuppi realizes how bad his act was. On the next day (also the last day of the trip), Kuppi apologizes to his best friends revealing how tough it was for him to be denied their presence and they reconcile. Gautham reveals his interests to Devika, who gradually accepts and share in his likes. Meanwhile, Varun learns that their expensive tickets to the New Year's party are fake. To his surprise, no one blames him and the group now has a huge task to search for another party.

Diya still stays away from the group, mainly because she can't come to grips with her mother leaving her father. She doesn't talk to anyone including Akshay, much to the dismay of the group. During the search for a party, Akshay runs into his "ideal" brother, Akash, partying in Goa. Although astonished at the find, they share a talk, whereby Akshay no longer fears for his future. With his brother's help he finds an Origami themed party for the night (as Diya likes them). On Akshay's initiative, his professor instigates a talk between Diya's father and Diya, over the phone. Her father reveals the facts behind the divorce and she gets told that the divorce is not that difficult on him, as she imagines it to be. With a feeling of relief despite being sad, she finally rejoins the group for the party. During the party, Darshana shows Diya her sketchbook, which reveals how Akshay and Diya filled her thoughts of late and how happy she was, when she was with him. Diya confesses her feelings to Akshay, rekindling their relationship. Also, Varun apologizes to Diya for his prolonged unfriendly behaviour. He then joins the group for the first time, to celebrate the New Year after Josettan tells him "you can never find time for happiness if you wait for your responsibilities to end, as time slips through your fingers before you even know it."

Back in college, the 'changed' Akshay and Diya are now a couple. Varun is more friendly and content. Kuppi pursues a photography initiative with his new girlfriend Cathy, whom he met whilst on the trip. Devika developed a liking for Indian music, like Gautham and he, on the other hand, overcame his fear of needles to get a couples tattoo with Devika. Darshana is more open about her drawings to her intimate friends.

== Cast ==
- Thomas Mathew as Akshay Raj
- Arun Kurian as Varun Manjooran
- Roshan Mathew as Gautham Roy / Rockstar Gautham
- Vishak Nair as K. Unnikrishnan Pillai/Kuppi
- Siddhi Mahajankatti as Diya
- Annu Antony as Devika / Devooty
- Anarkali Marikar as Darshana Maliakal (also the narrator)
- Rony David as Chacko Sir
- Vinitha Koshy as Lovely Miss
- Rajesh Sharma as Josettan (Bus Driver)
- Serah Mathews as Cathy
- Dhiru Mahajankatti as Boban Sir (HOD)
- Kottayam Pradeep as Professor Kanjikuzhi
- Reshma Nair as Tara
- Megha Mathew as Shwetha
- Nivin Pauly as Akash, Akshay's brother (Cameo)
- Renji Panicker as Diya's father (Cameo)
- Mohanlal as Jagannathan (screen presence from the film "Aaraam Thampuran")

== Music ==
Aanandam

Soundtrack album by Sachin Warrier
- Released: 17 September 2016
- Recorded: 2016
- Genre: Feature film soundtrack
- Length: 18:02
- Label: Satyam Audios

Songs were composed by Sachin Warrier, which was his debut film as a music director. Lyrics were penned by Vineeth Sreenivasan, Manu Manjith, Sachin Warrier and Anu Elizabeth Jose.

All lyrics are written by Manu Manjith.

Malayalam Track listing
| No. | Title | Lyrics | Singer(s) | Length |
|---|---|---|---|---|
| 1. | "Oru Naattil" | Manu Manjith | Vineeth Sreenivasan, Apoorva Bose | 2:48 |
| 2. | "Dooreyo" | Vineeth Sreenivasan | Vishak Nair, Suchith Suresan, Ashwin Gopakumar, Sachin Warrier | 4:10 |
| 3. | "Khule Rasthon Pe" | Sachin Warrier | Raghu Dixit | 2:26 |
| 4. | "Payye Veeshum Kattil" | Anu Elizabeth Jose | Ashwin Gopakumar, Sneha Warrier | 4:39 |
| 5. | "Nilaavil Ellaame" | Anu Elizabeth Jose | Sachin Warrier | 3:23 |
| 6. | "Rathivilaasam" | | Vineeth Sreenivasan | 01:16 |
| Total length: | | | | 18:02 |

Telugu Track listing
| No. | Title | Lyrics | Singer(s) | Length |
|---|---|---|---|---|
| 1. | "Anaganaga" | Vanamali | Krishna Chaitanya | 2:36 |
| 2. | "Nammelaga Lede" | Vanamali | Krishna Chaitanya, Manisha | 4:16 |
| 3. | "Evvala Kannullo" | Vanamali | Hymath | 2:46 |
| 4. | "Ee Prayanamlo" | Vanamali | Hymath, Manisha | 4:10 |
| Total length: | | | | 13:48 |

== Box office ==
The film was a commercial success, grossing ₹ 15 crore against a budget of ₹ 4 crore. The Telugu dubbed version also performed well.

== Overseas ==
The overseas distribution rights of the film Aanandham are handled by Josemon Simon.

== Reception ==
=== Critical reception ===
Deepa Soman of Times of India rated the film 3/5 stars and wrote, "The story has an average first half, a salt n pepper second half with some smashing music, interesting-but-expected cameos and moments that make you reminisce your college days."

The Hindu wrote, "After being crisply edited to 2 hours, we have half-an-hour exactly divided for each of the four days, over which the internal bonding and romances within a group of seven play out before us. There is no story, nor a plot here to speak of, rather it progresses over a series of small incidents during the trip. Even the conflict in the end does not appear very serious, which quite goes with the light-hearted treatment."

Litty Simon of Onmanorama rated the film 3.5/5 stars and wrote, "Deliciously shot and superbly narrated, Aanandam will be one of the riveting movie experiences that one can get to see. And for those who are missing college life, this will make you all the more nostalgic. If joy is a deep-seated and enduring affection that endures for long, Aanandam will stay here... deep inside!"

Anna MM Vetticad of Firstpost wrote, "Aanandam got me into a forgiving mood, perhaps because it is such a relief to see a Malayalam film in which when a man loves a woman, he does not harass her (to paraphrase Percy Sledge). In the overall analysis, this is a mildly engaging, mildly sweet, inoffensive film. It does not have staying power in the mindspace, but it is fair enough while it lasts."
