= Aanachandam =

- Directed by: Jayaraj
- Written by: Satheesh-John
- Starring: Jayaram; Remya Nambeesan; Sai Kumar; Innocent; Cochin Haneefa; Salim Kumar; Jagathy Sreekumar
- Music by: Jaison J. Nair
- Release date: 25 August 2006
- Country: India
- Language: Malayalam

Aanachandam is a 2006 Indian Malayalam language film directed by Jayaraj and starring Jayaram, Remya Nambeesan (in her lead role debut), Sai Kumar, Innocent, Cochin Haneefa, Salim Kumar and Jagathy Sreekumar. It was released in 2006. The film was a commercial success and critically acclaimed. It ran for about 100 days in the central Kerala regions of Thrissur, Thripunithura and Ottappalam. It was released along with the movie Classmates during Onam holidays that year.

== Plot ==
Aanachandam is about Krishna Prasad who is crazy about elephants. When he was a ten-year-old, his father had taken him to the village temple to attend a festival. An elephant which ran amok during the festival knocked the boy over, placed its front foot on the lad's chest, but then spared him.

His love for elephants started on that day. He started studying about elephants and their habits. Due to his preoccupation with learning about elephants, his regular education suffers, upsetting his family. He failed in several jobs in which elephants had a role to play. Debts began to mount. It is at this juncture that Gowri and her mother come to stay with him. He gives them shelter.

Anirudhan is the very opposite of what Krishna Prasad is. An owner of seven elephants, he has hardly any love for the animals and uses them only as a means to earn income.

== Cast ==
- Jayaram as Krishna Prasad
- Remya Nambeesan as Gouri
- Sai Kumar as Anirudan
- Innocent as Kochuraman
- Jagathy Sreekumar as Inspector Minnal Shahid Rawther
- Cochin Haneefa as Pulikkathara
- Salim Kumar as Aana Paappan Pappan
- Jagadeesh as Santhosh, Krishna Prasad's brother in law
- KPAC Lalitha as Unniyamma
- Machan Varghese as Blade Vasu
- Ramu as Nandhan
- Balachandran Chullikadu as Madhavan, Krishnaprasad's elder brother
- Madampu Kunjukuttan as Nattu Vaidhyan Chandanakkadan
- Nedumbram Gopi as Chandrappan
- Poornima Anand
- Vijayan Peringode as Nadeshan Muthalalli
- Mangalamkunnu Ganapathy as Mambully Arjunan / Vadakkepaattu Arjunan (Krishna Prasad's elephant)
- Mangalamkunnu Ayyappan as Vadakkethala Balaraman (Anirudhan's elephant)

== Soundtrack ==
The film's soundtrack contains 8 songs, all composed by Jaison J. Nair. Lyrics by Kanesh Punoor and P. C. Aravindan.

#	Title	Singer(s)
1	"Arikil Varoo"	Rakesh Brahmanandan, Nasnin
2	"Dhikidu Dhikidu"	S. P. Balasubrahmanyam, Jayakrishnan
3	"Ganeshaarchana"	Bhavya Lakshmi
4	"Guruvayoor Unnikkannanu"	Madhu Balakrishnan
5	"Shyaamavaaniletho Kanikkonna [F]"	Akhila Anand
6	"Shyaamavaaniletho Kanikkonna [M]"	G. Venugopal
7	"Thakida Thakida"	M. G. Sreekumar
8	"Venalvanikayiln"	V. Devanand
