= Saheba Subramanyam =

- Directed by: Sasikiran Narayana
- Written by: Bobby – Kittu (dialogues)
- Based on: Thattathin Marayathu by Vineeth Sreenivasan
- Produced by: Dr. Nageswara Rao Kolla
- Starring: Dilip Kumar; Priyal Gor
- Cinematography: Saiprakash Ummadisingu
- Edited by: Prawin Pudi
- Music by: Shaan Rahman
- Production company: Indo English Productions
- Release date: 13 December 2014
- Country: India
- Language: Telugu

Saheba Subramanyam is a 2014 Indian Telugu-language romantic drama film directed by Sasikiran Narayana, starring Dilip Kumar and Priyal Gor, marking her Telugu debut. It is a remake of the 2012 Malayalam film Thattathin Marayathu.

== Cast ==
- Dilip Kumar as Subramanyam "Subbu" Sastry
- Priyal Gor as Ayesha
- Rao Ramesh as a police officer
- Raghavendra as Subramanyam's friend
- Purnima
- Nagineedu
- Thagubothu Ramesh
- Kondavalasa

== Production ==
A chance meeting two years prior with actor Dilip Kumar and UK-based doctor for more than 14 years, Dr. Nageswara Rao Kolla, made the latter turn producer for the film.

== Soundtrack ==
Apart from two songs, Shaan Rahman reused the songs from Thattathin Marayathu. The audio launch was held on 21 June 2014 at the Taj Deccan hotel in Hyderabad.

== Reception ==
A critic from The Times of India rated the film 1.5 out of 5 stars, writing, "This movie tests your patience and gets on to your nerves. If you love challenges, accept this. If you shy away from this challenge, you are simply being wise."
