= Telugabbai =

- Directed by: OS Avinash
- Written by: OS Avinash
- Produced by: S Ramakrishna
- Starring: Tanish; Remya; Tashu Kaushik
- Cinematography: Prathap V Kumar
- Music by: Mejo Joseph; S P Eswar (BGM)
- Production company: Vera Film Corporation
- Release date: 9 March 2013
- Country: India
- Language: Telugu

Telugabbai (transl. Telugu boy) is a 2013 Indian Telugu language film written and directed by OS Avinash. The film stars Tanish, Remya and Tashu Kaushik. The story is set between two Telugu families who migrated to Malaysia long ago, says the director. The movie has been shot completely in Malaysia. This was the first Telugu film to be shot completely in Malaysia. Mejo Joseph composed the music of the movie. The film was titled Salamath first.

== Cast ==
- Tanish as Arun
- Remya Nambeeshan as Chandamaama
- Tashu Kaushik as Megha
- Nagababu
- Lohith
- Sona Nair
- Ananyya

== Soundtrack ==
Telugabbai

Soundtrack album by Mejo Joseph
- Released: 2012
- Genre: Feature film soundtrack
- Language: Telugu
- Producer: Mejo Joseph

Mejo Joseph chronology
Telugabbai (2012)	Chennaiyil Oru Naal (2013)

Malayalam music director, Mejo Joseph has scored the music for the film. Legendary music director S. P. Kodandapani's son S. P. Eswar has given the background score. Minmini, who had sung the song "Chinni Chinni Aasa" in "Roja", has sung the songs "Kila Kila Mani" and "Chithramga Undhe" in this film. Ramya Nambeesan has sung the song "Pudamini Mose Puvva".

All lyrics are written by JS. Nivas.

No.	Title	Singer(s)	Length
1.	"Kilakilamani"	Minmini, Baby Haripriya	2:20
2.	"Yella Yella"	Vinod Varma, Pavani Rajesh	3:56
3.	"Na Camera"	Geetha Madhuri, Koushik, Pavani Rajesh	4:38
4.	"Chitranga Unde"	Minmini, Koushik	3:42
5.	"Gundellona"	Mejo Joseph	5:14
6.	"Hai Rama"	Shankar Mahadevan, Pavani Rajesh	4:48
7.	"Pudamini Mose"	Remya Nambeeshan	1:13
8.	"Chitranga Unde Mansa"	Minmini, Koushik	3:53
9.	"Cheliya Cheliya"	Mejo Joseph	5:09
10.	"Churakattilanti"	Anooz, Pavani Rajesh	4:27
