= Shibu (film) =

2019 movie by Arjun Prabhakaran and Gokul Ramakrishnan

- Shibu movie poster
- Directed by: Arjun Prabhakaran & Gokul Ramakrishnan
- Screenplay by: Arjun, Gokul & Praneesh Vijayan
- Produced by: Kaargo Cinemas
- Starring: Karthik Ramakrishnan; Anju Kurian; Lukman Avaran; Salim Kumar; Biju Kuttan
- Cinematography: Shabeer Ahammed
- Edited by: Noufal Abdullah
- Music by: Sachin Warrier
- Production company: Kaargo Cinemas
- Distributed by: UK studios
- Release date: 19 July 2019
- Running time: 122 minutes
- Country: India
- Language: Malayalam

Shibu is a 2019 Indian Malayalam-language film directed by duo directors Arjun Prabhakaran and Gokul Ramakrishnan, written by Praneesh, and produced by Kaargo Cinemas. It features Karthik Ramakrishnan, Anju Kurian, Lukman Avaran, Salim Kumar, and Biju Kuttan in lead roles. Sachin Warrier composed the music for the film. It was released on 19 July 2019. Film is loosely based on a hard-core fan of Actor Dileep.

== Plot ==
Shibu is a young guy from an aspiring small town. He tries hard to achieve his dreams, but gets rejected by all. Then he hears about a film institute and he manages to convince his family to let him join the institute. There, instead of learning about cinema, he gets confused. He quits the film institute and tries to make a zero budget film casting his brother in law as the hero and chooses supporting actors from random people he meets. But the shoot goes wrong and turns into chaos and an actor is accidentally killed by Shibu. Then he desperately tries to cover up the murder. Meanwhile, he meets with a girl named Kalyani in a match-making meet and how their aspirations brings them together forms the rest of the story.

== Cast ==
- Karthik Ramakrishnan as Shibu
- Anju Kurian as Kalyani
- Salim Kumar as Dr. Thomas
- Biju Kuttan as Prahladhan
- Lukman Avaran as Habeeb
- Vinod Kovoor as Producer
- Unni Rajan P Dev as Antappan
- Sneha Sreekumar as Kalyanis friend
- Aiswarya Padmakumar as Suhara
- Rajesh Sharma as Satheesh Kupleri
- Kannan Sagar as Bhuvanan
- Badra as Shibu's Mom
- Kshama Krishnan as Sheeba
- Sharan as Siddique
- Sundarpandiyan as Police Officer
- Kochu Preman as Eastman Narayanan
- Naseer Sankranthi as Kambikaadu
- Vaishnavi Warrior as Sandhya
- Gopika as Suhara's Friend
- Anagha as Kalyani's Friend
- Roslyn as Short film actress
- Shyni Sara as Kalyani's mother
- Janish Jinu as Kuttan
- Ajith as Suhail
- Rajesh Paravoor as Attender
- Pavithran as Police Constable
- Rajesh Panavalli as Marriage Broker

== Production ==
The film has music by Sachin Warrier. Sachin wrote about it, "‘Omal Kanmani’ composed by Bijibal sir from the 2015 movie ‘32aam Adhyayam 23aam Vaakyam’ is a song that's close to heart among the ones I’ve sung so far. The directors of the movie, Arjun and Gokul came to me to narrate a story recently, and I had a lot of fun listening to it. I believe it'll turn out to be an interesting film. Super happy to associate with Arjun and Gokul, as a composer in their second film" said Sachin Warrier. Arun Gopi director of Dileep starer movie Ramaleela released first look poster of the film in April 2019. Actor Dileep released trailer of the film in June 2019.

== Soundtrack ==
Shibu

Soundtrack album by Sachin Warrier
- Released: 19 July 2019
- Recorded: 2019
- Genre: Feature film soundtrack
- Label: Zee Music Company
- Producer: Kaargo Cinemas

Sachin Warrier chronology
Katheyondu Shuruvagide (2018)	Shibu (2019)	Pookkalam (2023)

Official audio
- Shibu on YouTube

Lyrics are written by Manu Manjith and Vinayak Sasikumar, all music is composed by Sachin Warrier and Vignesh Baskaran.

No.	Title	Artist(s)	Length
1.	"Aliyukayayi"	Karthik (singer)	4:21
2.	"Pularum Vare"	K. S. Harisankar	4:00
3.	"Oru Poo Chendu"	Anwar Sadat	3:55
4.	"Swapnalokam"	Rajalakshmi	3:20
5.	"Njan Ara"	Rakz Radiant	3:05

== Release ==
The film was released on 19 July 2019 across 80 screens in Kerala.

=== Critical reception ===
The film received mixed reviews, with 2.5 stars out of 5 from Anandh Vishnu of Samayam, while Deepika Jayaram in Times of India gave it 2 stars out of 5, criticising the story and the actors' performances.
