= Thattathin Marayathu =

- Directed by: Vineeth Sreenivasan
- Written by: Vineeth Sreenivasan
- Produced by: Mukesh; Sreenivasan
- Starring: Nivin Pauly; Isha Talwar; Aju Varghese; Sreenivasan; Manoj K. Jayan
- Cinematography: Jomon T. John
- Edited by: Ranjan Abraham
- Music by: Shaan Rahman
- Production company: Lumiere Film Company
- Distributed by: LJ Films
- Release date: 6 July 2012 (India)
- Running time: 127 minutes
- Country: India
- Language: Malayalam
- Budget: ₹3 crore
- Box office: est. ₹18.9 crore

Thattathin Marayathu (transl. Behind The Veil) is a 2012 Indian Malayalam-language romantic drama film written and directed by Vineeth Sreenivasan. The film stars Nivin Pauly and Isha Talwar, with Aju Varghese, Manoj K. Jayan, Sunny Wayne, Sreeram Ramachandran, Bhagath Manuel, Manikuttan, Sreenivasan, and Niveda Thomas in supporting roles. The film is about a Hindu boy, Vinod, and a Muslim girl, Aisha, and the conflict arising out of this inter-faith relationship.

It has been considered as one of the defining films of the Malayalam New Wave, and has been remade in Telugu as Saheba Subramanyam and Tamil as Meendum Oru Kadhal Kadhai.

== Plot ==
Sometime in the past, a young Hindu nair boy named Vinod, while walking with his friend on the Thalassery pier, sees a Muslim girl. He is immediately drawn to her and prays to make her his wife in the future.

In the present, Vinod is detained by the local police station. A police officer comes to inquire about his arrest from the house of Abdul Khader .The police man continues to tease him and pass inappropriate comments on Abdul Khader's niece .This enrages Vinod, who punches the officer warning him never to trash-talk about 'his Aisha'. The officer proceeds to beat him up, when a sympathetic S.I Premkumar calmly talks to Vinod explaining that he would be more than happy to help Vinod and Aisha unite. SI Premkumar then asks Vinod about his love story. The narrative then moves back to his past.

While attending a friend's wedding, Vinod accidentally collides with Aisha while running along a corridor. She falls down a staircase, and is taken unconscious to a hospital. He goes to the hospital to apologize and is attracted to her. With the help of his close friends Abdu and Mustafa, Vinod tries to win Aisha's heart. In order to get close to her, he enrolls in a university Daffmuttu competition that she too is taking part in. He asks an acquaintance, Najaf, to train him for this. Even though they have a bitter past between them, Najaf agrees to train Vinod.

During the cultural festival, Vinod meets Aisha and gets to know her. After the festival is over, Vinod goes to Aisha's house at night and confesses his feelings. After a few days, Aisha reciprocates his feelings by writing a letter. One night, when he believes that no one is home, he tries to meet her. However he is caught and handed over to police.

The narrative comes back to the present day. With the help of SI Premkumar and his friends Vinod tries to find a way to communicate with Aisha and asks Hamza who is Aisha's tutor and cousin to help him. Hamza, who is in love with Vinod's sister, agrees to help Vinod. Vinod opens a Purdah shop and asks Aisha to inaugurate the shop. She agrees to do so without her parents knowing. During the inauguration, she meets Vinod's parents, who are very much happy with Aisha despite her religion. This is, however, discovered by and she is then put into house-arrest by her father's elder brother, Abdul Khader. An accident in Khader's factory leads to a communal riot resulting in Aisha's father Abdul Rahman being attacked. Due to this, the family decide to move to Trivandrum the very next day. Aisha and Vinod met one final time on a rainy night, with tears mingling with the downpour, as they sorrowfully accepted that her family would not allow them to be together. The next day, Abdul Rahman has a change of heart, because he already seen his first daughter's life get spoiled due to his silence and decides to let Aisha to live with the person she loves.

Aisha calls Vinod but finds that Vinod's phone is switched off and he is nowhere to be seen. Finally, with the help of SI Premkumar, they find him sitting by the pier and Aisha proposes him to marry her. Vinod asks to kiss her which she agrees. This kissing scene narrated with a short sarcastic dialogue from Abdu, ending the film. The scene shifts back to the first scene at the same pier where Vinod prays to God to get that beautiful girl he saw and as he leaves, a woman calls out to the little girl as 'Aisha'.

== Cast ==
- Nivin Pauly as Vinod Nair
- Isha Talwar as Aisha Rahman
- Aju Varghese as Abdu, Vinod's friend
- Sreenivasan as Abdul Rahman, Aisha's father
- Manoj K. Jayan as S.I. Prem Kumar
- Ramu as Abdul Khader, Aisha's uncle
- Aparna Nair as Mehru, Aisha's elder sister
- Ahmed Sidhique as Musthafa, Vinod's friend
- Bhagath Manuel as Hamza, Vinod's friend
- Deepak Parambol as Manoj Menon, the youth communist
- Dinesh Prabhakar as Satheeshan, police constable
- Kottayam Pradeep as Shaju, police constable
- Subeesh Sudhi as Subash, police constable
- Vanitha Krishnachandran as Vinod's mother
- Srinda Arhaan as Sandhya, Vinod's sister
- Nandan Unni as Baiju, Vinod's Jail mate
- Sunny Wayne as Majeed, a member of Smart Boyz Gang
- Sreeram Ramachandran as Nijad, a member of Smart Boyz Gang
- Manikuttan as Najaf, Duffmuttu trainer
- Joju George as Viswan, party leader
- Nivetha Thomas as Fathima (cameo appearance)
- Sushin Shyam as the N.R.I boy (cameo appearance)
- John Kaippallil as Imthiyaz (cameo appearance)

== Production ==
Thattathin Marayathu is Vineeth Sreenivasan's second directorial venture and was produced by Lumiere Film Company, a production house owned by Vineeth's father Sreenivasan, actor Mukesh, and Antony Edakochi. The film began its shooting in April 2012 in Thalassery and Kannur.

Nivin Pauly, Aju Varghese, Bhagath Manuel were cast once again by Vineeth Sreenivasan after their first film, while Isha Talwar was introduced by the cinematographer, Jomon T. John, and was selected. Isha Talwar took a four-month voice training class and went through a course to learn Malayalam to ensure her debut was smooth. Ahmed Siddique was chosen to play a very similar character like the one he played in the film Salt N' Pepper, although the differences are he plays a typical Muslim guy with an impeccable Thalassery accent. Alphonse Puthren cut the trailer of the film.

== Reception ==
=== Critical response ===
Moviebuzz in Sify.com rated the movie "Very Good", saying: "With a cute, simple storyline, which is meant to be enjoyed like of whiff of pure fresh air, the film just keeps you engaged all along, quite effectively." One India.com's Smitha gave a positive review, saying: "If you enjoy reading simple Mills and Boons kind of romantic love stories, you might just like Thattathin Marayathu." Similarly, Indiaglitz.com also mentioned that the film is "advised for all who enjoyed reading Mills and Boons kind of romantic love stories, at some point of your adolescence", rating the movie 6/10. The Times of India rated the movie 3.5 out of 5 stars, saying "Vineeth has crafted his dialogues with a highly laughable sense of humour".

However, Veeyen of Nowrunning.com rated the movie 2.5 out of 5 stars. saying: "Performances of the lead actors often come to the rescue, even as the script holds few surprises." Rediff.com's Malayalam movie reviewer Paresh C Palicha also gave a negative review, rating the movie 2 stars out of 5. "The screenplay does try to be interesting going back and forth in the first half, and even has cheeky humour punctuating the proceedings. But, after a while, it feels as if the story is stuck in 'no man's land', not knowing whether to adopt a serious tone or go with the humorous flow," he said.

=== Box office ===
The film grossed ₹10.52 crore (US$1.1 million) from 67 screens in Kerala in 21 days, earning a distributor's share of ₹4.65 crore (US$500,000) from theatres alone in 3 weeks, which was a record in Malayalam cinema. Thattathin Marayathu created a new city record in Ernakulam where it netted ₹ 62 lakhs from Padma, Sridhar and two multiplexes. A distributor's share of approximately ₹ 34.2 lakhs in three weeks. In Thiruvananthapuram, which has the lowest ticket rates among cities in Kerala, the film has taken a distributor's share of ₹ 19.5 lakhs in 21 days. The film completed 50 days in 28 centres at the Kerala box office. The film collected ₹ 1.66 lakhs in the 1st weekend and ₹ 7.73 lakhs in the 9th weekend (final run) from US box office. The film collected ₹ 16.24 lakhs from 13th weekend (final run) from UK box office. The movie was second biggest grosser of 2012 and collected over ₹18.9 crore at the box office.

== Soundtrack ==
The film's score and soundtrack were composed by Shaan Rahman. The lyrics for the soundtrack album featuring ten tracks in total, were written by Anu Elizabeth Jose, Engandiyur Chandrasekharan, and Vineeth Sreenivasan. The audio soundtrack was published by Mathrubhumi Music on 8 June 2012, at the film's audio release event held at Kochi. Actors Mammootty, Dulquer Salmaan, Kunchacko Boban and Fahadh Faasil and the actors of the film released the audio by handing over the CD to M. V. Shreyas Kumar, the managing director of Mathrubhumi company. The soundtrack album received positive reviews with the song "Muthuchippi". By late July 2012, the song had received more than six lakh hits on YouTube.

== Remakes ==
Thattathin Marayathu was remade into Tamil and Telugu languages. It was first remade in Telugu as Saheba Subramanyam in 2014 starring Priyal Gor and Dileep Kumar. In 2015 a Tamil remake was also made with the title Meendum Oru Kadhal Kadhai by Mithran Jawahar starring Walter Philips and Isha Talwar.

== Accolades ==
Ceremony	Category	Nominee	Result
2nd South Indian International Movie Awards	Best Director	Vineeth Sreenivasan	Nominated
2nd South Indian International Movie Awards	Best Cinematographer	Jomon T. John	Nominated
2nd South Indian International Movie Awards	Best Music Director	Shaan Rahman	Won
2nd South Indian International Movie Awards	Best Lyricist	Anu Elizabeth Jose for "Muthuchippi Poloru"	Won
2nd South Indian International Movie Awards	Best Male Playback Singer	Vineeth Sreenivasan for "Anuragathin"	Nominated
2nd South Indian International Movie Awards	Best Female Debutant	Isha Talwar	Won
15th Asianet Film Awards	Best Cinematographer	Jomon T. John	Won
15th Asianet Film Awards	Best Popular Singer	Ramya Nambeesan	Won
15th Asianet Film Awards	Best Star Couple	Nivin Pauly-Isha Talwar	Won
15th Asianet Film Awards	Multi Faced Talent	Vineeth Sreenivasan	Won
