= Remya Nambessan =

Indian actress (born 1986)

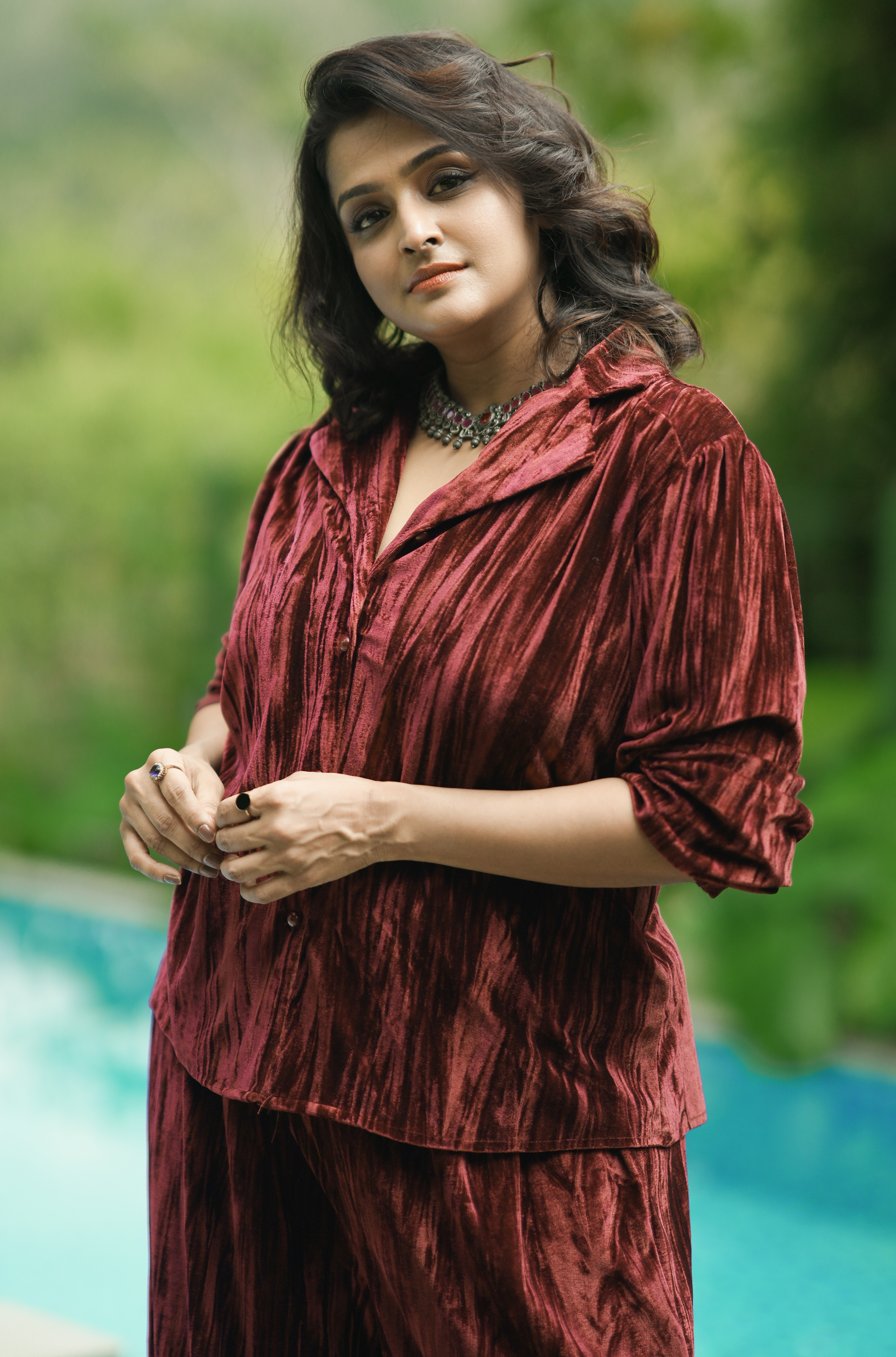
- Nambessan in 2020
- Born: 24 March 1986 (age 40); Chottanikkara, Kerala, India
- Education: St. Teresa's College, Ernakulam, Kerala
- Occupation: Leader of Ammayi Group in Mollywood|Actress|playback singer|
- Years active: 2000–present
- Works: Full list

Remya Nambessan (born 24 March 1986) is an Indian actress, who primarily works in Malayalam and Tamil films. She appears in over 71 films.

== Early life and family ==
Remya Nambessan was born in Chottanikkara, Kochi, Kerala to Subrahmaniam Unni and Jayasree. Her father is a former theatre artiste, who was an active member of troupes such as "Jubilee" and "Harishree". She has a brother, Rahul, who has worked as the music director in the Malayalam movie Philips and the Monkey Pen and as a playback singer in the film Thattathin Marayathu. She attended the Mahatma Gandhi Public School, Ambadimala near Chottanikkara. She graduated with a bachelor's degree in Communicative English from St. Teresa's College, Ernakulam.

== Career ==
Remya started her career with minor supporting roles in the following years in films including Sathyan Anthikad's satire film Narendran Makan Jayakanthan Vaka (2001) and Gramophone (2003).

She played her first lead role, as a bold dance teacher, in the 2006 film Aanachandam.

She was seen in Bachelor Party (2012) and in Ivan Megharoopan (2012), she featured in a cameo appearance. She also signed up for Saji Surendran's comedy film Husbands in Goa (2012). and Oru Yathrayil (2013).

== Other work ==
She was a host before acting. She has sung on devotional albums for Chottanikara Bhagavathi. She has also sung in a few Malayalam films.

== Discography ==
Year	Song	Film	Language	Notes
2012	"Aande Londe"	Ivan Megharoopan	Malayalam	
2012	"Vijana Surabhi"	Bachelor Party	Malayalam	
2012	"Muthuchippi Poloru"	Thattathin Marayathu	Malayalam	
2012	"Pudamini Mose"	Telugabbai	Telugu	
2013	"Pampara Pampara Pa Pa (Shaapp)"	Amen	Malayalam	
2013	"Raavin Cheruvil"	Up & Down: Mukalil Oralundu	Malayalam	
2013	"Maayumee"	English: An Autumn in London	Malayalam	
2013	"Kanavil Kanavil"	Arikil Oraal	Malayalam	
2013	"Fy Fy Fy Kalaachify"	Pandianadu	Tamil	Nominated-SIIMA Award for Best Female Playback Singer
2013	"Balyathil Naam" (Promo Song)	Philips and the Monkey Pen	Malayalam	
2013	"Manjin Kulirin"	Miss Lekha Tharoor Kaanunnathu	Malayalam	
2013	"Mele Vaanile"	Bicycle Thieves	Malayalam	
2014	"Pogathe Pogathe"	Damaal Dumeel	Tamil	
2014	"Ee Mazha Megham"	Om Shanthi Oshaana	Malayalam	
2015	"Adiye Rathiye"	Sagaptham	Tamil	
2015	"Raavin Nizhaloram"	Nellikka	Malayalam	
2015	"Hit-u Song"	Sakalakala Vallavan	Tamil	
2015	"Ullasagayike"	Adi Kapyare Kootamani	Malayalam	
2016	"Maayum Sandhye"	Aakashvani	Malayalam	
2017	"Akkam Pakkam"	Munnodi	Tamil	
2017	"Vaanampaadikal"	Achayans	Malayalam	
2018	"Annana Pathi Kavalailla"	Mannar Vagaiyara	Tamil	
2018	"Carrom Board"	Natpuna Ennanu Theriyuma	Tamil	
2018	"Kadhal Kattu Merandi"	Koothan	Tamil	
2019	"Thiri Thiri"	Dear Comrade	Malayalam	Malayalam dubbed version of Telugu Film Dear Comrade
2020	"Allola Kallolam"	Plan Panni Pannanum	Tamil	
2020	"Oru Venal Kattu"	Oru Nurungu Samsayam (The Little Riddle)	Malayalam	
2020	"Kanmani Anbodu"	Time Up	Tamil	
2021	"Thiruppavai"	Margazhi Thingal	Tamil	music video
2021	"Kadha Padu"	Aanum Pennum	Malayalam	
2021	"Ra Thinkalin"	Home	Malayalam	
2021	"Oo Chollunno Oo Oo Chollunno"	Pushpa: The Rise	Malayalam	Malayalam dubbed version of Telugu Film Pushpa
2022	"Aychakka Aychakka"	My Dear Lisa	Tamil	
2025	"Raave Raave Banganapalli"	Kutram Thavir	Tamil	
