= 32aam Adhyayam 23aam Vaakyam =

2015 movie by Arjun Prabhakaran and Gokul Ramakrishnan

- Film poster
- Directed by: Arjun Prabhakaran; Gokul Ramakrishnan
- Written by: Arjun Prabhakaran; Gokul Ramakrishnan
- Produced by: 7G Cinemas
- Starring: Govind Padmasoorya; Miya; Lal
- Cinematography: Jemin Jom Ayyaneth
- Edited by: Achu Vijayan
- Music by: Bijibal, Sudeep Palanad (background score)
- Release date: 19 June 2015
- Running time: 116 minutes
- Country: India
- Language: Malayalam
- Budget: ₹75 lakh (US$78,000)

32aam Adhyayam 23aam Vaakyam (English: 32nd Chapter 23rd Verse) is a 2015 Indian Malayalam mystery-thriller film, starring Govind Padmasoorya, Miya, and Lal. It was co-written and co-directed by Arjun Prabhakaran and Gokul Ramakrishnan and was released on 19 June 2015.

== Plot ==
The story revolves around a young couple, Charlie Abraham (Govind Padmasoorya) and Ann (Miya), who marry against the wishes of their parents. They are on the verge of celebrating their first wedding anniversary. Ann is a journalist, a dedicated one at that who is adept at digging out the trickiest of mysteries, while Charlie is an engineer returning from America to celebrate their first wedding anniversary. Ann's friend gifts them a book for their wedding anniversary. Charlie starts to read the book as he is fed up of playing games and watching TV as Ann has gone to work. The title of the book is "John Ryan" by Noah. Charlie is interested in the story and finds a similarity with the protagonist of the story. Charlie starts imagining himself in the position of protagonist in the story.

The Protagonist is a digital photographer who photoshoots for actress and models. One day he notices his model is very dull. When asked, she said that she is afraid of the number 23. The number 23 makes her fear for everything and she said that today is her 23rd birthday and also said that she will not live after today. As said, she died the next day. This creates confusion and fear in the mind of the protagonist. He, then explains everything to his wife, Lucia but she doesn't believe this. The next day, he resigns his job because of a fight with the head of the firm and comes back to his home. He, then realised that his wife and the company's head has an affair. Every time when he is not in the house, the head would come to the home. So, the protagonist kills his wife and commits suicide.

== Cast ==
- Govind Padmasoorya as Charlie Abraham/George Ryan
- Miya as Ann Mathews/Lucia
- Lal as Ravi uncle/R.K. Varma
- Arjun Nandhakumar as Kiran
- Sunil Sugatha as Koya
- Sasi Kalinga as Narayanan
- Karthik Ramakrishnan as Antony, College Lecturer
- Gouri as Mia
- Sasha Gopinath as Zara
- P Balachandran as Noah
- Balachandran Chullikadu as Senior Doctor Zachariah Thomas
- Kalabhavan Rahman as Kappyar Isaac
- Vijayan Karanthoor as Police Officer Mathew
- Aashiq (Special appearance)

== Soundtrack ==
32aam Adhyayam 23aam Vaakyam

Soundtrack album by Bijibal
- Released: April 22, 2015
- Genre: Film soundtrack
- Language: Malayalam
- Producer: 7G Cinemas

Bijibal chronology
Vellimoonga (2014)	32aam Adhyayam 23aam Vaakyam (2015)	Maheshinte Prathikaaram (2016)

The film's soundtrack was composed by Bijibal. The lyrics were written by Anu Elizabeth Jose and Santhosh Varma.

Track	Song	Artist(s)	Lyricist
1	"Omal Kanmani"	Sachin Warrier and Sangeetha	Anu Elizabeth Jose
2	"Puthumazha"	Najim Arshad	Anu Elizabeth Jose
3	"Thalavara Kurippu Pusthakam"	Govind Padmasoorya	Santhosh Varma

== Critical reception ==
Times of India stated, "The debutant filmmakers take the audience for a reasonably-wondrous trip into the maze of its story, filled with mystery and revelations. ... The film is a decent watch." Mollywood times stated, "Altogether, 32aam Adhyayam 23aam Vaakyam is a gift that wrapped neatly and skillfully with suspense." Ytalkies stated that the film is "a watchable thriller, fairly well-made ... could have been better if it was a bit faster ... [and had] decent performances". Nowrunning stated, "'32aam Adhyaayam 23aam Vaakyam' fails to shake off the awkwardness and plasticity that makes it a leap to nowhere." Indiaglitz stated, "It lacks something vital, and one feels a forcing of circumstances to give it a mysterious air. This is the movie's undoing, but '32 aam adhyayam 23 aam vakyam' is surely a once time enjoyable watch." Muyals.com rated the movie 3.25 out of 5 and stated, "32aam Adhyayam 23aam Vaakyam stands as a good, as well as unexpected thriller movie; with an above average first half and an unexpected take off to a higher level in the latter half." Chandra Mohan Gopinath of Movie Street stated, "the movie doesn't fall flat but end up as an average one".
