= Arjun Prabhakaran =

Indian film director

- Born: Palakkad
- Occupations: Film director; scriptwriter
- Years active: 2015–present

Arjun Prabhakaran is an Indian film director and script writer who works in the Malayalam cinema.

== Career ==
Arjun's directed 32aam Adhyayam 23aam Vaakyam (2015), and Shibu (2019).

In 2021 he wrote the script for Bannerghatta, which was released on Amazon Prime Video, and was selected at 26th International Film Festival of Kerala as Malayalam official selection. In 2023, he wrote the screenplay for Thaaram Theertha Koodaram.

== Filmography ==
Year	Film	Writer	Director	Notes	Ref
2015	32aam adhyayam 23aam vaakyam	Yes	Yes	Debut Movie	
2019	Shibu	Yes	Yes		
2021	Bannerghatta	Yes	No	OTT release on Amazon Prime Video	
2023	Thaaram Theertha Koodaram	Yes	No		
