= Onnum Onnum Moonu =

Indian television series

- Onnum Onnum Moonu Opening Sequence (Season 1)
- Genre: Talk show
- Created by: MM TV
- Presented by: Rimy Tomy
- Country of origin: India
- Original language: Malayalam
- No. of seasons: 4
- No. of episodes: 273

Production
- Producer: Jenson Zachariah
- Production location: Aroor
- Running time: 45 minutes

Original release
- Network: Mazhavil Manorama
- Release: 7 April 2013 – 29 March 2020

Onnum Onnum Moonu is an Indian celebrity talk show hosted by singer Rimy Tomy on Mazhavil Manorama. The first season of the show began airing on 7 the April 2013 and has completed four seasons.

Onnum Onnum Moonu is all based on a fun-talk show being aired on Mazhavil Manorama. The show opens with a song sung by Tomy, and usually closes with a song sung by her along with the guests. The show consists of several talks, mainly about celebrities' upcoming films. It consist of several segments like Rapid Fire, Opinions, Quiz Round, and Tongue Twister in which the winner is given a prize from the show's sponsor. The program combines comedy, celebrity, musical guests and stories from both Tomy and the guests. The program later began to feature audience participation games where prizes are awarded.

The show had once broadcast an episode featuring the Bollywood actor Shah Rukh Khan and actress Deepika Padukone for the promotion of their film Happy New Year. The entire episode were taken at Mumbai.

== Season(s) ==
Season	Host	No. of episodes	Originally broadcast (India)	
Season	Host	No. of episodes	First aired	Last aired
1	Rimi Tomy	157	7 April 2013	1 May 2016
2	Rimi Tomy	66	22 October 2016	3 February 2018
3	Rimi Tomy	31	3 February 2018	17 March 2019
4	Rimi Tomy	19	17 November 2019	29 March 2020

== List of episodes ==
=== Season 4 ===
The 4th season of Onnum Onnum Moonu began telecasting since 17 November 2019.

No.	Guest(s)	Date of Broadcast	Featured Promotion
1	Krishna Kumar, Sindhu Krishna, Ahaana Krishna, Diya Krishna, Ishaani Krishna, Hansika Krishna	17 November 2019	No featured promotion
2	Unni Mukundan, Prachi Tehlan & Achuthan (Cameo)	24 November 2019	Mamangam
3	Mithun Ramesh, Divya Pillai, Veena Nair	1 December 2019	Jimmy Ee Veedinte Aishwaryam
4	Avanthika Mohan, Rayjan Rajan	8 December 2019	Priyappettaval (TV series)
5	Anna Ben, Rony David, Noble Babu Thomas	15 December 2019	Helen
6	Afsal, Akhila Anand, Ranjini Jose, Anwar Sadath	29 December 2019	No featured promotion
7	Gabri Jose, Roshan Abdul Rahoof, Sania Merin	5 January 2020	No featured promotion
8	Boban Samuel, Namitha Pramod, Ranjin Raj	12 January 2020	Al Mallu
9	Malavika Wales, Rekha Ratheesh, Yuva Krishna	19 January 2020	Manjil Virinja Poovu (TV series)
10	Ineya, Arun Raghav, Swathy Thara, Shiyas Kareem	26 January 2020	No featured promotion
11	Anand Menon, Neeraj Madhav, Sayanora Philip, Punya Elizabeth	2 February 2020	Gauthamante Radham
12	John Jacobs, Reshmi Soman, Nimisha	7 February 2020	Anuragam (TV series)
13	Juhi Rustagi, Rovin George, Hemanth Menon, Nilina	14 February 2020	No featured promotion
14	Prayaga Martin, Deepak Parambol, Abhishek Raveendran	21 February 2020	Bhoomiyile Manohara Swakaryam
15	Sreejith Ravi, Krishna Praba, Greeshma, Samad Sulaiman, Adarsh Venugopalan	28 February 2020	Varkey
16	Swasika, Shanavas Shanu	6 March 2020	No featured promotion
17	Dhanya Mary Varghese, Suchithra Nair	11 March 2020	No featured promotion
18	Thara Kalyan, Sowbhagya Kalyan, Arjun Somasekhar	11 March 2020	No featured promotion
19	Anaswara Rajan, Kavya Prakashan, Najim Arshad, Nandana Varma	29 March 2020	Vaanku

=== Season 3 ===
Onnum Onnum Moonu season 2 was abruptly stopped in February 2018 and after a gap of 6 months the show relaunched in a new format with chit chat and game sessions.

Episode	Guest(s)	Note(s)
1	Shaan Rahman, Swetha Mohan	
2	Anoop Menon, Miya George	
3	Prayaga Martin, Shafi, Bibin George	
4	Mukundan, Sarath Das, Swathy Nithyanand, Sangeetha	Cast of Bhramaram.
5	Priya Raman, Chithra	
6	Shafna, Lekshmi Pramod, Usha, Soniya Jose	Cast of Bhagya jathakam.
7	Honey Rose, Senthil Krishna	
8	Ullas Panthalam, Shibu Laban, Souparnika Subhash, Chilanka	
9	Shamna Kasim, Vaikom Vijayalakshmi	
10	Vivek Gopan, Ronson Vincent	
11	Sanjay Mitra, KPAC Lalitha, Krishnachandran	To celebrate 30 years of Vaishali.
12	Team Dakini	
13	Ganapathi, Thanuja	
14	Srinish Aravind, Maneesh Krishna, Gouri G. Kishan	
15	Bijukuttan, Manju Pillai, Dharmajan Bolgatty	
16	Darshana Das, Niya Renjith	
17	Urvashi, Bhagyalakshmi	
18	Harikrishnan, Arya Parvathy, Varada	Cast of Ilayaval Gayathri.
19	Navya Nair, Nithya Das	
20	Samyuktha Menon, Sithara Krishnakumar	
21	Biju Sopanam, Shravana, R.Vishwa, Malavika Krishnadas	Cast of Thattumpurath Achuthan
22	Asif Ali, Balu Varghese, Joseph, Jisjoy, Aileena	
23	Shanavas, Girish Nambiar	
24	Rebecca Santhosh, Pratheeksha G Pradeep	
25	Krishna Shankar, Chandini Sreedharan, Aparna Balamurali	
26	Rajisha Vijayan, Sarjano Khalid, Arjun Ashokan, Ahammed Kabir	
27	Sai Kiran, Fawaz Zayani	
28	Harisree Ashokan, Deepak Parambol & team.	
29	Suparna Anand, Sanjay Mitra	
30	Anna Ben, Chandra Lakshman	
31	Manjima Mohan	

=== Season 2 ===
Onnum onnum moonu ran for 3 years in Manorama channel was abruptly stopped in mid 2016. With a few changes the channel relaunched the show as 'Chemmanur gold onnum onnum moonu season 2' with Rimi Tomy as the Host along with the orchestra members.

Episode No.	Guest(s)	Notes
1	Usha Uthup	
2	Anusree and Rayjan Rajan	
3	Yamuna	
4	Nadirshah, Vishnu Unnikrishnan, Prayaga Martin, Bibin	
5	Seema, Jose	
6	Monica, Akshara, Rini Raj	
7	S. Sreesanth, Pearle Maaney, Nikki Galrani	
8	Santhosh Pandit, Ranjini Haridas	
9	Akshara Kishor, Baby Meenakshi	
10	Priyamani, Mustafa	
12	Ranjini, Jalaja	
13	P. C. George	
14	Sarath Das, Sajan Surya, Harishanth Saran	
15	Ashokan, Prem Kumar	
16	Anu Sithara, Bhagath Manuel	
17	Stephen Devassy	
18	Nandini, Paris Laxmi	
19	Neerav Bavlecha, Prasanna master	
20	Manju Warrier, Shane Nigam	
21	Gayathri Arun, Gayathri Suresh	
22	Alina Padikal	Comedy Circus team
22	Richard NJ, Mridula Vijay, Chilanka	
24	Srinivas	
25	Manoj K Jayan	Vishu
26	Rajisha Vijayan, Malavika Nair	
27	Veena Nair, Subi Suresh	
28	Unni Mukundan	
29	Vaikom Vijayalakshmi	
30	Ramya Nambeesan	
31	Charmila, Saleema	
32	Beena Antony, Manu	
33	Namitha Pramod	
34	Shalu Kuranju, Pratheesh Nanda	
35	Honey Rose, Omar Lulu, Vishak Nair	
36	Malavika Wales, Srinish Aravind, Vinaya Prasad, Subash	Serial – Ammuvinte Amma
37	Asif Ali	
38	Madhu (actor), Sheela (actress)	
39	Gautami Tadimalla	Along with other actors of E (2017 film)
40	Meghna Vincent, Dimple Rose	
41	Roshan Mathew, Prayaga Martin	
42	Sreelakshmi, Manju Pillai	
43	Jomol, Parvathy Nambiar	
44	Deepti Sati	
45	Rajani Chandy, Subbalakshmi	Onam Episode
46	Ahaana Krishna, Aishwarya Lekshmi	
47	Shafna, Kiran, Sneha Divakar	Serial – Nokketha Doorathu
48	Shanthi Krishna	
50	Jayaram	
51	Manju, Sneha	Serial -Marimayam
53	Aparna Balamurali, Nimisha Sajayan	
54	Jagadeesh, Rekha	
55	Adil Ibrahim	
56	Aiswarya Mithun, Sajan Surya, Arun	Serial – Bharya (TV series)
57	Menaka, Rohini	
58	Suchithra Nair, Umadevi Nair	Serial – Vanambadi (TV series)
59	Maqbool Salmaan, Divyadarshan, Ajmal	
60	Mathukkutty, Raj Kalesh	Prog – Udan panam (Christmas celebration)
61	Shelly Kishore, Vishnuparasad	Serial – Sthreepadham
62	Vijay Yesudas	
63	Nyla Usha, Rahul Rajasekharan	
64	Sithara, Nimisha Sajayan, Sshivada	
65	Akhila, Jassie Gift	
66	Pearle Maaney, Rahul Ravi	

=== Season 1 ===
Episode No.	Guest(s)	Notes
Episode 1	Nivin Pauly, Aju Varghese	
Episode 2	Nivin Pauly, Aju Varghese	
Episode 108	Ambili Devi, Sajitha Betti, Swapna, Leena Nair	Serial – Ente Pennu
Episode 122	M. K. Muneer, Biju Narayanan	
Episode 123	Jewel Mary	
Episode 124	Vidhu Prathap, Vijay Yesudas, Gayathri	
Episode 125	Vidhu Prathap, Vijay Yesudas, Gayathri	
Episode 126	Vinay Forrt, Kalabhavan Shajohn, Ananya	
Episode 127	Team Kunjiramayanam	
Episode 128	Manjari, Basil	
Episode 129	Sithara, Madhupal	
Episode 130	Balachandra Menon, Gayathri	
Episode 131	Mrudula Murali, Mithun Murali	
Episode 132	Sajitha Madathil, Thesni Khan	
Episode 133	Nadirshah, Saju Navodaya	
Episode 134	Sudev Nair, Jayaraj Warrier, Indulekha	
Episode 135	Asif Ali, Anusree	
Episode 136	Gayathri Suresh, Aparna Vinod	
Episode 137	Malavika Wales, Rahul Ravi, Archana Susheelan, Sneha Divakar	Serial – Ponnambili
Episode 138	Siddharth Menon, Eva Pavithran	
Episode 139	K. G. Markose, Daleema, Elizabeth Raju	
Episode 140	Easow Album	Christmas Special
Episode 141	Rafi, Shafi, Jagadish	
Episode 142	Parvathy Thiruvoth Kottuvata, Aparna Gopinath	
Episode 143	Dhyan Sreenivasan, Neeraj Madhav, Bijukuttan	
Episode 144	Akshara Kishor, Niranjana, Varkichan	
Episode 145	Harisree Yousouf, Malavika Nair, Jayachandran	
Episode 146	Nandu, Seema G. Nair	
Episode 147	Sithara Krishnakumar, Sruthi Lakshmi	
Episode 148	Vijay Babu, Kavya Madhavan	
Episode 149	Abhirami, Neena Kurup, Sruthi Lakshmi, Krishna Prabha	
Episode 150	Subbalakshmi, Thara Kalyan, Soubhagya	
Episode 151	Sethu Lakshmi	
Episode 152	Chandini Sreedharan, Hannah Reji Koshy	
Episode 153	M. G. Sreekumar	
Episode 154	M. G. Sreekumar	
Episode 155	Sheelamma	
Episode 156	Sheelamma	
Episode 157	Sayanora Philip, Ranjini Jose	
