= Nipin Niravath =

Indian mentalist

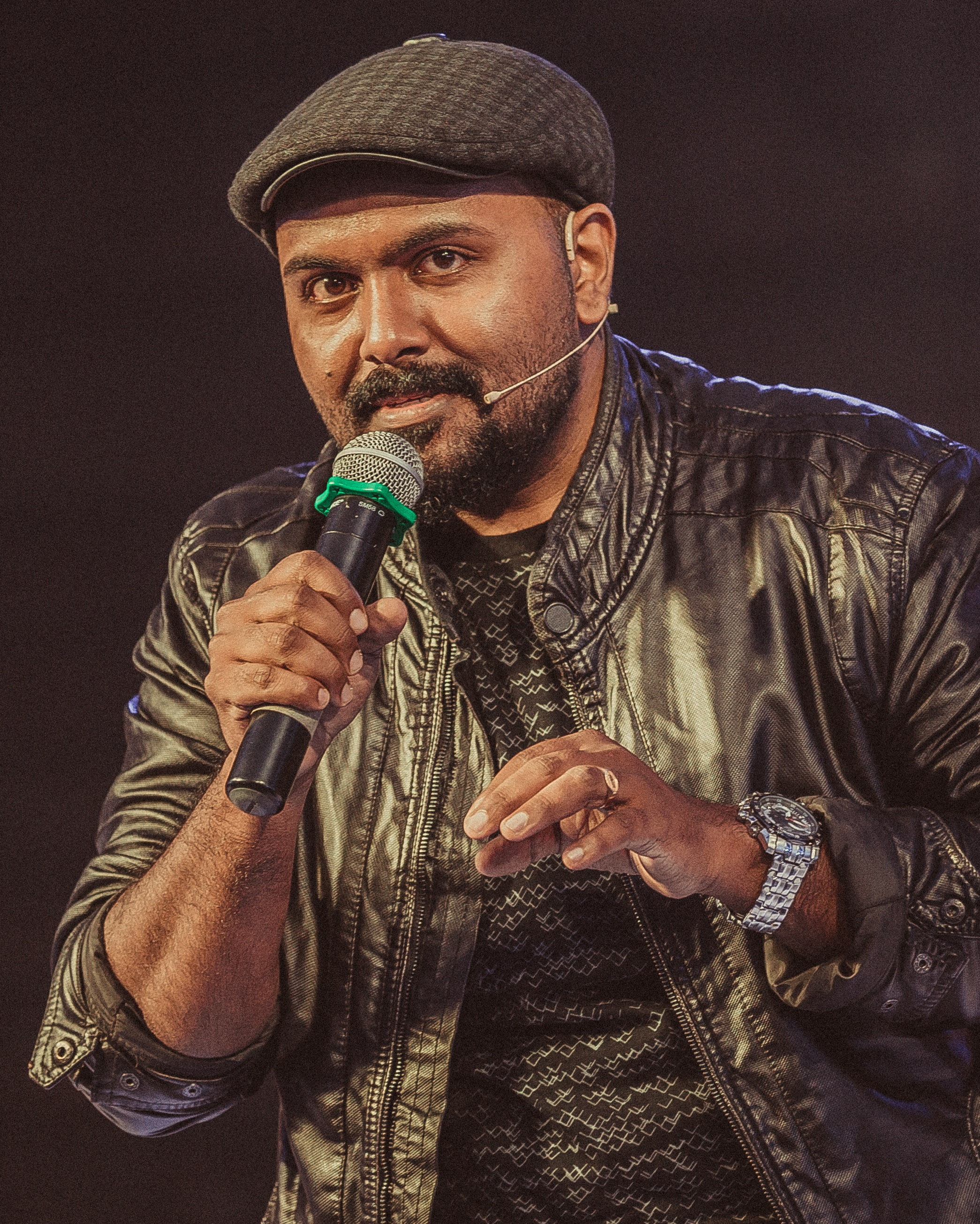
- Nipin Niravath performs onstage in 2017
- Born: 16 August 1982 (age 44); Kottayam, Kerala, India
- Occupation: Mentalism
- Years active: 2003–present
- Website: nipinniravath.com

Nipin Niravath (born 16 August 1982) is an Indian mentalist, psychological entertainer, illusionist, mind reader, and motivational speaker. Born and raised in Kerala, India, Niravath's shows blend elements of psychology, magic, and entertainment and include mind reading, predictions, and illusions.

== Personal life ==
Nipin Niravath was born and raised in Kerala, India, where he developed his passion for magic and entertainment. Despite facing initial skepticism from his family, Niravath pursued his dreams and entered the world of mentalism.

== Career ==
In 2003, Nipin joined USAID's social awareness programme and started his career as a street magician. Nipin has appeared on several TV series, including Onnum Onnum Moonu, Comedy Super Nite, Ugram Ujjwalam, and Comedy Stars.

In 2018, Nipin appeared as a guest speaker for the CADD Arabia talk show Connecting Dots.

== Recognition and Achievements ==
Nipin Niravath's contributions to the field of mentalism have earned him recognition as one of the foremost mentalists in India.. He holds the record for being the youngest magician in Kerala to attempt the 'great fire escape act,' demonstrating his desire in pushing the boundaries of traditional magic.

== Television shows ==
Year	Program	Channel	Notes
2017	Comedy Stars	Asianet (TV channel)	
2018	Vismayam - The mentalist	Kairali TV	
2019	Thakarppan Comedy	Mazhavil Manorama	
2019	Ugram Ujjwalam	Mazhavil Manorama	
2019	Comedy Stars	Flowers TV	
2019	Comedy Super Nite	Flowers TV	
2019	Onnum Onnum Moonu	Mazhavil Manorama	

== Stage Performances ==
Year	Program	Notes
2017	Intuitions at JT Pac	
2018	Muscat Show	
2018	Cryptic at Trivandrum	
2018	Connecting Dots at Qatar	
2023	Cryptic 2.0 at JT Pac	
