= Tourist Home (film) =

- Theatrical poster
- Directed by: Shebi Chowghat
- Produced by: John Joseph
- Starring: Hemanth Menon; Meera Nandan; Sreejith Vijay; Rejith Menon; Sreejith Ravi; Kalabhavan Mani; Nedumudi Venu; Lena; Sarayu; Saiju Kurup; Roshan
- Cinematography: Firoz Khan
- Music by: Jasnifer Maharoof
- Production company: Mega Media Films
- Distributed by: Happy and Ruby Cinema Release
- Release date: 5 July 2013
- Country: India
- Language: Malayalam

Tourist Home is a 2013 Malayalam thriller film directed by Shebi. The film plots a series of incidents that take place in the 10 rooms of a tourist home. It is written by ten writers and is produced under the banner of Mega Media. The highlight of the film is that the entire story is filmed using a single shot. It is arguably the first Indian film to be made using this technique.

The film has an ensemble cast featuring more than 40 actors including Hemanth Menon, Meera Nandan, Sreejith Vijay, Rejith Menon, Sreejith Ravi, Kalabhavan Mani, Nedumudi Venu, Lena, Sarayu, Saiju Kurup and Roshan.

== Plot ==
The film traces a series of incidents that take place in the 10 rooms of a tourist home. The plot revolves around the following characters: two young boys who have a bad past due to their unethical lives, an old man who has come for the medical aid for his grandson in the medical college, a policeman and a prostitute, a woman who is forced to resort to unlawful means to earn money to meet the medical expenses for her ill husband, a man who fear to attend an interview and his friend, an astrologer who chants different ways to get a peaceful mind, a daughter who tries to remind the unethical ways of her father, a woman, her daughter and dance master to participate in a dance reality show, a woman who has come to abort her pregnancy from her husband's friend, and a gang who has taken a room for gambling, who are all staying in that ten rooms of the Tourist Home.

== Cast ==
- Hemanth Menon as Jojo
- Meera Nandan as Reshma
- Sreejith Vijay
- Rejith Menon
- Sreejith Ravi as Rajeev
- Kalabhavan Mani as traffic cop
- Nedumudi Venu
- Lena
- Sarayu as Anitha
- Saiju Kurup
- Suvith Krishna as Aloysius
- Roshan Basheer as Sajan
- Madhupal as Mammootty
- Kochu Preman as money lender
- Kottayam Nazeer as a thief
- Edavela Babu as Chackochan
- Maniyan Pilla Raju as Sathyanathan
- Chembil Ashokan as a pimp
- Sunil Sukhada as a dance instructor Peethambaran
- Kunchan
- Narayanankutty as Shivankutty
- Ajay Nataraj as a thief
- Thesni Khan
- Sreelatha Namboothiri
- Archana Menon as a hooker
- Mukundan

== Production ==
The story of the film has some similarities with V. K. Prakash's 2012 film Trivandrum Lodge, which also showcases the lives of tenants in a lodge. However, Shebi, who had earlier directed Plus Two, says, "I have been working close to two-and-half years to put together a team and to perfect the technical side of the film. So, when Trivandrum Lodge was announced, I was a bit nervous; I felt that all my work would go down the drain because we took so long to begin." About shooting the entire film in a single shot, he says, "I was inspired by the movie Russian Ark, which was filmed using a single sequence. The climax scene in Lal Jose's Classmates used a similar technique. That's when the idea of doing an entire film stringing together different stories and capturing it in a single shot struck me."

== Reception ==
A critic from Rediff.com wrote that "Yet, Tourist Home is an interesting one-time watch".
