= Simrat Kaur =

Indian actress (born 1997)

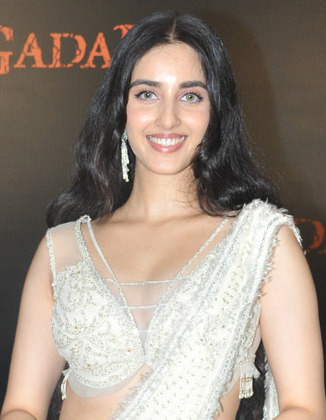
- Kaur in 2023
- Born: Simrat Kaur Randhawa; 16 July 1997 (age 28); Mumbai, Maharashtra, India
- Occupation: Actress
- Years active: 2017–present
- Known for: Dirty Hari (2020); Gadar 2 (2023); The Bengal Files (2025); Gadar 3 (2027)

Simrat Kaur Randhawa (born 16 July 1997) is an Indian actress. She is known for her works in Telugu and Hindi cinema. She debuted in 2017 with the film Prematho Mee Karthik.

== Early life ==
Simrat was born on 16 July 1997 and brought up in Mumbai in a Punjabi Sikh family. She has graduated in B.Sc Computer Science.

== Career ==
She made her acting debut in Rishi's Telugu romantic drama film Prematho Mee Karthik in 2017 starring opposite Kartikeya. In 2018, she acted in Parichayam and Soni. She was chosen as the female lead for Telugu romantic thriller Dirty Hari starring alongside Shravan Reddy in the Indian adaptation of Match Point.

She was featured in Punjabi music videos like Burj Khalifa and Laara Lappa by Himmat Sandhu. In 2022, she also appeared in Punjabi video song Loafer by GG Singh. In 2021, she featured in the romantic song "Tere Bin Zindagi" by Mika Singh. In 2022 she appeared in a cameo role in Nagarjuna starrer Bangarraju. In 2023, she played the role of Utkarsh Sharma's wife and Sunny Deol's daughter-in-law in Gadar 2, released on 11 August.

== Filmography ==
†	Denotes films that have not yet been released

Year	Film	Role	Language	Notes	Ref.
2017	Prematho Mee Karthik	Anjali	Telugu		
2018	Parichayam		Telugu		
2018	Soni	Nishu	Hindi		
2020	Dirty Hari	Jasmine	Telugu		
2022	Bangarraju		Telugu	Cameo role	
2023	Maya Petika		Telugu		
2023	Gadar 2	Muskaan	Hindi		
2024	Vanvaas	Meena	Hindi		
2025	The Bengal Files	Young Bharati Banerjee	Hindi		
