= Sajan Surya =

Indian actor

Sajan Sooreya
- Born: Sajan S. Nair; 21 September 1978 (age 47)
- Education: Mahatma Gandhi College in Thiruvananthapuram, Kerala
- Occupations: Actor; Anchor; Model; Producer; Government servant in Kerala Registration Department
- Years active: 2000–present
- Notable work: Sthree; Kumkumapoovu; Bharya; Geethagovindam
- Spouse: Vineetha
- Children: 2

Sajan Sooreya is an Indian actor who is known for his appearances in Malayalam soap operas. He has won several accolades including four Asianet Television Awards for Best actor.

He has done over 100 television series and has established himself as the most bankable actor in Malayalam television. Before foraying into Television, he did theatre performances under his own troupe Arya Communication. Currently he owns a production company named Trio.

== Personal life ==
Sajan was born to Satheeshan and Suryakala. He is a Clerk in Registration Department of the Government of Kerala. He is married to Vineetha and the couple has two daughters. They live in Thiruvananthapuram.

== Acting credits ==
Television serials (partial)
Year(s)	Show	Role	Channel	Notes
2000	Ashwathy		DD Malayalam	Television debut
2000	Detective Anand	Detective officer	DD Malayalam	
2000	Dayana		DD Malayalam	
2001-2002	Jwalayayi	Police Officer	DD Malayalam	
2001	Sthree	Gopan	Asianet	
2002	Snehadooram		Asianet	
2002	Akkarapacha		Asianet	
2002	Sthreejanmam	Mayamma's bridegroom	Surya TV	
2003	Sthree Oru Punyam		DD Malayalam	
2004	Sthree Hridayam	Kailath Krishna Prasad(young)	Surya TV	
2004	Thalolam	Giri	Asianet	
2005-2006	Thulabharam	Vishwan	Surya TV	Unreleased serial with only promo been released
2006-2009	Veendum Jwalayayi	Richie a.k.a Richard	DD Malayalam	
2006	Sthree	Gopan	Asianet	
2007	Unniyarcha	Aromal Chekavar	Asianet	
2007	Swami Ayyappan	Arjuna	Asianet	
2007	Priyamanasam		Surya TV	
2007	Ammakkayi	Jithendran	Surya TV	
2007	Sree Guruvayoorappan	Unni	Surya TV	
2007	Prayaanam	Elias	Surya TV	
2007-2008	Nirmalyam	Nandhan	Asianet	
2007-2008	A Amma		Kairali TV	retelecasted during the first lockdown of 2020
2008	Kanakkuyil	Dr.Harikrishnan	Asianet	
2008	Officer		Amrita TV	
2008-2009	Ammathottil	Sarathchandran	Asianet	
2008-2009	Aalilathali	Izahaak a.k.a Iza	Asianet	
2008-2010	Snehathooval	Alex	Asianet	
2009	Coimbatore Ammayi		Amrita TV	
2010	Snehatheeram	Nandhan	Surya TV	
2010	Lipstick	Vipin Mohan	Asianet	
2010-2011	Dream City	Sethu	Surya TV	
2011	Alavudeente Albhuthavilaku	Ali Baba a.k.a. Kunjikkaka	Asianet	
2011-2012	Manasaveena	Kailash	Mazhavil Manorama	
2011-2012	Suryakanthi		Jaihind TV	
2011-2012	Kanalpoovu	Sivaram	Jeevan TV	
2011-2014	Kumkumapoovu	Mahesh	Asianet	Break Role
2012	Innale		Surya TV	
2012-2013	Nilapakshi	Harikrishnan	Kairali TV	
2013-2015	Amala	Arjun	Mazhavil Manorama	
2014-2015	Vadhu	Akhil/Nikhil	Surya TV	
2014-2015	Ente Pennu	Mukundhan	Mazhavil Manorama	
2015	Ithal		Amrita TV	
2015-2016	Sthreedhanam	Film actor Kiran	Asianet	Extended Cameo
2016-2019	Bharya	Naren a.k.a Narendran	Asianet	
2016	Sagaram Sakshi	Kannan	Surya TV	
2017-2018	Mamangam	Adv.Vishnu	Flowers TV	
2018-2019	Ilayaval Gayathri	Manu a.k.a Manoj	Mazhavil Manorama	
2018	Police	Deepu	ACV	
2019	Sabarimala Swami Ayyappan	Harichandra	Asianet	
2019	Kasthooriman	Shankar	Asianet	Extended Cameo
2019-2020	Kerala Samajam	Manohar	Asianet	
2020–2021	Jeevithanouka	Palackal Jayakrishnan	Mazhavil Manorama	
2021-2022	Ente Maathavu	Murali	Surya TV	
2023	Koodevide	Govind	Asianet	Guest appearance
2023-2025	Geeta Govindam	Arakkal Govind Madhav		

2026 - Amme Mookambike - Surya TV

2026 - Mukhachithram - Mazhavil Manorama

=== Other television shows ===
- Aram+Aram=Kinnaram (2021) as team captain
- Let's rock and roll (2021) as Contestant
- Kutty Chef (2020) as Judge
- Thakarppan Comedy (2019) as Contestant
- Urvashi Theatre (2018) as himself in Promo
- Sell Me the Answer as Contestant
- Ningalkkum Aakaam Kodeeshwaran as Contestant
- Onnum Onnum Moonu as Participant
- Munch Stars (2013) as Contestant

=== Filmography ===
Year	Film	Notes
2005	Bunglavil Outha	as Krishnanunni (Debut as a lead actor)
2006	Vrindavanam	
2009	Nayanam	
2010	Kaaryasthan	Cameo appearance in the song Mangalangal
2013	White Paper	
2014	Manam Thelinju	
2015	Thinkal Muthal Velli Vare	Extended Cameo as himself
2019	A 4 Apple	
2019	Fancy dress	
2025	Moonnam Nombaram	as Saint Joseph

=== Music videos ===
- Snehathepatty Onnum Parayaruthu
- Muhabathin Kaalathu
- Sree Mayadurga
- Ninnodithiri
- Oh Fathima
- Rosappoovin Niramanu
- Manasariyum Koottukari
- Gurudevan
- Sarana Veedhi
- Peralaserry Srimurugan
- Oru Naal
- Keralam Gathi Maatum

=== Telefilms ===
- Aa divasangalil Parayanirunnathu
- Nizhal Mathram
- Shankarananda
- Nizhal
- Thondimuthal
- Oru Yathrayude Anthyam
