= Aram Valatthisvarar Temple =

Lord Shiva temple in Kancheepuram

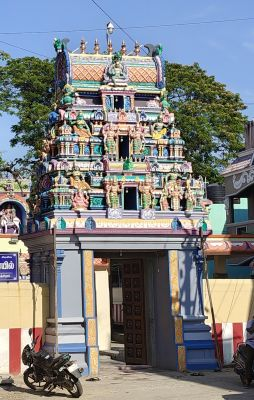

Aram Valatthisvarar Temple is a Shiva temple located in Kancheepuram, Tamil Nadu. This temple is also called as Valatthisvarar Temple.

== Presiding deity ==
The presiding deity of the temple is Aram Valatthisvarar. The shrines of Vinayaka, Muruga, Surya, and Bairava are found in this temple. This temple is under the administration of the Hindu Religious and Charitable Endowments Department, Government of Tamil Nadu.

== Pujas ==
In this temple Kamiga Agama types of pujas are held. In the Tamil month of Aippasi (mid-October to mid-November), Skanda Sasti and in the Tamil month of Āvaṇi (mid-August to mid-September), Vinayaka Chadurti are celebrated.

== Kumbhabhishekham ==
The Kumbhabhishekham of the temple was held after 52 years.
