= Valiyangadi =

Valiyangadi may refer to:

- Valiyangadi (Kozhikode), a market in Kozhikode Beach, Kozhikode, Kerala, India
- Valiyangadi (film) a 2010 Indian film
