= Roshan Basheer =

Indian film actor

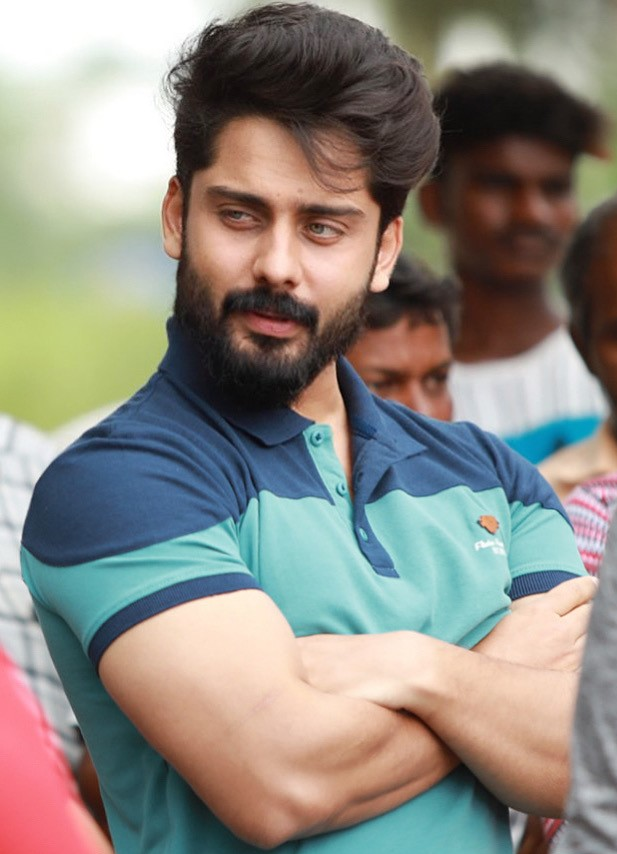
- Born: 28 June 1991 (age 35)
- Occupation: Actor
- Years active: 2010–present
- Spouse: Furzana Anub (m. 2020)
- Children: 1
- Parents: Kalanthan Basheer (father); Ramla Basheer (mother)

Roshan Basheer (born 28 June 1991) is an Indian actor, who appears in Malayalam, Telugu, and Tamil language films. He is best known for his role as Varun Prabhakar in the 2013 drama-thriller film Drishyam. He lives in Kuttiady, Kerala, and his father, Kalanthan Basheer is an actor, short film director and producer.

== Career ==
Roshan made his acting debut by playing one of the lead roles in the Malayalam coming-of-age film, Plus Two (2010). Later, he did films such as Banking Hours (2012), Tourist Home (2013) and Red Wine (2013). Roshan Basheer then portrayed the pivotal villainous character in Jeethu Joseph's successful Drishyam (2013), before being selected to reprise his role in the film's Telugu version Drushyam (2014) and then the Tamil version, Papanasam (2015) featuring Kamal Haasan.

Post the success of both films, Roshan Basheer appeared in further lead role in films including Kubera Rasi and Moondru Rasigargal. He is still pursuing movies in the Tamil, Telugu and Malayalam movie industries.

== Filmography ==
Year	Title	Role	Language	Notes
2010	Plus Two	Prince	Malayalam	
2011	Innanu Aa Kalyanam	Kunjumon	Malayalam	
2012	Banking Hours 10 to 4	Rahul's friend	Malayalam	
2013	Tourist Home	Sajan	Malayalam	
2013	Red Wine	Alfy	Malayalam	
2013	Drishyam	Varun Prabhakar	Malayalam	
2014	Drushyam	Varun Prabhakar	Telugu	Telugu remake of Drishyam
2015	Papanasam	Varun Prabhakar	Tamil	Tamil remake of Drishyam
2015	Columbus	Vamshi	Telugu	
2015	Kubera Rasi	Murugan	Tamil	
2017	Bairavaa	Charan	Tamil	
2017	Moondru Rasigargal		Tamil	
2020	Dirty Hari	Akash	Telugu	
2021	Kamitham		Malayalam	Music album
2021	Kannadi		Malayalam	
2021	Vincent and the pope	Vincent	Malayalam	
2022	Four		Malayalam	
2023	Malli Pelli	young Phaneendra	Telugu	
2023	Saandrithazh		Tamil	
2024	Rakshana	Ram	Telugu	
2024	7/G	Rajiv	Tamil	
2024	Abhirami		Malayalam	
2025	Dheeram		Malayalam	
TBA	Rachel †	Nicholas	Malayalam	Post-production
2026	Agadha	Sanjay	Telugu	
