= Agadha =

- Theatrical release poster
- Directed by: M. S. Raju
- Written by: M. S. Raju
- Produced by: Kasi Visalakshi Balusu
- Starring: Kamakshi Bhaskarla; Shravan Reddy; Ulka Gupta; Jovika Vijayakumar; Vanitha Vijayakumar
- Cinematography: Nani Chamidishetty
- Edited by: Junaid Siddiqui
- Music by: Mikkin Aruldev; Rakesh Venkatapuram
- Production companies: Haashtag Media; Sri Adi Varaha Productions
- Release date: 14 August 2026
- Running time: 137 minutes
- Country: India
- Language: Telugu
- Box office: ₹1.44 crore

Agadha is 2026 Indian Telugu-language supernatural thriller film written and directed by M. S. Raju under Sri Adi Varaha Productions banner. It stars Kamakshi Bhaskarla, Shravan Reddy, Ulka Gupta, Jovika Vijayakumar and Vanitha Vijayakumar in pivotal roles.

== Cast ==
- Kamakshi Bhaskarla as Mahadevi
- Shravan Reddy as Simha / Saleem
- Ulka Gupta as Mahima
- Jovika Vijayakumar as Harini
- Vanitha Vijayakumar as Sushila
- Shreya Rani Reddy as Manasa
- Roshan Basheer as Sanjay
- Bhanu Chander as Mahadevi's uncle
- Viva Raghava as Bablu
- Shiju

== Production ==
The first look teaser was unveiled on 30 April 2026.

=== Marketing ===
The makers of the film launched a promotional event at Balkampet Yellamma Temple for Bonam in July 2026.

== Release ==
The film was released in theatres on 14 August 2026. The film received an A (adults only) certificate from the CBFC.

== Critical reception ==
Srivathsan Nadadhur for The Hindu wrote in his review "Agadha’s female characters are either saints or victims of evil spirits. In its aim to be a layered good-versus-evil story, many characters are reduced to binaries." Divya Shree of The Times of India rated the film 2/5 stars and opined "The film's ambition to create a supernatural world larger than a conventional horror narrative is evident, but the screenplay doesn't always deliver the surprises it promises."

Chetupelli Sanjiv Kumar for Hindustan Times rated the film 2.75/5 stars. Suresh Kavirayani for Cinema Express stated "It is not a great film, but it offers a few thrills and scary moments here and there." Banda Prakash of Deccan Chronicle opined "The second half becomes overloaded with explanations, with characters spelling out the mythology instead of allowing the mystery to unfold naturally. Several twists are also predictable well before they arrive, weakening the suspense."

Suhas Sistu of The Hans India stated "The forest scenes in the second half are engaging while the action-filled episode set in the fields is entertaining. The third act, though, slightly loses steam before picking up pace once again to create an effective climax." Bhumi Vashisht for The Sunday Guardian felt a few twists land out of nowhere and wrote "The way it is directed also stays tense, so even the simple scenes feel like they’re going to turn into something major."

Sakshi Post reviewer rated the film 2.75/5 stars and opined "The CGI and visual effects are another positive. They add scale to the supernatural world and help Agadha look different from a routine horror film." Bhanuprasad Rangaiahgari of News18 Telugu also rated the film 2.75/5 stars.

The film is also reviewed by Eenadu, NTV Telugu, and TV9 Telugu.
