= Navagatharkku Swagatham =

- Directed by: Jayakrishna Karanavar
- Written by: Kalavoor Ravikumar
- Produced by: K. K. G. Nair
- Starring: Mukesh; Jyothirmayi; Rejith Menon; Shafna; Vinay Forrt
- Cinematography: Dileep Raman
- Music by: Johnson
- Production company: Dwaraka Creations
- Distributed by: Dwaraka Creations Release
- Release date: 8 June 2012
- Country: India
- Language: Malayalam

Navagatharkku Swagatham is a 2012 Malayalam campus-based film written by Kalavoor Ravikumar and directed by Jayakrishna Karanavar. Mainly filmed on locations at Kalamassery, the film stars Mukesh, Jyothirmayi, Rejith Menon, Shafna and Vinay Forrt in pivotal roles. The film's music is composed by late music maestro Johnson. The film was met with negative critical reviews and was declared as a box office flop.

== Plot ==
The film is about an English lecturer named Appettan who is like an elder brother to his students. A new boy named Prasanth joins them and they all become friends after a bit of ragging. Prasanth later confesses he likes Veena, a junior in the college, and the class tries to get Veena to fall in love with Prasanth. However Sreelakha, also a lecturer, tells Veena it's just a prank which the boys are playing, leaving Veena inconsolable. As soon as Appettan finds out, he spills out the truth about Prasanth's love from childhood to Veena. He subsequently tells Sreelakha but also says that a boy used to love her, which leaves her in tears. Near the end of the film, Appettan confesses that he was the boy that used to love Sreelakha, only to discover that Sreelakha and her husband have decided to reconcile when he goes to express his love, breaking his heart. He later receives a note which says Sreelakha reciprocates his love and her stubborn attitude was due to Appettan's failure to express his love to her in the past.

== Cast ==
- Mukesh as Rajasekharan aka Appettan
- Jyothirmayi as Sreelekha
- Miya as Elsa
- Rejith Menon as Prasanth
- Shafna as Veena
- Vinay Forrt as Aravindan
- Sadiq
- Lalu Alex as Principal
- Ashokan sree rekha husband
- Ambika Mohan as Rajasekharan's relative
- Shobha Mohan as Prasanth's mother
- Ponnamma Babu
- Chembil Ashokan as Gopalettan
- Deepak Murali as Hamza
- Rajmohan Unnithan as Dysp
- Anoop Chandran as director
