= Maya Petika =

- Promotional poster
- Directed by: Ramesh Raparthi
- Produced by: Magunta Sarath Chandra Reddy; Tharaknath Bommi Reddy
- Starring: Payal Rajput; Viraj Ashwin; Simrat Kaur; Rajath Raghav; Sunil; Prudhvi Raj; Srinivasa Reddy; Himaja; Syamala
- Cinematography: Suresh Ragutu
- Edited by: D. Venkata Prabhu; Nav Cuts
- Music by: Guna Balasubramanian
- Production company: Just Ordinary Entertainment
- Release date: 30 June 2023
- Country: India
- Language: Telugu

Maya Petika (transl. Magic box) is a 2023 Indian Telugu-language anthology film directed by Ramesh Raparthi and starring Payal Rajput, Viraj Ashwin, Simrat Kaur, Rajath Raghav, Sunil, Prudhvi Raj, Srinivasa Reddy, Himaja, and Syamala.

== Plot ==
The film narrates six short stories that are connected via a smartphone.

== Cast ==
- Payal Rajput as Payal
- Viraj Ashwin as Ali
- Simrat Kaur
- Rajath Raghav
- Sunil
- Prudhvi Raj as Corporator
- Srinivasa Reddy
- Himaja
- Syamala
- Rajiv Kumar Aneja

== Soundtrack ==
The soundtrack was composed by Guna Balasubramanian.

Track listing
No.	Title	Lyrics	Singer(s)	Length
1.	"Shanna Shanna"	Srimani	Yasaswi Kondepudi, Pragna Nayini	4:08
2.	"Sayonara"	Srimani	Harika Narayan	2:42
3.	"O Manishi"	Lakshmi Priyanka	Kaala Bhairava	4:28
4.	"Mayapetika Theme"	Srimani	M. M. Manasi	4:29
5.	"Jyothi Rap"	Lilgunda, Shubodh	Lilgunda, Shubodh	1:50
6.	"Shanna Shanna Reprise"	Srimani	Guna Balasubramanian	3:39
Total length:				21:16

== Reception ==
A critic from OTTplay gave the film the same rating and wrote that "On the whole, Maya Petika has an interesting concept but the lack of seriousness in the narration spoils the movie-watching experience for the audience".

== Home media ==
The film was released on 6 September 2023 on aha.
