= Varada (actress) =

Indian actress

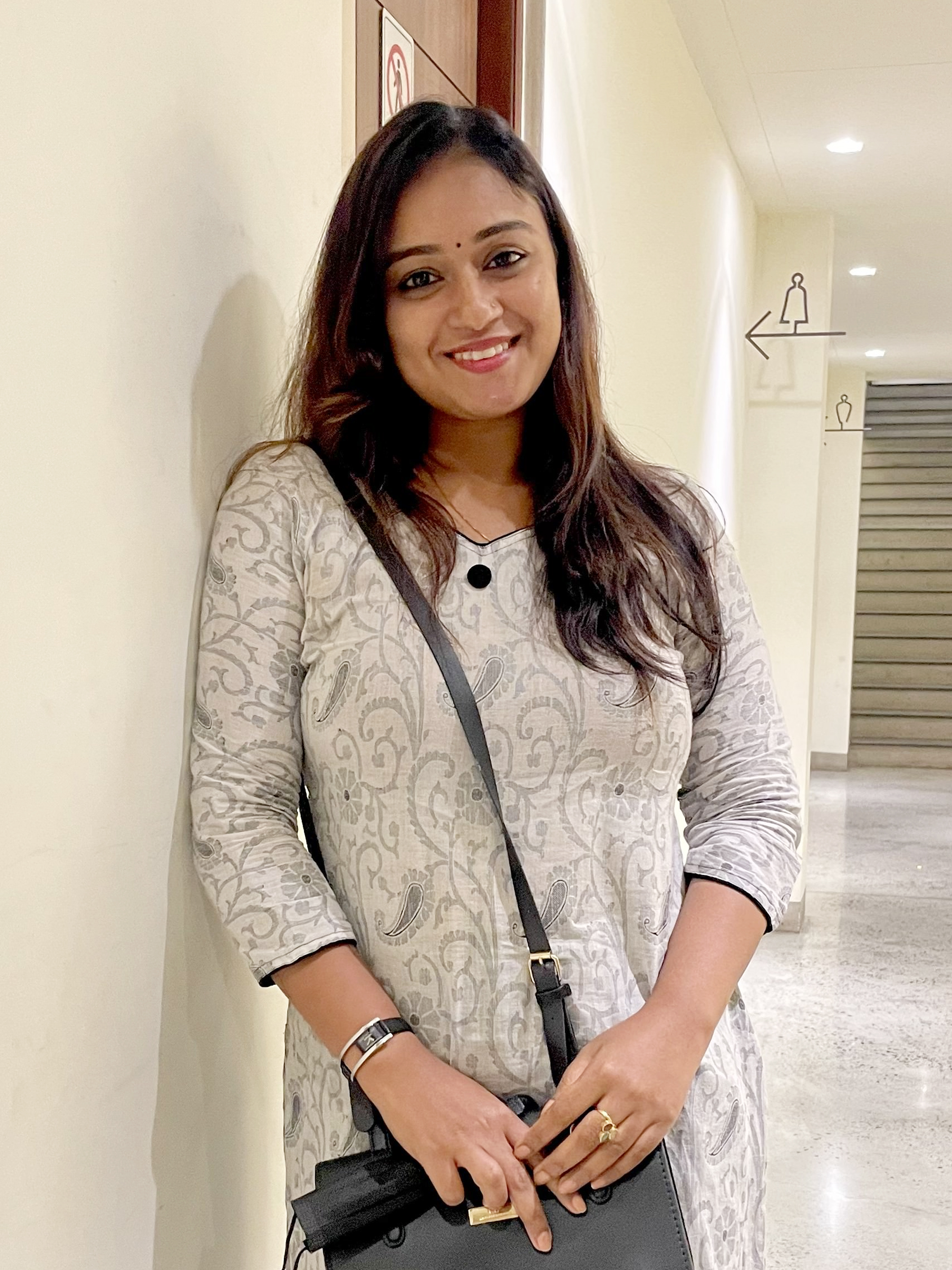
- Varada at Shenoys Theatre, Ernakulam
- Born: Emimol Mohan; 29 April 1988 (age 38); Ahmedabad, Gujarat, India
- Occupations: Actress; TV host
- Years active: 2006 – present
- Spouse: Jishin Mohan (m. 2014; div. 2022)
- Children: 1

Emimol Mohan (born 29 April 1988), better known by her stage name Varada, is an Indian actress who works predominantly in Malayalam films and television. After making her acting debut in the 2006 Malayalam film Vaasthavam, she played the lead role in the 2008 film Sultan. Her breakthrough role was with the Malayalam soap opera Amala aired from 2013 to 2015.

== Early life ==
Varada was born as Emimol Mohan on 29 April 1988 in Ahmedabad, Gujarat to Mohan Abraham and Pushpa Mohan. She has a younger brother, Eric Mohan. She was brought up and educated in Thrissur. After her primary education from Sacred Heart Convent Girls Higher Secondary School in Thrissur in 2004, Varada joined the St. Joseph's English Medium Higher Secondary School in Eravu for higher secondary education. She completed graduation in Bachelor of Arts in Economics from University of Calicut.

== Career ==
While studying in plus two (higher secondary), she modeled for a calendar and soon advertisements followed. Then, she anchored for a local television channel in her hometown Thrissur, followed by programs in Jeevan TV and Kairali TV. She made her acting debut in the film Vaasthavam in 2006. She played the female lead in Sultan in 2008. It was from Sultan that she took the stage name Varada, as per the suggestion of writer-director A. K. Lohithadas who was a mentor of the film's director. She made her television debut with Snehakoodu on Surya TV. Varada got a breakthrough with the title role in the serial Amala on Mazhavil Manorama. Then she appeared as heroine in the serial Pranayam on Asianet, which was a remake of the Hindi soap opera Yeh Hai Mohabbatein. She left the show after pregnancy. She made her come back in serial through Ilayaval Gayathri.

== Personal life ==
On 25 May 2014, Varada married her Amala co-star Jishin Mohan. The couple have a son Jian born in 2017. They separated in January 2022 and divorced in September 2022.

== Filmography ==
=== Films ===
- All films are in Malayalam unless noted otherwise.

Year	Title	Role	Notes	Ref.
2006	Vaasthavam	Balachandran's sister		
2006	Yes Your Honour	Ravishankar's niece		
2007	Agra	Pooja	Tamil film	
2008	Sultan	Nishitha		
2009	Makante Achan	Ann		
2009	Utharaswayamvaram	Ambily		
2010	Valiyangadi	Gowri		
2012	Kadhalikkalama	Priya	Tamil film	
2018	Oruthi	Title role	Short film	
2019	Ennodu Para I Love You Ennu	Lissy		
2020	Al Mallu	Gayathri		
2021	The Book	Ancy		
2023	Cheena Trophy	Raji		

=== Television ===
- All shows are in Malayalam.

Year	Title	Role	Channel	Notes	Ref.
2007–2009	Choice of Youth	Host	Jeevan TV		
2011	Patturumal	Host	Kairali TV		
2012	Snehakkoodu	Dr. Swapna	Surya TV	Replaced by Mythili Roy	
2013	Hridayam Sakshi	Bhama, Gadha (Note: Varada played two characters)	Mazhavil Manorama		
2013–2015	Amala	Amala	Mazhavil Manorama		
2014	Raaree Raareeram Raaro	Host	Asianet Plus		
2014	Chef Master (Season 2)	Host	Kaumudy TV		
2015	Spandanam	Annie	Surya TV		
2015	Kalikkalam	Contestant	Surya TV		
2015	Aarppo Erro	Contestant	Kairali TV		
2015–2016	Don't Do Don't Do	Contestant	Asianet Plus		
2015–2017	Pranayam	Dr. Lakshmi Sharan	Asianet	Replaced by Divya Nair	
2017	Tamaar Padaar	Contestant	Flowers TV		
2017	Malayali Veettamma	Supporting artist	Flowers TV		
2017	Jagratha	Shivakami	Amrita TV		
2017	Malakhayude Makal	Varada	Surya TV	Telefilm	
2017	Star War	Contestant	Surya TV		
2018	Super Jodi	Contestant	Surya TV		
2018	Thakarppan Comedy Mimicry Mahamela	Team leader	Mazhavil Manorama		
2018–2019	Ilayaval Gayathri	Gouri	Mazhavil Manorama		
2018–2019	Thakarppan Comedy	Contestant	Mazhavil Manorama		
2019	Prasnam Gurutharam	Thamara	Kairali TV		
2019	Life is Beautiful	Host	Surya TV		
2019	Keralotsavam	Team Leader	Surya TV		
2019	Boein Boeing	Contestant	Zee Keralam		
2020	Super Bumper	Contestant	Zee Keralam		
2021	Let's Rock and Roll	Participant	Zee Keralam		
2021	Moodalmanju	RJ Shyama	Flowers TV		
2022	Cook Book	Host	Raj Musix Malayalam		
2022	Golaravam	Host	Kerala Vision News		
2023–present	Sreshtha Bharatham Paithruka Bhartham	Host	Amrita TV		
2023	Mizhirandilum	Avanthika	Zee Keralam	Cameo	
2023	Shyamambaram	Avanthika	Zee Keralam	Cameo	
2023–2026	Mangalyam	Avanthika	Zee Keralam		

==== Guest appearances ====
Year	Title	Role	Channel	Notes	Ref.
2013	Sreekandan Nair Show	Guest	Surya TV		
2014	Ivide Ingananu Bhai	Guest	Mazhavil Manorama		
2014	Onnum Onnum Moonu	Guest	Mazhavil Manorama		
2014	Aswamedham	Participant	Kairali TV		
2015	Smart Show	Participant	Flowers TV		
2016	Ennishtam	Guest	Asianet Cable Vision		
2016	Run Baby Run	Guest	Asianet Plus		
2016	Comedy Stars	Guest	Asianet		
2017	Lal Salam	Special performer	Amrita TV		
2017	Celebrity League	Participant	Flowers TV		
2018	Onnum Onnum Moonu	Guest	Mazhavil Manorama		
2018	Annie's Kitchen	Guest	Amrita TV		
2019	Ponnona Ruchikal	Guest	Zee Keralam		
2020	Kudumbasametham	Guest	Asianet Cable Vision		
2021	Red Carpet	Mentor	Amrita TV		
2022	Day with a Star	Guest	Kaumudy TV		
	Ponnona Onam	Guest	Surya TV		
	Suryolsavam	Guest	Surya TV		
	Nammal Thammil	Guest	Asianet		
	Vanitha	Guest	Mazhavil Manorama		
	A Lamode	Guest	Yes India Vision		

=== Webseries ===
Year	Title	Role	Notes	Ref.
2019	Living Together	Emi	YouTube series	

== Awards and nominations ==
Year	Award	Category	Work	Result	Ref.
2013	Surasu Memorial Awards	Best Actress	Amala	Won	
2013	Colourful Film & TV Awards	Best Actress	Amala	Won	
2014	Kannur Rajan Award	Best Actress	Amala	Won	
2014	Ramu Kariat Memorial Award	Popular Actress	Amala	Won	
2014	Manappuram Minnale Award	Best Actress	Amala	Won	
2015	Vindhyan Award	Popular Actress	Amala	Won	
2015	CKMA & Malanad News Award	Popular Actress	Amala	Won	
2015	Smartsa Kannur Vision Award	Popular Actress	Amala	Won	
2016	Asianet Television Awards	Best Actress (Special Jury)	Pranayam	Won	
2016	Asianet Television Awards	Best Actress	Pranayam	Nominated	
2016	Asianet Television Awards	Best Popular Actress	Pranayam	Nominated	
2024	Zee Keralam Kudumbam Awards	Best Villathi	Mangalyam	Won	
