= Dirty Hari =

2020 film directed by M. S. Raju

- Promotional poster
- Directed by: M. S. Raju
- Written by: M. S. Raju
- Produced by: Guduru Sateesh Babu; Guduru Sai Puneeth
- Starring: Shravan Reddy; Ruhani Sharma; Simrat Kaur
- Cinematography: M. N. Balreddy
- Edited by: Junaid Siddiqui
- Music by: Mark K. Robin
- Production companies: SPJ Creations; HYLIFE Entertainment
- Distributed by: Friday Movies
- Release date: 18 December 2020 (India)
- Running time: 107 minutes
- Country: India
- Language: Telugu

Dirty Hari is a 2020 Indian Telugu-language erotic romantic thriller film written and directed by M. S. Raju. The film was produced by Guduru Siva Rama, Guduru Sateesh Babu and Guduru Sai Puneeth under their production banner, SPJ Creations. It has Shravan Reddy, Ruhani Sharma and Simrat Kaur in lead roles. The film premiered through ATT Friday Movies App on 18 December 2020. This movie is loosely inspired from the 2005 movie Match Point.

== Plot ==
Jasmine, an aspiring actress is acting in her first film but the film is stopped due to the Producer's financial issues. Hari from Nizamabad arrives at Hyderabad and Hari's friend Ram helps Hari to find a place to stay. Hari is mesmerized by seeing Jasmine in an advertisement. Hari works part time as a chess coach in a club where Hari befriends Akash. Hari meets Ravi Shankar, Akash's uncle, Prameela, Ravi's wife and Ravi's daughter, Vasudha who is interested in painting. At a party, Hari meets Jasmine who is Akash's girlfriend. Hari and Vasudha start to date and get intimate. Vasudha convinces Ravi to hire Hari in one of Vasudha Group of Companies. Hari and Jasmine flirt with each other. Jasmine gets upset after an argument with Prameela and Hari consoles Jasmine. Hari and Jasmine get intimate. Vasudha is married to Hari. Akash breaks up with Jasmine and marries another woman. Hari and Jasmine continue their affair. Hari distances himself from Vasudha, ignores Vasudha's desires and doesn't focus at work which results in loss. Jasmine informs Hari about her pregnancy. Vasudha suspects Hari for having an affair. Hari lies to Jasmine about going on a family trip with Vasudha. Hari is unable to leave Vasudha for Jasmine. Hari buys a gun and arrives at Jasmine's house. Hari tries to leave after being unable to kill Jasmine but Jasmine's friend and Jasmine see Hari with the gun and panic. A panicked Hari accidentally kills Jasmine and Jasmine's friend with the gun. Hari covers up all the evidence and attends Vasudha's 25th birthday celebration where Ravi announces Hari as the new Chairman of Vasudha group of Companies. After two days, the police find Jasmine's body and Jasmine's friend's body in a lake. During the investigation, the police suspects Hari but Vasudha and Akash cover up the case to help Hari. Vasudha convinces Hari to bring Jasmine's mother to their house. It is revealed that Vasudha is pregnant and Hari understands that Vasudha knows everything.

== Premise ==
Hari is a young man who enters into a secretive relationship with an aspiring actress named Jasmine just as Vasudha falls in love with him. Following his marriage to Vasudha, Hari continues his illicit affair with Jasmine.

== Cast ==
- Shravan Reddy as Hari
- Ruhani Sharma as Vasudha
- Simrat Kaur as Jasmine, an aspiring actress
- Roshan Basheer as Akash
- Ajay as ACP Ajay
- Aziz Naser as Police Officer
- Surekha Vani as Prameela, Vasudha's mother
- Mahesh Achanta as friend of Hari
- Appaji Ambarisha Darbha as Ravishankar

== Production ==
=== Development ===
Dirty Hari marks M. S. Raju's directorial return after his 2012 film Tuneega Tuneega. In an interview with Deccan Chronicle, Raju was quoted: "...[the bold scenes] will be shown in a poetic way. Filmmakers like Bharathan, Puttanna Kanagal, etc., have made several classical bold films in an aesthetic way. I was inspired by them and wanted to try something different." He aimed the film for an audience aged 15–35. The director said the film uses "a blend of several emotions; however, to make it more engaging to the audience we are making sure that the re-recording will aptly complement the narrative and engage the audience".

=== Casting ===
In an interview with The Hindu, Simrat Kaur stated her character to be bold and confident. She compared it to Deepika Padukone's role in 2012 Hindi film Cocktail. The auditioning team was not initially convinced with her look. For her, on screen kissing, wearing lingerie, dialogues in a husky tone was difficult.

In an interview with The Times of India, the lead actor Shravan was skeptical to sign the "bold" film. When he first heard the script, he was wary of erotic thrillers need to be handled very carefully. He described his character role as "a chess player who works part-time as a coach in a reputed chess club." In the film he plays "an ambitious guy who will go to any lengths to achieve what he wants".

=== Filming ===
Principal photography was delayed as the production house was looking for an established female lead. Filming completed in Hyderabad by end of November 2019. There are scenes in the film that were shot for 23 hours at a stretch. Simrat Kaur completed her filming portion in 20 days.

== Music ==
Dirty Hari

Soundtrack album by Mark K. Robin
- Released: 28 December 2020
- Genre: Telugu
- Length: 9:00
- Label: Mango
- Producer: Mark K. Robin

Mark K. Robin chronology
Agent Sai Srinivasa Athreya (2019)	Dirty Hari (2020)	Zombie Reddy (2021)

The soundtrack album and original score is composed Mark K. Robin. The background score was recorded in February 2020. The first single titled "Let's Make Love" written by Krishna Kanth and sung by Manisha Eerabathini was released on 24 July 2020.

Dirty Hari (Original Motion Picture Soundtrack)
No.	Title	Lyrics	Singer(s)	Length
1.	"Let's Make Love"	Krishna Kanth	Manisha Eerabathini	03:59
2.	"Dil Se Dil"	Abbas	Sarathy	02:00
3.	"Radhaa"	Shresta	Harini Ivaturi	02:37
Total length:				9:00

== Reception ==
Neeshita Nyayapati of The Times of India wrote that "Dirty Hari is old wine in a new bottle for the most part, with some redeeming parts. Give it a try if erotic thrillers are your cup of tea."
