= Njan Ninnodu Koodeyundu =

- Directed by: Priyanandanan
- Written by: Pradeep Mandur
- Produced by: Ajay K Menon; Badal Media
- Starring: Siddharth Bharathan; Vinay Forrt; Aparna Vinod; Navami Murali; Jaise Jose; Madhupal
- Cinematography: Shaan Rahman
- Music by: Sunilkumar P K
- Release date: 22 March 2015
- Country: India
- Language: Malayalam

Njan Ninnodu Koodeyundu is a 2015 Indian Malayalam-language film directed by Priyanandanan, starring Siddharth Bharathan and Vinay Forrt. The film won the John Abraham Award for Best Malayalam Film in 2014.

== Plot ==
Damanan and Madanan are petty thieves. One day their plan goes downhill and the duo jumps into a river in a bid to escape their pursuers but lose consciousness. Part of Njan Ninnodu Koodeyundu is about the dream they both see.

== Cast ==
- Siddharth Bharathan
- Vinay Forrt
- Aparna Vinod
- Navami Murali
- Jaise Jose
- Madhupal
- Antony Mathai

== Reception ==
The Times of India gave the movie 2.5 stars, stating that "Replete with performances that also feel functional at many junctures, the movie is a tad too contrived for the average audience." NowRunning was also mixed in their review, as they praised the performances by the lead actors while also writing "But there is indeed an air of artificiality that is very much there, and at times it makes the proceedings appear a bit too synthetic. The film isn't able to sustain its momentum as well in the latter half, and it all winds up in a hurry, as the two men are shaken out of the reverie that they have been caught in."
