= Saandrithazh =

- Theatrical release poster
- Directed by: J. V. R.
- Produced by: S. J. S. Sundaram; J. V. R.
- Starring: Harikumar; Roshan Basheer; Ashika Ashokan
- Cinematography: S. S. Ravimaaran Shivan
- Edited by: J. F. Castro
- Music by: Baiju Jacob
- Production company: Vettrivel Cinemas
- Release date: 4 August 2023
- Country: India
- Language: Tamil

Saandrithazh (transl. Certificate) is a 2023 Indian Tamil-language film directed by Nawin Ghanesh and starring Harikumar and Roshan Basheer in the lead roles. It was released on 4 August 2023.

== Plot ==
Karuvarai village is a prime example of a perfect village: a village with CCTV cameras that prevent crime. Upon noticing this, the government announces the president's award but the villagers refuse, leading to a conflict between the villagers and government ministers.

== Cast ==
- Harikumar as Vellaichami
- Roshan Basheer
- Radha Ravi
- Abu Khan
- Ravi Mariya
- Manobala
- Aruldoss
- Kausalya
- Ashika Ashokan
- Tanisha Kuppanda

== Production ==
Actress Tanisha Kuppanda portrayed a negative role in the film.

== Reception ==
The film was released on 4 August 2023 across Tamil Nadu. A critic from Dina Thanthi noted that the film had an "ambitious script". A review from Maalai Malar noted that there was "a lot to fix".
