= God Say =

- Official poster
- Malayalam: ഗോഡ്സേ
- Directed by: Shyju Govind; Sherry Govindan
- Screenplay by: Shyju Govind; Sherry Govindan
- Based on: Gandhimargam by TN Prakash
- Produced by: Santhosh Manikkoth; E.P Dinesh Nambiar
- Starring: Vinay Forrt; Mythili; Joy Mathew; Mamukkoya; Indrans; Santhosh Keezhattoor; Vinod Kovoor
- Cinematography: Jaleel Badusha
- Edited by: Manoj Kannoth
- Music by: Bijibal
- Production company: Snehanjali Productions
- Release date: 7 January 2017
- Running time: 106 minutes
- Country: India
- Language: Malayalam

God Say is a 2017 Indian Malayalam-language comedy drama film directed by Shyju Govind and Sherry Govindan. The film is produced by Santhosh Manikkoth and E.P Dinesh Nambiar under the banner of Snehanjali Productions. It stars Vinay Forrt, Mythili and Joy Mathew in the lead roles. The film was released on 7 January 2017.

== Plot ==
The film which is set in the background of early nineties of Kozhikode portrays the life of Harischandran (Vinay Forrt), an anarchist and a drunkard, who is an employee at the Aakashvani radio station. His life changes totally when he starts anchoring the programme named "Gandhimargam" and starts following Gandhism.

== Cast ==
- Vinay Forrt as Harichandran
- Mythili as Magdalene Gomez
- Joy Mathew
- Mamukkoya
- Indrans
- Vinod Kovoor
- Santhosh Keezhattoor
- Surjith
