= Sultan (2008 film) =

- Directed by: Sreeprakash
- Written by: Vinod Guruvayoor; Jayan Sivapuram
- Produced by: Gopi Manasseri
- Starring: Vinu Mohan; Varada; Sarayu
- Cinematography: P. Sukumar
- Edited by: Ranjan Abraham
- Music by: M. Jayachandran
- Release date: 28 November 2008
- Country: India
- Language: Malayalam

Sultan is a 2008 Indian Malayalam-language film directed by Sreeprakash, starring Vinu Mohan and Varada in the lead roles.

== Plot ==
Sivan is a medical college student better known in the campus as "Sultan" as he was considered by all as the "Sultan of Romance". He and his four childhood close friends Naufal, Sunny and Vivek form a gang in the campus and they become quite popular among the students.

Sivan is in love with Nishitha, who is also a student in the same college. Their love has been accepted by their families and they have been engaged to marry after the completion of their studies. Things take a turn when Sivan's pet-name Sultan puts him in some totally unexpected situations.

== Cast ==
- Vinu Mohan as Sivan
- Varada as Nishitha
- Sarayu as Neena
- R. J. Praveen Krishna as Sunny
- Anoop Chandran as Naufal
- Sreejith Ravi as Vivek
- Shammi Thilakan
- Reshmi Boban as Dr.
- Lalu Alex
- Jagathy Sreekumar
- Salim Kumar
- Vijayaraghavan
- Joju George
- Mustafizur Rahman
- Harish Siva

== Soundtrack ==
- "Raakuyil koottukari" - Vijay Yesudas, Shweta Mohan
- "Maa Mazha Maha" - Ranjith
- "Maa Mazha (Slow)" - Ranjith
