= Prematho Mee Karthik =

- Theatrical release poster
- Directed by: Rishi
- Produced by: Ravinder R Gummakonda
- Starring: Kartikeya; Simrat Kaur
- Cinematography: Saiprakash Ummadisingu
- Edited by: Madhu
- Music by: Shaan Rahman
- Release date: 17 November 2017
- Country: India
- Language: Telugu

Prematho Mee Karthik (transl. With love, your Karthik) is a 2017 Indian Telugu-language romantic comedy family drama film directed by Rishi and starring Kartikeya and Simrat Kaur with Gollapudi Maruthi Rao and Murali Sharma in supporting roles.

== Plot ==
NRI Karthik goes to India for thirty days as per his father's advice and Anjali. How this changes his life forms the rest of the story.

== Cast ==
- Kartikeya as Karthik
- Simrat Kaur as Anjali
- Gollapudi Maruthi Rao
- Murali Sharma as Karthik's father
- Jhansi
- Raghu Karumanchi as Khaleel Pasha
- Prudhviraj
- Pragathi as Anjali's mother
- Sumithra as Anjali's grandmother
- C. V. L. Narasimha Rao
- Mamilla Shailaja Priya
- Madhunandan as Driver
- Venu Yeldandi
- Duvvasi Mohan as police officer
- Kotesh Manava

== Production ==
The film was shot in Vagamon and Idukki in Kerala, Coorg, Goa and Hyderabad.

== Soundtrack ==
Prematho Mee Karthik

Soundtrack album by Shaan Rahman
- Released: 2017
- Genre: Feature film soundtrack
- Length: 16:23
- Language: Telugu
- Producer: Shaan Rahman

Shaan Rahman chronology
Goodalochana (2017)	Prematho Mee Karthik (2017)	Aana Alaralodalaral (2017)

The music was composed by Shaan Rahman. Reviewing the soundtrack, Karthik of Milliblog wrote, " Good Telugu debut by Shaan, this!"

Track listing
No.	Title	Singer(s)	Length
1.	"Okka Chinukulo"	Sachin Warrier, Anne Amie	4:12
2.	"Pacha Pacha Kalale"	Pranavi Acharya	3:37
3.	"Visirina Banthalle"	Shaan Rahman	3:48
4.	"Vanavaasam"	Hemachandra, Malavika	4:46
Total length:			16:23
