= Agra (2007 film) =

- Directed by: P. Chithiraiselvan
- Written by: M. Balu
- Produced by: P. Chithiraiselvan; Muthuraaman R Amirtha Anbhazhagan
- Starring: Vikas Emi Mohan Nassar
- Cinematography: P. Selvakumar
- Edited by: S. Rajesh Karna
- Music by: C. S. Baalu
- Production company: Amirtha Art Combines
- Release date: 8 November 2007
- Running time: 118 minutes
- Country: India
- Language: Tamil

Agra is a 2007 Indian Tamil-language romantic drama film directed by Chithiraiselvan, starring Vikas and Emi Mohan. It was released on 8 November 2007.

== Cast ==
- Vikas as Kannan
- Emi Mohan as Pooja Thakur
- Nassar as the older Kannan
- Anjali as Neema
- Ennur Murali
- Gayathri
- Archana
- V. M. Ravi Raj
- K. C. Ravithevan
- Abhinayashree (special appearance in the song "Moodu Nalla")
- Y. Gee. Mahendra in a guest appearance

== Production ==
The film marked the acting debut of Vikas, the son of dance choreographer John Babu. In December 2006, the crew of the film undertook a promotional campaign to ask the public to vote for the Agra-centred Taj Mahal in the New 7 Wonders of the World campaign organised by New 7 Wonders Foundation.

In 2013, six years after the film's release, the film's director and producer P. Chithiraiselvan was arrested for failing to pay back loans on sums taken out for the production of Agra and Thalaivan (2014).

== Soundtrack ==
Soundtrack was composed by C. S. Balu. The song "Moodu Nalla" is based on the song "Thanni Karuthiruchi" from Ilamai Oonjal Aadukirathu (1978).

- "Chinna Chinna" - Shruthi Vandhana
- "Ushaa Pannu" - Sathyan
- "En Jeevan" - Karthik, Preethi
- "Moodu Nalla" - Manikka Vinayagam
- "Kadhal Vali" - Harish Raghavendra
- "Unnal Thane" - Murugu RK
- "Shaam Milan" - Chinmayi

== Reception ==
The film was released on 8 November 2007, coinciding with the festival of Diwali. In the review by Sify.com, the critic noted "Agra, is a simple straightforward love story, packaged with enough steamy scenes to attract the audiences and carrying an "A" certificate with cuts from the censors", adding "the film's main attraction is the steamy scenes in the first half and a sizzling provocative item number from Abhinayashree post-interval". Malini Mannath of ChennaiOnline.com wrote "The debutant director has chosen some eye-catching locations as the backdrop for his scenes. But the script is weakly etched". The reviewer added "The most irrelevant part of the script, these seem to be a desperate attempt by a debutant director to hard-sell a love-caper with the help of some sleaze." A reviewer from Webdunia also gave the film a negative review, calling out the film's adult theme.
