= Kohinoor (2015 film) =

Indian heist comedy film

- Theatrical poster
- Directed by: Vinay Govind
- Written by: Ranjeet Kamala Shankar; Salil V
- Produced by: Asif Ali; Sajin Jaffer; Brijeesh Muhammed
- Starring: Indrajith Sukumaran; Asif Ali; Aju Varghese; Vinay Forrt; Chemban Vinod Jose
- Cinematography: Pradheesh M. Varma
- Edited by: Arju Ben
- Music by: Rahul Raj
- Production company: Adam's World of Imagination
- Distributed by: Time Ads
- Release date: 24 September 2015
- Running time: 143 minutes
- Country: India
- Language: Malayalam

Kohinoor is a 2015 Indian Malayalam-language heist comedy film, set in the late 1980s. The film is directed by Vinay Govind and features Indrajith Sukumaran and Asif Ali in the lead roles along with an ensemble cast of Aju Varghese, Chemban Vinod Jose, Vinay Forrt, Aparna Vinod, and Shraddha Srinath. It was produced by Asif Ali in his debut film production and was co-produced by Sajin Jaffer and Brijeesh Muhammed under the banner Adam's World of Imagination. Rahul Raj composed the original music.

The film was released on 24 September 2015 to mixed reviews . It released online through Reelmonk for audiences abroad a few weeks later.

== Plot ==
The story is set in 1988. Haider who worked for the Mumbai underworld develops a plan to steal diamonds from a racket based in the Kohinoor textile store in Cherupuzha run by Mamman and Xavier. He hires Nicholas and Freddy from Kochi for the theft. They in turn make a sub-contract to a small-time thief, Aandikunju, who gets his friend, Louis, involved to steal for the group. Louis as a 1980s characterized youth has admiration for the underworld dons and is highly fascinated by Mammootty's character, Tharadas, from the popular film Athirathram and Mohanlal's character, Sagar Alias Jacky, from the popular film Irupatham Noottandu, and wants to be a successful smuggler like them. The team runs into various obstacles during the robbery. In the end, both Haider and Louis' teams take a share of the diamonds by risking their lives.

== Cast ==
- Indrajith Sukumaran as Haider
- Asif Ali as Louis
- Nebish Benson as young Louis
- Aju Varghese as Antappan
- Vinay Forrt as Freddy
- Chemban Vinod Jose as Nicholas
- Shraddha Srinath as Nancy
- Aditi Ravi as Freddy's Lover
- Aparna Vinod as Daisy
- Sudheer Karamana as Maman
- Dinesh Prabhakar
- Riza Bava as Xavier
- Biju Kuttan
- Appunni Sasi as Narayanan
- Mamukkoya as Aaliyakka
- Guru Somasundaram as Naikkar
- Kundara Johny as Superintendent of Police
- Sagar Shiyas as Kuriakose

=== Cameo appearances ===
- Bhavana as Lilly
- Saiju Kurup as DYSP George
- Pradeep Kottayam as Lilly's father
- Harikrishnan as Charlie

== Critical reception ==
Malayala Manorama rated 2.75 out of 5 stars and concluded "Kohinoor is a fun-filled thriller and has all the elements of an entertainer, with a pinch of romance, friendship and wicked twists" and gave special mention to cinematography and lead performances especially for Indrajith's screen presence and dialogue delivery.

Filmibeat.com rated 2.5 out of 5 stars and described it as "A well-packed entertainer with the right elements of humour, thrill and nostalgia", giving special mention to Indrajith's performance, also cinematography, editing, art and costumes which help create the ambience of the 80s. Indiaglitz rated 3 out of 5 stars and wrote "It has a liner narration and what would stead the movie in good stead is the comic touch throughout. 'Kohinoor' has been able to make it till the far end and not flatter halfway".

The Hindu stated "The proceedings before interval, which focusses on the planning of the heist, are marked by aimlessness. Things pick up post-interval especially in the long sequence set inside the textile shop. The quick twists and turns come together in the end to make an average heist movie in the end".

== Soundtrack ==
Kohinoor

Film score by Rahul Raj
- Released: 10 September 2015
- Studios: Sound Factory, Cochin
- Genre: Film soundtrack
- Label: Muzik 247
- Producer: Rahul Raj

Rahul Raj chronology
Ain (2015)	Kohinoor (2015)

All the songs are composed, arranged, and produced by Rahul Raj. The lyrics were written by B. K. Harinarayanan. Muzik 247 was the music label. The audio launch was held in Kochi on 8 September. Apart from the cast and crew, film personalities, such as Mammootty, Sibi Malayil, Kunchacko Boban etc. were also present. Mammooty and Sibi Malayil together launched the audio by unveiling the CD. The songs were streamed live on Muzik247's YouTube channel at the event. The official launch of the production house, Adams World of Imagination, was held coinciding with the audio launch function. It was launched by Mammootty.

The melody Hemanthamen which was released on 5 August, received an overwhelming response from critics and the public alike. It garnered more than 100000 views within three days of release on YouTube and as of 6 December 2016, the song has reached to three million views. Actor Dulquer Salmaan officially released and shared the YouTube link of the song "Dum Dum Dum" on Facebook.

No.	Title	Artist(s)	Length
1	"Hemanthamen"	Vijay Yesudas	4:18
2	"Dum Dum Dum"	Vineeth Sreenivasan	4:0
