= Amala (TV series) =

Indian Television series

- Genre: Drama
- Written by: Joyce
- Directed by: Rajiv Nedumkandom
- Starring: See below
- Country of origin: India
- Original language: Malayalam
- No. of seasons: 1
- No. of episodes: 419

Production
- Producers: Aneesh Unnithan; Asha Vivek Unnithan
- Running time: 20-22 minutes
- Production company: Rohini Vision

Original release
- Network: Mazhavil Manorama
- Release: 17 June 2013 – 30 January 2015

Amala (ml; അമല) was an Indian television series aired on Mazhavil Manorama channel for 419 episodes. Varada played the main protagonist Amala in this serial opera. The show had its telecast from Monday to Friday at 8 pm.Amala got an ending on 30 January 2015.Eventhough the serial had a re-run on Mazhavil Manorama from March 2017, it was discontinued later.

Amala told the story of a pure hearted girl Amala, who had to struggle for survival. The serial became popular in Malayalee households.

== Cast ==
- Varada as Amala Narendran (Ammu) - Main Female lead
- KPAC Saji as Narendran Thambi, Amala's Husband (Male Lead)
- Sajan Surya as Arjunan - Parallel Male lead
- Jishin Mohan as Hareesh - Main Antagonist
- Kumarakam Raghunath as Vijayakrishnan
- Beena Antony as Sudharma Vijayakrishnan
- Maneesh Krishna as Sudeesh, Neeraja's Husband
- Angel Mariya as Neeraja Vijayakrishnan
- Bindhu Ramakrishnan as Mutashi, Vijayakrishnan's Mother
- Jayan
- Subhash Nair as Jayan - Antagonist
- Sabarinath as Devan - Antagonist
- M. B. Padmakumar as Narendran Thampi's henchmen
- Adithyan Jayan as Mahima's husband
- Manju Satheesh as Vineetha, Vijayakrishnan's sister
- Anila Sreekumar as Gayathri, Vijayakrishnan's sister
- Kezia Joseph/Neethu Thomas as Mahima Vijayakrishnan
- Karthika Kannan
- M. R. Gopakumar as Achutha Kuruppu
- Yamuna Mahesh as wife of Achutha Kuruppu
- Geetha Salam
- Meghna Vincent as Nayana,Neeraja's best friend
- Pratheeksha G Pradeep
- Sreedevi Anil
- Manu Nair
- Ambareesh
- Parvathy Raveendran
- Sumi Santhosh
- Alis Christy
- Anushree
- Prabha
- Chaya Govind
- Ambika Mohan as Radhamani, Amala's Mother
- Rukmini
- Parvathy
- Kalady Omana
