= Shafna Nizam =

Indian actress

- Born: Thiruvananthapuram, Kerala, India
- Occupation: Actress
- Years active: 1998 – 2001; 2007 – present
- Spouse: Sajin TP (m. 2013)
- Parent(s): Nizam; Shahida

Shafna Nizam is an Indian actress who is active in Malayalam films and television serials. She made her acting debut as a child artist in Malayalam with Chinthavishtayaya Shyamala (1998). She played the lead role in television series “Sundari”, marking her TV debut. She received a Kerala State Television Award for Best Actress in 2016 for Sahayathrika establishing herself as a lead actress in Malayalam television industry.

== Acting career ==
Shafna was well recognized by the Malayalam audience from the films Katha Parayumbol and Oru Indian Pranayakatha. She was also well appreciated for her role in the film Athmakadha, where she acted as a school-going youth who turns blind like her father. Her dialogue "Ayyo acha pokalle" in the film Chinthavishtayaya Shyamala is extremely popular among Malayali audience. Post-marriage she made her debut into Malayalam television with the serial Sundari which rose her into fame and is currently active on Malayalam serial industry.

== Personal life ==
Shafna was born as the second daughter of Nizam and Shahida. She has an elder sister Shabna and younger sister Shaina. Shafna married her longtime boyfriend Sajin TP; her co-actor in the Malayalam film Plus two, on 11 December 2013. Sajin later rose to fame essaying the role of Shivaramakrishnan in the TV series Santhwanam.

== Filmography ==
Year	Film	Role	Language	Notes
1998	Chinthavishtayaya Shyamala	Kavya	Malayalam	Child Artist
1998	Pranayavarnangal	Aarathi's relative	Malayalam	Child Artist
2001	Pularvettam	Priya	Malayalam	Child Artist
2007	Katha Parayumpol	Sona	Malayalam	
2008	Kuselan	Balakrishnan's Elder Daughter	Tamil	Remake of Katha Parayumpol
2008	Kathanayakudu	Balakrishna's Elder Daughter	Telugu	Remake of Katha Parayumpol
2008	Shakespeare M.A. Malayalam	Drama actress	Malayalam	Cameo
2009	Bhagavaan	Lady at hospital	Malayalam	
2009	Kanmazha Peyyum Munpe	Rosemary	Malayalam	
2010	Aagathan	Gautham's Sister	Malayalam	
2010	Plus Two	Meenakshi	Malayalam	
2010	Athmakadha	Lillykutty	Malayalam	
2012	Navagatharkku Swagatham	Veena	Malayalam	
2012	Naughty Professor	Herself	Malayalam	Guest Appearance
2012	Banking Hours 10 to 4	Merrin	Malayalam	
2013	Lokpal	Neethu	Malayalam	
2013	Oru Indian Pranayakatha	Divya	Malayalam	
2016	Marubhoomiyile Aana	Bride	Malayalam	Guest Appearance
2022	Soulmate	Gayathri	Malayalam	Short film
2025	Prayam Premam Prakshobham	Thara	Malayalam	Webseries

== Television ==
=== Serials ===
Year	Serial	Role	Channel	Notes	Ref.
2015-2016	Sundari	Gadha/Annie/Karthumbi	Mazhavil Manorama	Television debut	
2016	Sahayathrika	Madhumita	Surya TV	Kerala State Television Award for Best Actress	
2016	Jagratha	Deepika	Amrita TV		
2017–2018	Nokketha Doorath	Aswathy/Suhara	Mazhavil Manorama		
2018	Priyankari	Female lead	European online TV series		
2018–2020	Bhagyajathakam	Indulekha	Mazhavil Manorama		
2021–2022	Srimanthudu	Kaveri	E TV	Telugu debut serial	
2021–2022	Priyankari	Daisy	Flowers TV		
2023- 2024	Manimuthu	Radhika	Mazhavil Manorama		
2026-present	Mazhathorum Munpe	Oormila	Asianet		

=== TV shows ===
Year	Show	Channel	Notes
2012	Ini Samvritha Ottaikkalla	Mazhavil Manorama	Host
2012	Varthaprabhatham	Asianet News	Guest
2015	Onnum Onnum Moonu Season:1	Mazhavil Manorama	Guest
2015	Comedy Super Night	Flowers	Guest
2016	Annies Kitchen	Amrita TV	Guest
2017	Onnum Onnum Moonu Season:2	Mazhavil Manorama	Guest
2018	Onnum Onnum Moonu Season:3	Mazhavil Manorama	Guest
2018	Tharapakittu	Kaumudy TV	Guest
2018	Day with a Star	Kaumudy TV	Guest

== Awards ==
- 2016 – Kerala State Television Award for Best Actress (Sahayathrika)
