= Naduvan =

- Official release poster
- Directed by: Sharran Kumar
- Written by: Sharran Kumar
- Produced by: Lucky Chhajer
- Starring: Bharath; Aparna Vinod; Gokul Anand
- Cinematography: S. Yuva
- Edited by: Sunny Sawrav
- Music by: Dharan Kumar
- Production company: Cue Entertainment
- Distributed by: SonyLIV
- Release date: 24 September 2021
- Country: India
- Language: Tamil

Naduvan (transl. Umpire/Neutral) is a 2021 Indian Tamil-language action thriller film written and directed by Sharran Kumar in his directorial debut. The film stars Bharath and Aparna Vinod, with Gokul Anand and Aruvi Bala in supportive roles. It was directly released on Sony LIV on 24 September 2021.

== Plot ==
The film revolves around a happy couple, Karthik and Madhu, who lives with their young daughter. Shiva is a partner in Karthik’s tea factory. Guru, a worker in the factory, learns of a secret involving Shiva and Madhu. He is threatened. Meanwhile, a sequence of events leads to Karthik waiting for an opportunity to take revenge on his wife and partner.

== Cast ==
- Bharath as Karthik
- Aparna Vinod as Madhu
- Gokul Anand as Shiva
- Aruvi Bala as Guru
- Dasarathi Narasimhan as Kathir
- George Maryan as Pazhani
- Yog Japee

== Production ==
The film was announced by actor turned director Sharran Kumar who also revealed that he had nearly spent one and a half years to finish the script due to being busy with his acting assignments and schedules. The film was to be made as a thriller with lead actor Bharath in the role of a young father of a young girl. Portions of the film were set in Kodaikanal. The shoot of the film wrapped up on early January 2019.

== Soundtrack ==
The soundtrack was composed by Dharan Kumar.

- Kaalai Adhikaalai - Sid Sriram
- Yaarin Vaazhkai - Santhosh Jayakaran

== Reception ==
The Times of India wrote, "Director Sharran Kumar wants us to take this material seriously and tries to break the events into chapters and gives voice-overs about how there is a face behind every mask and a story behind each face, to make us believe there is more to the film that meets the eye. But unfortunately, such a gimmick only smacks of pretentiousness given how uninvolving the scenes are. The film actually has to become a completely different genre film to keep us engaged."
