= Aparna Vinod =

Indian actress

- Born: Cochin, Kerala, India
- Education: M.Sc. Psychology
- Occupations: Actress; dancer; model
- Years active: 2012–present
- Spouse: Rinil Raj P K (m. 2022–2025)
- Parent(s): Vinod Ponnan, Vaiga Sukumar
- Relatives: Gayatri Vinod

Aparna Vinod is an Indian actress. She made her film debut in 2015 with the Malayalam film Njan Ninnodu Koodeyundu.

== Early life and education ==
Aparna was born in Ernakulam in Kerala to entrepreneur Vinod P (a descendant of Padmanaban Palpu) and outfitter/designer Vaiga Sukumar. She attended school at St. Thomas Residential School during her early years and went on to complete her 10th standard from Fr. Mathew Alakalam Public School, Chalakudy graduating from Saraswathi Vidyalaya in Trivandrum.

Aparna graduated in B.Sc., Psychology under the University of Calicut at Sahrdaya College of Advanced Studies. She has done her M.Sc. in psychology from Presidency College, Madras.

== Personal life ==
Aparna married Rinil Raj on 28 November 2022 in Kozhikode, Kerala.

== Career ==
=== Film ===
Aparna debuted in 2015 in the Malayalam industry through Njan Ninnodu Koodeyundu, a Malayalam-language Indian feature film directed by Priyanandanan, starring opposite Siddharth Bharathan and Vinay Forrt in a lead role.

In her second film Kohinoor, she played the lead female role alongside Asif Ali.

After the success of Kohinoor, her debut in the Tamil film Industry came in the form of a role in a Vijay movie, playing a minor role as a friend of the female lead Keerthy Suresh, who gets killed, in the 2017 Tamil film, Bhairavaa. The film was directed by veteran Tamil Director Bharathan.

=== Drama ===
At the Zonal and University Level arts festival conducted by the University of Calicut in 2017, Aparna Vinod played the role of a central female character who went through various stages of life, from a teenaged girl to a revolutionary character, in a play inspired by the Greek tragedy Oedipus Rex.

Her work in the play earned her critical acclaim and two university level awards including Best Actress in a Leading Role for English Drama. Critics praised her method acting skills and dedication to the role.

In January 2018, Aparna was awarded the title of Best Actress in a Leading Role at the Zonal Level by the University of Calicut for her performance in the critically acclaimed English language play, Road To Redemption, Which drew strong influences from plays like Dickens' A Christmas Carol and Oscar Wilde's "The Happy Prince". The key theme of the play deals with the protagonist's struggle with Oedipus Complex.

== Filmography ==
Year	Film	Role	Language	Notes
2015	Njan Ninnodu Koodeyundu	Thaara	Malayalam	Debut Film
2015	Kohinoor	Daisy	Malayalam	heroine
2017	Bairavaa	Vaishali	Tamil	Debut Film (Tamil)
2021	Naduvan	Madhu	Tamil	
