= Aathmakatha =

2010 Indian Malayalam film by Premlal

- Directed by: Premlal
- Written by: Premlal
- Produced by: Santhosh Pavithram; Shafeer Sait; Vidya Santhosh (co-producer)
- Starring: Sreenivasan; Shafna; Sharbani Mukherjee; Jagathy Sreekumar
- Cinematography: Sameer Haq
- Edited by: Mahesh Narayanan
- Music by: Mohan Sitara
- Production company: Pavithram Creations
- Distributed by: Pavithram Creations
- Release date: 20 August 2010
- Running time: 134 minutes
- Country: India
- Language: Malayalam

Aathmakatha (English: Autobiography) is a 2010 Indian Malayalam film written and directed by debutant Premlal starring Sreenivasan, Shafna, Sharbani Mukherjee and Jagathy Sreekumar. Athmakadha finds its niche in a classic genre of mainstream Malayalam films that include the works of directors like Bharathan and Padmarajan.

Sreenivasan plays a blind man named Kochubaby while Sharbani Mukherjee plays Mary, his wife. The film talks about the positivism in life of the visually impaired Kochubaby. The film was selected for various international film festivals and was screened at the IFFI, Goa in the Indian Panorama section. Premlal received many awards for 'Athmakadha' including a special jury award at the Kerala State Film Awards for direction and Ramu Kariat award. Sreenivasan won the Asianet Film Award Honour Special Jury Award.

The soundtrack for the film was composed by Alphons Joseph with lyrics written by Kaithapram and Engandiyoor Chandrasekharan.

== Plot ==
Kochubaby is a blind man working in a candle factory run by the local church for handicapped, in a remote hillside village. Although he is blind, he can do almost everything that other people do. Kochu is able to smile at the world and is a satisfied man. He shares a warm friendship with the local priest, Fr. Punnoose. A new blind employee, Mary, joins the factory. Slowly, the duo falls in love and marries.

They become blessed with a girl child soon and they name her Lilly. One day, as they are returning from the hospital after taking polio vaccination for the child, Mary meets with an accident while crossing the road and dies on the spot. Kochu then brings up the child. Years later, while Lilly is taking her 10th board exams, she also feels that her vision is going blurry. The doctors confirm that she has an incurable disease in her nerves and she will go blind sooner or later.

Lilly is heartbroken hearing this. She does not appear for the rest of the exams. Later she decides to commit suicide and gets herself a bottle of poison. But Kochu finds out the bottle and hides it from her. In the next scenes, Kochu tries hard to make his daughter believe that it is not the end of the road and in the world, there is space for the handicapped. She becomes more courageous and starts doing things with her eyes shut. In the last scene of the movie, we see Lilly losing her sight completely, she laughs at it saying that she is not afraid of blindness anymore.

== Cast ==
- Sreenivasan as Kochubaby
- Shafna as Lillykutty
- Sharbani Mukherjee as Mary
- Jagathy Sreekumar as Father Punnoos
- Sreelatha Namboothiri as Paili
- Bindu Panicker as Saramma
- Munshi Venu as Eenashu
- Chempil Asokan as Kumaran
- Nisha as Rosie
- Babu Namboothiri
- Ambika Mohan as Amina
- Shalu Kurian

== Music ==
1. "Kannithinkal" - Karthik
2. "Pontharakame" - Alphons Joseph
