= Bairavaa =

- Theatrical release poster
- Directed by: Bharathan
- Written by: Bharathan
- Produced by: B. Venkatarama Reddy
- Starring: Vijay; Keerthy Suresh; Jagapathi Babu
- Cinematography: M. Sukumar
- Edited by: Praveen K. L.
- Music by: Santhosh Narayanan
- Production company: Vijaya Productions
- Distributed by: Sri Green Productions
- Release date: 12 January 2017
- Running time: 171 minutes
- Country: India
- Language: Tamil
- Budget: ₹60 crore
- Box office: ₹112 crore

Bairavaa is a 2017 Indian Tamil-language action thriller film The film was written and directed by Bharathan, and produced by B. Venkatarama Reddy. The film stars Vijay in the titular role alongside Keerthy Suresh, Jagapathi Babu, Daniel Balaji, Sathish, Thambi Ramaiah, Mime Gopi, Sija Rose, Harish Uthaman and Aparna Vinod.

The music was composed by Santhosh Narayanan, while the editing and cinematography were handled by Praveen K. L. and M. Sukumar. After entering production in early 2016, the film progressed under the tentative title of Vijay 60 before being named as Bairavaa during September 2016.

Bairavaa was released on 12 January 2017 and received mixed to positive reviews from critics.

== Plot ==
Bairavaa is a collection agent for ICCI Bank in Chennai, willing to employ even violent means to get back money from debtors. During his manager's daughter's wedding, he comes across Malarvizhi, a medical student from Kallidaikurichi in Tirunelveli district, and falls in love with her. He cutely talks to her and tries to get to know her. When he goes to the Koyambedu bus station to propose his love to Malar before she leaves Chennai, he notices her cornered by a group of thugs who plan to kill her, as she is allegedly involved in an attack on Union Minister's son Charan. However, they back off after Periyakannu alias PK, from Tirunelveli calls them and tells them not to harm her. Bairavaa confronts Malar, who reveals why PK spared her life.

Past: Malar studies at PK Medical College in Tirunelveli, whose chairman is PK, a butcher-turned-influential gangster and politician, who runs Tirunelveli along with his right-hand man, Kottai Veeran. The college has no basic facilities, including a proper building and good doctors. Malar and her friend, Vaishali, filed a complaint against the college to the MCI, who decided to suspend the college after noting the poor facilities. To save his reputation, PK makes a deal with the MCI officials to revoke the suspension in exchange for them to sleep with a girl from the college. Vaishali is the girl chosen by the officials, and she is later found raped and dead the next morning. Malar's father, who is a police officer, begins the investigation into PK's involvement in Vaishali's death, but PK kills him in retribution.

After her father's death, Malar filed a petition against PK in court, where the judge ruled that Malar could not be expelled and must not suffer harm until the court resolves the case. Though PK respects the judge's decision, he harasses Malar indirectly through the college lecturers and cuts her power and water supply. He plans to kill her once the judge declares the verdict in his favour. During the wedding, Malar gives the video evidence of Vaishali's assault to Charan since he can access the NIC to investigate the video. Later, PK's henchmen attack Charan, who takes the video evidence and blames Malar.

Present: On hearing Malar's story, Bairavaa decides to help her fight PK and get justice for Vaishali. He beats up the goons there and leaves for Kallidaikurichi with Malar. Posing as an income tax officer, Bairavaa conducts a raid at PK's mansion, taking away all the evidence which holds PK responsible for Vaishali's death. PK then rushes to Malar's house to recollect the proof, but Bairavaa won't give it up. PK can't kill him either because he won't get the evidence. He decides to spare Bairavaa and taunts him until he gets the proof. He sends Malar's brother-in-law to recollect the evidence from Bairavaa. He slaps Bairavaa, but Bairavaa hits him back and leaves him empty-handed. Kottai Veeran's goons kidnap Bairavaa and bring him to Kottai Veeran, but he fights them off.

Eventually, PK gets back the evidence and destroys it, leaving Bairavaa with no evidence to implicate PK, though he gets five more days from the court to get the required proof. Right after the court, PK's goons try to light up Bairavaa to burn him alive and do a petrol bunk murder attempt, but he makes it out alive barely. Malar's sister's daughter gets kidnapped, so Bairavaa bravely saves her, but he gets shot and hit with a metal rod. Kottai Veeran captures him, but he eventually escapes. Bairavaa then learns that Kottai Veeran's wife has died and decides to take advantage of Kottai Veeran's love for his wife to get him on his side and make him approve of PK.

Bairavaa switches PK's asthma inhaler with nitrous oxide. PK, who inadvertently inhales the gas before going to Kottai Veeran's wife's funeral, begins to laugh uncontrollably, even during the funeral, causing Kottai Veeran to turn against him and accept Bairavaa's offer of becoming approver. In revenge for betraying him, PK confronts Kottai Veeran and hacks him to death. Bairavaa lures PK's goons to an abandoned building and fights them. He gets hacked by the same weapon that killed Kottai Veeran but makes it out barely alive. He then frames PK for plotting to assassinate the Prime Minister of India while he is on the way to the Kudankulam Nuclear Power Plant. The news spreads across India, and the government orders to shoot PK on sight.

Realising that the commandos cornered him, PK tries to kill Bairavaa by shooting and choking him brutally, but Bairavaa subdues him and escapes. He then disguises himself as a NSG commando, where he blends in with the real NSG commandos, who have arrived at the building and brutally kills PK. The court declared a verdict favouring Bairavaa and Malar and shifted the PK Medical College's students to another college. In a press conference, Bairavaa revealed the importance of education and that other private colleges should also have basic facilities to educate children. Bairavaa and Malar marry and live happily. The family performs Vaishali's last rites.

== Cast ==
- Vijay as Bairavaa
- Keerthy Suresh as Malarvizhi
- Jagapathi Babu as Periya Kannu aka PK
- Daniel Balaji as Kottai Veeran
- Sathish as Shanmugam
- Thambi Ramaiah as Narayanan
- Mime Gopi as Karuvadu Kumar
- Sija Rose as Poongodi, Malar's sister
- Harish Uthaman as Prabha, Malar's brother-in-law
- Aparna Vinod as Vaishali
- Papri Ghosh as Shailaja Venkatesan
- Sriman as PK's assistant
- Aadukalam Naren as Malar's father
- Sharath Lohitashwa as Union Minister
- Roshan Basheer as Charan
- Rajendran as M. Rajendran
- Y. G. Mahendran as R. Venkatesan
- Vijayaraghavan as Vaishali's father
- Seema G. Nair as Vaishali's mother
- G. Marimuthu as Pandurangan
- Malavika Avinash as Judge
- Charles Vinoth as MLA
- Shanmugarajan as PK's advocate
- Vastan Veeramani as malar's lawyer
- Sugunthan as PK's henchman
- Vishalini as Kottai Veeran's wife
- Vittal Rao as Malar's grandfather
- Subhashini as Malar's friend
- Baby Monika Siva as Poongodi's daughter
- Thavasi Raj as PK's henchman
- Rajie Vijay Sarathy as Mrs. Venkatesh
- Abhirami as College Student
- Ananya as College Student
- Santhosh as College Student
- Vaishali as Kottai Veeran's victim
- Osthe J. Ram as Kumar's henchman
- Thangamani Prabhu as Medical College Investigation Officer
- Besant Ravi in a special appearance
- Dinesh special appearance in song "Pattaya Kelappu"

== Production ==
Keerthy Suresh plays a college girl in the film. Rajendran plays a police officer in the film, which marks his second collaboartion with Vijay after Theri (2016). Papri Ghosh was signed as the third female lead after Keerthy Suresh and Aparna Vinod. R. K. Suresh was cast as the third villain in this movie, joining the likes of Jagapati Babu and Daniel Balaji.

On 18 September 2016, the film's title was revealed to be Bairavaa. A schedule was shot at Binny Mills in Chennai.

== Soundtrack ==
Bairavaa (Original Motion Picture Soundtrack)

Soundtrack album by Santhosh Narayanan
- Released: 24 December 2016
- Recorded: 2016–2017
- Genre: Feature film soundtrack
- Length: 21:43
- Labels: Lahari Music; T-Series
- Producer: Santhosh Narayanan

Santhosh Narayanan chronology
Guru (2017)	Bairavaa (Original Motion Picture Soundtrack) (2016)	Meyaadha Maan (2017)

Santhosh Narayanan was signed to compose the film's music and collaborated with Vijay and Bharathan for the first time. Vijay and Priyadarshini recorded a song for the film.

Tracklist
No.	Title	Lyrics	Singer(s)	Length
1.	"Pattaya Kelappu"	Vairamuthu	Ananthu, Benny Dayal	4:44
2.	"Nilaayo"	Vairamuthu	Haricharan	4:39
3.	"Pa Pa"	Vairamuthu	Vijay, Priyadarshini	4:04
4.	"Azhagiya Soodana Poovey"	Vairamuthu	Vijaynarain, Darshana KT	4:08
5.	"Varlaam Vaarlam Vaa Bairavaa"	Arunraja Kamaraj, Roshan Jamrock	Arunraja Kamaraj, Roshan Jamrock	3:56
Total length:				21:43

The song "Varlaam Varlaam Vaa Bairavaa" is played for a fight sequence in the 2017 Hindi film Golmaal Again.

== Release ==
=== Theatrical ===
Bairavaa released theatrically worldwide on 12 January 2017 coinciding Pongal week.

=== Distribution ===
The Kerala theatrical rights were sold to Ifar International.

== Reception ==
=== Critical reception ===
Bairavaa received mixed to positive reviews from critics.

M Suganth of The Times of India gave 2.5 out of 5 stars and wrote "There are some elements that work... like the robust action blocks, which keep reminding us of how the film could have been so much more than what it is now, the references to Vijay (the one that appears just before the interval, during an action scene, is one of the few highlights) and the star himself. By now, the actor can play these roles in his sleep, and he tries his best to keep things entertaining. He even makes us take a poorly written and staged courtroom scene with all seriousness." Sify gave 3 out of 5 stars and wrote "The movie keeps the audience entertained, thanks to the two intelligently choreographed action sequences (cricket stunt and the interval block) along with a touching flashback. As usual, Vijay once again proves his capability of carrying a film on his strong shoulders. Keerthy Suresh as a homely girl from Nellai, played her portions well. Bharathan's catchy punchlines that every mass dialogue of Ilayathalapathy receives the thundering response and makes the movie an engaging entertainer". The Hindu rated 2 out of 5 stars and wrote "Compare Bairavaa with Chiranjeevi's new film, which looks like every scene has been polished with Brasso." Ananda Vikatan rated the film 41 out of 100.
