= Plus Two =

- Theatrical poster
- Directed by: Shebi
- Screenplay by: Jain George
- Story by: Shebi
- Produced by: Ramesh Babu
- Starring: Roshan Basheer; Shafna
- Cinematography: Dileep Raman
- Edited by: Mahesh Narayanan
- Music by: Songs: Manu Ramesan; Background score: Kannan
- Production company: Risun Pictures
- Distributed by: Berries & Company
- Release date: 13 August 2010
- Country: India
- Language: Malayalam

Plus 2 is a 2010 Malayalam film directed by Shebi Chavakkad, starring Roshan Basheer, Shafna, Vishnu Mohan, Justine John, Deepak Murali and Sajin. The film tells a simple tale of youngsters doing their pre-university course. It released on 13 August 2010 across theaters in Kerala, to mainly positive reviews.

== Plot ==
The story of Plus Two revolves around five teenagers—Holy Prince, Faizal, Shambhu, Mathews and Ranjit. Prince (Roshan Basheer) is a 12th-grade student who stays alone in a villa as his parents are abroad. A girl, Meenakshi (Shafna) with the purpose of looking around for her sister Parvathy, arrives at the wrong address (Prince's house). The death of her mother causes him to sympathize with her and he decides to help her. As time passes, secrets are revealed, and changing situations force them to be more mature than their age demands.

== Cast ==
- Roshan Basheer as Prince
- Shafna as Meenakshi
- Sajin TP as Renjith
- Vishnu Mohan as Faizal
- Justine John as Shambhu
- Deepak Murali as Mathews
- Salim Kumar as Lalappan/Lalettan
- Suraj Venjarammoodu as Dinosaur
- KPAC Lalitha as Valyammachi
- Sai Kumar as Cheriyan
- Manianpilla Raju as Avarachan
- Geetha Vijayan as Alice
- Sona Nair as Mollykutty
- Kochupreman as the security
- Shobha Mohan as Saraswathi Amma
- Reshmi Boban as Parvathy

== Reception ==
Sify's critic rated the film and stated, "There are certain films which narrate some rather unconvincing stories, but told in a neat way at the same time. Director Sheby's Plus Two is one such film. Yes, you can easily find flaws with the way it has been told and also with the script, but there are certain things about it that you would like as well." The critic concluded his review saying, "Plus Two has its moments and is perhaps more enjoyable than some of the much hyped films that has come to the theatres during recent times." Paresh C. Palicha of Rediff.com rated the film and also wrote a positive review concluding that "there is hardly any reason to complain as Plus Two keeps us entertained."

== Soundtrack ==
All lyrics are written by S. Ramesan Nair; all music is composed by Manu Ramesan.

No.	Title	Singer(s)	Length
1.	"Kannolam"	Swetha Mohan, Karthik
2.	"Pakalilla Raavilla"	Roshan, Jassie Gift
3.	"Thaane"	Ajay Sathyan
4.	"Vellaram Kannulla"	Manjari, Vineeth Sreenivasan
5.	"Thamara Katte"	Selvaraj
6.	"Puthumakalaay"	Vidhu Prathap
7.	"Manjaadi"	Anjana, Manjari
8.	"Thaane"	Jyotsna
