= Bhagyajathakam (TV series) =

Indian Malayalam soap opera

- Genre: Drama; Soap opera Romance
- Written by: Anil Bass
- Directed by: Riju Nair
- Starring: Shafna Nizam
- Theme music composer: Lyrics; O.K. Ravisankar; Singer; Kavalam Sreekumar
- Opening theme: "Thanathinthaka Thalam"
- Ending theme: "kanmaniye thedi amma manam thengi"
- Composer: Sanand George (Background score)
- Country of origin: India
- Original language: Malayalam
- No. of episodes: 438

Production
- Producer: Bini Jayakrishnan
- Cinematography: Priyadarshan
- Camera setup: Multi-camera
- Running time: 22 minutes

Original release
- Network: Mazhavil Manorama
- Release: 23 July 2018 – 23 March 2020

Bhagyajathakam (transl. Lucky horoscope) is an Indian Malayalam-language soap opera launched on 23 July 2018 on Mazhavil Manorama. Shafna Nizam played the female protagonist of the series.

== Plot ==
Indulekha, a 22-year-old poor girl survives by selling milk to the neighborhood on a daily basis. Born to Parvathy Shenoy, the sole daughter of the affluent Shenoy family, she was abandoned by her relatives at birth who makes Parvathy believe that her child is dead. She was then adopted by another family.

The engagement of the sole son of the same family's current head Vishwanath Shenoy (Indulekha's maternal uncle) was cancelled due to issues with horoscope. According to the astrologer who examined Vishwanath Shenoy's son, Arun's horoscope, the very first bride will die miserably within six months of the marriage. The shrewd Shenoy then decided to search for a financially poor girl for their son after temporarily holding the marriage with the rich girl.

Indulekha was chosen by Shenoy for the purpose and entered the Shenoy family as the daughter-in-law. Without knowing that it was her own mother who was enslaved by the elder Shenoy, she started her new chapter of life in the same house with her actual mother. Nothing happened Indulekha even after six months. Shenoy worried and summoned the same astrologer who realized that prediction went wrong due to incorrect birth time given. The astrologer also realized that Indulekha's horoscope is a lucky one and this further frustrates Shenoy. He now wanted to eliminate Indulekha at any cost. Indulekha becomes pregnant. Parvathy decides to write all her assets in Indulekha's name.

Vishwanath Shenoy now introduces Neeraja whom he claims is the daughter of his sister Parvathy. Arun, influenced by his ex-girlfriend Abhirami and Neeraja, tries to kill Indulekha's baby; but later learns the truth and starts loving Indulekha. Meanwhile, Indulekha is told her birth secrets by her stepfather but vows to keep it silent and not to disclose it to Parvathy until she learns Neeraja's intention.

== Cast ==
=== Main ===
- Shafna Nizam as Indulekha
- Gireesh Nambiar / Sidharth Venugopal as Arun Shenoy

=== Recurring ===
- Manve Surendran / Karoline / Lekshmi Pramod as Abhirami
- Sindhu Varma as Parvathy Shenoy
- Balachandran Chullikadu / Mahesh as Vishwanath Shenoy
- Manoj Pillai / Kishore as Sukumaran
- Archana Menon / Soniya Baiju Kottarakkara as Subhadra Shenoy
- Fawaz Zayani as Reghuraman
- Vishnu V Nair as Ananthan
- Sumi Santhosh / Sindhu Jacob / Usha as Sumathi
- Vishnu Prakash as Prabhakara Kurup
- Bindu Ramakrishnan as Subhashini Amma
- K.P.A.C Leelamani as Rosamma
- Arathy Sojan as Madhuri
- Yamuna Mahesh as Radhika
- Vipin James as Vikraman
- Nithu Thomas as Lakshmi
- Payyannur Murali as Raghu's father
- Shreya Raj Nair as Neeraja
- Karthika Kannan as Janaki
- Neena Kurup as Vasanthi
- Kottayam Rasheed as Kanakambhuran
- Faizal Razi
- Blessy Kurien as Reshma
- Ambili Sunil
- Adhithyan Jayan as Tomichan
