= Ilayaval Gayathri =

Indian Television series

- Genre: Drama; Soap opera
- Developed by: Sudhakar Mangalodayam
- Written by: Gireesh Gramika / Prasad Panikker
- Directed by: Antony Antony /Ratheesh Nettayam
- Creative director: Lalji Mangadan
- Country of origin: India
- Original language: Malayalam
- No. of episodes: 163

Production
- Producer: Prime Creation
- Cinematography: Ambili Sivaraman
- Editor: Pramod Nenmara
- Camera setup: Multi-camera
- Running time: 22 minutes
- Production company: Mother land

Original release
- Network: Mazhavil Manorama
- Release: 24 September 2018 – 10 May 2019

Related
- Pranayini; Marutheeram Thedi

Ilayaval Gayathri (transl. Younger sister Gayathri) is an Indian Malayalam television series launched on Mazhavil Manorama channel on 24 September 2018. It is an adaptation of the novel 'Penmakkal' by Sudhakar Mangalodayam. Arya Parvathy and Varada were the main female leads of the show.

== Plot ==
Gayathri, a young girl, who works as a postwoman and struggles to support her family while overcoming various obstacles that she comes across in her life.

== Cast ==
Lead Cast

- Arya Parvathy as Gayathri
- Varada as Gauri
- Sajan Surya/ Santhosh Sasidharan as Manu
- Harikrishnan / Pradeesh Jacob as Nandan
- Surjith Purohith as Adv Balu
- Devasurya as Shwetha Menon
- Jishin Joseph as Rajesh
- Kottayam Rasheed as Cornel Srinivasan
- Saniya Babu as Kavya

Supporting Cast

- Vijayalakshmi as Madhavi
- Gayathri Lakshmi as Subhashini
- Manka Mahesh
- Manu Varma
- Sreedevi Anil
- Sindhu
- Ambika Mohan
- Kavitha Lakshmi
- Rajesh Marath Asalan
- Gomathi Mahadevan
- Aniyappan
