= Shravan Reddy =

Indian actor

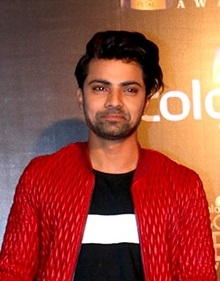
- Reddy at Colors Golden Petal Awards 2016
- Born: Hyderabad, Andhra Pradesh (now in Telangana), India
- Occupations: Actor, Model

Shravan Reddy is an Indian actor who predominantly works in Hindi and Telugu films and television. He made his acting debut in 2007 with the TV show Jersey No. 10.

Shravan made his film debut in a lead role with the Telugu erotic thriller Dirty Hari.

== Early life ==
Shravan Reddy was born and brought up in Hyderabad. He moved to Mumbai in late 2006 to pursue a career in acting.

== Career ==
Reddy made his debut as Nakul in SAB TV's Jersey No. 10 in 2007. He then had lead roles in Yahan Ke Hum Sikander (Zee TV) & Mere Ghar Aayi Ek Nanhi Pari (Colors). He played roles like Neil of Dosti... Yaariyan... Manmarziyan on Star Plus in 2015 and Aryan from Krishnadasi on Colors in 2016. His web series Thinkistan on Times MX Player fetched him a nomination for Best Male actor in FilmFare Indian Web Awards in 2019. He signed for Woolmark as a Brand Ambassador. He was part of the Celebrity Cricket Team, Chennai Swaggers on Box Cricket League season 2.

Reddy made his debut in a lead role in the Telugu feature film, Dirty Hari, directed by M. S. Raju.

== Filmography ==
=== Television ===
Year	Title	Role	Language	Network
2007	Jersey No. 10	Nakul	Hindi	Sony SAB
2013	Yeh Hai Aashiqui	Arjun	Hindi	Bindass
2014	Pyaar Tune Kya Kiya	Rohan	Hindi	Zing
2014	MTV Splitsvilla 7	Contestant	Hindi	MTV
2015	MTV Big F	Maan	Hindi	MTV
2015	Dosti... Yaariyan... Manmarziyan	Neil Malhotra	Hindi	StarPlus
2016	Krishnadasi	Aryan Pradyumna Vidyadhar Rao/Aryan Yashwant Chima	Hindi	Colors TV
2019	Thinkistan	Hema	Hindi	MX Player

=== Films ===
Year	Film	Role	Language	Notes
2020	Dirty Hari	Hari	Telugu	Debut as Lead; Nominated—SIIMA Award for Best Male Debut – Telugu
2023	Mangalavaaram	Vaasu	Telugu	
2026	Agadha	Simha/ Saleem	Telugu	
