= Valiyangadi (film) =

- Directed by: Salim Baba
- Produced by: Unni T. Prakash
- Starring: Manikkuttan; Varada; Kalabhavan Mani
- Cinematography: Vipin Mohan
- Edited by: K Sreenivas
- Music by: Sayan Anwar
- Release date: 5 March 2010
- Country: India
- Language: Malayalam

Valiyangadi is a 2010 Indian Malayalam-language film directed by Salim Baba. The movie features Manikkuttan, Varada and Kalabhavan Navas in the lead roles.

== Plot ==
Valiyangadi movie is all about Ananthu who is a graduate born in a big ancestral family, who opted to become a head load worker.

An idealist who wanted to prove the worth of every jobs, Ananthu easily became the leader of the entire trade union workers of Valiyangadi market in a very short while. Without any differentiation in politician, religion or language, every independent worker of the market adorned him as their unquestionable leader and hero, for whom they were ready to do anything.

But for shrewd, cunning businessmen and corrupt politicians, this tie up was more a menace and they plotted ways to somehow corner Ananthu and throw him out of the market. Some smaller issues created troubles for Ananthu, which he managed to clear off with his sincere ways.

But when he had a love affair with Gowry who is a girl born in the nearby slums and reared by the market folks, everyone started to doubt his intentions. As the relation was presented with a lot of false stories, many starts to dislike him. Ananthu was not prepared to fail in his life, even for his love Angelna. And he now decides to take on the business mafia and their evil ways.

What Anandu does to resolve the problem forms the rest of the story...

== Cast ==
- Manikkuttan as Ananthu
- Varada as Gowri
- Kalabhavan Navas as Parikutty
- Narayanan Kutty as Lazer
- Saju Kodiyan as Abutty
- Shweta Menon as Lakshmi
- T. G. Ravi as Divakaran
- Urmila Unni as Sethulakshmi
- Zeenath as Parikutty's mother
- Abu Salim as Police officer Prathap
- Shivaji Guruvayoor as Anandhu's father
- Santhosh as SI Abdul Jabbar
- Sudheesh as Umman Kora
- Boban Alummoodan as Minister
- Kottayam Nazeer as Anthappan
- Chembil Ashokan as Kottarathil Pappachan
- Subair as Bhattadiri sir
- Salu Kuttanad as Sulaiman
- Savithri Sreedharan as Namboothiri's wife

== Home video ==
The movie was released on DVD, VCD by Blueberry Communications, just a month after its theatrical release
