= Vinay Forrt =

Indian actor

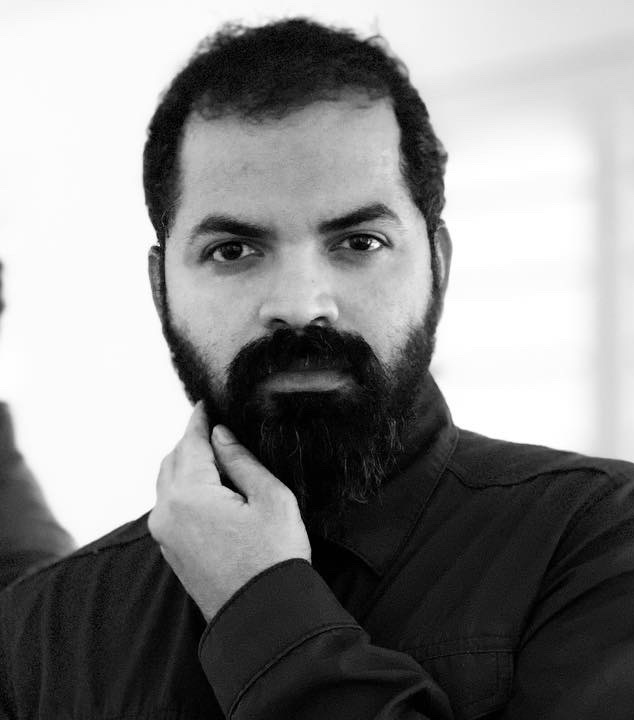
- Born: Vinay Kumar; 13 January 1983 (age 43); Fort Kochi, Kerala, India
- Occupations: Actor; TV presenter
- Years active: 2009–present
- Spouse: Soumya Ravi (m. 2014)
- Parents: M. V. Mani; Sujatha

Vinay Kumar (born 13 January 1983), professionally credited as Vinay Forrt is an Indian film and stage actor. He is from Fort Kochi, Kerala and has a postgraduate in acting from Film and Television Institute of India in Pune. He made his cinematic debut in the Malayalam film Ritu (2009).

== Early life and education ==
Vinay Forrt was born as Vinay Kumar in Fort Kochi, Kerala, to M. V. Mani and Sujatha. He has a sister, Suma, and a brother, Syam. He was educated at St John De Britto Anglo-Indian High School, Fort Kochi and Aquinas College, Edacochin. The name 'Forrt', in his stage name stands for Fort Kochi, which is his birthplace.

Before entering the movie industry, he worked at a restaurant, a coffee shop, medical shop and a call center. During his first year while studying for his degree, he joined Lokadharmi Theater and became active in their plays. Later he dropped out to join the Film and Television Institute of India in Pune, India, and became a postgraduate in acting. Vinay received the National Scholarship from the Government of India for the Best Senior Theatre Actor (2004 - 2006). He is a contemporary dancer as well.

== Acting career ==
While studying at the Film and Television Institute, Vinay Forrt was chosen by Shyamaprasad to play a role in his film Ritu (2009), where he debuted as a gay person, which earned him recognition.

He costarred in The Blueberry Hunt (2011), an English film by Anup Kurian with Naseeruddin Shah in the lead. He played a notable role in Navagatharkku Swagatham (2012). The film was a failure at box office. Vinay went on to play minor roles in several movies. He was noted for his role as Nanmayil Suran in Shutter (2012). The film was a critical and commercial success and was screened at various International film festivals. Vinay played a supporting role in the 2014 thriller 7th Day.

Vinay posted Vimal Sir in Alphonse Putharen's Premam. This role with a comic shade earned him wide recognition and some of his dialogues from the movie eventually developed a cult following. He played a lead role in the 2015 comedy thriller Urumbukal Urangarilla which received positive and mixed reviews. Vinay went on to be in movies including Kohinoor (2015) Kammatti Paadam, Kismath (2016) and God Say (2017). He played a lead role in Hello Namasthe (2016), which was a failure at box office. He had a major supporting role in Georgettans Pooram and Role Models, both released in 2017.

Vinay had the lead role in Thamasha (2019). He portrayed Srinivasan, a Malayalam professor unable to find a suitable woman to marry. Some critics reviewed it as one of his best performances. Vinay played a lead role in the satire Paapam Cheyyathavar Kalleriyatte (2020). The movie generally received positive reviews from critics. His comic role as Kripesh/Akash Menon in Mohan Kumar Fans (2021) was well received. Vinay's performance as David Chistudas, a friend-turned-foe of the protagonist in Mahesh Narayanan's Malik (2021) received wide appreciation from critics. Some consider this one of his best performances.

== Personal life ==
He married his longtime girlfriend Soumya Ravi, a research student, on 6 December 2014 at Guruvayoor. The couple have a son.

== Filmography ==
=== Films ===
Key
†	Denotes films that have not yet been released

Year	Title	Role	Notes
2009	Ritu	Jamal	
2010	Apoorvaragam	Narayanan	
2010	Anwar	Abu	
2010	Kadaksham	Abhay	
2010	The Blueberry Hunt		
2011	Veettilekulla Vazhi	Terrorist Leader in Ajmeer	
2011	Kanakompathu	Jose	
2011	Veeraputhran		
2011	Karmayogi	Kooman	
2011	Navagatharkku Swagatham	Aravindan	
2012	Prabhuvinte Makkal	Siddharthan	
2012	Theevram	Ramachandran	
2012	Da Thadiya	Shathanu	
2012	Shutter	Nanmayil Suran	
2014	7th Day	Shan Shahar	
2014	How Old Are You	Jayachandran	
2014	Manglish	Ambu	
2014	Masala Republic	Dixon	
2014	Seconds	Feroze	
2015	Njan Ninnodu Koodeyundu		
2015	Premam	Vimal 'Java' Sir	
2015	Karma Cartel	Sidth	
2015	Rasputin	Susheelan	
2015	Urumbukal Urangarilla	Manoj	
2015	Kohinoor	Freddy	
2016	Hello Namasthe	RJ Madhav	
2016	Kammatti Paadam	Venu	
2016	Kismath	Ajay C Menon	
2017	God Say	Harichandran	
2017	Avarude Raavukal	Vijay	
2017	Georgettans Pooram	Vava	
2017	Role Models	Subahaan	
2017	Kadam Kadha	Giri Pai	
2017	History of Joy	Krishna	
2017	Clint	Artist Mohan	
2017	Oru Visheshapetta Biriyani Kissa	Superior Angel	
2018	Ladoo	Vinu	
2018	Janaki		
2018	Nonsense	Santhosh	
2018	Kammara Sambhavam	Chandrabanu	
2019	Thamaasha	Sreenivasan	
2019	Unda	S. I. Balan	
2019	Vaarthakal Ithuvare	Mathews	
2019	Oronnonnara Pranayakadha		
2020	Paapam Cheyyathavar Kalleriyatte	Roy	
2021	Churuli	Shajeevan	
2021	Mohan Kumar Fans	Kripesh / Aghosh Menon	
2021	Malik	David Kristhudas	
2021	Kanakam Kaamini Kalaham	Jobby	
2023	Kolla	C.I. Farooq	
2023	Ramachandra Boss & Co	Sailesh P Damodar	
2023	Vaathil		
2023	Somante Krithavu	Soman	
2023	Family	Sony	
2024	Aattam	Vinay	
2024	Perumani		
2024	Big Ben		
2024	Chithini		
2025	Odum Kuthira Chaadum Kuthira	Siby	
2025	The Pet Detective	Rajath Menon	
2026	Mohiniyaattam	CI Parthan	
2026	Bethlehem Kudumba Unit	Alex	
2026	Pradhama Drishtiya Kuttakkar	SHO Prathap Mohan	
2026	Avaraachan & Sons		
2026	Hail Mary †	TBA	
TBA	Bermuda †	TBA	Unreleased

=== Television ===
Year	Title	Role	Channel	Notes
2011	Vivel Big Break	Host	Surya TV	Special Guest
2016	Comedy Super Nights 2	Host	Flowers	Replaced by Rachana
2020	Uppum Mulakum	Roy	Flowers	
2023	Uppum Mulakum season 2	Soman	Flowers	
2023	Gouri Shankaram	Vinay	Asianet	

== Awards ==
Year	Award
2014	Asianet Comedy Awards - Best Pair along with Soubin Shahir
2015	1st IIFA Utsavam for performance in a comic role - Malayalam
2016	18th Asianet film awards for Best Comedian
2016	5th South Indian International Movie Award for Best Comedian -Malayalam
